= X Factor (Polish TV series) season 4 =

X Factor
- Season 4
- Hosted by: Patricia Kazadi
- Judges: Kuba Wojewódzki; Tatiana Okupnik; Czesław Mozil; Ewa Farna
- Winner: Artem Furman
- Runner-up: Marta Bijan

Release
- Original network: TVN
- Original release: 1 March – 31 May 2014

Season chronology
- ← Previous; Season 3

X Factor is a Polish television music competition to find new singing talent. The fourth series began airing on TVN on 1 March 2014 and ended on 31 May 2014. Kuba Wojewódzki, Tatiana Okupnik and Czesław Mozil returned as judges. Ewa Farna joined the judging panel as the fourth judge. Patricia Kazadi presents the show.

This series saw a number of changes to the format, most notably the possibility of auditioning for bands with not all members singing and the increase in the number of categories from three to four, resulting from the division of the 16-24s category into separate male and female categories.

The winner of the series was Artem Furman, who received a recording contract with Sony Music, PLN 100,000, and a car. Marta Bijan, the runner-up of the competition, was given a special prize funded by MTV Poland, who will produce her debut music video. Anna Tacikowska took the third place.

== Judges and presenter ==
Series 4 judges

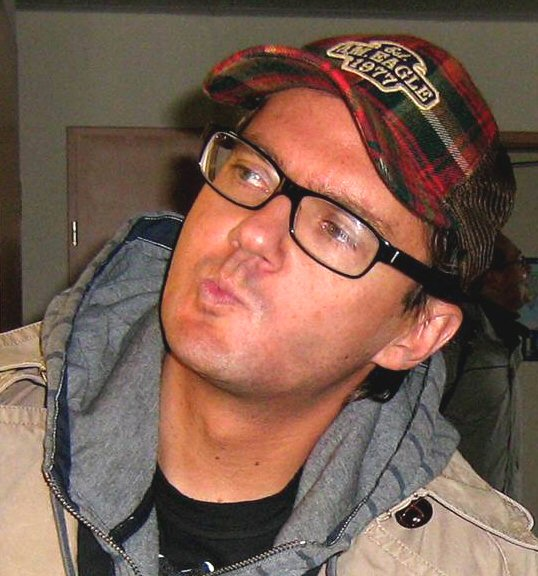
Kuba Wojewódzki

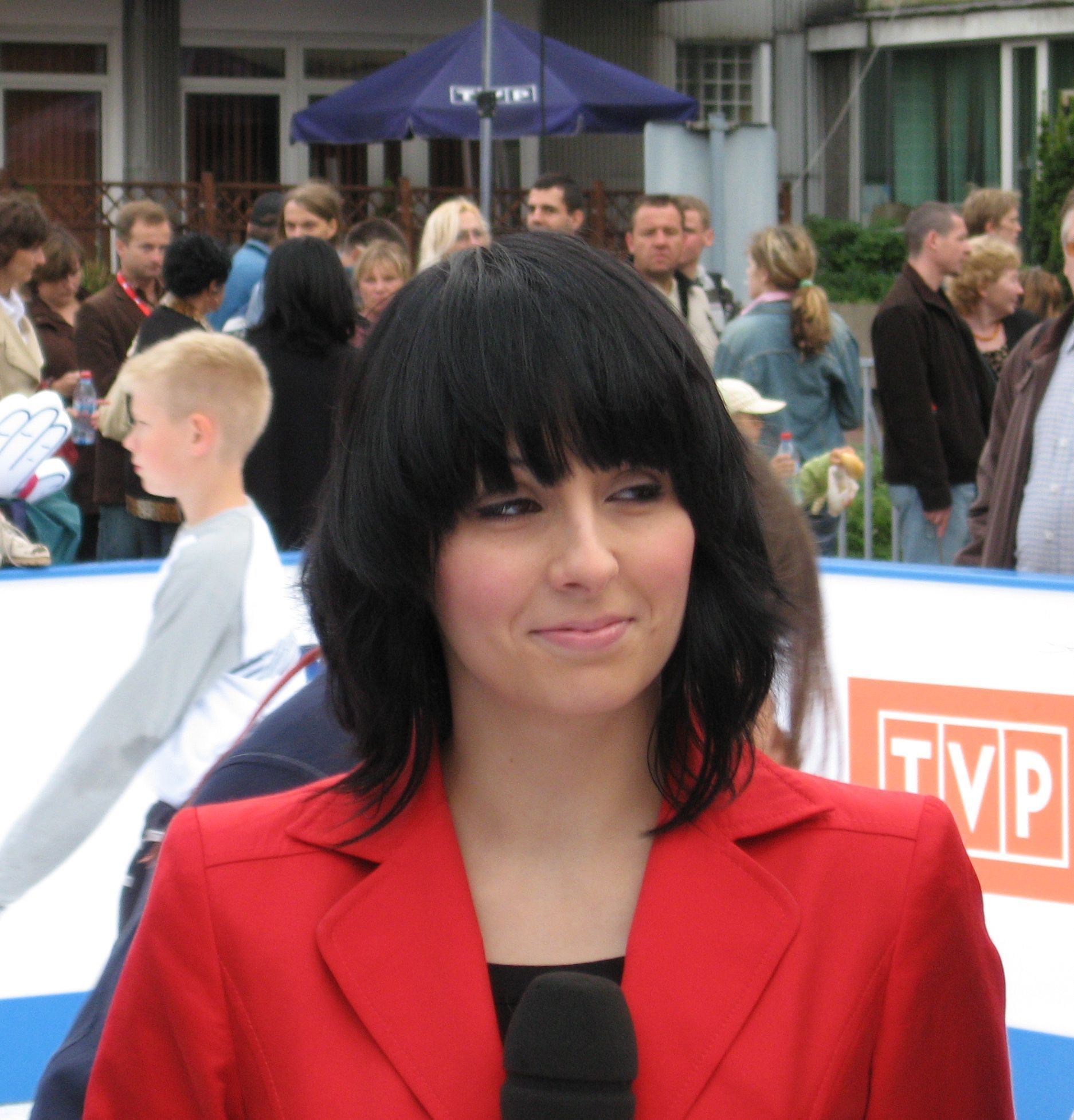
Tatiana Okupnik

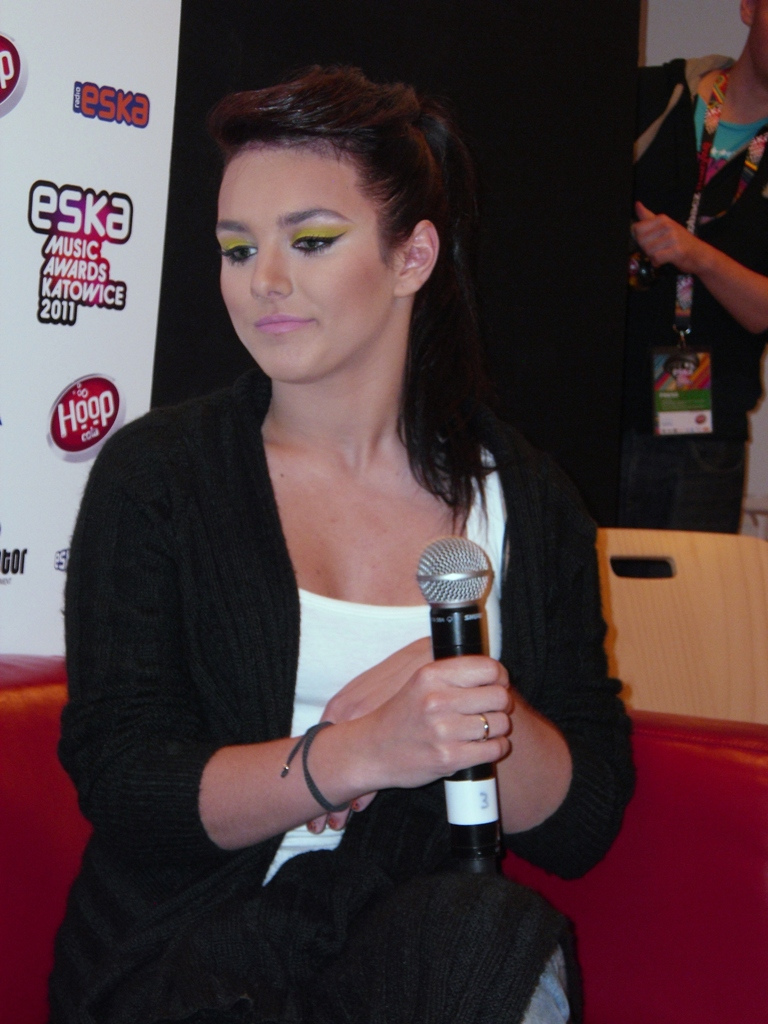
Ewa Farna

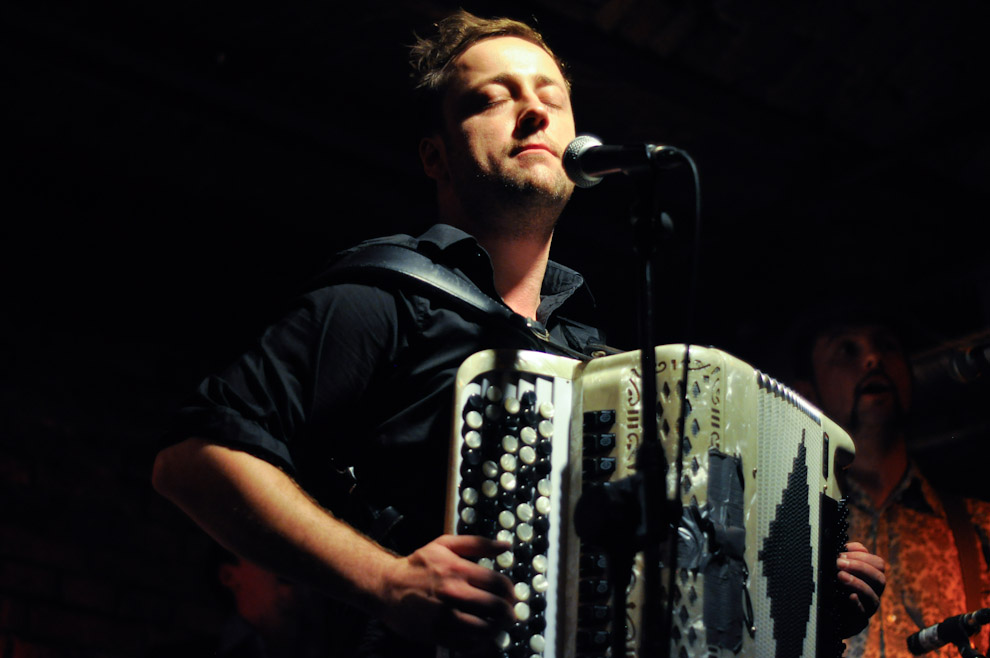
Czesław Mozil

After the end of the third series, media speculated about changes in the judging panel for the possible next series. Show's director Wojciech Iwański spoke about possible changes to the format, including extending the panel.

On 14 November 2013 it was announced that the judging panel would be extended as the three judges from the previous series, including Kuba Wojewódzki, Tatiana Okupnik and Czesław Mozil, would be joined by a fourth judge. Singers Ewa Farna, Sylwia Grzeszczak, Ewelina Lisowska, Monika Brodka, Katarzyna Nosowska and Margaret were rumoured to join the panel. Later that day, Ewa Farna was confirmed by TVN as the new judge.

However, on 3 December 2013 Ewa Farna posted a note on her Facebook page saying she could not confirm or deny anything yet as the final decision regarding her participation in the show had not been made yet. Later, TVN admitted that negotiations with Farna's management were still in progress. On 20 December 2013, Farna announced that she had decided to take part in the series and was about to sign her contract.

Patricia Kazadi returned to present the show for her second series.

== Selection process ==
=== Auditions ===
==== Open auditions ====
Open auditions in front of the show's producers began in Hotel Mercure Wrocław Centre in Wrocław on 7 December 2013 and continued in Zabrze (House of Music and Dance) on 8 December and Gdańsk (Hotel Mercure Gdańsk Old Town) on 13 December, before concluding in Warsaw (Torwar Hall) on 15 December.

==== Judges' auditions ====
Judges' auditions were held in House of Music and Dance in Zabrze in two parts: from 9 to 11 January 2014 and from 23 to 25 January 2014. Each day of auditions consisted of two sessions: afternoon and evening.

Auditionees needed a minimum of three "yes" votes (previously two) from the judges to proceed to the next round.

=== Bootcamp ===
Bootcamp stage of the competition took place in Transcolor Studio in Szeligi over two days, on 3 and 4 February 2014. In a change to the usual format, the judges were allocated their categories before bootcamp. Farna has the girls, Mozil has the boys, Okupnik has the over 25s and Wojewódzki has the groups and bands. On the first day of bootcamp, 118 acts who successfully got through the auditions, were put into groups of three or four within their category. They had to perform within that group, and the category judge, after being advised by other judges, would then decide who would continue. The contestants could choose among several songs, including "Dear Darlin'" by Olly Murs, "Love Me Again" by John Newman and "Sweet Dreams" by Beyoncé. At the end of the day, 40 contestants remained, who had to prepare their solo bootcamp performance overnight.

There was then a change in the format, that followed the idea of 'musical chairs', which was first introduced in the original British series in 2013. It involved the judges choosing the acts to advance to judges' houses immediately after their bootcamp performance, instead of waiting until everyone had performed. Each judge had five places to their judges house, and they granted a 'seat' to the performers they wanted to advance in their category. However, if a judge already chose five acts for their category, they could replace them if they preferred a later performer. Selection of songs included "Beneath Your Beautiful" by Labrinth and Emeli Sande, "She's the One" by World Party, "Who Wants To Live Forever" by Queen, "You Are So Beautiful" by Joe Cocker, "I Believe I Can Fly" by R. Kelly, "Billie Jean" by Michael Jackson, "Wake Me Up" by Avicii, "Stacja Warszawa" by Lady Pank, "I Wanna Dance with Somebody (Who Loves Me)" by Whitney Houston, "Firework" by Katy Perry, "Znak" by Ewa Farna and "Alone Again" by Alyssa Reid. Bootcamp was broadcast over two episodes, each of 90 minutes, on 5 and 12 April.

The 20 successful acts were:

- Boys: Artem Furman, Kacper Gołda, Jakub Jonkisz, Kuba Jurzyk, Aleksander Kamiński
- Girls: Magdalena Bal, Marta Bijan, Agata Dziarmagowska, Beata Spychalska, Daria Zawiałow
- Over 25s: Karolina Duszkiewicz, Małgorzata Markowska, Joao de Sousa, Anna Tacikowska, Małgorzata Uściłowska
- Groups and Bands: Cała Góra Barwinków, Hatbreakers, Pop It Up, Poprzytula, Trzynasta w Samo Południe

=== Judges' houses ===
Judges' houses took place in March and April. Each judge took the remaining members of their category to an abroad location, and had guests to assist them in their decisions. Farna's part was filmed on 3 and 4 March in Prague, Czech Republic, where she mentored the Girls, and was joined by Jakub Badach. Okupnik took the Over 25s to San Gimignano, Italy on 1 and 2 April and was assisted by Andrzej Piaseczny. Wojewódzki mentored the Groups and Bands in Alvernia Studios in Alwernia near Kraków with his guest judge Tomasz "Titus" Pukacki of Acid Drinkers. Mozil took the Boys to Volterra, Italy and was aided by Stanisław Sojka. Judges' houses was broadcast on 19 April.

Contestants' performances on the judges' houses
Act	Song	Result
Boys
Artem Furman	"Too Close"	Through
Aleksander Kamiński	"Just Give Me a Reason"	Eliminated
Kacper Gołda	"I Won't Give Up"	Eliminated
Kuba Jurzyk	"Hello"	Through
Jakub Jonkisz	"A Change Is Gonna Come"	Through
Groups and Bands
Pop It Up	"Sweet Harmony"	Eliminated
Cała Góra Barwinków	"Take On Me"	Through
Poprzytula	"Message in a Bottle"	Eliminated
Hatbreakers	"She Wants to Move"	Through
Trzynasta w Samo Południe	"T.N.T."	Through
Over 25s
Małgorzata Uściłowska	"When I Was Your Man"	Eliminated
Małgorzata Markowska	"I Wanna Be the Only One"	Eliminated
Joao de Sousa	"Porque Te Vas"	Through
Anna Tacikowska	"Listen"	Through
Karolina Duszkiewicz	"True Colors"	Through
Girls
Marta Bijan	"I Have Nothing"	Through
Magdalena Bal	"This World"	Through
Beata Spychalska	"What a Wonderful World"	Eliminated
Agata Dziarmagowska	"Can't Remember to Forget You"	Eliminated
Daria Zawiałow	"Purple Rain"	Through

Summary of judges' houses
Judge	Category	Location	Assistant	Contestants eliminated
Farna	Girls	Prague, Czech Republic	Jakub Badach	Agata Dziarmagowska, Beata Spychalska
Mozil	Boys	Volterra, Italy	Stanisław Sojka	Kacper Gołda, Aleksander Kamiński
Okupnik	Over 25s	San Gimignano, Italy	Andrzej Piaseczny	Małgorzata Markowska, Małgorzata Uściłowska
Wojewódzki	Groups and Bands	Alvernia Studios, Alwernia, Poland	Tomasz "Titus" Pukacki	Pop It Up, Poprzytula

== Contestants ==
The top 12 contestants were announced during the episode broadcast on 19 April 2014.

Key:

– Winner
– Runner up
– Third Place

Category (mentor)	Acts		
Boys (Mozil)	Artem Furman	Jakub Jonkisz	Kuba Jurzyk
Girls (Farna)	Magdalena Bal	Marta Bijan	Daria Zawiałow
Over 25s (Okupnik)	Karolina Duszkiewicz	Joao de Sousa	Anna Tacikowska
Groups and Bands (Wojewódzki)	Cała Góra Barwinków	Hatbreakers	Trzynasta w Samo Południe

== Live Shows ==
The live shows began on 26 April 2014.

=== Results summary ===
Colour key

–	Contestant was in the bottom two/three and had to sing again in the final showdown
–	Contestant was in the bottom three but received the fewest votes and was immediately eliminated
–	Contestant received the most public votes

Weekly results per contestant
Contestant	Week 1	Week 2	Week 3	Week 4	Week 5	Week 6
Artem Furman	10th	3rd	2nd	2nd	1st	Winner (week 6)
Marta Bijan	1st	2nd	6th	3rd	3rd	Runner-up (week 6)
Anna Tacikowska	2nd	1st	1st	1st	2nd	Third Place (week 6)
Jakub Jonkisz	4th	4th	3rd	4th	4th	Eliminated (week 5)
Trzynasta w Samo Południe	3rd	5th	5th	5th	Eliminated (week 4)	
Cała Góra Barwinków	5th	6th	4th	6th	Eliminated (week 4)	
Hatbreakers	6th	9th	7th	Eliminated (week 3)		
Magdalena Bal	8th	7th	8th	Eliminated (week 3)		
Daria Zawiałow	7th	8th	Eliminated (week 2)			
Kuba Jurzyk	9th	10th	Eliminated (week 2)			
Joao de Sousa	11th	Eliminated (week 1)				
Karolina Duszkiewicz	12th	Eliminated (week 1)				
Sing-off	Artem Furman, Joao de Sousa	Hatbreakers, Daria Zawiałow	Marta Bijan, Hatbreakers	Jakub Jonkisz, Trzynasta w Samo Południe	Marta Bijan, Jakub Jonkisz	No sing-off or judges' votes: results based on public votes alone
Judges voted to	Save					No sing-off or judges' votes: results based on public votes alone
Mozil's vote	Artem Furman	Hatbreakers	Marta Bijan	Jakub Jonkisz	Jakub Jonkisz	No sing-off or judges' votes: results based on public votes alone
Okupnik's vote	Joao de Sousa	Hatbreakers	Hatbreakers	Trzynasta w Samo Południe	Marta Bijan	No sing-off or judges' votes: results based on public votes alone
Farna's vote	Artem Furman	Daria Zawiałow	Marta Bijan	Jakub Jonkisz	Marta Bijan	No sing-off or judges' votes: results based on public votes alone
Wojewódzki's vote	Artem Furman	Hatbreakers	Hatbreakers	Trzynasta w Samo Południe	Marta Bijan	No sing-off or judges' votes: results based on public votes alone
Eliminated	Karolina Duszkiewicz; 2.7% to save	Kuba Jurzyk; 2.2% to save	Magdalena Bal; 5.6% to save	Cała Góra Barwinków; 10.1% to save	Jakub Jonkisz; 1 of 4 votes Minority	Anna Tacikowska
Eliminated	Joao de Sousa; 1 of 4 votes Minority	Daria Zawiałow; 1 of 4 votes Minority	Hatbreakers; 2 of 4 votes Deadlock	Trzynasta w Samo Południe; 2 of 4 votes Deadlock	Jakub Jonkisz; 1 of 4 votes Minority	Marta Bijan
Reference(s)						

=== Live show details ===
==== Week 1 (26 April) ====
- Theme: Songs chosen by the contestants
- Musical guests: Grzegorz Hyży ("Na Chwilę")

Contestants' performances on the first live show
Act	Order	Song	Result
Cała Góra Barwinków	1	"Locked Out of Heaven"	Safe
Magdalena Bal	2	"Piece of My Heart"	Safe
Artem Furman	3	"The Lazy Song"	Bottom three
Anna Tacikowska	4	"I Will Love Again"	Safe
Hatbreakers	5	"Ain't No Sunshine"	Safe
Kuba Jurzyk	6	"Use Somebody"	Safe
Marta Bijan	7	"Skyscraper"	Safe
Joao de Sousa	8	"Garota de Ipanema"	Bottom three
Trzynasta w Samo Południe	9	"Sweet Home Alabama"	Safe
Karolina Duszkiewicz	10	"Since U Been Gone"	Eliminated
Jakub Jonkisz	11	"It's a Man's Man's Man's World"	Safe
Daria Zawiałow	12	"I Don't Want to Miss a Thing"	Safe
Final showdown details
Artem Furman	1	"Wicked Game"	Safe
Joao de Sousa	2	"Friday I'm in Love"	Eliminated

Judges' votes to save

- Mozil: Artem Furman - backed his own act
- Okupnik: Joao de Sousa - backed her own act
- Farna: Artem Furman - gave no reason, but praised both final showdown performances
- Wojewódzki: Artem Furman - gave no reason

==== Week 2 (3 May) ====
- Theme: Songs from the 1980s
- Musical guests: Ewa Farna ("Ulubiona Rzecz"/"Znak")

Contestants' performances on the second live show
Act	Order	Song	Result
Trzynasta w Samo Południe	1	"Gimme! Gimme! Gimme! (A Man After Midnight)"	Safe
Daria Zawiałow	2	"Stop!"	Bottom three
Kuba Jurzyk	3	"Against All Odds (Take a Look at Me Now)"	Eliminated
Anna Tacikowska	4	"Sweet Dreams (Are Made of This)"	Safe
Magdalena Bal	5	"You Shook Me All Night Long"	Safe
Hatbreakers	6	"Let's Dance"	Bottom three
Artem Furman	7	"Wind Of Change"	Safe
Cała Góra Barwinków	8	"Material Girl"	Safe
Jakub Jonkisz	9	"I Want to Know What Love Is"	Safe
Marta Bijan	10	"Total Eclipse of the Heart"	Safe
Final showdown details
Daria Zawiałow	1	"Sex on Fire"	Eliminated
Hatbreakers	2	"Brown Sugar"	Safe

Judges' votes to save

- Wojewódzki: Hatbreakers - backed his own act
- Okupnik: Hatbreakers - praised Zawiałow, but decided to back Hatbreakers
- Farna: Daria Zawiałow - backed her own act, but stated that Hatbreakers were her favourites from the beginning
- Mozil: Hatbreakers - thought that Hatbreakers showed new quality of cover songs

==== Week 3 (10 May) ====
- Theme: Songs from years 2013-2014

Contestants' performances on the third live show
Act	Order	Song	Result
Cała Góra Barwinków	1	"Can't Remember to Forget You"	Safe
Hatbreakers	2	"Happy"	Bottom three
Jakub Jonkisz	3	"All of Me"	Safe
Magdalena Bal	4	"Addicted to You"	Eliminated
Trzynasta w Samo Południe	5	"Ordinary Love"	Safe
Marta Bijan	6	"Unconditionally"	Bottom three
Artem Furman	7	"I See Fire"	Safe
Anna Tacikowska	8	"Rather Be"	Safe
Final showdown details
Marta Bijan	1	"People Help the People"	Safe
Hatbreakers	2	"Roxanne"	Eliminated

Judges' votes to save

- Wojewódzki: Hatbreakers - backed his own act
- Farna: Marta Bijan - backed her own act
- Mozil: Marta Bijan - due to the fact that Hatbreakers were in bottom three for the second time in a row
- Okupnik: Hatbreakers - gave no reason

With the acts in the sing-off receiving two votes each, the result was deadlocked and reverted to the earlier public vote. Hatbreakers were eliminated as the act with fewer public votes.

==== Week 4 (17 May) ====
- Themes: Songs chosen by mentors; Polish songs
- Musical guest: Tatiana Okupnik ("Oczy Na Zapałki")

Contestants' performances on the fourth live show
Act	Order	First song	Order	Second song	Result
Trzynasta w Samo Południe	1	"Sexy and I Know It"	7	"Niepokonani"	Bottom three
Cała Góra Barwinków	2	"Starlight"	9	"Byłaś Serca Biciem"	Eliminated
Jakub Jonkisz	3	"When a Man Loves a Woman"	10	"Jednego Serca"	Bottom three
Marta Bijan	4	"Set Fire to the Rain"	8	"Miałeś Być"	Safe
Artem Furman	5	"Jolene"	12	"Ostatni"	Safe
Anna Tacikowska	6	"Halo"	11	"Testosteron"	Safe
Final showdown details
Jakub Jonkisz	1	"Heaven"			Safe
Trzynasta w Samo Południe	2	"Deuce"			Eliminated

Judges' votes to save

- Mozil: Jakub Jonkisz - backed his own act
- Okupnik: Trzynasta w Samo Południe - based on the final showdown performance
- Wojewódzki: Trzynasta w Samo Południe - backed his own act
- Farna: Jakub Jonkisz - thought it would be easier for Trzynasta w Samo Południe to launch their career, whilst Jonkisz needs to stay in the competition

With the acts in the sing-off receiving two votes each, the result was deadlocked and reverted to the earlier public vote. Trzynasta w Samo Południe were eliminated as the act with fewer public votes.

==== Week 5: Semi-final (24 May) ====
- Themes: Songs by The Beatles; The Greatest Hits

Contestants' performances on the fifth live show
Act	Order	First song	Theme	Order	Second song	Theme	Result
Marta Bijan	1	"All My Loving"	Songs by The Beatles	5	"The Show Must Go On"	The Greatest Hits	Bottom two
Anna Tacikowska	2	"Proud Mary"	The Greatest Hits	8	"With a Little Help from My Friends"	Songs by The Beatles	Safe
Artem Furman	3	"Eleanor Rigby"	Songs by The Beatles	7	"Tears in Heaven"	The Greatest Hits	Safe
Jakub Jonkisz	4	"Love's Divine"	The Greatest Hits	6	"Something"	Songs by The Beatles	Bottom two
Final showdown details
Jakub Jonkisz	1	"Angels"					Eliminated
Marta Bijan	2	"Say Something"					Safe

Judges' votes to save

- Mozil: Jakub Jonkisz - backed his own act
- Farna: Marta Bijan - backed her own act
- Wojewódzki: Marta Bijan - stated that she was his favourite from the beginning
- Okupnik: Marta Bijan - thought she made the biggest progress throughout the competition

==== Week 6: Final (31 May) ====
- Themes: Audition songs; favourite performance; celebrity duets
- Group performance: "Get Lucky" (performed by all finalists)

Contestants' performances on the final live show
Act	Order	Audition song	Order	Favourite song	Order	Duet	Result
Artem Furman	1	"Strielaj"	4	"The Lazy Song"	9	"Wildest Moments" (with Jessie Ware)	Winner
Anna Tacikowska	2	"Only Girl (in the World)"	5	"Rather Be"	7	"Deeper" (with Ella Eyre)	Third place
Marta Bijan	3	"Wrecking Ball"	6	"Skyscraper"	8	"Liar Liar" (with Cris Cab)	Runner-up

== Ratings ==
Summary of episode ratings
Episode	Date	Duration (minutes)^1	Official rating (millions)	Weekly rank	Share (%)	Weekly rank (16-49)	Share 16-49 (%)	Source(s)
Auditions 1	1 March	90	2.48	>20	15.8		20.6	
Auditions 2	8 March	90	2.56	>20	16.1		20.0	
Auditions 3	15 March	90	2.81	>20	17.9	7	23.7	
Auditions 4	22 March	90	2.52	>20	16.6	20	21.2	
Auditions 5	29 March	90	3.08	15	19.6	8	22.4	
Bootcamp 1	5 April	90	2.52	>20	16.5	12	20.9	
Bootcamp 2	12 April	90	2.63	>20	17.2	9	23.1	
Judges' houses	19 April	110	1.81	>20			17.3	
Live Show 1	26 April	135	1.80	>20				
Live Show 2	3 May	135	2.27	>20		12	18.2	
Live Show 3	10 May	110	1.64	>20		>20		
Live Show 4	17 May	135	1.83	>20		>20		
Live Semi-final	24 May	110	1.69	>20		>20		
Live Final	31 May	135	1.85	>20		>20		
Series average	2014	-	2.25		14.7		18.1	

^{1} Includes advert breaks
