= X Factor (Polish TV series) season 2 =

X Factor
- Season 2
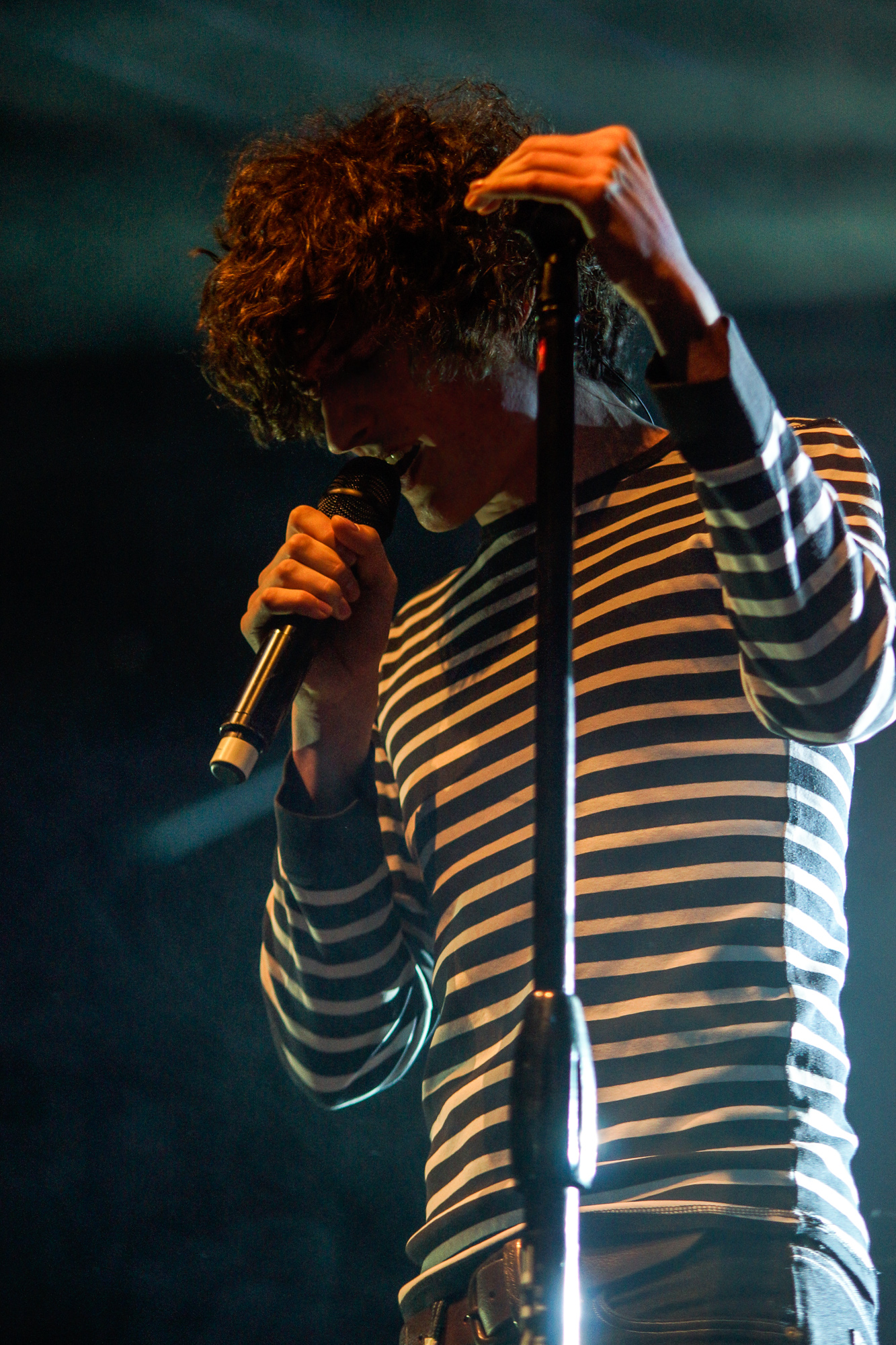
- Hosted by: Jarosław Kuźniar
- Judges: Czesław Mozil; Kuba Wojewódzki; Tatiana Okupnik
- Winner: Dawid Podsiadło
- Runner-up: Marcin Spenner

Release
- Original network: TVN
- Original release: 3 March – 2 June 2012

Season chronology
- ← Previous; Season 1 Next → Season 3

The second series of Polish television music competition X Factor started on TVN on 3 March and will end in June 2012. The pre-auditions took place in December 2011 and filmed auditions began on 10 January 2012 in Zabrze. Two of the judges, Czesław Mozil and Kuba Wojewódzki returned, though Maja Sablewska had left the show after the first series. She was replaced by a new judge, Tatiana Okupnik. Jarosław Kuźniar returned to present the show.

== Judges and presenter ==
Series 2 judges

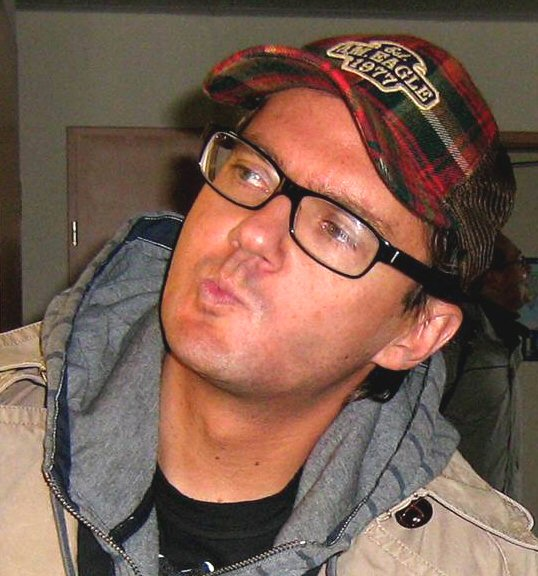
Kuba Wojewódzki

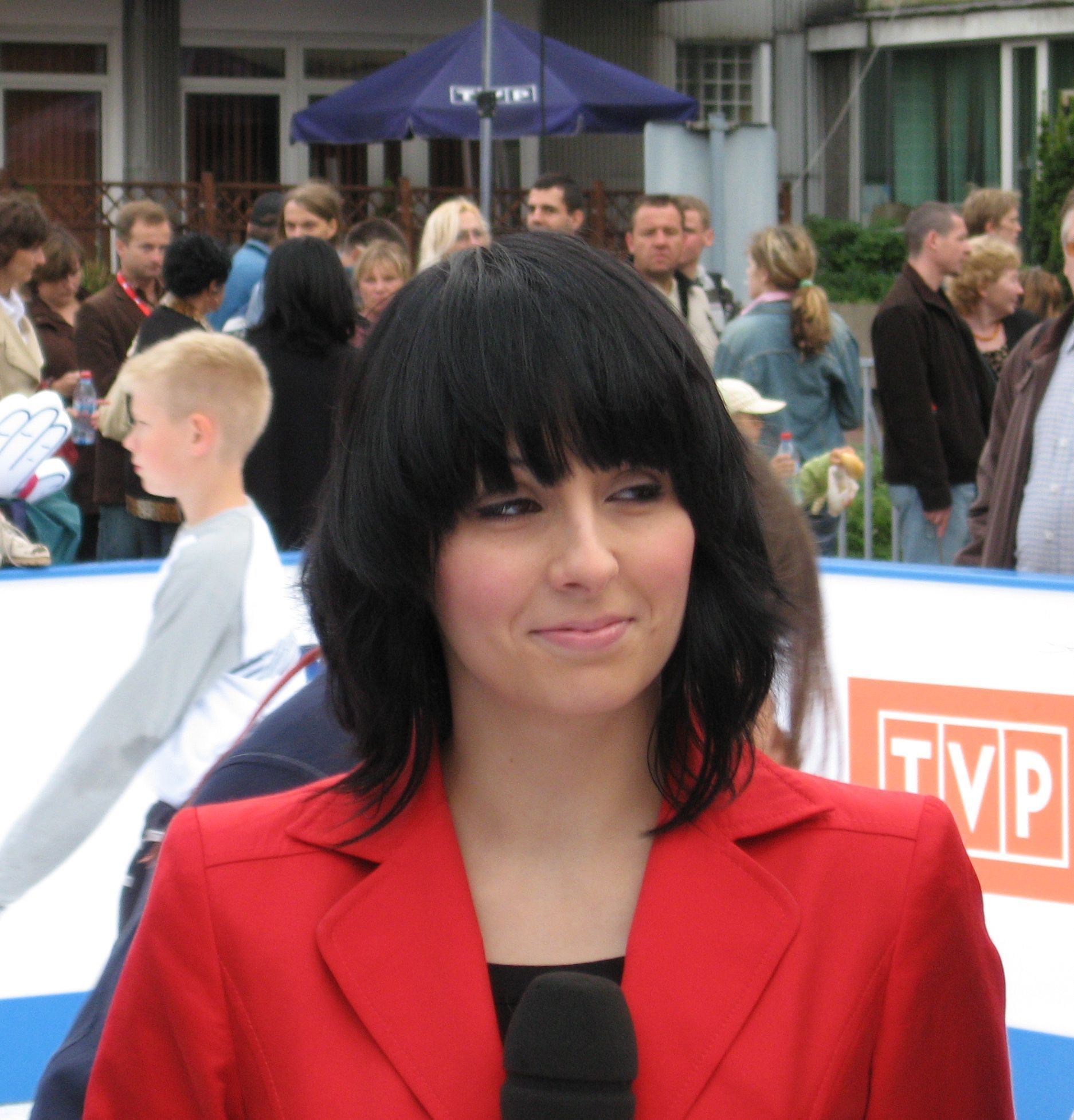
Tatiana Okupnik

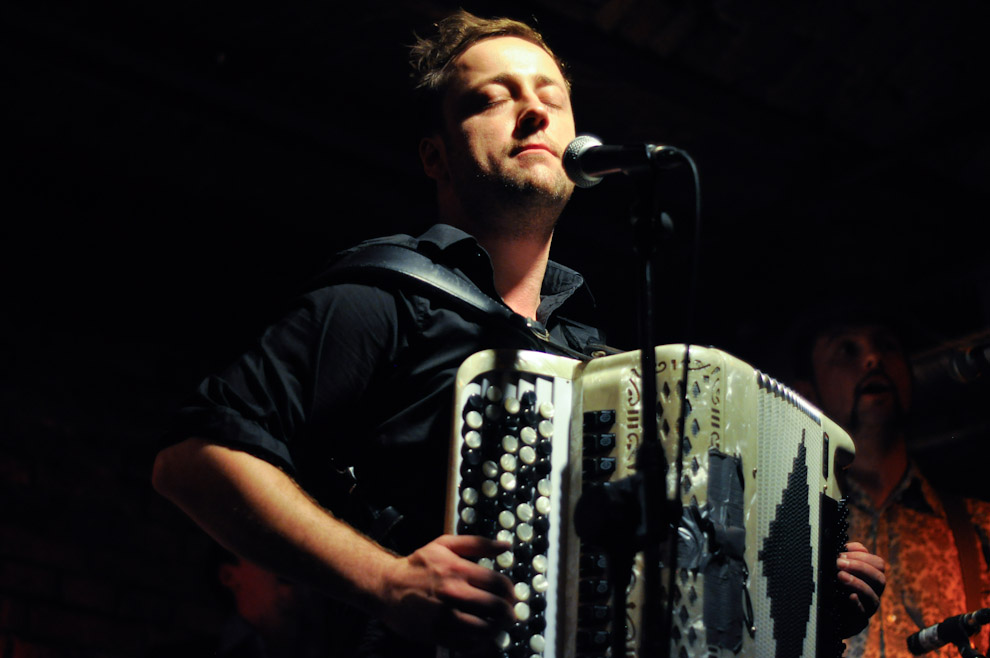
Czesław Mozil

The judging panel line-up for the second series of X Factor was revealed on 5 January 2012. Kuba Wojewódzki and Czesław Mozil returned for the show and were joined by new judge, Tatiana Okupnik, who replaced Maja Sablewska.

In December 2012, media reported that Maja Sablewska would not return and would be replaced by a female singer. Monika Brodka, Ewa Farna and Tatiana Okupnik were said to be in the running for the job.

In October 2011, Adam Darski, better known by his stage name Nergal, was rumoured to join X Factor judging panel. He was a judge on the first series of The Voice of Poland, but was expected not to return for the next year due to the controversy caused by his appearance on the show. Darski was accused of spreading satanism by his behaviour on stage. That was why many catholic organisations wanted the public Polish Television (TVP) which broadcasts the show, to fire him. His contract with TVP expired after the final of the series in December 2011.

In November 2011, Fakt reported that Natalia Kukulska might join the judging panel, replacing Maja Sablewska. Kukulska was already rumoured as judge on the first series of X Factor in late 2010, but the network decided to hire Sablewska. According to some reports, Kukulska was interested in the judging role on the show.

On 8 November 2011, Fakt reported that Edyta Górniak was one of the favourites to become the permanent judge or only appear at the judges' houses stage of the show. Few days later, in an interview with Plejada she confirmed that she had been offered a judging role on X Factor and its rival show, Bitwa na głosy. She revealed that she was considering both offers, but not as seriously as media reports. She also added that she wanted to focus on her upcoming concerts and might not have enough time to serve as a judge. Later, Górniak was announced as the new coach on Bitwa na głosy.

On 21 November 2011, it was officially confirmed by TVN that Jarosław Kuźniar would return to present the second series of X Factor.

== Selection process ==
=== Applications and auditions ===
The pre-auditions took place in December 2011 in four Polish cities: Gdańsk, Wrocław, Zabrze and Warsaw. These featured auditionees performing in front of the producers only, without judges' participation yet. The filming started with the judges' auditions, which began on 10 January 2012 in Zabrze. These also continued on 11 and 12 January. The second part of Zabrze auditions took place on 25, 26 and 27 January.

City	Venue	Pre-audition	Audition
Gdańsk	Hotel Mercure 'Heweliusz'	2 December 2011	—N/a
Wrocław	Hotel Mercure 'Panorama'	4 December 2011	—N/a
Zabrze	House of Music and Dance	11 December 2011	10–12 January 2012; 25–27 January 2012
Warsaw	Torwar Hall	17 December 2011	—N/a

=== Bootcamp ===
Bootcamp took place on 31 January and 1 February in Warsaw. The episode was broadcast on 7 April 2012.

The fifteen chosen acts were:

- 16-24s - Anna Antonik, Ewelina Lisowska, Bożena Mazur, Dawid Podsiadło, Klaudia Szafrańska
- Over 25s - Paweł 'Biba' Binkiewicz, Thomas Grotto, Joanna Kwaśnik, Izabela Mytnik, Marcin Spenner
- Groups - Che Donne, De Facto, Okay, Soul City, The Chance

=== Judges' houses ===
Tatiana Okupnik was joined by Verona Chard, who helped her to choose her final three acts. Kuba Wojewódzki invited Leszek Możdzer. Czesław Mozil was aided by Ewa Farna.

The six eliminated acts were:

- 16-24s: Klaudia Szafrańska, Bożena Mazur
- Over-25s: Izabela Mytnik, Thomas Grotto
- Groups: Che Donne, Okay

Contestants' performances on the judges' houses
Act	Song	Result
Over-25s
Marcin Spenner	"Iris"	Through
Paweł Binkiewicz	"Maybe Tomorrow"	Through
Joanna Kwaśnik	"If I Ain't Got You"	Through
Izabela Mytnik	"True Colors"	Eliminated
Thomas Grotto	"Let Me Entertain You"	Eliminated
Groups
Che Donne	"Sway"	Eliminated
The Chance	"(You Make Me Feel Like) A Natural Woman"	Through
Okay	"I Will Survive"/"Survivor"	Eliminated
Soul City	"Somebody That I Used To Know"	Through
De Facto	"Sweet Dreams (Are Made Of This)"	Through
16-24s
Dawid Podsiadło	"Shape of My Heart"	Through
Anna Antonik	"Warwick Avenue"	Through
Ewelina Lisowska	"Beautiful"	Through
Klaudia Szafrańska	"Everybody Hurts"	Eliminated
Bożena Mazur	"Ain't Nobody"	Eliminated

== Contestants ==
The top 9 contestants were confirmed as follows:

Key:

– Winner
– Runner up
– Third Place

Category (mentor)	Acts		
16-24s (Okupnik)	Anna Antonik	Ewelina Lisowska	Dawid Podsiadło
Over 25s (Wojewódzki)	Paweł Binkiewicz	Joanna Kwaśnik	Marcin Spenner
Groups (Mozil)	The Chance	De Facto	Soul City

== Live shows ==
=== Results summary ===
Contestants' colour key:

– Kuba Wojewódzki's contestants (over 25s)
– Tatiana Okupnik's contestants (16–24s)
– Czesław Mozil's contestants (groups)

	Week 1	Week 2	Week 3	Week 4	Week 5	Week 6	Week 7
Dawid Podsiadło	Safe	Safe	Safe	Safe	Safe	Safe	Winner
Marcin Spenner	Safe	Safe	Safe	Safe	Safe	Safe	Runner-up
The Chance	Bottom two	Safe	Bottom two	Safe	Bottom two	Bottom two	Third place
Ewelina Lisowska	Safe	Safe	Safe	Safe	Safe	Bottom two	Eliminated (week 6)
Soul City	Safe	Safe	Safe	Bottom two	Bottom two	Eliminated (week 5)	
Joanna Kwaśnik	Safe	Bottom two	Safe	Bottom two	Eliminated (week 4)		
Anna Antonik	Safe	Safe	Bottom two	Eliminated (week 3)			
Paweł Binkiewicz	Safe	Bottom two	Eliminated (week 2)				
De Facto	Bottom two	Eliminated (week 1)					
Bottom two	De Facto, The Chance	Paweł Binkiewicz, Joanna Kwaśnik	Anna Antonik, The Chance	Joanna Kwaśnik, Soul City	Soul City, The Chance	Ewelina Lisowska, The Chance	No final showdown or judges' vote: results are based on public votes alone
Mozil's's vote to save	The Chance	Joanna Kwaśnik	The Chance	Soul City	The Chance	The Chance	No final showdown or judges' vote: results are based on public votes alone
Okupnik's vote to save	The Chance	Joanna Kwaśnik	Anna Antonik	Soul City	The Chance	Ewelina Lisowska	No final showdown or judges' vote: results are based on public votes alone
Wojewódzki's vote to save	De Facto	—N/a^{1}	The Chance	Joanna Kwaśnik	Soul City	The Chance	No final showdown or judges' vote: results are based on public votes alone
Eliminated	De Facto; 1 of 3 votes Minority	Paweł Binkiewicz; 0 of 2 votes Minority	Anna Antonik; 1 of 3 votes Minority	Joanna Kwaśnik; 1 of 3 votes Minority	Soul City; 1 of 3 votes Minority	Ewelina Lisowska; 1 of 3 votes Minority	The Chance; 11% to win
Eliminated	De Facto; 1 of 3 votes Minority	Paweł Binkiewicz; 0 of 2 votes Minority	Anna Antonik; 1 of 3 votes Minority	Joanna Kwaśnik; 1 of 3 votes Minority	Soul City; 1 of 3 votes Minority	Ewelina Lisowska; 1 of 3 votes Minority	Marcin Spenner; 42% to win

- ^1Wojewódzki was not required to vote as there was already a majority.

=== Live show details ===
==== Week 1 (21 April) ====
- Theme: Songs chosen by the contestants

Contestants' performances on the first live show
Act	Order	Song	Result
The Chance	1	"The Best"	Bottom two
Joanna Kwaśnik	2	"Someone Like You"	Safe
Ewelina Lisowska	3	"Just Like A Pill"	Safe
De Facto	4	"Closer"	Bottom two
Marcin Spenner	5	"Heaven"	Safe
Soul City	6	"Free Your Mind"	Safe
Anna Antonik	7	"Apologize"	Safe
Paweł Binkiewicz	8	"Fly Away"	Safe
Dawid Podsiadło	9	"With Or Without You"	Safe
Final showdown details
De Facto	1	"I Swear"	Eliminated
The Chance	2	"I'm So Excited"	Safe

Judges' votes to save

- Wojewódzki: De Facto
- Okupnik: The Chance
- Mozil: The Chance

==== Week 2 (28 April) ====
- Theme: Disco

Contestants' performances on the second live show
Act	Order	Song	Result
Paweł Binkiewicz	1	"Kung Fu Fighting"	Bottom two
Anna Antonik	2	"Hot Stuff"	Safe
Soul City	3	"Celebration"	Safe
Joanna Kwaśnik	4	"September"	Bottom two
Dawid Podsiadło	5	"Can't Take My Eyes Off You"	Safe
The Chance	6	"Blame It on the Boogie"	Safe
Ewelina Lisowska	7	"I Will Survive"	Safe
Marcin Spenner	8	"Bad Girls"	Safe
Final showdown details
Paweł Binkiewicz	1	"Cosmic Girl"	Eliminated
Joanna Kwaśnik	2	"Mercy"	Safe

Judges' votes to save

- Mozil: Joanna Kwaśnik
- Okupnik: Joanna Kwaśnik
- Wojewódzki: not required to vote as there was already a majority

==== Week 3 (5 May) ====
- Theme: Musical Giants

Contestants' performances on the third live show
Act	Order	Song	Musical Giant	Result
Ewelina Lisowska	1	"If I Could Turn Back Time"	Cher	Safe
The Chance	2	"Sorry"	Madonna	Bottom two
Marcin Spenner	3	"Always"	Bon Jovi	Safe
Anna Antonik	4	"Imagine"	John Lennon	Bottom two
Soul City	5	"They Don't Care About Us"	Michael Jackson	Safe
Joanna Kwaśnik	6	"Think"	Aretha Franklin	Safe
Dawid Podsiadło	7	"Your Song"	Elton John	Safe
Final showdown details
Anna Antonik	1	"Killing Me Softly with His Song"		Eliminated
The Chance	2	"Mercedes Benz"		Safe

Judges' votes to save

- Mozil: The Chance - backed his own act
- Okupnik: Anna Antonik - backed her own act
- Wojewódzki: The Chance - stated he couldn't imagine the show without this group, but said a lot of good words about Antonik

==== Week 4 (12 May) ====
- Theme: Songs from films
- Group performance: "It's Raining Men"

Contestants' performances on the fourth live show
Act	Order	Song	Film / TV Series	Result
Soul City	1	"I'll Be There for You"	Friends	Bottom two
Joanna Kwaśnik	2	"Another Way to Die"	Quantum of Solace	Bottom two
Dawid Podsiadło	3	"Girl, You'll Be a Woman Soon"	Pulp Fiction	Safe
The Chance	4	"The Shoop Shoop Song (It's in His Kiss)"	Mermaids	Safe
Marcin Spenner	5	"She's Like the Wind"	Dirty Dancing	Safe
Ewelina Lisowska	6	"Bring Me to Life"	Daredevil	Safe
Final showdown details
Joanna Kwaśnik	1	"Super Duper Love (Are You Diggin' on Me)"		Eliminated
Soul City	2	"Ain't No Mountain High Enough"		Safe

Judges' votes to save

- Mozil: Soul City
- Wojewódzki: Joanna Kwaśnik
- Okupnik: Soul City

==== Week 5 (19 May) ====
- Themes: Big band, Polish songs

Contestants' performances on the fifth live show
Act	Order	First song	Order	Second song	Result
Ewelina Lisowska	1	"Candyman"	6	"Winna"	Safe
The Chance	2	"I Say a Little Prayer"	10	"Sic!"	Bottom two
Dawid Podsiadło	3	"Cry Me a River"	9	"Cichosza"	Safe
Marcin Spenner	4	"Everybody Needs Somebody to Love"	7	"Do kołyski"	Safe
Soul City	5	"What a Wonderful World"	8	"Mamona"	Bottom two
Final showdown details
The Chance	1	"Stand by Me"			Safe
Soul City	2	"This World"			Eliminated

Judges' votes to save

- Wojewódzki: Soul City
- Okupnik: The Chance
- Mozil: The Chance

==== Week 6: Semi-final (26 May) ====
- Themes: Songs chosen by mentors; songs by Adele

Contestants' performances on the sixth live show
Act	Order	First song	Order	Second song	Result
Dawid Podsiadło	1	"Every Teardrop Is a Waterfall"	6	"One and Only"	Safe
The Chance	2	"Girls Just Want to Have Fun"	5	"Set Fire to the Rain"	Bottom two
Ewelina Lisowska	3	"If I Were a Boy"	7	"Rumour Has It"	Bottom two
Marcin Spenner	4	"I Want to Know What Love Is"	8	"Rolling in the Deep"	Safe
Final showdown details
Ewelina Lisowska	1	"Sweet Dreams"			Eliminated
The Chance	2	"Eye of the Tiger"			Safe

Judges' votes to save

- Mozil: The Chance
- Okupnik: Ewelina Lisowska
- Wojewódzki: The Chance

==== Week 7: Final (2 June) ====
- Themes: No theme (songs the mentor and contestants believe will get them through the final); celebrity duets
- Celebrity duet performers:
  - Katie Melua with Dawid Podsiadło
  - Amy Macdonald with The Chance
  - Brainstorm with Marcin Spenner
- Celebrity performers: Tatiana Okupnik (vocal), Czesław Mozil (accordion), Kuba Wojewódzki (percussion) ("Fever")

Contestants' performances on the final live show
Act	Order	First song	Order	Second song (duet)	Result
The Chance	1	"The Shoop Shoop Song (It's in His Kiss)"	4	"Slow It Down" (with Amy Macdonald)	Third place
Marcin Spenner	2	"Do kołyski"	5	"Thunder Without Rain" (with Brainstorm)	Runner-up
Dawid Podsiadło	3	"With Or Without You"	6	"Better Than a Dream" (with Katie Melua)	Winner

== Ratings ==
Episode	Date	Official rating (millions)	Weekly rank	Weekend rank	Share (%)	Share 16-49 (%)	Source(s)
Auditions 1	3 March	3.30		18	20.7	25.6	
Auditions 2	10 March	4.01	12	8	24.8	30.9	
Auditions 3	17 March	3.73	15		24.1	29.5	
Auditions 4	24 March	3.85	12	6	24.9	31.2	
Auditions 5	31 March	3.74					
Bootcamp	7 April	3.48					
Judges' houses	14 April	3.05					
Live show 1	21 April	2.92					
Live show 2	28 April	2.36					
Live show 3	5 May	2.56					
Live show 4	12 May	2.76					
Live show 5	19 May	2.67					
Live show 6	26 May	2.38					
Live show 7	2 June	3.12					
Average	2012	3.14					
