= X Factor (Polish TV series) season 3 =

X Factor
- Season 3
- Hosted by: Patricia Kazadi
- Judges: Czesław Mozil; Tatiana Okupnik; Kuba Wojewódzki
- Winner: Klaudia Gawor
- Runner-up: Grzegorz Hyży

Release
- Original network: TVN
- Original release: 23 February – 26 May 2013

Season chronology
- ← Previous; Season 2 Next → Season 4

X Factor is a Polish television music competition to find new singing talent and part of a British franchise The X Factor. The third series began on 23 February 2013 and ended on 26 May 2013. All three judges known from the previous series including Czesław Mozil, Tatiana Okupnik and Kuba Wojewódzki returned. On 21 November 2012 it was announced that Jarosław Kuźniar would not be back to present the series for personal reasons and his commitments to TVN24. On 13 December 2012, Patricia Kazadi was confirmed as the new presenter. It was reported that Marcin Prokop, Szymon Majewski and Agnieszka Szulim had also been in running for the role.

The winner of the series was Klaudia Gawor, who received a recording contract with label Sony Music Poland, 100,000 PLN and a car funded by Sokołów, sponsor of the show. It was also revealed that MTV would produce her debut music video.

== Selection process ==
=== Auditions ===
The pre-auditions began on 1 December in Wrocław and ended on 15 December 2012 in Warsaw. These were followed by judges' auditions held in Zabrze on 9–11 January 2013 and 23–25 January 2013.

City	Venue	Pre-audition
Wrocław	Hotel Mercure 'Panorama'	1 December 2012
Zabrze	House of Music and Dance	2 December 2012
Gdańsk	Hotel Mercure 'Heweliusz'	8 December 2012
Warsaw	Torwar Hall	15 December 2012

=== Bootcamp ===
Bootcamp stage of the competition took place at the Polish Theatre in Warsaw on 5–6 February 2013. On the first day acts divided into groups gave performances in front of the judges. Each act sang a part of song, they had chosen. Selection of songs included: "Livin' on a Prayer" by Bon Jovi, "Next To Me" by Emeli Sande, "Imagine" by John Lennon, Kelly Clarkson's "Stronger (What Doesn't Kill You)", "Are You Gonna Go My Way" by Lenny Kravitz, "What Makes You Beautiful" by One Direction, "Wherever You Will Go" by The Calling, "Drive By" by Train and Whitney Houston's "I Have Nothing".

At the end of the day judges chose forty acts, who got through to the second day of Botcamp. Each of them had to choose one song out of two given and prepare their solo performance overnight. After seeing all performances, the judges made the decision and selected fifteen acts, five in each category, who got through to the Judges' houses stage of the competition.

At the end of Bootcamp each judge received the category they would be mentoring. Wojewódzki was given the 16-24s, Mozil got the Over 25s and Okupnik was asked to look after the Groups.

The fifteen chosen acts were:

- 16-24s - Klaudia Gawor, Maja Hyży, Diana John, Marta Ławska, Filip Mettler
- Over 25s - Olga Barej, Wojciech Ezzat, Grzegorz Hyży, Zofia Szulakowska, Piotr 'Elton' Waśkowski
- Groups - Aicha and Asteya, Daddy's Prides, Girls On Fire, Kasia and Ewa, The Voices

=== Judges' houses ===
The Judges' houses stage was filmed in various locations in the country throughout March 2013. Tatiana Okupnik was joined by musician and producer Radzimir Dębski, who helped her to choose her final three acts. Czesław Mozil was aided by musician known from YouTube CeZik, while Kuba Wojewódzki invited Katarzyna Nosowska.

The six eliminated acts were:

- 16-24s: Diana John, Marta Ławska
- Over-25s: Zofia Szulakowska, Piotr 'Elton' Waśkowski
- Groups: Daddy's Prides, Kasia and Ewa

Contestants' performances on the judges' houses
Act	Song	Result
Over-25s
Wojciech Ezzat	"Love's Divine"	Through
Zofia Szulakowska	"Ta Noc Do Innych Jest Niepodobna"	Eliminated
Grzegorz Hyży	"I Don't Want to Miss a Thing"	Through
Olga Barej	"Titanium"	Through
Piotr 'Elton' Waśkowski	"One"	Eliminated
Groups
The Voices	"Bohemian Rhapsody"	Through
Aicha and Asteya	"I Try"	Through
Girls On Fire	"This World"	Through
Daddy's Prides	"Ain't No Other Man"	Eliminated
Kasia and Ewa	"Back to Black"	Eliminated
16-24s
Diana John	"1+1"	Eliminated
Klaudia Gawor	"Halo"	Through
Filip Mettler	"I'd Rather Go Blind"	Through
Marta Ławska	"There You'll Be"	Eliminated
Maja Hyży	"A Woman's Worth"	Through

== Contestants ==
The contestants were announced during the episode broadcast on 6 April 2013.

Key:

– Winner
– Runner up
– Third Place

Category (mentor)	Acts		
16-24s (Wojewódzki)	Klaudia Gawor	Maja Hyży	Filip Mettler
Over 25s (Mozil)	Olga Barej	Wojciech Ezzat	Grzegorz Hyży
Groups (Okupnik)	Aicha and Asteya	Girls On Fire	The Voices

== Live shows ==
=== Results summary ===
Contestants' colour key:

– Czesław Mozil's contestants (over 25s)
– Kuba Wojewódzki's contestants (16–24s)
– Tatiana Okupnik's contestants (groups)

	Week 1	Week 2	Week 3	Week 4	Week 5	Week 6	Week 7
Klaudia Gawor	Safe	Safe	Safe	Safe	Safe	Safe	Winner
Grzegorz Hyży	Safe	Safe	Safe	Safe	Safe	Bottom two	Runner-up
Wojciech Ezzat	Safe	Safe	Safe	Safe	Safe	Safe	Third place
Maja Hyży	Safe	Safe	Safe	Safe	Bottom two	Bottom two	Eliminated (week 6)
Girls On Fire	Safe	Safe	Bottom two	Bottom two	Bottom two	Eliminated (week 5)	
Aicha and Asteya	Bottom two	Bottom two	Safe	Bottom two	Eliminated (week 4)		
Filip Mettler	Safe	Safe	Bottom two	Eliminated (week 3)			
Olga Barej	Safe	Bottom two	Eliminated (week 2)				
The Voices	Bottom two	Eliminated (week 1)					
Bottom two	Aicha and Asteya, The Voices	Aicha and Asteya, Olga Barej	Filip Mettler, Girls On Fire	Aicha and Asteya, Girls On Fire	Girls On Fire, Maja Hyży	Grzegorz Hyży, Maja Hyży	No final showdown or judges' vote: results are based on public votes alone
Mozil's's vote to save	The Voices	Olga Barej	Girls On Fire	Girls On Fire	Maja Hyży	Grzegorz Hyży	No final showdown or judges' vote: results are based on public votes alone
Okupnik's vote to save	Aicha and Asteya	Aicha and Asteya	Girls On Fire	Girls On Fire	Girls On Fire	Grzegorz Hyży	No final showdown or judges' vote: results are based on public votes alone
Wojewódzki's vote to save	Aicha and Asteya	Aicha and Asteya	Filip Mettler	Aicha and Asteya	Maja Hyży	Maja Hyży	No final showdown or judges' vote: results are based on public votes alone
Eliminated	The Voices; 1 of 3 votes Minority	Olga Barej; 1 of 3 votes Minority	Filip Mettler; 1 of 3 votes Minority	Aicha and Asteya; 1 of 3 votes Minority	Girls On Fire; 1 of 3 votes Minority	Maja Hyży; 1 of 3 votes Minority	Wojciech Ezzat
Eliminated	The Voices; 1 of 3 votes Minority	Olga Barej; 1 of 3 votes Minority	Filip Mettler; 1 of 3 votes Minority	Aicha and Asteya; 1 of 3 votes Minority	Girls On Fire; 1 of 3 votes Minority	Maja Hyży; 1 of 3 votes Minority	Grzegorz Hyży

=== Live show details ===
==== Week 1 (13 April) ====
- Theme: Number-one singles
- Musical guests: Dawid Podsiadło ("Nieznajomy") and M. Pokora featuring Patricia Kazadi ("Wanna Feel You Now")

Contestants' performances on the first live show
Act	Order	Song	Result
Aicha and Asteya	1	"Move in the Right Direction"	Bottom two
Olga Barej	2	"Stronger (What Doesn't Kill You)"	Safe
Filip Mettler	3	"When I Was Your Man"	Safe
Girls On Fire	4	"Scream & Shout"	Safe
Wojciech Ezzat	5	"Heaven"	Safe
Klaudia Gawor	6	"Just Give Me a Reason"	Safe
The Voices	7	"Mirrors"	Bottom two
Grzegorz Hyży	8	"Troublemaker"	Safe
Maja Hyży	9	"Summertime Sadness"	Safe
Final showdown details
Aicha and Asteya	1	"I Follow Rivers"	Safe
The Voices	2	"The Way You Make Me Feel"	Eliminated

Judges' votes to save

- Wojewódzki: Aicha and Asteya
- Mozil: The Voices
- Okupnik: Aicha and Asteya

==== Week 2 (20 April) ====
- Theme: Rock

Contestants' performances on the second live show
Act	Order	Song	Result
Grzegorz Hyży	1	"Seven Nation Army"	Safe
Filip Mettler	2	"Cry Me a River"	Safe
Aicha and Asteya	3	"Toxic"	Bottom two
Wojciech Ezzat	4	"With a Little Help from My Friends"	Safe
Maja Hyży	5	"It's My Life"	Safe
Girls On Fire	6	"The Final Countdown"	Safe
Olga Barej	7	"Hedonism (Just Because You Feel Good)"	Bottom two
Klaudia Gawor	8	"Listen to Your Heart"	Safe
Final showdown details
Olga Barej	1	"Rescue Me"	Eliminated
Aicha and Asteya	2	"One Day / Reckoning Song"	Safe

Judges' votes to save

- Okupnik: Aicha and Asteya - thought Barej's final showdown performance was better than her first performance, but backed her own act, Aicha and Asteya
- Mozil: Olga Barej - said Barej sang better in the final showdown performance, effectively backing his own act, Olga Barej
- Wojewódzki: Aicha and Asteya - gave no reason

==== Week 3 (27 April) ====
- Theme: Disco

Contestants' performances on the third live show
Act	Order	Song	Result
Filip Mettler	1	"Without You"	Bottom two
Maja Hyży	2	"Only Girl (In the World)"	Safe
Girls On Fire	3	"I Should Be So Lucky" / "Can't Get You Out of My Head"	Bottom two
Wojciech Ezzat	4	"Treasure"	Safe
Klaudia Gawor	5	"Like a Prayer"	Safe
Aicha and Asteya	6	"Poker Face"	Safe
Grzegorz Hyży	7	"Wake Me Up Before You Go-Go"	Safe
Final showdown details
Filip Mettler	1	"Locked Out of Heaven"	Eliminated
Girls On Fire	2	"Girl on Fire"	Safe

Judges' votes to save

- Wojewódzki: Filip Mettler - thought both acts sang better in the final showdown performance than before, but backed his own act, Filip Mettler
- Okupnik: Girls On Fire - said she was disappointed Girls On Fire were in bottom two, effectively backing her own act, Girls On Fire
- Mozil: Girls On Fire - praised Mettler's confidence in the final showdown performance, but stated it was not enough and backed Girls On Fire

==== Week 4 (4 May) ====
- Theme: Songs by Queen or Michael Jackson
- Group performances: "Somebody to Love" and "Heal the world"

Contestants' performances on the fourth live show
Act	Order	Song	Result
Aicha and Asteya	1	"Thriller"	Bottom two
Maja Hyży	2	"You Are Not Alone"	Safe
Grzegorz Hyży	3	"Too Much Love Will Kill You"	Safe
Girls On Fire	4	"We Will Rock You"	Bottom two
Klaudia Gawor	5	"I'll Be There"	Safe
Wojciech Ezzat	6	"Who Wants to Live Forever"	Safe
Final showdown details
Aicha and Asteya	1	"Stay"	Eliminated
Girls On Fire	2	"Don't Let Go (Love)"	Safe

Judges' votes to save

- Mozil: Girls On Fire - thought Aicha and Asteya don't work as a duo and backed Girls On Fire
- Wojewódzki: Aicha and Asteya - praised Girls on Fire for their final showdown performance, though decided to back Aicha and Asteya
- Okupnik: Girls On Fire - gave no reason

==== Week 5 (11 May) ====
- Theme: Pop songs; Polish songs

Contestants' performances on the fifth live show
Act	Order	First song	Order	Second song	Result
Wojciech Ezzat	1	"Angels"	6	"C'est la vie"	Safe
Maja Hyży	2	"Everything at Once"	7	"Testosteron"	Bottom two
Girls On Fire	3	"Crazy in Love" / "Crazy"	8	"Supermenka"	Bottom two
Grzegorz Hyży	4	"This Love"	9	"Za szkłem"	Safe
Klaudia Gawor	5	"Because You Loved Me"	10	"Ja wysiadam"	Safe
Final showdown details
Maja Hyży	1	"Schoolin' Life"			Safe
Girls On Fire	2	"Proud Mary"			Eliminated

Judges' votes to save

- Wojewódzki: Maja Hyży - backed his own act
- Okupnik: Girls On Fire - backed her own act
- Mozil: Maja Hyży - thought Hyży had better connection with audience

==== Week 6: Semi-final (18 May) ====
- Theme: Soul; Big Band

Contestants' performances on the sixth live show
Act	Order	First song	Order	Second song	Result
Klaudia Gawor	1	"Lady Marmalade"	5	"All the Man That I Need"	Safe
Grzegorz Hyży	2	"I Need a Dollar"	6	"If You Don't Know Me by Now"	Bottom two
Maja Hyży	3	"Smooth Operator"	7	"If I Ain't Got You"	Bottom two
Wojciech Ezzat	4	"Georgia on My Mind"	8	"Don't Stop the Music"	Safe
Final showdown details
Maja Hyży	1	"The Best"			Eliminated
Grzegorz Hyży	2	"She Will Be Loved"			Safe

Judges' votes to save

- Wojewódzki: Maja Hyży - stated his vote was not against Grzegorz Hyży, but had to back his own act, Maja Hyży
- Mozil: Grzegorz Hyży - backed his own act
- Okupnik: Grzegorz Hyży - thought there were some weaknesses in Maja Hyży's performances and decided to back Grzegorz Hyży

==== Week 7: Final (26 May) ====
- Theme: Favourite performance; winner's single; celebrity duets
- Group performance: "One Way or Another (Teenage Kicks)" (all finalists)

Contestants' performances on the seventh live show
Act	Order	First song	Order	Second song	Order	Third song (duet)	Result
Grzegorz Hyży	1	"Seven Nation Army"	4	"Pragnienie"	7	"Wild Love" (with Rea Garvey)	Runner-up
Wojciech Ezzat	2	"With a Little Help from My Friends"	5	"Ilu"	8	"Twist In My Sobriety" (with Tanita Tikaram)	Third Place
Klaudia Gawor	3	"Because You Loved Me"	6	"Lekkość życia bez słów"	9	"List" (with Edyta Górniak)	Winner

== Winner ==
On 26 May 2013 in the final episode of the series Klaudia Gawor was crowned the winner.

Klaudia Gawor (born 1995) is a singer from Kraków. She has been singing for five years, after her primary school music teacher encouraged her to take vocal lessons. She graduated from a two-year vocal-acting school. In 2011 Gawor won „Talenty Małopolski 2011” competition and „Festiwal Małych Form Teatralnych”. Now she is taking classical vocal lessons. Since 2011 she is a member of Kraków Gospel Choir. Her favourite music genres are jazz, soul and 60's blues.

== Ratings ==
Summary of episode ratings
Episode	Date	Official rating (millions)	Share (%)	Share 16-49 (%)
Auditions 1	23 February	3 795 983	24,40%	28,60%
Auditions 2	2 March	3 739 828	23,10%	27,40%
Auditions 3	9 March	3 533 616	21,60%	25,50%
Auditions 4	16 March	3 516 578	22,00%	26,10%
Auditions 5	23 March	3 835 956	24,10%	28,70%
Bootcamp	30 March	3 075 405	21,70%	25,40%
Judges' houses	6 April	2 660 557	16,80%	20,80%
Live show 1	13 April	2 997 794	19,80%	25,70%
Live show 2	20 April	2 478 378	16,90%	21,60%
Live show 3	27 April	2 368 109	16,50%	21,20%
Live show 4	4 May	2 391 181	17,40%	20,60%
Live show 5	11 May	2 426 957	18,30%	22,40%
Live Semi-final	18 May	2 252 811	17,50%	22,70%
Live Final	26 May	3 126 014	19,50%	22,50%
Series average	2013	2 966 146	19,89%	24,22%
