= X Factor (Polish TV series) season 1 =

X Factor
- Season 1
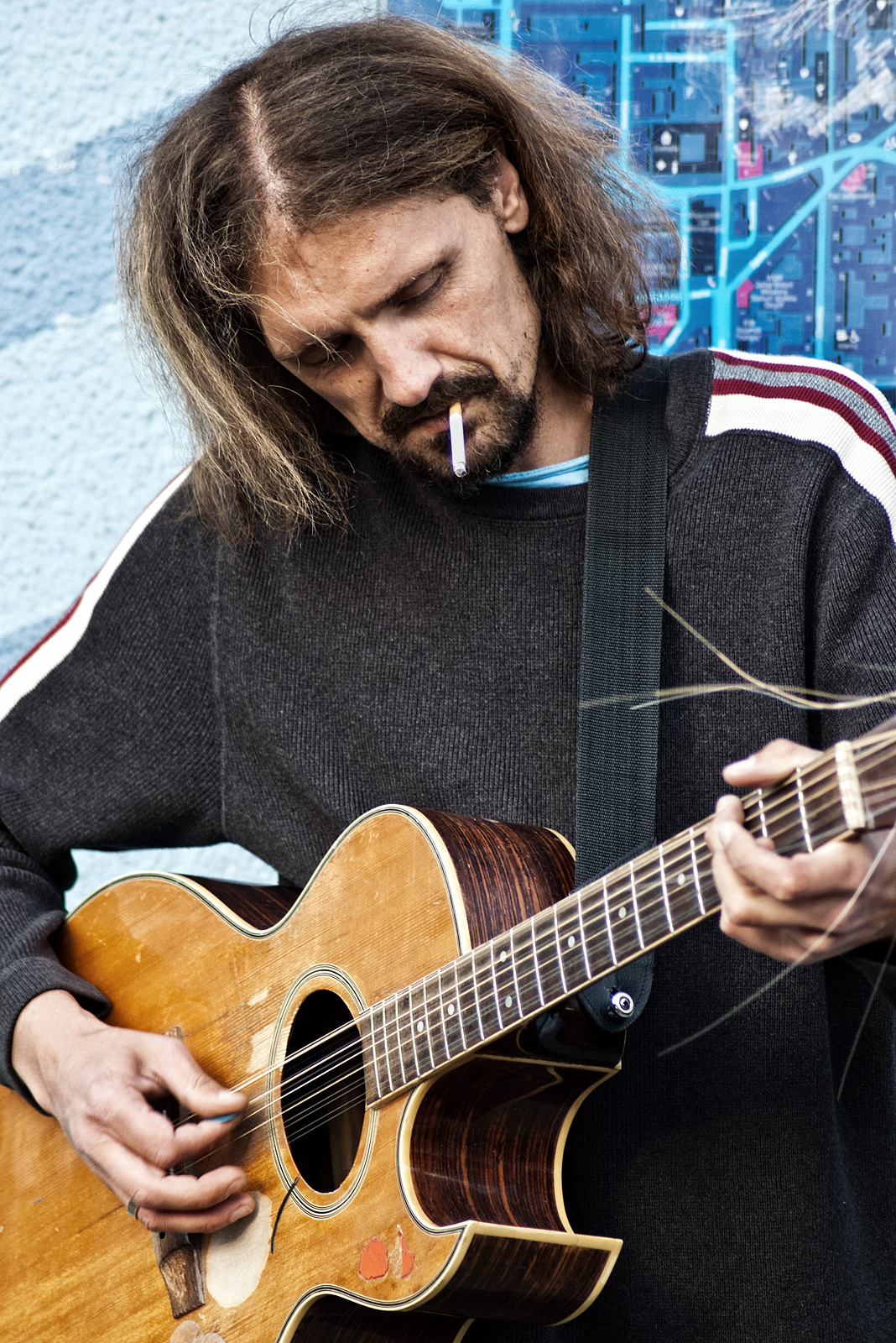
- Hosted by: Jarosław Kuźniar
- Judges: Czesław Mozil; Maja Sablewska; Kuba Wojewódzki
- Winner: Gienek Loska
- Runner-up: Michał Szpak

Release
- Original network: TVN
- Original release: 6 March – 5 June 2011

Season chronology
- Next → Season 2

The first season of X Factor premiered on 6 March 2011 at 20:00 on TVN. The auditions for this season were held in January and February. Jarosław Kuźniar hosts the show and the judges are Czesław Mozil, Maja Sablewska and Kuba Wojewódzki. The series was won by Gienek Loska who was mentored by Czesław Mozil. The second place was taken by Michał Szpak and the third finalist was Ada Szulc.

Filming of the first season began with the first audition with judges and audience on 24 January in Zabrze. The live shows began on 24 April and the finale was broadcast on 5 June.

== Selection process ==
=== Auditions ===
The first stage of the show were pre-auditions, held in four major cities across Poland. The candidates sang two chosen songs a cappella in the pre-auditions, where they were judged by the show's producers only. The judges didn't take part in pre-auditions and the performances were not filmed for the show at this stage. The candidates who had got through participated in the second stage of the auditions which took place in two cities. At this stage they performed in front of the judges and a live audience. Highlights from these auditions were broadcast on television during the initial programmes of the season.

City	Venue	Pre-audition	Audition
Zabrze	House of Music and Dance	8 January 2011	24–25 January 2011, 8–9 February 2011
Wrocław	Hotel Mercure Panorama	9 January 2011	
Warsaw	Torwar Hall (Pre-audition); Dramatic Theatre (Audition)	14 January 2011	4–5 February 2011
Gdańsk	Baltic Philharmonic	16 January 2011	

Viewers could take part in the auditions as members of the audience, by invitation, in Zabrze and Warsaw by sending an SMS.

=== Bootcamp (10 April) ===
The second stage took place on 13 and 14 February in Warsaw. During the first day a hundred acts performed one chosen song from a list of twelve prepared by the judges. They performed in small groups depending on the song choice. Each contestant got a part to sing. The most popular songs were: You Can Leave Your Hat On by Joe Cocker, Apologize by OneRepublic, Cicho by Ewa Farna, Mercy by Duffy, Śniadanie Do Łóżka by Andrzej Piaseczny, A Night Like This by Caro Emerald and Rihanna’s Only Girl (In the World). Then the judges chose forty acts who got through to the second day of bootcamp. Other sixty contestants had to quit the competition and go home. However three solo girls who applied as soloists were offered to stay in the competition and perform as a group. The new girlband called By Mistake was formed. Remaining forty acts spent the night in a hotel in Warsaw. There they had time to prepare their bootcamp challenge. From the list of ten songs they had to choose one and perform in front of the judges next day. The most sung were: Konstelacje by Pin, Bad Romance by Lady Gaga, Sweet About Me by Gabriella Cilmi, Czas nie będzie czekał by Blue Cafe, and Light My Fire by The Doors. Then the judges made a decision again. They chose only fifteen acts, who got through to the judges' houses stage. After announcing the names, the fifteen lucky acts were divided into three categories, five acts in each. They waited in three rooms for their mentors to come. Eventually Czesław Mozil got the Over-25s, Maja Sablewska was given the Groups and Kuba Wojewódzki was asked to look after the 16-24s.

=== Judges' houses (17 April) ===
Maja Sablewska was joined by Sebastian Karpiel-Bułecka, who helped her to choose her final three acts. Kuba Wojewódzki invited Alicja Bachleda-Curuś and Czesław Mozil was aided by Monika Brodka.

The six eliminated acts were:

- 16-24s: Anna Kłys, Ada Styrcz
- Over-25s: Marta Podulka, Wojciech Strzelecki
- Groups: De Pe, By Mistake

Contestants' performances on the judges' houses
Act	Song	Result
Over-25s
William Malcolm	"We Didn't Start the Fire"	Through
Małgorzata Stankiewicz	"Ostatni"	Through
Wojciech Strzelecki	"Angie"	Eliminated
Gienek Loska	"Since I've Been Loving You"	Through
Marta Podulka	"The Time Is Now"	Eliminated
Groups
Avocado	"Wonderful Life"	Through
By Mistake	"Another Way to Die"	Eliminated
Dziewczyny	"It's My Party"	Through
De Pe	"Paparazzi	Eliminated
Sweet Rebels	"Angel"	Through
16-24s
Michał Szpak	"Szczęśliwej drogi już czas"	Through
Anna Kłys	"All by Myself"	Eliminated
Ada Szulc	"Time After Time"	Through
Ada Styrcz	"Roxanne"	Eliminated
Mats Meguenni	"Bed of Roses"	Through

== Categories and contestants ==
The top 9 contestants was revealed on 17 April 2011.

Key:

– Winner
– Runner-up
– Third Place

Category (mentor)	Acts		
16-24s (Wojewódzki)	Mats Meguenni	Ada Szulc	Michał Szpak
Over-25s (Mozil)	Gienek Loska	William Malcolm	Małgorzata Stankiewicz
Groups (Sablewska)	Avocado	Dziewczyny	Sweet Rebels

== Live shows ==
=== Results table ===
Contestants' colour key:

– Czesław Mozil's contestants (over 25s)
– Kuba Wojewódzki's contestants (16–24s)
– Maja Sablewska's contestants (groups)

	Week 1	Week 2	Week 3	Week 4	Week 5	Week 6	Week 7
Gienek Loska	Safe	Safe	Safe	Safe	Safe	Safe	Winner
Michał Szpak	Safe	Safe	Safe	Safe	Safe	Bottom two	Runner-up
Ada Szulc	Safe	Safe	Safe	Safe	Safe	Safe	Third place
Małgorzata Stankiewicz	Safe	Safe	Safe	Safe	Bottom two	Bottom two	Eliminated (Week 6)
Dziewczyny	Safe	Safe	Safe	Bottom two	Bottom two	Eliminated (Week 5)	
Mats Meguenni	Safe	Safe	Bottom two	Bottom two	Eliminated (Week 4)		
Sweet Rebels	Bottom two	Bottom two	Bottom two	Eliminated (Week 3)			
William Malcolm	Safe	Bottom two	Eliminated (Week 2)				
Avocado	Bottom two	Eliminated (Week 1)					
Bottom two	Sweet Rebels, Avocado	Sweet Rebels, William Malcolm	Sweet Rebels, Mats Meguenni	Mats Meguenni, Dziewczyny	Dziewczyny, Małgorzata Stankiewicz	Małgorzata Stankiewicz, Michał Szpak	No final showdown or judges' vote: results are based on public votes alone
Wojewódzki's vote to save	Sweet Rebels	Sweet Rebels	Mats Meguenni	Mats Meguenni	Małgorzata Stankiewicz	Michał Szpak	No final showdown or judges' vote: results are based on public votes alone
Sablewska's vote to save	N/A^{1}	Sweet Rebels	Sweet Rebels	Dziewczyny	Dziewczyny	N/A^{2}	No final showdown or judges' vote: results are based on public votes alone
Mozil's vote to save	Sweet Rebels	William Malcolm	Mats Meguenni	Dziewczyny	Małgorzata Stankiewicz	Michał Szpak	No final showdown or judges' vote: results are based on public votes alone
Eliminated	Avocado; 0 of 2 votes	William Malcolm; 1 of 3 votes Minority	Sweet Rebels; 1 of 3 votes Minority	Mats Meguenni; 1 of 3 votes Minority	Dziewczyny; 1 of 3 votes Minority	Małgorzata Stankiewicz; 0 of 2 votes	Ada Szulc; 15% to win
Eliminated	Avocado; 0 of 2 votes	William Malcolm; 1 of 3 votes Minority	Sweet Rebels; 1 of 3 votes Minority	Mats Meguenni; 1 of 3 votes Minority	Dziewczyny; 1 of 3 votes Minority	Małgorzata Stankiewicz; 0 of 2 votes	Michał Szpak; 22% to win
Eliminated	Avocado; 0 of 2 votes	William Malcolm; 1 of 3 votes Minority	Sweet Rebels; 1 of 3 votes Minority	Mats Meguenni; 1 of 3 votes Minority	Dziewczyny; 1 of 3 votes Minority	Małgorzata Stankiewicz; 0 of 2 votes	Gienek Loska; 63% to win

- ^1 Sablewska refused to vote as the second one as two of her acts were in bottom two, so Mozil voted instead of her and then she did not have to choose as after two judges' vote there was already a majority.
- ^2 Sablewska was not asked to vote as after other judges' vote there was already a majority.

=== Live show details ===
==== Week 1 (24 April) ====
- Theme: The Biggest Hits of All-Time

Contestants' performances on the first live show
Act	Order	Song	Result
William Malcolm	1	"Jesus He Knows Me"	Safe
Avocado	2	"Freedom"	Bottom two
Mats Meguenni	3	"Uptown Girl"	Safe
Małgorzata Stankiewicz	4	"Love Me Tender"	Safe
Sweet Rebels	5	"Venus"	Bottom two
Ada Szulc	6	"Don't Stop the Music"	Safe
Gienek Loska	7	"It's a Man's Man's Man's World"	Safe
Dziewczyny	8	"Georgia on My Mind"	Safe
Michał Szpak	9	"Knockin' on Heaven's Door"	Safe
Final showdown details
Sweet Rebels	1	"Holding Out for a Hero"	Safe
Avocado	2	"Relax"	Eliminated

Judge's vote to save

- Wojewódzki: Sweet Rebels – gave no objective reason; mentioned that he had allergy to avocado
- Mozil: Sweet Rebels – thought that Sweet Rebels' performances 'mean something', unlike Avocado's performances
- Sablewska refused to vote as the second so Mozil voted instead of her and then she did not have to make a choice as after two judges' votes there was already a majority

==== Week 2 (1 May) ====
- Theme: Songs from films

Contestants' performances on the second live show
Act	Order	Song	Result
William Malcolm	1	"I'm a Believer"	Bottom two
Mats Meguenni	2	"Against All Odds (Take a Look at Me Now)"	Safe
Sweet Rebels	3	"Mamma Mia"	Bottom two
Małgorzata Stankiewicz	4	"I Will Always Love You"	Safe
Michał Szpak	5	"I Don't Want to Miss a Thing"	Safe
Dziewczyny	6	"All That Jazz"	Safe
Ada Szulc	7	"Love Is All Around"	Safe
Gienek Loska	8	"Layla"	Safe
Final showdown details
William Malcolm	1	"Hotel California"	Eliminated
Sweet Rebels	2	"Faith"	Safe

Judge's vote to save

- Sablewska: Sweet Rebels – backed her own act
- Mozil: William Malcolm – backed his own act
- Wojewódzki: Sweet rebels – gave no reason

==== Week 3 (8 May) ====
- Theme: Love songs

Contestants' performances on the third live show
Act	Order	Song	Result
Mats Meguenni	1	"Careless Whisper"	Bottom two
Małgorzata Stankiewicz	2	"The Power of Love"	Safe
Sweet Rebels	3	"Isn't She Lovely?"	Bottom two
Michał Szpak	4	"You Are So Beautiful"	Safe
Gienek Loska	5	"When a Man Loves a Woman"	Safe
Dziewczyny	6	"Lovefool"	Safe
Ada Szulc	7	"Fields of Gold"	Safe
Final showdown details
Sweet Rebels	1	"If I Ain't Got You"	Eliminated
Mats Meguenni	2	"I'm Still Standing"	Safe

Judge's vote to save

- Wojewódzki: Mats Meguenni – backed his own act
- Sablewska: Sweet rebels – backed her own act
- Mozil: Mats Meguenni - gave no reason

==== Week 4 (15 May) ====
- Theme: Big Band
- Group performance: "She Bangs"

Contestants' performances on the fourth live show
Act	Order	Song	Result
Małgorzata Stankiewicz	1	"Fly Me to the Moon"	Safe
Mats Meguenni	2	"You Know My Name"	Bottom two
Dziewczyny	3	"Sway"	Bottom two
Michał Szpak	4	"Fever"	Safe
Ada Szulc	5	"Feeling Good"	Safe
Gienek Loska	6	"My Way"	Safe
Final showdown details
Mats Meguenni	1	"It's My Life"	Eliminated
Dziewczyny	2	"Papaya"	Safe

Judge's vote to save

- Wojewódzki: Mats Meguenni – backed his own act
- Sablewska: Dziewczyny – backed her own act
- Mozil: Dziewczyny – based on final showdown performances

==== Week 5 (22 May) ====
- Theme: Number-one hits; Polish songs

Contestants' performances on the fifth live show
Act	Order	First song	Order	Second song	Result
Dziewczyny	1	"Empire State of Mind"	6	"Szare miraże"	Bottom two
Małgorzata Stankiewicz	2	"Un-Break My Heart"	7	"Aleja gwiazd"	Bottom two
Ada Szulc	3	"Rolling in the Deep"	8	"Pod Papugami"	Safe
Michał Szpak	4	"Sorry Seems to Be the Hardest Word"	9	"Czas nas uczy pogody"	Safe
Gienek Loska	5	"One"	10	"Niepokonani"	Safe
Final showdown details
Dziewczyny	1	"Brotha"			Eliminated
Małgorzata Stankiewicz	2	"Im więcej Ciebie, tym mniej"			Safe

Judge's vote to save

- Mozil: Małgorzata Stankiewicz – backed his own act
- Sablewska: Dziewczyny – backed her own act
- Wojewódzki: Małgorzata Stankiewicz – stated that he believed Małgorzata Stankiewicz would make the stage bubble

==== Week 6: Semi-final (29 May) ====
- Theme: Biggest Pop music songs

Contestants' performances on the sixth live show
Act	Order	First song	Order	Second song	Result
Małgorzata Stankiewicz	1	"Moon River"	5	"Co mi Panie dasz?"	Bottom two
Ada Szulc	2	"The Sound of Silence"	6	"Ironic"	Safe
Michał Szpak	3	"Californication"	7	"Wspomnienie"	Bottom two
Gienek Loska	4	"Hello"	8	"Wymyśliłem Ciebie"	Safe
Final showdown details
Małgorzata Stankiewicz	1	"Dmuchawce, latawce, wiatr"			Eliminated
Michał Szpak	2	"Imagine"			Safe

Judge's vote to save

- Wojewódzki: Michał Szpak – backed his own act
- Mozil: Michał Szpak – based on the final showdown performance
- Sablewska was not asked to vote as after other judges' votes there was already a majority

==== Week 7: Final (5 June) ====
- Theme: No theme (songs the mentor and contestants believe will get them through the final); celebrity duets
- Celebrity duet performers:
  - Basia Trzetrzelewska with Ada Szulc
  - Maciej Maleńczuk with Gienek Loska
  - Alexandra Burke with Michał Szpak
- Group performance: "Billionaire" (performed by all top 9 contestants)
- Celebrity performers: Alexandra Burke ("Bad Boys")

Contestants' performances on the final live show
Act	Order	First song	Order	Second song (duet)	Result
Ada Szulc	1	"Fields of Gold"	4	"A Gift" duet with Basia Trzetrzelewska	Eliminated
Gienek Loska	2	"It's a Man's Man's Man's World"	5	"You Can't Judge a Book by the Cover" duet with Maciej Maleńczuk	Winner
Michał Szpak	3	"You Are So Beautiful"	6	"Hallelujah" duet with Alexandra Burke	Runner-up

== Ratings ==
Episode	Date	Official rating 4+	Share 4+ (%)	Official rating 16-49	Share 16-49 (%)
Auditions 1	6 March	4 302 923	24,10%	2 495 031	31,43%
Auditions 2	13 March	4 975 529	28,24%	2 720 970	35,64%
Auditions 3	20 March	4 741 172	26,50%	2 565 091	32,06%
Auditions 4	27 March	4 729 813	26,88%	2 585 977	34,56%
Auditions 5	3 April	4 554 344	26,81%	2 498 301	34,33%
Bootcamp	10 April	5 514 716	32,73%	3 033 737	40,14%
Judges' houses	17 April	4 391 736	26,47%	2 435 742	34,84%
Live show 1	24 April	3 863 978	24,67%	2 010 928	30,56%
Live show 2	1 May	3 785 429	22,62%	2 224 629	30,50%
Live show 3	8 May	4 382 362	27,30%	2 445 186	34,78%
Live show 4	15 May	4 309 266	26,67%	2 363 216	33,49%
Live show 5	22 May	4 221 245	28,83%	2 261 164	35,52%
Live show 6	29 May	4 457 276	29,59%	2 373 473	36,74%
Live show 7	5 June	4 694 085	31,68%	2 658 075	41,73%
Average	2011	4 476 818	27,35%	2 465 433	34,71%
