= X Factor (Polish TV series) =

- X Factor logo (2013–present)
- Genre: Reality
- Created by: Simon Cowell
- Directed by: Wojciech Iwański
- Presented by: Patricia Kazadi (3–4); Jarosław Kuźniar (1–2)
- Judges: Kuba Wojewódzki (1–4); Czesław Mozil (1–4); Tatiana Okupnik (2–4); Ewa Farna (4); Maja Sablewska (1)
- Voices of: Michał Skolmowski
- Country of origin: Poland
- Original language: Polish
- No. of seasons: 4
- No. of episodes: 56

Production
- Producer: Katarzyna Szałańska
- Production locations: Various (auditions); Transcolor Studio, Szeligi near Warsaw (live shows)
- Running time: 85–120 minutes
- Production company: FremantleMedia

Original release
- Network: TVN (also TVN HD and TVN HD+1)
- Release: 6 March 2011 – 31 May 2014

Related
- The X Factor (UK)

X Factor was a Polish talent show based on a British show The X Factor and broadcast on TVN. The first series premiered on 6 March 2011. On 27 November 2010, during the season 3 finale of Poland's Got Talent, Marcin Prokop confirmed that the auditions would be held in January 2011. That was also the first public statement from TVN about X Factor.

The main prize is PLN100,000 funded by Apart and a recording contract with label Sony Music.

== Format ==
The competition is split into three categories: Solo Singers aged 16–24, Solo Singers aged 25 and over and Vocal Groups. Before the Judges' houses stage each judge gets one category which he will be mentoring.

There are five stages to X Factor competition:

- Stage 1: Pre-auditions (open auditions where producers decide who will perform in front of the judges)
- Stage 2: Auditions (filmed auditions with the judges and a live audience)
- Stage 3: Eliminations (known as 'Bootcamp' in the UK version)
- Stage 4: Judges' houses
- Stage 5: Live shows

=== Auditions ===
The filming begins at this stage. The acts who got a phone call from the producers after the pre-auditions are invited to take part in the actual auditions with the judges and a live audience. They sing one or two songs and then the judges vote. These who got through will participate in Eliminations.

=== Eliminations ===
Originally known as Bootcamp. Each act who received at least two yeses from the judges during the auditions takes part in the Eliminations stage, which lasts for two days. Here the contestants are allocated to their categories. Each category sings one song and then the judges decides who leaves the competition and who stays in the selection process. Remaining acts have to prepare with a help of the vocal coaches one chosen song that they will perform in front of the panel. Then the judges choose five acts from each category that will get through to the Judges' houses stage. Now both the judges and the contestants find out which judge will be mentoring which category.

=== Judges' houses ===
This stage lasts for two days. The acts visit their mentors' homes. Each judge picks up a guest judge who will help him. Each contestant sing one song. Then the mentor and the person who helps him decide which three acts will take part in the live shows in the studio in Warsaw.

=== Live shows ===
Stage built for X Factor live shows in Transcolor Studio in Szeligi near Warsaw

Each week each mentor chooses songs and outfit for their acts. They also judge the other mentors' contestants. The viewers vote for their favorites by sending an SMS or phoning. After closing the lines and counting the votes Jarosław Kuźniar announces the results in no particular order. The two acts who received the fewest votes will perform again in a final showdown. Then the judges decide by voting who will leave the competition.

In the final episode the three remaining acts sing two songs, including one performed with an invited music star. The viewers choose the winner by SMS voting or phoning. The winner gets PLN100,000 funded by Apart and a recording contract with label Sony Music.

== Season summary ==
Color key

Team Maja
Team Kuba

Team Czesław
Team Tatiana

Team Ewa

Season	First aired	Last aired	Winner	Runner-up	Third place	Winning mentor	Host	Mentors (chairs' order)			
Season	First aired	Last aired	Winner	Runner-up	Third place	Winning mentor	Host	1	2	3	4
1	6 March 2011	5 June 2011	Gienek Loska	Michał Szpak	Ada Szulc	Czesław Mozil	Jarosław Kuźniar	Czesław	Maja	Kuba	N/A
2	3 March 2012	2 June 2012	Dawid Podsiadło	Marcin Spenner	The Chance	Tatiana Okupnik	Jarosław Kuźniar	Czesław	Tatiana	Kuba	N/A
3	23 February 2013	26 May 2013	Klaudia Gawor	Grzegorz Hyży	Wojciech Ezzat	Kuba Wojewódzki	Jarosław Kuźniar	Czesław	Tatiana	Kuba	N/A
4	1 March 2014	31 May 2014	Artem Furman	Marta Bijan	Anna Tacikowska	Czesław Mozil	Jarosław Kuźniar	Czesław	Tatiana	Ewa	Kuba

== Judges and presenter ==
=== Judges ===
Promo picture of X Factor featuring the judges and the presenter

On 15 January 2011 on Dzień Dobry TVN it was officially confirmed that Czesław Mozil and Kuba Wojewódzki will join the judges panel and on 19 January 2011 web portal plejada.pl revealed that Maja Sablewska would be the third judge.

Since the first news about Polish version of X Factor was released, many web portals and journals have speculated on the make up of the judges panel. On 27 November 2010 Polish gossip webpage pudelek.pl reported that Kuba Wojewódzki, Natalia Kukulska, Patrycja Markowska (singer) and Piotr Metz (popular music journalist) had been offered to join the judges panel. A few days later Party magazine reported that Edyta Górniak would appear as a judge on TVN's newest show. It quoted a person connected with TVN: Edyta will serve as a judge in new show, which TVN is preparing for spring. However, there was no confirmation if the mentioned show was X Factor.

On 14 December "Super Express" revealed that Piotr Metz and Przemysław Nieużyła (manager) are finalising their contracts. On 13 December 2010 Ewa Wojciechowska, editor in chief of connected with TVN website plejada.pl revealed on Dzień Dobry TVN that according to her knowledge Maja Sablewska (Górniak's manager) and Kuba Wojewódzki had been offered to serve as the judges. She also added that the third person to join the panel would be a man. On 22 December 2010 pudelek.pl reported that Wojewódzki, Sablewska and Metz had already signed their contracts.

Elżbieta Zapendowska, former judge on Idol was also thought to join the panel, though she denied these rumours. My friends call me and congratulate me and I don't know for what. Nobody from TVN gave me any offers! – she says in an interview with a celebrity magazine Takie jest życie. The journal revealed that the final decisions had not been made yet as TVN's programme director, Edward Miszczak was in hospital. However he was said to have Kuba Wojewódzki and Maja Sablewska as his favorites.

Takie jest życie talked to a person connected with TVN who reported that many celebrities and their managers called the network or the director and offered themselves as perfect candidates for the judges. Some of them are ready to work for nothing. – he said. Tomasz Lubert, Robert Gawliński, Robert Janson and Robert Kozyra were said to be interested in a judging role. Krzysztof "Kasa" Kasowski has even published his offer online: I recommend my humble person as a perfect judge on 'X Factor'. I have discovered many talents.

On 11 January 2011 Super Express revealed that all the judges placements had been already filled. On the next day journal Fakt reported that Czesław Mozil was likely to judge X Factor alongside Kuba Wojewódzki. Mozil was to confirm this on Facebook by writing: And if I knock the TV at 20:00 on Sunday it doesn't mean that day before I didn't play in your village. I count on support and this all is because of these aunts, who watch me on TV too little... This is my independence. However the official confirmation has not been given yet. On 13 January 2011 wirtualnemedia.pl reported that Czesław Mozil had already signed his contract. Website also informed that Kuba Wojewódzki was to join the panel, though he had not signed the contract yet. The name of the third judge was still unknown. The website's news was quoted by web portal Onet.pl, which is connected with TVN, adding that the channel had not confirmed it yet. On 14 January 2011 Czesław Mozil demented the rumours about his participation in X Factor on Facebook. However, on the next day he confirmed on Dzień Dobry TVN that he would judge X Factor alongside Kuba Wojewódzki.

=== Presenter ===
On 15 January 2011 Jarosław Kuźniar confirmed on Dzień Dobry TVN that he would host the show.

Until the confirmation, many newspapers and web portals had speculated on who would host the show. Media2.pl reported that according to unofficial information Marcin Prokop and Szymon Hołownia, a famous duo of hosts of Poland's Got Talent were thought to take part in talks with the producers.

On 11 January 2011 popular journal Super Express reported that two TVN24 presenters Jarosław Kuźniar and Marcin Żebrowski were fighting for the presenting role. Both of them are hosts of morning show You Get Up and You Know. The journal added that Bartosz Węglarczyk, host of TVN's morning show Dzień Dobry TVN and co-host of the season 1 finale of Poland's Next Top Model was also taken into account. Super Express quoted a person connected with TVN: In my opinion the final battle may be between Kuźniar and Żebrowski. It is not a coincidence that the latter has been recently on air more often. He has even hosted the New Year's Eve programme on TVN24. However, according to unofficial sources, Żebrowski was to refuse the offer.

On 13 January 2011 wirtualnemedia.pl confirmed that Jarosław Kuźniar was one of the candidates. The news was also quoted by Onet.pl. Finally, Kuźniar was present at the pre-audition in Warsaw on 14 January 2011, which suggested that previous rumours were true.

On 21 November 2012 it was announced that Kuźniar would not be back to present the series for personal reasons and his commitments to TVN24. On 13 December 2012, Patricia Kazadi was confirmed as the new presenter. It was reported that Marcin Prokop, Szymon Majewski and Agnieszka Szulim had also been in running for the role.

=== Judges' categories and their contestants ===
In each season, each judge is allocated a category to mentor and chooses three acts to progress to the live finals. This table shows, for each season, which category each judge was allocated and which acts he or she put through to the live finals.

Key:

– Winning judge/category. Winners are in bold, eliminated contestants in small font.

Season	Kuba Wojewódzki	Maja Sablewska	Czesław Mozil	—N/a
One	**16-24s** Michał Szpak; Ada Szulc; Mats Meguenni	**Groups**; Dziewczyny; Sweet Rebels; Avocado	**Over 25s** **Gienek Loska**; Małgorzata Stankiewicz; William Malcolm	—N/a
Two	Kuba Wojewódzki	Tatiana Okupnik	Czesław Mozil	—N/a
Two	**Over 25s** Marcin Spenner; Joanna Kwaśnik; Paweł Binkiewicz	**16-24s** **Dawid Podsiadło**; Ewelina Lisowska; Anna Antonik	**Groups**; The Chance; Soul City; De Facto	—N/a
Three	**16-24s** **Klaudia Gawor**; Maja Hyży; Filip Mettler	**Groups**; Girls On Fire; Aicha and Asteya; The Voices	**Over 25s** Grzegorz Hyży; Wojciech Ezzat; Olga Barej	—N/a
Four	Kuba Wojewódzki	Tatiana Okupnik	Czesław Mozil	Ewa Farna
Four	**Groups and Bands**; Trzynasta w Samo Południe; Cała Góra Barwinków; Hatbreakers	**Over 25s** Anna Tacikowska; Joao de Sousa; Karolina Duszkiewicz	**Boys**; **Artem Furman**; Jakub Jonkisz; Kuba Jurzyk	**Girls**; Marta Bijan; Magdalena Bal; Daria Zawiałow

== Reception ==
=== Series averages ===
Season	First aired	Last aired	Episodes	Average	Share	Share 16–49
Series 1	6 March 2011	5 June 2011	14	4.48	27.3%	34.7%
Series 2	3 March 2012	2 June 2012	14	3.14	21.4%	27.0%
Series 3	23 February 2013	26 May 2013	14	2.96	19.9%	22.5%
Series 4	1 March 2014	31 May 2014	14	2.25	14.7%	18.1%

== Albums by former contestants ==
- Gienek Loska (season 1, winner)
  - Lepiej niż wczoraj feat. Alek Możek (9 October 2009)
  - Hazardzista (21 November 2011)
  - Dom (16 April 2013)
- Michał Szpak (season 1, runner-up)
  - XI (EP) (13 December 2011)
  - Byle być sobą (13 November 2015)
- Ada Szulc (season 1, 3rd place)
  - 1000 miejsc feat. DJ Adamus (12 November 2013)
- Dziewczyny (season 1, 5th place)
  - Dziewczyny z sąsiedztwa (8 March 2010)
- William Malcolm (season 1, 8th place)
  - Takes One To Know One (3 November 2013)
- Dawid Podsiadło (season 2, winner)
  - Comfort And Happiness (28 May 2013)
  - Ruby Dress Skinny Dog with Curly Heads (21 October 2014)
  - Annoyance and Disappointment (6 November 2015)
- Ewelina Lisowska (season 2, 4th place)
  - Ewelina Lisowska (EP)(7 July 2012)
  - Aero-Plan (7 May 2013)
  - Nowe horyzonty (28 October 2014)
- Aicha from duet Aicha & Asteya (season 3, 6th place)
  - Magija (19 January 2013)
- Grzegorz Hyży (season 3, runner-up)
  - Z całych sił (27 May 2014)
  - Momenty (12 May 2017)
- Maja Hyży (season 3, 4th place)
  - W chmurach (24 March 2015)
- Trzynasta w samo południe (season 4, 5th place)
  - Hell Yeah (21 October 2014)
- Cała Góra Barwinków (season 4, 6th place)
  - Cała Góra Barwinków (2004)
  - 24 godziny (1 January 2007)
  - Kocham kłopoty (22 February 2010)
  - Beat 2 Meet U (10 August 2013)
- Daria Zawiałow (season 4, 9th place)
  - A Kysz! (3 March 2017)
  - Helsinki (8 March 2019)
  - Wojny i noce (11 June 2021)
- Marta Bijan (season 4, 2nd place)
  - Melancholia (21 September 2018)
  - Sztuka płakania (28 May 2021)
