= Loska =

Loska is a surname. Notable people with the surname include:

- Gienek Loska (born 1975), Polish singer-songwriter and guitarist
- Stanislav Loska (born 1968), Czech alpine skier
- Tomasz Loska (born 1996), Polish footballer
- Tony Loska (born 1950), English footballer
