= Maja Sablewska =

- Born: 5 April 1980 (age 46); Sosnowiec, Poland
- Origin: Poland
- Occupation: Music manager
- Years active: 2000-present
- Label: Universal Music Poland

Maja Sablewska (born 5 April 1980) is a Polish music manager, stylist and television personality. In 2011 she was a judge on TV show X Factor. Since 2013 she has been hosting several makeover television shows.

== Early life and the music manager career ==
As a 17-year-old she raised Natalia Kukulska's fan club. Many meetings with her after the concerts made their relationship closer. When she was 19, she was offered by the singer a babysitter job, which was the reason why she moved from her family town Sosnowiec to Warsaw. A year later she was noticed by Katarzyna Kanclerz who was connected with Universal Music Poland.

During her work in the label she met Dorota Rabczewska, the vocalist of Virgin. When the band suspended in 2007 the singer asked Sablewska to take care of her solo career.

In Autumn 2009 she took care of another artist - debuting Marina Łuczenko. This was not accepted by Rabczewska and later the manager turned down working for Doda. Their co-operation ended up on 26 November 2009.

Soon media reported that Sablewska had become the manager of Edyta Górniak, which was confirmed by both of them on 28 March 2010 on Dzień Dobry TVN.

On 23 January 2011 Edyta Górniak resigned Sablewska's service, which she announced by sending a statement to the press on the next day.

A month later, on 18 February 2011, Marina Łuczenko ended the co-operation with the manager.

On 10 March 2011 web page plejada.pl reported that Sablewska was going to launch a music management company with Żaneta Szlagowska. Patricia Kazadi is said to be their first artist.

== X Factor ==
In late 2010 she was offered a judging role on the TV show X Factor by TVN. In January 2011 it was confirmed that she had accepted it. She served in the judging panel alongside Kuba Wojewódzki and Czesław Mozil. In 2012, she left the show and was replaced by Tatiana Okupnik.
