= On My Own (Tatiana Okupnik album) =

Studio album by Tatiana Okupnik
- Released: April 13, 2007
- Recorded: 2006/2007
- Genre: Pop, rhythm and blues, Jazz
- Label: Kayax (Kayax Production)
- Producer: Lenny White

Tatiana Okupnik chronology
On My Own (2007)	Spider Web (2011)

On My Own is an album released by a Polish pop singer Tatiana Okupnik.

== Track listing ==
1. Introducing
2. Tell Me Do I Drive U Crazy (Striptease)
3. Don't Hold Back (Find Your Way)
4. Shake It
5. Hey Big Spender
6. Around The World
7. Tell Me What U Really Want
8. Keep It On The Low
9. Afterglow
10. The Look (Of Love)
11. Lovin' You (cover of Minnie Riperton's "Lovin' You")
12. The Woman In Me
13. On My Own
