= Tesco Value (band) =

Danish rock band (2000–2007)

- Origin: Copenhagen, Denmark
- Years active: 2000-2007
- Labels: Cope, Mystic Production
- Past members: Czesław Mozil; Magdalena Entell; Linda Edsjo; Daniel Heløy Davidsen; Martin Bennebo

Tesco Value was a music band created in Denmark in 2000, playing alternative music. The band was founded by Czesław Mozil. In 2002 the band was playing on Roskilde Festival.

== Members ==
- Czesław Mozil (Denmark/Poland) - vocals
- Magdalena Entell (Sweden) - contrabass
- Linda Edsjo (Sweden) - percussion
- Daniel Heløy Davidsen (Denmark/Norway) - guitar
- Martin Bennebo (Denmark) - accordion

== Discography ==
- Tesco Value (2002; 2008, re-edited twice, POL: gold disc)
- Violin Girl (single)
- Songs For The Gatekeeper (2005)
- Official Bootleg (2005)
- Piosenka Dla Pajączka (single)
- Tesco Value (2 CDs; re-edition as Czesław Śpiewa/Tesco Value) (2008)
- Songs For The Gatekeeper (re-edition as Czesław Śpiewa/Tesco Value) (23 March 2009)
