= Grzegorz Hyży =

Polish singer-songwriter (born 1987)

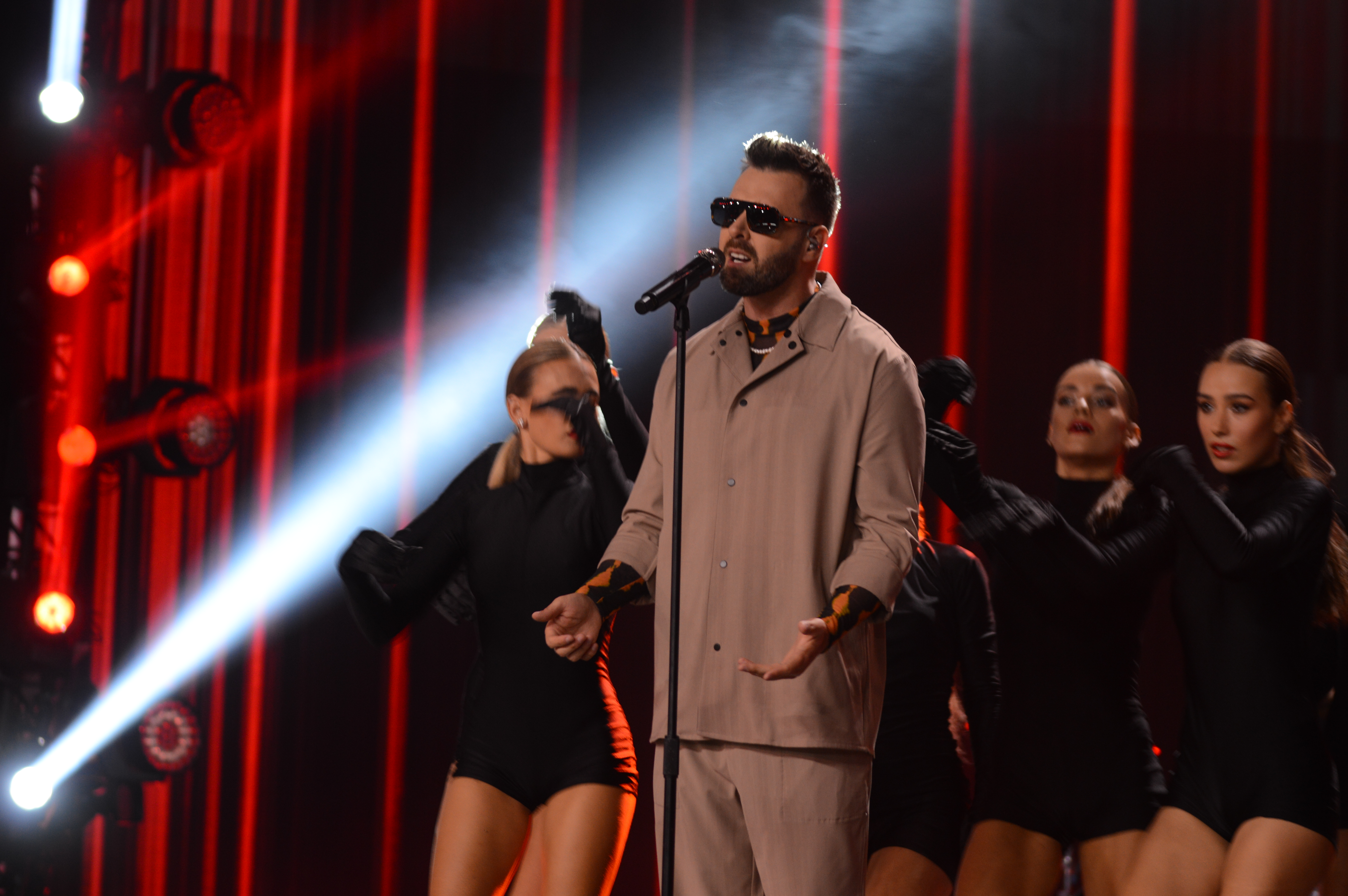
- Grzegorz Hyży, Top of the Top Sopot Festival 2022

Background information
- Born: Grzegorz Hyży; 27 May 1987 (age 39); Gniezno, Poland
- Genres: Pop, Pop Rock, Indie Pop
- Occupation: Singer-songwriter
- Instruments: Vocals, guitar
- Years active: 2010–present

Grzegorz Hyży (born 27 May 1987, Gniezno) is a Polish singer-songwriter, who rose to fame after finishing as the runner-up in the third series of X Factor in 2013. He is currently signed to Sony Music.

== Debut album ==
In March 2014, Hyży released his debut single "Na chwilę" and is set to release his album later in the year.

== Discography ==
=== Studio albums ===
Title	Album details	Peak chart positions	Certifications
Title	Album details	POL	Certifications
Z całych sił (with Tabb)	Released: 27 May 2014; Label: Gorgo, Sony Music Entertainment Poland; Format: CD, digital download, streaming	9	POL: Platinum
Momenty	Released: 12 May 2017; Label: Sony Music Entertainment Poland; Format: CD, digital download, streaming	6	POL: Platinum
Epilog	Released: 25 October 2024; Label: Sony Music Entertainment Poland; Format: CD, digital download, streaming	34	

=== Singles ===
Title	Year	Peak chart positions		Certifications	Album
Title	Year	POL Air.	POL Stream.	Certifications	Album
"Na chwilę" (with Tabb)	2014	1	*		Z całych sił
"Wstaję" (with Tabb)	2014	2	*		Z całych sił
"Pusty dom" (with Tabb)	2014	5	*		Z całych sił
"Zagadka" (with Tabb)	2015	19	*		Z całych sił
"Pod wiatr"	2016	2	*	POL: 3× Platinum	Momenty
"O Pani!"	2017	1	81	POL: 3× Platinum	Momenty
"Noc i dzień"	2017	5	*	POL: Gold	Momenty
"Podatek od miłości" (with Kayah)	2017	5	*	POL: Platinum	Podatek od miłości (soundtrack)
"Niech pomyślą, że to ja"	2018	3	*	POL: Platinum	Momenty
"Pech to nie grzech"	2018	12	*	POL: Gold	Pech to nie grzech (soundtrack)
"Król nocy"	2020	7	*	POL: Gold	Epilog
"Kochanie to ja!"	2022	9	*	POL: Platinum	Epilog
"I ten numer na lato"	2022	—	*		Epilog
"Sztos"	2022	12	*		Epilog
"Tańcz"	2023	—	—		Epilog
"Z nikim aż tak"	2024	49	—		Epilog
"—" denotes items which were not released in that country or failed to chart. "*" denotes the chart did not exist at that time.

=== As featured artist ===
Title	Year	Album
"Puls" (Kasia Cerekwicka featuring Grzegorz Hyży)	2015	Między słowami

== Awards and nominations ==
Year	Ceremony	Nominated work	Category	Result
2014	Eska Music Awards	"Na chwilę"	Best Hit	Nominated
2014	Eska Music Awards	Grzegorz Hyży	Best Radio Debut	Won
2014	Eska Music Awards	Grzegorz Hyży	Best Artist on the Internet	Nominated
2015	Fryderyk	Grzegorz Hyży	New Face of Fonography	Nominated
2017	Eska Music Awards	Grzegorz Hyży	Best Male Artist	Nominated
2018	Fryderyk	Momenty	Album of the Year – Pop	Nominated
2021	Fryderyk	Grzegorz Hyży	Author of the Year	Nominated
2021	Fryderyk	Michał "Fox" Król, Grzegorz Hyży, Daniel Walczak	Composer of the Year	Nominated
2021	Fryderyk	"Król nocy"	Song of the Year	Nominated
