= Gienek Loska =

Polish guitarist (1975–2020)

Gienek Loska: Генадзій Лоска
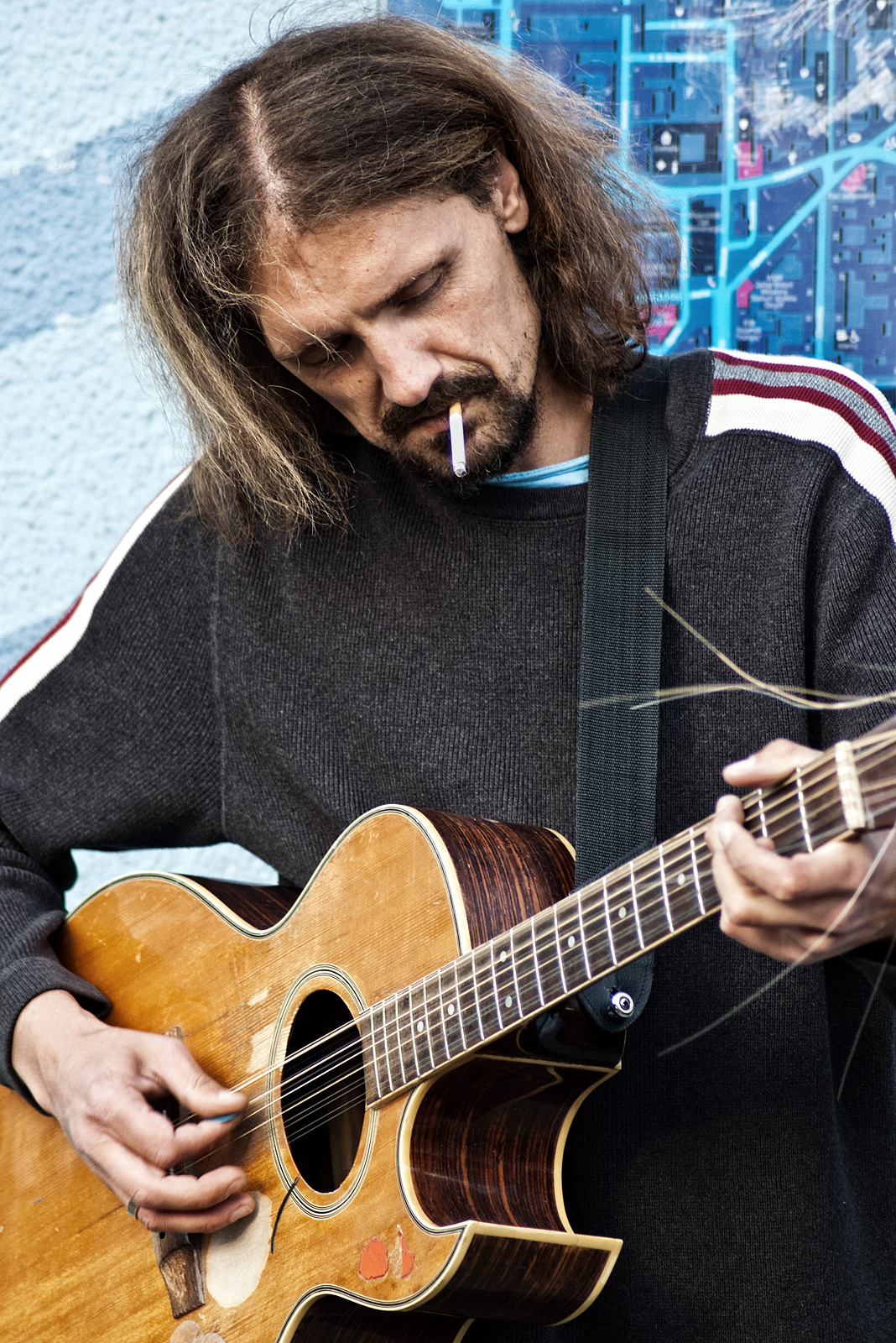
- Gienek Loska performing in Warsaw (May 2011)

Background information
- Born: Henadzi Loska; 8 January 1975; Byelaazyorsk, Byelorussian SSR, Soviet Union (now Belarus)
- Origin: Wrocław, Poland
- Died: 9 September 2020 (aged 45) Byelaazyorsk, Belarus
- Genres: Rock; blues rock; blues
- Occupations: Singer; songwriter; guitarist
- Instruments: Vocals; guitar
- Years active: 1990–2018
- Label: Sony Music Entertainment Poland
- Website: GienekLoskaBand.pl

Gienek Loska or Henadzi Loska (Belarusian: Генадзій Лоска; 8 January 1975 – 9 September 2020) was a Belarusian and Polish singer-songwriter, guitarist, and street performer; who rose to fame after winning the first season of the Polish X Factor in 2011. Since his arrival to Poland in early 1990s, he lived in Białystok, Kraków, and from 2004 in Wrocław, Poland.

== Biography ==
Born in the town of Byelaazyorsk in the Brest Region of the Byelorussian SSR (now part of Belarus), Loska began playing guitar at the age of 13. His first performances were held at the Minsk Metro.

Loska was the co-founder and longtime member of the blues rock band Seven B, and also a lead singer and guitarist of Gienek Loska Band. He was known to the public due to his repeated performances on streets of bigger Polish cities. In 2009, he was invited to make a record with Alek Mrozek, a known Polish composer.

He took part in several TV talent shows:

- Szansa na Sukces – in 2004, with the band Wilki
- Mam talent! – third edition
- X Factor Poland – first edition – in 2011, winner of main prize

== Seven B ==
In 1990, he co-founded a band called Seven B in Grodno, together with Andrei Makarem Makarewicz. Upon arrival to Poland in 1992, the group toured in Augustów and Białystok. A year later, they came to Kraków where they played together until 2005. Seven B usually toured as a quintet, and recorded three albums: Rocktales, Make up your mind, and Acoustic. They disbanded in 2006, which lead to the creation of a far more successful Gienek Loska Band.

== Personal life ==
He married Agnieszka Stawicka in 2004, with whom he had a daughter, Aleksandra. He declared himself an Eastern Orthodox Christian.

== Discography ==
- Lepiej niż wczoraj (with Alek Mrożek), CD released 9 October 2009 by B&J Music.
- Hazardzista, CD released 21 November 2011 by Sony Music Entertainment Poland, digital download. Sales: 15,000 plus. Certification: Gold.
- Dom, CD released 16 April 2013 by Sony Music Entertainment Poland, digital download.
