= Szeligi, Warsaw West County =

Szeligi
- Village
- Location within Poland
- Coordinates: 52°13′45″N 20°51′48″E
- Country: Poland
- Voivodeship: Masovian
- County: Warsaw West
- Gmina: Ożarów Mazowiecki
- Population: 160

Szeligi [ʂɛˈliɡi] is a village in the administrative district of Gmina Ożarów Mazowiecki, within Warsaw West County, Masovian Voivodeship, in east-central Poland.
