= Andrzej Zaucha (singer) =

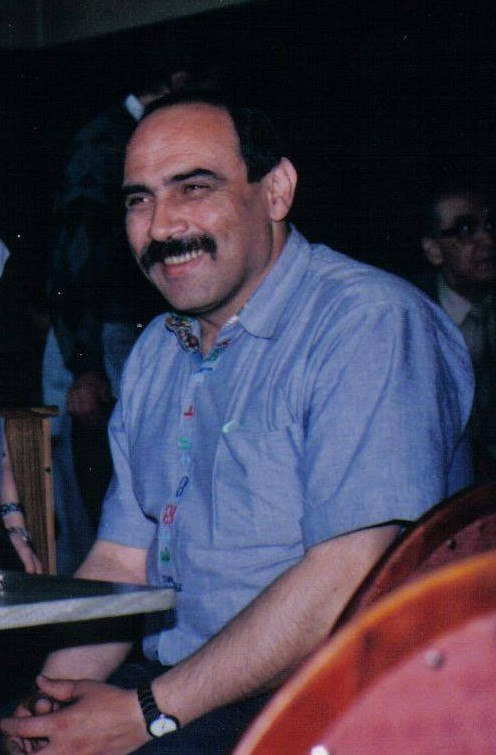
- Andrzej Zaucha in 1991

Background information
- Born: 12 January 1949; Kraków, Poland
- Origin: (Poland)
- Died: 10 October 1991 (aged 42) Kraków, Poland
- Genres: Jazz, pop, rhythm and blues, jazz fusion
- Occupations: Singer, saxophonist, drummer, actor
- Instruments: Saxophone, drum kit
- Years active: 1968-1991
- Labels: Polskie Nagrania Muza, Wifon, Tonpress

Andrzej Zaucha (Polish pronunciation: [ˈandʐɛj zaˈuxa]; 12 January 1949 – 10 October 1991) was a Polish rhythm & blues and pop-jazz singer, occasionally also an actor. He was a self-taught musician who never took any professional vocal lessons.

== Biography ==
Zaucha was born and lived in Kraków. In his teens, he achieved nationwide success in canoeing. After school he became a typesetter. Zaucha never had any musical education, however, he was raised in a musical environment as his father was a drummer in the band that performed small gigs at the dancing-parties. Therefore, after a few years, Andrzej performed as a drummer in several musical groups, before becoming the lead-vocalist of a jazz fusion band Dżamble. He released only one album with them, Wołanie o słońce nad światem, and subsequently joined another group, Anawa, with whom he released a self-titled LP in 1973.

He embarked on a solo musical career by releasing a single in 1980. It was followed by the concept album Wszystkie stworzenia duże i małe in 1983, with the popular title song recorded with Ewa Bem. In 1985, Zaucha performed at the National Festival of Polish Song in Opole. He also appeared in cameos in several Polish feature films. His second album, Stare, nowe, najnowsze was released in 1987 and included popular tracks "Bądź moim natchnieniem" and "C'est la vie – Paryż z pocztówki".

In 1988 he released the song "Byłaś serca biciem" which would become one of his biggest hits. The song was performed at the Opole Festival in the same year where it won an award. The following year, Zaucha released an English language, self-titled album. He then recorded one of the two existing Polish versions of the theme song for the Gummi Bears.

Zaucha was shot and killed in his home town Kraków at the age of 42, by French film director, Yves Goulais, along with Goulais's wife Zuzanna whom he suspected of having an affair with Zaucha.

== Discography ==
- 1971: Wołanie o słońce nad światem (with Dżamble)
- 1973: Anawa (with Anawa)
- 1983: Wszystkie stworzenia duże i małe
- 1987: Stare, nowe, najnowsze
- 1989: Andrzej Zaucha
- 1992: Ostatnia płyta
