= Jarosław Kuźniar =

Polish television and radio presenter (born 1978)

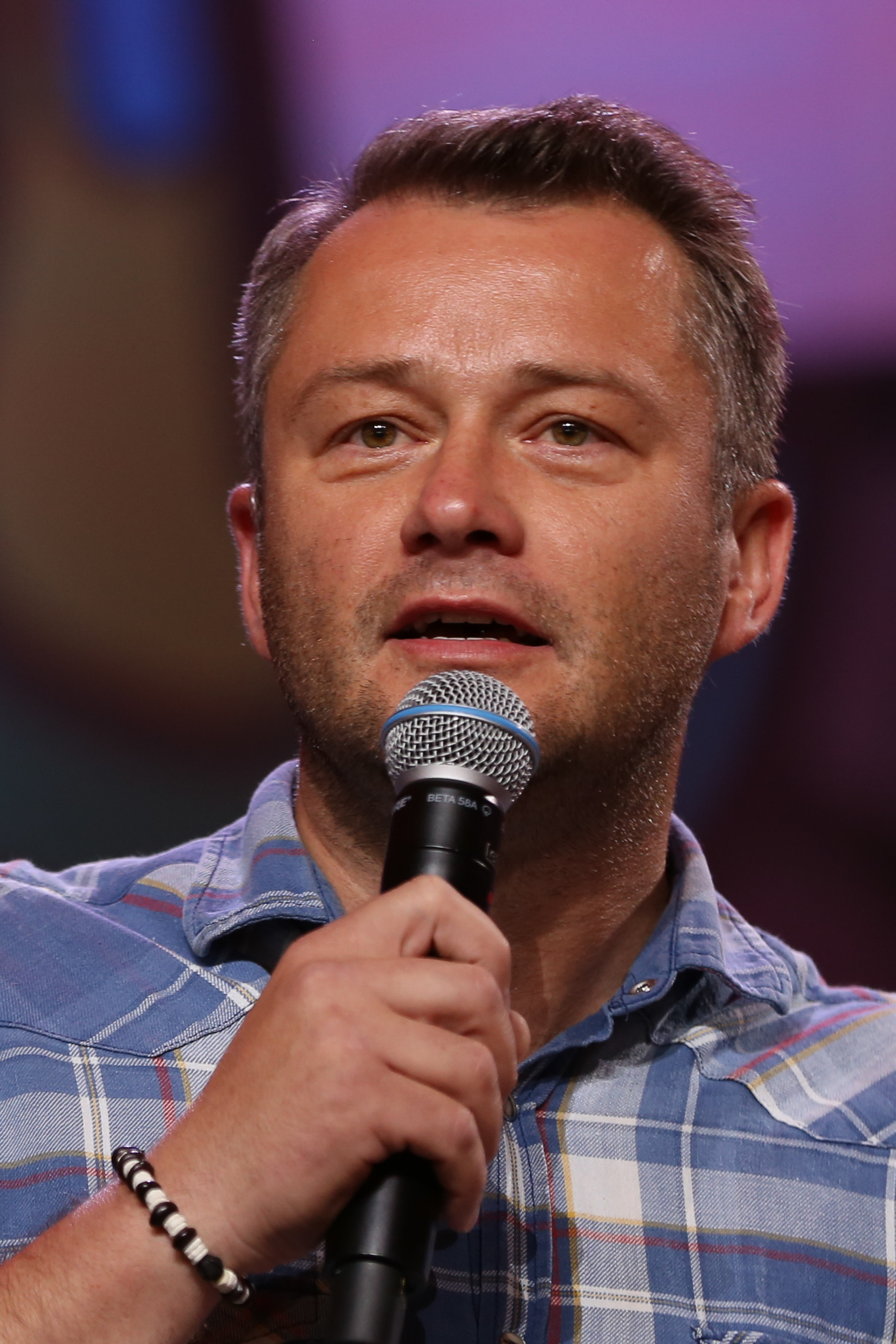
- Jaroslaw Kuzniar at the Pol'and'Rock Festival in 2019
- Born: Kamil Kuzniar; 29 January 1978 (age 48); Bielawa, Poland
- Education: Wrocław University
- Occupations: Television presenter, Radio presenter
- Years active: 1999–present
- Notable credit(s): You Get Up and You Know; Very Political Talk; X Factor

Jarosław Kuźniar (born 29 January 1978) is a Polish television and radio presenter. Connected with TVN and TVN24 from 2010 to 2016. He was host of the TV show X Factor in 2011 and 2012.

== Biography ==
He graduated from High School No. 1 in Dzierżoniów. Then, he studied at the University of Wrocław, where he received a B.A. in Philology, field of study journalism.

At the beginning of his career, he was connected with Sudety Radio (Sudeten Mts. Radio) and Sudecka Television (Sudeten TV). He also worked in Polskie Radio Wrocław. In 1999 he moved to Warsaw, where in Polskie Radio Program III he hosted Zapraszamy do Trójki. Then he worked in Radio Zet for 5 years, where he prepared afternoon news and Wydarzenia Dnia. For more than a year he was a columnist in ?dlaczego magazine.

Since 6 January 2007, he has been working in TVN24, where he is the host of the morning show You Get Up and You Know. From 26 July 2010 to 10 September 2010, he hosted Very Political Talk, which filled in the timeslot of Rymanowski's Talk during the holiday. Since September 2010, the programme has been on air only on Fridays. From Monday to Thursday he still hosts You Get Up and You Know. On 30 May 2016 he left TVN Group.

== X Factor ==
From 2011, he hosted the first two seasons of the Polish version of the TV talent program X Factor.

== Awards ==
In 2009 he received Wiktor in the category Discovery of the Year and MediaTor in the category InstigaTOR. He was also nominated for Telekamery in the category of News.
