= Tatiana Okupnik =

Polish singer, composer and songwriter (born 1978)

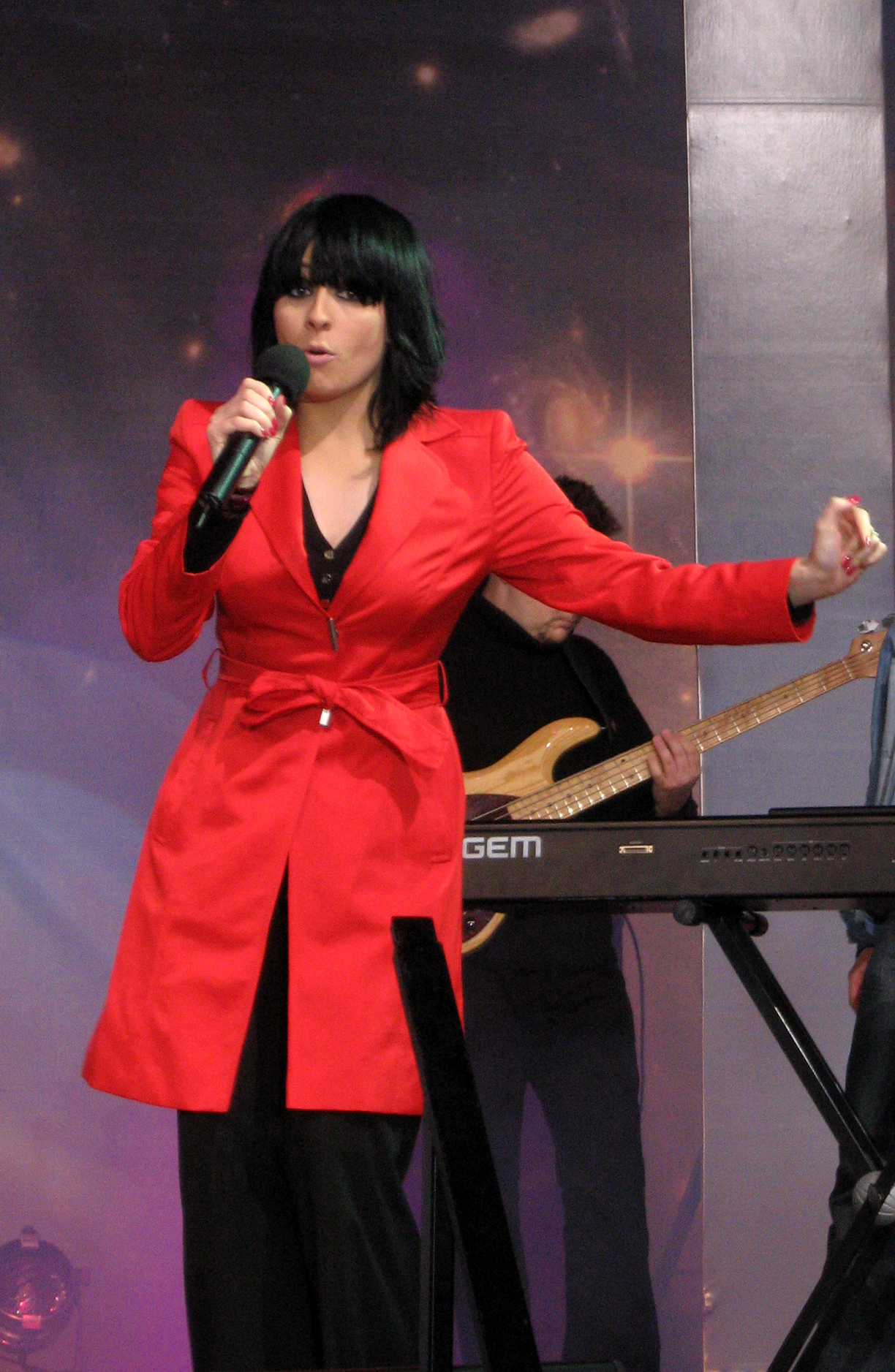
- Okupnik in 2007
- Born: 2 September 1978 (age 48); Łódź, Polish People's Republic
- Education: University of Łódź
- Occupations: Singer, television personality
- Spouse: Michał Micielski
- Musical career
- Genres: Pop, R&B, Soul, Jazz
- Years active: 1998–present
- Labels: Kayax, Sony Music Entertainment Poland, Warner Music Poland
- Member of: Blue Café
- Website: tatianaofficial.com

Tatiana Olga Okupnik (born 2 September 1978, Łódź, Poland) is a Polish singer, composer and songwriter. She has a characteristic, unique voice timbre. She has collaborated with musicians such as Tim Hutton, Wyclef Jean, Lenny White and was a member of Blue Café, a Polish band, where she was lead singer from the band's early years until 2005. In 2012, Okupnik joined the judging panel on the second series of the Polish reality television competition X Factor.

== Discography ==
=== Studio albums ===
| Title | Album details | Peak chart positions | Sales | Certifications |
| Title | Album details | POL | Sales | Certifications |
|---|---|---|---|---|
| On My Own | Released: 16 April 2007; Label: Kayax; Formats: CD, digital download | 6 | POL: 15,000+ | POL: Gold |
| Spider Web | Released: 16 May 2011; Label: Sony; Formats: CD, digital download | 14 | | |
| Blizna | Released: 18 March 2014; Label: Warner Music Poland; Formats: CD, digital download | 14 | | |
"—" denotes a recording that did not chart or was not released in that territory.

=== Singles ===
| Title | Year | Peak chart positions | | | Album |
| Title | Year | POL | GRE | RUS | Album |
|---|---|---|---|---|---|
| „Don't Hold Back” | 2013 | 44 | 38 | — | On My Own |
| „Keep It on the Low” (feat. Mika & Michał Urbaniak) | 2013 | 15 | — | — | On My Own |
| „Lovin' You” | 2014 | — | — | — | On My Own |
| „Kogo kocham” | 2014 | 57 | — | — | — |
| „Valentine” (feat. Wyclef Jean) | 2015 | — | — | — | — |
| „Maximum” | 2015 | — | — | — | — |
| „Spider Web” | 2015 | — | — | — | Spider Web |
| „Been a Fool” | 2016 | — | 11 | 253 | Spider Web |
| „Tu i teraz” (feat. Dawid Podsiadło) | 2016 | 47 | — | — | — |
| „Blizna” | 2017 | 39 | — | — | Blizna |
| „Oczy na zapałki” | 2017 | — | — | — | Blizna |
"—" denotes items which were not released in that country or failed to chart.

=== Music videos ===
| Title | Year | Directed | Album | Ref. |
|---|---|---|---|---|
| "Don't Hold Back" | 2007 | — | On My Own | |
| "Keep It on the Low" | 2007 | Jacek Kościuszko | On My Own | |
| "Kogo kocham" | 2008 | — | non-album single | |
| "Spider Web" | 2011 | — | Spider Web | |
| "Been A Fool" | 2011 | — | Spider Web | |
| "Tu i teraz" (with Dawid Podsiadło) | 2012 | FlashForwardProduction | non-album single | |
| "Blizna" | 2014 | — | Blizna | |
