= Kuba Wojewódzki =

Polish journalist

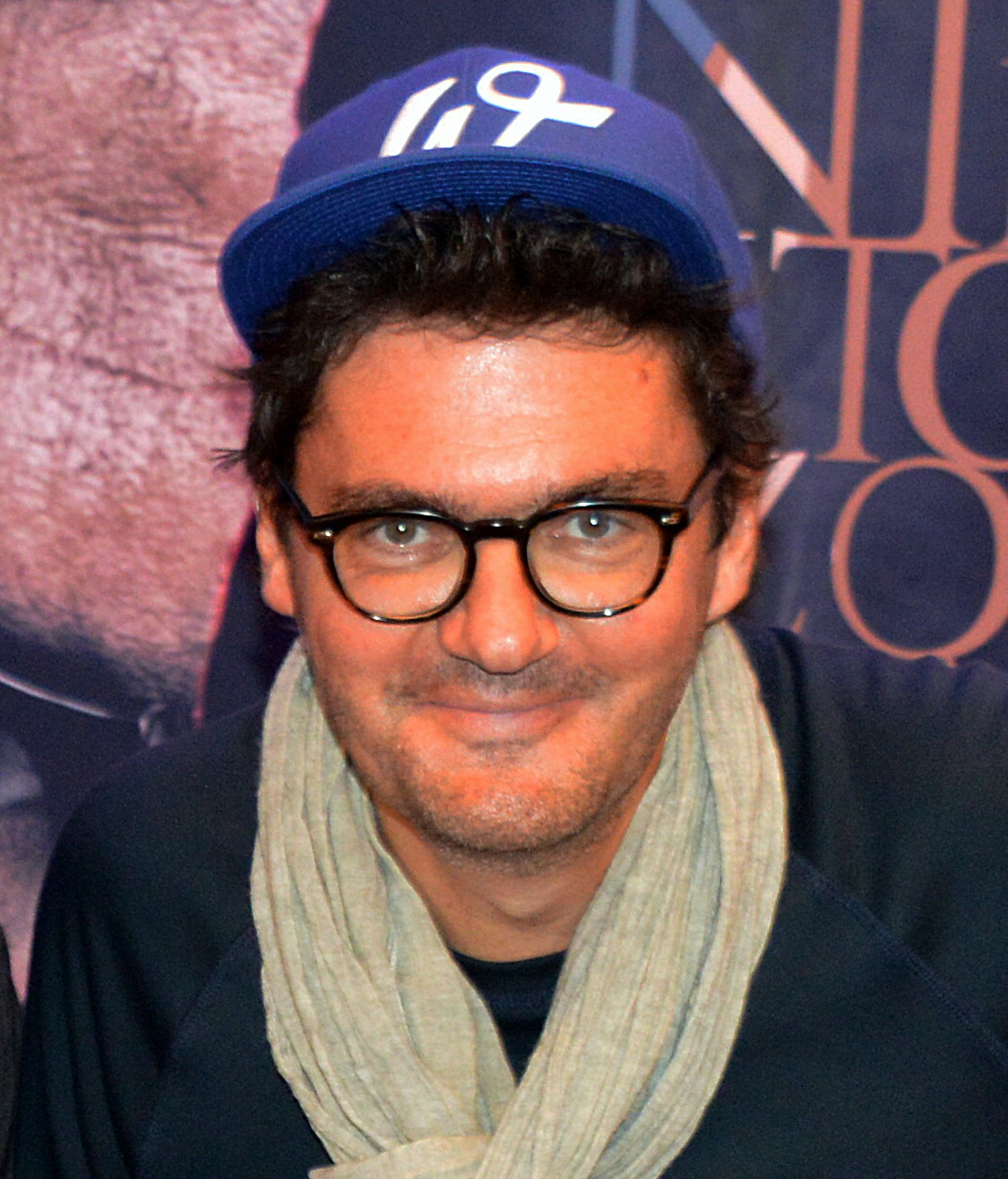
- Kuba Wojewódzki in 2018
- Born: Jakub Władysław Wojewódzki; 2 August 1963 (age 63); Koszalin, Poland

Comedy career
- Years active: 2002–present
- Medium: television, radio, press
- Genres: Social satire, talk show
- Website: kuba.tvn.pl

Jakub Władysław "Kuba" Wojewódzki (pronounced [ˈjakub vwaˈdɨswaf ˈkuba vɔjɛˈvut͡skʲi]; born 2 August 1963), is a Polish journalist, TV personality, drummer, and comedian.

== Career ==
Wojewódzki was a judge on the Polish Idol, in 2002 and 2005. He also was the Polish representative on the World Idol on 25 December 2003.

In the 1980s, he was a member of punk bands called System and New Dada. Currently, he is a drummer in the band called Klatu. Since 2002 2006 he has been working Kuba Wojewodzki Polsat October 4, 2002 June 18, 2006.

Since September 24, 2006, he has been working for TVN.

He has his own TV show called Kuba Wojewódzki and is a judge on Mam talent!, September 13, 2008 November 27, 2010 2008–2010 2017 Final 10 Edycja Mam Talent the Polish edition of Britain's got talent and since 2011–2014 also on X-Factor.

=== Controversies ===
He was criticized for being extremely harsh on X Factor contestants and for making racist comments. While translating for Nigerian-born auditionee John James Egwu who spoke limited Polish, he claimed that contestant had answered "I married a white woman and then ate her" when asked what he was doing in Poland, and mistranslated "I studied here" as "She was a bit gristly." Wojewódzki then encouraged the audience to laugh at the contestant.

In his talk show, he explores numerous controversial issues. On one of his shows (aired on 25 March 2008), a cartoonist Marek Raczkowski inserted the Polish flag into dog faeces, in the protest against littering public places and criticizing owners who do not clean after their pets. He tried to send a message that other nations are more responsible in that matter. The incident was widely discussed by the media. On his morning radio show for radio Eska Rock, in June 2011, he said that perhaps there should be "a national register of negroes" and stated that that day's show was sponsored by the Warsaw branch of the Ku Klux Klan. His comments were condemned by members of ethnic minorities in Poland. The radio station was fined 50,000 zlotys and Wojewódzki's comments were described in the report of the radio authorities (Krajowa Rada Radiofonii i Telewizji) as being "unambiguously racist" ("jednoznacznie rasistowskie").

In October, 2013, Wojewódzki claimed to be hurt by an unknown assaulter who burned his face and neck with acid. As revealed later by the police, the fluid was not acid, it was a non-corrosive substance.

Wojewódzki for several years acted as a testimonial for controversial alcohol businessman Janusz Palikot. In early 2024, he apologized for his former advocacy regarding crowdfunding and withdrew his support for Palikots enterprises, after the latter became in fact defunct because of indebtedness. Before, he had been feed together with Palikot for illicit alcohol advertisement in social media.

== TV Show ==
Years	TV Show	Series	Television
2002–2003, 2005	Idol	I-II, IV	Polsat
2003	World Idol	-	Polsat
2002–2006	Kuba Wojewódzki	I-II IVV	Polsat
2006–present	Kuba Wojewódzki	-	TVN
2007	Taniec z gwiazdami (Polish version Dancing with the stars)	'Best Of' episode	TVN
2008–2010	Mam talent!	I-III	TVN
2011–2014	X-Factor	I-IIII	TVN
2017	Mam talent!	IIIIIIIII-I	TVN
2022–2023	Mask Singer	I	TVN
