= Czesław Mozil =

Polish-Danish singer and musician (born 1979)

Czesław Śpiewa
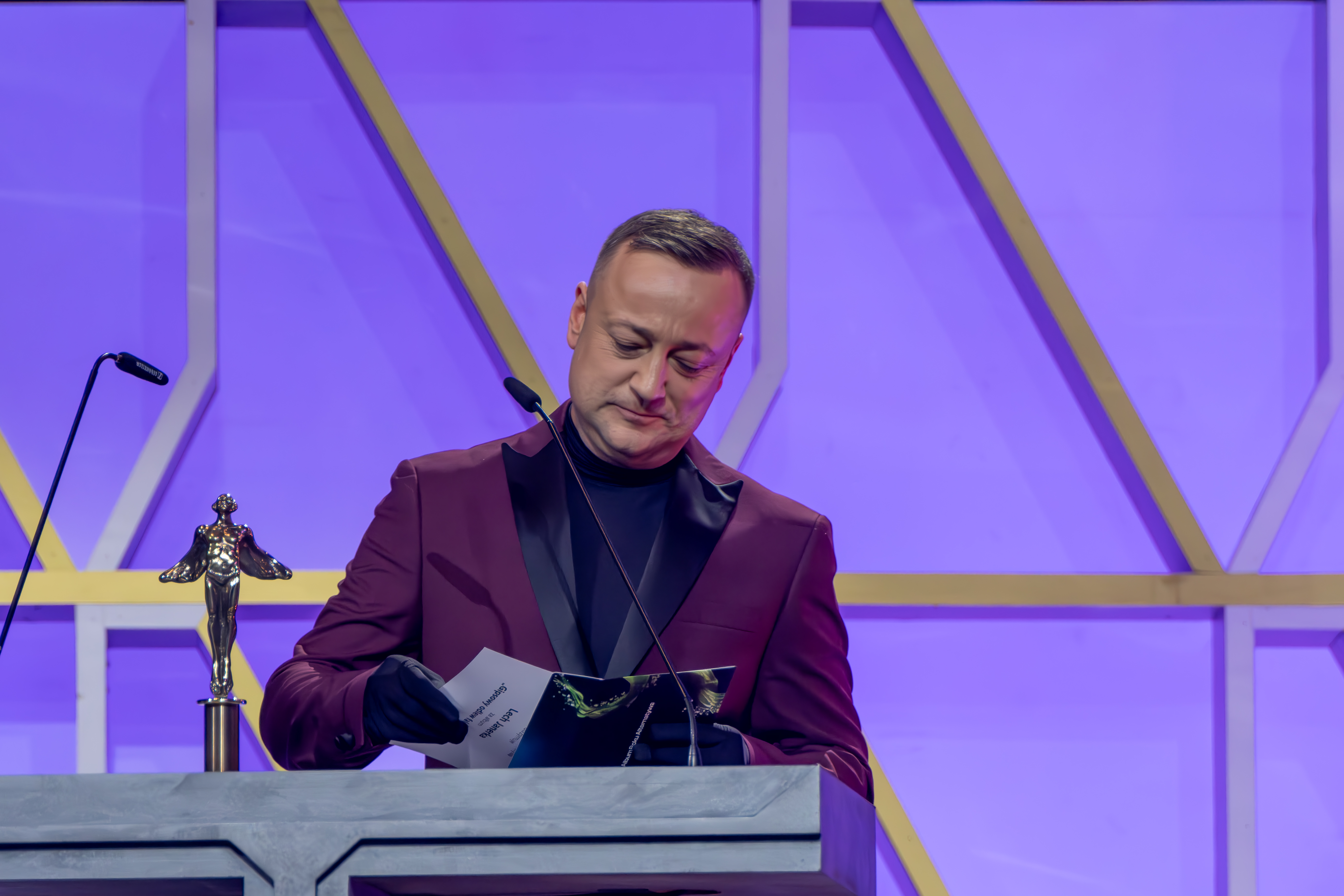
- Śpiewa in 2024

Background information
- Born: Czesław Stefan Mozil; April 12, 1979 (age 47); Zabrze, Poland
- Genre: Alternative
- Occupations: Singer, musician
- Instruments: Vocals, piano, melodica, accordion
- Years active: 2000 – present
- Label: Mystic Production
- Formerly of: Tesco Value, Hey

Czesław Stefan Mozil (born April 12, 1979), also known under the alias Czesław Śpiewa (lit. 'Czesław Sings'), is a Polish-Danish singer and musician (mostly using the accordion), and graduate of the Royal Danish Academy of Music.

== Life ==
Mozil moved to Denmark when he was 5, returning to Poland at the age of 28. He makes hard-to-classify music, with pieces of cabaret, rock, and even punk rock.

He also founded the Danish rock band Tesco Value (name of the group comes from his nickname, which was given to young Czesław Mozil on a vacation in England).

In 2007 he played live with the Polish band Hey during their MTV Unplugged show.

Czesław was a judge on the talent show X-Factor (Poland). He has expressed his support for LGBT rights.

His name was the correct answer to the winning final question on the Milionerzy quiz show in 2010, the Polish version of Who Wants to Be a Millionaire?

== Discography ==
=== Studio albums ===
Title	Album details	Peak chart positions	Sales	Certifications
Title	Album details	POL	Sales	Certifications
Debiut	Released: April 7, 2008; Label: Mystic Production; Formats: CD, digital download	1	POL: 60,000+	POL: 2xPlatinum
Pop	Released: April 12, 2010; Label: Mystic Production; Formats: CD, digital download	2	POL: 15,000+	POL: Gold
Czesław Śpiewa Miłosza	Released: November 7, 2011; Label: Mystic Production; Formats: CD, digital download	9		
Księga Emigrantów. Tom I	Released: October 6, 2014; Label: Mystic Production; Formats: CD, digital download	17		
"—" denotes a recording that did not chart or was not released in that territory.

=== Live albums ===
Title	Album details	Peak chart positions
Title	Album details	POL
Grać nie srać	Released: October 9, 2013; Label: Mystic Production; Formats: CD, digital download	17
"—" denotes a recording that did not chart or was not released in that territory.

=== Video albums ===
Title	Album details	Sales	Certifications
Solo Act	Released: May 9, 2011; Label: Mystic Production; Formats: DVD, Blu-ray	POL: 5,000+	POL: Gold

== Music videos ==
Year	Title	Director(s)
2008	"Mieszko I Dobrawa"	Mads Nygaard Hemmingsen, Joanna Zofia Bard Mikolajczyk
2008	"Maszynka do Świerkania"	Mads Nygaard Hemmingsen, Joanna Zofia Bard Mikolajczyk
2008	"Ucieczka Z Wesołego Miasteczka"	Monika Kuczyniecka
2010	"W Sam Raz"	Mads Nygaard Hemmingsen
2010	"Krucha Blondynka"	Mads Nygaard Hemmingsen
2012	"Pożegnanie Małego Wojownika"	Zuzanna Szyszak
