= Ostróda Reggae Festival =

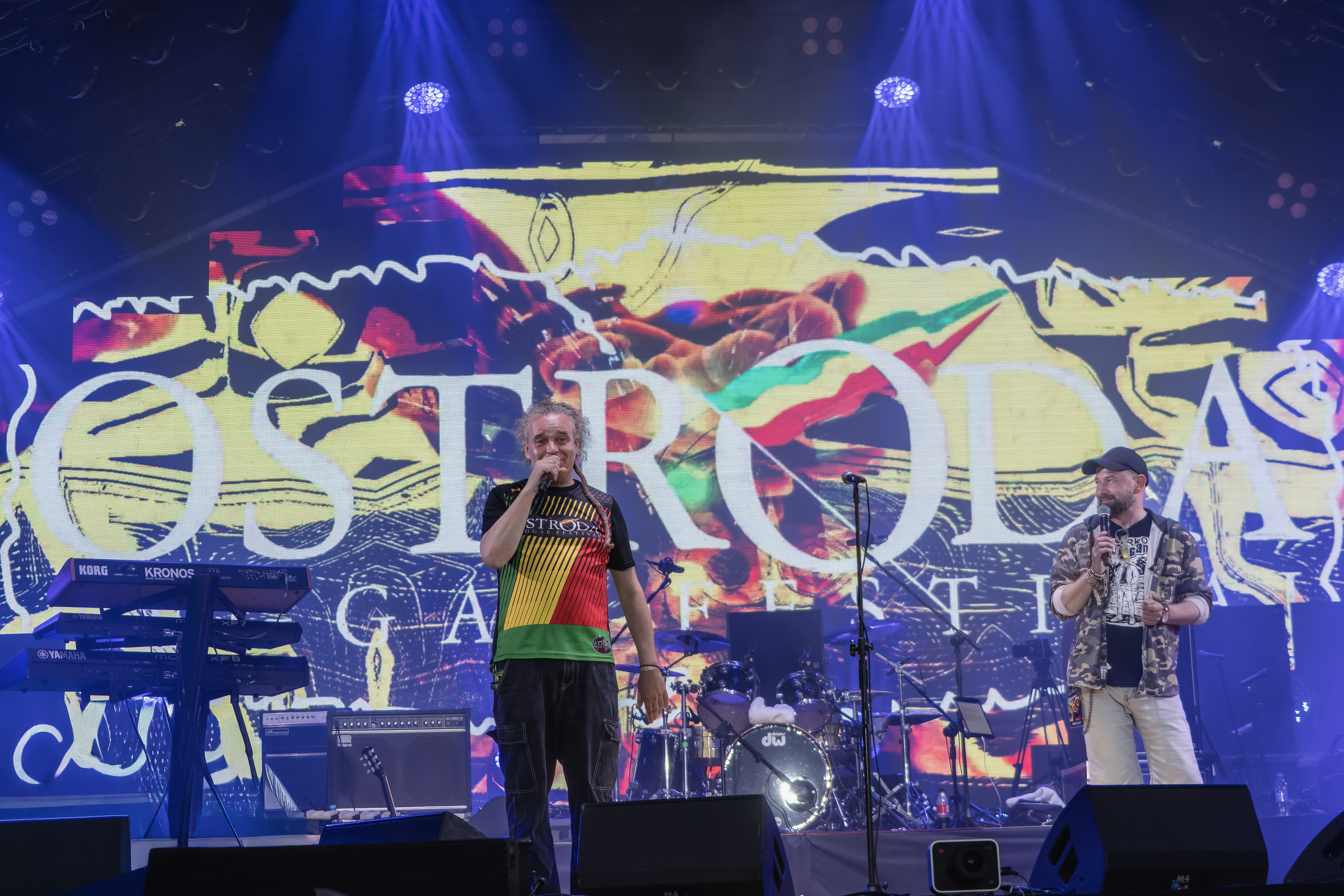
- Main stage of the festival in 2025
- Genre: Reggae
- Date: July
- Frequency: annual - every year
- Venue: Ostróda City Stadium, Amphitheatre in Ostróda
- Locations: Ostróda, Poland
- Years active: 2001–present
- Founder: Piotr Kolaj
- Organiser: Positive Music Promotion
- Website: www.ostrodareggae.com

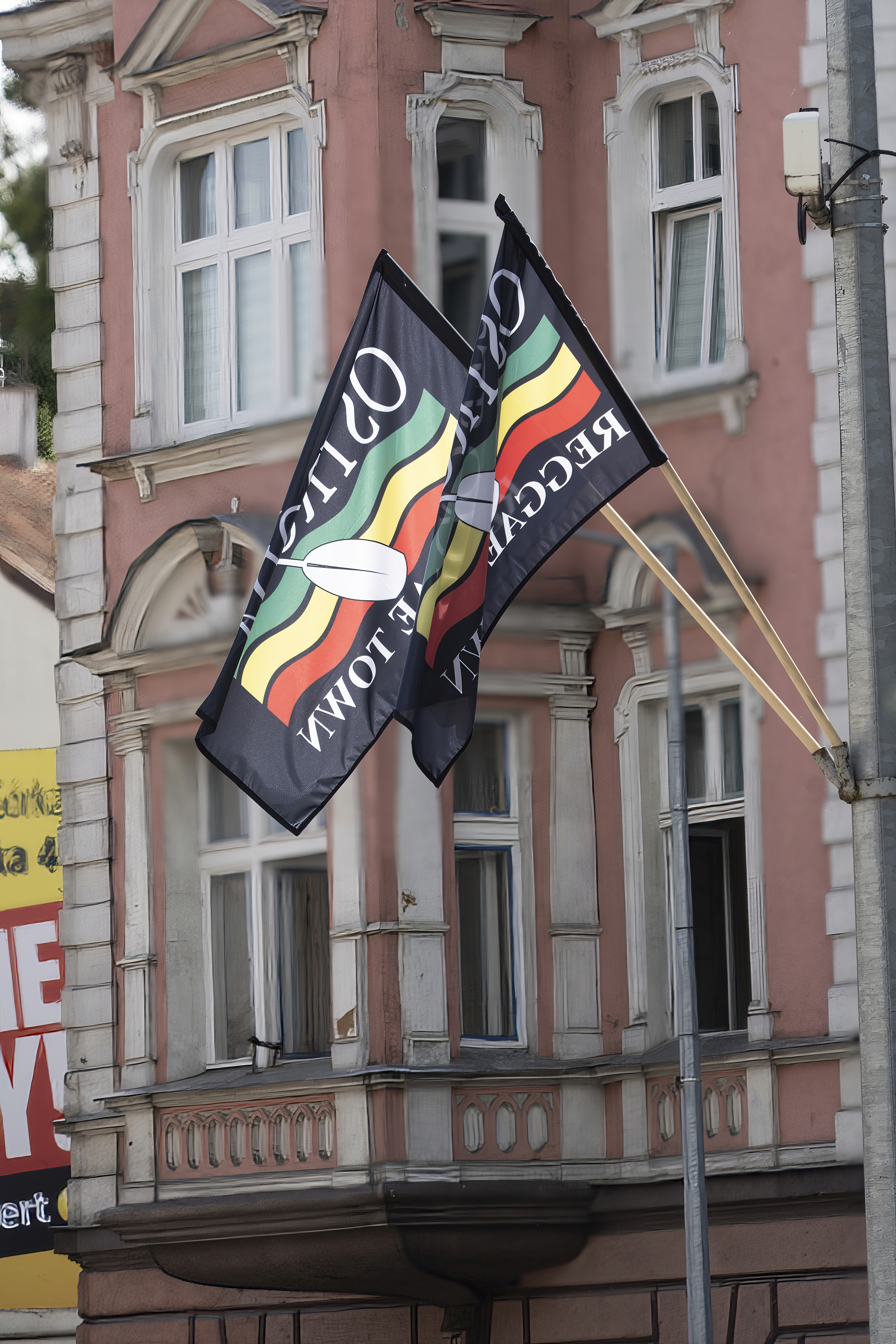
The Flag of Ostróda Reggae Festival

Ostróda Reggae Festival is the largest reggae music festival in Poland, held annually in the town of Ostróda since 2001.

== History ==
The roots of the festival go back to 1983, when employees of the then Municipal Cultural Centre in Ostróda organized a local music contest under the name "Ost-Rock". It featured young bands from Ostróda and surrounding areas as part of the National Youth Song Review. Annual editions were held until 1989 in various locations throughout the town. The most frequent winner was the local band Magister z Wyciętą Przysadką Mózgową. Other participants included Blues Children, Klaps, Policja w Krainie Czarów, Rzeka Czasu, Positive Vibration, Nasza Rozgłośnia, Napalm, and Naga Prawda.

In the 1990s, two attempts to revive the contest were made — in 1995 and 1996 — with the band Agonya winning both times.

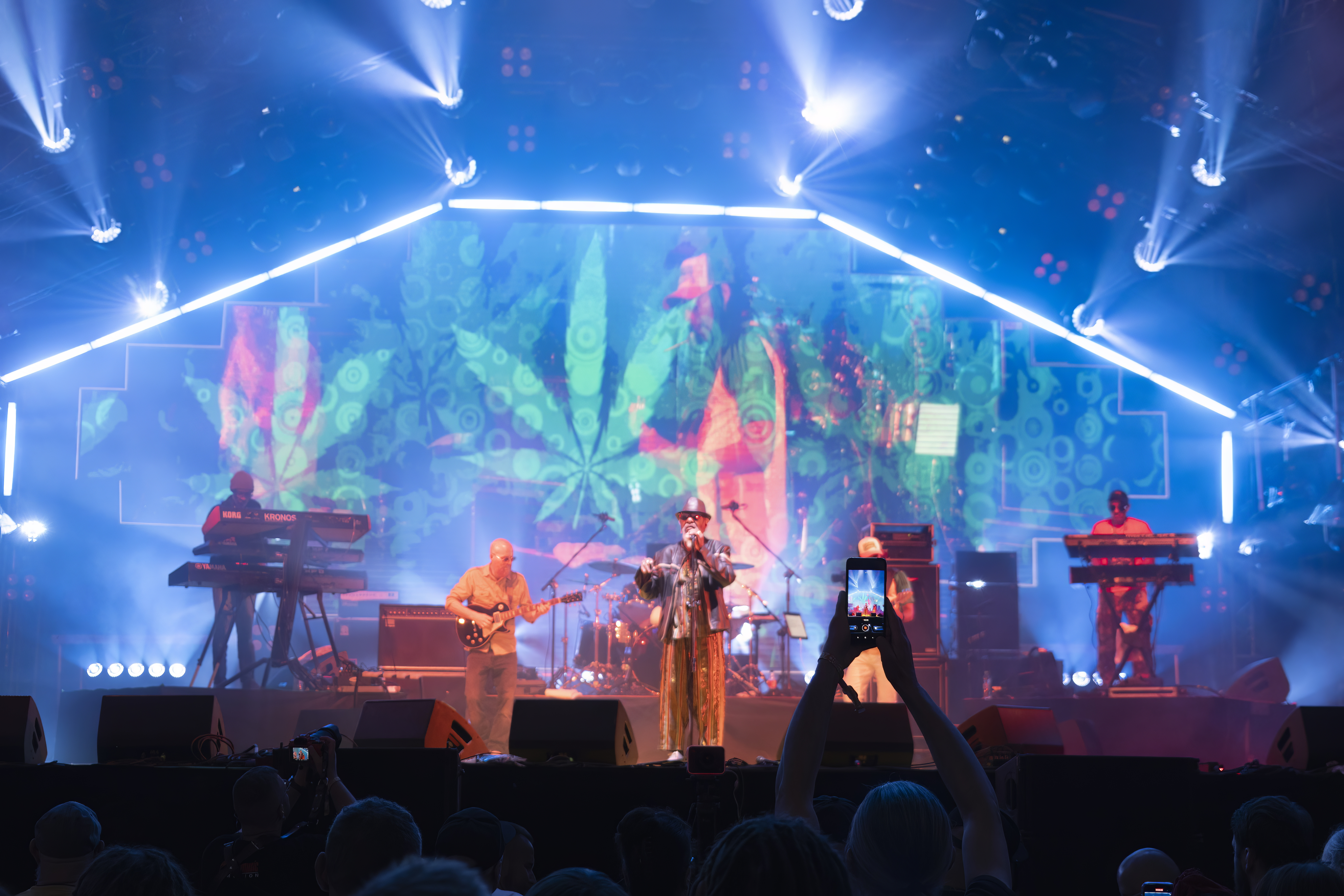
Ijahman Levi on 24th Ostróda Reggae Festival

The modern version of the festival was launched in 2001 through the efforts of Artur "Many" Munje, head of Ostróda's Promotion Office, and Piotr "Piter" Kolaj from the agency Positive Music Promotion. For the first three years, the event took place in the courtyard of the Teutonic Castle in Ostróda under the name "Ost-Rock-Reggae". In 2004, the festival moved to the "Białe Koszary" military complex and adopted the name Ostróda Reggae Festival.

The program traditionally includes a competition for young bands, with judges such as Włodzimierz Kleszcz, Sławomir Gołaszewski, Robert Brylewski, Mirosław "Maken" Dzięciołowski, Grzegorz Kasjaniuk, and Jarosław Hejenkowski.

From the fifth edition onward, the festival features three main stages: Red Stage, Green Stage, and Yellow SoundSystem Stage.

== Festival editions ==
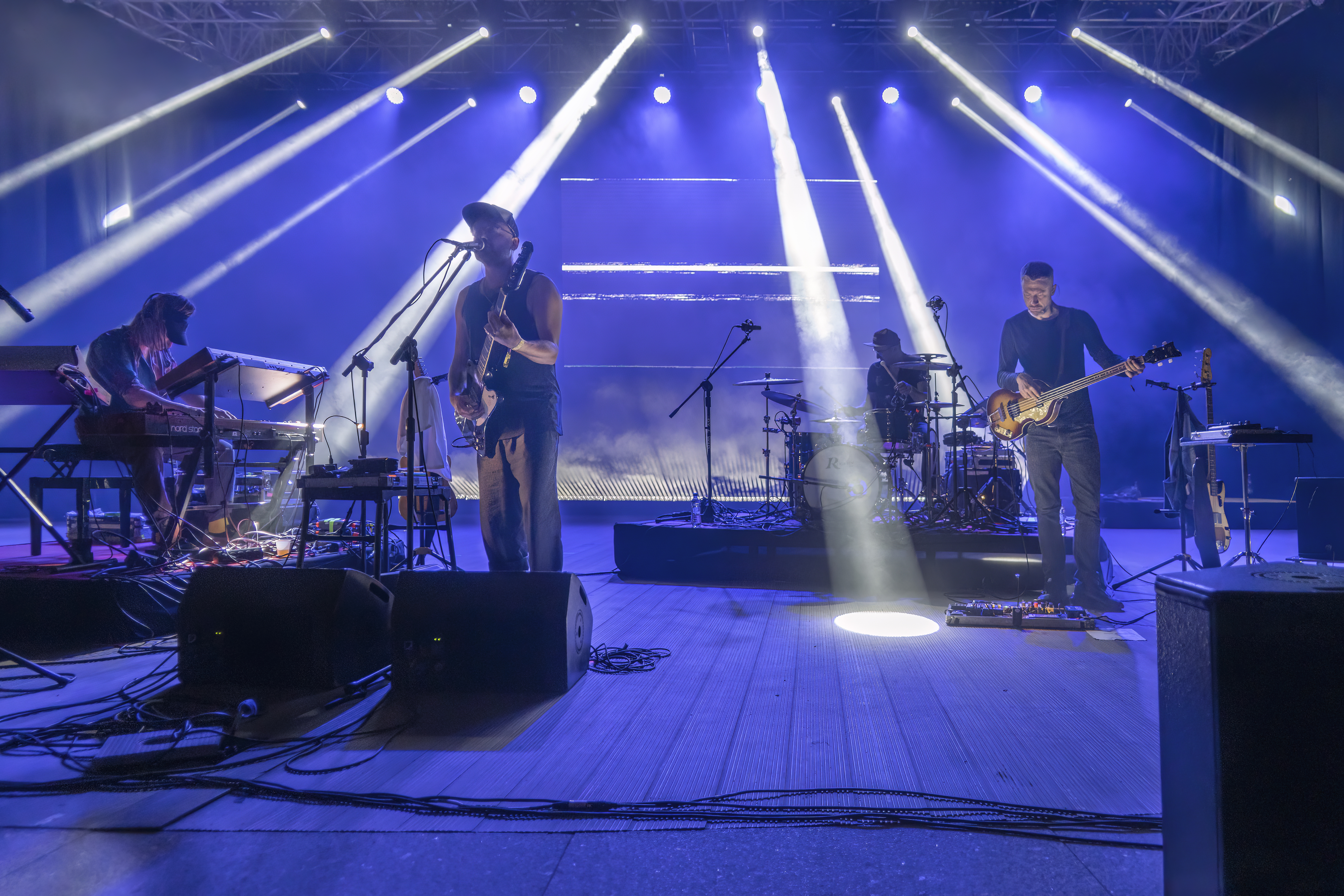
Concert in Amfiteatre

=== 2001 ===
The festival was held on 31 August – 1 September in the courtyard of the Teutonic Castle in Ostróda.

- Day one: Skauci (1st prize), Ikarion (2nd prize), Last Zgredas (audience award), Fari, Mandragora, The Arrow, Tuesday, ZakaZaka; guest performance by Bakshish.
- Day two: Agonya, Ikarion, Kobranocka, Last Zgredas, Pulsar, Shalalana, Skauci, Triquetra.

=== 2002 ===
Held on 31 August at the castle courtyard.

- Contest participants: Triquetra (1st prize), Ave Lion (2nd prize), Project Zion (audience award), Agonya, Happysad, Let’s Go, Popcore, Sezamkova, Taumaturgia, Tuesday. Guest performances by: Bakshish, Kevin Arnold, Paprika Korps, Pogodno, Tumbao.

=== 2003 ===
Held on 30 August at the castle courtyard.

- Pre-event concert "Small Ost-Rock Stage" at Club Paragraf with Agonya, Akcyza, Atencja, Bin-Equality, Happysad, Honduras, Johnny Tomala, Popcore, Pulsar, Tuesday, Wsio w Pariadku.
- Contest participants: Le Illjah (reggae category winner), Oranżada (rock category winner), Paraliż Band (audience award), Cała Góra Barwinków, Chant, Helicobacter, Inside The Outside, Nowa Kultura.
- Guest performances: Habakuk, Indios Bravos, Joint Venture Soundsystem, Tumbao, Polemic (Slovakia).
- Due to disturbances near the venue, the concert was interrupted around midnight and bands Duberman, Paprika Korps, Bakshish did not perform. A make-up event "After Ostrock Reggae Festival" was held on 25 November.

=== 2004 ===
Held on 13–15 August at the "Białe Koszary" military complex.

- Contest participants: Ave Lion (1st prize), Dubska (best rhythm section), Kultura De Natura (best vocalist – Rasm Al-Mashan), Africonnect, Jordan, Nowa Kultura.
- Main stage: Bakshish, Duberman, Gedeon Jerubbaal, Habakuk, Indios Bravos, Inity Dub Mission, Le Illjah, Maleo Reggae Rockers, Paprika Korps, Paraliż Band, Positive, Radikal Dub Kolektiv, Sidney Polak, Vavamuffin, WWS All Sunrises Soundsystem, Estrepito Banditos (Germany), Love Grocer (UK), Daddy Teacha & Ramshaka (UK).
- Sound system stage: Kuri Selecta, El Mariachi & Ortopheads, Joint Me Squad, Positive Ferment, Singledread Soundsystem, Love Sen-C Music, Gwoździu Selecta, Trzy Kolory Reggae, Kadubra Dynamite Soundsystem, Zjednoczenie Soundsystem, DJ Feel-X, Olsztyn Reggae Amatorz, Obora Rekords, Bass Medium Trinity, Tisztelet Soundsystem, JSM Rootskontrolla, Dreadzone Soundsystem (UK).

=== 2005 ===
Held on 12–14 August at the barracks.

- Contest on Green Stage: Tabu (1st prize), Geto Blasta (best vocalist – Junior Stress), Bambi, Devoted & Rudd Sound, Kometa Marleja, Power of Trinity.
- Red Stage: Bakshish, Daab, Duberman, Habakuk, Immanuel, Indios Bravos, Maleo Reggae Rockers, Vavamuffin, Brain Damage (France), High Tone (France), Manipulators (France), Twinkle Brothers (Jamaica), Nucleus Roots (UK), Over Proof Soundsystem (UK).
- Green Stage: Africonnect, Cała Góra Barwinków, Dubska, Etna Kontrabande, Fari, Faya, Lion Vibrations, Natanael, Negril, Pauza, Positive, Project Zion, Rebellion, Stage of Unity, Yere Yere Li, Yallency Brown (Germany).
- Yellow SoundSystem: Olsztyn Reggae Amatorz, Gwoździu Selecta, Singledread Soundsystem, Love Sen-C Music, Abselektor, Rub Pulse, Obora Rekords, Tisztelet Soundsystem, JSM Rootskontrolla, Zjednoczenie Soundsystem, DJ Feel-X, Yasman & Tony Junior B.I.G. (Cuba).
- Tent-Field Stage: a fourth sound system stage hosted by Alik Dziki and DJ Leo as "Rootsmanufaktura: Jamaican Mobile Open Air Soundsystem".

=== 2006 ===
Held on 18–20 August at the barracks. The headline act was Culture with lead vocalist Hill Junior, son of the late Joseph Hill, who passed away two days before the concert.

- Red Stage: Bakshish, Duberman, Habakuk & Muniek Staszczyk, Jafia Namuel, Lion Vibrations & Jerzy "Mercedes" Mercik, Magnetosfera (members of Izrael), Maleo Reggae Rockers, Natural Dread Killaz, Paraliż Band, Polish Fire, Tumbao, Vavamuffin, WWS All Sunrises Soundsystem, Pionear (Germany), Yellow Umbrella (Germany), Tony Junior B.I.G. (Cuba), Steel Pulse (UK), Jah Man Soul & P.A.C.E. (Zimbabwe).
- Green Stage: Druga Strona Lustra, Dusza i Mercedes, Dzioło, Good Religion, Jordan & Kapela Kociewska, Dubska, Managga, Tabu, United Flavour (Czech Republic), Jah Tiger (Jamaica), Natty Dreadlocks (UK).
- Yellow SoundSystem Stage: Singledread Soundsystem, EastWest Rockers, Love Sen-C Music, Zjednoczenie Soundsystem, Joint Venture Soundsystem, Obora Rekords, Tisztelet Soundsystem, Rainbow Hi-Fi, Rub Pulse, Yasman & Tony Junior B.I.G. & Omniris Toledo (Cuba), Big Family & Roots Survival (France), Abassi All Stars (UK), DJ Ridm (UK).
- Contest participants: Majestic (1st prize), Fire Flex Crew, Make Progress, Naaman, Silesian Sound.

=== 2007 ===
Held on 16–19 August, the first edition to span four days. Bakshish celebrated their 25th anniversary.

- Red Stage: Ares & The Tribe, Bakshish, Chant, Duberman, Dubska with Gera Morales (of Jah Division), Etna Kontrabande, Gedeon Jerubbaal, Indios Bravos, Inity Dub Mission, Konopians, Maleo Reggae Rockers, Natural Dread Killaz & Riddim Banditz, Natural Mystic, Paprika Korps, Tabu, The Relievers, Vavamuffin, WWS All Sunrises Soundsystem, Dub Incorporation (France), Mood Rakers (Spain), Yellowman (Jamaica), Soul Fire (Greece), Misty in Roots (UK), Pama International (UK).
- Green Stage: Pandadread, Jah Dollz, Rainbow Hi-Fi, Abselektor, Dr Meegdal, Babel Label, Ras Bass, 27 Pablo, Obora Rekords, Selecta, Kosmos Mega, Echo TM, Duby Smalone, Joint Venture, Love Sen-C Music, Zjednoczenie, EastWest Rockers, Prince Kur & Santiago Loco (Ireland), Lone Ranger (Jamaica), Impacto (Cuba), Hornsman Coyote (Serbia), Brother Culture (UK), DJ Ridm (UK).
- Yellow SoundSystem Stage: Rub Pulse, Ras Bass, Obora Rekords, Singledread, Kadubra Dynamite, Jam Vibez, Ushat, Abselektor, Soul Operators.
- Contest: Raggafaya (1st prize), Lars (2nd prize), Industrial Forest, Pajujo, Świadomość.

=== 2008 ===
Held on 14–17 August at the barracks. Daab celebrated 25 years, Pablo 27 marked 10 years of career.

- Red Stage: Bakshish, Daab, Gedeon Jerubbaal, Izrael, Jafia Namuel, Lion Vibrations, Natanael, Nefre, Paraliż Band, Sedativa, Vavamuffin, United Flavour (Czech Republic), Big Family (France), Danakil (France), No More Babylon (France), Gorgon Massive (Netherlands), Alborosie & Shang Yeng Clan (Jamaica), Earl 16 & U-Brown (Jamaica), Ijahman Levi (Jamaica), Max Romeo (Jamaica), Omar Perry & Homegrown Band (Jamaica), Jahcoustix & Dubios Neighbourhood (Germany), Terrakota (Portugal), Jah Division (Russia), Full Focus Productions (Sweden), General Levy (UK), Franziska (Italy).
- Green SoundSystem Stage: Jam Vibez, Soundz of Freedom, EastWest Rockers, Singledread, Love Sen-C Music, Echo TM, Respecta Kru & Cheeba, DJ Beezee, DJ Dia, R33IC4SH & Junior Stress, Partizans Kru, DJ Playaman, T. Duby, Pankracy, 27 Pablo, Tisztelet, Ras Bass, Zjednoczenie, DJ Leo, Obora, Bass Medium Trinity, Babel Label, DJ Babylon Rocker & Missy M (Czech Rep.), Nekswan (France), Irieland (Germany), Kingstone, Pow Pow (Germany), Tricky D (Germany), Royal Crown (Canada), Lexo (Portugal), Ras Cricket & Diego Jah & E.C.U. (Sweden), One Love (Italy).
- Yellow SoundSystem Stage: filled gaps between concerts.
- Contest: Fire In The Hole (1st prize), Alicetea (special prize – vocalist Alicja), Bez Jahzgh, Erijef Massiv, R.A.G.A. Squad.

=== 2009 ===
Held on 14–16 August at the barracks.

- Contest: Raggamoova (1st prize), Enchantia (special award from Jamaican consul – singer Sara Brylewska), Creska, Czerniejewska, Sensithief.
- Red Stage: Babylon Raus, Jamal, Junior Stress, Maleo Reggae Rockers, Marika & Ruff Radics, Ragana, Rastasize, Rebellion, Tabu, Vavamuffin, Jah Live (Brazil), Kana (France), Tiken Jah Fakoly (France), Dubtonic Kru (Jamaica), Tosh Meets Marley (Jamaica), Rootz Underground (Jamaica), Ras Paddy & The Rockas (Nigeria), Junior Tschaka (Switzerland), Rebel Control (UK), Xova (UK), Yaz Alexander (UK).
- Green SoundSystem Stage: Ready For War, Jam Vibez, Soundz of Freedom, Singledread, Rah Rah Crew, DJ Set, Love Sen-C Music, Earl Jacob, MC Talib, Bigger Boss, Ras Bass, Roots Revival, Bob One, Joint Venture, Digitaldubs (Brazil), The Dynamics (France), Digital Roots Movement (Ireland), Mass Cypher (Jamaica), Mystic MC (Jamaica), Ranking Joe (Jamaica), Dubmatix (Canada), Collynization (Germany), Supersonic (Germany), SWS (Germany), City Lock (Germany), Pow Pow (Germany), Irieland (Germany), Hornsman Coyote (Serbia), Brother Culture (UK), Irration Steppas (UK), Over Proof Soundsystem (UK).
- Yellow SoundSystem Stage: filled breaks between concerts.

=== 2010 ===
Held on 12–15 August — the 10th anniversary edition. The opening contest for young bands was held on the pier of Lake Drwęckie. Participants: PaRasSol (1st prize), Far Away, Natural Mystic, Paihivo, Sharpi. Guests: Tabu, Pajujo. Habakuk and Alians celebrated 20 years.

- Red Stage: Cała Góra Barwinków, Dubska, EastWest Rockers, Habakuk, Junior Stress & Sun El Band, Konopians, Lion Vibrations, Paprika Korps, Paraliż Band, PaRasSol, Ragana, Ras Luta, Skankan, Vavamuffin, Dub Incorporation (France), No More Babylon (France), Bushman (Jamaica), Chezidek (Jamaica), Everton Blender (Jamaica), Jah Mason (Jamaica), Cornerstone Roots (New Zealand), Hornsman Coyote (Serbia), Soldiers of Jah Army (USA), The Aggrolites (USA), Zion Train (UK).
- Green SoundSystem Stage: Ras Bass, Roots Defender & Natty B., Real Cool, Kosmos Mega, Zjednoczenie, KaCeZet & Dreadsquad, Singledread, Kuba 1200, Love Sen-C Music, Rudebwoy Salute, Ready For War, Tisztelet, Splendid, Dancehall Masak-Rah, Kadubra Dynamite, Jabbadub, Dubbist, The Lordz, Radikal Guru, Joint Venture, Roots Revival, Digitaldubs (Brazil), Big Family (France), King Kalabash & Baron Black (France), Ras Zacharri (Jamaica), SWS (Germany), Sentinel (Germany), Pow Pow (Germany), Hornsman Coyote (Serbia), UK Roots Connection, The Scientist Soundsystem & 2 Kings & Prince Jamo (UK), YT (UK), Earl 16 (UK), Don Letts (UK), Mungos Hi-Fi & Soom-T & Kenny Knots (UK).
- Yellow Stage: operated mainly during breaks.

=== 2011 ===
Held on 11–14 August at the barracks. The event opened with a young bands' contest on the pier at Lake Drwęckie. Participants: Make Progress (1st prize), Bethel, Kuki Pau, Sound’s Good, Zebra. Final concert by Jafia Namuel, promoting their album One Love Train. A Reggae University operated during the festival.

- Red Stage: Bakshish, Biafro, Cała Góra Barwinków, Duberman, Dubska, Etna Kontrabande, Farben Lehre, Izrael, Konopians, Make Progress, Natural Mystic Akustycznie, Paraliż Band, Poparzeni Kawą Trzy, Star Guard Muffin, Tabu, Vavamuffin, Dub Akom Band (France), Dubtonic Kru (Jamaica), Lutan Fyah (Jamaica), Mr. Vegas (Jamaica), Perfect Giddimani (Jamaica), Protoje (Jamaica), Ranking Joe (Jamaica), Sly & Robbie & Junior Reid, Stephen Marley, Katchafire (New Zealand), The Wisdom Band (UK).
- Green Stage: Bas Tajpan, Bob One, Dancehall Masak-Rah, Jahdas, KaCeZet & Dreadsquad, Love Sen-C Music, Radikal Guru, Revolda Soundsystem, Roots Defender & Natty B., Sensithief, Singledread, SmokeDaCrackOff, Splendid, The Lordz, Zjednoczenie, King Kalabash (France), Herbalize It (Netherlands), Leftside (Jamaica), Upliftment & Dr. Ring Ding (Germany), Bush Chemists & King General (UK), Jah Free (UK), Mad Professor (UK), Reality Souljahs (UK), Vibronics (UK).
- Yellow Stage: hosted by Rise Up! Soundsystem from Częstochowa, served as break filler and featured spontaneous after-parties with festival artists.

=== 2012 ===
Held on 9–12 August at "Białe Koszary". Hosted Reggae University and Polish celebrations of Jamaica's 50th independence anniversary. Guests included Jamaican Ambassador to Germany Joy Wheeler, Honorary Consul Maria Dembowska, and Nicole Haughton (Jamaica Tourist Board). A Jamaica knowledge contest awarded two airline tickets to Jamaica.

- Red Stage: Tanya Stephens (Jamaica), Dreadzone (UK), Dactah Chando (Spain/Germany), Danakil (France), Anthony B (Jamaica), 1 Stop-Experience (UK), Bakshish, Ring Ding (Germany), Dub Syndicate (Jamaica), Adrian Sherwood (UK), EastWest Rockers, Fat Freddy’s Drop (New Zealand), Laid Blak (UK), Morgan Heritage (Jamaica/USA), Paprika Korps, Rod Taylor (Jamaica), Raggafaya, Rootz Underground (Jamaica), Tabu, Vavamuffin, The Bartenders, R.U.T.A., Junior Stress & Sun El Band, Bednarek, Habakuk & Kalokagathos, Jafia Namuel, Maleo Reggae Rockers.
- Green Stage: Aba Shanti-I (UK), Channel One Sound System (UK), Prince Fatty Sound System & Horseman & Hollie Cook, Illbilly Hitec & Longfingah, Radikal Guru & Cian Finn, Baby Cham, RDX, Solo Banton, Cali P, Adrian Sherwood (UK), Dancehall Masak-Rah, Love Sen-C Music, Roots Revival, Peter Metro, Bas Tajpan, Feel-X & Gutek, Joint Venture Sound System, Jacek Szafir.

=== 2013 ===
Held on 9–11 August at the "Czerwone Koszary". Featured the Reggae University and "Czwórka Reggae Contest" (won by Big Up!).

- Red Stage: Root Wise, CT-Tones, Junior Stress, Duberman, Ras Luta, Jamaram (Germany), Vavamuffin, Dub Pistols (UK), Luciano (Jamaica), Bednarek, Big Up!, Bongostan, Naaman, The Stylacja, Bubble Chamber, Skaos (Germany), Jamal, Gentleman's Dub Club (UK), Busy Signal (Jamaica), U-Roy (Jamaica), GrubSon, Gradu Minimo, Jahvigation, Zebra, Tallib & Sztoss, Tabu, Blue King Brown (Austria), Dubtonic Kru (Jamaica), Groundation (USA), Don Carlos (Jamaica), Paraliż Band.
- Green Stage: D-One & Mc Boone Chatta (Trinidad/Germany), Dancehall Masak-Rah, Pow-Pow (Germany), Reggae Rajahs (India), Bob One & Bas Tajpan, Dreadsquad & El Fata, Kacezet, Kasia Malenda (Poland/UK), Dubmatix (Canada), Radikal Guru & Cian Finn (Poland/Ireland), Iration Steppas (UK).
- Yellow Stage: served as break filler between main stage concerts.

=== 2014 ===
Held on 14–17 August at the "Czerwone Koszary". The Reggae University returned, and the "Czwórka Reggae Contest" was won by SielSKA.

- Red Stage: Dub Inc. (France), The Skatalites (Jamaica), Zion Train (UK/Jamaica), Pura Vida (Belgium), Chronixx & Zincfence Redemption (Jamaica), Damian Syjonfam & D-Roots Brothers, Bakshish, Cała Góra Barwinków, Vavamuffin, Congo Ashanti Roy (Jamaica), Earl Jacob & Zbóje, Ras Luta, Bethel, Kacezet & Fundamenty, Dubska, Meta & The Cornerstone (Senegal, Japan, Israel, Jamaica, USA), Rootz Underground, Raggafaya, Mesajah, Easy Star All-Stars (USA), Maleo Reggae Rockers, Jafia Namuel (20th anniversary), Bednarek, Big Up, Tabu.
- Green Stage: Vibronics (UK), Black Chiney (USA), Joint Venture, Love Sen-C Music, Dancehall Masak-Rah, Splendid Sound, Silly Walks Discotheque & RC (Germany/Jamaica), Mayd Hubb meets Joe Pilgrim (France), Trojan Sound System (UK).
- Red Bull Tour Bus Stage: Bass Invaders, Dubłajzer, KGS & Fritz, Liper, K-Jah, Calu, MadMajk, Wersman, David D’Light, Real Cool Sound, Skadyktator, Earl Jacob, Fire Corner Crew.
- Yellow Stage: ambient and spiritual performances, including sound baths with gongs and bowls (Robert Kiedrzyński), Rise Up! Sound System, Roots Trippin, Bdg Dub, Raa Step, Natural Unite, Samer, All On Sound, Ictus Sound, Roots Melody, Bass Aid, Good Vibes Familia, Gene Tella Tribe, SięBujajTu, Jah Love.

=== 2015 ===
Held on 6–9 August at the "Czerwone Koszary", the 15th anniversary edition. Included Reggae University and the international World Reggae Contest with five finalists: Nova Raiz (Brazil), Dubska (Poland), Chainska Brassika (UK), Shanty (UK), The Banyans (France).

- Red Stage: Sielska, November Project, The Relievers, Fyah Keepers (UK/Poland/Jamaica), Izrael performs "Kultura", Richie Campbell (Portugal), Black Roots (UK), Tabu, Raging Fyah (Jamaica), Gentleman & The Evolution (Germany), Damian Syjonfam, Roots Rockets, Chonabibe, Bob One & Bas Tajpan, Tumbao, Bednarek, Protoje (Jamaica), Capleton (Jamaica), Duberman.
- Green Stage: K-Jah Sound Showcase, K.W.S.S.C. & Ragga Killa Sound (Russia), Dub Terminator (New Zealand), Dreadsquad & Lady Chann & Mic Liper (Poland/UK), Sensithief, Zjednoczenie Sound System, Rory Stone Love (Jamaica), Dancehall Masak-Rah, Arubdub (Poland/Ireland), Dub Dynasty & Cian Finn (UK/Ireland), O.B.F. & Shanti D (France), Radikal Guru & Dubdadda & Cian Finn (Poland/UK/Ireland).

=== 2018 ===
Held 5–8 July 2018.

- Red Stage: Gentleman (Germany), Dub Inc (France), Twinkle Brothers & Trebunie‑Tutki (Jamaica/Poland), Jesse Royal (Jamaica), Christopher Martin & JamDonz Band (Jamaica) ...
- Green Stage: Bakshish Soundsystem, Pozyton Sound & Yardee Crew, Jabbadub.
- Yellow Stage: Bass AID, Skank Ranger, Lady Asha.

=== 2019 ===
Held 11–14 July 2019.

- Red Stage / Amphitheatre (main): Marcus Gad, Damian SyjonFam, Bakshish, Johny Rockers, Etna Kontrabande, Dubska, Raggattack, Sidney Polak, U Brown & Ras Bass, Dreadsquad & Lasai, Unstoppable Fyah & Dotta Coppa, Jahneration, Queen Ifrica, King Jammy, Agent Sasco, The Congos feat. Pura Vida, Gentleman’s Dub Club, Samory I, Alpha Steppa & Nai‑Jah.
- Green Stage / DJ & Sound Systems: Jah Love Soundsystem, Dancehall Masak‑Rah, Freedomsound feat. Cheeba & Duże PE, Splendid Sound, Vavamuffin, Tamika & K‑Jah Sound, Duberman feat. Hornsman Coyote, Ayarise, Skank Ranger All‑Stars, Mack, Pandadread, Radikal Guru & Baptiste, Oku Onuora, L’Entourloop ft. Troy Berkley & N’Zeng.

=== 2020 ===
Scheduled for 9–12 July 2020 but postponed due to the COVID-19 pandemic.

=== 2021 ===
Held 8–11 July 2021 as the postponed 20th edition.

- Red Stage: Reggae Edukacja (DJ Maken), Johny Rockers, Dubska, Gutek, Bakshish, Vavamuffin, The Beat Rootz, Yellow Umbrella, Shashamane, Brinsley Forde Aswad Experience, Tabu, Czwórka Reggae Contest (Barwy, Myasta, Boleo & Follow the Riddim), Paprika Korps, Habakuk, Mesajah & I‑Grades, Jah Love Soundsystem, Skank Ranger & MC Polishman, Violinbwoy, Sensithief.
- Green Stage / Other: Jah Love Soundsystem, Sensithief, Splendid Sound, Skank Ranger & MC Polishman, Violinbwoy, Yellow Umbrella, Shashamane, Tabu, The Beat Rootz, I‑Grades, Mesajah, Paprika Korps, Dreadsquad.

=== 2022 ===
Held 8–11 July 2022.

- Notable acts: Lila Iké, Julian Marley, Dub FX, Max Romeo & Xana Romeo, Vavamuffin, Tabu, Gutek, Skankan, Boleo & Follow the Riddim.

=== 2023 ===
Held 6–9 July 2023 at the Sports & Recreation Complex in Ostróda.

- Red Stage: Jahneration, Kabaka Pyramid, Nattali Rize, Dreadzone, Zion Train, Damian SyjonFam, Shashamane, Etna Kontrabande, Masala Soundsystem, Surtarang, Tabu, Paraliż Band, The Djangos, Immanuel, Rebel Idrens, Voo Voo, Dubska, The Vyo.
- Green Stage: Dasha Fyah, Singledread feat. Deadly Hunta, Pitch Black, Congo Natty feat. Blackout JA, Fatty Fatty, Dancehall Masak‑Rah, Irie Ites feat. Chezidek, I‑Grade Dub, Harper, Pozyton Sound, Demkaz.
- Yellow Stage: Bass Invaders, King Dubear aka Roots Revival Riddim Force, Jah Love Crew, Violinbwoy, Roots Trippin Sound System, Jahdyga, MicLiper, Mack, Bouquet, Fifi, Tune Fi Tune.

=== 2024 ===
Held 24–27 July 2024.

- Red Stage: Rootz Underground, The Cimarons, David Cairol, Dawid Porta & Jafia (30‑Years), Rebellion, Habakuk, Tomek Lipiński (45‑Years), Damian SyjonFam, Groundation, Micah Shemaiah & the Dreadites, Mesajah (20‑Years), Dubioza Kolektiv, Tabu, Vavamuffin, The Beat Rootz, Rootstone, Bethel, Jamajki, Dubska (Tribute to R.A.P.).
- Green Stage: K‑Jah Sound feat. Omar Perry, Singledread feat. Baron Black, Dancehall Masak‑Rah feat. Marika, Ras Luta, Cheeba, Barwy, Obeah, Radikal Guru feat. Baptiste, Adam Prescott feat. Donovan Kingjay, Manudigital feat. Dapatch MC, Bas Tajpan.

=== 2025 ===
Held 24–27 July 2025 at the Ostróda City Stadium and Amphitheatre. During the 24th edition, festival founder and director Piotr Kolaj was awarded the title of Honorary Citizen of the Town of Ostróda.

- Red Stage: Dub Inc, The Selecter, Mortimer, Inna De Yard, Ijahman Levi, Marcus Gad, The Sunvizors, Tabu, Christos DC & The Ligerians, Vavamuffin, Cała Góra Barwinków, Konopians, Skankan, Maleo 40Years, Spięty, Bakshish, Rogal Salut Band, Vibes And Power, Boleo & Follow the Riddim.
- Green Stage: O.B.F feat. Charlie P, Serial Killaz & Navigator, Roberto Sanchez Live Dub Mix, Omega Nebula, Dancehall Masak‑Rah & Junior Stress, United Flavour Soundsystem & UCEE, Zjednoczenie SoundSystem, Roots Revival Sound, Splendid Sound, Kosmos Mega Sound System 30Years, Jabbadub, Positive Thursdays in Dub.
- Yellow Stage: 27Pablo, Pandadread Sound System, Dub‑A‑Ratz, Roots Trippin Sound System, Wise Dub, Conscious Riddim Sound System, Lama Sound System, KoniK/DubHouse, Shivers Shashamane, Fifti meets Bouquet, OneLove Sound System, Moonje/Wiktor BSK.
- Molo Stage (DJ stage): Roots Trippin & Bass Invaders, Ciocia Olson, Mic Liper, Hah Love Crew, Fifti, Fifo Samaritan, Jammy Eye & Eye Sound System, Dr McGree & Dubness Family.

=== 2026 ===
Scheduled for 23–26 July 2026 at the Ostróda City Stadium and Amphitheatre. The edition is planned as the 25th anniversary edition of the festival.

- Amphitheatre Stage: Maleo, Tumbao, Shashamane, Konopians, W Innym Stanie, BezJahzgh.
- Red Stage: Dub Pistols, Hempress Sativa & The Unconquerebels, The Congos, Culture feat. Kenyatta Hill, Tabu, Reggaeside, I-Rey, Burning Spear, Alborosie & Shengen Clan, Samora Presents Female Reggae Voices feat. Yeza, Ammoye and Zoe Mazah, Bakshish, Paraliż Band, Gang Bawarii, Yelram, Marcus Gad, Blvk H3ro & Nadia McAnuff feat. K-Jah Sound, Vavamuffin, Sidney Polak, Ministry of Echology, Jamajki, Katharsis.
- Green Stage: Alpha Steppa x Nai-Jah, Tribute to Bas Tajpan, Singledread Sound, Dreadsquad feat. Kasia Malenda, Daddy Bozo & Butcher, Ondubground, Weeding Dub, PandaDread Sound System, Roots Revival Sound System, Dancehall Masak-Rah, Joint Venture Sound System, Splendid Sound, Pozyton Sound.
- Yellow Stage: Roots Trippin Sound System, LCS, Mack Moonshine, Radikal Guru, Heavy Wave Sound System, Bass Invaders, Ashwagundub Sound System, Bakers Sound System, Rise Up! Sound System, Fifti meets Bouquet, Fatty Fatty, Zion Land Soundsystem, Blizna Terror Sound.
- Molo Stage (DJ stage): Ras Emmanuel, Ciocia Olson, Rootboy and The Natties.
