= Bakshish =

Bakshish may refer to:

- Bakshish (band), a Polish reggae band
- Baksheesh, a tip or small gift (a gratuity), sometimes also used to mean a bribe in some contexts
