= Daab (band) =

Polish reggae band

Daab is a Polish reggae band. They were previously named Daab – Muzyka serc (heart music).

== History ==
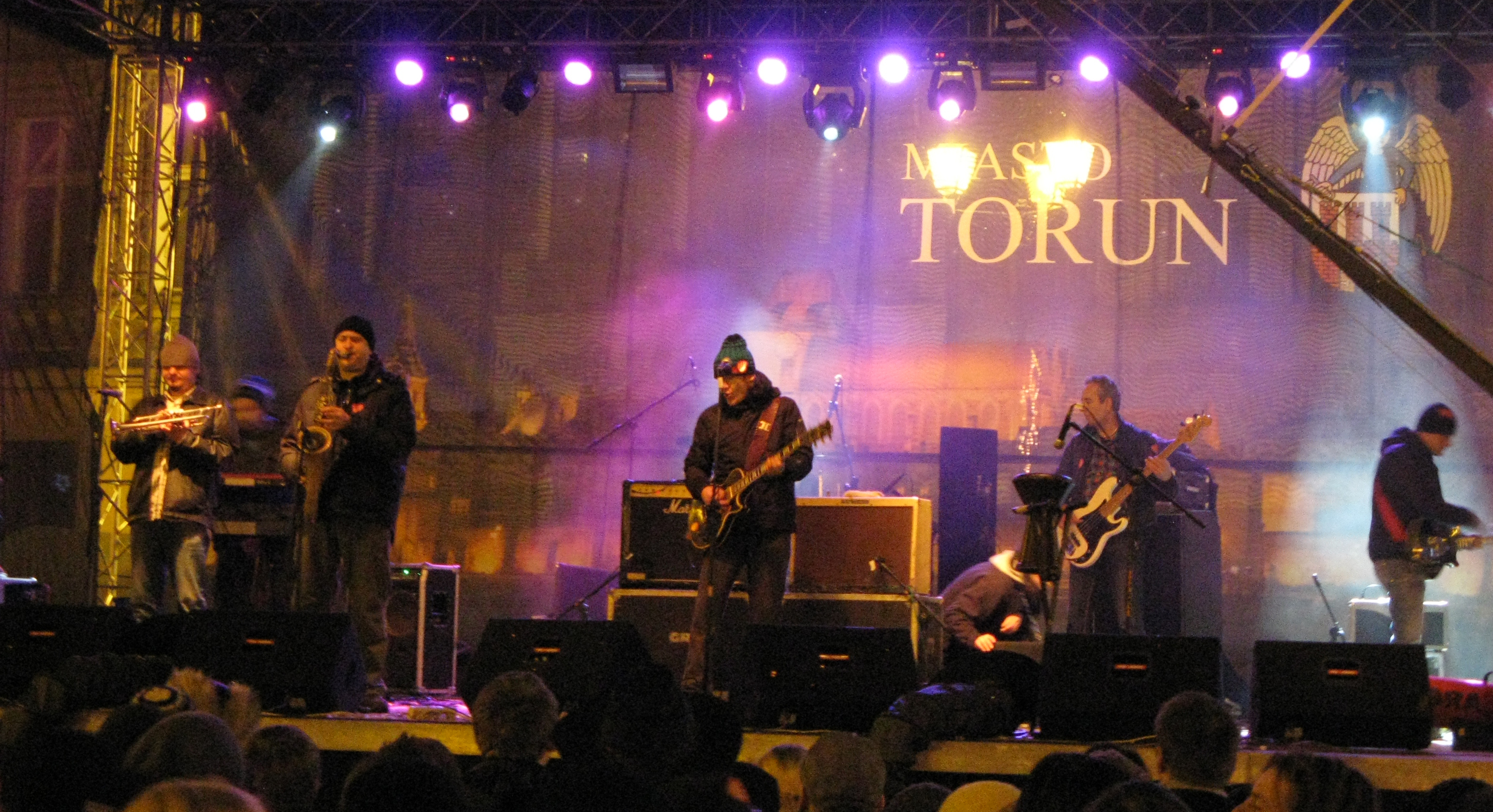
Daab band live concert in 2011

The band was founded in December 1982 in Warsaw by Dariusz Gierszewski/dr./, Andrzej Zeńczewski/voc.,g./, Artur Miłoszewski/b./ and Piotr Strojnowski/voc.,g./. In few months the band took on two other artists: Jacek Szymoniak and Jarosław Woszczyna. In next year DAAB joined Waldemar Deska and Andrzej Krzywy. That time they played songs like Do plastica and Przed nami wielka przestrzeń.

They played in the Netherlands, France, Denmark and USSR. In 1985 they released their new album called DAAB which had hits like Kalejdoskop moich dróg, Fala ludzkich serc, W zakamarkach naszych dusz, Fryzjer na plaży (instrumental), Ogrodu serce. The last of these has become a standard recommended for study in Polish schools. After this some changes in the band occurred. They added a new member Tomasz Pierzchalski and removed Jarosław Woszczyzna and Piotr Strojnowski who died in November, 2020 aged 62.

Andrzej Krzywy left the band soon and later became lead vocalist of De Mono In 1989, because of their friendship, they returned to the band to take a part in an anniversary gig – Jarocin rockfest. The band restructured into an organisation. The main members were Zeńczewski, Miłoszewski and Gierszewski. They worked with guitar players Michał Grymuza, Grzegorz Kloc, Jacek Wojcieszuk and brass section : Grzegorz Rytka and Piotr Korzeniowski .

=== Most important dates ===
- 1983 – birth of the band,
- 1985 – first album called Daab,
- 1987 – new album called Ludzkie uczucia,
- 1989 – another great album called III,
- 1993 – Tenth anniversary and new album To co najlepsze 1983-93,
- 1993 – Węgorzewo festival
- 2008 – Twenty-fifth anniversary celebrated on Przystanek Woodstock rockfest and Ostróda reggae festival .

=== Daab – current members ===
- Dariusz Gierszewski – drums
- Andrzej Zeńczewski – voc.guit.
- Artur Miłoszewski – bass
- Marek Makles – kbds
- Grzegorz Rytka – sax
- Piotr Korzeniowski – tr.
- Jacek Wojcieszuk – guit.

== Albums ==
- Daab
- Ludzkie uczucia
- III
- To co najlepsze 1983–93
