= Skankan =

Ska band from Poland

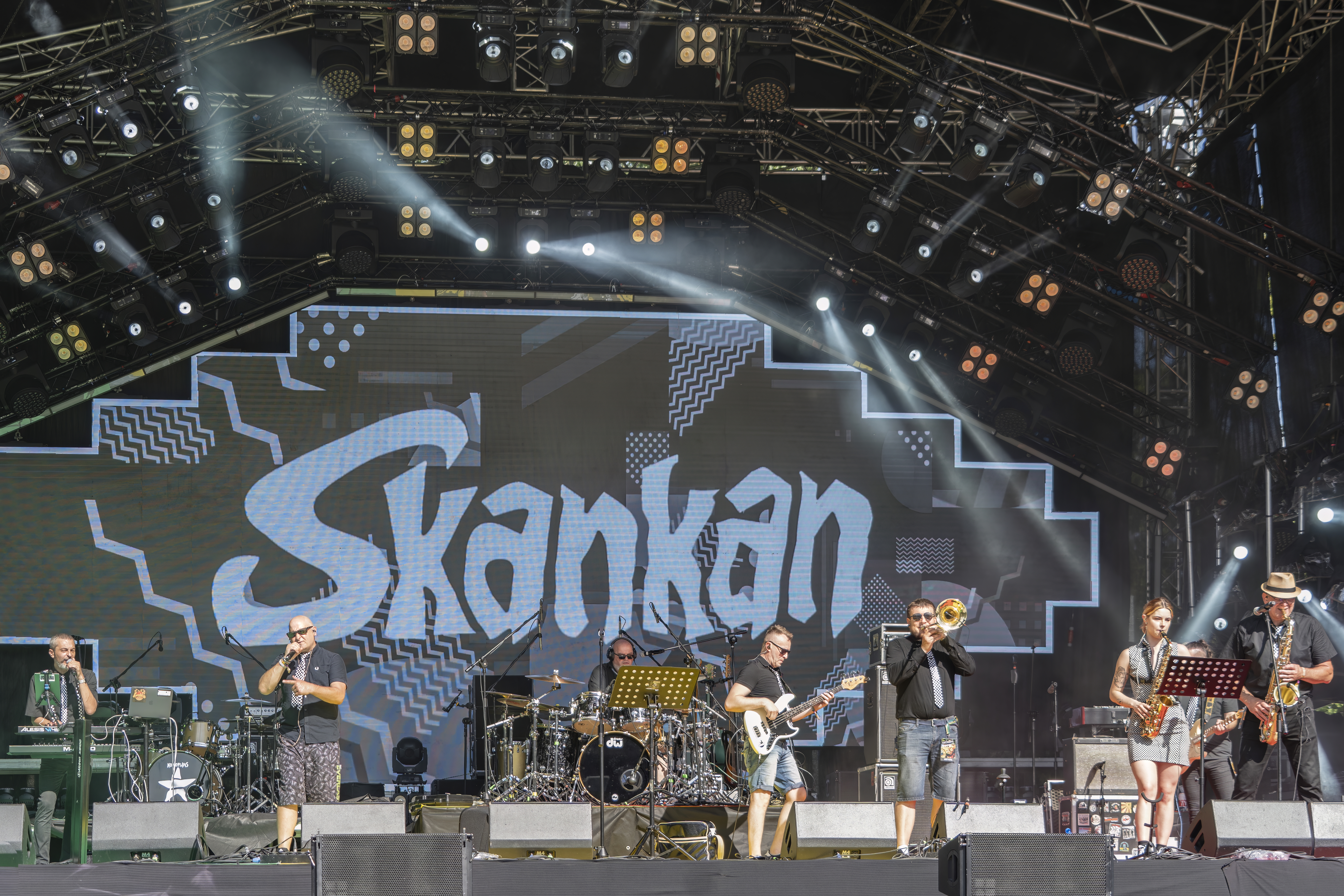
- Skankan at Ostróda Reggae Festival in 2025

Background information
- Origin: Sosnowiec, Poland
- Genres: Ska; reggae; rock and roll
- Years active: 1993–2010; 2019–present
- Members: Damian Jurak; Jarosław "Jarczys" Kamiński; Gaweł Kowalik; Sebastian "Miles" Lorek; Szczepan Łach; Maciej "Magic" Nawrocki; Andrzej "Gęga" Wroński; Justyna "Sysia" Aniołek†
- Website: https://www.facebook.com/kankanska

Skankan are a Polish ska band from Sosnowiec, southern Poland, who formed in 1993. They are often referred to as the most influential ska group in Poland, with the status of "legends" on the scene, having greatly contributed to the genre's popularisation in the country during the 1990s. Skankan disbanded in 2010, but after a hiatus returned in 2019.

== History ==
Although some sources list 1994 as the date of the band's official launch, when Skankan's members assembled as a proper line-up and began touring frequently, they actually first united in 1993 as a one-off project for the first WOŚP event at a liceum in Sosnowiec. By January 1994, the band consisted of 10 musicians and started playing regularly; their music was a mixture of ska, reggae, and rock 'n' roll. Although groups such as the Alibabki pioneered ska music in Poland as early as the 1960s, the genre remained relatively unknown on the local scenes in the following decades and it is largely due to the efforts of Skankan (and similar bands that followed in their footsteps) who, through their energetic sound and free "ska-parties", popularised ska on the Polish underground scene.

Skankan, as well as other Polish ska groups that formed locally (some of which were created by members of Skankan), greatly contributed to the reputation of Sosnowiec as a key hub of Polish ska, since the city came to be known as the "Polish Kingston". In their first several years of activity alone, Skankan performed at numerous clubs and took part in various Polish as well as international music festivals: Ska Fest – Bad Muskau 96', Ska & Reggae in Prague 97', and Przystanek Woodstock (1995–1999), Ostróda Reggae Festival (2010, 2022, 2025), among others. Skankan's growing popularity allowed them to play alongside some big names in the Polish and international music industry throughout the late 1990s and early 2000s. After being featured on Heatwave Blacklabel's Ska Trax – The Next Generation Part Three compilation in 1996, the band was able to go on a tour across Germany, which eventually gave them the opportunity to play alongside renowned ska musician Desmond Dekker in Berlin.

In the year 2000, TVP3 Katowice produced a documentary wholly dedicated to Skankan. During the same year, the group recorded music for Mieczysław Herba's film Randka w ciemno, starring Jerzy Stuhr. The band's members also took part in various musical projects over the years, such as assisting Püdelsi with recording the album Wolność słowa in 2003. In spring of 2010, sometime after the 2009 release of their album Try to feel it!, Skankan disbanded with no plans to return.

After almost 10 years of inactivity, Skankan was reactivated by founder Szczepan Łach and early drummer Sebastian Steć, who were soon joined by old-timers "Binkwa" and "Jarczys", as well as other experienced musicians. They returned to the stage live for the first time on 5 October 2019 in Kraków, for the Booze & Glory 10th birthday gig, playing alongside The Analogs, Zbeer, and others. Their return to the scene has been described as "the most important moment in the history of Polish ska". In October 2020, Skankan received the award for lifetime achievements in the field of culture from their home city of Sosnowiec.

== Band members ==
The band's founding members were: Szczepan Łach, Wojciech Kamiński, Dareczek, Tomasz Małpa, and Garczek.

=== Current members ===
- Damian Jurak – trombone (2019–present)
- Jarosław "Jarczys" Kamiński – saxophone (2019–present)
- Gaweł Kowalik – guitar (2019–present)
- Sebastian "Miles" Lorek - keyboards (2023-present)
- Szczepan Łach – drums (1993–1994), trumpet and vocals (1994–2010, 2019–present)
- Maciej "Magic" Nawrocki - drums (2020–present)
- Andrzej "Gęga" Wroński – bass guitar (2024–present)

=== Former members ===
- Wojciech "Wojo" Kamiński – saxophone (1993–2010)
- "Garczek" – vocals (1993–1994)
- Damian "Łysy" Dubiel – trombone (1993–1994)
- Dariusz "Dareczek" Jagiełka – guitar (1993–1994), bass guitar (1995–2004)
- Mariusz "Binkwa" Binkiewicz – guitar (1994–2009, 2019–2023)
- Wojciech Nowak – bass guitar (1994)
- Sebastian "Stecyk" Steć – drums (1994–1995, 2019–2020)
- Krzysztof "Krakus" Krakuski – trumpet (1994–2006)
- Remigian "Remik" Golec – electric guitar (1994–2001)
- "Zyta" – vocals (1994–1995)
- Paweł Hałat – electric guitar (1994–1995)
- Tomasz Małpa – bass guitar (1993–1995)
- Grzegorz "Tiger" Mosurek – vocals (1995–2010)
- Kamil "Zwierzak" Gorgoń – drums (1995–2010)
- Justyna Ludkowska – trombone (1998–2000)
- Łukasz "Zoltar" Gorgoń – guitar (2002–2010)
- Arkadiusz "Kwiaciu" Kwiatkowski – trombone (2005–2010)
- Ania "Owca" Szymanek – bass guitar (2005–2010)
- Adrian "Admin" Puta – acoustician (2005–2010)
- Robert "Trąbuś" Niepostyn – trumpet (2007–2010)
- Robert "Wypłosz" Pudelski – trumpet (2019–2020)
- Michał "Oczko" Jednaki – bass guitar (2019–2024)
- Sebastian Baczewski – trumpet (2020–2022)
- Kamil "Savage" Kowalczyk – saxophone, vocal (2019–2022)
- Stanisław Student – keyboards (2019–2022)

== Discography ==
=== Albums ===
- Rytm'n'Ska (1994)
- M.D. Dżolo (1995)
- Live '95 (1995)
- Skankan ożywia trupy (1996)
- Try to feel it! (2009)
- Bourbon Whiskey Gin (2022)

=== Singles ===
- Menel Song (2024)
- Amore (2024)

=== Compilations ===
- Ska Trax – The Next Generation Part Three (Heatwave Blacklabel, 1996)
- Żary 1997 (1997)
- Wakacyjne Zagranie Czyli Przystanek Woodstock (XL, 1998)
- SKAdanka czyli ska po polsku (Machina, 1999)
- Punks, Skins & Rudeboys Now! Vol. 2 (Rock’n’Roller – Garaż Nr 12, 1999)
- Pol-SKA Norma (Rock’n’Roller, 2001)
- Muzyka Ulicy – Muzyka Dla Mas Vol.1 (Olifant Records, 2004)[25]
- United Colors of Ska 4.0 (Pork Pie, 2007)
- Punks, Skins & Rudeboys Now! Vol. 18 (Jimmy Jazz Records – Garaż Nr 28, 2009)
- Punky Reggae Rockers – 04 (Lou & Rocked Boys, 2010)
- 18 Lat Lou & Rocked Boys – Folk side (Lou & Rocked Boys, 2016)
- SkaSety.PL vol.1 (2021)
- Ultra Chaos Piknik 2022/2023 (2024)
- Detective Ska Compil Vol.4 (2024)

=== Guest appearances ===
- Frontside – Moja Własna Tolerancja (Enigmatic Records, 1997)
- Püdelsi – Wolność Słowa (Warner Music Poland, 2003)
- Bandog – Way To Disorder (Defense Records, 2018)
- S.O.S Angeles – Jingle Bell Zagłębie Ska (2024)

=== Music videos ===
- Człowieniu, Człowieniu (2002, directed by Paweł Bogocz)
- Feel It (2009)
- Brunetki, blondynki (2009)
- Stado Muszek (2019)
- No Regrets (2020)
- Kołysanka Dla Dareczka (2020)
- Amore (2024)
