= Dub Inc =

French reggae and dub band

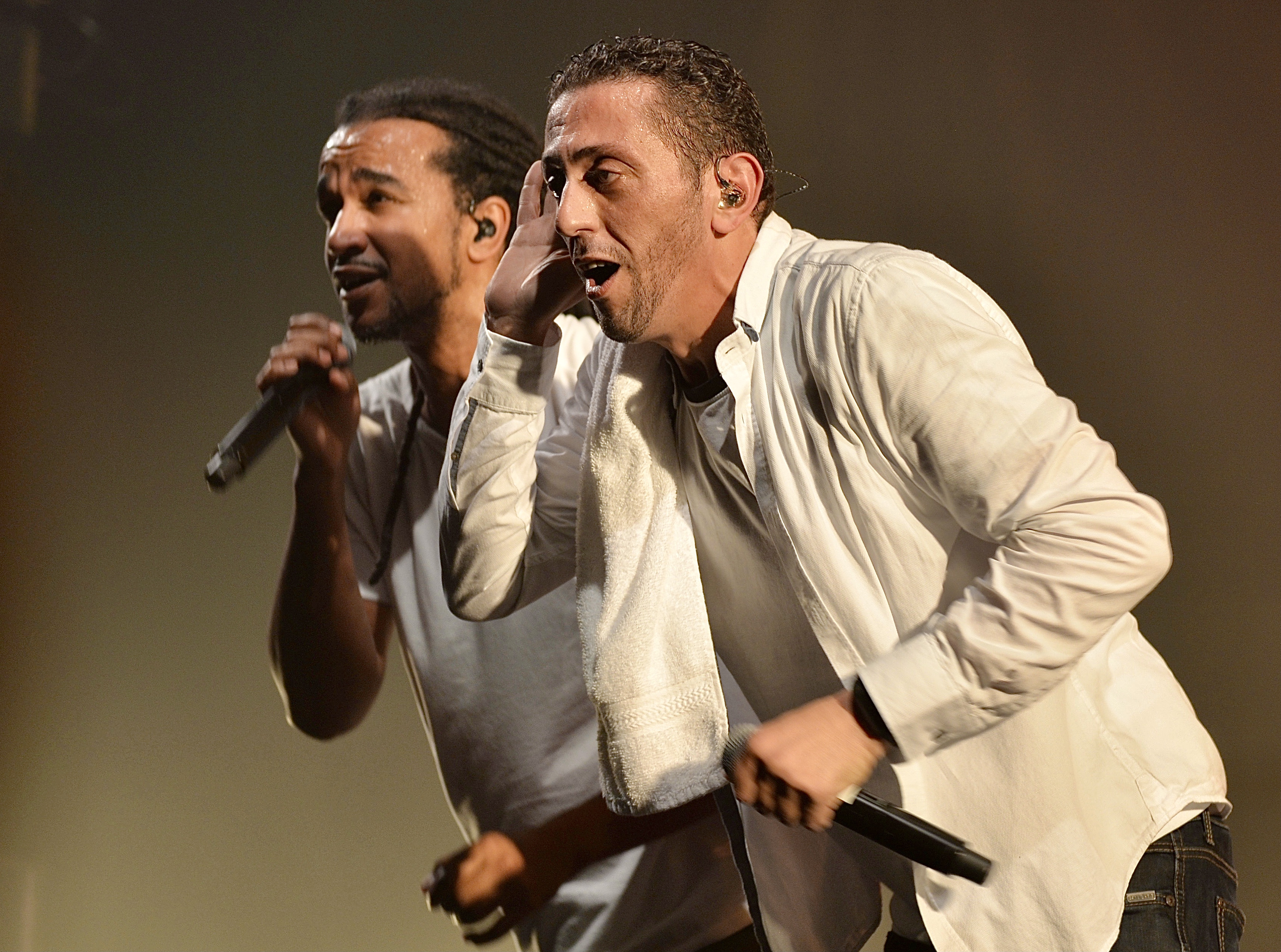
- Dub Inc performing live in Brussels, Belgium, 2016

Background information
- Origin: France
- Genres: Reggae, dancehall, dub
- Years active: 1997–present
- Labels: Diversité
- Members: Hakim "Bouchkour" Meridja; Aurélien "Komlan" Zohou; Jérémie Grégeois; Moritz Von Korff; Frédéric Peyron; Idir Derdiche; Grégory "Zigo" Mavridorakis
- Website: dubinc.org

Dub Inc (previously known as Dub Incorporation) is a French reggae band from Saint-Étienne, active since 1997. They combine a range of styles, including dancehall, dub, ska and rap. Their music is also influenced by African music with their songs being sung in a mixture of French, English and Kabyle.

The band has released seven studio albums. The first three, Diversité (2003), Dans le décor (2005) and Afrikya (2008) to Dub Incorporation. However, starting with Hors Contrôle (2010), Paradise (2013), So What (2016), and Millions (2019), they shortened their name and credited the albums to Dub Inc.

Rude Boy Story is the first documentary film released about the band.

== Members ==
Lead vocals

- Hakim "Bouchkour" Meridja
- Aurélien "Komlan" Zohou

Lead guitar

- Jérémie Grégeois

Bass

- Moritz Von Korff

Keyboards

- Frédéric Peyron
- Idir Derdiche

Drums & Percussions

- Grégory "Zigo" Mavridorakis

Management

- Mathieu

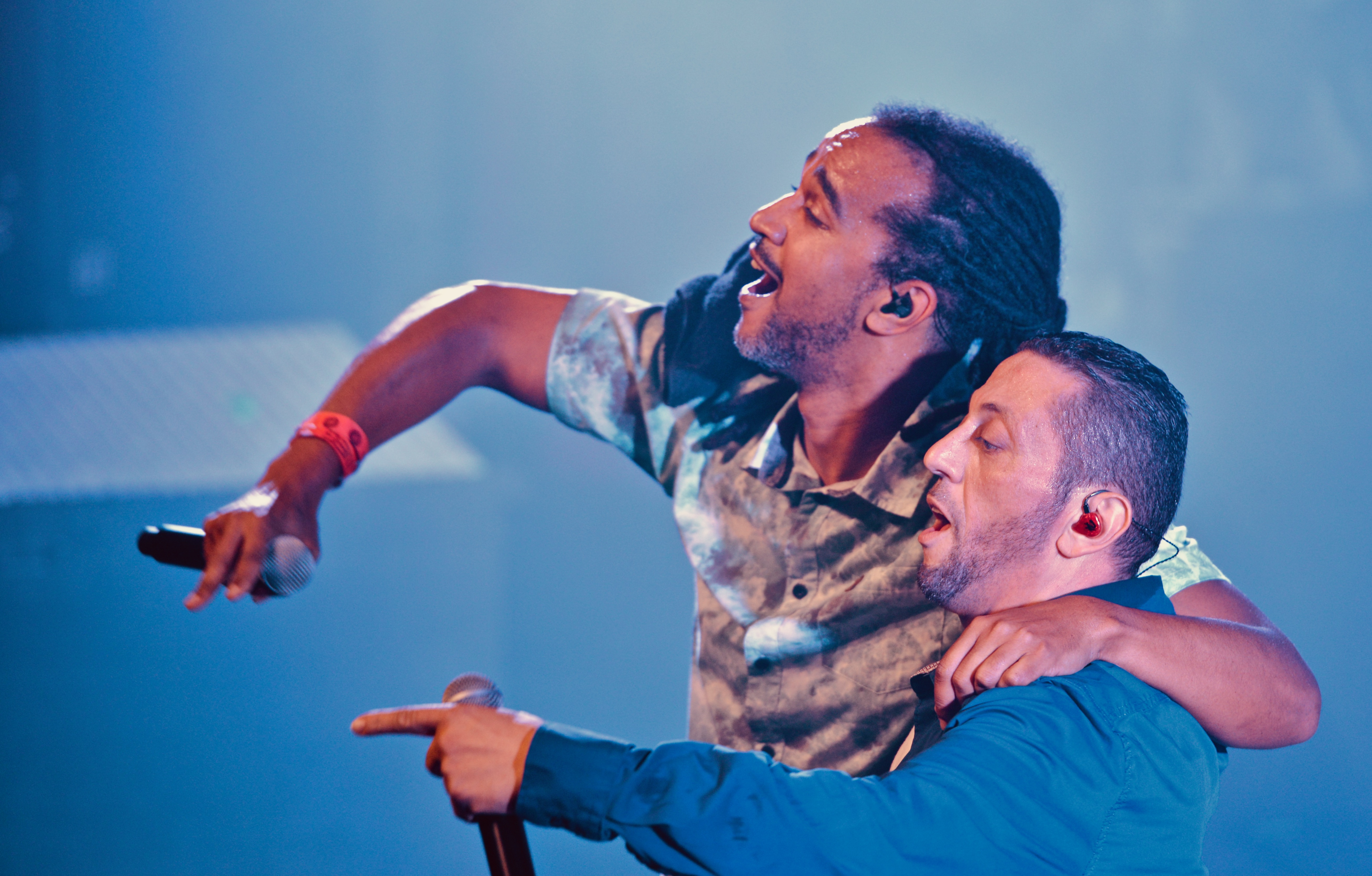
Dub Inc (2019)

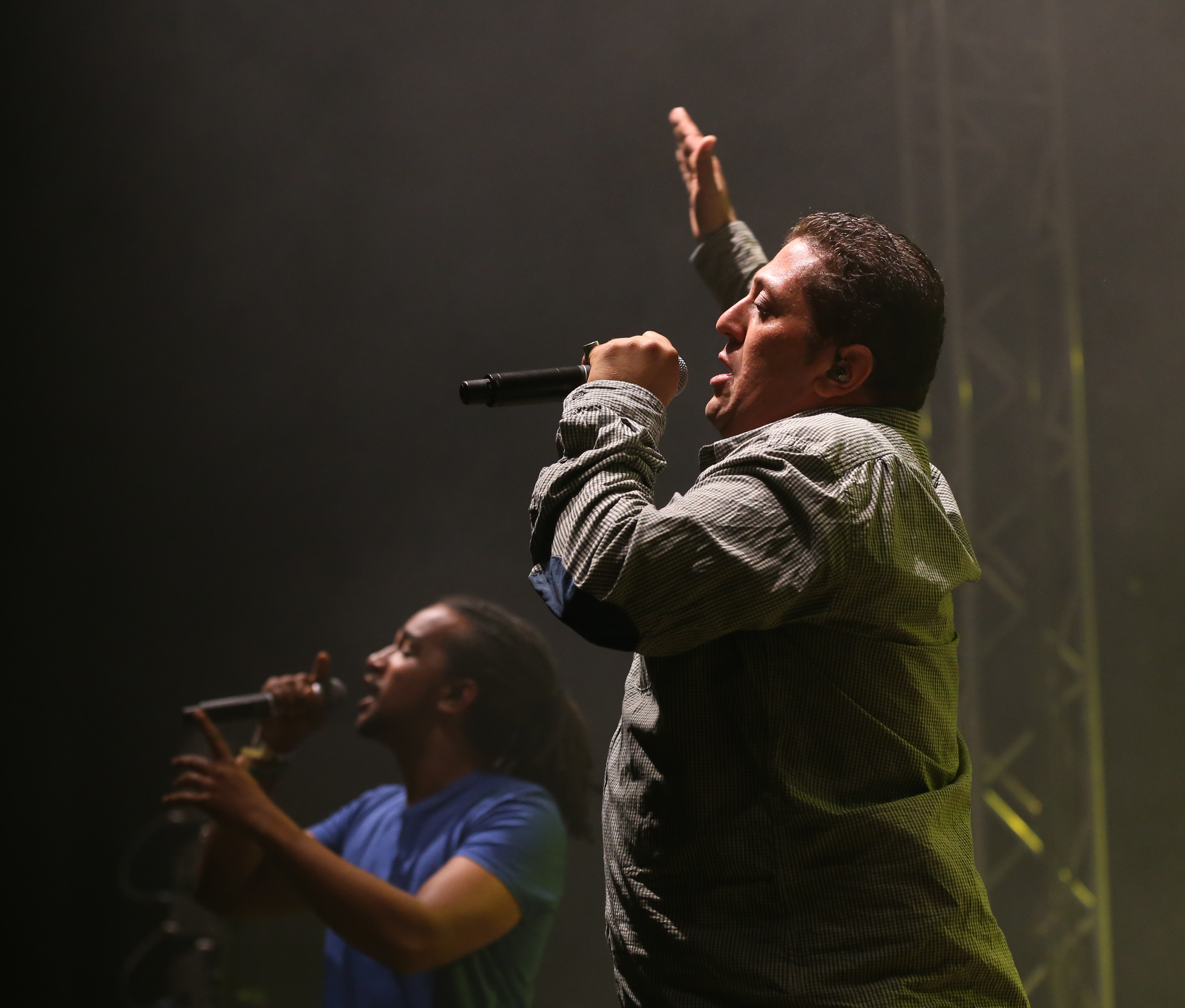
Dub Inc (2013)

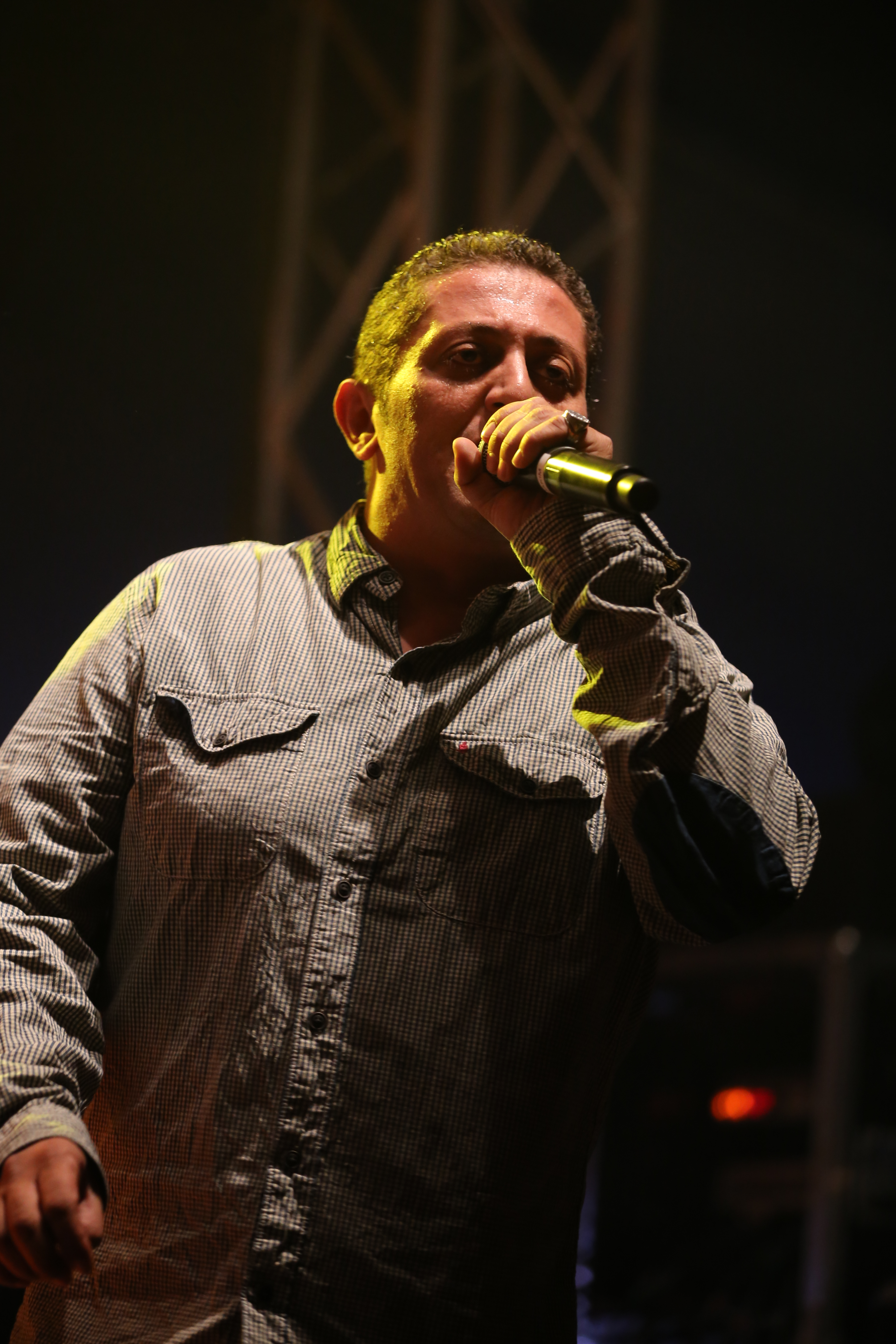
Hakim Meridja (2013)

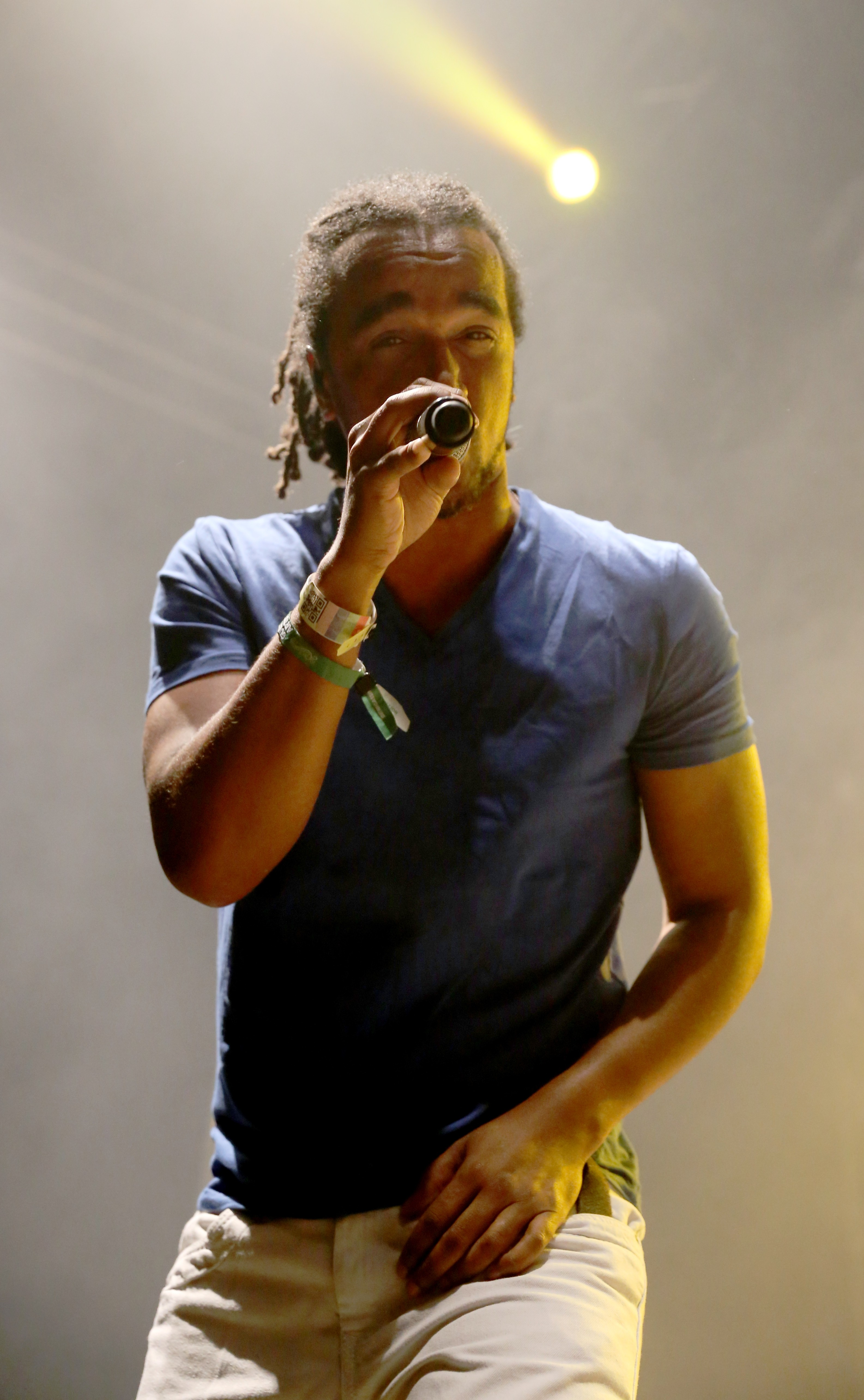
Aurélien Zohou (2013)

== Discography ==
=== Albums ===
Year	Album	Peak positions			Notes
Year	Album	FRA	BEL (Wa)	SWI	Notes
2003	Diversité	141	—	—	1. My Freestyle; 2. Visions; 3. Life (feat. Tiken Jah Fakoly); 4. Rude Boy; 5. Murderer; 6. Holy Mount; 7. Galérer; 8. L'échiquier; 9. I'n'i Soldier; 10. Écran Total; 11. Diversité; 12. See Di Youth
2005	Dans le décor	61	—	—	1. Survie; 2. One Shot; 3. Monnaie (feat. Lyricson); 4. Chaines; 5. A Imma; 6. Decor; 7. Achatah (feat. Omar Perry); 8. Bla Bla; 9. Face A Soi; 10. Speed (feat. David Hinds of Steel Pulse); 11. La Corde Raide; 12. Never Stop; 13. Never More
2008	Afrikya	29	—	100	1. Métissage; 2. Day after day 3. Do sissi 4. Fara fina 5. SDF; 6. Tiens bon 7. Djamila; 8. Afrikya; 9. Jump up again 10. Myself; 11. For all di youth 12. Petit soldat 13. Même si 14. Même dub
2010	Hors contrôle	27	—	—	1. Tout ce qu’ils veulent 2. Laisse le temps 3. Dos à dos 4. No doubt (feat. Tarrus Riley); 5. Crazy Island; 6. Ego.com; 7. El Djazzaïr (feat. Jimmy Oihid & Amazigh Kateb); 8. Funambule; 9. Bang bang 10. Children; 11. On a les armes 12. Fils de 13. Get mad 14. Unité; 15. Mélodie
2013	Paradise	181	137	—	1. Revolution; 2. Better run 3. Paradise; 4. Chaque nouvelle page 5. Partout dans ce monde 6. They want (feat. Skarra Mucci); 7. Foudagh; 8. Il faut qu'on ose 9. Sounds good 10. Hurricane; 11. Enfants des ghettos (feat. Meta Dia, Alif Naaba); 12. Only love (feat. Jah Mason); 13. Dub contrôle
2016	So What	16	—	59	1. Grand Périple; 2. Exil; 3. So What; 4. No Matter Where You Come From; 5. Triste époque 6. Love Is The Meaning; 7. Don't Be a Victim (feat. Naâman); 8. Maché Bécif; 9. Justice (feat. Mellow Mood); 10. Comme de l'or 11. Fêlés; 12. Ragga Bizness; 13. Rise Up; 14. Erreurs du passé
2019	Millions	—	—	—	1. On est ensemble 2. Couleur; 3. Dans ta ville 4. À tort ou à raison 5. À la fois 6. Chaâbi; 7. Millions; 8. Authentique; 9. Nos armes 10. My Bro'; 11. My Dub; 12. Fake news 13. Inès; 14. En nous
2022	Futur	—	—	—	1. "Allons leur dire" 2. "Nos héros" (feat. Balik); 3. "Tour du monde" 4. "Il est temps" (feat. Taïro); 5. "Peu importe" 6. "Mélodie rebelle" 7. "Terre promise" 8. "Bad boy" (feat. Alborosie); 9. "Mazal" (feat. Democratoz); 10. "Puzzle"; 11. "Limites"; 12. "Diamant"; 13. "Jamais seul" 14. "Doctor dancehall" 15. "People of the world" (feat. Kumar)
2025	Atlas	—	—	—	1. Atlas; 2. Décibels; 3. Drapeaux; 4. Comment faire 5. Break the Silence feat. Kabaka Pyramid; 6. Ma Bataille; 7. Mémories feat. Marcus Gad; 8. Don't Let Me Down; 9. Motive Comme Personne; 10. Il Le Faut; 11. Étoile filante 12. Atlas Dub

Live albums

Year	Album	Peak positions	Notes
Year	Album	FRA	Notes
2006	Dub Inc Live	104	1. Aéro dub 2. Dario's dub 3. Hakimniktou; 4. L'échiquier; 5. Maquette 2; 6. Maquette 3.2 + Irie; 7. Police murderer 8. Rude boy 9. This way
2015	Paradise Tour	150	1. Intro; 2. Tout ce qu'ils veulent 3. Monnaie; 4. Dos à dos 5. Chaque nouvelle page 6. Métissage; 7. Paradise; 8. Laisse le temps 9. Il faut qu'on ose 10. Better run 11. Murderer; 12. Get Mad; 13. Partout dans ce monde 14. My freestyle 15. They Want; 16. Fils de 17. Foudagh; 18. Chaînes; 19. Rude boy 20. Sounds good

=== Singles ===
Year	Single	Peak positions	Album
Year	Single	FRA	Album
2007	"Version 1.2."	91	
