= Pol'and'Rock Festival =

Annual music festival in Poland

Coordinates: 52°36′41″N 14°40′05″E

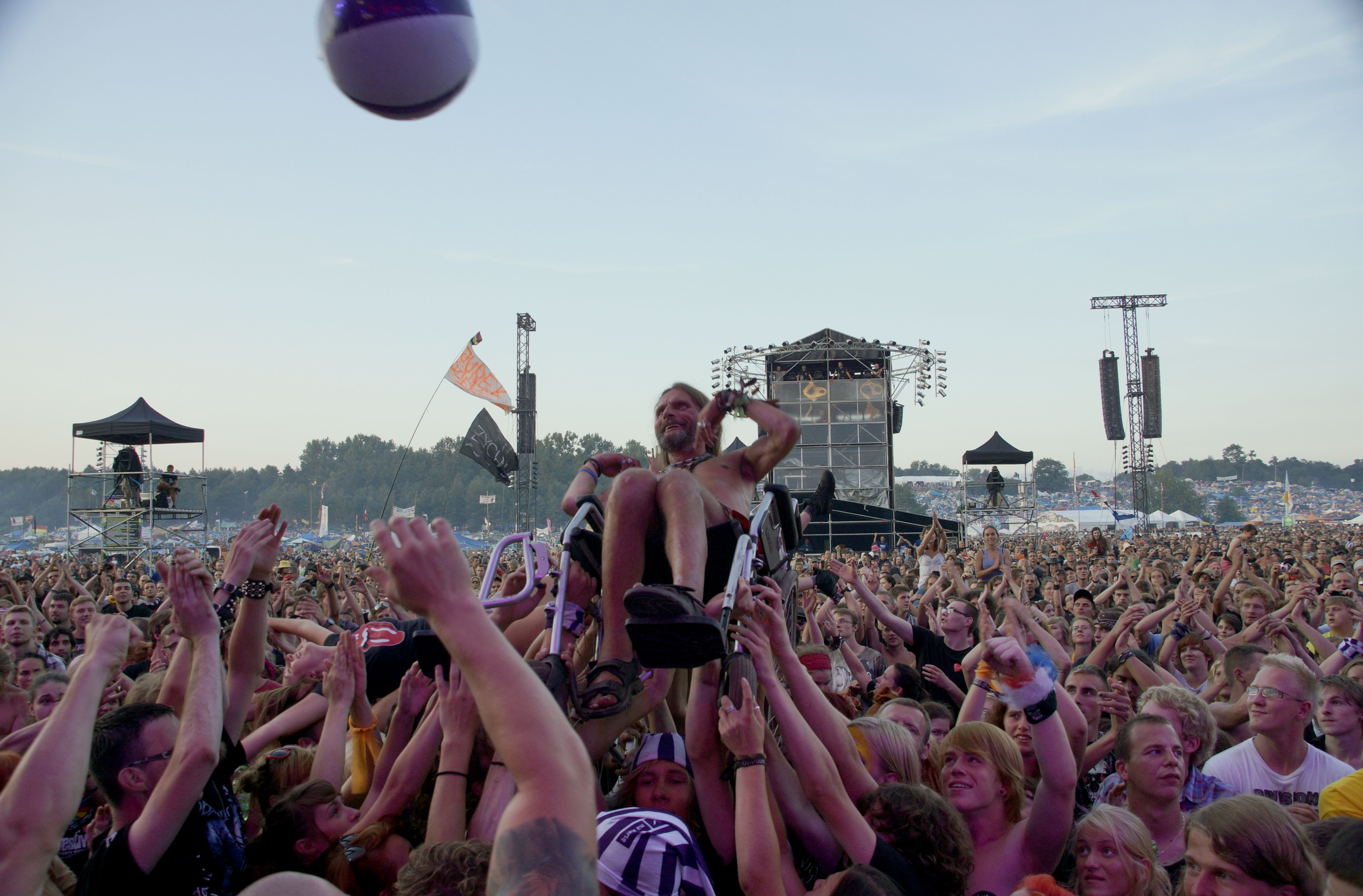
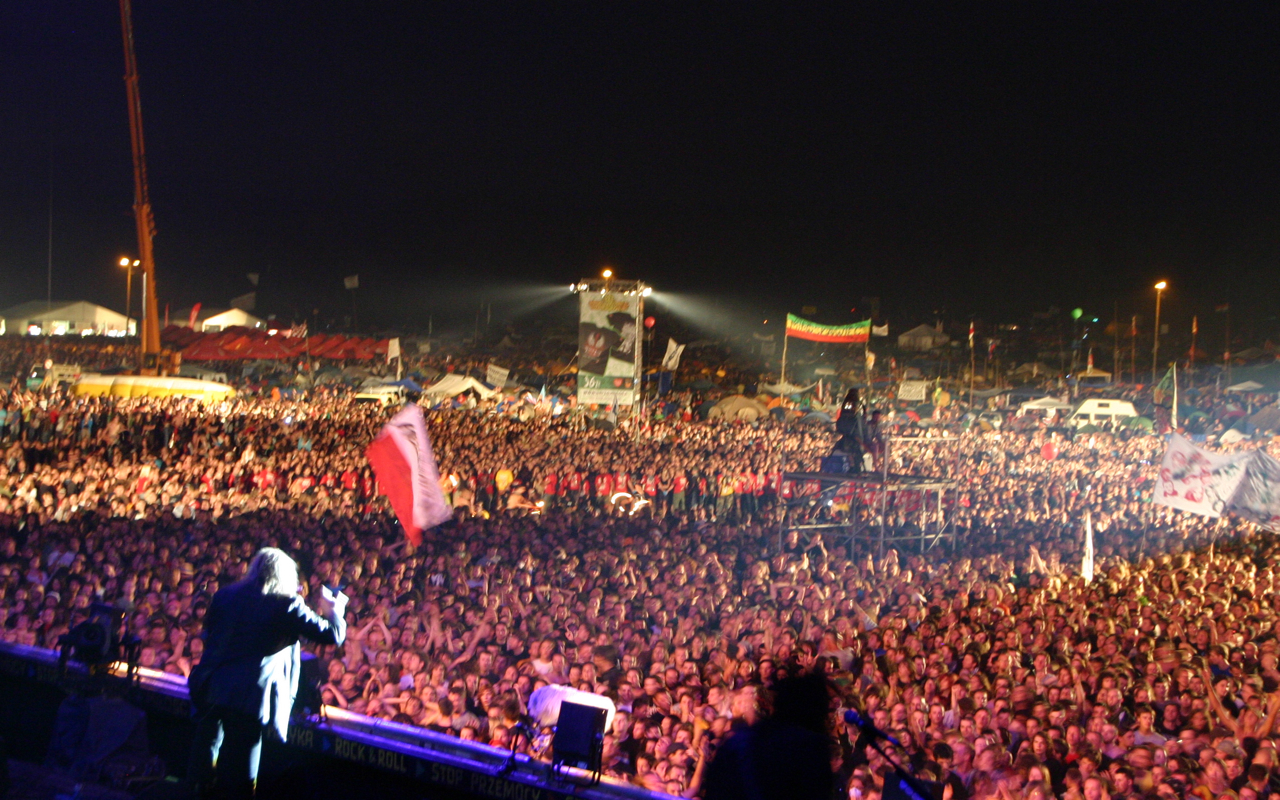
- Genre: Rock, punk rock, reggae, rapcore, folk music, heavy metal, electronic music
- Dates: The end of July/beginning of August
- Locations: Czaplinek, Poland
- Years active: 1995–present
- Founders: Jerzy Owsiak
- Attendance: 750,000 (2019)
- Website: en.polandrockfestival.pl

Pol'and'Rock Festival, formerly known as Woodstock Festival Poland (Polish: Przystanek Woodstock; "Woodstock Station") is an annual free rock music festival in Poland, inspired by the Woodstock festival. The festival has been held since 1995. In 2009, Woodstock Festival Poland gathered an audience of over 400,000 people, in 2011, the attendance was above 700,000, in 2012, about 550,000 people, in 2013, about 500,000, and in 2014, the attendance reached a record high of about 750,000. In 2019, the aggregate attendance of the festival was 750,000, making it one of the biggest music festivals in the world.

== Background ==
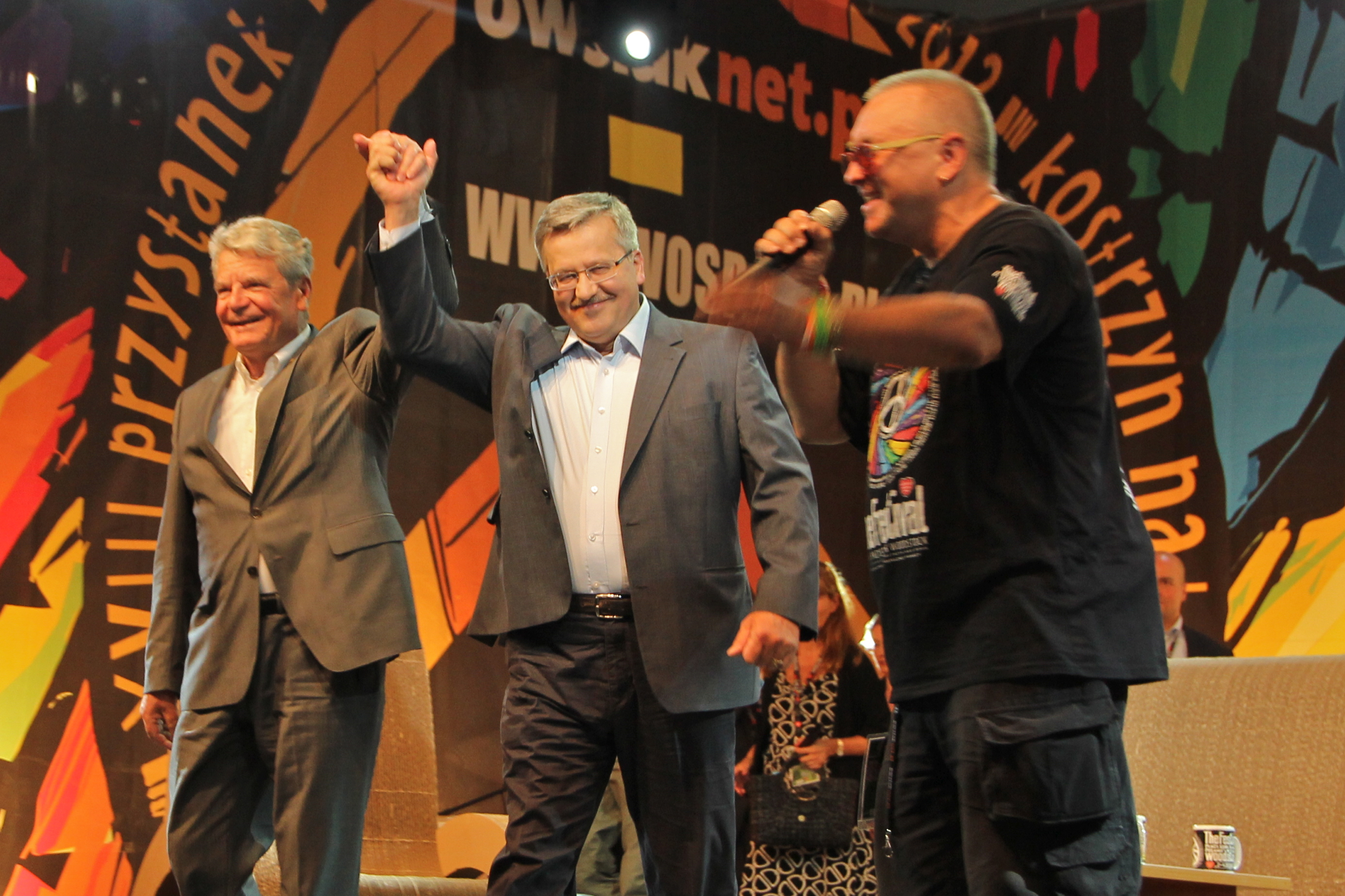
Presidents Bronisław Komorowski and Joachim Gauck at Woodstock Festival Poland 2012

The festival was initiated in 1994 by Jerzy Owsiak after his trip to the United States where he attended the Woodstock Festival, which was held after a 25-year hiatus. The festival's official motto is Love, Friendship, Music. The event is held by the Great Orchestra of Christmas Charity as a way of thanking its volunteers. Generally a weekend-long event, its two stages are in continuous use from early afternoon to dawn, featuring performances by around 30 bands every year. Many Polish musicians and bands have made several appearances, including IRA, Decapitated, Myslovitz, Maria Peszek, Kamil Bednarek, Dżem, Acid Drinkers, Lessdress, Hey, Riverside, Kult and The Analogs. International bands are also invited every year – Skunk Anansie, Sabaton, Judas Priest, Within Temptation, Shaggy, The Stranglers, Papa Roach, The Prodigy, Kaiser Chiefs, Ugly Kid Joe, You Me at Six, Guano Apes, Kontrust, Clawfinger, Nigel Kennedy, Gentleman, Korpiklaani, Dream Theater, Accept, Paradise Lost, Gojira, Testament, Arch Enemy, Soulfly, Amon Amarth, New Model Army, Apocalyptica, Jinjer, Anthrax, Helloween, Kreator, Type O Negative, Vader, Killing Joke, Life of Agony, Dog Eat Dog, Bullet for My Valentine, Machine Head, Bring Me the Horizon, House of Pain, In Flames, Ziggy Marley, Napalm Death, Apollo 440, Biohazard, Spin Doctors, Venom Inc, Agnostic Front, among many others. Festival promoters also aim to promote emerging talent – and a competition is held prior to the festival, and the winners are given a chance to perform at the festival. The main musical theme is generally rock, but genres range from folk through experimental to metal. Recent years have also seen reggae, electronic music and even classical music represented.

The name Przystanek Woodstock – "Woodstock Station" – refers to peace and friendship symbolized by the Woodstock Festival and the TV series Northern Exposure, aired as Przystanek Alaska (Alaska Station), immensely popular in Poland at that time. The name of the festival was changed to Pol'and'Rock Festival on March 8, 2018. The change was motivated by licensing dispute with the agency representing Michael Lang. The new name reflects both the rock'n'roll roots of the event and the strong ties to the heritage of the Polish democratic and freedom fighting movement. The organizers of the festival claim that even though the name of the festival has changed, the ethos behind the event remains unchanged.

Along with the concerts on five stages there are many other events organized during the festival. The Akademia Sztuk Przepięknych ("Academy of Finest Arts") is a place where young people participate in panel discussions with well-known politicians, artists, journalists, musicians, actors and religious leaders. The guests have included Lech Wałęsa, Bronisław Komorowski, Joachim Gauck, Kesang Takla (the Dalai Lama's Northern European representative), Olga Tokarczuk, Tadeusz Mazowiecki, Marek Belka, Andrzej Wajda, Marek Kondrat, Joanna Kulig, Janusz Gajos, Jerzy Buzek, Kuba Wojewódzki, Agnieszka Holland, Bogusław Linda, Dorota Masłowska, Leszek Balcerowicz, Włodek Pawlik, Magdalena Środa, Jerzy Stuhr, Szymon Hołownia, Wojciech Pszoniak and Adam Bodnar. The festival also showcases dozens of NGO organizations such as Greenpeace, Polish Humanitarian Action, animal rights activists and many other 'third sector' organizations and initiatives.

== History ==
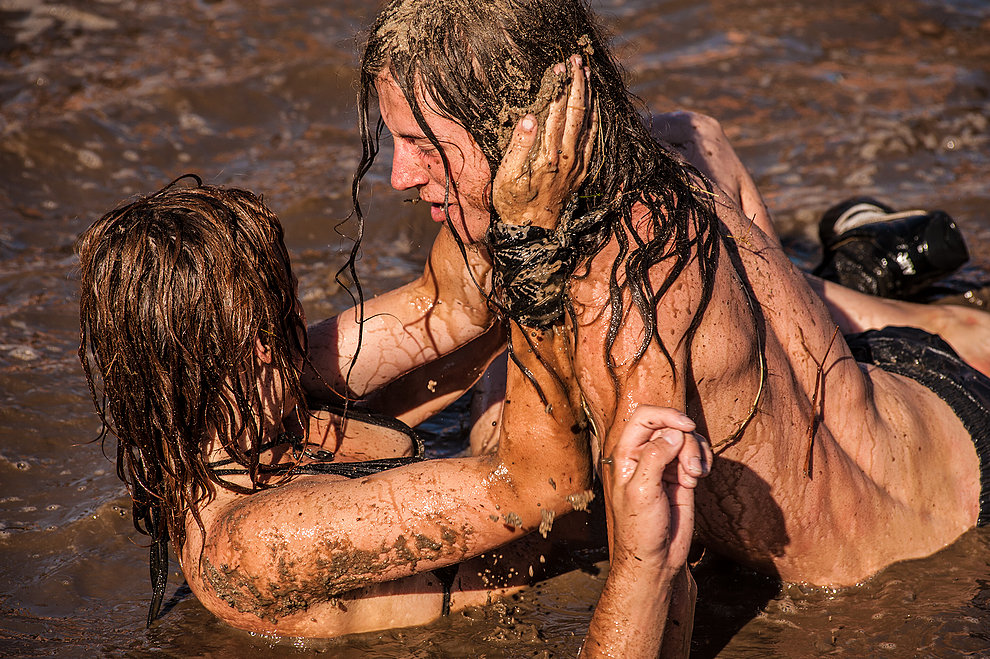
Mud baths are part of festival tradition

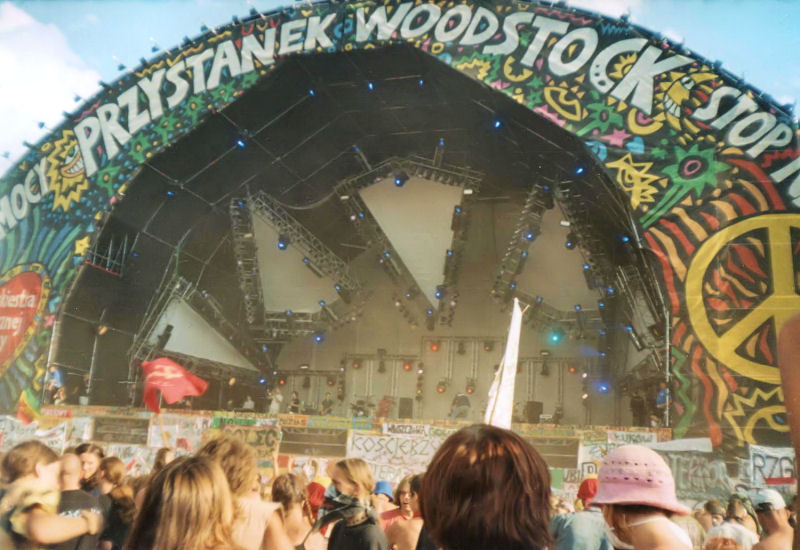
Woodstock Festival Poland, Żary 2003

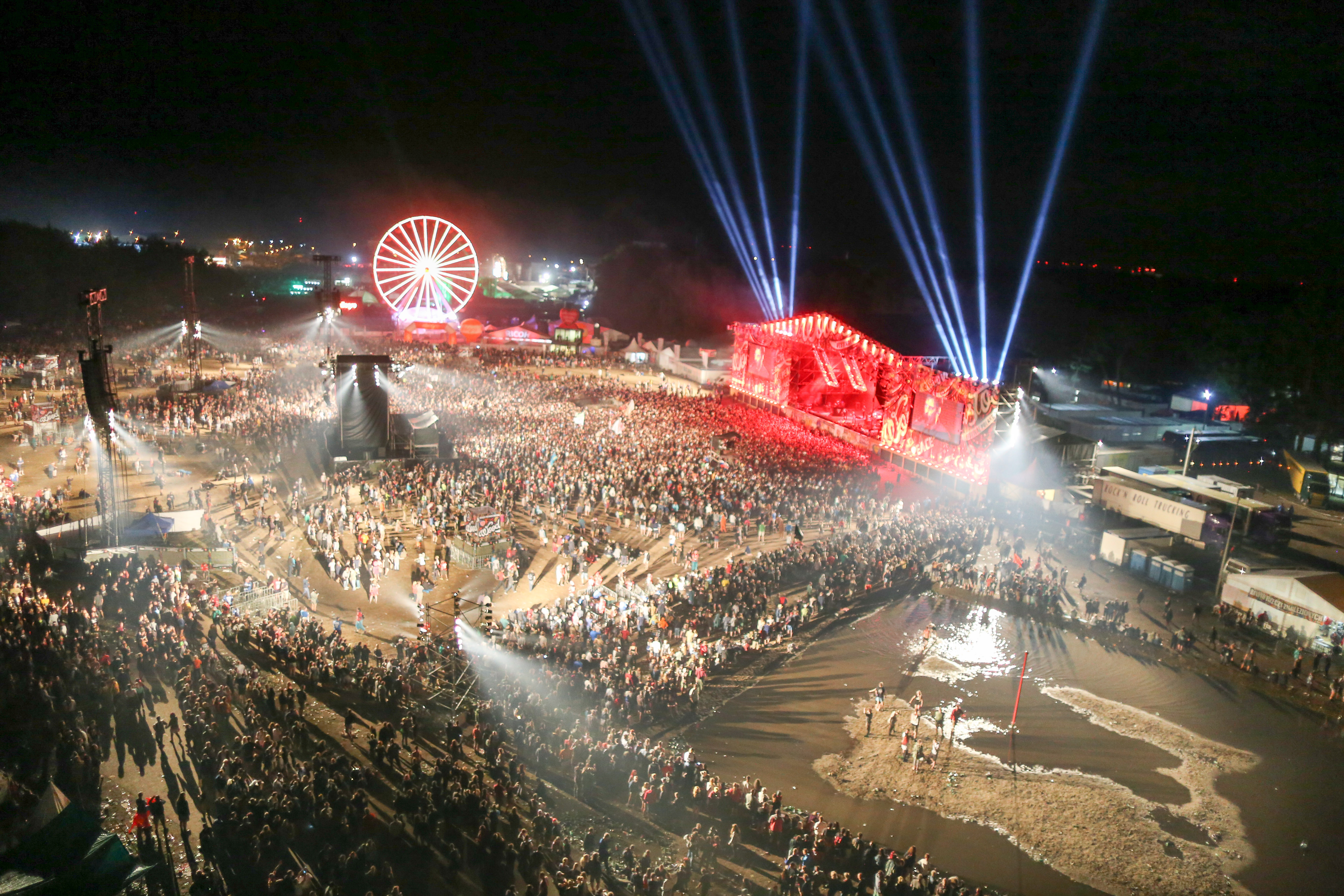
Woodstock Festival Poland 2017

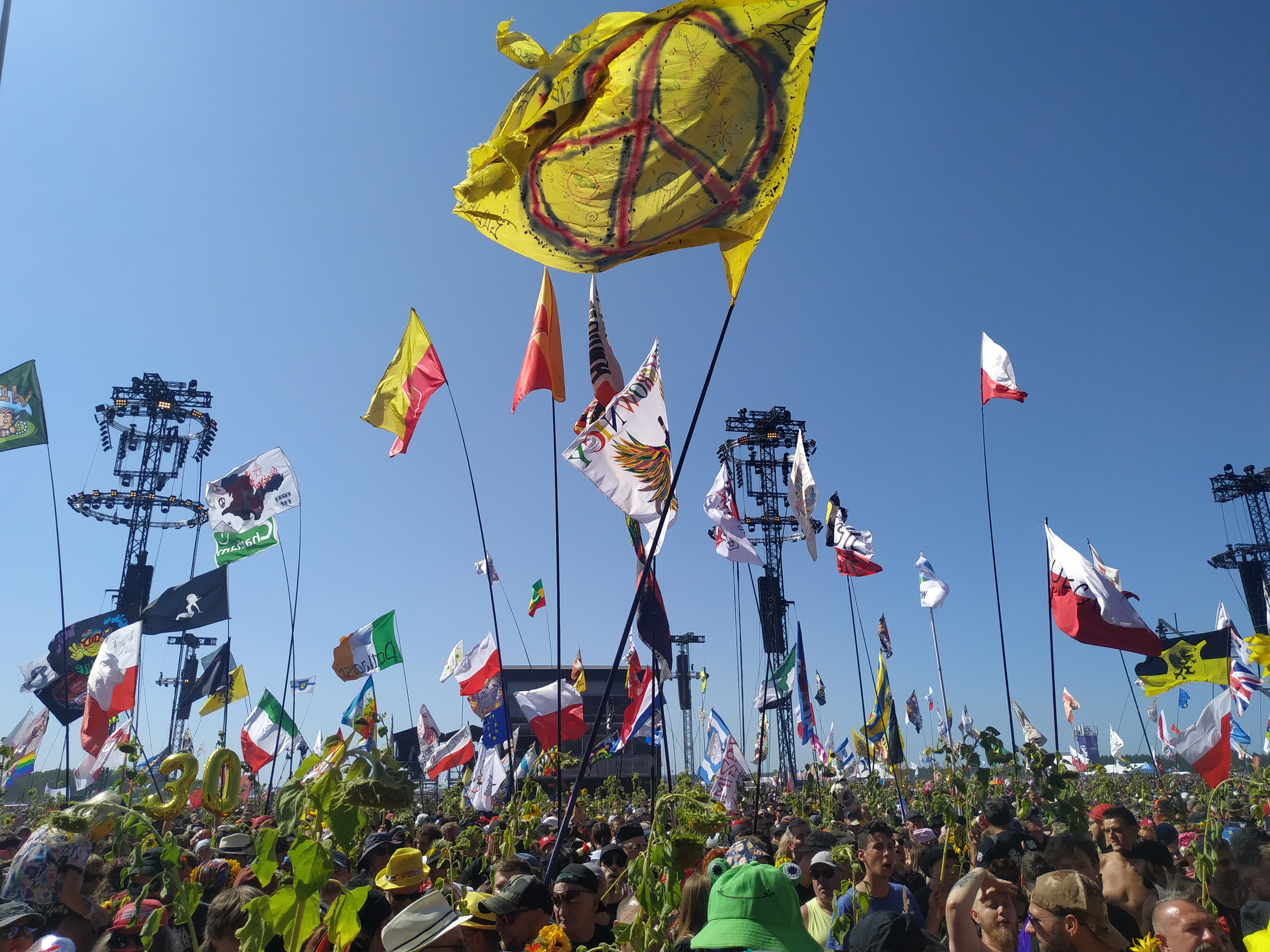
The audience during the opening of festival in 2024

First Woodstock Festival Poland took place on 15–16 July 1995, in the town of Czymanowo (near Gnewin), located near the Żarnowieckie Lake. The performers included Carrantouhill, Skankan, Żuki, Myslovitz, Ira, and Urszula. During the festival no alcohol was sold, which was similar to the Jarocin festivals.

The second festival was held in Szczecin-Dąbie, Szczecin in 1996. This time the first Woodstock's "prohibition law" was partially lifted and beer was sold.

The third festival took place the next year, on 16–17 August in the town of Żary, which became the setting of the Przystanek Woodstock festivals until 2003. Initially, the festival was planned to be held in July, but because of the 1997 flood, which affected much of Poland, the festival was postponed until August.

The 1998 Woodstock Festival Poland featured the performances of nearly 50 bands. The band list included Closterkeller, Akurat, Oddział Zamknięty, Kobranocka, and Acid Drinkers. Almost 150,000 people attended the festival.

The 1999 Woodstock was held on 6–8 August. This time the attendance record was broken. The audience reached almost 200,000 people.

The 2000 festival was planned to be held in Lębork, but due to permission uncertainties, and protest of local committees (Komitet obrony Moralności - The Committee for the Defense of Morality) it had to be cancelled. Nevertheless, over 1000 people showed up and organized an unauthorized "rock'n'roll picnic" without any professional music bands. This happening was later referred to as the "Dziki Przystanek" ("The Wild Station").

In 2001 Żary was again the setting for the festival. The 2002 Woodstock was significant, because it was filmed, and the footage was used to produce "Przystanek Woodstock. Najgłośniejszy Film Polski" ("The Woodstock Station. The Loudest Film In Poland"), a concert film, which was screened in movie theatres across the country the following year, and also took part in a number of international film festivals.

The 2003 Woodstock was the last one held in the town of Żary. Because of controversy surrounding some incidents during the festival, that Jerzy Owsiak was part of, it was decided that Żary would no longer be a setting for the concerts.

From 2004 to 2019, the festival took place in the town of Kostrzyn nad Odrą. In 2011 the festival featured such bands as The Prodigy and Helloween. In 2012, the Swedish power metal band Sabaton performed at the festival, recording the set as a live album, Swedish Empire Live. In the following years the festival hosted such famous artists as Anthrax in 2013, Accept in 2014, Black Label Society in 2015, Arch Enemy and Judas Priest in 2018 or Prophets of Rage on the last edition in Kostrzyn in 2019. Performances by stars such as Limp Bizkit and Static-X were announced for 2020, but due to the pandemic, these concerts did not take place.

In 2020 an online festival was held due to the covid pandemic, livestreamed from Transcolor Studio in Szeligi near Warsaw. The 2021 edition was held on the Makowice-Płoty airfield in Western Pomerania with limited attendance.

Since 2022 the festival has been held on the Broczyno airfield in Czaplinek, Western Pomerania.

== See also ==
- List of historic rock festivals
- List of jam band music festivals
