= Ostróda Castle =

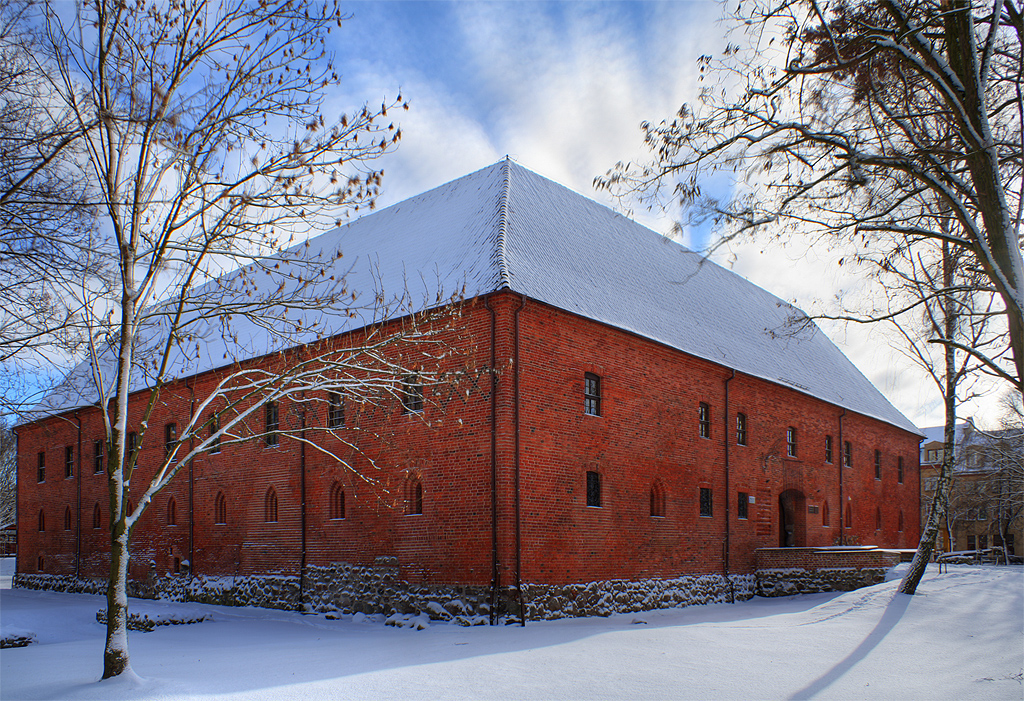
- Ostróda Castle in snow

- Location of Ostróda Castle in Poland Ostróda Castle (Warmian-Masurian Voivodeship)
- 53°42′12″N 19°57′40″E
- Location: Ostróda, Warmian-Masurian Voivodeship, in Poland

History
- Built: 1350-1370
- Demolished: 1381; 1788; 1945
- Rebuilt: in between the years of 1407–1410; around 1788; 1977-1992

Site notes
- Architectural style: Gothic

Ostróda Castle is a castle located in the region of the Ostróda County, Warmian-Masurian Voivodeship; in Poland.

== History ==
The first Teutonic stronghold in the area comes from 1270. This was a wooden structure, located on a former Prussian gord, located on a small island in between the waters of the Lake Dwęrcki and the River Drwęca. The castle in Ostróda was at first the headquarters for the Starosta of Ostróda, who was subordinate to the authority of the Komtur of Dzierzgoń. A new stronghold was built between 1350 and 1370. The Komtur of Ostróda Günter von Hohenstein is known for raising the castle in Ostróda and Teutonic Castle in Świecie. In contrast with the castle in Świecie, the Ostróda castle had no towers, which were rare in Teutonic architecture up until the fourteenth century. In 1381, two castle structures existed, a new and old, which were both burned down by Lithuanian Duke Kęstutis.

From a Teutonic scripture: "...castrum Osterode novum cum antiquoplene exustum est" – (the new castle in Ostróda together with the old one was completely burned down).

Getting ready for the new war with the Kingdom of Poland, the castle was surrounded by a moat. The moat was filled with water. The moat was filled in with soil in the eighteenth century. The access point from the east of the castle was by a bascule bridge, which led to a granite gate. The village surrounding the castle served means for keeping storage, brewery and a forge. In the Battle of Grunwald the castle was used to support the defence against the Polish army. The castle became greatly diminished in the nineteenth and twentieth centuries. During World War II the castle was burned down by the Wehrmacht Army. The castle's reconstruction began in 1974. Currently, the castle houses a gallery, library and a museum.
