= Bakshish (band) =

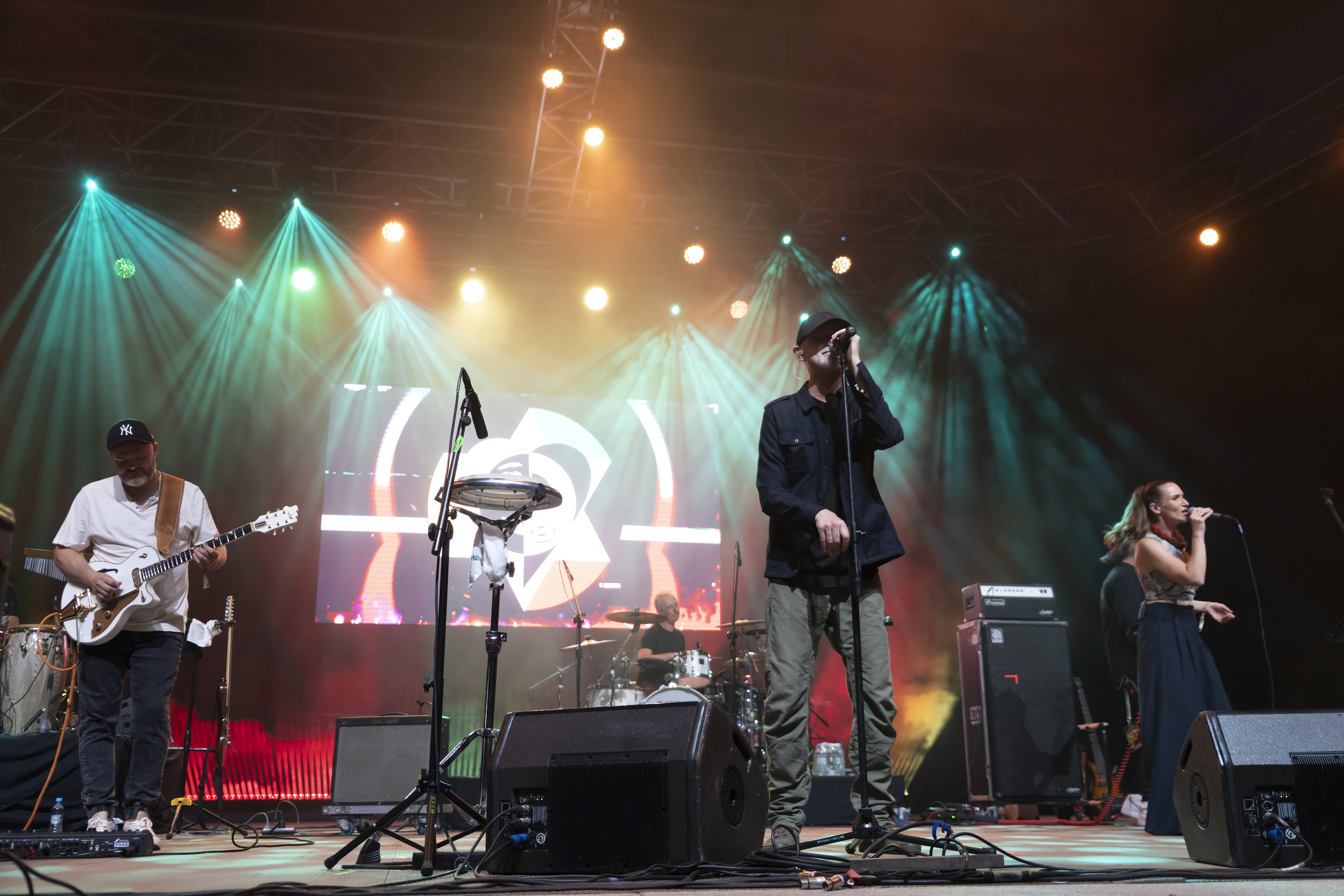
- Bakshish performing at the Ostróda Reggae Festival (2025)

Background information
- Also known as: Bakszysz
- Origin: Kluczbork, Poland
- Genres: Reggae, dub
- Years active: 1982–present
- Website: www.bakshish.pl

Bakshish (also known as Bakszysz) is a Polish reggae band formed in Kluczbork in 1982. The group has been described by Polish Radio as among Poland's early reggae/dub acts.

== History ==
Bakshish was founded in 1982 in Kluczbork by vocalist Jarosław "Jarex" Kowalczyk; until 1994 the band performed under the name Bakszysz before adopting the spelling Bakshish. In its early period, the band's sound was described as situated between punk rock, ska and new wave with emerging reggae elements.

In the first half of the 1980s the group performed at major Polish festivals. It reached the final of Polish Radio Program III's contest Kto najlepszy w tym Rocku? and won an award at the 1983 Jarocin rock festival (contest section); in 1984 it returned to Jarocin as one of the festival's featured acts. The band's track “Czarna droga” appeared on the Polish compilation album Fala (Polton, 1985).

The band documented the 1980s period with a demo recorded at Polish Radio's Opole studio (1989) and a cassette release Open Your Heart, followed by concerts abroad (including Germany in 1991). The debut studio album One Love was released in 1993. In 1994 the band released Eye, produced by Felix Wolter (leader of the German band The Vision).

In 1996 the group significantly reduced its activity due to Kowalczyk's serious illness; during this period he also initiated a techno-dub project Tabu Duby. After returning to regular concert activity, the band recorded the album B 3 in 2000 (promoted by the single “Jak łzy”).

In 2009, Polish media reported the release of the archival double album Back-Szysz – Jeden czas, documenting the band's early years and live recordings from the 1980s and early 1990s.

Polish Radio noted that the band continued releasing new material in later decades, including the album 4 I-ver and subsequent releases/performances; the band's 40th anniversary was marked by the album Ego, premiered at the 2022 Ostróda Reggae Festival.

== Discography ==
=== Studio albums ===
- One Love (1993)
- Eye (1994)
- B 3 (2000)
- 4 I-ver (2012)
- Ego (2022)

=== Archival releases ===
- Back-Szysz – Jeden czas (2009)
