= Danakil (band) =

French reggae band

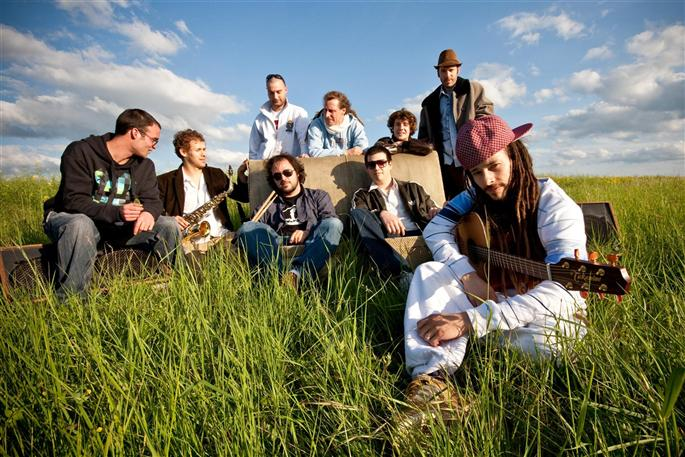
- Danakil

Background information
- Origin: Marly-le-Roi, Île-de-France, France
- Genre: Reggae roots
- Years active: 2000 – present
- Label: Baco Records
- Members: Balik (Guillaume Basile) Das (Mathieu Dassieu); Tom-tom (Thomas Souil); Titi (Thierry Renaud); Massif Boris (Boris Arnoux); Dus (Nicolas Dussere); Fab (Fabien Giroud); Smart (Martin Bisson); Keuj(Jacques Stainton); One (Guillaume Rossignol) Jb (Jean-Baptiste Gerbaux)

Danakil is a French roots reggae band created in 2000 by a group of Parisian college students. The band quickly gained acclaim due to the many concerts and festivals they performed in. The band continues to transmit its message through a music mixing reggae and world music.

== Biography ==
=== Beginnings ===
Danakil is a reggae band started in 2000 by a group of college students studying music at the "Louis de Broglie" university in Marly-le-Roi, near Paris. The name Danakil comes from the Danakil Desert and their love for one of the countries that's located in the desert: Ethiopia.

The band first toured in 2005, following which they sold close to a million demo discs. Their first album, Microclimat, came out on 28 April 2006. It was released under the Essembe Prod label and was distributed by Believe Digital. The success of this album convinced the band to further pursue their musical career. They began getting involved with the production company MusicAction when preparations for a second album started.

In their early years, Danakil performed in many small concerts and bars, helping them expand their fan base. The band then started touring with other musician groups such as Saïan Supa Crew. Their endorsement with MusicAction allowed them to participate in bigger reggae festivals such as the Reggae Sun Ska, the Dour festival, Esperanza, SummerJam and to perform concerts alongside widely known bands such as Groundation.

In 2008, Danakil released their second album, Dialogue de Sourds. The album contained collaborations with Mighty Diamonds, General Levy and Jah Mason.

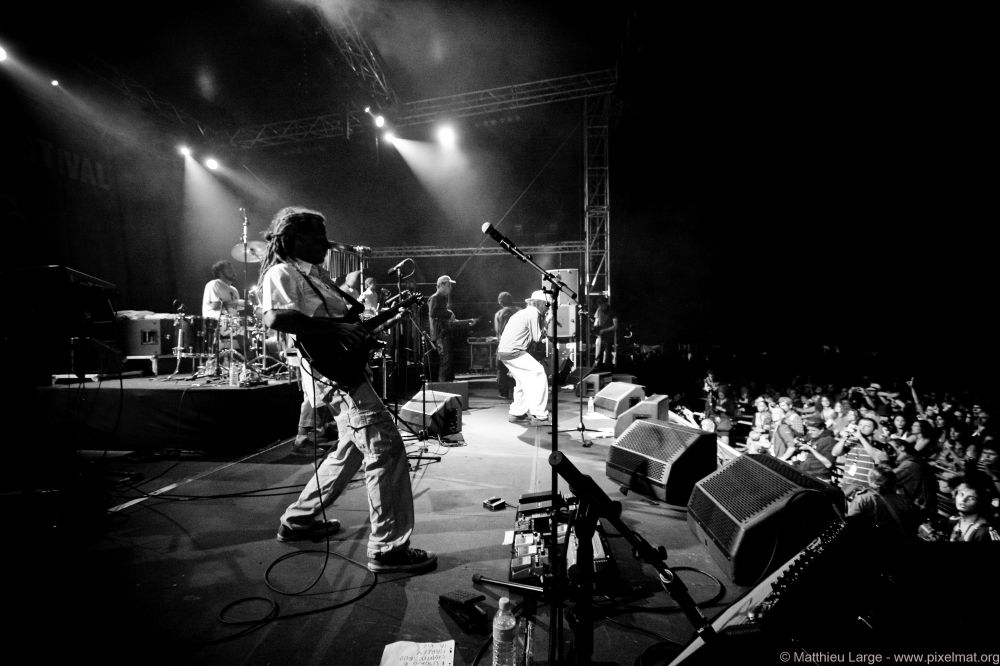
Danakil Reggae sun ska 2009

=== Acclaim in the world of reggae ===
==== 2009–10 ====
In 2009, having performed close to 300 concerts, the band was awarded the Best French Reggae Award at the Web Reggae Awards 2008. Danakil performed in the Olympia music hall in 2009, one of the biggest concerts in the band's history. In this concert, the band also paid tribute to Edith Piaf by performing a reggae version of her song Non, je ne regrette rien. In April 2009, the band released their first live album/DVD, filmed at the Cabaret Sauvage in Paris in November 2008. The DVD contains a live recording of the concert as well as footage of a camera crew that followed the band during their tour. The objective of this bonus footage was to provide fans with a more complete image of the group as well as an opportunity to learn about the individual members' personalities.

The band performed on the main stage for the 2010 Fête de l'Humanité. For their first concert in Africa, Danakil performed in Bamako, Mali, for the 80th anniversary of the coronation of Haile Selassie I along with dub artist Manjul. This first concert outside France led the group to perform in other countries such as Belgium, Switzerland and Canada.

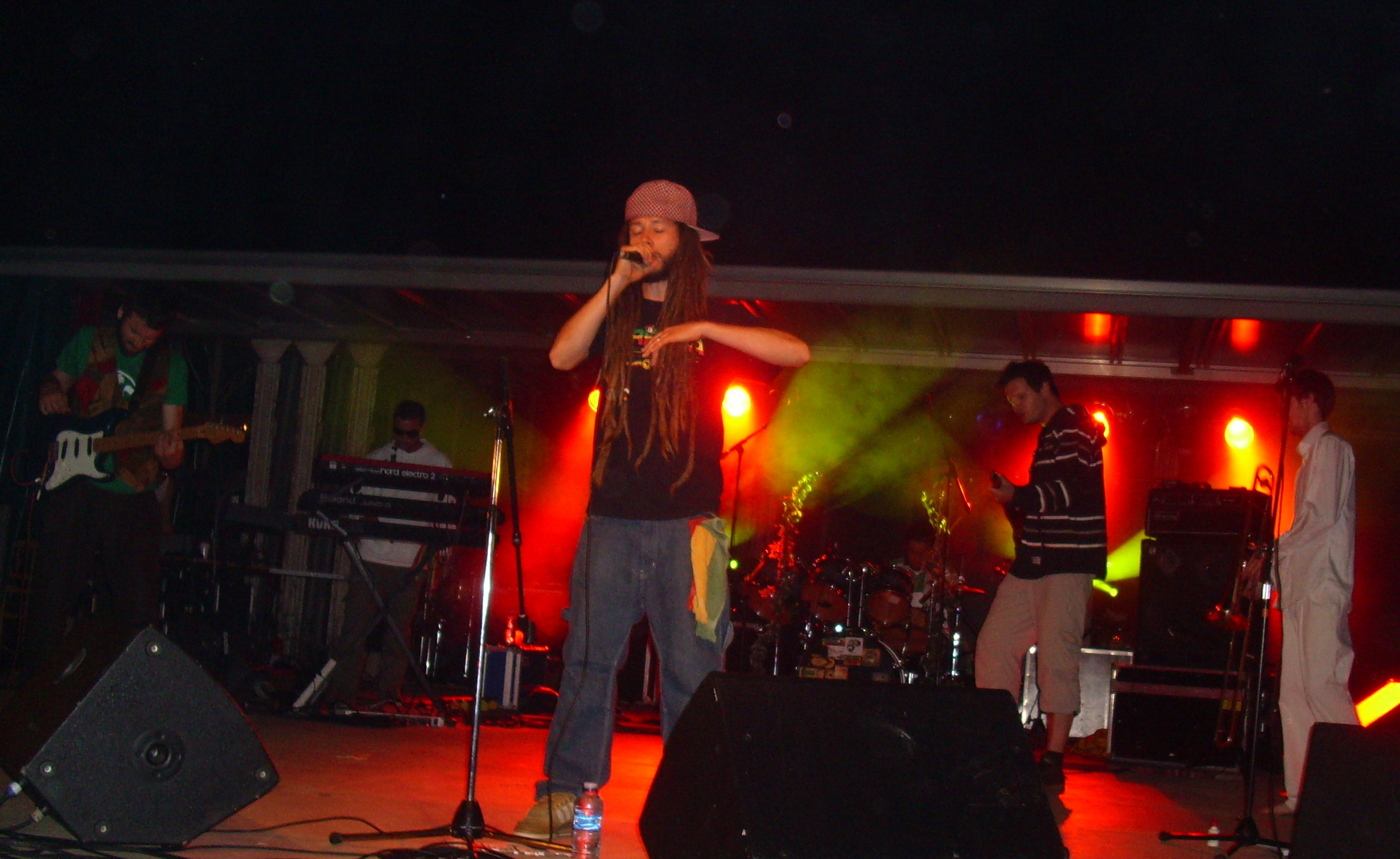
Danakil in the Verjux Saone System festival on 13 June 2009

==== 2011 ====
To promote the release of their third album, Danakil did not use any advertisements or radio announcements, preferring the use of street teams to promote the album. The teams were made of fans who volunteered all over France and who put up posters and flyers advertising the band's album. The band also announced that during the March–April 2011 tour, limited edition copies of the third album would be handed out to attending fans. Balik, the singer of the band, said that this was done to help stop illegal downloading of music and to promote concert attendance.

Recording of the third studio album took place in Paris, Bamako and Kingston. This was a voluntary decision made by the band in the hopes of bringing more foreign sounds into the album.

On 18 March 2011, Danakil performed at the Zénith de Paris alongside other reggae performers such as Winston McAnuff and Brahim, who performed J'Entends Les Cris. The band also performed Non, je ne regrette rien, their tribute song to French singer Edith Piaf.

As a celebration for their 10th active year as a band, Danakil add a new video to their Sur la Route collection in March 2011.

On 26 November 2011 the band performed in the 2011 Fête de l'Humanité as the main event.

The band performed in the Paléo Festival in Nyon alongside artists such as Stromae and Soprano.

==== 2012–16 ====
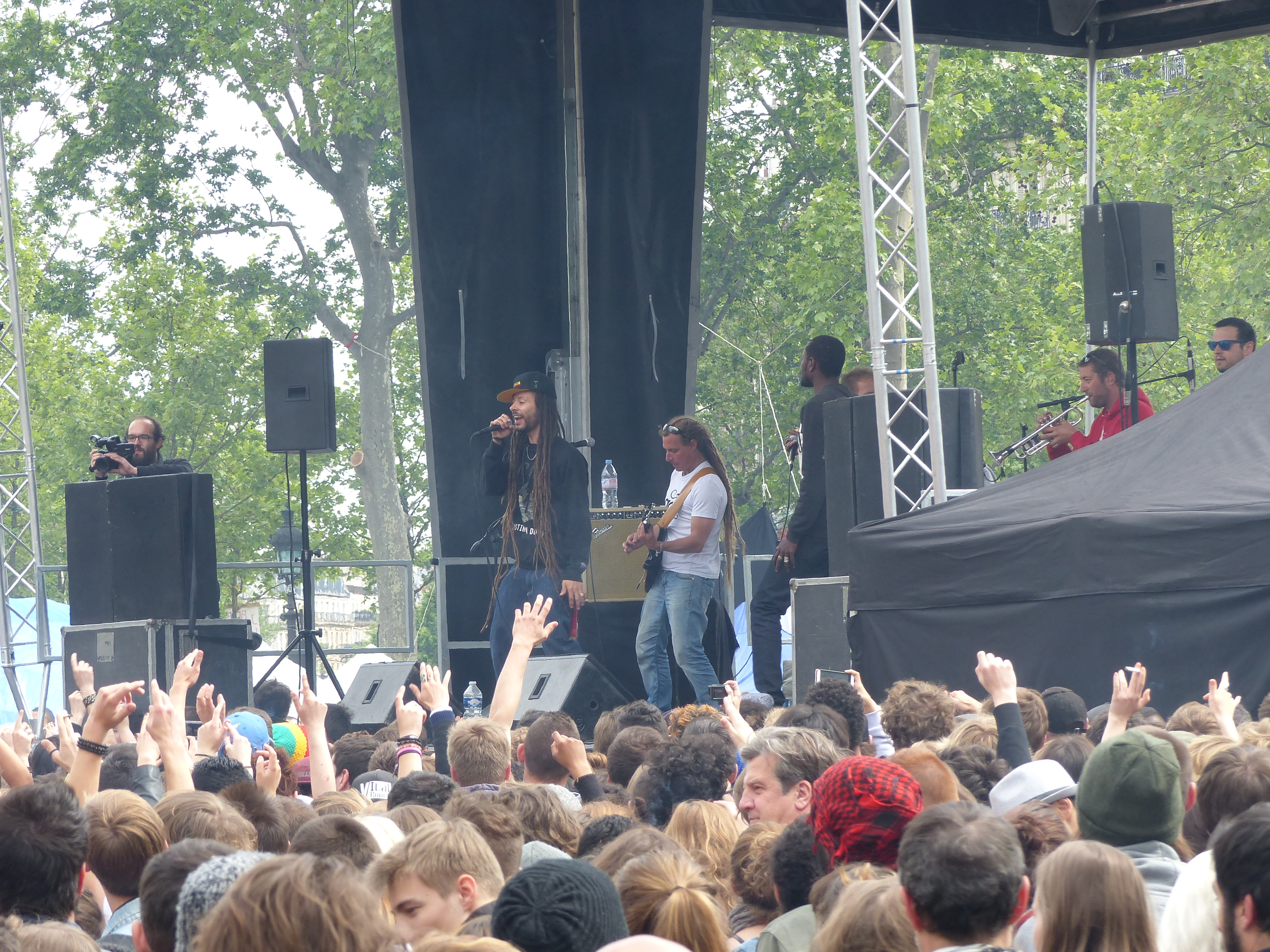
Place de la République - 2016.05.15

In February 2012, the band won the Best French Reggae Album award at the 2012 Reggae Victory Awards. In June 2012, the band released their first Dub album, Echos du Dub, which contains dub versions of some songs from Echos du Temps produced by Manjul. The band performed in the Solidays concerts, a music festival that raises awareness on AIDS, on 23 June 2012. Around this time period, the band's success despite their unpopularity with the media becomes a part of the band's image. On 1 October 2012 the band released a live CD and DVD of their March concert at the Cigale music hall.

In February 2013, the band won the Best French Reggae Album award from Echos du Dub and Best Live Album award for Live on Air a la Cigale at the 2013 Reggae Victory Awards.

In February 2014, Danakil released a new album entitled Entre les lines. Four singles were released from this album: Le Rêve, Ne Touche Pas, Mali Mali, and L'Or Noir.

In 2016, the band announces a new album La Rue Raisonne, and a new tour.

== Musical style ==
Danakil songs often have very clear humanistic lyrics; singer Balik finds inspiration in current events.

Some commonly cited themes in Danakil songs include North-South inequalities, difficulties in Africa, the hypocrisy of politicians, environmental problems, the freedom of people and more generally the problems of a consumerist society. In their songs, Danakil offer the idea of a Utopian world where libertarianism is valued that contrasts with our present world. Danakil has also talked about more gentle and light themes such as love, passing time and the desire to travel and discover the world.

The band has cited Mighty Diamonds, Israel Vibration, Third World, Don Carlos, Steel Pulse, Brahim and others as their artistic influences.

== Members ==
- Balik - Vocals, Composition
- Das - Saxophone
- Tom-Tom - Trumpet
- Big Keuj - Trombone
- Massif-Boris - Bass
- Papa Dus - Guitar
- Fab - Guitar
- Titi - Drums
- Smarties - Keyboard
- One or Manjul - Percussions

== Discography ==
=== Albums ===
Year	Album	Peak positions	
Year	Album	FRA	BEL (Wa)
2006	Micro-Climat	–	–
2008	Dialogue de Sourds	143	–
2011	Échos du Temps	50	–
2012	Échos du Dub	–	–
2014	Entre les lignes	27	139
2016	La rue raisonne	90	144
2021	Rien Ne Se Tait	93	

Live albums

Year	Album	Peak positions
Year	Album	FR
2009	Live au Cabaret Sauvage	189
2012	On Air a la Cigale	130

=== Singles ===
- "Non je ne regrette rien" (2010)
