= Mam talent! series 5 =

Mam talent!
- Series 5
- Hosted by: Marcin Prokop; Szymon Hołownia
- Judges: Małgorzata Foremniak; Robert Kozyra; Agnieszka Chylińska
- Winner: Delfina & Bartek
- Runner-up: Pitzo & Polssky

Release
- Original network: TVN
- Original release: 1 September – 24 November 2012

Series chronology
- ← Previous; Series 4 Next → Series 6

The fifth series of Mam talent! began airing on TVN on 1 September 2012 and ended on 24 November 2012. All three judges from the previous series: Agnieszka Chylińska, Małgorzata Foremniak and Robert Kozyra returned to judge the contestants. Marcin Prokop and Szymon Hołownia present the show again. The series was won by acrobatic duo Delfina & Bartek, with dancing duo Pitzo & Polssky coming second. Acrobat Anna Filipowska came third.

== Auditions ==
Cities where live theatre auditions were held.

The pre-auditions took place in Poznań, Zabrze, Wrocław, Szczecin, Lublin, Rzeszów, Warsaw and Gdańsk from the beginning of April 2012 starting in Poznań and ending in Gdańsk in June 2012. These were to be followed by judges' auditions held in theatres in Katowice, Wrocław, Gdańsk, Warsaw and Kraków between 18 June and 15 July 2012.

Auditionees could also send a video of their performance via Mam talent! website instead of participating in pre-audition.

City	Venue	Pre-audition	Audition
Poznań	Hotel Andersia	1 April 2012	—
Zabrze	House of Music and Dance	13 April 2012	—
Wrocław	Hotel Mercure Panorama (pre-audition); Wrocław Opera (audition)	15 April 2012	25–26 June 2012
Szczecin	Community Centre Słowianin	11 May 2012	—
Lublin	Hotel Europa	19 May 2012	—
Rzeszów	Maska Theatre	26 May 2012	—
Warsaw	Primate's Palace (pre-audition); Dramatic Theatre (audition)	10 June 2012	13–14 July 2012
Gdańsk	Baltic Philharmonic (pre-audition); Wybrzeże Theatre (audition)	12 June 2012	1–2 July 2012
Katowice	Silesian Theatre	—	18–19 June 2012
Kraków	Juliusz Słowacki Theatre	—	7–8 July 2012

== Semi-finals ==
The live shows began on 20 October 2012.

Each show featured a guest performance. Runner-up of the first series Klaudia Kulawik performed on the first show while runner-up of the third series Kamil Bednarek performed on the second. The third featured another finalist of the third series Sabina Jeszka and the fourth featured the series 4 runner-up Piotr Karpienia. Finalists of the first series AudioFeels performed on the fifth show.

=== Semi-finalists ===
Key	Winner	Runner-up	Finalist	Semi-finalist (lost judges' vote)

Name of act	Age(s)	Genre	Act	From	Semi	Position reached
Agata Dziarmagowska	16	Singing	Singer	Częstochowa	2	Semi-finalist
Aleksandra Borak	19	Singing	Singer	Poznań	1	Semi-finalist
Aleksandra Kuśmider	17	Singing	Singer	Zarzecze	5	Semi-finalist
Anna Filipowska	25	Acrobatics	Acrobat	Katowice	5	Finalist
Anna Polowczyk	33	Singing	Singer	Poznań	5	Semi-finalist (lost judges' vote)
Bartek Grzanek	36	Singing	Singer	Aleksandrów Łódzki	2	Finalist
Betty Q	26	Performing	Burlesque act	Warsaw	3	Semi-finalist
Break Box	22	Music/Dancing	Beatboxer and breakdancer duo	Warsaw	1	Semi-finalist
Dawid Bryniarski	23	Dancing	Dancer	Nowy Targ	2	Semi-finalist (lost judges' vote)
Dawid Rajfur	21	Singing	Singer	Wrocław	3	Semi-finalist
Delfina & Bartek	19	Acrobatics	Acrobatic duo	Rzeszów	3	Winner
Drumbastic	18-30	Music	Drummers	Warsaw	5	Semi-finalist
Duet Elita	8, 9	Dancing	Dancing duo	Kraków	3	Finalist
Fundacja Ocelot	18-24	Acrobatics	Acrobatic group	Złotoryja	4	Semi-finalist
Gwardia Gryfa	19-26	Dancing	Dance troupe	Wrocław	1	Semi-finalist
Jumpstyle Gdańsk	14-18	Dancing	Dance troupe	Gdańsk, Kościerzyna, Łubiana, Sierakowice	2	Semi-finalist
Karolina Banaszek	28	Acrobatics	Acrobat	Warsaw	2	Semi-finalist
Kinga Skiba	8	Singing	Singer	Lubsza	4	Finalist
Maciej Astramowicz	29	Acrobatics	Acrobat	Wrocław	5	Semi-finalist
Maciej Dzięgielewski	21	Magic	Illusionist	Rumia	3	Semi-finalist
Magdalena Gawara	29	Gymnastics	Art gymnastic act	Kraków	4	Semi-finalist
Maja Koman	24	Singing	Singer	Poznań	4	Semi-finalist
Marcin Dudycz	18	Dancing	Dancer	Humniska	4	Semi-finalist (lost judges' vote)
Marcin Kowalczyk	20	Miscellaneous	Rubik's Cube tricks act	Grudziądz	4	Finalist
Marcin Tylkowski	26	Acrobatics	Acrobat	Koczargi Stare	1	Semi-finalist
Michał Ostrowski	26	Miscellaneous	Footbag tricks act	Strzelin	5	Semi-finalist
Michał Zator	26	Music	Harpist	Kamionki	1	Semi-finalist
Mieszko Włodarczyk	19	Gymnastics	Basketball tricks act	Okonek	1	Semi-finalist (lost judges' vote)
Multivisual	24-29	Performing	Illusionists	Rzeszów, Warsaw, Gdańsk	2	Finalist
Patryk Rybarski	28	Performing	Pole dancer	Warsaw	3	Semi-finalist (lost judges' vote)
Paweł Stępień	21	Music	Flautist	Kozy	4	Semi-finalist
Pitzo & Polssky	24, 32	Dancing	Dancing duo	Lublin	5	Runner-Up
Recycling Band	21-23	Music	Orchestra	Kraków	1	Finalist
Red Heels	21-25	Music	String quartet	Katowice	2	Semi-finalist
Taekwondo Rapid Śrem	23-32	Acrobatics	Martial artists	Śrem, Manieczki, Grabianowo	2	Semi-finalist
Tess	16-27	Dancing	Dance troupe	Tarnowskie Góry	5	Semi-finalist
The Swing Alliance	23-30	Dancing	Dance troupe	Warsaw	4	Semi-finalist
Trio ETC Rzeszów	15-19	Acrobatics	Acrobats	Rzeszów	1	Finalist
Volare	25-30	Music	Musical band	Brzeg	3	Semi-finalist
Zaklepotani	21-26	Dancing	Dance troupe	Gdańsk	3	Semi-finalist

=== Semi-finals summary ===
Key	Judges' choice	Won the public vote	Won the judges' vote	Lost the judges' vote

==== Semi-final 1 (20 October) ====
- Guest performers: Klaudia Kulawik - "Only Hope"

Artist	Order	Act	Buzzes and judges' choices	Finished	Result		
Chylińska	Kozyra	Foremniak					
Gwardia Gryfa	1	Dance troupe				Unknown	Eliminated
Recycling Band	2	Orchestra				Unknown	Top 3 (Won judges vote)
Break Box	3	Beatboxer and breakdancer duo				Unknown	Eliminated
Michał Zator	4	Harpist				Unknown	Eliminated
Marcin Tylkowski	5	Acrobat				Unknown	Eliminated
Mieszko Włodarczyk	6	Basketball tricks act				Unknown	Top 3 (Lost judges vote)
Aleksandra Borak	7	Singer				Unknown	Eliminated
Trio ETC Rzeszów	8	Acrobats				1st	1st (Won public vote)

==== Semi-final 2 (27 October) ====
- Guest performers: Kamil Bednarek - "Think About Tomorrow"

Artist	Order	Act	Buzzes and judges' choices	Finished	Result		
Chylińska	Kozyra	Foremniak					
Taekwondo Rapid Śrem	1	Martial artists				Unknown	Eliminated
Jumpstyle Team	2	Dance troupe				Unknown	Eliminated
Agata Dziarmagowska	3	Singer				Unknown	Eliminated
Red Heels	4	String quartet				Unknown	Eliminated
Karolina Banaszek	5	Dancer / Acrobat				Unknown	Eliminated
Dawid Bryniarski	6	Dancer				Unknown	Top 3 (Lost judges vote)
Bartek Grzanek	7	Singer				Unknown	Top 3 (Won judges vote)
Multivisual	8	Illusionists				1st	1st (Won public vote)

==== Semi-final 3 (3 November) ====
- Guest performers: Sabina Jeszka - "Good Times"

Artist	Order	Act	Buzzes and judges' choices	Finished	Result		
Chylińska	Kozyra	Foremniak					
Zaklepotani	1	Dance troupe				Unknown	Eliminated
Volare	2	Musical band				Unknown	Eliminated
Maciej Dzięgielewski	3	Illusionist				Unknown	Eliminated
Betty Q	4	Burlesque act				Unknown	Eliminated
Patryk Rybarski	5	Pole dancer				Unknown	Top 3 (Lost judges vote)
Duet Elita	6	Dancing duo				1st	1st (Won public vote)
Dawid Rajfur	7	Singer				Unknown	Eliminated
Delfina & Bartek	8	Acrobatic duo				Unknown	Top 3 (Won judges vote)

==== Semi-final 4 (10 November) ====
- Guest performers: Piotr Karpienia - "Świat Za Lustrem"

Artist	Order	Act	Buzzes and judges' choices	Finished	Result		
Chylińska	Kozyra	Foremniak					
The Swing Alliance	1	Dance troupe				Unknown	Eliminated
Paweł Stępień	2	Flautist				Unknown	Eliminated
Kinga Skiba	3	Singer				1st	1st (Won public vote)
Magdalena Gawara	4	Art gymnastic act				Unknown	Eliminated
Fundacja Ocelot	5	Acrobatic group				Unknown	Eliminated
Marcin Dudycz	6	Dancer				Unknown	Top 3 (Lost judges vote)
Marcin Kowalczyk	7	Rubik's Cube tricks act				Unknown	Top 3 (Won judges vote)
Maja Koman	8	Singer				Unknown	Eliminated

==== Semi-final 5 (17 November) ====
- Guest performers: AudioFeels - "What does it mean?"

Artist	Order	Act	Buzzes and judges' choices	Finished	Result		
Chylińska	Kozyra	Foremniak					
Drumbastic	1	Drummers				Unknown	Eliminated
Tess	2	Dance troupe				Unknown	Eliminated
Michał Ostrowski	3	Footbag tricks act				Unknown	Eliminated
Aleksandra Kuśmider	4	Singer				Unknown	Eliminated
Maciej Astramowicz	5	Acrobat				Unknown	Eliminated
Pitzo & Polssky	6	Dancing duo				Unknown	Top 3 (Won judges vote)
Anna Polowczyk	7	Singer				Unknown	Top 3 (Lost judges vote)
Anna Filipowska	8	Acrobat				1st	1st (Won public vote)

== Final (24 November 2012) ==
- Guest performer: Ewelina Lisowska - "Nieodporny rozum"

Key	Winner	Runner-up

Artist	Order	Act	Finished
Recycling Band	1	Orchestra	Unknown
Marcin Kowalczyk	2	Rubik's Cube tricks act	Unknown
Kinga Skiba	3	Singer	Unknown
Delfina & Bartek	4	Acrobatic duo	1st
Duet Elita	5	Dancing duo	Unknown
Bartek Grzanek	6	Singer	Unknown
Multivisual	7	Illusionists	Unknown
Trio ETC Rzeszów	8	Acrobats	Unknown
Pitzo & Polssky	9	Dancing duo	2nd
Anna Filipowska	10	Acrobat	3rd

== Live show chart ==
Legend
Winner	Runner-up

Won Semi Final	Judges' Choice	Top 3 (Eliminated)	Eliminated

Show	Contestant	Result					
Show	Contestant	SF 1	SF 2	SF 3	SF 4	SF 5	Final
Final	Delfina & Bartek			JC			1st
Final	Pitzo & Polssky					JC	2nd
Final	Anna Filipowska					Win	ELIM
Final	Recycling Band	JC					ELIM
Final	Marcin Kowalczyk				JC		ELIM
Final	Kinga Skiba				Win		ELIM
Final	Duet Elita			Win			ELIM
Final	Bartek Grzanek		JC				ELIM
Final	Multivisual		Win				ELIM
Final	Trio ETC Rzeszów	Win					ELIM
Semi; Final 5
Semi; Final 5	Anna Polowczyk					Top 3	
Semi; Final 5	Drumbastic					ELIM	
Semi; Final 5	Tess					ELIM	
Semi; Final 5	Michał Ostrowski					ELIM	
Semi; Final 5	Aleksandra Kuśmider					ELIM	
Semi; Final 5	Maciej Astramowicz					ELIM	
Semi; Final 4	Marcin Dudycz				Top 3		
Semi; Final 4	The Swing Alliance				ELIM		
Semi; Final 4	Paweł Stępień				ELIM		
Semi; Final 4	Magdalena Gawara				ELIM		
Semi; Final 4	Fundacja Ocelot				ELIM		
Semi; Final 4	Maja Koman				ELIM		
Semi; Final 3	Patryk Rybarski			Top 3			
Semi; Final 3	Zaklepotani			ELIM			
Semi; Final 3	Volare			ELIM			
Semi; Final 3	Maciej Dzięgielewski			ELIM			
Semi; Final 3	Betty Q			ELIM			
Semi; Final 3	Dawid Rajfur			ELIM			
Semi; Final 2	Dawid Bryniarski		Top 3				
Semi; Final 2	Taekwondo Rapid Śrem		ELIM				
Semi; Final 2	Jumpstyle Team		ELIM				
Semi; Final 2	Agata Dziarmagowska		ELIM				
Semi; Final 2	Red Heels		ELIM				
Semi; Final 2	Karolina Banaszek		ELIM				
Semi; Final 1	Mieszko Włodarczyk	Top 3					
Semi; Final 1	Gwardia Gryfa	ELIM					
Semi; Final 1	Break Box	ELIM					
Semi; Final 1	Michał Zator	ELIM					
Semi; Final 1	Marcin Tylkowski	ELIM					
Semi; Final 1	Aleksandra Borak	ELIM					

== Ratings ==
Episode	Date	Official rating (millions)	Weekly rank	Share (%)	Share 16-49 (%)	Source(s)
Auditions 1	1 September	3.34	7	25.9	31.3	
Auditions 2	8 September	3.28	11	23.5	28.8	
Auditions 3	15 September	3.60	9	25.5	30.4	
Auditions 4	22 September	4.25	8	27.6	31.4	
Auditions 5	29 September	4.33	8	29.5	37.6	
Auditions 6	6 October	4.11	9	27.7	31.1	
Auditions 7	13 October	4.65	5	29.9	35.2	
Semi-final 1	20 October	4.30	10	28.9	33.0	
Semi-final 2	27 October	3.90	9	25.4	29.9	
Semi-final 3	3 November	4.25	9	27.5	31.0	
Semi-final 4	10 November	3.83	10	25.4	28.7	
Semi-final 5	17 November	4.03	10	25.8	27.8	
Live final	24 November	4.50	8	28.7	31.9	
Series average	2012	3.98	N/A	27.1	31.3	
