= Piotr Karpienia =

Polish singer-songwriter (born 1979)

- Born: Piotr Karpienia; 1979 (age 46–47); Białystok, Poland
- Origin: Ełk, Poland
- Occupation: Singer-songwriter
- Instruments: Vocals, guitar
- Years active: 1999–present
- Label: Sony Music Entertainment Poland
- Website: piotrkarpienia.com

Piotr Karpienia (born 1979) is a Polish singer-songwriter who rose to fame after being the runner-up on the fourth series of Poland's Got Talent. He is currently signed to Warner Music Poland. His debut album titled Mój świat was released on 15 May 2012.

== Music career ==
=== 2011: Poland's Got Talent ===
In 2011 Karpienia auditioned for the fourth series of television series Poland's Got Talent. In front of the judges and live audience, he performed "Use Somebody" by Kings of Leon. He received positive comments from the judges, Agnieszka Chylińska, Małgorzata Foremniak and Robert Kozyra. Kozyra said that he had sung "better than Kings of Leon". He received three yeses and was put through to the next round, and through to the live semi-finals.

Karpienia performed for a second time in the semi-final on 12 November 2011, singing "Desire" by U2. He once again received positive comments from the judges. Piotr received the highest number of votes on the night and was put through to the final.

In the final, he performed "Kiss from a Rose" by Seal. He once again received positive comments from all three judges, with judge Robert Kozyra saying it was "the best performance of the night". Later, he lost the final to Kacper Sikora and finished as the runner-up.

=== 2012–present: debut album ===
Soon after the final of Poland's Got Talent it was announced that Karpienia had signed a record deal with Sony Music. His debut album titled Mój świat (meaning My world in English) is set to be released on 15 May 2012. The album will be promoted with his debut single, "Zagubiona".

== Discography ==
Title	Album details	Peak chart positions
Mój Świat	Released: 15 May 2012; Label: Sony Music; Formats: CD, digital download	30
"—" denotes releases that did not chart or were not released
