= Mam talent! series 4 =

Mam talent!
- Series 4
- Hosted by: Marcin Prokop; Szymon Hołownia
- Judges: Małgorzata Foremniak; Robert Kozyra; Agnieszka Chylińska
- Winner: Kacper Sikora
- Runner-up: Piotr Karpienia

Release
- Original network: TVN
- Original release: 3 September – 26 November 2011

Series chronology
- ← Previous; Series 3 Next → Series 5

The fourth series of Mam talent! began airing on TVN on 3 September 2011 and ended on 26 November 2011. The winner of the show was Kacper Sikora, who received PLN 300,000. Małgorzata Foremniak and Agnieszka Chylińska returned as judges. They were joined by a new judge, Robert Kozyra. He replaced Kuba Wojewódzki, who had left the show in order to focus on judging X Factor. Marcin Prokop and Szymon Hołownia returned as hosts.

== Judges ==
Mam talent! judges: (from left) Małgorzata Foremniak, Robert Kozyra and Agnieszka Chylińska during filming the auditions in Katowice on 14 June 2011

It was reported that Kuba Wojewódzki might leave the programme in order to focus on X Factor, where he also serves as a judge and does not want to be present on both shows. Media speculated that Robert Kozyra, former executive of Radio ZET, was in the running for his place on the show. Finally Kozyra was officially confirmed as judge on 7 June 2011. On 22 April 2011 Dziennik reported that Małgorzata Foremniak would return as a judge for the fourth series. Later, it was also reported that Agnieszka Chylińska would return as her maternity leave was going to end soon. She was to have signed her contract right after Easter.

== Auditions ==
The auditions for the fourth series took place in eight Polish cities, beginning from Zabrze on 2 April. Then, it was followed by filmed auditions with judges and audience in Katowice, Wrocław, Gdańsk, Kraków and Warsaw between 13 June and 11 July 2011. Kraków hosted auditions for the first time in show's history.

For the first time the participants could sign up for an audition via Plejada.pl websites application form at plejada.pl/gottalent.html.

City	Venue	Pre-audition	Audition
Zabrze	House of Music and Dance	2–3 April 2011	—
Wrocław	Hotel Mercure Panorama (pre-audition); Wrocław Opera (audition)	8 April 2011	20–21 June 2011
Poznań	Apollo Theatre	10 April 2011	—
Warsaw	Primate's Palace (pre-audition); Dramatic Theatre (audition)	16–17 April 2011	10–11 July 2011
Gdańsk	Baltic Philharmonic (pre-audition); Wybrzeże Theatre (audition)	10 May 2011	27–28 June 2011
Szczecin	Community Centre Słowianin	21 May 2011	—
Rzeszów	Maska Theatre	27 May 2011	—
Lublin	Hotel Europa	29 May 2011	—
Kraków	Juliusz Słowacki Theatre	—	5–6 July 2011
Katowice	Silesian Theatre	—	13–14 June 2011

== Semi-finals ==
The forty semi-finalists were revealed on 15 October 2011. The live shows started on Saturday 22 October.

=== Semi-finalists ===
Key	Winner	Runner-up	Finalist	Semi-finalist (lost judges' vote)

Name of act	Age(s)	Genre	Act	From	Semi	Position reached
Anna Dudek	24	Singing	Singer	Jabłonka Orawska	1	Finalist
Beata Rozmanowska	43	Dancing	Tap dancer	Warsaw	3	Semi-finalist (lost judges' vote)
Black Devils	20	Acrobatics	Extreme martial artists	Elbląg, Gdynia	4	Semi-finalist
Daria Zawiałow	18	Singing	Singer	Warsaw	1	Semi-finalist (lost judges' vote)
Dawid Ciesielski	23	Music	Saxophonist	Łódź	5	Semi-finalist
DPS Kollektiv	19-26	Dancing	Dance troupe	Gdańsk, Gdynia, Poznań	5	Semi-finalist
Funk Rockass	21-28	Dancing	Breakdancers	Warsaw, Poznań, Włocławek	3	Semi-finalist
HD Dance Studio	16-23	Dancing	Dance troupe	Szczecin, Stargard, Rewal, Gryfino	2	Semi-finalist
Inka Kalachevska	20	Acrobatics	Acrobat	Warsaw	3	Semi-finalist
Jasirah & Shadija	18, 23	Dancing	Oriental dancers	Michałowice	4	Semi-finalist
Jakub Sikora	21	Music	Harmonica player	Tychy	2	Semi-finalist (lost judges' vote)
Jessica Anna Nowak	20	Acrobatics	Acrobat	Wrocław	4	Semi-finalist
Kacper Sikora	19	Singing	Singer	Dźwirzyno	5	Winner
Kamil Skicki	25	Music	Violinist	Kraków	1	Semi-finalist
Kinga Hornik	13	Singing	Singer	Gdańsk	5	Semi-finalist
Krzysztof Riewold	17	Miscellaneous	Juggler	Dobrzeń Wielki	5	Semi-finalist (lost judges' vote)
Kuba Jaźwiecki	25	Music	Singer / guitarist	Kraków	5	Semi-finalist
Kuba Nycz	27	Singing	Singer	Tarnowskie Góry	3	Semi-finalist
Kung Fu Dynamics	13, 20	Acrobatics	Martial artists	London	1	Semi-finalist
Lena Romul	21	Music	Singer / saxophonist	Warsaw	2	Finalist
Maciej Sikorski	21	Comedy	Impressionist	Białystok	1	Semi-finalist
Magdalena Lechowska	31	Singing	Singer	Kraków	2	Semi-finalist
Magdalena Sztencel	30	Acrobatics	Acrobat	Warsaw	2	Semi-finalist
Marcin Muszyński	35	Magic	Magician	Mirków	5	Finalist
Marta Podulka	26	Singing	Singer	Poznań	3	Finalists
Mira Art	24, 30	Acrobatics	Acrobats	Gdynia	1	Finalist
Natalia Baj	19	Singing	Singer	Tarnów	4	Semi-finalist (lost judges' vote)
Nofiltrato	Unknown	Performing	Dance troupe	Planet Nofiltrato	2	Semi-finalist
Olaf Bressa	13	Singing	Singer	Kalisz	2	Finalist
Paulina Bielecka	21	Acrobatics	Extreme martial artist	Szczecin	3	Semi-finalist
Piotr Karpienia	32	Singing	Singer / guitarist	Ełk	4	Runner-Up
Rafał Mulka	35	Magic	Magician	Buczkowice	3	Semi-finalist
Siemianowicka Orkiestra Rozrywkowa	25-52	Music	Orchestra	Siemianowice	4	Semi-finalist
Sound'n'Grace	17-33	Singing	Choir	Warsaw	4	Finalist
Spoko	20-30	Dancing	Dance troupe	Zielona Góra	1	Semi-finalist
Tomasz Nieradzik	29	Dancing	Dancer	Świętochłowice	4	Semi-finalist
Tomasz Piotrowski	23	Performing	Poi performer	Tyczyn	3	Finalist
VIP 54	20-34	Performing	Erotic dancers	Warsaw	1	Semi-finalist
White Slide	20-26	Dancing	Dance troupe	Gdańsk	5	Semi-finalist
Wroclove Saxophone Quartet	20-23	Music	Saxophonists	Wrocław	2	Semi-finalist

=== Semi-finals summary ===
Key	Buzzed out	Judges' choice	Won the public vote	Won the judges' vote	Lost the judges' vote

==== Semi-final 1 (22 October) ====
- Guest performer: Magda Welc - "Nie jesteś sama"

Artist	Order	Act	Buzzes and Judges' votes			Finished	Result
Artist	Order	Act	Foremniak	Kozyra	Chylińska	Finished	Result
Spoko	1	Dance troupe				Unknown	Eliminated
Kung Fu Dynamics	2	Martial artists				Unknown	Eliminated
Maciej Sikorski	3	Impressionist				Unknown	Eliminated
Daria Zawiałow	4	Singer				Unknown	Top 3 (Lost judges vote)
Mira Art	5	Acrobats				1st	1st (Won public vote)
Kamil Skicki	6	Violinist				Unknown	Eliminated
VIP 54	7	Erotic dancers				Unknown	Eliminated
Anna Dudek	8	Singer				Unknown	Top 3 (Won judges vote)

==== Semi-final 2 (29 October) ====
Artist	Order	Act	Buzzes and Judges' votes			Finished	Result
Artist	Order	Act	Foremniak	Kozyra	Chylińska	Finished	Result
HD Dance Studio	1	Dance troupe				Unknown	Eliminated
Magdalena Sztencel	2	Acrobat				Unknown	Eliminated
Jakub Sikora	3	Harmonica player				Unknown	Top 3 (Lost judges vote)
Magdalena Lechowska	4	Singer				Unknown	Eliminated
Wroclove Saxophone Quartet	5	Saxophonists				Unknown	Eliminated
Olaf Bressa	6	Singer				Unknown	Top 3 (Won judges vote)
Nofiltrato	7	Dance troupe				Unknown	Eliminated
Lena Romul	8	Singer/Saxophonist				1st	1st (Won public vote)

==== Semi-final 3 (5 November) ====
Artist	Order	Act	Buzzes and Judges' votes			Finished	Result
Artist	Order	Act	Foremniak	Kozyra	Chylińska	Finished	Result
Tomasz Piotrowski	1	Poi performer				Unknown	Top 3 (Won judges vote)
Funk Rockass	2	Breakdancers				Unknown	Eliminated
Paulina Bielecka	3	Extreme martial artist				Unknown	Eliminated
Kuba Nycz	4	Singer				Unknown	Eliminated
Rafał Mulka	5	Magician				Unknown	Eliminated
Inka Kalachevska	6	Acrobat				Unknown	Eliminated
Beata Rozmanowska	7	Tap dancer				Unknown	Top 3 (Lost judges vote)
Marta Podulka	8	Singer				1st	1st (Won public vote)

==== Semi-final 4 (12 November) ====
Artist	Order	Act	Buzzes and Judges' votes			Finished	Result
Artist	Order	Act	Foremniak	Kozyra	Chylińska	Finished	Result
Siemianowicka Orkiestra Rozrywkowa	1	Orchestra				Unknown	Eliminated
Jessica Anna Nowak	2	Acrobat				Unknown	Eliminated
Tomasz Nieradzik	3	Dancer				Unknown	Eliminated
Natalia Baj	4	Singer				Unknown	Top 3 (Lost judges vote)
Black Devils	5	Extreme martial artists				Unknown	Eliminated
Sound'n'Grace	6	Choir				Unknown	Top 3 (Won judges vote)
Jasirah & Shadija	7	Oriental dancers				Unknown	Eliminated
Piotr Karpienia	8	Singer/Guitarist				1st	1st (Won public vote)

==== Semi-final 5 (19 November) ====
Artist	Order	Act	Buzzes and Judges' votes			Finished	Result
Artist	Order	Act	Foremniak	Kozyra	Chylińska	Finished	Result
DPS Kollektiv	1	Dance troupe				Unknown	Eliminated
Krzysztof Riewold	2	Juggler				Unknown	Top 3 (Lost judges vote)
White Slide	3	Dance troupe				Unknown	Eliminated
Kacper Sikora	4	Singer				1st	1st (Won public vote)
Marcin Muszyński	5	Dancing duo				Unknown	Top 3 (Won judges vote)
Kinga Hornik	6	Singer				Unknown	Eliminated
Dawid Ciesielski	7	Saxophonist				Unknown	Eliminated
Kuba Jaźwiecki	8	Singer/Guitarist				Unknown	Eliminated

== Final (26 November) ==
The live final was held on 26 November 2011. After the viewers' voting, the top three turned out to be Piotr Karpienia, Marta Podulka and Kacper Sikora. Then, it was revealed that Marta Podulka finished third. Finally, Kacper Sikora was announced as the winner and Piotr Karpienia became the runner-up. Sikora received PLN 300,000 and Karpienia was given a special prize - PLN 50,000 funded by the sponsor of Mam talent!, Komputronik.

Key	Winner	Runner-up

Order	Finished	Percentage	Artist	Act
1	Unknown	Unknown	Sound'n'Grace	Choir
2	Unknown	Unknown	Olaf Bressa	Singer
3	Unknown	Unknown	Tomasz Piotrowski	Poi performer
4	Unknown	Unknown	Anna Dudek	Singer
5	Unknown	Unknown	Lena Romul	Singer / saxophonist
6	Unknown	Unknown	Marcin Muszyński	Magician
7	1st	Unknown	Kacper Sikora	Singer
8	Unknown	Unknown	Mira Art	Acrobats
9	3rd	Unknown	Marta Podulkn	Singer
10	2nd	Unknown	Piotr Karpienia	Singer / guitarist

== Live show chart ==
Legend
Winner	Runner-up

Won Semi Final	Judges' Choice	Top 3 (Eliminated)	Eliminated

Show	Contestant	Result					
Show	Contestant	SF 1	SF 2	SF 3	SF 4	SF 5	Final
Final	Kacper Sikora					Win	1st
Final	Piotr Karpienia				Win		2nd
Final	Marta Podulka			Win			ELIM
Final	Mira Art	Win					ELIM
Final	Marcin Muszyński					JC	ELIM
Final	Lena Romul		Win				ELIM
Final	Anna Dudek	JC					ELIM
Final	Tomasz Piotrowski			JC			ELIM
Final	Olaf Bressa		JC				ELIM
Final	Sound'n'Grace				JC		ELIM
Semi; Final 5
Semi; Final 5	Krzysztof Riewold					Top 3	
Semi; Final 5	Kuba Jaźwiecki					ELIM	
Semi; Final 5	Dawid Ciesielski					ELIM	
Semi; Final 5	Kinga Hornik					ELIM	
Semi; Final 5	White Slide					ELIM	
Semi; Final 5	DPS Kollektiv					ELIM	
Semi; Final 4	Natalia Baj				Top 3		
Semi; Final 4	Jasirah & Shadija				ELIM		
Semi; Final 4	Black Devils				ELIM		
Semi; Final 4	Tomasz Nieradzik				ELIM		
Semi; Final 4	Jessica Anna Nowak				ELIM		
Semi; Final 4	Siemianowicka Orkiestra Rozrywkowa				ELIM		
Semi; Final 3	Beata Rozmanowska			Top 3			
Semi; Final 3	Inka Kalachevska			ELIM			
Semi; Final 3	Rafał Mulka			ELIM			
Semi; Final 3	Kuba Nycz			ELIM			
Semi; Final 3	Paulina Bielecka			ELIM			
Semi; Final 3	Funk Rockass			ELIM			
Semi; Final 2	Jakub Sikora		Top 3				
Semi; Final 2	Nofiltrato		ELIM				
Semi; Final 2	Wroclove Saxophone Quartet		ELIM				
Semi; Final 2	Magdalena Lechowska		ELIM				
Semi; Final 2	Magdalena Sztencel		ELIM				
Semi; Final 2	HD Dance Studio		ELIM				
Semi; Final 1	Daria Zawiałow	Top 3					
Semi; Final 1	VIP 54	ELIM					
Semi; Final 1	Kamil Skicki	ELIM					
Semi; Final 1	Maciej Sikorski	ELIM					
Semi; Final 1	Kung Fu Dynamics	ELIM					
Semi; Final 1	Spoko	ELIM					

== Ratings ==
The fourth series of Mam talent! premiered on TVN on Saturday, 3 September at 8 p.m. and competed with the new TVP2 series The Voice of Poland. Najlepszy głos which also debuted at 8 p.m. TVN's show attracted the audience of 3.79 million with the share of 28.99%, while its main rival gained almost 2 million viewers with the share of 15.39%. In group "16-49" Mam talent! reached share of 33.10% and was watched by 1.7 million viewers.

Show	Date	Official rating	Weekly rank	Weekend rank	Share	Share 16-49	Source(s)
Auditions 1	3 September	3.72m	8	5	28.9%	33.1%	
Auditions 2	10 September	3.69m	TBA	5	26.8%	31.4%	
Auditions 3	17 September	3.84m	9	5	28.1%	30.7%	
Auditions 4	24 September	4.69m	4	2	32.3%	35.4%	
Auditions 5	1 October 2011	4.70m	5	TBA	33.4%	38.7%	
Auditions 6	8 October 2011	4.77m	TBA	2	30.0%	37.0%	
Auditions 7	15 October 2011	4.86m	5	2	32.5%	37.4%	
Semi-final 1	22 October 2011	4.45m	8	3	29.7%	33.1%	
Semi-final 2	29 October 2011	4.44m	8	TBA	29.2%	32.3%	
Semi-final 3	5 November 2011	4.73m	7	1	33.2%	33.3%	
Semi-final 4	12 November 2011	4.16m	12	TBA	28.0%	31.5%	
Semi-final 5	19 November 2011	4.27m	10	TBA	28.9%	32.5%	
Final	26 November 2011	3.57m	TBA	TBA	24.1%	24.4%	

Note: All ratings obtained from Nielsen Audience Measurement.
