= Kacper Sikora =

Polish singer (born 1992)

- Born: Kacper Sikora; 7 January 1992 (age 33)
- Origin: Dźwirzyno, Poland
- Genres: Rock
- Occupation: Graphics Designer
- Instruments: Vocals, guitar
- Years active: 2011-unknown

Kacper Sikora (born 7 January 1992) is a Polish singer who won the fourth series of Poland's Got Talent in November 2011. As the winner, he received PLN300,000.

== Music career ==
=== X Factor and Poland's Got Talent ===
Sikora auditioned for X Factor in late 2010 and reached bootcamp. He auditioned for the fourth series of Poland's Got Talent in Gdańsk with "Losing My Religion" by R.E.M., receiving positive comments from the judges, Agnieszka Chylińska, Robert Kozyra and Małgorzata Foremniak. He received three yeses and was put through to the next round, and through to the live semi-finals.

Kacper performed in the fifth semi-final on 19 November 2011, singing "Desert Rose" by Sting. He once again received positive comments from the judges. Sikora received the highest number of votes on the night and was put through to the final.

In the final, Sikora performed "Enjoy The Silence" by Depeche Mode. He once again received positive comments from all three judges. He was announced as the winner and received the main prize, PLN300,000.

Currently he is a teacher in the Netherlands. Teaching the CMGT course at Saxion University of Applied Sciences.

Preceded by Magda Welc	Winner of Poland's Got Talent; 2011	Succeeded by Delfina & Bartek
