= Piotr Lisiecki =

Polish singer and guitarist (born 1993)

- Born: Piotr Lisiecki; 2 March 1993 (age 33); Gdańsk, Poland
- Genres: alternative rock, folk, blues
- Occupation: Singer
- Instruments: Vocals, guitar
- Years active: 2010–present
- Label: EMI Music Poland
- Website: piotrlisiecki.eu

Piotr Lisiecki (born 2 March 1993) is a Polish singer and guitarist who rose to fame after placing third on the third series of Poland's Got Talent. In late 2010, he was signed to EMI Music Poland. His debut album, Rules Changed Up was released on 27 April 2011. One week later, it placed eighth in Polish official sales chart.

== Music career ==
=== Early years and Shyja ===
At the age of eleven, Piotr started to compose music, playing the piano. He started singing at the end of college. Then he studied at music school where he met Joanna Klejnow. They started singing together, making a duet. They performed in pubs until they were noticed by Rafał 'Uhuru' Szyjer who took care of their career. Their duet was named Shyja after Szyjer's second name.

=== 2009–2010: Poland's Got Talent ===
In 2009 Lisiecki and Klejnow applied for an audition on popular television series, Poland's Got Talent. However, they failed to get through to filmed auditions. They returned next year and auditioned in Gdańsk. This time, they made it through to judges' auditions where they performed "Black Horse and the Cherry Tree" by KT Tunstall. They were buzzed out by two judges, Agnieszka Chylińska and Małgorzata Foremniak. The former stated that Lisiecki was technically much better than Klejnow and asked him to perform alone. He sang another song by KT Tunstall, "The Hidden Heart" and "Jolene" by Dolly Parton. After getting three yeses, he got through to the live semi-finals.

Lisiecki performed on the third semi-final on 6 November 2010. He sang "Ain't No Sunshine". This performance gave him the first place in viewers' votes and a place in the finale.

In the show's finale, which took place on 27 November 2010, he sang "Lost" by Anouk. Eventually, he placed third in viewers' votes.

=== 2011–present: Rules Changed Up ===
In late 2010 he signed a record deal with EMI Music. His debut album, Rules Changed Up was released on 27 April 2011. It consists of seven his own songs and three cover versions of songs that he performed on Poland's Got Talent. One week after being released, the album placed eighth in Polish official sales chart.

== Discography ==
Year	Album	Peak
Year	Album	POL
2011	Rules Changed Up: First studio album; Released: 27 April 2011; Label: EMI Music Poland	5

== Awards ==
- 2011: WOW! Music Award
