= Mam talent! =

Polish television series

- Created by: Simon Cowell
- Directed by: Tomasz Motyl (15-); Maciej Sobociński (series 15 live shows); Wojciech Iwański (1-14)
- Presented by: Current; Paulina Krupińska-Karpiel (17–); Jan Pirowski (15–) Former; Marcin Prokop (1–14); Michał Kempa (13–14); Szymon Hołownia (1–12); Agnieszka Woźniak-Starak (15–16)
- Judges: Current; Agnieszka Chylińska (1–); Marcin Prokop (15–); Agustin Egurrola (6–12, 17–); Former; Julia Wieniawa (15–17); Małgorzata Foremniak (1–14); Jan Kliment (13–14); Robert Kozyra (4–5); Kuba Wojewódzki (1–3, 10 Final)
- Country of origin: Poland
- No. of series: 18

Production
- Executive producer: Katarzyna Szałańska
- Production locations: various (auditions); Transcolor Studio, Szeligi (live shows, 2014–2022); Farat Film Studio, Warsaw (live shows, 2008–2013)
- Running time: 80–150 mins
- Production companies: FremantleMedia; Sycotv

Original release
- Network: TVN
- Release: 13 September 2008 – present

Mam talent! (English: I have talent!) is the Polish version of the Got Talent series. The aim of the program is to choose the most talented person from people showing their talents. The winner of the show in the first series got €100,000, from the second to the sixteenth series – 300,000 złotys. In the seventeenth series the prize increased to 1,000,000 złotys. Prizes for people from the second and third place are chosen by producers of the shows. The show is hosted by Paulina Krupińska-Karpiel and Jan Pirowski, and the judges are Agnieszka Chylińska, Marcin Prokop, Agustin Egurrola.

== Qualifications ==
In the autumn, before the preliminaries, there are preliminary castings (without TV broadcasts), which determined the qualification of the participants for the performance in front of the jurors' presentation, the audience and cameras. In the second section, conducted in the summer in Polish cities (in Katowice, Gdańsk, Poznań, Wrocław and Warsaw), about four thousand performers appeared. The jury qualified for the final stage of 130. The jury's decision was made by adjudicating or resolving a negative assessment. To be qualified, you must enter the competition, two jurors must be "yes". If one of the jurors performs, the event is considered unsuccessful, he presses the button, which turns on the red cross (3 crosses mean the end of the performance). 130 people were selected by the 40 who went on to the semi-finals. From the 7th edition, it was changed (as in the English version of the show) to the "golden button". Each juror (or host) during all castings can turn it on once, and the participant automatically went to the semi-final

== Semi-finals ==
Participants in the semi-finals (from the 1st to the 12th edition – five, from the 13th edition – four) present themselves on stage in live programs, in front of the jury in the same composition, TV cameras and the audience. In each, there are eight people/groups (in the 13th edition, 10 people/groups) from the selected "40". The jurors evaluate in the same way as before, but at this stage the decision about the participant's passage to the next phase of the program is made by the viewers by calling or sending an SMS to their favorite. In the 12th edition, viewers could also vote via the website decy.online. The participant who receives the most votes goes to the finals, and from the two participants who, according to the viewers, took second and third place, the jury members vote for their favorite. The person with more votes from the jury also goes to the finals. The Platinum button has been in operation since the 13th edition, thanks to which one person/group selected by the jury during the live semi-finals will go directly to the final. Another novelty is the so-called Wild card, pass to the finals; it will be awarded to the person/group who won the largest number of votes in the viewers' vote among the participants who were eliminated during the jury's overtime in the semi-finals

== Final stage ==
Ten participants take part in the final, two from each semi-final. The evaluation of the performances is the same as in the semi-finals, but the method of determining the winner is different. First, in random order, the names of the groups that took the first three places are read out, then the name of the person who took the third place is given. At the end, the hosts inform the viewers about the winner, to whom they give a check for PLN 300,000 (PLN 100,000 for the runner-up is given after the programme). After the award ceremony, the winner presents his performance again.

== Judges and Hosts ==
Colour key

Host
Judge
Guest judge

Cast member	Series																	
Cast member	1 2008	2 2009	3 2010	4 2011	5 2012	6 2013	7 2014	8 2015	9 2016	10 2017	11 2018	12 2019	13 2021	14 2022	15 2024	16 2025	17 2026	18 2027
Marcin Prokop	●	●	●	●	●	●	●	●	●	●	●	●	●	●	●	●	●	●
Szymon Hołownia	●	●	●	●	●	●	●	●	●	●	●	●						
Michał Kempa													●	●				
Jan Pirowski															●	●	●	●
Agnieszka Woźniak-Starak															●	●		
Paulina Krupińska-Karpiel																	●	●
Agnieszka Chylińska	●	●	●	●	●	●	●	●	●	●	●	●	●	●	●	●	●	●
Małgorzata Foremniak	●	●	●	●	●	●	●	●	●	●	●	●	●	●				
Kuba Wojewódzki	●	●	●							●								
Robert Kozyra				●	●													
Agustin Egurrola						●	●	●	●	●	●	●					●	●
Jan Kliment													●	●				
Julia Wieniawa															●	●	●	

== Gallery ==
Current judges

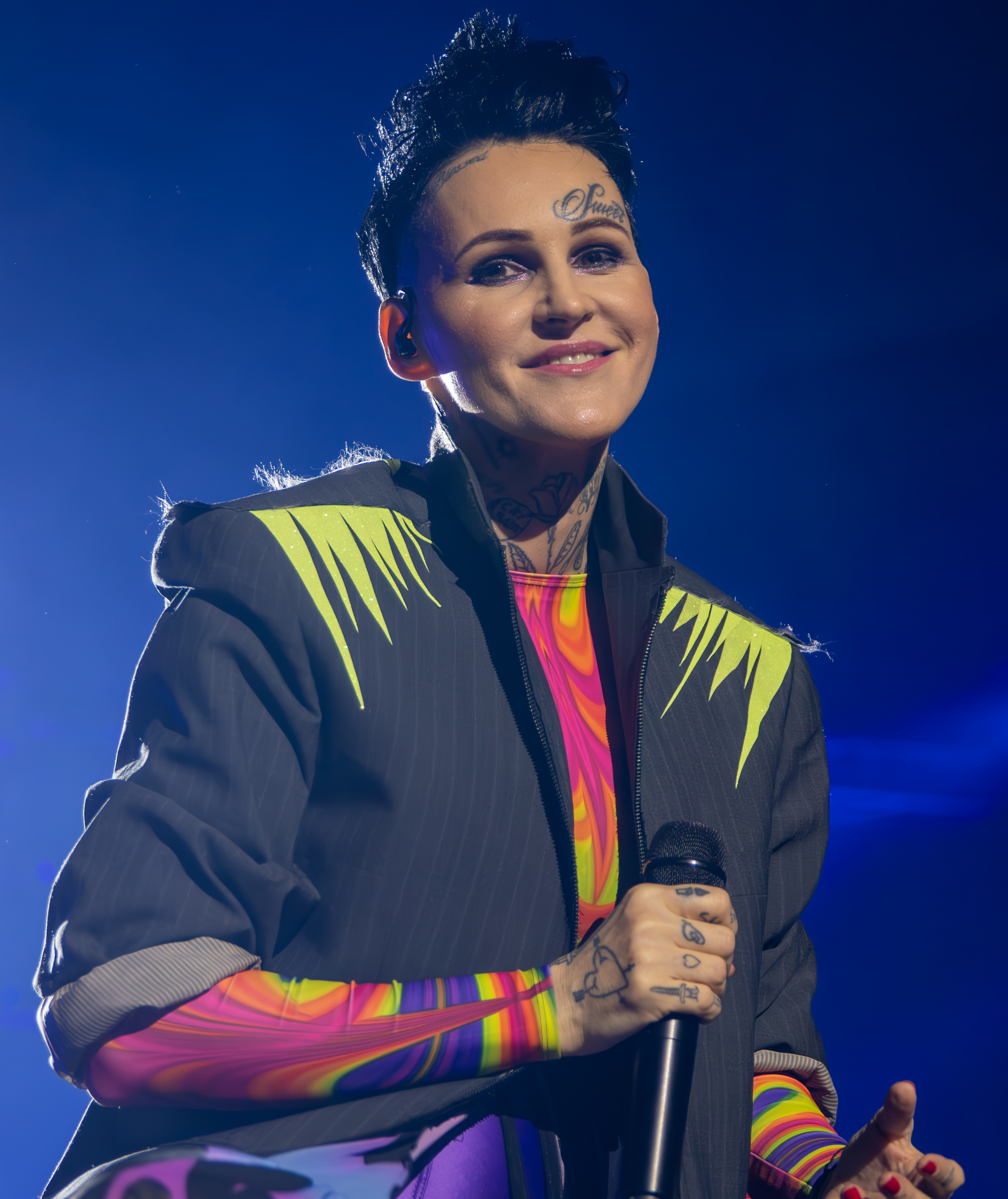
Agnieszka Chylińska
(2008–present)

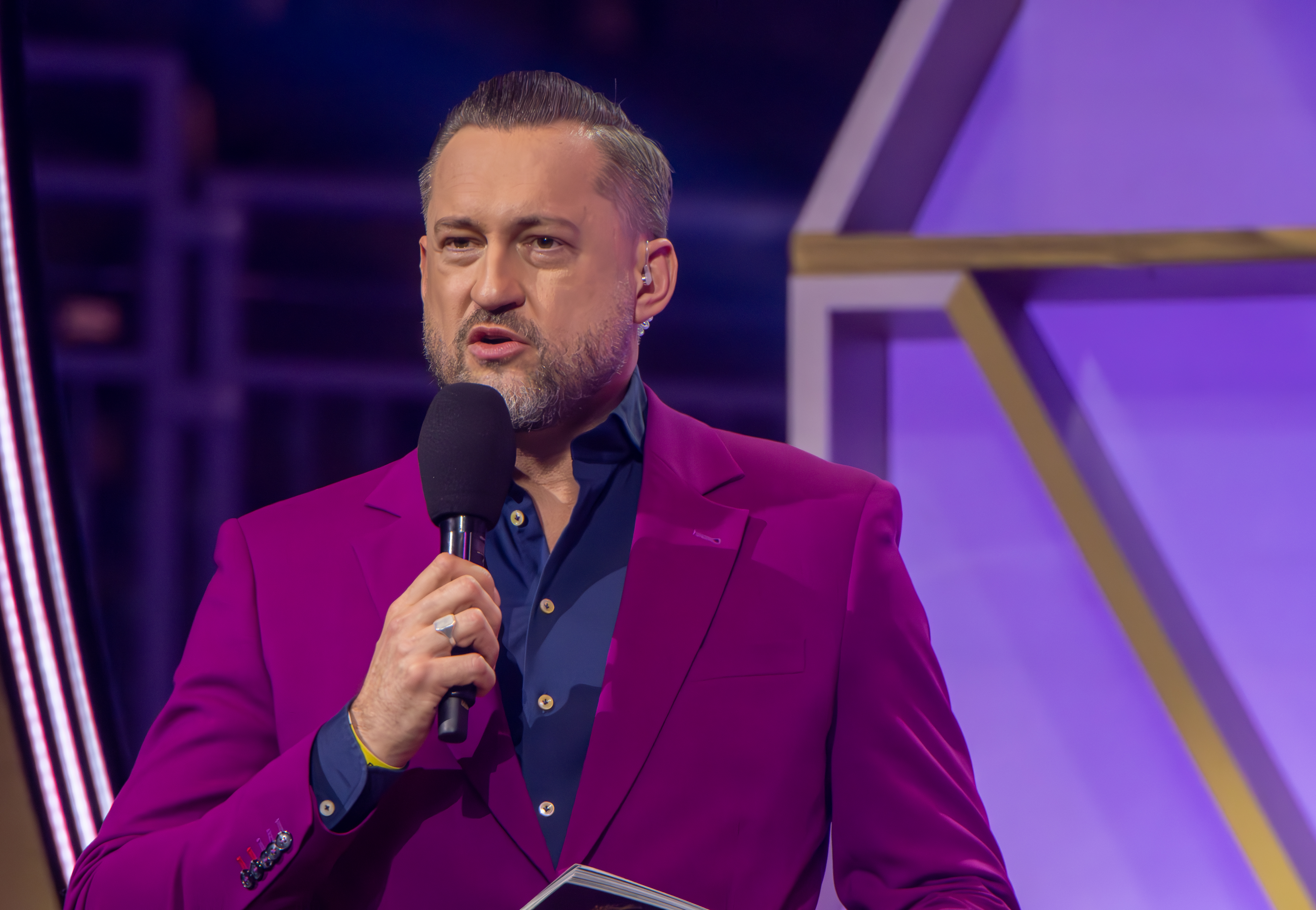
Marcin Prokop
(2024–present)

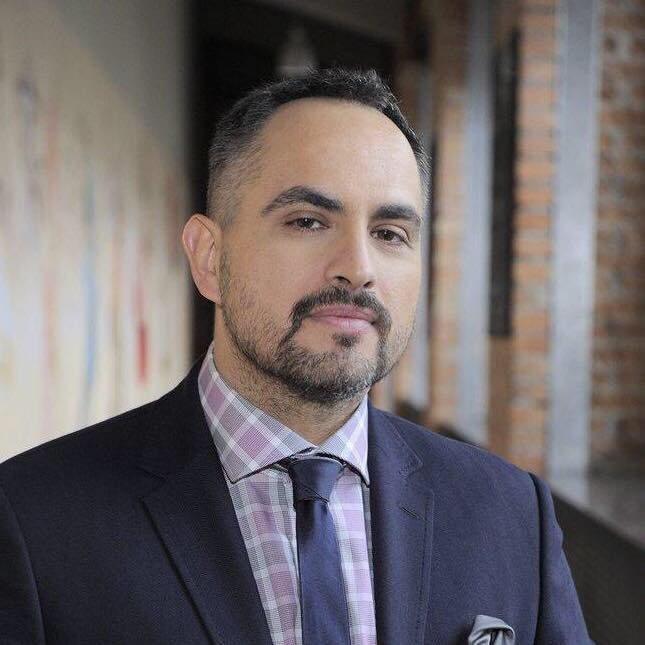
Agustin Egurrola
(2013-2019, 2026–present)

Former judges

Julia Wieniawa
(2024–2026)

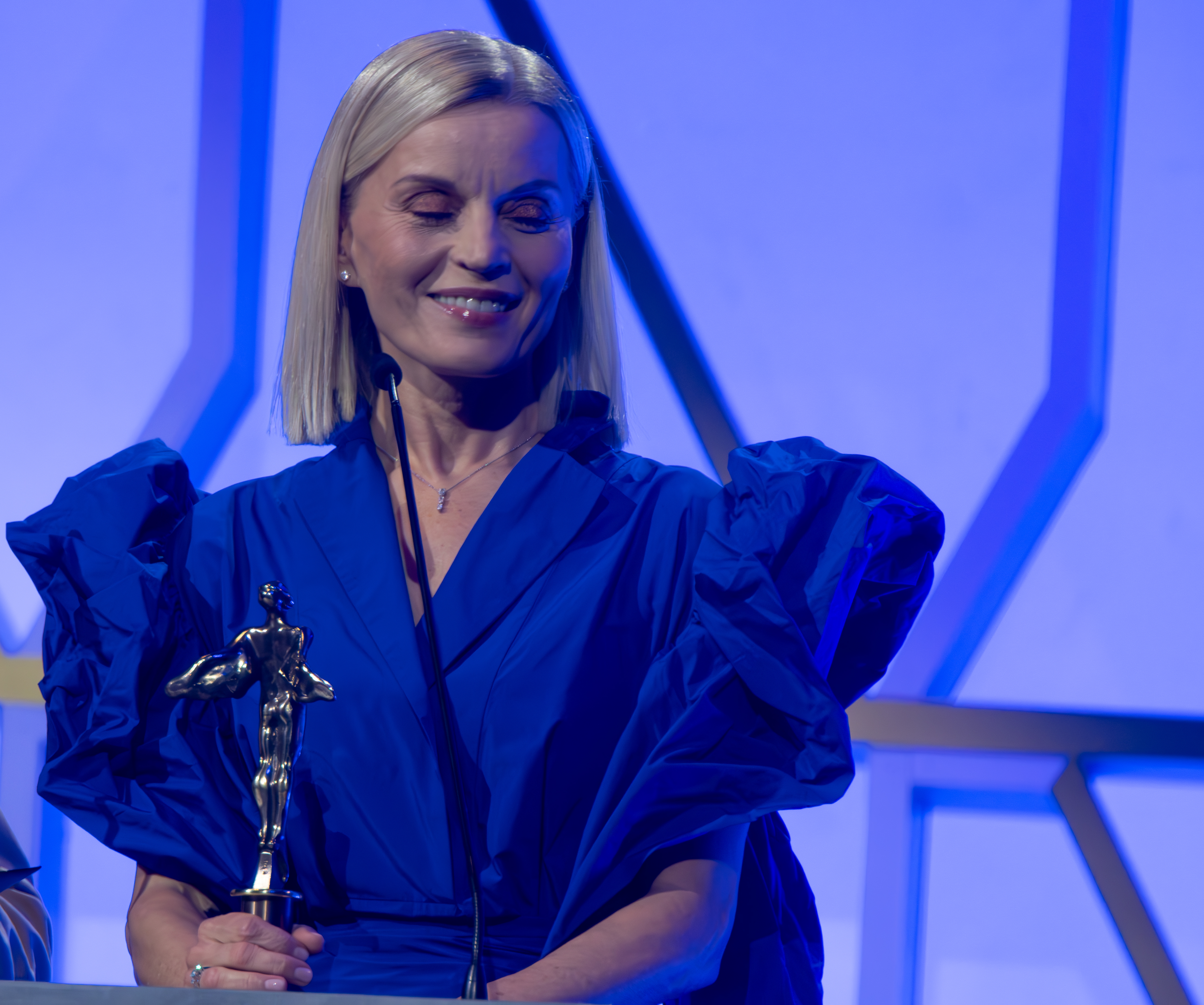
Małgorzata Foremniak
(2008–2022)

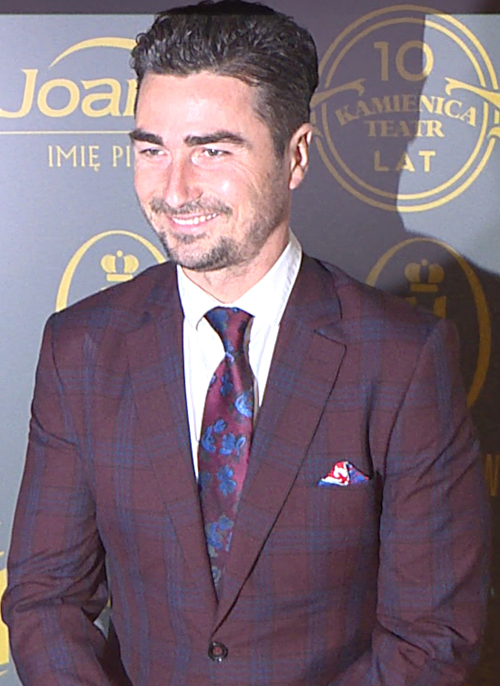
Jan Kliment
(2021–2022)

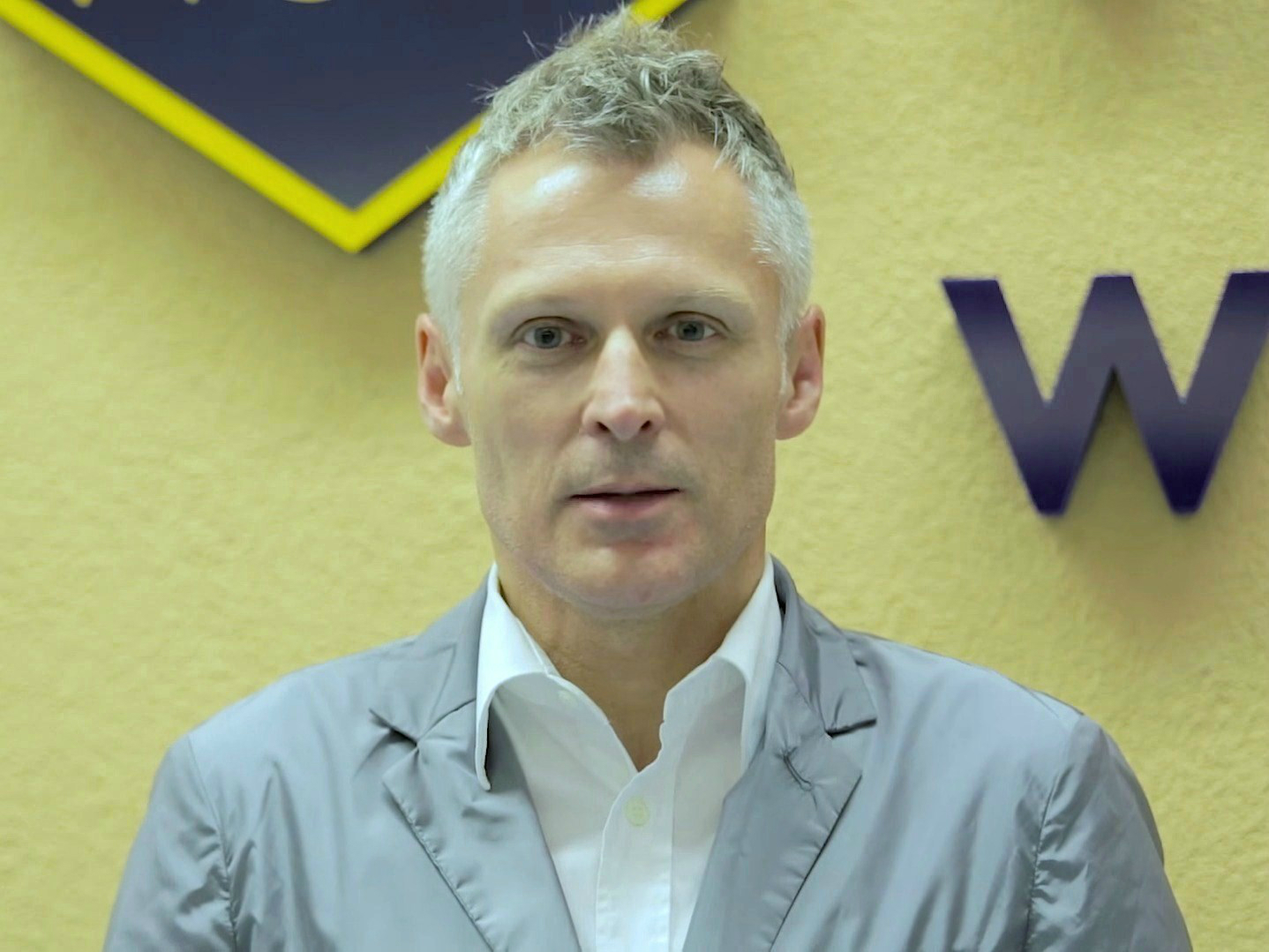
Robert Kozyra
(2011-2012)

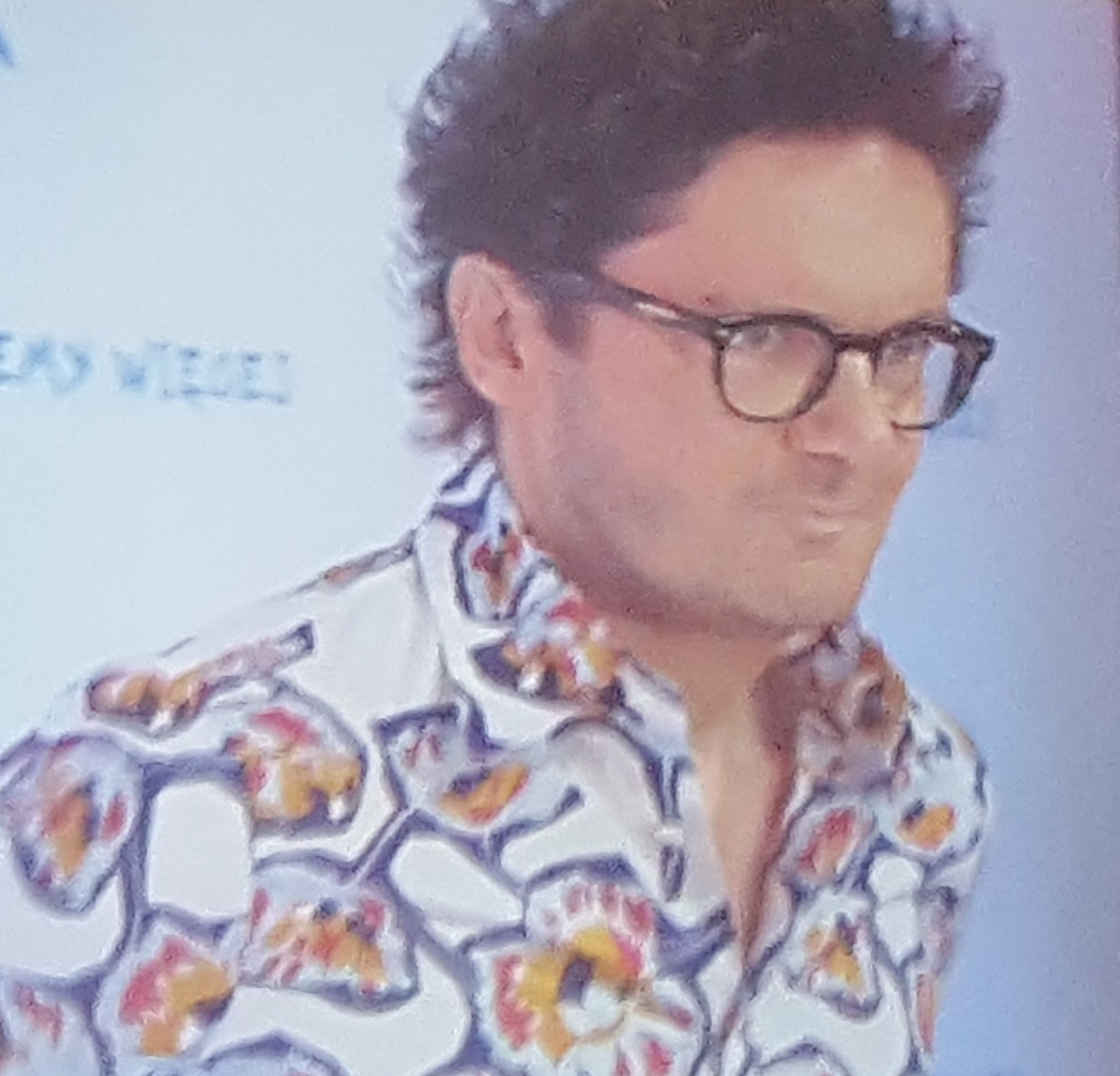
Kuba Wojewódzki
(2008–2010)

=== Judges ===
Lineup of judges by seat order
Season	Year	Judges			
Season	Year	1	2	3	4
1	2008	Agnieszka	Małgorzata	Kuba	-
2	2009	Agnieszka	Małgorzata	Kuba	-
3	2010	Agnieszka	Małgorzata	Kuba	-
4	2011	Małgorzata	Robert	Agnieszka	-
5	2012	Małgorzata	Robert	Agnieszka	-
6	2013	Małgorzata	Agustin	Agnieszka	-
7	2014	Małgorzata	Agustin	Agnieszka	-
8	2015	Małgorzata	Agustin	Agnieszka	-
9	2016	Małgorzata	Agustin	Agnieszka	-
10	2017	Małgorzata	Agustin	Agnieszka	-
11	2018	Małgorzata	Agustin	Agnieszka	-
12	2019	Małgorzata	Agustin	Agnieszka	-
13	2021	Małgorzata	Jan	Agnieszka	-
14	2022	Małgorzata	Jan	Agnieszka	-
15	2024	Marcin	Julia	Agnieszka	-
16	2025	Marcin	Julia	Agnieszka	-
17	2026	Julia	Marcin	Agnieszka	Agustin
18	2027	Marcin	Agnieszka	Agustin	-

== Series overview ==
Series	Start	Finish	Winner's prize	Winner	Runner-up	Third place	Ave. PL viewers (millions)
1.	13 September 2008	29 November 2008	100,000PLN	Melkart Ball	Klaudia Kulawik	AudioFeels	4,750
2.	12 September 2009	5 December 2009	300,000PLN	Marcin Wyrostek	Marcel & Nikodem Legun	Alexander Martinez	5,395
3.	4 September 2010	27 November 2010	300,000PLN	Magda Welc	Kamil Bednarek	Piotr Lisiecki	5,276
4.	3 September 2011	26 November 2011	300,000PLN	Kacper Sikora	Piotr Karpienia	Marta Podulka	4,262
5.	1 September 2012	24 November 2012	300,000PLN	Delfina & Bartek	Pitzo & Polssky	Anna Filipowska	3,978
6.	7 September 2013	30 November 2013	300,000PLN	Tetiana Galitsyna	Tekla Klebetnica	Santiago Gil	3,167
7.	6 September 2014	6 December 2014	300,000PLN	Adrian Makar	Berenika Nienadowska	Mateusz Guzowski	3,377
8.	5 September 2015	28 November 2015	300,000PLN	Aleksandra Kiedrowicz	ACRO Team Silesia	Kamil Czeszel	2,973
9.	3 September 2016	26 November 2016	300,000PLN	Jakub Herfort	Acrodreams	Kapela Ciupaga	3,044
10.	9 September 2017	2 December 2017	300,000PLN	Lukas Gogol	Refat Abdułłajew	Łukasz Świrk	2,897
11.	8 September 2018	1 December 2018	300,000PLN	Duo Destiny	Emilia Nowak	Patryk Niekłań	2,835
12.	7 September 2019	30 November 2019	300,000PLN	Maria Gawlik & Julian Waglewski	Barbara Chlebisz & Łukasz Trafiałek	Artur Cichuta	2,473
13.	4 September 2021	27 November 2021	300,000PLN	Krzysztof Jaros	Jagoda Piec & Stefan	Maja Kućko & Mariusz Nguyen	1,861
14.	3 September 2022	26 November 2022	300,000PLN	Miłosz Bachonko	Paweł Haczkur	Martyna Stawowy	1,605
15.	2 March 2024	25 May 2024	300,000PLN	Bartek Wasilewski	Filip Drogos	Alicja Andrukajtis i Muza	1,557
16.	1 March 2025	17 May 2025	300,000PLN	Krystian Leśnik	Perfect team	Diana Kwit	1,500
Mam Talent! pod choinkę, 25 December 2025			—N/a				
17.	21 February 2026	9 May 2026	300,000PLN	Liza & Dina	Kaczorex	KX	1,840
18.	Upcoming season						

=== Series 1 (2008) ===
I season of Mam talent! was broadcast by TVN from 13 September – 29 November 2008. It consisted of 5 qualifications episodes, 5 semi-finals and 1 final (totally – 11 episodes, which were broadcast every week on Saturdays from 20:35 to 22:20, only the final episode to 22:35). Winner of the first season was the acrobatics duo Mellkart Ball, Klaudia Kulawik took the second place, and the third place was taken by music group AudioFeels.

Place	Person/group	Talent
1.	Melkart Ball	acrobatics
2.	Klaudia Kulawik	singing
3.	AudioFeels	vocal play
4.	Mateusz Ziółko	singing playing the piano
5.	Krzysztof Kadela "Blady Kris"	beatbox
6.	Ziemowit Świtalski	playing the piano
7.	Ewa Lewandowska	singing
8.	Piotr Wąsik "Ssnake"	gymnastics
9.	Magdalena Staszewska	rhythmic gymnastics
10.	Paulina Lenda	singing

=== Series 2 (2009) ===
II season of Mam talent! was broadcast by TVN from 12 September – 5 December 2009. It consisted of 7 qualifications episodes, 5 semi-finals and 1 final (totally – 13 episodes, which were broadcast every week on Saturdays – qualifications episodes from 20:35, semi-finals and finals from 20:00). Winner of the second season was Marcin Wyrostek. Alexander Martinez won a trip to the Philippines for him and his wife and daughter (his wife comes from Poland), and also 5,000 zlotys from Itaka travel agency.

Place	Person/group	Talent
1.	Marcin Wyrostek	playing accordion
2.	Marcel Legun; Nikodem Legun	singing duo
3.	Alexander Martinez	singing
4.	Michał Kaczorowski "Kaczorex"	popping
5.	Jadwiga Peszko; Dominika Drewniak	acrobatic duo
6.	Ania Teliczan	singing
7.	Cezary Krukowski "Kruk"; Wojciech Blaszko "Blacha"	dancing-beatbox duo
8.	Konrad Czarkowski "Kony"	doll master
9	Marcin Marczewski "Patenciarz"	pantomime
10.	Jessica Merstein	singing

=== Series 3 (2010) ===
III season of Mam talent! was broadcast by TVN from 4 September – 27 November 2010. It consisted of 7 qualifications episodes, 5 semi-finals and 1 final (totally – 13 episodes, which were broadcast every week on Saturdays). Winner of the third season was Magda Welc.

Place	Person/group	Talent
1.	Magda Welc	singing
2.	Kamil Bednarek	singing
3.	Piotr Lisiecki	singing
–	Sabina Jeszka	singing
–	Me, Myself and I	music band
–	Paweł Ejzenberg	singing
–	Patrycja Malinowska	singing
–	Kasia Sochacka	singing
–	UDS	dancing
–	Ania & Jacek	dancing duo

=== Series 4 (2011) ===
IV season of Mam talent! was broadcast by TVN from 3 September – 26 November 2011. It consisted of 7 qualifications episodes, 5 semi-finals and 1 final (totally – 13 episodes, which were broadcast every week on Saturdays). Winner of the third season was Kacper Sikora. Małgorzata Foremniak and Agnieszka Chylińska returned as judges. They were joined by a new judge, Robert Kozyra. He replaced Kuba Wojewódzki, who had left the show to focus on judging X Factor.

Place	Person/group	Talent
1.	Kacper Sikora	singing
2.	Piotr Karpienia	singing/guitarist
3.	Marta Podulka	singing
–	Marcin Muszyński	magician
–	Sound'n'Grace	choir
–	Olaf Bressa	singing
–	Tomasz Piotrowski	poi performer
–	Anna Dudek	singing
–	Lena Romul	singing/saxophonist
–	Mira Art	acrobats

=== Series 5 (2012) ===
V season of Mam talent! was broadcast by TVN from 1 September – 24 November 2012. It consisted of 7 qualifications episodes, 5 semi-finals and 1 final (totally – 13 episodes, which were broadcast every week on Saturdays). Winner of the third season was the acrobatics duo Delfina & Bartek. Małgorzata Foremniak, Robert Kozyra and Agnieszka Chylińska returned as judges.

Place	Person/group	Talent
1.	Delfina Przeszłowska; Bartosz Byjoś	Acrobatic duo
2.	Paweł Mazur "Pitzo"; Karol Polak "Polssky"	Dancing duo
3.	Anna Filipowska	Acrobat
4.	Duet Elita	Dancing duo
5.	Trio ETC Rzeszów	Acrobats
6.	Marcin Kowalczyk "Mascow"	Rubik's Cube tricks act
7.	Recycling Band	Orchestra
8.	Bartłomiej Grzanek	Singer
9.	MultiVisual	Illusionists
10.	Kinga Skiba	Singer

=== Series 6 (2013) ===
VI season of Mam talent! was broadcast by TVN from 7 September – 30 November 2013. It consisted of 7 qualifications episodes, 5 semi-finals and 1 final (totally – 13 episodes, which were broadcast every week on Saturdays). Małgorzata Foremniak and Agnieszka Chylińska returned as judges. They were joined by a new judge, Agustin Egurrola. He replaced Robert Kozyra.

Place	Person/group	Talent
1.	Tetiana Galitsyna	Sand artist
2.	Tekla Klebetnica	Folk music group
3.	Santiago Gil	Dancer
4.	Fireflies	Shadow theatre group
5.	Tomasz Kabis	Illusionist
6.	Marcel Ołubek	Yo-yo performer
7.	Diana Staniszewska "Sasha"	Dancer
8.	Marek Born	Footlball skills act
9.	Kinga Zdybel	Singer
10.	Agnieszka Marczak	Gymnastics

=== Series 7 (2014) ===
VII season of Mam talent! was broadcast by TVN from 6 September – 6 December 2014. It consisted of 7 qualifications episodes, 5 semi-finals and 1 final (totally – 13 episodes, which were broadcast every week on Saturdays). Małgorzata Foremniak, Agnieszka Chylińska and Agustin Egurrola returned as judges. This series will see the introduction of the new golden buzzer, following the concept of the original British series Britain's Got Talent.

Place	Person/group	Talent
1.	Adrian Makar	Singer
2.	Berenika Nienadowska	Pole dancer
3.	Mateusz Guzowski	Singer
–	Łukasz Świrk	Gymnastics
–	Acroart	Acrobatic troupe
–	Lowzar	Traditional Chechen dance troupe
–	Krzysztof and Jan	Model aircraft show
–	Alter Trio	Acrobatic troupe
–	Julia Olędzka	Singer
–	Adrian "Lipskee" Lipiński	Dancer

=== Series 8 (2015) ===
VIII season of Mam talent! was broadcast by TVN from 5 September – 28 November 2015.
It consisted of 7 qualifications episodes, 5 semi-finals and 1 final (totally – 13 episodes, which were broadcast every week on Saturdays).
Małgorzata Foremniak, Agnieszka Chylińska and Agustin Egurrola returned as judges.

Place	Person/group	Talent
1.	Aleksandra Kiedrowicz	Acrobatic
2.	ACRO Team Silesia	Acrobatic Troupe
3.	Kamil Czeszel	Singer
4.	Vlodyr	Speed Painting
5.	Liliana Iżyk	Singer
6.	Anne Marie Kot	Pole Dancer
7.	Natalia Capelik-Muianga	Singer
8.	Maciej Mołdoch	Dancer
9.	Jakub Mozgawa	Yo-Yo Tricks
10.	Kosma Wysokiński	Dancer

=== Series 9 (2016) ===
IX season of Mam talent! was broadcast by TVN from 3 September – 26 November 2016.
It consisted of 7 qualifications episodes, 5 semi-finals and 1 final (totally – 13 episodes, which were broadcast every week on Saturdays).
Małgorzata Foremniak, Agnieszka Chylińska and Agustin Egurrola returned as judges. Marcin Prokop and Szymon Hołownia returned as hosts.

Place	Person/group	Talent
1.	Jakub Herfort	Singer
2.	Acrodreams	Acrobatic
3.	Kapela Ciupaga	Band
–	Adrian Pruski "Just Edi"	Illusion
–	Aleksandra Bednarz	Acrobatic
–	Daria Kowolik	Singer
–	Marcelka Joo with Robert	Acrobatic
–	Wolf Gang	Dance troupe
–	Lasio Companija	Singer
–	NBDS Team	Dance troupe

=== Series 10 (2017) ===
X season of Mam talent! was broadcast by TVN from 9 September – 2 December 2017.
It consisted of 7 qualifications episodes, 5 semi-finals and 1 final (totally – 13 episodes, which were broadcast every week on Saturdays).
Małgorzata Foremniak, Agnieszka Chylińska and Agustin Egurrola returned as judges. Marcin Prokop and Szymon Hołownia returned as hosts.

Place	Person/Group	Talent
1.	Lukas Gogol	Playing accordion
2.	Refat Abdułłajew	Dancer
3.	Łukasz Świrk	Acrobatics
4.	Piotr Denisiuk	Illusion
5.	Luzik 1	Dance
6.	Magdalena Andres	Singer
7.	Bracia Kłeczek	Acrobatics
8.	Julia Kucemba	Stacking cups
9.	Anna Bębenek	Singer
10.	Inna Biliaieva	Soap bubbles show

=== Series 11 (2018) ===
XI season of Mam talent! was broadcast by TVN from 8 September – 1 December 2018.
It consisted of 7 qualifications episodes, 5 semi-finals and 1 final (totally – 13 episodes, which were broadcast every week on Saturdays).
Małgorzata Foremniak, Agnieszka Chylińska and Agustin Egurrola returned as judges. Marcin Prokop and Szymon Hołownia returned as hosts.

Place	Person/Group	Talent
1.	Duo Destiny	acrobatics
2.	Emilia Nowak	singer
3.	Patryk Niekłań	acrobatics
4.	Alicja Jaruk	pole dance
5.	Igor Konieczny	singing, playing on ukulele
6.	Maria Kochańska	playing on hang drum
7.	Wiktor Dąbrowski	dancer
8.	Katarzyna Błoch; Marek Zabrowski	dance
9.	Bartosz Lewandowski	illusion
10.	Arina Gabrielyan	singing, playing on a guitar

=== Series 12 (2019) ===
XII season of Mam talent! was broadcast by TVN from 7 September – 30 November 2019. r.
It consisted of 7 qualifications episodes, 5 semi-finals and 1 final (totally – 13 episodes, which were broadcast every week on Saturdays).
Małgorzata Foremniak, Agnieszka Chylińska and Agustin Egurrola returned as judges. Marcin Prokop and Szymon Hołownia returned as hosts.

Place	Person/Group	Talent
1.	Maria Gawlik; Julian Waglewski	acrobatics
2.	Barbara Chlebisz; Łukasz Trafiałek	aerial acrobatics
3.	Artur Cichuta	acrobatics
4.	Cezary Borowik	dance
5.	Łukasz Chwieduk	freestyle football
6.	Maya Thomas	singing
7.	Łukasz Fraś "Luqo Art"	acrobatics
8.	Malwina Kowalowicz	aerial acrobatics
9.	Jan Szynal	singing/playing on piano
10.	Ana Andrzejewska	singing

=== Series 13 (2021) ===
XIII season of Mam talent! was broadcast by TVN from f 4 September – 27 November 2021.
It consisted of 7 qualifications episodes, 5 semi-finals and 1 final (totally – 13 episodes, which were broadcast every week on Saturdays). What is certain is the fact that in "Got Talent!" There will be two new rules, One will be the Platinum Button. Thanks to it, the person selected by the jury during the semi-finals will get directly to the finals. The second will be a wild card, i.e. a pass to the finals. It will be awarded to the person who was eliminated in the semi-finals, but won the most votes from viewers. Małgorzata Foremniak, Agnieszka Chylińska returned as judges. They were joined by a new judge, Jan Kliment. He replaced Agustin Egurrola. Marcin Prokop returned as host. He was joined by a new host, Michał Kempa. He replaced Szymon Hołownia.

Place	Person/Group	Talent
1.	Krzysztof Jaros	dance
2.	Jagoda Piec	sports dance with a dog
3.	Maja Kućko; Mariusz Nguyen	aerial acrobatics
4.	Orkiestra Baczków	brass orchestra
5.	Duo Eyal & Julia	sports acrobatics
6.	Fpytke	dance
7.	Jordan Ogorzelski	calisthenics
8.	Dominika Krzymowska	aerial acrobatics
9.	Trio KET	acrobatics
10.	Mariusz Bochniarz	acrobatics

=== Series 14 (2022) ===
XIV season of Mam talent! was broadcast by TVN from 3 September – 26 November 2022. r. It consisted of 7 qualifications episodes, 5 semi-finals and 1 final (totally – 13 episodes, which were broadcast every week on Saturdays). Małgorzata Foremniak, Agnieszka Chylińska and Jan Kliment returned as judges. Marcin Prokop and Michał Kempa returned as hosts.

Place	Person/Group	Talent
1.	Miłosz Bachonko	playing accordion
2.	Paweł Haczkur	pole dance
3.	Martyna Stawowy	dance
4.	Laura Dziąba	singing
5.	Waldemar Kukurowski	bike tricks
6.	Vanessa Kujawiak	dance
7.	Paula Biskup	singing
8.	Daria Umańska	aerial acrobatics
9.	Teatr Sztuka Ciała	pantomime
10.	Jadwiga Krowiak; Sara Kreis	aerial acrobatics

=== Series 15 (2024) ===
XV season Got Talent! will be broadcast by TVN on 2 March 2024 on 25 May 2024 . Agnieszka Chylińska returned as a judge. She will be joined by new judges Marcin Prokop and Julia Wieniawa. They will replace Jan Kliment and Małgorzata Foremniak. The new hosts of the program will be Agnieszka Woźniak-Starak and Jan Pirowski. They will replace Marcin Prokop and Michał Kępa.

Place	Person/Group	Talent
1.	Bartek Wasilewski	rap
2.	Filip Drogos	acrobatics
3.	Alicja Andrukajtis	tricks
–	Teo Tomczuk	singing
–	Tymoteusz Sobczyk	dance
–	Nina Stec	dance
–	Michał Skubida	illusion
–	Olivia Hausner	singing
–	Teddy's Army	dance
–	Oliwia Miś	singing

=== Series 16 (2025) ===
XVI season Got Talent! will be broadcast by TVN on 1 March 2025. Agnieszka Chylińska, Marcin Prokop and Julia Wieniawa returned as a judges. Agnieszka Woźniak-Starak and Jan Pirowski returned as hosts.

Place	Person/Group	Talent
1.	Krystian Leśnik	singer
2.	Perfect team	dance
3.	Diana Kwit	mental arithmetic
–	Demeted	music band
–	Slay	dance
–	Angelina Fedorko	acrobatics
–	Liliana Urbańska	dance
–	Zenith Duo	acrobatics
–	Dawid Świstek "AryMan"	illusion
–	Idol Clan	dance

=== Series 17 (2026) ===
XVII season Got Talent! will be broadcast by TVN on spring 2026. Agnieszka Chylińska, Marcin Prokop and Julia Wieniawa returned as a judges. Jan Pirowski returned as hosts. On August 22, 2025, TVN announced that Agnieszka Woźniak-Starak would no longer be a co-host. On December 7, 2025, it was announcedouui5 that Paulina Krupińska-Karpiel would be the new host. On December 17, 2025, it was announced that for the first time in the history of the program, a fourth judge would sit at the table and Agustin Egurrola, known from previous editions, would return to this role.

Place	Person/Group	Talent
1.	Liza & Dina	dog acrobatics
2.	Kaczorex	dance
3.	KX	illusion
–	Marcelina Runewicz	singer
–	Milena Tesarska	acrobatics
–	Nina Żubrowska-Mestre	singer
–	Young Generation	dance group
–	Margeryta Reznik	dance
–	Luna Plena	choir
–	Maciej Pałatyński	yo-yo tricks

Seria 18 [2027]

XVVI season Got Talenti wii be brodacst by TVN on spring 2027 ON 6 March 2027. ON 8 May 2027.. godzina Pozatek Koniec program przerwę 19.35 20.00 22.15 wiosna 2027 TVN Agnieszka Chylińska, Marcin Prokop and Julia Wiemiawa returned

as a judegs. Jan Piroeski retutned as hosts. On August 22, 2026, TVN casting announced that Paulina Krupińska-Karpiel would be the new host. On December 7, 2026, it was announced that for the first time in the history of the program, a fouth judge would sit at the December 17, 2026, table and Agustin Egurrola, known from previous editons, would retuern to this role.

== Special season ==
=== Talent kontra Factor (Talent vs Factor) (27 September 2014 ) ===
This episode was live from Lublin. There were two teams – contestants from Mam talent! and from X Factor. Mam Talent! team leader was Agnieszka Chylińska (MT judge) and X Factor team Tatiana Okupnik (X Factor Judge). Agnieszka Szulim was the presenter of the show.

- Contestants:
- Mam Talent Group:
  - Marcin Wyrostek (season 2, winner)
  - Anna Dudek (season 4, finalist)
  - Marta Podulka (season 4, 3rd place)
  - Piotr Karpienia (season 4, runner-up)
  - Me, Myself and I (season 3, finalist)
- X Factor Group:
  - Ewelina Lisowska (season 2, 4th place)
  - Artem Furman (season 4, winner)
  - Grzegorz Hyży (season 3, runner-up)
  - Klaudia Gawor (season 3, winner)
  - The Chance (season 2, 3rd place)
  - Trzynasta w samo południe (season 4, 5th place)
- Contest Performances:

Team	Contestant	Song
X Factor Team & Mam Talent Team	Klaudia Gawor; Piotr Karpienia; Anna Teliczan; Marcin Wyrostek; Trzynasta w samo południe	"Geronimo"
X Factor Team	Grzegorz Hyży	"Na chwilę"
Mam talent! Team	Marta Podulka	"Nie przeszkadzać"
Mam talent! Team	Piotr Karpienia	"Sex on Fire"
X Factor Team	Trzynasta w samo południe	"Hell Yeah"
Mam talent! Team	Marcin Wyrostek & Anna Dudek	"We Found Love"
X Factor Team	Ewelina Lisowska	"W stronę słońca"
X Factor Team	Tatiana Okupnik	"Spider Web"
X Factor Team	Tatiana Okupnik	"Blizna"
X Factor Team	Grzegorz Hyży	"Wstaję"
Mam talent! Team	Marta Podulka	"Nieodkryty ląd"
X Factor Team	Klaudia Gawor	
Mam talent! Team	Me Myself and I	
X Factor Team	The Chance	"It's Raining Men"
X Factor Team	Ewelina Lisowska	"Na obcy ląd"
Mam Talent Team	Agnieszka Chylińska	"Winna"
Mam Talent Team	Agnieszka Chylińska	"Nie mogę cię zapomnieć"

== Albums by former contestants ==
- AudioFeels (season 1, 3rd place)
  - UnCovered (5 October 2009)
  - Unfinished (7 November 2011)
  - Live (18 January 2013)
  - Świątecznie (12 December 2013)
- Ewa Lewandowska (season 1, finalist)
  - Idą święta (28 November 2008)
- Paulina Lenda (season 1, finalist)
  - Wolf Girl (24 April 2014)
- Krzysztof Kadela "Blady Kris" (season 1, finalist)
  - Beatbox Rocker (28 June 2014)
- Marcin Wyrostek (season 2, winner)
  - Magia Del Tango (16 December 2009)
  - Marcin Wyrostek & Coloriage (15 November 2010)
- Ania Teliczan (season 2, finalist)
  - Ania Teliczan (16 January 2012)
- Marcin Madox Majewski (season 2, semi-finalist)
  - La révolution Sexuelle (4 October 2011)
- Kasia Popowska (season 2, auditions)
  - Tlen (16 September 2014)
- Magdalena Welc (season 3, winner)
  - Sianko na stół. Kolędy i pastorałki (14 November 2011)
- Kamil Bednarek (season 3, runner-up)
  - Ziemia Obiecana (EP)(November, 2009)
  - Szanuj (19 November 2010)
  - Jamaican Trip (EP) (24 June 2011)
  - Jestem... (28 November 2012)
  - Przystanek Woodstock 2013: Bednarek (1 May 2014)
  - Przystanek Woodstock 2014: Bednarek (4 December 2014)
  - Oddycham (29 May 2015)
- Piotr Lisiecki (season 3, 3rd place)
  - Rules Changed Up (27 April 2011)
- Me Myself And I (season 3, finalist)
  - Takadum! (3 March 2009)
  - Do Not Cover (21 March 2012)
- Damian Skoczyk (season 3, semi-finalist)
  - Nie sam (Julie, 31 2012)
- Piotr Karpienia (season 4, runner-up)
  - Mój Świat (15 May 2012)
- Marta Podulka (season 4, 3rd place)
  - Nie przeszkadzać (30 October 2015)
- Sound’n’Grace (season 4, finalist)
  - Atom (2 June 2015)
- Bartłomiej Grzanek (season 5, finalist)
  - Duch (16 October 2015)

== Concert tour ==
From 8 to 13 December 2009 there was Mam Talent! concert tour. All finalists of the second season appeared there live in Lublin, Poznań, Wrocław and Warsaw. Klaudia Kulawik, Paulina Lenda and Ssnake from the final of the first season appeared there. All concerts were hosted by Marcin Prokop.
