= Kamil Bednarek =

Polish reggae and dancehall musician

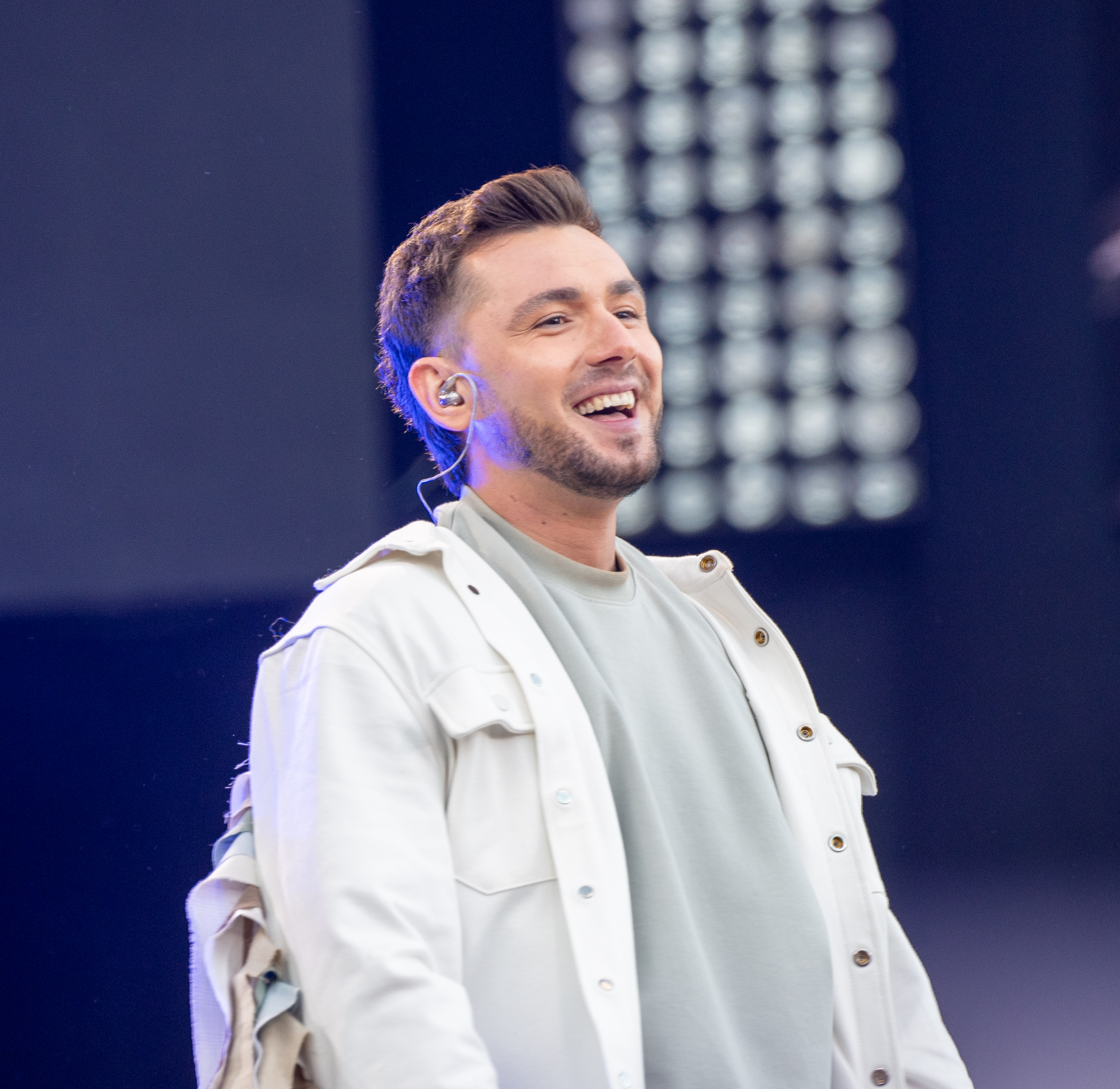
- Kamil Bednarek in 2023

Background information
- Also known as: MaccaBraa
- Born: Kamil Bednarek; 10 May 1991 (age 34); Brzeg, Poland
- Genres: Reggae, dancehall, Hip-Hop
- Occupations: Singer, musician, songwriter, composer
- Years active: 2008-present
- Labels: Lou & Rocked Boys
- Website: http://bednarekband.pl/

Kamil Bednarek (born 10 May 1991 in Brzeg) is a Polish reggae and dancehall vocalist, songwriter, composer and musician. He is best known as the runner-up in the third series of Mam talent!.

From 2008 to 2012, Bednarek was the lead singer of Star Guard Muffin, and with the band he released a studio album Szanuj (2010), which peaked at no. 1 in Poland, as well as two EPs. Since 2012, he's been the lead vocalist of a band named Bednarek, which released a number-one album Jestem... in November 2012.

== Career ==
=== Star Guard Muffin and breakthrough (2008–2011) ===
Kamil Bednarek founded Star Guard Muffin with his friends in 2008. The band's debut concert was as a support for a Polish raggamuffin band EastWest Rockers. A year later Star Guard Muffin self-released a debut EP Ziemia Obiecana (Promised Land).

In 2010, Bednarek participated in the third series of Mam talent!, the Polish version of the Got Talent series. At the casting he performed a song "I" by Kurt Nilsen and impressed the judges. In the semi-final he sang Eric Clapton's "Tears in Heaven" and got to the final, where he placed 2nd after singing "Is This Love" by Bob Marley.

Around the same time, on 19 November 2010, Star Guard Muffin released its debut full-length album Szanuj. On the wave of Kamil's popularity, the album peaked at no. 1 on the Polish sales chart OLiS.

In April 2011, the band went to Jamaica. They recorded an EP titled Jamaican Trip in the Tuff Gong studio in Kingston. The record features guest appearances by Dean Fraser, Earl "Chinna" Smith, Capleton, The Tamlins, musicians from Shaggy's band and others.

=== Bednarek (2012–present) ===
At the beginning of 2012, Kamil Bednarek took part in the second season of the TV show Bitwa na głosy, broadcast by TVP 2. The group of 16 vocalists from Brzeg, which was coached by him, won the show.

In February 2012 it was announced that bassist Kuba Wojciechowski decided to leave Star Guard Muffin and the band was suspended. Kamil Bednarek decided to continue playing with keyboardist Radosław Szyszkowski and drummer Maciej Pilarz under the band name Bednarek, and the line-up was completed by guitarist Piotr Bielawski and bassist Piotr Stanclik. The band's studio album Jestem..., released on 28 November 2012, debuted at no. 1 at OLiS chart and was certified platinum.

== Discography ==
=== Studio albums ===
Title	Album details	Peak chart positions	Sales	Certifications
Title	Album details	POL	Sales	Certifications
Jestem...	Released: November 28, 2012; Label: Lou & Rocked Boys; Formats: CD, digital download	1	POL: 150,000+	POL: Diamond
Oddycham	Released: May 29, 2015; Label: Lou & Rocked Boys	2	POL: 30,000+	POL: Platinum
Talizman	Released: December 1, 2017; Label: Lou & Rocked Boys	6	POL: 15,000+	POL: Gold
"—" denotes a recording that did not chart or was not released in that territory.

=== Live albums ===
Title	Album details	Peak chart positions
Title	Album details	POL
Przystanek Woodstock 2013: Bednarek	Released: May 1, 2014; Label: Złoty Melon/Rockers Publishing; Formats: CD+DVD	2
Przystanek Woodstock 2014: Bednarek	Released: December 4, 2014; Label: Złoty Melon/Rockers Publishing; Formats: CD+DVD	45
"—" denotes a recording that did not chart or was not released in that territory.

=== Compilation albums ===
Title	Album details	Peak chart positions
Title	Album details	POL
Jestem...suplement	Released: December 5, 2013; Label: Lou & Rocked Boys; Formats: CD	17
"—" denotes a recording that did not chart or was not released in that territory.

=== Singles ===
Title	Year	Album
"Nie chcę wyjeżdżać stąd"	2012	Jestem...
"Chwile jak te"	2014	Oddycham
Donatan & Cleo - "Ten czas" (featuring Kamil Bednarek)	2014	Hiper/Chimera
"Sailing"	2015	Oddycham
"Euforia" (featuring Staff)	2015	Oddycham
"List"	2016	Oddycham
"Talizman" (featuring Matheo)	2017	Talizman
"Poczuj luz"	2017	Talizman

==== Other charted songs ====
Single	Year	Peak chart positions	Album
Single	Year	POL	Album
"Cisza"	2013	1	Jestem...
"Dni, których jeszcze nie znamy"	2013	16	Jestem...
Mesajah - "Szukając szczęścia" (featuring Kamil Bednarek)	2013	8	Jestem stąd
