= Modern Rocking =

Studio album by Agnieszka Chylińska
- Released: October 23, 2009
- Recorded: 2008
- Genre: Pop, electronic
- Length: 34:22
- Label: EMI Music Poland
- Producer: PLAN B

Singles from Modern Rocking
- 1. "Nie Mogę Cię Zapomnieć" Released: 2009; 2. "Niebo" Released: 2009; 3. "Zima" Released: 2010

Professional ratings
Review scores
Source	Rating
Interia.pl	3/10 stars
Onet.pl	4/5 stars

Modern Rocking is a solo album by Polish singer Agnieszka Chylińska. It is the seventh studio album in her career. In the first week of its release it made it to the OLiS list of best-selling Polish albums, and was certified gold. On November 18, 2009, it was certified platinum.

"Nie mogę Cię zapomnieć" won the 2010 "Digital Song of the Year" in Poland for being the best selling digital single of 2009.

== Track listing ==
All songs written by Agnieszka Chylińska and produced by Bartek Królik and Marek Piotrkowski.

No.	Title	Length
1.	"Ostatnia Łza"	3:51
2.	"Foch"	3:34
3.	"Niebo"	4:31
4.	"Zima"	4:39
5.	"Powiedz"	4:10
6.	"Nie Mogę Cię Zapomnieć"	4:13
7.	"Normalka"	3:10
8.	"Plim Plam"	2:39
9.	"Wybaczam Ci"	3:35

== Personnel ==
The following is according to the source material.

- Agnieszka Chylińska – vocals
- Bartek Królik – bass guitar, guitar, keyboard, percussion, cello
- Marek Piotrowski – keyboard, percussion, programmable instruments
- Lester Estelle Jr – percussion

== Charts and certifications ==
=== Charts ===
Chart (2009)	Peak position
Polish Albums (ZPAV)	1

=== Year-end charts ===
Chart (2009)	Rank
Polish Albums Chart (ZPAV)	12

=== Certifications ===
Region	Certification	Certified units/sales
Poland (ZPAV)	Platinum	30,000^{*}
^{*} Sales figures based on certification alone.
