= Mam talent! series 3 =

Mam talent!
- Series 3
- Hosted by: Marcin Prokop; Szymon Hołownia
- Judges: Agnieszka Chylińska; Małgorzata Foremniak; Kuba Wojewódzki
- Winner: Magda Welc
- Runner-up: Kamil Bednarek

Release
- Original network: TVN
- Original release: 4 September – 27 November 2010

Series chronology
- Next → Series 4

The third series of Mam talent! premiered on Saturday 4 September 2010 at 20:00 on TVN. It consisted of seven auditions' episodes, five semi-finals and the final, which aired on 27 November 2010. The winner of the competition was Magda Welc, 11-year-old singer and she gained 300 000 PLN and the runner-up was Kamil Bednare. There was also a Special Prize - 100 000 PLN founded by Apart - which was given to Sabina Jeszka. Winner of the second series, Marcin Wyrostek performed during the first semi-final and Paul Potts, winner of the first series of Britain's Got Talent was a special guest on 13 November 2010.

== Semi-final 1 ==
Date: 23 October 2010
Special guest: Marcin Wyrostek

Order	Finished	Artist	Act	Judges' choices		
Order	Finished	Artist	Act	Chylińska	Foremniak	Wojewódzki
1	unknown	Flexi	dance group			
2	unknown	Cher	singer/entertainer			
3	2nd (won judges' vote)	Patrycja Malinowska	singer	✔	✔	✔
4	unknown	Ibrahim Mahmoud	Egyptian dance			
5	unknown	Yclan	entertainers			
6	3rd (lost judges' vote)	Michał Grobelny	singer			
7	unknown	Bacewicz Quartet	string quartet			
8	1st	Magda Welc	singer			

== Semi-final 2 ==
Date: 30 October 2010

Order	Finished	Artist	Act	Judges' choices		
Order	Finished	Artist	Act	Chylińska	Foremniak	Wojewódzki
1	unknown	Shock Dance	dance group			
2	3rd (lost judges' vote)	Damian Skoczyk	singer	✔		
3	unknown	Sławomir Jenerowicz	entertainer			
4	2nd (won judges' vote)	Me, Myself and I	singing trio		✔	✔
5	unknown	Kamil i Krystian	acrobatics			
6	unknown	Saavedra	boyband			
7	unknown	Mirosław Pyznar	acrobatics			
8	1st	Sabina Jeszka	singer			

== Semi-final 3 ==
Date: 6 November 2010

Order	Finished	Artist	Act	Judges' choices		
Order	Finished	Artist	Act	Chylińska	Foremniak	Wojewódzki
1	unknown	Iskierka	dance group			
2	unknown	Jim Williams	entertainer			
3	unknown	The Prisoners	entertainers			
4	3rd (lost judges' vote)	Paweł Paprocki	singer			✔
5	unknown	Krakowska Szkoła Wushu	martial art			
6	1st	Piotr Lisiecki	singer			
7	2nd (won judges' vote)	Ania i Jacek	dancing duo	✔	✔	
8	unknown	Mocha	girlband			

== Semi-final 4 ==
Date: 13 November 2010
Special guest: Paul Potts

Order	Finished	Artist	Act	Judges' choices		
Order	Finished	Artist	Act	Chylińska	Foremniak	Wojewódzki
1	unknown	Emitels Brass	musician group			
2	unknown	Leila	gymnastics			
3	4	Adam Machalica	harmonica player			
4	unknown	Kamila Mrozik	singer			
5	2nd (won judges' vote)	UDS	dance group	✔		✔
6	unknown	Maciej Kozłowski	entertainer			
7	3rd (lost judges' vote)	Jędrzej Indebski	dancer		✔	
8	1st	Kamil Bednarek	singer			

== Semi-final 5 ==
Date: 20 November 2010

Order	Finished	Artist	Act	Judges' choices		
Order	Finished	Artist	Act	Chylińska	Foremniak	Wojewódzki
1	unknown	Enzym Crew	dance group			
2	unknown	Kalina Kasprzak	singer			
3	unknown	Emil Kuśmirek	dancer			
4	unknown	Diverso	singing trio			
5	unknown	Korolev Family	gymnastics			
6	2nd (won judges' vote)	Kasia Sochacka	singer	✔	✔	✔
7	3rd (lost judges' vote)	Gosia Staszewska	gymnastics			
8	1st	Paweł Ejzenberg	singer			

== Final ==
Date: 27 November 2010

Key	Winner	Runner-up	Special Prize

Performance Order	Finished	Percentage of votes	Artist	Act
1	TBA	TBA	Patrycja Malinowska	singer
2	TBA	TBA	Kasia Sochacka	singer
3	TBA	TBA	Ania & Jacek	dancer
4	3rd	TBA	Piotr Lisiecki	singer
5	TBA	TBA	Sabina Jeszka	singer
6	TBA	TBA	Me, Myself and I	singing trio
7	TBA	TBA	Paweł Ejzenberg	singer
8	2nd	TBA	Kamil Bednarek	singer
9	TBA	TBA	UDS	dance group
10	1st	TBA	Magda Welc	singer

== Live show chart ==
Legend
Winner	Runner-up	Special Prize

Won Semi Final	Judges' Choice	Top 3 (Eliminated)	Eliminated

Show	Contestant	Result					
Show	Contestant	SF 1	SF 2	SF 3	SF 4	SF 5	Final
Final	Magda Welc	Win					1st
Final	Kamil Bednarek				Win		2nd
Final	Piotr Lisiecki			Win			ELIM
Final	Sabina Jeszka		Win				SP
Final	Patrycja Malinowska	JC					ELIM
Final	Kasia Sochacka					JC	ELIM
Final	Ania & Jacek			JC			ELIM
Final	Me, Myself and I		JC				ELIM
Final	Paweł Ejzenberg					Win	ELIM
Final	UDS				JC		ELIM
Semi; Final 5
Semi; Final 5	Gosia Staszewska					Top 3	
Semi; Final 5	Enzym Crew					ELIM	
Semi; Final 5	Kalina Kasprzak					ELIM	
Semi; Final 5	Emil Kuśmirek					ELIM	
Semi; Final 5	Diverso					ELIM	
Semi; Final 5	Korolev Family					ELIM	
Semi; Final 4	Jędrzej Indebski				Top 3		
Semi; Final 4	Emitels Brass				ELIM		
Semi; Final 4	Leila				ELIM		
Semi; Final 4	Adam Machalica				ELIM		
Semi; Final 4	Kamila Mrozik				ELIM		
Semi; Final 4	Maciej Kozłowski				ELIM		
Semi; Final 3	Paweł Paprocki			Top 3			
Semi; Final 3	Iskierka			ELIM			
Semi; Final 3	Jim Williams			ELIM			
Semi; Final 3	The Prisoners			ELIM			
Semi; Final 3	Krakowska Szkoła Wushu			ELIM			
Semi; Final 3	Mocha			ELIM			
Semi; Final 2	Damian Skoczyk		Top 3				
Semi; Final 2	Shock Dance		ELIM				
Semi; Final 2	Sławomir Jenerowicz		ELIM				
Semi; Final 2	Kamil i Krystian		ELIM				
Semi; Final 2	Saavedra		ELIM				
Semi; Final 2	Mirosław Pyznar		ELIM				
Semi; Final 1	Michał Grobelny	Top 3					
Semi; Final 1	Flexi	ELIM					
Semi; Final 1	Cher	ELIM					
Semi; Final 1	Ibrahim Mahmoud	ELIM					
Semi; Final 1	Yclan	ELIM					
Semi; Final 1	Bacewicz Quartet	ELIM					

== Ratings ==
Show	Date	Official rating	Share	Share 16-49
Auditions 1	4 September	4 199 359	31,50%	37,71%
Auditions 2	11 September	4 558 421	32,07%	36,44%
Auditions 3	18 September	4 792 298	31,98%	35,87%
Auditions 4	25 September	5 351 017	36,64%	42,81%
Auditions 5	2 October	5 499 206	36,08%	45,21%
Auditions 6	9 October	5 499 206	35,38%	40,63%
Auditions 7	16 October	5 769 375	38,73%	47,32%
Semi Final 1	23 October	5 179 601	32,90%	38,66%
Semi Final 2	30 October	5 604 377	35,67%	42,53%
Semi Final 3	6 November	5 648 856	34,81%	39,85%
Semi Final 4	13 November	5 130 995	32,98%	37,35%
Semi Final 5	20 November	5 428 154	35,01%	38,30%
The Final	27 November	5 773 209	38,83%	45,27%
Series average	2010	5 276 001	34,96%	40,72%
