= Ania Teliczan =

Polish singer-songwriter

- Born: Anna Teliczan
- Origin: Ostróda, Poland
- Genres: Soul, jazz
- Occupation: Singer-songwriter
- Instrument: vocals
- Years active: 2009–present
- Label: Sony Music Entertainment Poland
- Website: aniateliczan.com

Ania Teliczan is a Polish singer-songwriter who rose to fame as a finalist of the second series of television show Poland's Got Talent in 2009. Soon after the end of the show, she was signed by Sony Music Poland. Her debut album was released on 16 January 2012 and had been recorded in the United Kingdom with producer Troy Miller, who previously worked with Amy Winehouse. It consists of 10 songs in style of 60's in English and Polish, some of which written by Andrzej Piaseczny and Teliczan herself.

== Poland's Got Talent ==
List of songs sung by Anna Teliczan on Poland's Got Talent:

Week	Song choice	Result
Audition	"Rehab"	Through to the semi-final
Semi-final	"Make You Feel My Love"	Through to the final
Final	"Nothing Compares 2 U"	6th place

== Discography ==
=== Albums ===
Title	Album details	Peak chart positions
Title	Album details	POL
Ania Teliczan	First studio album; Released: 16 January 2012; Label: Sony Music Entertainment Poland; Formats: CD, digital download	39

=== Singles ===
Single	Year	Album
"One True Lover"	2012	Ania Teliczan

==== As featured artist ====
Single	Year	Album
"Znowu pada" (Seweryn Krajewski featuring Ania Teliczan)	2011	Jak tam jest
