= Star Guard Muffin =

Polish reggae band

- Origin: Brzeg, Poland
- Genres: Reggae, roots reggae, ragga, dancehall
- Years active: 2008–2012
- Labels: Lou & Rocked Boys
- Members: Kamil Bednarek; Szymon Chudy; Radek Szyszkowski; Kuba Wojciechowski; Maciek Pilarz
- Past members: Piotr Eliasz; Paweł Książek
- Website: sgmband.com

Star Guard Muffin also known as SGM is a Polish band formed in Brzeg in 2008, and suspended in February 2012. It consisted of vocalist Kamil Bednarek, guitarist Szymon Chudy, keyboardist Radek Szyszkowski, bassist Kuba Wojciechowski and drummer Maciek Pilarz. The band is widely associated with reggae music, including roots reggae, ragga and dancehall.

== History ==
=== Early years ===
The band was formed in Brzeg in May 2008. Their first performance was as opening performers before EastWest Rockers' concert in club BigStar in Brzeg. In September they took the first place on Rock Reggae Festiwal in Brzeszcze.

In August 2009 Star Guard Muffin won Grand Prix at Festiwal Artystyczny Młodzieży Akademickiej in Świnoujście. In the same month they performed on Second Days of Youngsters in Dobre Miasto.

=== Breakthrough ===
The band reached media attention in September 2010 after Kamil Bednarek's participation in the third series of television show Poland's Got Talent, where he placed second. In November their debut album Szanuj was released. It reached the top places of OLiS chart. In December it became golden and in January platinum. The album turned out to be one of the fastest selling since the beginning of the 21st century and became the second bestseller of 2010. Over 70,000 copies have been sold so far.

In April 2011 the band visited Jamaica where they worked in the legendary Bob Marley's studio, Tuff Gong in Kingston, with the best known reggae artist on minialbum Jamaican Trip. Released in June 2011 and completed with DVD containing behind-the-scenes footage and music videos, placed third in OLiS chart.

On July 9, 2011, Star Guard Muffin appeared on Billboard magazine's Uncharted list of at number four. The same month, the band performed at Jarocin Festival. In August 2011, they appeared at Ostróda Reggae Festiwal and received an award of magazine Free Colours for the debut of the year.

In February 2012, it was announced that bassist Kuba Wojciechowski decided to leave Star Guard Muffin and the band was suspended. Kamil Bednarek decided to continue playing with keyboardist Radosław Szyszkowski and drummer Maciej Pilarz under the band name Bednarek, and the line-up was completed by guitarist Piotr Bielawski and bassist Piotr Stanclik.

== Discography ==
=== Studio albums ===
Title	Album details	Peak chart positions
Title	Album details	POL
Szanuj	Released: 19 November 2010; Label: Lou & Rocked Boys	1

=== Extended plays ===
Title	Album details	Peak chart positions
Title	Album details	POL
Ziemia Obiecana	Released: 2009	—
Jamaican Trip	Released: 24 June 2011; Label: Lou & Rocked Boys	3
"—" denotes a recording that did not chart or was not released in that territory.
