= Rules Changed Up =

Studio album by Piotr Lisiecki
- Released: 27 April 2011
- Genre: Alternative rock, folk, blues
- Label: EMI Music

Singles from Rules Changed Up
- 1. "Gra o wszystko" Released: 27 April 2011

Rules Changed Up is the debut studio album by Polish recording artist Piotr Lisiecki. It was released by EMI Music on 27 April 2011. One week later, it placed eighth in Polish official sales chart.

== Track listing ==
Track listing taken from official album booklet.

1. "Cała moja"
2. "Gra o wszystko"
3. "Skazani na siebie"
4. "Ikar płonie"
5. "To miasto jest złe"
6. "Każda chwila sprawia radość"
7. "Tam gdzie cichną rozmowy"
8. "Lost" (Anouk's cover)
9. "Ain't no sunshine" (Withers' cover)
10. "Jolene" (Parton's cover)
