= Mój Świat =

Studio album by Piotr Karpienia
- Released: 15 May 2012
- Recorded: 2011
- Genre: Pop, Rock
- Label: Sony Music Poland

Singles from Mój Świat
- 1. "Zagubiona"

Mój Świat is the debut studio album by Polish singer-songwriter Piotr Karpienia featuring Polish composer Witold Cisło. It is set for release on 15 May 2012 under Sony Music Poland. The album will be promoted with the first single called "Zagubiona".

== Track listing ==
No.	Title	Length
1.	"Angel"
2.	"Zagubiona"
3.	"To Jest Mój Świat"
4.	"I Surrender Now"
5.	"Przyjdź, Jeśli Chcesz"
6.	"All I Need"
7.	"W Pościeli z Łez"
8.	"Love You Forever"
9.	"California Morning"
10.	"Follow Your Dreams"
