= Ania Teliczan (album) =

Studio album by Ania Teliczan
- Released: 16 January 2012
- Recorded: 2010–2011
- Genre: Rock'n'roll, R&B, jazz, pop
- Length: 34:48
- Label: Sony Music Poland
- Producer: Troy Miller

Singles from Ania Teliczan
- 1. "One True Lover" Released: January 2012

Ania Teliczan is the self-titled debut studio album from Polish singer-songwriter Ania Teliczan. It was released on 16 January 2012 and consists of 10 songs in style of 60's in English and Polish, some of which written by Andrzej Piaseczny and Teliczan herself. The album was recorded in the United Kingdom with producer Troy Miller, who previously worked with Amy Winehouse.

== Track listing ==
No.	Title	Length
1.	"Między Nami"	3:00
2.	"Miłość albo Śmierć"	4:10
3.	"Can't You Get Enough"	3:06
4.	"One True Lover"	3:47
5.	"Miłość To Muzyka"	3:16
6.	"Był Taki Ktoś"	3:09
7.	"Tomorrow"	3:36
8.	"For Your Love"	3:20
9.	"K"	4:15
10.	"Nie Znasz Dnia"	3:09

== Charts ==
Chart	Peak position
Polish Albums Chart	39

== Release history ==
Region	Date	Format	Label
Poland	16 January 2012	Digital download, CD	Sony Music
