= Marcin Prokop =

Polish journalist and television and radio personality

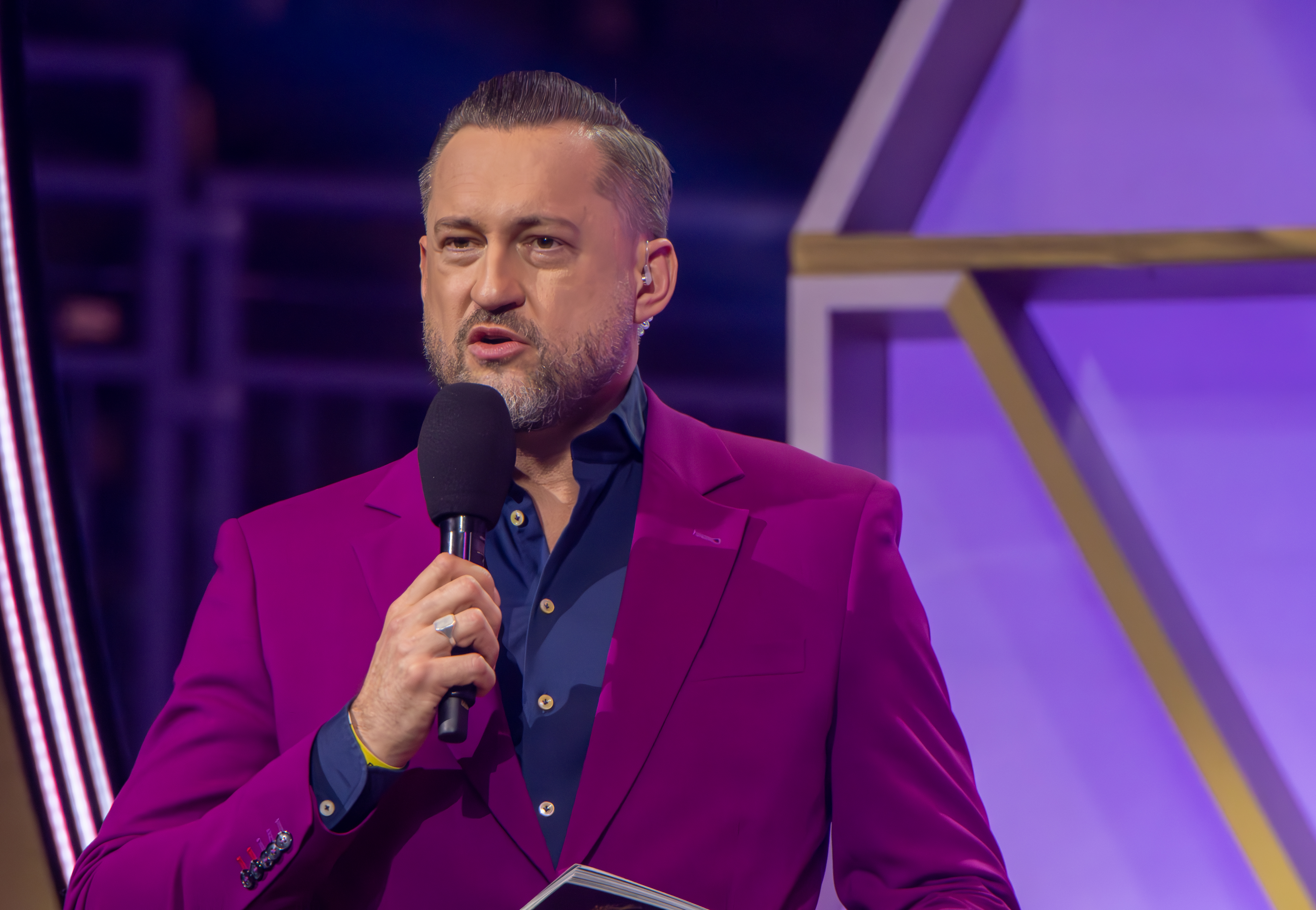
- Marcin Prokop in 2024
- Born: 14 July 1977 (age 49); Warsaw, Poland
- Occupations: Television presenter, journalist
- Years active: 1997–present

Marcin Prokop (born 14 July 1977) is a Polish journalist, television and radio personality. On TVN Turbo he was the presenter of Automaniak. In the years 2008-2022 he hosted the entertainment program Poland's Got Talent and since 2024 he has been a judge in the program. He hosted Good Morning TVN program.
