= Robert Kozyra =

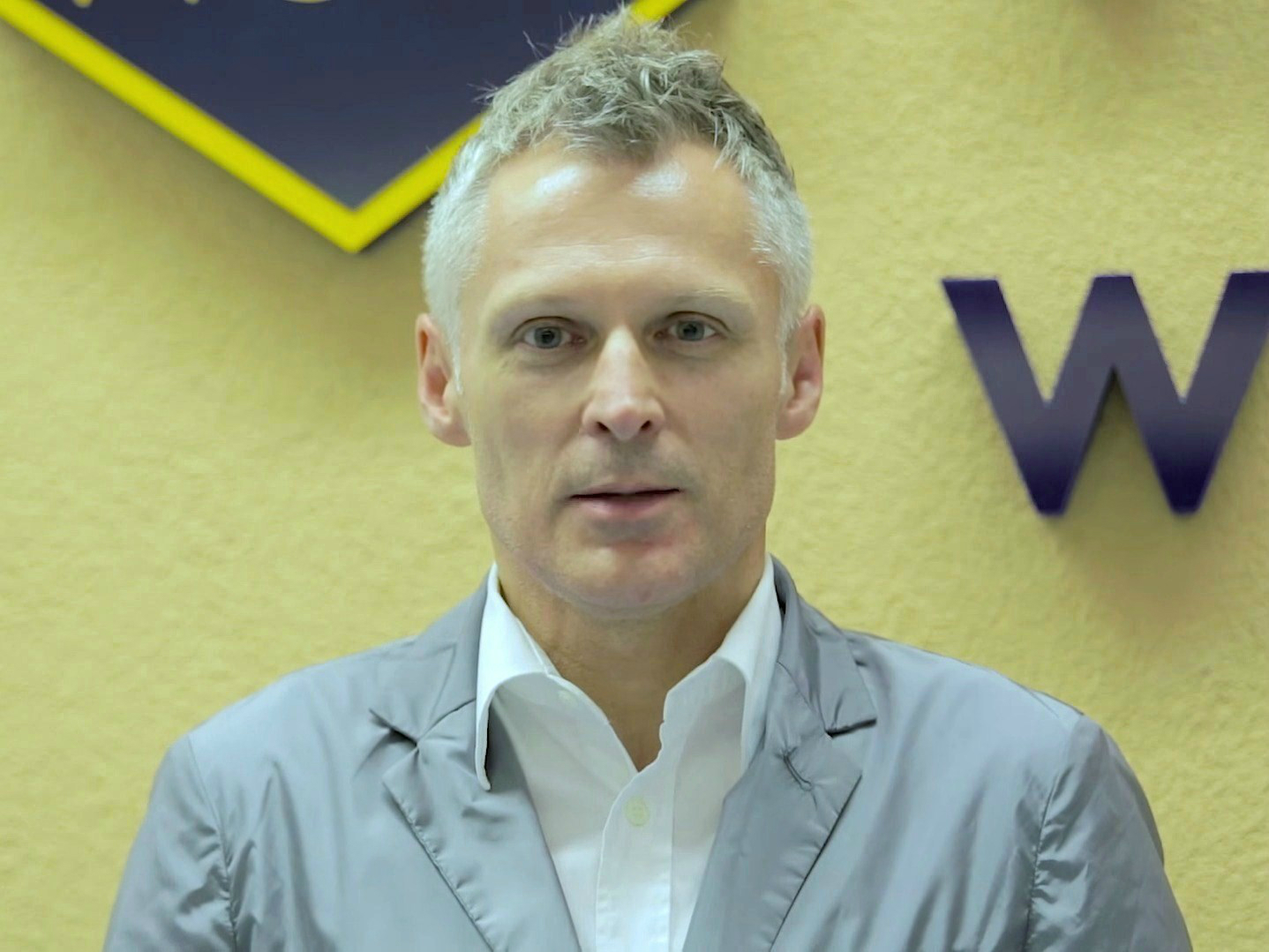

Background information
- Birth name: Robert Tadeusz Kozyra
- Born: 1968; Koszalin, Poland
- Origin: Poznań, Poland
- Occupation(s): Radio presenter, Music manager, Music critic
- Years active: 1995–present

Robert Tadeusz Kozyra (born 1968) between 1995 and 2009 was the program director and then from 2000 to 2009 executive of Radio Zet. In 2008 he founded radio Chilli Zet. In 2011 he was announced as judge on the fourth series of Poland's Got Talent where he replaced Kuba Wojewódzki.
