= Małgorzata Foremniak =

Polish actress (born 1967)

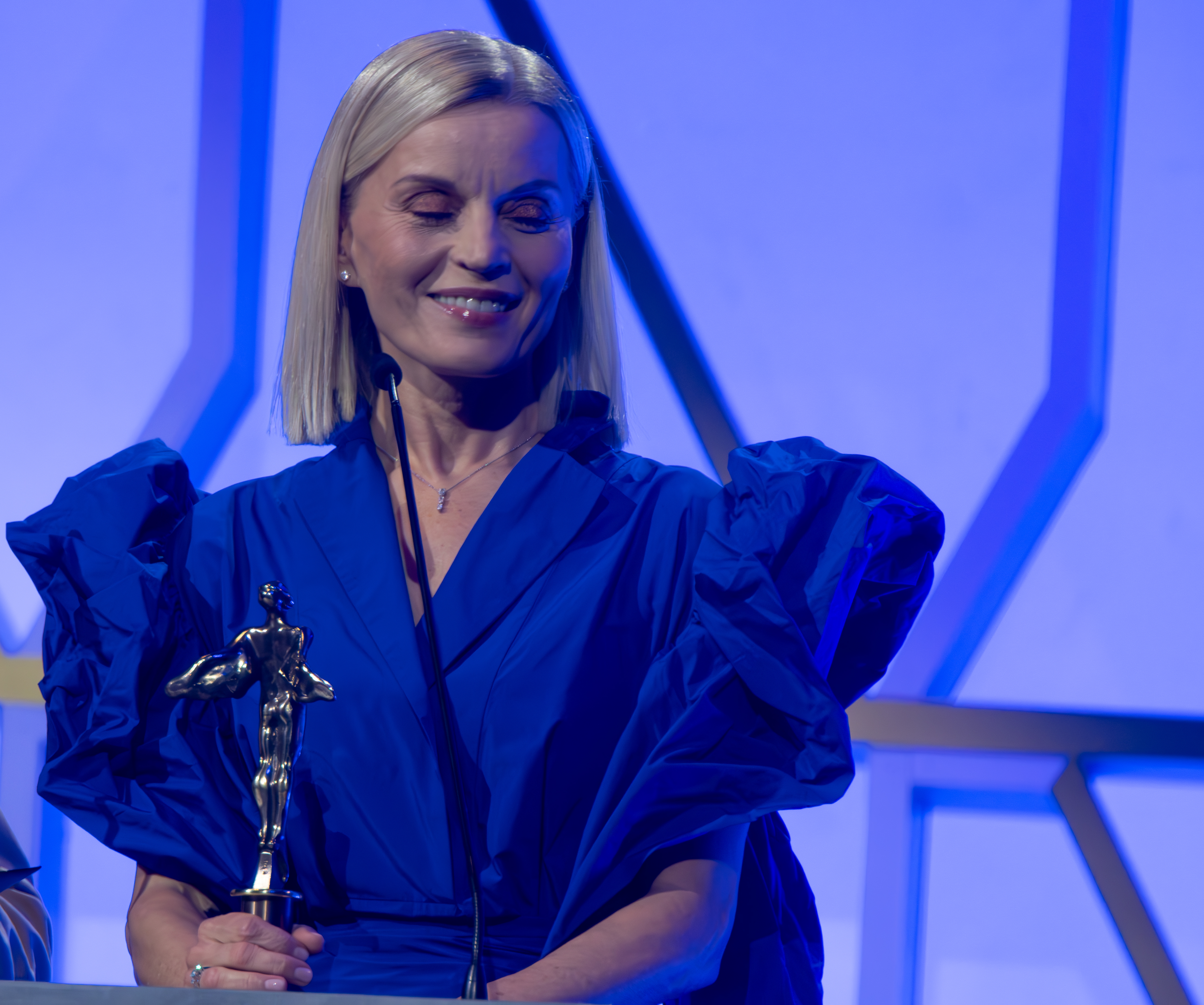
- Foremniak in 2024
- Born: 8 January 1967 (age 59); Radom, Poland
- Occupation: Actress
- Years active: 1987–present

Małgorzata Irena Foremniak (Polish pronunciation: [mawɡɔˈʐata fɔˈrɛmɲak]; born 8 January 1967 in Radom) is a Polish actress. She has appeared in the Polish TV series Na dobre i na złe as Zofia Stankiewicz-Burska up to 2011 and she has played the role of Ash in Avalon. She took part in Taniec z gwiazdami on TVN. She was a judge in the Polish edition of Got Talent, called Mam talent!.
