= Agnieszka Chylińska =

Polish singer

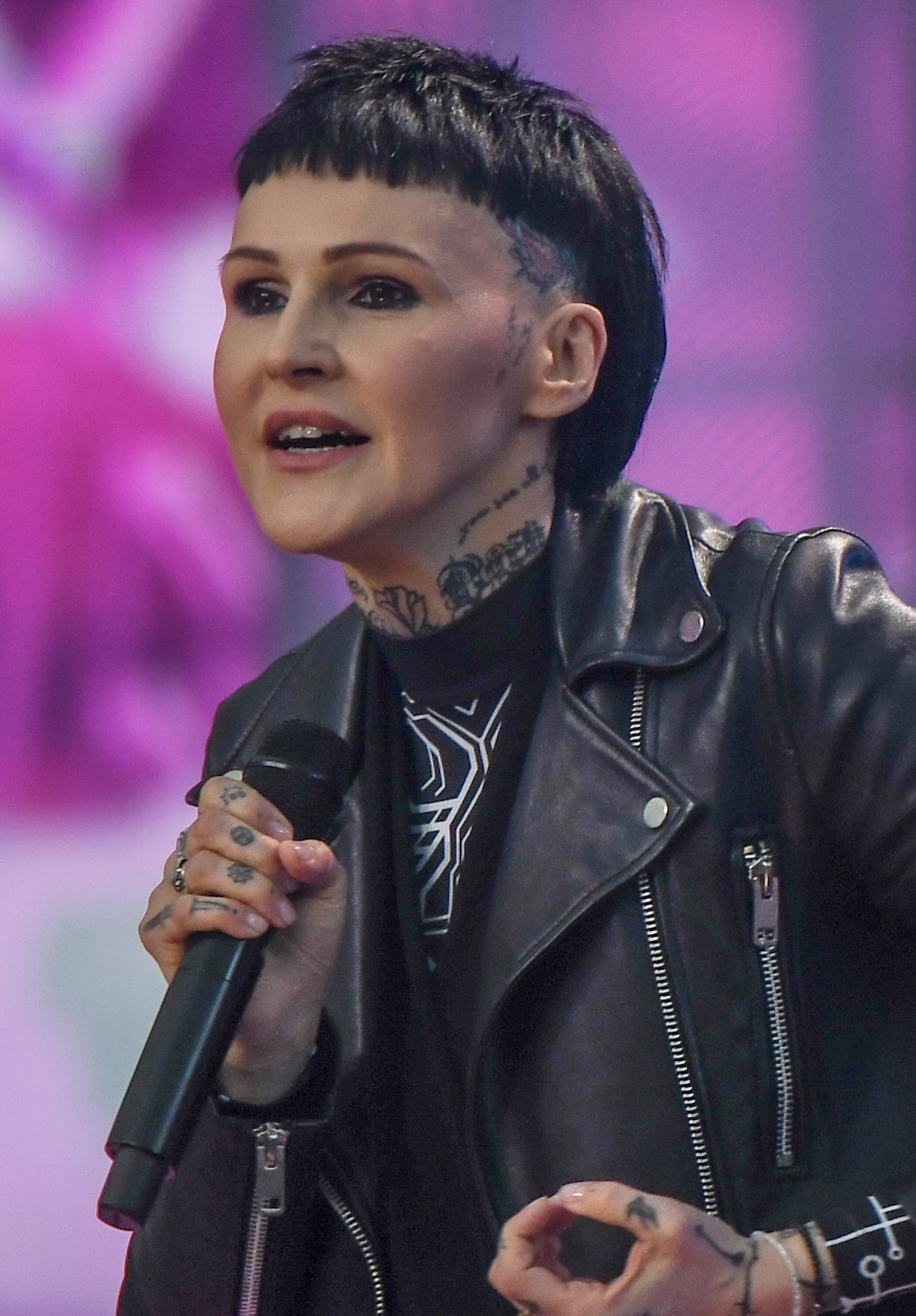
- Chylińska in 2023

Background information
- Genres: Rock; heavy metal; pop rock; hard rock; pop; dance-pop; electronic
- Occupation: Singer
- Instrument: Vocals
- Years active: 1994–present
- Labels: EMI Music Poland, Warner Music Poland
- Formerly of: O.N.A.
- Website: chylinska.com

Agnieszka Chylińska is a Polish singer And songwriter.

From 1994 to 2003, she was the vocalist for the Polish rock band O.N.A. Since 2003 she has performed as Chylińska and in 2004 she released an album titled Winna. Since 2008 she has been a judge on the Polish version of the Got Talent franchise called Mam talent!. In 2009, she released a studio album Modern Rocking, then Forever Child (2016), Pink Punk (2018) and Never Ending Sorry (2022).

== Discography ==
=== Studio albums ===
Title	Album details	Peak chart positions		Certifications
Title	Album details	POL	SWE	Certifications
Winna (as Chylińska)	Released: 22 March 2004; Label: Pomaton EMI; Formats: CD, digital download	2	—	
Modern Rocking	Released: 26 October 2009; Label: EMI Music Poland; Formats: CD, digital download	1	—	ZPAV: Platinum
Forever Child	Released: 30 September 2016; Label: Warner Music Poland; Formats: CD, LP, digital download	1	44	ZPAV: 3× Platinum
Pink Punk	Released: 26 October 2018; Label: Warner Music Poland; Formats: CD, LP, digital download	2	—	ZPAV: Gold
Never Ending Sorry	Released: 28 October 2022; Label: Sony Music Entertainment Poland; Formats: CD, digital download	1	—	ZPAV: 2× Platinum
"—" denotes a recording that did not chart or was not released in that territory.

=== Live albums ===
Title	Album details	Peak chart positions
Title	Album details	POL
25 lat Agnieszki Chylińskiej i Pol'and'Rock	Released: 6 December 2019; Label: Złoty Melon; Formats: CD, DVD, 2×LP, digital download	14

=== Singles ===
Title	Year	Peak chart positions					Certifications	Album
Title	Year	POL Air.	POL New	POL TV	POL Stream.	POL Billb.	Certifications	Album
"Nie mogę Cię zapomnieć"	2009	55	2	—	28	25		Modern Rocking
"Zima"	2010	—	—	—	*			Modern Rocking
"Wybaczam Ci"	2010	—	1	2	*			Modern Rocking
"Niebo"	2010	—	2	—	*			Modern Rocking
"Kiedy przyjdziesz do mnie"	2014	—	—	—	*			Forever Child
"Against All Odds (Take a Look at Me Now)" (with LemON)	2015	—	2	—	*			25 lat RMF FM
"Królowa łez"	2016	1	3	4	*		ZPAV: Diamond	Forever Child
"KCACNL"	2017	28	1	—	*		ZPAV: Gold	Forever Child
"Mam zły dzień"	2018	—	—	—	*			Pink Punk
"Schiza"	2019	—	—	—	*			Pink Punk
"Kiedy powiem sobie dość"	2019	—	—	—	*			25 lat Agnieszki Chylińskiej i Pol'and'Rock
"Winna"	2019	—	—	—	*			25 lat Agnieszki Chylińskiej i Pol'and'Rock
"Jest nas więcej"	2022	23	1	—	*	—		Never Ending Sorry
"Kiedyś do Ciebie wrócę"	2022	3	2	—	24	16	ZPAV: Diamond	Never Ending Sorry
"Drań"	2023	14	*		—	—	ZPAV: Platinum	Never Ending Sorry
"Kochaj ją"	2023	22	*		—	—		Never Ending Sorry
"Ja Ci wszystko dam"	2023	—	*		—	—		Never Ending Sorry
"—" denotes a recording that did not chart or was not released in that territory. "*" denotes the chart did not exist at that time.

== Music videos ==
Title	Year	Director(s)	Ref.
"Winna"	2004	Unknown	
"Niczyja"	2004	Unknown	
"Zmysłowa"	2004	Unknown	
"Nie mogę Cię zapomnieć"	2009	Jacek Kościuszko	
"Wybaczam Ci"	2010	Jacek Kościuszko	
"Niebo"	2010	Jacek Kościuszko	
"Kiedy przyjdziesz do mnie"	2014	Dariusz Szermanowicz	
"Królowa łez"	2016	Adam Gawenda	
"Mam zły dzień"	2018	Tadeusz Śliwa	
"Schiza"	2019	Adam Gawenda	
"Jest nas więcej"	2022	Adam Gawenda	
"Kiedyś do Ciebie wrócę"	2022	Adam Gawenda	
"Drań"	2023	Adam Gawenda	
"Kochaj ją"	2023	Adam Gawenda	
"Ja Ci wszystko dam"	2023	Adam Gawenda	
