= List of honorary citizens of Warsaw =

Coat of arms of Warsaw

Recipients of the honorary citizenship of Warsaw (Polish: Honorowi Obywatele miasta stołecznego Warszawy), in order of date of presentation.

== List ==
| Date | Name | Notes |
|---|---|---|
| 1918 | Józef Piłsudski (1867–1935) | Statesman, Chief of State (1918–1922), First Marshal of Poland (from 1920) and the de facto leader (1926–35) of the Second Polish Republic |
| 1919 | Ignacy Jan Paderewski (1860–1941) | Pianist and composer, a spokesman for Polish independence, Prime Minister of Poland |
| | Józef Haller (1873–1960) | Lieutenant general of the Polish Army, political and social activist |
| 1920 | Maxime Weygand (1867–1965) | French military commander in World War I and World War II |
| | Lucjan Żeligowski (1865–1947) | Polish general, politician, military commander and veteran of World War I, the Polish-Soviet War and World War II |
| 1921 | Herbert Hoover (1874–1964) | American engineer, businessman, and politician who served as the 31st president of the United States (1929–1933) |
| 1923 | Ferdinand Foch (1851–1929) | French general and military theorist, the Supreme Allied Commander during the First World War |
| 1924 | Marie Skłodowska-Curie (1867–1934) | Physicist and chemist who conducted pioneering research on radioactivity, a two-time Nobel Prize laureate |
| 1929 | Eugenia Kierbedź (1855–1946) | Social activist and philanthropist |
| 1992 | Stanisław Broniewski (1915–2000) | Economist, Chief Scouts of the Gray Ranks and Second lieutenant of the Home Army during the World War II |
| | Aleksander Gieysztor (1916–1999) | Medievalist historian |
| | Janina Porczyńska (1927–2009) | Art collector, co-founder of the Museum of John Paul II Collection |
| | Zbigniew Porczyński (1919–1998) | Art collector, co-founder of the Museum of John Paul II Collection |
| | Jerzy Waldorff (1910–1999) | Media personality, public intellectual and music critic |
| 1993 | Jan Podolski (1904–1998) | Engineer, recipient of an honorary doctorate from the Warsaw University of Technology, a proponent for the construction of the Warsaw Metro |
| | Sue Ryder (1924–2000) | British volunteer with Special Operations Executive in the Second World War, who afterwards led many charitable organisations, notably the charity named in her honour |
| 1994 | Juliusz Wiktor Gomulicki (1909–2006) | Essayist and varsavianist |
| 1995 | Stanisław Jankowski (1911–2002) | Polish resistance fighter during World War II, and an architect who played a prominent role in the post-war reconstruction of Warsaw |
| | Kazimierz Leski (1912–2000) | Polish engineer, fighter pilot, and an officer in World War II Home Army's intelligence and counter-intelligence |
| 1996 | John Paul II (1920–2005) | Head of the Catholic Church and sovereign of the Vatican City State from 1978 to 2005 |
| 1999 | Władysław Bartoszewski (1922–2015) | Politician, social activist, journalist, writer and historian |
| | Ryszard Kaczorowski (1919–2010) | Statesman, the last President of Poland in exile (1989–1990) |
| | Franciszek Kamiński (1902–2000) | Polish general |
| | Stefan Starzyński (1893–1939) | Statesman, economist, military officer and Mayor of Warsaw before and during the Siege of 1939 |
| 2000 | Józef Glemp (1929–2013) | Cardinal of the Roman Catholic Church and Archbishop of Warsaw from 1981 to 2006 |
| 2001 | Marek Edelman (1919–2009) | Political and social activist and cardiologist, the last surviving leader of the Warsaw Ghetto Uprising |
| 2003 | Jan Nowak-Jeziorański (1914–2005) | Journalist, writer, politician and social worker; head of the Polish section of Radio free Europe |
| | Zdzisław Peszkowski (1918–2007) | Polish Roman Catholic priest and one of the survivors of the Katyn massacre |
| | Marek Kwiatkowski (1930–2016) | Historian of art |
| 2004 | Kazimierz Jan Majdański (1916–2007) | Polish Roman Catholic Bishop |
| | Jerzy Majewski (1925–2019) | Engineer and politician, Mayor of Warsaw (1967–1982) |
| | Kazimierz Romaniuk (1927–2025) | Polish Roman Catholic priest, and professor of biblical studies |
| | Szymon Szurmiej (1923−2014) | Actor, director, and general manager of the Ester Rachel Kamińska and Ida Kamińska State Jewish Theater in Warsaw |
| 2005 | Sławoj Leszek Głódź (born 1945) | Polish prelate of the Catholic Church and Archbishop of Gdańsk since 2008 |
| | Norman Davies (born 1939) | British-Polish historian |
| 2006 | Wacław Karłowicz (1907−2007) | Polish Roman Catholic priest, chaplain during the Warsaw Uprising |
| | Zofia Korbońska (1915−2010) | Resistance fighter and journalist |
| | Barbara Wachowicz (1937–2018) | Writer, journalist, photographer and publicist |
| 2007 | Janusz Brochowicz-Lewiński (1920–2017) | Home Army officer during World War II |
| | Wiesław Chrzanowski (1923–2012) | Lawyer and politician, Home Army soldier |
| | Czesław Cywiński (1926–2010) | President of the Association of Home Army Soldiers |
| | Hilary Koprowski (1916–2013) | Virologist and immunologist who demonstrated the world's first effective live polio vaccine |
| | Irena Sendler (1910–2008) | Humanitarian, social worker, and nurse who served in the Polish Underground Resistance during World War II in German-occupied Warsaw and saved hundreds of Jewish children from the Holocaust, recognised by the State of Israel as Righteous Among the Nations |
| | Lech Wałęsa (born 1943) | Statesman, dissident, and Nobel Peace Prize laureate, leader of the Solidarity Movement, the first democratically elected president of Poland from 1990 to 1995 |
| 2008 | Simcha Rotem (1924–2018) | Polish-Israeli veteran, member of the Jewish underground in Warsaw, one of the last two surviving Jewish fighters in the Warsaw Uprising and the last surviving fighter from the 1943 Warsaw Ghetto Uprising |
| | Zbigniew Ścibor-Rylski (1917–2018) | Polish brigadier general and aviator, participant of the Warsaw Uprising during the World War II |
| | Stefan Bałuk (1914–2014) | Polish general and photographer |
| | Erwin Axer (1917–2012) | Theatre director, writer and university professor |
| | Józef Zawitkowski (born 1938) | Polish Roman Catholic priest, poet and composer |
| 2009 | Dalajlama XIV (born 1935) | Tibetan religious leader |
| | Witold Pilecki (1901–1948) | Polish cavalry officer, intelligence agent, and resistance leader, author of Pilecki's Report |
| | Tadeusz Mazowiecki (1927–2013) | Author, journalist, philanthropist and Christian-democratic politician, one of the leaders of the Solidarity movement, and the first non-communist Polish prime minister since 1946 |
| | Michał Jan Sumiński (1915–2011) | Traveller, zoologist and journalist |
| 2010 | Lech Kaczyński (1949–2010) | Lawyer, Mayor of Warsaw and the President of Poland (2005–2010) |
| | Ziuta Hartman (1922–2015) | Resistance fighter during World War II |
| | Aleksander Kwaśniewski (born 1954) | Polish politician and journalist, President of Poland from 1995 to 2005 |
| | Henryk Skarżyński (born 1954) | Physician and audiologist, founder of the World Hearing Center in Kajetany |
| | Maria Stypułkowska-Chojecka (1926–2016) | Pedagogue, resistance activist during World War II |
| 2011 | Lidia Korsakówna (1934–2013) | Theater and film actress |
| | Jerzy Buzek (born 1940) | Polish politician and Member of the European Parliament from Poland, Prime Minister of Poland from 1997 to 2001, President of the European Parliament between 2009 and 2012 |
| | Henryk Hoser (1942–2021) | Polish prelate of the Catholic Church |
| 2012 | Witold Kieżun (1922–2021) | Polish economist, former soldier of the Home Army – the Polish resistance movement against German occupation during World War II, participant of the Warsaw uprising and prisoner in the Soviet Gulags |
| | Sławomir Pietras (born 1943) | Theatre director |
| | Jerzy Regulski (1924–2015) | Economist and politician |
| | Stanisław Wyganowski (1919–2017) | Economist and urbanist, Mayor of Warsaw from 1990 to 1994 |
| 2013 | Maria Janion (1926–2020) | Scholar, critic and theoretician of literature as well as feminist |
| | Irena Santor (born 1934) | Singer, musical performer and actress |
| | Zbigniew Romaszewski (1940–2014) | Politician and human rights activist |
| 2014 | Jan Olszewski (1930–2019) | Polish conservative lawyer and politician who served as the Prime Minister of Poland for five months between December 1991 and early June 1992 |
| | Jerzy Owsiak (born 1953) | Journalist and social campaigner, founder of the Great Orchestra of Christmas Charity (WOSP) |
| | Mieczysław Szostek (1933–2021) | Physician and Professor of Medical Sciences as well as politician |
| 2015 | Andrzej Wajda (1926–2016) | Academy Award-winning film and theatre director |
| | Henryk Samsonowicz (1930–2021) | Historian specializing in medieval Poland, writer, and professor of the University of Warsaw |
| 2016 | Adam Strzembosz (born 1930) | Lawyer, judge, first President of the Supreme Court of Poland (1990–1998) |
| 2017 | Daniel Olbrychski (born 1945) | Actor |
| | Wanda Traczyk-Stawska (born 1927) | Psychologist, resistance activist during World War II, participant of the Warsaw Uprising |
| | Wiesław Johann (born 1939) | Lawyer and journalist, Constitutional Tribunal judge |
| 2018 | Halina Birenbaum (born 1929) | Holocaust survivor, writer, poet, translator and activist |
| | Krystyna Budnicka (born 1932) | Social activist, founder of the Children of the Holocaust Association |
| | Marian Turski (1926–2025) | Historian and journalist |
| | Anna Jakubowska (1875–1948) | Pedagogue and social activist |
| | Janina Ochojska (born 1955) | Astronomer, humanitarian and social activist, Member of the European Parliament (2019–present), founder and director of the Polish Humanitarian Action (1992–present) |
| | Anna Trzeciakowska (born 1927) | Translator of American and English literature |
| | Wojciech Roszkowski (born 1947) | Economic historian and writer |
| 2019 | Paweł Adamowicz (1965–2019) | Polish politician and lawyer, mayor of the city of Gdańsk |
| | Halina Jędrzejewska (born 1926) | Physician and resistance fighter during the Warsaw Uprising |
| | Jerzy Majkowski (1928–2019) | Member of the Polish Underground during the Second World War, participant of the Warsaw Uprising |
| | Paweł Pawlikowski (born 1957) | Academy-Award-winning film director |
| 2020 | Olga Tokarczuk (born 1962) | Writer, activist, psychologist, public intellectual and Nobel Prize laureate |
| | Władysław Findeisen (1926–2023) | Politician, engineer, Professor of Technical Sciences, rector of the Warsaw University of Technology |
| | Wojciech Noszczyk (born 1935) | Scientist, Professor of Medical Sciences and surgeon |
| | Andrzej Rottermund (born 1941) | Historian of art and museologist, Professor of Humanities, director of the Royal Castle in Warsaw (1991–2015) |
| | Wiesław Jan Wysocki (born 1950) | Historian, academic teacher and social activist |
| 2021 | Jolanta Brzeska (1947–2011) | activist |
| | Andrzej Rzepliński (born 1949) | lawyer, Professor of Jurisprudence, human rights expert |
| 2022 | Hanna Gronkiewicz-Waltz (born 1952) | politician and lawyer, former Mayor of Warsaw |
| | Vitali Klitschko (born 1971) | politician and former professional boxer, Mayor of Kyiv |
| 2023 | Janusz Dorosiewicz (born 1939) | film producer, architect and social activist |
| | Juliusz Kulesza (1928–2025) | writer and graphic artist |

== Source(s) ==
- "Sylwetki Honorowych Obywateli m.st. Warszawy". Warsaw City Council (in Polish). Urząd m.st. Warszawy. 4 August 2018.
