= Janina Ochojska =

Polish humanitarian and social activist

Janina Ochojska MEP
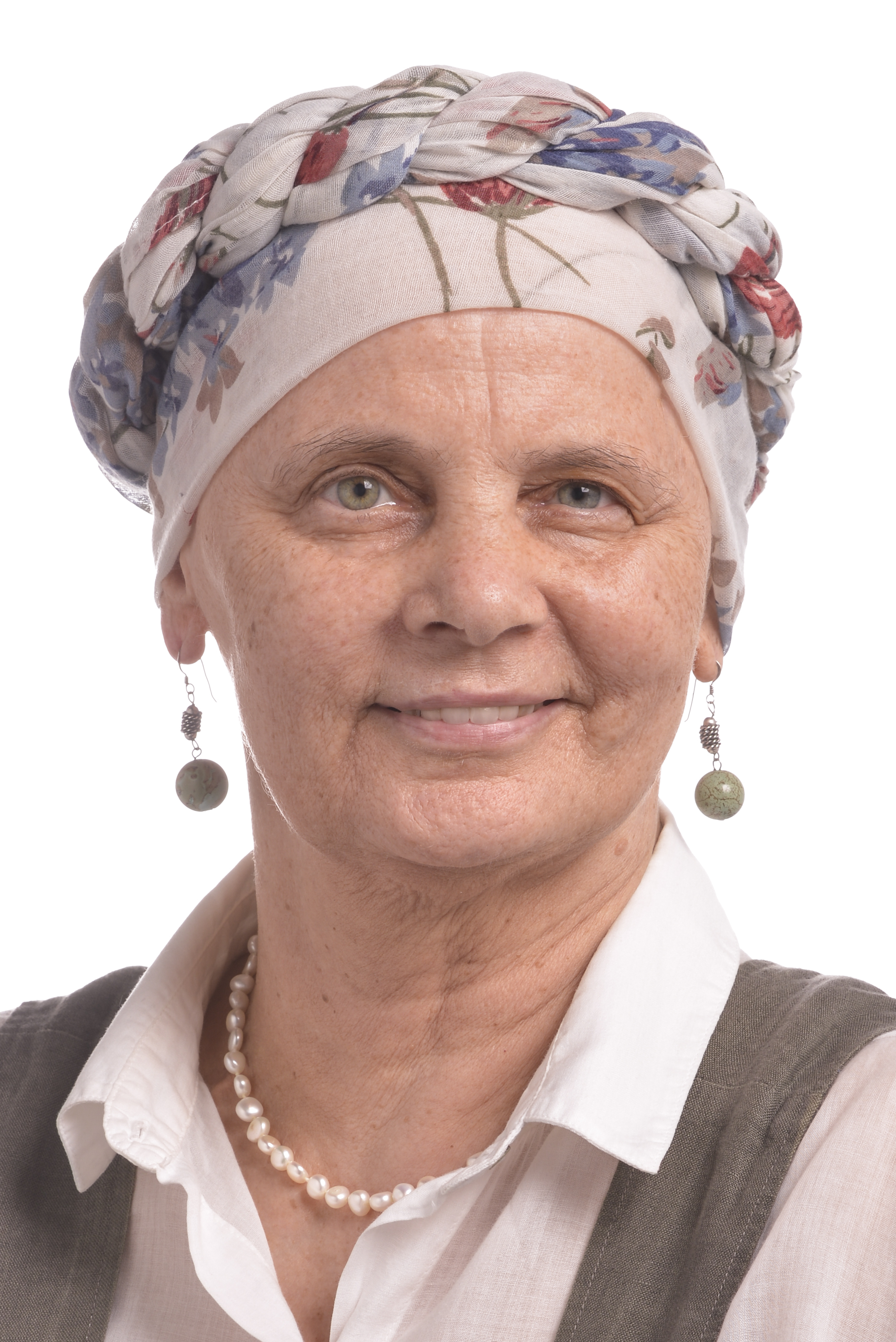

Member of the European Parliament for Lower Silesian and Opole
- In office 2 July 2019 – 15 July 2024

Personal details
- Born: Janina Ochojska; 12 March 1955 (age 71) Gdańsk, Poland
- Party: Independent
- Other political affiliations: Civic Coalition (since 2019); European People's Party (since 2019)
- Spouse: Michał Okoński (m. 1996; div. 2005)
- Education: Nicolaus Copernicus University in Toruń

Janina Maria Ochojska-Okońska (Polish pronunciation: [jaˈɲina ɔˈxɔjska]; born 12 March 1955) is a Polish humanitarian, social activist and astronomer, who serves as a Member of the European Parliament (2019–present). She is founder and director of the Polish Humanitarian Action (PAH) (1992–present).

== Life ==
She graduated from High School No. 1 in Zabrze and from Nicolaus Copernicus University in Toruń.

In 1980, she graduated in astronomy from the Nicolaus Copernicus University in Toruń, until 1984 she worked at the Astrophysics Laboratory at the Polish Academy of Sciences in the Nicholas Copernicus Astronomical Center in Torun. As a student she was active in the Academic Ministry... From the late 1970s, she was associated with the democratic opposition; she cooperated with the independent Social Library of Antoni Stawikowski. She joined "Solidarity", after the introduction of martial law engaged in the distribution of underground publications, as well as the activities of the local committee dealing with the assistance of victims of repression and their families.

She was disabled from early childhood (Polio). As she mentions, she owes acceptance of her disability to a stay at the Treatment and Education Center for Disabled Children, led by doctor Lech Wierusz.

In 1984, she went to France for surgery. There she came across the idea of humanitarian aid. As a volunteer she was active for the EquiLibre foundation, searching for contacts and coordinating assistance for Poland. In 1989, she was one of the founders of the Polish branch of the EquiLibre Foundation. In 1992 she organized a convoy of Polish aid for the former Yugoslavia. In 1992, she also founded the Polish Humanitarian Action, where she assumed the post of president.

In 1996, she married Michał Okoński, a journalist from Tygodnik Powszechny, but the marriage ended in divorce. In 2000, an extended interview with Janina Ochojska was conducted by Wojciech Bonowicz and published as a book (Heaven is different), then in 2015 another one, conducted by Marzena Zdanowska (The World According to Janka).

== Awards and honours ==
- Honorary Citizen of Warsaw (2018)
- Commander's Cross of the Order of Polonia Restituta awarded for outstanding services in building a civil society for achievements in professional and social work undertaken for the benefit of the country (2011)
- Bene Merito honorary badge (2009)
- Józef Tischner Award (2006)
- Legion of Honour (2003)
- Pax Christi International Peace Award (1995)
- Order Ecce Homo
- Order of the Smile

== See also ==
- Great Orchestra of Christmas Charity
- Jerzy Owsiak
