= Mazowsze (folk group) =

Song and dance ensemble

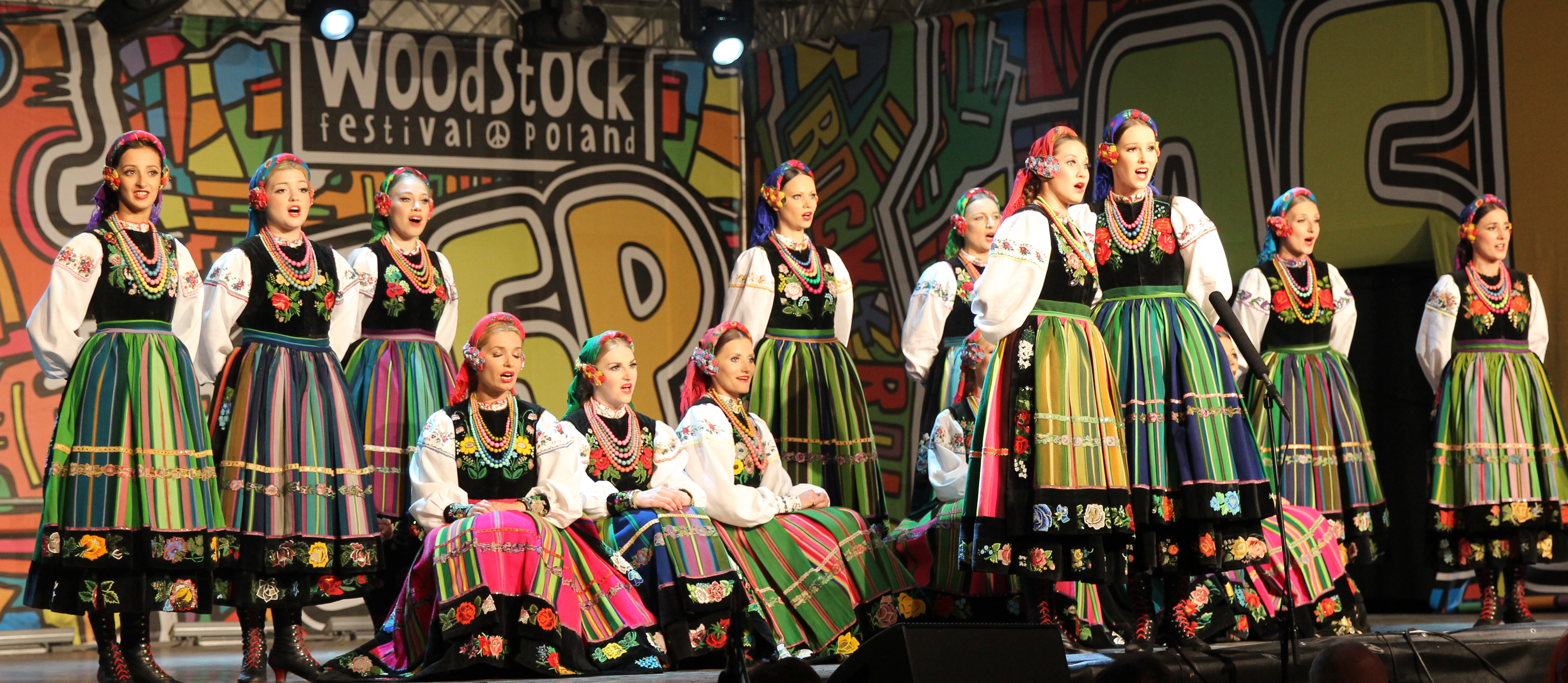
- Mazowsze at Przystanek Woodstock in 2013

Background information
- Origin: Warsaw, Poland
- Genres: folk
- Years active: 8 November 1948–current
- Website: mazowsze.waw.pl

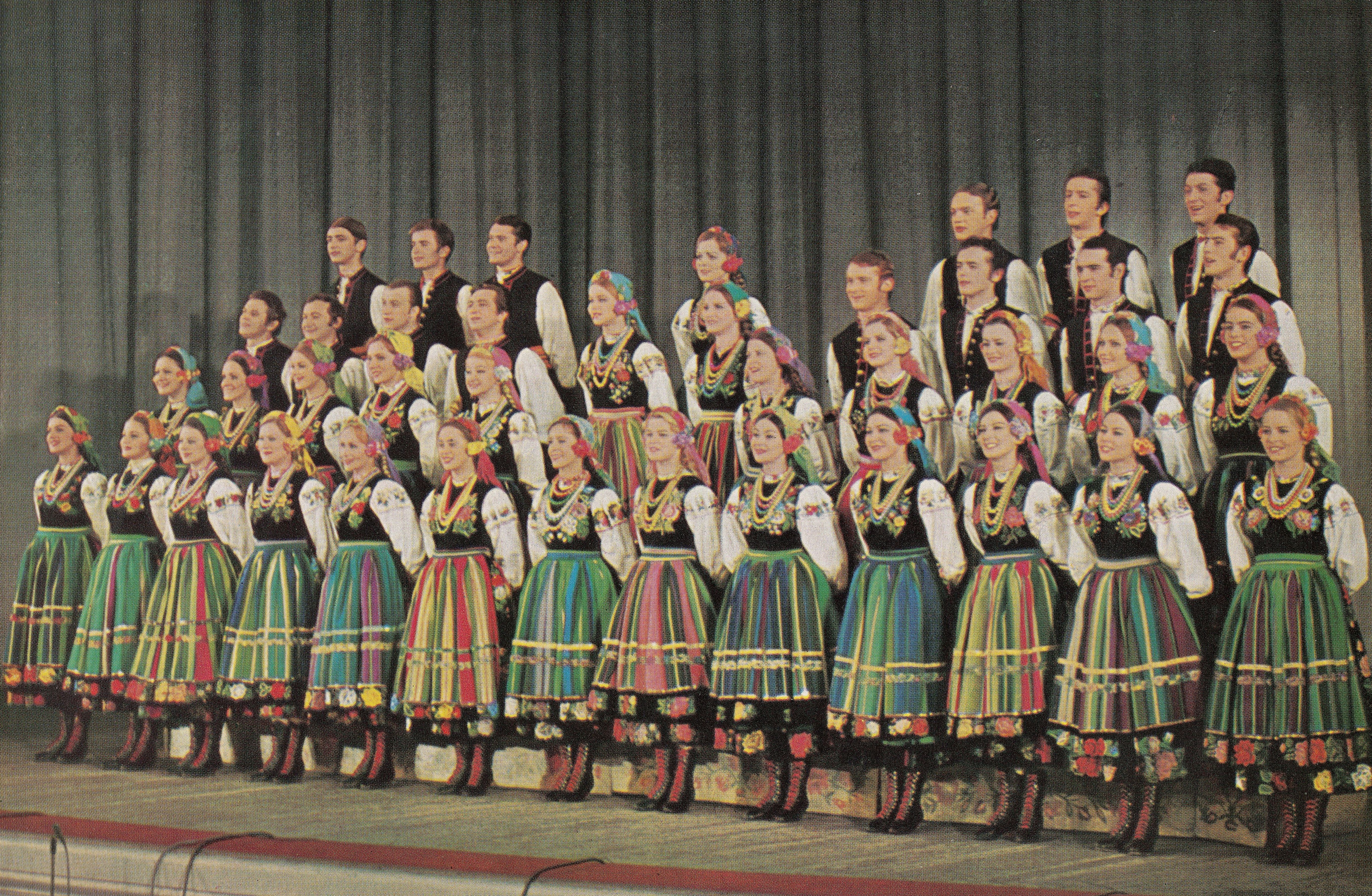
Mazowsze in the 1970s.

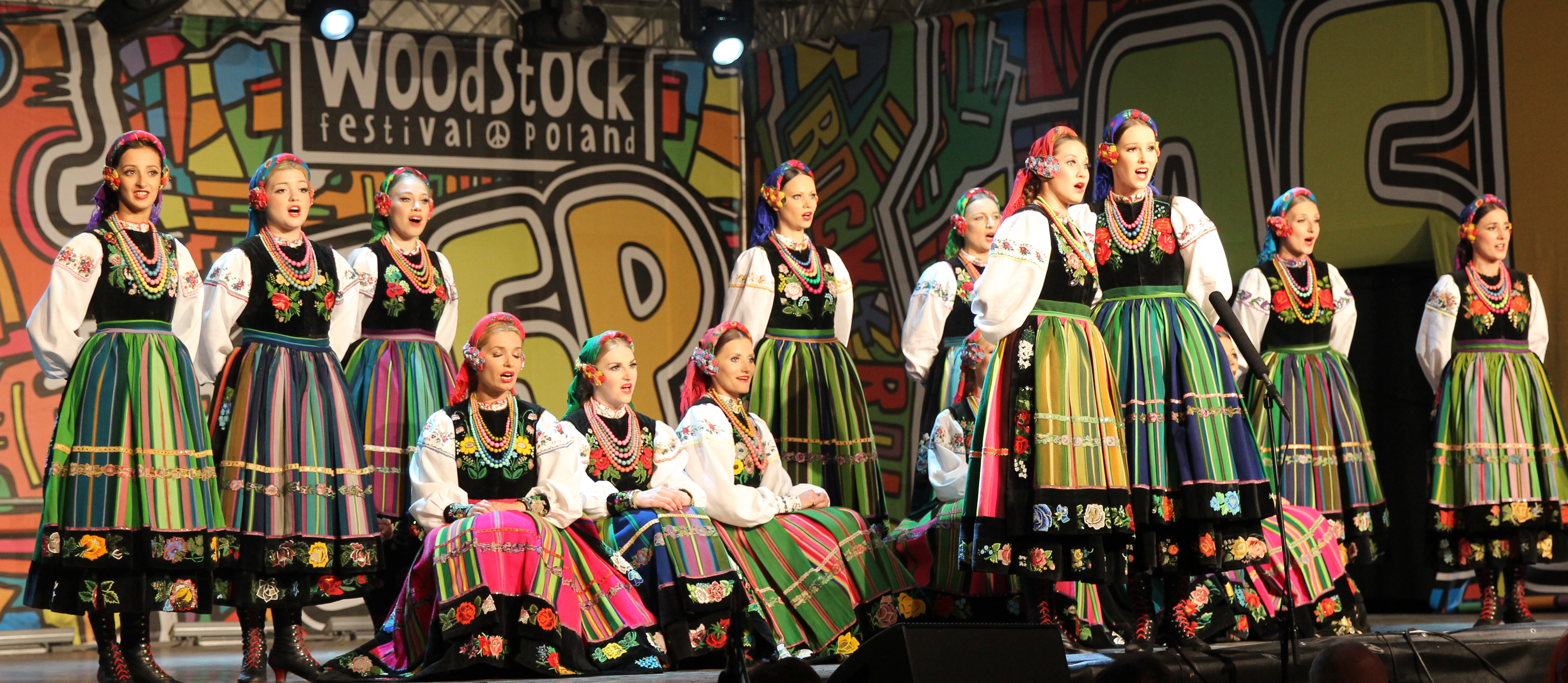
Mazowsze at Przystanek Woodstock in 2013

Mazowsze (Polish: Państwowy Zespół Ludowy Pieśni i Tańca „Mazowsze” im. Tadeusza Sygietyńskiego) – "State Folk Ensemble of Song and Dance 'Mazowsze'") is a famous Polish folk dance and song ensemble. It is named after the Mazowsze region of Poland.

== History ==
Mazowsze was established by a decree issued by the Ministry of Culture and Art on 8 November 1948. The decree ordered Professor Tadeusz Sygietyński to create a folk group that would maintain regional artistic traditions and the traditional folk repertoire of songs and dances of the Masovian countryside. The group was intended to protect this folk tradition from destruction and encapsulate its diversity, beauty and richness. At the beginning Mazowsze's repertoire contained songs and dances from only a few regions of Poland – Opoczno and Kurpie, but it soon extended its range by adopting the traditions of other regions.

After two years of preparing, rehearsing and studying its repertoire, Mazowsze staged its premiere in the Polish Theatre, Warsaw on 6 November 1950. The repertoire contained songs and dances from the regions of Central Poland (as mentioned above) – Opoczno, Kurpie and Masovia.

In between the concerts after the premiere in Warsaw Mazowsze continued to enhance the programme, planned next undertakings and made important decisions. Only year after, in 1951, Mazowsze started touring outside Poland. The first country they visited was the Union of Soviet Socialist Republics, understandable in those days due to Poland's geopolitical situation. Three years later the Polish government allowed Mazowsze to venture outside the “Iron Curtain”. On 1 October 1954 there was a concert in Paris, and six years later in the USA.

After the death of Prof. Tadeusz Sygietyński, the group’s leader became Mira Zimińska-Sygietyńska, who was working beside her husband from the very beginning of Mazowsze. They both researched the countryside, Zimińska looking for old traditional garments, Sygietynski hoping to find young talents. She also made Mazowsze as it is till now. Had it not been for her, it would not be possible to find new areas of research like 39 more ethnographic regions or description of religious and patriotic songs which were never written down. Because of her Mazowsze gained popularity all over the world, gave around 6 thousand concerts as well in Poland as in 49 countries. Mira tried to collect also material treasures of Polish folklore – costumes which were reconstructed with great care.

Mira Zimińska-Sygietyńska was the group's leader for over 40 years, devoting her talent, experience and life to the project completely.

In the fifties, Mazowsze gave the opportunity to sing to such great Polish singers as Irena Santor or Lidia Korsakówna.

== Film appearances ==
In 1954 Mazowsze appeared in the Polish comedy movie Przygoda na Mariensztacie (directed by Leonard Buczkowski).

In 1963 Mazowsze appeared in the Polish comedy movie Żona dla Australijczyka (Wife for an Australian), about an Australian man of Polish descent who returns to Poland to find a wife. The role of the soloist of Mazowsze was played by the famous Polish actress Elżbieta Czyżewska, and the role of the Australian man – Wiesław Gołas.

In 1999 Mazowsze also appeared in Andrzej Wajda’s movie Pan Tadeusz, in the scene of the traditional Polish dance – the Polonaise.

In 2018 Mazowsze appeared in Cold War, the film directed by Paweł Pawlikowski, which features a fictional Polish dance troupe that in many respects shares a similar history to Mazowsze.

== See also ==
- Witold Zapała
