= Irena Santor =

Polish singer and actress

Irena Santor Order of Polonia Restituta Gold Gloria Artis Medal
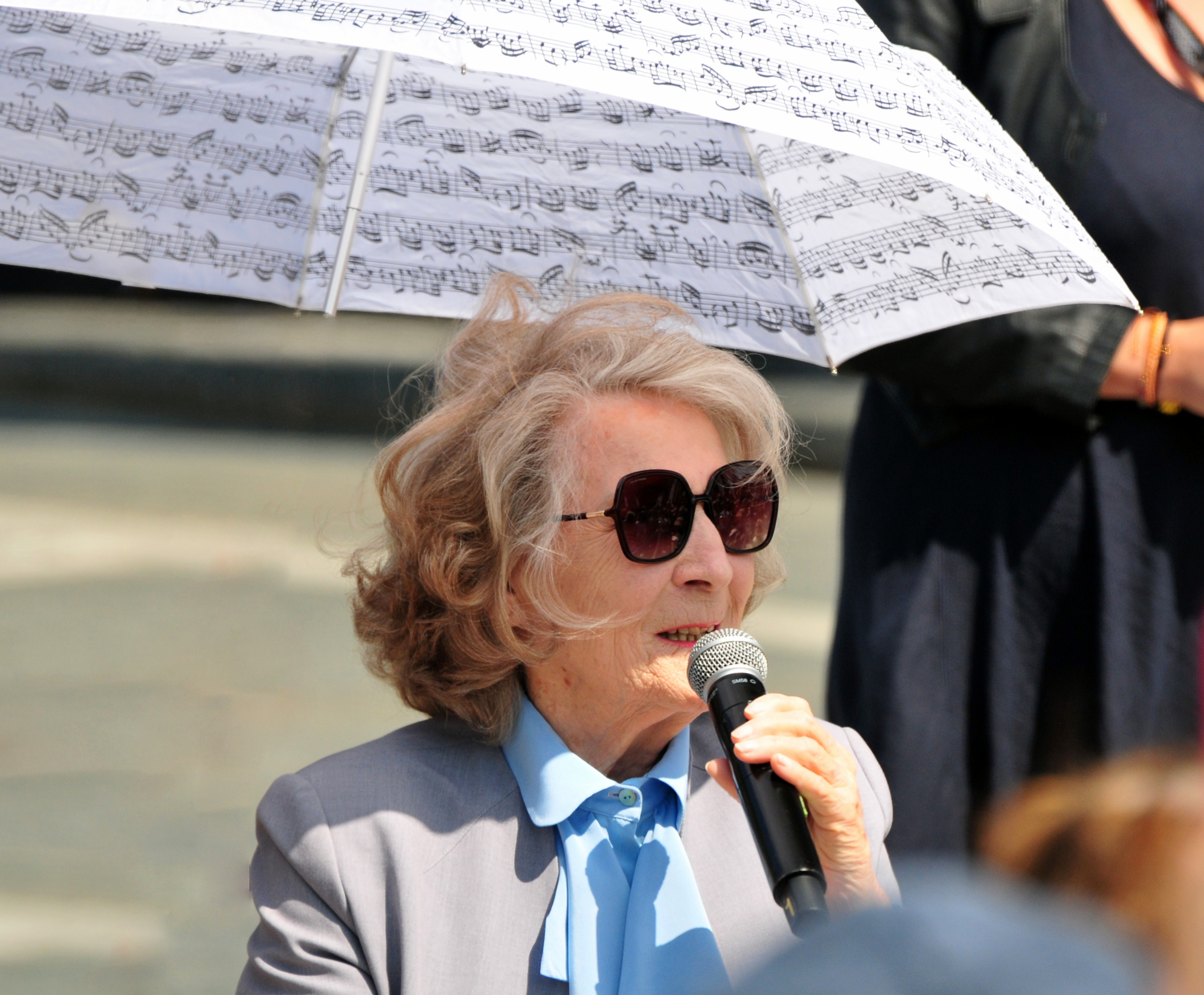
- Santor in 2026
- Born: Irena Wiśniewska; 9 December 1934 (age 91); Papowo Biskupie, Poland
- Occupations: Singer, actress
- Years active: 1951–present
- Spouse: Stanisław Santor (m. 1958; div. 1977)

Irena Wiśniewska-Santor (Polish pronunciation: [iˈrɛna ˈsantɔr]; née Wiśniewska; born 9 December 1934) is a Polish singer, musical performer and actress.

Her career started in 1950. She's noted for singing in clear mezzo-soprano, considered one of Poland's biggest icons and is referred to as an influence for younger singers. From 1951 to 1959 Irena Santor (then Wiśniewska) was a member and the main soloist of the Polish folk group Mazowsze, with whom she toured all continents. After leaving the group she decided to start a solo career. She has been awarded many prizes in Poland and abroad.

Irena Santor made her acting debut in Stanisław Bareja's film Przygoda z piosenką (1968). She appeared in many TV and radio shows and sat on juries for a number of talent shows and song competitions. The singer also recorded soundtracks to Polish and Soviet films.

In 2017, as the first singer in Poland, she was awarded an honorary doctorate for her accomplishments.

In 2021, she announced that she ended her professional career.

== Early life and education ==
Irena Wiśniewska was born on 9 December 1934 in Papowo Biskupie in northern Poland. She spent her childhood in Solec Kujawski, where her family had moved in the mid-1930s. Her father, Bernard Wiśniewski, was murdered by the German Selbstschutz in the autumn of 1939, a few weeks after the start of World War II. Her mother worked as a seamstress.

After the war Irena's mother's health was failing. In 1948, Irena and her mother lived in Polanica-Zdrój, a health resort in Silesia, where Irena attended the Glass Decoration Gymnasium, and then the Vocational School of Glass Industry, in nearby Szczytna. Teachers discovered her vocal talent and at the end of the 1940s sent her to song competitions.

== Career ==
In 1950 she met Zdzisław Górzyński, a prominent director of the Grand Theatre, Poznań, who visited Polanica-Zdrój. Górzyński was impressed with her vocal and recommended her to Tadeusz Sygietyński, who was creator and manager of the folk group Mazowsze. He organised casting and accepted Irena's candidacy but stipulated that she will take singing lessons under the direction of opera singer Wanda Wermińska. She agreed. Her mother died that same year, so Irena moved to the Karolin, where she graduated music school and passed the matura exam. Her classmate in this term was actress Lidia Korsakówna.

She was the main soloist in a folk group Mazowsze. With the group she appeared in the first Polish color movie Przygoda na Mariensztacie (1953) and they recorded soundtrack to movie. In the 1950s she traveled around the world with the band. Later on in her life, Irena Santor revealed that she performed for Mao Zedong, which she regrets now. During that time she met her future husband, Stanisław Santor, who was a violinist in Mazowsze. Her most popular song from this period was Ej, przeleciał ptaszek – originally a folk song.

After her marriage to Stanisław Santor, she left the group and started a solo career.

In 2019 she was celebrating the diamond jubilee of her career with a concert tour called "Jubileusz, śpiewam, czyli jestem" ("Jubilee, I sing, therefore I am").

On November 25, 2024, the "Vistula Sounds" International Festival was officially named after Irena Santor. The event took place at the City Hall in Ciechocinek in the presence of the Artist. Starting with the 4th edition of the event in 2025 the official name will be: Irena Santor "Vistula Sounds" International Festival.The new location for the Irena Santor "Vistula Sounds" International Festival from 2026 is Bydgoszcz.

== Private life ==
In 1958 she married Stanisław Santor. The couple divorced after 19 years, but they remained on good terms until his death in 1999.

Until his death in 2018 her partner was Zbigniew Korpolewski, whom she met in the 1990s.

== Discography ==
- Rendez-vous z I. Santor (1961)
- W krainie piosenki (1963)
- Dzień dobry piosenko (1964)
- Halo Warszawo (1965)
- Piosenki stare jak świat (1966)
- Powrócisz tu (1967)
- Zapamiętaj, że to ja (1969)
- Wśród nocnej ciszy (1969)
- Dla ciebie śpiewa Irena Santor (1970)
- Moja Warszawa (1972)
- Z tobą na zawsze (1972)
- Witaj gwiazdko złota (1972)
- Jubileusz (1973)
- Irena Santor (1976)
- Baśnie Andersena w piosence (1978)
- Irena Santor (Note: Second album titled singer's name.) (1978)
- Telegram miłości (1979)
- C.D.N. (1982)
- Przeboje pana Stanisława (1982)
- Irena Santor w piosenkach Ryszarda Szeremety (1985)
- Biegnie czas (1990)
- Trzeba marzyć (1992)
- Gdy się Chrystus rodzi (1992)
- Piosenki stare jak świat (1993)
- Warszawa ja i ty (1993)
- Miło wspomnieć (1993)
- Złote przeboje (1994)
- Wiara przenosi góry (1995)
- Duety (1996)
- Tych lat nie odda nikt (1997)
- Baśnie Andersena (1997)
- Przeboje Moniuszki (1998)
- Moje Piosenki (1998–2001) – a series of thirteen records with all previous recordings
- Embarras. Złota Kolekcja (1999)
- Santor Cafe (2000)
- Kolory mojej Warszawy (2CD) (2002)
- Jeszcze (2002)
- Tych lat nie odda nikt. Złota Kolekcja (2004)
- Duety / Santor Cafe (2004)
- Embarras / Tych lat nie odda nikt. Złota Kolekcja 10 lat (2008)
- Urodziny Ireny Santor (2010)
- 40 piosenek Ireny Santor, CD1 (2009)
- Kręci mnie ten świat (2010)
- 40 piosenek Ireny Santor, CD2 (2011)
- Delicje z Podwieczorków przy mikrofonie, CD1 (2013)
- Delicje z Podwieczorków przy mikrofonie, CD2 (2013)
- Delicje z Podwieczorków przy mikrofonie, CD3 (2013)
- Zamyślenia (2014)
- Punkt widzenia (2014)

== Filmography ==
Title	Year	Role	Notes
Przygoda na Mariensztacie	1953	member of Mazowsze	she also dubbed main character played by Lidia Korsakówna and with group recorded soundtrack; movie directed by Leonard Buczkowski
Klub kawalerów	1962	–	she dubbed character played by Lidia Korsakówna
Gangsterzy i filantropi	1962	–	main music theme
Przygoda z piosenką	1968	Susanne Blanche	Main cast, movie directed by Stanisław Bareja
M jak miłość	2007	Herself	Polish soap opera, special guest in the 526 episode
Tylko nas dwoje	2010	Herself; Judge	Polish version of Just the Two of Us

== Awards and honors ==
Year	Ceremony	Category	Result	Ref
1962	Dookoła świata	Best Singer	Nominated	
1962	Express Wieczoru	Best Singer	Won	
1963	Express Wieczoru	Best Singer	Won	
1966	Polish Diaspora Award	Singer of the Year	Won	
1966	National Festival of Polish Song in Opole	for the song Powrócisz tu	Won	
1966	Sopot International Song Festival	for the song Powrócisz tu	Third	
1969	Złota Płyta	for the album Piosenki stare jak świat	Won	
1970	Złota Płyta	for the album Zapamiętaj, że to ja	Won	
1971	Złota Płyta	for the album Wśród nocnej ciszy	Won	
1973	Złota Płyta	for the album Z tobą na zawsze	Won	
1974	Silver Cross of Merit (Krzyż Zasługi)		Won	
1976	Gold Cross of Merit (Krzyż Zasługi)		Won	
1998	Krzyż Komandorski Orderu Odrodzenia Polski	for outstanding services for Polish culture, for achievements in artistic work	Won	
2007	Gold Fryderyk	for achievements	Won	
2008	Order of the Smile			
2013	Honorary citizen of Warsaw			
