= Jerzy Owsiak =

Polish journalist and social campaigner (born 1953)

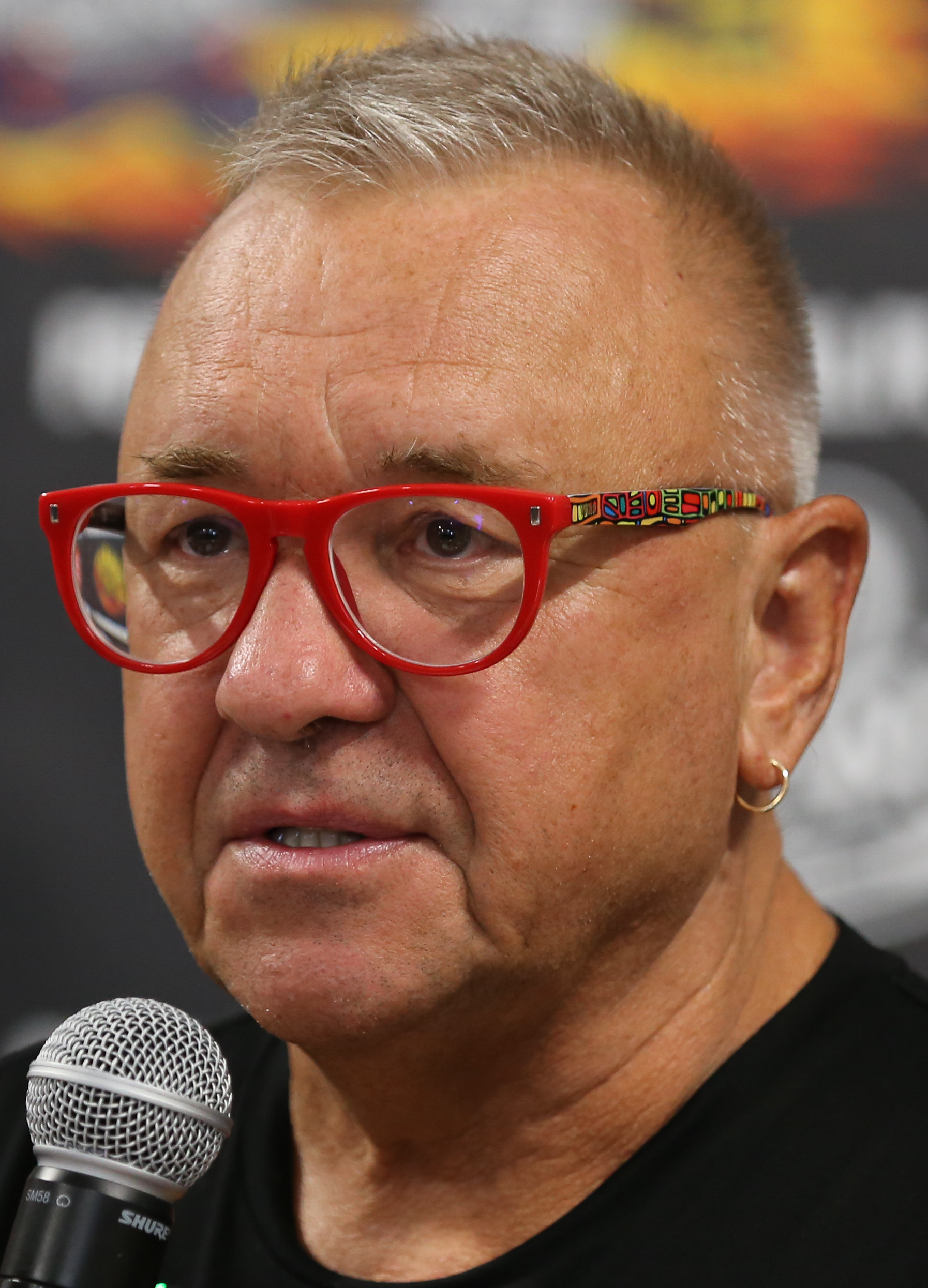
- Owsiak in 2023
- Born: 6 October 1953; Gdańsk, Poland
- Occupations: Journalist, social campaigner
- Known for: Great Orchestra of Christmas Charity; Pol'and'Rock Festival
- Awards: The Peace Summit Medal for Social Activism (2013); Order of Polonia Restituta (2011); Order of the Smile (1993)

Jerzy Zbigniew Owsiak (Polish pronunciation: [ˈjɛʐɨ ˈɔfɕak]; born 6 October 1953) is a Polish journalist and social campaigner. He is the founder of the Great Orchestra of Christmas Charity (WOŚP / Wielka Orkiestra Świątecznej Pomocy), one of the largest non-governmental, non-profit charity organizations in Poland. Owsiak is the main initiator and promoter for the group's Grand Finale, an annual worldwide festival where money is raised for the medical care of children as well as the elderly suffering from various medical conditions. He is also the creator of the annual Pol'and'Rock Festival, formerly known as Przystanek Woodstock ("Woodstock Festival"), the largest annual music festival in Poland, and one of the largest annual music festivals in the world.

Owsiak is married to Lidia Niedźwiedzka-Owsiak, the Medical Affairs Director for WOŚP. He is also a stained glass maker, and has qualifications in psychotherapy.

== Life and activity ==
At the age of eight, Owsiak moved with his parents from Gdańsk to Warsaw. There, he graduated from high school, and later attempted to get enrolled at the Academy of Fine Arts in Warsaw. When he was a teenager, he was involved with the hippie subculture in the Masovian Voivodeship. His fascination with this subculture led to his idea for the Woodstock festival. He is married to Lidia (née Niedźwiecka) who is also a board member of the WOŚP Foundation.

== Art career ==
Due to being acquainted with Wojciech Waglewski, Owsiak became well known in music circles. Since 1988, he has attended Voo Voo concerts. He has performed at some of them with his band, Towarzystwo Przyjaciół Chińskich Ręczników (Society of Friends of Chinese Towels), and he started his programme on the Rozgłośnia Harcerska (the Scout's Radio Station).

After the termination of his work in the Scout's Radio Station, his next undertaking was the broadcast of "Brum". He ran it from 1991 to 1994 in PR Program III. It was only broadcast on Fridays. Between 1994 and 1999, it changed its name to "Się kręci". Later, he undertook the broadcast of "Kręcioła" on Polskie Radio Program I and attended meetings with listeners on Saturday mornings at RMF FM.

Between 1991 and 2007, Owsiak cooperated with Telewizja Polska, a public broadcasting corporation, operating throughout Poland. Since December 1991 he has been preparing a TV programme, "Róbta, co chceta, czyli rockendrollowa jazda bez trzymanki" for TVP2, which was called "Dziura w koszu" from 1994, and from 1996 "Kręcioła".

In 2007 he began working for the radio again. On 4 July 2007 he ran, for the first time, "Dźwiękoszczelny magazyn Jurka Owsiaka" on the WAWA radio station. The show was later broadcast on the Eska Rock radio station, until 4 April 2010. In 2007, he produced the youth channel, O.TV (Owsiak TV), which is available on the Direct-broadcast satellite, n platform.

Owsiak is the co-author of the "Orkiestra Klubu Pomocnych Serc, czyli monolog – wodospad Jurka Owsiaka", a book which comprises an extensive interview made by Bartłomiej Dobroczyński. He also acted in the TV soap opera "Klan" as himself and in "Autoportret z kochanką" by Radosław Piwowarski.

== Organization of concerts ==
At the end of the 1980s and the 1990s, Owsiak was engaged in the organization of many rock concerts. He organized a series of marathon music concerts, which all had a common feature – his characteristic "stammering" announcing, and the participation of the best Polish Punk rock bands of that time. These concerts included:

- Letnia zadyma w środku zimy – in Stodoła club, Warsaw – 27 January 1989 (organization debut), 1991
- Zadyma na Torwarze, Warsaw 1989
- 50 Rock'n'Rolli Na 1 maja – in Fugazzi club, Warsaw 1992
- Warsaw-Berlin 2 Step – Agrykola, Warsaw 1993

In 1991 and 1992 he ran the Jarocin Festival, along with Walter Chełstowski. They also organized the first Przystanek Woodstock in 1995 in Czymanowo near Żarnowiec.

== Great Orchestra of Christmas Charity ==
In 1993, Owsiak founded the Great Orchestra of Christmas Charity, along with Lidia Niedźwiedzka-Owsiak and Bohdan Maruszewski, which is now one of the largest, non-government, non-profit, charities in Poland. The main objective of the charity is "Health Protection and Saving Children's Lives through Providing Medical Equipment to Public Hospitals".

His first fund-raising participation was organised spontaneously after an appeal from the cardio-surgeons from "Centrum Zdrowia Dziecka" ("Children's Memorial Health Institute"), for financial support for the purchase of medical equipment. In 1992, Owsiak invited doctors onto his programme "Brum" broadcast on Polskie Radio Program III, and repeatedly reminded his listeners on every edition about paying money into a given account. This action was also continued during the Jarocin Festival the same year.

There was a lot of positive feedback for these actions, and in March 1993, thanks to the initiative of Owsiak and Walter Chełstowski, GOCC officially came into existence and its first Great Finale was organised on 3 January 1993. Since then, the Great Finale has taken place every year and Owsiak is the main organizer and compere of the TV programme under the same title, broadcast on TVP2. According to a survey by Gazeta Wyborcza it is the most-trusted Polish organization.

== Collaboration with TVP ==
Owsiak split with from TVP after 16 years of cooperation. He ran programmes such as the annual GOCC Great Finale, "Kręcioła", "Bezpieczne Wakacje" and "Róbta co chceta". On 6 October 2007, a new channel on DTH platform n belonging to ITI Group, was launched.

The decision to split with TVP was made by Owsiak because, as he says, his programmes were not broadcast enough, and the Great Finale of this year was limited only to several five-minute-long entries. In 2023, after the 2023 Polish parliamentary election, Owsiak renewed his collaboration the TVP.

== Selected awards ==
- Infantis Dignitatis Defensori (children's rights award) (2018)
- Polonicus Award (2018)
- Plus Ratio Quam Vis Award of the Jagiellonian University (2017)
- Best Concert Promoter Musexpo Award (2015)
- Honorary Citizen of the Capital City of Warsaw (2014)
- Lewiatan Award (2014)
- The Peace Summit Medal for Social Activism (2013)
- Honorary degree of the Pedagogical University of Kraków (2013)
- Commander's Cross of the Order of Polonia Restituta (2011)
- Buzdygan Award (2011)
- Honorary Bene Merito Award (2010)
- Order Ecce Homo (2003)
- Superwiktor Award (2000)
- Knight's Cross of the Order of Polonia Restituta (1999)
- Wiktor Audience Award (1999)
- Wiktor Award (1994)
- Order of the Smile (1993)
- Witkor Award (1993)

== Filmography ==
- Historia polskiego rocka (2008, documentary, directors: Leszek Gnoiński, Wojciech Słota)
