= Father Eugeniusz Dutkiewicz SAC Hospice =

Polish charitable organization

Coordinates: 54°21′47″N 18°38′08″E

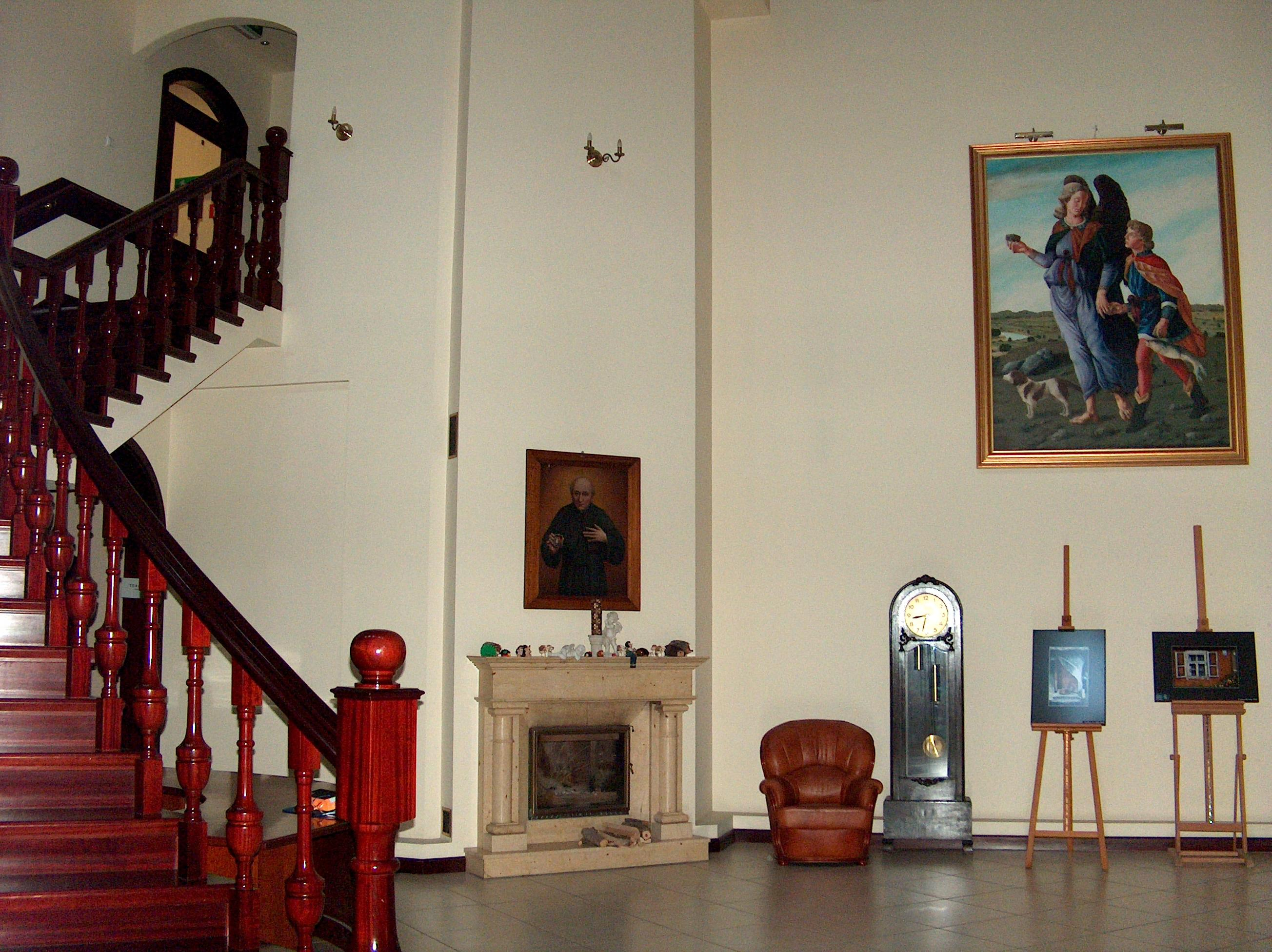
The main hall of the Hospice

Father Eugeniusz Dutkiewicz SAC Hospice (formerly: Pallottinum Hospice) in Gdańsk, a charitable organization, founded by the Pallottine priest E. Dutkiewicz in 1983, provides palliative care for the terminally ill patients.

== History ==
Father E. Dutkiewicz SAC Hospice (formerly: Pallottinum Hospice) was established in Gdańsk in 1983 on the initiative of the Catholic Church, local medical staff and groups of volunteers. The founding movement was led by the Pallottine priest Eugeniusz Dutkiewicz, one of the pioneers of the concept of hospice care in Poland. In 1987, the Polish Episcopate appointed Fr Dutkiewicz the National Chaplain of Hospices in Poland in recognition of his active service for the development of the hospice movement.

After the commencement of the Hospice in Gdańsk its range of charitable activities were dynamically expended.

In 1991, The Regional Center of Palliative and Hospice Care (Wojewódzki Ośrodek Opieki Paliatywnej i Hospicyjnej) was founded, which is in charge of palliative care in Gdańsk. The center also provides consultations in palliative medicine for the whole Pomeranian region. After Dutkiewicz's death in 2002, the Pallottine priest Piotr Krakowiak, PhD, became the new director of the Hospice and was appointed the National Chaplain of Hospices in Poland in the same year. In 2003, the hospice house was created, which offers help to the most needy patients. In June 2003, the hospice ward for terminally ill children, the first hospice ward for adolescent patients in Pomeranian region was established. In 2004, on the initiative of Fr Krakowiak, The Hospice Foundation (Fundacja Hospicyjna) was established. The foundation conducts charitable and educational activities throughout Poland, raising funds for more than a hundred of Polish hospices. In January 2004, the Hospice obtained a new statute and assumed a new name in honour of its founder – the present name of the Hospice is: Father Eugeniusz Dutkiewicz SAC Hospice (Hospicjum im. Ks. Eugeniusza Dutkiewicza SAC).

== Hospice Services ==
The Hospice offers two models of palliative care ― stationary hospice at a residence and home hospice, providing specialised care at a patient's home. Both approaches are meant not only for adults but also for children.

The first form of help is aimed at the terminally ill patients whose families are unable to deliver constant care. The hospice residence provides thirty beds in rooms with separate sanitary fittings. The patients are entitled to stay at the stationary hospice for a long time; however, it is also possible to admit a patient for a shorter period ― until 10 days.

The philosophy of the home hospice consists in the co-operation of an interdisciplinary health care team with a patient's family. This model of help comprises personnel's visits at a patient's place of residence and provides specialised medical equipment, medicines and dressings.

Irrespective of the model of the care delivered, the hospice offers twenty-four-hour access to help ― also on Saturdays and Sundays. The hospice conducts necessary laboratory tests with the use of specialised equipment. The palliative care team includes physicians, nurses, therapists, specialists carrying out rehabilitation, clergymen and charity workers. Apart from the standard services, the Pediatric Ward organises games for the youngest patients, with the help of the volunteers.

=== Additional services ===
A Palliative Care and Pain Therapy Outpatient Clinic has been established in the hospice house so as to deal with patients in the final stage of their disease. The clinic is intended to be visited by patients from Gdańsk and its environs who had completed casual treatment in hospital.

The hospital additionally hosts bereavement support group workshops.

== Voluntary Service ==
=== Medical Voluntary Service ===
The primary purpose of Gdańsk hospice is to focus on the palliation of patients in the terminal phase of their illness. The professional medical team, i.e. doctors and nurses, additionally aided by both clergymen and volunteers, strive to improve quality of life for people facing this difficult period of their existence. Medical volunteers provide services to the ailing and their families not only in the stationary residence, but in patients' private homes as well. Some main examples of volunteers' duties are: providing assistance with personal care such as bathing, doing light housekeeping for the patients and their families, and being a comforting and supportive presence.

=== Charity Campaigns ===
In addition to the medical voluntary service, Gdańsk Hospice is also the organiser of various campaigns, both local and national. The aim of those is to help the ill and dying, as well as to popularise the hospice idea in society.

One of such campaigns is the WHAT programme (full name: Hospice Voluntary Service as a Tool of Acceptance and Tolerance Learning Tool among Prisoners), whose pioneer is Father E. Dutkiewicz Hospice. In accordance with the programme's guiding principles, convicts and small offence criminals may join voluntary service. The programme was initiated in 2002, and since then has proved to be a success. The movie To Overcome Prejudice tells the story of this campaign.

'Fields of Hope' (Pola Nadziei) is an international campaign, first conducted in Scotland by the Marie Curie Cancer Care Foundation. In Poland, the first to organise this campaign was the Hospice in Kraków in 1998, and in 2003, Father Eugeniusz Dutkiewicz Hospice SAC in Gdańsk joined the action. Each year, around 4 October, thousands of people plant daffodils (at hospitals, schools, government buildings, etc.) as a symbol of solidarity with cancer patients. In spring, when the flowers are in bloom, begins the action aiming to gather funds for providing hospice care. The volunteers, dressed in yellow T-shirts, collect money for the hospice on streets, in parks, in front of churches and shopping malls. A daffodil flower – the symbol of hope – is given out in thanks for contributions. The fund-raising is accompanied by various artistic happenings (e.g. concerts). In addition to gaining monetary fundings for the hospices, Fields of Hope is also aimed at promoting the idea of hospice care, informing the society of its role and activity, as well as sensitising people to the needs of terminally ill patients.

The Package from the Heart campaign (Paczka od Serca) is organised each year in December, with the aim of helping the youngest patients. Within the campaign, an auction of special packages is held. The contents of said packages are composed by media, movie, music and sports celebrities.

The Become a Gdańsk Angel campaign (Zostań Gdańskim Aniołem) has taken place during the 749th Dominican Fair (Jarmark Św. Dominika). The volunteers, dressed as angels, took part in the opening parade, and organised an additional attraction for spectators and the ill from Gdańsk Hospice. The aim of this campaign was to help people realise the importance of helping others, and also to call attention to the suffering of another.
