= Polish Humanitarian Action =

- Logo of the Polish Humanitarian Action
- Formation: 26 December 1992
- Headquarters: Warsaw
- Location: Poland
- President: Janina Ochojska
- Website: pah.org.pl

The Polish Humanitarian Action (PAH, pl. Polska Akcja Humanitarna) is a Polish non-governmental organisation which operates in Poland and other countries.

Its mission is "to make the world a better place through alleviation of human suffering and promotion of humanitarian values".

Polish Humanitarian Action (PAH) helps people in crisis situations to become self-reliant and regain responsibility for their future as soon as possible. At the same time, PAH concentrates its efforts on Polish society, with a view to shape humanitarian attitudes and create a modern culture of aid. The guiding principle of PAH is to act efficiently in due respect of human dignity. PAH's principle, applied from the very moment of foundation, is to provide aid regardless of nationality, race, religion or party of conflict.

== Management Board of PAH ==
- Janina Ochojska-Okońska – president of Polish Humanitarian Action from its foundation
- Dorota Serafin
- Grzegorz Gruca
- Maciej Bagiński
- Katarzyna Górska

== History and characteristics of PAH's activity ==
Polish Humanitarian Action was established on 26 December 1992, initially as the EquiLibre Foundation, and from December 1994 under its present name. In 1992, Janina Ochojska started organizing convoys with donations for the inhabitants of Sarajevo. It was the first initiative of this kind, which provided an opportunity for Polish society to provide aid to people suffering as a result of war, which was taking place not far away from their own country. PAH’s activity served as a mobilizing factor for people from different social backgrounds. They were determined to help and to show their solidarity with people in need. Thanks to their commitment, PAH was able to organize a series of spontaneous aid actions which concentrated mainly on immediate aid, by sending convoys with donations to satisfy the basic needs - food, medicine, rehabilitation equipment and other necessities indispensable to survive in the situation of war or natural disaster.
