= Antoni Stawikowski =

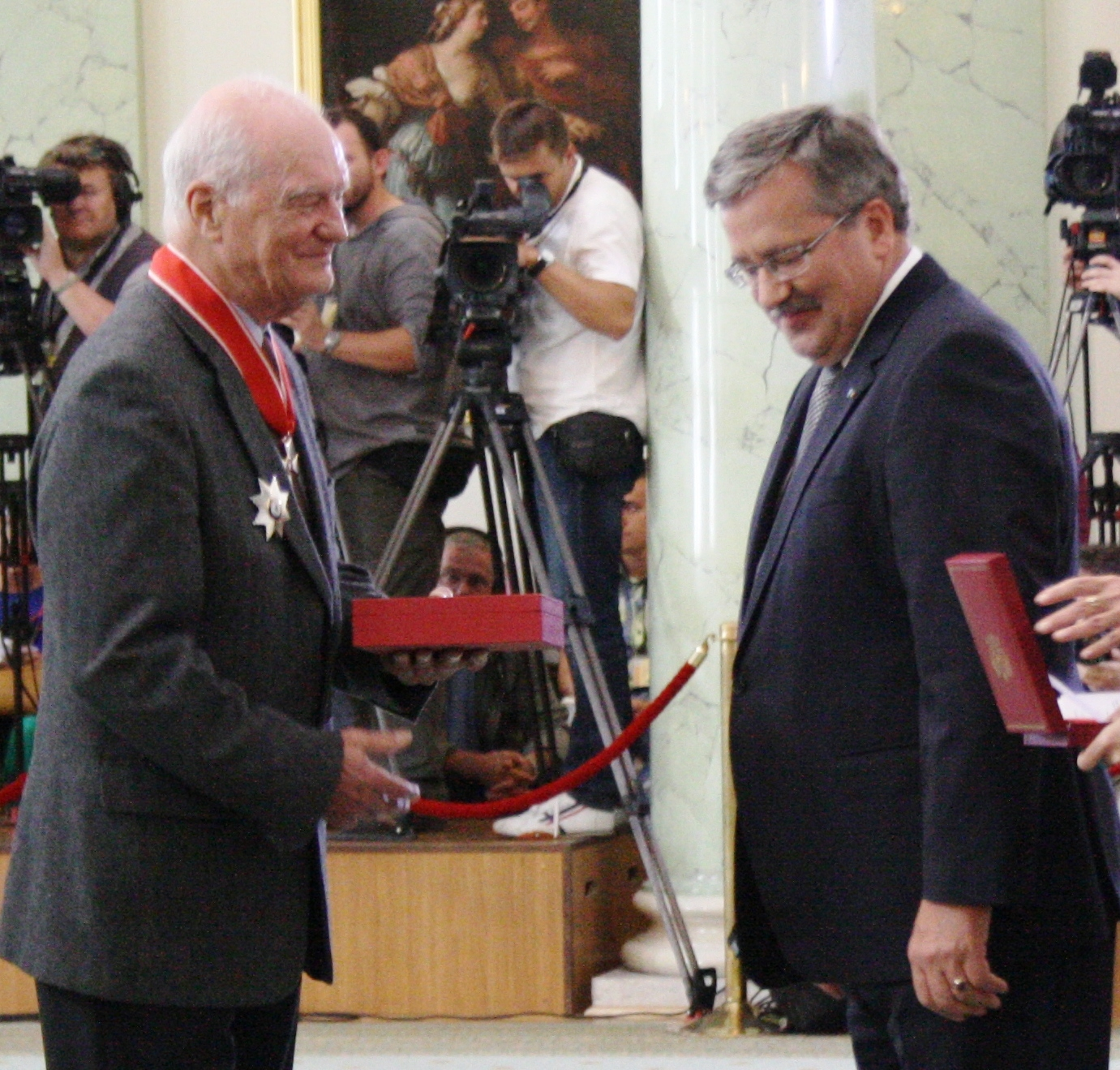
- Antoni Stawikowski
- Born: 1933 (age 92–93); Poland
- Occupations: Astronomer; Cosmologist; Trade unionist; Political activist
- Employer(s): Nicolaus Copernicus Astronomical Center, Polish Academy of Sciences
- Known for: First leader of the underground Solidarity union in Toruń
- Office: President of the Solidarity trade union in Toruń
- Children: Małgorzata; Anna
- Awards: Order of Polonia Restituta (Commander's Cross with Star)

Antoni Stawikowski (born 1933, Poland), first leader of the Polish illegal Solidarity union in Toruń.

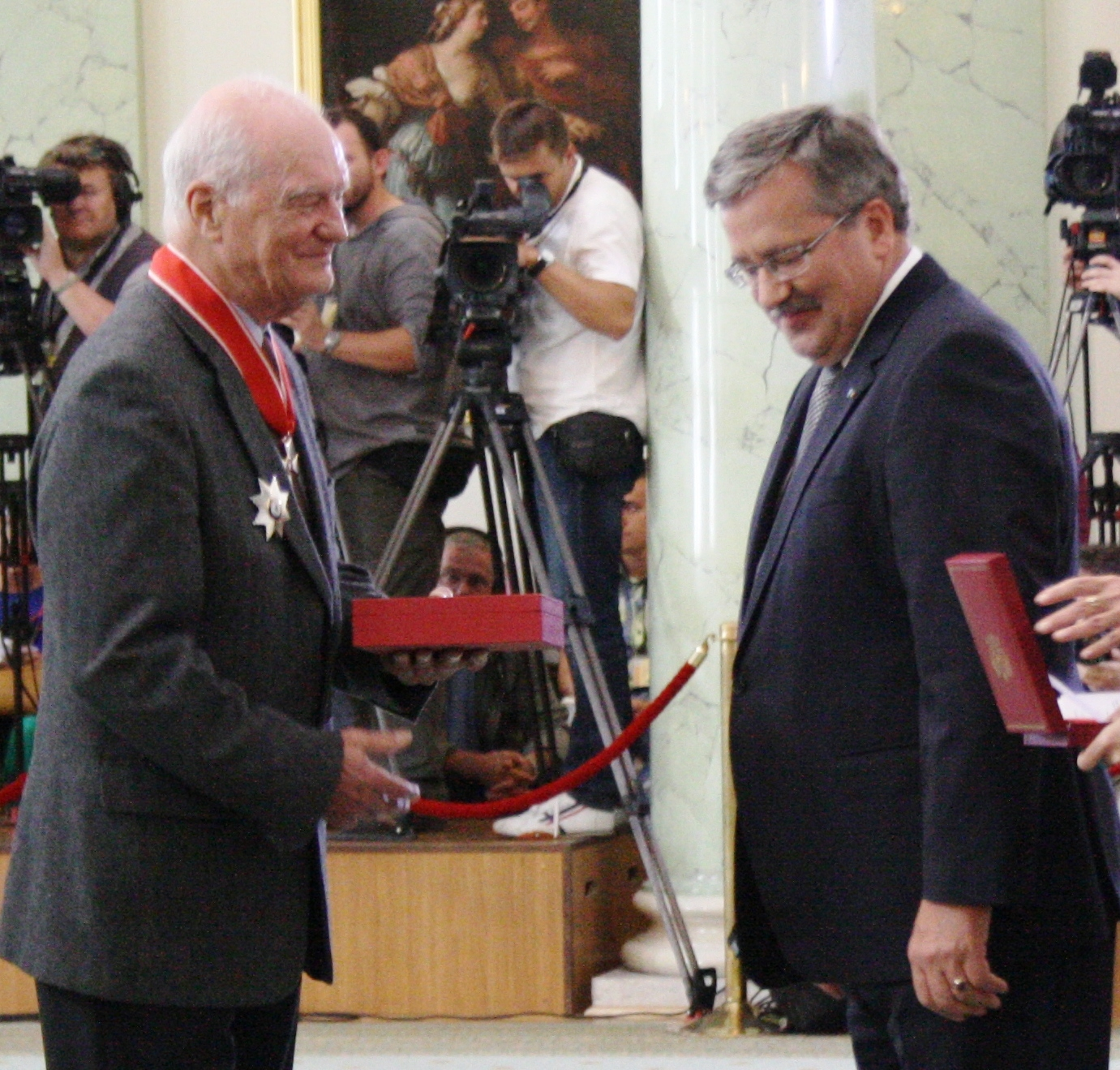
Antoni Stawikowski

== Career ==
Stawikowski was the president of the then-illegal Solidarity union in Toruń from 1981–89, when the union has been proclaimed legal. Together with Ryszard Musielak, Andrzej Tyc, Stanisław Dembiński, Jarosław Zaremba, and others, Stawikowski was one of the crucial activists fighting with the communists regime in the region of Toruń. During the martial law (1981-1983) held in prison.

In 1955, he was hired at the Nicolaus Copernicus Astronomical Center of the Polish Academy of Sciences in Toruń (CAMK Toruń). He earned his doctoral degree in 1976. He author of several books on astronomy and cosmology.

In 2013, Bronisław Komorowski (then President of Poland) awarded him with Order of Polonia Restituta.

== Family ==
He has two daughters, Małgorzata and Anna.

== See also ==
- Solidarity (Polish trade union)
- History of Poland
- Toruń
