= Great Orchestra of Christmas Charity =

Polish charity organisation

The Great Orchestra of Christmas Charity
- Founded: 2 March 1993; 33 years ago
- Founder: Jerzy Owsiak
- Legal status: Non-profit organization/charity organization
- Purpose: Raising funds for the healthcare system in Poland
- Headquarters: Warsaw, Poland
- Website: en.wosp.org.pl

The Great Orchestra of Christmas Charity (GOCC, Polish Wielka Orkiestra Świątecznej Pomocy, WOŚP) is the biggest, non-governmental, non-profit, charity organization in Poland raising money for pediatric and elderly care. The GOCC Foundation holds American Heart Association certification to provide courses in CPR and AED, and for the use of high technology for medical lifesaving. The GOCC aims to support health care in Poland by purchase of state of the art medical equipment for Polish hospitals and clinics and by establishing and running six medical programmes and one educational programme. The foundation supports pediatric and geriatric wards, furnishing them in both complex medical devices such as MRI scanners, and providing long-term care units with anti-bedsore mattresses and beds.

Since April 2016 the GOCC ranks on the top of the list as the most trusted public entity according to Brand Asset Valuator and is the second strongest brand in Poland in the ranking compiled by Millward Brown and Young & Rubicam agency. The GOCC foundation organizes the biggest open-air free entry music festival in Europe – Pol'and'Rock Festival. The GOCC foundation offers first aid and team building courses, which are open to all adult members of public. The volunteers who have completed the training become the members of Peace Patrol, whose duties involve stewarding at the festival field, assisting and informing festival goers.

According to a survey by the newspaper Gazeta Wyborcza, it is the most-trusted Polish organization.

English variant logo

== History ==
The name The Great Orchestra of Christmas Charity was coined by Jerzy Owsiak in 1993. The charity was officially founded in 1993 by Jerzy Owsiak, Lidia Niedźwiedzka-Owsiak, Bohdan Maruszewski, and Piotr Burczyński. The main objective, at that time, was "Protecting Health and Saving Children's Lives by Providing Medical Equipment to Public Hospitals" (as stated in the deed of foundation). During the first Finale (which was organized for the benefit of paediatric cardiac-surgery) in the same year, the Foundation collected a total of USD 1,535,440.68. Subsequently, what was intended to be one-time fundraiser to aid Children's Memorial Health Institute in Warsaw became an annual public fundraiser held across the country. In 2004 the GOCC raised money for the victims of tsunami in Sri Lanka. In 2010, after southern Poland has been struck by flooding a special fundraiser was held in aid of flood relief.

Every year, millions of Poles donate to the Foundation and throughout 24 Grand Finales, the Foundation collected over $130 million for cardiac-surgery, neonatology, paediatric oncology, kidney diseases, congenital disorders, newborns and children under 5 years of age who have been victims of accidents . Since 2013 the GOCC has been raising funds to support geriatric and long-term care units in Poland.

During the 27th Grand Finale concert in Gdańsk on 13 January 2019, Mayor of Gdańsk Paweł Adamowicz was stabbed on stage. He died the following day after undergoing over five hours of surgery in a hospital. After Adamowicz's death, Jerzy Owsiak announced that he would be stepping down as the chairman of the GOCC.

A wave of support came from millions of people with the hashtag #MuremZaOwsiakiem trending (translated as #WeStandWithOwsiak) and hundreds of thousands of people signing a petition for Owsiak to remain the chairman of GOCC. Many pleas from celebrities, social activists, men of science, artists and religious activists were sent to Owsiak, begging that he stay the chairman of GOCC. After the funeral of Paweł Adamowicz, Jerzy posted a video on his Facebook page saying that he was overwhelmed by the support and that he would not step down as the chairman of GOCC. He made a promise to Paweł Adamowicz that the Great Orchestra of Christmas Charity would be playing for eternity and one day longer.

== The Grand Finale ==
Since the 7th Grand Finale in 1999, the Grand Finale fundraiser has continuously taken place on the second Sunday of January, with the exception of the 9th, 25th, 29th and 30th Grand Finale in 2001, 2017, 2021 and 2022 respectively. The 29th Grand Finale in 2021 was post-poned by three weeks due to COVID-19. The day-long public fundraiser is held in Poland and everywhere where there is an active Polish community. The public fundraiser is organised locally, by volunteer-run Collection Centres, and is accompanied by various events such as concerts, sporting competitions, and firework displays. A telethon, broadcast nationally, is held on the day as well. Volunteers, carrying branded collection boxes collect money across the country, and people donating money receive distinct red-heart stickers in return. The day culminates with a firework display - known as Light to the Sky, which takes place in front of the Palace of Culture and Science in Warsaw. The funds are being raised during a public money collection, in online auctions, and personal and corporate donations.

Each Grand Finale has a specific medical objective, which is implemented by the foundation after consultations with medical professionals. In order to receive aid from the foundation, the hospitals apply for devices that achieve the stated objective. The equipment is bought by the foundation during an open tender.

Finale	Date	Fundraiser Aim	Funds raised			
Finale	Date	Fundraiser Aim	(in USD)	(in 2025 USD)		
I	January 3, 1993	Children's cardio-surgery	1,535,440.68	3,422,112.09		
II	January 2, 1994	Neonatology	1,930,726.93	4,193,934.23		
III	January 8, 1995	Pediatric oncology	2,816,465.36	5,950,928.67		
IV	January 7, 1996	Rescue of accident victims	2,543,413.59	5,221,202.31		
V	January 5, 1997	Children's cardio-surgery	3,062,067.29	6,141,273.02		
VI	January 4, 1998	Rescue of accident victims	3,543,276.74	6,999,020.51		
VII	January 10, 1999	Neonatology	4,515,020.82	8,726,093.97		
VIII	January 9, 2000	Children's kidney diseases	6,089,390.91	11,384,513.44		
IX	January 7, 2001	Newborns and children under 5 y/o	6,112,642.74	11,114,418.06		
X	January 13, 2002	Congenital defects	6,848,998.85	12,259,771.3		
XI	January 12, 2003	Newborns and children under 5 y/o	7,695,614.16	13,468,716.9		
XII	January 11, 2004	Newborns and children under 5 y/o	6,923,443.22	11,801,323.67		
XIII	January 9, 2005	Progressive methods of diagnostics and treatment in neonatology and pediatrics	9,864,292.87	16,261,208.64		
XIV	January 8, 2006	Saving lives of children injured in accidents / teaching CPR and first aid	9,660,691.63	15,428,720.95		
XV	January 14, 2007	Saving lives of children injured in accidents / CPR education	10,276,156.07	15,955,995.82		
XVI	January 13, 2008	Children with otolaryngological conditions	13,883,627.13	20,761,065.3		
XVII	January 11, 2009	Prevention and early diagnosis of cancer in children	13,404,441.27	20,116,018.19		
XVIII	January 10, 2010	Prevention and early diagnosis of cancer in children	14,413,466.03	21,280,372.93		
n/a	July 4, 2010	Special Finale: "Prevent Flooding!"	805,662.73	1,189,498.99		
XIX	January 9, 2011	Urological and kidney diseases	16,499,157.81	23,613,809.44		
XX	January 8, 2012	The purchase of life-saving equipment for preemies and insulin pumps	16,219,987.60	22,746,540.08		
XXI	January 13, 2013	Saving the lives of children and providing adequate healthcare for the elderly	16,432,382.15	22,711,899.61		
XXII	January 12, 2014	Saving the lives of children and providing adequate healthcare for the elderly	17,224,553.53	23,425,295.95		
XXIII	January 11, 2015	Treatment of children in paediatric and oncology wards and dignified medical treatment of the elderly	14,011,311.90	19,031,228.78		
XXIV	January 10, 2016	Treatment of children in paediatric and oncology wards and dignified medical treatment of the elderly	18,397,947.76	24,681,107.12		
XXV	January 15, 2017	Saving children's life and health in general wards and providing decent medical care to seniors	25,919,212.58	34,044,037.7		
XXVI	January 14, 2018	Improvement of health care for newborns	37,157,837.21	47,641,409.36		
XXVII	January 13, 2019	Newest equipment for children hospitals	46,969,597.29	59,147,579.56		
XXVII	January 19, 2019	Special raise for the Fr. Eugeniusz Dutkiewicz SAC Hospice during mayor Adamowicz's funeral				
XXVII	January 23, 2019	Special raise after the mayor of Gdańsk was killed on stage during 27th Grand Finale†	4,239,303.42	5,338,443.39		
XXVIII	January 12, 2020	For clinical care of children	48,852,683.82	60,775,326.73		
XXIX	January 31, 2021	Laryngology, otolaryngology and head diagnostics	56,518,453.11	67,151,668.16		
XXX	January 30, 2022	Pediatric ophthalmology	51,850,158.04	57,044,607.58		
XXXI	January 29, 2023	Medical equipment for early diagnosis of the bacterial infection that causes sepsis	56,658,915.37	-		
XXXII	January 28, 2024	"Lungs after pandemic"	70,653,572.87	-		
XXXIII	January 26, 2025	Children's oncology and hematology	71, 889, 592	-	TOTAL:	623,529,913.48 USD; 806,341,630.69 in 2025 USD^{A}

^A For years after 2025 nominal values are used.

== Medical programmes ==
The GOCC Foundation runs four medical programs and one educational programme. The programmes are in action all-year long and are introduced to hospitals and clinics nationwide, because the foundation aims to systematically improve public healthcare in Poland.

- National Early Cancer Diagnostics in Children Programme - establishing a nationwide network of diagnostics centres aiming to detect cancer in children at an early stage. Another aim of the programme is to equip Poland’s key paediatric oncology wards with state of the art devices. The programme also includes awareness campaigns aimed at both doctors and parents.
- Universal Infant Hearing Screening Programme – free hearing tests of newborns in neonatology wards. The program is implemented in all wards across the country and allows to diagnose if a newborn child has any hearing defects and needs extensive tests to subsequent hearing aids.
- The Retinopathy of Prematurity Prevention and Treatment Program – diagnosis and treatment of children whose retina has been damaged due to premature birth.
- Non-Invasive Breathing Support in Neonates Programme - “Infant Flow” – The program’s goal is to lower the number cases in which mechanical ventilation of premature babies and newborns is needed, because mechanical ventilation often leads to severe pulmonary complications.
- Programme for Personal Insulin Pump Treatment of Pregnant Diabetic Women - The program is aimed at purchasing insulin pumps which give pregnant women the chance for an active and an easier life with diabetes.
- National Program for Personal Insulin Pump Treatment of Diabetic Children - within the scope of this program purchases insulin pumps which give children a chance for an easier and more active life despite diabetes.

== Educational programme ==
The GOCC runs an educational programme known as 'We Save and Teach How to Save Lives' aimed at teaching children in primary schools the basis of CPR and first aid. Primary schools, which participate in the programme receive free teaching aids and the designated teachers are trained by certified AHA instructors.
