= Children's Memorial Health Institute =

Coordinates: 52°12′23″N 21°11′30″E

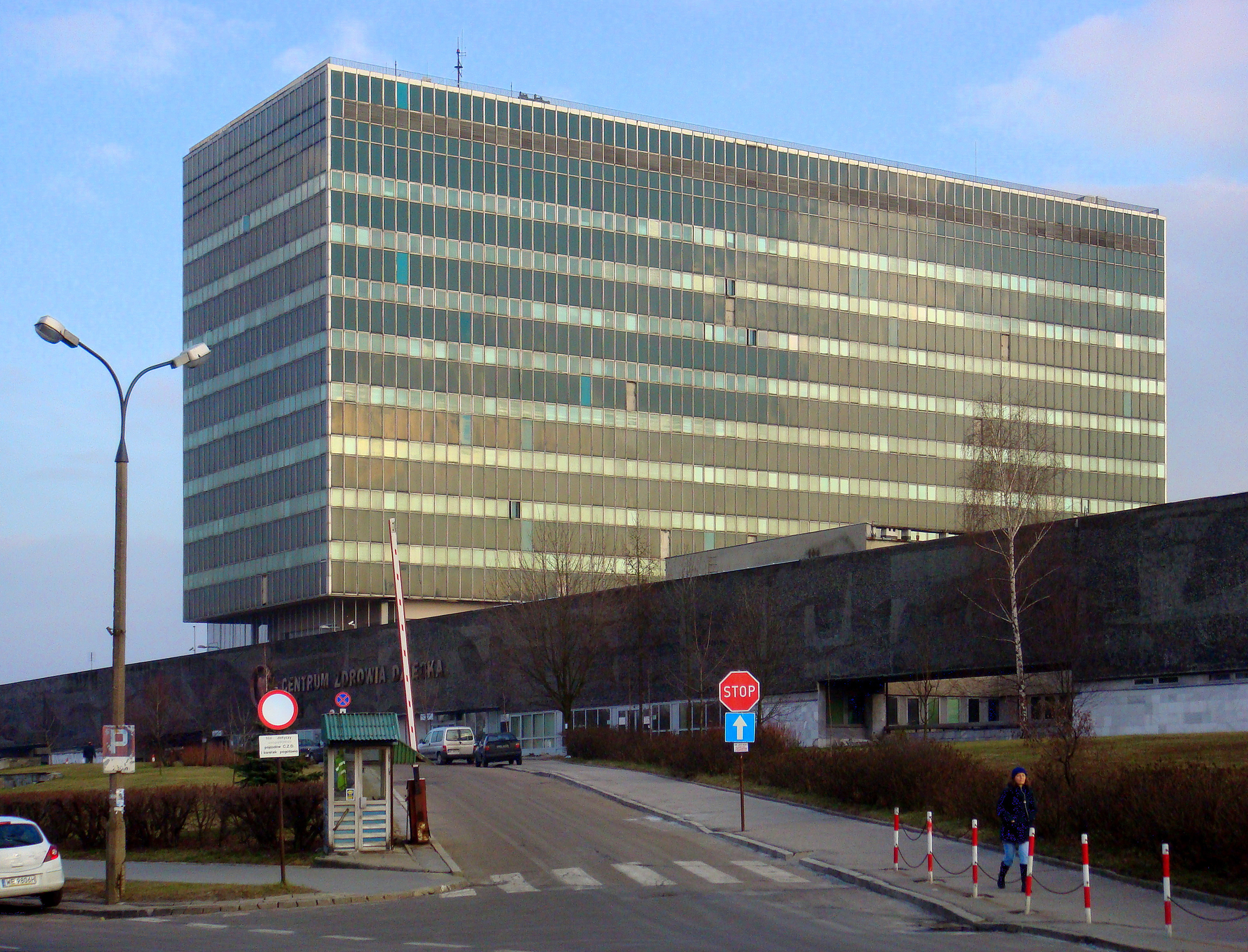
- The main building of the hospital complex

Geography
- Location: Warsaw, Poland

Organisation
- Affiliated university: None
- Patron: None

Services
- Emergency department: Yes
- Beds: 550

Helipads
- Helipad: Yes

History
- Founded: 15-10-1977

Links
- Website: http://www.czd.pl
- Lists: Hospitals in Poland

The Children's Memorial Health Institute (Polish: Instytut "Pomnik - Centrum Zdrowia Dziecka", literally "Children's Health Memorial Centre Institute"; CMHI or CZD) is the largest and best-equipped institute of paediatric healthcare in Poland. Located in Warsaw and directly subordinate to Poland's Ministry of Healthcare, it is also one of leading teaching hospitals in Poland.

The centre employs roughly 2,000 physicians and staff, and includes 17 wards and 29 disease-specific out-patients clinics. It collaborates with Poland's leading medical schools as well as non-governmental organizations, such as the Great Orchestra of Christmas Charity. As many of the children treated there require long-term therapy, the centre also includes a pre-school, a primary school, gymnasium and an academic high school.

== History ==
On 20 June 1965 Ewa Szelburg-Zarembina, a noted writer and Holocaust survivor, published a lengthy article in Warsaw's Życie Warszawy daily, in which she suggested that the World War II martyrdom and heroism of children should be commemorated with a construction of a memorial.

Let those children who suffered and died only because they were children of this land, those children who suffered and died because they defended the freedom and honour of the Polish nation and state, and the most important treasure of humanity, peace and justice, let them receive from us, the living, a sign of undying memory. Let our witness to their heroism and suffering be more than just a small part of what the nation venerates. They deserve an enduring, separate and exclusive expression of our memory.

Soon her appeal was endorsed by both medical, social and WWII veteran societies, including the Polish Paediatric Society, Polish Scouting and Guiding Association and the Society of Fighters for Freedom and Democracy. The deputy chairman of the latter organisation, Seweryna Szmaglewska, herself also a noted writer, proposed that instead of building a typical monument, a memorial hospital could be built instead, commemorating " the heroic deaths and martyrdom of children throughout Poland’s history". The idea was widely accepted. By February 1968 a location was chosen in Warsaw's suburb of Międzylesie (since then incorporated into the city of Warsaw itself), back then a relatively remote location in the forests to the south-east of the capital of Poland, known for its healthy climate. The idea was to build a modern hospital where children would receive comprehensive care going beyond medical treatment, a novel idea in contemporary Polish medical care. The hospital was initially named "Pomnik-Szpital Centrum Zdrowia Dziecka", or "Monument-Hospital Centre for Child's Health".

A "Civic Committee for the Construction of the Children's Memorial Health Centre" was established to oversee the fund-raising programme among both ordinary Poles and the Polish diaspora abroad. Similar foundations were soon started in many countries throughout the world to support the effort. Apart from money, many groups donated also pieces of art and jewellery to help raise the needed funds, as well as machinery to be installed in the future centre. On 8 June 1970 a project of the new hospital was chosen from among dozens of submitted designs. The winning plans were designed by a team led by Jacek Bolechowski, Andrzej Bołtuć and Andrzej Zieliński. As a socially-funded enterprise, the hospital started its operations even before the ground was broken: on 11 March 1972 a group of veteran child soldiers started the centre's blood bank, one of the first such institutions in Poland. One of the founders of the blood bank, Col. Kazimierz Przedpełski (15 years old at the time he took part in the Warsaw Uprising as a runner) remarked, that "During World War II so much blood was spilled, including blood of children and youth. These days, we thought, there is no need to spill the blood on the battlefield, but this blood is still needed - for preservation of life and health of others". Soon afterwards the construction started.

=== Activity ===
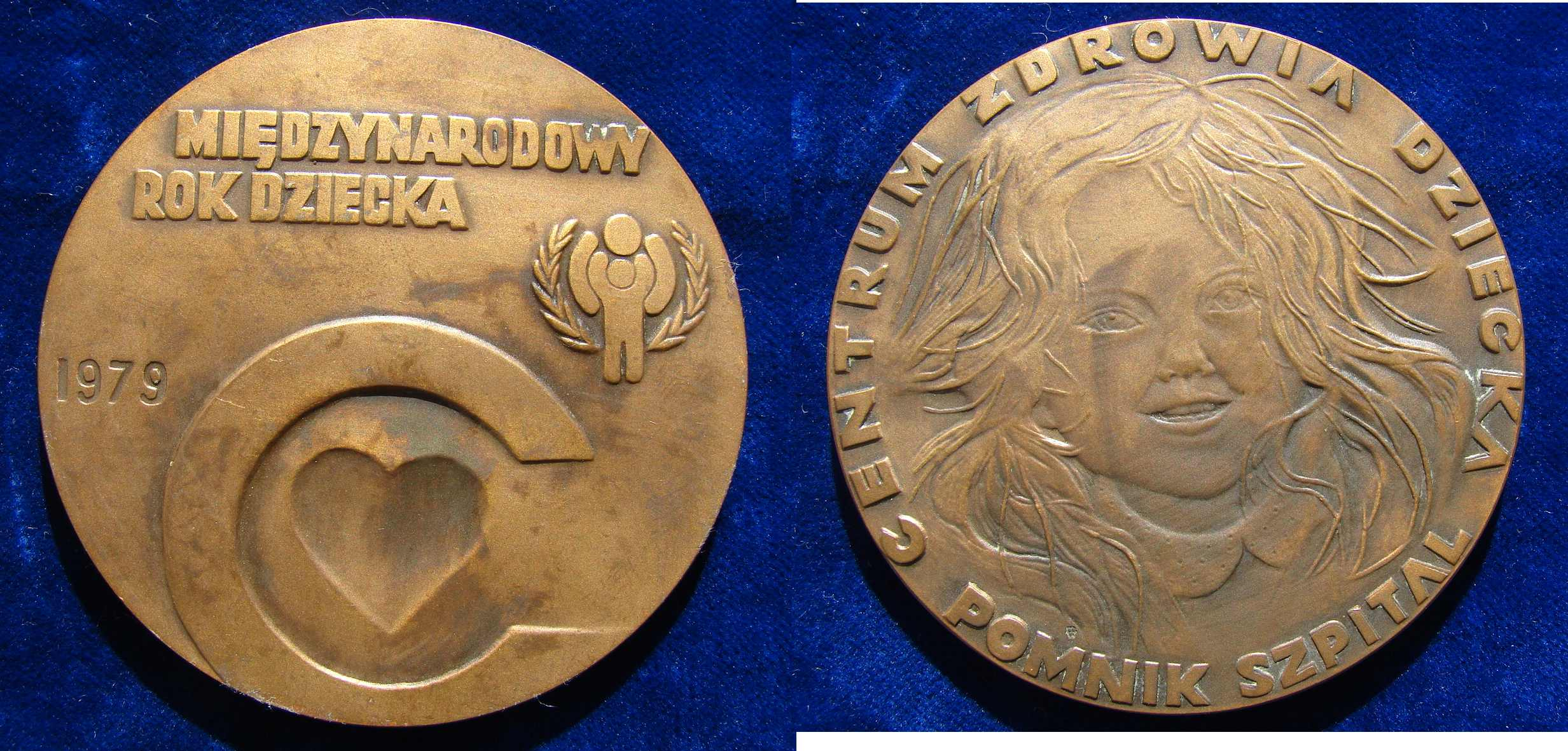
Poland, 1979 Medal International Year of the Child

The first stage (three large pavilions: A, B and C) was completed on 31 May, for the International Children's Day of 1 June 1977. On 17 October of that year the first patients were admitted. In five years, between 1977 and 1980 the Centre admitted 144,808 under-age patients. The entire complex, including the 13-storey hospital wing, the operating theatre, the training centre and administrative complex was ready by the end of 1979. Additional amenities were built in the third stage, completed in 1991.

Since 19 December 1995 the Centre functions as a research institute directly subordinate to the Ministry of Healthcare, and as such is one of leading research and development medical centres in Poland.
