= Lidia Korsakówna =

Polish actress (1934–2013)

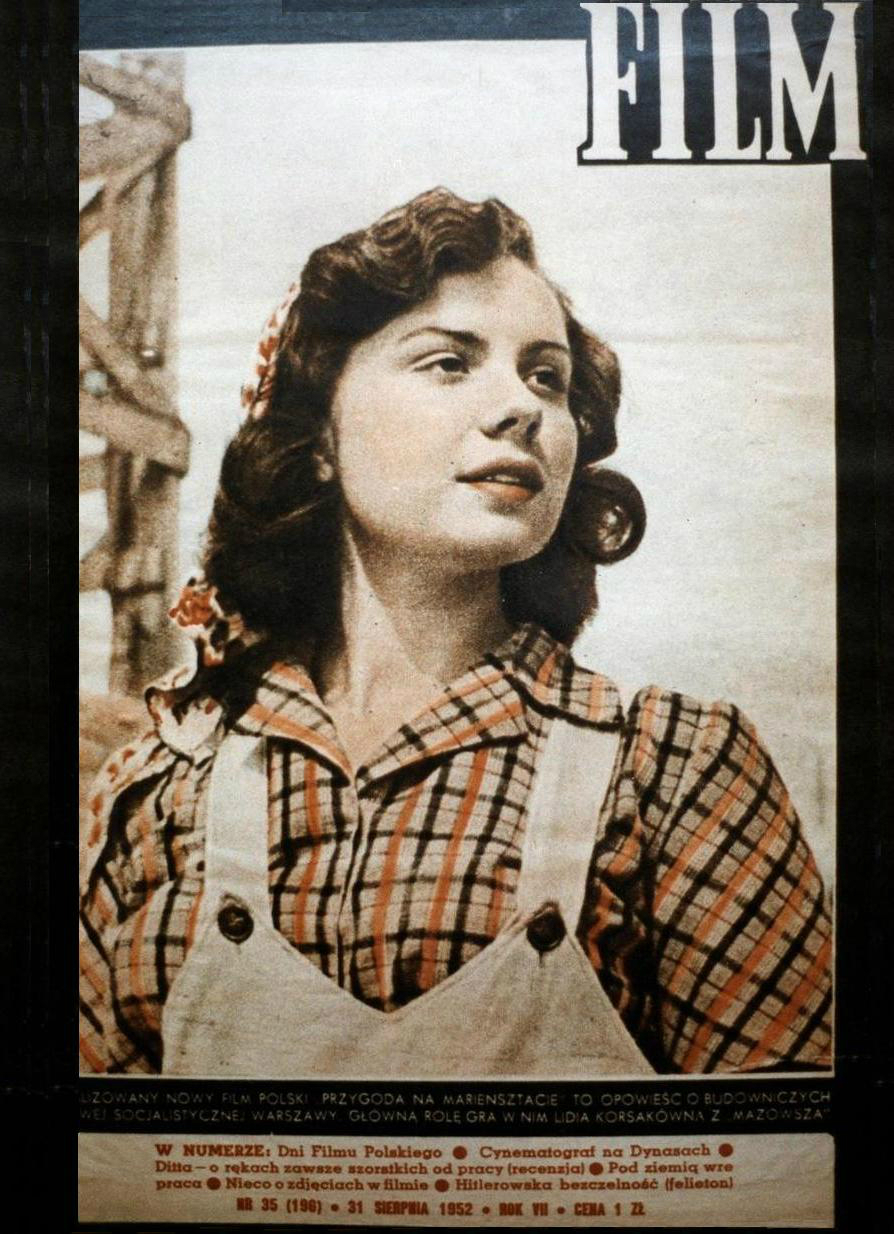
- Lidia Korsakówna on the cover of the Polish Film magazine (1952)
- Born: 17 January 1934; Baranowicze, Poland
- Died: 6 August 2013 (aged 79); Konstancin-Jeziorna, Poland
- Resting place: Powązki Cemetery
- Occupation: Actress
- Years active: 1950–2010
- Spouse: Kazimierz Brusikiewicz (m. 1963; died 1989)

Lidia Korsakówna (born 17 January 1934, Baranowicze, Poland – died 6 August 2013, Konstancin-Jeziorna) was a Polish theater and film actress. Born in Baranowicze, Poland (present-day Belarus), Korsakówna died in Konstancin-Jeziorna at the age of 79.

== Honors and awards ==
- Cross of Merit (1970)
- Order of Polonia Restituta (1979)
- Zasłużony Działacz Kultury (1984)
- Medal of the 40th Anniversary of People's Poland (1985)
- Medal for Merit to Culture – Gloria Artis (2011)
