= Mam talent! series 6 =

Mam talent!
- Series 6
- Hosted by: Marcin Prokop; Szymon Hołownia
- Judges: Małgorzata Foremniak; Agustin Egurrola; Agnieszka Chylińska
- Winner: Tetiana Galitsyna
- Runner-up: Tekla Klebetnica

Release
- Original network: TVN
- Original release: 7 September – 30 November 2013

Series chronology
- ← Previous; Series 5 Next → Series 7

The sixth series of Mam talent! began airing on TVN on 7 September 2013 and ended on 30 November 2013. Marcin Prokop and Szymon Hołownia returned to present the show. Agnieszka Chylińska and Małgorzata Foremniak returned as judges and were joined by Agustin Egurrola. The series was won by Ukrainian sand artist Tetiana Galitsyna, who received PLN 300,000. The runner-up, folk music band Tekla Klebetnica received the second prize, a car funded by sponsor of the series. Dancer Santiago Gil came third.

== Judges and presenters ==
Series 6 judges

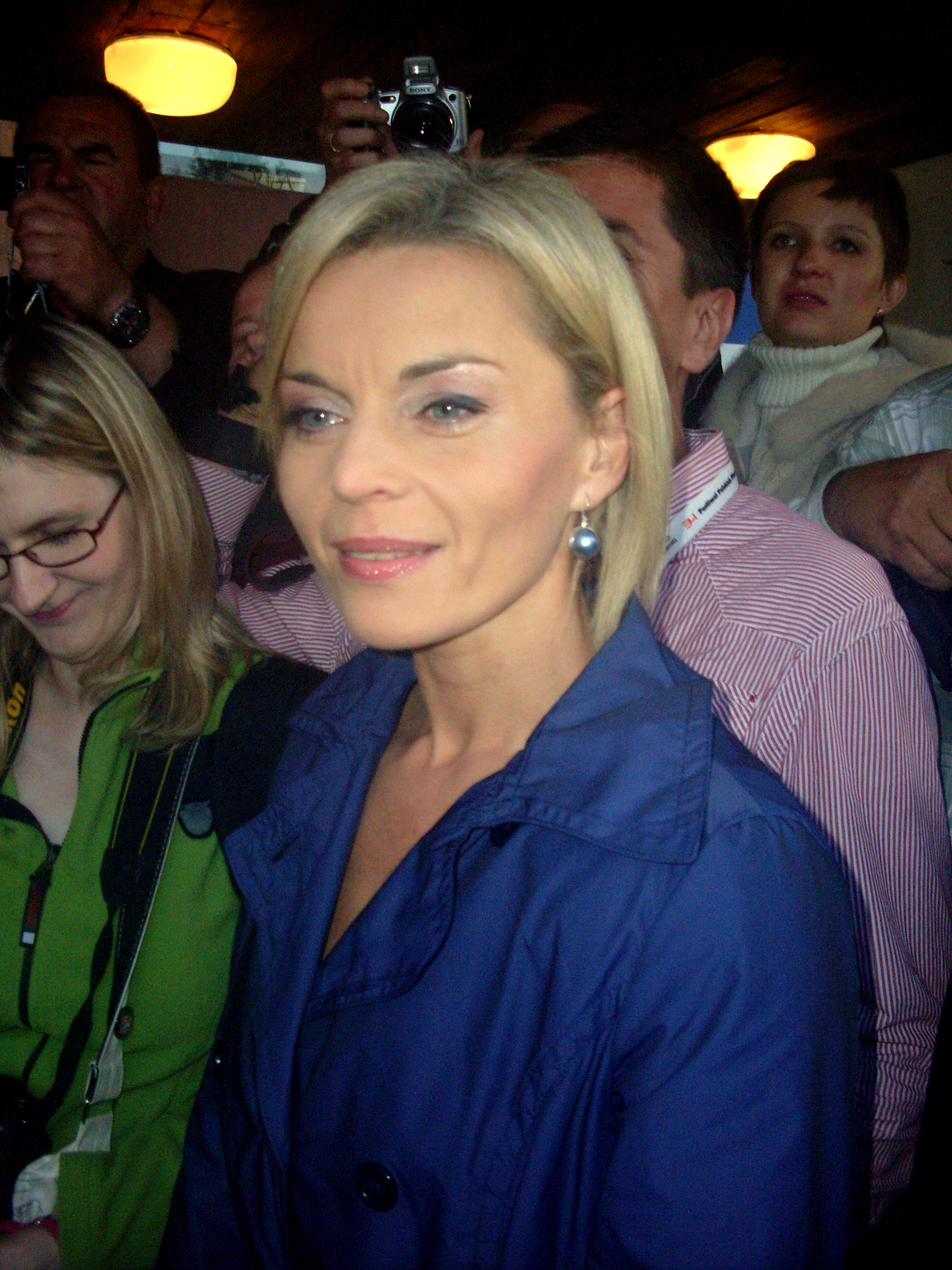
Małgorzata Foremniak

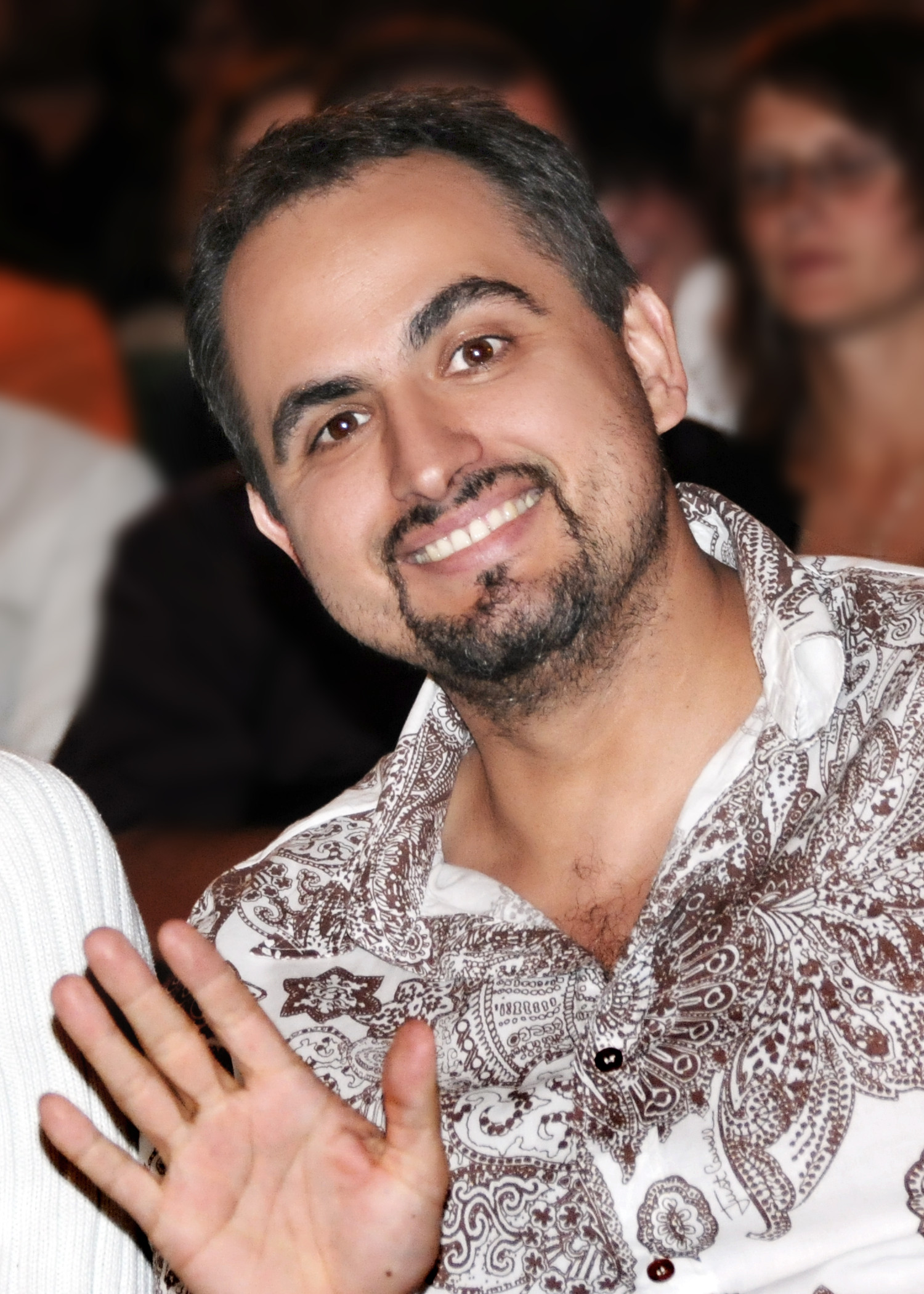
Agustin Egurrola

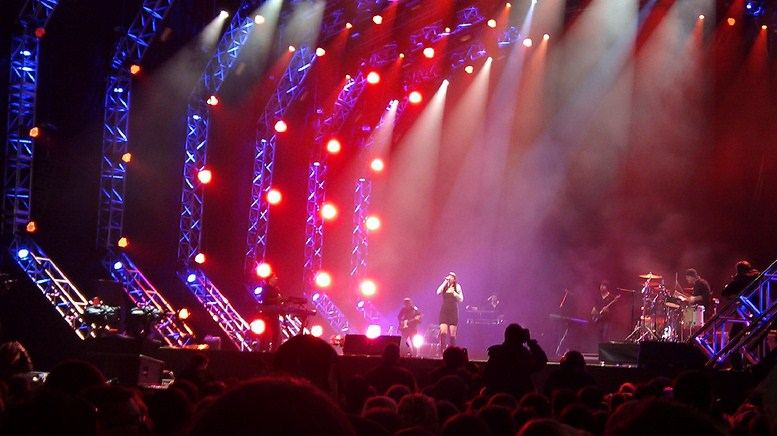
Agnieszka Chylińska

On 26 May 2013 Agnieszka Chylińska confirmed her return for the sixth series alongside Małgorzata Foremniak. On 4 June 2013 Wirtualne Media reported that Robert Kozyra would leave the panel due to failure of negotiations with TVN regarding his salary. Individuals rumoured to be replacing Kozyra included Hubert Urbański, Piotr Kędzierski, Marcin Prokop and YouTube personality Łukasz Jakóbiak. On 7 June 2013 Agustin Egurrola was announced as the new judge.

Presenting duo Marcin Prokop and Szymon Hołownia returned for their sixth year on the show.

== Auditions ==
=== Open auditions ===
Open auditions were taking place in eight polish cities throughout April 2013. The final open audition was held on 8 June 2013 in Warsaw.

Date	City	Venue
6 April 2013	Zabrze	House of Music and Dance
7 April 2013	Wrocław	Hotel Mercure Wrocław City Center
13 April 2013	Gdańsk	Hotel Mercure Gdańsk Old City
14 April 2013	Bydgoszcz	City Community Centre
20 April 2013	Rzeszów	Maska Theatre
21 April 2013	Lublin	Hotel Mercury Lublin City Center
27 April 2013	Szczecin	Community Centre Słowianin
28 April 2013	Poznań	Hotel Andersia
8 June 2013	Warsaw	Primate's Palace

=== Judges' auditions ===
Cities where live theatre auditions were held.

Filmed judge's auditions with live audience began on 16 June in Katowice and ended on 18 July 2013 in Warsaw. They were held in theatres in five Polish cities.

Date	City	Venue
16–17 June 2013	Katowice	Silesian Theatre
25–26 June 2013	Wrocław	Wrocław Opera
1–2 July 2013	Gdańsk	Wybrzeże Theatre
8–9 July 2013	Kraków	Juliusz Słowacki Theatre
17–18 July 2013	Warsaw	Dramatic Theatre

== Semi-finals ==
=== Semi-finals summary ===
Key	Buzzed out	Judges' vote	Won the public vote	Won the judges' vote	Lost the judges' vote

==== Semi-final 1 (26 October) ====
- Guest performer: Delfina & Bartek

Artist	Order	Act	Buzzes and judges' votes			Finished	Result
Artist	Order	Act	Chylińska	Egurrola	Foremniak	Finished	Result
Temptation	1	Dance troupe				Unknown	Eliminated
Marek Piowczyk Trio	2	Musical band				Unknown	Eliminated
Paula Pilarska	3	Dancer				Unknown	Eliminated
Tomasz Kabis	4	Illusionist				Unknown	Top 3 (Won judges' vote)
Fireflies	5	Shadow theatre group				1st	Top 3 (Won public vote)
Sztewite Sound	6	Beatbox group				Unknown	Eliminated
Roksana Kostyra	7	Acrobat				Unknown	Eliminated
Kuba Anusiewicz	8	Singer				Unknown	Top 3 (Lost judges' vote)

==== Semi-final 2 (2 November) ====
- Guest performer: Marcin Muszyński

Artist	Order	Act	Buzzes and judges' votes			Finished	Result
Artist	Order	Act	Chylińska	Egurrola	Foremniak	Finished	Result
Rycerska Kadra Polski	1	Knight act				Unknown	Eliminated
The Toobes	2	Musical band				Unknown	Eliminated
Marcel Ołubek	3	Yo-yo performer				1st	Top 3 (Won public vote)
Wojtek Schmach	4	Singer				Unknown	Eliminated
Diana Staniszewska	5	Dancer				Unknown	Top 3 (Won judges' vote)
Artyści Mimello	6	Mime act				Unknown	Eliminated
Diana John	7	Singer				Unknown	Top 3 (Lost judges' vote)
Inka and Karolina	8	Acrobats				Unknown	Eliminated

==== Semi-final 3 (9 November) ====
- Guest performer: Marcin Wyrostek

Artist	Order	Act	Buzzes and judges' votes			Finished	Result
Artist	Order	Act	Chylińska	Egurrola	Foremniak	Finished	Result
Gospel Joy	1	Choir				Unknown	Eliminated
Anna Sobera	2	Acrobat				Unknown	Top 3 (Lost judges' vote)
Piotr "Elton" Waśkowski	3	Singer				Unknown	Eliminated
Dominik Chmurski	4	Violinist				Unknown	Eliminated
Boso	5	Vocal group				Unknown	Eliminated
Marek Born	6	Footlball skills act				Unknown	Top 3 (Won judges' vote)
Santiago Gil	7	Dancer				1st	Top 3 (Won public vote)
Krystian Minda	8	Danger act				Unknown	Eliminated

==== Semi-final 4 (16 November) ====
Artist	Order	Act	Buzzes and judges' votes			Finished	Result
Artist	Order	Act	Chylińska	Egurrola	Foremniak	Finished	Result
Mulemba	1	Dance troupe				Unknown	Eliminated
Tekla Klebetnica	2	Folk music group				Unknown	Top 3 (Won judges' vote)
Patman Crew	3	Dance troupe				Unknown	Top 3 (Lost judges' vote)
Paweł Piekarski	4	Singer and guitarist				Unknown	Eliminated
Kabaret Świerszczychrząszcz	5	Cabaret				Unknown	Eliminated
Diana Ciecierska	6	Singer				Unknown	Eliminated
Magda and Wojtek	7	Dancers / Acrobats				Unknown	Eliminated
Tetiana Galitsyna	8	Sand artist				1st	Top 3 (Won public vote)

==== Semi-final 5 (23 November) ====
- Guest performer: Anna Filipowska

Artist	Order	Act	Buzzes and judges' votes			Finished	Result
Artist	Order	Act	Chylińska	Egurrola	Foremniak	Finished	Result
Sihir Stars	1	Dance troupe				Unknown	Eliminated
Kamil Kobędzowski^{1}	2	Bicycle stunt act				Unknown	Eliminated
Agnieszka Marczak	3	Acrobat				Unknown	Top 3 (Won judges' vote)
Steamlove	4	Singer				Unknown	Eliminated
NRS	5	Musical group				Unknown	Eliminated
M&Ms	6	Dancing duo				Unknown	Eliminated
Kinga Zdybel	7	Singer				1st	Top 3 (Won public vote)
Volodymir Omelchenko	8	Circus skills act				Unknown	Top 3 (Lost judges' vote)

- ^1 Originally, Michał Koziołek was among forty semi-finalists and was to perform in the last semi-final, but due to injury during rehearsals he had to withdraw from the competition and was replaced by Kamil Kobędzowski, who performs similar act.

== Final (30 November) ==
The live final took place on 30 November 2013. Sand artist Tetiana Galitsyna was crowned the winner with folk music band Tekla Klebetnica coming second and dancer Santiago Gil third.

Artist	Order	Act	Finished
Tekla Klebetnica	1	Folk music group	2nd
Tomasz Kabis	2	Illusionist	5th
Agnieszka Marczak	3	Acrobat	10th
Marek Born	4	Football skills act	8th
Fireflies	5	Shadow theatre group	4th
Marcel Ołubek	6	Yo-yo performer	6th
Santiago Gil	7	Dancer	3rd
Diana Staniszewska	8	Dancer	7th
Kinga Zdybel	9	Singer	9th
Tetiana Galitsyna	10	Sand artist	1st

== Contestants' appearances on earlier talent shows ==
- Diana John and Piotr Elton Waśkowski made it to the Judges' House on X Factor season three.
- Diana Sasha Staniszewska reached the semi-final (4th place) on "You Can Dance: Po prostu tańcz! season one. Next, Diana was a contestant on the first season of Mam talent! She was eliminated on the auditions. Later, she was a finalist (with her group Top Toys) on season one of Got to Dance. Tylko Taniec.
- The Toobes reached the semi-final on the fourth season on Must be the Music. Tylko Muzyka.
- Julia Szwajcer (from Boso band) and Paweł Piekarski make it to the Bootcamp stage on X Factor season three.
- Temptation reached the final (3rd place) on the second season on Got to Dance. Tylko Taniec.

== Ratings ==
Summary of episode ratings
Episode	Date	Duration (minutes)^1	Official rating (millions)	Weekly rank	Share (%)	Share 16-49 (%)	Source(s)
Auditions 1	7 September	100	3.10	12	23.5	27.8	
Auditions 2	14 September	100	3.54	8	24.6	29.4	
Auditions 3	21 September	100	3.23	11	21.6	23.5	
Auditions 4	28 September	100	3.56	8	24.4	28.5	
Auditions 5	5 October	100	3.31	11	22.2	25.9	
Auditions 6	12 October	100	3.62	9	24.7	27.3	
Auditions 7	19 October	100	2.93	19	19.9	23.3	
Semi-final 1	26 October	115	3.07	14	20.7	22.2	
Semi-final 2	2 November	115	3.11	13	19.6	22.3	
Semi-final 3	9 November	115	2.78		18.4	19.8	
Semi-final 4	16 November	115	3.30	13	20.4	22.3	
Semi-final 5	23 November	115	2.91		18.7	20.1	
Live final	30 November	135	3.39	17	22.5	23.2	
Series average	2013	—	3.17	—	21.4	23.9	

^{1} Includes advert breaks
