= Mam talent! series 7 =

Mam talent!
- Series 7
- Hosted by: Marcin Prokop; Szymon Hołownia
- Judges: Małgorzata Foremniak; Agustin Egurrola; Agnieszka Chylińska
- Winner: Adrian Makar

Release
- Original network: TVN
- Original release: 6 September 2014

Series chronology
- ← Previous; Series 6

The seventh series of Mam talent! began airing on TVN on 6 September 2014. The judges' auditions began on 9 June 2014 in Katowice and ended on 8 July in Warsaw.

== Golden buzzer ==
This series will see the introduction of the new golden buzzer, following the concept of the original British series Britain's Got Talent and Germany's Got Talent. During the auditions, as well as the standard buzzers, there was a golden buzzer placed in the centre of the judges' desk. Each judge was allowed to press this buzzer only once, which would automatically send that auditionee straight through to the live semi-finals, regardless of the opinions of the other judges. Presenters Szymon Hołownia and Marcin Prokop were also allowed to press the golden buzzer each once, which means that at most five auditionees were guaranteed their place in the semi-finals this way.

Foremniak used the golden buzzer on the first episode, pressing it during Wrocław auditions for breakdance and contemporary dancer Pielgrzym. Prokop's pressing of the buzzer for dance troupe Barbie Boom in Gdańsk aired on the second episode, followed by Egurrola's buzz for Chechen dance troupe Lovzar on the third episode. Chylińska pressing the buzzer for singer Mateusz Guzowski in Wrocław aired on the fifth episode.

== Auditions ==
=== Open Auditions ===
Open auditions began on 5 April 2014 in Zabrze and concluded on 25 May 2014 in Warsaw. Additional auditions in Kraków and Zakopane were announced on 25 April 2014. This is the first series where open auditions were held in Białystok, Zielona Góra, Kraków and Zakopane.

Date	City	Venue
5 April 2014	Zabrze	House of Music and Dance
6 April 2014	Wrocław	Hotel Mercure Wrocław City Center
12 April 2014	Zielona Góra	Dana Hotel & Spa
13 April 2014	Poznań	Hotel Andersia
26 April 2014	Bydgoszcz	City Community Centre
27 April 2014	Gdańsk	Hotel Mercure Gdańsk Old City
10 May 2014	Kraków	City Cultural Centre
11 May 2014	Zakopane	Zakopane Education Centre
17 May 2014	Rzeszów	Maska Theatre
24 May 2014	Białystok	Gołębiewski Hotel
25 May 2014	Warsaw	Primate's Palace

=== Judges' auditions ===
Judges' auditions with a live audience began on 9 and 10 June in Silesian Theatre in Katowice. These were followed by auditions held in Wrocław, Gdańsk, Kraków and Warsaw.

Date	City	Venue
9–10 June 2014	Katowice	Silesian Theatre
16–17 June 2014	Gdańsk	Wybrzeże Theatre
25–26 June 2014	Wrocław	Wrocław Opera
30 June-1 July 2014	Kraków	Juliusz Słowacki Theatre
7–8 July 2014	Warsaw	Dramatic Theatre

== Semi-finals ==
The live semi-finals will begin on 25 October 2014. Unlike previous years, it will take place in Transcolor Studio in Szeligi.

=== Semi-finalists ===
Golden buzzer

Name of act	Age(s)	Genre	Act	Semi-final	Result
Acroart	25-29	Acrobatics	Acrobatic troupe	2	Finalist
Alter Trio	18-23	Acrobatics	Acrobatic troupe	4	Finalist
Barbie Boom	24-37	Dance	Dance troupe	2	Semi-finalist
Zbigniew "Brozi" Brzozowski	57	Illusion	Illusionist	2	Semi-finalist
Bucket Guys	22-34	Music	Musical band	4	Semi-finalist
Calipso	14	Dance	Classic dance duo	1	Semi-finalist (lost judges' vote)
Cyrkland Kobra	11	Acrobatics	Acrobats	4	Semi-finalist
Krzysztof Drabik	34	Flair bartending		1	Semi-finalist
Dziubek Band	20-40	Music	Band	5	Semi-finalist
F.O.U.R.S. Collective	23-25	Music	Band	4	Semi-finalist
Mateusz Guzowski	18	Singing	Singer	1	Finalist
Krzysztof and Jan	17		Model aircraft show	3	Finalist
Kuba and Sabina	32-34	Music	Band	5	Semi-finalist
Mateusz "Kofi" Kufel	23		Basketball show	5	Semi-finalist
Lekko Pijani	28-43	Music	Band	2	Semi-finalist
Les Chattes	17-24	Dance	Dance troupe	5	Semi-finalist
Adrian "Lipskee" Lipiński	28	Dance	Dancer	5	Finalist
Lowzar	9-17	Dance	Traditional Chechen dance troupe	2	Finalist
Martyna "YaMayka" Majak	27	Acrobatics	Acrobat/dancer	3	Semi-finalist
Adrian Makar	15	Singing	Singer	3	Winner
Berenika Nienadowska	25	Dance	Pole dancer	5	Runner-Up
Julia Olędzka	20	Singing	Singer	4	Finalist
Isabell Otrębus-Larsson	16	Singing	Singer	3	Semi-finalist
Oyama Karate	20-48	Martial arts	Karate show	3	Semi-finalist
Patman Crew	19-25	Dance	Dance troupe	2	Semi-finalist
Anna Patrys	33	Singing	Opera singer	1	Semi-finalist
Pielgrzym	26	Dance	Breakdance/contemporary dancer	2	Semi-finalist
Pin Up Candy	31	Dance	Bourlesque performer	4	Semi-finalist
Izabela Płóciennik	19	Singing	Singer	2	Semi-finalist (lost judges' vote)
Punto Latino	20-50	Music	Latin music band	1	Semi-finalist
Red Pop	22-29	Dance	Dance troupe	1	Semi-finalist
Stowarzyszenie Parkour Białystok	16-25	Acrobatics	Parkour show	5	Semi-finalist (lost judges' vote)
Szał	17-27	Dance	Theatre Dance	3	Semi-finalist
Michał "Miguel Moon" Szuba	29	Music	Flamenco musician	3	Semi-finalist (lost judges' vote)
Śpiewak Grotesque	30-35	Music	Band	5	Semi-finalist
Łukasz Świrk	29	Gymnastics	Gymnast	1	Finalist
Teatr Czarnego Tła	13-29	Theatre	Theatr group	4	Semi-finalist
Top Toys	24-28	Dance	Dance troupe	4	Semi-finalist (lost judges' vote)
Julian Waglewski	25	Acrobatics	Acrobat	1	Semi-finalist
Wolf & The Motherfuckers	21-40	Music	Band	3	Semi-finalist

=== Semi-finals summary ===
Judges' vote

Won the public vote
Won the judges' vote
Lost the judges' vote

==== Semi-final 1 (25 October) ====
- Guest performer: Tetiana Galitsyna

Artist	Order	Act	Buzzes and judges' votes			Application voting		Finished	Result
Artist	Order	Act	Chylińska	Egurrola	Foremniak			Finished	Result
Punto Latino	1	Latin music band				53%	47%	Unknown	Eliminated
Red Pop	2	Dance troupe				77%	23%	Unknown	Eliminated
Krzysztof Drabik	3	Flair bartending				94%	6%	Unknown	Eliminated
Anna Patrys	4	Opera singer				55%	45%	Unknown	Eliminated
Calipso	5	Classic dance duo				85%	15%	Unknown	Top 3 (Lost judges' vote)
Łukasz Świrk	6	Gymnast				96%	4%	1st	Top 3 (Won public vote)
Mateusz Guzowski	7	Singer				83%	17%	Unknown	Top 3 (Won judges' vote)
Julian Waglewski	8	Acrobat				86%	14%	Unknown	Eliminated

==== Semi-final 2 (9 November) ====
- Guest performer: Marcin Marczewski "Patenciarz" (season 2, finalist)

Artist	Order	Act	Buzzes and judges' votes			Application voting		Finished	Result
Artist	Order	Act	Chylińska	Egurrola	Foremniak			Finished	Result
Barbie Boom	1	Dance troupe				29%	71%	Unknown	Eliminated
Lekko Pijani	2	Band				39%	61%	Unknown	Eliminated
Zbigniew "Brozi" Brzozowski	3	Illusionist				95%	5%	Unknown	Eliminated
Pielgrzym	4	Breakdance/contemporary dancer				84%	16%	Unknown	Eliminated
Acroart	5	Acrobatic troupe				88%	12%	Unknown	Top 3 (Won judges' vote)
Patman Crew	6	Dance troupe				86%	14%	Unknown	Eliminated
Izabela Płóciennik	7	Singer				76%	24%	Unknown	Top 3 (Lost judges' vote)
Lowzar	8	Traditional Chechen dance troupe				91%	9%	1st	Top 3 (Won public vote)

==== Semi-final 3 (16 November) ====
- Guest performer: Trio ETC (season 5, finalist)

Artist	Order	Act	Buzzes and judges' votes			Application voting		Finished	Result
Artist	Order	Act	Chylińska	Egurrola	Foremniak			Finished	Result
Oyama Karate	1	Karate show				60%	40%	Unknown	Eliminated
Wolf & The Motherfuckers	2	Band				39%	61%	Unknown	Eliminated
Michał "Miguel Moon" Szuba	3	Flamenco musician				75%	25%	Unknown	Top 3 (Lost judges' vote)
Isabell Otrębus-Larsson	4	Singer				75%	25%	Unknown	Eliminated
Szał	5	Theatre Dance				79%	21%	Unknown	Eliminated
Krzysztof and Jan	6	Model aircraft show				83%	17%	Unknown	Top 3 (Won judges' vote)
Martyna "YaMayka" Majak	7	Acrobat/dancer				93%	7%	Unknown	Eliminated
Adrian Makar	8	Singer				84%	16%	1st	Top 3 (Won public vote)

==== Semi-final 4 (22 November) ====
- Guest performer: MultiVisual (season 5, finalist)

Artist	Order	Act	Buzzes and judges' votes			Application voting		Finished	Result
Artist	Order	Act	Chylińska	Egurrola	Foremniak			Finished	Result
Bucket Guys	1	Musical band				78%	22%	Unknown	Eliminated
F.O.U.R.S. Collective	2	Band				46%	54%	Unknown	Eliminated
Teatr Czarnego Tła	3	Theatr group				90%	10%	Unknown	Eliminated
Cyrkland Kobra	4	Acrobats				84%	16%	Unknown	Eliminated
Pin Up Candy	5	Bourlesque performer				42%	58%	Unknown	Eliminated
Top Toys	6	Dance troupe				86%	14%	Unknown	Top 3 (Lost judges' vote)
Julia Olędzka	7	Singer				77%	23%	Unknown	Top 3 (Won judges' vote)
Alter Trio	8	Acrobatic troupe				94%	6%	1st	Top 3 (Won public vote)

==== Semi-final 5 (29 November) ====
- Guest performer:Santiago Gil (season 6, finalist)

Artist	Order	Act	Buzzes and judges' votes			Application voting		Finished	Result
Artist	Order	Act	Chylińska	Egurrola	Foremniak			Finished	Result
Dziubek Band	1	Band				83%	17%	Unknown	Eliminated
Śpiewak Grotesque	2	Band				18%	72%	Unknown	Eliminated
Mateusz "Kofi" Kufel	3	Basketball show				92%	8%	Unknown	Eliminated
Les Chattes	4	Dancer				78%	22%	Unknown	Eliminated
Stowarzyszenie Parkour Białystok	5	Parkour show				91%	9%	Unknown	Top 3 (Lost judges' vote)
Kuba and Sabina	6	Band				59%	41%	Unknown	Eliminated
Adrian "Lipskee" Lipiński	7	Dancer				88%	12%	Unknown	Top 3 (Won judges' vote)
Berenika Nienadowska	8	Pole dancer				89%	11%	1st	Top 3 (Won public vote)

== Final (6 December) ==
Artist	Order	Act	Finished
Adrian Makar	1	Singer	1st
Adrian "Lipskee" Lipiński	2	Dancer	Unknown
Krzysztof and Jan	3	Model aircraft show	Unknown
Alter Trio	4	Acrobatic troupe	Unknown
Acroart	5	Acrobatic troupe	Unknown
Mateusz Guzowski	6	Singer	3rd
Berenika Nienadowska	7	Pole dancer	2nd
Lowzar	8	Traditional Chechen dance troupe	Unknown
Julia Olędzka	9	Singer	Unknown
Łukasz Świrk	10	Gymnast	Unknown

== Ratings ==
Summary of episode ratings
Episode	Date	Official rating (millions)	Weekly rank	Share (%)	Share 16-49 (%)	Source(s)
Auditions 1	6 September	2.75	16	20.5	21.6	
Auditions 2	13 September	3.16	10	22.2	25.0	
Auditions 3	20 September	3.47	10	22.0	25.7	
Auditions 4	27 September	3.74	7	24.4	24.5	
Auditions 5	4 October	3.58	12	23.7	25.8	
Auditions 6	11 October	2.87	18	18.5	20.0	
Auditions 7	18 October	3.67	13	23.1	26.6	
Semi-final 1	25 October	3.60	10	22.8	23.3	
Semi-final 2	8 November	3.44	12	22.8	24.2	
Semi-final 3	15 November	3.47	13	20.9	20.3	
Semi-final 4	22 November	3.48	13	21.6	22.0	
Semi-final 5	29 November	2.68	20+		17.9	
Finale	6 December	3.90	11	23.8	23.6	
Series average	2014	3.37	—	22.1	23.0	
