= Primate's Palace =

Primate's Palace may refer to the following buildings:

- Primate's Palace, Bratislava, Slovakia.
- Primate's Palace, Warsaw, Poland.
