= Stanisław Staszic Memorial =

Monument in Warsaw, Poland

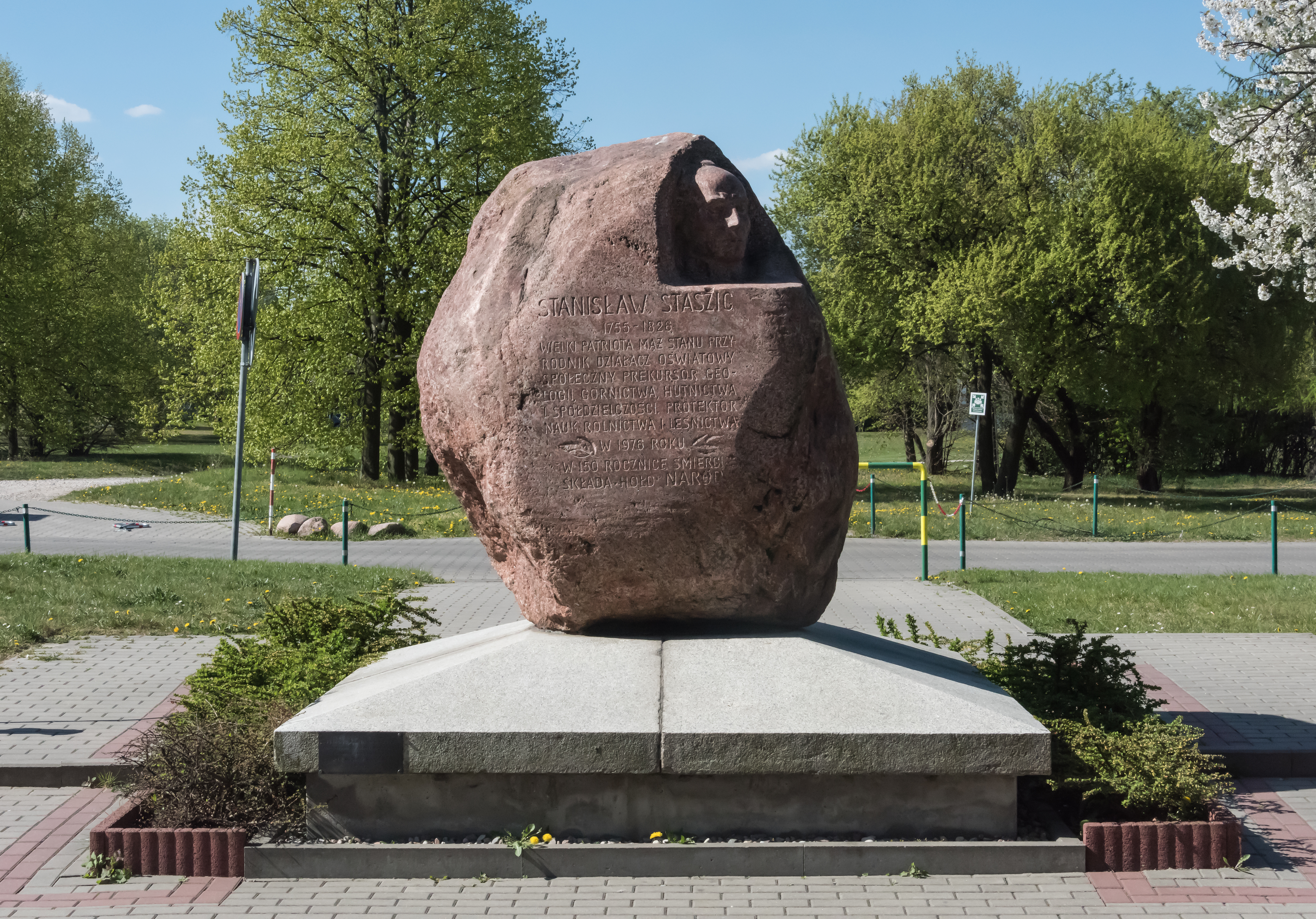
- The monument in 2020.
- Interactive map of Stanisław Staszic Memorial
- Location: 159 Nowoursynowska Street, Ursynów, Warsaw, Poland
- Coordinates: 52°09′43.2″N 21°02′46.19″E
- Designer: Stanisław Lipski
- Type: Rock relief, bust
- Material: Stone (sculpture); granite (pedestal)
- Height: c. 2.5 m
- Opening date: 1976 (unveiling at the original location); 2007 (unveiling at the current location)
- Dedicated to: Stanisław Staszic

The Stanisław Staszic Memorial (Polish: Pomnik Stanisława Staszica) is a memorial in Warsaw, Poland, placed at the campus of the Warsaw University of Life Sciences, at 159 Nowoursynowska Street, in the neighbourhood of Stary Służew within the district of Ursynów. It is dedicated to Stanisław Staszic, a leading figure of the Polish Enlightenment in the 18th century, a writer, activist, geologist and geographer. The monument consists of a bust carved into a side of a large rock. It was made by sculptor Stanisław Lipski and unveiled in 1976 in front of the Primate Palace at 13/15 Senatorska Street, before being moved to its current location in 2007.

== History ==
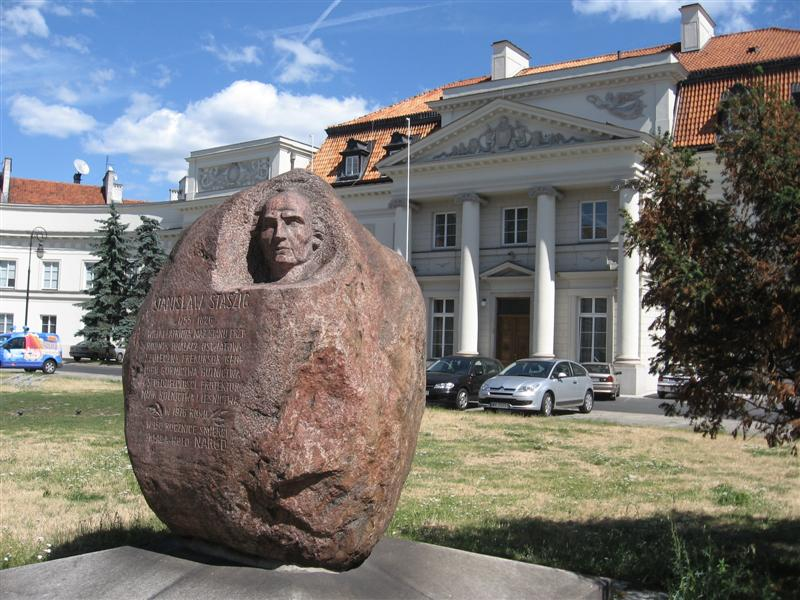
The monument in front of the Primate Palace in 2006

The monument, made by Stanisław Lipski, was erected in 1976, on the 150th anniversary of Stanisław Staszic's death. It was placed next to the Primate Palace at 13/15 Senatorska Street, owned by the Warsaw University of Life Sciences. The monument was proposed by the Society of the Friends of Warsaw, and financed, among other donors, by the association of school's alumni.

The monument has the form of a large glacial erratic rock, donated by the Museum of the Earth of the Polish Academy of Sciences, with a bust of Staszic carved within it. It was planned to erect a statue leaning onto the rock, however this was never realised.

After the building was sold by the school, it was proposed to different location, such as in front of the 14th Stanisław Staszic Genera Education High School, or onto the courtyard of the University of Warsaw Library. However, the creator of the monument rejected either of the ideas.

In 2007, during the renovations of the palace's courtyard, the monument was removed and placed in a warehouse in Julinek. From there, it was then moved to the campus of the Warsaw University of Life Sciences, and placed in front of the Faculty of Wood Technology at 159 Nowoursynowska Street.

== Design ==
The monument consists of a large glacial erratic rock placed on a low granite pedestal. It features a bust of Stanisław Staszic, carved into a niche at one of its upper corners. The monument is around 2.5 metres tall. On its side, it bears the following inscription:

Stanisław Staszic
1755−1826
Wielki patriota, mąż stanu, przyrodnik, działacz oświatowy, społeczny. Prekursor geologii, górnictwa, hutnictwa i spółdzielczości. Protektor nauk rolnictwa i leśnictwa. W 1976 roku w 150 rocznicę śmierci składa hołd – Naród

English translation:
Stanisław Staszic
1755−1826
Great patriot, statesman, naturalist, activists for the education and society. Forerunner of the geology, mining, metallurgy, and cooperation. Protector of agricultural and forestry sciences. In 1976, in the 150th anniversary of his death, we pay our tribute – the Nation
