= Shadow theatre Fireflies =

Fireflies (shadow theatre) is an amateur collective which was created in November, 2010 in the city Chernihiv (Ukraine) and works in the genre of shadow theatre. A team Fireflies became the semifinalist of the talent show in television format of Got talent "Ukraine's Got Talent" in Ukraine, "Minuta slavy" in Russia, and also became the finalist and took the fourth place in the show "Mam Talent!" in Poland, first presented the genre of shadow theatre there.

== About the team ==
For the first time the participants of the shadow theatre Fireflies appeared on the professional stage in November, 2010 within the framework of the International festival of students work "We are together", Bryansk. The members of the team are the students of different specialities of the Chernihiv National Technological university, who are in spare from studies time engaged in a choreography, vocal and other creative directions. A festival experiment in the genre of shadow theatre brought the collective Grand Prix of the competition. Active creative life of the theatre began after that. The team Fireflies performs on the numerous municipal, regional and international stages, takes part in various festivals, competitions, solemn ceremonies, bonuses and other events. The theatre was the participant of the III Closing Ceremony of the Odesa International Film Festival, the Rewarding Ceremony of the International festival-competition "Choice of the year 2012", Multidisciplinary international festival of modern art "Gogolfest 2012", Festival "Qatar Spring Festival 2013", the Opening Ceremony of the IV Odesa International Film Festival. The shadow theatre Fireflies is also involved in social projects. The first solo concert of the collective took place within the framework of eleemosynary action on collecting money on medications for oncology sick children of the National children's specialized hospital of "OXMADET" in Kyiv. All the income from the sale of the tickets for the concert was sent to the purchase of the necessary medications. The distinctive feature of Fireflies works is the creation of maximally realistic characters in shade by means of the plastic arts of human body. Raising of the theatre reflects the most various themes and plots. The emotional filling and actors acting allow to show in shade histories of fairy-tale personages, adventure, love, human experiencing, global problems etc.

== Talent shows ==
"Ukraine's Got Talent", Ukraine (3 season, 2011)
In 2011 the shadow theatre Fireflies accepted the invitation to participate in the talent show on the TV channel STB "Ukraine's got talent". In spite of the fact that at that moment the collective was only three months old, it was able to become the semifinalist of the project and entered the number of the 15 best talents of country. For the first time in three seasons the audience of the show and the jury saw the performance of the representatives in this genre. In the jury there was a dancer and choreographer Vlad Iama, TV-anchorwoman, journalist and stage-director Slava Frolova and TV-anchorman, producer, showman Igor Kondratiuk. The team of the theatre had the opportunity to show two performances : "Plasticine" and "Fairy-tale about Aladdin".

"Minuta slavy", Russia (6 season, 2011)
After the successful performance in the project "Ukraine's got talent", the shadow theatre Fireflies took part in another similar talent-show "Minute of glory", Russia in 2011. The project was transferred on the "First channel". In this project the theatre repeated the achievement and got the rank of the semifinalist. A TV-anchorman Aleksandr Masliakov, an actress Larisa Guzeeva, an actor Aleksandr Mykhailov, a statesman, a layer Pavel Astakhov and a boxer Vitali Klitschko were in the jury. With the last one the theatre has an interesting story. When a boxer made positive comments concerning his compatriots, the collective Fireflies decided to thank Vitalii for this and presented him with the particle of their performance - an essential element in the form of a flower.

"Mam talent!", Poland (6 season, 2013)
The team Fireflies took part in the Polish version of the talent-show format Got talent - "Mam talent"! on the TV channel TVN in autumn 2013. The jury consisting of a singer Agneshki Chilinskoi, an actress Mavgozhaty Foremniak and a choreographer Agustina Egurolly highly estimated the performances of the theatre on every round of the competition and marked the permanent technical and emotional height of the performances of the team. Participating in this show, Fireflies created two new works - the first one was dedicated to the problems of ecology on the planet and was carried out under the hit of Michael Jackson "The Earth Song", and the second one touched the history of Poland, its participation in the Second World War and the post-war revival.

«Das Supertalent» Germany (Season 8, 2014)
On November 15, the German television station RTL broadcast was shown an episode of the German talent show Das Supertalent, which was attended by a team of shadow theater Fireflies. Project participants were evaluated Dieter Bohlen, lead singer of Modern Talking, model and TV presenter Lena Gercke, designer Guido Maria Kretschmer and American choreographer and model Bruce Darnell. Shadow Theatre represented Ukraine at the European show and showed the audience and judges their work "Save the Earth!", Which won the accolades of the jury and the audience's applause.

== Achievements ==
- November 2010 - the VII International festival of students work "We are together", Bryansk, the laureates of the I degree in the nomination of original genre, Grand Prix of the festival;
- May 2011 - Talent show "Ukraine's got talent" (Ukraine) the 3-d season, semifinalists (the best 15);
- December 2011 - Talent show "Minute of glory" (Russia) the 6 season, semifinalists;
- May 2012 - the International festival-competition of children's and youth work "Snova tsvetut kashtany" Kyiv, laureates of the I degree in the nomination of original genre, Grand Prix of the festival;
- June 2012 - Project "Idea X", finalists;
- September 2013 - Prizewinners of the International festival of street theaters "My FOOT in Koktebel";
- December 2013 - Talent show "Mam Talent"! (Poland) the 6 season, finalists;
- September 2014 - Competition of social advertising in the International Festival of actual animation and media arts LINOLEUM 2014, winners;
- November 2014 - talent show «Das Supertalent» (Germany) 8 season, semifinalists;
- August 2015 - talent show "France Digital Talent" (France), winners;
- September 2015 - "Save the Earth" won Excellent Short award at 2015 Handle Climate Change Film Festival (HCCFF) in China.
