= Agustin Egurrola =

Polish dancer

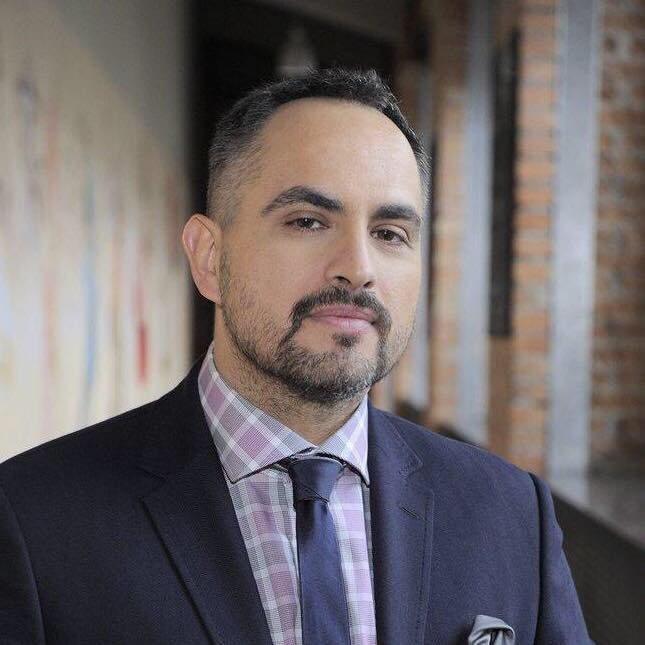
- Born: Agustin Marek Egurrola; September 8, 1968 (age 57); Warsaw, Poland
- Occupations: Dancer; Choreographer; Television personality
- Spouse: Diana Egurrola m.2020
- Partner: Nina Tyrka - 2015

Agustin Egurrola (born 8 September 1968, in Warsaw) is a Polish professional dancer, choreographer, international judge of ballroom and modern dance competitions, and television personality.

== Biography ==
Egurrola's mother was Polish while his father was Cuban.

He is the multiple Polish Champion in Latin dance and South-American Show Dance. His dancing partner was Joanna Szokalska, with whom he gained twelve titles of Polish Champion. They also represented Poland in multiple World and European Championships.

Since 2007 Egurrola has served as a judge on the Polish television series You Can Dance: Po prostu tańcz!. In 2013 he also joined the judging panel of Poland's Got Talent, replacing Robert Kozyra. He left TVN in 2019 and joined the competing station TVP. In 2026, he returned to the program as a judge.
