= Poland in the Eurovision Song Contest 2025 =

- Eurovision Song Contest 2025
- Participating broadcaster: Telewizja Polska (TVP)
- Country: Poland
- Selection process: Wielki finał polskich kwalifikacji
- Selection date: 14 February 2025

Competing entry
- Song: "Gaja"
- Artist: Justyna Steczkowska
- Songwriters: Dominic Buczkowski-Wojtaszek; Emilian Waluchowski; Justyna Steczkowska; Patryk Kumór

Placement
- Semi-final result: Qualified (7th, 85 points)
- Final result: 14th, 156 points

Participation chronology

Poland was represented at the Eurovision Song Contest 2025 with the song "Gaja", written by Dominic Buczkowski-Wojtaszek, Emilian Waluchowski, Justyna Steczkowska, and Patryk Kumór, and performed by Steczkowska herself. The Polish participating broadcaster, Telewizja Polska (TVP), organised the national final Wielki finał polskich kwalifikacji in order to select its entry for the contest.

Poland was drawn to compete in the first semi-final of the Eurovision Song Contest which took place on 13 May 2025. Performing during the show in position 2, "Gaja" was announced among the top 10 entries of the first semi-final and therefore qualified to compete in the final on 17 May. It was later revealed that Poland placed seventh out of the 15 participating countries in the semi-final with 85 points. In the final, Poland performed in position 15 and placed fourteenth out of the 26 participating countries, scoring 156 points.

== Background ==
Prior to the 2025 contest, Telewizja Polska (TVP) had participated in the Eurovision Song Contest representing Poland twenty-six times since its first entry in 1994. Its highest placement in the contest, to this point, had been second place, achieved with its debut entry in 1994, "To nie ja!" performed by Edyta Górniak. It had only reached the top ten on two other occasions, when "Keine Grenzen – Żadnych granic" performed Ich Troje finished seventh in 2003, and when "Color of Your Life" performed by Michał Szpak finished eighth in 2016. Following the introduction of semi-finals for the 2004 contest, Poland managed to qualify for the final eight times; additionally, TVP was absent from the contest in 2012 and 2013. In 2024, "The Tower" performed by Luna failed to qualify for the final.

As part of its duties as participating broadcaster, TVP organises the selection of its entry in the Eurovision Song Contest and broadcasts the event in the country. In 2022 and 2023, the broadcaster selected its entry for the contest through a national final show titled Tu bije serce Europy! Wybieramy hit na Eurowizję!, while in 2024 its entry was selected internally. TVP confirmed its participation in the 2025 contest on 8 November 2024, announcing that it would return to selecting its entry through a televised final.

== Before Eurovision ==
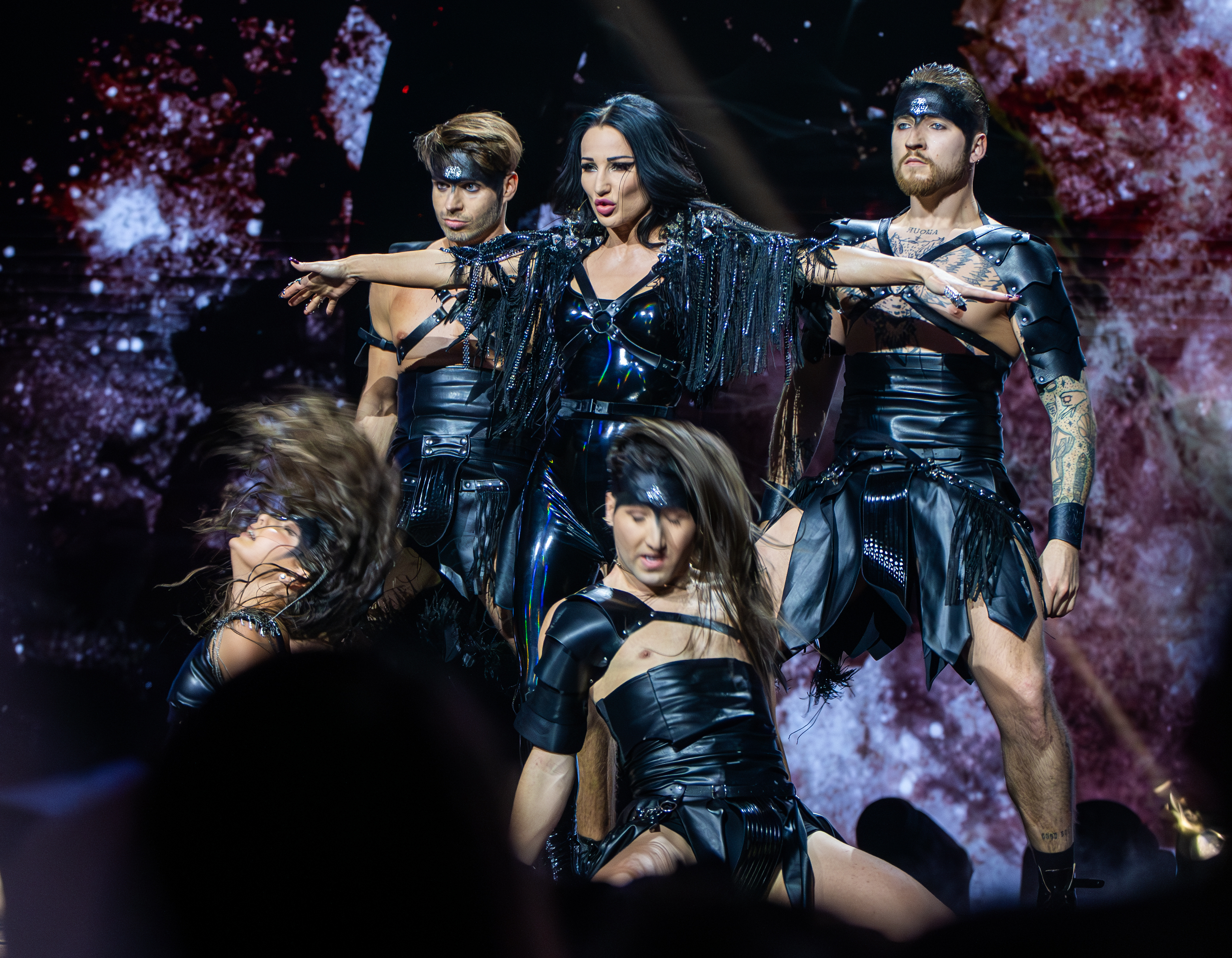
Justyna Steczkowska, the winner of Wielki finał polskich kwalifikacji, during the competition final.

=== Wielki finał polskich kwalifikacji ===
Wielki finał polskich kwalifikacji ("The grand final of the Polish qualifiers") was the national final format developed by TVP to select its entry for the Eurovision Song Contest 2025. The competition took place on 14 February 2025 at the TVP Headquarters in Warsaw, hosted by Artur Orzech and 2016 Polish entrant Michał Szpak, with Aleksandra Budka and Grzegorz Dobek acting as the green room hosts. The show was broadcast on TVP2, TVP Polonia and TVP Wilno, as well as online via the streaming platform TVP VOD and internationally with English voice-over translation via the Eurovision Song Contest's official YouTube channel.

==== Format ====
The selection of the competing entries for the national final took place over two stages. In the first stage, artists and songwriters could apply for the competition through an online submission form. In the second stage, a fifteen-member selection committee with members appointed by TVP among music industry professionals, journalists and Eurovision fans was in charge of reviewing the received submissions and selecting a shortlist of 25 participants based on the ten favourites of each member. The third stage consisted of all but five of the shortlisted entries – the three highest scoring entries in the previous stage and two artists deemed by the selection committee to have "established musical careers" – being additionally performed at an audition round held on 19 December 2024 in Warsaw, after which ten finalists (plus two backups) were unanimously selected from these by the committee and announced on 14 January 2025. TVP reserved the option to select up to three wildcards among artists who did not pass the previous phase, which was later invoked to include an eleventh finalist, who was announced on 3 February 2025. The eleven selected artists took part in a final on 14 February 2025, where the winner was determined exclusively by public votes cast through SMS messages.

==== Competing entries ====
On 8 November 2024, TVP opened a submission period where artists and composers would be able to submit their entries for the competition until 4 December 2024; shortly before the closing, the deadline was extended until the following 8 December. Applicants were required to hold Polish citizenship for their entries to qualify to compete. At the closing of the window, 224 entries had been submitted.

The selection committee consisted of Piotr Klatt (chairperson), Anna Ceynowa, Anna Karna, Barbara Popiołek, Grzegorz Frątczak, Kamil Kozbuch, Karol Paciorek, Konrad Szczęsny, Maciej Kancerek, Małgorzata Kosturkiewicz, Marcin Wojciechowski, Paulina Sawicka, Paweł Karpiński, Tomasz Sołowiński and Tycjana Acquasanta. Sara James withdrew her participation before the scheduled announcement of the finalists and was replaced by Janusz Radek (who was the first backup), while Teo, who had previously made the shortlist of acts but failed to advance due to citizenship requirements, was later awarded a wildcard. Among the selected competing artists was Justyna Steczkowska, who represented Poland in 1995.

Key: Entry withdrawn Replacement entry

Artist	Song	Songwriter(s)
Chrust	"Tempo"	Dariusz Mrozek; Karol Konop; Krzysztof Falkowski; Małgorzata Oleszczuk
Daria Marx	"Let It Burn"	Fredrik Moller; Maria Broberg; Peter Boström
Dominik Dudek	"Hold the Light"	Dominik Dudek; Teodora Špirić; Tom Oehler
Janusz Radek	"In Cosmic Mist"	Janusz Radek
Justyna Steczkowska	"Gaja"	Dominic Buczkowski-Wojtaszek; Emilian Waluchowski; Justyna Steczkowska; Patryk Kumór
Kuba Szmajkowski	"Pray"	Angelino Markenhorn; Joakim Andersson; Tom Martensson; William Naesh
Marien	"Can't Hide"	Amelia Komosińska; Magdalena Wójcik; Maria Nieszpaur
Sara James	"Tiny Heart"	Michael Burek; René Miller; Sara Egwu-James
Sonia Maselik	"Rumours"	Adam Związek; Aleksandra Smoczyńska; Juliusz Kamil Kuźnik; Paweł Tetłak; Sonia Maselik-Tomczyk; Susie Jakubowski
Swada and Niczos	"Lusterka"	Nika Jurczuk; Wiktor Szczygieł
Teo	"Immortal"	Jakub Krupski; Jeremi Sikorski; Teo Tomczuk
Tynsky	"Miracle"	Chloe Copoloff; Francis Karel; Riddick; Tynsky

==== Final ====
The final took place on 14 February 2025. In addition to the competing entries, the guest performers included 2024 Croatian entrant Baby Lasagna with "Rim Tim Tagi Dim", "Don’t Hate Yourself but Don't Love Yourself Too Much" and "Biggie Boom Boom", and host Michał Szpak with "Color of Your Life" and "Bondage". Justyna Steczkowska was declared the winner with "Gaja".

Final – 14 February 2025
R/O	Artist	Song	Televote	Place
1	Chrust	"Tempo"	4,755	4
2	Kuba Szmajkowski	"Pray"	3,199	5
3	Justyna Steczkowska	"Gaja"	31,574	1
4	Tynsky	"Miracle"	1,173	9
5	Daria Marx	"Let It Burn"	647	11
6	Swada and Niczos	"Lusterka"	19,022	2
7	Janusz Radek	"In Cosmic Mist"	3,087	7
8	Marien	"Can't Hide"	1,121	10
9	Teo	"Immortal"	3,144	6
10	Sonia Maselik	"Rumours"	1,368	8
11	Dominik Dudek	"Hold the Light"	11,194	3

== At Eurovision ==
The Eurovision Song Contest 2025 took place at St. Jakobshalle in Basel, Switzerland, and consisted of two semi-finals held on the respective dates of 13 and 15 May and the final on 17 May 2025. All nations with the exceptions of the host country and the "Big Five" (France, Germany, Italy, Spain and the United Kingdom) were required to qualify from one of two semi-finals in order to compete in the final; the top ten countries from each semi-final progressed to the final. During the allocation draw held on 28 January 2025, Poland was drawn to compete in the first semi-final, performing in the first half of the show. The shows' producers then decided the running order for the semi-finals; Poland was set to perform in position 2.

Poland qualified for the final, finishing in seventh place in the semi-final with 85 points. During the final, Poland performed in 15th position following Italy and preceding Germany. In the end, Poland finished in fourteenth place with 156 points, finishing twenty-fourth in the jury voting with 17 points and in seventh place with the televoting with 139 points.

=== Voting ===
==== Points awarded to Poland ====
Points awarded to Poland (Semi-final 1)
Score	Televote
12 points	Netherlands
10 points	Belgium; Spain
8 points	
7 points	Iceland; Norway; Sweden
6 points	Rest of the World; Switzerland
5 points	Ukraine
4 points	Cyprus; Portugal
3 points	Italy
2 points	Albania
1 point	Azerbaijan; Croatia

Points awarded to Poland (Final)
Score	Televote	Jury
12 points	Iceland; Ireland	
10 points	Belgium; Netherlands; United Kingdom	
8 points	Czechia; Norway; Spain	
7 points	Denmark; France; Germany	
6 points	San Marino; Sweden	
5 points	Austria	Australia
4 points	Rest of the World; Cyprus	Azerbaijan
3 points	Italy; Luxembourg; Switzerland; Ukraine	
2 points	Malta	Belgium; Estonia; Germany
1 point	Australia	France; Israel

==== Points awarded by Poland ====
Points awarded by Poland (Semi-final 1)
Score	Televote
12 points	Ukraine
10 points	Albania
8 points	Estonia
7 points	Sweden
6 points	Iceland
5 points	Norway
4 points	Netherlands
3 points	Portugal
2 points	Croatia
1 point	San Marino

Points awarded by Poland (Final)
Score	Televote	Jury
12 points	Ukraine	Switzerland
10 points	Estonia	Netherlands
8 points	Sweden	Italy
7 points	Austria	Austria
6 points	Lithuania	Lithuania
5 points	Germany	Albania
4 points	Albania	Greece
3 points	Norway	France
2 points	Latvia	Norway
1 point	Finland	United Kingdom

==== Detailed voting results ====
Each participating broadcaster assembles a five-member jury panel consisting of music industry professionals who are citizens of the country they represent. Each jury, and individual jury member, is required to meet a strict set of criteria regarding professional background, as well as diversity in gender and age. No member of a national jury was permitted to be related in any way to any of the competing acts in such a way that they cannot vote impartially and independently. The individual rankings of each jury member as well as the nation's televoting results were released shortly after the grand final.

The following members comprised the Polish jury:

- Jan Stokłosa
- Krystian Ochman (represented Poland in the Eurovision Song Contest 2022)
- Anna Jurksztowicz
- Katarzyna Walczak
- Tycjana Acquasanta

Detailed voting results from Poland (Semi-final 1)
R/O	Country	Televote	
R/O	Country	Rank	Points
01	Iceland	5	6
02	Poland		
03	Slovenia	12	
04	Estonia	3	8
05	Ukraine	1	12
06	Sweden	4	7
07	Portugal	8	3
08	Norway	6	5
09	Belgium	11	
10	Azerbaijan	14	
11	San Marino	10	1
12	Albania	2	10
13	Netherlands	7	4
14	Croatia	9	2
15	Cyprus	13	

Detailed voting results from Poland (Final)
R/O	Country	Jury							Televote	
R/O	Country	Juror A	Juror B	Juror C	Juror D	Juror E	Rank	Points	Rank	Points
01	Norway	15	5	12	8	20	9	2	8	3
02	Luxembourg	14	15	5	24	21	19		24	
03	Estonia	10	11	18	6	23	15		2	10
04	Israel	4	20	21	25	18	18		12	
05	Lithuania	11	18	17	2	6	5	6	5	6
06	Spain	6	24	20	22	14	21		20	
07	Ukraine	8	17	8	14	17	17		1	12
08	United Kingdom	13	12	13	17	4	10	1	25	
09	Austria	7	3	10	4	3	4	7	4	7
10	Iceland	9	14	16	23	19	23		13	
11	Latvia	16	7	6	21	12	11		9	2
12	Netherlands	1	2	14	3	2	2	10	14	
13	Finland	17	21	25	19	13	24		10	1
14	Italy	5	8	2	1	10	3	8	11	
15	Poland									
16	Germany	18	13	22	5	9	13		6	5
17	Greece	12	16	3	12	15	7	4	17	
18	Armenia	19	25	23	18	24	25		15	
19	Switzerland	2	1	1	7	1	1	12	18	
20	Malta	20	19	24	9	7	20		22	
21	Portugal	22	23	19	10	8	22		19	
22	Denmark	21	10	11	20	5	12		21	
23	Sweden	24	9	7	11	22	16		3	8
24	France	23	4	9	15	11	8	3	16	
25	San Marino	3	22	15	16	25	14		23	
26	Albania	25	6	4	13	16	6	5	7	4
