= Pray (Alicja song) =

2026 song by Alicja

Single by Alicja
- Language: English
- Released: 5 February 2026
- Genre: Gospel; hip-hop; R&B; soul
- Length: 3:00
- Label: Tenace
- Songwriters: Alicja Szemplińska; Sinclair Alan Malcolm; Weronika Gabryelczyk
- Producer: Weronika Gabryelczyk

Alicja singles chronology
| "Napraw mnie" (with Hodak and 2K) (2024) | "Pray" (2026) | "Song of Death" (with Urbanski) (2026) |

Music video
- "Pray" on YouTube

Eurovision Song Contest 2026 entry
- Country: Poland
- Artist: Alicja
- Language: English
- Composers: Alicja Szemplińska; Sinclair Alan Malcolm; Weronika Gabryelczyk
- Lyricists: Alicja Szemplińska; Sinclair Alan Malcolm; Weronika Gabryelczyk

Finals performance
- Semi-final result: 2nd
- Semi-final points: 247
- Final result: 12th
- Final points: 150

Entry chronology
- ◄ "Gaja" (2025)

"Pray" is a song by Polish singer-songwriter Alicja, co-written with Sinclair Alan Malcolm and Weronika Gabryelczyk. Self-described as a reflection on her journey toward personal growth and artistic independence, the song was released on 5 February 2026 through the British independent record label Tenace Records. It represented Poland in the Eurovision Song Contest 2026, and finished in twelfth place at the final. Musically, it blends elements of gospel, hip-hop, R&B and soul.

== Background and composition ==
"Pray" was written by Alicja Szemplińska, Sinclair Alan Malcolm and Weronika Gabryelczyk. Despite its title, the song does not carry a strictly religious meaning, with the concept of prayer used as a metaphor for overcoming personal struggles and finding inner strength, freedom and independence. Alicja has stated the song is an expression of her own experiences within the music industry and of her desire to remain authentic to her artistic identity regardless of commercial expectations, describing it as "personal". The track blends elements of gospel, hip-hop, R&B and soul, which she describes as "all the influences that have shaped [her] as an artist"; it was initially conceived as a slower, gospel-inspired ballad before evolving into a more dynamic structure during production.

== Music video and promotion ==
Along with the song's premiere, an accompanying music video was released. Directed by Martyna Byczkowska, it is set in Alicja's hometown of Ciechanów and centres on locations of personal significance to the artist, such as the parish church and the 1st Zygmunt Krasiński General Education Liceum. It features a schoolgirl portraying young Alicja, as well as local residents, her relatives and boyfriend. The music video incorporates familiar cultural tropes for domestic Polish audiences, such as large-panel-system housing, a Polish People's Republic-era school gymnasium and an old-fashioned apartment marked by religious symbols.

To further promote the song, Alicja confirmed her intent to participate in several Eurovision pre-parties, including Eurovision in Concert 2026 on 11 April and the London Eurovision Party 2026 on 19 April.

== Critical reception ==
"Pray" did not receive a clear consensus from Polish or international critics. In a review for Onet, Mateusz Kamiński characterised it as the "most surprising" entry in Finał krajowych kwalifikacji, noting that the opening church organ and gospel vocals serve to "mislead the listener" into expecting a traditional ballad. He highlighted the sudden transition into a sharp trap rhythm and described the track as innovative and exploratory within the Polish music scene, before concluding that the song serves as a significant point in Alicja's discography regardless of the contest's outcome. Writing for RGM, Quincy Dominic offered a highly positive review, describing the track as "nothing short of phenomenal" and stating that it "positions [Alicja] as an artist capable of combining technical skill with emotional storytelling" through its blend of trap elements and "soaring" vocals. Within Polish media, Alicja's vocal delivery in the song drew comparisons to that of Beyoncé. The song also received endorsements from notable Polish figures, including Justyna Steczkowska (1995 and 2025 Polish Eurovision representative), who stated she would "keep her fingers crossed" for Alicja to "reach the top".

== Eurovision Song Contest ==
=== Finał krajowych kwalifikacji ===
Finał krajowych kwalifikacji was the national final format developed by TVP in order to select its entry for the Eurovision Song Contest 2026. The competition consisted of a final aired on 7 March 2026, with the winner selected exclusively by a public vote and announced the following day. Eight finalists, including Alicja with "Pray", were announced on 14 January 2026. She won the final with 26,092 votes, including 20,350 cast via the TVP VOD application and 5,742 cast via SMS.

=== At Eurovision ===
The Eurovision Song Contest 2026 took place at the Wiener Stadthalle in Vienna, Austria, and consisted of two semi-finals held on the respective dates of 12 and 14 May and the final on 16 May 2026. During the allocation draw held on 12 January 2026, Poland was drawn to compete in the first semi-final, performing in the second half of the show. Alicja was later drawn to perform fourteenth, after San Marino's Senhit and before Serbia's Lavina.

== Release history ==
Release dates and formats for "Pray"
| Region | Date | Format(s) | Version | Label | Ref. |
|---|---|---|---|---|---|
| Various | 5 February 2026 | Digital download; streaming | Original | Tenace | |
| Various | 8 May 2026 | Digital download; streaming | Gospel | Tenace | |
