= Martyna Byczkowska =

Polish actress (born 1995)

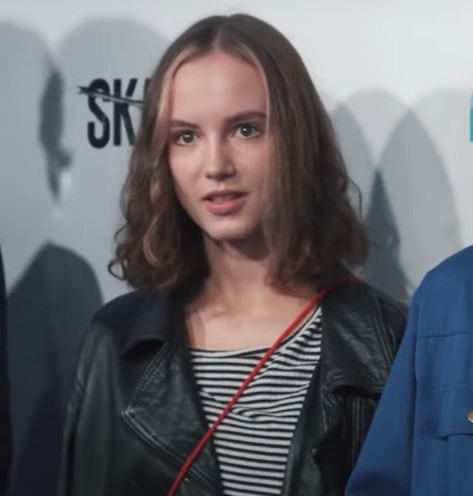
- Byczkowska in 2021
- Born: 26 November 1995 (age 30); Gdynia, Poland
- Education: National Academy of Dramatic Art
- Occupation: Actress
- Years active: 2017–present

Martyna Byczkowska (Polish pronunciation: [marˈtɘ.na bɘt͡ʂˈkɔf.ska]; born 26 November 1995) is a Polish actress.

== Biography ==
Byczkowska was born in Gdynia and grew up in Gdańsk and Kartuzy. She was a swimmer in her youth. At the age of 18, she moved to Warsaw to attend the National Academy of Dramatic Art, and graduated in 2019. After graduating, she began acting at the Teatr Dramatyczny in Warsaw. She was featured on the cover of Elle Polska in April 2024.

In 2026, she wrote and directed the music video for "Pray" by Alicja, which was Poland's submission to the Eurovision Song Contest 2026.

=== Personal life ===
Byczkowska is in a relationship with Polish rapper Quebonafide.

== Filmography ==
=== As actress ===
==== Film ====
| Year | Title | Role | Notes | Ref. |
|---|---|---|---|---|
| 2017 | Man Proposes, God Disposes | Kinga | | |
| 2018 | Ding Dong | Granddaughter | Short film | |
| 2022 | Na chwilę, na zawsze | Pola | | |
| 2022 | Obudź się | Zosia | | |
| 2023 | Wspaniałe kilka minut | Eliza Zarakowska | Short film | |
| 2024 | Rzeczy niezbędne | Bride | | |
| 2024 | Skrzyżowanie | Justyna | | |
| 2025 | Nieprzyjaciel | Ania | | |
| 2025 | Chopin, a Sonata in Paris | Maria Wodzińska | | |
| 2025 | LARP: Love, Trolls and Other Quests | Helena Kuntarz | | |

==== Television ====
| Year | Title | Role | Notes | Ref. |
|---|---|---|---|---|
| 2018 | O mnie się nie martw | Julia Gąsowska | 3 episodes | |
| 2018 | Druga szansa | Young patient | 2 episodes | |
| 2020 | The Woods | Kamila Kopińska | 4 episodes | |
| 2021–2023 | The Convict | Hania Mazur | Main role; 17 episodes | |
| 2022 | Mental | Lena Gradziuk | 8 episodes | |
| 2023 | Absolute Beginners | Lena Głowacka | Main role; 6 episodes | |
| 2023–present | 1670 | Aniela | Main role | |

=== Other credits ===
==== Music videos ====
| Year | Title | Artist | Director | Writer | Ref. |
|---|---|---|---|---|---|
| 2026 | "Pray" | Alicja | Yes | Yes | |
