= Paul Dixon (musician) =

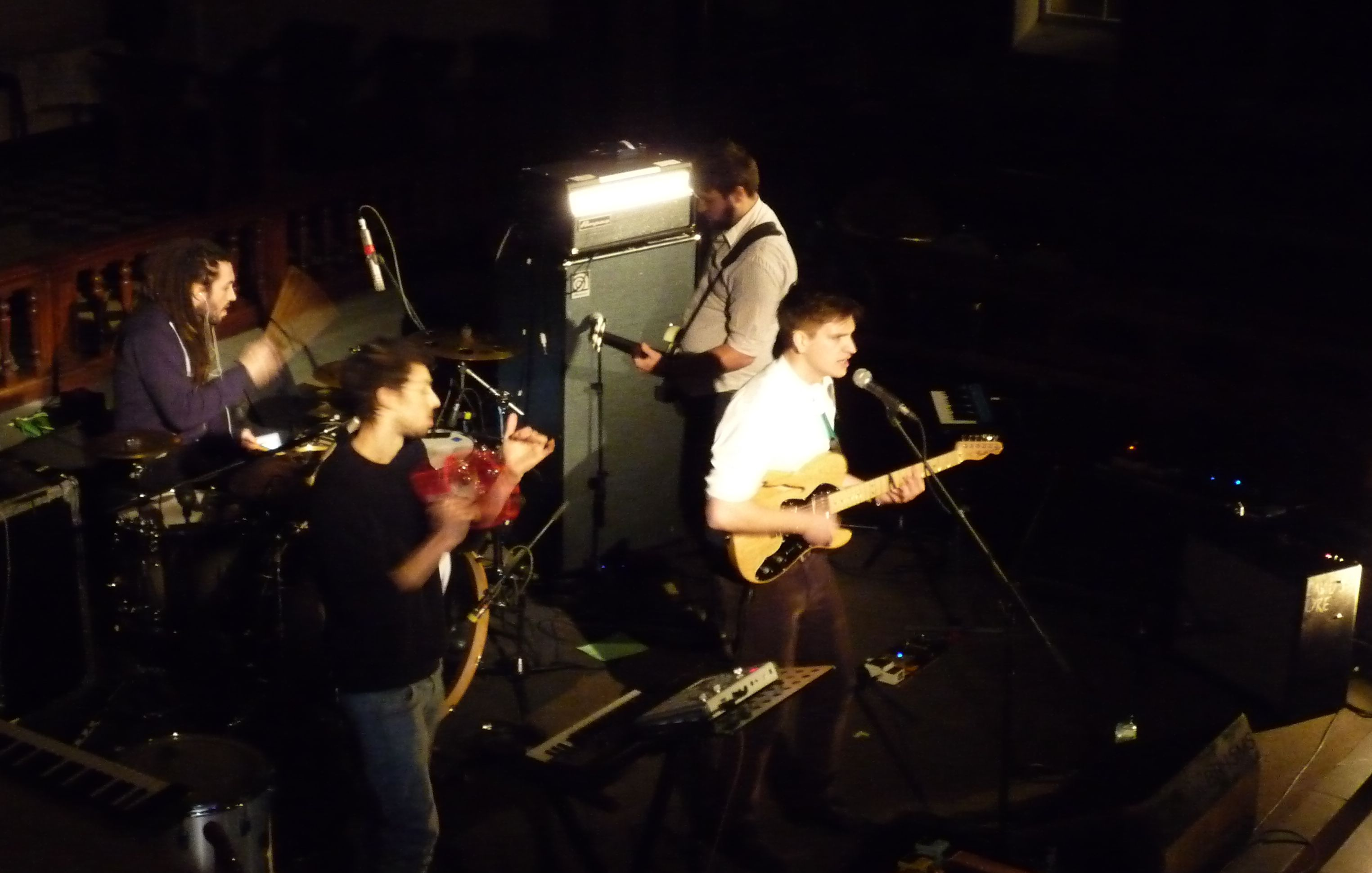
- Dixon in 2015

Background information
- Born: 8 August 1989 (age 37)
- Genres: Experimental, indie rock, indie pop, electronic
- Years active: 2010–present
- Website: www.thisisfyfe.com

Paul Dixon (born 8 August 1989 in London, England) is an English singer-songwriter and guitarist. He was known in the years 2010–2012 as David's Lyre, but is now using the musical project name Fyfe.

He picked the name David's Lyre during his university studies in Manchester, in reference to the musical skills of the biblical King David with the lyre.

He was featured by The Guardian as 'New band of the day' in 2010, by which time he had received attention for cover versions (of Ellie Goulding among others), remixes of other artists – notably, Marina and the Diamonds and Everything Everything – and had himself been remixed by producers The Last Skeptik and JaKwob.

His debut EP release in 2011, In Arms, was described as "promising" by BBC reviewer Mike Diver, and drew comparisons with Patrick Wolf for its blend of folk and electronic instruments. A music video was released for "In Arms", using a short film animation which fitted the song.

Dixon had signed a record contract with a major label in 2010, but the relationship ended in 2011, before releasing an album. Instead, his first full album Picture of Our Youth was self-released through Bandcamp in February 2012.

Dixon announced in January 2012 that Picture of Our Youth would be his last album issued under the project name David's Lyre.

Dixon now records and performs under the alias Fyfe. Having signed with Believe Recordings, Fyfe released his debut album Control on 9 March 2015. The album includes the singles, "For You", "Holding On" and "Solace", and followed the self-released four-song EP titled Solace EP released in April 2013.

As of 2016, Dixon was releasing music through his own label Benvolio Music.

The Space Between was released on 9 June 2017. It featured the single 'Belong', a collaboration with Kimbra.

A collaborative project with Iskra Strings, Extended Play, was released 17 November 2018.

He composed his first track for the BBC documentary Odd One Out which was released 12 September 2019. The documentary went on to win the award for Best Factual Entertainment Show at the National Television Awards.

He has also been writing and producing songs for other artists such as Alice On The Roof.

In 2024, Dixon co-wrote the song "The Tower", performed by Luna, which represented Poland at the Eurovision Song Contest 2024.

== Discography ==
=== Singles ===
- "Tear Them Down" (6 September 2010)
- "In Arms", remixed by Morgan Geist and The 2 Bears (Hideout, 20 June 2011)
- "Solace" (January 2013)
- "St Tropez" (February 2013)
- "Conversations" (June 2013)
- "For You" (July 2014)
- "Holding On" (October 2014)
- "Belong" (April 2017)

=== EPs ===
- In Arms (Mercury, 21 February 2011)
- Solace (8 April 2013)
- More Space Between (Benvolio, 2017)
- Extended Play (with Iskra Strings) (Benvolio, 17 November 2018)

=== Albums ===
- Picture of Our Youth (As "David's Lyre") (13 February 2012)
- Control (As "Fyfe") (9 March 2015)
- The Space Between (9 June 2017)
- Interiority (with "Iskra Strings") (3 June 2022)

=== Soundtracks ===
- Odd One Out (Music From The BBC Documentary) (Benvolio, 12 September 2019)
