= Leon Myszkowski =

Polish DJ (born 2000)

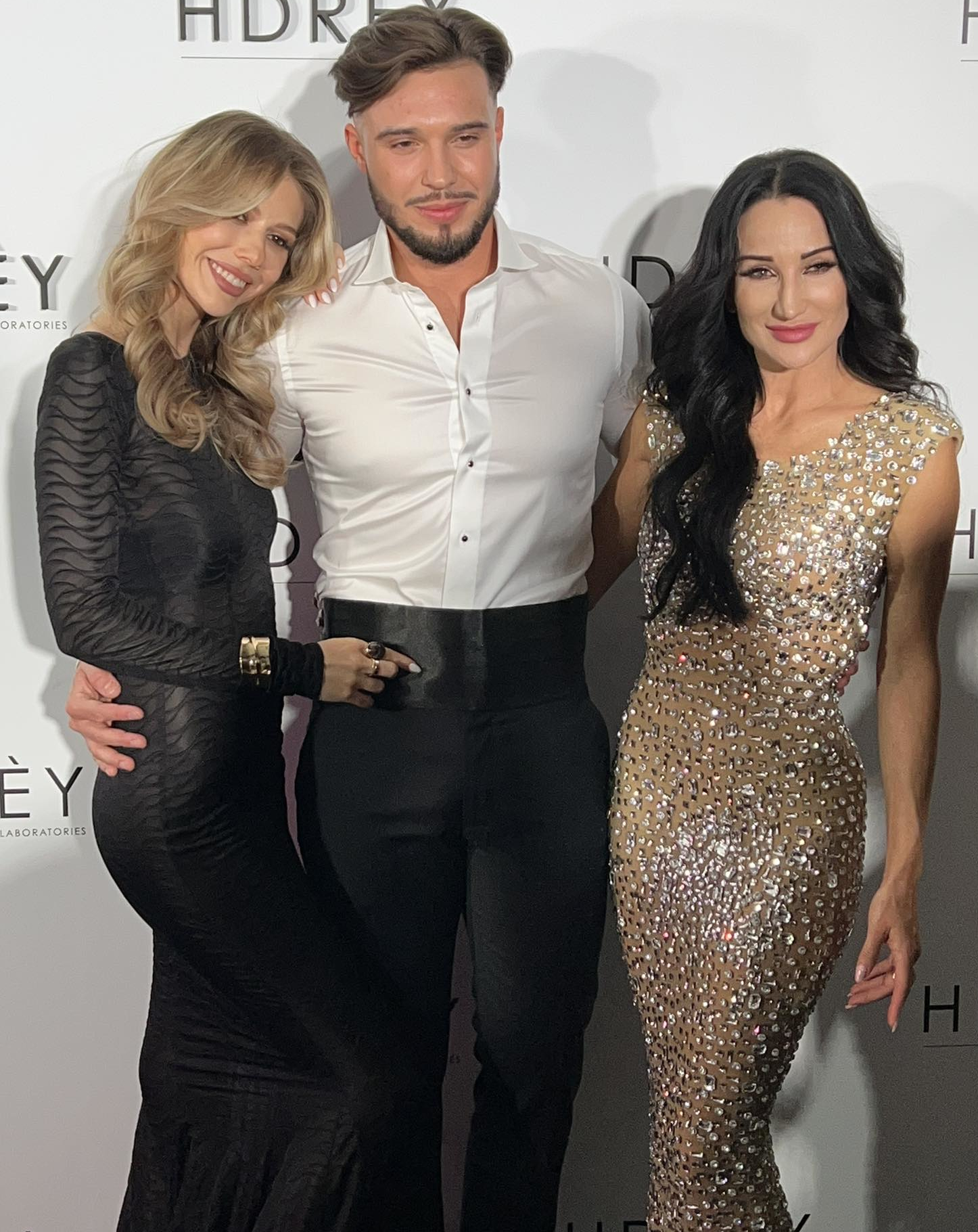
- Ksenia Ngo, his fiancée, Leon Myszkowski and his mother, Justyna Steczkowska
- Born: September 1, 2000 (age 26); Warsaw
- Occupations: disc jockey; music producer; entrepreneur

Leon Myszkowski (born September 1, 2000), is a Polish DJ, music producer and entrepreneur.

== Personal life ==
He is the son of singer Justyna Steczkowska and former model Maciej Myszkowski. He has two younger siblings: a sister, Helena, and a brother, Stanisław. On December 25, 2025, he proposed to Ksenia Ngo.

He completed the Film and Video Games Design Lyceum (part of the Warsaw Film School).

== Career ==
At age 14, he made his debut as a child model on the catwalk of a fashion show hosted by a prominent sports brand. He later ran a culinary blog on his website likeleo.pl for several years, which also included travel and fashion content. In 2016, he released a cookbook "Kuchnia Leona" (Leon’s Kitchen), interweaving recipes with personal anecdotes. He also made a guest appearance on Poland's version of Hell’s Kitchen.

He began his DJ career at age 15, performing at the occasional party and school disco. Together with Michał Harasimiuk, he formed the duo Mike & Laurent (formerly Døuble Løud3rs). In 2022, the pair recorded a single titled "Now" alongside Justyna Steczkowska. He has appeared in Polsat's Ninja Warrior Poland. He has collaborated on numerous concert and television projects and also manages his mother's career.

In the autumn of 2024, he took part in the third series of Nasi w mundurach on TTV.

In 2023, he and Łukasz Piwko co-founded WallFlow, a company that specializes in innovative wall printing technology.
