= Swada =

Polish record producer

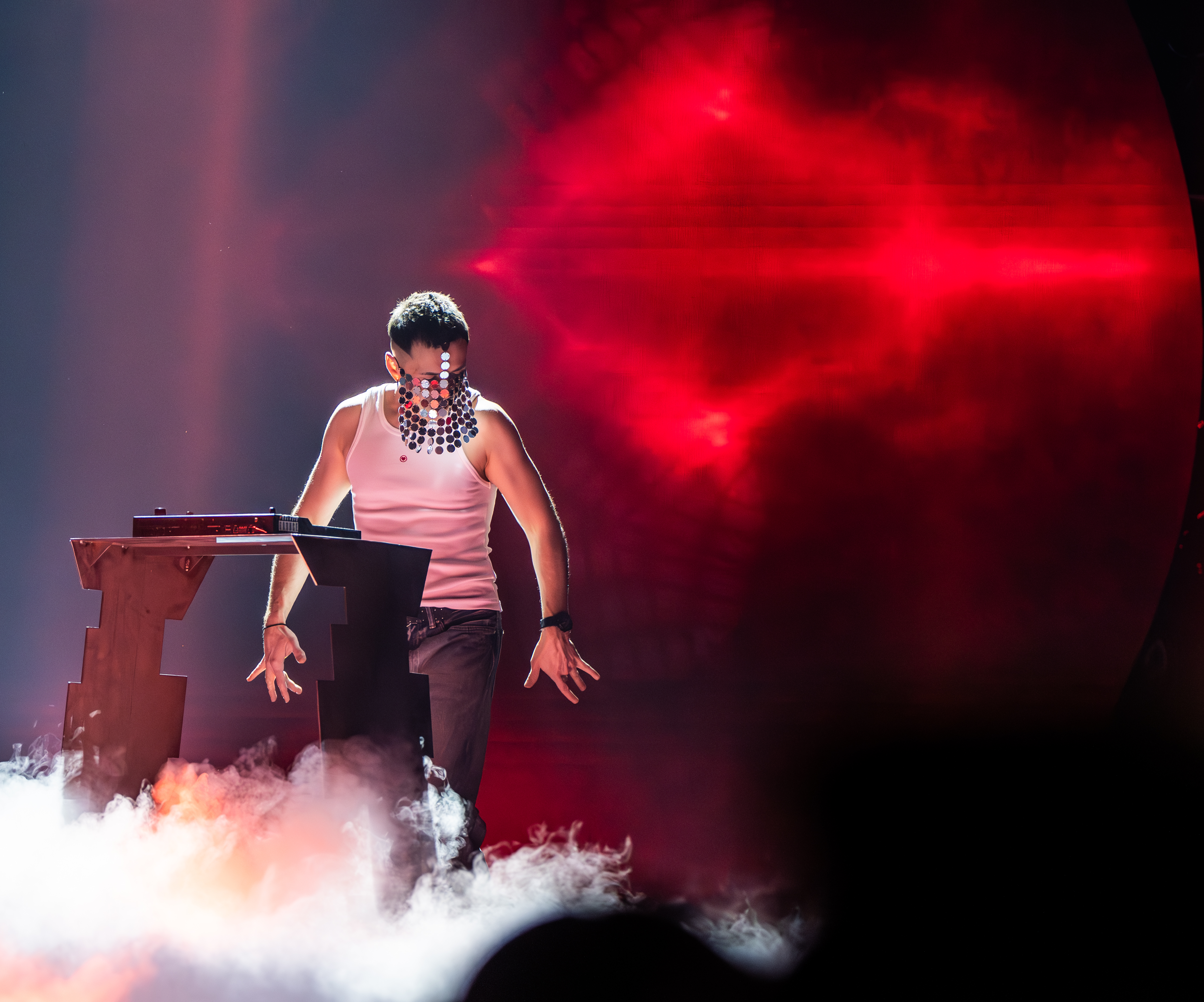
- Swada in February 2025

Background information
- Born: Wiktor Szczygieł
- Genres: Electronic; folk
- Occupation: Record producer

Wiktor Szczygieł, known professionally as Swada (stylised as Sw@da), is a Polish record producer, creating on samplers, synthesizers and sequencers, who records music from the border of electronics and folk, and describes his work as "Podlachian bounce".

== Career ==
Szczygieł described the Swada project as "an attempt to hear what would have happened if young people in Belarusian villages near Hajnówka had access to MPC samplers and TR-808 machines in 1989". He also emphasized that the essence of the project is "not only a compilation of folk inspirations from seemingly distant parts of the world, but also finding a plane for the functioning of traditional music as the core of underground-bass tracks".

In 2019, Swada created a music project with rappers Maciej "MC Dzidek" Dzitkowski and Nika "Niczos" Jurczuk and vocalist Wioletta Bociuk. In the same year, he received a distinction at the 22nd Polish Radio Folk Music Festival "Nowa Tradycja" for "a bold clash of distant musical and cultural phenomena". In 2021, together with Karolina Cicha, he created music for an exhibition prepared by the institution Xylopolis Center for Wood Art and Science, and for the studio album recorded together entitled Sad (2022), he received a nomination for the Fryderyk award in the category of roots music album of the year.

On 29 November 2024, Swada released an album entitled #InDaWoods, which he recorded with Nika "Niczos" Jurczuk. They promoted the album with the single "Lusterka", with which in January 2025 they were announced as finalists of Wielki finał polskich kwalifikacji, the Polish national final for the Eurovision Song Contest 2025, placing second in the final on 14 February 2025.

On 11 February 2025, the Ministry of Information of the Republic of Belarus labelled Szczygieł's Instagram account as "extremist" and disabled access to it in the country.

== Discography ==
=== Studio albums ===
Title	Details
Sad	Released: 14 October 2022; Formats: CD, Digital download, streaming
#InDaWoods	Released: 29 November 2024; Formats: Digital download, streaming
