= Alicja Szemplińska =

Polish singer

Alicja
- Szemplińska in 2026

Background information
- Born: Alicja Maria Szemplińska; 29 April 2002 (age 24); Ciechanów, Poland
- Genres: R&B, pop
- Occupation: Singer
- Years active: 2016–present
- Labels: Universal Music Polska (2019–2022); Island Records Polska (2022–2024); Fonobo (2024–present)

Alicja Maria Szemplińska (born 29 April 2002), known mononymously as Alicja, is a Polish singer-songwriter. She was set to represent Poland in the Eurovision Song Contest 2020 with "Empires" before the event's cancellation and represented Poland in the Eurovision Song Contest 2026 with "Pray".

== Early life and education ==
Alicja Szemplińska was born in Ciechanów to Izabela Nadratowska and Radosław Szempliński. She has a sister named Aleksandra. Her first musical experience was performing at a kindergarten assembly after being encouraged by her teacher. In her childhood, she attended vocal classes at the Maria Konopnicka Powiat Centre of Culture and Arts in Ciechanów and sang in a church choir. At the age of 12, she began taking singing lessons. She later attended the 1st Zygmunt Krasiński General Education Liceum in Ciechanów, where she completed her matura in 2021.

== Career ==
In 2016, she won the Polish junior singing talent show Hit, Hit, Hurra!, earning the right to take part in a vocal workshop with Seth Riggs in Los Angeles.

She won season 10 of The Voice of Poland in 2019.

=== Eurovision Song Contest ===
==== 2020 ====
The following year, she won Poland's national Eurovision selection competition Szansa na sukces with her song "Empires", which she would have performed at the second semi-final of the Eurovision Song Contest 2020 in Rotterdam on 14 May 2020. On 18 March 2020, the contest was cancelled due to the COVID-19 pandemic. Although Alicja expressed her desire to represent Poland in the Eurovision Song Contest 2021, she was ultimately not chosen to represent Poland again and Rafał Brzozowski was chosen instead. Alicja instead performed "Empires" during the interval act of the Junior Eurovision Song Contest 2020 held in Warsaw, with co-presenter of the event, Ida Nowakowska performing as a backup dancer.

==== 2023 ====
In early 2023, she returned to Poland's national final for the first time since her 2020 win, with her newly released song "New Home", a song she wrote herself along with Farrah Guenena and Chloe Martini. The song placed 6th in the final with a total of 10 points.

==== 2026 ====
She was later chosen to represent Poland in the Eurovision Song Contest 2026, after once again winning Poland's national final with the song "Pray". She placed 2nd in her semifinal and 12th in the grand final, earning 150 points.

== Personal life ==
As of 2026, she in a relationship with Polish rapper Hodak, with whom she has recorded multiple songs since 2021.

== Discography ==
=== Studio albums ===
- Nie wracam (2024)

=== Singles ===
- "Prawie my" (2019)
- "Empires" (2020)
- "Gdzieś" (2020)
- "Pusto" (2020)
- "Kolęda dla nieobecnych" (2020)
- "Na pamięć" (2020)
- "Growing Up" (with Fiedlerski and Remme) (2021)
- "Ej, stop!" (2021)
- "Spójrz" (2021)
- "IDK" (2022)
- "Movin' On" (2022)
- "W moim garażu" (2022)
- "Sekret" (2022)
- "Stick Together" (2022)
- "New Home" (2023)
- "Ostatni dzień lata" (2023)
- "Stój" (2023)
- "Zaczekam" (2023)
- "Spokojnie Panowie" (2024)
- "Nie wracam" (2024)
- "Za dużo łez" (2024)
- "W co ty dziś grasz?" (2024)
- "Pray" (2026)
- "She's Back" (2026)

Awards and achievements
Preceded by Marcin Sójka	The Voice of Poland winner 2019	Succeeded by Krystian Ochman
Preceded by Tulia with "Fire of Love (Pali się)"	Poland in the Eurovision Song Contest; 2020 (cancelled)	Succeeded by Rafał with "The Ride"
Preceded by Justyna Steczkowska with "Gaja"	Poland in the Eurovision Song Contest; 2026	Succeeded by TBD
