= Poland in the Eurovision Song Contest 2020 =

- Eurovision Song Contest 2020
- Participating broadcaster: Telewizja Polska (TVP)
- Country: Poland
- Selection process: Szansa na sukces – Eurowizja 2020
- Selection date: 23 February 2020

Competing entry
- Song: "Empires"
- Artist: Alicja
- Songwriters: Patryk Kumór; Dominic Buczkowski-Wojtaszek; Laurell Barker; Frazer Mac

Placement
- Final result: Contest cancelled

Participation chronology

Poland was set to be represented at the Eurovision Song Contest 2020 with the song "Empires" written by Dominik Buczkowski-Wojtaszek, Patryk Kumór, Laurell Barker and Frazer Mac. The song was performed by Alicja Szemplińska. The Polish broadcaster Telewizja Polska (TVP) organised the national final Szansa na Sukces – Eurowizja 2020 in order to select the Polish entry for the 2020 contest in Rotterdam, Netherlands. The national final consisted of three semi-finals featured seven contestants each on 2, 9 and 16 February 2020, respectively, and a final on 23 February 2020 featuring the three qualifying contestants. "Empires" performed by Alicja Szemplińska was selected as the winner after gaining the most points following the combination of votes from a six-member jury panel and a public vote.

Poland was drawn to compete in the second semi-final of the Eurovision Song Contest which took place on 14 May 2020. However, the contest was cancelled due to the COVID-19 pandemic.

== Background ==
Prior to the 2020 contest, Poland had participated in the Eurovision Song Contest twenty-two times since its first entry in 1994. Poland's highest placement in the contest, to this point, has been second place, which the nation achieved with its debut entry in 1994 with the song "To nie ja!" performed by Edyta Górniak. Poland has only, thus far, reached the top ten on two other occasions, when Ich Troje performing the song "Keine Grenzen – Żadnych granic" finished seventh in 2003, and when Michał Szpak performing the song "Color of Your Life" finished eighth in 2016. Between 2005 and 2011, Poland failed to qualify from the semi-final round six out of seven years with only their 2008 entry, "For Life" performed by Isis Gee, managing to take the nation to the final during that period. After once again failing to qualify to the final in 2011, the country withdrew from the contest during 2012 and 2013. Since returning to the contest in 2014, Poland managed to qualify to the final each year before failing to qualify to the final in 2018 and 2019, the latter with their entry "Fire of Love (Pali się)" performed by Tulia.

The Polish national broadcaster, Telewizja Polska (TVP), broadcasts the event within Poland and organises the selection process for the nation's entry. TVP confirmed Poland's participation in the 2020 Eurovision Song Contest on 1 October 2019. Between 2016 and 2018, TVP organised televised national finals that featured a competition among several artists and songs in order to select the Polish entry for the Eurovision Song Contest. The broadcaster opted to internally select the 2019 entry, however, on 2 January 2020, TVP announced that the Polish entry for the 2020 Eurovision Song Contest would be selected via a national final and would take place during the talent show Szansa na sukces.

== Before Eurovision ==
=== Szansa na sukces – Eurowizja 2020 ===
Szansa na sukces – Eurowizja 2020 (transl. A Chance for Success – Eurovision 2020) was the national final organised by TVP in order to select the Polish entry for the Eurovision Song Contest 2020. The competition consisted of four shows which concluded with a winning artist and song on 23 February 2020. All shows was broadcast on TVP2 as well as streamed online at the broadcaster's website tvp.pl. The national final was watched by an average of 1.9 million viewers in Poland with a peak of 2.3 million viewers for the first semi-final.

==== Format ====
The format of the national final consisted of four shows: three pre-recorded semi-finals with seven contestants each on 2, 9 and 16 February 2020, respectively, and a final broadcast live on 23 February 2020. In each semi-final, the contestant performed cover versions of songs that relate to the theme of the show and a three-member professional jury consisting of Cleo (2014 Polish Eurovision entrant), Michał Szpak (2016 Polish Eurovision entrant) and Gromee (2018 Polish Eurovision entrant) selected one contestant to qualify for the final from each semi-final. TVP also reserved the right to select a wildcard for the final out of the remaining non-qualifying contestants, but ultimately decided that a wildcard would be unnecessary. The final featured the remaining three contestants performing their candidate Eurovision songs in contention to represent Poland in addition to cover versions of former winning Eurovision songs. The winner was selected via the 50/50 combination of votes from a six-member professional jury and a public vote.

==== Competing entries ====
TVP opened a submission period for interested artists and songwriters to submit their entries between 2 January 2020 and 13 January 2020. Only Polish artists were eligible to compete. From all submissions received at the closing of the deadline, a selection committee selected twenty-one entries from the received submissions to compete in the national final. The selected competing artists were announced on 19 January 2020. Among the competing artists was Albert Černý, who represented Czech Republic in the Eurovision Song Contest in 2019 as member of the band Lake Malawi.

==== Semi-final 1 ====
The first semi-final was filmed on 19 January 2020 and aired on 2 February 2020. The seven contestants performed cover versions of songs from ABBA's discography and Kasia Dereń was selected by a three-member professional jury to qualify for the final, with Patryk Skoczyński receiving an honourable mention.

Semi-final 1 – 2 February 2020
| R/O | Artist | Song | Result |
|---|---|---|---|
| 1 | Patryk Skoczyński | "Gimme! Gimme! Gimme! (A Man After Midnight)" | Honourable mention |
| 2 | Emilia Sanecka | "Waterloo" | Eliminated |
| 3 | Julia and Wiktoria Szlachta | "Dancing Queen" | Eliminated |
| 4 | Kasia Dereń | "Mamma Mia" | Advanced |
| 5 | Amelia Andryszczyk | "SOS" | Eliminated |
| 6 | Sargis Davtyan | "Voulez-Vous" | Eliminated |
| 7 | Maja Hyży | "Knowing Me, Knowing You" | Eliminated |

==== Semi-final 2 ====
The second semi-final was filmed on 20 January 2020 and aired on 9 February 2020. The seven contestants performed cover versions of former Eurovision songs and Alicja Szemplińska was selected by a three-member professional jury to qualify for the final, with Paulina Czapla and Weronika Curyło receiving honourable mentions.

Semi-final 2 – 9 February 2020
| R/O | Artist | Song (Original artists) | Result |
|---|---|---|---|
| 1 | Damian Kulej | "Heroes" (Måns Zelmerlöw) | Eliminated |
| 2 | Paulina Czapla | "Amar pelos dois" (Salvador Sobral) | Honourable mention |
| 3 | Weronika Curyło | "Dschinghis Khan" (Dschinghis Khan) | Honourable mention |
| 4 | Stashka | "If I Were Sorry" (Frans) | Eliminated |
| 5 | Saszan | "Congratulations" (Cliff Richard) | Eliminated |
| 6 | Alicja Szemplińska | "To nie ja!" (Edyta Górniak) | Advanced |
| 7 | Aleksandra Nykiel | "Save Your Kisses for Me" (Brotherhood of Man) | Eliminated |

==== Semi-final 3 ====
The third semi-final was filmed on 20 January 2020 and aired on 16 February 2020. The seven contestants performed cover versions of songs from The Beatles's discography and Albert Černý was selected by a three-member professional jury to qualify for the final, with Nick Sinckler and Basia Gąsienica Giewont receiving honourable mentions.

Semi-final 3 – 16 February 2020
| R/O | Artist | Song | Result |
|---|---|---|---|
| 1 | Marek Kaliszuk | "Help!" | Eliminated |
| 2 | Nick Sinckler | "Can't Buy Me Love" | Honourable mention |
| 3 | Basia Gąsienica Giewont | "Love Me Do" | Honourable mention |
| 4 | Albert Černý | "Please Please Me" | Advanced |
| 5 | Norbert Legieć | "She Loves You" | Eliminated |
| 6 | Marzena Ryt | "Twist and Shout" | Eliminated |
| 7 | Adrian Makar | "A Hard Day's Night" | Eliminated |

===== Final =====
The final took place live on 23 February 2020 where the three contestants that qualified from the preceding three semi-finals competed. In the first part of the show the finalists performed cover versions of former winning Eurovision songs: Kasia Dereń performed "Satellite", Alicja Szemplińska performed "Euphoria", and Albert Černý performed "Fairytale". In the second part the candidate Eurovision songs entered by the finalists were performed and the winner, "Empires" performed by Alicja Szemplińska, was determined by a 50/50 combination of votes from a six-member professional jury and a public vote. The jury consisted of Cleo (2014 Polish Eurovision entrant), Michał Szpak (2016 Polish Eurovision entrant), Gromee (2018 Polish Eurovision entrant), Anna Cyzowska (director of the TVP Entertainment Agency), Konrad Smuga (director of Polish performances at the Eurovision and Junior Eurovision) and Grzegorz Urban (music director of Szansa na sukces).

Final – 23 February 2020
| R/O | Artist | Song | Songwriter(s) | Jury | Televote | Total | Place |
|---|---|---|---|---|---|---|---|
| 1 | Albert Černý and Lake Malawi | "Lucy" | Alasdair Bouch, Albert Černý, Cesár Sampson, Joakim With Steen, Lasse Piirainen | 3 | 3 | 6 | 2 |
| 2 | Alicja Szemplińska | "Empires" | Dominik Buczkowski-Wojtaszek, Patryk Kumór, Laurell Barker, Frazer Mac | 5 | 5 | 10 | 1 |
| 3 | Kasia Dereń | "Count On Me" | Mateusz Krautwurst, Marcin Januszkiewicz, Kasia Dereń, Piotr Walicki | 1 | 1 | 2 | 3 |

== At Eurovision ==
According to Eurovision rules, all nations with the exceptions of the host country and the "Big Five" (France, Germany, Italy, Spain and the United Kingdom) are required to qualify from one of two semi-finals in order to compete for the final; the top ten countries from each semi-final progress to the final. The European Broadcasting Union (EBU) split up the competing countries into six different pots based on voting patterns from previous contests, with countries with favourable voting histories put into the same pot. On 28 January 2020, a special allocation draw was held which placed each country into one of the two semi-finals, as well as which half of the show they would perform in. Poland was placed into the second semi-final, to be held on 14 May 2020, and was scheduled to perform in the first half of the show. However, due to 2019-20 pandemic of Coronavirus, the contest was cancelled.

During the Eurovision Song Celebration YouTube broadcast in place of the semi-finals, it was revealed that Poland was set to perform in position 8, following the entry from Serbia and before the entry from Iceland.
