= Empires (Alicja Szemplińska song) =

2020 song by Alicja Szemplińska

Single by Alicja Szemplińska
- Released: 23 February 2020
- Length: 3:06
- Label: Universal Music Polska
- Songwriters: Patryk Kumór; Dominic Buczkowski-Wojtaszek; Laurell Barker; Frazer Mac

Alicja Szemplińska singles chronology
"Prawie my" (2019)	"Empires" (2020)	"Gdzieś" (2020)

Eurovision Song Contest 2020 entry
- Country: Poland
- Artist: Alicja Szemplińska
- Language: English
- Composers: Patryk Kumór; Dominic Buczkowski-Wojtaszek; Laurell Barker; Frazer Mac
- Lyricists: Patryk Kumór; Dominic Buczkowski-Wojtaszek; Laurell Barker; Frazer Mac

Finals performance
- Semi-final result: Contest cancelled

Entry chronology
- ◄ "Pali się" (2019)
- "The Ride" (2021) ►

"Empires" is a song by Polish singer Alicja Szemplińska. It was selected to be the entrant for Poland in the Eurovision Song Contest 2020 on 23 February 2020. Szemplińska would have performed the song at the second semi-final of the Eurovision Song Contest 2020 in Rotterdam, the Netherlands on 14 May 2020, if not for the cancelation of Eurovision 2020.

== Background ==
The song was composed by Patryk Kumór, Dominic Buczkowski-Wojtaszek, Frazer Mac and Laurell Barker as 17-year-old Szemplińska's original song to perform during Poland's national selection for Eurovision, Szansa na sukces, which Szemplińska subsequently won.

On February 23, 2020, the song was premiered to TVP2 viewers during the Polish Eurovision preselection held in the format of a special edition of Szansa na sukces. Eurovision 2020. The composition competed with the songs "Lucy" by Lake Malawi (which was performed during the selection by the band's vocalist Albert Černý) and "Count On Me" (the English-language version of the single "Ufaj mi") by Kasia Dereń.

Scoring a maximum of 10 points (5 points from viewers and 5 from the jury), the song won the selections and was to represent Poland at the 65th Eurovision Song Contest in Rotterdam, but on March 18 it was reported that the contest had been canceled due to the coronavirus pandemic.

== Eurovision Song Contest ==
The song was to represent Poland in the Eurovision Song Contest 2020. On 28 January 2020, Poland was placed into the second semi-final, which would have been held on 14 May 2020. Szemplińska was scheduled to perform in the first half of the show.
