= Dziewczyna Szamana =

Studio album by Justyna Steczkowska
- Released: March 18, 1996
- Genre: Jazz pop
- Length: 46:33
- Label: Pomaton EMI
- Producer: Grzegorz Ciechowski

Justyna Steczkowska chronology
Dziewczyna Szamana (1996)	Naga (1997)

Singles from Dziewczyna Szamana
- 1. "Dziewczyna Szamana" Released: 1995; 2. "Grawitacja" Released: 1996; 3. "Oko za oko, słowo za słowo" Released: 1996; 4. "Niekochani" Released: 1996

Dziewczyna Szamana (lit. 'Shaman's Girl') is the debut studio album by Polish singer Justyna Steczkowska which was released in Poland on March 18, 1996, by Pomaton EMI. In 2021, it was remastered and released on vinyl for a 25th anniversary edition by Warner Music Group.

The album was certified Platinum. It was produced by Grzegorz Ciechowski, a frontman and a founder of the band Republika who worked on Dziewczyna Szamana with Steczkowska under a female pseudonym Ewa Omernik.

The tracklist featured Karuzela z madonnami, a cover of the song by Ewa Demarczyk, and Boskie Buenos (Buenos Aires), a cover of the song by Maanam with which Steczkowska had made a breakthrough on the music talent show Szansa na sukces.

Dziewczyna Szamana is primarily an alternative pop record with elements of trip hop and acid jazz.

== Track listing ==
1. Dziewczyna Szamana (composed by Justyna Steczkowska and Paweł Fortuna, lyrics by Ewa Omernik)
2. Czy to mi... (composed by Justyna Steczkowska, lyrics by Ewa Omernik)
3. Tatuuj mnie (composed by Justyna Steczkowska and Paweł Fortuna, lyrics by Ewa Omernik)
4. Niekochani (composed by Justyna Steczkowska and Grzegorz Ciechowski, lyrics by Ewa Omernik)
5. Oko za oko, słowo za słowo (composed by Justyna Steczkowska, lyrics by Ewa Omernik)
6. Myte dusze (composed by Justyna Steczkowska and Grzegorz Ciechowski, lyrics by Ewa Omernik)
7. Grawitacja (composed by Justyna Steczkowska and Paweł Fortuna, lyrics by Ewa Omernik)
8. Boskie Buenos (Buenos Aires) (composed by Marek Jackowski, lyrics by Olga Jackowska)
9. Wrogu mój (composed by Justyna Steczkowska and Paweł Fortuna, lyrics by Ewa Omernik)
10. Ukołysze nas sitowie (composed by Justyna Steczkowska)
11. W Kazimierzu Dolnym (composed by Grzegorz Ciechowski, lyrics by Ewa Omernik)
12. Karuzela z Madonnami (composed by Zygmunt Konieczny, lyrics by Miron Białoszewski)
13. Dziewczyna Szamana (demo) (composed by Justyna Steczkowska and Paweł Fortuna, lyrics by Ewa Omernik)

=== Limited edition bonus tracks ===
1. Dziewczyna Szamana (Afro Dance Mix)
2. Moja intymność (composed by Mateusz Pospieszalski, lyrics by Wojciech Waglewski, production by Wojciech Waglewski)
