= Nocne zmory =

Studio album by Luna
- Released: 22 April 2022
- Length: 42:25
- Label: Polydor; Universal Music
- Producer: Hotel Torino; Jan Bielecki

Luna chronology
Caught in the Night (2021)	Nocne zmory (2022)	No Rest (2025)

Singles from Nocne Zmory
- 1. "Zgaś" Released: 25 November 2020; 2. "Mniej" Released: 2 February 2021; 3. "Wirtualne Przedmieście" Released: 20 May 2021; 4. "Zabierz Mnie" Released: 12 August 2021; 5. "Niewypowiedziane" Released: 28 October 2021; 6. "Wystarczy" Released: 3 February 2022; 7. "Elon Musk (w Ogniu Się Unoszę)" Released: 3 March 2022; 8. "Nie Budź Mnie" Released: 1 April 2022; 9. "Nocne Zmory" Released: 20 April 2022

Nocne zmory (Nightmares) is the debut studio album by Polish singer Luna, released on 1 April 2022 by Polydor Poland. "Zgaś" was released as the lead single from Nocne zmory on 25 November 2020. It peaked at No. 14 in the Polish top albums chart.

== About ==
Luna's album debut is her emotional portrait, an attempt to capture her feelings, complicated emotions, and, above all, the complexity of fear. The title track of the album - "Nocne zmory" - was the fourth composition that the artist prepared for her album. – I knew right away that this song would be the leitmotif of the entire album. "Nightmares" was such a broad term for me, so symbolic and emotional, that it encompassed all my fears, says Luna. She emphasizes that "night terrors" are not only fears but also unfulfilled dreams, too high expectations, inappropriate desires and ambitions, love disappointments, and unrealities that we create ourselves and cannot get rid of. – Night terrors are not visible at first glance, because they lie deep inside us.

Luna says that "Nocne zmory" is a forest song. – When I was writing it, an image of a cold and wet forest that pierces us from the inside came to my mind – says the artist. The song is accompanied by a minimalist, but refined in every detail, a video in which the main role is played by bodies spinning in dance. – The music video is organic and has a pure form because I didn't want to add any meaning to this story. Therefore, everyone can interpret it in their way. There is no single key here. The clip is sensual, close to the body, and in bright colors - adds Luna.

According to Luna, she wrote this album about her fears:

It was while writing the description of the album that I realized that the material on the album was very personal and filled with me. On the other hand, when writing the songs, I did not talk about myself, but rather about my emotional states - fears. Night terrors are subcutaneous, unconscious fears. There are no events from my life here, no "heartbroken" experiences. The creative process was interesting for me because, contrary to appearances, it was not self-therapy. I created a completely different world. My stories are dictated by my imagination, my dreams, and not reality - how I am every day. That's why working on the album was so fascinating. It didn't make me tired, it didn't exhaust me emotionally. It's all because of this element of creation, not talking about my life, about myself.

== Track listing ==
All the songs are written by Luna and Hotel Torino (Dominic Buczkowski-Wojtaszek and Patryk Kumór), otherwise stated.

No.	Title	Writer(s)	Length
1.	"Blade (intro)"	Luna, Hotel Torino, Boleslaw Lesmian	1:18
2.	"Mniej"		3:11
3.	"Czerwień Moich Ust"		2:53
4.	"Zgaś"		3:09
5.	"Marznę"		3:12
6.	"Niewypowiedziane"		2:43
7.	"Wirtualne Przedmiescie"		2:42
8.	"Nie Budź Mnie"		3:05
9.	"Długo Zasypiam"		3:24
10.	"Zabierz Mnie"	Luna, Hotel Torino, Thomas Leithead-Docherty	2:53
11.	"Elon Musk (W Ogniu Się Unoszę)"		3:33
12.	"Chimera"		2:45
13.	"Wystarczy"	Michał Szczygieł, Hotel Torino, Jan Bielecki, Saszan	2:43
14.	"Nocne Zmory"		3:22
15.	"Śmiercie (outro)"	Luna, Hotel Torino, Boleslaw Lesmian	1:28
Total length:			42:25

== Personnel ==
- Aleksandra Katarzyna "Ola" Wielgomas (Luna) – vocals, composer (tracks 1–15)
- Dominic Buczkowski-Wojtaszek – producer, composer (tracks 1–15)
- Patryk Kumór – producer, composer (tracks 1–15)
- Jan Bielecki – producer (track 13), composer (track 13)
- Boleslaw Lesmian – composer (tracks 1 & 15)
- Michał Szczygieł – composer (track 13)
- Saszan – composer (track 13)
- Thomas Leithead-Dochery – composer (track 10)

== Charts ==
Chart performance for Caught in the Night
Chart (2022)	Peak position
Polish Albums (ZPAV)	14
