= Poland in the Eurovision Song Contest 2024 =

- Eurovision Song Contest 2024
- Participating broadcaster: Telewizja Polska (TVP)
- Country: Poland
- Selection process: Internal selection
- Announcement date: 19 February 2024

Competing entry
- Song: "The Tower"
- Artist: Luna
- Songwriters: Aleksandra Katarzyna Wielgomas; Max Cooke; Paul Dixon

Placement
- Semi-final result: Failed to qualify (12th)

Participation chronology

Poland was represented at the Eurovision Song Contest 2024 with the song "The Tower", written by Aleksandra Katarzyna Wielgomas, Max Cooke, and Paul Dixon, and performed by Wielgomas herself under her stage name Luna. The Polish participating broadcaster, Telewizja Polska (TVP), internally selected its entry for the contest.

Poland was drawn to compete in the first semi-final of the Eurovision Song Contest which took place on 7 May 2024. Performing during the show in position 6, "The Tower" was not announced among the top 10 entries of the first semi-final and therefore did not qualify to compete in the final. It was later revealed that Poland placed twelfth out of the 15 participating countries in the semi-final with 35 points.

== Background ==
Prior to the 2024 contest, Telewizja Polska (TVP) had participated in the Eurovision Song Contest representing Poland twenty-five times since its first entry in 1994. Its highest placement in the contest, to this point, had been second place, achieved with its debut entry in 1994, "To nie ja!" performed by Edyta Górniak. It had only reached the top ten on two other occasions, when "Keine Grenzen – Żadnych granic" performed Ich Troje finished seventh in 2003, and when "Color of Your Life" performed by Michał Szpak finished eighth in 2016. Between 2005 and 2011 (except in 2008), and again between 2018 and 2021, it failed to qualify from the semi-final; additionally, TVP was absent from the contest in 2012 and 2013. Between 2014 and 2017, it managed instead to qualify to the final each year. In 2023, "Solo" performed by Blanka qualified to the final, eventually finishing 19th.

As part of its duties as participating broadcaster, TVP organises the selection of its entry in the Eurovision Song Contest and broadcasts the event in the country. In 2022 and 2023, the broadcaster selected its entry for the contest through a national final show titled Tu bije serce Europy! Wybieramy hit na Eurowizję!. TVP confirmed its intention to take part in the 2024 contest on 20 September 2023.

== Before Eurovision ==
=== Internal selection ===
In October 2023, claims surfaced that TVP was reverting to an internal selection following the controversy surrounding the 2023 national final. On 9 January 2024, the broadcaster confirmed that the Polish entry for the Eurovision Song Contest 2024 would be selected internally, and opened a submission period for interested artists lasting until 2 February. Applicants were required to hold Polish citizenship for their entries to qualify to compete. TVP received 212 submissions at the closing of the deadline, including entries from Edyta Górniak and Justyna Steczkowska, who represented Poland in the Eurovision Song Contest in 1994 and 1995 respectively.

A five-member selection committee each awarded scores from 1 to 10 to ten of the received submissions, with the one receiving the highest score being selected as the Polish entry for the contest by 13 February 2024. The selection committee consisted of: Łukasz Pieter (Radio ZET), Michał Hanczak (Radio Eska), Kasia Moś (2017 Polish Eurovision entrant), Konrad Szczęsny (President of OGAE Poland) and Piotr Klatt (music journalist, deputy director of the TVP Entertainment Creation and Fixture Agency). Luna with the song "The Tower" was announced as the Polish entrant on 19 February 2024 during the morning show Pytanie na śniadanie on TVP2. TVP subsequently released the list of songs that received points from the selection committee.

Top 23 entries ranked by the selection jury
Artist	Song	Songwriter(s)
Bryska	"Obca"	Gabriela Nowak-Skyrpan; Karol Serek; Paweł Wawrzeńczyk
Edyta Górniak	"I Remember"	Chris Aiken; Luiza Ganczarska; Edyta Górniak
Izabela Zabielska	"Nowhere to Go"	Izabela Zabielska; Michał Głomski
Izdeb	"Duch"	Lilibet; Małgosia Latoszek; Paweł Izdebski
Happy Prince	"Insatiable"	Unknown
Justyna Steczkowska	"Witch-er Tarohoro"	Carla Fernandes; Dominic Buczkowski-Wojtaszek; Emilian Waluchowski; Justyna Steczkowska; Maria Dzięcielak; Patryk Kumór
Karolina Wilgus	"Kwiatuszek"	Karolina Wilgus
L.U.C., Kayah, Dagadana and RBFO	"Jesień – tańcuj"	Dorota Murzynowska; Katarzyna Rooijens; Lukasz Rostkowski; Maciej Filipczuk; Marcin Żytomirski; Michał Maziarz; Michał Żak; Szczepan Pospieszalski
Koko Die	"If I Could"	Radosław Baranowski; Koko Die
Krystian Embradora	"Rebel"	Aleksandra Lewandowska; Wojciech Stekla
Krystyna Prońko	"Tempus Fugit"	Mieczysław Jurecki; Stanisław Głowacz
Kuba i Kuba	"Światło"	Jakub Frankowski; Jakub Mieczaj
Luna	"The Tower"	Aleksandra Katarzyna Wielgomas; Max Cooke; Paul Dixon
Maciej Musiałowski	"Daj mi jakiś znak"	Krzysztof Falkowski; Maciej Musiałowski; Patryk Kraśniewski; Wojtek Urbański
Marcin Maciejczak	"Midnight Dreamer"	Alice Fernandes; Gabriel Faria; Marcin Maciejczak; Maria Veiga; Michał Majak
My Friend Casino	"Enslave"	Błażej Mroczek; Mateusz Wicher; Paweł Glosz; Paweł Pyś
Natasza	"Who We Are"	Adrian Woronowicz; Jeremi Sikorski; Kevin Mglej
Nita	"Thunder"	Anita Dudczak; Anna Leonowicz; Arek Kopera; Edward Leithead-Dochert; Tom Martin
Pan Savyan	"W kolorku amaretto"	Dzmitry Sauyanenka
Paulina Wróblewska	"Dni"	Paulina Wróblewska
Piotr Odoszewski	"Dzień noc"	Leon Krześniak; Piotr Odoszewski; Stanisław Szulga
Sargis Davtyan	"Balcony of Our Love"	Sargis Davtyan
Sasi and Blascello	"Karma"	Ewa Onacewicz; Mikołaj Błaszczyk

Detailed voting results
Artist	Song	K. Moś	K. Szczęsny	Ł. Pieter	M. Hanczak	P. Klatt	Points	Place
Luna	"The Tower"		5	10	9	10	34	1
Justyna Steczkowska	"Witch-er Tarohoro"	4	10	9	10		33	2
L.U.C., Kayah, Dagadana and RBFO	"Jesień – tańcuj"	7	3	6	6	1	23	3
Marcin Maciejczak	"Midnight Dreamer"		9	3	7	4	23	3
Natasza	"Who We Are"	2	8	7	5		22	5
Nita	"Thunder"		1	8	8	2	19	6
Bryska	"Obca"			2	2	9	13	7
Sasi and Blascello	"Karma"		7		4		11	8
Maciej Musiałowski	"Daj mi jakiś znak"	10					10	9
Karolina Wilgus	"Kwiatuszek"	9					9	10
Happy Prince	"Insatiable"	8					8	11
Izabela Zabielska	"Nowhere to Go"				1	7	8	11
Izdeb	"Duch"	3		5			8	11
Krystyna Prońko	"Tempus Fugit"		2			6	8	11
My Friend Casino	"Enslave"					8	8	11
Krystian Embradora	"Rebel"		6				6	16
Paulina Wróblewska	"Dni"	6					6	16
Edyta Górniak	"I Remember"					5	5	18
Koko Die	"If I Could"	5					5	18
Pan Savyan	"W kolorku amaretto"		4	1			5	18
Kuba i Kuba	"Światło"	1				3	4	21
Piotr Odoszewski	"Dzień noc"			4			4	21
Sargis Davtyan	"Balcony of Our Love"				3		3	23

==== Controversy ====
Following the announcement of Luna as the Polish entrant, Wirtualna Polska reported that one of the selection committee members had disclosed to them that "Jesień – tańcuj" performed by L.U.C., Kayah, Dagadana and RBFO was originally selected as the Polish entry, but the verdict was rejected by TVP due to "legal and organisational issues"; following this, a revote was reportedly held, won by Luna, who had placed second in the original vote. Among the issues reported were fears that, if selected, "Jesień – tańcuj" could be rejected by the EBU on the basis of it not being original as it contains quotes from the early 20th century novel The Peasants, and that it would have to be performed in a "stripped-down version" at the contest as it is originally made to be performed by more than six people, exceeding the EBU limit. TVP never officially commented on the matter.

The result provided by TVP was also found not to match the regulations of the internal selection, in which it was specified that each song would be rated a score between 1 and 10 by every committee member and not that each member's top ten would be awarded between 1 and 10 points. Additionally, the initial scores published on the TVP website were removed hours after being published after Polish fan media outlets noted that the point total did not match the number of points that was to be allocated; the corrected results were subsequently published the same day, together with the summary of each jury member's individual votes (presented above).

=== Promotion ===
As part of the promotion of her participation in the contest, Luna attended the Melfest WKND event in Stockholm on 8 March 2024, the PrePartyES in Madrid on 30 March 2024, the Barcelona Eurovision Party on 6 April 2024, the London Eurovision Party on 7 April 2024, the Nordic Music Celebration's Eurovision Night in Oslo on 20 April 2024 and the Copenhagen Eurovision Party (Malmöhagen) on 4 May 2024. She was also set to perform at the Eurovision in Concert event in Amsterdam on 13 April 2024 and the Nordic Eurovision Party in Stockholm on 14 April 2024, but ultimately opted to be absent in order to rest her voice.

== At Eurovision ==
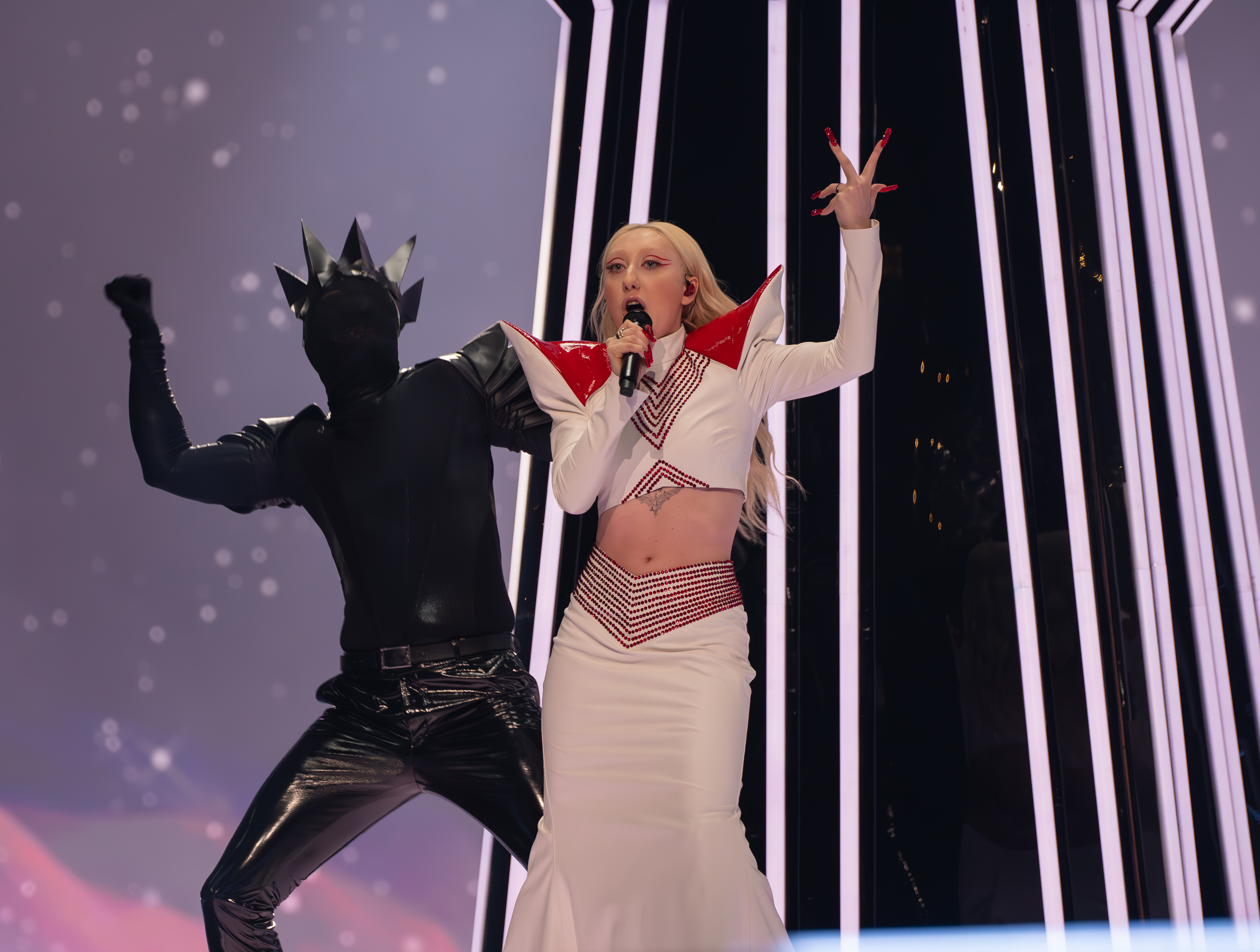
Luna during a dress rehearsal for the first semi-final on 6 May 2024.

The Eurovision Song Contest 2024 took place at the Malmö Arena in Malmö, Sweden, and consisted of two semi-finals held on the respective dates of 7 and 9 May and the final on 11 May 2024. All nations with the exceptions of the host country and the "Big Five" (France, Germany, Italy, Spain and the United Kingdom) were required to qualify from one of two semi-finals in order to compete in the final; the top ten countries from each semi-final progressed to the final. On 30 January 2024, an allocation draw was held to determine which of the two semi-finals, as well as which half of the show, each country would perform in; the European Broadcasting Union (EBU) split up the competing countries into different pots based on voting patterns from previous contests, with countries with favourable voting histories put into the same pot. Poland was scheduled for the first half of the first semi-final. The shows' producers then decided the running order for the semi-finals; Poland was set to perform in position 6.

In Poland, all shows were broadcast on TVP1 and the semi-finals on TVP Rozrywka as well, with commentary provided by Artur Orzech. TVP also aired the contest internationally through TVP Polonia.

=== Performance ===
Luna took part in technical rehearsals on 27 April and 1 May, followed by dress rehearsals on 6 and 7 May. Her performance of "The Tower" at the contest was staged by Jerry Reeve and choreographed by Lukas McFarlane and Kamila Zalewska, with Julia Żytko, Angus Simpson and Jordan Garcia as supporting dancers and Maciej Starnawski and Marta Dywicka as backing vocalists.

=== Semi-final ===
Poland performed in position 6, following the entry from Ukraine and before the entry from Croatia. The country was not announced among the top 10 entries in the semi-final and therefore failed to qualify to compete in the final. It was later revealed that Poland placed 12th with 35 points.

=== Voting ===
Below is a breakdown of points awarded by and to Poland in the first semi-final and in the final. Voting during the three shows involved each country awarding sets of points from 1-8, 10 and 12: one from their professional jury and the other from televoting in the final vote, while the semi-final vote was based entirely on the vote of the public. The Polish jury consisted of Łukasz Pieter, Marek Sierocki, Filip Sojka, Monika Wydrzyńska, and Natalia Zastępa. In the first semi-final, Poland placed 12th with 36 points. Over the course of the contest, Poland awarded its 12 points to Ukraine in the first semi-final, and to Switzerland (jury) and Ukraine (televote) in the final.

TVP appointed Viki Gabor, who won the 2019 junior contest for Poland, as its spokesperson to announce the Polish jury's votes in the final.

==== Points awarded to Poland ====
Points awarded to Poland (Semi-final 1)
Score	Televote
12 points	
10 points	
8 points	Iceland
7 points	Ireland
6 points	United Kingdom
5 points	
4 points	Lithuania
3 points	Sweden; Ukraine
2 points	Germany
1 point	Australia; Slovenia

==== Points awarded by Poland ====
Points awarded by Poland (Semi-final 1)
Score	Televote
12 points	Ukraine
10 points	Croatia
8 points	Ireland
7 points	Lithuania
6 points	Luxembourg
5 points	Finland
4 points	Slovenia
3 points	Portugal
2 points	Australia
1 point	Azerbaijan

Points awarded by Poland (Final)
Score	Televote	Jury
12 points	Ukraine	Switzerland
10 points	Croatia	Ukraine
8 points	Switzerland	Croatia
7 points	France	Italy
6 points	Ireland	Portugal
5 points	Israel	Sweden
4 points	Italy	Germany
3 points	Lithuania	France
2 points	Sweden	Latvia
1 point	Finland	Ireland

==== Detailed voting results ====
Each participating broadcaster assembles a five-member jury panel consisting of music industry professionals who are citizens of the country they represent. Each jury, and individual jury member, is required to meet a strict set of criteria regarding professional background, as well as diversity in gender and age. No member of a national jury was permitted to be related in any way to any of the competing acts in such a way that they cannot vote impartially and independently. The individual rankings of each jury member as well as the nation's televoting results were released shortly after the grand final.

The following members comprised the Polish jury:

- Łukasz Pieter
- Marek Sierocki
- Filip Sojka
- Monika Wydrzyńska
- Natalia Zastępa

Detailed voting results from Poland (Semi-final 1)
R/O	Country	Televote	
R/O	Country	Rank	Points
01	Cyprus	12	
02	Serbia	11	
03	Lithuania	4	7
04	Ireland	3	8
05	Ukraine	1	12
06	Poland		
07	Croatia	2	10
08	Iceland	14	
09	Slovenia	7	4
10	Finland	6	5
11	Moldova	13	
12	Azerbaijan	10	1
13	Australia	9	2
14	Portugal	8	3
15	Luxembourg	5	6

Detailed voting results from Poland (Final)
R/O	Country	Jury							Televote	
R/O	Country	Juror A	Juror B	Juror C	Juror D	Juror E	Rank	Points	Rank	Points
01	Sweden	12	3	10	5	7	6	5	9	2
02	Ukraine	2	5	5	6	2	2	10	1	12
03	Germany	5	8	19	7	4	7	4	14	
04	Luxembourg	17	6	16	20	12	14		21	
~~05~~	~~Netherlands~~ ‡ (Note: The Netherlands was disqualified prior to the final.)	~~21~~	~~16~~	~~14~~	~~2~~	~~25~~	~~10~~		N/A	
06	Israel	8	26	25	18	21	19		6	5
07	Lithuania	7	15	8	19	9	13		8	3
08	Spain	25	20	9	10	23	16		15	
09	Estonia	22	24	24	22	24	26		13	
10	Ireland	11	18	7	21	5	11	1	5	6
11	Latvia	18	2	17	8	15	9	2	18	
12	Greece	15	23	11	17	18	20		17	
13	United Kingdom	10	12	12	9	8	12		19	
14	Norway	20	11	13	16	17	18		12	
15	Italy	4	4	4	3	11	4	7	7	4
16	Serbia	13	13	15	26	13	17		24	
17	Finland	26	25	26	15	26	25		10	1
18	Portugal	3	9	6	23	3	5	6	25	
19	Armenia	16	19	23	24	20	24		11	
20	Cyprus	14	7	18	14	14	15		20	
21	Switzerland	1	1	1	4	1	1	12	3	8
22	Slovenia	24	14	21	25	16	23		23	
23	Croatia	6	10	2	1	10	3	8	2	10
24	Georgia	19	17	22	13	19	21		22	
25	France	9	21	3	11	6	8	3	4	7
26	Austria	23	22	20	12	22	22		16	
