= Luna (Polish singer) =

Polish singer and songwriter (born 1999)

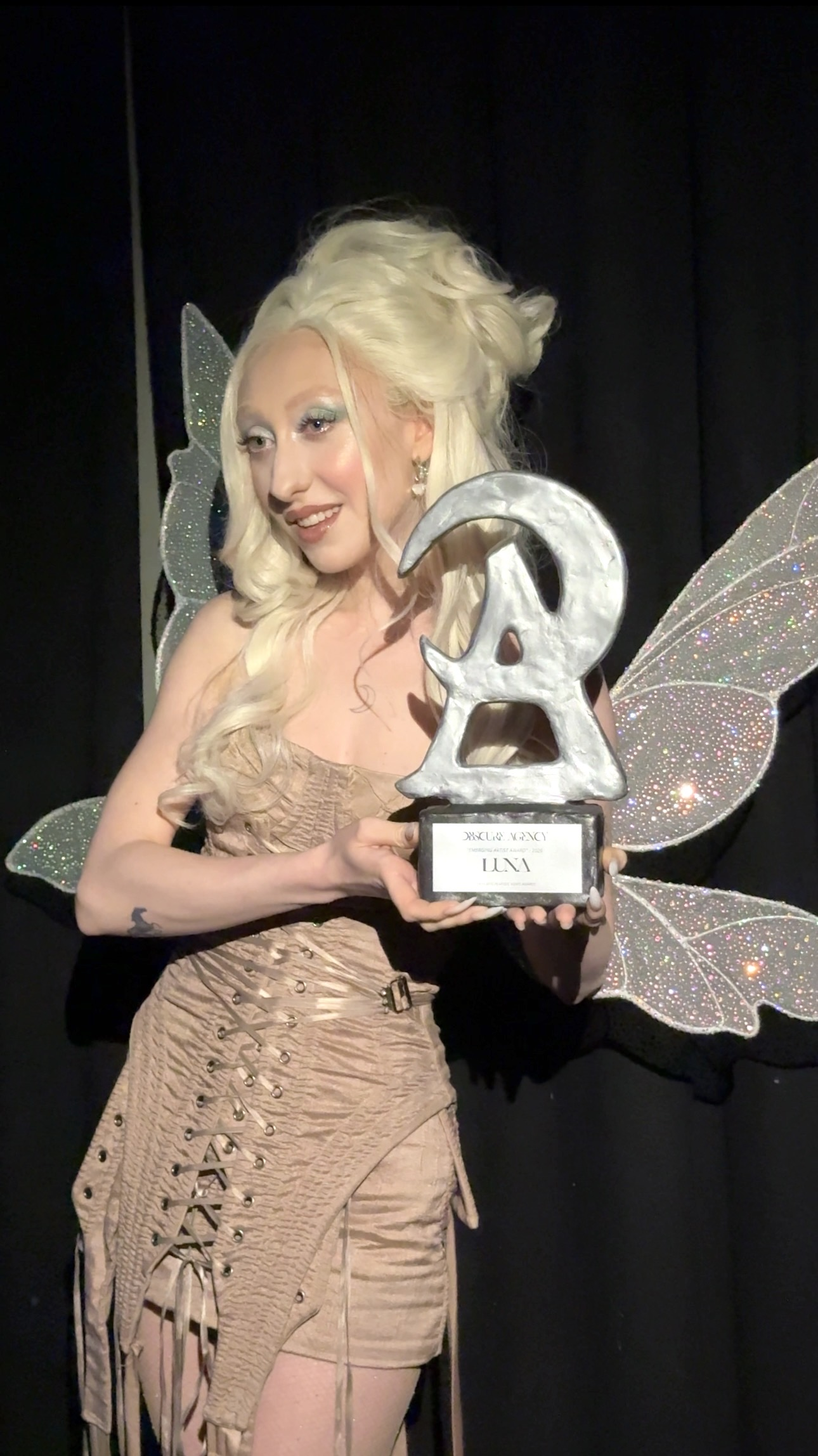
- Luna at Berlin Music Video Awards 2026

Background information
- Also known as: Fairy of Pop
- Born: Aleksandra Katarzyna Wielgomas; 28 August 1999 (age 27); Warsaw, Poland
- Genres: Pop; "fairy pop"; electronic; alternative
- Occupations: Singer; songwriter; model; actress
- Instruments: Vocals; piano; omnichord; violin
- Years active: 2018–present
- Labels: Universal Music Group; Kayax
- Website: fairypop.com

Luna Wielgomas (Polish pronunciation: [ˈluna vjɛlˈɡɔmas]; born Aleksandra Katarzyna Wielgomas, 28 August 1999), known mononymously as Luna (stylised in all caps), is a Polish singer and songwriter.

== Early life and education ==
Wielgomas was born on 28 August 1999 in Warsaw. She has three brothers and is a daughter of entrepreneur Andrzej Wielgomas. Her family manages Polish food processing family-owned company Dawtona. She studied at the Tadeusz Baird's "National Music School" in Grodzisk Mazowiecki, taking violin classes.

From 2015 to 2018, she attended a course in legal and political sciences. In 2018, she began studying academic course artes liberales at the University of Warsaw.

== Music career ==
=== Beginnings ===
In 2010, Wielgomas joined the Artos Children's Choir at the Grand Theatre in Warsaw, where she studied singing with Danuta Chmurska and performed in operas.

=== 2018–2019: Early Years ===
In 2018, Wielgomas established cooperation with the Kayax label as part of the "My Name Is New" project. It was then that she recorded her debut song titled "Na wzgórzach niepokoju". Released via Kayax on 19 September 2018, the single was composed by Marcin Nierubiec with lyrics by Wielgomas. The song was played on Polskie Radio Program III. In May 2019, Wielgomas performed in Jaga Hupało's studio during the Long Night of Museums. In June, she released the single "Zastyga" (English: Freezes). A month later, she played at the Naturalnie Mazury Festival. In August 2019, she performed at the Pol'n'Rock Festival.

=== 2020–2022: Career as Luna and release of "Caught In The Night" and "Nocne Zmory (Night Terrors)" ===
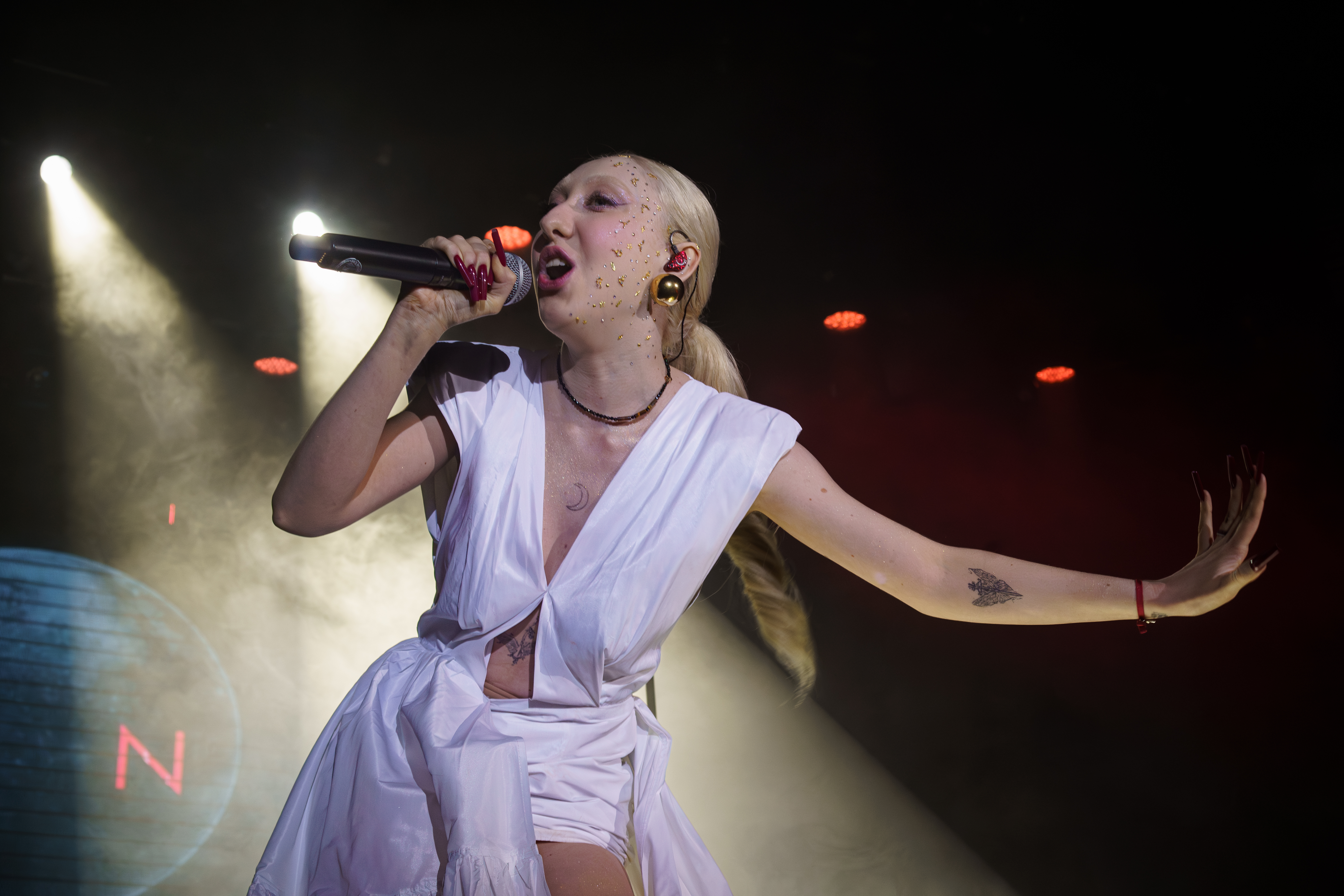
Luna performing in Madrid during PrePartyES 2024

In 2020, Wielgomas began her cooperation with composer Michał "Fox" Król, resulting in the single "Luna", which announced the singer's new artistic path. The title, meaning "Moon" in Latin and several Romance languages, would become Wielgomas' stage name; the singer attributed this choice to a connection that she feels with the satellite and with nighttime in general. Also in 2020, she recorded the song "Serca przemokną", which, however, was removed from the internet after a short time.

During the 28th finale of the Great Orchestra of Christmas Charity in January 2020, Luna played a concert in a television studio. In July, she performed at a concert with the band Cukier at the Stodoła Club in Warsaw. On 28 August, she sang the song "Dlaczego drzewa nic nie mówią" with Mela Koteluk. On 25 November 2020, she released the single "Zgaś". The song was very well received and was featured on the lists of the best Polish songs of 2020. The song was also played on many radios, including: in Chillizet, Radio Eska, or Polskie Radio Program I. In the song, she included sounds from space, published by NASA.

On 2 February 2021, Luna released the single "Mniej" (English: Less). In this song she also included sounds from space, including: with Venus (as a symbol of beauty, love and art) and Mercury (understanding). The song was included in Radio Wawa's Top 13, Radio Eska's Hot 20 and at the top of Radio Victoria's Alterlist. In the same year, a remix of the song performed by Skytech was published, which reached the top of the DJ Top 10 list.

On 29 April, she released the English-language version of the song "Zgaś", titled "Blind" as a single, and made a music video for the song. On 20 May, she released the single "Wirtualne Przedmieście", which talks about being on the border of the virtual and real world. She made a music video for the song, which was recorded at the National Museum of Ethnography in Warsaw. On 18 June, she released the English version of the song - "Virtual Rivers". On 12 August, she released the single "Zabierz Mnie" (English: Take Me Away) and on 10 September, "Melt Away".

=== 2024–2025: Eurovision Song Contest and "No Rest" ===
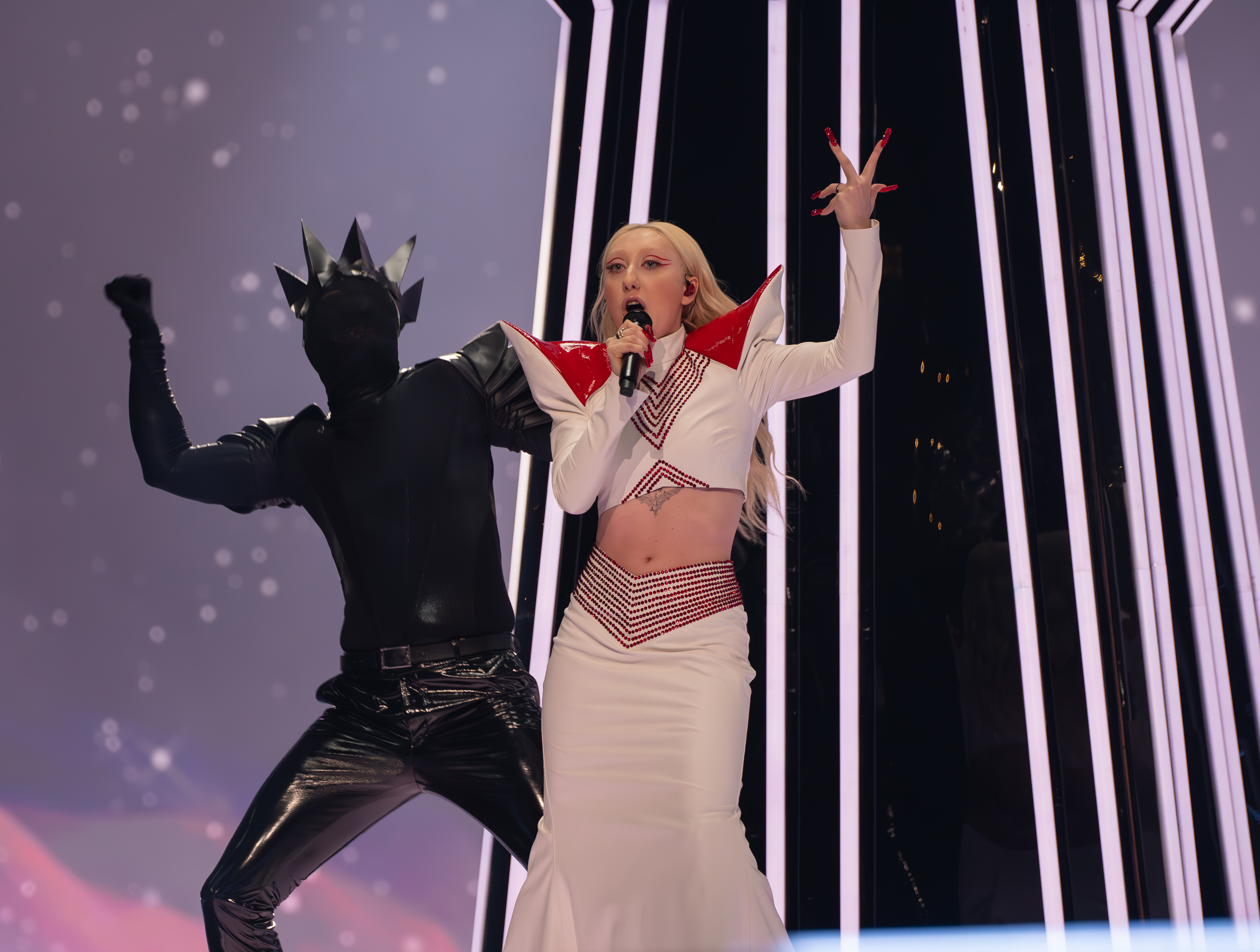
Luna performing in the first semi-final of the Eurovision Song Contest 2024

On 19 February 2024, Luna was announced as the Polish entrant in the Eurovision Song Contest 2024 with the song "The Tower". Luna failed to qualify from the first semi-final on 7 May 2024, placing 12th out of 15 with 35 points.

On 12 July 2024, Luna released the single "Alive", marking a shift toward more intimate electronic pop following her Eurovision entry. On 13 September 2024 she released single "Wild West" which combined electronic pop elements with a deep bass, frontier-like sound, and its accompanying music video wchich visually echoed the song's themes by employing stark landscapes, symbolic imagery, and cinematic transitions to reinforce the track's motifs of struggle, resilience, and freedom.

In October she appeared in the music video for ''Eurostar'' by Nemo, the winner of the Eurovision Song Contest 2024, alongside several other participants.

In November 2024, Luna moved to London.

On November she released "Personal Torture", with which she announced her second studio album No Rest. On 6 December 2024 she released standalone polish single "A może" (English: "Maybe"), which achieved notable success in Poland, reaching No. 7 on the official Polish singles chart (OLiS). In early 2025, Luna joined fellow Eurovision artist Windows95Man on his US tour, performing as a special guest at several venues across the country.

Her first international studio album, No Rest, was released on 7 February 2025. The record was created in collaboration with producers from the United Kingdom and Sweden, blending international influences into its electronic pop sound. Album focus track "Green Light" was featured on several Spotify's New Music Friday playlists. Additionally, the album was displayed for a week on a Times Square spotify billboard, highlighting its international reach and recognition.

Right after album release she went on tours as supporting act with Loreen and Sugababes on their '25 Tour, performing before the latter in biggest European arenas. She also collaborated with Swedish indie artist ionnalee on a remix of her song ''8 AM'' from the album No Rest, which was released as a promotional single on 9 May 2025.

=== 2025–present: Fairy Pop ===
In October 2025, Luna announced the stand-alone single "Hush Hush" (stylized as "Hush husH") through a dedicated phone number called "Fairy Hotline" in which fans could listen to a snippet of the song and to a message from artist. The song was premiered on 31 October 2025, as a Halloween special. Additionally, Luna performed the song along with song "8 am" live for the first time during the fashion show at Paris Fashion Week on 4 October 2025. During a series of live performances in late 2025, Luna premiered unreleased song "Undiscovered". Before performance Luna revealed that the song had originally been considered as a potential entry for the Polish selection process for the Eurovision Song Contest 2024. However, the song was ultimately not submitted, with "The Tower" being chosen instead.

"Away With The Fairies" was released as the lead single from an upcoming album on 30 January 2026. The song introduced the album's fantasy-inspired aesthetic and marked the beginning of Luna's independent era. The single received international media attention, being featured in BASIC Magazine and Times Monaco. The accompanying music video was released on the same day and later received a nomination in the Best Song category at the Berlin Music Video Awards finishing up second.

The album's second single, "Heavenly", was released on 20 March 2026 along with music video. The song achieved strong international support on its release day, landing on Spotify's New Music Friday playlists in 32 regions and being featured on more than 40 editorial playlists across the platform.

"Ashtray" was released as the third single from her album on 8 May 2026. Serving as one of the darker entries in the album's campaign, the song explored themes of emotional dependency and toxic attachment. Upon release critics highlighted the contrast between the song's melancholic lyrics and pop production.

On 15 May 2026, Luna officially announced the title of her third studio album as Fairy Pop, also revealing the official artwork and release date through her social media channels. On 1 June 2026, Luna unveiled the album's official track listing. Fairy Pop premiered on 16 June 2026 along with music video for "Lucky Secret", which served as album fourth single. record consists of nine tracks and was described by the singer as her most personal and conceptually cohesive project to date. "Lucky Secret" was featured on several Spotify's New Music Friday playlists. Additionally, the album was displayed for a week on a Times Square spotify billboard, as part of Spotify Global Release Day campaign and international New Music Daily playlist by Apple Music.

On 13 June 2026, Luna performed at the 14th edition of the Berlin Music Video Awards in Berlin, Germany. Opening the festival's final day, she presented a medley of "Away With The Fairies" and "Heavenly". During the festival, Luna was also honored with the Emerging Artist Award, presented under the patronage of Obscure Agency, recognizing her growing international presence and artistic achievements.

"Skydive" was released as fifth single from the album along with its music video on 28 August 2026. The video premiered exclusively on the website of German fashion and culture magazine KALTBLUT day ahead of its wider release.

=== Other activities ===
From 2015 to 2017, LUNA played the role of a Cracovian woman in the theatrical play "Miracle or Cracovians and Highlanders" at Grand Theatre in Warsaw. She was also associated with the theater drama club "at Machulski" founded by Halina Machulska and Juliusz Machulski. LUNA is an ambassador of the Spotify Equarl initiative. She was one of the first 35 artists selected for the programme's inaugural cohort and the first ambassador from Poland. On October she made her runway debut at Paris Fashion Week, modelling for the Belgian fashion brand Judassime for their Spring/Summer 2026 collection named Lost Highway.

== Artistry ==
Wielgomas is interested in astrology, philosophy, art, ecology, and fashion. She cites Nick Cave, Lady Gaga and Björk as her "biggest inspirations". In an interview with Radosław Pulkowski from the K-Mag magazine in December 2020, she indicated nature as her inspiration, in particular the connections between the micro and macro worlds, which she sees in them. She is also fascinated by poetry, particularly the work of Bolesław Leśmian. Wielgomas has stated that "Luna" is her alter ego, which is "full of secrets and magic". She adopted the nickname "Luna", because it means the Moon from Latin, which great influence she observes in her life. She added that the nickname is also related to her sleepwalking. In October 2024, she changed her legal name to Luna Wielgomas.

Luna describes her music as emotionally characterized. It has repeatedly been depicted as mysterious and she describes her sound as "cosmic pop" and "fairy pop".

== Discography ==
=== Studio albums ===
Title	Album details	Peak chart positions
Title	Album details	POL
Nocne zmory	Released: 22 April 2022; Label: Polydor, Universal Music Group; Format: CD, digital download, streaming	14
No Rest	Released: 7 February 2025, 11 April 2025 (LP); Label: Polydor, Universal Music Group; Format: CD, LP, digital download, streaming	2
Fairy Pop	Released: 26 June 2026; Label: Self-released, Universal Music Group; Format: CD, LP, digital download, streaming	—

=== Extended plays ===
Title	Details
Caught in the Night	Released: 26 November 2021; Label: Universal Music Group; Format: CD, Digital download, streaming

=== Singles ===
==== As lead artist ====
Title	Year	Peak chart positions			Certifications	Album or EP
Title	Year	POL	POL Stream.	LTU	Certifications	Album or EP
"Na wzgórzach niepokoju"	2018	—	*	—		Non-album singles
"Zastyga"	2019	—	*	—		Non-album singles
"Luna"	2020	—	*	—		Non-album singles
"Zgaś"	2020	—	*	—		Nocne zmory
"Mniej"	2021	—	*	—		Nocne zmory
"Wirtualne przedmieście"	2021	—	*	—		Nocne zmory
"Zabierz mnie"	2021	—	*	—		Nocne zmory
"Blind"	2021	—	*	—		Caught in the Night
"Virtual Rivers"	2021	—	*	—		Caught in the Night
"Melt Away"	2021	—	*	—		Caught in the Night
"Niewypowiedziane"	2021	—	*	—		Nocne zmory
"Carol of the Bells"	2021	—	*	—		Non-album single
"Wystarczy"	2022	—	*	—		Nocne zmory
"W Ogniu Się Unoszę"	2022	—	*	—		Nocne zmory
"Nie budź mnie"	2022	—	*	—		Nocne zmory
"Nocne zmory"	2022	—	*	—		Nocne zmory
"Czerwien moich ust"	2022	—	*	—		Nocne zmory
"Dynamit"	2022	—	*	—		Non-album singles
"Już nie zasnę"	2023	—	—	—		Non-album singles
"Moja miłość"	2023	—	—	—		Non-album singles
"Lekko"	2023	—	—	—		Non-album singles
"Lost and Wild"	2023	—	—	—		Non-album singles
"The Tower"	2024	20	80	60	ZPAV: Gold	No Rest
"Alive"	2024	—	—	—		No Rest
"Wild West"	2024	—	—	—		No Rest
"Personal Torture"	2024	—	—	—		No Rest
"A może"	2024	7	—	—		Non-album single
"Green Light"	2025	—	—	—		No Rest
"Hideaway" / "Wszystko Gra"	2025	—	—	—		No Rest
"Hush Hush"	2025	—	—	—		Non-album single
"Away with the Fairies"	2026	—	—	—		Fairy Pop
"Heavenly"	2026	—	—	—		Fairy Pop
"Ashtray"	2026	—	—	—		Fairy Pop
"Lucky Secret"	2026	—	—	—		Fairy Pop
"Skydive"	2026	—	—	—		Fairy Pop
"—" denotes items which were not released in that country or failed to chart. " * " denotes the chart did not exist at that time.

==== Promo singles ====
Year	Title	Peak chart positions		Album or EP
Year	Title	POL		Album or EP
Year	Title	Deezer	iTunes	Album or EP
2021	„Zgaś (Cosmic Acoustic)”	12	63	–
2021	„Mniej (Skytech Remix)”	–	–	–
2025	„8 am (ionnalee remix)" (with ionnalee)	–	–	–
2025	„Alive (PS1 Remix)”	–	–	–
"—" denotes items which were not released in that country or failed to chart.

==== As featured artist ====
Title	Year	Album or EP
"Nie proszę o więcej" (Marcin Maciejczak featuring LUNA)	2021	Tamte dni
"Nie mój sen" (Justyna Steczkowska featuring LUNA)	2022	Szamanka
"Ciepło-Zimno" (Marie featuring LUNA)	2022	Babyhands
"Subterranean" (Miss Monique and Avira featuring LUNA)	2023	Non-album single

== Tours ==
=== As supporting act ===
- 2025: USA TOUR 2025 with Windows95man
- 2025: Tour Life with Loreen
- 2025: Sugababes '25 Tour with Sugababes
- 2025: Break The Code Europe Tour with Nemo

== Awards and nominations ==
Year	Award	Category	Nominee(s)	Result	Ref.
2021	Empik Bestsellers	Discoveries of the Year	"Caught in the Night"	Nominated	
2024	Eurovision Awards	Non-Qualifying Show-Stopper	Herself	Nominated	
2026	Berlin Music Video Awards	Best Song	"Away With The Fairies"	Second place	
2026	Berlin Music Video Awards	Emerging Artist Award (Obscure Agency)	Herself	Won	

Awards and achievements
Preceded by Blanka with "Solo"	Poland in the Eurovision Song Contest; 2024	Succeeded by Justyna Steczkowska with "Gaja"
