= The Tower (song) =

2024 song by Luna

Single by Luna

from the album No Rest
- Released: 23 January 2024
- Recorded: 2022
- Genre: Pop
- Length: 3:00
- Label: Universal
- Songwriters: Luna; Paul Dixon; Max Cooke
- Producer: Paul Dixon

Luna singles chronology
"Lost and Wild" (2023)	"The Tower" (2024)	"Alive" (2024)

Music video
- "The Tower" on YouTube

Eurovision Song Contest 2024 entry
- Country: Poland
- Artist: Luna
- Language: English
- Composers: Luna; Paul Dixon; Max Cooke
- Lyricists: Luna; Paul Dixon; Max Cooke

Finals performance
- Semi-final result: 12th
- Semi-final points: 35

Entry chronology
- ◄ "Solo" (2023)
- "Gaja" (2025) ►

Official performance video
- "The Tower" (First Semi-Final) on YouTube

"The Tower" is a song by singer-songwriter Luna. Self-described as an account of the journey of strength and self-realization from the depths of darkness and negativity, it was co-written by Luna, Paul Dixon and Max Cooke, and was released on 23 January 2024 by Universal Music Group. The song represented Poland in the Eurovision Song Contest 2024, and finished in 12th place with 35 points during semi final 1.

== Background and composition ==
"The Tower" was written and composed by Luna, Paul Dixon, and Max Cooke. In interviews, Luna has stated that the song is about a journey to self-realization and self-actualization from the negativity humanity faces. The song uses the metaphor of a tower of negativity and limited potential, urging the listener to topple the tower with strength. Luna later stated in an interview with Wiwibloggs that she wanted others to "create your own rules in the world, your own terms and build your own tower – the one that leads to your destiny, something that is great for your life and for your happiness".

The song officially premiered on 23 January 2024 at the Spatif nightclub in Warsaw. Around a month later, the song was announced by Telewizja Polska, Poland's broadcaster for the Eurovision Song Contest, to represent the country for the Eurovision Song Contest 2024.

During a series of live performances in late 2025, Luna premiered the previously unreleased song "Undiscovered". Before performance she revealed that it had originally been considered as a potential entry for the Polish selection process for the Eurovision Song Contest 2024. However, the song was ultimately not submitted, with "The Tower" being chosen instead.

== Critical reception ==
Vulture's Jon O'Brien ranked the song seventh out of 37 Eurovision entries, opining that it "echoes" Ellie Goulding, Aurora and Grimes. He concluded: "[It] is the kind of featherlight synth-pop that seems tailor-made not for Eurovision but for trendy Spotify playlists. In years to come, this may be regarded as 2024's lost gem." On the other hand, Erin Adam of The Scotsman gave the song a rating of 6 out of 10, but called it "frothy" and "catchy".

== Music video and promotion ==
Along with the song's premiere, an accompanying music video was released. According to Luna, the music video uses the metaphor of chess to describe the relationships she has endured. Luna has stated in interviews that the appearance of her opponent represents struggles in her life, including "crossing boundaries". The duel itself represents her facing different loved ones and their relationships, and by the end of the video, she is battling herself, knowing that she has to defeat her past self to create her own fate.

To further promote the song, Luna confirmed her intent to participate in several Eurovision pre-parties, including the Nordic Music Celebration, the London Eurovision Party, Pre-Party ES 2024, and the Barcelona Eurovision Party 2024.

== Eurovision Song Contest ==
=== Internal selection ===
Poland's broadcaster Telewizja Polska (TVP) announced its intent to participate in the Eurovision Song Contest 2024 on 20 September 2023. Following a controversy surrounding the previous year and its selection, TVP considered switching to an internal selection; this was later confirmed in January 2024. After 22 songs were shortlisted, a five-member internal committee awarded scores from 1 to 10 to ten of the received submissions on 13 February. Six days later, Luna and her song were revealed to be Poland's representatives for the contest, winning by one point over second-place finisher, Justyna Steczkowska's "Witch-er Tarohoro".

=== At Eurovision ===
The Eurovision Song Contest 2024 took place at the Malmö Arena in Malmö, Sweden, and consisted of two semi-finals held on the respective dates of 7 and 9 May and the final on 11 May 2024. During the allocation draw on 30 January 2024, Poland was drawn to compete in the first semi-final, performing in the first half of the show. She was later drawn to perform sixth in the semi-final, ahead of Ukraine's duo of Alyona Alyona and Jerry Heil and behind Croatia's Baby Lasagna. For its Eurovision performance, creative artist Jerry Reeve was put in charge of the song's staging. The song failed to qualify for the final.

== Charts ==
Chart performance for "The Tower"
Chart (2024)	Peak position
Lithuania (AGATA)	60
Poland (Polish Airplay Top 100)	20
Poland (Polish Streaming Top 100)	80

== Certifications ==
Certifications for "The Tower"
Region	Certification	Certified units/sales
Poland (ZPAV)	Gold	25,000^{‡}
^{‡} Sales+streaming figures based on certification alone.

== Release history ==
Release history and formats for "The Tower"
Country	Date	Format(s)	Version	Label	Ref.
Various	23 January 2024	Digital download; streaming	Original	Universal Music Polska	
Various	28 March 2024	Digital download; streaming	Acoustic	Universal Music Polska	
Poland	30 April 2024	12"	Original; acoustic; revamp; radio edit	Universal Music Polska	
