= Justyna Steczkowska =

Polish singer (born 1972)

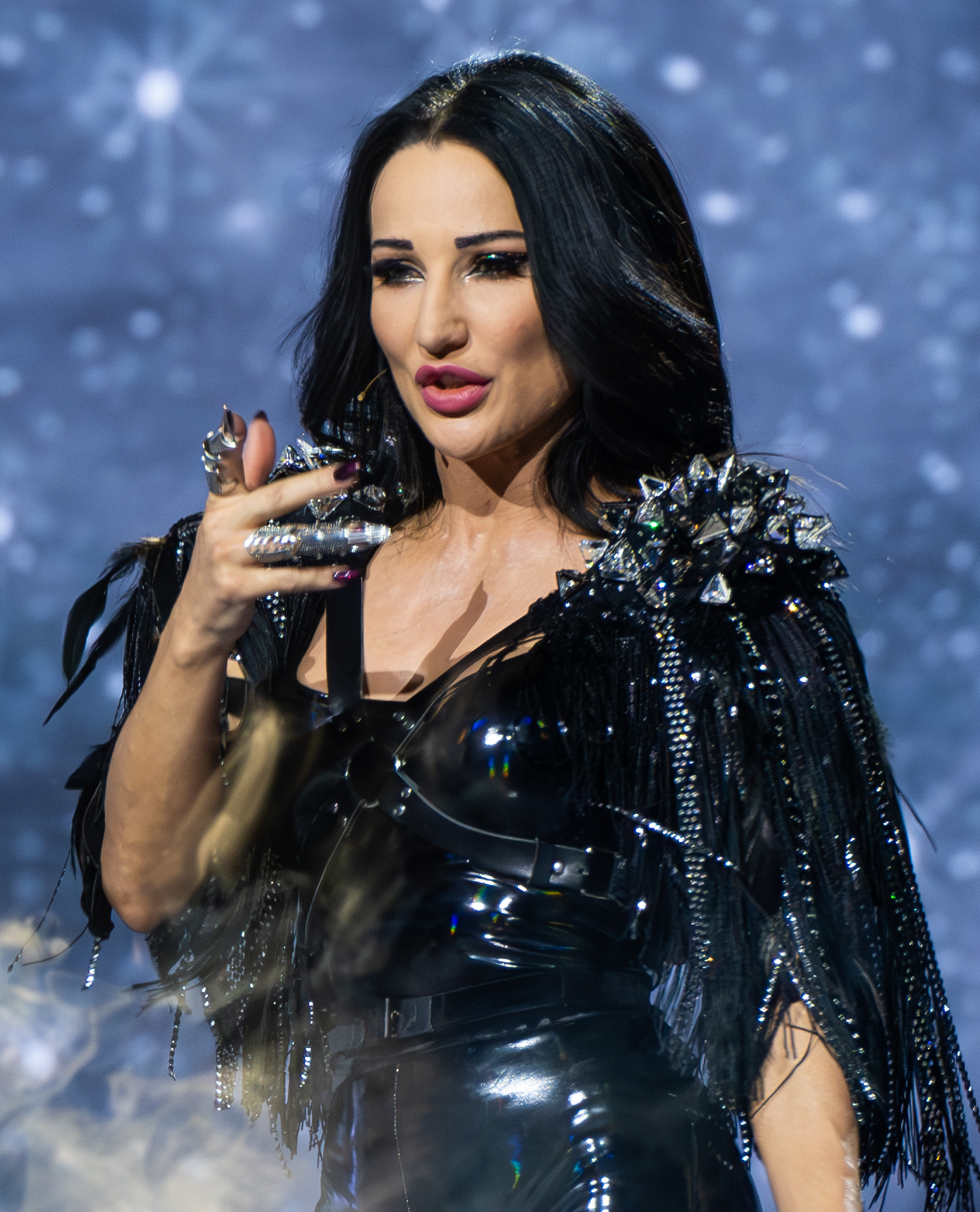
- Steczkowska in 2025

Background information
- Born: Justyna Maria Steczkowska; 2 August 1972 (age 54); Rzeszów, Poland
- Genres: Pop; alternative; trip hop; world
- Occupations: Singer; songwriter
- Instruments: Vocals; violin
- Years active: 1992–present
- Labels: independent artist; Pomaton EMI; EMI Music Poland; QL Music; Luna Music; JS Music
- Spouse: Maciej Myszkowski
- Website: www.justynasteczkowska.pl

Justyna Maria Steczkowska (Polish pronunciation: [juˈstɨna stɛt͡ʂˈkɔfska]; born 2 August 1972) is a Polish singer and songwriter. She represented Poland in the Eurovision Song Contest 1995 with the song "Sama", finishing in 18th place overall with 15 points, representing the country again in the Eurovision Song Contest 2025 with the song "Gaja", finishing in 14th place overall with 156 points.

== Life and career ==
=== Early life and musical roots ===
She was born in Rzeszów, in the Subcarpathian region of southeastern Poland. She is the fourth of nine children of Danuta and Stanisław Steczkowski, a music teacher and conductor.

When she was five years old, she moved with her family to Stalowa Wola, where she attended the Ignacy Jan Paderewski State Music School. In 1991, she graduated from a music high school belonging to the Music School Complex No. 1 in Rzeszów. Later she moved to Gdańsk to study at a musical academy but she dropped out to focus on singing. She played violin in a family band and was a singer in rock and jazz bands before embarking on a solo career.

=== Breakthrough with "Boskie Buenos" ===
In 1994, Steczkowska participated in auditions for a television talent show Szansa na sukces. Dissatisfied with her performance of a song "Nie przynoś mi kwiatów, dziewczyno" by Trubadurzy, she was given another chance to compete. She came to prominence in June 1994 when she eventually won the show with the performance of Maanam's hit "Boskie Buenos (Buenos Aires)". Afterwards, the same year, she performed her first non-album single "Moja intymność" at the 31st National Festival of Polish Song in Opole where she won the main "Karolinka" award and was notably praised by Irena Santor, one of the legends of the Polish music.

=== Eurovision Song Contest debut ===
As a promising young artist, Steczkowska was selected to represent Poland in the Eurovision Song Contest 1995 with the song "Sama" (transl. Alone). With the track characterized by its introspective and melancholic tone, set in a minor key with folky, downbeat elements, she finished in 18th place overall with 15 points.

=== Career-defining Dziewczyna Szamana ===
After winning the final of the Baltic Countries Song Festival in July 1995, Steczkowska began preparations for her first record. She worked closely with Grzegorz Ciechowski, a well-known musician who specifically used a pen name Ewa Omernik and with whom she spent a few months recording in Kazimierz Dolny.

In March 1996, Steczkowska's debut solo album was released. Combining esoteric themes and jazz-influenced production, Dziewczyna Szamana was both a critical and commercial success. The title track, along with singles like "Grawitacja" and "Oko za oko, słowo za słowo", remain staples of her repertoire and are among her most iconic songs. In April 1997, Steczkowska was triumphant, having earned four Fryderyk awards for every category in which she was nominated.

=== Evolving sound and collaborations ===
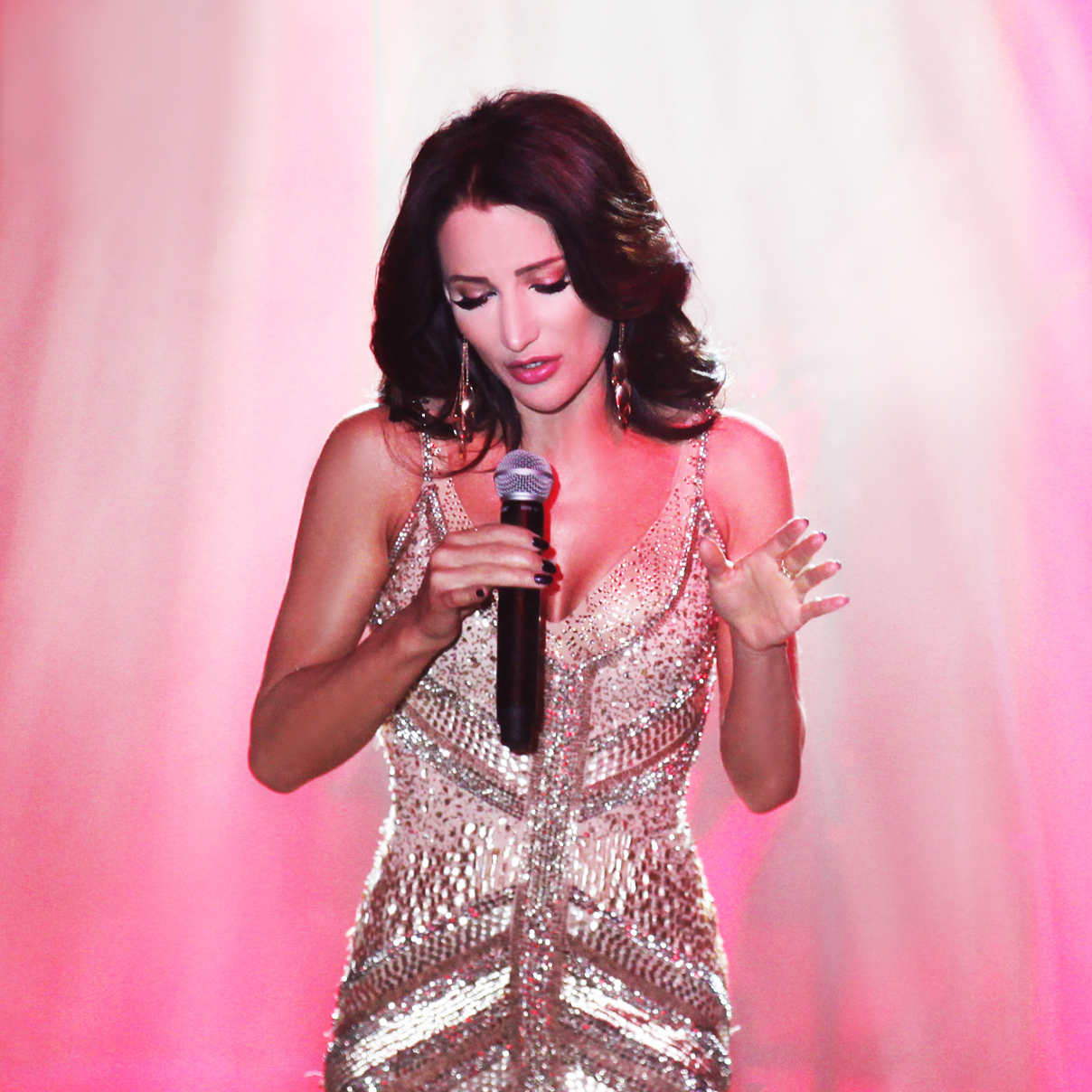
Steczkowska performing in 2016

After the debut, in October 1997, Steczkowska released the album Naga, an optimistically melancholic follow-up to the previous record, most known for a single "Za karę". In August 1999, she composed the soundtrack album produced by her brother for the film Na koniec świata promoted by the trip hop title track.

A year later, she released Dzień i noc marked by the single "Kosmiczna rewolucja". This album saw her embrace new musical landscape leaning into electronic. On this record, she collaborated with other prominent Polish female artists, Katarzyna Nosowska and Edyta Bartosiewicz.

In November 2001, Steczkowska released a collaborative album Mów do mnie jeszcze with Paweł Deląg, where they used poems by William Shakespeare, Cyprian Kamil Norwid, Jonasz Kofta, Kazimierz Przerwa-Tetmajer, or Maria Pawlikowska-Jasnorzewska.

Seeking to produce something enduring and beyond musical trends, Steczkowska collaborated with renowned producer Mateusz Pospieszalski and lyricist Roman Kołakowski, and in October 2002 released the album Alkimja. Inspired by Ashkenazi Jewish culture, featuring songs sung in Hebrew, Aramaic, Ladino, and Yiddish, the album earned her a Fryderyk award for Ethno-Folk Album of the Year.

In 2004, she released Femme Fatale, an album of her interpretations of songs originally performed by famous Polish and international female singers, inspired by figures like Kalina Jędrusik, Anna German, Marilyn Monroe, Édith Piaf, Dalida, and Marlene Dietrich.

Afterwards, Steczkowska focused on more pop-leaning albums, Daj mi chwilę (2007) with elements of smooth jazz and To mój czas (2009) with a variety of styles; she also self-composed two collections of lullabies for children Puchowe kołysanki (2008 and 2013). In 2012, she released XV, an album with Gothic rock, techno and trip-hop reinterpretations of her earlier songs with some new tracks, which ultimately saw her reembrace ambient, mystical and oriental fascinations, cemented by Anima (2014) and All Is One (2019). The latter was her first exclusively English-language record and was originally available for free, released under an alter ego pseudonym Maria Magdalena.

Her further discography includes Szamanka (2022), and Steczkowska Demarczyk (2023) as well as other collaborative albums: cabaret-inspired Mezalianse (2011) with Maciej Maleńczuk and Balkan-influenced I na co mi to było? (2015) with Boban Marković.

=== Witch Tarohoro and Eurovision comeback ===
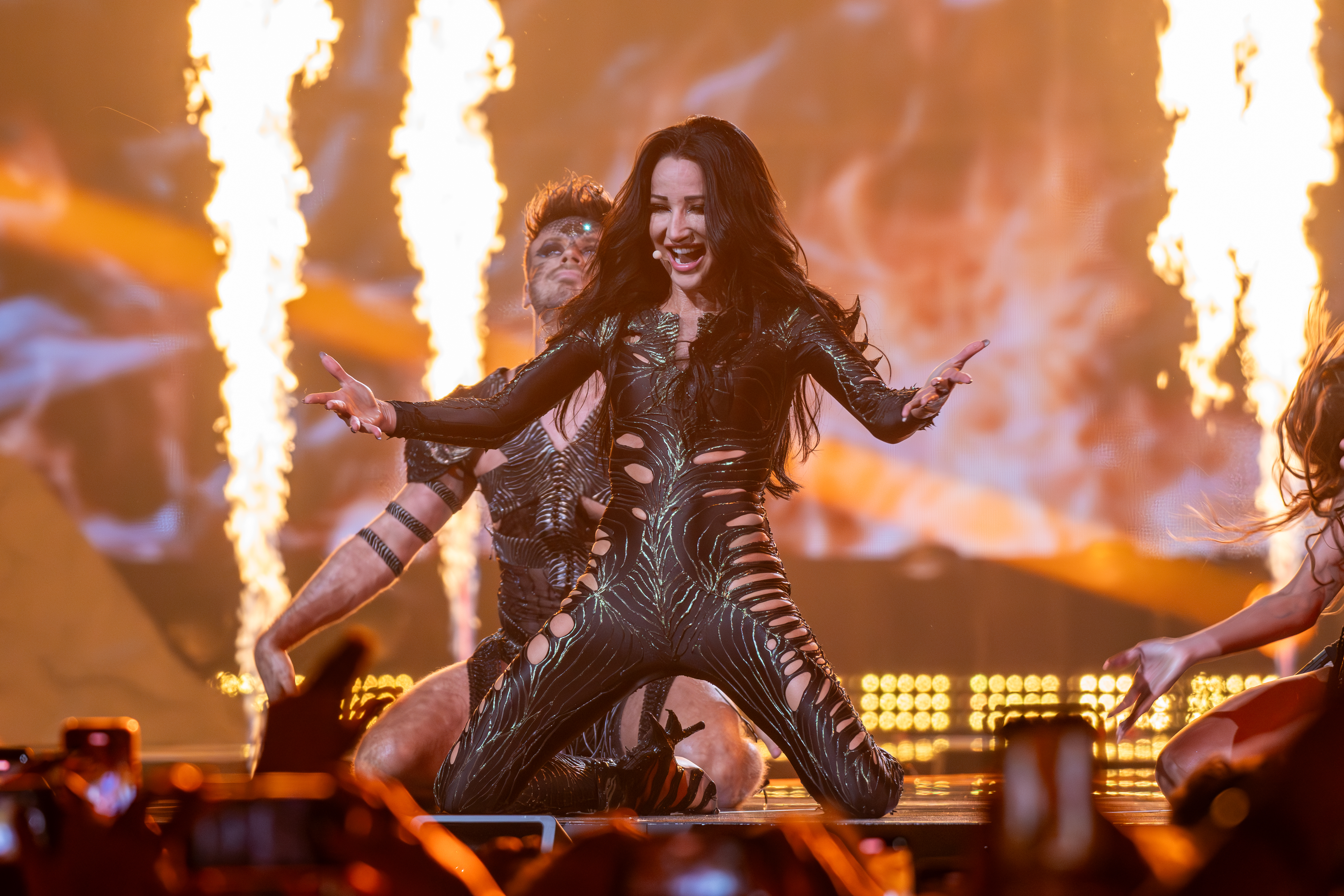
Steczkowska performing during first semi-final of Eurovision Song Contest 2025

On 29 December 2023, Steczkowska released a single "Witch Tarohoro", the song she chose to perform at Poland's national selection for the Eurovision Song Contest 2024. She finished second, losing to Luna. "Witch Tarohoro", however, would become a title track of her album blending themes of Slavic mythology, spirituality, and nature, released in November 2024. Next year she won the national final of Poland's national preselection for the Eurovision Song Contest 2025 with another song from this album, "Gaja". Steczkowska represented Poland again after three decades. Her gap of 30 years between two participations breaks the previous record of 24 years set by Anna Vissi between her entries for Cyprus in 1982 and Greece in 2006. She advanced to the final of the competition in the first semifinal on 13 May 2025. In the grand final on 17 May 2025, she placed 14th with 156 points. As a result, the song "Gaja" entered Spotify's global Viral 50 chart, making Steczkowska the first Polish female artist to achieve this milestone. It also appeared on Spotify's Top 50 – Poland chart and numerous editorial playlists on the platform. On 23 May 2025, she performed during Polsat Hit Festival 2025 in the "Radiowy Przebój Roku" concert. On 25 June, she took part in the "Wrocław Przyszłości" concert, which was broadcast by Polsat. Two days later, she performed the song Silver for Monsters from the video game The Witcher 3: Wild Hunt during the European Music Celebration in Poznań, marking the end of Poland's presidency of the Council of the European Union. During the summer of the same year, she hosted the weekly radio show Diva w kapciach on RMF FM. On 10 July, she released the summer club single Tańcz. In the same month, the single Pójdę tam by Staszek z Gór was released, featuring Steczkowska as a guest artist. On 27 September, she performed during Polsat's concert Roztańczony Narodowy. On 16 November, she made a guest appearance in the final episode of the 30th season of Dancing with the Stars. Taniec z gwiazdami. In early December, she released a compilation album of Christmas songs and carols titled Kolędy i Pastorałki. On Christmas Eve, Polsat broadcast the musical special Wielkie Kolędowanie z Polsatem featuring Steczkowska, and on New Year's Eve she performed at TVP2's Sylwester z Dwójką.

In January 2026, as part of the 30th anniversary of the release of her debut album, she published a dance version of the song Oko za oko from that album, remixed by her son Leon. In February, she presented a new dance version of Dziewczyna Szamana, followed at the end of March by Stu policjantów. At the same time, she announced the release of the lead single promoting her duets album Mezalianse. The first single was Mamacita, recorded with Skolim. Additionally, to celebrate the 30th anniversary of her artistic career, she embarked on a jubilee concert tour featuring repertoire from her previous albums. The series began with the project Maria Magdalena. All Is One in a planetarium. In April, the artist planned performances featuring the repertoire of Ewa Demarczyk, followed from September by the Roma Symfonica tour. On 22 May 2026, she is scheduled to perform during Polsat Hit Festival 2026 in Sopot. On 5 June, she is set to celebrate her 30th artistic anniversary with a jubilee recital during the National Festival of Polish Song in Opole, broadcast by TVP1.

== Other ventures ==
Apart from her music endeavours, she has starred in the films Billboard and Na koniec świata ("To the End of the World"). She was also a runner-up in season six of the Polish version of Dancing with the Stars in 2007, co-hosted the Polish version of Dancing on Ice in 2008, was a coach on The Voice of Poland in seasons 2, 4–5, and 12–14, with two of her contestants winning the competition, and has served as a judge on the Polish version of Your Face Sounds Familiar since 2024. She has appeared in several advertising campaigns, and designed her own clothing collection for girls. She is actively involved in charity work.

== Legacy ==
Steczkowska is known for her four-octave vocal range. She has won numerous music awards, including six Fryderyk awards, two Wiktor awards, a Superjedynka and a Bursztynowy Słowik. She has also been honored with the Bronze Gloria Artis Medal for Merit to Culture, and has been ranked among Forbes Poland's most valuable stars of Polish show business numerous times.

== Discography ==
=== Solo albums ===
==== 1990s ====
Title	Album details	Peak chart positions	Certifications
Title	Album details	POL	Certifications
Dziewczyna Szamana	Released: 18 March 1996; Label: Pomaton EMI; Formats: Cassette, CD, digital download	28	ZPAV: Platinum
Naga	Released: 27 October 1997; Label: Pomaton EMI; Formats: Cassette, CD, digital download	—	ZPAV: Gold
"—" denotes a recording that did not chart or was not released in that territory.

==== 2000s ====
Title	Album details	Peak chart positions	Certifications
Title	Album details	POL	Certifications
Dzień i Noc	Released: 21 February 2000; Label: Pomaton EMI; Formats: Cassette, CD, digital download	—	
Alkimja	Released: 21 October 2002; Label: Luna Music; Formats: CD, digital download	11	ZPAV: Gold
Femme Fatale	Released: 6 December 2004; Label: Pomaton EMI; Formats: CD	34	
Daj mi chwilę	Released: 4 June 2007; Label: EMI Music Poland; Formats: CD, digital download	3	ZPAV: Gold
To mój czas	Released: 23 March 2009; Label: EMI Music Poland; Formats: CD, digital download	11	
"—" denotes a recording that did not chart or was not released in that territory.

==== 2010s ====
Title	Album details	Peak chart positions
Title	Album details	POL
XV	Released: 2 April 2012; Label: Self-released; Formats: CD, digital download	20
Anima	Released: 25 November 2014; Label: Self-released; Formats: CD, digital download	24
Maria Magdalena. All Is One	Released: 22 February 2019; Label: Self-released; Formats: CD, digital download	31

==== 2020s ====
Title	Album details	Peak chart positions
Title	Album details	POL
Szamanka	Released: 25 February 2022; Label: Self-released; Formats: CD, digital download	23
Steczkowska Demarczyk	Released: 15 December 2023; Label: Self-released; Formats: CD, digital download, LP	—
Witch Tarohoro	Released: 29 November 2024; Label: Self-released; Formats: CD, digital download	31
"—" denotes a recording that did not chart or was not released in that territory.

=== Children dedicated albums ===
Title	Album details	Peak chart positions
Title	Album details	POL
Puchowe kołysanki	Released: 19 May 2008; Label: S.O.S. Music/EMI Music Poland; Formats: CD	10
Puchowe kołysanki 2	Released: 20 May 2013; Label: Madevent/Mystic Production; Formats: CD	17

=== Collaborative albums ===
Title	Album details	Peak chart positions
Title	Album details	POL
Mów do mnie jeszcze (with Paweł Deląg)	Released: 26 November 2001; Label: Mimofon; Formats: CD	—
Mezalianse (with Maciej Maleńczuk)	Released: 21 February 2011; Label: QL Music/Olesiejuk; Formats: CD, digital download	12
I na co mi to było? (with Boban Marković)	Released: 23 October 2015; Label: T1-Teraz; Formats: CD, digital download	38
"—" denotes a recording that did not chart or was not released in that territory.

== Singles ==
=== 1990s ===
Title	Year	Peak chart positions	Album
Title	Year	POL Music & Media	Album
"Moja intymność"	1995	—	Non-album singles
"Sama"	1995	4	Non-album singles
"Dziewczyna Szamana"	1995	—	Dziewczyna Szamana
"Grawitacja"	1996	7	Dziewczyna Szamana
"Oko za oko, słowo za słowo"	1996	13	Dziewczyna Szamana
"Niekochani"	1996	—	Dziewczyna Szamana
"Tatuuj mnie"	1997	—	Dziewczyna Szamana
"Za dużo wiesz"	1997	2	Naga
"Za karę"	1998	1	Naga
"Kici kici maj"	1998	—	Naga
"Kryminalna miłość"	1998	1	Naga
"Na koniec świata"	1999	19	Na koniec świata
"—" denotes a recording that did not chart or was not released in that territory.

=== 2000s ===
Title	Year	Peak chart positions	Album
Title	Year	POL Music & Media	Album
"Kosmiczna rewolucja"	2000	—	Dzień i Noc
"Świat jest niewierny"	2000	19	Dzień i Noc
"Podróżując"	2000	19	Dzień i Noc
"To koniec!"	2000	—	Dzień i Noc
"Śpiewaj "Yidl mitn fidl""	2002	—	Alkimja
"Świt! Świt!"	2002	—	Alkimja
"Wszyscy braćmi być powinni"	2003	—	Alkimja
"Zadzwoń do mnie"	2004	*	Femme Fatale
"Sex appeal"	2005	*	Femme Fatale
"Samotni"	2005	*	Femme Fatale
"Tłum"	2005	*	Femme Fatale
"Świąteczna piosenka o miłości"	2006	*	Non-album single
"To tylko złudzenie (To nie miłość)"	2007	*	Daj mi chwilę
"Tu i tu"	2007	*	Daj mi chwilę
"Daj mi chwilę"	2007	*	Daj mi chwilę
"Wracam do domu"	2008	*	Daj mi chwilę
"Choć wieje, pada, grzmi" (featuring Borys Szyc)	2008	*	Daj mi chwilę
"Tajemnicze uczuć"	2008	*	Daj mi chwilę
"To mój czas"	2009	*	To mój czas
"Tango"	2009	*	To mój czas
"Proszę cię – skłam"	2009	*	To mój czas
"—" denotes a recording that did not chart or was not released in that territory. "*" denotes the chart did not exist at that time.

=== 2010s ===
Title	Year	Album
"Kim tu jestem"	2010	To mój czas
"Tylko ty znasz te zaklęcia"	2010	To mój czas
"Utwierdź mnie" (with Maciej Maleńczuk)	2011	Mezalianse
"Sanktuarium"	2011	XV
"Terra"	2014	Anima
"Kochankowie syreny"	2014	Anima
"High Heels" (featuring Pati Yang)	2015	Anima
"Kto wciska mi kit" (with Boban Marković)	2015	I na co mi to było?
"Ave (No control)"	2019	Maria Magdalena. All Is One

=== 2020s ===
Title	Year	Peak chart positions			Certifications	Album
Title	Year	POL Stream.	POL Billb.	LTU	Certifications	Album
"Miej odwagę"	2020	*		—		Szamanka
"Nie poddawaj się" (featuring Maciej Maleńczuk)	2021	*		—		Szamanka
"Dziewczyna Szamana" (featuring Leszek Możdżer)	2021	*		—		Szamanka
"Uciekinierzy" (featuring Arek Kłusowski)	2022	*	—	—		Szamanka
"Ra Ma Da Sa"	2022	*	—	—		Szamanka
"Nie mój sen" (featuring Luna)	2022	*	—	—		Szamanka
"Szamanka"	2022	*	—	—		Szamanka
"Między nami" (featuring Beata Kozidrak)	2022	*	—	—		Szamanka
"Now" (with Mike & Laurent)	2022	*	—	—		Non-album singles
"D.N.A"	2022	*	—	—		Non-album singles
"Poza ramą"	2022	*	—	—		Non-album singles
"Carpe Diem"	2023	—	—	—		Non-album singles
"Witch Tarohoro"	2023	—	—	—	ZPAV: Gold	Witch Tarohoro
"Nasz wspólny świat"	2024	—	—	—		Witch Tarohoro
"Ty lustrem świata"	2024	—	—	—		Witch Tarohoro
"Slavic"	2024	—	—	—		Witch Tarohoro
"Gaja"	2024	13	12	82	ZPAV: Platinum	Witch Tarohoro
"Każda fala znajdzie brzeg"	2025	—	—	—		Witch Tarohoro
"Nieznany raj"	2025	—	—	—		Witch Tarohoro
"—" denotes items which were not released in that country or failed to chart. "*" denotes the chart did not exist at that time.

== Awards and nominations ==
Year	Award	Category	Nominee(s)	Result	Ref.
1995	Fryderyki 1995	Song of the Year	"Dziewczyna Szamana"	Won	
1995	Fryderyki 1995	Video of the Year	"Dziewczyna Szamana"	Won	
1996	Fryderyki 1996	Album of the Year – Pop	"Dziewczyna Szamana"	Won	
1996	Fryderyki 1996	Song of the Year	"Oko za oko, słowo za słowo"	Won	
1996	Fryderyki 1996	Best Female Singer	Herself	Won	
1996	Fryderyki 1996	Debut of the Year	Herself	Won	
1996	Fryderyki 1996	Video of the Year	"Oko za oko, słowo za słowo"	Won	
1997	Fryderyki 1997	Album of the Year – Pop	"Naga"	Won	
1997	Fryderyki 1997	Best Female Singer	Herself	Won	
2002	Fryderyki 2002	Album of the Year – Ethnic/Folk	"Alkimja"	Won	
2013	OGAE Video Contest 2012	Video of the Year	"Sanktuarium"	Won	
2025	Eurovision Awards	Choreo Monarch	Herself	Won	

Awards and achievements
Preceded by Edyta Górniak with "To nie ja!"	Poland in the Eurovision Song Contest; 1995	Succeeded by Kasia Kowalska with "Chcę znać swój grzech..."
Preceded by Luna with "The Tower"	Poland in the Eurovision Song Contest; 2025	Succeeded by Alicja with "Pray"
