= Gaja (song) =

2024 single by Justyna Steczkowska

Single by Justyna Steczkowska

from the album Witch Tarohoro
- Language: Polish; English
- English title: "Gaia"
- Released: 28 November 2024
- Genre: Electro; pop; folk
- Length: 2:26; 3:00 (Eurovision edit)
- Label: JS Music; Royal Concert
- Composers: Dominic Buczkowski-Wojtaszek; Justyna Steczkowska; Patryk Kumór; Emilian Waluchowski
- Lyricists: Emilian Waluchowski; Justyna Steczkowska; Patryk Kumór
- Producers: Emilian Waluchowski; Hotel Torino; Jan Bielecki

Justyna Steczkowska singles chronology
"Slavic" (2024)	"Gaja" (2024)	"Każda fala znajdzie brzeg" (2025)

Music video
- "Gaja" on YouTube

Eurovision Song Contest 2025 entry
- Country: Poland
- Artist: Justyna Steczkowska
- Languages: Polish; English
- Composers: Dominic Buczkowski-Wojtaszek; Justyna Steczkowska; Patryk Kumór; Emilian Waluchowski
- Lyricists: Emilian Waluchowski; Justyna Steczkowska; Patryk Kumór

Finals performance
- Semi-final result: 7th
- Semi-final points: 85
- Final result: 14th
- Final points: 156

Entry chronology
- ◄ "The Tower" (2024)
- "Pray" (2026) ►

"Gaja" (Polish pronunciation: [gaja]; transl. Gaia) is a song by Polish singer and songwriter Justyna Steczkowska. It was written by Steczkowska and released on 28 November 2024 as the fifth single from her nineteenth studio album Witch Tarohoro. The song represented Poland in the Eurovision Song Contest 2025.

== Background and composition ==
The song was written and composed by Justyna Steczkowska, Patryk Kumór, Emilian Waluchowski and Dominic Buczkowski-Wojtaszek, with production handled by Waluchowski alongside Hotel Torino and Jan Bielecki. The song is named after Gaia, the personification of Earth in Greek mythology.

== Eurovision Song Contest ==
=== Wielki finał polskich kwalifikacji ===
Wielki finał polskich kwalifikacji was the national final format developed by Telewizja Polska (TVP) to select its entry for the Eurovision Song Contest 2025. On 14 January 2025, TVP published the list of participants of the Wielki finał polskich kwalifikacji, including "Gaja". Steczkowska had previously represented Poland in 1995.

The competition took place on 14 February 2025 at the TVP Headquarters in Warsaw. "Gaja" won the competition with 39.32%, becoming the Polish Eurovision entry for the 2025 contest.

=== At Eurovision ===
The Eurovision Song Contest 2025 took place at St. Jakobshalle in Basel, Switzerland, and consisted of two semi-finals held on the respective dates of 13 and 15 May and the final on 17 May 2025. During the allocation draw held on 28 January 2025, Poland was drawn to compete in the first semi-final, performing in the first half of the show. The song qualified for the Grand Final.

== Track listing ==
- Digital download
1. "Gaja" – 2:26
- Digital download - Eurovision edit
1. "Gaja" (Eurovision edit) – 3:00
- Digital download – remix
1. "Gaja" (Gromee remix) – 2:23

== Charts ==
Chart performance for "Gaja"
Chart (2025)	Peak position
Lithuania (AGATA)	82
Poland (Billboard)	12
Poland (Polish Streaming Top 100)	13

== Certifications ==
Certifications for "Gaja"
Region	Certification	Certified units/sales
Poland (ZPAV)	Platinum	125,000^{‡}
^{‡} Sales+streaming figures based on certification alone.
