= Krajowe Eliminacje =

Polish music competition

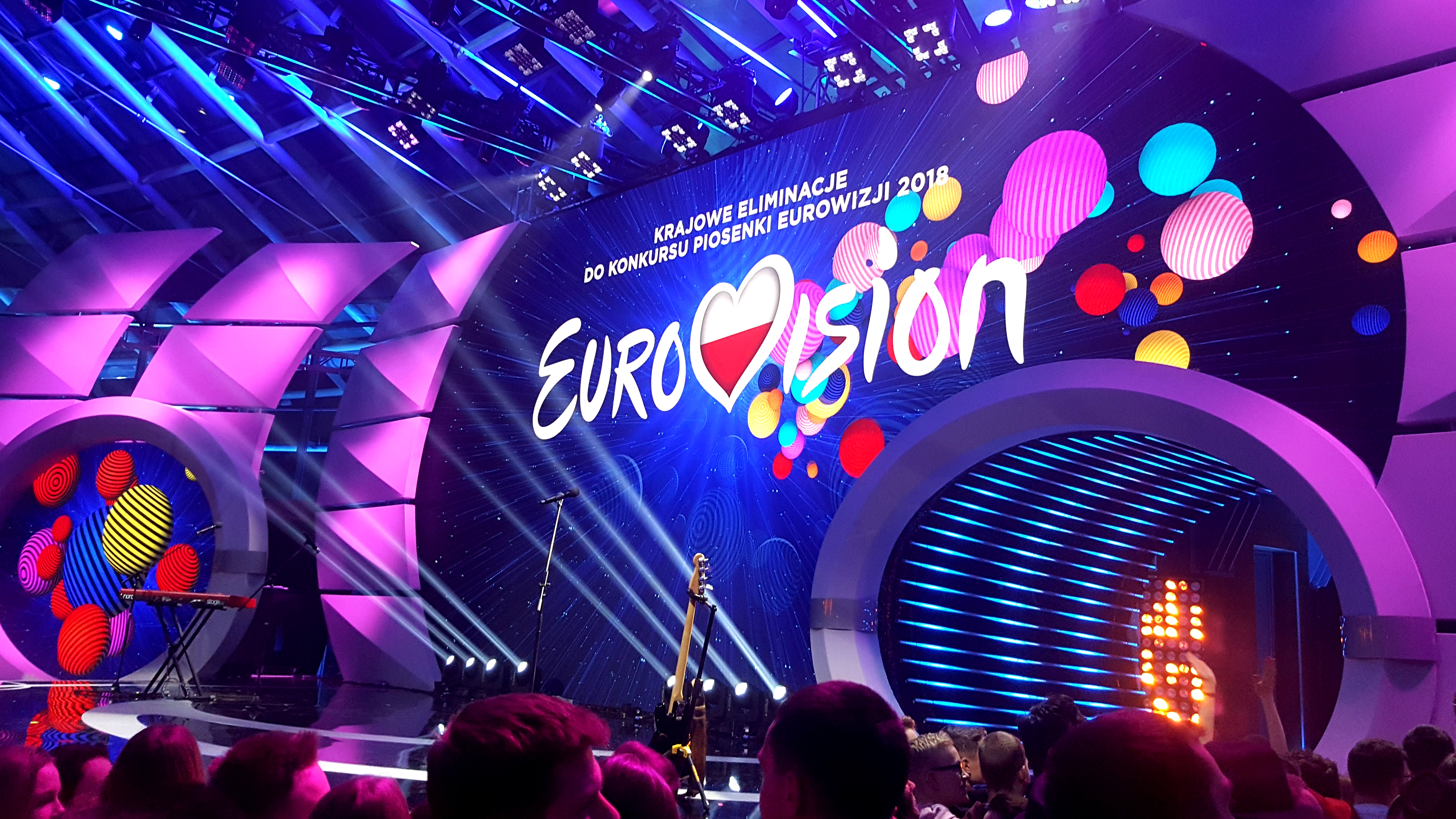
- Stage of Krajowe Eliminacje 2018
- Genre: Pop music, etc.
- Location: Poland
- Years active: 2010–2011; 2016–2018
- Founders: Telewizja Polska (TVP)

Krajowe Eliminacje ("National Qualification") show which was produced by Telewizja Polska (TVP) to select its entry in the Eurovision Song Contest. The first Krajowe Eliminacje was held in 2010. Between 2003 and 2004, the national selection was named Krajowe Eliminacje do Konkursu Piosenki Eurowizji and between 2006 and 2009 it was known as Piosenka dla Europy.

== History ==
=== 2010–2011 ===
In 2010, TVP decided to change the name of the Eurovision national final to Krajowe Eliminacje. By fans' involvement, Marcin Mroziński with his song "Legenda" got a wild card to the national final, which he ended up winning. At Eurovision he finished in 13th place in the semi-final and therefore failed to qualify for the final. In 2011, Krajowe Eliminacje was won by Magdalena Tul with her song "Jestem", however, Magdalena also did not qualify for the Eurovision final. After this, TVP decided that it would withdraw from the contest in 2012.

=== 2016–2018 ===
TVP's decision to withdraw in 2012 and 2013 caused controversy in Poland. As a result, the broadcaster made its return to the contest in 2014. However, unlike in the previous editions, the Polish representative was selected by an internal TVP commission (as has happened in the years 1994–2001 and 2005); the resulting lack of transparency was criticized. At the beginning of October 2015, TVP confirmed its participation in the 61st Eurovision Song Contest. Although the original representative of the country was to be selected internally by the station's management, on January 26, 2016 TVP1 director informed that the Polish representative will be selected through national final. Because of this, the Krajowe Eliminacje returned in 2016. Edyta Górniak and some of the biggest Polish music acts, such as Margaret, Natalia Szroeder and Michał Szpak, participated in the pre-selection, which was won by Szpak with his song "Color of Your Life". Szpak went on to finish in 8th place at Eurovision, giving Poland its third top 10 finish at the contest. In 2017, the interest for turned out to be smaller. Kasia Moś with her song "Flashlight" won the national selection in 2017, going on to finish in 22nd place at Eurovision. In 2018, Polish DJ Gromee and Swedish singer Lukas Meijer with the song "Light Me Up" won the selection, but failed to qualify for the Eurovision final, placing 14th in the semi-final. After this, TVP once again foregoes Krajowe Eliminacje in favor of an internal selection in 2019 and 2021, and the talent show Szansa na Sukces in 2020.

== List of winners ==
Year	Song	Artist	Songwriter(s)	Final	Points	Semi	Points
2010	"Legenda"	Marcin Mroziński	Marcin Nierubiec, Marcin Mroziński	Did not qualify		13	44
2011	"Jestem"	Magdalena Tul	Magdalena Tul	Did not qualify		19	18
2016	"Color of Your Life"	Michał Szpak	Andy Palmer, Kamil Varen	8	229	6	151
2017	"Flashlight"	Kasia Moś	Kasia Moś, Pete Baringger, Rickard Bonde Truumeel	22	64	9	119
2018	"Light Me Up"	Gromee feat. Lukas Meijer	Andrzej Gromala, Lukas Meijer, Mahan Moin, Christian Rabb	Did not qualify		14	81

== See also ==
- Poland in the Eurovision Song Contest
