= Kasia Moś =

Polish singer and dancer (born 1987)

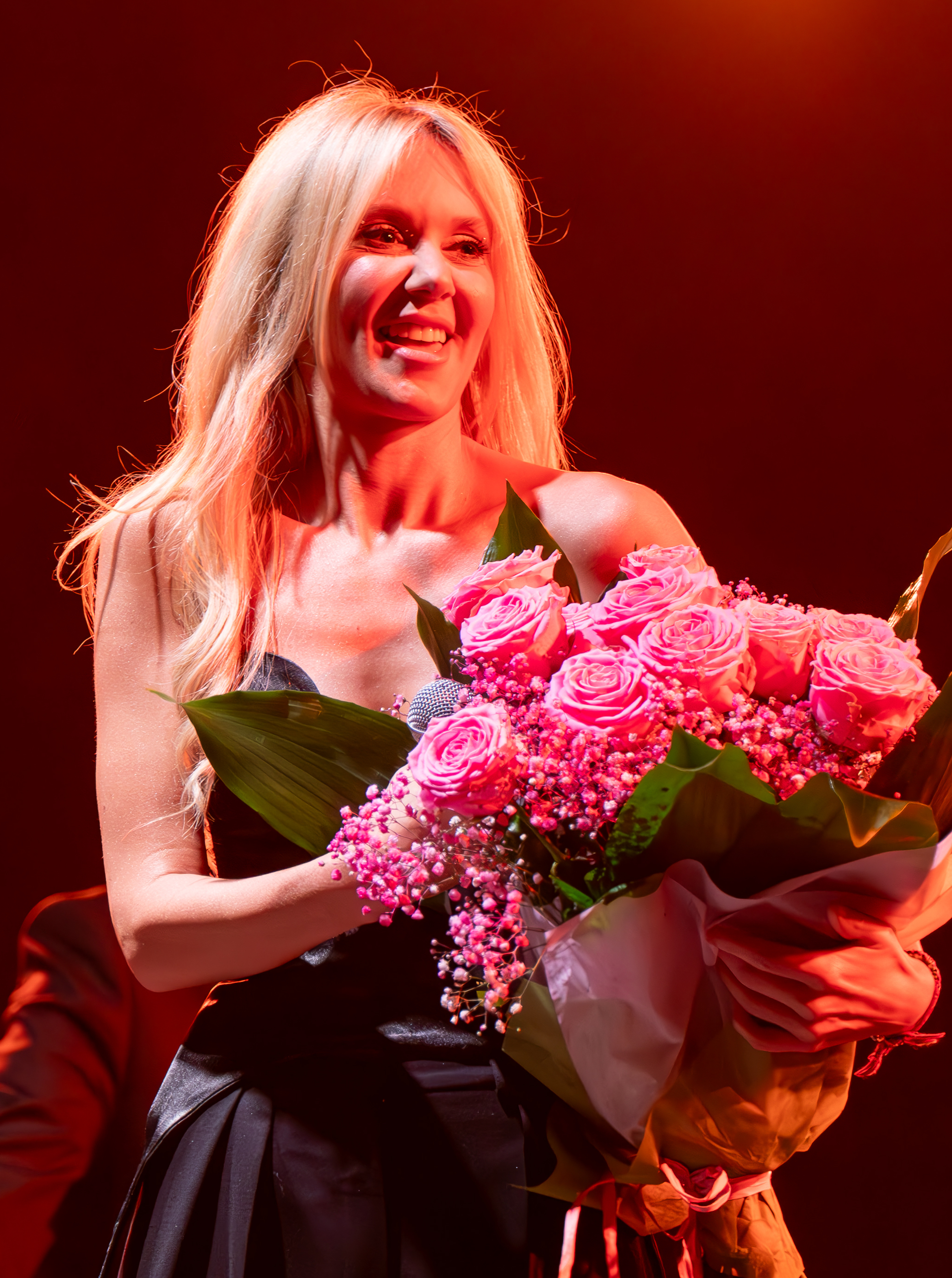
- Moś in 2024

Background information
- Also known as: Kasia Moss
- Born: Katarzyna Moś; 3 March 1987 (age 39); Ruda Śląska, Poland
- Origin: Bytom, Poland
- Genre: Pop
- Occupations: Singer; songwriter; dancer
- Instrument: Vocals
- Years active: 2002–present
- Label: Fonografika

Katarzyna "Kasia" Moś (Polish pronunciation: [kataˈʐɨna ˈkaɕa ˈmɔɕ]; born 3 March 1987) is a Polish singer, songwriter, and dancer. She was previously a member of The Pussycat Dolls Burlesque Revue in 2011, and in 2012, she came third in the third series of the Polish version of Must Be the Music. She represented Poland in the Eurovision Song Contest 2017 with the song "Flashlight", and finished in 22nd place.

== Life and career ==
=== Early life and education ===
Kasia is the daughter of Marek Moś, a part of the musical group Aukso. She is a graduate of the Frederic Chopin Music School in Bytom, where she studied cello and piano. She has a degree in jazz and contemporary music, graduating from Karol Szymanowski Vocal Academy of Music in Katowice. At age fifteen, Moś began to attend vocal classes by Elżbieta Chlebek, her first steps towards a professional singing career.

=== Music career ===
At the beginning of her musical career, Moś worked with ensembles such as, among others, Stetsons and Big Band Lotharsi, as well as with the group The Fire, which consisted of teachers and students of the jazz department at the Katowice Academy of Music.

In 2002, she recorded her first demo, which was written by, among others, Robert Janson, the founder of Varius Manx. In 2005, she released "I Wanna Know", which she performed in Piosenka dla Europy 2006, Poland's national final for the Eurovision Song Contest 2006. She finished in tenth place. From 2008 to 2009, she played the character of Judas in the play Pasja wg św. Marka by Paweł Mykietyn. The play was shown at, among others, the Wratislavia Cantans, the Polish Music Festival in Kraków and Warsaw Autumn.

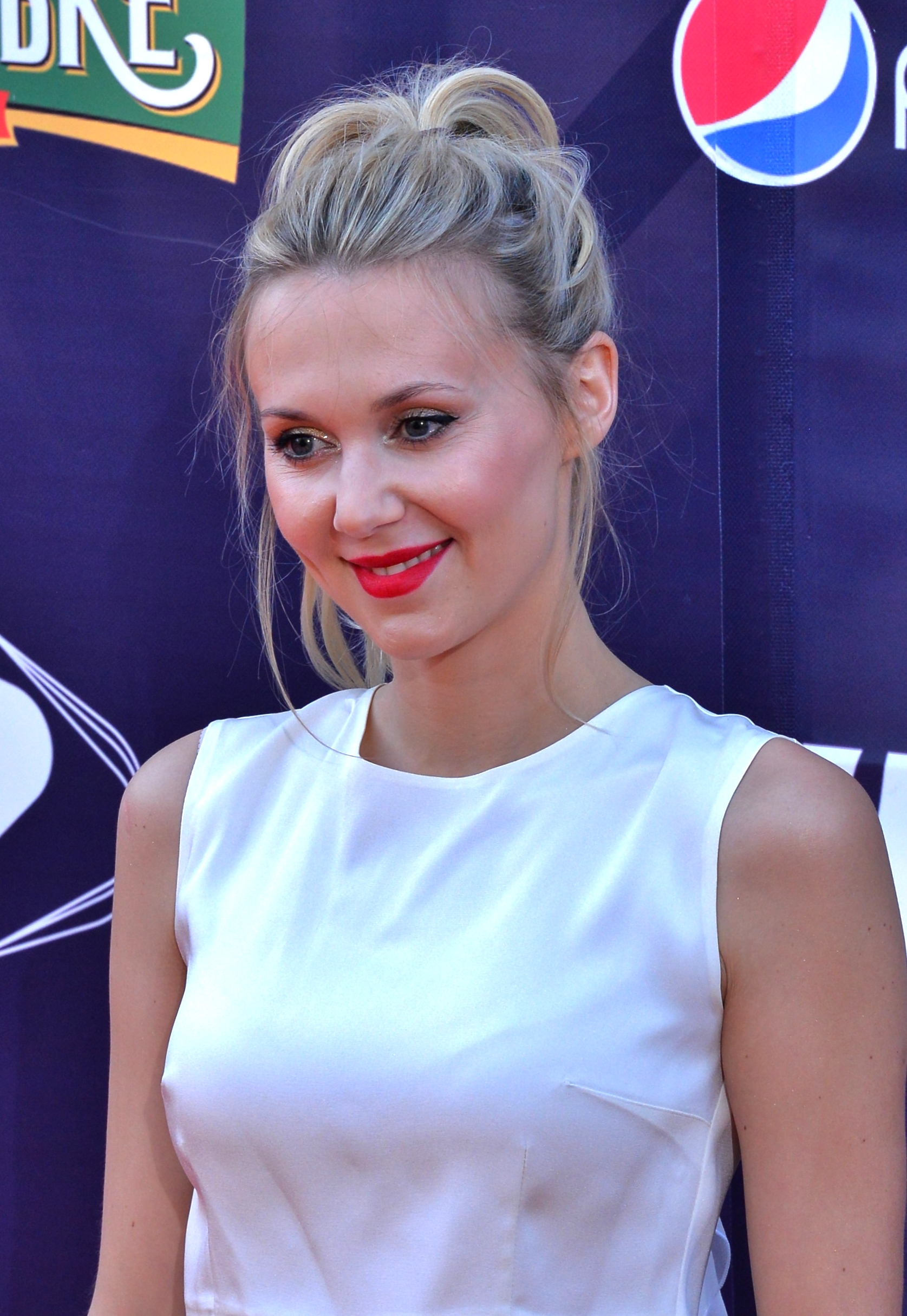
Kasia Moś during Eurovision Song Contest 2017 opening ceremony

In 2011, Moś traveled to Las Vegas, United States, where she met American producer Robin Antin, founder of the girl band The Pussycat Dolls. After returning to Poland, she recorded several demo songs and sent them to Antin. Later in the year, she traveled to the United States again, after being asked by Antin to join The Pussycat Dolls Burlesque Revue with which she performed at, among other places, the Viper Room. During the half-a-year contract, she collaborated with singers such as Kelly Osbourne, Mýa and Carmen Electra, and was invited by actress Eva Longoria to sign at a charity auction organised by her foundation.

In 2012, she auditioned for the third series of the Polish version of Must Be the Music. During her audition, she performed "(You Make Me Feel Like) A Natural Woman" by Aretha Franklin and advanced to the next round, eventually qualifying to the semi-finals. In the first semi-final she took part in, she sang "Czerwony jak cegła" by Dżem and qualified to the final, where she came third. During her time on the show, she collaborated with Tax Free on the song "Uwierz", which was included on the band's debut album, Na ostatnim piętrze nieba. The song was recorded to support the fight against dog abuse. In September, Moś played the role of Cordelia in the world premiere of the musical Król lear by Paweł Mykietyn.

In 2014, she became a spokesperson for Link4, an insurance company. In October 2015, she released her debut studio album Inspination. One of the singles from the album, "Addiction", qualified to Krajowe Eliminacje 2016, Poland's national final for the Eurovision Song Contest 2016. In the final, which took place on 5 March 2016, the song received 3.39% of the vote, and placed sixth. In the same year, Moś appeared on the cover of the October issue of Polish version of Playboy magazine.

In February 2017, she released "Flashlight", which will be included on her second studio album. The song qualified to Poland's national final for the Eurovision Song Contest 2017 and won. On 9 May, Moś performed in the first semi-final of the contest, placing 9th with 119 points and ultimately qualified to the final. The final took place on 13 May and the singer went on to place 22nd with 64 points.

She collaborated with Norma John to release "Wild Eyes".

== Discography ==
=== Studio albums ===
Title	Details	Peak chart positions
Title	Details	POL
Inspination	Released: 9 October 2015; Label: Fonografika; Format: CD, digital download, streaming	—
Moniuszko 200 (with AUKSO)	Released: 21 May 2021; Label: Polskie Radio; Format: CD, DVD, digital download, streaming	36
Karin Stanek	Released: 27 May 2022; Label: Polskie Radio; Format: CD, digital download, streaming	—
Wszystko to czego nie da się powiedzieć	Released: 15 November 2024; Label: Polskie Radio; Format: CD, LP, digital download, streaming	85
"—" denotes a recording that did not chart or was not released in that territory.

=== Other albums ===
Title	Details
Rzeczy. Vaudeville (with Aleksander Nowak, Marcin Wicha, Joanna Freszel, Karol Kozłowski, Max Mucha, Piotr Sałajczyk, AUKSO and Marek Moś)	Released: 4 October 2024; Label: PWM; Format: CD, digital download, streaming

=== Singles ===
Title	Year	Peak chart positions	Album
Title	Year	POL	Album
"I Wanna Know"	2006	—	Non-album single
"Uwierz" (with Tax Free)	2012	—	Na ostatnim piętrze nieba
"Zatracam się"	2014	—	Inspination
"Break"	2014	—	Non-album single
"Pryzmat"	2015	—	Inspination
"Addiction"	2016	—	Inspination
"Flashlight"	2017	55	Non-album single
"Wild Eyes" (featuring Norma John)	2018	—	Wszystko to czego nie da się powiedzieć
"Wait" (featuring Magda Adamiak)	2020	—	Non-album singles
"Ślad"	2020	—	Non-album singles
"Częściej" (with Happy Prince)	2021	—	Non-album singles
"Mimi"	2021	—	Wszystko to czego nie da się powiedzieć
"Dobre moce" (with Jarecki)	2021	—	Wszystko to czego nie da się powiedzieć
"Autostop"	2022	—	Karin Stanek
"Bezdźwięcznie"	2022	—	Wszystko to czego nie da się powiedzieć
"Tato kup mi dżinsy"	2022	—	Karin Stanek
"Femme Fatale" (featuring Jarecki, Mateusz Krautwurst and Waldemar Kasta)	2022	—	Wszystko to czego nie da się powiedzieć
"Zapomnij" (with Leszek Możdżer)	2022	—	Wszystko to czego nie da się powiedzieć
"Wierny wiatr"	2022	—	Karin Stanek
"Miód"	2023	—	Wszystko to czego nie da się powiedzieć
"Dziwna okolica" (with Marek Dyjak)	2023	—	Wszystko to czego nie da się powiedzieć
"Listek"	2024	—	Wszystko to czego nie da się powiedzieć
"Płynę" (featuring Wojtek Urbański and AUKSO)	2024	—	Wszystko to czego nie da się powiedzieć
"I Can't Say" (with Grzech Piotrowski)	2025	—	Non-album singles
"Alejandro"	2025	—	Non-album singles
"My" (with Bovska, Mateusz Krautwurst, Sławek Uniatowski, Magda Steczkowska, Olga Szomańska, Rafał Szatan i Kayah)	2025	—	Non-album singles
"Półprawda" (with Karolina Lyndo)	2026	—	Non-album singles
"Psiapsi"	2026	—	Non-album singles
"—" denotes a recording that did not chart or was not released in that territory.

=== As featured artist ===
Title	Year	Peak chart positions	Certifications	Album
Title	Year	POL	Certifications	Album
"Strych" (Bezimienni featuring Kasia Moś)	2008	—		Walka
"Prości ludzie" (Bezimienni featuring Juras and Kasia Moś)	2012	—		Co mnie nie zabije to mnie wzmocni
"Stare czasy" (Bezimienni featuring Kasia Moś)	2012	—		Co mnie nie zabije to mnie wzmocni
"Nie mam nic" (Ostry featuring Kasia Moś)	2014	—		Cztery wiosny
"Cztery wiosny" (Ostry featuring Kasia Moś)	2014	—		Cztery wiosny
"Pokonamy czas" (Marcin Spenner featuring Kasia Moś)	2016	—		Non-album single
"Rejs" (Ostry featuring Kasia Moś)	2018	—	ZPAV: Gold	Rysopis
"Gloria" (TGD featuring Kasia Cerekwicka, Kasia Moś, Kuba Badach and Mietek Szcześniak)	2018	59		Non-album single
"Schować pod skorupę" (Arkadio featuring Kasia Moś)	2020	—		Gdy nie widzi nikt
"Avoid the Water" (Piotr Steczek featuring Kasia Moś)	2022	—		Non-album single
"Za pierwszym razem" (Jarecki featuring Kasia Moś)	2023	—		Cukier i sól
"—" denotes a recording that did not chart or was not released in that territory.

=== Promotional singles ===
Title	Year	Album
"Przecież"	2018	Non-album singles
"#Hot16Challenge2"	2020	Non-album singles
"Dziś nie ma takiej wiosny" (Live; with AUKSO)	2020	Wszystko to czego nie da się powiedzieć
"Mizerna cicha" (Live)	2020	Non-album single
"Dlaczego tak się stało" (Live; with AUKSO)	2023	Karin Stanek
"Zapomnij" (Live; with AUKSO)	2023	Wszystko to czego nie da się powiedzieć

== Krajowe Eliminacje ==
=== Entries in Eurovision Song Contest Pre-Selections ===
Year	Country	Song	Result	Songwriters
2006	Poland	"I Wanna Know"	10th	Robert Janson
2016	Poland	"Addiction"	6th	Kasia Moś, Mateusz Moś, Paweł Olszówka
2017	Poland	"Flashlight"	1st	Kasia Moś, Pete Baringger, Rickard Bonde Truumeel

Awards and achievements
Preceded by Michał Szpak with "Color of Your Life"	Poland in the Eurovision Song Contest; 2017	Succeeded by Gromee feat. Lukas Meijer with "Light Me Up"
