= Poland in the Eurovision Song Contest 2017 =

- Eurovision Song Contest 2017
- Participating broadcaster: Telewizja Polska (TVP)
- Country: Poland
- Selection process: Krajowe Eliminacje 2017
- Selection date: 18 February 2017

Competing entry
- Song: "Flashlight"
- Artist: Kasia Moś
- Songwriters: Kasia Moś; Pete Baringger; Rickard Bonde Truumeel

Placement
- Semi-final result: Qualified (9th, 119 points)
- Final result: 22nd, 64 points

Participation chronology

Poland was represented at the Eurovision Song Contest 2017 with the song "Flashlight" written by Kasia Moś, Pete Baringger and Rickard Bonde Truumeel. The song was performed by Kasia Moś. The Polish broadcaster Telewizja Polska (TVP) organised the national final Krajowe Eliminacje 2017 in order to select the Polish entry for the 2017 contest in Kyiv, Ukraine. The national final took place on 18 February 2017 and featured ten entries. "Flashlight" performed by Kasia Moś was selected as the winner after gaining the most points following the combination of votes from a five-member jury panel and a public vote.

Poland was drawn to compete in the first semi-final of the Eurovision Song Contest which took place on 9 May 2017. Performing during the show in position 11, "Flashlight" was announced among the top 10 entries of the first semi-final and therefore qualified to compete in the final on 13 May. It was later revealed that Poland placed ninth out of the 18 participating countries in the semi-final with 119 points. In the final, Poland performed in position 2 and placed twenty-second out of the 26 participating countries, scoring 64 points.

== Background ==
Prior to the 2017 contest, Poland had participated in the Eurovision Song Contest nineteen times since its first entry in 1994. Poland's highest placement in the contest, to this point, has been second place, which the nation achieved with its debut entry in 1994 with the song "To nie ja!" performed by Edyta Górniak. Poland has only, thus far, reached the top ten on two other occasions, when Ich Troje performing the song "Keine Grenzen – Żadnych granic" finished seventh in 2003, and when Michał Szpak performing the song "Color of Your Life" finished eighth in 2016. Between 2005 and 2011, Poland failed to qualify from the semi-final round six out of seven years with only their 2008 entry, "For Life" performed by Isis Gee, managing to take the nation to the final during that period. After once again failing to qualify to the final in 2011, the country withdrew from the contest during 2012 and 2013. Since returning to the contest in 2014, Poland managed to qualify to the final each year.

The Polish national broadcaster, Telewizja Polska (TVP), broadcasts the event within Poland and organises the selection process for the nation's entry. TVP confirmed Poland's participation in the 2017 Eurovision Song Contest on 12 September 2016. Between 2006 and 2011, TVP organised televised national finals that featured a competition among several artists and songs in order to select the Polish entry for the Eurovision Song Contest. After returning to the contest in 2014 following their two-year absence, the broadcaster opted to internally select both the 2014 and 2015 entries but returned to select their 2016 entry via a national final, a selection procedure that continued for their 2017 entry.

== Before Eurovision ==
=== Krajowe Eliminacje 2017 ===
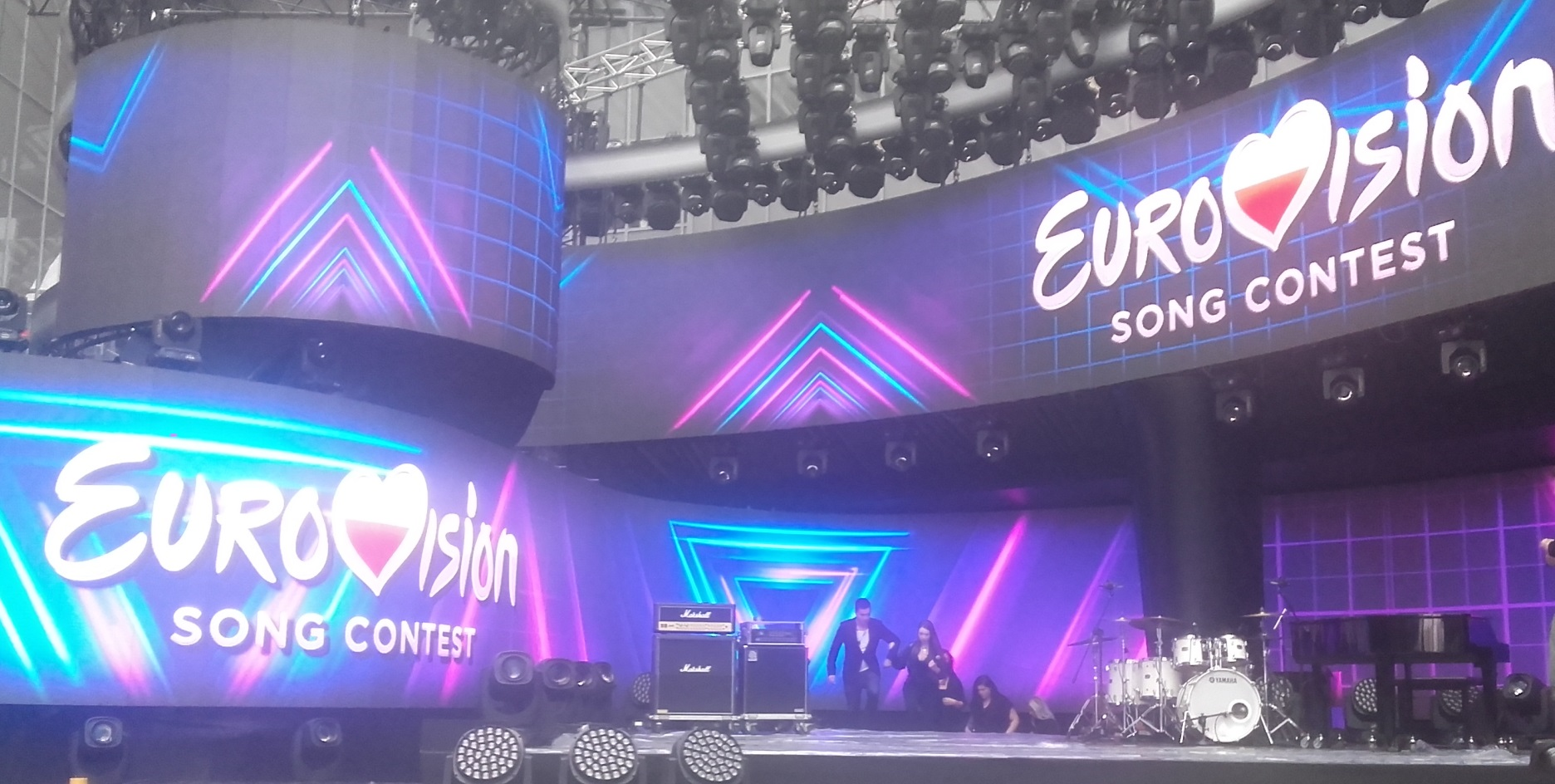
The stage of Krajowe Eliminacje 2017

Krajowe Eliminacje 2017 was the national final organised by TVP in order to select the Polish entry for the Eurovision Song Contest 2017. The show took place on 18 February 2017 at the TVP Headquarters in Warsaw, hosted by Artur Orzech. A combination of public televoting and jury voting selected the winner. The show was broadcast on TVP1 and TVP Polonia as well as streamed online at the broadcaster's website eurowizja.tvp.pl. The national final was watched by 2.5 million viewers in Poland with a market share of 17%.

==== Competing entries ====
TVP opened a submission period for interested artists and songwriters to submit their entries between 27 December 2016 and 10 February 2017. The broadcaster received 150 submissions at the closing of the deadline. A six-member selection committee selected nine entries from the received submissions to compete in the national final. The selection committee consisted of Grzegorz Brzozowicz (journalist), Artur Orzech (Eurovision commentator, radio and television journalist and presenter), Konrad Smuga (director), Maciej Stanecki (Vice President of TVP), Mateusz Grzesiński (Polish Head of Delegation for the Eurovision Song Contest) and Ewa Nowicka (Head of TVP1). The selected entries were announced on 11 February 2017. Among the competing artists was Martin Fitch (Marcin Mroziński), who represented Poland in the Eurovision Song Contest in 2010. The competing artists were required to submit a promotional video for their song to TVP by 26 February 2017.

Artist	Song	Songwriter(s)
Agata Nizińska	"Reason"	Allan Rich, Jud Friedman, Marcin Kindla
Aneta Sablik	"Ulalala"	Aneta Sablik, Kevin Zuber, Maciej Puchalski, Heavynn Gates
Carmell	"Faces"	Małgorzata Bernatowicz, Marcin Kurczarski, Paweł Jurczak
Isabell Otrębus	"Voiceless"	David Kreuger, Fredrik Kempe
Kasia Moś	"Flashlight"	Kasia Moś, Pete Baringger, Rickard Bonde Truumeel
Lanberry	"Only Human"	Małgorzata Uściłowska, Piotr Siejka, Sarah Reeve
Martin Fitch	"Fight for Us"	Marcin Mroziński, Sean Kennedy
Olaf Bressa	"You Look Good"	Ashley Hicklin, Rufus Hamsen, Farchard Samadzada
Paulla	"Chcę tam z tobą być"	Michał Kacprzak
Rafał Brzozowski	"Sky Over Europe"	Marcin Dutkiewicz, Marcin Kindla

==== Final ====
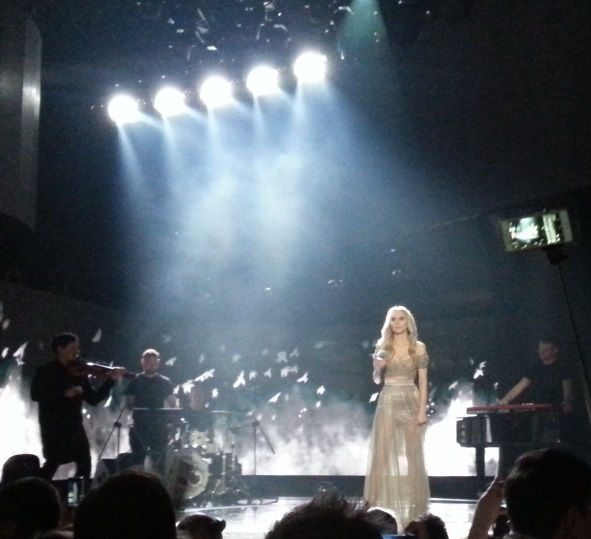
Kasia Moś performing during a rehearsal for Krajowe Eliminacje 2017

The televised final took place on 18 February 2017. Ten entries competed and the winner, "Flashlight" performed by Kasia Moś, was determined by a 50/50 combination of votes from a five-member professional jury and a public vote. The jury consisted of Maria Sadowska (singer), Robert Janowski (singer, composer, TV host and actor), Alicja Węgorzewska (opera singer), Włodek Pawlik (musician) and Krzesimir Dębski (conductor of the Polish entry in 1997). In addition to the performances of the competing entries, 2016 Polish Junior Eurovision entrant Olivia Wieczorek opened the show with her Junior Eurovision song "Nie zapomnij", while singer Doda and 2016 Polish Eurovision entrant Michał Szpak performed as the interval acts.

Final – 18 February 2017
R/O	Artist	Song	Jury	Televote	Total	Place
1	Martin Fitch	"Fight for Us"	6	2	8	7
2	Lanberry	"Only Human"	3	5	8	6
3	Isabell Otrębus	"Voiceless"	9	6	15	4
4	Paulla	"Chcę tam z tobą być"	4	3	7	8
5	Olaf Bressa	"You Look Good"	1	1	2	10
6	Kasia Moś	"Flashlight"	10	9	19	1
7	Aneta Sablik	"Ulalala"	2	4	6	9
8	Rafał Brzozowski	"Sky Over Europe"	8	8	16	2
9	Carmell	"Faces"	5	10	15	3
10	Agata Nizińska	"Reason"	7	7	14	5

Detailed jury votes
R/O	Song	M. Sadowska	R. Janowski	A. Węgorzewska	W. Pawlik	K. Dębski	Total	Points
1	"Fight for Us"	7	4	6	7	5	29	6
2	"Only Human"	2	3	5	6	1	17	3
3	"Voiceless"	9	8	9	9	9	44	9
4	"Chcę tam z Tobą być"	4	5	4	5	4	22	4
5	"You Look Good"	1	2	1	4	2	10	1
6	"Flashlight"	10	10	10	10	10	50	10
7	"Ulalala"	3	3	2	1	3	12	2
8	"Sky Over Europe"	5	7	8	8	7	35	8
9	"Faces"	8	6	3	2	8	27	5
10	"Reason"	6	9	7	3	6	31	7

=== Promotion ===
Kasia Moś made several appearances across Europe to specifically promote "Flashlight" as the Polish Eurovision entry. On 25 March, Moś performed during the Eurovision PreParty Riga, which was organised by OGAE Latvia and held at the Cristal Club in Riga, Latvia. On 2 April, she performed during the London Eurovision Party, which was held at the Café de Paris venue in London, United Kingdom and hosted by Nicki French. Between 3 and 6 April, Kasia Moś took part in promotional activities in Tel Aviv, Israel where she performed during the Israel Calling event held at the Ha'teatron venue. On 8 April, Moś performed during the Eurovision in Concert event which was held at the Melkweg venue in Amsterdam, Netherlands and hosted by Cornald Maas and Selma Björnsdóttir. On 15 April, she performed during the Eurovision Spain Pre-Party, which was held at the Sala La Riviera venue in Madrid, Spain.

== At Eurovision ==
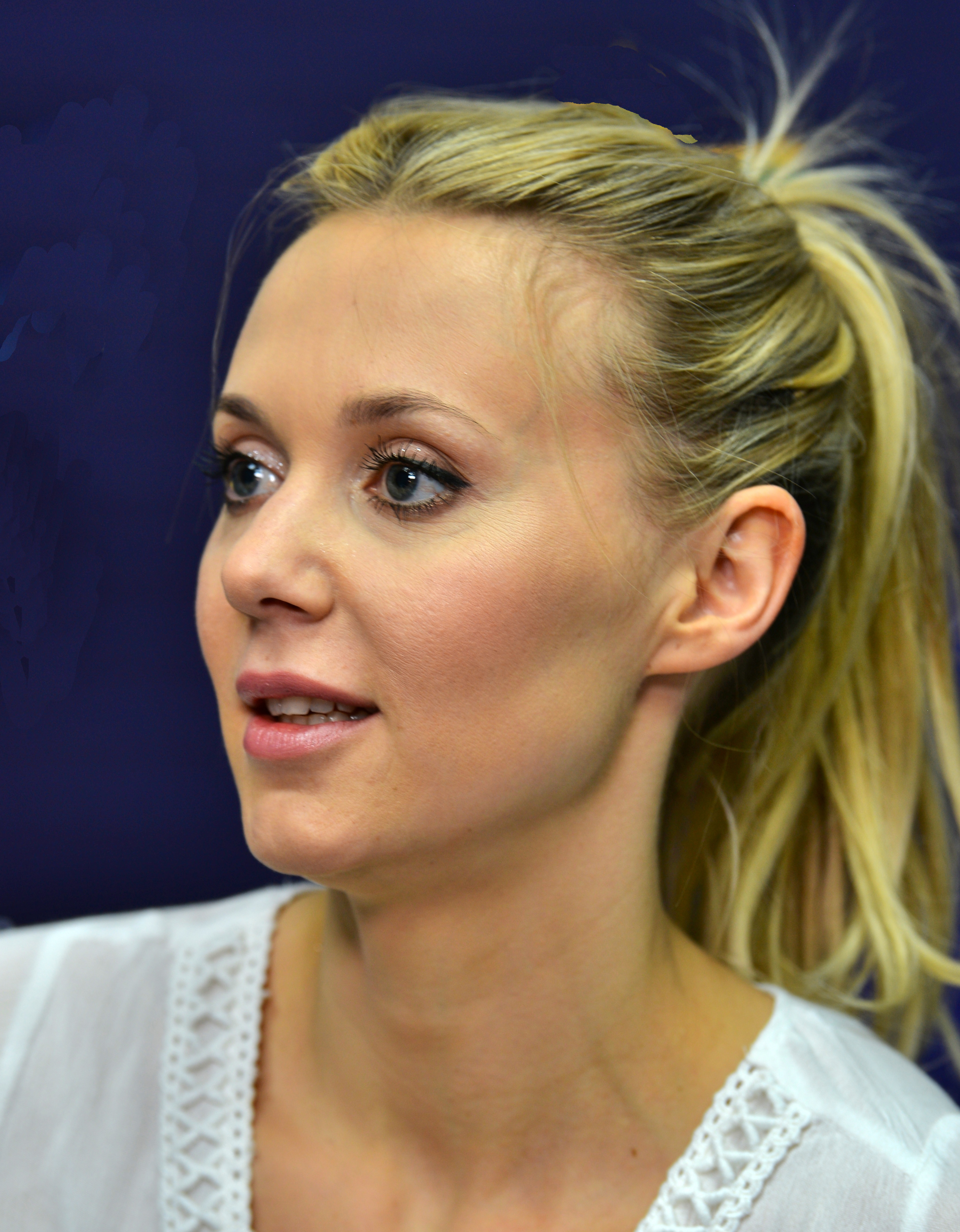
Kasia Moś during a press meet and greet

According to Eurovision rules, all nations with the exceptions of the host country and the "Big Five" (France, Germany, Italy, Spain and the United Kingdom) are required to qualify from one of two semi-finals in order to compete for the final; the top ten countries from each semi-final progress to the final. The European Broadcasting Union (EBU) split up the competing countries into six different pots based on voting patterns from previous contests, with countries with favourable voting histories put into the same pot. On 31 January 2017, a special allocation draw was held which placed each country into one of the two semi-finals, as well as which half of the show they would perform in. Poland was placed into the first semi-final, to be held on 9 May 2017, and was scheduled to perform in the second half of the show.

Once all the competing songs for the 2017 contest had been released, the running order for the semi-finals was decided by the shows' producers rather than through another draw, so that similar songs were not placed next to each other. Poland was set to perform in position 11, following the entry from Greece and before the entry from Moldova.

The two semi-finals and the final were broadcast in Poland on TVP1 and TVP Polonia with commentary by Artur Orzech. The three shows also aired on a one-day delay on TVP Rozrywka. The Polish spokesperson, who announced the top 12-point score awarded by the Polish jury during the final, was Anna Popek.

=== Semi-final ===
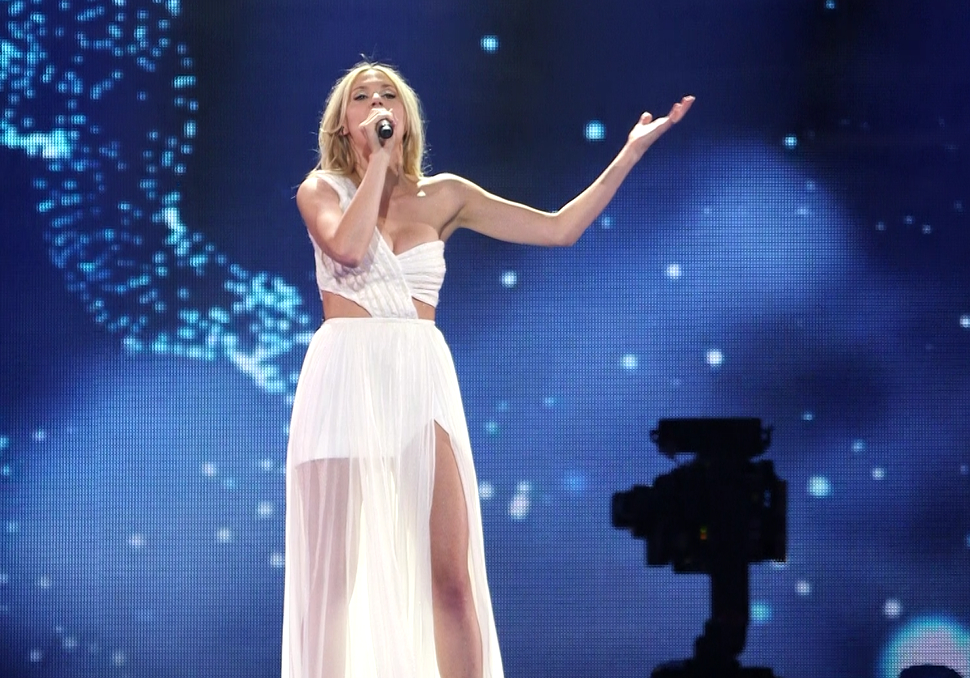
Kasia Moś during a rehearsal before the first semi-final

Kasia Moś took part in technical rehearsals on 30 April and 4 May, followed by dress rehearsals on 8 and 9 May. This included the jury show on 8 May where the professional juries of each country watched and voted on the competing entries.

The Polish performance featured Kasia Moś performing in a white dress designed by designer Mario Menezi, joined by a violinist dressed in black. The stage was predominately in blue colours with the LED floor and screens displaying a cloudy sky that transitioned into a constellation of stars that form the word "Freedom" in various languages, as well as images of birds, dolphins and horses. In regards to the staging, the director for the Polish performance, Konrad Smuga, stated: "Kasia fights for animal rights and this is the main message of this song. I hope it is very legible and clear. Her vocal power does not require any great setting, she herself fills the stage with her expression, so we tried not to spoil it, but also to convey the thought that we agreed at the first meeting that this is what we wanted in this song." The violinist that joined Moś on stage was her brother Mateusz Moś.

At the end of the show, Poland was announced as having finished in the top 10 and subsequently qualifying for the grand final. It was later revealed that Poland placed ninth in the semi-final, receiving a total of 119 points: 69 points from the televoting and 50 points from the juries.

=== Final ===
Shortly after the first semi-final, a winners' press conference was held for the ten qualifying countries. As part of this press conference, the qualifying artists took part in a draw to determine which half of the grand final they would subsequently participate in. This draw was done in the reverse order the countries appeared in the semi-final running order. Poland was drawn to compete in the first half. Following this draw, the shows' producers decided upon the running order of the final, as they had done for the semi-finals. Poland was subsequently placed to perform in position 2, following the entry from Israel and before the entry from Belarus.

Kasia Moś once again took part in dress rehearsals on 12 and 13 May before the final, including the jury final where the professional juries cast their final votes before the live show. Kasia Moś performed a repeat of her semi-final performance during the final on 13 May. Poland placed twenty-second in the final, scoring 64 points: 41 points from the televoting and 23 points from the juries.

=== Voting ===
Voting during the three shows involved each country awarding two sets of points from 1-8, 10 and 12: one from their professional jury and the other from televoting. Each nation's jury consisted of five music industry professionals who are citizens of the country they represent, with their names published before the contest to ensure transparency. This jury judged each entry based on: vocal capacity; the stage performance; the song's composition and originality; and the overall impression by the act. In addition, no member of a national jury was permitted to be related in any way to any of the competing acts in such a way that they cannot vote impartially and independently. The individual rankings of each jury member as well as the nation's televoting results were released shortly after the grand final.

Below is a breakdown of points awarded to Poland and awarded by Poland in the first semi-final and grand final of the contest, and the breakdown of the jury voting and televoting conducted during the two shows:

==== Points awarded to Poland ====
Points awarded to Poland (Semi-final 1)
Score	Televote	Jury
12 points	United Kingdom	Australia
10 points		
8 points	Belgium; Czech Republic; Italy	Czech Republic
7 points		
6 points	Sweden	United Kingdom
5 points	Iceland	
4 points		Belgium; Slovenia
3 points	Cyprus; Georgia; Latvia; Moldova; Spain	Azerbaijan; Latvia
2 points	Albania; Armenia; Greece	Albania; Armenia; Cyprus; Finland
1 point	Azerbaijan	Moldova; Portugal

Points awarded to Poland (Final)
Score	Televote	Jury
12 points		
10 points	United Kingdom	
8 points		
7 points	Ireland	Bulgaria
6 points		Azerbaijan
5 points	Sweden	
4 points	Belgium	Slovenia
3 points	Iceland; Italy; Norway	
2 points	Austria; Germany	Australia; Belarus
1 point	France; Netherlands	Czech Republic; San Marino

==== Points awarded by Poland ====
Points awarded by Poland (Semi-final 1)
Score	Televote	Jury
12 points	Portugal	Portugal
10 points	Moldova	Georgia
8 points	Belgium	Australia
7 points	Cyprus	Belgium
6 points	Armenia	Armenia
5 points	Sweden	Slovenia
4 points	Finland	Sweden
3 points	Slovenia	Czech Republic
2 points	Greece	Greece
1 point	Iceland	Finland

Points awarded by Poland (Final)
Score	Televote	Jury
12 points	Belgium	Portugal
10 points	Portugal	Belgium
8 points	Bulgaria	Netherlands
7 points	Romania	Australia
6 points	Moldova	Bulgaria
5 points	Hungary	United Kingdom
4 points	Belarus	Sweden
3 points	Sweden	Norway
2 points	Ukraine	Armenia
1 point	Croatia	Azerbaijan

==== Detailed voting results ====
The following members comprised the Polish jury:

- Piotr Iwicki (jury chairperson) – Polish Radio Music Agency CEO, Head of Polish Radio Orchestra
- Grzegorz Urban – composer, arranger, pianist
- Magda Steczkowska – singer
- Marek Dutkiewicz – lyricist
- Magdalena Tul – singer, represented Poland in the 2011 contest

Detailed voting results from Poland (Semi-final 1)
R/O	Country	Jury							Televote	
R/O	Country	G. Urban	M. Steczkowska	P. Iwicki	M. Dutkiewicz	M. Tul	Rank	Points	Rank	Points
01	Sweden	16	9	7	9	3	7	4	6	5
02	Georgia	5	1	1	6	1	2	10	16	
03	Australia	1	3	9	3	4	3	8	13	
04	Albania	13	16	15	10	15	15		17	
05	Belgium	9	4	3	1	9	4	7	3	8
06	Montenegro	15	17	17	16	17	17		14	
07	Finland	4	11	10	11	11	10	1	7	4
08	Azerbaijan	6	6	11	12	14	11		12	
09	Portugal	2	2	4	2	2	1	12	1	12
10	Greece	11	10	2	14	10	9	2	9	2
11	Poland									
12	Moldova	17	7	13	4	12	13		2	10
13	Iceland	7	13	12	13	8	14		10	1
14	Czech Republic	12	5	14	7	7	8	3	11	
15	Cyprus	8	15	8	8	13	12		4	7
16	Armenia	3	12	5	5	6	5	6	5	6
17	Slovenia	10	8	6	15	5	6	5	8	3
18	Latvia	14	14	16	17	16	16		15	

Detailed voting results from Poland (Final)
R/O	Country	Jury							Televote	
R/O	Country	G. Urban	M. Steczkowska	P. Iwicki	M. Dutkiewicz	M. Tul	Rank	Points	Rank	Points
01	Israel	20	19	23	16	10	19		20	
02	Poland									
03	Belarus	13	15	21	9	24	17		7	4
04	Austria	15	13	16	15	6	13		22	
05	Armenia	11	11	10	6	7	9	2	17	
06	Netherlands	6	2	5	11	1	3	8	19	
07	Moldova	16	12	12	4	15	12		5	6
08	Hungary	14	21	13	18	17	18		6	5
09	Italy	21	23	14	19	25	22		11	
10	Denmark	4	10	20	20	3	11		24	
11	Portugal	1	1	1	3	4	1	12	2	10
12	Azerbaijan	10	8	6	10	11	10	1	15	
13	Croatia	23	20	25	21	12	21		10	1
14	Australia	3	4	9	2	8	4	7	16	
15	Greece	24	22	24	23	20	24		18	
16	Spain	25	25	18	24	22	25		25	
17	Norway	5	9	7	5	18	8	3	12	
18	United Kingdom	9	7	2	12	9	6	5	21	
19	Cyprus	22	24	22	22	21	23		14	
20	Romania	18	16	15	14	16	16		4	7
21	Germany	12	18	17	8	23	15		23	
22	Ukraine	19	6	19	25	19	20		9	2
23	Belgium	7	3	3	1	5	2	10	1	12
24	Sweden	8	14	4	13	2	7	4	8	3
25	Bulgaria	2	5	11	7	13	5	6	3	8
26	France	17	17	8	17	14	14		13	
