= Staraoke =

Finnish children's television game show

- Genre: Karaoke
- Based on: Staraoke's PC game
- Directed by: Juha Stenholm (Finnish version); Sue McMahon (Cartoon Network version)
- Presented by: Kana
- Composers: Pat Gribben and Cormac O'Kane (Cartoon Network version)
- Country of origin: Finland
- Original language: Finnish
- No. of seasons: 10 (Finnish version); 1 (Cartoon Network version)
- No. of episodes: 100 (Finnish version); 78 (13 for every CN European version)

Production
- Executive producers: Finn Arnesen (for Turner Entertainment); John A. Marley (for Archie Productions)
- Producers: Lotta Perander (Finnish version); Amanda Browning (Cartoon Network version)
- Production locations: Helsinki (Finnish version); London (Cartoon Network version)
- Running time: 23 minutes
- Production companies: Intervisio; Archie Productions

Original release
- Network: MTV3; MTV3 Juniori; MTV; Cartoon Network; Minimax
- Release: 2003 – 2011

Staraoke is a Finnish children's game show based on karaoke, which aired on Boomerang in Europe. The show was created by Intervisio and was broadcast on MTV3 and MTV3 Juniori from 2003 to 2011. In 2008, Staraoke won an International Interactive Emmy Award for Best Interactive Programming, the first Finnish show to win an Emmy.

The show consists of contestants, aged 8 to 13, who use their voice to maneuver a game character. Singing in tune allows the character to stay on track, resulting in a higher score, while singing off-key causes the character to stumble, resulting in fewer points.

The show's format began to be sold in Europe in 2006. The first two countries to create their own Staraoke versions were Hungary and Sweden, airing on Minimax and MTV, respectively. In 2009, the show was also sold to England, Germany, France, Italy, Spain, and Poland through the Cartoon Network.

A Staraoke game for iPhone and iPad was published in 2010.

== Staraoke in Europe ==
Country	TV channel	Host(s)	Release year
Finland	MTV3 and MTV Juniori	Kana	2003–2011
France	Cartoon Network (France)	Angie Doll and Mathieu Boldron	2009
Germany	Cartoon Network (Germany)	Bahar Kizil and Jan Köppen	2009
Hungary	Minimax	Patrícia Virág and Noémi Virág	2006–2007
Italy	Cartoon Network (Italy)	Carolina Benvenga and Andrea Dianetti	2009
Poland	Cartoon Network (Poland)	Zosia Zborowska and Marcin Mroziński	2009
Spain	Cartoon Network (Spain)	Vicky Gómez (credited as "Vicky Alonso"), and Alex Montero	2009
Sweden	MTV	Malin Gramer	2006–2008
United Kingdom	Cartoon Network UK	Laura Hamilton and Nigel Clarke	2009
