= Kana (rapper) =

Finnish rapper

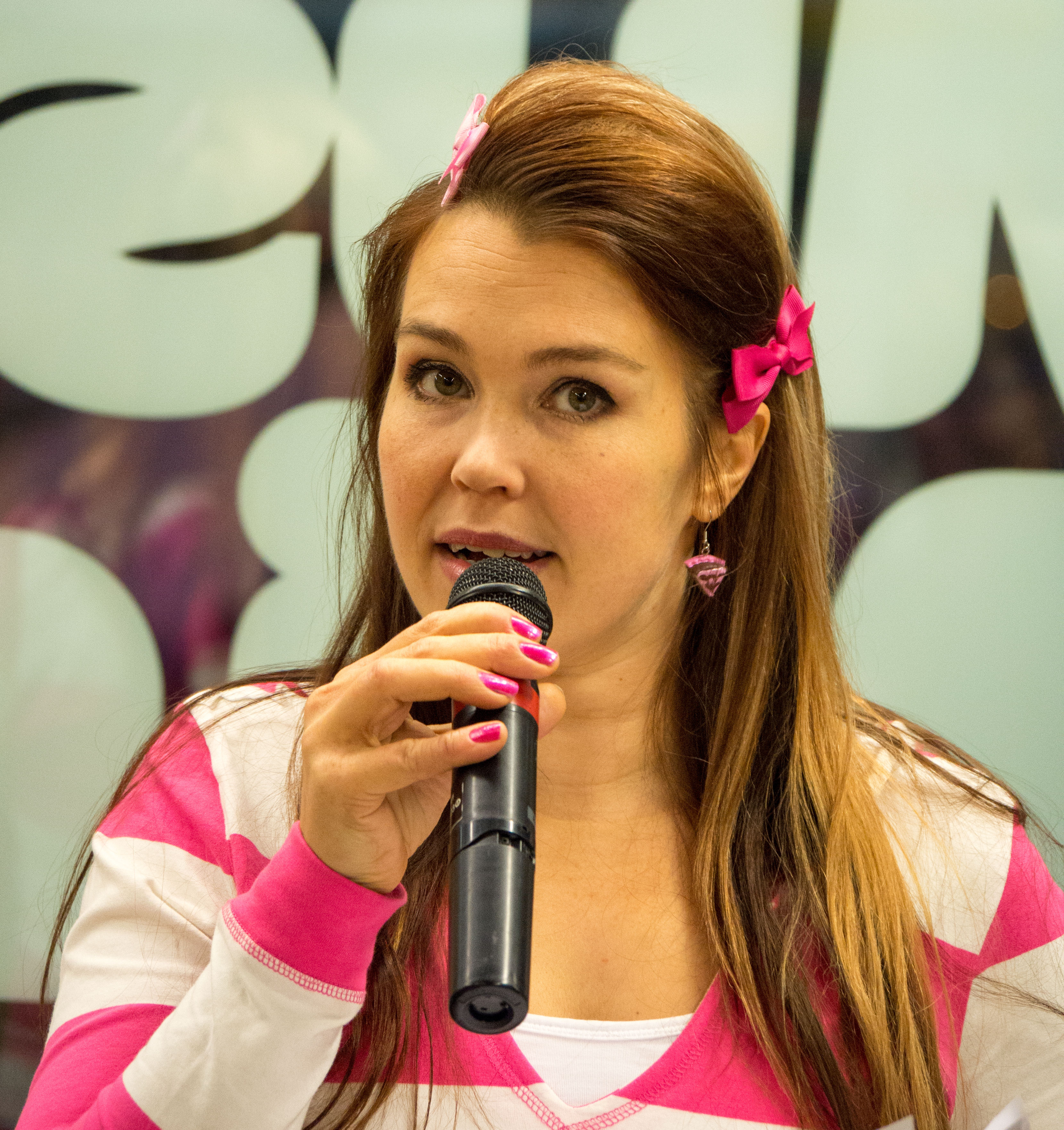
Kana in 2012

Kana (born Marianna Elisabeth Alanen) is a Finnish rap musician. She began her music career on the Finnish TV show Popstars, a contest for new pop musicians. After the show ended, Kana embarked upon a solo career.

She had her own radio show Kanalasta kajahtaa on YLE YleX channel in 2003. The show featured mainly rap and R&B Music. In the same year, she started hosting children's singing and talent game shows Skabadabaduu and Staraoke on MTV3. Staraoke won the first Interactive Emmy Award for a Finnish show in Cannes in 2008.

In 2005, she released singles from her second album.

The name "Kana" means "chicken" in Finnish but is also a nickname for a slightly ditzy woman, as is intended in this case. At the start of her career she took the name "Phat Zik", which was fennicized as "Kana" when she started rapping in Finnish. Her real name comes from ballerina Marianna Rumjantseva.

== Discography ==
=== Albums ===
- wRAP (2003)
- Tulen aina takaisin (2007)

=== Singles ===
- Kontti Norjaan (Container to Norway) (2003)
- Sanamainari/Sydän ja pää (Wordminer/Heart and Head) feat. Afrodite (2003)
- Sähkövirtaa (2005 - gold)
- Tulen aina takaisin (promo - 2005)
- Saan kaiken muuttumaan (promo - 2006)
