= Poland in the Eurovision Song Contest =

- Eurovision Song Contest
- Participating broadcaster: Telewizja Polska (TVP)

Participation summary
- Appearances: 28 (18 finals)
- First appearance: 1994
- Highest placement: 2nd: 1994
- Participation history: 1994; 1995; 1996; 1997; 1998; 1999; 2000; 2001; 2002; 2003; 2004; 2005; 2006; 2007; 2008; 2009; 2010; 2011; 2012; 2013; 2014; 2015; 2016; 2017; 2018; 2019; ~~2020~~; 2021; 2022; 2023; 2024; 2025; 2026

Related articles
- Krajowe Eliminacje; Szansa na sukces

External links
- TVP page
- Poland's page at Eurovision.com
- For the most recent participation see Poland in the Eurovision Song Contest 2026

Poland has been represented at the Eurovision Song Contest 28 times since its debut in 1994. The Polish participating broadcaster in the contest is Telewizja Polska (TVP).

Poland's debut in the contest in 1994 remains its most successful entry, with "To nie ja!" by Edyta Górniak finishing second. This remains Poland's only top five result in the contest. The country reached the top ten for the second time with Ich Troje finishing seventh in 2003. Poland then failed to qualify from the semi-finals in six out of seven years between 2005 and 2011, before withdrawing from the contest in 2012. Since returning in 2014, Poland had qualified for the final for four consecutive years (2014–2017), achieving a third top ten finish in 2016, with Michał Szpak finishing eighth. The country failed to qualify three contests in a row (2018, 2019, and 2021), a streak that ended with Ochman finishing 12th in 2022. Poland qualified then successfully again in 2023 although the country failed again in 2024. Poland qualified to the final in 2025 and 2026.

== Participation ==
Telewizja Polska (TVP) has been a full member of the European Broadcasting Union (EBU) since 1st January 1993, thus eligible to participate in the Eurovision Song Contest since then. It has participated in the contest representing Poland since the 39th edition in 1994. Before becoming a member of the EBU, earlier contests had often been broadcast on TVP.

== History ==
=== 1993–2000 ===
TVP first ever entrant was at the 1994 contest: "To nie ja!" by Edyta Górniak is also by far the most successful Polish entry to date, receiving 166 points and placing second. Poland was almost disqualified that year though; there was no free-language rule in operation at the time, and a furor erupted at the dress rehearsal when Górniak sung the second half of "To nie ja!" in English. Six national delegations formally petitioned for Poland to be disqualified; however Eurovision rules required a majority of delegations (13 in this case) to complain before the European Broadcasting Union could examine the case for disqualification, so Poland was allowed to remain.

The Polish entry for the 1995 contest was again selected through internal selection. It was "Sama" by Justyna Steczkowska. Steczkowska could not replicate Górniak's 2nd place, receiving only 15 points and placing 18th out of 23.

During the competition in 1996, a qualifying round was organized with the aim of reducing the number of countries participating in the final of the competition. The qualifying stage was not televised or recorded, and national juries audited the studio versions of all competition proposals and awarded them points. Out of 29 works sent by public broadcasters, 22 entries qualified for the finals. The only country not participating in the qualifying round was the competition host, Norway. The 1996 entry was Kasia Kowalska with "Chcę znać swój grzech...". She qualified to the final and placed 15th with 31 points.

Poland competed in the 1997 competition with the song "Ale jestem", the first uptempo Polish entry, which was performed by Anna Maria Jopek. At the close of voting, she had received 54 points, placing 11th in a field of 25.

In 1998 Poland was represented by band Sixteen. They performed the song "To takie proste" in the final of the competition, finishing 17th of 25 entrants, receiving 19 points.

In 1999 Mietek Szcześniak represented Poland with the song "Przytul mnie mocno". He was the first male singer who represented Poland. He placed 18th with 17 points. Due to the low results over previous five years, Poland did not participate in the Eurovision Song Contest 2000.

=== 2001–2011 ===
Poland returned to the 2001 contest following an enforced one-year absence. However, after they placed 20th out of 23, they were relegated again from the Eurovision Song Contest 2002. They did however return in 2003.

For the 2003 contest Poland organized its first public selection for Eurovision entry; Ich Troje and some of the biggest Polish music acts, such as Wilki, Blue Café and Varius Manx, participated in the pre-selection, it was no surprise when the group Ich Troje won the public vote ahead of Blue Café, placing 7th of 26 countries in the final. This placing allowed Poland to skip the semi-final of the 2004 contest, automatically qualifying for the final.

The Polish entry for the 2004 contest was again selected through National Final, the Krajowe Eliminacje. The winner was Blue Café with "Love Song". Group could not repeat Ich Troje's 7th place, receiving only 27 points and placing 17th.

In 2005 TVP went back to an internal selection, picking "Czarna dziewczyna", a multilingual song performed in Polish and Russian. Poland competed at the semi-final for the first time. The song just missed out on a place in the final, coming 11th in the semi-final with 81 points, only 4 points behind Latvia.

Poland's 2006 entry was chosen with the comeback of the public vote on TVP. Ich Troje were chosen again in 2006 with song "Follow My Heart", but could not repeat their 7th place from 2003. They failed to qualify for the final, coming 11th with 70 points in the semi-final only 6 points behind Macedonia. Poland's 2007 entry, "Time To Party", sung by The Jet Set, only finished 14th in the semi-final.

Poland's only appearance in the final between 2005 and 2011, was in 2008. Even then, its song ("For Life", sung by Isis Gee) only qualified as a jury wildcard and placed a lowly 24th in the final, ahead of only the United Kingdom.

In the 2009, Poland selected Lidia Kopania and her song "I Don't Wanna Leave". She performed in the second semi-final on 14 May 2009, however she failed to qualify, finishing 12th with 43 points.

The 2010 entry for Poland was Marcin Mroziński with song "Legenda". He performed in the first semi-final on 25 May 2010 but he didn't qualify for the final, finishing 13th with 44 points.

In 2011, Poland was represented by Magdalena Tul, and the country's entry was sung in Polish. Her song was called "Jestem", translated as "I am". Although initially a favorite with bookmakers, "Jestem" failed to qualify, finishing last 19th with 18 points in the first semi-final. This remains the worst Polish result to date.

Members of the Polish OGAE have said at their annual convention that they would like Edyta Górniak to represent Poland for a second time. For years, it was unknown if Górniak would enter Eurovision again, until 2016, when she made a second attempt at representing her country in the contest, placing third in the national final.

=== 2012–2013 absence ===
In December 2011, it was announced that Poland will not compete at the Eurovision Song Contest 2012 in Baku. The Polish broadcaster stated that having to organize the European Football Championship 2012 (hosted by Poland and Ukraine) was a major factor in their non-participation. TVP informed esctoday.com that their decision to abstain would not hamper their chances of returning in 2013. However, Poland confirmed on 22 November 2012 that they would not be participating in 2013.

=== 2014–present: ===
TVP, the Polish national broadcaster has confirmed on 5 December 2013 that Poland will return to the Eurovision Song Contest in 2014. The country has participated every year since.

On 25 February, it was announced that Donatan and Cleo would represent Poland with their song "My Słowianie". They qualified for the final placing 8th with 70 points, making it only the second time Poland has qualified for the final since 2008. Donatan and Cleo performed 9th in the final and ended up placing 14th out of 26, with 62 points. The duo fared clearly better with the televoters, finishing third in the semi-final and 5th in the final respectively.

In 2015 TVP has selected their entry internally again by choosing Monika Kuszyńska and her song "In the Name of Love". She was the first ever Eurovision participant to sit in a wheelchair during her performance, due to the fact that she was paralyzed after being involved in a serious car accident in 2006. Kuszyńska performed last in the second semi-final on 21 May 2015 and qualified for the final placing 8th with 57 points. In the final, she came 23rd out of 27 acts, receiving ten points. Alike Donatan and Cleo, she fared clearly better with the televoters, coming fourth in the semi-final and 15th in the final respectively.

At the beginning of October 2015, TVP confirmed its participation in the 61st Eurovision Song Contest. Although the original representative of the country was to be selected internally by the station's management, on January 26, 2016, TVP1 director informed that the Polish representative will be selected through a national final. Because of this, the Krajowe Eliminacje returned in 2016. Edyta Górniak and some of the biggest Polish music acts, such as Margaret and Natalia Szroeder, took part in the competition, with Michał Szpak winning it. Szpak performed second in the second semi-final on 12 May 2016, and qualified for the final by finishing in sixth place, with 151 points. In the final, held on 14 May 2016, he performed 12th and placed 8th out of 26 acts, with 229 points, which gave Poland their third best result ever.

In 2017, TVP decided to host the second edition of the national final, the interest for turned out to be smaller. Kasia Moś and her song "Flashlight" was announced as a winner. Moś performed 11th in the first semi-final on 9 May 2017. She qualified for the final placing 9th with 119 points. In the final, held on 13 May 2017, she performed 2nd and came 22nd out of 26 acts with 64 points total.

Poland's run of qualifications came to an end in 2018, when the song "Light Me Up" by Polish DJ Gromee and Swedish vocalist Lukas Meijer, again chosen during the national final, failed to qualify to the final by placing 14th with 81 points in the second semi-final. It is the first Polish entry since its return to the contest in 2014, not to qualify for the final.

In 2019, TVP returned to an internal selection, after a successful internal choice of Roksana Węgiel who won the Junior Eurovision Song Contest 2018. On 15 February 2019, it was announced that TVP has chosen Tulia to represent Poland in Tel Aviv. However, Poland failed to qualify for the grand final by placing 11th with 120 points in the first semi-final, finishing only 2 points behind Belarus.

In 2020, TVP used the talent show Szansa na Sukces to select the Polish artist and song, having used the show to select the song "Superhero" performed by Viki Gabor for the Junior Eurovision Song Contest 2019, which went on to win. Alicja Szemplińska won the national final with the song "Empires", winning both the public and the jury vote. However, the 2020 contest was later cancelled due to the COVID-19 pandemic.

In 2021, TVP used an internal selection. On 12 March 2021 during the TVP2 programme Pytanie na śniadanie it was announced that Rafał Brzozowski would represent the country with the song "The Ride". Poland failed to qualify for the final, placing 14th with 35 points in the second semi-final.

In 2022, TVP used the national final Tu bije serce Europy! Wybieramy hit na Eurowizję to select its entry. The national final was held on 19 February 2022, with 10 entries competing, and was won by Ochman with "River". Ochman performed 14th in the second semi-final on 12 May 2022. He qualified for the final placing 6th with 198 points. In the final, held on 14 May 2022, he performed 23rd, where he placed 12th with 151 points, despite being one of the favourites to win the competition.

In 2023, Tu bije serce Europy! Wybieramy hit na Eurowizję was again used to select the Polish entry. The national final took place on 26 February 2023, where Blanka won with the song "Solo". Her victory was met with a negative reception among Polish media and Eurovision fans. Blanka presented herself for the first time during the second semi-final of the competition on 11 May and qualified for the final from third place after scoring 124 points. In the final, she performed fourth and she finished in 19th place with 93 points.

In 2024, TVP reverted to an internal selection process. On 19 February it was announced that Luna would represent Poland with "The Tower". She performed sixth in the first semi-final on 7 May, failing to qualify, and ultimately finishing 12th with 35 points.

In 2025, TVP organised the national final Wielki finał polskich kwalifikacji to select its entry. Justyna Steczkowska won the national final with "Gaja", and went on to make her second Eurovision appearance 30 years after her first entry in 1995. She performed second in the first semi-final on 13 May and placed seventh with 85 points, qualifying her to the final, where she finished 14th with 156 points.

In 2026, TVP once again organised the national final with planned Eurovision 2020 representative Alicja and her song "Pray" being chosen and ended up qualifying for the final from 2nd place with 247 points, the best result for Poland in a semi-final to date. In the final, she finished 12th with 150 points.

== Participation overview ==
Table key
2	Second place
3	Third place
◁	Last place
◇	Entry selected but did not compete
†	Upcoming event

Year	Artist	Song	Language	Final	Points	Semi	Points
1994	Edyta Górniak	"To nie ja!"	Polish	2	166	No semi-finals	
1995	Justyna	"Sama"	Polish	18	15	No semi-finals	
1996	Kasia Kowalska	"Chcę znać swój grzech"	Polish	15	31	15	42
1997	Anna Maria Jopek	"Ale jestem"	Polish	11	54	No semi-finals	
1998	Sixteen	"To takie proste"	Polish	17	19	No semi-finals	
1999	Mietek Szcześniak	"Przytul mnie mocno"	Polish	18	17	No semi-finals	
2001	Piasek	"2 Long"	English	20	11	No semi-finals	
2003	Ich Troje	"Keine Grenzen – Żadnych granic"	German, Polish, Russian	7	90	No semi-finals	
2004	Blue Café	"Love Song"	English, Spanish	17	27	Top 11 in 2003 contest (Note: According to the then-Eurovision rules, the top ten non-Big Four countries from the previous year along with the Big Four automatically qualified for the Grand Final without having to compete in semi-finals. For example, if Germany and France placed inside the top ten, the 11th and 12th spots were advanced to next year's Grand Final along with all countries ranked in the top ten.)	
2005	Ivan and Delfin	"Czarna dziewczyna"	Polish, Russian	Failed to qualify		11	81
2006	Ich Troje (Note: Performance contains uncredited live vocals from O-Jay)	"Follow My Heart"	English, Polish, German, Russian	Failed to qualify		11	70
2007	The Jet Set	"Time to Party"	English	Failed to qualify		14	75
2008	Isis Gee	"For Life"	English	24	14	10	42
2009	Lidia Kopania	"I Don't Wanna Leave"	English	Failed to qualify		12	43
2010	Marcin Mroziński	"Legenda"	English, Polish	Failed to qualify		13	44
2011	Magdalena Tul	"Jestem"	Polish	Failed to qualify		19 ◁	18
2014	Donatan and Cleo	"My Słowianie – We Are Slavic"	Polish, English	14	62	8	70
2015	Monika Kuszyńska	"In the Name of Love"	English	23	10	8	57
2016	Michał Szpak	"Color of Your Life"	English	8	229	6	151
2017	Kasia Moś	"Flashlight"	English	22	64	9	119
2018	Gromee feat. Lukas Meijer	"Light Me Up"	English	Failed to qualify		14	81
2019	Tulia	"Fire of Love (Pali się)"	Polish, English	Failed to qualify		11	120
2020	Alicja ◇	"Empires" ◇	English ◇	Contest cancelled (Note: The 2020 contest was cancelled due to the COVID-19 pandemic.)			
2021	Rafał Brzozowski	"The Ride"	English	Failed to qualify		14	35
2022	Ochman	"River"	English	12	151	6	198
2023	Blanka	"Solo"	English	19	93	3	124
2024	Luna	"The Tower"	English	Failed to qualify		12	35
2025	Justyna Steczkowska	"Gaja"	Polish, English	14	156	7	85
2026	Alicja	"Pray"	English	12	150	2	247
2027	Confirmed intention to participate †						

== Awards ==
=== Barbara Dex Award ===
Year	Performer	Host city	Ref.
2001	Piasek	(Denmark) Copenhagen	

== Related involvement ==
=== Conductors ===
Their first two entries were conducted by Noel Kelehan. In 1996 the conductor was Wiesław Pieregorólka, in 1997 - Krzesimir Dębski and 1998 - Pieregorólka again.

=== Heads of delegation ===
Year	Head of delegation	Ref.
2010–2011	Maria Makowska	
2014–2015	Mikołaj Dobrowolski	
2017	Mateusz Grzesiński	
2019–2020	Marta Piekarska	
2021–2023	Maja Frybes	
2024	Marta Piekarska	
2025–2027	Tomasz Sołowiński	

=== Commentators and spokespersons ===
The contest was also aired on Polish radio stations, on PR1 in 1974 and on Polskie Radio Bis in 1996–1997.

Year	Channel	Commentator	Spokesperson	Ref.
1965	TV Polska	Unknown	Did not participate	
1966	TV Polska	Unknown	Did not participate	
1967	TV Polska	Unknown	Did not participate	
1968	Telewizja Polska	Unknown	Did not participate	
1969	No broadcast		Did not participate	
1970	Telewizja Polska	Unknown	Did not participate	
1971	Telewizja Polska	Unknown	Did not participate	
1972	No broadcast		Did not participate	
1973	No broadcast		Did not participate	
1974	Telewizja Polska	Unknown	Did not participate	
1975	TP1	Unknown	Did not participate	
1976	TP1	Unknown	Did not participate	
1977	TP1	Unknown	Did not participate	
1978	TP1	Unknown	Did not participate	
1979	No broadcast		Did not participate	
1980	No broadcast		Did not participate	
1981	TP1	Unknown	Did not participate	
1982	TP1	Unknown	Did not participate	
1983	TP1	Unknown	Did not participate	
1984	TP1	Unknown	Did not participate	
1985	TP1	Unknown	Did not participate	
1986	TP1	Unknown	Did not participate	
1987	TP1	Unknown	Did not participate	
1988	TP1	Unknown	Did not participate	
1989	TP1	Unknown	Did not participate	
1990	TP1	Unknown	Did not participate	
1991	TP1	Unknown	Did not participate	
1992	TVP1	Artur Orzech and Maria Szabłowska	Did not participate	
1993	TVP1	Artur Orzech and Maria Szabłowska	Did not participate	
1994	TVP1	Artur Orzech	Jan Chojnacki	
1995	TVP1	Artur Orzech	Jan Chojnacki	
1996	TVP1	Dorota Osman	Jan Chojnacki	
1997	TVP1	Jan Wilkans	Jan Chojnacki	
1998	TVP1	Artur Orzech	Jan Chojnacki	
1999	TVP1	Artur Orzech	Jan Chojnacki	
2000	TVP1	Artur Orzech	Did not participate	
2001	TVP1	Artur Orzech	Maciej Orłoś	
2002	TVP1	Artur Orzech	Did not participate	
2003	TVP1	Artur Orzech	Maciej Orłoś	
2004	TVP1	Artur Orzech	Maciej Orłoś	
2005	TVP1	Artur Orzech	Maciej Orłoś	
2006	TVP1, TVP Polonia	Artur Orzech	Maciej Orłoś	
2007	TVP1	Artur Orzech	Maciej Orłoś	
2008	TVP1, TVP Polonia (SF1, Final)	Artur Orzech	Radosław Brzózka	
2009	TVP1 (SF2, Final)	Artur Orzech	Radosław Brzózka	
2010	TVP1	Artur Orzech	Aleksandra Rosiak	
2011	TVP1	Artur Orzech	Odeta Moro-Figurska	
2012–2013	No broadcast		Did not participate	
2014	TVP1, TVP1 HD, TVP Polonia, TVP Rozrywka	Artur Orzech	Paulina Chylewska	
2015	TVP1, TVP1 HD, TVP Polonia, TVP Rozrywka	Artur Orzech	Aleksandra Ciupa	
2016	TVP1, TVP1 HD, TVP Polonia, TVP Rozrywka	Artur Orzech	Anna Popek	
2017	TVP1, TVP Polonia, TVP Rozrywka, TVP HD	Artur Orzech	Anna Popek	
2018	TVP1, TVP Polonia	Artur Orzech	Mateusz Szymkowiak	
2019	TVP1, TVP Polonia	Artur Orzech	Mateusz Szymkowiak	
~~2020~~	Not announced before cancellation			
2021	TVP1, TVP Polonia	Marek Sierocki and Aleksander Sikora	Ida Nowakowska	
2022	TVP1, TVP Polonia	Marek Sierocki and Aleksander Sikora	Ida Nowakowska	
2023	TVP1, TVP Polonia	Marek Sierocki and Aleksander Sikora	Ida Nowakowska	
2024	TVP1, TVP Polonia	Artur Orzech	Viki Gabor	
2025	TVP1, TVP Polonia	Artur Orzech	Aleksandra Budka	
2026	TVP1, TVP Polonia	Artur Orzech	Aleksandra Budka	

=== Stage directors ===
Year	Stage director	Ref.
2009	Bolesław Pawica	
2010	Dariusz Lewandowski	
2014	Mikołaj Dobrowolski	
2015	Mikołaj Dobrowolski	
2017	Konrad Smuga	
2018	Konrad Smuga	
2019	Konrad Smuga	
2021	Mikołaj Dobrowolski	
2022	Mikołaj Dobrowolski and Tomasz Klimek	
2023	Mikołaj Dobrowolski	
2024	Jerry Reeve	

== Photo gallery ==
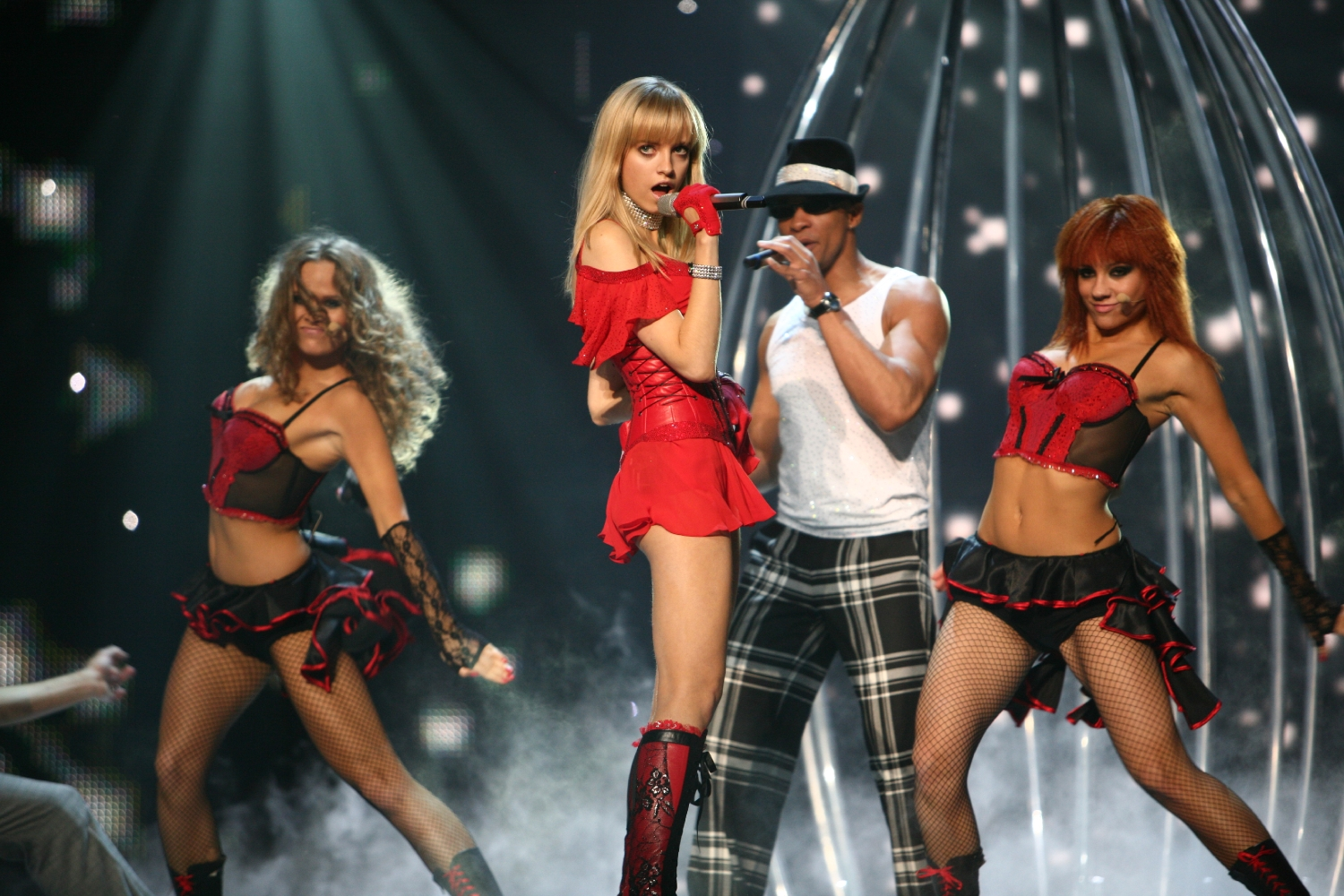
The Jet Set in Helsinki (2007)

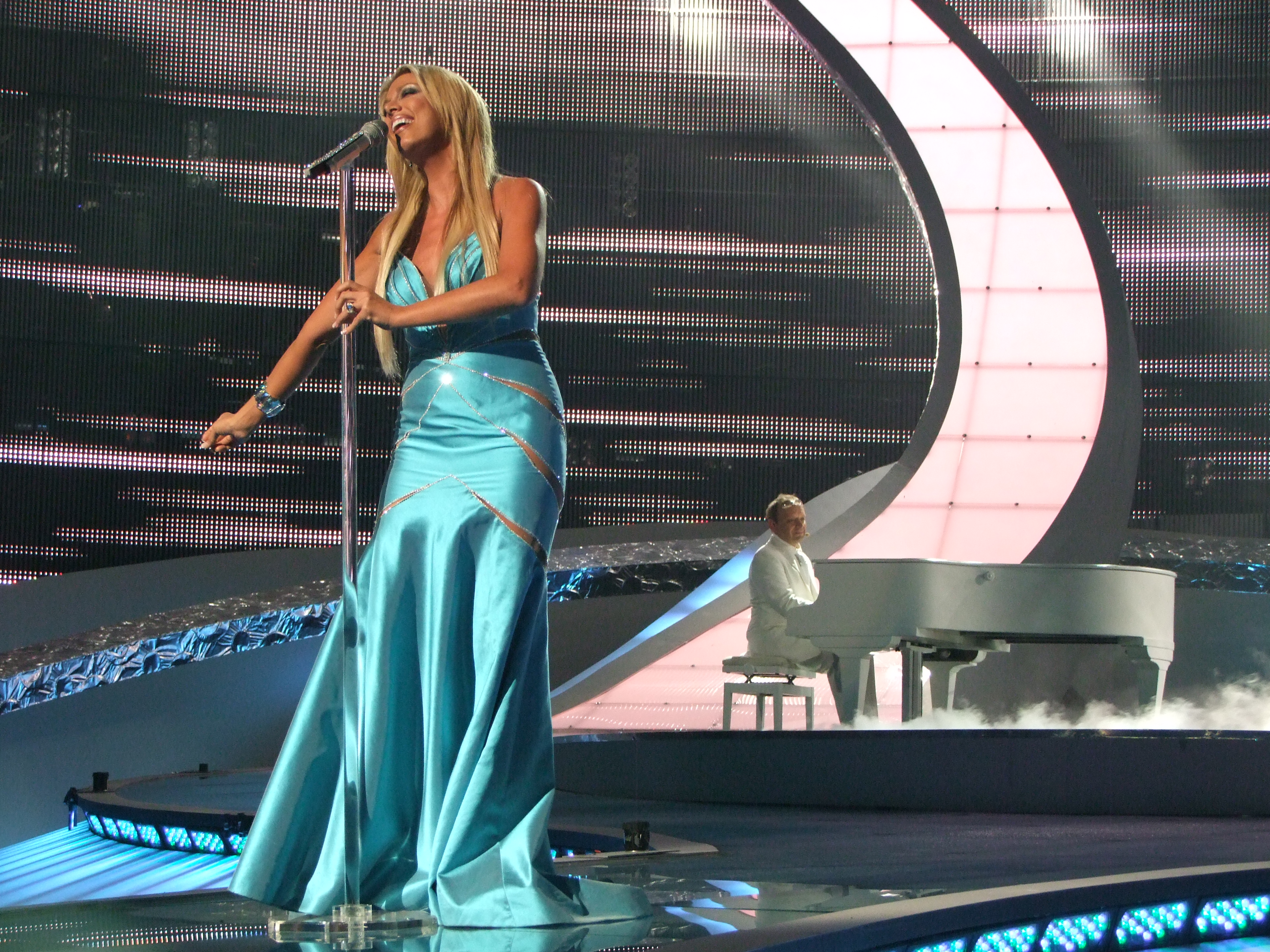
Isis Gee in Belgrade (2008)

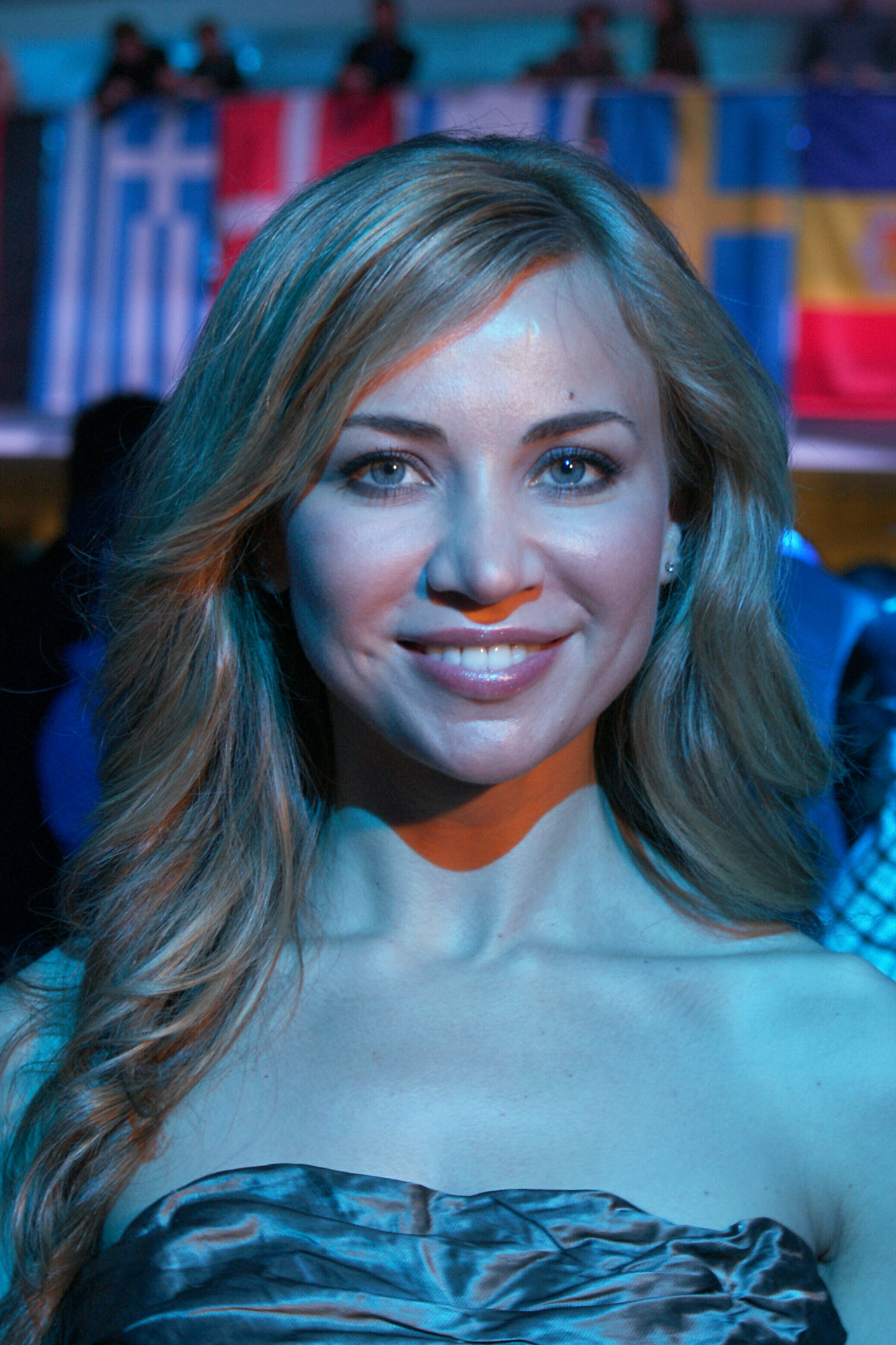
Lidia Kopania in Moscow (2009)

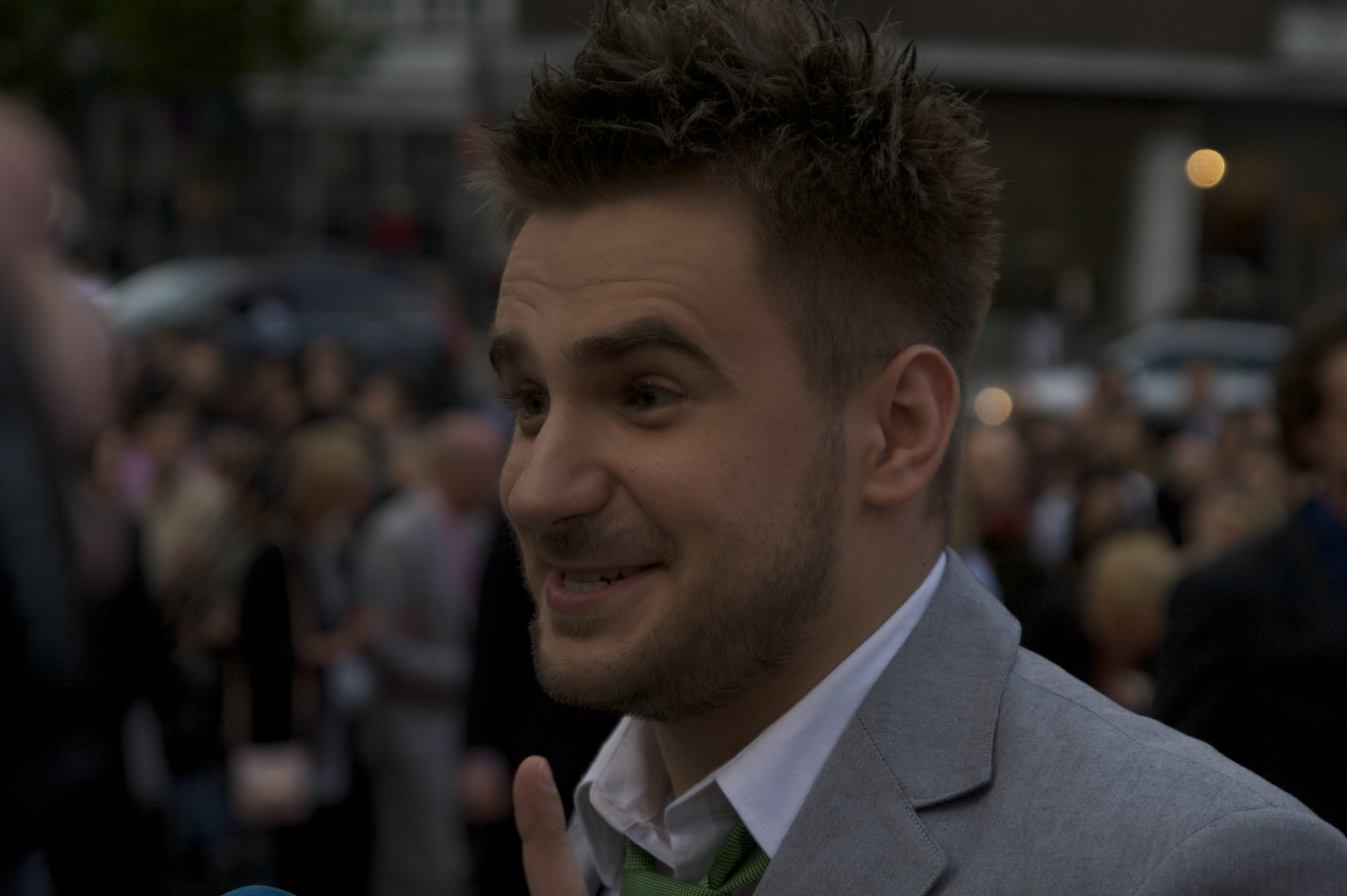
Marcin Mroziński in Oslo (2010)

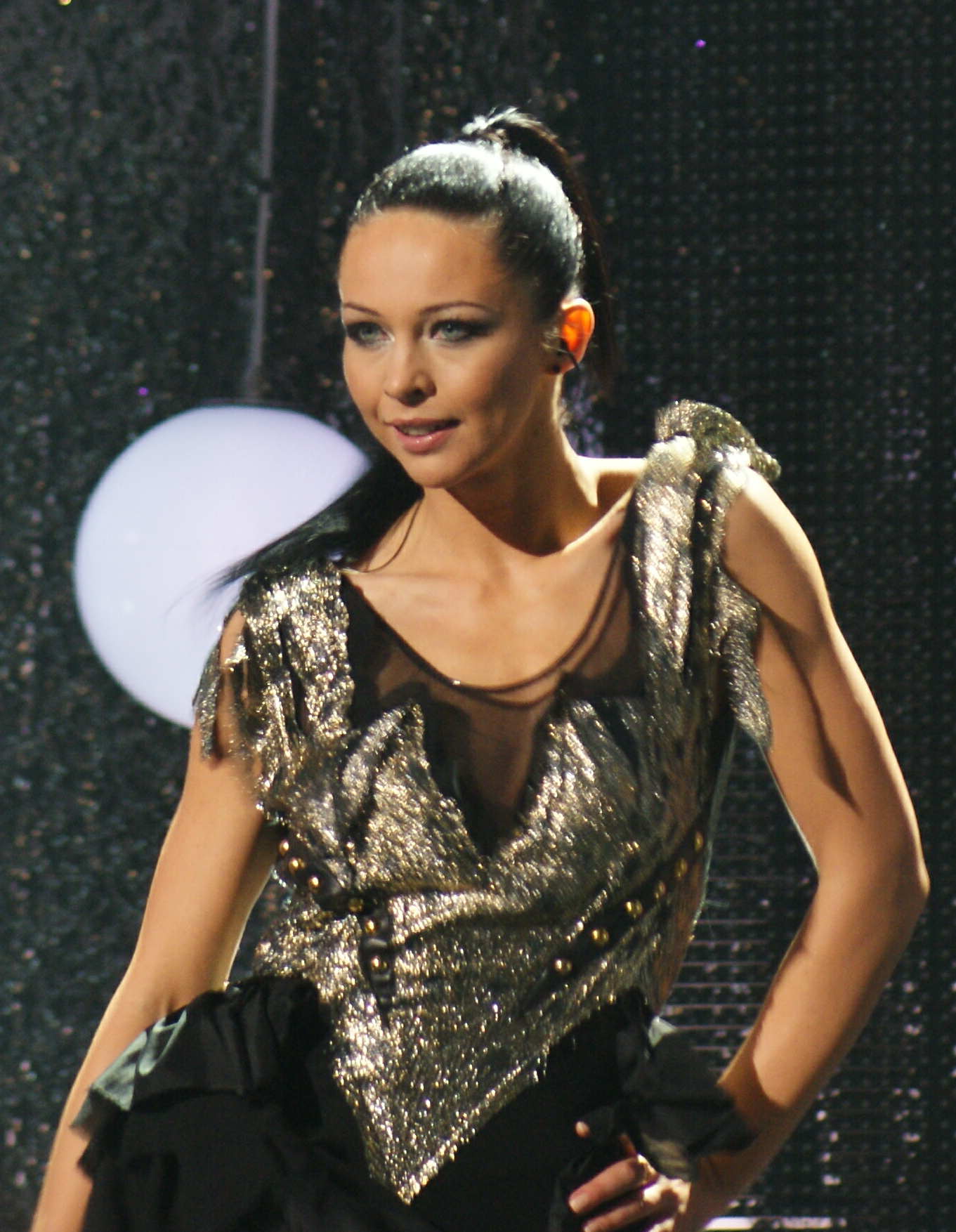
Magdalena Tul in Düsseldorf (2011)

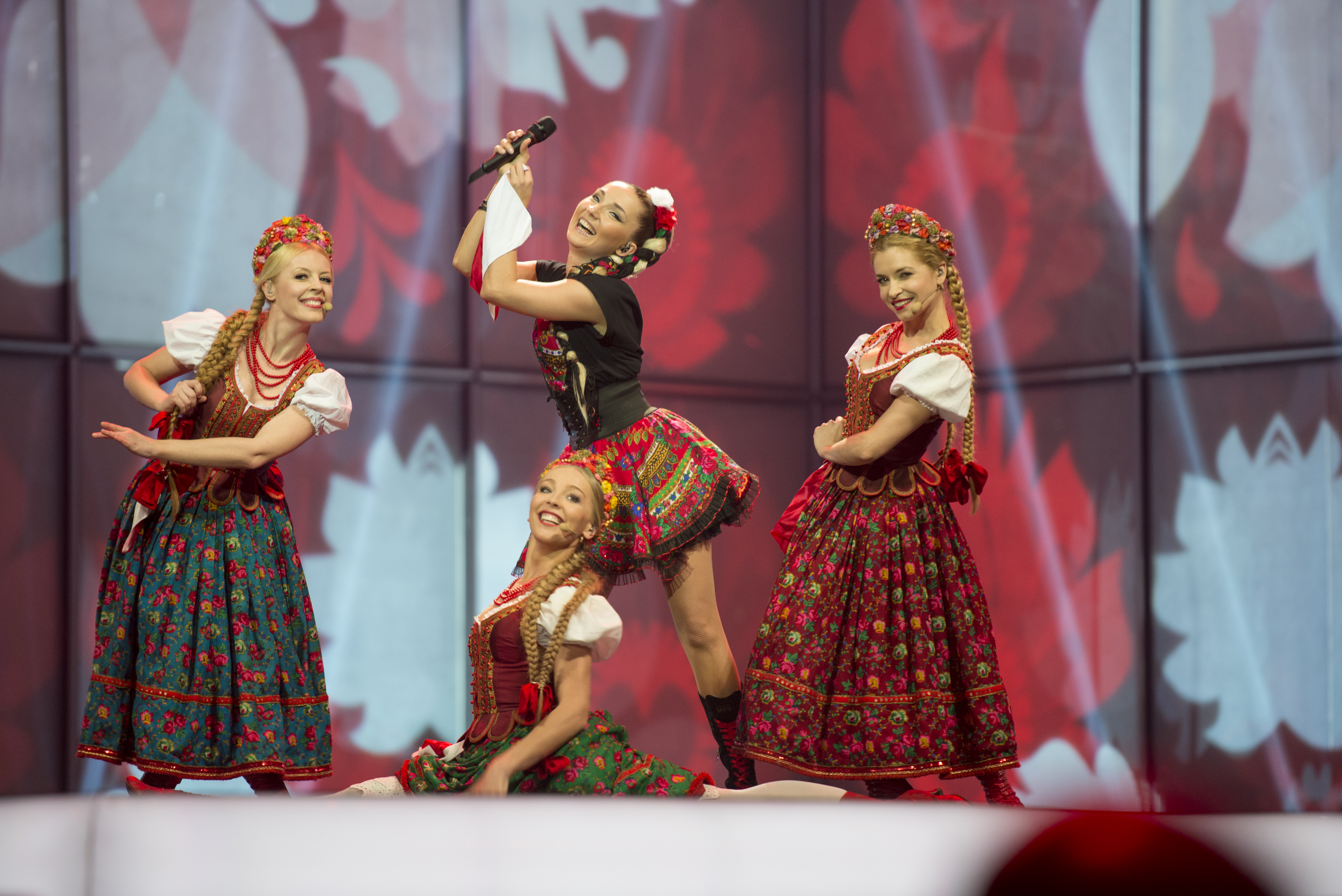
Donatan & Cleo in Copenhagen (2014)

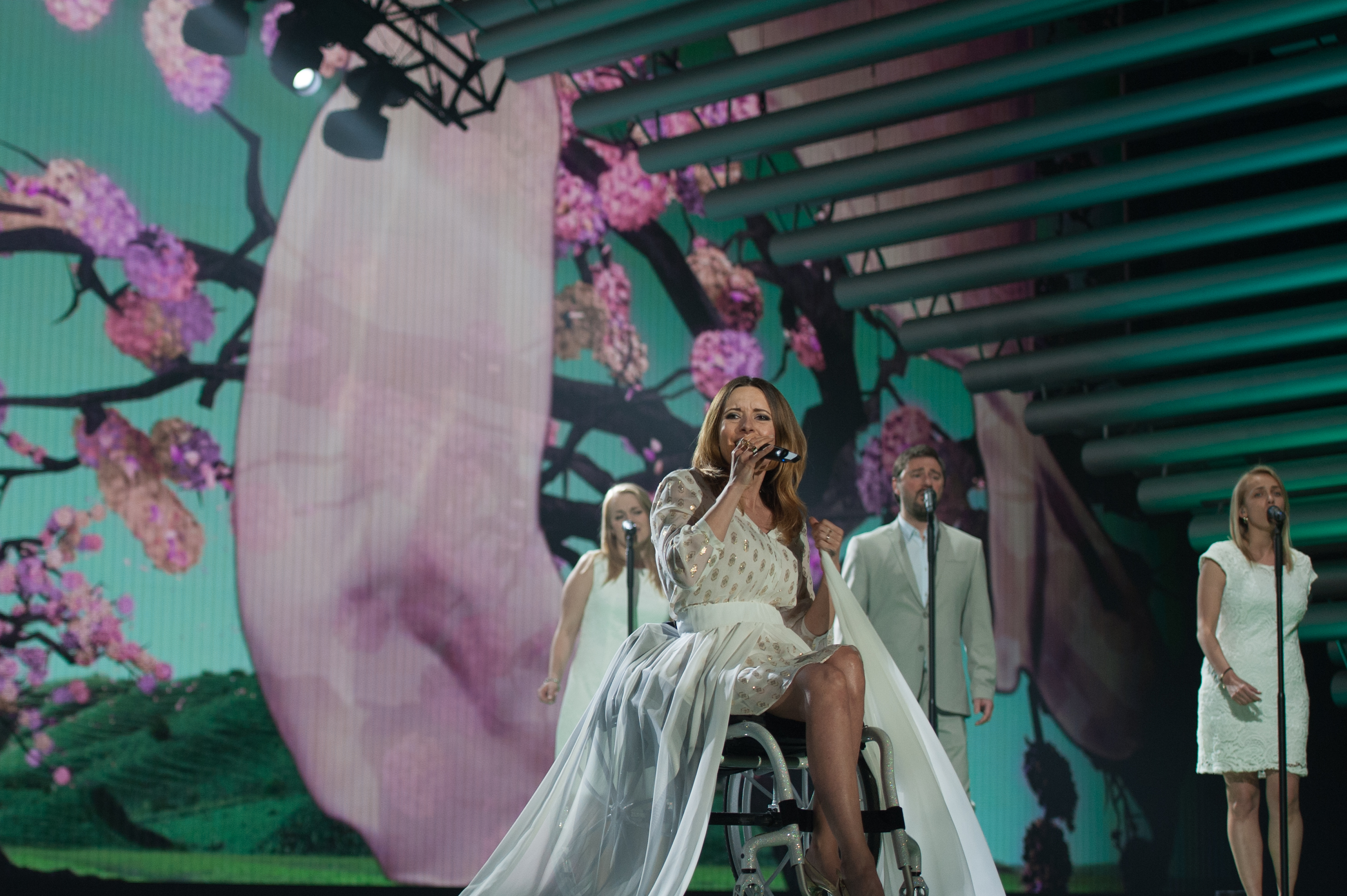
Monika Kuszyńska in Vienna (2015)

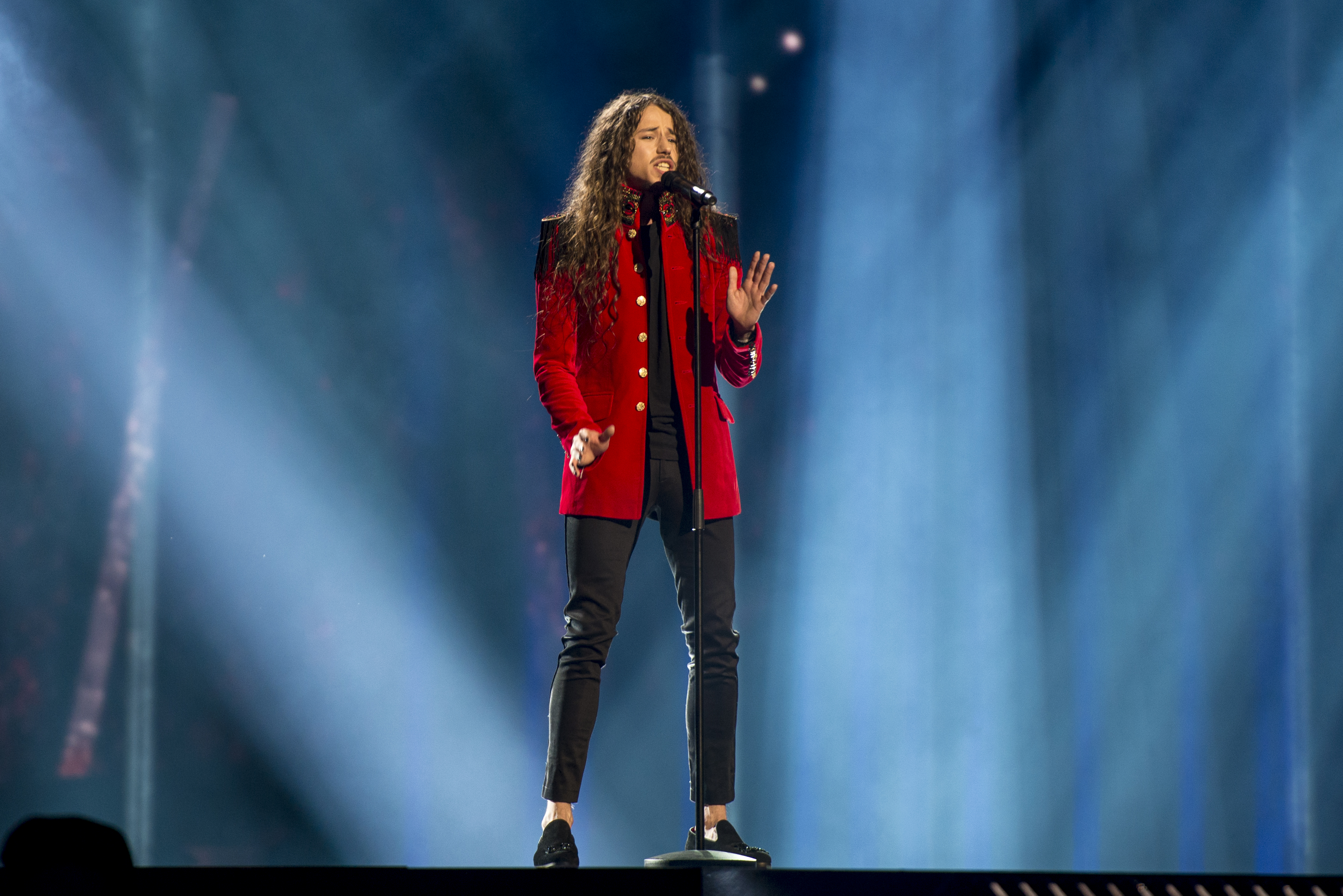
Michał Szpak in Stockholm (2016)

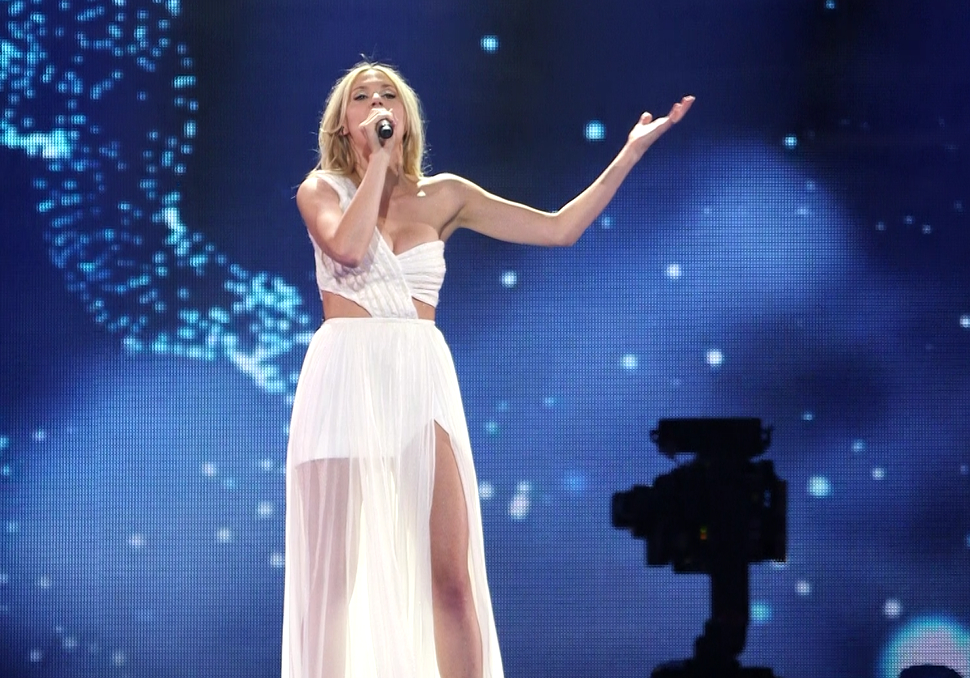
Kasia Moś in Kyiv (2017)

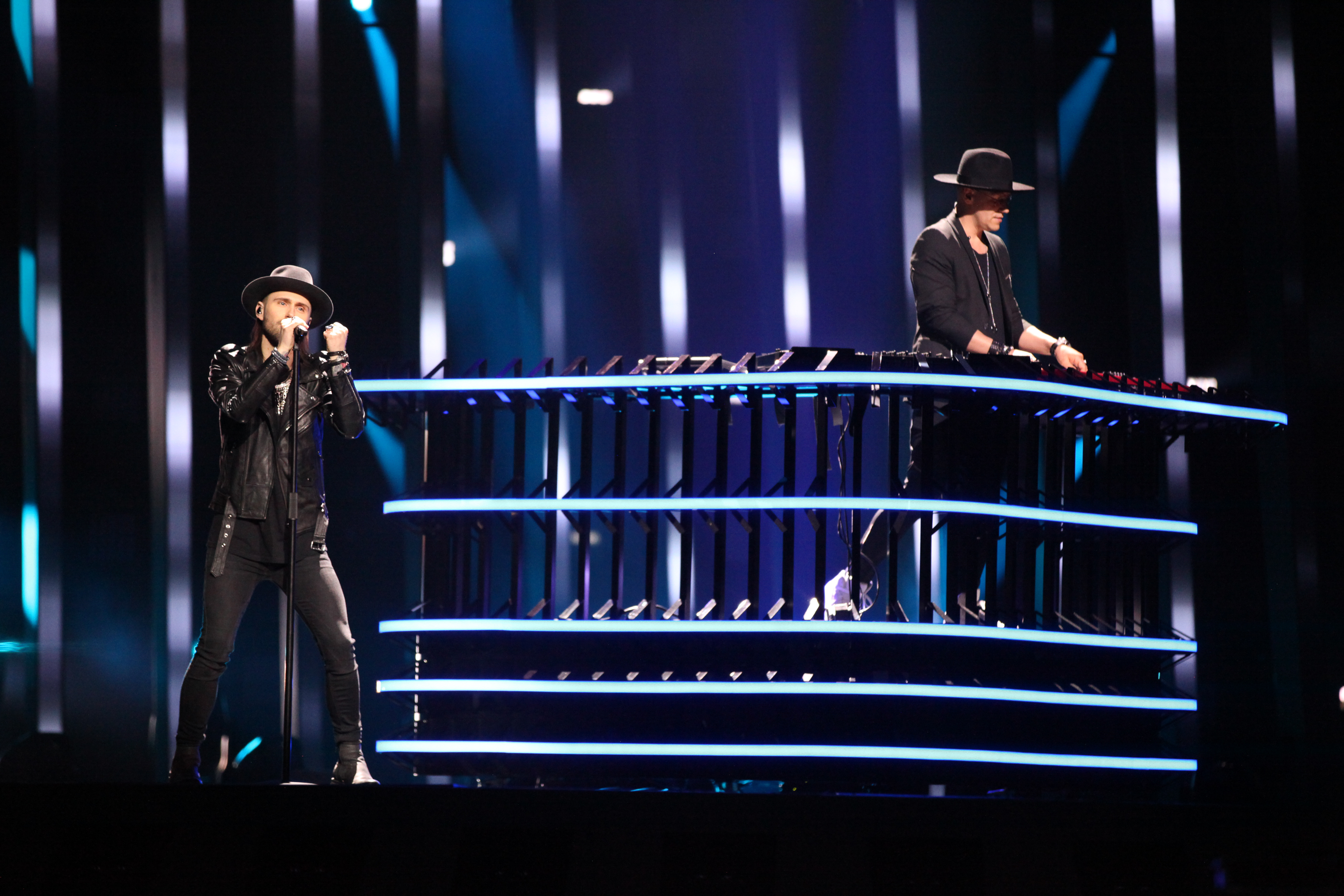
Gromee and Lukas Meijer in Lisbon (2018)

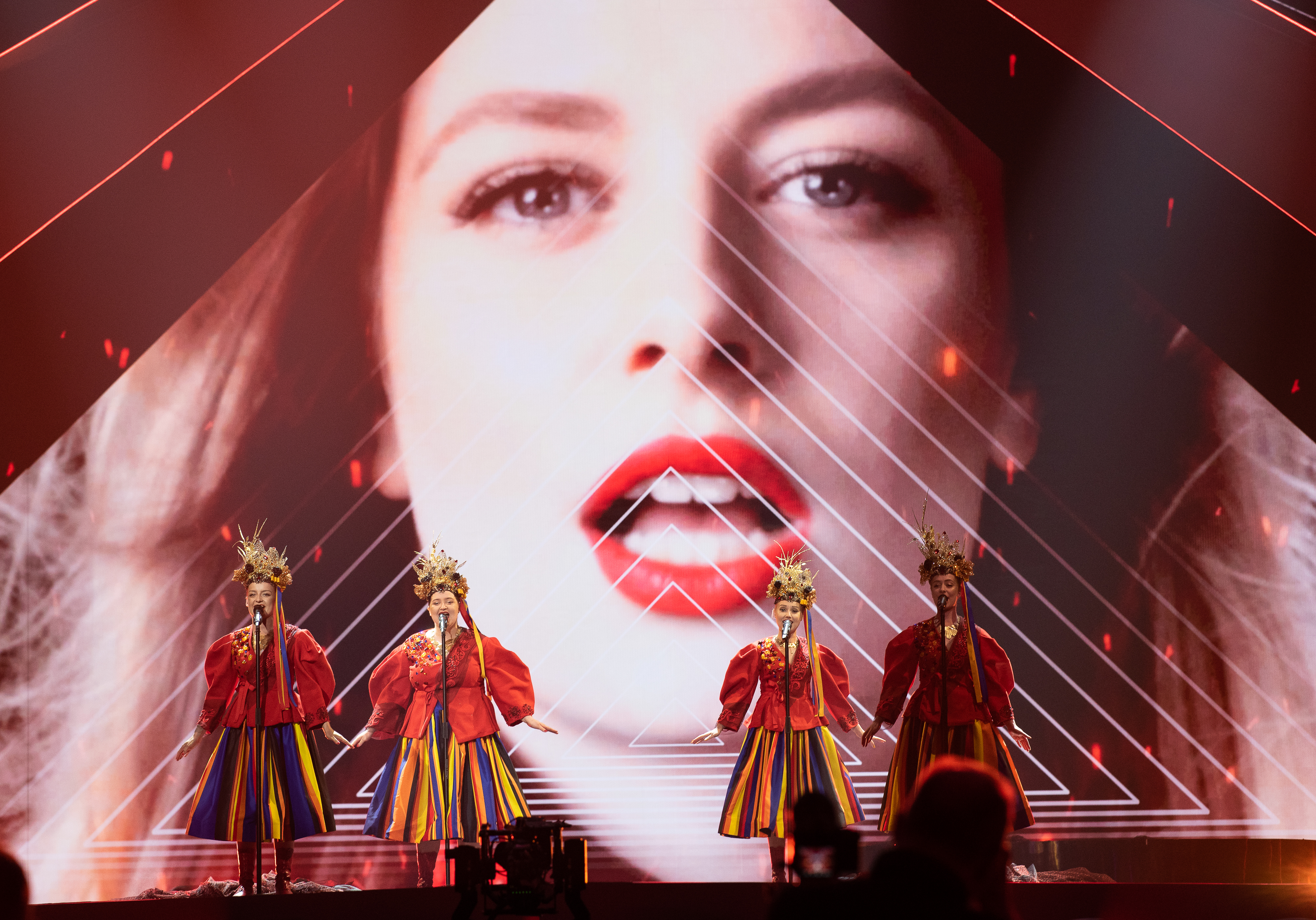
Tulia in Tel Aviv (2019)

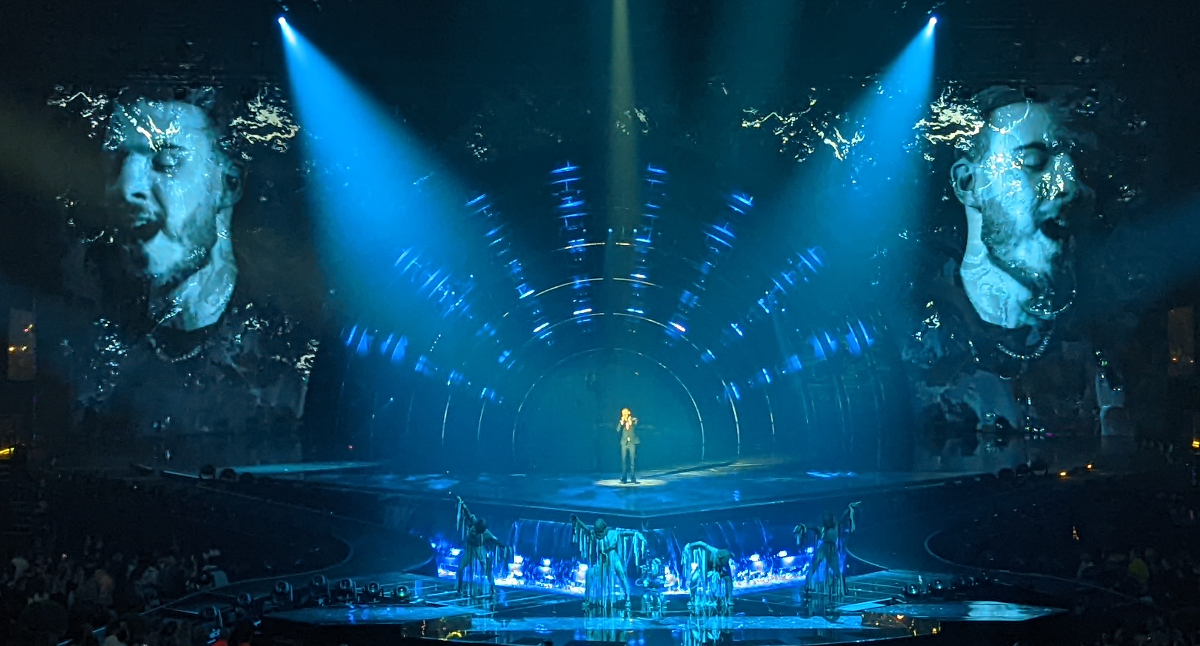
Ochman in Turin (2022)

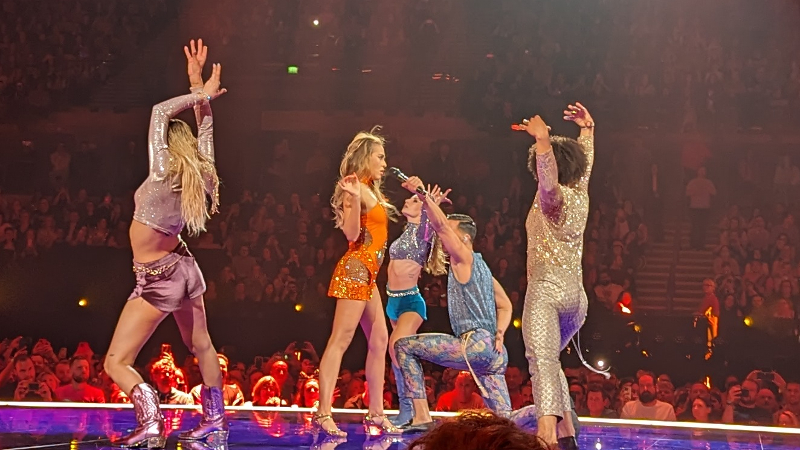
Blanka in Liverpool (2023)

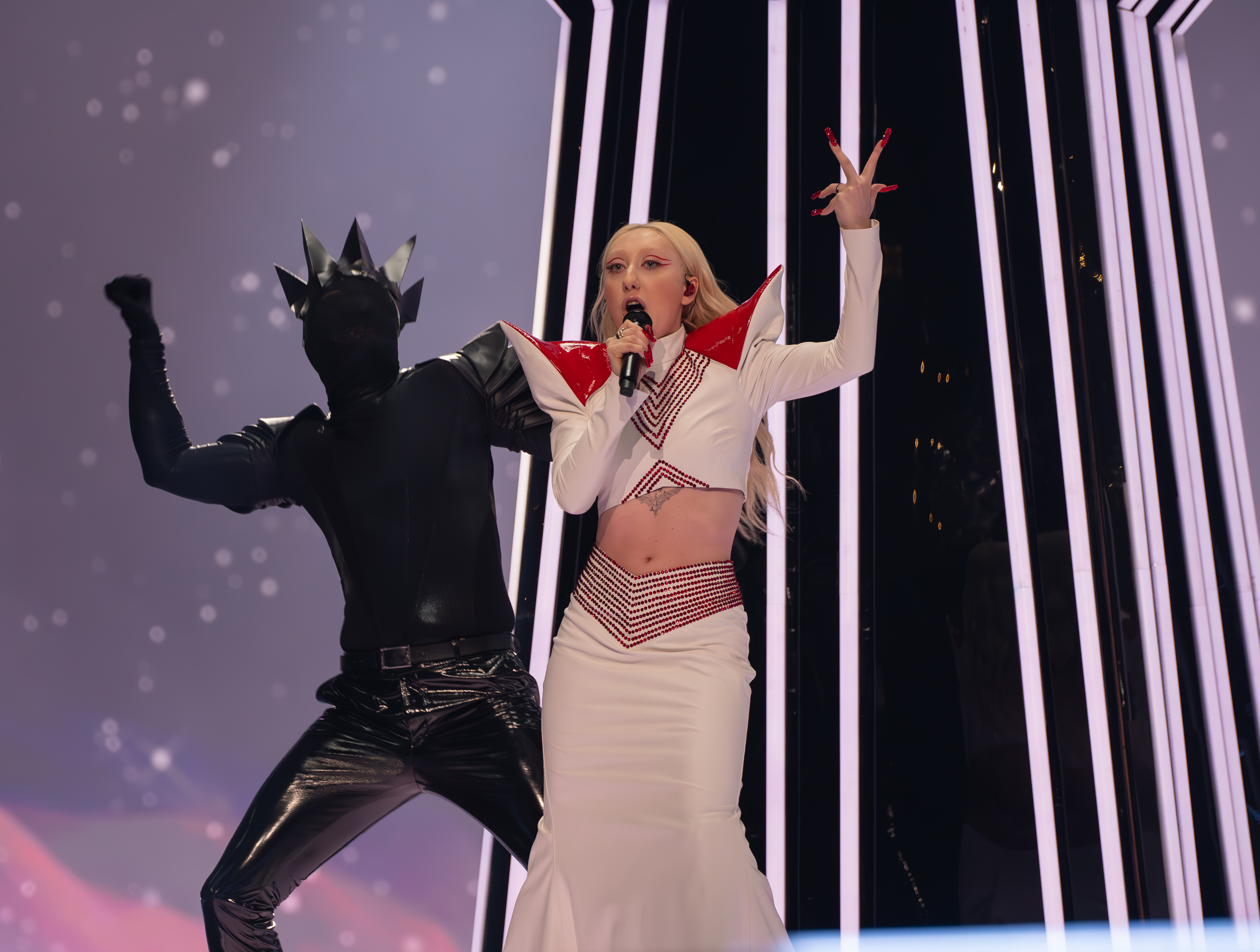
Luna in Malmö (2024)

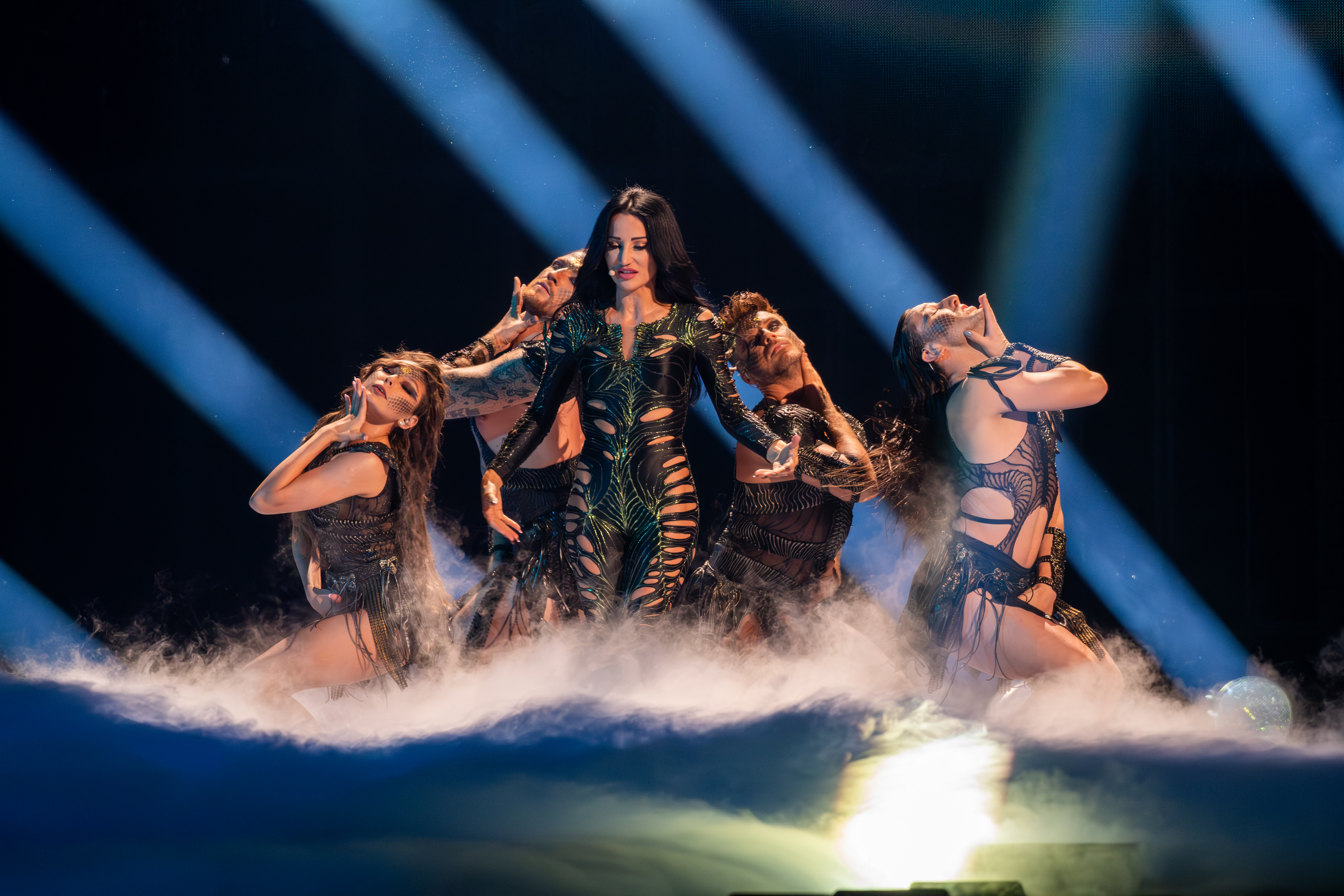
Justyna Steczkowska in Basel (2025)

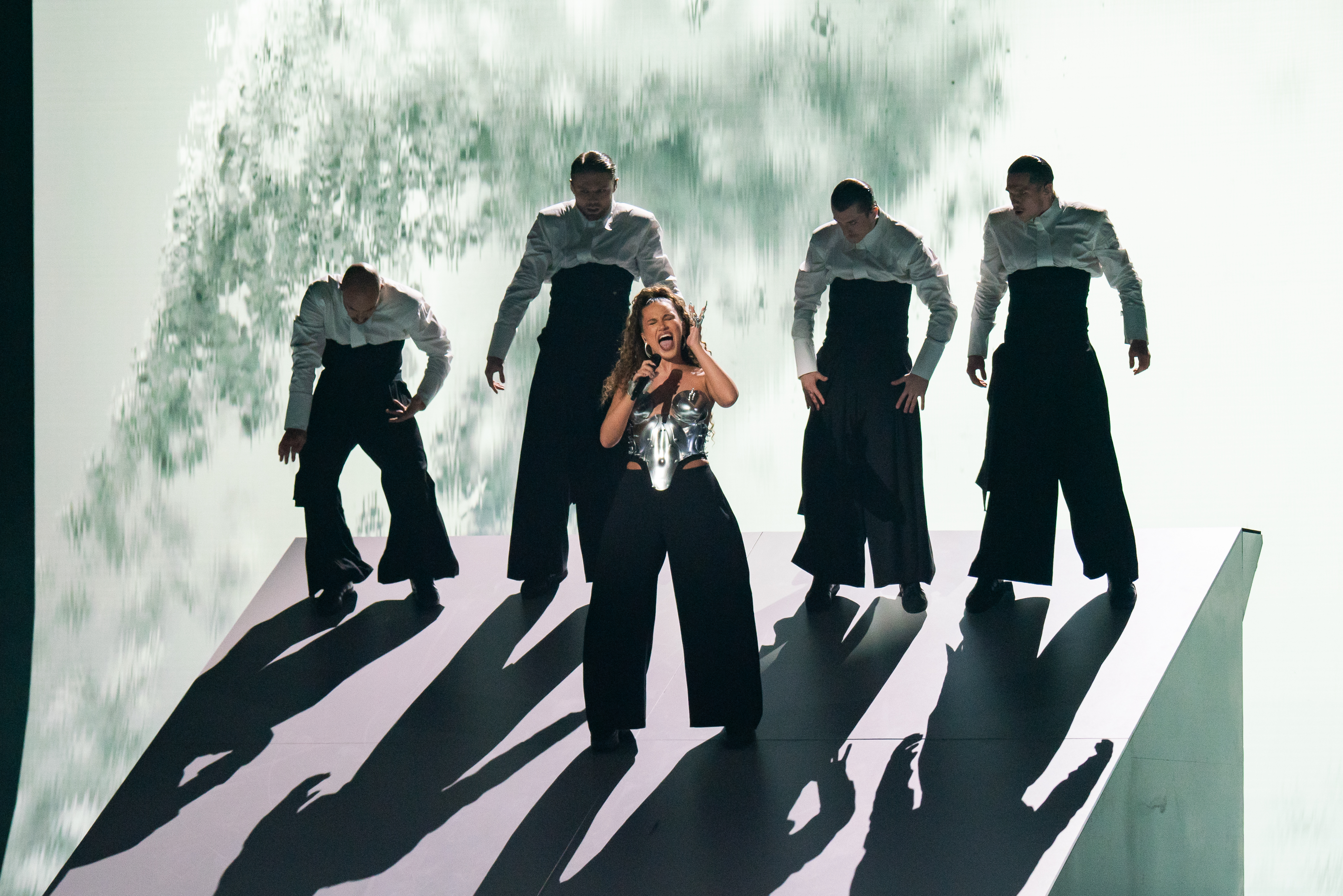
Alicja in Vienna (2026)

== See also ==
- Poland in the Junior Eurovision Song Contest
- Poland in the Eurovision Dance Contest
- Poland in the Eurovision Young Musicians
- Poland in the Eurovision Young Dancers
