= Marcin Mroziński =

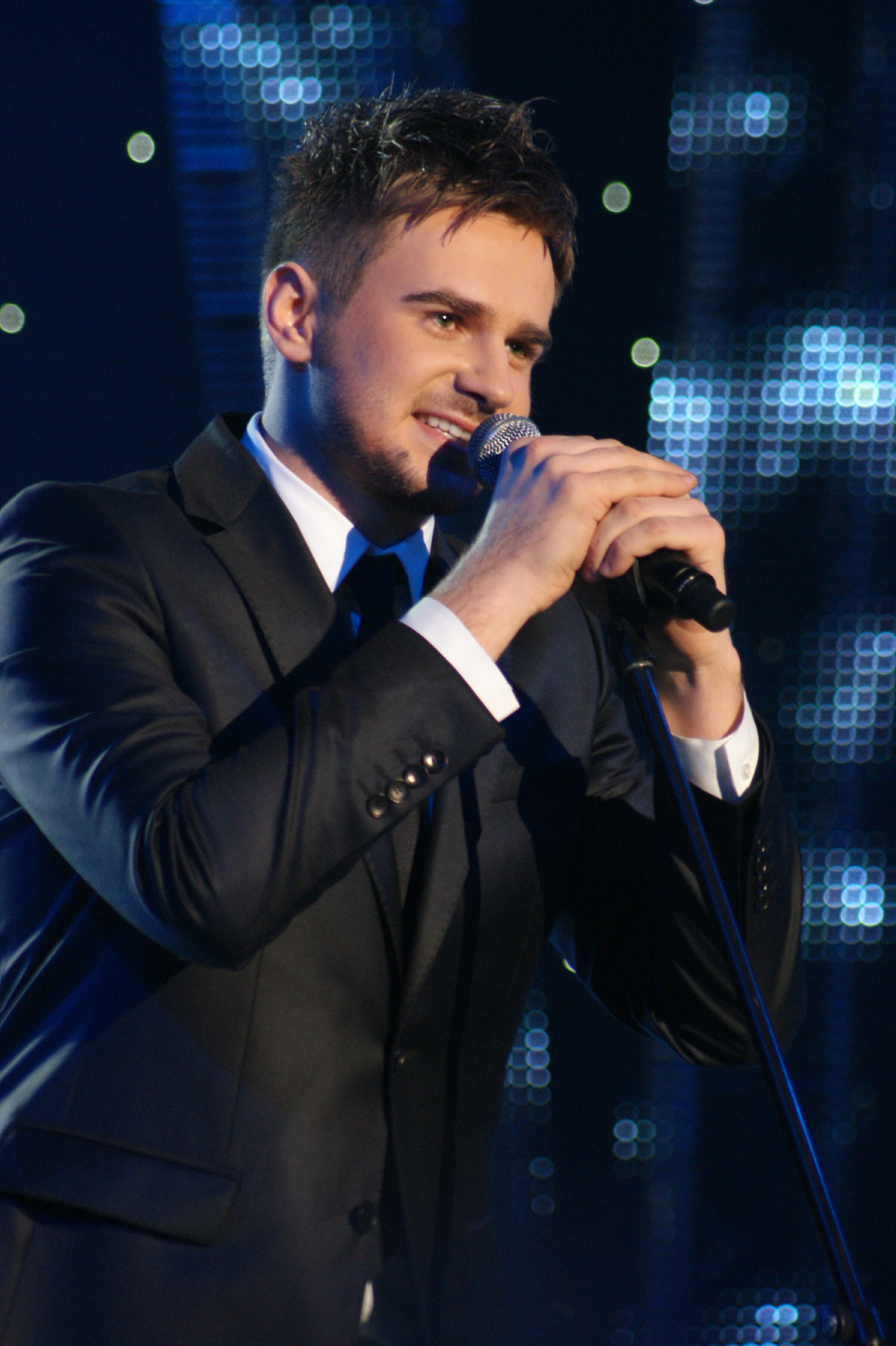

Background information
- Born: 26 September 1985 (age 40); Inowrocław, Polish People's Republic
- Occupations: Singer, TV Presenter

Marcin Mroziński (Polish pronunciation: [ˈmart͡ɕin mrɔˈʑiɲskʲi]; born 26 September 1985 in Inowrocław) is a Polish actor, singer and television presenter.

== Biography ==
=== Early life ===
Mroziński was born 26 September 1985 in Inowrocław, Poland. He started his music career at age 8. He participated in a series of children's song contests in Poland when he was young. In 1997 he won the National French Song Contest (which was held in Radziejów) and received 1st place. He also represented Poland in the International Festival "Singing Mask" and finished in 2nd place. From 1998 he started to take part in hosting TV shows in Poland and he was also a semi-finalist in the Polish edition of Idol. He was a host of the Cartoon Network Production "Staraoke" which was recorded in London.

=== Eurovision 2010 ===
On 14 February 2010, Mroziński won the Polish National Qualification and thus got the right to represent Poland in the Eurovision Song Contest 2010 with the song "Legenda".

In the first semifinal on 25 May 2010, Marcin Mroziński didn't qualify for the finals of Eurovision 2010 in Oslo. In the semi-final his song Legenda gained 13th place.

=== Eurovision 2017 ===
On 11 February 2017, it was revealed that Mroziński (under his English stage name, Martin Fitch) would compete in the 2017 edition of Krajowe Eliminacje (National Qualifiers) for the Eurovision Song Contest 2017 with the song Fight for Us. He placed 7th out of 10 entries.

=== Musicals ===
He was a cast in following musicals:

- "The Phantom Of The Opera as Raoul, Vicomte de Chagny - Teatr Muzyczny ROMA, Warszaw, 2008
- "Boyband" (by Peter Quilter) as Sean - Teatr Kwadrat, Warsaw, 1998
- "Les Misérables" as Marius - Teatr Muzyczny ROMA, Warszaw, since 2010

== See also ==
- Poland in the Eurovision Song Contest 2010

Awards and achievements
Preceded by Lidia Kopania with "I Don't Wanna Leave"	Poland in the Eurovision Song Contest; 2010	Succeeded by Magdalena Tul with "Jestem"
