= Flashlight (Kasia Moś song) =

2017 single by Kasia Moś

Single by Kasia Moś
- Released: 10 March 2017
- Genre: Electropop; dark pop; orchestral pop
- Length: 3:00
- Label: Independent
- Songwriter(s): Kasia Moś; Pete Barringer; Rickard Bonde Truumeel

Kasia Moś singles chronology
"Addiction" (2016)	"Flashlight" (2017)	"Wild Eyes" (2018)

Eurovision Song Contest 2017 entry
- Country: Poland
- Artist(s): Kasia Moś
- Language: English
- Composer(s): Kasia Moś; Pete Baringger; Rickard Bonde Truumeel
- Lyricist(s): Kasia Moś; Pete Baringger; Rickard Bonde Truumeel

Finals performance
- Semi-final result: 9th
- Semi-final points: 119
- Final result: 22nd
- Final points: 64

Entry chronology
- ◄ "Color of Your Life" (2016)
- "Light Me Up" (2018) ►

"Flashlight" is a song performed by Polish singer Kasia Moś. The song was released as a digital download on 10 March 2017. It represented Poland in the Eurovision Song Contest 2017, and was written by Moś, Pete Barringer and Rickard Bonde Truumeel.

The single peaked at number 55 on the Polish Airplay Chart.

== Eurovision Song Contest ==
Moś was confirmed to be taking part in Krajowe Eliminacje 2017, Poland's national selection for the Eurovision Song Contest 2017, on 11 February 2017. Moś went on to win the national final, on 18 February, placing first with the juries and second with the public, and represented Poland in the Eurovision Song Contest 2017. Poland competed in the second half of the first semi-final at the Eurovision Song Contest.

== Track listing ==
Digital download
No.	Title	Length
1.	"Flashlight"	3:00

== Charts ==
=== Weekly charts ===
Chart (2017)	Peak position
Poland (Polish Airplay Top 100)	55
Poland (Polish Airplay New)	1

== Release history ==
Region	Date	Format	Label
Worldwide	10 March 2017	Digital download	Independent
