= Magdalena Tul =

Polish singer and composer (born 1980)

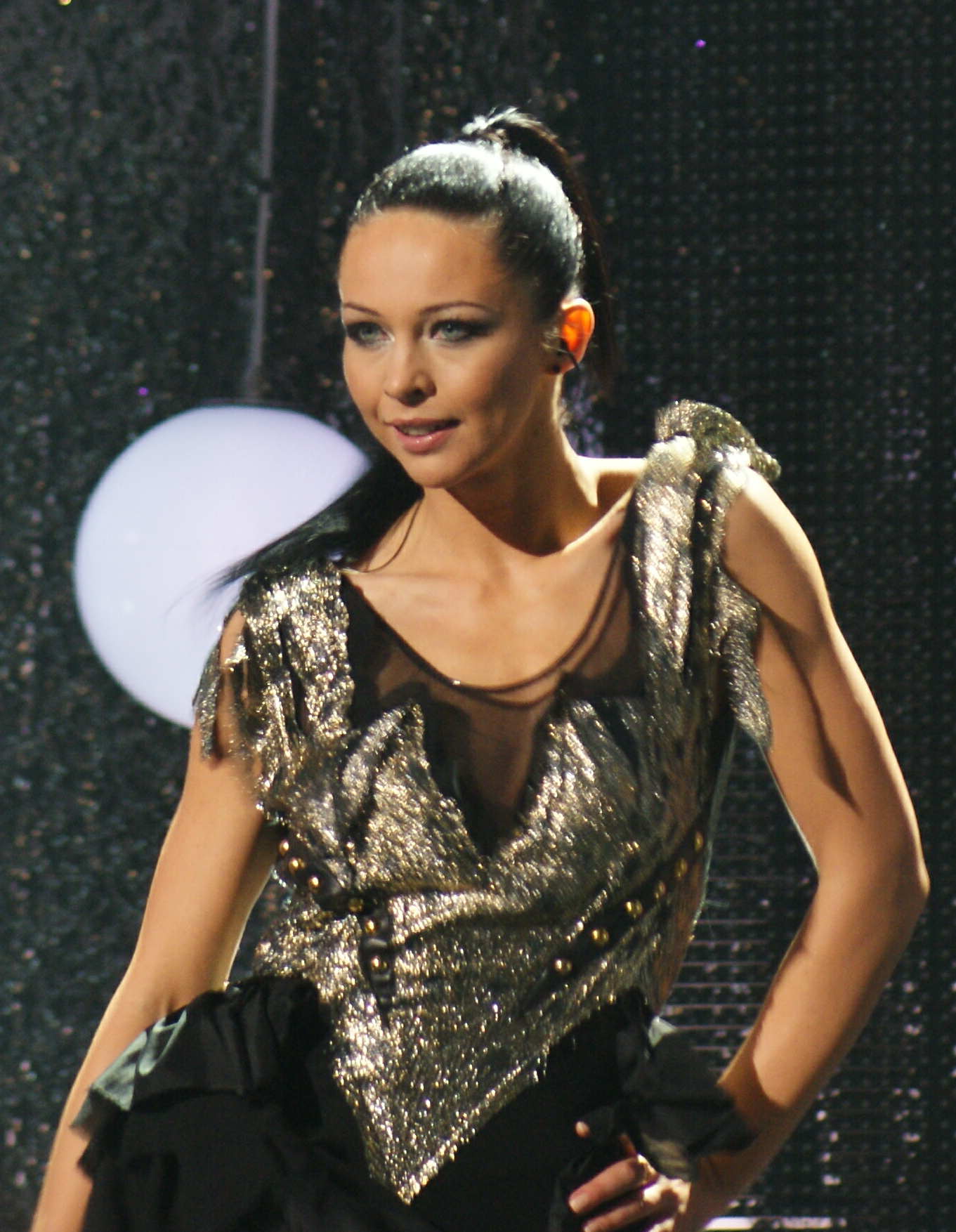
- Magdalena Tul, 2011

Background information
- Also known as: Lady Tullo
- Born: 29 April 1980 (age 46); Gdańsk, Poland
- Origin: Bydgoszcz, Poland
- Genres: Pop
- Occupation: Singer
- Years active: 2000 – present
- Website: https://magdalenatul.com/

Magdalena Ewa Tul (born 29 April 1980) is a Polish singer, dubbing actress and composer. In 2000 she moved from Gdańsk to Warsaw where she started working as a singer and actress for Studio Buffo, a musical theater. She performed there as a lead singer in Metro. Three years later, she started working with another musical theater, Roma. She performed there in the musicals Miss Saigon, Grease, Cats and Academy of Mister Kleks.

== Early life and career ==
At age 12, Tul participated in a local children's band which eventually led to her interest in music. She was shortlisted during the Polish pre-selection for the Eurovision Song Contest 2005. Six years later, on 14 February 2011, she was chosen to represent Poland at the Eurovision Song Contest 2011 with her entry, "Jestem". She did not reach the finals, having come last in the semi-finals in 19th position.

In 2012, she sent in a song for the Swiss selection in the Eurovision Song Contest 2013 in Malmö, Sweden. The song's title was "Give It Up" but she didn't reach the final. She returned to the contest in 2014 as a jury member.

In 2013, she became a contestant on The Voice of Poland.

In June 2014, she released "Brave".

In June 2019, she released "Mindfulness" her latest album.

In 2026, Tul was confirmed as a participant in the casting stage of the San Marino Song Contest, the national selection process used to choose San Marino's representative for the Eurovision Song Contest 2026. She qualified for the final on 6 March.

== Discography ==
=== Albums ===
Title	Details
V.O.H. - The Victory of Heart	Released: 13 August 2007; Label: Loud Tally RCDS; Format: CD
Brave	Released: 6 June 2014; Label: Polskie Nagrania Muza; Format: Digital download, CD
Mindfulness	Released: 3 June 2019; Format: Digital download

=== Extended plays ===
Title	Details
The Beginning	Released: 16 November 2013; Format: Digital download

=== Singles ===
Title	Year	Album
"Full of Life"	2004	V.O.H. - The Victory of Heart
"Idź swoją drogą"	2005	Non-album single
"Find the Music"	2006	V.O.H. - The Victory of Heart
"Tryin’"	2007	V.O.H. - The Victory of Heart
"Nie ma jej"	2010	Non-album single
"Jestem"	2010	Brave
"I'll Never Forget"	2011	Non-album single
"Jak zapomnieć"	2012	Brave
"Give It Up"	2012	Brave
"I Am Who I Am"	2013	Brave
"Ile mogę dać?"	2014	Brave
"So Good" (featuring Sound’n’Grace)	2014	Brave
"Closer" (featuring Chesney Snow)	2017	Mindfulness
"Bliżej"	2017	Mindfulness
"Va Banque"	2018	Mindfulness
"Move Forward"	2019	Mindfulness
"Love Myself Again"	2025	Non-album single

== See also ==
- Poland in the Eurovision Song Contest 2011

Awards and achievements
Preceded by Marcin Mroziński with "Legenda"	Poland in the Eurovision Song Contest; 2011	Succeeded by Donatan & Cleo with "My Słowianie – We Are Slavic"
