= The Voice of Poland season 11 =

2020 season of Polish television show

The Voice of Poland
- Season 11
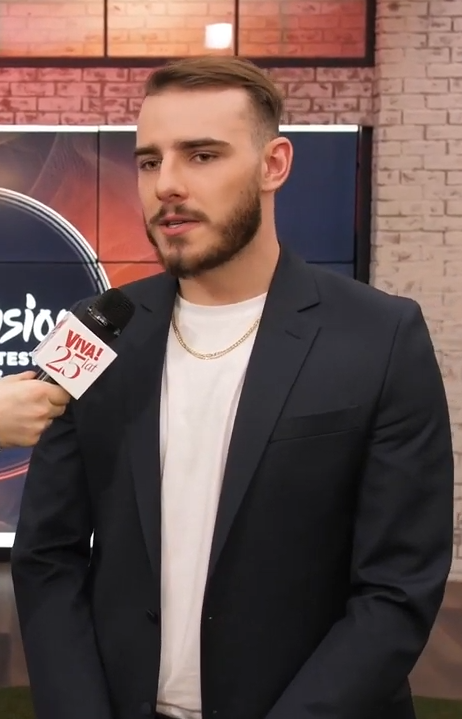
- The Voice of Poland logo

Release
- Original network: TVP 2
- Original release: September 12 – December 5, 2020
- Hosted by: Tomasz Kammel; Maciej Musiał; Adam Zdrójkowski; Małgorzata Tomaszewska
- Judges: Edyta Górniak; Michał Szpak; Urszula Dudziak; Tomson & Baron
- Winner: Krystian Ochman
- Runner-up: Adam Kalinowski

Season chronology
- ← Previous; Season 10 Next → Season 12

The eleventh season of The Voice of Poland began airing on 12 September 2020 on TVP 2. It aired on Saturdays at 21:00

Michał Szpak and Tomson & Baron returned as coaches again. Also Edyta Górniak returned to the show after a five-year break for her fourth season. Urszula Dudziak, was the new coach in the eleventh season, who resigned from being a coach in The Voice Senior show and joined the jury panel of the eleventh season of The Voice of Poland.

Krystian Ochman won the season, marking Michał Szpak's second win as a coach.

== Coaches and hosts ==
On August 10, 2020, it was announced that Michał Szpak, Tomson & Baron, Edyta Górniak and Urszula Dudziak would become the coaches for the eleventh season of the show. Małgorzata Tomaszewska replaced Marcelina Zawadzka as the show's new host, alongside returning presenters Tomasz Kammel and Maciej Musiał, and Adam Zdrójkowski.

Coaches and hosts gallery

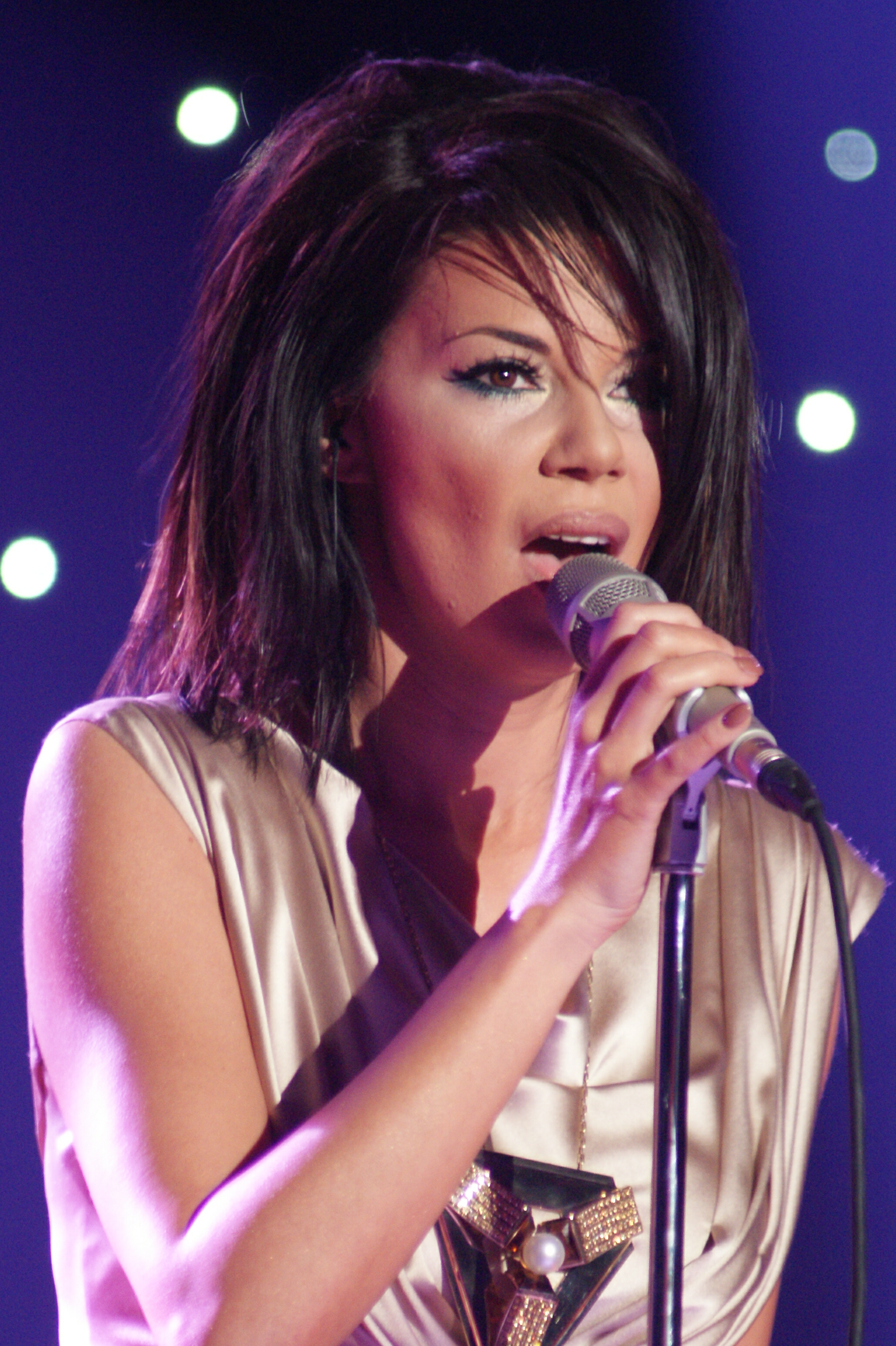
Edyta Górniak

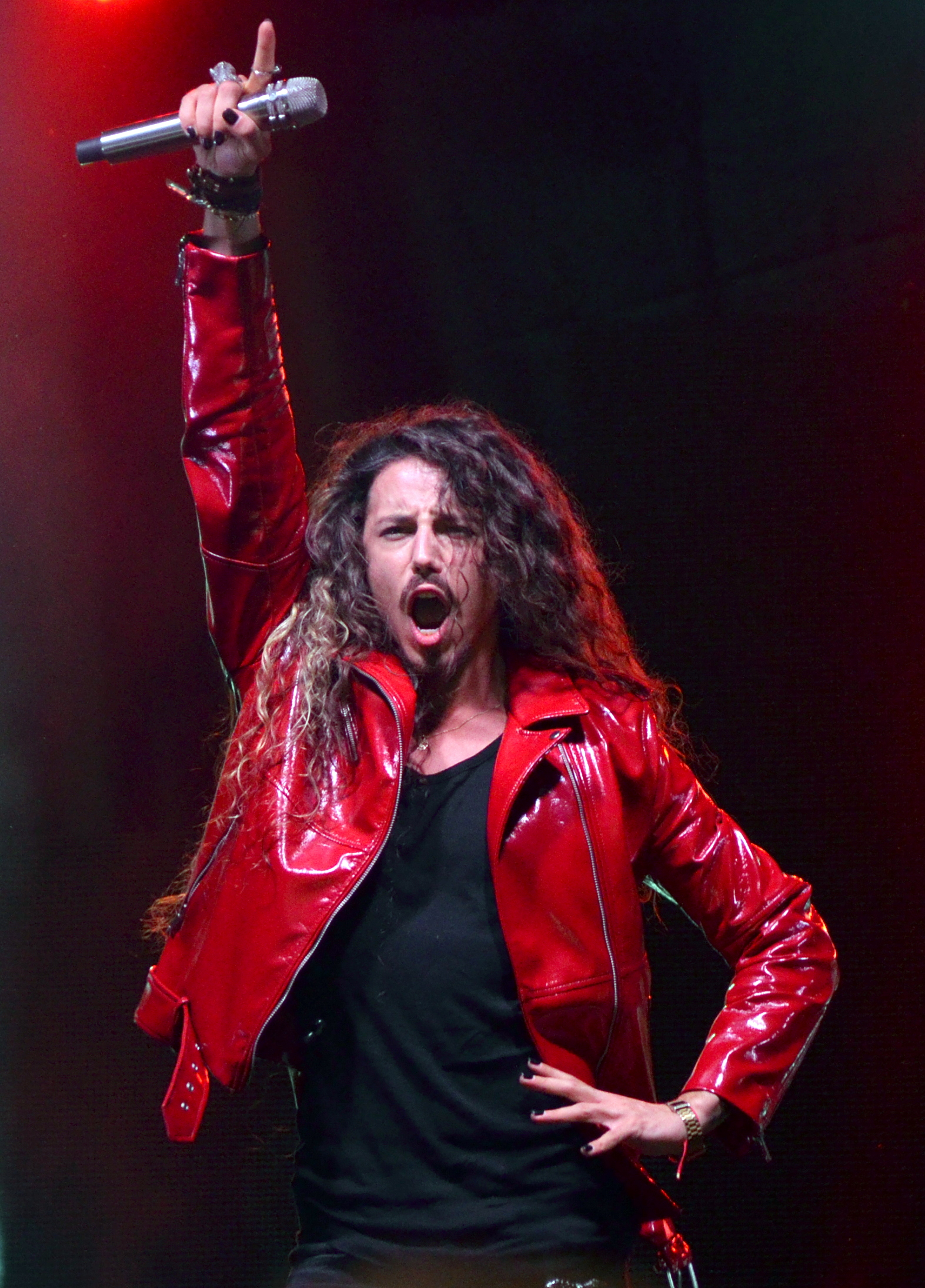
Michał Szpak

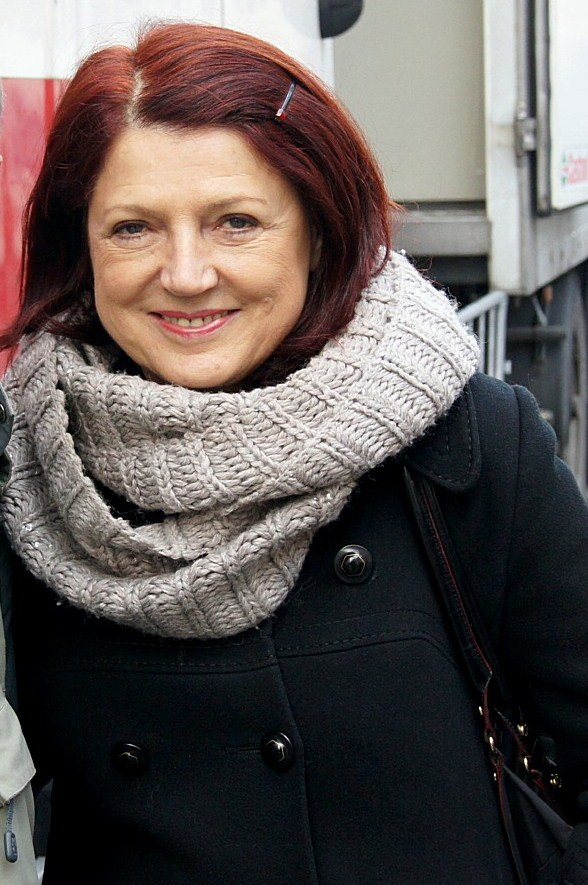
Urszula Dudziak

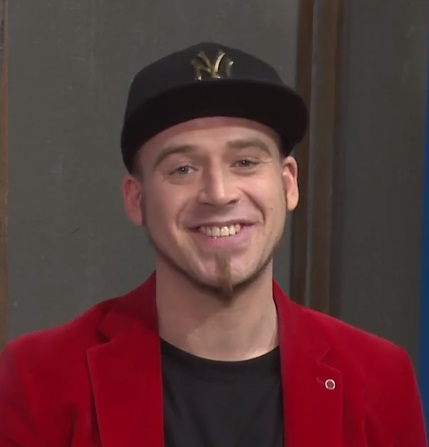
Tomasz Lach (duo)

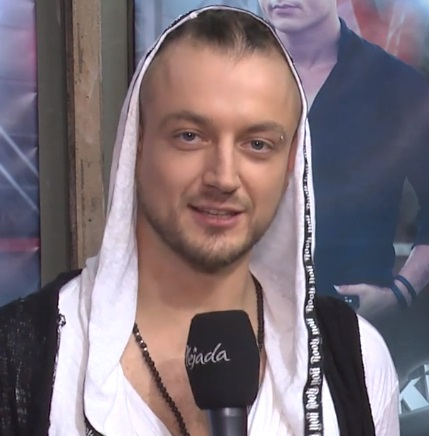
Aleksandr Milwiw-Baron (duo)

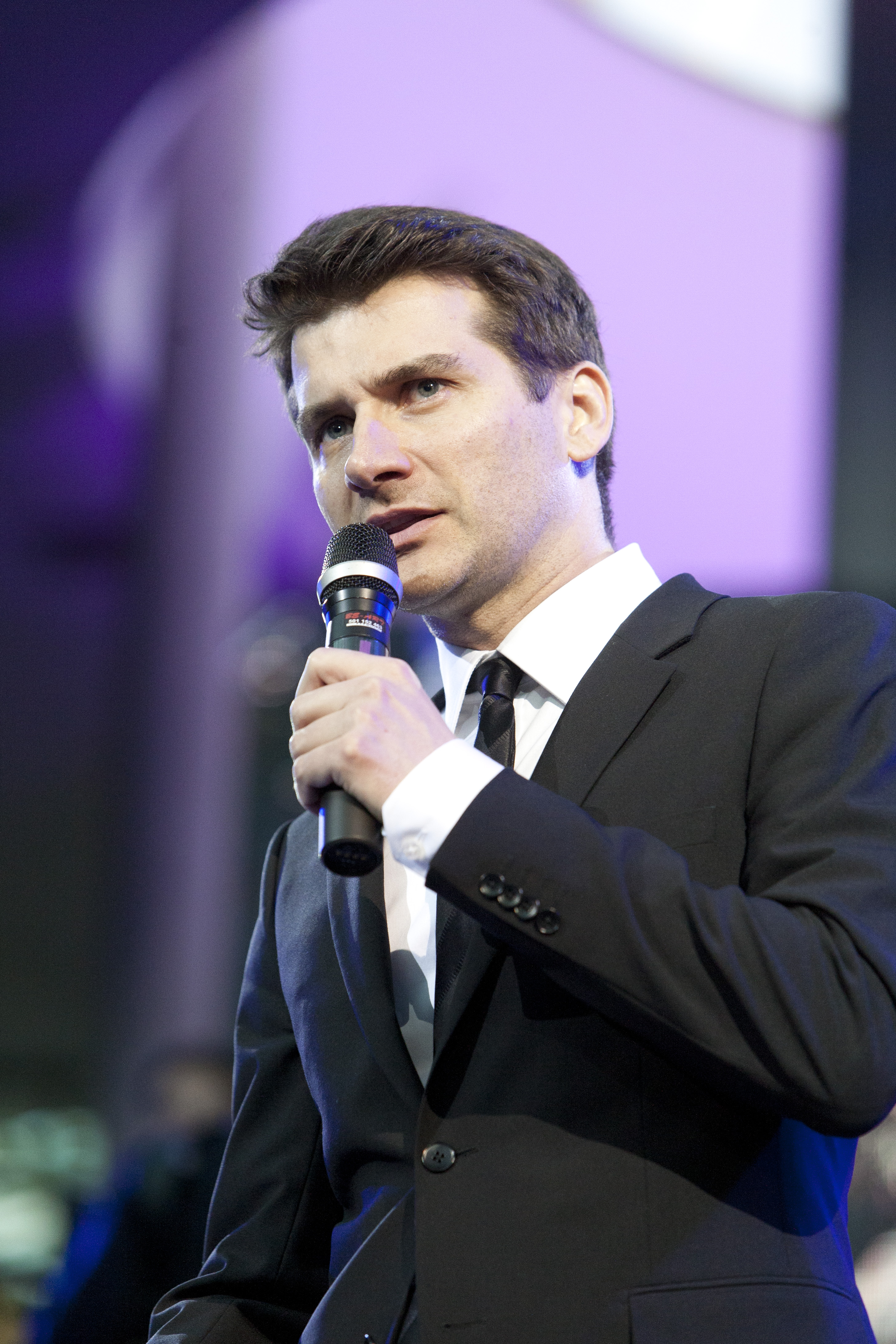
Tomasz Kammel

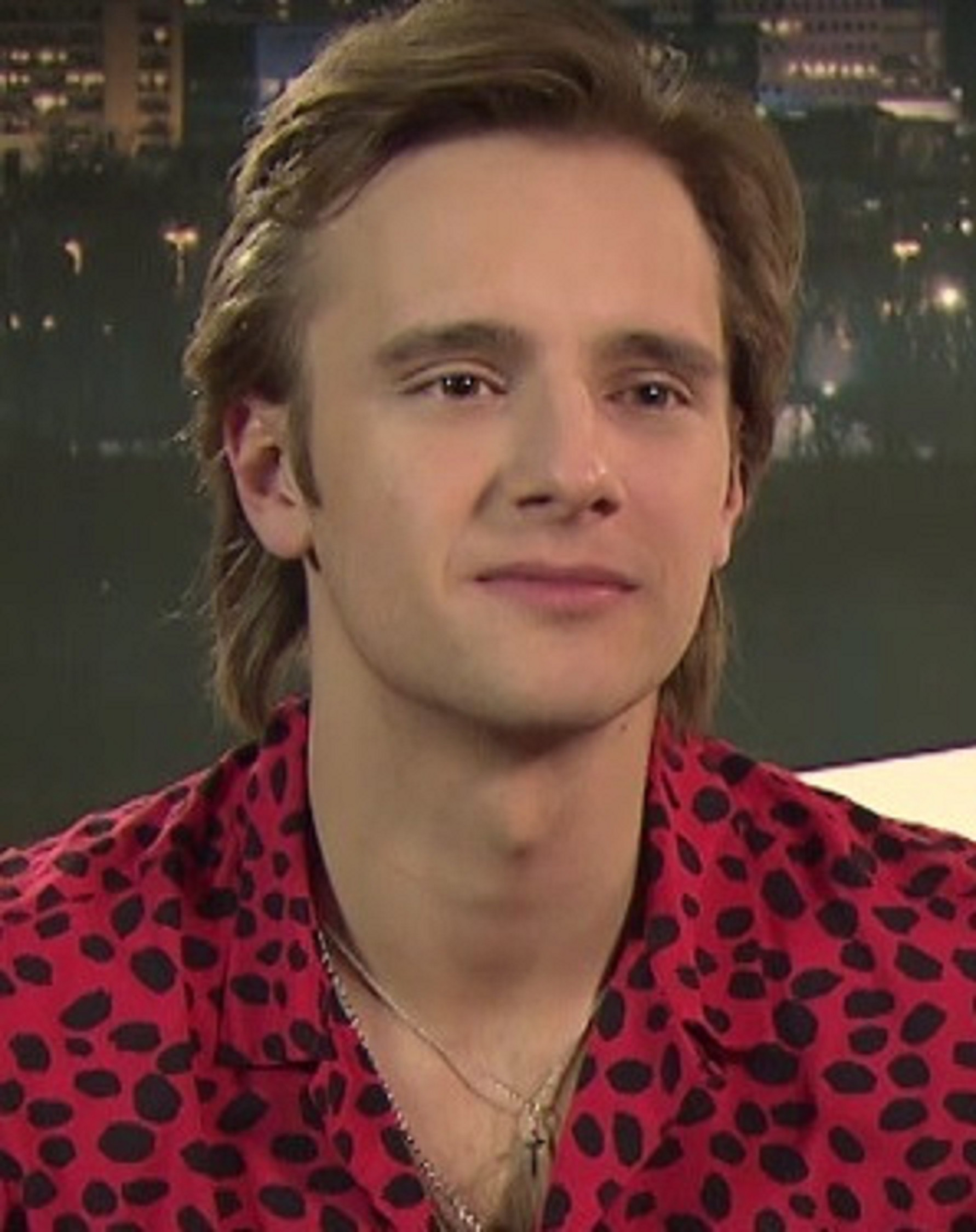
Maciej Musiał

== Teams ==
- Winner
- Runner-up
- Third place
- Fourth place
- Eliminated in the Semifinals
- Eliminated in the Quarterfinals
- Eliminated in the Live round
- Eliminated in the Knockout round
- Artist was stolen by another coach (Name is struck through)
- Artist was stolen but was later switched with another artist and got eliminated
- Eliminated in the Battle rounds
- Withdrew

Coaches	Top 48 artists				
Edyta Górniak					
Edyta Górniak	Anna Gąsienica-Byrcyn	Anna Nadkierniczna	Ignacy Błażejowski	Marta Bielawska	Maciej Wójcikowski
Edyta Górniak	Ola Matyka	Anna Serafińska	Magdalena Ćwiertnia	Kasia Miernik-Jeremias	Natalia Cwajna
Edyta Górniak	Michał Cywiński	Angelika Kiepura	Miłosz Mogielski		
Michał Szpak					
Michał Szpak	Krystian Ochman	Mikołaj Macioszczyk	Mateusz Psonak	Wojciech Lechończak	Kasia Szulc
Michał Szpak	Szymon Czyżewski	Przemysław Pajdak	~~Anna Małek~~	~~Maciej Wójcikowski~~	Weronika Szymańska
Michał Szpak	Paweł Sznajder	Justyna Jarząbek	Monika Miedzianowska		
Urszula Dudziak					
Urszula Dudziak	Jędrzej Skiba	Martyna Zygadło^{2}	Anna Małek	Sylwia Wysocka	Michał Matuszewski^{1}
Urszula Dudziak	Maja Mędrek	Monika Morka	~~Michał Bober~~	Magda Lasota	Robert Wojciechowski
Urszula Dudziak	Juliusz Nyk	Małgorzata Migros	Marcelina Lech		
Tomson & Baron					
Tomson & Baron	Adam Kalinowski	Natalia Szczypuła	Bartek Utracki	Michał Bober	Hamza Aboumachaar
Tomson & Baron	Piotr Wolski	Mateusz Wojkowski	~~Przemek Pajdak~~	Agata Wyszyńska	Michalina Lipińska
Tomson & Baron	Violetta Dzigman	Tomasz Besser	Julianna Olańska		

== Blind auditions ==
✔	Coach hit his/her "I WANT YOU" button
	Artist defaulted to this coach's team
	Artist elected to join this coach's team
	Artist eliminated with no coach pressing his or her "I WANT YOU" button
✘	Coach pressed the "I WANT YOU" button, but was blocked by Edyta from getting the artist
✘	Coach pressed the "I WANT YOU" button, but was blocked by Michał from getting the artist
✘	Coach pressed the "I WANT YOU" button, but was blocked by Ula from getting the artist
✘	Coach pressed the "I WANT YOU" button, but was blocked by Tomson & Baron from getting the artist

=== Episode 1 (September 12, 2020) ===
Order	Artist	Age	Song	Coach's and contestant's choices			
Order	Artist	Age	Song	Edyta	Michał	Ula	Tomson & Baron
1	Natalia Szczypuła	31	Beautiful Trauma	✔	✔	✔	✔
2	Kacper Grzelak	27	Have You Ever Seen the Rain?	—	—	—	—
3	Krystian Ochman	20	Beneath Your Beautiful	✔	✔	—	—
4	Anna Nadkierniczna	21	Ostatni	✔	—	—	—
5	Maja Mędrek	21	Love on the Brain	—	—	✔	✔
6	Mikołaj Macioszczyk	28	In My Blood	✔	✔	✔	✔

=== Episode 2 (September 12, 2020) ===
Order	Artist	Age	Song	Coach's and contestant's choices			
Order	Artist	Age	Song	Edyta	Michał	Ula	Tomson & Baron
1	Justyna Jarząbek	25	Trudno mi się przyznać	✔	✔	—	—
2	Ignacy Błażejowski	16	I See Fire	✔	✔	—	—
3	Mateusz Wojkowski	29	Send Me An Angel	✘	✔	✔	✔
4	Inez Nguyen Ngoc	20	Harder	—	—	—	—
5	Mateusz Psonak	30	Have You Ever Seen the Rain?	✔	✔	✔	—
6	Michał Matuszewski	25	Zacznij od Bacha	✔	✔	✔	✔

=== Episode 3 (September 19, 2020) ===
Order	Artist	Age	Song	Coach's and contestant's choices			
Order	Artist	Age	Song	Edyta	Michał	Ula	Tomson & Baron
1	Katarzyna Szulc	19	Preach	—	✔	—	—
2	Piotr Wolski	28	Faith	—	—	✔	✔
3	Tomasz Besser	29	Do kołyski	✔	—	—	✔
4	Anna Serafińska	32	Gołębi puch	✔	✔	✔	✘
5	Joanna Kaczmarek	25	Love Me Like You Do	—	—	—	—
6	Przemysław Pajdak	30	Are You Gonna Be My Girl	✔	✔	✔	✔

=== Episode 4 (September 19, 2020) ===
Order	Artist	Age	Song	Coach's and contestant's choices			
Order	Artist	Age	Song	Edyta	Michał	Ula	Tomson & Baron
1	Monika Morka	24	At Last	—	✔	✔	✔
2	Adam Kalinowski	28	Natural	—	✔	—	✔
3	Karina Mirkowska	36	Came Here for Love	—	—	—	—
4	Natalia Cwajna	21	Do Kołyski	✔	✔	—	—
5	Alicja Witomska	23	Melodia Ulotna	—	—	—	—
6	Milena Gawin	17	Przemija Uroda w Nas	—	—	—	—
7	Jędrzej Skiba	25	Adore You	✔	✘	✔	—

=== Episode 5 (September 26, 2020) ===
Order	Artist	Age	Song	Coach's and contestant's choices			
Order	Artist	Age	Song	Edyta	Michał	Ula	Tomson & Baron
1	Juliusz Nyk	38	Proud Mary	—	—	✔	—
2	Maja Czupryniak	27	Dance Monkey	—	—	—	—
3	Michał Bober	36	1000 metrów nad ziemią	✔	—	✔	—
4	Aleksandra Matyka	17	To nie ja!	✔	—	—	—
5	Katarzyna Miętek	23	Don't You Remember	—	—	—	—
6	Bartosz Utracki	26	Aura	✔	—	—	✔
7	Julianna Olańska	28	Hej, hej	✔	✔	✔	✔

=== Episode 6 (September 26, 2020) ===
Order	Artist	Age	Song	Coach's and contestant's choices			
Order	Artist	Age	Song	Edyta	Michał	Ula	Tomson & Baron
1	Sylwia Wysocka	28	Don't Call Me Up	✔	—	✔	—
2	Angelika Kiepura	29	Lifted	✔	—	✔	—
3	Tomasz Kijewski	40	Send Me an Angel	—	—	—	—
4	Maja Szkutnik	20	Moje Serce To Jest Muzyk	—	—	—	—
5	Maciej Wójcikowski	29	A Whiter Shade of Pale	—	✔	✔	—
6	Karolina Matej	20	Love Me like You Do	—	—	—	—
7	Robert Wojciechowski	28	Before You Go	✔	✔	✔	✘

=== Episode 7 (October 3, 2020) ===
Order	Artist	Age	Song	Coach's and contestant's choices			
Order	Artist	Age	Song	Edyta	Michał	Ula	Tomson & Baron
1	Anna Malek	30	I Want to Know What Love Is	✔	✔	✘	—
2	Michał Cywiński	32	Luźno	✔	—	—	—
3	Martyna Zygadło	17	Bust Your Windows	—	—	✔	—
4	Agata Wyszyńska	37	Nie Żałuje	✔	✔	—	✔
5	Rafał Gębski	24	Dla Ciebie	—	—	—	—
6	Szymon Czyżewski	21	If I Can't Have You	—	✔	—	—
7	Michalina Lipińska	21	Listen to Your Heart	✔	—	✔	✔

=== Episode 8 (October 3, 2020) ===
Order	Artist	Age	Song	Coach's and contestant's choices			
Order	Artist	Age	Song	Edyta	Michał	Ula	Tomson & Baron
1	Monika Miedzianowska	30	Słucham Cię w Radiu Co Tydzień	—	✔	—	—
2	Miłosz Mogielski	17	Dive	✔	✔	—	—
3	Wioletta Dzigman	30	At Last	✔	✔	✔	✔
4	Sebastian Brejnak	26	Here Comes the Sun	—	—	—	—
5	Marcelina Lech	24	A Woman's Worth	—	—	✔	—
6	Agata Ćwik	29	Always Remember Us This Way	—	—	—	—
7	Wojciech Lechończak	28	In My Bones	✔	✔	—	—

=== Episode 9 (October 10, 2020) ===
Order	Artist	Age	Song	Coach's and contestant's choices			
Order	Artist	Age	Song	Edyta	Michał	Ula	Tomson & Baron
1	Anna Gąsienica-Byrcyn	21	Jesteś lekiem na całe zło	✔	—	✔	—
2	Małgorzata Mirgos	27	Angel	—	—	✔	—
3	Kasia Miernik-Jeremias	37	I Was Here	✔	✘	—	—
4	Ada Nikelewska	32	I Love Rock 'n' Roll	—	—	—	—
5	Paweł Sznajder	19	Dive	✔	✔	✔	—
6	Joanna Gawrońska	18	Zakryj	—	—	—	—
7	Magdalena Ćwiertnia	20	One Last Time	✔	✘	✘	✔

=== Episode 10 (October 10, 2020) ===
Order	Artist	Age	Song	Coach's and contestant's choices			
Order	Artist	Age	Song	Edyta	Michał	Ula	Tomson & Baron
1	Marta Bielawska	18	Dance Monkey	✔	—	✔	—
2	Alicja Osuch	20	Melodia	—	—	—	—
3	Hamza Aboumaachar	26	Stay	✔	✔	✔	✔
4	Aleksandra Jabłonka	32	Sweet but Psycho	—	—	—	—
5	Magdalena Lasota	29	A Woman's Worth	—	—	✔	✔
6	Damian Kikoła	29	Czułe miejsce	—	—	—	—
7	Weronika Szymańska	24	7 Years	✔	✔	✔	✔

== The Battle Rounds ==
Color keys

Artist won the Battle and advances to the Knockouts
Artist lost the Battle but was stolen by another coach and advances to the Knockouts
Artist lost the Battle and was stolen by another coach, but was later switched with another artist and eliminated
Artist lost the Battle and was eliminated

Episode & Date	Coach	Order	Winner	Song	Loser	'Steal' result			
Episode & Date	Coach	Order	Winner	Song	Loser	Edyta	Michał	Ula	Tomson & Baron
Episode 11 (October 17)	Michał Szpak	1	Mateusz Psonak	Sobie i Wam	Monika Miedziankowska	—	—N/a	—	—
Episode 11 (October 17)	Edyta Górniak	2	Ola Matyka	I'll Never Love Again	Natalia Cwajna	—N/a	✔	✔	—
Episode 11 (October 17)	Urszula Dudziak	3	Sylwia Wysocka	Pogoda Ducha	Magda Lasota	—	—	—N/a	✔
Episode 11 (October 17)	Tomson & Baron	4	Hamza Aboumaachar	I Just Can't Stop Loving You	Michalina Lipińska	✔	—	—	—N/a
Episode 11 (October 17)	Edyta Górniak	5	Anna Nadkierniczna	Hej Wy	Kasia Miernik-Jeremias	—N/a	—	✔	—
Episode 11 (October 17)	Urszula Dudziak	6	Martyna Zygadło	Respect	Marcelina Lech	—	—	—N/a	—
Episode 11 (October 17)	Tomson & Baron	7	Piotr Wolski	Kochać	Agata Wyszyńska	—	✔	—	—N/a
Episode 11 (October 17)	Michał Szpak	8	Szymon Czyżewski	The Lazy Song	Paweł Sznajder	—	—N/a	—	✔
Episode 12 (October 24)	Tomson & Baron	1	Adam Kalinowski	Legendary	Przemysław Pajdak	✔	✔	✔	—N/a
Episode 12 (October 24)	Urszula Dudziak	2	Maja Mędrek	Zanim zrozumiesz	Małgorzata Mirgos	—	—	—N/a	—
Episode 12 (October 24)	Edyta Górniak	3	Anna Gąsienica-Byrcyn	A Natural Woman	Magdalena Ćwiertnia	—N/a	✔	✔	✔
Episode 12 (October 24)	Michał Szpak	4	Katarzyna Szulc	Wszystko czego dziś chcę	Justyna Jarząbek	—	—N/a	—	—
Episode 12 (October 24)	Urszula Dudziak	5	Monika Morka	I Got You Babe	Juliusz Nyk	—	—	—N/a	—
Episode 12 (October 24)	Tomson & Baron	6	Bartosz Utracki	Miłość Miłość	Julianna Olańska	—	—	—	—N/a
Episode 12 (October 24)	Edyta Górniak	7	Ignacy Błażejowski	Jak gdyby nic	Miłosz Mogielski	—N/a	—	—	—
Episode 12 (October 24)	Michał Szpak	8	Wojciech Lechończak	Never Too Much	Maciej Wójcikowski	✔	—N/a	—	—
Episode 13 (October 31)	Tomson & Baron	1	Mateusz Wojkowski	Livin' On A Prayer	Tomasz Besser	—	—	—	—N/a
Episode 13 (October 31)	Edyta Górniak	2	Marta Bielawska	Nic do stracenia	Michał Cywiński	—N/a	—	—	—
Episode 13 (October 31)	Michał Szpak	3	Krystian Ochman	Lovely	Weronika Szymańska	—	—N/a	—	✔
Episode 13 (October 31)	Urszula Dudziak	4	Michał Matuszewski	Bądź moim natchnieniem	Michał Bober	✔	—	—N/a	✔
Episode 13 (October 31)	Edyta Górniak	5	Anna Serafińska	We Don't Need Another Hero	Angelika Kiepura	—N/a	—	—	—
Episode 13 (October 31)	Michał Szpak	6	Mikołaj Macioszczyk	Cry To Me	Anna Malek	—	—N/a	✔	—
Episode 13 (October 31)	Urszula Dudziak	7	Jędrzej Skiba	Let It Go	Robert Wojciechowski	—	—	—N/a	—
Episode 13 (October 31)	Tomson & Baron	8	Natalia Szczypuła	It's A Man's Man's Man's World	Viola Dzigman	—	—	—	—N/a

== The Knockout Round ==
=== Episode 14 (November 7, 2020) ===
Knockouts took place on 7 November 2020.

Color keys

Contestant was not switched out and advanced to the Live Shows
Contestant was eliminated, either immediately (indicated by a "—" in the "Switched with" column) or switched with another contestant

Coach	Order	Artist	Song	Result	Switched with
Tomson & Baron	1	Natalia Szczypuła	Next to me	Advanced	N/A
Tomson & Baron	2	Mateusz Wojkowski	Sailing	Eliminated	N/A
Tomson & Baron	3	Piotr Wolski	Wish You Were Here	Eliminated	N/A
Tomson & Baron	4	Michał Bober	Summer In The City	Advanced	N/A
Tomson & Baron	5	Bartosz Utracki	Zbiór^{1}	Advanced	Piotr Wolski
Tomson & Baron	6	Adam Kalinowski	Someone You Loved	Advanced	Mateusz Wojkowski
Tomson & Baron	7	Hamza Aboumaachar	Spragniony^{2}	Advanced	N/A
Edyta Górniak	1	Anna Gąsienica-Byrcyn	Pocałuj noc	Advanced	N/A
Edyta Górniak	2	Marta Bielawska	The Greatest	Advanced	N/A
Edyta Górniak	3	Ola Matyka	True Colors	Eliminated	N/A
Edyta Górniak	4	Anna Nadkierniczna	Miałeś być	Advanced	N/A
Edyta Górniak	5	Anna Serafińska	Jak Rzecz	Eliminated	N/A
Edyta Górniak	6	Ignacy Błażejowski	Riptide	Advanced	Ola Matyka
Edyta Górniak	7	Maciej Wójcikowski	O Sobie Samym	Eliminated	N/A
Michał Szpak	1	Szymon Czyżewski	Trójkąty i Kwadraty	Eliminated	N/A
Michał Szpak	2	Mikołaj Macioszczyk	Bad Liar	Advanced	N/A
Michał Szpak	3	Przemysław Pajdak	Szczęśliwej Drogi Już Czas	Eliminated	N/A
Michał Szpak	4	Kasia Szulc	Let's Hurt Tonight	Eliminated	N/A
Michał Szpak	5	Krystian Ochman	Z Tobą Chcę Oglądać Świat	Eliminated	Przemysław Pajdak
Michał Szpak	6	Wojciech Lechończak	Hey Brother	Advanced	Kasia Szulc
Michał Szpak	7	Mateusz Psonak	Angie	Advanced	Szymon Czyżewski
Urszula Dudziak	1	Jędrzej Skiba	Thinking Out Loud	Advanced	N/A
Urszula Dudziak	2	Martyna Zygadło	10 Przykazań	Eliminated	N/A
Urszula Dudziak	3	Michał Matuszewski	Jesus to a Child	Advanced	N/A
Urszula Dudziak	4	Monika Morka	Porady Na Zdrady (Dreszcze)	Eliminated	N/A
Urszula Dudziak	5	Anna Malek	I Wish I Didn't Miss You	Advanced	Monika Morka
Urszula Dudziak	6	Maja Mędrek	Flashlight	Eliminated	N/A
Urszula Dudziak	7	Sylwia Wysocka	Przyjdż W Taką Noc	Advanced	Martyna Zygadło

^1 by Baranovski ^2 by Kamil Bednarek

== Live Shows ==
Color keys

Artist was saved by other coaches
Artist was saved by his/her coach
Artist was eliminated

=== Episode 15 (November 14, 2020) ===
Order	Coach	Artist	Song	Result
1	Edyta Górniak	Anna Gąsienica-Byrcyn	All Around The World	Coaches' choice
2	Edyta Górniak	Marta Bielawska	Wolves	Eliminated
3	Edyta Górniak	Anna Nadkierniczna	Sunrise	Coaches' choice
4	Edyta Górniak	Ignacy Błażejowski	Dla Mamy	Edyta's choice
1	Michał Szpak	Mikołaj Macioszczyk	We Are The People	Coaches' choice
2	Michał Szpak	Krystian Ochman	All by Myself	Coaches' choice
3	Michał Szpak	Wojciech Lechończak	Nie stało się nic	Eliminated
4	Michał Szpak	Mateusz Psonak	Krakowski Spleen	Michał's choice
1	Urszula Dudziak	Jędrzej Skiba	Stop and Stare	Coaches' choice
2	Urszula Dudziak	Anna Malek	Earth Song	Coaches' choice
3	Urszula Dudziak	Sylwia Wysocka	Szał	Eliminated
4	Urszula Dudziak	Martyna Zygadło^{1}	When You Believe	Ula's choice
1	Tomson & Baron	Natalia Szczypuła	As	Coaches' choice
2	Tomson & Baron	Michał Bober	O Niebo Lepiej	Eliminated
3	Tomson & Baron	Bartosz Utracki	The Scientist	Tomson & Baron's choice
4	Tomson & Baron	Adam Kalinowski	In the End	Coaches' choice

^1 - Due to the detection of the COVID-19 virus, artist Michał Matuszewski had to resign from the next stage of the program. The production of the program decided to restore artist Martyna Zygadło, who was dropped out in the Nokaut episode in place of Michał Matuszewski.

=== Episode 16 - Quarter-Final (November 21, 2020) ===
Order	Coach	Artist	Song	Result
1	Edyta Górniak	Ignacy Błażejowski	While My Guitar Gently Weeps	Eliminated
2	Edyta Górniak	Anna Nadkierniczna	Łatwopalni	Coaches' choice
3	Edyta Górniak	Anna Gąsienica-Byrcyn	You Know I'm No Good	Edyta's choice
1	Michał Szpak	Mateusz Psonak	Hotel California	Eliminated
2	Michał Szpak	Krystian Ochman	Tylko poproś mnie do tańca	Michał's choice
3	Michał Szpak	Mikołaj Macioszczyk	Chciałem być	Coaches' choice
1	Urszula Dudziak	Jędrzej Skiba	Watermelon Sugar	Ula's choice
2	Urszula Dudziak	Anna Malek	Ruchome Piaski	Eliminated
3	Urszula Dudziak	Martyna Zygadło	River Deep – Mountain High	Coaches' choice
1	Tomson & Baron	Adam Kalinowski	Nothing Compares 2 U	Tomson & Baron's choice
2	Tomson & Baron	Natalia Szczypuła	Survivor	Coaches' choice
3	Tomson & Baron	Bartosz Utracki	Somewhere Only We Know	Eliminated

=== Episode 17 - Semifinal (November 28, 2020) ===
Order	Coach	Artist	Cover Song	Original Song	Result
Edyta Górniak	1	Anna Gąsienica-Byrcyn	Because of You	Nocą	Advanced
Edyta Górniak	2	Anna Nadkierniczna	A Thousand Years	Za Jakiś czas	Eliminated
Michał Szpak	1	Krystian Ochman	The Sound of Silence	Światłocienie	Advanced
Michał Szpak	2	Mikołaj Macioszczyk	Małomiasteczkowy	Fala	Eliminated
Urszula Dudziak	1	Jędrzej Skiba	Time Is Running Out	Dogonić	Advanced
Urszula Dudziak	2	Martyna Zygadło	Aleja Gwiazd	Zapamiętaj Mnie	Eliminated
Tomson & Baron	1	Adam Kalinowski	Dirty Diana	Kamienice	Advanced
Tomson & Baron	2	Natalia Szczypuła	Who You Are	Z Tobą	Eliminated

=== Episode 18 - Final (December 5, 2020) ===
Order	Coach	Artist	Song		Result
1	Michał Szpak	Krystian Ochman	Duet with coach	My Way	Winner
1	Michał Szpak	Krystian Ochman	English song	Frozen	Winner
1	Michał Szpak	Krystian Ochman	Polish song	Nie Czekaj Mnie w Argentynie	Winner
1	Michał Szpak	Krystian Ochman	Original song	Światłocienie	Winner
2	Tomson & Baron	Adam Kalinowski	Duet with coach	Drive	Runner-up
2	Tomson & Baron	Adam Kalinowski	English song	Still Got the Blues	Runner-up
2	Tomson & Baron	Adam Kalinowski	Polish song	Za Szkłem	Runner-up
2	Tomson & Baron	Adam Kalinowski	Original song	Kamienice	Runner-up
3	Edyta Górniak	Anna Gąsienica-Byrcyn	Duet with coach	Rolling in the Deep	Third Place
3	Edyta Górniak	Anna Gąsienica-Byrcyn	English song	One Night Only	Third Place
3	Edyta Górniak	Anna Gąsienica-Byrcyn	Polish song	Do Kiedy Jestem	Third Place
3	Edyta Górniak	Anna Gąsienica-Byrcyn	Original song	—N/a	Third Place
4	Urszula Dudziak	Jędrzej Skiba	Duet with coach	Virtual Insanity	Fourth Place
4	Urszula Dudziak	Jędrzej Skiba	English song	All I Want	Fourth Place
4	Urszula Dudziak	Jędrzej Skiba	Polish song	—N/a	Fourth Place
4	Urszula Dudziak	Jędrzej Skiba	Original song	—N/a	Fourth Place

== Results summary of live shows ==
=== Overall ===
Color keys
Artist's info

- Artist from Team Tomson & Baron
- Artist from Team Michał Szpak
- Artist from Team Edyta Górniak
- Artist from Team Urszula Dudziak

Result details

- Artist was proclaimed as winner
- Artist was proclaimed as runner-up
- Artist was proclaimed as third place
- Artist was proclaimed as fourth place
- Artist advanced to the finals
- Artist was saved by his/her coach
- Artist was saved by the points given by coaches
- Artist received the fewest accumulated total points and was eliminated
- Artist received the fewest of the coaches points and was eliminated

Live show results per week
Artist	Week 1	Week 2	Week 3	Finals
Krystian Ochman	Safe	Safe	Advanced	Winner
Adam Kalinowski	Safe	Safe	Advanced	Runner-Up
Anna Gąsienica - Byrcyn	Safe	Safe	Advanced	3rd Place
Jędrzej Skiba	Safe	Safe	Advanced	4th Place
Martyna Zygadło	Safe	Safe	Eliminated	Eliminated (Week 3)
Mikołaj Macioszczyk	Safe	Safe	Eliminated	Eliminated (Week 3)
Anna Nadkierniczna	Safe	Safe	Eliminated	Eliminated (Week 3)
Natalia Szczypuła	Safe	Safe	Eliminated	Eliminated (Week 3)
Bartek Utracki	Safe	Eliminated	Eliminated (Week 2)	
Mateusz Psonak	Safe	Eliminated	Eliminated (Week 2)	
Ignacy Błażejowski	Safe	Eliminated	Eliminated (Week 2)	
Anna Małek	Safe	Eliminated	Eliminated (Week 2)	
Marta Bielawska	Eliminated	Eliminated (Week 1)		
Michał Bober	Eliminated	Eliminated (Week 1)		
Wojciech Lechończak	Eliminated	Eliminated (Week 1)		
Sylwia Wysocka	Eliminated	Eliminated (Week 1)		

=== Team ===
Artist's info

- Artist from Team Edyta Górniak
- Artist from Team Urszula Dudziak
- Artist from Team Michał Szpak
- Artist from Team Tomson & Baron

Result details

- Winner
- Runner-up
- Third place
- Fourth Place
- Artist advanced to the finals
- Artist was saved by his/her coach
- Artist was saved by the points given by coaches
- Artist was eliminated

Live show results per week
Artist	Live Shows			
Artist	Week 1	Week 2	Week 3	Finals
Anna Gąsienica - Byrcyn	Saved by Points	Coach's choice	Advanced to the Finals	Third Place
Ania Nadkierniczna	Saved by Points	Saved by Points	Eliminated	
Ignacy Błażejowski	Coach's choice	Eliminated		
Marta Bielawska	Eliminated			
Jędrzej Skiba	Saved by Points	Coach's choice	Advanced to the Finals	Fourth Place
Martyna Zygadło	Coach's choice	Saved by Points	Eliminated	
Anna Małek	Saved by Points	Eliminated		
Sylwia Wysocka	Eliminated			
Krystian Ochman	Saved by Points	Coach's choice	Advanced to the Finals	Winner
Mikołaj Macioszczyk	Saved by Points	Saved by Points	Eliminated	
Mateusz Psonak	Coach's choice	Eliminated		
Wojciech Lechończak	Eliminated			
Adam Kalinowski	Saved by Points	Coach's choice	Advanced to the Finals	Runner-up
Natalia Szczypuła	Saved by Points	Saved by Points	Eliminated	
Bartek Utracki	Coach's choice	Eliminated		
Michał Bober	Eliminated			
