= The Voice of Poland season 10 =

The Voice of Poland
- Season 10
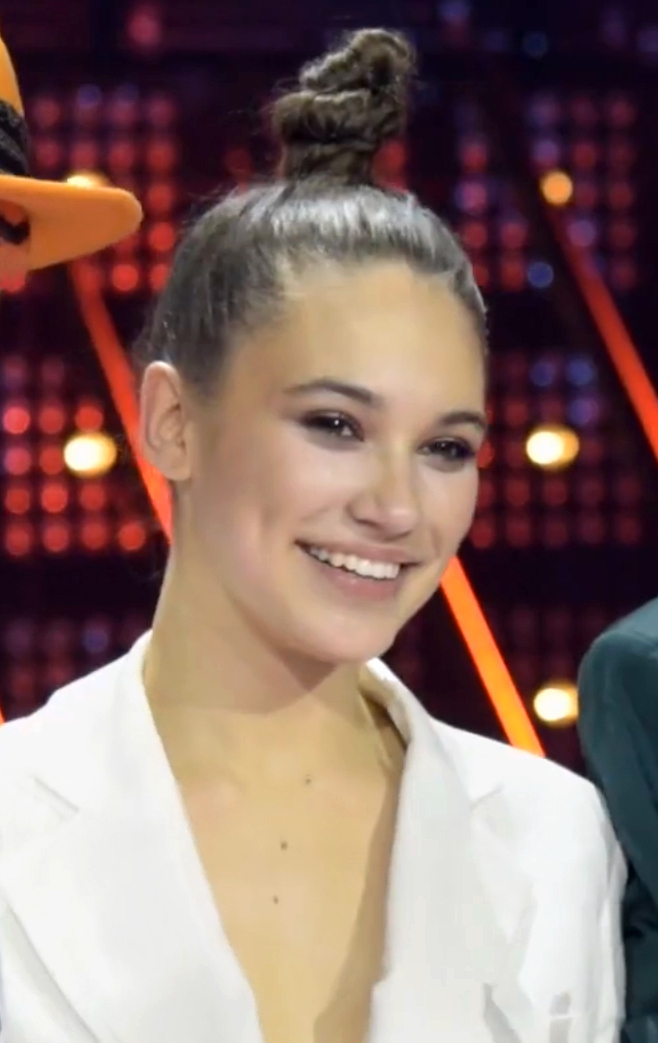
- Hosted by: Tomasz Kammel; Marcelina Zawadzka; Maciej Musiał
- Judges: Michał Szpak; Tomson & Baron; Margaret; Kamil Bednarek
- Winner: Alicja Szemplińska
- Winning coach: Tomson & Baron
- Runner-up: Daria Reczek

Release
- Original network: TVP2
- Original release: September 7 – November 30, 2019

Season chronology
- ← Previous; Season 9 Next → Season 11

The tenth season of The Voice of Poland began airing on 7 September 2019 on TVP 2. It aired on Saturdays at 20:05 and 21:10.

For the second season in a row the coaching lineup was changed heavily with only Michał Szpak remaining as a coach for his third consecutive season. After only a year off Tomson & Baron returned for their eighth season while the other two coaches Kamil Bednarek and Margaret debuted on the show.

Alicja Szemplińska won the competition, marking Tomson & Baron's first win as a coach.

== Coaches and hosts ==
On July 9, 2019, it was announced that Mam talent! runner-up Kamil Bednarek would become a new coach and the first coach to be announced for season 10. A week later, along with the announcement of the jury for The Voice Kids and The Voice Senior, it was confirmed that Margaret would also be joining the show as a new coach, alongside returning coaches Michał Szpak and Tomson & Baron. Meanwhile, Marcelina Zawadzka replaced Barbara Kurdej-Szatan as the show's new host, alongside returning presenter Tomasz Kammel and Maciej Musiał.

Coaches and Hosts gallery

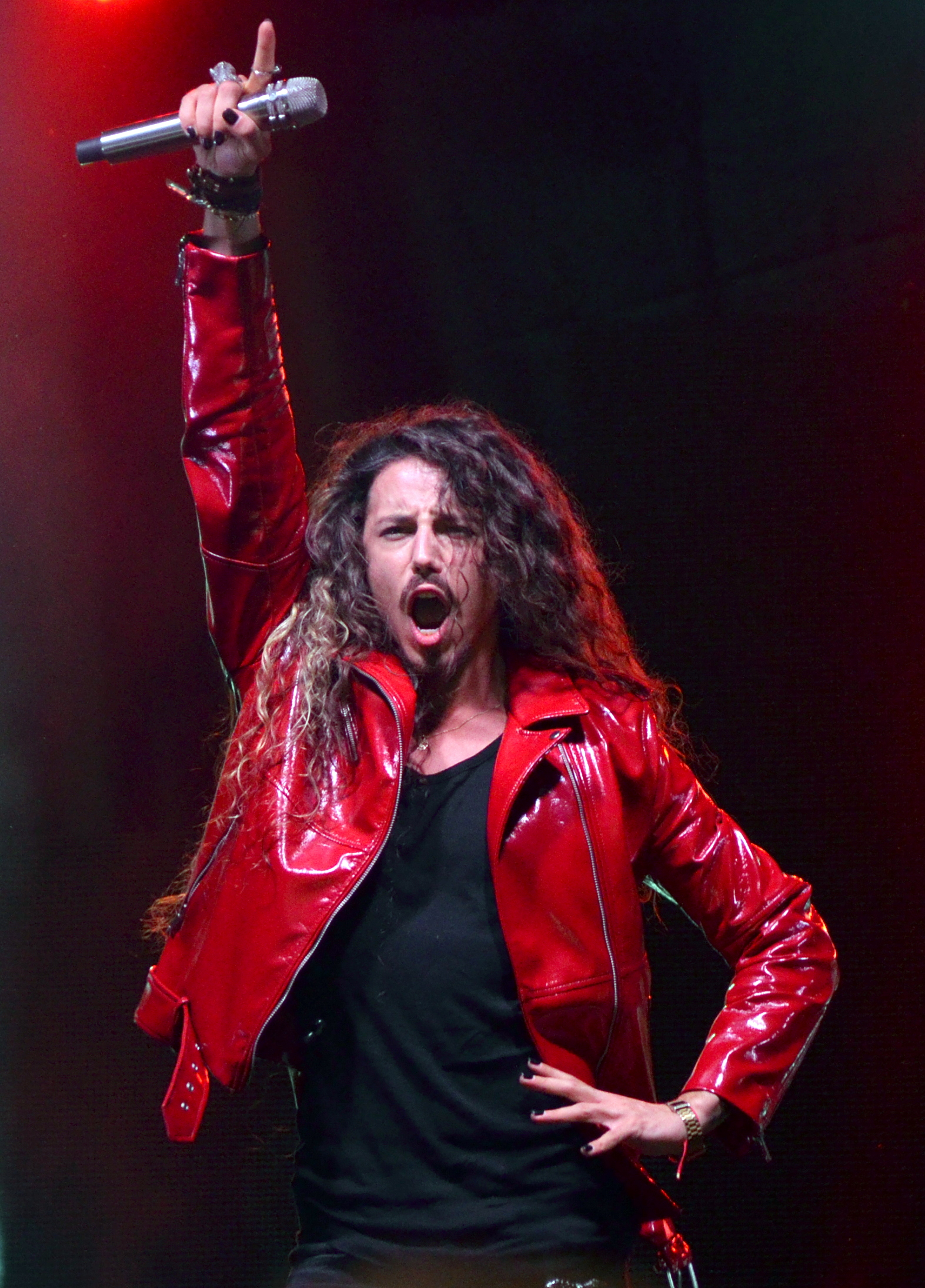
Michał Szpak

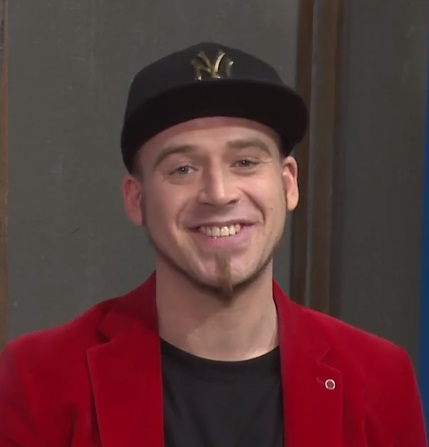
Tomasz Lach (duo)

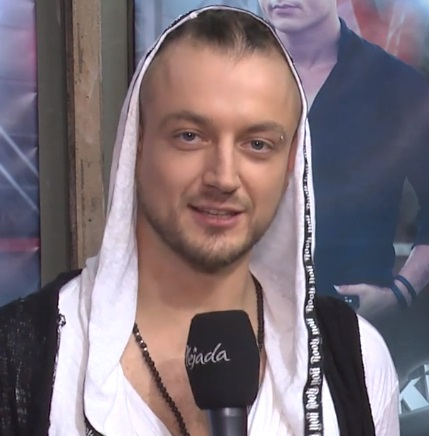
Aleksandr Milwiw-Baron (duo)

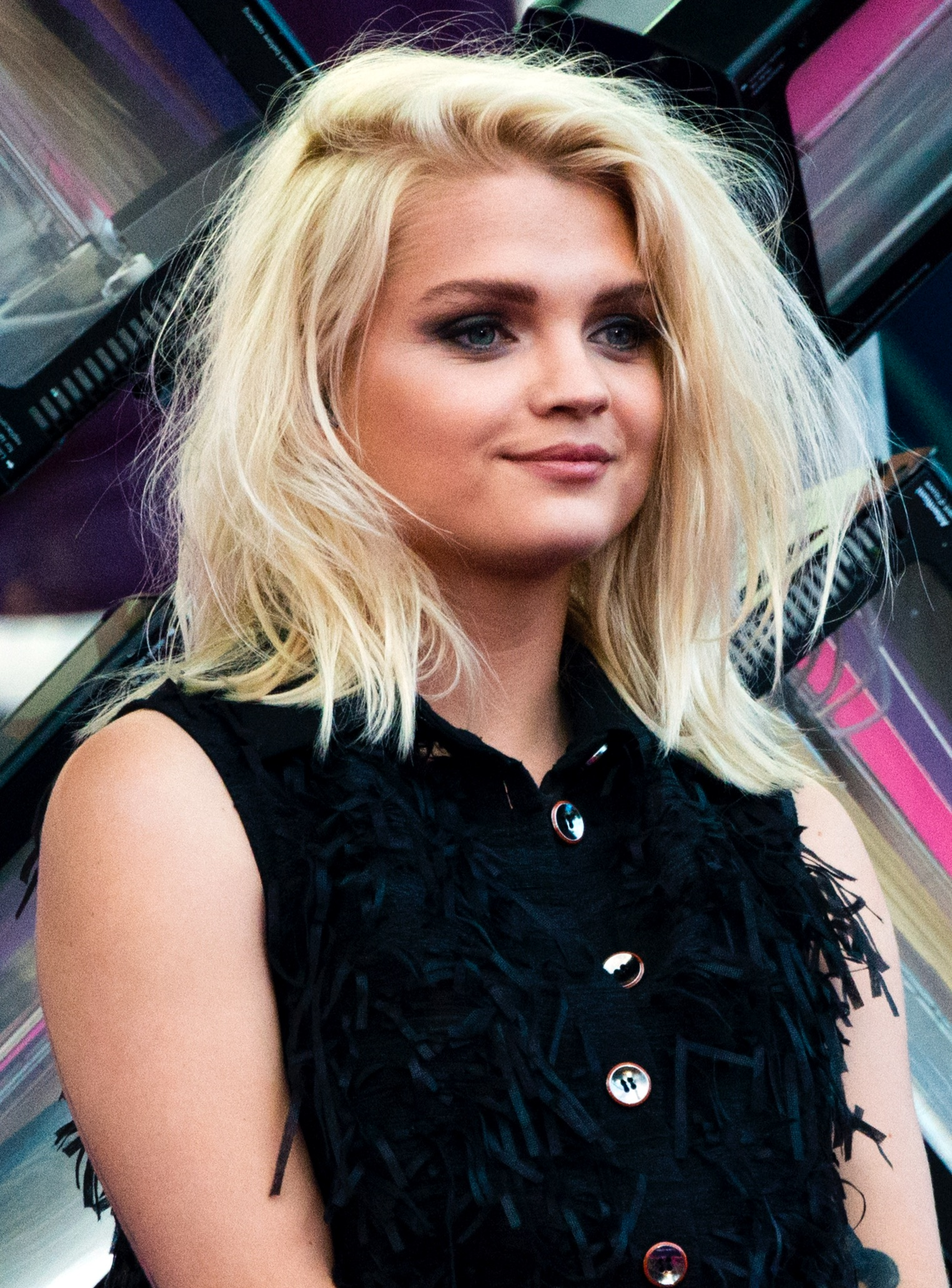
Margaret

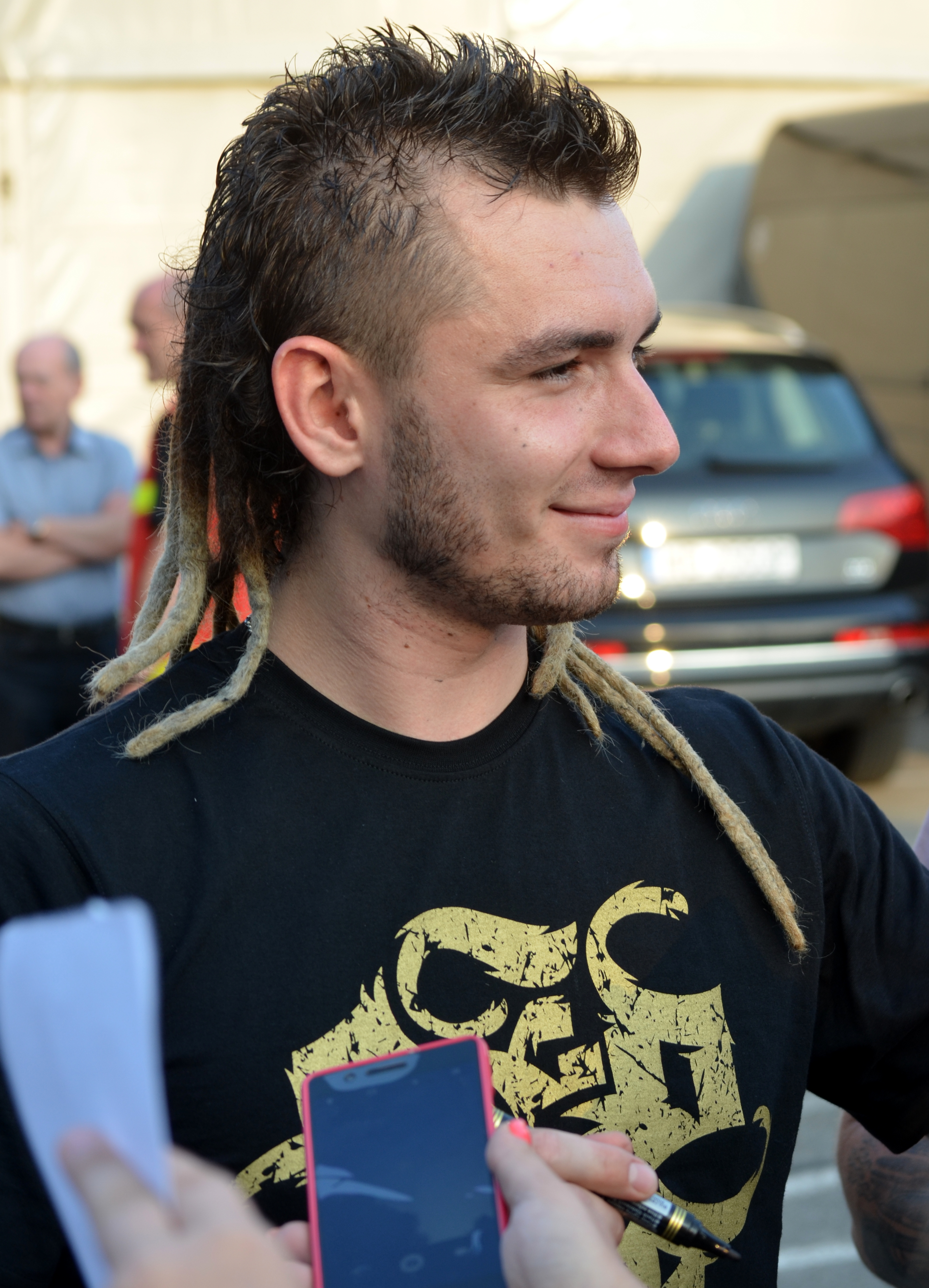
Kamil Bednarek

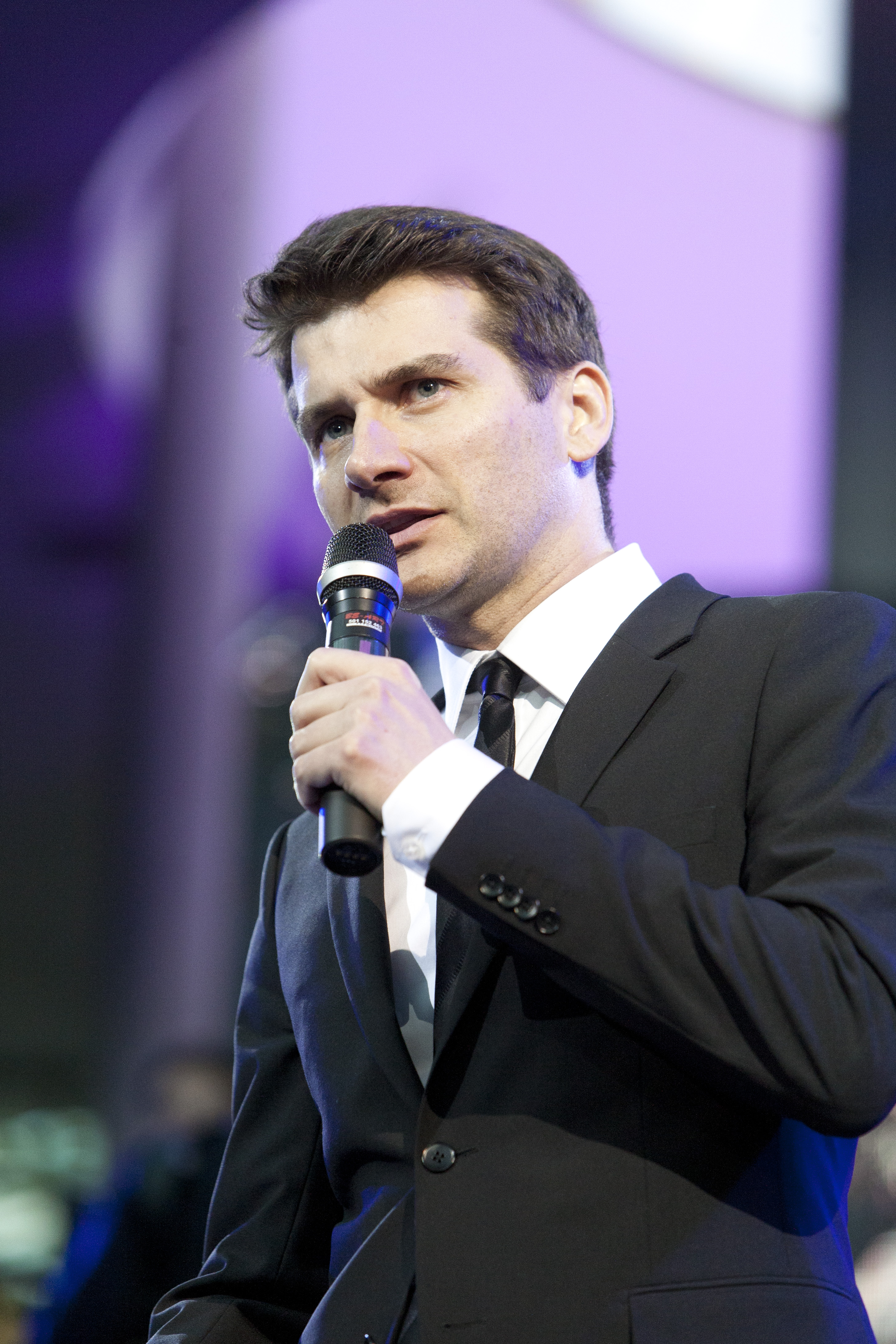
Tomasz Kammel

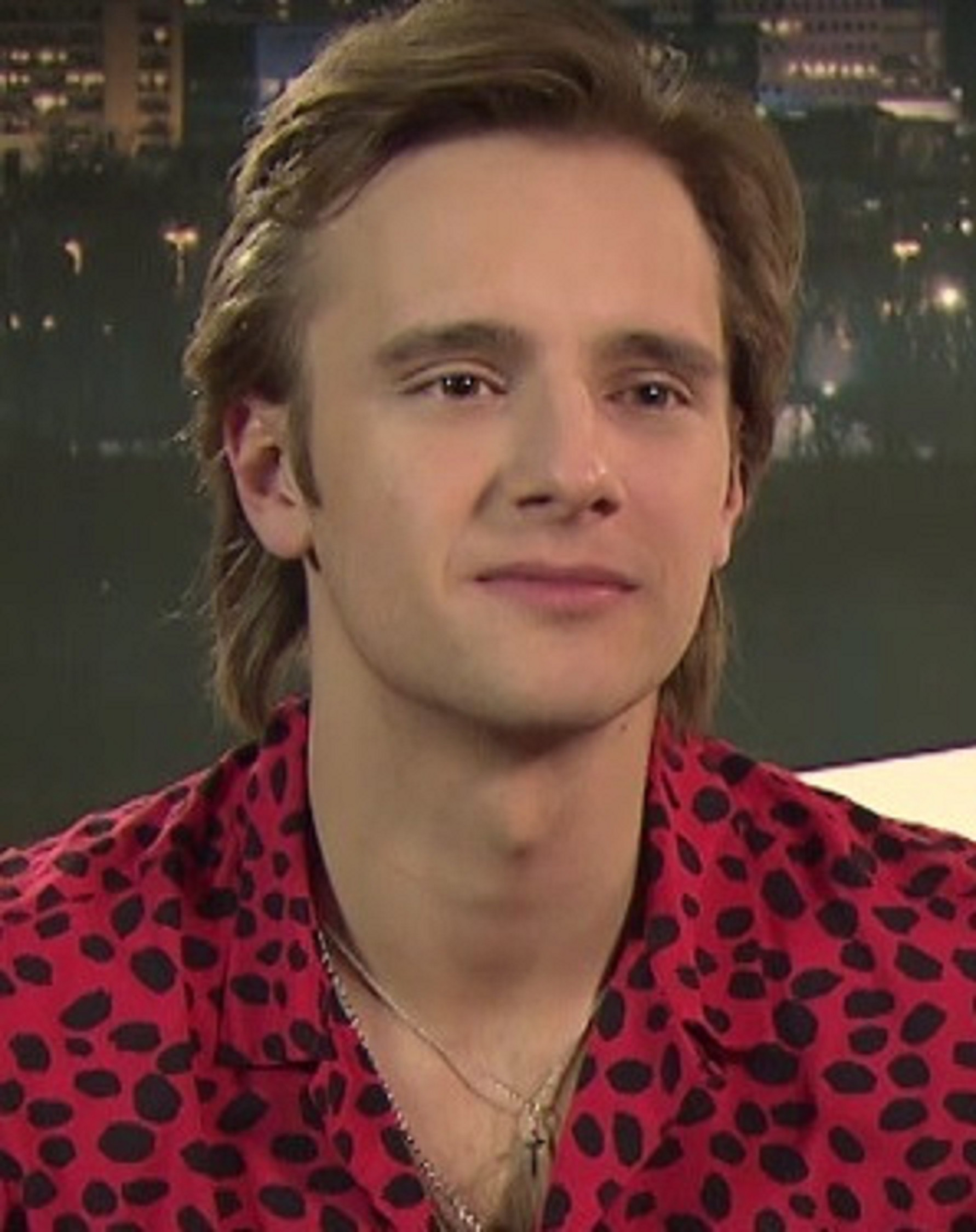
Maciej Musiał

== Teams ==
Color key

- Winner
- Runner-up
- Third place
- Fourth place
- Eliminated in the Live 3 (Semifinals)
- Eliminated in the Live 2 (Quarterfinals 2)
- Eliminated in the Live 1 (Quarterfinals 1)
- Eliminated in the Knockout round
- Artist was stolen by another coach (Name is strikethroughed)
- Artist was stolen but was later switched with another artist and got eliminated
- Eliminated in the Battle rounds

| Coaches | Top 48 artists | | | | |
|---|---|---|---|---|---|
| Michał Szpak | | | | | |
| Michał Szpak | Daria Reczek | Jakub Dąbrowski | Piotr Szewczyk | Magdalena Ollar | Filip Czyżykowski |
| Michał Szpak | Violet Oliferuk | Marzena Ryt | ~~Sonia Michalczuk~~ | Oliwia Socha | Karolina Wiśniewska |
| Michał Szpak | Jakub Zajączkowski | Dagmara Latosińska | Julia Mróz | | |
| Tomson & Baron | | | | | |
| Tomson & Baron | Alicja Szemplińska | Bartosz Deryło | Patryk Żywczyk | Adrian Burek | Klaudia Kowalik |
| Tomson & Baron | Agnieszka Smoleń | Mikołaj Macioszczyk | ~~Daria Reczek~~ | Sylwia Różycka | Jakub Deka |
| Tomson & Baron | Weronika Kozłowska | Karol Olszewski | Magdalena Panek | | |
| Margaret | | | | | |
| Margaret | Tadeusz Seibert | Stanisław Ślęzak | Sonia Michalczuk | Sonia Hornatkiewicz | Iwona Kmiecik |
| Margaret | Zofia Marcinkowska | Karolina Wójtowicz | ~~Martyna Kowalik~~ | Rafał Chmiel | Kacper Fułek |
| Margaret | Arnold Kłymkiw | Daria Marcinkowska | Jakub Proch | | |
| Kamil Bednarek | | | | | |
| Kamil Bednarek | Damian Kulej | Kasjan Cieśla | Julia Olędzka | Ada Nasiadka | Paulina & Bartek Gruszeccy |
| Kamil Bednarek | Kalina De Roover | Martyna Kowalik | ~~Mikołaj Macioszczyk~~ | Jerzy Gmurzyński | Justyna Kakiet |
| Kamil Bednarek | Natalia Kapturkowska | Daria Kowolik | Edyta Pilarska | | |

== Blind auditions ==
Color keys

| ✔ | Coach hit his/her "I WANT YOU" button |
| | Artist defaulted to this coach's team |
| | Artist elected to join this coach's team |
| | Artist eliminated with no coach pressing his or her "I WANT YOU" button |
| | Artist received an 'All Turn'. |

=== Episode 1 (September 7, 2019) ===
| Order | Artist | Age | Song | Coach's and contestant's choices | | | |
| Order | Artist | Age | Song | Michał | Tomson & Baron | Margaret | Kamil |
|---|---|---|---|---|---|---|---|
| 1 | Karol Olszewski | 26 | Like I Love You | ✔ | ✔ | ✔ | ✔ |
| 2 | Karolina Wójtowicz | 17 | Shallow | — | ✔ | ✔ | ✔ |
| 3 | Wiktoria Bialic | 19 | Say You Won't Let Go | — | — | — | — |
| 4 | Daria Kowolik | 22 | Bad Day | — | ✔ | — | ✔ |
| 5 | Alicja Szemplińska | 17 | Scars to Your Beautiful | ✔ | ✔ | ✔ | ✔ |

=== Episode 2 (September 7, 2019) ===
| Order | Artist | Age | Song | Coach's and contestant's choices | | | |
| Order | Artist | Age | Song | Michał | Tomson & Baron | Margaret | Kamil |
|---|---|---|---|---|---|---|---|
| 1 | Dagmara Latosińska | 32 | Nie wierz mi, nie ufaj mi^{1} | ✔ | — | — | — |
| 2 | Kacper Fułek | 25 | I Wanna Dance with Somebody (Who Loves Me) | ✔ | — | ✔ | ✔ |
| 3 | Mikołaj Macioszczyk | 27 | Power Over Me | — | — | ✔ | ✔ |
| 4 | Kamil Krawczyk | 23 | Man of the Woods | — | — | — | — |
| 5 | Magdalena Ollar | 37 | Dziesięć przykazań^{2} | ✔ | ✔ | — | — |

=== Episode 3 (September 7, 2019) ===
| Order | Artist | Age | Song | Coach's and contestant's choices | | | |
| Order | Artist | Age | Song | Michał | Tomson & Baron | Margaret | Kamil |
|---|---|---|---|---|---|---|---|
| 1 | Piotr Szewczyk | 32 | Byłam różą | ✔ | — | — | ✔ |
| 2 | Emilia Witkiewicz | 37 | Giant | — | — | — | — |
| 3 | Damian Kulej | 26 | Pech to nie grzech | ✔ | ✔ | — | ✔ |
| 4 | Angelika Jasińska | 20 | Walk Me Home | — | — | — | — |
| 5 | Natalia Kapturowska | 19 | Let's Hurt Tonight | — | — | — | ✔ |
| 6 | Klaudia Kowalik | 19 | For You | — | ✔ | ✔ | ✔ |
| 7 | Martyna Kowalik | 17 | Supergirl | — | — | ✔ | — |
| 8 | Kasjan Cieśla | 23 | Wystarczę ja | — | ✔ | — | ✔ |
| 9 | Julia Reńda | 20 | Send My Love (To Your New Lover) | — | — | — | — |
| 10 | Daria Reczek | 20 | A Thousand Years | ✔ | ✔ | ✔ | ✔ |

=== Episode 4 (September 14, 2019) ===
| Order | Artist | Age | Song | Coach's and contestant's choices | | | |
| Order | Artist | Age | Song | Michał | Tomson & Baron | Margaret | Kamil |
|---|---|---|---|---|---|---|---|
| 1 | Jakub Zajączkowski | 27 | Bad Liar | ✔ | ✔ | ✔ | ✔ |
| 2 | Julia Mróz | 18 | Sorry Not Sorry | ✔ | ✔ | ✔ | — |
| 3 | Elwira Kropiewnicka | 31 | Ain't No Other Man | — | — | — | — |
| 4 | Rafał Chamiel | 37 | Behind Blue Eyes | — | — | ✔ | ✔ |
| 5 | Julia Olędzka | 25 | I'll Never Love Again | ✔ | — | ✔ | ✔ |

=== Episode 5 (September 14, 2019) ===
| Order | Artist | Age | Song | Coach's and contestant's choices | | | |
| Order | Artist | Age | Song | Michał | Tomson & Baron | Margaret | Kamil |
|---|---|---|---|---|---|---|---|
| 1 | Stanisław Ślęzak | 18 | Us | ✔ | — | ✔ | — |
| 2 | Ewa Urban | 38 | Królowa łez | — | — | — | — |
| 3 | Paulina & Bartek Gruszeccy | 32 & 29 | Lucky | — | — | — | ✔ |
| 4 | Karolina Wiśniewska | 18 | Someone You Loved | ✔ | — | ✔ | — |
| 5 | Patryk Żywczyk | 23 | Way Down We Go | — | ✔ | ✔ | ✔ |

=== Episode 6 (September 14, 2019) ===
| Order | Artist | Age | Song | Coach's and contestant's choices | | | |
| Order | Artist | Age | Song | Michał | Tomson & Baron | Margaret | Kamil |
|---|---|---|---|---|---|---|---|
| 1 | Filip Czyżykowski | 17 | King^{3} | ✔ | ✔ | — | ✔ |
| 2 | Daria Marcinkowska | 23 | Lay Me Down | ✔ | ✔ | ✔ | ✔ |
| 3 | Marzena Rakowska | | Flames | — | — | — | — |
| 4 | Jakob Proch | 24 | Zbiór^{4} | — | ✔ | ✔ | — |
| 5 | Nadine Maria Fredrich | 32 | Angie | — | — | — | — |
| 6 | Justyna Kakiet | 20 | Lush Life | — | — | — | ✔ |
| 7 | Hubert Mróz | 24 | Luźno^{4} | — | — | — | — |
| 8 | Sylwia Różycka | 37 | When You Believe | — | ✔ | — | ✔ |
| 9 | Tadeusz Seibert | 27 | Spragniony^{5} | ✔ | ✔ | ✔ | ✔ |

=== Episode 7 (September 28, 2019) ===
| Order | Artist | Age | Song | Coach's and contestant's choices | | | |
| Order | Artist | Age | Song | Michał | Tomson & Baron | Margaret | Kamil |
|---|---|---|---|---|---|---|---|
| 1 | Edyta Pilarska | 39 | Long Train Runnin' | — | — | — | ✔ |
| 2 | Karol Makuch | 23 | Pomimo burz^{6} | — | — | — | — |
| 3 | Zofia Marcinkowska | 19 | For You | — | — | ✔ | ✔ |
| 4 | Aneta Szymczyk | 26 | Tatuaż^{7} | — | — | — | — |
| 5 | Oliwia Socha | 21 | IDGAF | ✔ | — | ✔ | ✔ |
| 6 | Julia Połynko & Kinga Czeczko | 18 | Mama, I'm Coming Home | — | — | — | — |
| 7 | Adrian Burek | 25 | I Feel Like I'm Drowning | ✔ | ✔ | ✔ | ✔ |

=== Episode 8 (September 28, 2019) ===
| Order | Artist | Age | Song | Coach's and contestant's choices | | | |
| Order | Artist | Age | Song | Michał | Tomson & Baron | Margaret | Kamil |
|---|---|---|---|---|---|---|---|
| 1 | Arnold Kłymkiw | 26 | Autumn Leaves | ✔ | — | ✔ | — |
| 2 | Sonia Michalczuk | 33 | Skin | ✔ | — | ✔ | — |
| 3 | Jowita Kowalewska | 29 | Total Błękit | — | — | — | — |
| 4 | Kalina De Roover | 24 | Thank U, Next | — | — | — | ✔ |
| 5 | Dominik Niklas | 20 | Marry You | — | — | — | — |
| 6 | Jakub Deka | 26 | Bad Day | — | ✔ | — | — |
| 7 | Agnieszka Smoleń | 29 | Love Me Anyway | ✔ | ✔ | ✔ | ✔ |

=== Episode 9 (October 5, 2019) ===
| Order | Artist | Age | Song | Coach's and contestant's choices | | | |
| Order | Artist | Age | Song | Michał | Tomson & Baron | Margaret | Kamil |
|---|---|---|---|---|---|---|---|
| 1 | Ada Nasiadka | 25 | Wild Horses | — | — | ✔ | ✔ |
| 2 | Julia Jasińska | 18 | Girls Like You | — | — | — | — |
| 3 | Weronika Kozłowska | 18 | Chained to the Rhythm | — | ✔ | — | — |
| 4 | Adam Konowalski | 36 | Hej wy^{8} | — | — | — | — |
| 5 | Magdalena Panek | 19 | Shallow | — | ✔ | — | ✔ |
| 6 | Iwona Kmiecik | 35 | Policeman | — | — | ✔ | — |
| 7 | Jakub Dąbrowski | 21 | A Thousand Years | ✔ | ✔ | ✔ | ✔ |

=== Episode 10 (October 5, 2019) ===
| Order | Artist | Age | Song | Coach's and contestant's choices | | | |
| Order | Artist | Age | Song | Michał | Tomson & Baron | Margaret | Kamil |
|---|---|---|---|---|---|---|---|
| 1 | Bartosz Deryło | 21 | Love Me Anyway | ✔ | ✔ | — | ✔ |
| 2 | Violet Oliferuk | 29 | Walk Me Home | ✔ | ✔ | — | — |
| 3 | Jerzy Gmurzyński | 26 | Podróżnik | — | ✔ | ✔ | ✔ |
| 4 | Sonia Hornatkiewicz | 21 | Dear Future Husband | — | — | ✔ | — |
| 5 | Nastya Litvinova | 26 | Przyjdź w taką noc | — | — | — | — |
| 6 | Marzena Ryt | 21 | Nothing Breaks Like a Heart | ✔ | ✔ | ✔ | ✔ |

^1 by Anna Jantar ^2 by Bajm ^3 by T.Love ^4 by Baranovski ^5 by Kamil Bednarek ^6 by Antek Smykiewicz ^7 by Edyta Bartosiewicz ^8 by Kortez

== The Battle Rounds ==
In this season, the stealing system from Season 7 was once again implemented. There is a notable change from this season. From this season, each coach could steal without limit. The battles therefore end with seven participants from each team advancing to the next stage.

Color keys

| Artist won the Battle and advances to the Knockouts |
| Artist lost the Battle but was stolen by another coach and advances to the Knockouts |
| Artist lost the Battle and was stolen by another coach, but was later switched with another artist and eliminated |
| Artist lost the Battle and was eliminated |

| Episode & Date | Coach | Order | Winner | Song | Loser | 'Steal' result | | | |
| Episode & Date | Coach | Order | Winner | Song | Loser | Michał | Tomson & Baron | Margaret | Kamil |
|---|---|---|---|---|---|---|---|---|---|
| Episode 11 (October 12) | Tomson & Baron | 1 | Agnieszka Smoleń | "Dangerous Woman" | Sylwia Różycka | ✔ | —N/a | ✔ | ✔ |
| Episode 11 (October 12) | Michał Szpak | 2 | Magdalena Ollar | "Moja i Twoja Nadzieja"^{1} | Jakub Zajączkowski | —N/a | ✔ | — | — |
| Episode 11 (October 12) | Margaret | 3 | Zofia Marcinkowska | "Just the Two of Us" | Arnold Kłymkiw | ✔ | — | —N/a | — |
| Episode 11 (October 12) | Kamil Bednarek | 4 | Damian Kulej | "Rock&Rollin' Love" | Jerzy Gmurzyński | — | — | ✔ | —N/a |
| Episode 11 (October 12) | Michał Szpak | 5 | Jakub Dąbrowski | "Hold Back the River" | Karolina Wiśniewska | —N/a | — | — | ✔ |
| Episode 11 (October 12) | Tomson & Baron | 6 | Bartosz Deryło | "Napad"^{2} | Jakub Deka | — | —N/a | — | — |
| Episode 11 (October 12) | Kamil Bednarek | 7 | Ada Nasiadka | "Don't Speak" | Justyna Kakiet | — | — | — | —N/a |
| Episode 11 (October 12) | Margaret | 8 | Iwona Kmiecik | "Against All Odds" | Kacper Fułek | ✔ | — | —N/a | — |
| Episode 12 (October 19) | Margaret | 1 | Sonia Hornatkiewicz | "Shackles (Praise You)" | Daria Marcinkowska | — | — | —N/a | — |
| Episode 12 (October 19) | Tomson & Baron | 2 | Adrian Burek | "One" | Weronika Kozłowska | — | —N/a | — | — |
| Episode 12 (October 19) | Michał Szpak | 3 | Violet Oliferuk | "Valerie" | Oliwia Socha | —N/a | — | — | ✔ |
| Episode 12 (October 19) | Kamil Bednarek | 4 | Julia Olędzka | "Set Fire to the Rain" | Natalia Kapturowska | — | — | — | —N/a |
| Episode 12 (October 19) | Michał Szpak | 5 | Filip Czyżykowski | "Gimme Shelter" | Sonia Michalczuk | —N/a | — | ✔ | — |
| Episode 12 (October 19) | Margaret | 6 | Karolina Wójtowicz | "Początek" | Rafał Chmiel | — | ✔ | —N/a | — |
| Episode 12 (October 19) | Tomson & Baron | 7 | Patryk Żywczyk | "Livin' on the Edge" | Karol Olszewski | — | —N/a | — | — |
| Episode 12 (October 19) | Kamil Bednarek | 8 | Paulina & Bartek Gruszeccy | "Ain't No Mountain High Enough" | Daria Kowolik | — | — | — | —N/a |
| Episode 13 (October 26) | Tomson & Baron | 1 | Klaudia Kowalik | "What About Us" | Magdalena Panek | — | —N/a | — | — |
| Episode 13 (October 26) | Michał Szpak | 2 | Piotr Szewczyk | "W żółtych płomieniach liści"^{3} | Dagmara Latosińska | —N/a | — | — | — |
| Episode 13 (October 26) | Kamil Bednarek | 3 | Kalina De Roover | "Think" | Edyta Pilarska | — | — | — | —N/a |
| Episode 13 (October 26) | Margaret | 4 | Stanisław Ślęzak | "I Don't Care" | Jakob Proch | — | — | —N/a | — |
| Episode 13 (October 26) | Michał Szpak | 5 | Marzena Ryt | "Jolene" | Julia Mróz | —N/a | — | — | — |
| Episode 13 (October 26) | Kamil Bednarek | 6 | Kasjan Cieśla | "Miłość Miłość"^{4} | Mikołaj Macioszczyk | ✔ | ✔ | ✔ | —N/a |
| Episode 13 (October 26) | Margaret | 7 | Tadeusz Seibert | "Never Tear Us Apart" | Martyna Kowalik | — | ✔ | —N/a | ✔ |
| Episode 13 (October 26) | Tomson & Baron | 8 | Alicja Szemplińska | "1+1" | Daria Reczek | ✔ | —N/a | ✔ | ✔ |

^1 by Hey ^2 by Mrozu ^3 by Skaldowie & Łucja Prus ^4 by Zalewski

== The Knockout Round ==
=== Episode 14 (November 2, 2019) ===
Knockouts took place on 2 November 2019.

Color keys

| Contestant was not switched out and advanced to the Live Shows |
| Contestant was eliminated, either immediately (indicated by a "—" in the "Switched with" column) or switched with another contestant |

| Coach | Order | Artist | Song | Result | Switched with |
|---|---|---|---|---|---|
| Michał Szpak | 1 | Filip Czyżykowski | "Chwile jak te" | Eliminated | N/A |
| Michał Szpak | 2 | Magdalena Ollar | "Run to You" | Advanced | N/A |
| Michał Szpak | 3 | Marzena Ryt | "Million Reasons" | Eliminated | N/A |
| Michał Szpak | 4 | Violet Oliferuk | "New Rules" | Eliminated | N/A |
| Michał Szpak | 5 | Piotr Szewczyk | "Co mi Panie dasz"^{1} | Advanced | Violet Oliferuk |
| Michał Szpak | 6 | Daria Reczek | "Young and Beautiful" | Advanced | Filip Czyżykowski |
| Michał Szpak | 7 | Jakub Dąbrowski | "All I Want" | Advanced | Marzena Ryt |
| Margaret | 1 | Zofia Marcinkowska | "People Help the People" | Eliminated | N/A |
| Margaret | 2 | Stanisław Ślęzak | "Sign of the Times" | Advanced | N/A |
| Margaret | 3 | Sonia Michalczuk | "Kiedy powiem sobie dość"^{2} | Advanced | N/A |
| Margaret | 4 | Karolina Wójtowicz | "Empire State of Mind (Part II) Broken Down" | Eliminated | N/A |
| Margaret | 5 | Iwona Kmiecik | "Czas nas uczy pogody"^{3} | Eliminated | — |
| Margaret | 6 | Sonia Hornatkiewicz | "Turning Tables" | Advanced | Karolina Wójtowicz |
| Margaret | 7 | Tadeusz Seibert | "When a Man Loves a Woman" | Advanced | Zofia Marcinkowska |
| Kamil Bednarek | 1 | Julia Olędzka | "Back to Black" | Advanced | N/A |
| Kamil Bednarek | 2 | Damian Kulej | "Jak na lotni"^{4} | Advanced | N/A |
| Kamil Bednarek | 3 | Martyna Kowalik | "Byle jak" | Eliminated | N/A |
| Kamil Bednarek | 4 | Ada Nasiadka | "Rather Be" | Advanced | N/A |
| Kamil Bednarek | 5 | Paulina & Bartek Gruszeccy | "Need You Now" | Eliminated | — |
| Kamil Bednarek | 6 | Kalina De Roover | "Chandelier" | Eliminated | — |
| Kamil Bednarek | 7 | Kasjan Cieśla | "Angels" | Advanced | Martyna Kowalik |
| Tomson & Baron | 1 | Patryk Żywczyk | "Photograph" | Advanced | N/A |
| Tomson & Baron | 2 | Adrian Burek | "Creep" | Advanced | N/A |
| Tomson & Baron | 3 | Agnieszka Smoleń | "Drzwi"^{5} | Eliminated | N/A |
| Tomson & Baron | 4 | Mikołaj Macioszczyk | "Miód" | Eliminated | N/A |
| Tomson & Baron | 5 | Bartosz Deryło | "For Once in My Life" | Advanced | Mikołaj Macioszczyk |
| Tomson & Baron | 6 | Alicja Szemplińska | "Get Here" | Advanced | Agnieszka Smoleń |
| Tomson & Baron | 7 | Klaudia Kowalik | "One and Only" | Eliminated | — |

^1 by Bajm ^2 ^5 by O.N.A. ^3 by Grażyna Łobaszewska ^4 by Andrzej Zaucha

== Live Shows ==
Color keys

| Artist was saved by Public's vote |
| Artist was saved by his/her coach |
| Artist was eliminated |

=== Episode 15 (November 9, 2019) ===
| Order | Coach | Artist | Song | Result |
|---|---|---|---|---|
| 1 | Tomson & Baron | Patryk Żywczyk | "Love Runs Out" | Coach's choice |
| 2 | Tomson & Baron | Adrian Burek | "Nieśmiertelni"^{1} | Eliminated |
| 3 | Tomson & Baron | Bartosz Deryło | "Impossible" | Public's Vote |
| 4 | Tomson & Baron | Alicja Szemplińska | "I Don't Want to Miss a Thing" | Public's Vote |
| 1 | Kamil Bednarek | Damian Kulej | "Back In My World" | Public's Vote |
| 2 | Kamil Bednarek | Julia Olędzka | "Krótka historia"^{2} | Public's Vote |
| 3 | Kamil Bednarek | Ada Nasiadka | "Can't Take My Eyes Off You" | Eliminated |
| 4 | Kamil Bednarek | Kasjan Cieśla | "You & I" | Coach's choice |
| 1 | Michał Szpak | Magdalena Ollar | "Koła czasu"^{3} | Eliminated |
| 2 | Michał Szpak | Piotr Szewczyk | "Nigdy więcej"^{4} | Coach's choice |
| 3 | Michał Szpak | Daria Reczek | "Tell Him" | Public's Vote |
| 4 | Michał Szpak | Jakub Dąbrowski | "The Blower's Daughter" | Public's Vote |
| 1 | Margaret | Sonia Michalczuk | "I'm So Excited" | Coach's choice |
| 2 | Margaret | Sonia Hornatkiewicz | "Sen"^{5} | Eliminated |
| 3 | Margaret | Stanisław Ślęzak | "Too Good at Goodbyes" | Public's Vote |
| 4 | Margaret | Tadeusz Seibert | "Human" | Public's Vote |

^1 by Mrozu ^2 by Bajm ^3 by O.N.A. ^4 by Püdelsi (orig. Piotr Szczepanik) ^5 by Edyta Bartosiewicz

=== Episode 16 - Quarter-Final (November 16, 2019) ===
| Order | Coach | Artist | Song | Result |
|---|---|---|---|---|
| 1 | Margaret | Stanisław Ślęzak | "Miliony monet"^{1} | Coach's choice |
| 2 | Margaret | Sonia Michalczuk | "Testosteron" | Eliminated |
| 3 | Margaret | Tadeusz Seibert | "Lubię wracać tam gdzie byłem"^{2} | Public's Vote |
| 1 | Kamil Bednarek | Julia Olędzka | "Stand Up for Love" | Eliminated |
| 2 | Kamil Bednarek | Kasjan Cieśla | "Nie mam dla ciebie miłości"^{3} | Public's Vote |
| 3 | Kamil Bednarek | Damian Kulej | "Ktoś między nami"^{4} | Coach's choice |
| 1 | Tomson & Baron | Bartosz Deryło | "Nad przepaścią"^{5} | Coach's choice |
| 2 | Tomson & Baron | Alicja Szemplińska | "Unconditionally" | Public's Vote |
| 3 | Tomson & Baron | Patryk Żywczyk | "Na szczycie"^{6} | Eliminated |
| 1 | Michał Szpak | Piotr Szewczyk | "Stay" | Eliminated |
| 2 | Michał Szpak | Jakub Dąbrowski | "Wracam do domu" | Public's Vote |
| 3 | Michał Szpak | Daria Reczek | "Gravity" | Coach's choice |

^1 by Mrozu ^2 by Zbigniew Wodecki ^3 by Skubas ^4 by Anna Jantar & Zbigniew Hołdys ^5 by Bracia ^6 by Grubson

=== Episode 17 - Semifinal (November 23, 2019) ===
| Coach | Order | Artist | Cover song | Original song | Points | | | Result |
| Coach | Order | Artist | Cover song | Original song | Coach | Public | Total | Result |
|---|---|---|---|---|---|---|---|---|
| Kamil Bednarek | 1 | Kasjan Cieśla | "Someone You Loved" | "Zaczynam oddychać" | 40% | 50% | 90% | Eliminated |
| Kamil Bednarek | 2 | Damian Kulej | "Everything" | "Ostatni raz" | 60% | 50% | 110% | Advanced |
| Michał Szpak | 1 | Jakub Dąbrowski | "Chasing Cars" | "Skąd to znam?" | 55% | 41% | 96% | Eliminated |
| Michał Szpak | 2 | Daria Reczek | "River" | "Nie polubisz mnie" | 45% | 59% | 104% | Advanced |
| Tomson & Baron | 1 | Bartosz Deryło | "Another Day" | "Domek z kart" | 49% | 39% | 88% | Eliminated |
| Tomson & Baron | 2 | Alicja Szemplińska | "Wicked Game"^{1} | "Prawie my" | 51% | 61% | 112% | Advanced |
| Margaret | 1 | Stanisław Ślęzak | "In My Blood" | "Szept" | 40% | 52% | 92% | Eliminated |
| Margaret | 2 | Tadeusz Seibert | "Crazy" | "Na nic nie czekam" | 60% | 48% | 108% | Advanced |

^1 Ursine Vulpine (feat. Annaca) version

=== Episode 18 - Final (November 30, 2019) ===
| Order | Coach | Artist | Song | | Result |
|---|---|---|---|---|---|
| 1 | Kamil Bednarek | Damian Kulej | Duet with coach | "Sledgehammer" | Fourth Place |
| 1 | Kamil Bednarek | Damian Kulej | English song | "Make You Feel My Love" | Fourth Place |
| 1 | Kamil Bednarek | Damian Kulej | Polish song | —N/a | Fourth Place |
| 1 | Kamil Bednarek | Damian Kulej | Original song | —N/a | Fourth Place |
| 2 | Margaret | Tadeusz Seibert | Duet with coach | "Say Something" | Third Place |
| 2 | Margaret | Tadeusz Seibert | English song | "Cryin'" | Third Place |
| 2 | Margaret | Tadeusz Seibert | Polish song | "Jednego serca"^{1} | Third Place |
| 2 | Margaret | Tadeusz Seibert | Original song | —N/a | Third Place |
| 3 | Michał Szpak | Daria Reczek | Duet with coach | "Jej portret"^{2} | Runner-up |
| 3 | Michał Szpak | Daria Reczek | English song | "You Are the Reason" | Runner-up |
| 3 | Michał Szpak | Daria Reczek | Polish song | "Dwa serca, dwa smutki"^{3} | Runner-up |
| 3 | Michał Szpak | Daria Reczek | Original song | "Nie polubisz mnie" | Runner-up |
| 4 | Tomson & Baron | Alicja Szemplińska | Duet with coach | "As" | Winner |
| 4 | Tomson & Baron | Alicja Szemplińska | English song | "The Show Must Go On" | Winner |
| 4 | Tomson & Baron | Alicja Szemplińska | Polish song | "Litania" | Winner |
| 4 | Tomson & Baron | Alicja Szemplińska | Original song | "Prawie my" | Winner |

^1 by Czesław Niemen ^2 by Bogusław Mec ^3 by Bajm

== Results summary of live shows ==
=== Overall ===
Color keys
Artist's info

- Artist from Team Tomson & Baron
- Artist from Team Michał Szpak
- Artist from Team Margaret
- Artist from Team Kamil Bednarek

Result details

- Artist was proclaimed as winner
- Artist was proclaimed as runner-up
- Artist was proclaimed as third place
- Artist was proclaimed as fourth place
- Artist advanced to the finals
- Artist was saved by his/her coach
- Artist was saved by the public
- Artist received the fewest accumulated total points and was eliminated
- Artist received the fewest of the public's vote and was eliminated

Live show results per week
| Artist | Week 1 | Week 2 | Week 3 | Finals |
|---|---|---|---|---|
| Alicja Szemplińska | Safe | Safe | Advanced | Winner |
| Daria Reczek | Safe | Safe | Advanced | Runner-Up |
| Tadeusz Seibert | Safe | Safe | Advanced | 3rd Place |
| Damian Kulej | Safe | Safe | Advanced | 4th Place |
| Kasjan Cieśla | Safe | Safe | Eliminated | Eliminated (Week 3) |
| Jakub Dąbrowski | Safe | Safe | Eliminated | Eliminated (Week 3) |
| Bartosz Deryło | Safe | Safe | Eliminated | Eliminated (Week 3) |
| Stanisław Ślęzak | Safe | Safe | Eliminated | Eliminated (Week 3) |
| Patryk Żywczyk | Safe | Eliminated | Eliminated (Week 2) | |
| Sonia Michalczuk | Safe | Eliminated | Eliminated (Week 2) | |
| Piotr Szewczyk | Safe | Eliminated | Eliminated (Week 2) | |
| Julia Olędzka | Safe | Eliminated | Eliminated (Week 2) | |
| Magdalena Ollar | Eliminated | Eliminated (Week 1) | | |
| Sonia Hornatkiewicz | Eliminated | Eliminated (Week 1) | | |
| Ada Nasiadka | Eliminated | Eliminated (Week 1) | | |
| Adrian Burek | Eliminated | Eliminated (Week 1) | | |

=== Team ===
Artist's info

- Artist from Team Kamil Bednarek
- Artist from Team Margaret
- Artist from Team Michał Szpak
- Artist from Team Tomson & Baron

Result details

- Winner
- Runner-up
- Third place
- Fourth Place
- Artist advanced to the finals
- Artist was saved by his/her coach
- Artist was saved by public
- Artist was eliminated

Live show results per week
| Artist | Live Shows | | | |
| Artist | Week 1 | Week 2 | Week 3 | Finals |
|---|---|---|---|---|
| Damian Kulej | Public's vote | Coach's choice | Advanced Finals | Fourth Place |
| Kasjan Cieśla | Coach's choice | Public's vote | Eliminated | |
| Julia Olędzka | Public's vote | Eliminated | | |
| Ada Nasiadka | Eliminated | | | |
| Tadeusz Seibert | Public's vote | Public's vote | Advanced Finals | Third Place |
| Stanisław Ślęzak | Public's vote | Coach's choice | Eliminated | |
| Sonia Michalczuk | Coach's choice | Eliminated | | |
| Sonia Hornatkiewicz | Eliminated | | | |
| Daria Reczek | Public's vote | Coach's choice | Advanced Finals | Runner-up |
| Jakub Dąbrowski | Public's vote | Public's vote | Eliminated | |
| Piotr Szewczyk | Coach's choice | Eliminated | | |
| Magdalena Ollar | Eliminated | | | |
| Alicja Szemplińska | Public's vote | Public's vote | Advanced Finals | Winner |
| Bartosz Deryło | Public's vote | Coach's choice | Eliminated | |
| Patryk Żywczyk | Coach's choice | Eliminated | | |
| Adrian Burek | Eliminated | | | |

== Non-competition performances ==
| Episode | Performer | Song |
|---|---|---|
| 1 | Rafał Brzozowski | "Tak blisko" |
| 4 | Baranovski | "Czułe miejsce" |
| 6 | Antek Smykiewicz | "Neony" |
| 7 | Marta Gałuszewska & Jeremi | "Szukam nas" |
| 10 | Michał Szczygieł | "Nie mamy nic" |
| 11 | Mateusz Ziółko | "W płomieniach" |
| 12 | Kamil Bijoś / Filip Lato / Sound'n'Grace | "100" / "Idealnie" |
| 13 | Krzysztof Iwaneczko | "Pozwól" |
| 14 | Damian Ukeje | "Tu i teraz" |
| 15 | Anna Karwan | "Słucham Cię w Radiu Co Tydzień" |
| 15 | Frans | "If I Were Sorry" |
| 16 | Natalia Nykiel | "Error" |
| 16 | Indila | "Dernière danse" |
| 16 | Natalia Nykiel | "Volcano" |
| 16 | Indila | "Parle à ta tête" |
| 17 | Sarsa | "Nienaiwne" |
| 17 | Duncan Laurence | "Arcade" |
| 17 | Duncan Laurence | "Love Don't Hate It" |
| 18 | Mahmood | "Soldi" |
| 18 | Marcin Sójka | "Lepiej" |
| 18 | Alicja Majewska / Urszula Dudziak / Andrzej Piaseczny / Marek Piekarczyk | "Odkryjemy miłość nieznaną" / "Papaya" / "Śniadanie do łóżka" / "Nie widzę Ciebie w swych marzeniach" |
| 18 | Mahmood | "Barrio" |
| 18 | Viki Gabor | "Superhero" |
