= Color of Your Life =

2016 song by Michał Szpak

Single by Michał Szpak

from the album Byle być sobą
- Released: 11 March 2016
- Recorded: 2015
- Genre: Pop; operatic pop
- Length: 3:20 (album version); 2:59 (eurovision edit)
- Label: Sony Music Entertainment Poland
- Songwriters: Andy Palmer; Kamil Varen
- Producer: Beat Music

Michał Szpak singles chronology
"Such Is Life" (2015)	"Color of Your Life" (2016)	"Rosanna" (2016)

Eurovision Song Contest 2016 entry
- Country: Poland
- Artist: Michał Szpak
- Language: English
- Composer: Andy Palmer
- Lyricist: Kamil Varen

Finals performance
- Semi-final result: 6th
- Semi-final points: 151
- Final result: 8th
- Final points: 229

Entry chronology
- ◄ "In the Name of Love" (2015)
- "Flashlight" (2017) ►

"Color of Your Life" is a song performed by Polish singer Michał Szpak. The song was released as a digital download on 11 March 2016 through Sony Music Entertainment Poland as the fourth single from his debut studio album Byle być sobą (2015). The song was chosen by public broadcaster TVP to represent Poland in the Eurovision Song Contest 2016, and reached the 8th position in the final.

The single peaked at number 34 on the Polish Airplay Chart.

== Eurovision Song Contest ==
=== Krajowe Eliminacje 2016 ===
Krajowe Eliminacje 2016 was the national final organised by TVP in order to select the Polish entry for the Eurovision Song Contest 2016. The show took place on 5 March 2016 at the TVP Headquarters in Warsaw, hosted by Artur Orzech. Public televoting exclusively selected the winner. The show was broadcast on TVP1 and TVP Polonia as well as streamed online at the broadcaster's website eurowizja.tvp.pl.

The televised final took place on 5 March 2016. Nine entries competed and the winner, "Color of Your Life" performed by Michał Szpak, was determined entirely by a public vote. He represented Poland in the Eurovision Song Contest 2016 in Stockholm, Sweden, performing in the second semi-final on 12 May 2016. He qualified for the final and finished the contest at 8th position with 229 points.

== Music video ==
The official music video for the song was uploaded to YouTube on 21 December 2015.

== Track listing ==
Digital download
No.	Title	Length
1.	"Color of Your Life"	3:20

== Charts ==
Chart (2016)	Peak position
Austria (Ö3 Austria Top 40)	66
France (SNEP)	156
Poland Airplay (ZPAV)	34
Poland (Polish Airplay New)	2
Sweden Heatseekers (Sverigetopplistan)	1

== Certifications ==
Region	Certification	Certified units/sales
Poland (ZPAV)	Diamond	100,000^{‡}
^{‡} Sales+streaming figures based on certification alone.
