= Ignacy Błażejowski =

Polish singer and songwriter (born 2003)

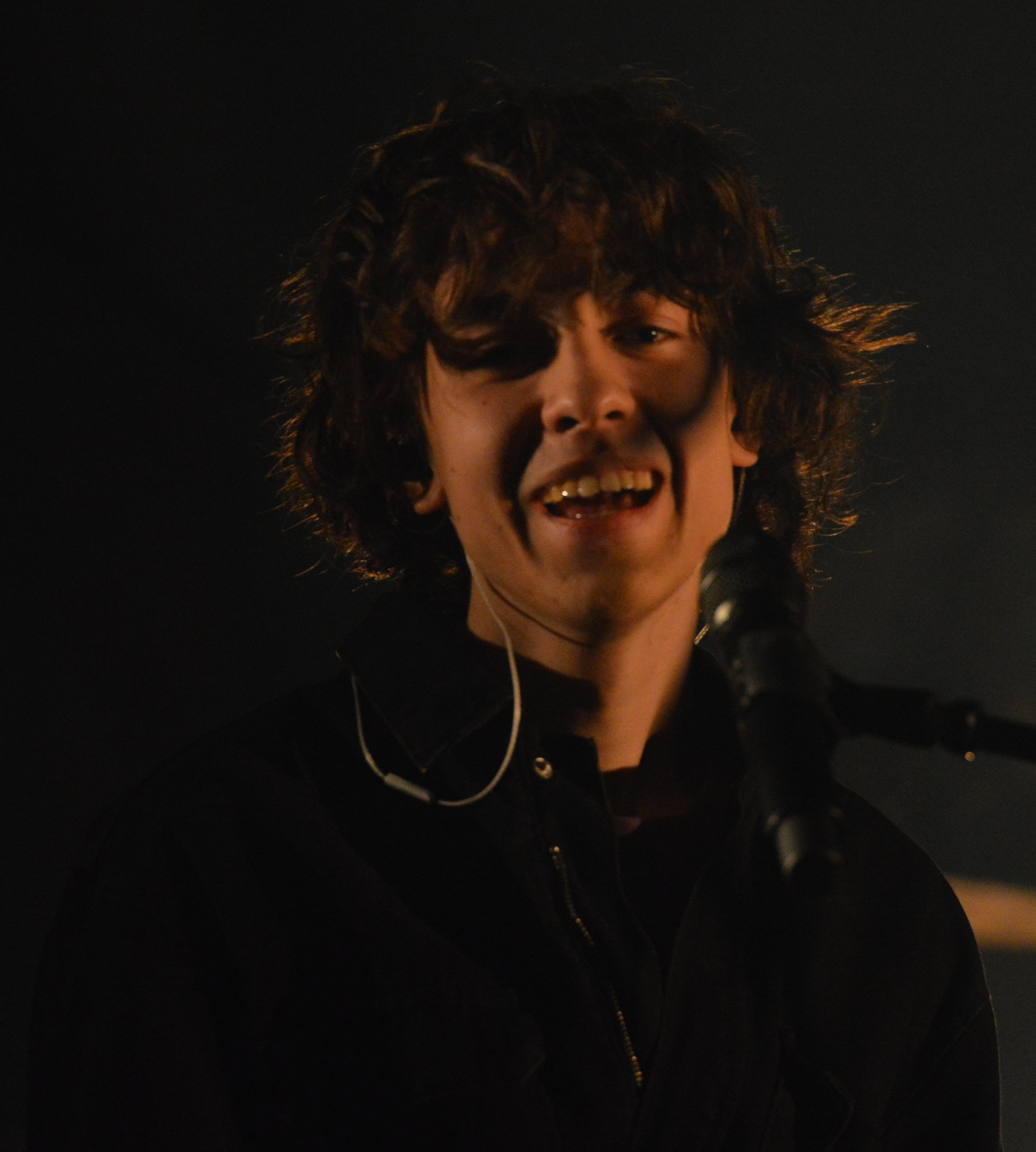
- Ignacy Błażejowski, 2023
- Born: 5 October 2003 (age 23); Krosno
- Citizenship: Polish
- Occupation: Musician

Ignacy Błażejowski (born 5 October 2003) is a singer, songwriter and composer.

== Biography ==
He started singing at the age of seven. At the age of nine, he joined the Swing Song Studio at the Regionalne Centrum Kultur Pogranicza in Krosno, where he trained under the supervision of Lucyna Durał. In 2016 he participated in the TV show Mali giganci. In 2020 he participated in the season 11 of The Voice of Poland. In 2017, he was a scholarship holder of the Motivational Scholarship Program of the City of Krosno, awarded by the Mayor of the city, Piotr Przytocki, for artistic achievements.

He graduated from the Secondary Music School in the piano class. He started studying jazz vocal performance at the Academy of Music in Katowice.

== Discography ==
- Ignacy (2023)
- Central Park (album) (2023)
- Limbo (Ignacy Błażejowski album) (2024)

== Singles ==
- Czekam na znak (2022)
- To co mam (2023)
- Samoloty (2023)
- Niepewność (2023)

== Awards and nominations ==
He earned two Fryderyki 2024 nominations for phonographic debut of the year and pop album of the year (for Central Park).
