= Byle być sobą =

Studio album by Michał Szpak
- Released: 13 November 2015
- Recorded: 2015
- Genre: Rock; Pop
- Length: 40:20
- Label: Sony Music Entertainment Poland
- Producer: Jamie Axel; Mateusz Kreza; Andy Palmer

Michał Szpak chronology
XI (2011)	Byle być sobą (2015)	Dreamer (2018)

Singles from Byle być sobą
- 1. "Jesteś bohaterem/Real Hero" Released: 15 April 2015; 2. "Byle być sobą" Released: 23 October 2015; 3. "Such Is Life" Released: 21 December 2015; 4. "Color of Your Life" Released: 11 March 2016; 5. "Rosanna" Released: 21 September 2016; 6. "Tic Tac Clock" Released: 16 January 2017

Byle być sobą (English: Anything to be Myself) is the debut studio album by Polish singer Michał Szpak. It was released on 13 November 2015 in Poland through Sony Music Entertainment Poland.

Byle być sobą reached number one on the Polish Albums Chart, and was certified double platinum in Poland by the Polish Society of the Phonographic Industry (ZPAV).

== Singles ==
"Real Hero" was released as the lead single from the album on 15 April 2015. "Byle być sobą" was released as the second single from the album on 23 October 2015. "Such Is Life" was released as the third single from the album on 21 December 2015.

"Color of Your Life" was released as the fourth single from the album on 11 March 2016. The song represented Poland at the Eurovision Song Contest 2016, the song was selected through Krajowe Eliminacje 2016. The televised final took place on 5 March 2016. Nine entries competed including "Color of Your Life", the winner was determined entirely by a public vote. The song won with 35.89% of the vote. At Eurovision Michał Szpak took part in technical rehearsals on 4 and 7 May 2016, followed by dress rehearsal on 11 May 2016. He performed during the second semi-final on 12 May 2016, he made it to the grand final. Once again took part in dress rehearsals on 13 May 2016 with the final taking place on 14 May 2016. During the voting in the final he was in second last place after the jury vote with 7 points but finished 3rd in the televoting with 222 points and finished 8th overall in the final with 229 points.

== Track listing ==
Standard edition
No.	Title	Writer(s)	Producer(s)	Length
1.	"Real Hero"	Olivia Morney	Jamie Axel	3:40
2.	"Byle być sobą" (Anything to be Myself)	Aldona Dąbrowska	Mateusz Kreza	2:59
3.	"Rosanna"	Olivia Morney	Jamie Axel	3:36
4.	"Bo życie takie jest" (Because Life is Like that)	Aldona Dąbrowska	Jamie Axel	3:29
5.	"Tic Tac Clock"	Olivia Morney	Jamie Axel	3:33
6.	"What a Shame"	Olivia Morney	Jamie Axel	4:01
7.	"Upaść, ale wstać" (Fall, But Rise)	Aldona Dąbrowska	Jamie Axel	3:31
8.	"Znika cały mrok" (The Darkness Disappears)	Aldona Dąbrowska	Jamie Axel	3:05
9.	"Color of Your Life"	Kamil Varen	Andy Palmer	3:20
10.	"Ostatni zakręt" (Last Turn)	Aldona Dąbrowska	Jamie Axel	2:05
11.	"Jesteś bohaterem" (You are a Hero)	Aldona Dąbrowska	Jamie Axel	3:31
12.	"Such Is Life"	Olivia Morney	Jamie Axel	3:30
Total length:				40:20

== Charts and certifications ==
=== Weekly charts ===
Chart (2016)	Peak position
Polish Albums (ZPAV)	1

=== Certifications ===
Region	Certification	Certified units/sales
Poland (ZPAV)	2× Platinum	60,000^{‡}
^{‡} Sales+streaming figures based on certification alone.

== Release history ==
Country	Date	Label	Format	Ref.
Poland	13 November 2015	Sony Music Entertainment Poland	Digital download, CD	
