= Afromental =

Polish music group (founded 2004)

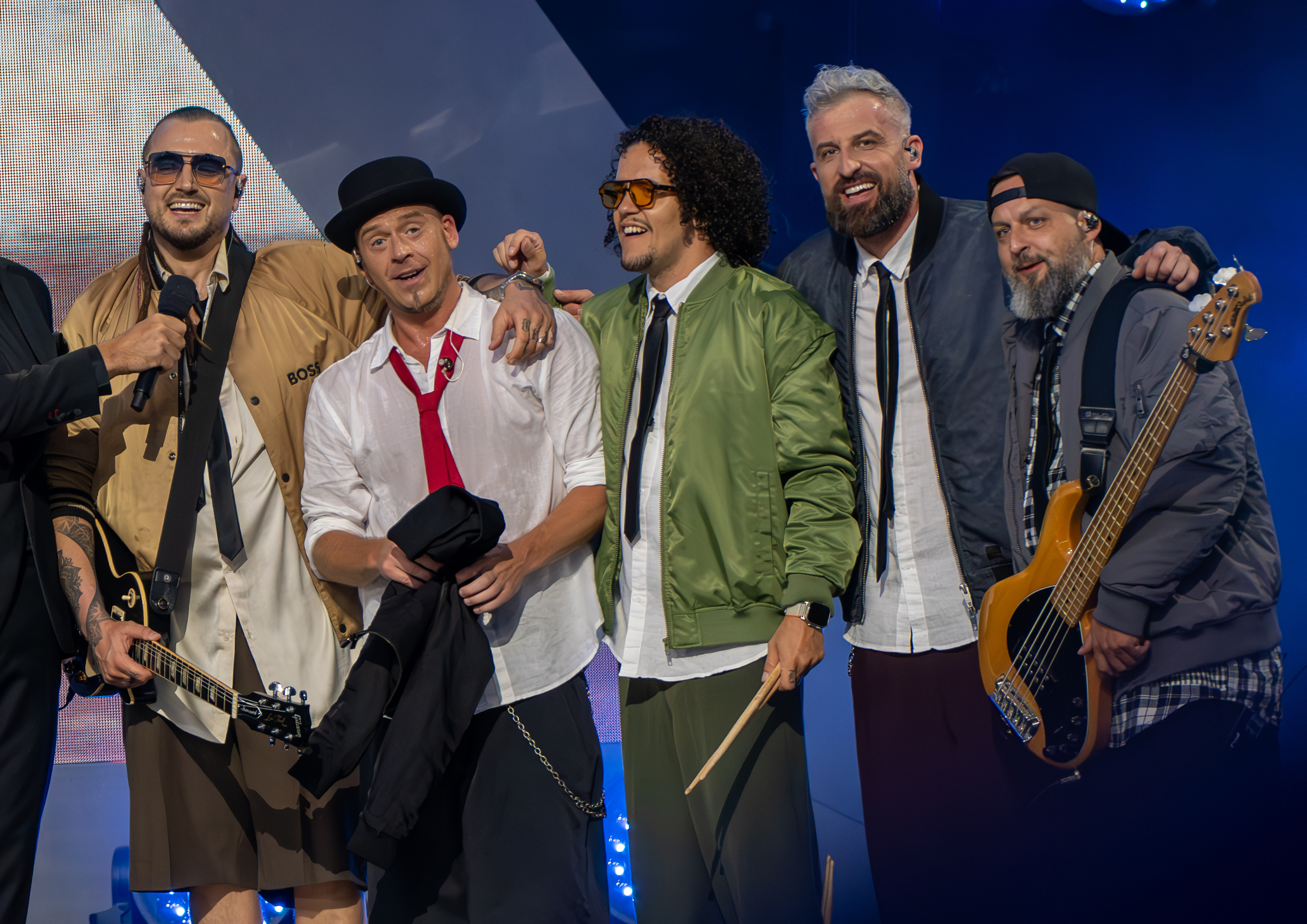
- Afromental in 2024

Background information
- Origin: Olsztyn, Poland
- Genres: Funk; R&B; soul; hip hop; rapcore; pop; nu metal
- Years active: 2004-present
- Labels: EMI Music Poland, Warner Music Poland
- Members: Tomasz Lach; Bartosz Śniadecki; Tomasz Torres; Wojtek Witczak; Aleksander Milwiw-Baron
- Past members: Wojciech Łozowski; Grzegorz Dziamka
- Website: afromental.com (defunct)

Afromental is a Polish rock and rapcore band formed in Olsztyn in 2004.

The group has released four singles: "I've Got What You Need" (2007), "Thing We've Got" (2008), "Happy Day" (2008), and "Pray 4 Love" (2009). They have released two full-length albums on EMI Poland, and their 2009 release Playing with Pop reached #19 on the Polish Music Charts.

== History ==
The band debuted on the Review of Young Bands in the 'Olsztyńska' Newspaper. They appeared in the "Golden Ten" of the Youth Music Festival Gama in Kolobrzeg, for their interpretation of the song "Banana Song" by Vox in a reggae style, for which they gained an award during the Student Song Festival in Kraków.

Afromental released their debut album on 12 October 2007 titled The Breakthru. The single which promoted the album, "I've Got What You Need", qualified to the Top Trendy Festival 2007 in Sopot. In 2008, the band took part in qualifying for the Eurovision Song Contest, during which the group performed the song "Thing We've Got".

In 2009, Afomental appeared in the second season of the television series 39 and a half, in which they performed their newest recordings. The band also recorded songs for the film Love and Dance. Their second album Playing With Pop has been released on 9 March 2009 linked to their previous album. On 13 June 2009 the band has been awarded a Superjedynka in the category Band of the Year.

In February 2010 the publisher of Playing With Pop received a nomination for the Polish industry of Phonografic Frederick award in the following category: album of the year hip-hop / R & B. In August 2010 the band won the Wow! Music Award during Orange Warsaw Festival.

On 15 August 2011 Afromental released their third album titled The B.O.M.B.. It promoted the singles Rock&Rollin' Love, Rollin' With You and It's My Life.

== Members ==
- Tomasz "Tomson" Lach - vocals
- Bartosz "Śniady" Śniadecki - keyboards
- Tomasz "Torres" Torres - drums
- Wojtek "Lajan" Witczak - bass guitar
- Aleksander "Baron" Milwiw-Baron - guitar

Past members:

- Wojciech "Łozo" Łozowski - vocals
- Grzegorz "Dziamas" Dziamka - drums

== Discography ==
=== Studio albums ===
Title	Album details	Peak chart positions	Sales	Certifications
Title	Album details	POL	Sales	Certifications
The Breakthru	Released: 15 October 2007; Label: EMI Music Poland; Formats: CD, digital download	—		
Playing with Pop	Released: 9 March 2009; Label: EMI Music Poland; Formats: CD, digital download	19	POL: 15,000+	POL: Gold
The B.O.M.B.	Released: 14 November 2011; Label: EMI Music Poland; Formats: CD, digital download	17	POL: 15,000+	POL: Gold
Mental House	Released: 24 November 2014; Label: Warner Music Poland; Formats: CD, digital download	9		
"—" denotes a recording that did not chart or was not released in that territory.

=== Music videos ===
Title	Year	Directed	Album	Ref.
"Thing We've Got"	2007	—	The Breakthru	
"The Breakthru"	2007	—	The Breakthru	
"Pray for Love"	2009	—	Playing with Pop	
"Radio Song"	2010	—	Playing with Pop	
"Rock&Rollin' Love"	2010	Mitja Okorn	The B.O.M.B.	
"Rollin' With You"	2011	2dajRektors	The B.O.M.B.	
"It's my life" feat. VNM & Sound'n'Grace	2012	Letemknow Sequence	The B.O.M.B.	
"Mental House"	2014	Bartek Prokopowicz	Mental House	
"Differences"	2014	Bartek Prokopowicz	Mental House	
"Zaufaj"	2018	—		
