= Michał Szpak =

Polish singer (born 1990)

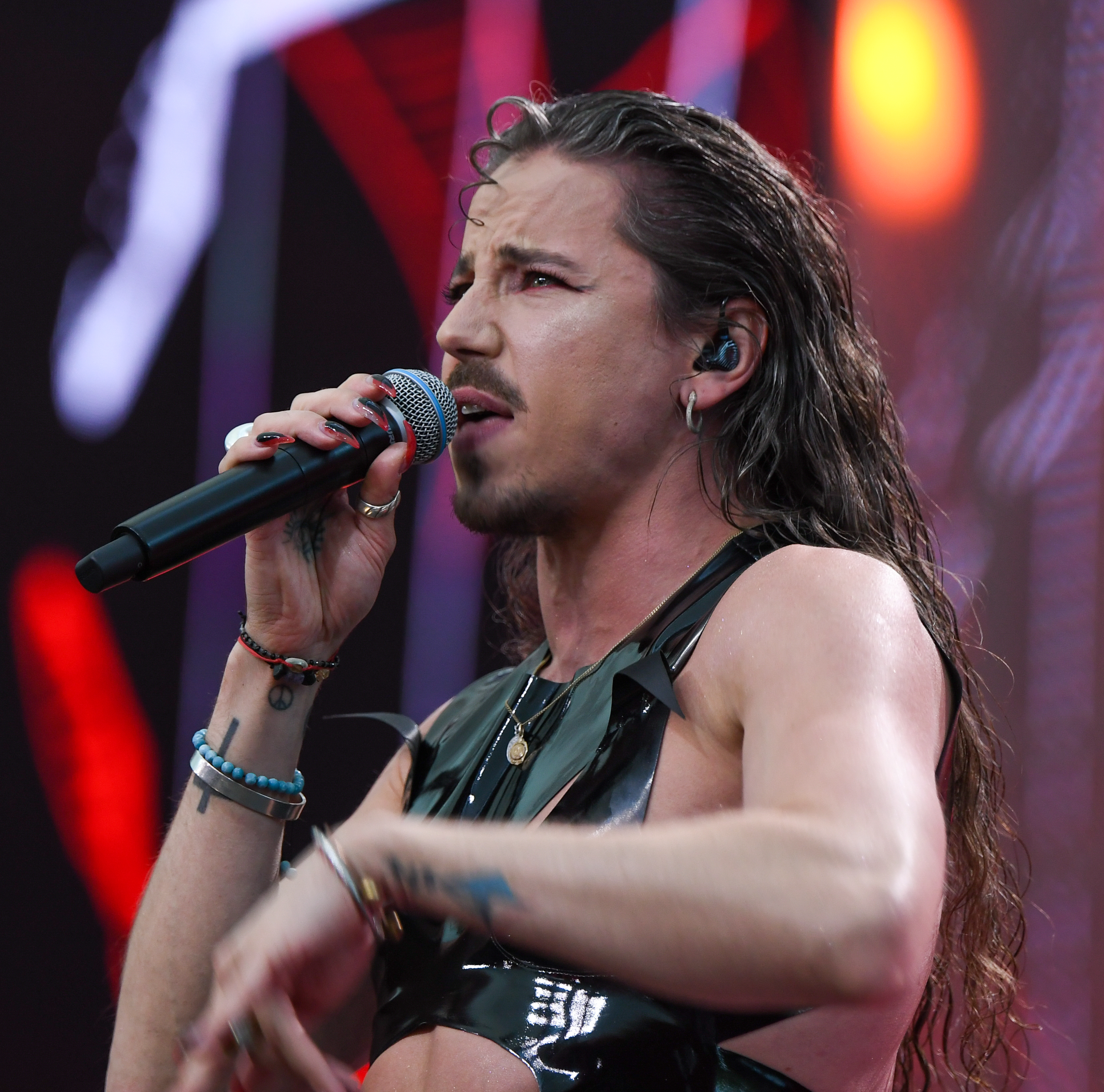
- Szpak in 2023

Background information
- Also known as: Miszel, Miszanel, Majkel
- Born: 26 November 1990 (age 35); Jasło, Poland
- Genres: Rock, pop, operatic pop, soul, jazz, electronic
- Occupations: Singer, songwriter
- Instrument: Vocals
- Years active: 2009–present
- Labels: Universal Music Polska, Sony Music Entertainment Poland, Warner Music Poland
- Formerly of: Whiplash
- Website: michalszpak.pl

Michał Szpak (born 26 November 1990) is a Polish singer who found fame on the inaugural season of the Polish X Factor in 2011. On 12 May 2016, Szpak represented Poland at the Eurovision Song Contest 2016 in Stockholm, Sweden with the song "Color of Your Life".

== Early and personal life ==
Michał was born in Jasło, a small town in southern Poland. His older sister Marlena is an opera singer born from his father Andrzej Szpak's first marriage. His father then remarried, and Michał was born along with siblings Damian and Ewa. His parents split when Michał was 10. Because of this and a job offer, his mother moved to Italy. The Szpak children kept living in Poland with their father and visited their mother during holidays. His brother Damian became an early source of support for Michał due to his eccentricity. His early music influences included Queen, Muse, Zbigniew Preisner, David Bowie and Michael Jackson. As a high school student, together with his friend Kamil Czapla, Szpak was part of the hard rock band Whiplash. Over the years, he has admitted that unlike his older sister, he has never taken any formal music lessons. Szpak currently resides in Warsaw, where he is pursuing a psychology degree at the University of Social Sciences and Humanities. Szpak identifies as pansexual.

== Career ==
=== 2011–2014: Career beginnings and X Factor ===
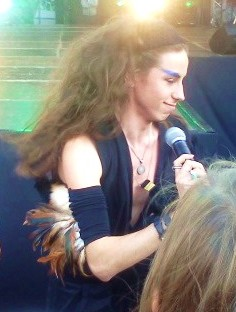
Szpak during X-Factor Poland concert tour in Port Łódź, June 24, 2011

On 6 March 2011, Szpak took part in Poland's first edition of The X Factor when he sang Czesław Niemen's classic "Dziwny jest ten świat" (Strange is the world). He eventually reached the final of the competition. On 5 June 2011, Szpak and 2008 British winner Alexandra Burke sang "Hallelujah" during the final. On 17 June 2011 he was part of the lineup for the Orange Warsaw Festival at Stadion Legii, which also included international artists such as Moby, Skunk Anansie, My Chemical Romance, Sistars, Plan B, The Streets and Jamiroquai.

Between 4 September and 6 November 2011, Szpak participated in the 13th edition of Taniec z gwiazdami, the Polish version of Dancing with the Stars, where he was partnered with the Polish professional dancer Paulina Biernat. Together they reached 5th place in the competition. Szpak's debut EP, XI, was released by Universal Music Poland in December 2011.

On 7 December 2011, Szpak performed as a guest celebrity on the finale of the Top Model. Zostań modelką (Polish for Top Model. Become a Model) show, an ongoing Polish reality documentary based on Tyra Banks' America's Next Top Model.

In 2013, he was awarded first prize at the Russian song Festival in Zielona Góra for his performance of the famous Russian song titled "Dark Eyes" (Russian "Очи чёрные", Ochi chyornye).

=== 2015: Byle być sobą ===
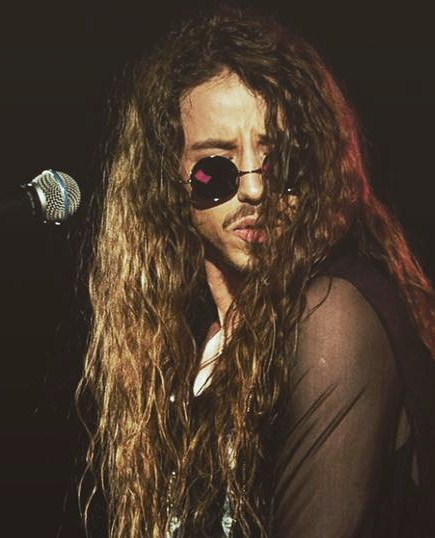
Szpak performing in Mińsk Mazowiecki, Poland (February 2016)

Byle być sobą (English: Only to be yourself) is the debut studio album by Szpak. It was released in Poland on 13 November 2015 through Sony Music Entertainment Poland. Titled as a reflection of his life and frame of mind at 24 years following the unexpected death of his mother, the album includes 12 songs performed in Polish as well as in English. The album, which was dedicated to the singer's mother has met with critical success in Poland. His flawless rendition of the song "Jesteś bohaterem" (English: "Real Hero") brought him first prize at the 2015 National Festival of Polish Song in Opole.

=== 2016: Eurovision Song Contest ===
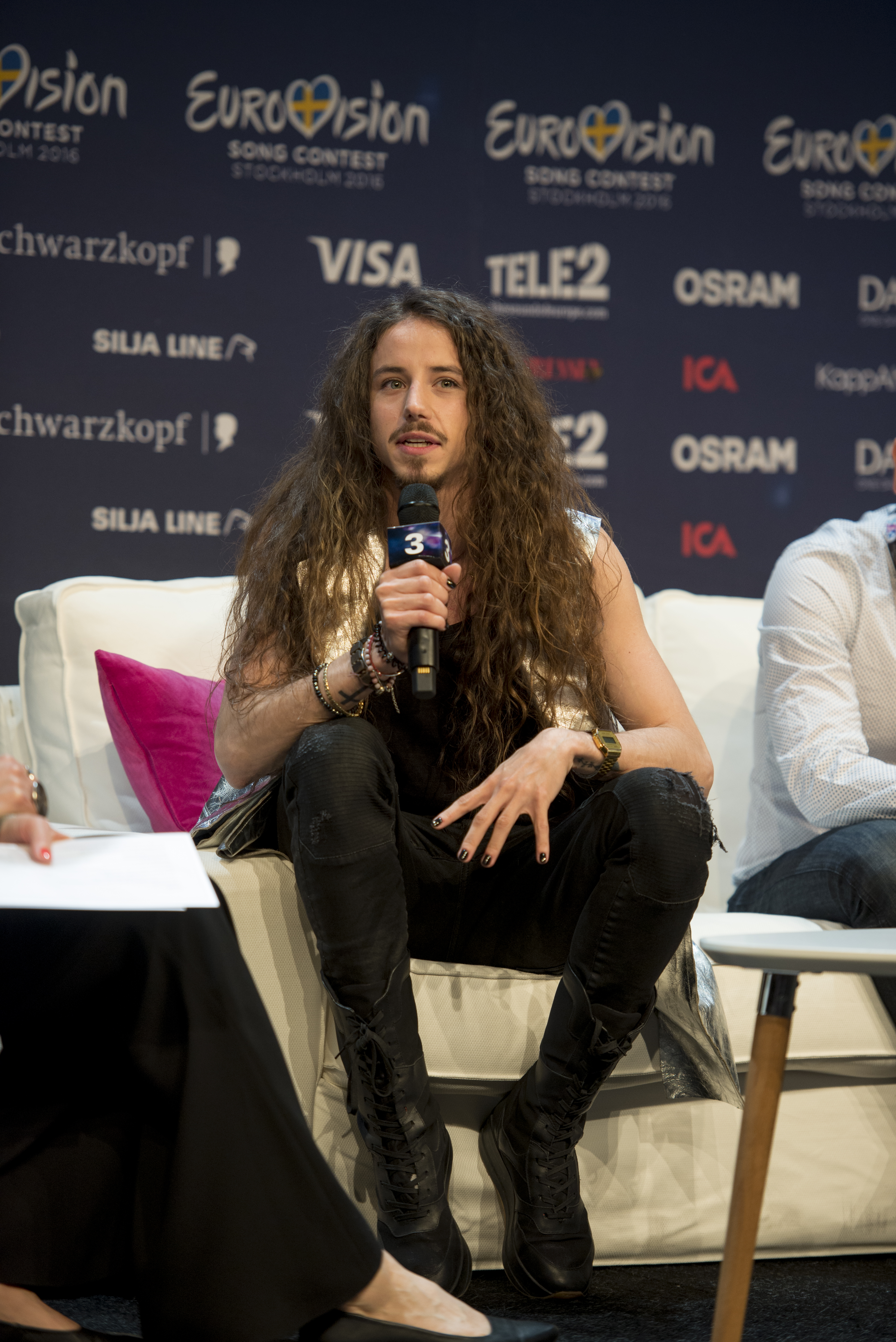
Szpak at a Meet & Greet during the Eurovision Song Contest 2016 in Stockholm

Michał Szpak represented Poland in the Eurovision Song Contest 2016 in Stockholm, Sweden with the song "Color of Your Life". He was selected by televote, beating world-famous Polish performer Margaret, who came second, and another accomplished singer, Edyta Górniak, who placed third; he collected 35.5% of the vote. This was the first time Poland had held a competition to choose its entry since its return in 2014. The Eurovision pre-selection show took place on 5 March 2016 at the TVP Headquarters in Warsaw and was hosted by Artur Orzech.

To promote his Eurovision Song Contest entry, Szpak took part in the Eurovision Concert Tour in London (17 April 2016), Tel Aviv (12 April 2016), Amsterdam (9 April 2016) and later Portugal.

On 12 May, Szpak performed in the first half of the second Eurovision semi-final. Following his live semi-final performance of "Color of Your Life", he made it through to the grand final. On 14 May, he performed 12th in the running order, between the Eurovision contestants from France and Australia.

All in all, Szpak won 3rd place from the public televoting and ended up benefiting from the new voting system. Despite being in second to last place with the juries, he leapt from seven points to 229 when public votes were added, and finished eighth overall.

=== 2017–2022: Judge at The Voice of Poland and Dreamer ===
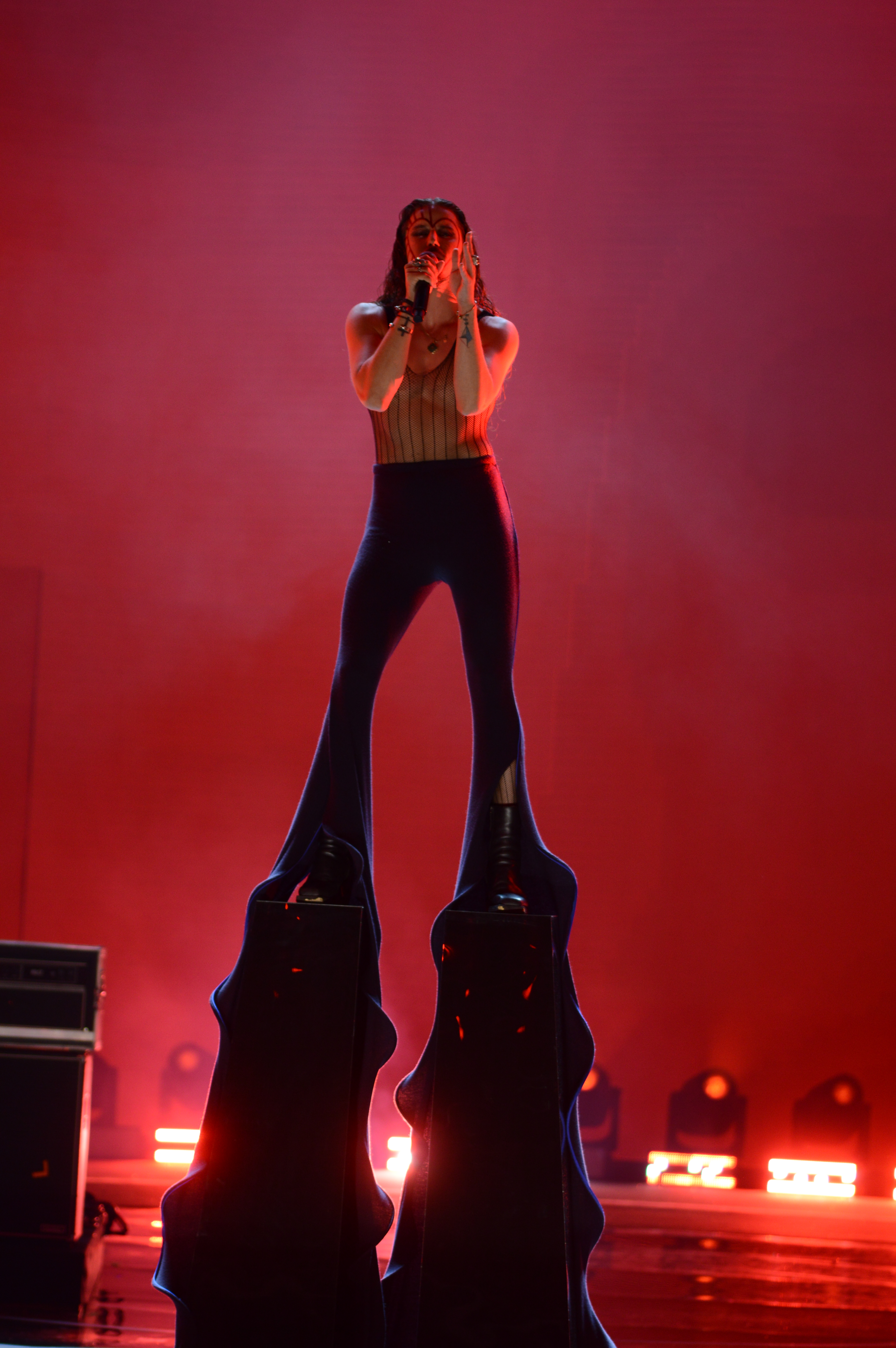
Szpak performing in Sopot Festival 2022

After finishing in 8th place in the Eurovision Song Contest 2016 in Stockholm, Michał Szpak has gone on to become a coach on The Voice of Poland replacing Natalia Kukulska. In 2017 he was the winning coach in his debut season with The Voice, promoting the winner, Marta Gałuszewska. Szpak continued as a coach each year until 2020, where he coached the winner Krystian Ochman.

In 2018 he released his second studio album titled Dreamer. The songs from the album have achieved huge success on YouTube, each receiving well over a million views. In November 2018 he released his latest single, titled "Dreamer (Thanks to You My Friend)". The song is about being strong, moving on and chasing your dreams with the help of your friends and loved ones. His previous singles from the album, "King of the Season" and "Rainbow", have received 3.1m and 2.4m views on YouTube respectively.

=== 2023–present: Nadwiślański mrok and continuation as The Voice of Poland judge ===
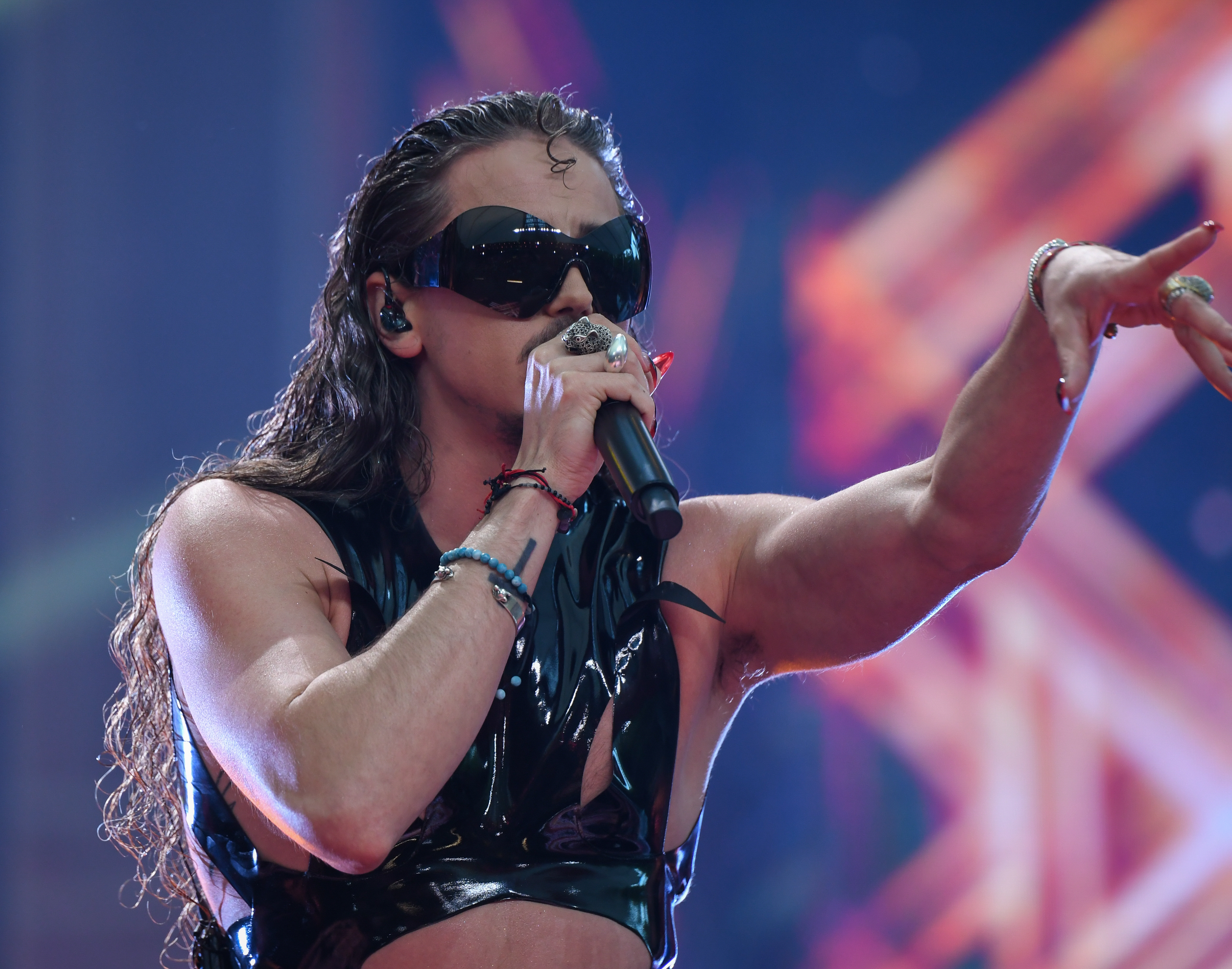
Szpak performing in Polsat Superhit Festival 2023 in Poland

Nadwiślański mrok is the third studio album by Michał Szpak. It was released on 24 November 2023, by the Warner Music Poland music label. The album is in the style of pop-rock music and consists of the standard version (1 CD). The recordings were promoted with the singles: "Hiob (Preludium)", "Bondage", "Warszawianka (mrok)", "Gaja" and "Smutek".

In 2024 and 2025, Szpak returned to The Voice of Poland for his fifth and sixth seasons as a coach, respectively.

== Discography ==
=== Studio albums ===
Title	Details	Peak chart positions	Certifications	Sales
Title	Details	POL	Certifications	Sales
Byle być sobą	Released: 13 November 2015; Label: Sony Music Entertainment Poland; Format: CD, digital download, streaming	1	ZPAV: 2× Platinum	POL: 60,000
Dreamer	Released: 7 September 2018; Label: Sony Music Entertainment Poland; Format: CD, digital download, streaming	1	ZPAV: Gold	POL: 15,000
Nadwiślański mrok	Released: 24 November 2023; Label: Warner Music Poland; Format: CD, LP, digital download, streaming	35		

=== Extended plays ===
Title	Details
XI	Released: 13 December 2011; Label: Universal Music Poland; Format: CD, digital download, streaming
Dreamer EP	Released: 21 September 2018; Label: Sony Music Entertainment Poland; Format: Digital download, streaming

=== Singles ===
Title	Year	Peak chart positions			Certifications	Sales	Album
Title	Year	POL	AUT	FRA	Certifications	Sales	Album
"Po niebo"	2011	—	—	—			XI
"Rewolucja"	2011	—	—	—			XI
"Jesteś bohaterem/Real Hero"	2015	—	—	—	ZPAV: Gold	POL: 10,000	Byle być sobą
"Byle być sobą"	2015	—	—	—			Byle być sobą
"Such Is Life"	2015	—	—	—			Byle być sobą
"Color of Your Life"	2016	34	66	156	ZPAV: Diamond	POL: 100,000	Byle być sobą
"Rosanna"	2016	—	—	—			Byle być sobą
"Tic Tac Clock"	2017	—	—	—			Byle być sobą
"Don't Poison Your Heart"	2017	35	—	—			Dreamer
"King of the Season"	2018	—	—	—			Dreamer
"Rainbow"	2018	—	—	—			Dreamer
"Dreamer (Thanks To You My Friends)"	2018	—	—	—			Dreamer
"Polska to kobieta" (with Swiernalis)	2020	—	—	—			Non-album single
"Hiob"	2021	—	—	—			Nadwiślański mrok
"Halo wodospad"	2022	—	—	—			Non-album singles
"24na7"	2022	—	—	—			Non-album singles
"Warszawianka (mrok)"	2022	—	—	—			Nadwiślański mrok
"We Need a Coco"	2023	—	—	—			Nadwiślański mrok
"Smutek (a może mniej)"	2023	—	—	—			Nadwiślański mrok
"Bondage"	2024	—	—	—			Nadwiślański mrok
"Fire"	2026	—	—	—			TBA
"Maj"	2026	57	—	—			TBA
"Kochanie!"	2026	—	—	—			Syrenka Picassa
"Do ciebie, mamo" (with Violetta Villas)	2026	—	—	—			Violetta Villas
"—" denotes a single that did not chart or were not released.

=== As featured artist ===
Title	Year	Album
"Zanim" (Barbara Wrońska featuring Michał Szpak)	2020	Music 4 Queers & Queens
"Żegnam cię mój świecie wesoły" (Polskie Znaki featuring Michał Szpak)	2021	Rzeczy ostatnie
"Opio" (Koza and Molehead featuring Michał Szpak and Adi Nowak)	2024	Kusz

=== Promotional singles ===
Title	Year	Album
"Gaja"	2023	Nadwiślański mrok

== Tours ==
- XI Tour (2012)
- Color of Your Life Tour (2016–2017)
- Classica Tour (2018)
- Love is Love Tour (2023)

== Awards and nominations ==
- 2011: Polish Edition of The X Factor – second place
- 2011: Poland Style & Design Awards for Creative Performance & Achievement Emerging Talent
- 2013: Golden Samovar – Russian Song Festival 2013 in Zielona Góra
- 2015: Super Premieres – 1st Prize at the 52. National Festival of Polish Song in Opole
- 2016: Winner of the Polish national selection for the Eurovision Song Contest
- 2016: Eighth place on the Eurovision Song Contest 2016 in Stockholm
- 2016: Personality of The Year – grand gala "Plejady Gwiazd"
- 2016: Superartist and Grand Prix Opole 2016 Award at the 53. National Festival of Polish Song in Opole

Awards and achievements
Preceded by Monika Kuszyńska with "In the Name of Love"	Poland in the Eurovision Song Contest; 2016	Succeeded by Kasia Moś with "Flashlight"
