= Poland in the Eurovision Song Contest 2023 =

- Eurovision Song Contest 2023
- Participating broadcaster: Telewizja Polska (TVP)
- Country: Poland
- Selection process: Tu bije serce Europy! Wybieramy hit na Eurowizję!
- Selection date: 26 February 2023

Competing entry
- Song: "Solo"
- Artist: Blanka
- Songwriters: Blanka Stajkow; Maciej Puchalski; Mikołaj Trybulec; Bartłomiej Rzeczycki; Marcin Górecki; Maria Broberg; Julia Sundberg

Placement
- Semi-final result: Qualified (3rd, 124 points)
- Final result: 19th, 93 points

Participation chronology

Poland was represented at the Eurovision Song Contest 2023 with the song "Solo" performed by Blanka. The Polish participating broadcaster, Telewizja Polska (TVP), organised the national final Tu bije serce Europy! Wybieramy hit na Eurowizję! in order to select its entry for the contest.

Poland was drawn to compete in the second semi-final of the Eurovision Song Contest which took place on 11 May 2023. Performing during the show in position 92, "Solo" was announced among the top 10 entries of the second semi-final and therefore qualified to compete in the final on 13 May. It was later revealed that Poland placed third out of the 16 participating countries in the semi-final with 124 points. In the final, Poland performed in position 4 and placed nineteenth out of the 26 participating countries, scoring 93 points.

== Background ==
Prior to the 2023 contest, Poland had participated in the Eurovision Song Contest twenty-four times since its first entry in 1994. Poland's highest placement in the contest, to this point, has been second place, which the nation achieved with its debut entry in 1994 with the song "To nie ja!" performed by Edyta Górniak. Poland has only reached the top ten on two other occasions, when Ich Troje performing the song "Keine Grenzen – Żadnych granic" finished seventh in 2003, and when Michał Szpak performing the song "Color of Your Life" finished eighth in 2016. Between 2005 and 2011, Poland failed to qualify from the semi-final round six out of seven years with only their 2008 entry, "For Life" performed by Isis Gee, managing to take the nation to the final during that period. After once again failing to qualify to the final in 2011, the country withdrew from the contest throughout 2013. Since returning to the contest in 2014, Poland managed to qualify to the final each year before failing to qualify to the final between 2018 and 2021. In 2022, Ochman brought Poland back to the final, eventually finishing 12th with his song "River".

The Polish national broadcaster, Telewizja Polska (TVP), broadcasts the event within Poland and organises the selection process for the nation's entry. The broadcaster opted to select the Polish entry for the 2022 contest during a national selection show titled Tu bije serce Europy! Wybieramy hit na Eurowizję!, a process that was continued for their 2023 entry.

== Before Eurovision ==
=== Tu bije serce Europy! Wybieramy hit na Eurowizję! ===
Tu bije serce Europy! Wybieramy hit na Eurowizję! ("Here beats the heart of Europe! We're choosing the hit for Eurovision!") was the national final organised by TVP in order to select the Polish entry for the Eurovision Song Contest 2023. The show was held on 26 February 2023 in the Transcolor Studio in Warsaw, hosted by Aleksander Sikora, Ida Nowakowska and Małgorzata Tomaszewska, and broadcast on TVP1 and TVP Polonia, as well as online via the platform TVP VOD. The national final was watched, according to the Average Minute Rating, by 1.5 million people, with a recorded market share of 10.6%. According to Nielsen Audience Measurement, the show attracted 1.1 million viewers, while the Real Viewership Model reported the number to be 1.4 million.

==== Competing entries ====
TVP opened a submission period for interested artists and songwriters to submit their entries between 19 September 2022 and 10 February 2023. The broadcaster received 300 submissions at the closing of the deadline. Interested applicants were recommended to take part in the songwriting process of their entries. A five-member selection committee consisting of a representative of TVP, a radio personality, a music expert, a journalist and a representative of the Polish Musicians Union selected ten entries from the received submissions to compete in the national final. Ten finalists were announced on 15 February 2023 during the TVP2 programme Pytanie na śniadanie. Among the competing artists was Alicja Szemplińska, who was due to represent Poland in the Eurovision Song Contest 2020 before its cancellation. The competing artists were required to submit a promotional video for their song to TVP by 20 February 2023.

On 23 February, Janusz Daszczyński, journalist and former chairman of TVP, expressed outrage at the participation of the song "Booty" performed by Ahlena, claiming that the lyrics of the entry were obscene and not fit for being broadcast on public television. The issue was discussed during a programme council meeting held the same day, which resulted in Ahlena being asked to change parts of the song, which she complied with.

Artist	Song	Songwriter(s)
Ahlena	"Booty"	Magdalena Pawłowska; Maksymilian Niemczyk
Alicja Szemplińska	"New Home"	Alicja Szemplińska; Chloe Martini; Farrah Guenena
Blanka	"Solo"	Blanka Stajkow; Maciej Puchalski; Mikołaj Trybulec; Bartłomiej Rzeczycki; Marcin Górecki; Maria Broberg; Julia Sundberg
Dominik Dudek	"Be Good"	Dominik Dudek; Mateusz Kotowski; Patryk Kumór; Dominic Buczkowski-Wojtaszek
Felivers	"Never Back Down"	Miłosz Fergiński; Konrad Jażdżyk
Jann	"Gladiator"	Jan Rozmanowski
Kuba Szmajkowski	"You Do Me"	Thomas Karlsson; Joakim Övrenius; Julia Nilcrantz
Maja Hyży	"Never Hide"	Wojciech Stekla; Aleksandra Lewandowska
Natasza	"Lift U Up"	Natasza Urbańska; Jan Bielecki; Twan Ray
Yan Majewski	"Champion"	Mikołaj Trybulec; Ashley Hicklin; Bastien Kaltenbacher; Marine Kaltenbacher

==== Final ====
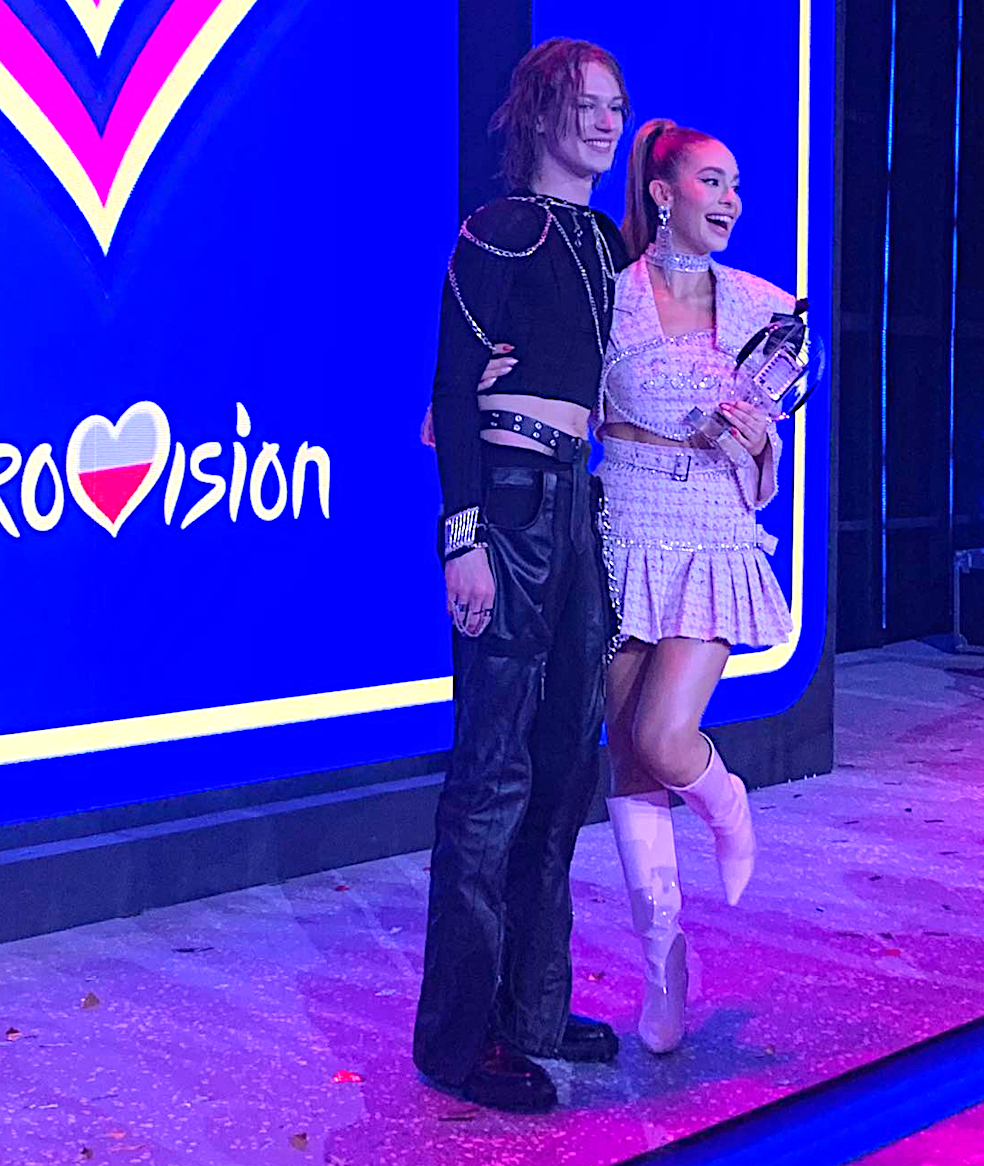
The top two of Tu bije serce Europy! Wybieramy hit na Eurowizję!, winner Blanka (right) and runner-up Jann (left)

The final took place on 26 February 2023. Ten entries competed in the national final, with the winner determined by a 50/50 combination of votes from a five-member professional jury and a public vote. In the event of a tie, it would be decided in favour of the jury. The jury that voted during the show consisted of chairperson Edyta Górniak (singer, runner-up of the Eurovision Song Contest 1994), as well as Agustin Egurrola (choreographer), Aneta Woźniak (Programme Director of TVP), Marcin Kusy (President of the Polish Radio Program I) and Marek Sierocki (music journalist, commentator of the Eurovision Song Contest in Poland). In addition to the performances of the competing entries, the show was opened by 2021 Greek Eurovision entrant Stefania and 2022 Eurovision winners Kalush Orchestra, while the interval acts included 1994 Polish entrant and jury member Edyta Górniak, 2021 Azerbaijani entrant Efendi, 2022 Polish Eurovision entrant Ochman, as well as former Polish Junior Eurovision entrants Roksana Węgiel and Sara James, who represented the country in 2018 and 2021, respectively.

The jury ranking and the overall ranking were revealed during the live show, while the televote ranking was revealed on 27 February following public pressure. In June 2024, in a court case between OGAE Poland and TVP, the Voivodeship Administrative Court of Warsaw ordered TVP to publish the detailed results, which were deemed public information. The detailed televoting results were published by OGAE Poland on 6 December 2024.

Final – 26 February 2023
R/O	Artist	Song	Jury	Televote		Total	Place
R/O	Artist	Song	Jury	Votes	Points	Total	Place
1	Natasza	"Lift U Up"	6	571	2	8	7
2	Kuba Szmajkowski	"You Do Me"	3	751	3	6	8
3	Ahlena	"Booty"	1	340	1	2	10
4	Dominik Dudek	"Be Good"	10	5,823	8	18	3
5	Alicja Szemplińska	"New Home"	5	3,647	5	10	6
6	Felivers	"Never Back Down"	8	4,123	6	14	4
7	Maja Hyży	"Never Hide"	2	857	4	6	9
8	Jann	"Gladiator"	7	18,665	12	19	2
9	Blanka	"Solo"	12	6,020	10	22	1
10	Yan Majewski	"Champion"	4	4,576	7	11	5

==== Controversy ====
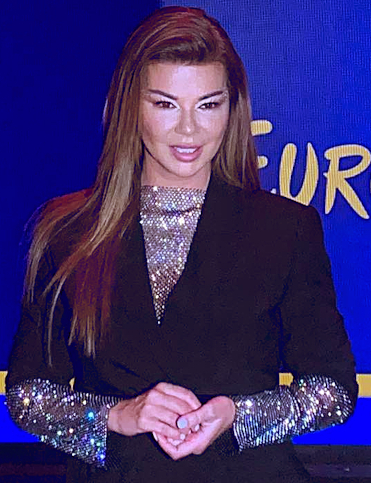
Jury chairperson Edyta Górniak following Tu bije serce Europy! Wybieramy hit na Eurowizję!

Throughout the jury voting sequence, where Jann received only 7 points despite being the overwhelming favourite to win, booing could be heard throughout the audience. Following Tu bije serce Europy! Wybieramy hit na Eurowizję!, accusations were made against TVP and the jury of alleged deals with winner Blanka, who had been heavily promoted by the broadcaster beforehand. In addition, viewers accused the jury of intentionally lowering the score of Jann in favor of the eventual winner, which caused demands for the results to be annulled. It was alleged that Blanka and Allan Krupa, son of Edyta Górniak (chairman of the jury), knew each other personally, which Krupa later denied. The votes of jury member Agustin Egurrola were also questioned, as Blanka's dance troupe consisted of dancers from the Volt Dance Group, which is owned by Egurrola, leading to allegations of cronyism.

Shortly prior to the show, TVP changed the format of the results sequence, which was originally supposed to be held in a similar way to 2022 with two voting rounds and proportional rankings. Multiple sites later reported that the viewers cast three times as many votes for Jann than runner-up Blanka, which caused further outrage, with viewers criticising the impact the jury had on the result with the new voting system.

Following the final, two petitions appeared, in which Internet users demanded a change of representative. The two petitions gained over 87,000 signatures combined. Five major Polish fan portals, namely Eurowizja.org (jointly with the Polish OGAE fanclub), Dziennik Eurowizyjny, Dobry Wieczór Europo, Misja Eurowizja and Let's Talk About ESC, petitioned for TVP to reveal the split results of the selection, which, together with the issue of the allegations of fixing the results, would be examined by an "independent, external company". An official appeal was sent to TVP on 2 March. TVP then issued a statement on 9 March, claiming that it "complied with the voting rules in accordance with the regulations" and that the voting was "supervised by a notary present during the final".

On 17 July 2023, an official complaint was filed by OGAE Polska regarding the matter to the Voivodeship Administrative Court of Warsaw, with the court deciding in June 2024 that the detailed results were public information and obliging TVP to publish them.

=== Promotion ===
In order to promote "Solo" as the Polish entry for the 2023 contest, Blanka embarked on a promotional tour throughout Europe. She was set to perform during the Moldovan national final Etapa națională 2023 as a guest, however, her flight to the event was cancelled. Kicking off her international promotional activities on 10 March 2023 performing at the Melfest WKND in Stockholm, she then travelled to Barcelona to attend the Eurovision pre-party held on 25 March 2023, then to Tel Aviv on 3 April, where she performed at Israel Calling in Hangar 11, and to Madrid on 8 April 2023, where she performed at the PrePartyES in Sala La Riviera. She was also due to make appearances at the Eurovision in Concert 2023 at Amsterdam's AFAS Live on 15 April 2023 and the London Eurovision Party at London's Here at Outernet venue on 16 April, but withdrew from them due to illness.

== At Eurovision ==
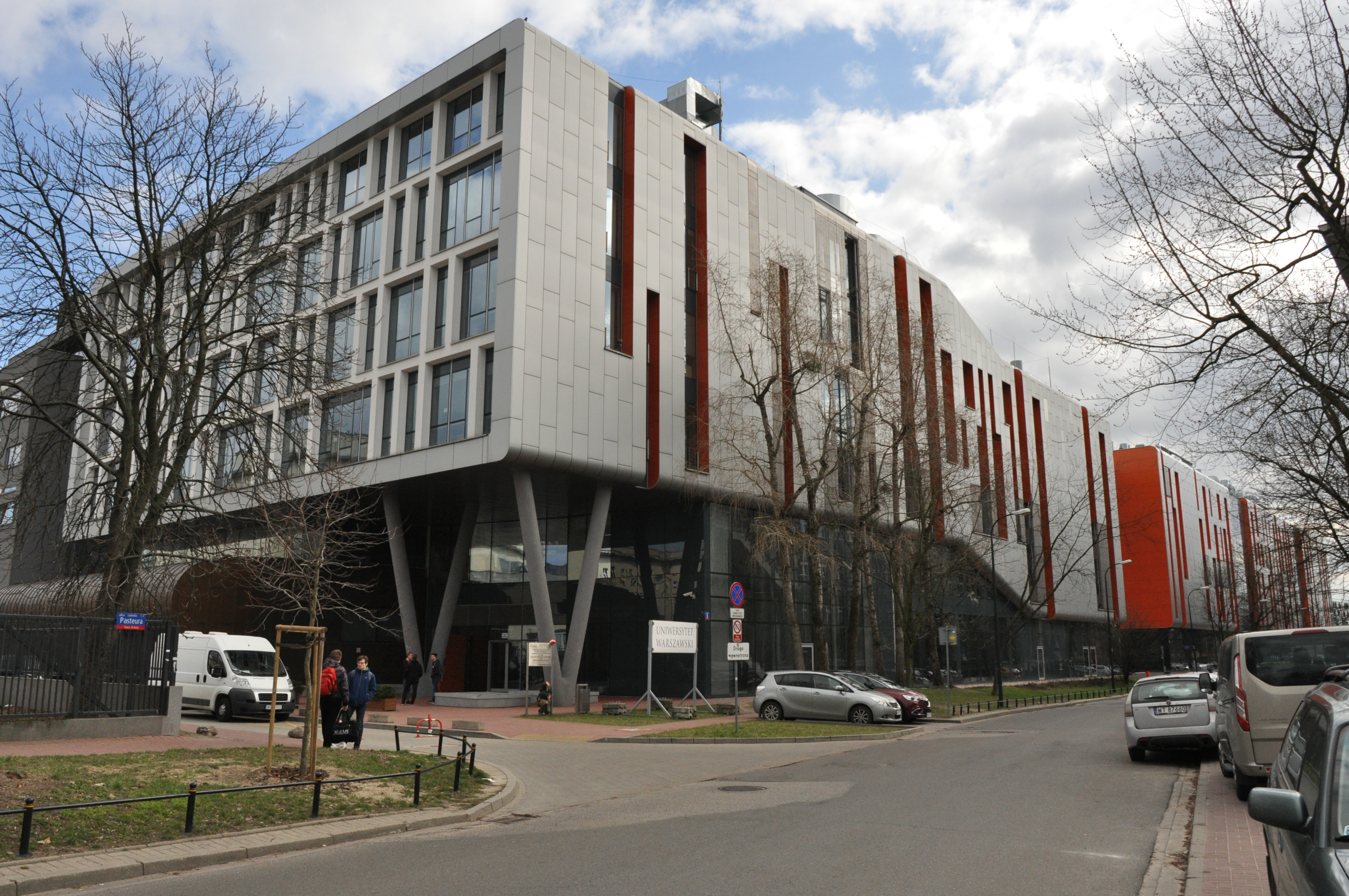
A video postcard introduced Blanka's performance in the second semi-final of the Eurovision Song Contest 2023. The postcard was filmed at the Faculty of Physics at the University of Warsaw in March 2023 in collaboration with the host broadcaster BBC.

According to Eurovision rules, all nations with the exceptions of the host country and the "Big Five" (France, Germany, Italy, Spain and the United Kingdom) are required to qualify from one of two semi-finals in order to compete for the final; the top ten countries from each semi-final progress to the final. The European Broadcasting Union (EBU) split up the competing countries into six different pots based on voting patterns from previous contests, with countries with favourable voting histories put into the same pot. On 31 January 2023, an allocation draw was held, which placed each country into one of the two semi-finals, and determined which half of the show they would perform in. Poland has been placed into the second semi-final, to be held on 11 May 2023, and has been scheduled to perform in the second half of the show.

Once all the competing songs for the 2023 contest had been released, the running order for the semi-finals was decided by the shows' producers rather than through another draw, so that similar songs were not placed next to each other. Poland was set to perform in position 9, following the entry from Greece and before the entry from Slovenia.

At the end of the show, Poland was announced as a qualifier for the final.

=== Voting ===
==== Points awarded to Poland ====
Points awarded to Poland (Semi-final 2)
Score	Televote
12 points	Lithuania; Ukraine
10 points	Iceland; United Kingdom
8 points	Armenia; Estonia; Georgia; Slovenia
7 points	Albania; Austria; Belgium; Denmark
6 points	Cyprus
5 points	Greece
4 points	Spain
3 points	Romania
2 points	San Marino (Note: San Marino uses a jury in the semi-finals.)
1 point	

Points awarded to Poland (Final)
Score	Televote	Jury
12 points	Ukraine	
10 points		
8 points	Ireland; Lithuania; United Kingdom	
7 points	Iceland	
6 points	Norway	Ukraine
5 points	Armenia; Denmark	
4 points	Belgium; Germany; Moldova	
3 points	Estonia	
2 points	Cyprus; Netherlands	Belgium; Israel
1 point	Albania; San Marino; Slovenia	Armenia; Romania

==== Points awarded by Poland ====
Points awarded by Poland (Semi-final 2)
Score	Televote
12 points	Slovenia
10 points	Austria
8 points	Australia
7 points	Cyprus
6 points	Lithuania
5 points	Armenia
4 points	Albania
3 points	Belgium
2 points	Estonia
1 point	Georgia

Points awarded by Poland (Final)
Score	Televote	Jury
12 points	Ukraine	Israel
10 points	Finland	Cyprus
8 points	Norway	Estonia
7 points	Sweden	Sweden
6 points	Croatia	Italy
5 points	Israel	Belgium
4 points	Cyprus	Australia
3 points	Czech Republic	Lithuania
2 points	Slovenia	Switzerland
1 point	Lithuania	Armenia

==== Detailed voting results ====
The following members comprised the Polish jury:

- Grzegorz Urban
- Marcin Kusy
- Zygmunt Kukla
- Kamila Sowińska
- Agnieszka Wilczynska

Detailed voting results from Poland (Semi-final 2)
R/O	Country	Televote	
R/O	Country	Rank	Points
01	Denmark	13	
02	Armenia	6	5
03	Romania	15	
04	Estonia	9	2
05	Belgium	8	3
06	Cyprus	4	7
07	Iceland	11	
08	Greece	12	
09	Poland		
10	Slovenia	1	12
11	Georgia	10	1
12	San Marino	14	
13	Austria	2	10
14	Albania	7	4
15	Lithuania	5	6
16	Australia	3	8

Detailed voting results from Poland (Final)
R/O	Country	Jury							Televote	
R/O	Country	Juror 1	Juror 2	Juror 3	Juror 4	Juror 5	Rank	Points	Rank	Points
01	Austria	11	8	16	8	12	11		17	
02	Portugal	15	20	19	13	19	19		25	
03	Switzerland	6	7	17	15	7	9	2	15	
04	Poland									
05	Serbia	13	23	18	19	23	20		21	
06	France	18	13	12	6	18	12		13	
07	Cyprus	1	5	3	14	1	2	10	7	4
08	Spain	16	9	10	11	17	13		22	
09	Sweden	3	10	1	1	11	4	7	4	7
10	Albania	19	17	23	25	20	22		24	
11	Italy	5	6	5	2	10	5	6	11	
12	Estonia	4	1	4	4	6	3	8	20	
13	Finland	20	24	22	23	24	24		2	10
14	Czech Republic	17	18	13	16	16	18		8	3
15	Australia	7	4	14	5	5	7	4	19	
16	Belgium	12	3	15	3	3	6	5	18	
17	Armenia	10	12	6	12	8	10	1	14	
18	Moldova	24	19	21	22	21	23		12	
19	Ukraine	14	15	7	18	15	14		1	12
20	Norway	9	16	11	17	13	15		3	8
21	Germany	25	22	24	20	14	21		16	
22	Lithuania	8	14	9	7	4	8	3	10	1
23	Israel	2	2	2	10	2	1	12	6	5
24	Slovenia	23	11	8	21	22	17		9	2
25	Croatia	22	25	25	24	25	25		5	6
26	United Kingdom	21	21	20	9	9	16		23	
