= Gladiator (Jann song) =

2022 song by Jann Rozmanowski

Single by Jann
- Released: 14 October 2022
- Genre: Electronic rock; R&B
- Length: 3:32
- Label: Fonobo
- Songwriter: Jan Rozmanowski
- Producers: Jan Rozmanowski, Jeremiasz Hendzel

Jann singles chronology
"Promise" (2022)	"Gladiator" (2022)	"Need a break" (2023)

Music video
- "Gladiator" on YouTube

"Gladiator" is a single by Polish singer Jann. The song was released on 14 October 2022 via Fonobo Label and was a candidate to represent Poland in the 67th edition of the Eurovision Song Contest, taking part in its preselection, Tu bije serce Europy! Wybieramy hit na Eurowizję (transl. Here beats the heart of Europe! We choose the hit for Eurovision). Entering as the favourite to win the contest, the song was upset by Blanka's "Solo".

It has performed well on the Polish charts and streaming services, reaching number two. The song, along with Rozmanowski himself, have become a viral phenomenon due to the song's upset by "Solo" and the controversy that came around the victory of Stajkow.

== Background and composition ==
In interviews, Rozmanowski stated that the song is a satire of both the music industry and show business. In the song, he stated that he wanted to give the listener a "taste of stardom", showcasing the dark nature of the music industry; mainly, the fact that artists' fanbases and their management portray and exploit artists just as "beautiful people", with reckless abandon on taking care of the artists as human beings.

In the Great September music festival in 2022, Jann stated that the song was "a romantic, sometimes almost erotic mix of electronics, R&B, and pop in the style of Sean Nicholas Savage, Sohn, Son Lux, or RY X... all this creates a tasty, pampered whole, filled to the brim with emotions".

== Chart performance ==
On the issue of 9 March, the song was charted second in Poland, falling behind Miley Cyrus' "Flowers". Along with this, the song had seen an increased amount of streams on streaming service Spotify, earning the top spot on numerous Viral 50 charts.

== Live performances ==
=== Tu bije serce Europy! Wybieramy hit na Eurowizję ===
On 8 January 2023, OGAE Poland reported that Rozmanowski was interested in taking part in Tu bije serce Europy! Wybieramy hit na Eurowizję, the Polish national final hosted by TVP1 that selected the Polish entry for the Eurovision Song Contest. A month later, on 15 February, "Gladiator" was announced as one of ten candidates selected by TVP1 to participate in Tu bije serce Europy! Wybieramy hit na Eurowizję in February 2023 for a chance to represent Poland in the Eurovision Song Contest 2023. Immediately after the song was announced as a finalist, the song was regarded as the red hot favourite to win the selection, gaining fan support. Shortly before the final, a fan poll hosted by Eurovision fansite Wiwibloggs reported that "Gladiator" had won the poll with 66.56% of the vote.

The final took place on 26 February 2023, with "Gladiator" being drawn to perform eighth in the final. The performance featured Rozmanowski in a black crop-top and pants adorned with jewels. The winner was determined by a 50/50 combination of votes from a five-member professional jury and a public vote. In the event of a tie, the tie would be decided in favour of the jury. At the initial reveal of the voting results, "Gladiator" was revealed to have gotten seven points from the jury, coming in fourth place. Polish singer and model Blanka Stajkow, who entered the song "Solo", had earned the maximum amount of jury points, with 12 points. At the end of the show, "Solo" was announced the winner without announcing the full televote scores. Due to the initial secrecy of the televote scores and the low jury placing, the victory came under heavy scrutiny, with many claiming that the victory was rigged in favour of Blanka. Facing increased pressure from fans, TVP1 released the televote results, which revealed that "Gladiator" had won the televote, but "Solo" had come second, leaving "Gladiator" three points short of tying.

Fan reactions towards the victory initially were overwhelmingly negative of Blanka, with petitions being made that demanded that TVP change the representative to Jann. Along with this, various major Polish Eurovision fan sites proposed an independent count of votes. TVP, after hearing an appeal to change the country's representative to Jann, decided to stick with Blanka, saying that the voting had "complied with the voting rules in accordance with the regulations". In the Eurovision Song Contest 2023, Blanka would manage to qualify from the second semi-final in third, finishing in the final in 19th place.

Jann congratulated Blanka after she had won, even after increased pressure and hatred towards both TVP and Blanka from fans grew due to the voting system and the secrecy of the televote results. In statements, Blanka thanked Jann for his support, saying "We both don't understand such a huge wave of hate that is pouring out on me... From this place, I would like to thank Jann very much, because you are not only a wonderful, phenomenal artist, but also a wonderful person. Thank you from the bottom of my heart for all your support."

== Charts ==
=== Weekly charts ===
Chart performance for "Gladiator"
Chart (2023)	Peak position
Lithuania (AGATA)	13
Poland (Billboard)	2
Poland (Polish Streaming Top 100)	2

== Certifications ==
Certifications for "Gladiator"
Region	Certification	Certified units/sales
Poland (ZPAV)	Diamond	250,000^{‡}
^{‡} Sales+streaming figures based on certification alone.
