= Solo (Blanka song) =

2022 song by Blanka

Single by Blanka
- Released: September 23, 2022
- Genre: Cod-reggae; pop
- Length: 2:34; 2:57 (Eurovision version)
- Label: Warner Music Poland
- Composers: Blanka Stajkow; Maciej Puchalski; Mikołaj Trybulec; Bartłomiej Rzeczycki; Marcin Górecki
- Lyricists: Blanka Stajkow; Maria Broberg; Julia Sundberg
- Producers: Tribbs; Puchalski

Blanka singles chronology
"Better" (2021)	"Solo" (2022)	"Boys Like Toys" (2023)

Music video
- "Solo" on YouTube

Eurovision Song Contest 2023 entry
- Country: Poland
- Artist: Blanka
- Language: English
- Composers: Blanka Stajkow; Maciej Puchalski; Mikołaj Trybulec; Bartłomiej Rzeczycki; Marcin Górecki
- Lyricists: Blanka Stajkow; Maria Broberg; Julia Sundberg

Finals performance
- Semi-final result: 3rd
- Semi-final points: 124
- Final result: 19th
- Final points: 93

Entry chronology
- ◄ "River" (2022)
- "The Tower" (2024) ►

Official performance video
- "Solo" (Second Semi-Final) on YouTube "Solo" (Grand Final) on YouTube

"Solo" is a song by Polish singer and model Blanka, released on 23 September 2022. It represented Poland in the Eurovision Song Contest 2023 after winning Tu bije serce Europy! Wybieramy hit na Eurowizję, Poland's national final for that year's Eurovision Song Contest. The song finished 19th with 93 points. It reached number one in Lithuania and Poland (later certified two-times diamond in Poland for estimated sales of 500,000 units) and the top 25 in Iceland, Czech Republic, Finland and Greece. It also reached number 56 in the UK.

== Background and composition ==
According to Blanka, the song is about a relationship that is one-sided and a "sham", where one loses "their head for someone" yet the other person in the relationship is "playing [with them]." The song represents her belief that "sometimes it's worth being alone and that's OK... we can get to know ourselves better and see that the other person may not be the best for us." Vulture writer Jon O'Brien noted that "Solo" is a "summery cod-reggae throwback" reminiscent of the Swedish group Ace of Base and i's Anna Bonet labelled the song "upbeat pop", comparing it to the likes of singers Ariana Grande and Dua Lipa.

== Eurovision Song Contest ==
=== Tu bije serce Europy! Wybieramy hit na Eurowizję ===
Tu bije serce Europy! Wybieramy hit na Eurowizję ("Here beats the heart of Europe! We choose the hit for Eurovision") was the national final organised by TVP that selected the Polish entry for the Eurovision Song Contest 2023. The show was held on 26 February 2023, with 10 artists and their songs competing. The winner was determined by a 50/50 combination of votes from a five-member professional jury and a public vote. In the event of a tie, the tie would be decided in favour of the jury.

On 15 February 2023, "Solo" was announced as one of the ten songs competing in the contest. Heading into the final, the song wasn't considered a heavy favorite to win the contest, being beat out by what was considered the favorite according to a Eurovision fan-site poll, Jann's "Gladiator". In the final, the song would manage to score 22 points, earning 12 points from the juries and placing second in the public vote. As a result, the song went on to represent Poland in the Eurovision Song Contest 2023.

=== At Eurovision ===
According to Eurovision rules, all nations with the exceptions of the host country and the "Big Five" (France, Germany, Italy, Spain and the United Kingdom) are required to qualify from one of two semi-finals in order to compete for the final; the top ten countries from each semi-final progress to the final. The European Broadcasting Union (EBU) split up the competing countries into six different pots based on voting patterns from previous contests, with countries with favourable voting histories put into the same pot. On 31 January 2023, an allocation draw was held, which placed each country into one of the two semi-finals, and determined which half of the show they would perform in. Poland had been placed into the second semi-final, which was held on 11 May 2023, and performed in the second half of the show. The song was announced as one of the qualifiers to move onto the grand final, and was drawn to perform fourth in a field of 26 songs. In the final, the song finished in 19th place, scoring 93 points: 81 points from televoting and 12 points from juries.

=== Controversy ===
The song's win in Tu bije serce Europy! Wybieramy hit na Eurowizję sparked controversy in Poland due to alleged rigged votes and corruption within the jury panel for the national selection.

Before the contest, the opening line of the song, "Baby / It's kind of crazy", became an Internet meme due to Blanka's pronunciation of the opening line. Over time, the line would be mocked, with Polish media and people coining the term "Bejba, it's kajna krejsa", with the term becoming popular across Poland to both mock TVP and Blanka. Blanka would respond by wearing a dress during the contest's Turquoise Carpet before the contest, wearing a green dress with the word "Bejba" written in pink at the back of her dress. After she qualified from the second semi-final, in a response to a question about the song's promotion and widespread phenomenon as a meme, Blanka would say "Well, I want to thank all the haters because they really motivated me... I really hope that I can make my country really proud in the finals."

== Track listing ==
Digital download / streaming

1. "Solo" – 2:34

Digital download / streaming – Christmas Bell version

1. "Solo" (Christmas Bell version) [Live] – 2:43
2. "Solo" – 2:34

Digital download / streaming – Audiosoulz remix

1. "Solo" (Audiosoulz remix) – 2:38

Digital download / streaming – Acoustic version

1. "Solo" (Acoustic) [Live] – 2:43
2. "Solo" – 2:34

Digital download / streaming – SMYLES remix

1. "Solo" (SMYLES remix) – 2:24

Digital download / streaming – Sped up version

1. "Solo" (Sped up version)" – 2:11

Digital download / streaming – Dance Break

1. "Solo" (Dance Break)" – 2:57

== Charts ==
=== Weekly charts ===
Chart performance for "Solo"
Chart (2022–2023)	Peak position
Czech Republic (Rádio – Top 100)	12
Czech Republic Singles Digital (ČNS IFPI)	39
Finland (Suomen virallinen lista)	24
Germany Downloads (GfK Entertainment)	36
Greece International (IFPI)	24
Iceland (Tónlistinn)	11
Ireland (IRMA)	85
Latvia Airplay (TopHit)	31
Lithuania (AGATA)	1
Lithuania Airplay (TopHit)	10
Poland Airplay (ZPAV)	4
Poland (Polish Streaming Top 100)	1
Sweden Heatseeker (Sverigetopplistan)	3
Ukraine Airplay (TopHit)	166
UK Singles (Official Charts)	56

=== Year-end charts ===
2022 year-end chart performance for "Solo"
Chart (2022)	Position
Poland (Polish Airplay Top 100)	87

2023 year-end chart performance for "Solo"
Chart (2023)	Position
Poland (Polish Streaming Top 100)	16

== Certifications ==
Certifications for "Solo"
Region	Certification	Certified units/sales
Poland (ZPAV)	2× Diamond	500,000^{‡}
^{‡} Sales+streaming figures based on certification alone.

== Release history ==
Release dates and formats for "Solo"
Region	Date	Format(s)	Version	Label(s)	Ref.
Various	23 September 2022	Digital download; streaming	Original	Warner Poland; Ale Label	
Various	15 December 2022	Digital download; streaming	Christmas Bell	Warner Poland; Ale Label	
Various	20 December 2022	Digital download; streaming	Audiosoulz remix	Warner Poland; Ale Label	
Various	3 January 2023	Digital download; streaming	Acoustic	Warner Poland; Ale Label	
Various	5 May 2023	Digital download; streaming	SMYLES remix	Warner Poland; Ale Label	
Various	11 May 2023	Digital download; streaming	Sped up	Warner Poland; Ale Label	
Italy	22 May 2023	Radio airplay	Original	Warner	
Various	10 October 2024	Digital download; streaming	Dance Break	Warner Poland; Ale Label	
