= Krystian Ochman =

Ochman
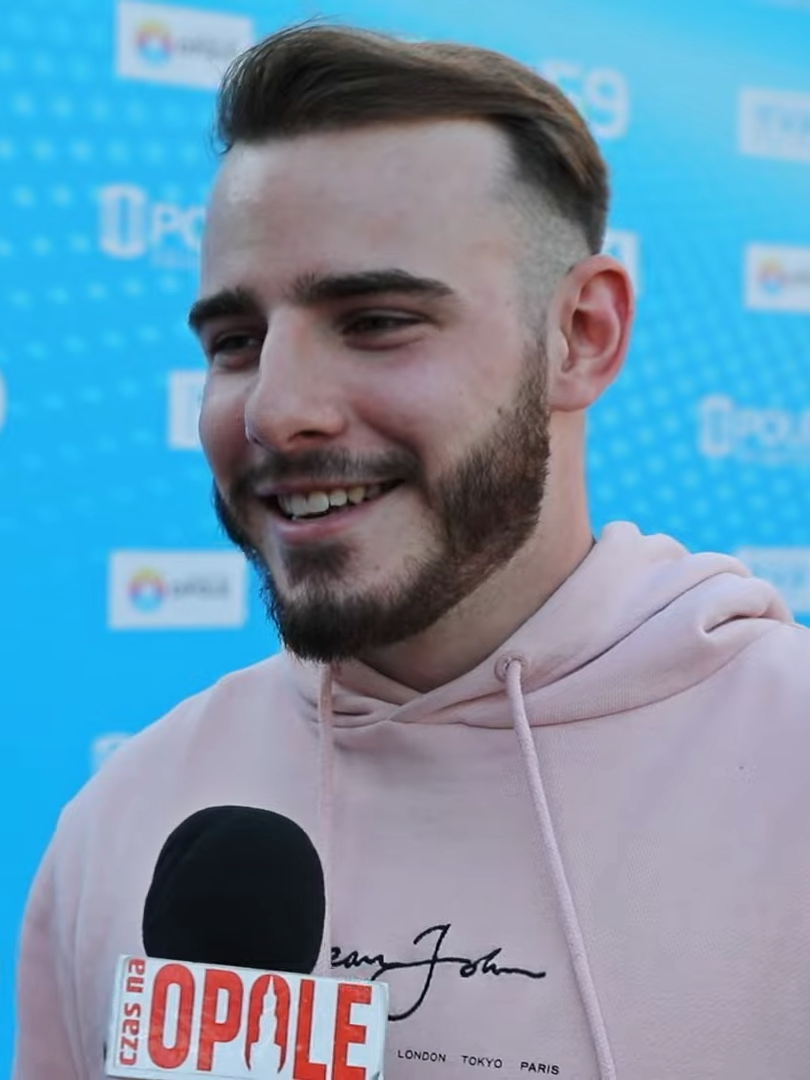
- Ochman in June 2022

Background information
- Born: Krystian Ochman; 19 July 1999 (age 27); Melrose, Massachusetts, U.S.
- Origin: Warsaw, Poland
- Genres: Pop; classical crossover; trip hop
- Occupations: Singer; songwriter
- Instrument: Vocals
- Years active: 2020–present
- Label: Universal Music Polska

Krystian Jan Ochman (Polish pronunciation: [ˈkrɨstjan ˈɔxman]; born 19 July 1999), known professionally as Ochman, is a Polish-American singer-songwriter. He rose to fame after winning the eleventh season of The Voice of Poland and represented Poland in the Eurovision Song Contest 2022 with the song "River".

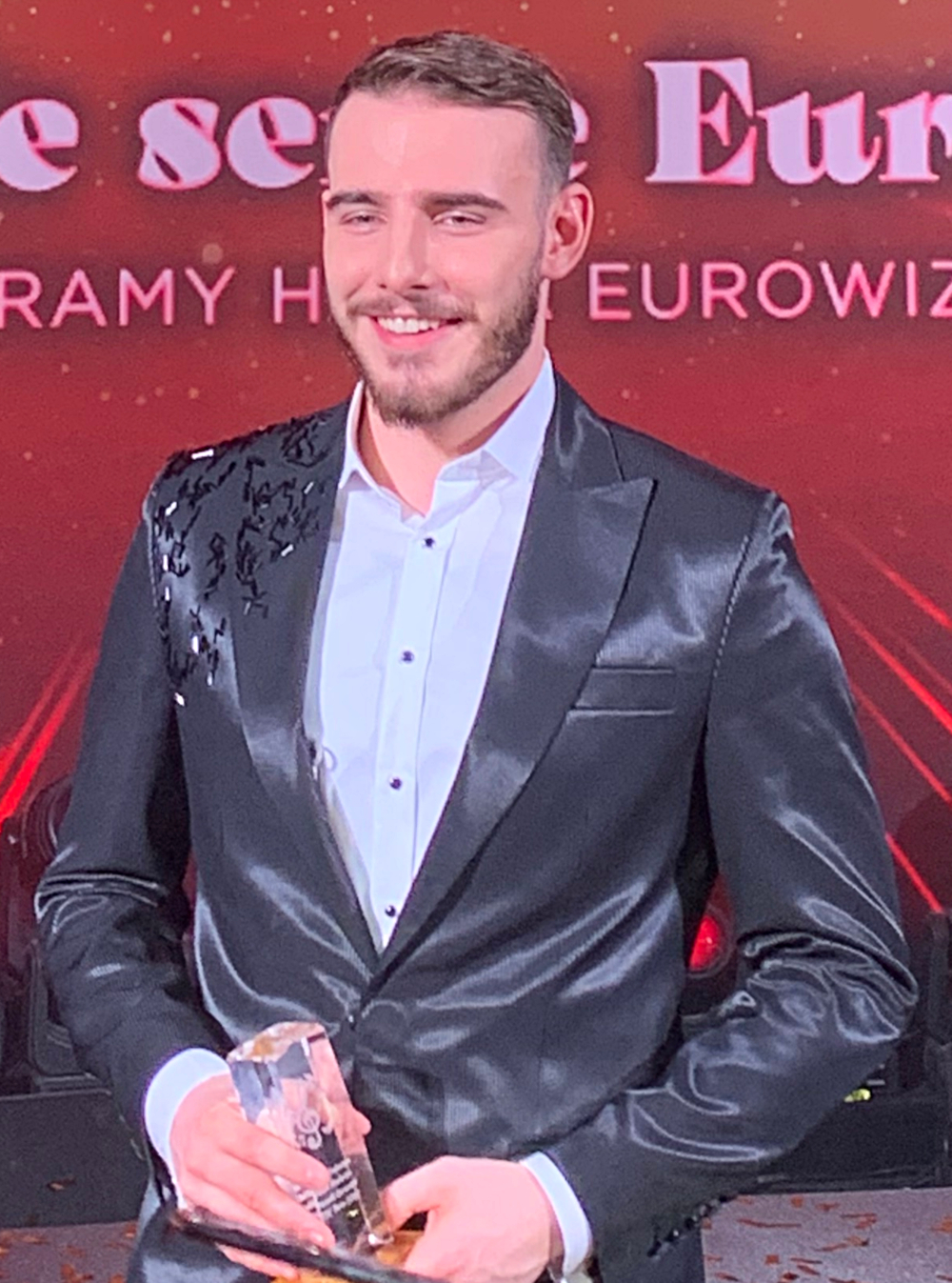
Ochman after winning Tu bije serce Europy! Wybieramy hit na Eurowizję in February 2022.

== Early life ==
Ochman was born in Melrose, Massachusetts to a Polish family. He started to take singing lessons during his high school years and later played the role of the prince in a musical production of Cinderella. Ochman graduated from Thomas Sprigg Wootton High School in Rockville, Maryland in 2017. Following his high school graduation, he enrolled at the Karol Szymanowski Academy of Music in Katowice.

== Career ==
=== 2020–2021: The Voice of Poland and Ochman ===
In 2020, he auditioned for the eleventh season of The Voice of Poland with the song "Beneath Your Beautiful" by Labrinth and Emeli Sandé, getting chair turns from Michał Szpak and Edyta Górniak. He joined Michał Szpak's team and won the show on 5 December 2020. After the competition, he signed a contract with Universal Music Polska.

The Voice of Poland performances
Round	Song	Original artist(s)	Notes
Blind auditions	"Beneath Your Beautiful"	Labrinth & Emeli Sandé	Two-chair turn, joined Team Michał
Battle	"Lovely"	Billie Eilish & Khalid	Won against Weronika Szymańska
Knockout	"Z Tobą chcę oglądać świat"	Zbigniew Wodecki & Zdzisława Sośnicka	
Live shows	"All by Myself"	Eric Carmen	
Quarter-final	"Tylko poproś mnie do tańca"	Anna Jantar	
Semi-final	"The Sound of Silence"	Simon & Garfunkel	
Final	"My Way"	Frank Sinatra	Duet with Michał Szpak
Final	"Frozen"	Madonna	
Final	"Nie czekaj mnie w Argentynie"	Zdzisława Sośnicka	
Final	"Światłocienie"	Ochman	

His first single, "Światłocienie", was performed on The Voice of Poland in late 2020. The song was certified gold in Poland on 7 April 2021. He released his self-titled debut studio album, Ochman, on 19 November 2021. The album peaked at number 5 on Poland's charts on 3 March 2022.

=== 2022–present: Eurovision Song Contest ===
In early 2022, Telewizja Polska (TVP) announced that he would compete in Poland's national final, Tu bije serce Europy! Wybieramy hit na Eurowizję, with the song "River". The song was written by Ochman himself along with Ashley Hicklin, Adam Wiśniewski, and Mikołaj Trybulec. On 19 February 2022, he won the national final and represented Poland in the Eurovision Song Contest 2022 in Turin. He finished 12th in the final with 151 points.

On 27 January 2023, he released a single Cry For You in collaboration with Kalush Orchestra, the winner of the Eurovision Song Contest 2022.

== Personal life ==
Ochman is the grandson of the Polish tenor Wiesław Ochman.

He is a dual citizen of Poland and of the United States. He currently resides in both Katowice and Warsaw.

== Discography ==
=== Studio albums ===
List of studio albums, with selected chart positions and certifications
Title	Album details	Peak chart positions	Certifications
Title	Album details	POL	Certifications
Ochman	Released: 19 November 2021; Label: Universal Music Polska; Formats: CD, LP, digital download, streaming	5	ZPAV: Gold
Testament	Released: 17 November 2023; Label: Universal Music Polska; Formats: CD, digital download, streaming	14	
Klasycznie	Released: 22 November 2024; Label: Universal Music Polska; Formats: CD, digital download, streaming	8	

=== Compilation albums ===
List of compilation albums
Title	Album details
Trap/Urban	Released: 21 June 2024; Label: Universal Music Polska; Formats: Digital download, streaming
Klasyka/Pop	Released: 28 June 2024; Label: Universal Music Polska; Formats: Digital download, streaming

=== Extended plays ===
List of extended plays
Title	Extended play details
Ochman	Released: 12 May 2022; Label: Universal Music Polska; Formats: Digital download, streaming

=== Singles ===
List of singles as lead artist, with selected chart positions and certifications, showing year released and album name
Title	Year	Peak chart positions				Certifications	Album
Title	Year	POL	LTU	NLD Tip	SWE	Certifications	Album
"Światłocienie"	2020	—	—	—	—	ZPAV: Gold	Ochman
"Wielkie tytuły"	2021	—	—	—	—		Ochman
"Wspomnienie"	2021	—	—	—	—		Ochman
"Prometeusz"	2021	—	—	—	—		Ochman
"Ten sam ja"	2021	—	—	—	—		Ochman
"Złodzieje wyobraźni"	2021	—	—	—	—		Ochman
"River"	2022	12	34	26	88	ZPAV: Platinum	Ochman
"Bittersweet" (featuring Opał)	2022	—	—	—	—		Testament
"Cry for You" (featuring Kalush Orchestra)	2023	—	—	—	—		Testament
"Bronia" (with Jerry Heil)	2023	—	—	—	—		Testament
"8ball"	2023	—	—	—	—		Testament
"Rozmyty obraz"	2023	—	—	—	—		Testament
"Ona widzi nas"	2023	—	—	—	—		Testament
"Telefony"	2023	—	—	—	—		Testament
"Testament"	2023	—	—	—	—		Testament
"Mamo"	2024	—	—	—	—		Klasycznie
"Siłacz"	2024	—	—	—	—		Klasycznie
"Nie ma szans"	2024	—	—	—	—		Klasycznie
"Gdy nikt nie widzi"	2024	—	—	—	—		Klasycznie
"Nie widzą nic" (with TriKu and Gozdi)	2026	—	—	—	—		Non-album single
"Zostaw mnie dla siebie"	2026	—	—	—	—		TBA
"Czego ty chcesz"	2026	—	—	—	—		TBA
"Plastik"	2026	—	—	—	—		TBA
"Cisza ma imię"	2026	—	—	—	—		TBA
"—" denotes items which were not released in that country or failed to chart.

=== As featured artist ===
List of singles as featured artist, showing year released and album name
Title	Year	Album
"Energia" (Opał featuring Ochman)	2023	Przestrzeń
"Bestseller" (Wszystko dobrze featuring Ochman)	2023	Wszystko dobrze
"Pokolenie" (Sarius featuring Ochman)	2025	Projekcje

=== Promotional singles ===
List of promotional singles, showing year released and album name
Title	Year	Album
"Lights in the Dark"	2021	Ochman
"Christmas Vibes"	2021	Non-album single

== Awards and nominations ==
Year	Ceremony	Category	Work	Result
2021	Bestsellery Empiku 2021	Odkrycia Empiku 2021 – Muzyka (Empik Discoveries 2021 – Music)	Ochman	Nominated
2021	Wiktory Awards 2021	Odkrycie roku (Revelation of the Year)	Ochman	Won
2022	Fryderyki 2022	Album roku pop (Pop Album of the Year)	Ochman	Nominated
2022	Fryderyki 2022	Fonograficzny debiut roku (Phonographic Debut of the Year)	Ochman	Nominated

== See also ==
- Poland in the Eurovision Song Contest
- Music of Poland

Awards and achievements
Preceded by Alicja Szemplińska	The Voice of Poland winner 2020	Succeeded by Marta Burdynowicz
Preceded by Rafał with "The Ride"	Poland in the Eurovision Song Contest; 2022	Succeeded by Blanka with "Solo"
