= Wojtek Urbański =

Polish music producer

Wojtek Urbański Urbański
- Born: October 4, 1986 (age 39); Warsaw
- Genres: Electronic music, film music, ambient, glitch
- Occupation: composer
- Instruments: Keyboard instruments, percussion instruments
- Years active: 2007–present
- Publishers: U Know Me Records, Dyspensa Records
- Member of: Rysy
- Partner(s): Quebonafide, Mata, Bambi, Tymek, Brodka, Pezet, Julia Wieniawa, PRO8L3M, Jann, Kwiat Jabłoni, Justyna Święs

Wojciech Urbański (born October 4, 1986, in Warsaw) is a composer, music producer, and arranger. He won a Fryderyk Award in 2022 for the album “4GET” by the band Rysy. He is also a recipient of the Polish Soundtrack of the Year award at the 2022 Film Music Festival for his score to the film “Operation Hyacinth” (“Hiacynt”).

He has served as the musical director for numerous events, including the Empik Bestsellers Gala 2021, the concert “Together with Ukraine”, and the TVP Independence concert “Polska na TAK!”. Together with the group Dyspensa, he was responsible for the music production of Quebonafide’s concert “Act II | The Final Concert” at the National Stadium. He also composed music for the Silesian exhibition at the Polish Pavilion at EXPO in Dubai.

A film composer who regularly collaborates with Netflix, he has produced and arranged tracks such as “Ostatni – Rojst97” and “Oczko w głowie” by Tymek, as well as “Zabierz tę Miłość” by Julia Wieniawa and Maciej Musiałowski. He produced the albums “Mogło być nic” by Kwiat Jabłoni and “Odrodzenie” by Tymek.

He achieved his first international success in 2025 when he officially announced a collaboration with French influencer and pianist Emilio Piano. Their joint repertoire includes works created with French vocalist Lucie and Lebanese-French trumpeter Ibrahim Maalouf.

He has composed music for series such as “Women's Hell”, “Aniela”, “A Decent Man”, “Infamy”, “Ultraviolet” (dir. Jan Komasa), “Rysa”, and “Układ”, as well as for films including “The Altar Boys”, “King of Dope”, “Operation Hyacinth” (dir. Piotr Domalewski), “Lewandowski: Unknown”, and “Fanfic”.

He is a co-founder of the record label Dyspensa Records.

== Concerts with the band ==
=== Quebonafide “Act II | The Final Concert” ===
“Act II. The Final Concert” was a symbolic closing of a certain chapter. Quebonafide appeared on stage for the last time to summarize his artistic journey and bid farewell to his audience in grand style. It was a multimedia event with carefully crafted scenography and visual design, full of contrasts, extremes, and metaphors. Wojciech Urbański, together with the Dyspensa team, was responsible for the music production of the event, which gathered over 120,000 people at the National Stadium in Warsaw. Guest performers included Sobel, Mata, Oki, Kuban, Sokół, and Kukon.

=== TVP Independence Concert 2025 “Polska na TAK!” ===
An event organized and produced by Polish Television on the occasion of Poland's Independence Day. The concert was the culmination of a nationwide campaign by Polish Television and Polish Radio. Wojciech Urbański and his team were responsible for selecting the repertoire, preparing new arrangements, and supervising the entire performance. The audience could hear songs that once defined generations, presented in a completely new symphonic-electronic format. Performers included Zalia, Kacperczyk, Igor Herbut, Grubson, and Wiktor Dyduła.

=== BBC Earth “Hear the Planet” 2024 ===
An event inspired by the premiere of the third installment of the BBC Earth series “Planet Earth”, aiming to connect human creativity with the beauty of nature. Through an artistic composition of visuals and sound, the audience experienced the closeness of wildlife and reflected on humanity's role in the surrounding world. Performers on stage with the Urbański Orchestra included Natalia Przybysz, Anita Lipnicka, and Błażej Król.

=== “Tribute to Krzysztof Krawczyk Urbański Orchestra and Guests” Tour – Męskie Granie 2022 ===
This tour, part of Męskie Granie 2022, was a musical tribute to the iconic Polish artist Krzysztof Krawczyk. Wojciech Urbański oversaw the musical direction of the project. Concerts took place in Katowice (July 8, 2022), Wrocław (July 22, 2022), and Żywiec (August 27, 2022). The project concluded with the release of the album “Tribute to Krzysztof Krawczyk. Urbański Orchestra and Guests” on CD and a special pink vinyl edition.

=== OFF Camera 2022 ===
During the closing gala of the Mastercard OFF Camera Festival (May 7, 2022), Wojciech Urbański and his band paid musical tribute to the outstanding Polish composer Andrzej Korzyński, who passed away on April 18, 2022. The musicians performed his most popular works and film themes.

=== “Together with Ukraine” Concert ===
The charity concert “Together with Ukraine” took place on March 20, 2022, at Atlas Arena in Łódź. All proceeds from ticket sales were donated to the Polish Humanitarian Action, supporting aid efforts in Ukraine. The event featured well-known Polish and Ukrainian artists and was broadcast on TVN and in dozens of countries worldwide. Wojciech Urbański served as the musical director, preparing new arrangements of both contemporary pieces and songs significant in Polish and Ukrainian musical history.

Prominent Polish actors also took part, including Maja Komorowska, Danuta Stenka, Vanessa Aleksander, and Andrzej Seweryn, complementing the musical performances. The concert was hosted by Alina Makarczuk and Marcin Prokop and carried out in cooperation with the Polish Theatre in Warsaw. All participating artists waived their fees.

=== Empik Bestsellers 2021 ===
The Empik Bestsellers 2021 gala took place on February 15, 2022. Wojciech Urbański served as the musical director, creating new interpretations and remixes of well-known songs. He invited popular Polish artists and paired them into intergenerational duets. The event was hosted by Marcin Prokop.

== Awards and distinctions ==
Year	Competition	Category	For	Result
2026	Grand Prix Komeda 2026	Best Music in a Polish Feature Film	Music for the film “Ministranci”	Nomination
2026	Eagles 2026 (Orły)	Best Music	Music for the film “Ministranci”	Nomination
2024	Film Music Festival 2024	Polish Soundtrack of the Year 2023	Music for the series “Infamia”	Nomination
2024	Munoludy 2023	Electronic DJ of the Year (Poland)	Rysy	2nd place
2022	Film Music Festival 2022	Polish Soundtrack of the Year 2021	Music for the film “Hiacynt”	Won
2022	Fryderyk Awards 2022	Electronic Album of the Year	Rysy – “4GET”	Won
2022	Berlin Music Video Awards 2022	Best Narrative	Music video for “Kilo”	Nomination
2021	Munoludy 2021	Band of the Year (Poland)	—	Won
2021	Munoludy 2021	Song of the Year (Poland)	Rysy – “4GET”	Won
2019	Fryderyk Awards 2019	Film and Illustrative Music	“Ultraviolet OST”	Nomination
2017	Berlin Music Video Awards 2017	—	Music video for “Father”	Nomination
2016	Fryderyk Awards 2016	Phonographic Debut of the Year	Rysy	Nomination
2016	Nocne Marki 2015	Band of the Year	Rysy	Won
2016	Munoludy 2015	Discovery of the Year	Rysy	Won

== Discography ==
=== Studio albums / Main albums ===
Year	Title	Artist	Label	Highest position on OLiS chart	Sales	Certification
2026	Ministranci OST (Original Motion Picture Soundtrack)	Wojciech Urbański, Józef Rusinowski	Dyspensa Records	–	–	–
2026	Król Dopalaczy (Original Motion Picture Soundtrack)	Wojciech Urbański, Łukasz Palkiewicz	Dyspensa Records	–	–	–
2025	Aniela (Netflix Series Soundtrack)	Wojciech Urbański, Łukasz Palkiewicz	Netflix Music	–	–	–
2023	Infamia (Netflix Series Music)	Zofia Jastrzębska, Wojciech Urbański	Netflix Music	–	–	–
2023	Fanfic OST	Wojciech Urbański	Dyspensa Records	–	–	–
2023	Everdome (Original Metaverse Soundtrack)	Wojciech Urbański	Dyspensa Records	–	–	–
2022	Tribute to Krzysztof Krawczyk	Urbański Orchestra	Sony Music Poland	6	–	–
2022	Odrodzenie	Tymek, Urbanski	Kayax	19	–	–
2021	4GET	Rysy	Dyspensa Records	–	–	–
2021	Rysa OST	Wojciech Urbański	U Know Me Records	–	–	–
2018	Ultraviolet OST	Wojciech Urbański	U Know Me Records	–	–	–
2017	Selected Works	Urbanski	U Know Me Records	–	–	–
2015	Traveler	Rysy	U Know Me Records	–	–	–
2007	EP Violet Violin	Urbanski	Compost Records	–	–	–

Selected singles as producer and co-composer

Year	Title	Artist
2026	Let it be	Bambi
2025	Cascades	Emilio Piano, Ibrahim Maalouf
2025	Maison	Emilio Piano, Lucie
2024	List (Rojst Millenium | Netflix)	Brodka, Jann, Urbanski
2022	Jeden Świat	Pezet, Natalia Szroeder, Urbanski
2021	Ostatni (Rojst ’97| Netflix)	Tymek, Brodka, Urbanski
2021	Zabierz tę miłość	Maciej Musiałowski, Julia Wieniawa
2021	Sophia Loren	Tymek
2020	Oczko w głowie	Tymek, Kuba Karaś, Urbanski
2020	SMRC	Julia Wieniawa, Urbanski
2018	Nie muszę	Julia Wieniawa
2017	Ultraviolet	Urbanski, Justyna Święs

== Filmography ==
Year	Title	Production	Notes
2026	Women's Hell	Extreme Emotions	—
2026	Król Dopalaczy	Król Dopalaczy Film	Collaboration with Łukasz Palkiewicz
2025	Ministranci	Aurum Film	—
2025	Aniela	Polish Film Institute	Collaboration with Łukasz Palkiewicz
2025	Porządny Człowiek	TVN Warner Bros. Discovery	Collaboration with Paweł Lucewicz
2024	Będziemy mieszkać razem	MTL Maxfilm / TVP	—
2023	Infamia	Watchout Studio	Hip-hop music in the series
2023	Jesteśmy idealni	Orphan Studio	—
2023	Fanfik	Orphan Studio	—
2023	Lewandowski Nieznany	Papaya Films	Collaboration with Łukasz Palkiewicz
2021	Hiacynt	Shipsboy	—
2021	Układ	Endemol Shine Polska	—
2021	Rysa	Endemol Shine Polska	—
2019	Ultraviolet 2.0	AXN / Opus Film	Collaboration with Michał Bąk
2017	Ultraviolet 1.0	AXN / Opus Film	—

== Theatre productions ==
Year	Venue	Title	Directed by	Notes
2026	National Old Theatre in Kraków	“Zamknij oczy Nel”	Piotr Domalewski	—
2021	Dramatic Theatre in Warsaw	“Pułapka”	Wojciech Urbański	—
2019	Wrocław Pantomime Theatre	“Where do we go from here”	Ewelina Marciniak	in collaboration with Stefan Wesołowski
2019	Wrocław Contemporary Theatre	“Magnolia”	Krzysztof Skonieczny	—
2019	Ateneum Theatre in Warsaw	“Łowca”	Wojciech Urbański	in collaboration with Michał Bąk
2018	Collegium Nobilium Theatre in Warsaw	“Iluzje”	Wojciech Urbański	—
2018	Rozrywka Theatre in Chorzów	“Stańczyk. Musical”	Ewelina Marciniak	—
2016	Wybrzeże Theatre in Gdańsk	“Mapa i Terytorium”	Ewelina Marciniak	in collaboration with Justyna Święs
2015	New Theatre in Poznań	“Versus”	Jędrzej Piaskowski	—
2015	Powszechny Theatre in Warsaw	“Księgi Jakubowe”	Ewelina Marciniak	in collaboration with Barbara Derlak
