= Jann (singer) =

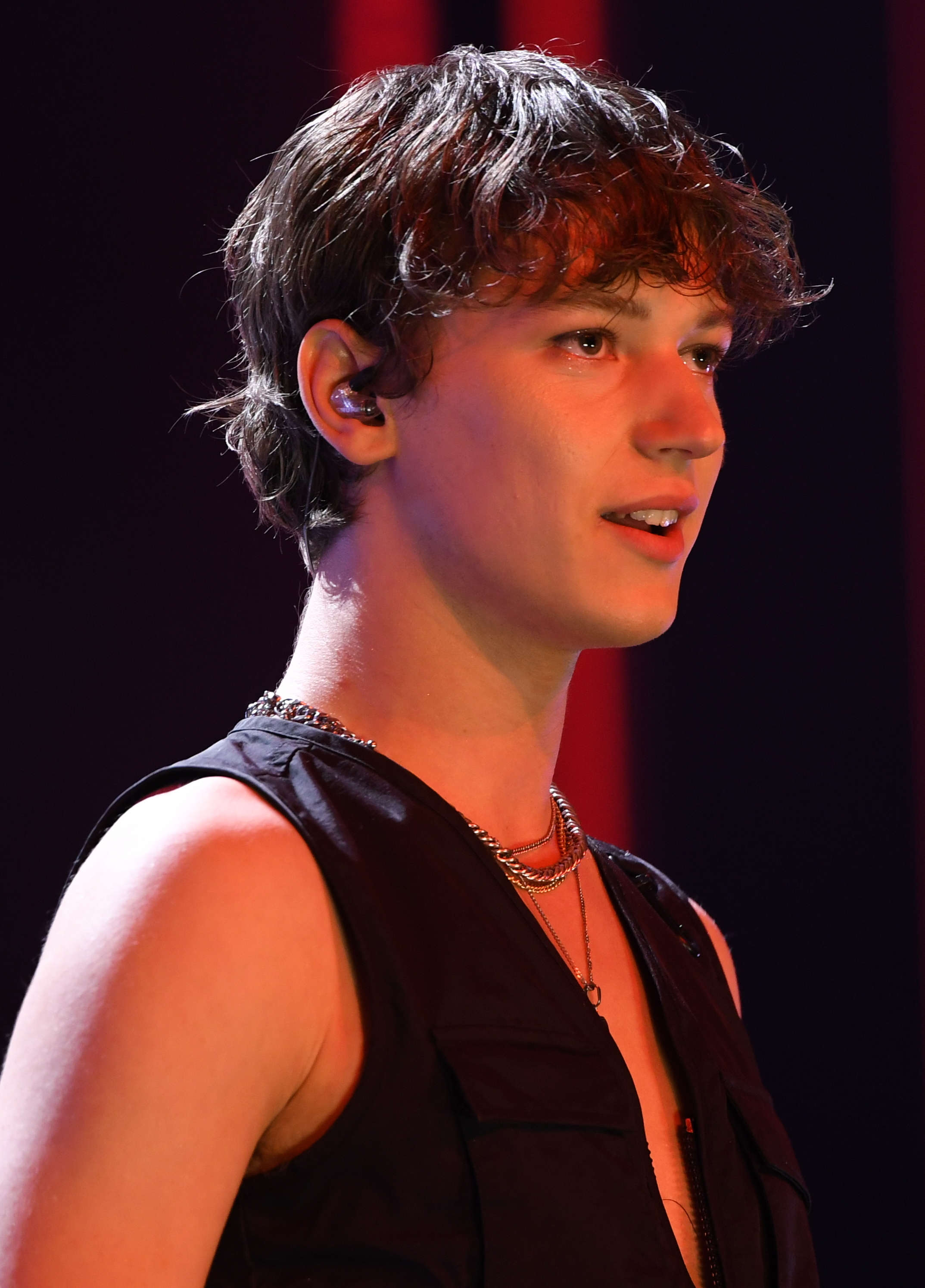
- Jann in 2023
- Born: Jan Rozmanowski; 12 February 1999 (age 27); Lublin, Poland
- Other name: Jann
- Occupations: Singer; Songwriter; Model
- Musical career
- Genres: Indie; Pop; Alternative
- Instruments: Vocals; piano; guitar
- Years active: 2020–present
- Label: Fonobo

Jan Rozmanowski (born 12 February 1999), known professionally as Jann, is a Polish singer and songwriter.

== Early life ==
Rozmanowski was born in Lublin to Edyta and Jacek Rozmanowski. He grew up in Garwolin, and is the fourth of eight siblings, with two older sisters Antonina and Amelia, older brother Maciej, two younger brothers Franciszek and Maksymilian and younger sisters Zuzanna and Lena. In 2013, the family participated in the first season of Polsat's reality television show Nasz nowy dom.

At the age of 12, Rozmanowski was cast in the opera King Roger at the Grand Theatre in Warsaw. The experience inspired him to pursue musical training at the Garwolin Music School, which he attended for three years and left at 16 when his family decided to move to Lurgan in Northern Ireland. After the move, he continued his education at St Colman's College, while also attending Flynn Performing Arts where he continued to study music. In 2018, he enrolled at the British and Irish Modern Music Institute in London, but dropped out to pursue music professionally.

== Career ==
=== Early career ===
In November 2020, Jann released his debut single "Do You Wanna Come Over?". His debut extended play (EP) titled Power followed in 2022. His hit single,"Gladiator", was released on 14 October 2022. Jann also served as the opening act during Ralph Kaminski's Bal u Rafała tour between 2022 and 2023.

=== Polish National Finals and Breakthrough ===
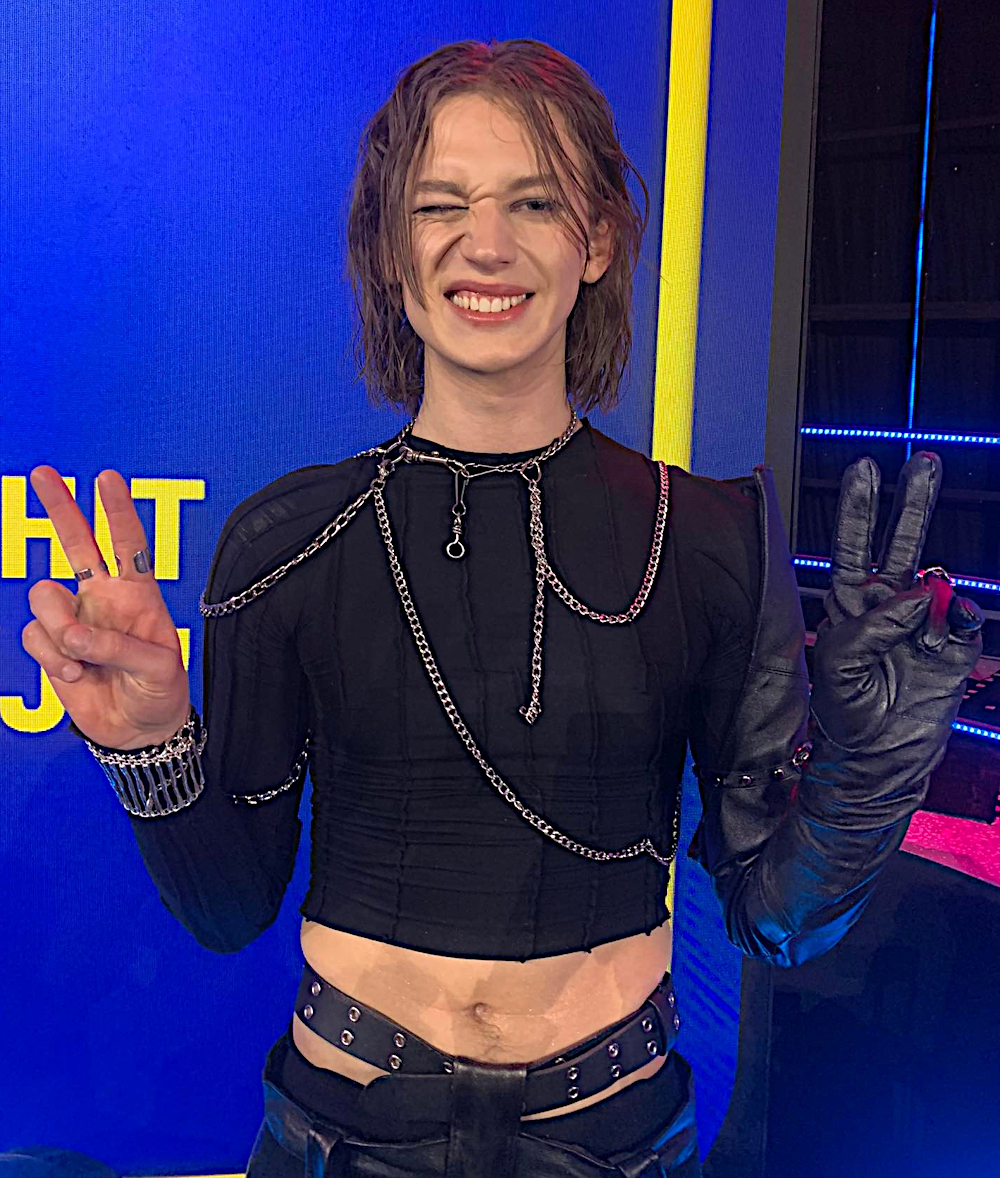
Jann in 2023, after competing in Tu bije serce Europy

On 26 February 2023 Jann participated in the final of Tu bije serce Europy! Wybieramy hit na Eurowizję!, the Polish national selection for the Eurovision Song Contest 2023 with Gladiator. He went on to claim second place, totaling at 19 points in the final, despite receiving maximum points in public televoting. His performance received an overwhelmingly positive reception from onlookers, acquiring him a large amount of national recognition. Throughout the jury voting sequence, where Jann received only 7 points despite being the overwhelming fan favorite to win, booing could be heard throughout the audience as results were announced.

Following the grand final, a post on TVP's official site regarding Blanka's victory was published at 03:30 PM, many hours before voting was processed and the winner was announced. After some time, the post was retracted and the timestamp was altered, but images and screenshots of the article can still be found online. This fueled a national controversy and sparked speculations among the contest's viewers that the results had been manipulated by the jury. Some viewers claimed that Blanka's performance was favored over Jann's due to her ties to the Polish jury. It was alleged that her and Allan Krupa, son of Edyta Górniak (chairman of the jury), knew each other personally, which Krupa later denied. The votes of jury member Agustin Egurrola were also questioned, as Blanka's dance troupe consisted of dancers from the Volt Dance Group, which is owned by Egurrola, leading to allegations of cronyism. Additionally, Blanka comes from rich family, leading to allegations of nepotism. The general consensus of the controversy was that Jann had intentionally been given fewer points by the judges to balance out his prominence of his public votes so that Blanka could represent Poland for Eurovision 2023. Dedicated fans created petitions to overturn the jury's decision and to allow Jann to participate in place of Blanka.

=== Post- Polish National Final ===
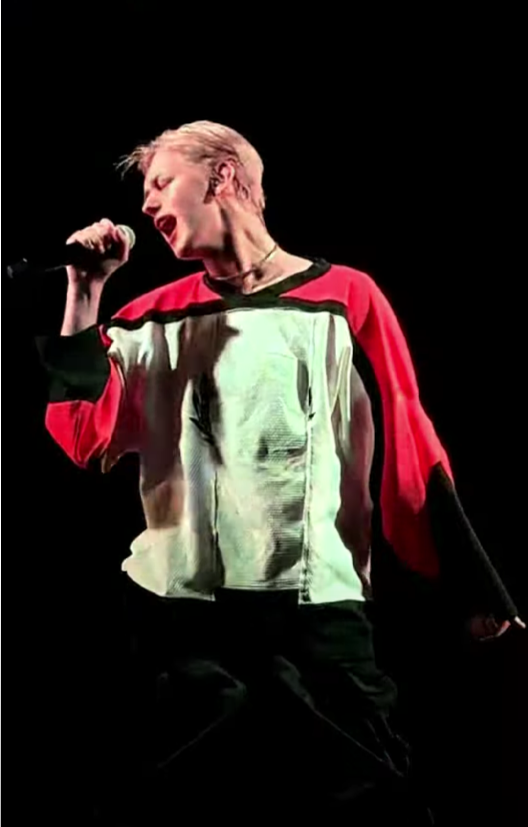
Jann in 2024, performing Charisma live

Following Gladiator becoming an overnight success, Jann announced his upcoming 'Gladiator Tour' in March 2023. He embarked on this tour in April 2023, hosting concerts in Warsaw, Poznań and Kraków among other cities, and his shows were met with a considerable amount of enthusiasm and positive reception. He went on tour again the following fall, and mainly toured in Poland. On 2 June 2023 he released his single "Need a break". Later that month, he co-headlined Orange Warsaw Festival, where he was also a surprise guest during Thirty Seconds to Mars's set.

Jann released the single "The Letter" in September, followed by the single "Charisma" the December of that year. He also announced international tour dates on Instagram in September for the "Jann_Tour International". He opened for Madison Beer during the European leg of her The Spinnin Tour alongside Jillian Rossi, between 25 February and 4 April 2024, and entered a paid partnership with Puma around the same time. He continued to receive international recognition through the concert itself as well as from social media. Following his opening shows, he partnered with Brodka to release another single the same year titled List which was used in the Netflix series Rojst Millenium. It was officially released on YouTube on 20 February 2024. He began his international tour late March the same year, performing shows all around Europe, notably in London, Dublin, Brussels, and Warsaw.

== Discography ==
=== Albums ===
Title	Details	Peak chart positions
Title	Details	POL
I Store My Fear and My Pain in the Nape of My Neck	Released: 11 October 2024; Label: Fonobo; Formats: CD, digital download, streaming, vinyl	9

=== EPs ===
Title	Details
Power	Released: 25 March 2022; Label: Fonobo; Formats: CD, digital download, streaming
Made	Released: 13 June 2025; Label: Fonobo; Formats: CD, digital download, streaming

=== Singles ===
Title	Year	Peak chart positions			Certifications	Album
Title	Year	POL Stream.	POL Billb.	LTU	Certifications	Album
"Do You Wanna Come Over?"	2020	*	*	—		Non-album singles
"One Missed Call"	2021	*	*	—		Non-album singles
"Body Temperature"	2021	*	*	—		Non-album singles
"Smile"	2022	*	*	—		Non-album singles
"Promise"	2022	*	—	—		Power
"Gladiator"	2022	2	2	13	ZPAV: Diamond	Non-album singles
"Need a Break"	2023	—	—	—		Non-album singles
"The Letter"	2023	—	—	—		I Store My Fear and My Pain in the Nape of My Neck
"Charisma"	2023	—	—	—		Non-album single
"List" (with Brodka and Urbanski)	2024	—	—	—		The Mire: Millenium
"What Do You Want From Me?"	2024	—	—	—		I Store My Fear and My Pain in the Nape of My Neck
"Arachnophobia"	2024	—	—	—		I Store My Fear and My Pain in the Nape of My Neck
"Listen to Me"	2025	—	—	—		Made
"Dywco (Demo)"	2025	—	—	—		Made
"Where Is That Boi"	2025	—	—	—		Made
"Haunted House"	2025	—	—	—		Made
"Burns"	2025	—	—	—		Made
"—" denotes items which were not released in that country or failed to chart. "*" denotes the chart did not exist at that time.
