= Jabłonna, Legionowo County =

Jabłonna
- Village
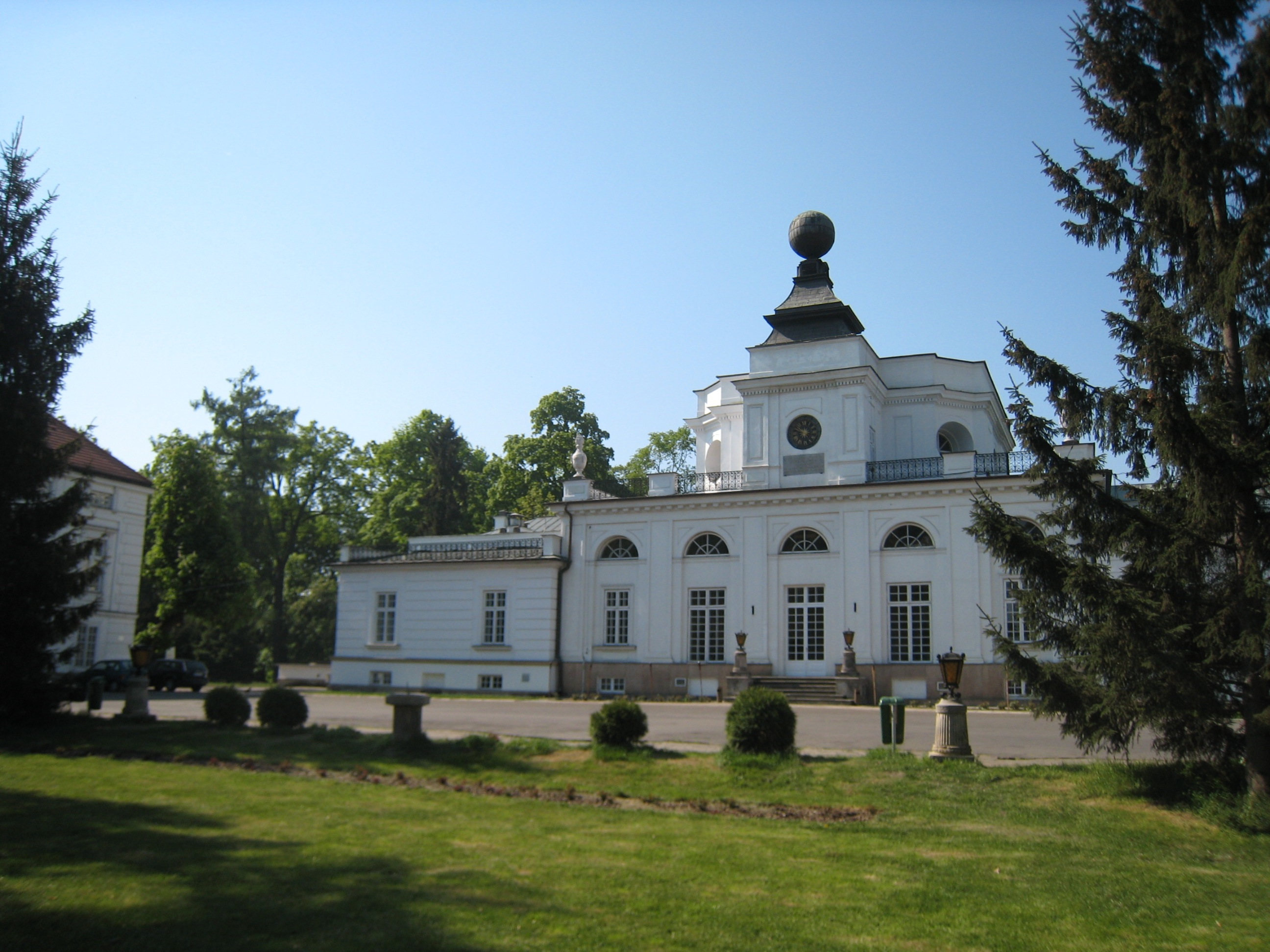
- The Jabłonna Palace

- Location within Poland
- Coordinates: 52°22′41″N 20°54′59″E
- Country: Poland
- Voivodeship: Masovian
- County: Legionowo
- Gmina: Jabłonna
- Area: 22.85 km^{2} (8.82 sq mi)
- Population: 7,365
- Postal code: 05-110
- Area code: +48 22
- Car plates: WL
- Website: http://www.jablonna.pl/

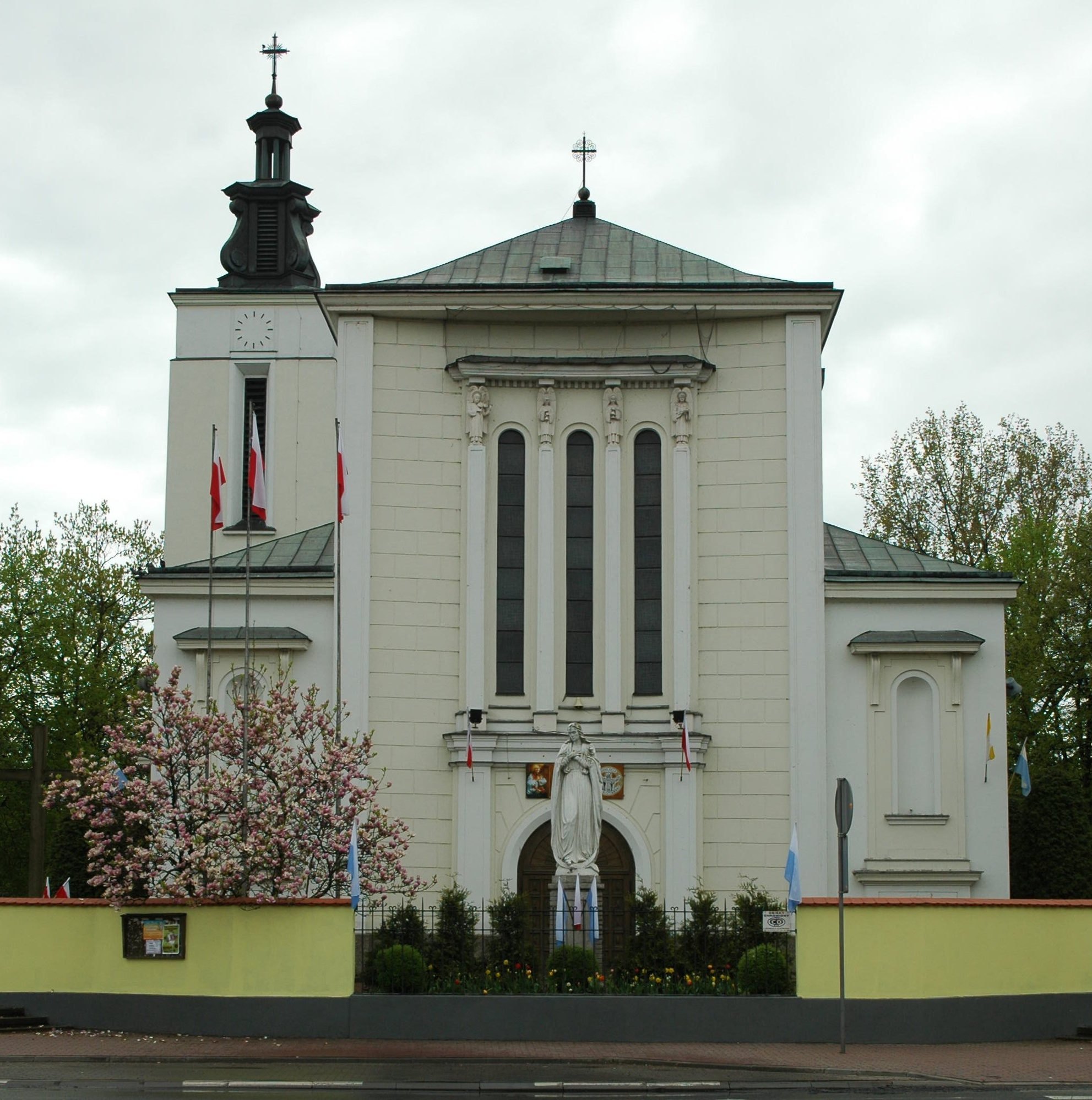
The Mother of God Queen of Poland Church

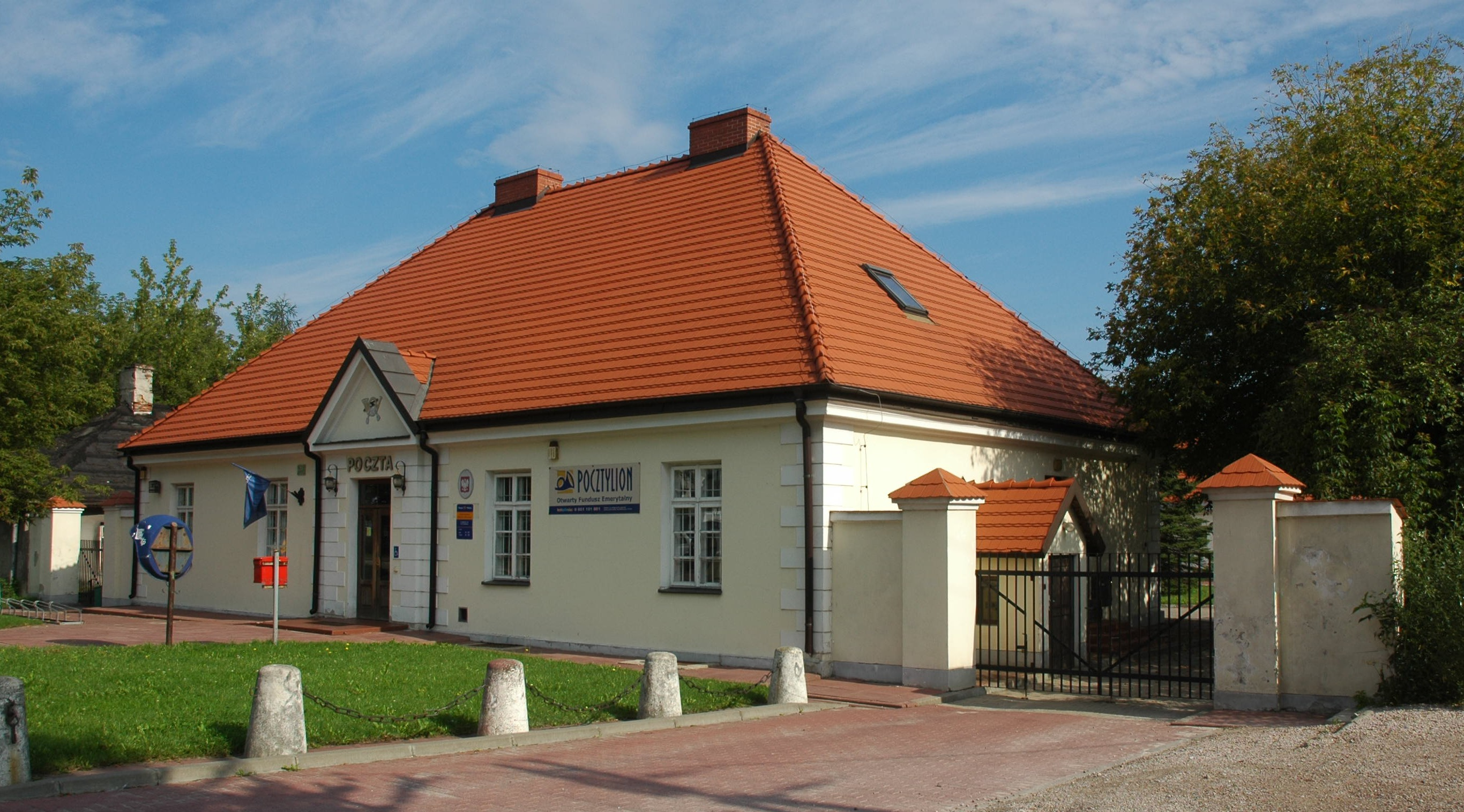
The old post office in Jabłonna

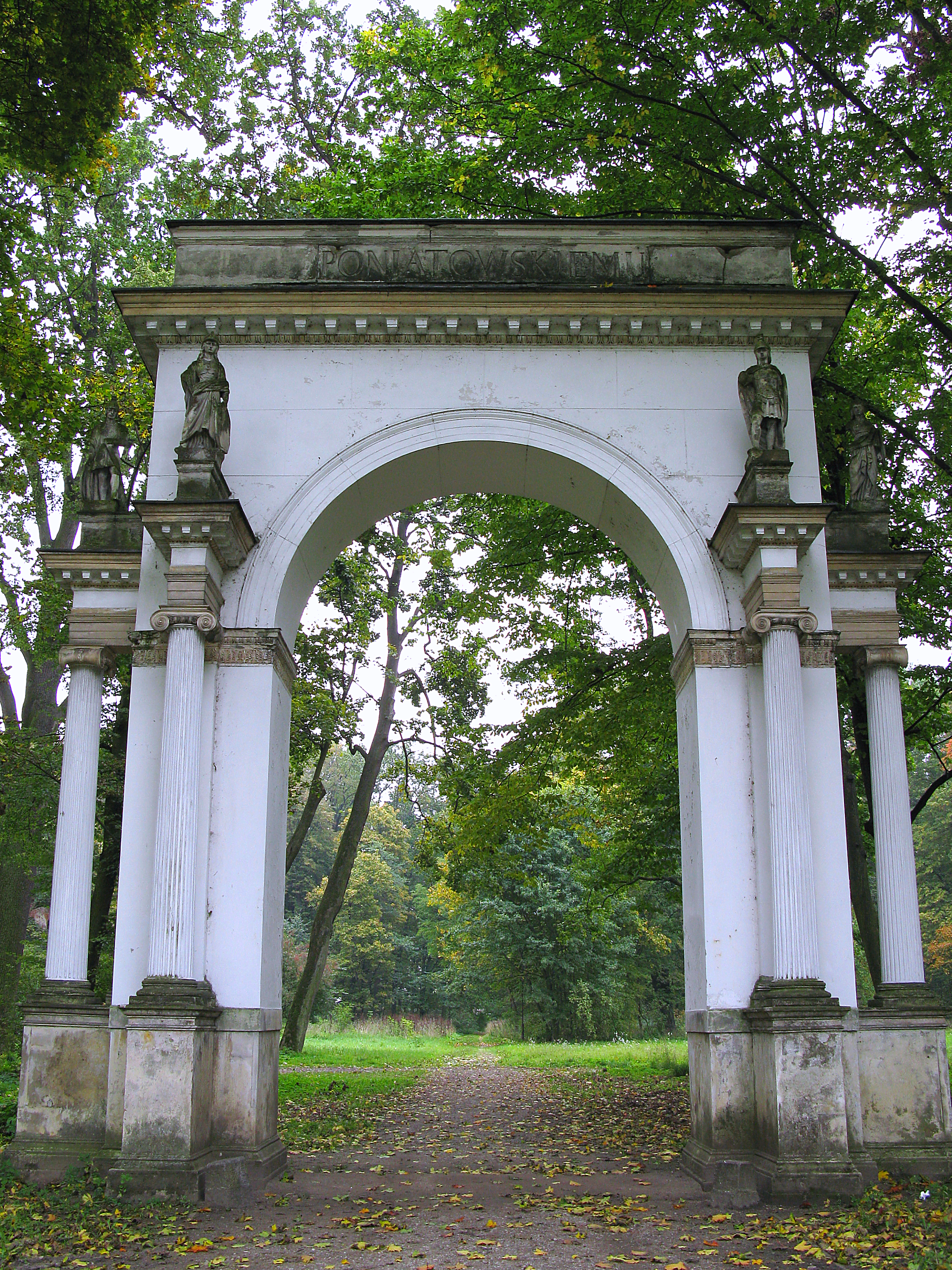
A triumphal arch built before 1842 in honor of Prince Józef Poniatowski, to a design by Enrico Marconi, in Jabłonna Palace's gardens

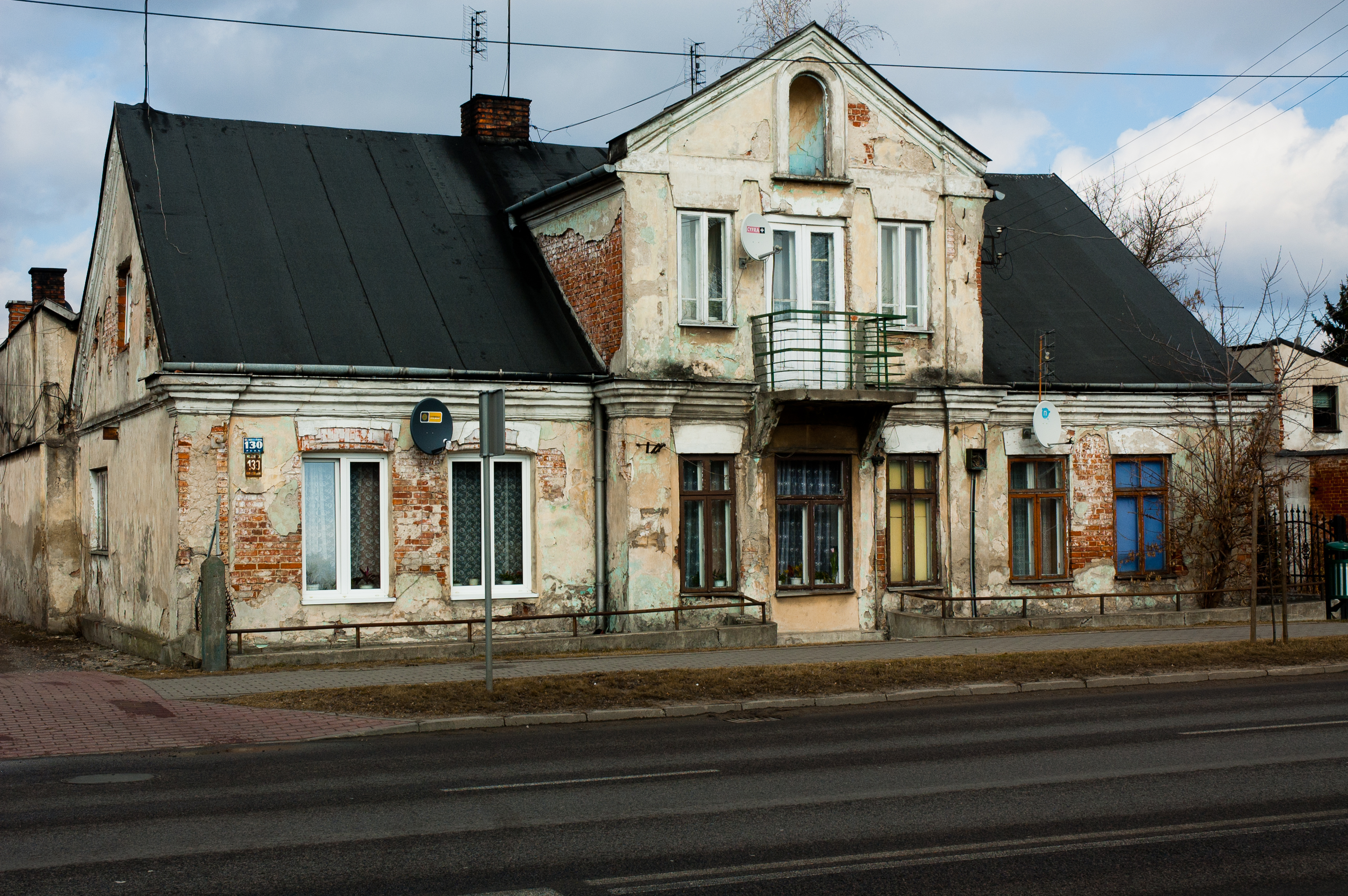
This building housed the Municipal Office of Jabłonna before the war, and after, a labor ward

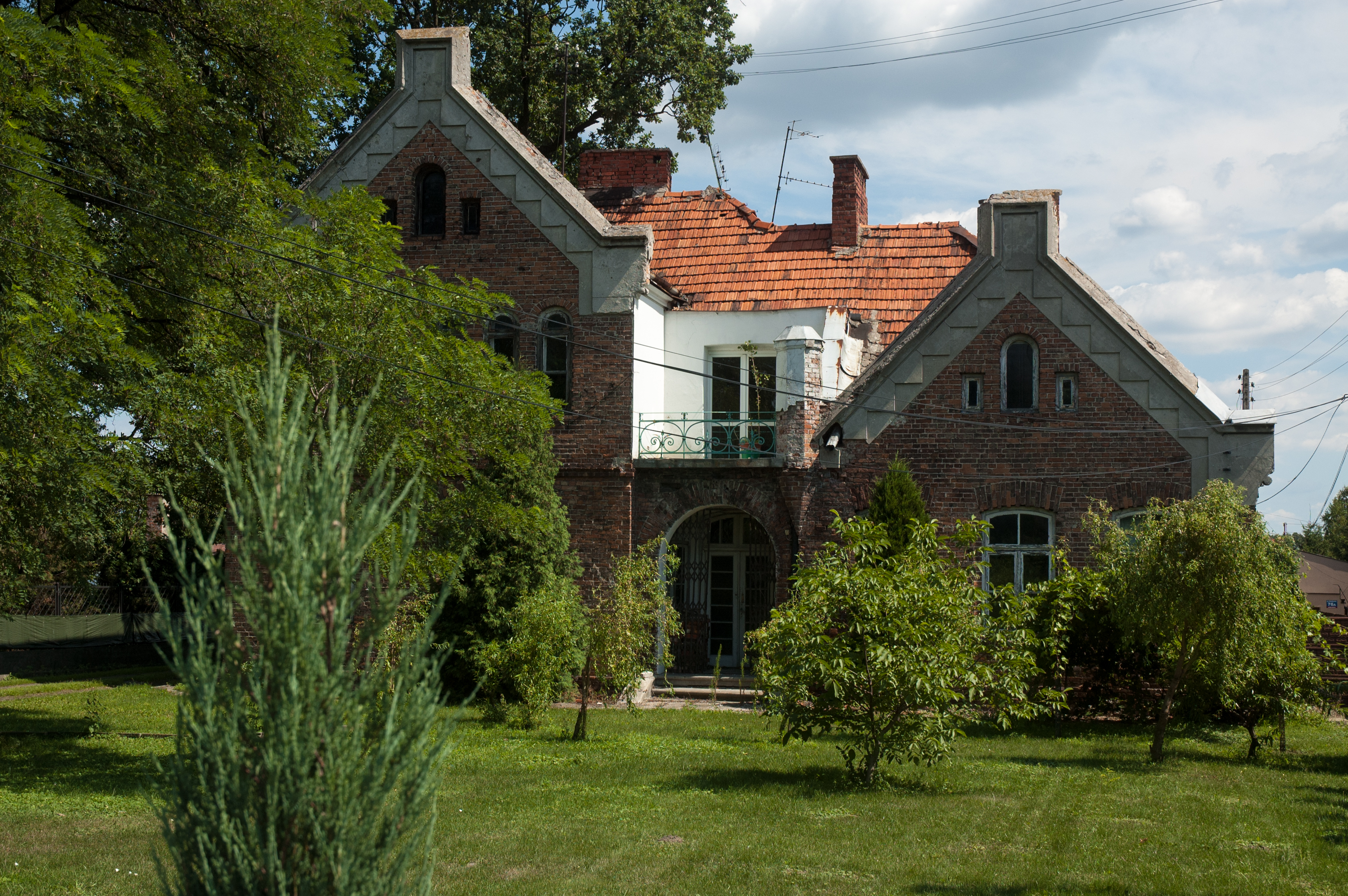
Stanisław Bzury's historic villa from the early 20th century

Jabłonna (Polish: [jaˈbwɔnna]) is a village in Legionowo County, Masovian Voivodeship, in east-central Poland, located north of Warsaw. It is the seat of the Gmina Jabłonna (administrative district).

The town has two major landmarks: the Jabłonna Palace (Polish: Pałac w Jabłonnie) and the Mother of God Queen of Poland Church (Polish: Kościele Matki Bożej Królowej Polski) which are situated in the center of the village.

== History ==
In 1920, during the Polish-Soviet War, some Jewish soldiers in the Polish military, distrusted by the military leadership, were separated from their units and imprisoned in a camp in Jabłonna for four weeks before being allowed to rejoin the military.

During World War II, from 1941 to 1943, Soviet POWs were held captive in nearby Bukowie (now within Warsaw) and Poniatów. On October 28, 1944, German troops were driven out by units of the Polish 1st Tadeusz Kościuszko Infantry Division after five days of fighting in the area of the village.

During the 1960s, 70s and 80s, the town became famous for the production of vegetables, fruit and flowers in greenhouse facilities, the largest in Poland at that time. It was also considered to be the richest town in Poland during that time.

From 1975 to 1998, the town was administratively part of Warsaw.

== Major buildings ==
=== The Mother of God Queen of Poland Church ===
In the centre of Jabłonna is the Mother of God Queen of Poland Church. It was built to the design of architect Joseph Sendyński on land donated by Count Maurycy Potocki from 1921 to 1925. In 1944, retreating German troops blew up the church, but it was rebuilt by architects Zbigniew Chwalibog and Bolesław Gierych from 1945 to 1954.

=== The Jabłonna Palace ===
Jabłonna Palace (Polish: Pałac w Jabłonnie) is a baroque palace built for Primate Michał Jerzy Poniatowski, the brother of King Stanisław August Poniatowski. It was built to a design by Domenico Merlini from 1775 to 1779, and later modified by Enrico Marconi in 1837.

The palace is surrounded by an English-style park, created in the 18th century by Szymon Bogumił Zug, which includes romantic buildings including a small Chinese house and a conservatory. According to legend, a tunnel exists that passes under the Vistula River leading to Bielany.

The palace interiors are richly decorated, including paintings by Szymon Mańkowski's and Antoni Tavellego and stucco by Italian Anotono Bianchi. From 5 to 7 September 1939, the palace housed the headquarters of the Modlin Army. The palace was burnt down in 1944 and rebuilt after the war.

Currently, it is a hotel and event centre owned by the Polish Academy of Sciences.

=== German fortifications ===
German fortifications (three concrete machine gun posts) were built during World War II at a bend in the Vistula River, about 1 km (1 mi) west of the palace's park. Their task was to guard a crossing of the Vistula. In September 1944, German soldiers from 6 SS Panzer Grenadier Regiment "Theodor Eicke" and the 3rd SS Panzer Division Totenkopf were based there. On 28 October 1944, the area was recaptured by the Polish 1st Tadeusz Kościuszko Infantry Division. To this day, the positions (in ruins close to the Vistula River) and clear traces of the trenches remain.

=== Post Office ===
The Potocki family leased land in 1837 for use by mail riders and a post office and outbuildings were built. Today, the building is still operated by the Polish post office.

=== Dr. Stanisław Bzury's villa ===
This is a historic brick villa from the early 20th century, located at 78 Modlińska Street. It initially belonged to Stanislaw Bzury, the municipal physician and expert viticulturist (who produced wine for Count Potocki).

A German commandant, in charge of troops guarding the river crossing to Warsaw, used it as his headquarters during World War II.

== Education ==
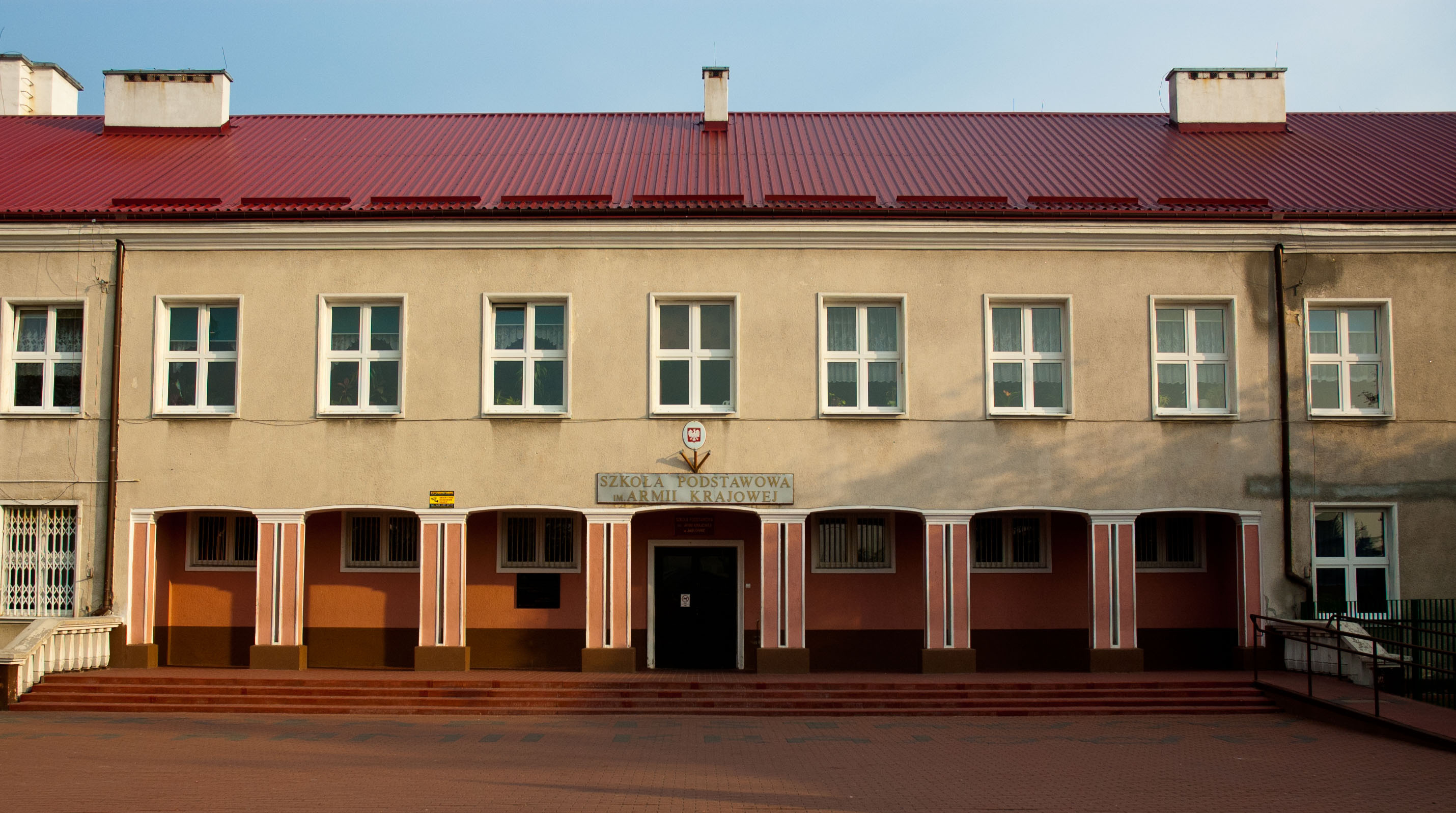
The Armii Krajowej Primary School

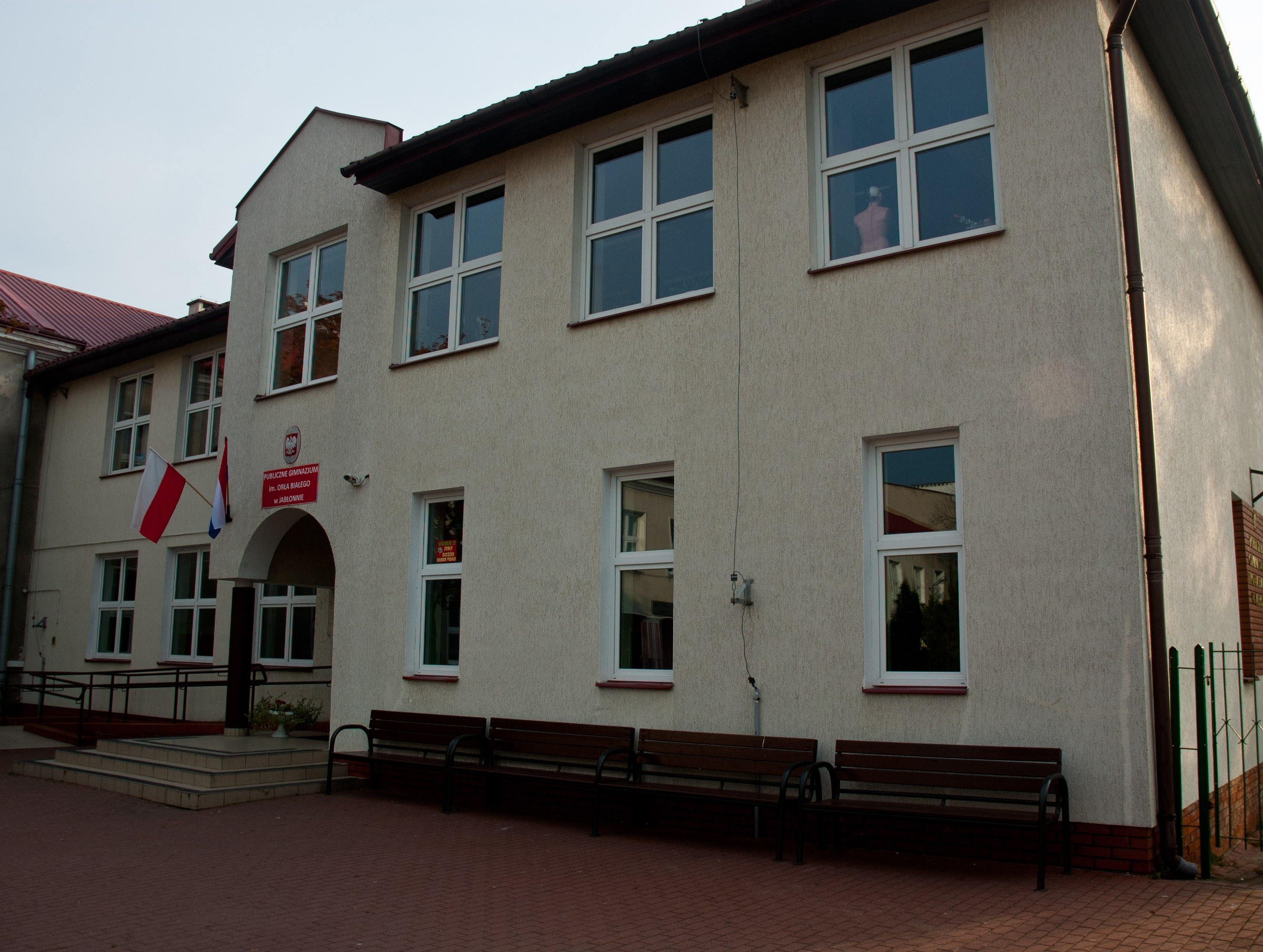
The White Eagle Gymnasium

=== The Armii Krajowej Primary School ===
The first elementary school in Jabłonna was located close to the present day Miła Street. Classes were held from the 1860s. The school was small and taught by a single teacher.

A few years after Poland regained its independence there was school in the highest category with a full curriculum taught by 8 teachers and classes were also conducted in private homes.

In the early 1930s, a wooden school building was erected in Szkolnej (School) Street with 5 classrooms. The building was partially destroyed at the end of World War II but was rebuilt and teaching resumed.

The continuous increase in the number of students meant that a new building was constructed from 1949 to 1955. The school had 11 classrooms, 14 auxiliary chambers, central heating, running water and sewerage.

On 9 November 1996, the school was named in honour of the Armia Krajowa.

=== The White Eagle Gymnasium ===
The White Eagle Gymnasium has 15 classrooms available and 2 language labs. In the computer lab, students have access to 14 computer stations with Internet access. It also has its own full-size sports hall.

== Voluntary Fire Brigade ==
A volunteer fire department was established in Jabłonna in April 1912. The first unit of firefighters was equipped with a manual pump, hoses, ladders, boat hooks, buckets, axes and hatchets. Equipment was stored in a wooden shed next to the building which is now the Municipal Office. The first fire truck was an Opel Blitz.

In 1995, the service was incorporated into the structure of the National Rescue and Fire Fighting System (which was set up to coordinate the activities of the national fire service and voluntary brigades). In 2012, it celebrated its 100th anniversary.
