= Ochman (album) =

Studio album by Ochman
- Released: 19 November 2021
- Genre: Pop; classical crossover; trip hop
- Length: 31:56
- Language: Polish; English
- Label: Universal
- Producer: @atutowy; Tomasz Kulik; Karol Serek; Paweł Wawrzeńczyk; Dominic Buczkowski-Wojtaszek; Patryk Kumór; Juliusz Kamil; Michał Pietrzak; Mikołaj Trybulec; Liker$

Ochman chronology
Ochman (2021)	Testament (2023)

Singles from Ochman
- 1. "Światłocienie" Released: 18 December 2020; 2. "Wielkie tytuły" Released: 25 February 2021; 3. "Wspomnienie" Released: 13 May 2021; 4. "Prometeusz" Released: 2 July 2021; 5. "Ten sam ja" Released: 5 August 2021; 6. "Złodzieje wyobraźni" Released: 29 October 2021; 7. "River" Released: 3 February 2022

Ochman is the debut studio album by Polish-American singer Ochman. It was released by Universal Music Polska on 19 November 2021.

Ochman is a combination of pop, classical crossover and trip hop. The album was produced by @atutowy, Tomasz Kulik, Karol Serek, Paweł Wawrzeńczyk, Dominic Buczkowski-Wojtaszek, Patryk Kumór, Juliusz Kamil, Michał Pietrzak, Mikołaj Trybulec and Liker$.

It peaked at number five on the Polish albums chart and has been certified gold.

== Track listing ==
Standard edition
No.	Title	Writer(s)	Producer(s)	Length
1.	"Światłocienie"	Krystian Ochman; Adam Wiśniewski; Tomasz Kulik	@atutowy; Tomasz Kulik	2:48
2.	"Wielkie tytuły"	Ochman; Wiśniewski; Kulik	@atutowy	3:14
3.	"Złodzieje wyobraźni"	Ochman; Karol Serek; Paweł Wawrzeńczyk	Serek; Wawrzeńczyk	3:15
4.	"Ja to znam" (featuring Avi)	Ochman; Wiśniewski; Kulik; Kamil Zalewski	@atutowy	2:41
5.	"Wspomnienie"	Ochman; Wiśniewski; Kulik	@atutowy	3:24
6.	"Gdzie iść?"	Ochman; Dominic Buczkowski-Wojtaszek; Patryk Kumór	Buczkowski-Wojtaszek; Kumór	2:29
7.	"Pewnego dnia"	Ochman; Wiśniewski; Kulik	@atutowy	2:52
8.	"Prometeusz"	Ochman; Juliusz Kamil, Michał Pietrzak	Kamil; Pietrzak	2:29
9.	"Ten sam ja"	Ochman; Wiśniewski; Sebastian Morgoś	@atutowy	2:35
10.	"Nie chcę już czekać"	Ochman; Buczkowski-Wojtaszek; Kumór	Buczkowski-Wojtaszek; Kumór	3:23
11.	"Lights in the Dark"	Ochman; Wiśniewski; Kulik	@atutowy; Kulik	2:46
Total length:				31:56

Deluxe edition
No.	Title	Writer(s)	Producer(s)	Length
12.	"River"	Ochman; Wiśniewski; Mikołaj Trybulec; Ashley Hicklin	@atutowy; Trybulec	3:00
13.	"Storyline"	Ochman; Serek; Wawrzeńczyk	Liker$	2:29
14.	"Overthinking"	Ochman; Serek; Wawrzeńczyk	Liker$	2:27
Total length:				39:12

== Charts ==
=== Weekly charts ===
Chart performance for Ochman
Chart (2021–2022)	Peak position
Polish Albums (ZPAV)	5

=== Year-end charts ===
2022 year-end chart performance for Ochman
Chart (2022)	Position
Polish Albums (ZPAV)	63

== Certifications ==
Certifications and sales for Ochman
Region	Certification	Certified units/sales
Poland (ZPAV)	Gold	15,000^{‡}
^{‡} Sales+streaming figures based on certification alone.

== Release history ==
Release formats for Ochman
Region	Date	Format(s)	Edition(s)	Label(s)	Ref.
Various	19 November 2021	CD; digital download; streaming	Standard	Universal	
Various	13 May 2022	CD; digital download; streaming	Deluxe	Universal	
Various	18 June 2022	Vinyl	Standard	Universal	
