= Dominik Dudek =

Polish singer and songwriter (born 1993)

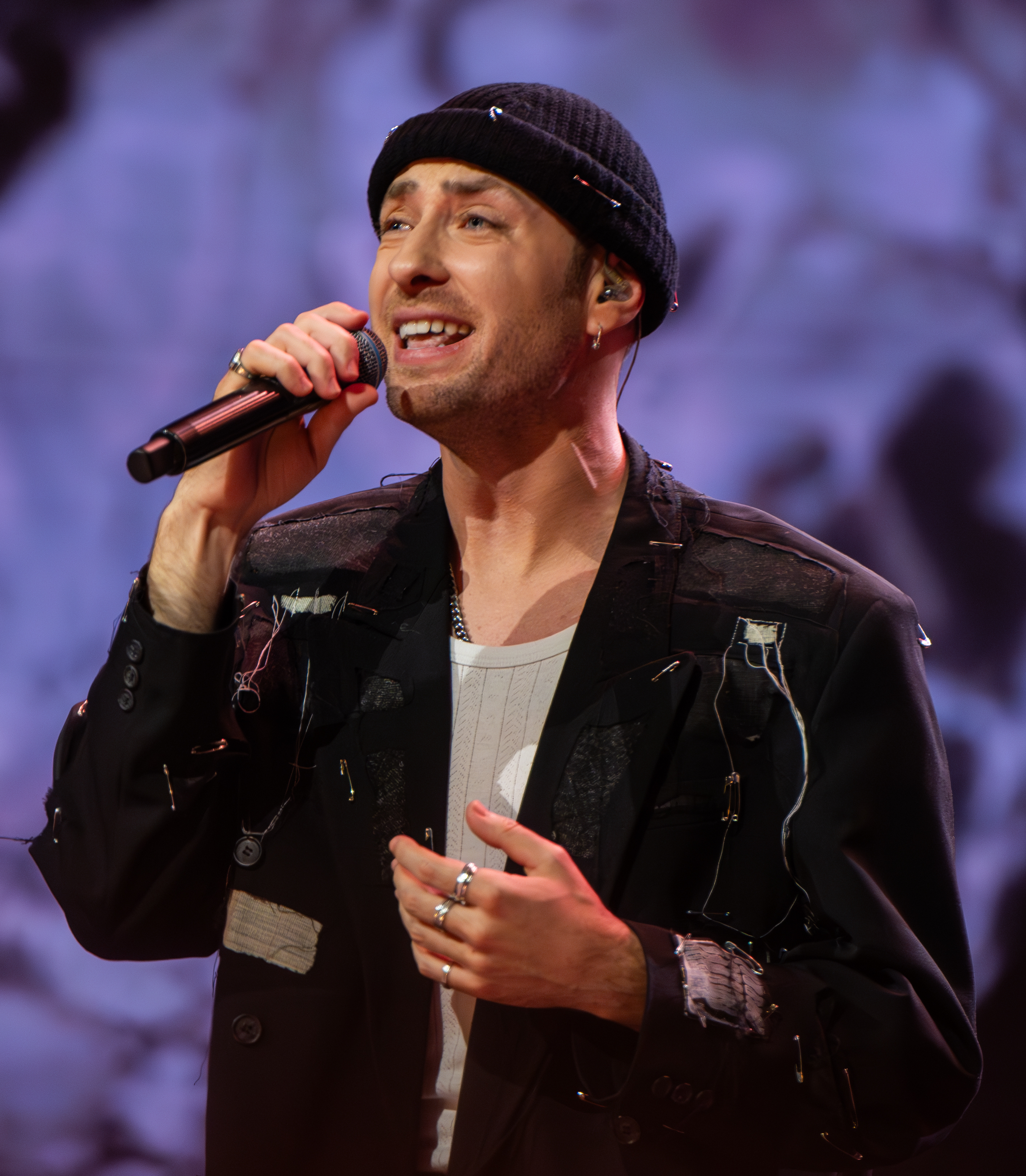
- Dudek in 2025
- Born: 7 September 1993 (age 32); Limanowa, Poland
- Citizenship: Polish
- Occupation: Musician

Dominik Dudek (born 7 September 1993) is a Polish singer-songwriter.

== Biography ==
Dudek was born on 7 September 1993 in Limanowa and grew up in the village of Młynne. He is the son of Marian Dudek. He graduated from a construction-oriented technikum and the Karol Szymanowski Academy of Music in Katowice, where he obtained a master's degree. After graduating from the academy, he settled in Kraków.

In late 2022, he won the thirteenth season of The Voice of Poland, which secured him a record deal with Universal Music Polska. In February 2023, he placed third in Tu bije serce Europy! Wybieramy hit na Eurowizję!, the Polish national final for the Eurovision Song Contest 2023, with the song "Be Good". In June 2023, he performed at the sixtieth National Festival of Polish Song in Opole, where his song "Idę" placed third in the Premieres category. In February 2025, he placed third in Wielki finał polskich kwalifikacji, the Polish national final for the Eurovision Song Contest 2025, with the song "Hold the Light".

== Discography ==
- Ja śnię (EP, 2023)
- We Are Young (But Only Once) (LP, 2025)
