= Jabłonna Palace =

Coordinates: 52°22′29″N 20°54′51″E

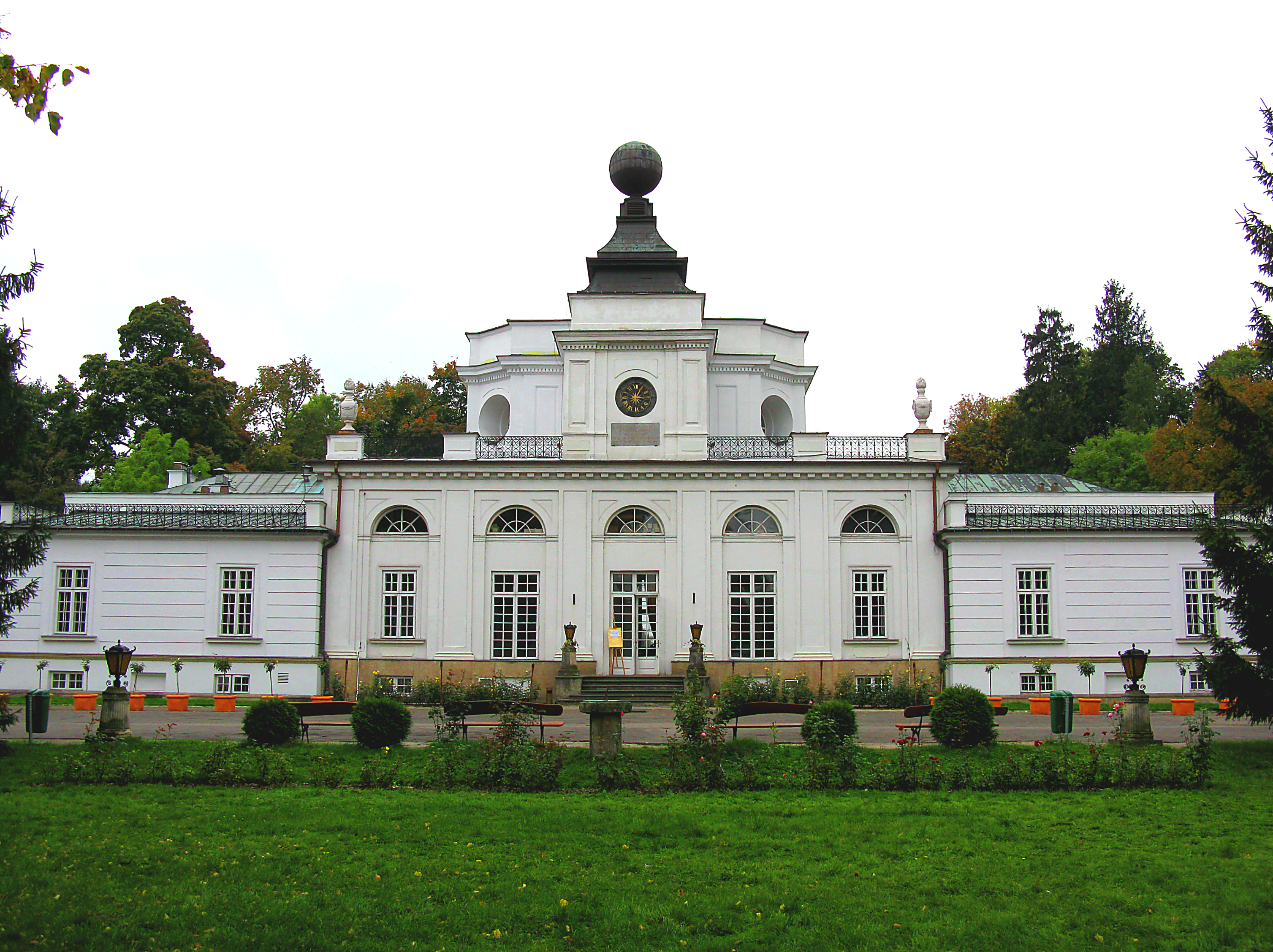
- The exterior of Jabłonna Palace.
- Interactive map of the Jabłonna Palace area

General information
- Architectural style: Neoclassical
- Location: Jabłonna, Poland
- Construction started: 1775
- Completed: 1779
- Client: Michał Jerzy Poniatowski

Design and construction
- Architect: Domenico Merlini

Jabłonna Palace (Polish: Pałac w Jabłonnie) is a palace, hotel and publicly accessible park-complex in Jabłonna near Warsaw in Poland whose uses include conferences and weddings.

== History ==
During the Middle Ages, Jabłonna was the property of the Bishops of Płock, who built a summer residence here in the 15th century. In 1773 the brother of the King Stanisław August - Michał Poniatowski, then Bishop of Płock and later the primate of Poland, bought the property in Jabłonna with the intention of turning it into an elegant palace-and-park residential complex. In 1774 he commissioned the royal architect, Dominik Merlini, to design the new residence. The construction of a three-building complex was proposed: a one-storey palace, which was intended to be the residence of the owner, was to be situated in the middle and flanked on both sides by separate three-storey pavilions.

The ballroom inside the Jablonna Palace

A scenic English-style park was developed in the 1770s and 1780s, based on the design of architect Szymon Bogumił Zug. The same architect also constructed a series of pavilions, of which three still remain today: the Grotto, the Orangerie and the Chinese Pavilion.

Originally, the central palace combined the austerity of the classical style with the baroque picturesqueness.

Over the next 40 years the buildings were extensively remodelled and added to, coinciding with a number of changes of ownership. In 1837 the palace was rebuilt according to the design of Henryk Marconi.

Jabłonna Palace was owned by the Potocki family until 1945. In 1944 the palace was burnt by the German army. Since 1953, Jabłonna has been owned by the Polish Academy of Sciences. Under its auspices the palace was transformed into the conference and recreational centre. The reconstruction of the palace was executed according to the design of Mieczysław Kuźma, and the reconstruction of the park according to the design of Gerard Ciołek. In the course of this renovation, the central part of the palace was restored to look as it did at the end of the 18th century, while its side parts, added in the first half of the 19th century, retained their original appearance. The furnishing and decoration of the palace interior was completed after 1945. The representative halls and chambers of the palace were decorated with old furniture and paintings from the end of the 18th and the first half of the 19th centuries.

== Current use ==
The palace is currently used as a convention center, training center and is often used for weddings and wedding receptions. It includes a ballroom, dining area and hotel rooms. Concerts, recitals, art exhibitions and scientific shows are held at the venue. The park is also open to the public.

=== Site of a Russian government-in-exile ===
In early November 2022, the palace has hosted Congress of People's Deputies of Russia, a Russian government in exile consisting of former deputies of the Federal Assembly of Russia in exile (such as Gennady Gudkov and Ilya Ponomarev), public figures (such as Andrey Illarionov), journalists, and several Ukrainian and Latvian politicians (such as Emanuelis Zingeris). The members of this Congress met, both in person and remotely, to discuss declarations in relation to the ongoing Russian invasion of Ukraine and further a post-Putin Russia.

== See also ==
- Architecture of Poland
- List of palaces in Poland
