= Blanka (Polish singer) =

Polish singer and model (born 1999)

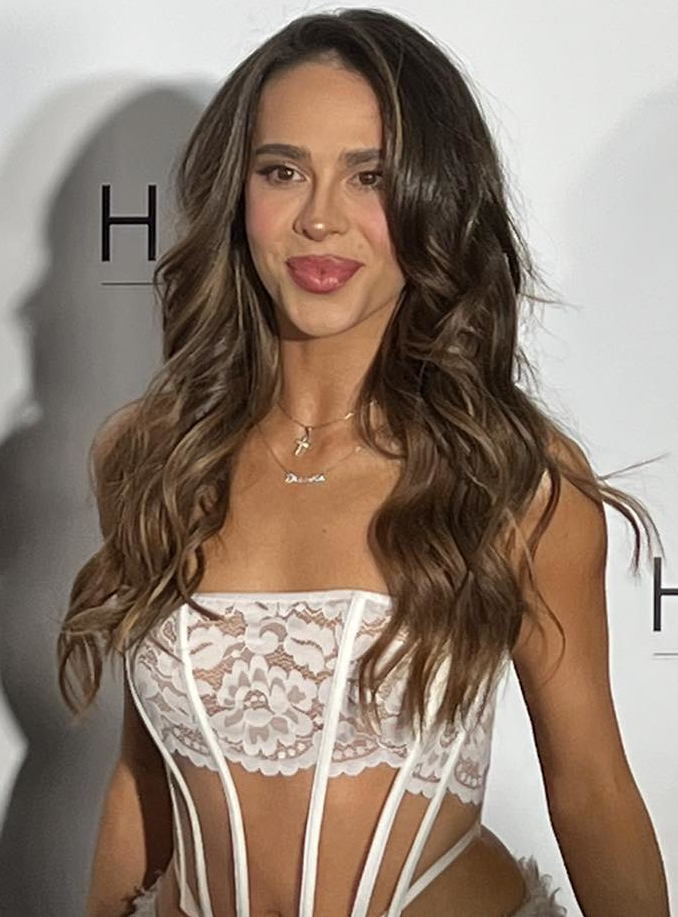
- Blanka in 2025
- Born: Blanka Stajkow; 23 May 1999 (age 27); Szczecin, Poland
- Occupations: Singer; model
- Years active: 2021–present
- Height: 167 cm (5 ft 5 1/2 in)
- Musical career
- Genres: Pop, Electro-Pop, Reggae, R&B
- Instruments: Vocals; guitar
- Label: Warner Music Poland

Blanka Stajkow (Polish pronunciation: [ˈblaŋ.ka ˈstajkɔf] Bulgarian: Бланка Стайков; born 23 May 1999), known mononymously as Blanka, is a Polish singer and model, with Bulgarian roots. She represented Poland in the Eurovision Song Contest 2023 with the song "Solo", finishing in 19th place.

== Life and career ==
=== Early life ===
Stajkow was born in Szczecin to Polish mother who is a former model and Bulgarian father who is a businessman. According to Stajkow, neither of her parents have a musical background. From an early age, she was encouraged by her mother to partake in various activities, including joining disco dance groups and attending music schools. She also said that in the mornings her mother would turn on either MTV or Trace Urban, which inspired her to pursue a career in the music industry.

At age 13, she produced and released her first song, "Strong Enough".

=== Top Model and Warner Music Poland (2021–2022) ===
In 2021, Stajkow participated in season 10 of the Polish reality television show Top Model, Poland's version of America's Next Top Model. While on the show, she released her first official single, "Better". The following year, she signed with Warner Music Poland, and released her second single, "Solo". She also appeared in the music video for the song "Pijemy za lepszy czas" by Smolasty, whom she dated at the time.

=== Eurovision Song Contest (2023) ===
On 15 February 2023, Blanka was announced as one of ten competitors of Tu bije serce Europy! Wybieramy hit na Eurowizję, the Polish national selection for the Eurovision Song Contest 2023 with "Solo". She won the contest, receiving maximum points from the jury and coming second in public voting. As a result, she became Poland's entrant in the Eurovision Song Contest 2023. Her victory in Tu bije serce Europy! Wybieramy hit na Eurowizję sparked controversy in Poland due to alleged rigged votes and corruption within the jury panel for the national selection.

At Eurovision, Blanka performed in the second semi final, placing third and advancing to the grand final. In the final, she finished 19th with 93 points. "Solo" charted across Europe, and was certified Diamond in Poland.

=== Post-Eurovision (2023–present) ===
Following her participation in Eurovision, Blanka released the singles: "Boys Like Toys" and "Rodeo" in 2023, and "Cara mia", "If U Want Me" and "Asereje (Airplane Mode)" in 2024. "Rodeo" reached number four in the Polish charts, while "Boys Like Toys", "Caria mia" and "If U Want Me" charted in the country's top 20. "Asereje (Airplane Mode)" was featured in season three of the HBO Max series The Sex Lives of College Girls. In February 2024, Blanka appeared in the music video for the Kolors's song "Un ragazzo una ragazza". In April 2024, she served as the opening act for the Polish date of Jason Derulo's worldwide Nu King World Tour.

In 2025, Blanka was a contestant on season 29 of the Polish version of the dancing show Dancing with the Stars. Together with her dancing partner Mieszko Masłowski, she finished fifth. In 2026, she debuted as a coach on the ninth season of Poland's The Voice Kids alongside Cleo and Tribbs.

== Discography ==
=== Singles ===
List of singles as lead artist, with selected chart positions and certifications, showing year released and album name
Title	Year	Peak chart positions										Certifications	Album
Title	Year	POL Air.	POL Stream.	POL Billb.	CZE Air.	FIN	ICE	IRE	LTU	UKR Air.	UK	Certifications	Album
"Better"	2021	—	*		—	—	—	—	—	—	—		Non-album singles
"Solo"	2022	4	1	3	12	24	11	85	1	166	56	ZPAV: 2× Diamond	Non-album singles
"Boys Like Toys"	2023	19	45	—	—	—	—	—	—	—	—	ZPAV: Gold	Non-album singles
"Rodeo"	2023	4	—	—	2	— (Note: "Rodeo" did not enter the Official Finnish Singles Chart, but peaked at number 5 on the Official Finnish Radio Chart.)	—	—	— (Note: "Rodeo" did not enter the AGATA Singlų Top 100, but peaked at No. 93 on the TopHit Lithuanian Airplay chart.)	—	—	ZPAV: Platinum	Non-album singles
"Cara mia"	2024	11	—	—	—	—	—	—	— (Note: "Cara mia" did not enter the AGATA Singlų Top 100, but peaked at No. 21 on the TopHit Lithuanian Airplay chart.)	—	—	ZPAV: Gold	Non-album singles
"If U Want Me"	2024	15	—	—	—	—	—	—	— (Note: "If U Want Me" did not enter the AGATA Singlų Top 100, but peaked at No. 178 on the TopHit Lithuanian Airplay chart.)	—	—		Non-album singles
"Asereje (Airplane Mode)"	2024	—	—	—	—	—	—	—	—	—	—		Non-album singles
"Key to My Heart"	2025	—	—	—	—	—	—	—	—	—	—		Non-album singles
"Guilty"	2025	21	—	—	—	—	—	—	— (Note: "Guilty" did not enter the AGATA Singlų Top 100, but peaked at No. 156 on the TopHit Lithuanian Airplay chart.)	10	—		Non-album singles
"Wracam" (with Malik Montana)	2025	—	23	—	—	—	—	—	—	—	—	ZPAV: Gold	Non-album singles
"Memories"	2026	—	—	—	—	—	—	—	—	—	—		Non-album singles
"I'm Just a Human"	2026	—	—	—	—	—	—	—	—	—	—		Non-album singles
"Niewinna" (with Skolim)	2026	—	96	—	—	—	—	—	—	—	—		96
"Dance to This"	2026	—	—	—	—	—	—	—	—	—	—		Non-album singles
"Yeyeyo"	2026	—	—	—	—	—	—	—	—	—	—		Non-album singles
"Sto lat!" (Boysband Bagiego featuring Blanka)	2026	—	—	—	—	—	—	—	—	—	—		Non-album singles
"Delete Me" (Jason Derulo featuring Lovixx and Blanka)	2026	—	—	—	—	—	—	—	—	—	—		Non-album singles
"—" denotes a single that did not chart or was not released in that territory. "*" denotes the chart did not exist at that time.

=== Promotional singles ===
List of promotional singles, showing year released and album name
Title	Year	Album
"All I Want for Christmas Is You"	2022	Non-album single

== Notes ==
Awards and achievements
Preceded by Ochman with "River"	Poland in the Eurovision Song Contest; 2023	Succeeded by Luna with "The Tower"
