= River (Krystian Ochman song) =

2022 single by Krystian Ochman

Single by Ochman

from the album Ochman (Deluxe Edition)
- Language: English
- Released: 3 February 2022
- Genre: Soul, orchestral pop
- Length: 3:00
- Label: Universal Music Polska
- Songwriters: Krystian Ochman; Ashley Hicklin; Adam Wiśniewski; Mikołaj Trybulec

Ochman singles chronology
"Złodzieje wyobraźni" (2021)	"River" (2022)	"Bittersweet" (2022)

Music video
- "River" on YouTube

Eurovision Song Contest 2022 entry
- Country: Poland
- Artist: Ochman
- Language: English
- Composers: Ochman; Ashley Hicklin; Adam Wiśniewski; Mikołaj Trybulec
- Lyricists: Ochman; Ashley Hicklin

Finals performance
- Semi-final result: 6th
- Semi-final points: 198
- Final result: 12th
- Final points: 151

Entry chronology
- ◄ "The Ride" (2021)
- "Solo" (2023) ►

"River" is a 2022 single by Polish-American singer Ochman. The song represented Poland in the Eurovision Song Contest 2022 in Turin, Italy after winning Tu bije serce Europy! Wybieramy hit na Eurowizję, Poland's national final.

== Background and composition ==
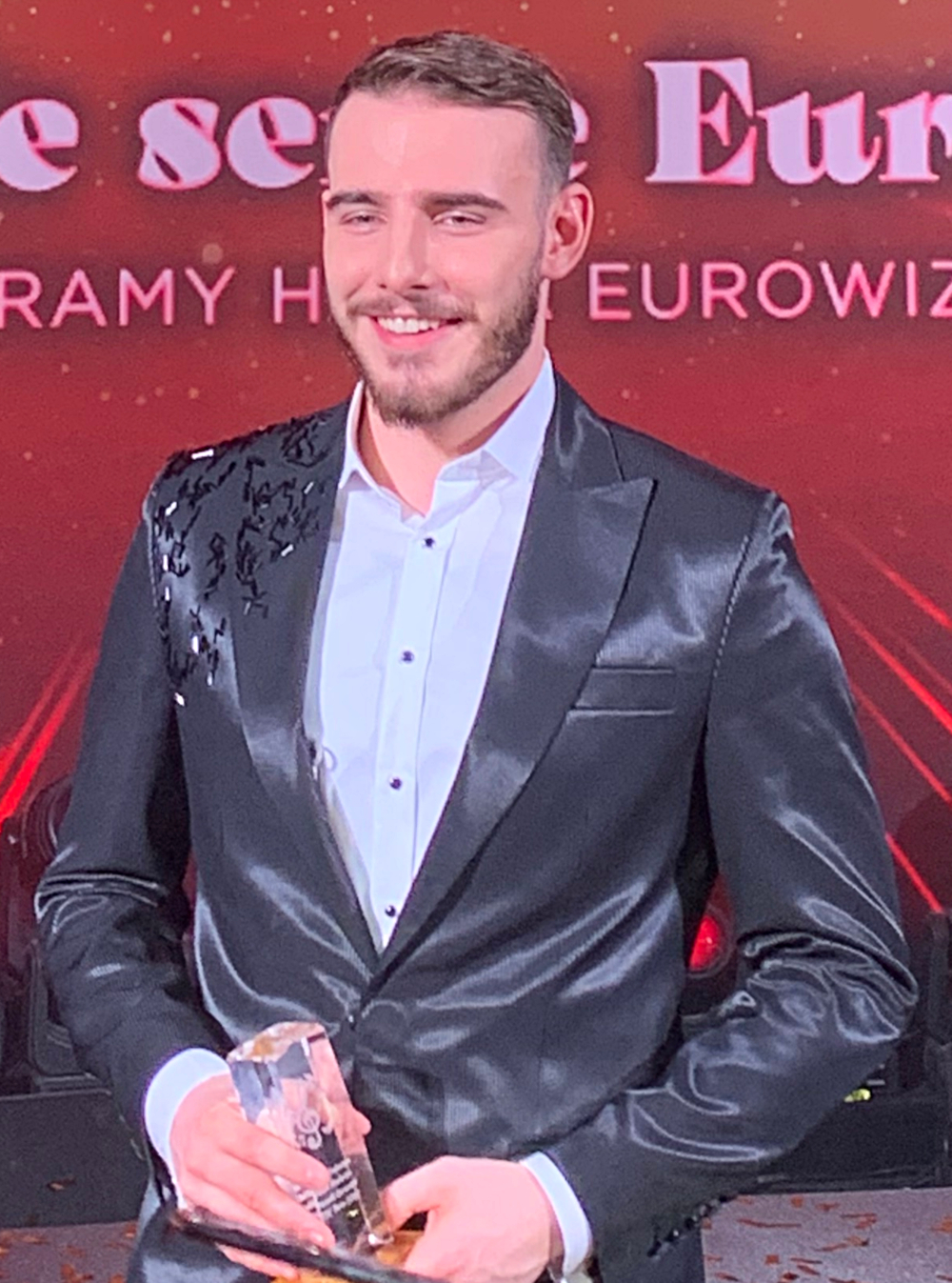
Ochman in Tu bije serce Europy! Wybieramy hit na Eurowizję on 19 February 2022

"River" was written by Krystian Ochman and Ashley Hicklin and produced by Adam Wiśniewski and Mikołaj Trybulec.

According to Ochman, the song tackles stress and the world constantly thinking about the future, adding that the song is "how much we want and need a break from all this hustle and bustle." Glamour Poland said that the song focuses on nostalgia, grief, and indifference. In the first verse, Ochman hints at "going to the river" to "carry him and let him drift away" as he has many tasks and "too much on his mind." Eventually, the lyrics argue that the worst moments will soon pass, like a flowing river. Rafał Wróblewski of ESKA says that the message is needed now: "when there is so much sadness, stress, and uncertainty around us." He added that, even though we still have to prepare for the future, we still have to "look for the positives," adding that time does not stop like a river, leading to problems being inevitable, and that there is still hope in a better life. Super Express said that the mouth of a river is meant to "symbolize a moment of respite and rebirth."

== Release and promotion ==
The song was released on February 3 with an accompanying music video directed by Dawid Ziemba and the Mind Productions team. Rafał Wróblewski of ESKA said that the music video had "many symbols, such as closing doors, dark figures circling next to the main character, or even an attempt to escape from the palace." Filming started at 08:00 CET and ended at 20:00 CET at the Jabłonna Palace.

== Reception ==
Netizens, according to site ESKA, praised the vocals, melody, and flowing message while Glamour Poland said that the song was a solemn ballad.

== Eurovision Song Contest ==
=== Tu bije serce Europy! Wybieramy hit na Eurowizję ===
TVP opened a submission period for interested artists and songwriters to submit their entries between 20 September 2021 and 20 November 2021. The broadcaster received 150 submissions at the closing of the deadline. A five-member selection committee consisting of a representative of TVP, a radio personality, a music expert, a journalist and a representative of the Polish Musicians Union selected ten entries from the received submissions to compete in the national final. The selected entries were announced on 14 January 2022 during the TVP2 programme Pytanie na śniadanie.

The final took place on February 19, 2022. Ten entries would compete, and the winner was determined over two rounds of voting. The top three most voted songs would proceed to the superfinal round, where all votes would be reset and the winner would be determined. Both rounds would use a 50/50 combination of votes from a professional jury and a public vote.

"River" would move on to be one of the three songs in the superfinal, which it won. As a result, the song represented Poland in the Eurovision Song Contest 2022.

=== At Eurovision ===
According to Eurovision rules, all nations with the exceptions of the host country and the "Big Five" (France, Germany, Italy, Spain and the United Kingdom) are required to qualify from one of two semi-finals in order to compete for the final; the top ten countries from each semi-final progress to the final. The European Broadcasting Union (EBU) split up the competing countries into six different pots based on voting patterns from previous contests, with countries with favourable voting histories put into the same pot. On 25 January 2022, an allocation draw was held which placed each country into one of the two semi-finals, as well as which half of the show they would perform in. Poland was placed into the second semi-final, held on 12 May 2022, and performed in the second half of the show, 14th out of 18th countries.

== Track listing ==
Digital download
No.	Title	Length
1.	"River"	3:00

CD single
No.	Title	Length
1.	"River"	2:59

== Charts ==
Chart performance for "River"
Chart (2022)	Peak position
Iceland (Tónlistinn)	24
Lithuania (AGATA)	34
Netherlands (Single Tip)	26
Poland Airplay (ZPAV)	12
Sweden (Sverigetopplistan)	88
UK Singles Downloads (Official Charts)	42

== Certifications ==
Certifications for "River"
Region	Certification	Certified units/sales
Poland (ZPAV)	Platinum	50,000^{‡}
^{‡} Sales+streaming figures based on certification alone.
