= Mówią Wieki =

Polish history magazine

- Mówią Wieki cover from July 2007
- Type: History magazine
- Owner: Bellona Publishing House
- Editor: Jarosław Krawczyk
- Founded: 1958; 68 years ago
- Headquarters: Warsaw
- Country: Poland
- ISSN: 1230-4018
- Website: mowiawieki.pl

Mówią Wieki (Polish pronunciation: [ˈmu.vjɔw̃ ˈvjɛ.ki], meaning Centuries Speak in English) is a monthly popular science and history magazine published in Poland since 1958.

== Editors in chief ==
- Maria Bogucka (1958–1976)
- Bożena Krzywobłocka (1976–1977)
- Eugeniusz Duraczyński (1977–1990)
- Stefan Meller (1990–1994)
- Jerzy Kochanowski (1995)
- Jarosław Krawczyk (1995–present)

== Contributors ==
Many Polish historians have published pieces in the magazine, including Tadeusz Manteuffel, Aleksander Gieysztor, Jerzy Holzer, Barbara Grochulska, Andrzej Garlicki, Ewa Wipszycka, Stefan Kieniewicz, Antoni Mączak, Andrzej Wyrobisz, Andrzej Zahorski, Benedykt Zientara, Janusz Tazbir, Henryk Samsonowicz, Bronisław Geremek, Karol Modzelewski.
