= Marceli Handelsman =

Polish historian (1882–1945)

Marceli Handelsman ForMemRS
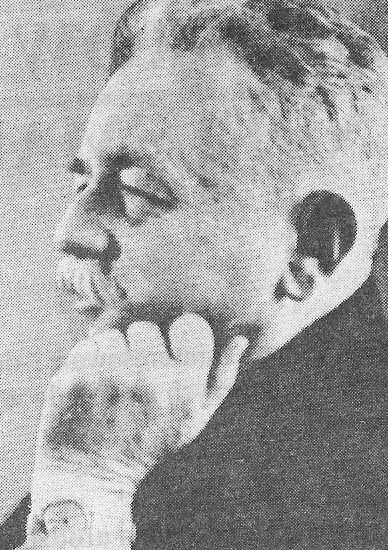
- Portrait of Handelsman from an edition of Mówią Wieki, 1988
- Born: July 8, 1882; Warsaw, Warsaw Governorate, Congress Poland
- Died: March 20, 1945 (aged 62); Mittelbau-Dora, Gau Thuringia, Nazi Germany
- Other names: Maciej Romański; Maciej Targowski
- Occupation: Historian
- Board member of: Polish Historical Society

Academic background
- Education: University of Zurich
- Thesis: Napoléon et la Pologne, 1806-1807 (1909)
- Doctoral advisor: Gerold Meyer von Knonau

Academic work
- Discipline: History
- Institutions: Józef Piłsudski University of Warsaw
- Notable students: Stanisław Arnold; Artur Eisenbach; Aleksander Gieysztor; Stefan Kieniewicz; Marian Małowist; Tadeusz Manteuffel; Emanuel Ringelblum; Henryk Sędziwy; Mieczysław Żywczyński
- WWII
- Allegiance: Home Army
- Service: Bureau of Information and Propaganda
- Service years: 1942-44

Marceli Handelsman (1882–1945) was a Polish historian, a Warsaw University professor, medievalist, modern historian, and historical methodologist.

== Life ==
Handelsman was born on 8 July 1882, in Warsaw, to a family of distant Jewish ancestry. After graduating in law from the Russian-language Imperial Warsaw University, he moved to Berlin, where he began studies in the history department of Unter den Linden University. In 1906, however, he was dismissed from the school because of his involvement in socialist organizations. Afterwards Handelsman continued his studies at various European universities including Paris, Zürich (where he received his doctorate in 1908), Rapperswil, Vienna and finally London.

During World War I, in 1915, Handelsman returned to Warsaw and joined Warsaw University as a professor of modern history. He was also appointed a member of the Polish Academy of Learning. One of the most prominent historians of the age, between 1918 and 1939 he was also the editor-in-chief of the Historical Review and the head of a Commission for the Atlas of History of Polish Lands (1920–35). He was also a member of the Academy of Moral and Political Sciences in Paris and the London-based Royal Society.

Initially a medievalist, in the Interbellum Handelsman devoted much study to 19th-century Polish political history, including the works of Prince Adam Jerzy Czartoryski and the Hôtel Lambert circle.

After the outbreak of World War II Handelsman hid from the Germans because of his Jewish roots. Nevertheless, he took an active part in underground education in Poland during World War II and served as a professor in the underground Warsaw University. After 1942, under the noms de guerre "Maciej Romański" and "Maciej Targowski," he worked with the Bureau of Information and Propaganda of the Home Army.

Arrested by the Gestapo in 1944, he was sent to Gross-Rosen concentration camp. Subsequently transferred to Mittelbau-Dora concentration camp, he was murdered on 20 March 1945.

== Students ==
Among his students were many figures including Stanisław Arnold, Artur Eisenbach, Aleksander Gieysztor, Stefan Kieniewicz, Marian Małowist, Tadeusz Manteuffel, Emanuel Ringelblum, Henryk Sędziwy and Mieczysław Żywczyński.

== See also ==
- List of Poles
