= Henryk Sędziwy =

Polish high school history teacher (1903–1999)

- Born: 6 May 1903; Łódź
- Died: 5 January 1999 (aged 95); Kraków
- Resting place: Rakowicki Cemetery
- Citizenship: Polish
- Education: University of Warsaw
- Occupations: teacher, author of textbooks
- Employer: Bartłomiej Nowodworski High School

Henryk Sędziwy (6 May 1903 – 5 January 1999) was a high school history teacher and author of textbooks, between 1948 and 1971 the principal of Bartłomiej Nowodworski High School in Kraków.

== Biography ==
He was the son of Helena and Alojzy, who were textile workers. His teacher, J. Gastmanowa, persuaded his parents to agree to further education of their son and provided Henryk Sędziwy with material support. He graduated from Nicolaus Copernicus Gymnasium in Łódź. He began his studies at the University of Warsaw, where he was a student of Marceli Handelsman. In 1928, he earned a master's degree in philosophy in history from the University of Warsaw. In 1930, he received his secondary school teacher's diploma. During his studies, he tutored to support himself. The strain of work and the poor living conditions undermined his health, leading him to develop lung disease. Thanks to the support of Marceli Handelsman and J. Gastmanowa, he began treatment at a sanatorium in Zakopane.

From February to June 1925, thanks to Handelsman's protection, he taught history as a substitute at the State Gymnasium in Zakopane. Among his students at that time was Stefan Chałubiński. In the school year 1925–1926 he was the head of the school boarding house. From October 1937 to 1 September 1939, he was the principal of the Oswald Balzer State High School and Gymnasium in Zakopane (he won the competition for this position). Under his management, the school building was renovated. As principal, Henryk Sędziwy allowed schoolchildren to participate in skiing competitions provided they represented the Scout Ski Club and achieved good academic results. He issued an order allowing smoking only for students from the oldest high school classes who had parental permission. After the Third Reich invaded Poland, he handed over the management of the school to Janina Hełm-Pirgowa.

From September 1939 to February 1940, he participated in the evacuation of the Kraków School District Board. He then went to his family on vacation in Kolomyia. In February 1940, he returned to Zakopane. On February 12, 1940, he was arrested by the Gestapo. He was released after twelve days in prison on medical certificates of lung disease and ordered to leave Zakopane and the Nowy Targ district within three days. He settled in the village of Zawadka, and a year later in Tymbark, where he worked at the Podhale Fruit and Vegetable Cooperative. In the years 1942–1945, he was the head and teacher of clandestine education in the Limanowa district. He was active in the Home Army, heading the District Education Commission for the Limanowa Oblast and collaborating with the information and propaganda unit of the Nowy Sącz Home Army Inspectorate. The scope of clandestine education eventually expanded to encompass the entire Limanowa Oblast. Two high school leaving examinations were successfully held.

In February 1945, he once again assumed the position of principal of the State High School and Gymnasium in Zakopane, a position he held until the end of August 1948. At the beginning of September 1948, he was appointed principal of the Bartłomiej Nowodworski High School in Kraków ("Nowodworek"). He held this position continuously until his retirement at the beginning of September 1971. At "Nowodworek", he taught history and Polish studies. He developed a tutorial for students entitled How to Learn?. He led a history club for the senior students.

In the opinion of Jerzy Vetulani, ( frequency cited pharmacologist) after the World War II, Bartłomiej Nowodworski High School had “a fantastic teaching staff that really shaped people”, which was to be high school's “great strength” and a “great merit” of its principal, Henryk Sędziwy.

Henryk Sędziwy was the author of history textbooks; his textbook for the 11th grade of primary school was mandatory in the 1960s. He died on January 5, 1999. He was buried at the Rakowicki Cemetery in Kraków.

== Books ==
- Historia dla klasy VII. Warszawa. 1959.
- Historia dla klasy XI cz. 2. Od końca I wojny światowej do konferencji w Poczdamie. Warszawa. 1962.
- Organizacja pracy w szkole: poradnik kierowników i dyrektorów szkół. Warszawa: Wydawnictwo PZWS. 1967. Co-author: Włodzimierz Gałecki.
- Historia 1917–1945. Warszawa: Wydawnictwo PZWS. 1967.
- Krótki zarys dziejów Polski 1870–1964, część trzecia. Warszawa: Wydawnictwo PZWS. 1969. Co-author: Ryszard Pietrzykowski.
- Pedagogiczne kierowanie szkołą ogólnokształcącą. Warszawa: Wydawnictwa Szkolne i Pedagogiczne. 1976.
- Historia szkół nowodworskich w latach 1945–1988. Kraków: Wydawnictwo AGH. 1988. Co-author: Józef Bąk.

== Awards ==
- Gold Cross of Merit (1957),
- Odznaka 1000-lecia Państwa Polskiego (1962),
- Knight's Cross of Polonia Restituta (1963),
- Medal 20-lecia PRL (1964),
- Medal of the Commission of National Education (1973),
- ZNP Badge for clandestine teaching (1985),
- ZNP Gold Badge (1986),
- Zasłużony dla Ziemi Krakowskiej (Meritorious for the Kraków Region; 1986),
- Officer's Cross of Polonia Restituta (1986).
