= Dzień Dobry Wakacje =

Polish morning show

- Presented by: Dorota Wellman; Marcin Prokop; Paulina Krupińska-Karpiel; Damian Michałowski; Ewa Drzyzga; Krzysztof Skórzyński; Gabi Drzewiecka; Mateusz Hładki; Anna Senkara; Robert Stockinger
- Opening theme: Lauri Stras - "Sunny Day"
- Country of origin: Poland

Production
- Production location: TVN's studio in Warsaw
- Running time: 150 minutes

Original release
- Network: TVN (also iTVN and TVN HD)
- Release: 3 July 2010 – present

Related
- Dzień Dobry TVN

Dzień Dobry Wakacje (Polish pronunciation: [ˈd͡ʑɛɲ ˈdɔ.brɘ vaˈka.t͡sjɛ], Eng. Good Morning Vacation) is a Polish morning show, spin-off of Dzień Dobry TVN. It is broadcast in July and August on weekends from 8:30 to 11:00. The first show aired on 3 July 2010 on TVN. Dzień Dobry Wakacje is presented by Dzień Dobry TVN presenters and various guest presenters.

In 2020 the show's theme music is the same as Dzień Dobry TVN. Earlier it was a song called Sunny Day.

== Hosts ==
Seasons	Hosts
2010-2023	Dorota Wellman
2010-2023	Marcin Prokop
2020-2023	Paulina Krupińska-Karpiel
2020-2023	Damian Michałowski
2021-2023	Ewa Drzyzga
2023	Krzysztof Skórzyński
2019, 2023	Gabi Drzewiecka
2019, 2023	Mateusz Hładki
2019, 2023	Anna Senkara
2019, 2023	Robert Stockinger
2010	Dorota Gardias
2010-2012, 2014	Jolanta Pieńkowska
2010-2015	Robert Kantereit
2010-2015	Bartosz Węglarczyk
2010-2012;	Bartosz Węglarczyk
2011-2013; 2017-2019	Kinga Burzyńska
2015-2016	Urszula Chincz
2010, 2012-2017	Magda Mołek
2013-2018	Marcin Meller
2016-2019	Marcin Sawicki
2016-2019	Piotr Kraśko
2019	Anna Wendzikowska
2019	Bartłomiej Jędrzejak
2019	Barbara Pasek
2019	Piotr Wojtasik
2019	Katarzyna Jaroszyńska
2019	Katarzyna Olubińska
2010-2019	Kinga Rusin
2010-2012, 2017-2022	Andrzej Sołtysik
2013-2014, 2021-2022	Agnieszka Woźniak-Starak
2014, 2015-2022	Filip Chajzer
2015-2022	Anna Kalczyńska
2019-2022	Małgorzata Ohme

== List of episodes ==
=== Summer 2010 ===
In 2010 Dzień Dobry Wakacje was broadcast from 3 July to 28 August on Saturdays between 9:00 and 11:30.

Date	Presenters
3 July 2010	Jolanta Pieńkowska & Bartosz Węglarczyk
10 July 2010	Magda Mołek & Robert Kantereit
17 July 2010	Dorota Gardias & Marcin Prokop
24 July 2010	Dorota Gardias & Bartosz Węglarczyk
31 July 2010	Kinga Rusin & Robert Kantereit
7 August 2010	Dorota Gardias & Andrzej Sołtysik
14 August 2010	Dorota Gardias & Bartosz Węglarczyk
21 August 2010	Dorota Wellman & Bartosz Węglarczyk
28 August 2010	Dorota Gardias & Bartosz Węglarczyk

=== Summer 2011 ===
In 2011 the show was broadcast from 2 July on Saturdays and Sundays between 8:30 and 11:00.

Date	Presenters
2 July 2011	Jolanta Pieńkowska & Bartosz Węglarczyk
3 July 2011	Jolanta Pieńkowska & Bartosz Węglarczyk
9 July 2011	Dorota Wellman & Marcin Prokop
10 July 2011	Dorota Wellman & Marcin Prokop
16 July 2011	Dorota Wellman & Marcin Prokop
17 July 2011	Dorota Wellman & Marcin Prokop
23 July 2011	Kinga Burzyńska & Robert Kantereit
24 July 2011	Kinga Burzyńska & Robert Kantereit
30 July 2011	Kinga Burzyńska & Bartosz Węglarczyk
31 July 2011	Kinga Burzyńska & Bartosz Węglarczyk
6 August 2011	Kinga Rusin & Andrzej Sołtysik
7 August 2011	Kinga Rusin & Andrzej Sołtysik
13 August 2011	Kinga Burzyńska & Andrzej Sołtysik
14 August 2011	Kinga Burzyńska & Andrzej Sołtysik
20 August 2011	Kinga Burzyńska & Robert Kantereit
21 August 2011	Kinga Burzyńska & Robert Kantereit
27 August 2011	Kinga Rusin & Bartosz Węglarczyk
28 August 2011	Kinga Rusin & Bartosz Węglarczyk

=== 2012 ===
In 2012, the show premiered on 1 July and is broadcast every Sunday from 8:30 to 11:00.

Date	Presenters
1 July 2012	Jolanta Pieńkowska & Robert Kantereit
8 July 2012	Dorota Wellman & Bartosz Węglarczyk
15 July 2012	Dorota Wellman & Bartosz Węglarczyk
22 July 2012	Kinga Burzyńska & Marcin Prokop
29 July 2012	Kinga Rusin & Robert Kantareit
5 August 2012	Kinga Burzyńska & Andrzej Sołtysik
12 August 2012	Magda Mołek & Andrzej Sołtysik
19 August 2012	Kinga Rusin & Andrzej Sołtysik
26 August 2012	Magda Mołek & Marcin Prokop

=== 2013 ===
In 2013, the show premiered on 30 June and is broadcast every Sunday from 8:30 to 11:00.

Date	Presenters
30 June 2013	Dorota Wellman & Marcin Prokop
7 July 2013	Dorota Wellman & Marcin Prokop
14 July 2013	Kinga Rusin & Marcin Prokop
21 July 2013	Agnieszka Szulim & Bartosz Węglarczyk
28 July 2013	Agnieszka Szulim & Marcin Meller
4 August 2013	Magda Mołek & Marcin Meller
11 August 2013	Agnieszka Szulim & Marcin Meller
18 August 2013	Kinga Burzyńska & Robert Kantareit
25 August 2013	Kinga Rusin & Robert Kantareit

=== Summer 2014 ===
In 2014 the show was broadcast from 5 July on Saturdays and Sundays between 8:30 and 11:00.

Date	Presenters
5 July 2014	Dorota Wellman & Marcin Prokop
6 July 2014	Dorota Wellman & Marcin Prokop
12 July 2014	Magda Mołek & Filip Chajzer
13 July 2014	Magda Mołek & Filip Chajzer
19 July 2014	Magda Mołek & Filip Chajzer
20 July 2014	Magda Mołek & Filip Chajzer
26 July 2014	Agnieszka Szulim & Marcin Meller
27 July 2014	Agnieszka Szulim & Marcin Meller
2 August 2014	Agnieszka Szulim & Robert Kantareit
3 August 2014	Agnieszka Szulim & Robert Kantareit
9 August 2014	Kinga Rusin & Robert Kantareit
10 August 2014	Kinga Rusin & Robert Kantareit
16 August 2014	Agnieszka Szulim & Marcin Meller
17 August 2014	Agnieszka Szulim & Marcin Meller
23 August 2014	Kinga Rusin & Bartosz Węglarczyk
24 August 2014	Kinga Rusin & Bartosz Węglarczyk
30 August 2014	Jolanta Pieńkowska & Bartosz Węglarczyk
31 August 2014	Jolanta Pieńkowska & Bartosz Węglarczyk

=== Summer 2015 ===
In 2015 the show was broadcast from 27 June on Saturdays and Sundays between 8:30 and 11:00.

Date	Presenters
27 June 2014	Dorota Wellman & Marcin Prokop
28 June 2014	Dorota Wellman & Marcin Prokop
4 July 2015	Urszula Chincz & Marcin Prokop
5 July 2015	Urszula Chincz & Marcin Prokop
11 July 2015	Urszula Chincz & Dorota Wellman
12 July 2015	Urszula Chincz & Dorota Wellman
18 July 2015	Magda Mołek & Marcin Meller
19 July 2015	Magda Mołek & Marcin Meller
25 July 2015	Magda Mołek & Marcin Meller
26 July 2015	Magda Mołek & Marcin Meller
1 August 2015	Anna Kalczyńska & Robert Kantareit
2 August 2015	Anna Kalczyńska & Robert Kantareit
8 August 2015	Anna Kalczyńska & Bartosz Węglarczyk
9 August 2015	Anna Kalczyńska & Bartosz Węglarczyk
15 August 2015	Kinga Rusin & Robert Kantareit
16 August 2015	Kinga Rusin & Robert Kantareit
22 August 2015	Anna Kalczyńska & Robert Kantareit
23 August 2015	Anna Kalczyńska & Robert Kantareit
29 August 2015	Kinga Rusin & Bartosz Węglarczyk
30 August 2015	Kinga Rusin & Bartosz Węglarczyk

=== Summer 2016 ===
In 2016 the show was broadcast from 27 June on Saturdays and Sundays between 8:30 and 11:00.

Date	Presenters
25 June 2016	Dorota Wellman & Piotr Kraśko
26 June 2016	Dorota Wellman & Piotr Kraśko
2 July 2016	Dorota Wellman & Marcin Prokop
3 July 2016	Dorota Wellman & Marcin Prokop
9 July 2016	Magda Mołek & Marcin Sawicki
10 July 2016	Magda Mołek & Marcin Sawicki
16 July 2016	Magda Mołek & Marcin Meller
17 July 2016	Magda Mołek & Marcin Meller
23 July 2016	Anna Kalczyńska & Marcin Meller
24 July 2016	Anna Kalczyńska & Marcin Meller
30 July 2016	Anna Kalczyńska & Filip Chajzer
31 July 2016	Anna Kalczyńska & Filip Chajzer
6 August 2016	Anna Kalczyńska & Piotr Kraśko
7 August 2016	Anna Kalczyńska & Piotr Kraśko
13 August 2016	Urszula Chincz & Marcin Prokop
14 August 2016	Urszula Chincz & Marcin Prokop
20 August 2016	Urszula Chincz & Piotr Kraśko
21 August 2016	Urszula Chincz & Piotr Kraśko
27 August 2016	Kinga Rusin & Filip Chajzer
28 August 2016	Kinga Rusin & Filip Chajzer
