= Iza Bieżuńska-Małowist =

Polish historian

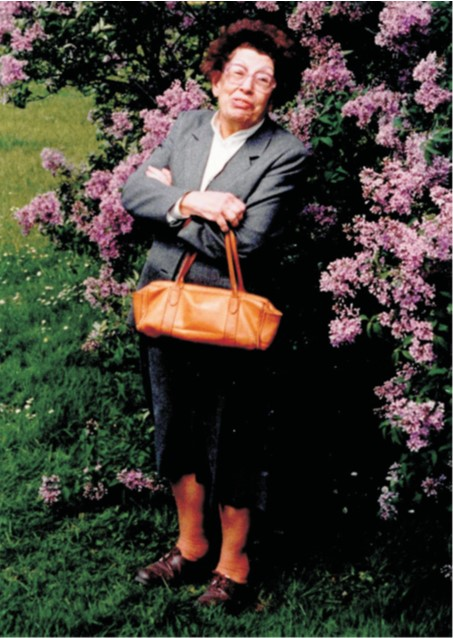
- Born: Idess Bieżuńska; 1 January 1917 (age 109); Warsaw, Government General of Warsaw, German Empire
- Died: 27 July 1995 (aged 78); Nieborów, Skierniewice Voivodeship, Third Polish Republic
- Resting place: Jewish Cemetery, Warsaw
- Occupation: Historian
- Years active: 20th century
- Spouse: Marian Małowist

Academic background
- Education: University of Warsaw
- Thesis: Quelques problèmes de l’esclavage dans la période héllenistique (1949)

Academic work
- Era: Classical antiquity
- Discipline: History
- Sub-discipline: Economic and social history
- Notable students: Jerzy Kolendo; Adam Łukaszewicz; Ewa Wipszycka
- Main interests: Women's history

Iza Bieżuńska-Małowist (1 January 1917 – 27 July 1995) was a Polish historian of the Ancient Era, professor at the Historical Institute of the University of Warsaw. Her husband Marian Małowist (1909–1988) was also a historian.

== Life ==
She was born into a Jewish family as the daughter of Eliasz and Dyna Bieżuński, who were both killed during World War Two, along with twenty-one close family members. In 1952 she took up the chair in Ancient History at the Historical Institute of the University of Warsaw, becoming the head of the ancient history department from 1969 to 1987. For many years she was a member of the editorial board of Przegląd Przegląd.

Her students included Benedetto Bravo, Hanna Geremek, Maria Jaczynowska, Jerzy Kolendo, Ryszard Kulesza, Włodzimierz Lengauer, Tadeusz Łoposzko, Adam Łukaszewicz, Jan Trynkowski, Ewa Wipszycka, Małgorzata Wojciechowska and Edward Zwolski. She died in Nieborów and was buried in the Jewish Cemetery, Warsaw (quarter 2, row 1).

== Works ==
- 1939: Położenie prawne kobiety greckiej w świetle źródeł papyrusowych
- 1948: Źródła dopływu niewolników w okresie hellenistycznym
- 1949: Dzieje ustroju rzymskiego w ujęciu Zdzisława Zmigrydera-Konopki
- 1949: Z zagadnień niewolnictwa w okresie hellenistycznym
- 1952: Poglądy nobilitas okresu Nerona i ich podłoże gospodarczo-społeczne
- 1957: Sytuacja wewnętrzna Aten w dobie wojny peloponeskiej
- 1958: Dzieje starożytnej Grecji
- 1958: Poglądy Cicerona na zadania i obowiązki męża stanu
- 1967: Ruch abolicjonistyczny a problem niewolnictwa starożytnego w historiografii XIX w.
- 1968: Główne kierunki badań nad niewolnictwem starożytnym we współczesnej historiografii
- 1987: Niewolnictwo
- 1991: W kręgu wielkich humanistów. Kultura antyczna na Uniwersytecie Warszawskim po I wojnie światowej.
- 1993: Kobiety Antyku
