= Dariusz Kołodziejczyk =

Polish historian and academic (1962–2026)

Dariusz Włodzimierz Kołodziejczyk (25 May 1962 – 16 October 2026) was a Polish historian and academic who was a professor of the University of Warsaw.

A student of Marian Małowist, Antoni Mączak, and Halil İnalcık, he specialised in the history of diplomacy and history of Poland and Turkey (Ottoman Empire).

Kołodziejczyk died on 16 October 2026, at the age of 64.

== Works ==
- Podole pod panowaniem tureckim. Ejalet Kamieniecki 1672-1699, Warsaw 1994
- Ottoman-Polish Diplomatic Relations (15th-18th century). An Annotated Edition of 'Ahdnames and Other Documents, Leiden 2000
- Turcja, Warsaw 2000
- Defter-i Mufassal-i Eyalet-i Kamanice: The Ottoman Survey Register of Podolia (ca. 1681), Cambridge, Massachusetts 2004
- The Crimean Khanate and Poland-Lithuania: International Diplomacy on the European Periphery (15th-18th Century). A Study of Peace Treaties Followed by Annotated Documents, Leiden 2011
