= Stanisław Arnold =

Polish historian

Stanisław Arnold (20 December 1895 – 3 November 1973) was a Polish historian, professor of the University of Warsaw. He was a member of the Polish Academy of Sciences and chief of the Marxist Association of Historians.

== Biography ==
Arnold was born on 20 December 1895 in Dąbrowa Górnicza. He was the son of Jan, director of a mine, and Romana née Bojanowski. In 1920 he defended his PhD thesis Władztwo biskupie na grodzie wolborskim w wieku XIII under supervision of Marceli Handelsman. Later he became an employee of the University of Warsaw, with which he was connected until retirement in 1966. From 1924 to 1928, he was working as a history teacher at Stefan Batory 2nd High School in Warsaw. he died on 3 November 1973 in Warsaw.

== Students ==
His students was Artur Eisenbach.

== Selected publications ==
- Możnowładztwo polskie w XI i XII wieku i jego podstawy gospodarczo-społeczne (1925)
- Terytoria plemienne w ustroju administracyjnym Polski piastowskiej (wiek XII-XIII) (1927)
- W sprawie ustroju plemiennego na ziemiach polskich (1928)
- Geografia historyczna, jej zasady i metody (1929)
- Rozwój handlu polskiego (1939)
- Geografia historyczna Polski (1951)
- Historia Polski od połowy XV wieku do roku 1795 (1953, with Kazimierz Piwarski and Jerzy Michalski)
- Podłoże gospodarczo-społeczne polskiego Odrodzenia (1953)

== Bibliography ==
- Biogramy uczonych polskich, Część I: Nauki społeczne, zeszyt 1: A-J, Wrocław 1983.
