= January 13 =

January 13 this year in various calendars
- Tuesday, 13 January 2026
Akan	Nkyibene
Armenian	27 Arach 1475
Aztec	Toxcatl 3, 4 Ozomahtli
Babylonian	23 Kislimu, 2336 SE
Balinese pawukon	Luang, Pepet, Kajeng, Jaya, Keliwon, Urukung, Anggara of Tambir, Kala, Dadi, Pati
Bengali	29 Poush, BS 1432
Chinese	Yin Fire Pig・Tail Mansion; Wood Snake Year, Month 11, Day 25 (Xiaohan, 7 days until Dahan)
Common Era	13 January 2026 CE
Coptic	5 Tobi, AM 1742
Egyptian	2 Payni, 2774 NE
Ethiopian	5 Ṭer, 2018 Amätä Məhrät
French Republican	Décade III, Quartidi de Nivôse de l'Année 234 de la République
Gregorian	13 January, AD 2026
Hebrew	24 Tevet, AM 5786
Hindu	Viśākhā・Śūla; Solar: 29 Pauṣa, 1947 SE; Lunisolar: Daśamī, Kṛishna pakṣa of Pauṣa, 2082 VE; Siddhārthin・5126 KY・1,872,588
Icelandic	Þriðjudagur, 21 Mörsugur 2025
Islamic	24 Rajab, AH 1447 (using tabular method)
ISO week date	2026-W03-2
Japanese	25 Shimotsuki, Reiwa 8 (Shōkan, 7 days until Daikan)
Julian	31 December, AD 2025 (AM 7535)
Julian day	2461054
Korean	25 Jwidal, 4358 DE
Maya	13.0.13.4.11; 9 Muan, 4 Chuen
Roman	Pridie Kalendas Ianuarias, MMDCCLXXIX AUC
Solar Hijri	23 Dey, SH 1404
Tibetan	25 mgo, shing mo sbrul 2152 or 1771 or 999

<<	January					>>
Su	Mo	Tu	We	Th	Fr	Sa
				1	2	3
4	5	6	7	8	9	10
11	12	13	14	15	16	17
18	19	20	21	22	23	24
25	26	27	28	29	30	31
2026

January 13 in recent years
2026 (Tuesday)
2025 (Monday)
2024 (Saturday)
2023 (Friday)
2022 (Thursday)
2021 (Wednesday)
2020 (Monday)
2019 (Sunday)
2018 (Saturday)
2017 (Friday)

January 13 is the 13th day of the year in the Gregorian calendar; 352 days remain until the end of the year (353 in leap years).

== Events ==
=== Pre-1600 ===
- 27 BC – Octavian transfers the state to the free disposal of the Roman Senate and the people. He receives Spain, Gaul, and Syria as his province for ten years.
- 532 – The Nika riots break out, during the racing season at the Hippodrome in Constantinople, as a result of discontent with the rule of the Emperor Justinian I.
- 1435 – Sicut Dudum, forbidding the enslavement by the Spanish of the Guanche natives in Canary Islands who had converted, or were converting to, Christianity, is promulgated by Pope Eugene IV.
- 1547 – Henry Howard, Earl of Surrey, is sentenced to death for treason, on the grounds of having quartered his arms to make them similar to those of the King, Henry VIII of England.

=== 1601–1900 ===
- 1793 – Nicolas Jean Hugon de Bassville, representative of Revolutionary France, is lynched by a mob in Rome.
- 1797 – French Revolutionary Wars: A naval battle between a French ship of the line and two British frigates off the coast of Brittany ends with the French vessel running aground, resulting in over 900 deaths.
- 1815 – War of 1812: British troops capture Fort Peter in St. Marys, Georgia, the only battle of the war to take place in the state.
- 1822 – The design of the Greek flag is adopted by the First National Assembly at Epidaurus.
- 1833 – United States President Andrew Jackson writes to Vice President elect Martin Van Buren expressing his opposition to South Carolina's defiance of federal authority in the Nullification Crisis.
- 1840 – The steamship Lexington burns and sinks four miles off the coast of Long Island with the loss of 139 lives.
- 1842 – Dr. William Brydon, an assistant surgeon in the British East India Company Army during the First Anglo-Afghan War, becomes famous for being the sole survivor of an army of 4,500 men and 12,000 camp followers when he reaches the safety of a garrison in Jalalabad, Afghanistan.
- 1847 – The Treaty of Cahuenga ends the Mexican–American War in California.
- 1849 – Establishment of the Colony of Vancouver Island.
- 1849 – Second Anglo-Sikh War: Battle of Chillianwala: British forces retreat from the Sikhs.
- 1888 – The National Geographic Society is founded in Washington, D.C.
- 1893 – The Independent Labour Party of the United Kingdom holds its first meeting.
- 1893 – U.S. Marines land in Honolulu, Hawaii from the USS Boston to prevent the queen from abrogating the Bayonet Constitution.
- 1895 – First Italo-Ethiopian War: The war's opening battle, the Battle of Coatit, occurs; it is an Italian victory.
- 1898 – Émile Zola's J'accuse…! exposes the Dreyfus affair.
- 1900 – To combat Czech nationalism, Emperor Franz Joseph decrees German will be language of the Austro-Hungarian Armed Forces.

=== 1901–present ===
- 1908 – The Rhoads Opera House fire in Boyertown, Pennsylvania kills 171 people.
- 1915 – The 6.7 M_{w} Avezzano earthquake shakes the Province of L'Aquila in Italy with a maximum Mercalli intensity of XI (Extreme), killing between 29,978 and 32,610.
- 1920 – The Reichstag Bloodbath of January 13, 1920, the bloodiest demonstration in German history.
- 1935 – A plebiscite in Saarland shows that 90.3% of those voting wish to no more being a "region occupied and governed by the United Kingdom and France".
- 1939 – The Black Friday bushfires burn 20,000 square kilometres (7,700 sq mi) of land in Australia, claiming the lives of 71 people.
- 1942 – Henry Ford patents a soybean car, which is 30% lighter than a regular car.
- 1942 – World War II: First use of an aircraft ejection seat by a German test pilot in a Heinkel He 280 jet fighter.
- 1950 – British submarine HMS Truculent collides with an oil tanker in the Thames Estuary, killing 64 men.
- 1950 – Finland forms diplomatic relations with the People's Republic of China.
- 1951 – First Indochina War: The Battle of Vĩnh Yên begins.
- 1953 – An article appears in Pravda accusing some of the most prestigious and prominent doctors, mostly Jews, in the Soviet Union of taking part in a vast plot to poison members of the top Soviet political and military leadership.
- 1958 – The Moroccan Army of Liberation ambushes a Spanish patrol in the Battle of Edchera.
- 1963 – Coup d'état in Togo results in the assassination of president Sylvanus Olympio.
- 1964 – Anti-Muslim riots break out in Calcutta, in response to anti-Hindu riots in East Pakistan. About one hundred people are killed.
- 1964 – In Manchester, New Hampshire, fourteen-year-old Pamela Mason is murdered. Edward Coolidge is tried and convicted of the crime, but the conviction is set aside by the landmark Fourth Amendment case Coolidge v. New Hampshire (1971).
- 1966 – Robert C. Weaver becomes the first African American Cabinet member when he is appointed United States Secretary of Housing and Urban Development.
- 1968 – Johnny Cash performs live at Folsom State Prison.
- 1972 – Prime Minister Kofi Abrefa Busia and President Edward Akufo-Addo of Ghana are ousted in a bloodless military coup by Colonel Ignatius Kutu Acheampong.
- 1977 – Japan Air Lines Cargo Flight 1045, a Douglas DC-8 jet, crashes onto the runway during takeoff from Ted Stevens Anchorage International Airport, killing five.
- 1978 – United States Food and Drug Administration requires all blood donations to be labeled "paid" or "volunteer" donors.
- 1982 – Shortly after takeoff, Air Florida Flight 90, a Boeing 737 jet, crashes into Washington, D.C.'s 14th Street Bridge and falls into the Potomac River, killing 78 including four motorists.
- 1985 – A passenger train plunges into a ravine in Ethiopia, killing 428 in the worst railroad disaster in Africa.
- 1986 – A month-long violent struggle begins in Aden, South Yemen between supporters of Ali Nasir Muhammad and Abdul Fattah Ismail, resulting in thousands of casualties.
- 1988 – Lee Teng-hui becomes the first native Taiwanese President of the Republic of China.
- 1990 – Douglas Wilder becomes the first elected African American governor as he takes office as Governor of Virginia in Richmond, Virginia.
- 1991 – Soviet Union troops attack Lithuanian independence supporters in Vilnius, killing 14 people and wounding around 1,000 others.
- 1993 – Space Shuttle program: Endeavour heads for space for the third time as STS-54 launches from the Kennedy Space Center.
- 1993 – The Chemical Weapons Convention (CWC) is signed.
- 1993 – Operation Southern Watch: U.S.A.F., U.S.N., R.A.F. and French Air Force jets attack AAA and SAM sites in Southern Iraq.
- 1998 – Alfredo Ormando sets himself on fire in St. Peter's Square, protesting against homophobia.
- 2000 – A Short 360 aircraft chartered by the Sirte Oil Company crashes off the coast of Brega, Libya, killing 21.
- 2001 – An earthquake hits El Salvador, killing more than 800.
- 2003 – 208996 Achlys was discovered by Chad Trujillo and Michael E. Brown at Palomar Observatory.
- 2004 – Uzbekistan Airways Flight 1154 crashes while landing at Tashkent International Airport, killing 37.
- 2012 – The passenger cruise ship Costa Concordia sinks off the coast of Italy due to the captain Francesco Schettino's negligence and irresponsibility. There are 32 confirmed deaths.
- 2018 – A false emergency alert warning of an impending missile strike in Hawaii causes widespread panic in the state.
- 2020 – The Thai Ministry of Public Health confirms the first case of COVID-19 outside China.
- 2021 – Outgoing U.S. President Donald Trump is impeached for a second time on a charge of incitement of insurrection following the January 6 United States Capitol attack one week prior.

== Births ==
=== Pre-1600 ===
- 5 BC – Guangwu of Han, Chinese emperor (died 57)
- 101 – Lucius Aelius, Roman adopted son of Hadrian (died 138)
- 915 – Al-Hakam II, Umayyad caliph (died 976)
- 1334 – Henry II, king of Castile and León (died 1379)
- 1338 – Chŏng Mong-ju, Korean civil minister, diplomat and scholar (died 1392)
- 1381 – Colette of Corbie, French abbess and saint in the Catholic Church (died 1447)
- 1400 – Infante John, Constable of Portugal (died 1442)
- 1477 – Henry Percy, 5th Earl of Northumberland (died 1527)
- 1505 – Joachim II Hector, Elector of Brandenburg (died 1571)
- 1562 – Mark Alexander Boyd, Scottish poet and soldier (died 1601)
- 1596 – Jan van Goyen, Dutch painter and illustrator (died 1656)

=== 1601–1900 ===
- 1610 – Maria Anna of Bavaria, archduchess of Austria (died 1665)
- 1616 – Antoinette Bourignon, French-Flemish mystic and author (died 1680)
- 1651 – Henry Booth, 1st Earl of Warrington, English soldier and politician, Chancellor of the Exchequer (died 1694)
- 1672 – Lucy Filippini, Italian teacher and saint (died 1732)
- 1683 – Christoph Graupner, German harpsichord player and composer (died 1760)
- 1720 – Richard Hurd, English bishop (died 1808)
- 1749 – Maler Müller, German poet, painter, and playwright (died 1825)
- 1787 – John Davis, American lawyer and politician, 14th Governor of Massachusetts (died 1854)
- 1804 – Paul Gavarni, French illustrator (died 1866)
- 1805 – Thomas Dyer, American lawyer and politician, 18th Mayor of Chicago (died 1862)
- 1808 – Salmon P. Chase, American jurist and politician, 6th Chief Justice of the United States (died 1873)
- 1810 – Ernestine Rose, American suffragist, abolitionist, and freethinker (died 1892)
- 1812 – Victor de Laprade, French poet and critic (died 1883)
- 1832 – Horatio Alger, Jr., American novelist and journalist (died 1899)
- 1845 – Félix Tisserand, French astronomer and academic (died 1896)
- 1858 – Oskar Minkowski, Lithuanian-German biologist and academic (died 1931)
- 1859 – Kostis Palamas, Greek poet and playwright (died 1943)
- 1861 – Max Nonne, German neurologist and academic (died 1959)
- 1864 – Wilhelm Wien, German physicist and academic, Nobel Prize laureate (died 1928)
- 1865 – Princess Marie of Orléans (died 1908)
- 1866 – Vasily Kalinnikov, Russian bassoon player and composer (died 1901)
- 1869 – Prince Emanuele Filiberto, Duke of Aosta (died 1931)
- 1870 – Ross Granville Harrison, American biologist and anatomist (died 1959)
- 1878 – Lionel Groulx, Canadian priest and historian (died 1967)
- 1881 – Essington Lewis, Australian engineer and businessman (died 1961)
- 1883 – Nathaniel Cartmell, American runner and coach (died 1967)
- 1885 – Alfred Fuller, Canadian-American businessman, founded the Fuller Brush Company (died 1973)
- 1886 – Art Ross, Canadian-American ice hockey player and coach (died 1964)
- 1886 – Sophie Tucker, Russian-born American singer and actress (died 1966)
- 1890 – Jüri Uluots, Estonian journalist, lawyer, and politician, 7th Prime Minister of Estonia (died 1945)
- 1892 – Ermanno Aebi, Italian-Swiss footballer (died 1976)
- 1893 – Charles Arnison, English lieutenant and pilot (died 1974)
- 1893 – Roy Cazaly, Australian footballer and coach (died 1963)
- 1893 – Clark Ashton Smith, American poet, sculptor, painter, and author (died 1961)
- 1893 – Chaïm Soutine, Belarusian-French painter (died 1943)
- 1900 – Shimizugawa Motokichi, Japanese sumo wrestler (died 1967)
- 1900 – Gertrude Mary Cox, American mathematician (died 1978)

=== 1901–present ===
- 1901 – A. B. Guthrie, Jr., American novelist, screenwriter, historian (died 1991)
- 1901 – Mieczysław Żywczyński, Polish priest and historian (died 1978)
- 1902 – Karl Menger, Austrian-American mathematician from the Vienna Circle (died 1985)
- 1904 – Richard Addinsell, English composer (died 1977)
- 1904 – Nathan Milstein, Ukrainian-American violinist and composer (died 1992)
- 1904 – Dick Rowley, Irish footballer (died 1984)
- 1905 – Kay Francis, American actress (died 1968)
- 1905 – Jack London, English sprinter and pianist (died 1966)
- 1906 – Zhou Youguang, Chinese linguist, sinologist, and academic (died 2017)
- 1909 – Helm Glöckler, German race car driver (died 1993)
- 1910 – Yannis Tsarouchis, Greek painter and illustrator (died 1989)
- 1911 – Joh Bjelke-Petersen, New Zealand-Australian farmer and politician, 31st Premier of Queensland (died 2005)
- 1914 – Osa Massen, Danish-American actress (died 2006)
- 1914 – Ted Willis, Baron Willis, English author, playwright, and screenwriter (died 1992)
- 1919 – Robert Stack, American actor (died 2003)
- 1921 – Necati Cumalı, Greek-Turkish author and poet (died 2001)
- 1921 – Dachine Rainer, American-English author and poet (died 2000)
- 1921 – Arthur Stevens, English footballer (died 2007)
- 1922 – Albert Lamorisse, French director and producer (died 1970)
- 1923 – Daniil Shafran, Russian cellist (died 1997)
- 1923 – Willem Slijkhuis, Dutch runner (died 2003)
- 1923 – Jack Watling, English actor (died 2001)
- 1924 – Paul Feyerabend, Austrian-Swiss philosopher and academic (died 1994)
- 1924 – Roland Petit, French dancer and choreographer (died 2011)
- 1925 – Rosemary Murphy, American actress (died 2014)
- 1925 – Vanita Smythe, American singer and actress (died 1994)
- 1925 – Ron Tauranac, Australian engineer and businessman (died 2020)
- 1925 – Gwen Verdon, American actress and dancer (died 2000)
- 1926 – Michael Bond, English author, created Paddington Bear (died 2017)
- 1926 – Carolyn Gold Heilbrun, American author and academic (died 2003)
- 1926 – Melba Liston, American trombonist and composer (died 1999)
- 1927 – Brock Adams, American lawyer and politician, 5th United States Secretary of Transportation (died 2004)
- 1927 – Liz Anderson, American singer-songwriter (died 2011)
- 1927 – Sydney Brenner, South African biologist and academic, Nobel Prize laureate (died 2019)
- 1929 – Joe Pass, American guitarist and composer (died 1994)
- 1930 – Frances Sternhagen, American actress (died 2023)
- 1931 – Ian Hendry, English actor (died 1984)
- 1931 – Charles Nelson Reilly, American actor, comedian, director, game show panelist, and television personality (died 2007)
- 1931 – Rip Taylor, American actor and comedian (died 2019)
- 1931 – Chris Wiggins, English-born Canadian actor (died 2017)
- 1932 – Barry Bishop, American mountaineer, photographer, and scholar (died 1994)
- 1933 – Tom Gola, American basketball player, coach, and politician (died 2014)
- 1936 – Renato Bruson, Italian opera singer
- 1937 – Guy Dodson, New Zealand-English biochemist and academic (died 2012)
- 1938 – Daevid Allen, Australian singer-songwriter and guitarist (died 2015)
- 1938 – Richard Anthony, Egyptian-French singer-songwriter (died 2015)
- 1938 – Charlie Brill, American actor, voice artist, and comedian
- 1938 – Cabu, French cartoonist (died 2015)
- 1938 – Dave Edwards, American captain and politician (died 2013)
- 1938 – Billy Gray, American actor, competitive motorcycle racer and inventor
- 1938 – Tord Grip, Swedish footballer and manager
- 1938 – Anna Home, English children's television executive and producer
- 1939 – Edgardo Cozarinsky, Argentinian author, screenwriter, and director (died 2024)
- 1939 – Jacek Gmoch, Polish footballer and coach
- 1939 – Cesare Maniago, Canadian ice hockey player
- 1940 – Edmund White, American novelist, memoirist, and essayist (died 2025)
- 1941 – Pasqual Maragall, Spanish academic and politician, 127th President of the Generalitat de Catalunya
- 1941 – Meinhard Nehmer, German bobsledder
- 1943 – William Duckworth, American composer and author (died 2012)
- 1943 – Richard Moll, American actor (died 2023)
- 1945 – Gordon McVie, English oncologist and author (died 2021)
- 1945 – Peter Simpson, English footballer
- 1946 – Ordal Demokan, Turkish physicist and academic (died 2004)
- 1946 – Eero Koivistoinen, Finnish saxophonist, composer, and conductor
- 1947 – Jacek Majchrowski, Polish historian, lawyer, and politician
- 1947 – Carles Rexach, Spanish footballer and coach
- 1948 – Gaj Singh, Indian lawyer and politician
- 1949 – Rakesh Sharma, Indian commander, pilot, and cosmonaut
- 1949 – Brandon Tartikoff, American screenwriter and producer (died 1997)
- 1950 – Clive Betts, English economist and politician
- 1950 – Bob Forsch, American baseball player (died 2011)
- 1950 – Gholam Hossein Mazloumi, Iranian footballer and manager (died 2014)
- 1952 – Stephen Glover, English journalist, co-founded The Independent
- 1953 – Silvana Gallardo, American actress and producer (died 2012)
- 1954 – Richard Blackford, English composer
- 1954 – Trevor Rabin, South African-American singer-songwriter, guitarist, and producer
- 1955 – Paul Kelly, Australian singer-songwriter, guitarist, and producer
- 1955 – Jay McInerney, American novelist and critic
- 1955 – Anne Pringle, English diplomat, British Ambassador to Russia
- 1957 – Claudia Emerson, American poet and academic (died 2014)
- 1957 – Mary Glindon, English lawyer and politician
- 1957 – Lorrie Moore, American author
- 1957 – Mark O'Meara, American golfer
- 1958 – Francisco Buyo, Spanish footballer and manager
- 1958 – Juan Pedro de Miguel, Spanish handball player (died 2016)
- 1959 – Winnie Byanyima, Ugandan engineer, politician, and diplomat
- 1960 – Kevin Anderson, American actor
- 1960 – Eric Betzig, American physicist and chemist, Nobel Prize laureate
- 1960 – Matthew Bourne, English choreographer and director
- 1961 – Wayne Coyne, American singer-songwriter and musician
- 1961 – Kelly Hrudey, Canadian ice hockey player and sportscaster
- 1961 – Julia Louis-Dreyfus, American actress, comedian, and producer
- 1961 – Suggs, English singer-songwriter, musician, and actor
- 1962 – Trace Adkins, American singer-songwriter and actor
- 1962 – Paul Higgins, Canadian ice hockey player
- 1962 – Kevin Mitchell, American baseball player
- 1964 – Penelope Ann Miller, American actress
- 1965 – Bill Bailey, English musician and comedian
- 1966 – Patrick Dempsey, American actor and race car driver
- 1966 – Leo Visser, Dutch speed skater and pilot
- 1967 – Suzanne Cryer, American actress
- 1968 – Traci Bingham, American actress, model, and television personality
- 1968 – Mike Whitlow, English footballer and coach
- 1969 – Stefania Belmondo, Italian skier
- 1969 – Stephen Hendry, Scottish snooker player and journalist
- 1970 – Keith Coogan, American actor
- 1970 – Frank Kooiman, Dutch footballer
- 1970 – Marco Pantani, Italian cyclist (died 2004)
- 1970 – Shonda Rhimes, American actress, director, producer, and screenwriter
- 1972 – Mark Bosnich, Australian footballer and sportscaster
- 1972 – Nicole Eggert, American actress
- 1972 – Vitaly Scherbo, Belarusian gymnast
- 1973 – Gigi Galli, Italian race driver
- 1973 – Nikolai Khabibulin, Russian ice hockey player
- 1974 – Sergei Brylin, Russian ice hockey player and coach
- 1974 – Jason Sasser, American basketball player
- 1975 – Rune Eriksen, Norwegian guitarist and composer
- 1975 – Mailis Reps, Estonian academic and politician, 31st Estonian Minister of Education and Research
- 1975 – Andrew Yang, American entrepreneur, founder of Venture for America, and 2020 Democratic presidential candidate
- 1976 – Ross McCall, Scottish actor
- 1976 – Michael Peña, American actor
- 1976 – Mario Yepes, Colombian footballer
- 1977 – Orlando Bloom, English actor
- 1977 – Mi-Hyun Kim, South Korean golfer
- 1977 – Elliot Mason, English trombonist and keyboard player
- 1977 – James Posey, American basketball player and coach
- 1978 – Mohit Sharma, Indian soldier (died 2009)
- 1978 – Nate Silver, American journalist and statistician, developed PECOTA
- 1979 – Katy Brand, English actress and screenwriter
- 1980 – Krzysztof Czerwiński, Polish organist and conductor
- 1980 – Nils-Eric Johansson, Swedish footballer
- 1980 – Akira Kaji, Japanese footballer
- 1980 – Wolfgang Loitzl, Austrian ski jumper
- 1980 – Mirko Soltau, German footballer
- 1980 – Mike Rupp, American ice hockey player
- 1981 – Shad Gaspard, American wrestler and actor (died 2020)
- 1982 – Kamran Akmal, Pakistani cricketer
- 1982 – Guillermo Coria, Argentinian tennis player
- 1982 – Constantinos Makrides, Cypriot footballer
- 1982 – Ruth Wilson, English actress
- 1983 – Ender Arslan, Turkish basketball player
- 1983 – Sebastian Kneißl, German footballer
- 1983 – Julian Morris, English actor
- 1983 – Mauricio Romero, Argentinian footballer
- 1983 – Ronny Turiaf, French basketball player
- 1984 – Matteo Cavagna, Italian footballer
- 1984 – Kamghe Gaba, German sprinter
- 1984 – Nick Mangold, American football player (died 2025)
- 1986 – Joannie Rochette, Canadian figure skater
- 1987 – Stefano Del Sante, Italian footballer
- 1987 – Jack Johnson, American ice hockey player
- 1987 – Florica Leonida, Romanian gymnast
- 1987 – Steven Michaels, Australian rugby league player
- 1987 – Daniel Oss, Italian cyclist
- 1987 – Marc Staal, Canadian ice hockey player
- 1988 – Josh Freeman, American football player
- 1989 – Morgan Burnett, American football player
- 1989 – Heath Hembree, American baseball player
- 1989 – Doug Martin, American football player (died 2025)
- 1989 – Beau Mirchoff, Canadian-American actor
- 1990 – Vincenzo Fiorillo, Italian footballer
- 1990 – Liam Hemsworth, Australian actor
- 1991 – Rob Kiernan, English-Irish footballer
- 1991 – Kyle Clifford, Canadian ice hockey player
- 1992 – Adam Matthews, Welsh footballer
- 1992 – Dinah Pfizenmaier, German tennis player
- 1992 – Austin Watson, American ice hockey player
- 1993 – Max Whitlock, English artistic gymnast
- 1994 – Vasilije Micić, Serbian basketball player
- 1995 – Natalia Dyer, American actress
- 1995 – Maxim Mamin, Russian ice hockey player
- 1995 – Eros Vlahos, English actor and comedian
- 1997 – Douglas Augusto, Brazilian footballer
- 1997 – Egan Bernal, Colombian cyclist
- 1997 – Luis Díaz, Colombian footballer
- 1997 – Henry Ellenson, American basketball player
- 1997 – Connor McDavid, Canadian ice hockey player
- 1997 – Ivan Provorov, Russian ice hockey player
- 2000 – Harley Smith-Shields, Australian rugby league player
- 2003 – Oksana Selekhmeteva, Russian tennis player
- 2005 – Iker Bravo, Spanish footballer

== Deaths ==
=== Pre-1600 ===
- 86 BC – Gaius Marius, Roman general and politician (born 157 BC)
- 533 – Remigius, French bishop and saint (born 437)
- 614 – Mungo, English-Scottish bishop and saint
- 703 – Jitō, Japanese empress (born 645)
- 858 – Æthelwulf, king of Wessex
- 888 – Charles the Fat, Frankish king and emperor (born 839)
- 927 – Berno of Cluny, Frankish monk and abbot
- 1001 – Fujiwara no Teishi, Japanese empress (born 977)
- 1147 – Robert de Craon, Grand Master of the Knights Templar
- 1151 – Suger, French historian and politician (born 1081)
- 1177 – Henry II, count palatine and duke of Austria (born 1107)
- 1321 – Bonacossa Borri, Italian noblewoman (born 1254)
- 1330 – Frederick I, duke and king of Germany
- 1363 – Meinhard III, German nobleman (born 1344)
- 1400 – Thomas le Despenser, 1st Earl of Gloucester, English politician (born 1373)
- 1599 – Edmund Spenser, English poet, Chief Secretary for Ireland (born 1552)

=== 1601–1900 ===
- 1612 – Jane Dormer, English lady-in-waiting (born 1538)
- 1625 – Jan Brueghel the Elder, Flemish painter (born 1568)
- 1684 – Henry Howard, 6th Duke of Norfolk, English nobleman (born 1628)
- 1691 – George Fox, English religious leader, founded the Religious Society of Friends (born 1624)
- 1717 – Maria Sibylla Merian, German entomologist and illustrator (born 1647)
- 1775 – Johann Georg Walch, German theologian and author (born 1693)
- 1790 – Luc Urbain de Bouëxic, French admiral (born 1712)
- 1796 – John Anderson, Scottish philosopher and educator (born 1726)
- 1832 – Thomas Lord, English cricketer, founded Lord's Cricket Ground (born 1755)
- 1838 – Ferdinand Ries, German pianist and composer (born 1784)
- 1860 – William Mason, American surgeon and politician (born 1786)
- 1864 – Stephen Foster, American composer and songwriter (born 1826)
- 1872 – William Scamp, English architect and engineer (born 1801)
- 1882 – Juraj Dobrila, Croatian bishop and national revivalist (born 1812)
- 1882 – Wilhelm Mauser, German engineer and businessman, co-founded the Mauser Company (born 1834)
- 1885 – Schuyler Colfax, American journalist and politician, 17th Vice President of the United States (born 1823)
- 1889 – Solomon Bundy, American lawyer and politician (born 1823)

=== 1901–present ===
- 1906 – Alexander Stepanovich Popov, Russian physicist and academic (born 1859)
- 1907 – Jakob Hurt, Estonian theologist and linguist (born 1839)
- 1915 – Mary Slessor, Scottish-Nigerian missionary (born 1848)
- 1916 – Victoriano Huerta, Mexican military officer and president, 1913–1914 (born 1850)
- 1923 – Alexandre Ribot, French academic and politician, Prime Minister of France (born 1842)
- 1924 – Georg Hermann Quincke, German physicist and academic (born 1834)
- 1928 – Earle Nelson, American serial killer
- 1929 – Wyatt Earp, American police officer (born 1848)
- 1929 – H. B. Higgins, Irish-Australian judge and politician, 3rd Attorney-General for Australia (born 1851)
- 1934 – Paul Ulrich Villard, French physicist and chemist (born 1860)
- 1941 – James Joyce, Irish novelist, short story writer, and poet (born 1882)
- 1943 – Sophie Taeuber-Arp, Swiss painter and sculptor (born 1889)
- 1949 – Aino Aalto, Finnish architect and designer (born 1894)
- 1956 – Lyonel Feininger, German-American painter and illustrator (born 1871)
- 1957 – A. E. Coppard English poet and short story writer (born 1878)
- 1958 – Jesse L. Lasky, American film producer, co-founded Paramount Pictures (born 1880)
- 1958 – Edna Purviance, American actress (born 1895)
- 1962 – Ernie Kovacs, American actor and game show host (born 1919)
- 1963 – Sylvanus Olympio, Togolese businessman and politician, President of Togo (born 1902)
- 1967 – Anatole de Grunwald, Russian-English screenwriter and producer (born 1910)
- 1971 – Robert Still, English composer and educator (born 1910)
- 1973 – Sabahattin Eyüboğlu, Turkish screenwriter and producer (born 1908)
- 1974 – Raoul Jobin, Canadian tenor and educator (born 1906)
- 1974 – Salvador Novo, Mexican playwright and poet (born 1904)
- 1976 – Margaret Leighton, English actress (born 1922)
- 1977 – Henri Langlois, Turkish-French historian, co-founded the Cinémathèque Française (born 1914)
- 1978 – Hubert Humphrey, American pharmacist, academic, and politician, 38th Vice President of the United States (born 1911)
- 1978 – Joe McCarthy, American baseball player and manager (born 1887)
- 1979 – Donny Hathaway, American singer-songwriter, pianist, and producer (born 1945)
- 1979 – Marjorie Lawrence, Australian-American soprano (born 1907)
- 1980 – Andre Kostelanetz, Russian-American conductor (born 1901)
- 1982 – Marcel Camus, French director and screenwriter (born 1912)
- 1983 – René Bonnet, French race car driver and engineer (born 1904)
- 1986 – Abdul Fattah Ismail, Yemeni educator and politician, 4th President of South Yemen (born 1939)
- 1986 – Kevin Longbottom, Australian rugby league player (born 1940)
- 1988 – Chiang Ching-kuo, Chinese politician, President of the Republic of China (born 1910)
- 1993 – Camargo Guarnieri, Brazilian composer and conductor (born 1907)
- 1995 – Max Harris, Australian journalist, poet, and author (born 1921)
- 2002 – Frank Shuster, Canadian actor, comedian, and screenwriter (born 1916)
- 2003 – Norman Panama, American director and screenwriter (born 1914)
- 2004 – Arne Næss, Jr., Norwegian businessman and mountaineer (born 1937)
- 2005 – Earl Cameron, Canadian journalist (born 1915)
- 2005 – Nell Rankin, American soprano and actress (born 1924)
- 2006 – Frank Fixaris, American journalist and sportscaster (born 1934)
- 2006 – Marc Potvin, Canadian-American ice hockey player and coach (born 1967)
- 2007 – Michael Brecker, American saxophonist and composer (born 1949)
- 2007 – Danny Oakes, American race car driver (born 1911)
- 2008 – Johnny Podres, American baseball player and coach (born 1932)
- 2009 – Dai Llewellyn, Welsh socialite and politician (born 1946)
- 2009 – Patrick McGoohan, Irish-American actor, director, and producer (born 1928)
- 2009 – Mansour Rahbani, Lebanese poet, composer, and producer (born 1925)
- 2009 – W. D. Snodgrass, American poet (born 1926)
- 2009 – Nancy Bird Walton, Australian pilot (born 1915)
- 2010 – Teddy Pendergrass, American singer-songwriter (born 1950)
- 2011 – Albert Heijn, Dutch businessman (born 1927)
- 2012 – Rauf Denktaş, Turkish-Cypriot lawyer and politician, 1st President of Northern Cyprus (born 1924)
- 2012 – Guido Dessauer, German physicist and engineer (born 1915)
- 2012 – Miljan Miljanić, Serbian footballer and manager (born 1930)
- 2013 – Diogenes Allen, American philosopher and theologian (born 1932)
- 2013 – Rodney Mims Cook, Sr., American lieutenant and politician (born 1924)
- 2013 – Chia-Chiao Lin, Chinese-American mathematician and academic (born 1916)
- 2014 – Bobby Collins, Scottish footballer and manager (born 1931)
- 2014 – Randal Tye Thomas, American journalist and politician (born 1978)
- 2014 – Waldemar von Gazen, German general and lawyer (born 1917)
- 2015 – Mark Juddery, Australian journalist and author (born 1971)
- 2015 – Robert White, American diplomat, United States Ambassador to Paraguay (born 1926)
- 2016 – Brian Bedford, English-American actor and director (born 1935)
- 2016 – Giorgio Gomelsky, Georgian-American director, producer, songwriter, and manager (born 1934)
- 2016 – Lawrence Phillips, American football player (born 1975)
- 2017 – Antony Armstrong-Jones, 1st Earl of Snowdon, English photographer and a former member of the British royal family (born 1930)
- 2017 – Dick Gautier, American actor (born 1931)
- 2017 – Magic Alex, Greek electronics engineer (born 1942)
- 2019 – Phil Masinga, South African footballer (born 1969)
- 2020 – Bryan Monroe, American journalist and educator, (born 1965)
- 2020 – Philip Tartaglia, Scottish prelate, Catholic archbishop of Glasgow (born 1951)
- 2024 – Joyce Randolph, American actress (born 1924)
- 2025 – Oliviero Toscani, Italian photographer (born 1942)
- 2026 – Scott Adams, American author and illustrator (born 1957)
- 2026 – David Webb, British activist shareholder (born 1965)

== Holidays and observances ==
- Christian feast day:
  - Blessed Veronica of Milan
  - Elian
  - Hilary of Poitiers
  - Mungo
  - St. Knut's Day or Tjugondag Knut, the last day of Christmas. (Sweden and Finland)
  - January 13 (Eastern Orthodox liturgics)
- Constitution Day (Mongolia)
- Democracy Day (Cape Verde)
- Gluten-free diet day
- Liberation Day (Togo)
- Old New Year's Eve (Russia, Belarus, Ukraine, Serbia, Montenegro, Republic of Srpska, North Macedonia), and its related observances:
  - Malanka (Ukraine, Russia, Belarus)
- Sidereal winter solstice's eve celebrations in South and Southeast Asian cultures; the last day of the six-month Dakshinayana period (see January 14):
  - Bhogi (Andhra Pradesh, Tamil Nadu)
  - Lohri (Punjab, Haryana, Himachal Pradesh)
  - Uruka (Assam)
- Stephen Foster Memorial Day (United States)
- Yennayer (Berbers)
