= Maria Bogucka =

Polish historian (1929–2020)

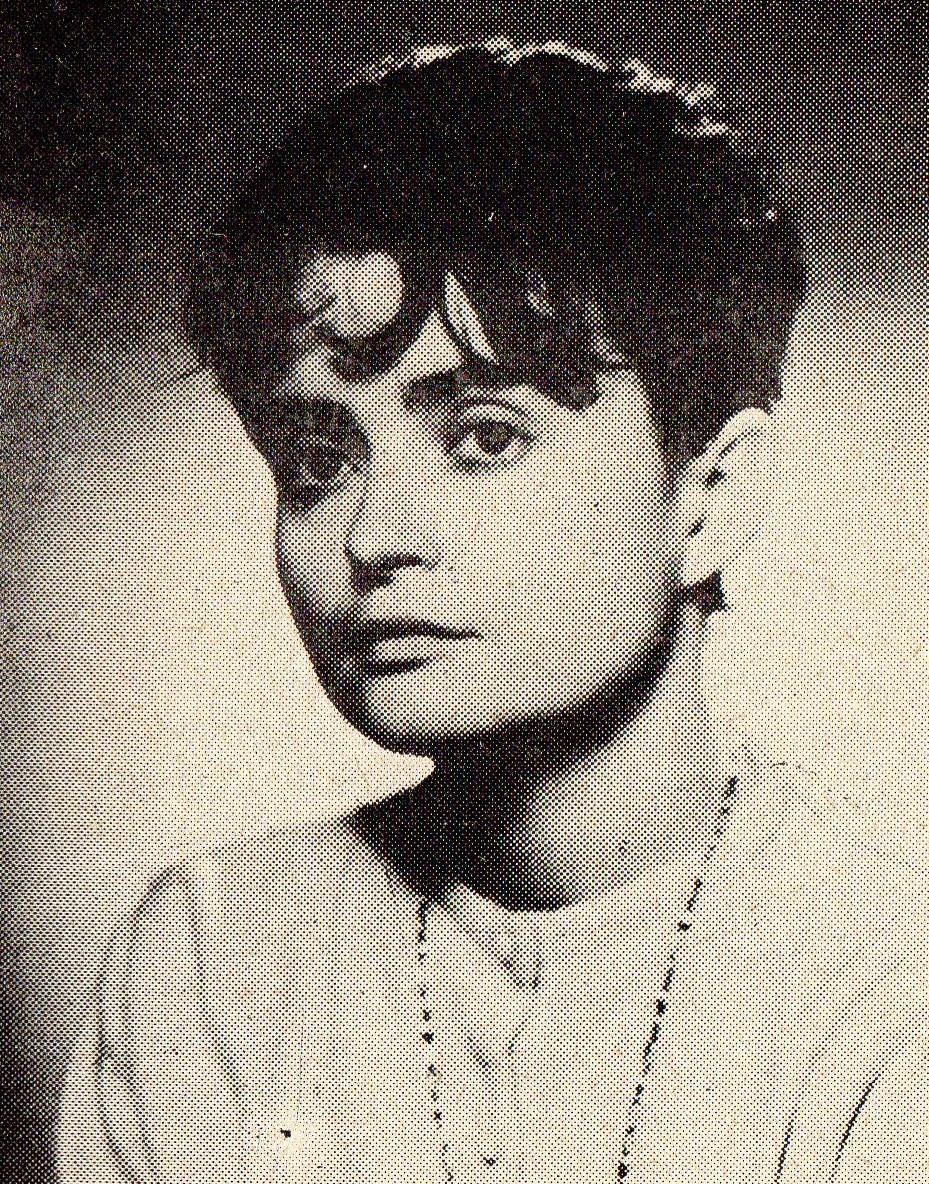
- Portrait of Bogucka from a 1978 edition of Mówią Wieki
- Born: June 1, 1929 (age 97); Warsaw, Warsaw Voivodeship, Second Polish Republic
- Died: October 27, 2020 (aged 91); Warsaw, Masovian Voivodeship, Third Polish Republic
- Occupation: Historian
- Parent(s): Jan and Helena née Kasprowicz

Academic background
- Thesis: Gdańskie rzemiosło tekstylne od XVI do połowy XVII w. (1955/6)
- Academic advisor: Marian Małowist

Academic work
- Discipline: History
- Sub-discipline: Alltagsgeschichte
- Institutions: Pułtusk Academy of Humanities
- Main interests: History of Poland, Holland and England
- Notable ideas: History of gesture
- WWII
- Allegiance: Home Army
- Service years: 1944
- Role: Nurse
- Battle: Warsaw Uprising

Maria Bogucka (June 1, 1929 – October 27, 2020) was a Polish historian, science popularizer professor, dr.hab., and former professor at the Faculty of Polish Philology Pułtusk Academy of Humanities, Pułtusk, Poland. She authored over 40 books.

She graduated from the University of Warsaw in 1951, obtaining her doctorate there in 1956 and the title of professor of humanities in 1981. In 2007 she was awarded an honorary degree by the University of Gdańsk for her "outstanding contribution to the knowledge of the history of Gdańsk and the Republic of Poland, especially of modern times, and shaping the development of modern historical science".

She is buried at the Northern Communal Cemetery in Warsaw.

== Awards and decorations ==
- 2007: City of Gdańsk President's Medal
- 1992: Officer's Cross of the Order of Polonia Restituta
- 1986: Knight's Cross of the Order of Polonia Restituta
- 1977, 1999: "Meritorious to Gdańsk Land" badge, for her research in economic history of Gdańsk
- 1974: Golden Cross of Merit

== Works in English ==
- Bogucka, Maria (1991). "Gesture, ritual, and social order in sixteenth- to eighteenth- century Poland". In Bremmer, Jan N.; Roodenburg, Herman (eds.). A Cultural History Of Gesture (PDF). University of Groningen.
