= Anna Wendzikowska =

Polish actress, journalist and television presenter

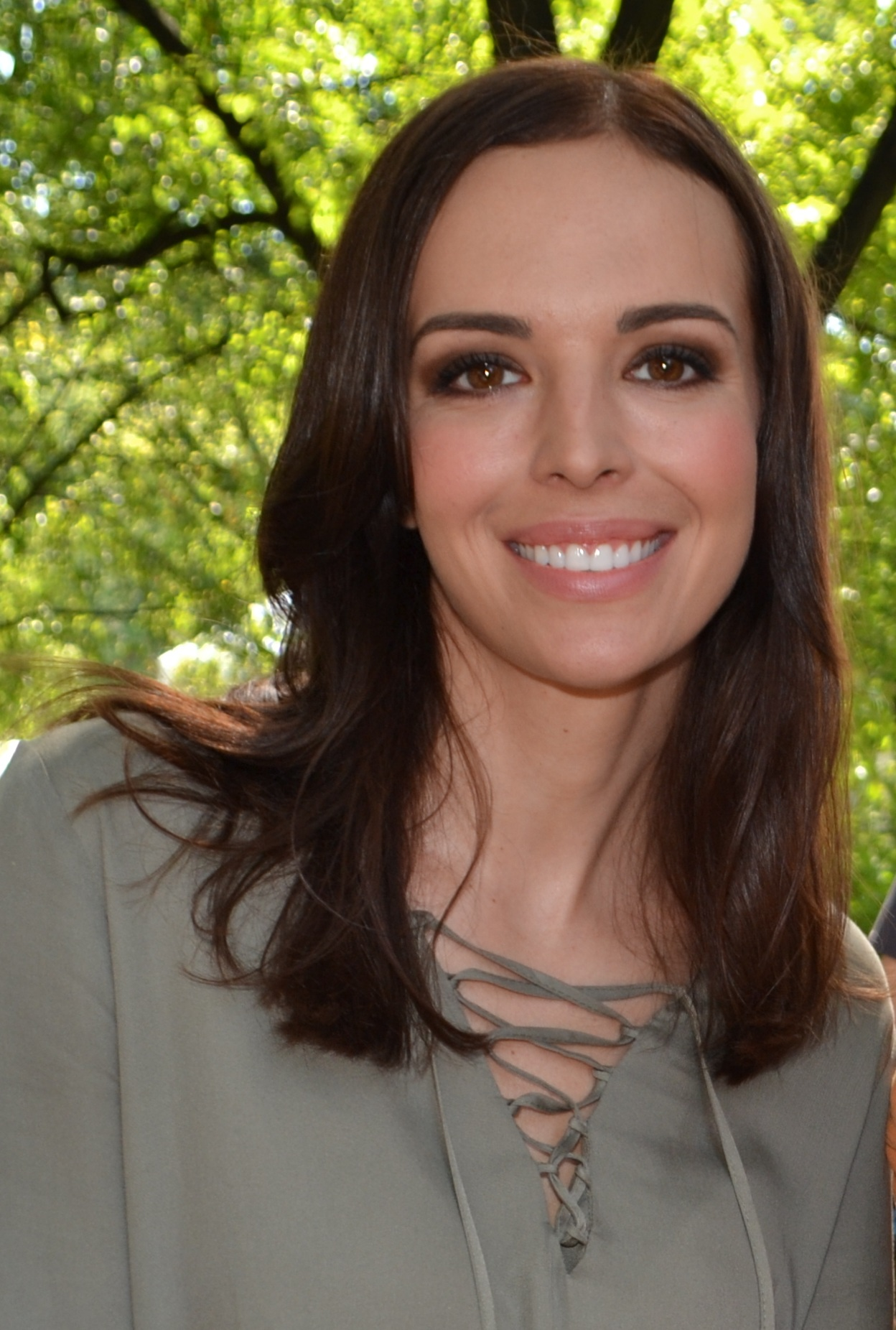
- in August 2015
- Born: 7 September 1981 (age 44); Warsaw, Poland
- Occupations: Journalist; actress
- Website: Official website

Anna Danuta Wendzikowska (born 7 September 1981) is a Polish actress, journalist and television presenter. She was a correspondent of Dzień Dobry TVN from 2007–2022.

== Career ==
She is a graduate of the Stefan Batory Gymnasium and Lyceum. She studied at the Private Acting School of Halina and Jan Machulski (Prywatnej Szkoły Aktorskiej Haliny i Jana Machulskich w Warszawie, now called Szkoła Aktorska Haliny i Jana Machulskich) in Warsaw for a year. She also began journalism studies at the University of Warsaw, but completed her studies in London, where she moved to in 2005. In London, she earned extra money by working in a call centre and as a cloakroom attendant in a restaurant.

In 2007, she appeared in the music video for the song "Kill The Pain" by Poise Rite. She performs in the television series M jak miłość, where she plays the role of Monika.

From September to October 2011, she participated in the thirteenth edition of the programme Dancing with the Stars. Taniec z gwiazdami on TVN. Her dance partner was Michał Stukan, with whom she took tenth place.

== Personal life ==
From 2007–2010 she was married to Christopher Combe, a Greek-American expatriate whom she met in London. In 2014 she met Patryk Ignaczak, band singer in AudioFeels, with whom she got engaged after a month of acquaintance. In January 2015, she gave birth to a daughter, Kornelia, and a year later, they parted ways. She met entrepreneur Jan Bazyl in 2017, with whom she has another daughter, Antonina (born 2018). They parted ways in 2020.

She is a cousin of costume designer Malwina Wędzikowska.

== Filmography ==
- 2001–02: Lokatorzy as Wioletta Puszczyk, Marlena
- 2002: Nienasycenie as Eliza
- 2003: Show as Monika
- 2004: Dziki as Kasia
- 2004: Officer as prostitute (Episode 5, not credited)
- 2004: Out of Reach as Soraya
- 2004, 2007: Kryminalni as hostess, Monika
- 2005: Pierwsza miłość as receptionist (Episode 60)
- 2005: Klinika samotnych serc as Kaja
- 2006: Serce na dłoni as Ania
- 2006: Cold Kenya as szatniarka
- 2008: The Final Wait as woman
- 2008: The Bill as Halina Lesnik
- 2008: Coming Up as mother
- 2008–09: Klan as Kaja
- 2009: Londyńczycy as hostess
- 2010: Edge as Agata
- 2010: Casualty as Vita
- From 2011: M jak miłość as Monika
- 2014: Paranoia (short film) as sister
- 2015: Bangistan as border guard at the airport
- 2016: True Crimes as interview journalist
