= Marian Małowist =

Polish historian (1909–1988)

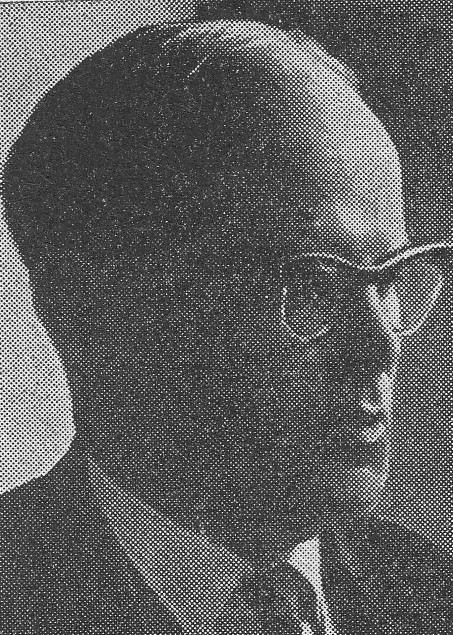
- Marian Małowist, the 1960s
- Born: 19 December 1909; Łódź
- Died: 31 August 1988 (aged 78); Warszawa
- Education: University of Warsaw
- Scientific career
- Fields: history
- Workplaces: University of Warsaw
- Thesis: (1934)
- Doctoral advisor: Marceli Handelsman

Marian Małowist (19 December 1909 – 31 August 1988) was a Polish historian, academic teacher at the Institute of History at the University of Warsaw.

== Biography ==
He was born in a Polonized Jewish family, the son of Jakub Małowist, a physician, and Rozalia née Landau. In his childhood he suffered from polio. In 1925, he joined the Communist Youth Union.

In 1927 he passed matura in the Nicolaus Copernicus State Gymnasium in Łódź. Also in 1927 he enrolled at the history studies at the University of Warsaw. During his studies he was influenced by Stefan Czarnowski and Marceli Handelsman. In 1930 he defended his master's thesis on the connections between Hanseatic cities and medieval Flanders, and in 1934 he defended his doctoral thesis Handel zagraniczny Sztokholmu i polityka zewnętrzna Szwecji w latach 1470–1503 (Stockholm's Foreign Trade and Sweden's Foreign Policy 1470–1503), written under the supervision of Marceli Handelsman.

Until the outbreak of World War II, Marian Małowist worked as a history teacher in Warsaw gimnazjums (junior high schools). At the same time, he wrote his habilitation thesis.

From the beginning of the occupation, he was involved in the underground education. In the autumn of 1941, he and his wife, psychologist Maria Frydland, moved in the Warsaw Ghetto. Marian Małowist there continued his teaching. After his wife was deported to a death camp, he managed to escape to the Aryan side. He received support from his friend Stanisław Herbst. At his urging, he decided to go to the countryside, where he taught secret classes at the secondary school level, remaining in close contact with the local command of the Peasant Battalions.

After Soviet troops liberated Poland in 1944, he reached Lublin, where he found temporary employment at the Polish Radio station. After being hit by a military vehicle and suffering serious injuries and permanent disability, thanks to the support of relatives in Stockholm, he traveled to Sweden for several months of treatment. At the same time he conducted scientific research. He returned to Warsaw and married Iza Bieżuńska-Małowist.

In 1949 he was employed as a professor at the University of Warsaw. From 1951, he was a member of the Warsaw Scientific Society. He was a member of the Marxist Association of Historians (Marksistowskie Zrzeszenie Historyków) and a member of the editorial board of “Przegląd Historyczny”. He was the organizer and from 1958 the editor-in-chief of the journal “Acta Polonia Historica” published by the Institute of History of the Polish Academy of Sciences. In the 1970s he lectured as a visiting professor in the USA. He retired in 1980.

Among his students were: Maria Bogucka, Marian Dygo, Andrzej Dziubiński, Bronisław Geremek, Rafał Karpiński, Jan Kieniewicz, Dariusz Kołodziejczyk, Marcin Kula, Tadeusz Lalik, Antoni Mączak, Danuta Molenda, Bronisław Nowak, Henryk Samsonowicz, Jan Szemiński, Stanisław Trawkowski, Michał Tymowski, Marek Urbański, Andrzej Wyrobisz and Benedykt Zientara. A book about his students, Marian Małowist i krąg jego uczniów. Z dziejów historiografii gospodarczej w Polsce, was published in 2016. He was friends with Fernand Braudel.

His remaining were buried at the Jewish Cemetery in Warsaw. His archive has been located at the PAN Archive in Warsaw.

== Works ==
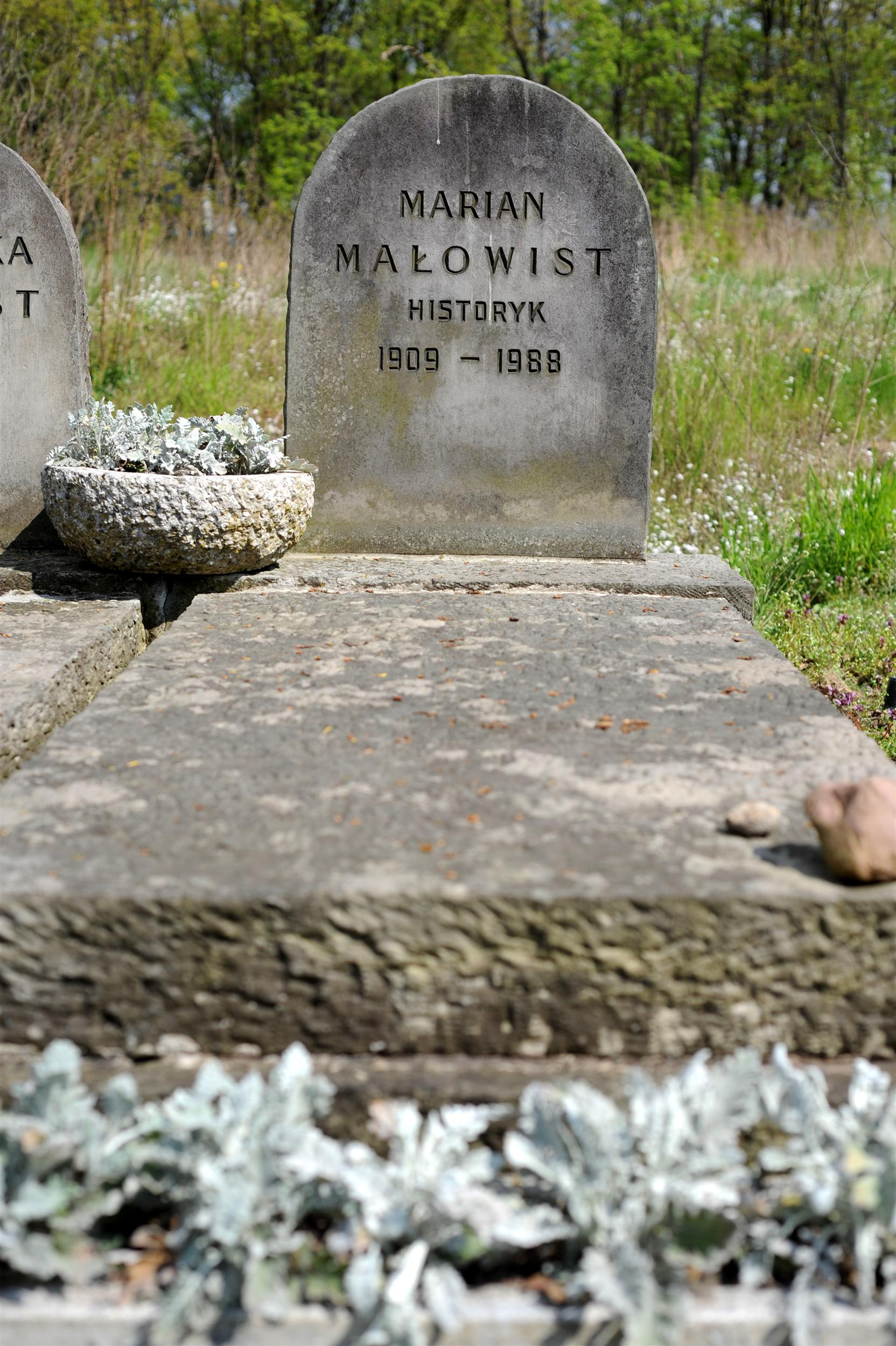
The grave of Marian Małowist at the Jewish Cemetery in Warsaw

- Kaffa w drugiej połowie XV-go wieku = Kaffa dans la deuxième moité du XV siècle, Warszawa 1939.
- Kaffa – kolonia genueńska na Krymie i problem wschodni w latach 1453–1475, Warszawa: Towarzystwo Miłośników Historii 1947.
- Rzemiosło polskie epoki Odrodzenia, Warszawa: Polska Akademia Nauk 1953 (second edition – 1954).
- Studia z dziejów rzemiosła w okresie kryzysu feudalizmu w Zachodniej Europie w XIV i XV wieku, Warszawa: Państwowe Wydawnictwo Naukowe 1954.
- Z hospodářské problematiky krise feudalismu ve XIV. a XV. století, Praga: Československá Akademie Věd. 1956.
- Wielkie państwa Sudanu Zachodniego w późnym średniowieczu, Warszawa: Państwowe Wydawwnictwo Naukowe 1964.
- Śląskie tekstylia w Zachodniej Afryce w XVI i XVII wieku, 1964.
- Ekspansja portugalska w Afryce a ekonomika Europy na przełomie XV i XVI wieku, 1968.
- Europa a Afryka Zachodnia w dobie wczesnej ekspansji kolonialnej, Warszawa: Państwowe Wydawnictwo Naukowe 1969.
- Croissance et régression en Europe XIVe-XVIIe siècles: recueil d’articles, Paris: A. Colin 1972.
- Z problematyki wzrostu gospodarczego Europy Środkowo-Wschodniej w późnym średniowieczu i na początku XVI wieku, 1973.
- Wschód a Zachód Europy w XIII–XVI wieku: konfrontacja struktur społeczno-gospodarczych, Warszawa: PWN 1973 (wyd. 2 – 2006).
- Konkwistadorzy portugalscy, Warszawa: Państwowy Instytut Wydawniczy 1976 (second edition – 1992); series: Rodowody Cywilizacji.
- Tamerlan i jego czasy, Warszawa: Państwowy Instytut Wydawniczy 1985 (second edition – 1991); series: Rodowody Cywilizacji.
- Wokół handlu lewantyńskiego w późnym średniowieczu, Warszawa: UW 1985.
- Niewolnictwo (co-author: Iza Bieżuńska-Małowist), Warszawa: Czytelnik 1987.
- Quelques aspects du commerce de l’or Soudanais au Moyen Age, Warszawa: Uniwersytet Warszawski 1988.
- Podziały gospodarcze i polityczne w Europie w średniowieczu i w dobie wczesnej nowożytności, Warszawa: Uniwersytet Warszawski 1991.
- Europa i jej ekspansja XIV–XVII wiek, Warszawa: Wydawnictwo Naukowe PWN 1993 (collection of essays).
- Western Europe, Eastern Europe and world development, 13th-18th centuries: collection of essays of Marian Małowist, ed. by Jean Batou and Henryk Szlajfer, Leiden – Boston: Brill 2010.

== Bibliography ==
- Siewierski, Tomasz (2016). Marian Małowist i krąg jego uczniów. Z dziejów historiografii gospodarczej w Polsce. Warszawa: Instytut Historii Nauki im. L. i A. Birkenmajerów PAN, Instytut Historyczny UW.
- Żywoty historyczne. Tadeusz Łepkowski, Marian Małowist, Janusz Tazbir, Aleksander Gieysztor w wywiadach z lat 1986–1989. Wydawnictwo Marek Derewiecki. 2020. ISBN 978-83-66315-21-1.
