= Stephen Báthory 2nd Secondary School (Warsaw) =

Batory High School
- II LO im. Stefana Batorego w Warszawie
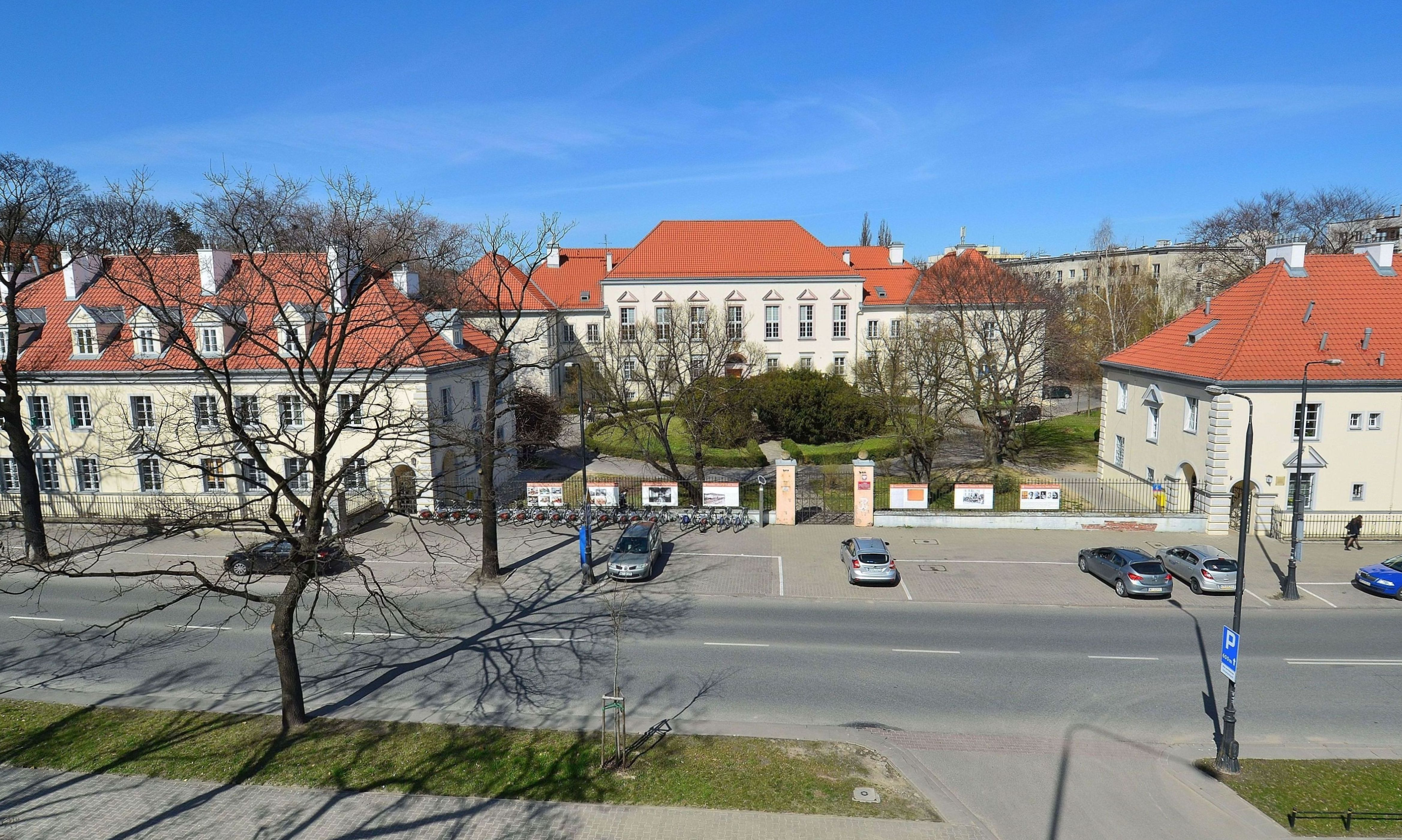

Location
- Myśliwiecka 6 Warsaw, Mazovia 00-459; Poland; 52.222°N 21.034°E

Information
- Type: Public
- Patron saint: Stephen Báthory
- Established: 1 September 1918; 108 years ago
- Founder: Antoni Ponikowski
- Principal: Barbara Kordi
- Age: 15 to 19
- Enrollment: 759
- Classes: 21
- Average class size: 33
- Language: Bilingual: Polish, English
- Newspaper: Batorak
- Website: Batory HS Website

Batory High School is a public secondary school founded on 1 September 1918 and located at 6 Myśliwiecka Street in Warsaw, Poland. Famous alumni include among others composer Witold Lutosławski and poet and Home Army soldier Krzysztof Kamil Baczyński, killed during the Warsaw Uprising.

The school offers subject-profiled classes taught both in Polish and English. Enhanced education in mathematics, physics, biology, chemistry, humanities (languages and history) and geography is provided. Since 2005, the school offers the two-year IB program intended for students aged 16–19.

== History ==
The school's history starts with the founding of the Stefan Batory Gymnasium (now called Lyceum) on 1 September 1918 with Zdzisław Rudzki as its first headmaster. It was originally located at 21 Kapucyńska Street. Construction of the current premises, the work of the eminent architect and urbanist Prof. Tadeusz Tołwiński, started in 1922 and was completed in September 1924. The school was equipped with exceptionally modern learning facilities and science labs, an astronomical observatory (now closed), an underground swimming pool, and botanical garden. The teaching staff was composed of distinguished teachers like Stanisław Młodożeńiec, Stanisław Arnold, Stanisław Malec, Gustaw Wuttke, Adam Zieleńczyk to name just a few.

At the outset of the World War II, during the German invasion of Poland in September 1939, the school served as a field hospital, supporting the nearby Ujazdów Hospital. During the German occupation of Poland (1939–1945) the school's buildings were requisitioned and hosted German primary and secondary schools. Its opening was attended by Governor General Hans Frank. Throughout the occupation period Stefan Batory Gymnasium teachers organized underground education for its students.

In the post World War II period the name of the school was changed to Stefan Batory Lyceum (full Polish name - II Liceum Ogółnokształcące im. Stefana Batorego w Warszawie).

In 1996, during a visit to Poland, the school was visited by Queen Elizabeth II and in 1997, the school was visited by Michael Jackson.

In 2017, a team from the school became the first from Poland to win a title (in the Varsity Bowl Division) in the International History Bee and Bowl European Championships, which were held in Rome that year.

In 2023, the History Bee and Bowl team won 3rd place in the International History Bee and Bowl European Championships, which were held in Barcelona.

In 2024, the History Bee and Bowl team won 1st place in the International History Bee and Bowl European Championships, which were held in London.

== Notable alumni ==
The following list is based on the list provided on the website of the school who have Wikipedia pages about them, historian and alumni information:

- Krzysztof Kamil Baczyński (1939) - poet, Home Army (Armia Krajowa) soldier
- Jan Nowak-Jeziorański - “Courier from Warsaw”, emissary of the Polish Underground State, head of Radio Free Europe's Poland section after the war
- Witold Lutosławski (1931) - composer
- Adam Glapiński - head of the National Bank of Poland since 2016
- Jan Bytnar (Rudy) (1939) - WW2 resistance hero
- Barbara Hesse-Bukowska (1948) - pianist
- Andrzej Ciechanowiecki - art historian and patron
- Marian Danysz - physicist
- Adam Galos - historian
- Jerzy Kroh - chemist
- Andrzej Łapicki - actor
- Hanna Lis - journalist
- Ewa Bem (1969) - singer
- Michał Matczak (Mata) - rapper
- Anna Mucha - actress
- Agnieszka Holland (1966) - director
- Henry Millicer - aircraft designer and pilot
- Maciej Nowicki - architect
- Daniel Olbrychski (1963) - actor
- Justyna Pochanke - journalist
- Piotr Słonimski - geneticist, pioneer of yeast mitochondrial genetics
- Witold Wincenty Staniszkis (1926) - hydro engineer, scholar, politician, father of Jadwiga Staniszkis
- Agnieszka Wagner - actress
- Vanessa Aleksander - actress
- Dorota Wellman - journalist
- Anna Wendzikowska - actress
- Tadeusz Zawadzki (Zoska) (1939) - WW2 resistance hero
