= Zientara =

Zientara is a surname. Notable people with the surname include:

- Benedykt Zientara (1928–1983), Polish historian
- Benny Zientara (1918–1985), American baseball player
- Don Zientara, American record producer and musician
- Edmund Zientara (1929–2010), Polish footballer and manager
