= Gmina Tymbark =

Gmina Tymbark Tymbark Commune
- Gmina
- Coat of arms
- Interactive map of Gmina Tymbark
- Coordinates (Tymbark): 49°44′N 20°20′E
- Country: Poland
- Voivodeship: Lesser Poland
- County: Limanowa
- Seat: Tymbark

Area
  - Total: 32.7 km^{2} (12.6 sq mi)

Population (2006)
  - Total: 6,243
  - Density: 191/km^{2} (494/sq mi)
- Website: http://www.tymbark.ug.gov.pl

Gmina Tymbark is a rural gmina (administrative district) in Limanowa County, Lesser Poland Voivodeship, in southern Poland. Its seat is the village of Tymbark, which lies approximately 8 kilometres (5 mi) north-west of Limanowa and 47 km (29 mi) south-east of the regional capital Kraków.

The gmina covers an area of 32.7 square kilometres (12.6 sq mi), and as of 2006 its total population is 6,243.

== Villages ==
Gmina Tymbark contains the villages and settlements of Piekiełko, Podłopień, Zamieście and Zawadka.

== Neighbouring gminas ==
Gmina Tymbark is bordered by the town of Limanowa and by the gminas of Dobra, Jodłownik, Limanowa and Słopnice.
