= Piekiełko, Lesser Poland Voivodeship =

Piekiełko
- Village
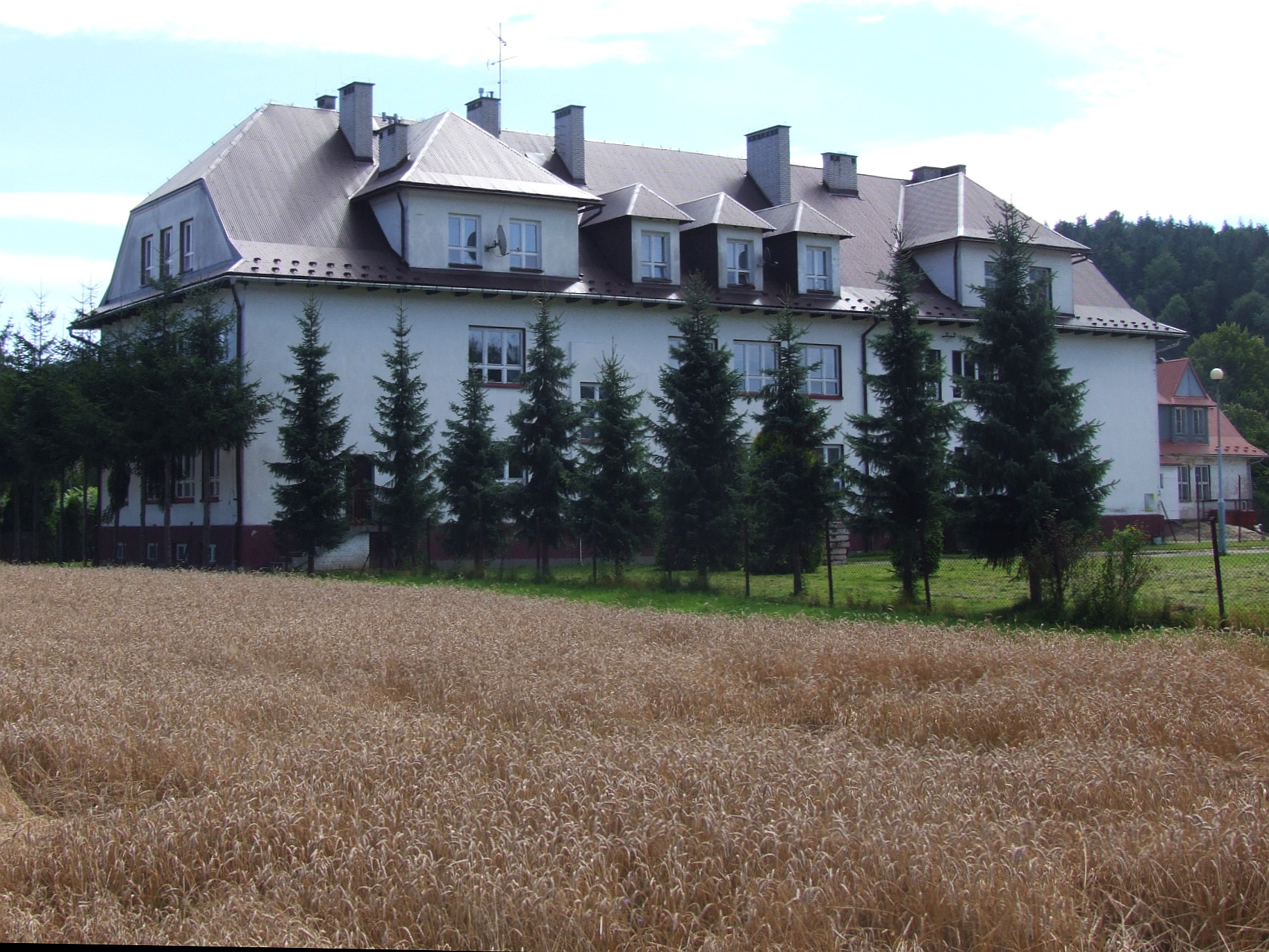
- School

- Location within Poland
- Coordinates: 49°44′55″N 20°20′37″E
- Country: Poland
- Voivodeship: Lesser Poland
- County: Limanowa
- Gmina: Tymbark

Piekiełko [pjɛˈkʲɛu̯kɔ] is a village in the administrative district of Gmina Tymbark, within Limanowa County, Lesser Poland Voivodeship, in southern Poland.
