= Zamieście, Lesser Poland Voivodeship =

Zamieście
- Village
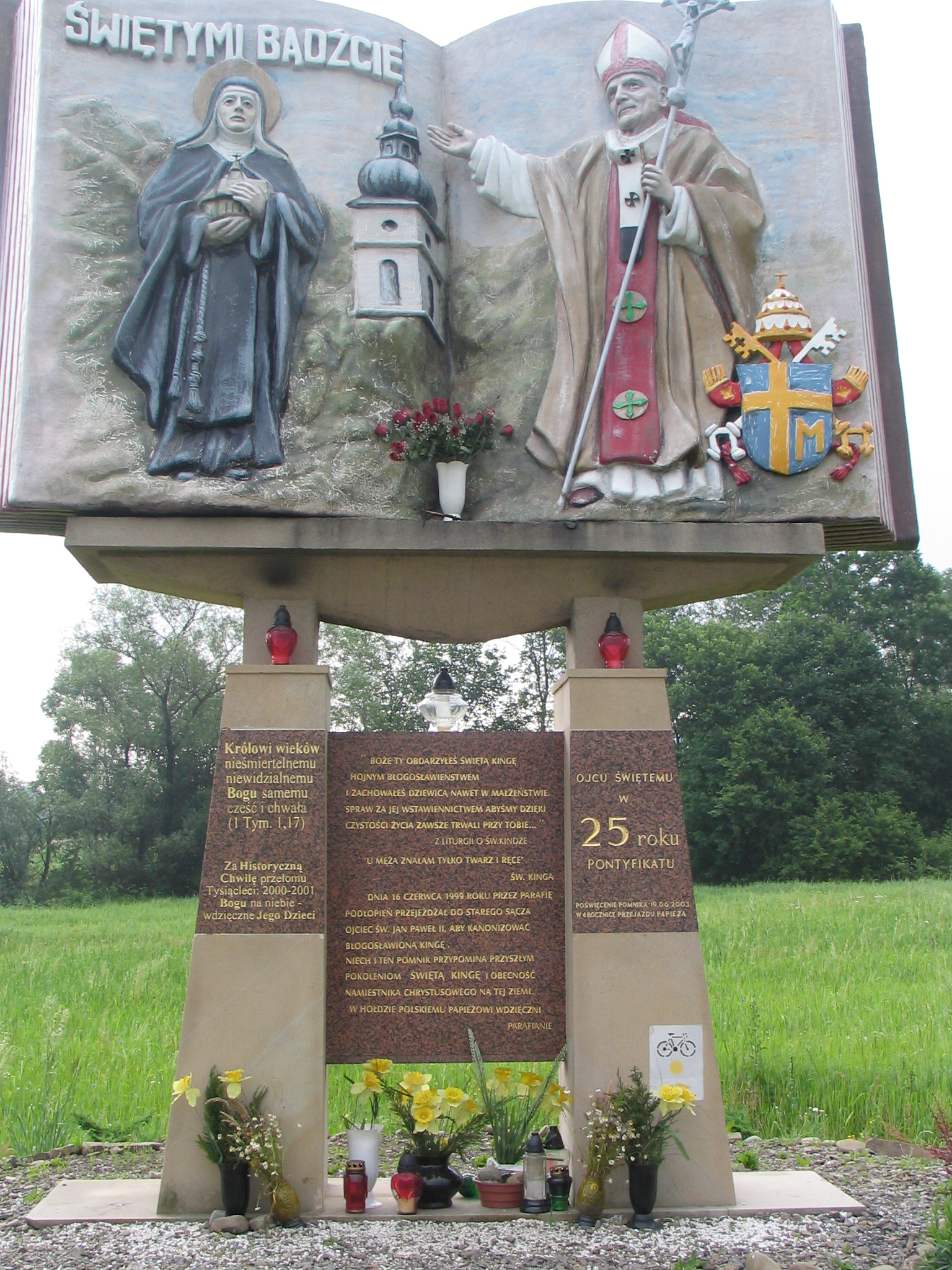
- Monument

- Location within Poland
- Coordinates: 49°44′N 20°21′E
- Country: Poland
- Voivodeship: Lesser Poland
- County: Limanowa
- Gmina: Tymbark

Zamieście [zaˈmjɛɕt͡ɕɛ] is a village in the administrative district of Gmina Tymbark, within Limanowa County, Lesser Poland Voivodeship, in southern Poland.
