= Jacek Rajchel =

Polish geologist

- Born: 30 January 1944; Chełm, Poland
- Died: 5 April 2020 (aged 76); Kraków, Poland
- Burial place: Rakowicki Cemetery, Kraków
- Education: AGH University of Krakow
- Occupations: Geologist, author, educator
- Awards: Medal of the Commission of National Education

Jacek Maria Rajchel (30 January 1944 – 5 April 2020) was a Polish geologist, author and educator who specialised in biostratigraphy, lithology and geological structure recognition of the Carpathian Mountains, and architectural applications of earth materials—especially those in the southern Polish city of Kraków, where he had lived for most of his life.

== Education and career ==
Rajchel was born in Chełm, southeastern Poland, and moved to Kraków at an early age. He graduated from Bartłomiej Nowodworski High School. From 1962 to 1968, he studied at the Faculty of Geology and Exploration at the AGH University of Krakow, specialising in earth materials. During this period, the university's geologist and archaeologist Janusz Kotlarczyk became his mentor.

Rajchel defended his doctoral thesis Geological structure of the San Valley in the Dynów-Dubiecko area (Polish: Budowa geologiczna doliny Sanu w rejonie Dynów–Dubiecko) and was awarded with the AGH rector's prize, in 1978. He acquired his habilitation on the basis of the monograph Lithostratigraphy of sediments of the upper Palecene and Eocene of the Skole Unit (Polish: Litostratygrafia osadów górnego palecenu i eocenu jednostki skolskiej) in 1991. He received his professorial nomination on 29 January 2008 and worked at the Faculty of Geology, Geophysics and Environmental Protection of the AGH University of Krakow.

Rajchel conducted stratigraphic work on Spitsbergen, the largest and the only permanently populated island of the Svalbard archipelago in northern Norway. From 1998 to 2001, he was on the board of editors of the journal Geological Review. In 2006 he became the chairman of the Commission of Geological Sciences of the Polish Academy of Sciences, Kraków Branch. He was given the Medal of the National Education Commission for his teaching activities and organisational work in the field of didactics. He has received more than a dozen awards from the rector of the AGH University for his researches, academic work and popularisation of geological knowledge. Rajchel either authored or co-authored more than two hundreds scientific publications in Polish and non-Polish journals. His 2004 nonfiction book Kamienny Kraków. Spojrzenie geologa (transl. 'Stony Kraków. Geological point of view') described the use of rock resources in Kraków in extensive detail, revealing the city's potential advantages in geotourism.

== Death ==
Rajchel died at age 76, after a battle with cancer. He was buried at Rakowicki Cemetery, a necropolis in central Kraków.
