= Podłopień =

- Village
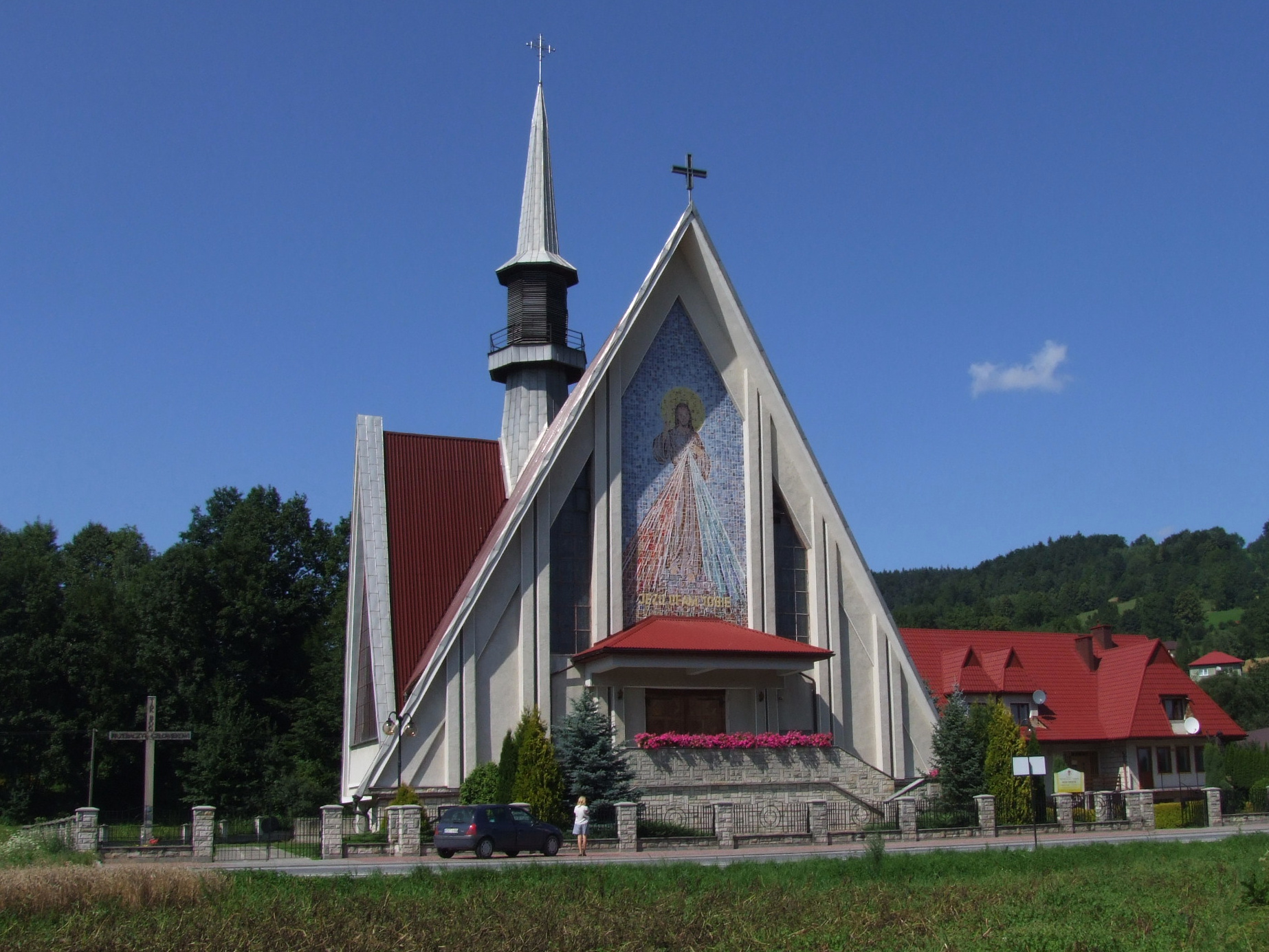
- Church

- Location within Poland
- Coordinates: 49°43′57″N 20°17′46″E
- Country: Poland
- Voivodeship: Lesser Poland
- County: Limanowa
- Gmina: Tymbark

Podłopień [pɔdˈwɔpjɛɲ] is a village in the administrative district of Gmina Tymbark, within Limanowa County, Lesser Poland Voivodeship, in southern Poland.
