= Bartłomiej Nowodoworski 1st Secondary School in Kraków =

Coordinates: 50°03′25″N 19°56′00″E

Bartłomiej Nowodoworski High School in Kraków
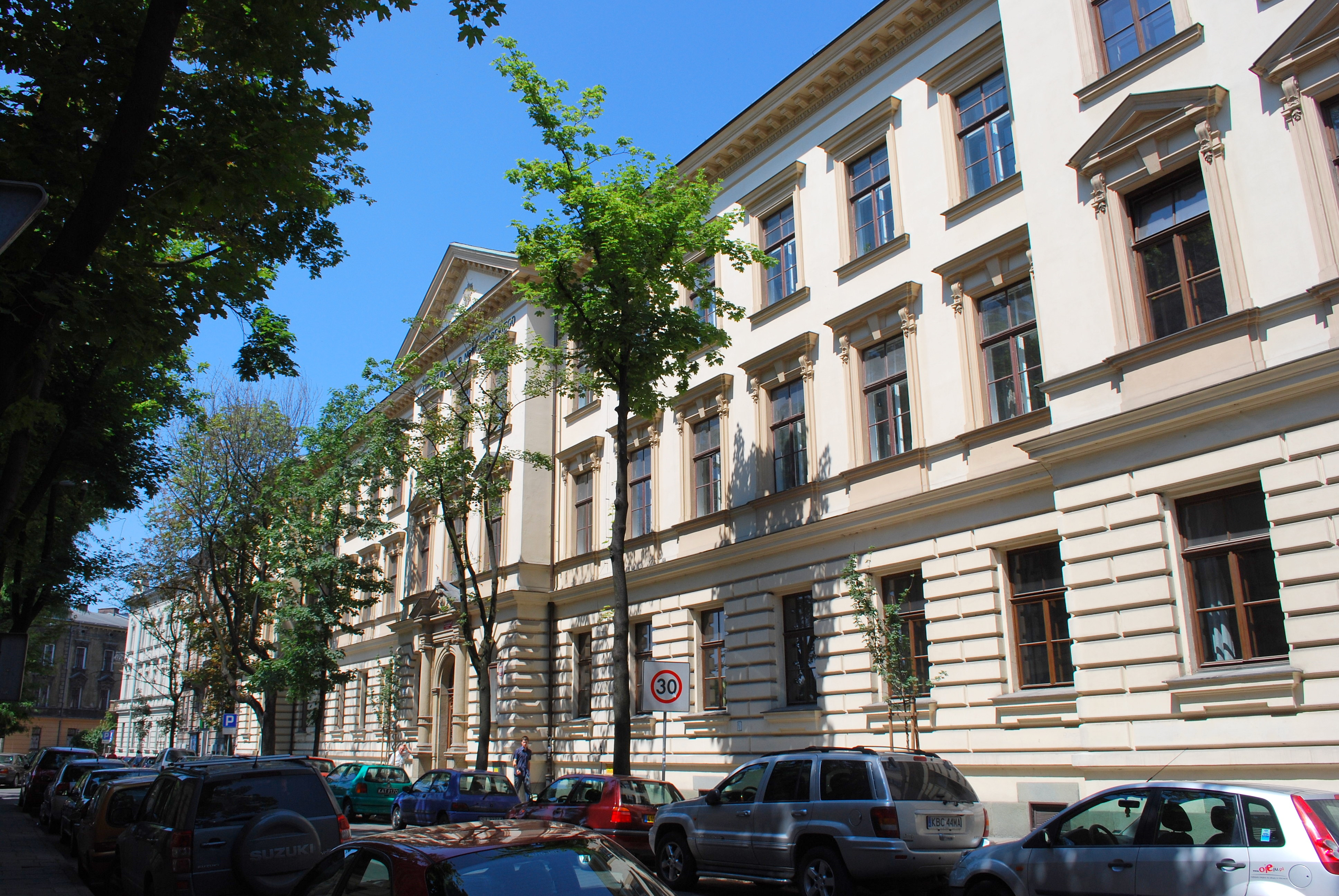
- Kraków, Małopolska; Poland

Information
- Type: Liceum ogólnokształcące
- Motto: Semper in altum (Always upwards)
- Established: 1588; 438 years ago
- Principal: Mr Jacek P. Kaczor
- Campus: Urban
- Colours: White, Blue
- Website: nowodworek.krakow.pl

Bartłomiej Nowodworski Lyceum (Polish: I Liceum Ogólnokształcące im. Bartłomieja Nowodworskiego; unofficially known as the Nowodworek) in Kraków, Poland, is one of the oldest secondary schools in Poland. Its current location is on Na Groblach Square, just across the Planty from the Kraków Old Town and a few hundred meters from Wawel Castle.

== History ==
The Senate of the Jagiellonian University decided to establish a school preparing students (boys only) for further education at the university level on 5 May 1586. The school was opened in 1588. Bartłomiej (Bartholomew) Nowodworski (born ca. 1552, died 13 February 1625), Polish nobleman, courtier and officer, endowed it in 1617 and 1619, thus enabling its further expansion. In recognition of his contribution, the school became known as Collegium Nowodworskiego, renamed to Liceum św. Anny (St. Anne's Lyceum) in 1818, and to c.k. Gimnazjum św. Anny (Imperial and Royal St. Anne's Gymnasium) in 1850. In 1898 the school, until then located in the university area, moved to its present building in Plac na Groblach (architect Józef Sare).

Henryk Sędziwy was the principal of the school between 1948 and 1971. Girls were admitted to the school for the first time in 1962.

== School's traditions ==
=== Nowodworski Choir ===
In 1986 as the 400th anniversary of the school was coming close (1988) many of the old school's traditions were reactivated. One of them was Nowodworski Choir. The first supervisor was Zbigniew Toffel, and since 1992 the conductor has been Ryszard Źróbek.

=== Nowodworski Nativity Satirical Show ===
It is an annual tradition, usually just before the Christmas break, that the pupils prepare the "Nowodworian Crib" : a Comedy show showing the school life in a satirical way. The actors parody their teachers and often some memorable school happenings; sometimes you can find allusions to the current political and cultural situation in Poland and in the World. All the students, teachers and former pupils make the audience. It was first shown in 1963, initially as a secret from the teachers, but soon became a yearly tradition looked forward to by students, as well as by teachers.

== Notable alumni ==
- Jan III Sobieski – King of Poland, military leader of European forces at the Battle of Vienna in 1683
- Stanisław Trembecki – poet of the Polish Enlightenment
- Jan Śniadecki – scientist of the Polish Enlightenment
- Jędrzej Śniadecki – chemist, doctor, biologist, philosopher
- Wojciech Bogusławski – "Father of Polish theatre"; director of the Polish National Theatre
- Józef Bem – Independence fighter, general of the Polish and Hungarian Army
- Joseph Conrad – writer; author of famous novels, such as Heart of Darkness and The Secret Agent
- Stefan Banach – mathematician (creator of functional analysis)
- Józef Kenig – journalist, publicist, editor of Gazeta Warszawska
- Władysław Ludwik Anczyc – poet, playwright
- Jan Matejko – painter of Polish historical scenes and portraits of all the Polish kings
- Józef Mehoffer – painter and decorative artist
- Stanisław Wyspiański – playwright, painter and poet
- Michał Bałucki – playwright and poet
- Kazimierz Przerwa-Tetmajer – poet, novelist
- Jacek Rajchel – geologist, author
- Lucjan Rydel – poet
- Tadeusz Boy-Żeleński – critic, journalist, Mloda Polska satirist, translator
- Ignacy Daszyński – politician, journalist and Prime Minister in 1918
- Leon Schiller – theatre and film director
- Adam Pragier - leading socialist politician, member of the Sejm, minister in exile, publicist and writer
- Jozef Retinger - linguist, geopolitician, adviser to the Polish government-in-exile, co-founder of various European institutions
- Kazimierz Nitsch – historian and linguist, professor of Jagiellonian University and Lwow University
- Juliusz Osterwa – theatre actor and director
- Gustaw Holoubek – actor and director, member of The Polish Parliament and The Senate.
- Walery Goetel – geologist and palaeontologist; researcher of geological structure of the Tatra Mountains
- Sławomir Mrożek – dramatist and writer
- Antoni Kępiński – psychiatrist; known for information metabolism and axiological psychiatry
- Michał Rola-Żymierski Marshall
- Roman Młodkowski – journalist and co-founder of Polish news television TVN24
- Wawrzyniec Styczeń – social activist, lawyer, and president of the Kraków branch of Sokół
- Jerzy Vetulani – pharmacologist and biochemist
- Andrzej Trybulec – mathematician, founder of MIZAR formalization system
- Agata Kornhauser-Duda – First Lady of Poland
- Adam Buksa - footballer, forward at New England Revolution
- Stanisław Moskal – scientist and writer
- Edmund Matejko – insurgent and teacher, older brother of the painter Jan Matejko
- Kazimierz Opałek – jurist

== See also ==
- Education
- Lyceum
- Jan III Sobieski High School in Kraków
