= Zawadka, Limanowa County =

Zawadka
- Village
- Location within Poland
- Coordinates: 49°44′17″N 20°17′19″E
- Country: Poland
- Voivodeship: Lesser Poland
- County: Limanowa
- Gmina: Tymbark

Zawadka [zaˈvatka] is a village in the administrative district of Gmina Tymbark, within Limanowa County, Lesser Poland Voivodeship, in southern Poland.
