= Artur Eisenbach =

Polish-Jewish historian (1906–1992)

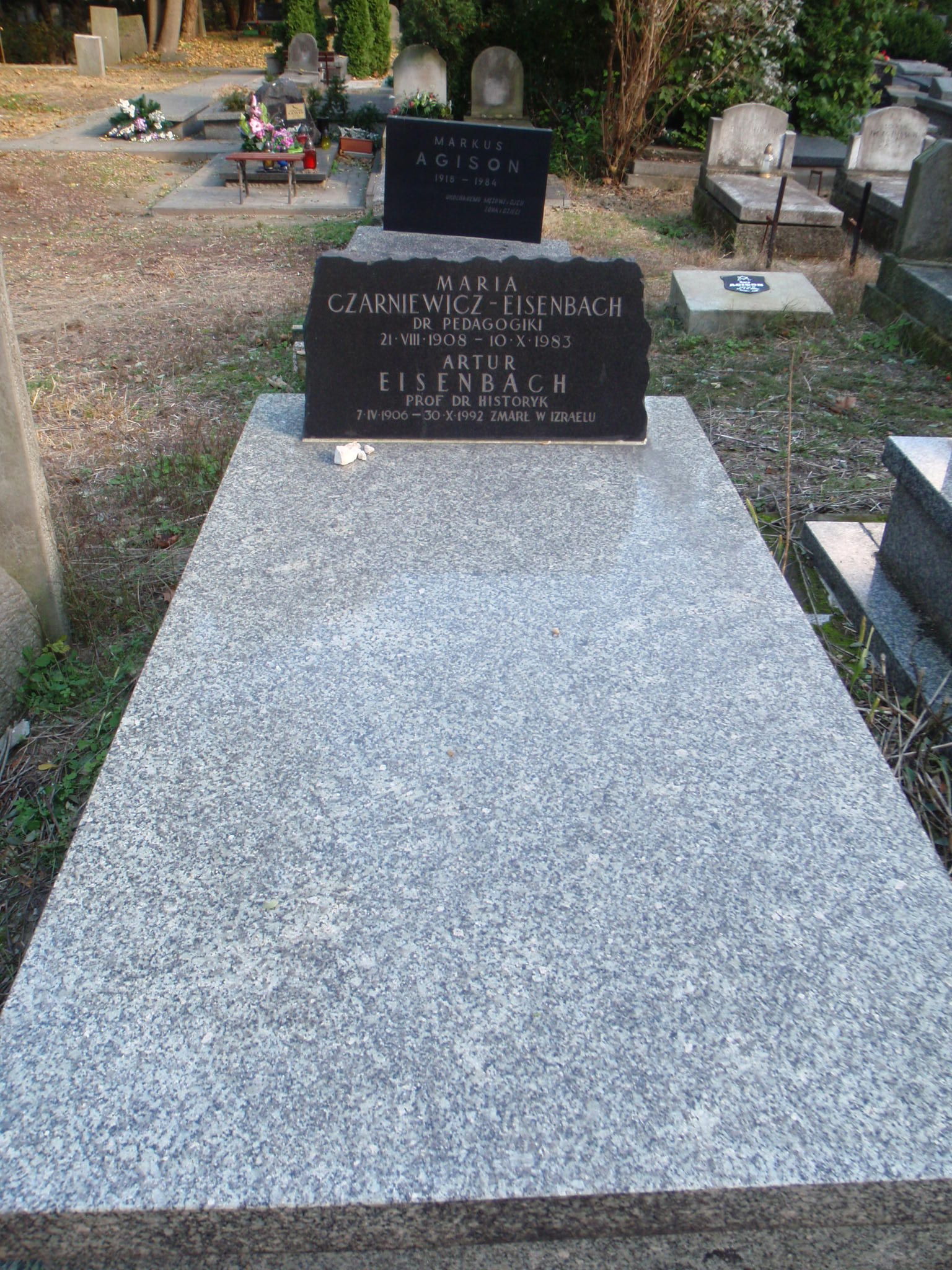
Symbolic grave of Artur Eisenbach at the resting place of Maria Czarniewicz-Eisenbach (1908–1983) in Warsaw

Artur Eisenbach (born 7 April 1906 in Nowy Sącz, died 30 October 1992 in Tel Aviv) was a Polish-Jewish historian; an expert on the history of Jews in Poland, member of Polish Academy of Sciences and the head of the Jewish Historical Institute in Warsaw between 1966 and 1968.

== Life ==
Eisenbach studied history briefly at the Jewish Educational Seminary in Vilna and then at the Warsaw University under Marceli Handelsman. Afterwards, he worked at the Society for Jewish Health Care in Poland (Towarzystwo Ochrony Zdrowia Ludności Żydowskiej w Polsce, TOZ).

He married the sister of a fellow historian, and later ghetto chronicler, Emanuel Ringelblum. After the Nazi invasion of Poland on 1 September 1939 Artur, along with his wife and child, escaped to his wife's hometown in the east, the small town of Buczacz (now Buchach, Ukraine). However, as a consequence of the Nazi-Soviet pact known as the Molotov–Ribbentrop Treaty, on 17 September the Soviet Union also invaded Poland and Buczacz fell within the Soviet occupation zone. Along with 1,200,000 other Poles, Artur Eisenbach was deported deep within the Soviet Union. His wife and daughter stayed behind. In July 1941, after the Nazi Germany attacked the Soviet Union, Buczacz was taken over by the Germans. Eisenbach's wife and daughter subsequently were murdered by the Nazis.

Eisenbach returned to Poland from the Soviet Union in 1946 and settled in Warsaw. In the same year he became the chief archivist of the Jewish Historical Institute (JHI) in Warsaw. He was a member of the PPR Polska Partia Robotnicza, the communist party in Poland from 1942 to 1948, and after 1948 member of the reconstituted PZPR (Polska Zjednoczona Partia Robotnicza). In 1966, Eisenbach became the director of the JHI and joined the Polish Academy of Sciences. In 1968, he was persecuted by the communist authorities of the People's Republic of Poland during the anti-Zionist events in the aftermath of Israel's Six Day War 1968 Polish political crisis ("the March events") and forced to resign as director JHI. Unlike many other Poles of Jewish background who left Poland after these events, Artur Eisenbach chose to remain in the country and continued his studies. Subsequently, he also wrote a series of monographs on Polish Jewish history. He was a historical consultant on film Austeria by Kawalerowicz in 1982.

Eisenbach emigrated to Israel towards the end of his life, in 1987, where he worked at the Hebrew University of Jerusalem and Yad Vashem. Facing terminal illness, he committed suicide in 1992.
