= Good Morning TVN =

Polish morning show

- Presented by: Dorota Wellman; Marcin Prokop; Paulina Krupińska - Karpiel; Damian Michałowski; Ewa Drzyzga; Krzysztof Skórzyński
- Country of origin: Poland

Production
- Producer: Ewa Baj
- Production location: TVN's studio in Warsaw
- Running time: 150 minutes

Original release
- Network: TVN (also iTVN and TVN HD)
- Release: April 21, 2005 – present

Related
- Dzień Dobry Wakacje

Dzień Dobry TVN (eng. Good Morning TVN) is a Polish morning show broadcast on TVN since 2005 every day between 7:45 and 11:30. It features celebrity guests, advice on health, entertainment, cookery and more.

It is presented by three duets: Dorota Wellman with Marcin Prokop, Paulina Krupińska-Karpiel with Damian Michałowski and Ewa Drzyzga with Krzysztof Skórzyński. The programme is also broadcast on iTVN and TVN HD.

During the summer holidays it is replaced by Dzień Dobry Wakacje

== Hosts ==
=== Daily (since Fall 2019) ===
Hosts	Period
Dorota Wellman & Marcin Prokop	Since 2019
Paulina Krupińska-Karpiel & Damian Michałowski	Since 2020
Ewa Drzyzga & Krzysztof Skórzyński	Since 2023
Sandra Hajduk-Popińska & Maciej Dowbor	Since 2024
Kinga Rusin & Piotr Kraśko	2019 - 2020
Anna Kalczyńska & Andrzej Sołtysik	2019 - 2023
Filip Chajzer & Małgorzata Ohme	2019 - 2023
Agnieszka Woźniak-Starak & Ewa Drzyzga	2020 - 2023
Małgorzata Rozenek-Majdan & Krzysztof Skórzyński	2022 - 2023
Anna Senkara & Sandra Hajduk-Popińska	2023 - 2024

=== Weekdays (Fall 2007 - Spring 2019) ===
Hosts	Period
Dorota Wellman & Marcin Prokop	2007 - 2019
Jolanta Pieńkowska & Wojciech Jagielski	2007 - 2010
Jolanta Pieńkowska & Robert Kantereit	2010 - 2014
Anna Kalczyńska & Robert Kantereit	2014 - 2015
Anna Kalczyńska & Jarosław Kuźniar	2015 - 2016
Anna Kalczyńska & Andrzej Sołtysik	2016 - 2019

==== Weekends (Fall 2005 - Spring 2019) ====
Hosts	Period
Kinga Rusin & Marcin Meller	2005 - 2008
Magda Mołek & Olivier Janiak	2005 - 2006
Magda Mołek & Jolanta Pieńkowska	2006 - 2007
Magda Mołek & Andrzej Sołtysik	2007 - 2012
Kinga Rusin & Bartosz Węglarczyk	2008 - 2016
Magda Mołek & Marcin Meller	2013 - 2019
Kinga Rusin & Piotr Kraśko	2016 -2019

== Notable moments ==
- In 2009 on the occasion of upcoming Christmas the team recorded a carol Believe In Christmas featuring a video. Due to the popularity of the song, in 2010 the carol was renewed with a new video.
- On 28 January 2020 DDTVN was accused worldwide for being unprofessional, disrespectful, racist, and xenophobic. They released material on ranging of The Most Handsome Faces of 2019, in which presenters: Anna Kalczynska-Maciejowska and Andrzej Soltysik were laughing at the appearance of the winner who is Asian. They seemed to be in disbelief that an Asian man could have won, and stated that it must have been because so many Asians voting, insinuating that was the only way an Asian man could have won. The breakfast show was highly criticised for the video during which other presenter was asking people about the winner but showing a photo of a completely different Asian man instead - essentially saying that all Asians look the same. In the video there were hateful comments like comparing the person shown to a cow because of his earrings and questioning their gender. Because of comments on social media worldwide hashtag #dziendobrytvnisoverparty started trending on Twitter.
