= Pułtusk Academy of Humanities =

Polish university

- Wyższa Szkoła Humanistyczna im. Aleksandra Gieysztora w Pułtusku
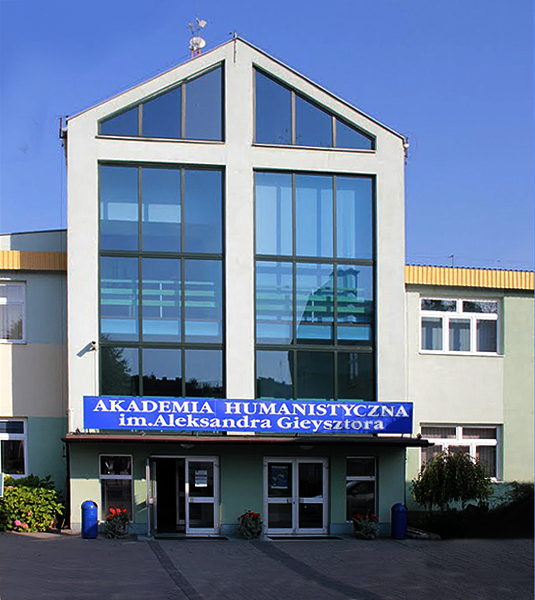
- Alexander Gieysztor Humanities Academy in Pułtusk City (June 2010)
- Type: Public
- Established: 14 July 1994
- Rector: Prof. Dr. Adam Waldemar Koseski
- Location: ul. Daszyńskiego 17, 06-100 Pułtusk, Pułtusk, Poland; 52°41′57″N 21°05′10″E
- Campus: Urban
- Website: http://www.ah.edu.pl

Aleksander Gieysztor Academy of Humanities also known as Pułtusk Academy of Humanities in Pułtusk, Poland, (Polish: Akademia Humanistyczna im. A. Gieysztora or Wyższa Szkoła Humanistyczna im. Aleksandra Gieysztora w Pułtusku) was established by the Ministry of National Education of the Republic of Poland on 14 July 1994. The School runs graduate degree programs as well as undergraduate level courses of study. The Rector of the Academy is Prof. Dr. Adam Waldemar Koseski.

It was named after its founder, Aleksander Gieysztor.

== Faculties ==
- Faculty of Administration (at 17 Daszyńskiego St.)
- Faculty of Polish Language and Literature (at 36B Mickiewicza St.)
- Faculty of History (at 36B Mickiewicza St.)
- Faculty of Political Science (at 7 Spacerowa St.)
- Faculty of Education Studies (at 36B Mickiewicza St.)
- Faculty of Sociology (at 8A Kraszewskiego St.)
- Faculty of Tourism, Hotel Management, and Environmental Promotion (at 17 Stycznia St.)

Also

- Institute of Anthropology and Archaeology (at 1/3, Polonii Ave.)
- Institute for Studies on the Napoleonic Era (at 17 Daszyńskiego St.)
- Bureau for Regional and International Cooperation (at 17 Daszyńskiego St.)
- Foreign Languages Teaching Center (at 17 Daszyńskiego St.)
- Central Library (at 36C Mickiewicza St.)

== Notes and references ==
- Pułtusk Academy of Humanities, Governance
- Pułtusk Academy of Humanities, Structure
- About the Academy
