= Tymbark =

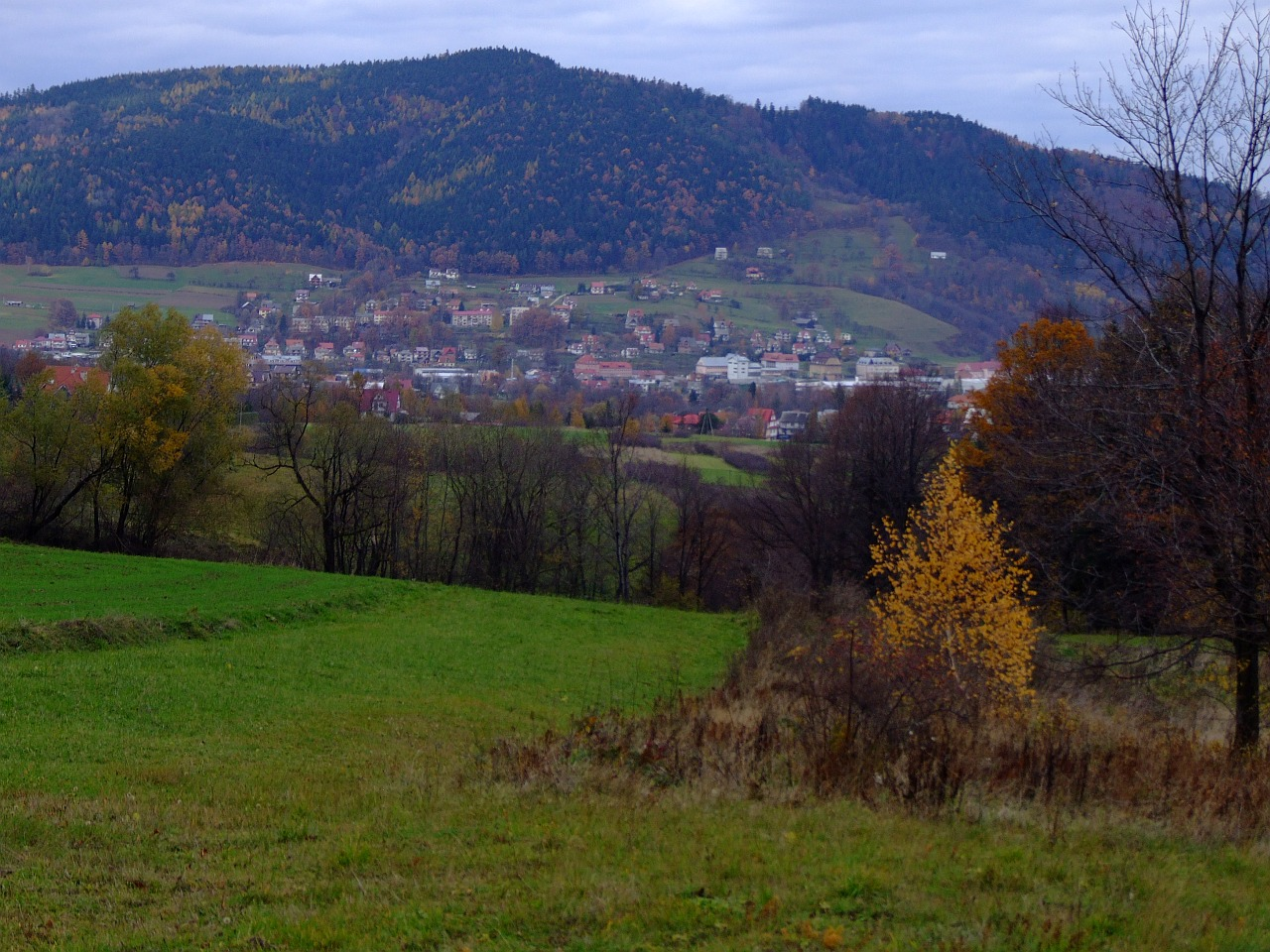
- Tymbark

- Coat of arms

- Location within Poland
- Coordinates: 49°43′38″N 20°19′32″E
- Country: Poland
- Voivodeship: Lesser Poland
- County: Limanowa
- Gmina: Tymbark
- Elevation: 427 m (1,401 ft)

Population (2004)
  - Total: 2,700
- Time zone: UTC+1 (CET)
  - Summer (DST): UTC+2 (CEST)
- Postal code: 34-650
- Area code: +48 18
- Car plates: KLI

Tymbark [ˈtɨmbark] is a village in southern Poland, some 80 km (50 mi) south-east of Kraków, population 2,400 (2004 data).

Tymbark was granted city rights in 1357 by King Casimir III of Poland. The town's original name was Jodłowa Góra (literally: firry mountain), but as the majority of first burghers came from German lands, the name was soon Germanised as Tannenberg, which gave origin to the current one, used from about the 16th century. Tymbark lost the city status in 1934; now it is the administrative centre of Gmina Tymbark.

In 1936 the Podhalańska Fruit and Vegetable Cooperative was established in Tymbark, which developed into a successful business. The cooperative was nationalised in 1950, reprivatised in 1995 and now operates as Tymbark S.A., producing fruit preserves, drinks and juices.

Tymbark is twinned with Whaley Bridge in England.
