= Benedykt Zientara =

Polish historian (1928–1983)

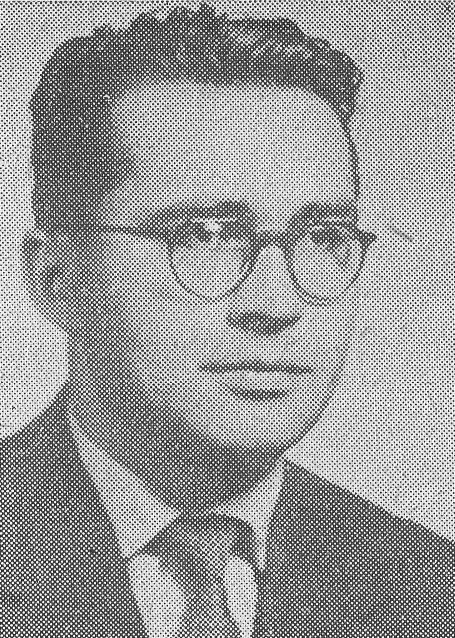
- Benedykt Zientara (1960s)
- Born: 15 June 1928; Ołtarzew
- Died: 11 May 1983 (aged 54); Warsaw
- Occupation: Historian

Academic background
- Doctoral advisor: Marian Małowist

Benedykt Zientara (15 June 1928 – 11 May 1983) was a Polish historian.

He had been working at the Warsaw University since 1950. Zientara defended his PhD thesis under supervision of Marian Małowist. In 1961 he passed his habilitation. In 1971 he gained the title of professor.

== Publications ==
- Historia powszechna średniowiecza (1968, 1973, 1994, 1996, 1998, 2000, 2002, 2006, 2008, 2015)
- Henryk Brodaty i jego czasy (1975)
- Z dziejów rzemiosła w Polsce
- Dzieje gospodarcze Polski do roku 1939
- Świt narodów europejskich: powstawanie świadomości narodowej na obszarze Europy pokarolińskiej
- Dawna Rosja: despotyzm i demokracja
- Despotyzm i tradycje demokratyczne w dawnej historii Rosji
- Dzieje małopolskiego hutnictwa żelaznego XIV – XVII wiek
