= Ewa Wipszycka =

Polish historian and papyrologist

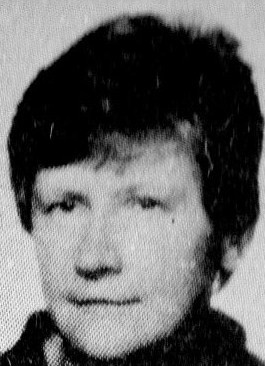
- Born: November 27, 1933 (age 92); Warsaw, Second Polish Republic
- Education: University of Warsaw
- Occupation: historian
- Known for: research on ancient history and papyrology
- Spouse: Benedetto Bravo
- Awards: Prize of the Foundation for Polish Science (2012); Order of Polonia Restituta (2003)
- Honours: Order of Polonia Restituta
- Website: Ewa Wipszycka publications on Academia.edu

Ewa Maria Wipszycka-Bravo (born 27 November 1933, Warsaw) is a Polish historian and papyrologist specializing in ancient history; a humanities professor and professor emerita at the University of Warsaw.

== Life and career ==
During her studies at the University of Warsaw (UW) she was a member of the Union of Polish Youth (Polish: Związek Młodzieży Polskiej ). She graduated in 1955, obtained her doctoral degree in 1962, and habilitation in 1972. She became a humanities professor in 1990. Between 1972 and 1990, she worked at the branch of UW in Białystok where she held the post of deputy dean (1978) and dean (1979-1981) of the Department of the Humanities.

In the years 1989-1990 she was deputy director of the Institute of History at the University of Warsaw. She also worked as deputy director of the College of the Individual Interdepartmental Studies in the Humanities (Collegium MISH) of the UW. Currently she works at the Department of Papyrology of the Institute of Archeology at the University of Warsaw.

Her scientific interests focus on the history of Egypt in the Ptolemaic Period and Late Antiquity Christianity. She is an author and co-author of numerous scientific papers, publications, popular science articles and textbooks. She conducted archeological research in a number of locations in Egypt including Alexandria, Naklun and Ptolemais.

She is the editor-in-chief of the "Journal of Juristic Papyrology" and is the co-founder of the monthly magazine "Mówią wieki". Since 2002, she has been head of the Rafał Taubenschlag Foundation. She is also a member of the Warsaw-based Collegium Invisibile.

== Awards ==
On 12 September 2003, upon the decision of the President of Poland she became the recipient of the Commander's Cross of the Order of Polonia Restituta.

In 2012, she won Poland's top science award, Prize of the Foundation for Polish Science, in the category of the humanities and social sciences for her seminal work entitled Moines et communautés monastiques en Égypte, IVe–VIIIe siecles which was recognized for its "wide-reaching reconstruction of the functioning of monastic communities in Egypt during the late antiquity".

In 2018, she was awarded an honorary doctorate at the University of Białystok for her contributions to the study of history, and in particular the history of the Christian Church in Egypt.

== Selected publications ==
- L'industrie textile dans l'Egypte romaine, Wrocław: Zakład Narodowy im. Ossolińskich 1965.
- Historia starożytnych Greków, t. 1: Do końca wojen perskich, (co-author: Benedetto Bravo), Warsaw: Państwowe Wydawnictwo Naukowe 1988.
- Kościół w świecie późnego antyku, Warsaw: Państwowy Instytut Wydawniczy 1994 (wyd. 2 Warszawa: Wydawnictwo Uniwersytetu Warszawskiego 2006).
- O starożytności polemicznie, Warsaw: "Wiedza Powszechna" 1994, wyd. 2 – 2000.
- Kościół w świecie późnego antyku, Warsaw, Wydawnictwa Uniwersytetu Warszawskiego, 2006.
- Jak kształtował się autorytet mnichów egipskich: casus kongregacji pachomiańskiej pierwszych pokoleń, Poznań: Instytut Historii UAM 2012.
- The Second Gift of the Nile, Kraków, Wydawnictwo Benedyktynów Tyniec, 2014.
- The Alexandrian Church: People and Institutions. By Ewa Wipszycka. The Journal of Juristic Papyrology: Supplement 25. Warsaw: Journal of Juristic Papyrology, 2015

== See also ==
- List of Poles
- Egyptology
