= Mieczysław Żywczyński =

Polish historian and priest

Mieczysław Żywczyński (13 January 1901 – 21 February 1978) was a Polish historian and priest. He was a professor of Catholic University of Lublin. He was a researcher of the Church's history and general history. He was born in Warsaw and died in Lublin.

== Notable works ==
- Watykan a sprawa polska w latach 1830-1837 (1935)
- Papiestwo i papieże średniowiecza (1938)
- Kościół i rewolucja francuska (1951)
- Metternich w świetle nowszej historiografii (1961)
- Historia powszechna 1789–1870 (1964)
- Włochy nowożytne 1796–1945 (1971)
- Szkice z dziejów radykalizmu chrześcijańskiego (1976)
