= Dorota Wellman =

Polish journalist (born 1961)

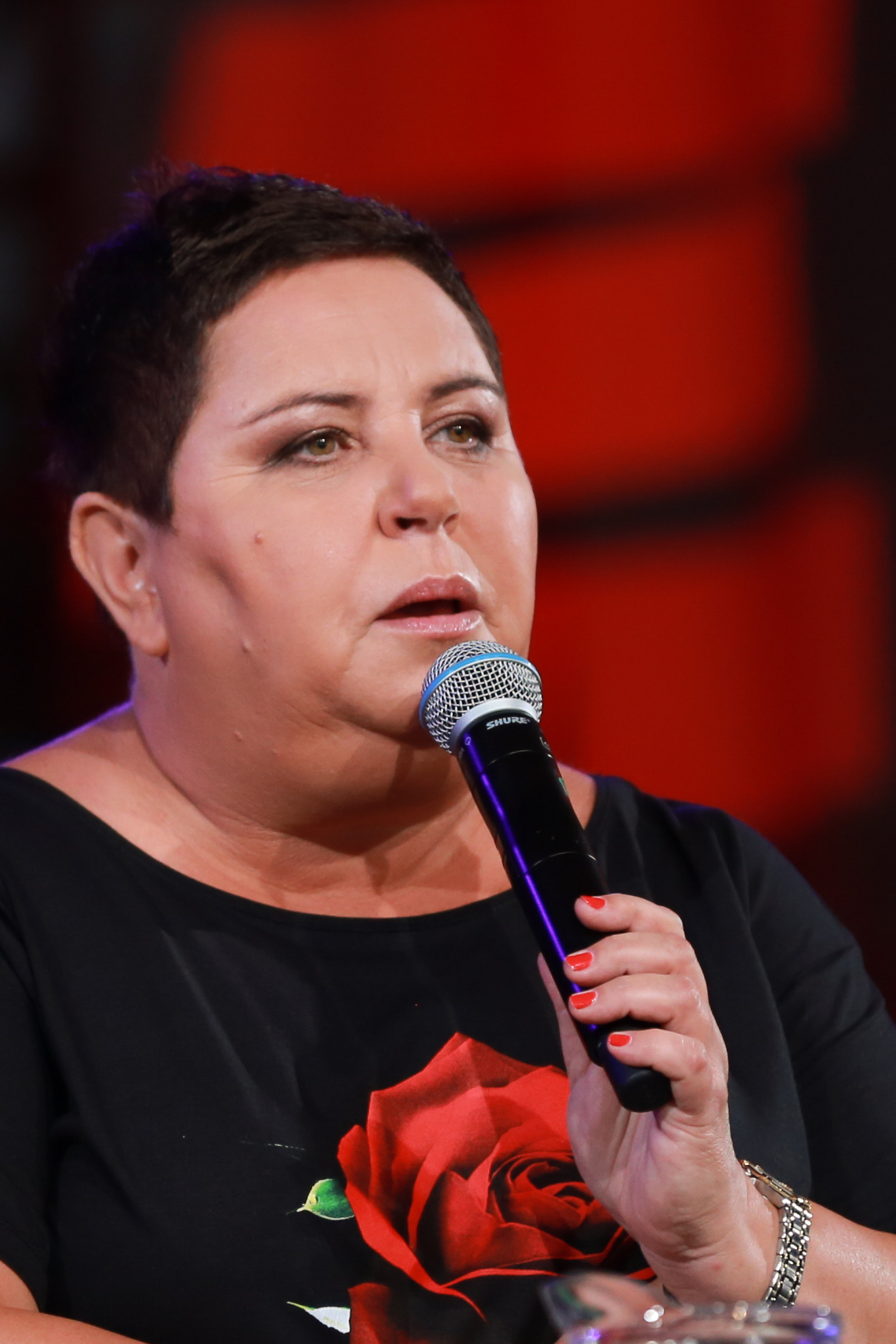
- Wellman in 2018
- Born: 2 March 1961 (age 65); Warsaw, Poland
- Education: University of Warsaw
- Occupation: Television/Radio personality
- Years active: 1980s - present
- Spouse: Krzysztof Wellman

Dorota Wellman (born 2 March 1961 in Warsaw) is a Polish journalist, television and radio personality and television producer. She graduated in Polish studies and Art history from University of Warsaw. Wellman debuted in 1980s in Solidarity Radio and later in Radio Eska. Since 2006 she is known for presenting TV programme Dzień Dobry TVN.

She portrayed Polish activist Henryka Krzywonos in Andrzej Wajda's film Walesa. Man of Hope (2013).
