= Antoni Mączak =

Polish historian (1928–2003)

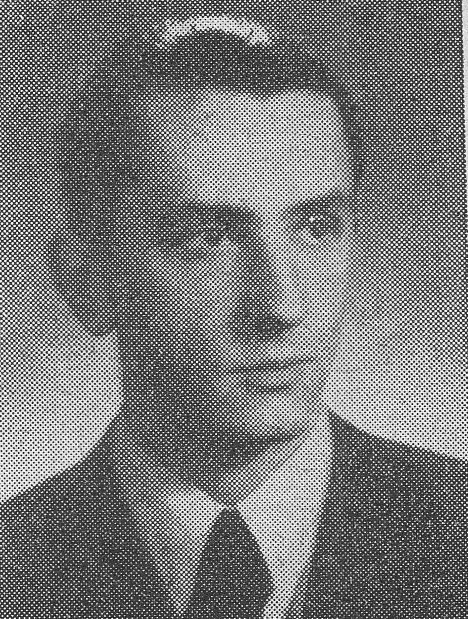
Antoni Mączak

Antoni Mączak (30 March 1928 in Lwów – 6 March 2003 in Warsaw) was a Polish historian specializing in the economic, political and social history of Poland and history of Europe.

== Biography ==
Antoni Mączak was born in Lwów in 1928 in a family with scientific and pedagogical traditions. His father was an academic teacher in Lviv and a high school principal. During the Second World War he fought in the Gray Ranks paramilitary Boy Scout units of the Polish resistance against the Nazis, and in the ranks of Home Army. He took part in the Warsaw Uprising of August–October 1944. Captured by the Nazis, he remained a prisoner until Germany surrendered in 1945. A student of Marian Małowist, in the first decades of his scientific activity he devoted himself to the study of economic history at the University of Warsaw. His doctoral dissertation concerned the cloth industry in Wielkopolska in the 17th century, and his thesis concerned the peasant economy in Żuławy Malborskie.

He was a younger friend of the "princes" of Polish history: Aleksander Gieysztor, Stefan Kieniewicz, Tadeusz Manteuffel. He advanced his scientific career with the University of Warsaw, although he also graduated from Cambridge University and lectured in the USA and Canada.

From 1981 to 1987 he was director of the History Institute of the University of Warsaw and was appointed professor there. He is a Fellow of the Collegium Invisibile, a Corresponding Member of the Polish Academy of Sciences, and a member of the Polish Academy of Sciences. He has lectured at many academic centres across the world, including at the University of Illinois at Champaign-Urbana, University of Notre Dame, McGill University.

== Works ==
Antoni Mączak has written much about economic history of Poland and on comparative history of Poland and Europe. He also wrote on the systems of authority in Europe, especially between the 15th and 18th centuries, and on the clientelism in history. His 1980s book Governing and governed (Rządzący i Rządzeni) was considered one of the most important historical texts in contemporary Poland, breaking with the past Marxist look on history that until than dominated in historiography in the People's Republic of Poland. In the English speaking world he is best known for his Travel in Early Modern Europe (Życie codzienne w podróżach po Europie XVI–XVII wieku) (translated by Ursula Phillips).
