= List of programmes broadcast by Polsat =

The list consists of major formats that were or have been produced for Polsat (Polish television channel) and aired as a premiere on this channel.

== Schedule ==
=== Fall 2025 primetime schedule ===
PM	6:45	7:00	7:15	7:30	7:45	8:00	8:15	8:30	8:45	9:00	9:15	9:30	9:45	10:00	10:15	10:30	10:45
Monday	Wydarzenia		TBA	TBA	TBA	Milionerzy		MEGAHIT (movies)									
Tuesday	Wydarzenia		TBA	TBA	TBA	Milionerzy		Ninja vs Ninja								movies / other	
Wednesday	Wydarzenia		TBA	TBA	TBA	Milionerzy		Kabaret K2. Jedziemy po bandzie					Przyjaciółki				TBA
Thursday	Wydarzenia		TBA	TBA	TBA	Milionerzy		Nasz nowy dom						TBA	TBA	TBA	TBA
Friday	Wydarzenia		TBA	TBA	TBA	Twoja twarz brzmi znajomo								Krew			
Saturday	Wydarzenia		TBA	TBA	TBA	Kabaret na żywo. Młodzi i Moralni. Nad mętną rzeką								movies / other			
Sunday	Wydarzenia		TBA	TBA	TBA	Dancing with the Stars. Taniec z gwiazdami										Teściowie	

=== Fall 2025 early fringe schedule ===
PM	2:30	2:45	3:00	3:15	3:30	3:45	4:00	4:15	4:30	4:45	5:00	5:15	5:30	5:45	6:00	6:15	6:30
Monday	Dlaczego ja?					Wydarzenia and weather forecast		Interwencja			Gliniarze				Pierwsza miłość		
Tuesday	Dlaczego ja?					Wydarzenia and weather forecast		Interwencja			Gliniarze				Pierwsza miłość		
Wednesday	Dlaczego ja?					Wydarzenia and weather forecast		Interwencja			Gliniarze				Pierwsza miłość		
Thursday	Dlaczego ja?					Wydarzenia and weather forecast		Interwencja			Gliniarze				Pierwsza miłość		
Friday	Dlaczego ja?					Wydarzenia and weather forecast		Interwencja			Gliniarze				Pierwsza miłość		
Saturday	reruns / other								Randka w ciemno (since Oct.)				Awantura o kasę				
Sunday	reruns / other								TBA	TBA	TBA	TBA	Awantura o kasę				

== List of programmes ==
Ongoing shows (as of 2024) are in bold type.

=== News / Current affairs ===
- Informacje (1993–2004) – newscast
- **Wydarzenia (since 2004) – newscast**
- **Nowy dzień (since 2008) – daily morning news program of Polsat News, also broadcast in Polsat from 6 AM to 8/9 AM**
- **Interwencja (since 2003)**
- **Państwo w państwie (since 2011) – also in Polsat News**
- **halo tu polsat (since 2024) – morning show**

=== Talk shows ===
- Co z tą Polską? (2004–2007) – political talk show by Tomasz Lis
- Kuba Wojewódzki (2002–2006, later moved to TVN)
- Na każdy temat (1993–2002)

=== Comedy ===
- **Kabaret na żywo (since 2016)**
- Piotr Bałtroczyk przedstawia (2006–2008)
  - Spadkobiercy (2008, afterwards shown as a separate series on TV4)

=== TV series ===
==== Sitcoms ====
- Daleko od noszy (2003–2009)
  - Daleko od noszy 2 (2010–2011)
  - Daleko od noszy. Szpital futpolowy (2011)
  - Daleko od noszy. Reanimacja (2017)
- Graczykowie (1999–2001)
- Graczykowie, czyli Buła i spóła (2001–2002)
- Halo Hans! (2007–2008)
- I kto tu rządzi? (2007–2008) – based on Who's the Boss?
- Kocham Klarę (2001–2002) – based on I Love Lucy
- Kowalscy kontra Kowalscy (2021–2022) – based on The Ivanovs vs. The Ivanovs
- Ludzie Chudego (2010–2011) – based on Los hombres de Paco
- Mamuśki (2007)
- Miodowe lata (1998–2003) – based on The Honeymooners
  - Całkiem nowe lata miodowe (2004)
- Rodzina zastępcza / Rodzina zastępcza plus (1999–2009)
- Szpital na perypetiach (2001–2003)
- Świat według Kiepskich (1999–2022; also in 2023 one special released online)

==== Drama ====
- 2XL (2013)
- Adam i Ewa (2000–2001)
- Hotel 52 (2010–2013)
- Klinika samotnych serc (2005)
- Pensjonat pod Różą (2004–2006)
- **Pierwsza miłość (since 2004)**
- **Przyjaciółki (since 2012)**
- Tylko miłość (2007–2009)
- Samo Życie (2002–2010)
- Sługa narodu (2023) – based on Servant of the People
- Szpilki na Giewoncie (2010–2012)

==== Crime ====
- Ekipa (2007)
- Fala zbrodni (2003–2008)
- Malanowski. Nowe rozdanie (2024; in 2025 moved to TV4) – a continuation of Malanowski i partnerzy
- Na krawędzi (2013)
- Na krawędzi 2 (2014)
- Ślad (2018–2020)

==== Pseudo-documentary ====
- **Dlaczego ja? (since 2010) – based on Verdachtsfälle**
- Dzień, który zmienił moje życie (2014–2015)
- **Gliniarze (since 2016)**
- Malanowski i partnerzy (2009–2016) – based on Lenßen & Partner
- Na ratunek 112 (since 2016–2024; in 2024 moved to TV4)
- Nieprawdopodobne, a jednak (2012)
- Pamiętniki z wakacji (2011–2013, 2016; later moved to TV4) – based on X-Diaries
- **Trudne sprawy (since 2011) – based on Familien im Brennpunkt**
- Zdrady (2013–2017, 2020; later moved to Polsat Café) – based on Cheaters

=== Reality ===
==== Game/Quiz shows ====
- **Awantura o kasę (2002–2005, since 2024) – a progenitor of the Cash Battle format**
- Chciwość, czyli żądza pieniądza (2001) – based on Greed
- Eureko, ja to wiem! (2005–2008) – based on Ahmea Kennisquiz
- Gra w ciemno (2005–2007) – a progenitor of the Clueless format
- Grasz czy nie grasz (2005–2007) – based on Deal or No Deal
- Idź na całość (1997–2001; in 2025 brought back to TTV) – based on Let's Make a Deal
- Kalambury (1995–2000) / Kalambury z gwiazdami (2013)
- **Milionerzy (since 2025; previously on TVN) – based on Who Wants to Be a Millionaire?**
- Moment prawdy (2009–2010) – based on The Moment of Truth
- Piramida (1997–2000) – based on Pyramid
- Rekiny kart (1997–1999) – based on Card Sharks
- Rosyjska ruletka (2002–2004) – based on Russian Roulette
- Strzał w 10 (2008–2009) – based on Power of 10
- Życiowa szansa (2000–2002) – based on Chance of a Lifetime

==== Talent show ====
Singing:

- Idol (2002–2005, 2017) – based on Idol
- Jak oni śpiewają (2007–2009) – based on Soapstar Superstar
- Just the Two of Us. Tylko nas dwoje (2010) – based on Just the Two of Us
- **Must Be the Music. Tylko muzyka (2011–2016, since 2025) – based on Must Be the Music**
- Śpiewajmy razem. All Together Now (2018–2019) – based on All Together Now
- The Four. Bitwa o sławę (2020) – based on The Four

Dancing:

- **Dancing with the Stars. Taniec z gwiazdami (2014–2022, since 2024; previously on TVN) – based on Dancing with the Stars**
- Got to Dance. Tylko taniec (2012–2013) – based on Got to Dance
- World of Dance Polska (2018) – based on World of Dance

Other:

- Gwiezdny cyrk (2008) – based on Celebrity Circus
- The Brain. Genialny umysł (2017) – based on The Brain
- **Twoja twarz brzmi znajomo (since 2014) – based on Your Face Sounds Familiar**

==== Competition, dating etc ====
- Bar (2002–2004) – based on The Bar
- Celebrity Splash! (2015) – based on Celebrity Splash!
- **Farma (since 2022) – based on The Farm**
- Fear Factor – Nieustraszeni (2004) – based on Fear Factor
- Hell’s Kitchen. Piekielna kuchnia (2014–2016, 2022–2023) – based on Hell's Kitchen
- Love Island. Wyspa miłości (2019–2022; later moved to TV4) – based on Love Island
- Ninja Warrior Polska / **Ninja vs Ninja** **(since 2019) – based on the Ninja Warrior / Sasuke format**
- Stand up. Zabij mnie śmiechem (2010)
- Temptation Island Polska (2023) – based on Temptation Island
- Top Chef / Top Chef. Gwiazdy od kuchni (2013–2016, 2018) – based on Top Chef
- Tylko jeden (2020)
- Wyspa przetrwania (2017) – based on Koh-Lanta (a Survivor format)

==== Other ====
- Doda. 12 kroków do miłości (2022) – based on Anna’s 12 Steps to Love
- Doda. Dream Show (2023)
- Lepiej późno niż wcale (2018) – based on Grandpas Over Flowers
- Moja mama i twój tata (2024) – based on My Mum, Your Dad
- **Nasz nowy dom (since 2013)**
- Siły specjalne Polska (2024) – based on SAS: Who Dares Wins
- The Real Housewives. Żony Warszawy (2023) – based on The Real Housewives
