= Daleko od noszy. Reanimacja =

- Promotional image
- Genre: Sitcom
- Created by: Krzysztof Jaroszyński
- Written by: Krzysztof Jaroszyński
- Directed by: Krzysztof Jaroszyński
- Country of origin: Poland
- Original language: Polish
- No. of seasons: 1
- No. of episodes: 12

Production
- Producer: Tomasz Jaskulski
- Cinematography: Paweł Banasiak
- Running time: 22 minutes
- Production companies: Polsat; TFP

Original release
- Network: Polsat
- Release: 4 March – 30 November 2017

Related
- Szpital na perypetiach (2001–2003); Off the Stretcher (2003–2009); Off the Stretcher 2 (2010–2011); Daleko od noszy. Szpital futpolowy (2011)

Daleko od noszy. Reanimacja (Note: Polish: [ˈdalɛko ˈɔt ˈnɔ.ʂɘ̟ rɛ.a.ɲiˈma.t͡sja]; lit. 'Far away from the stretcher. Resuscitation') is a Polish-language sitcom television series created, directed, and written by Krzysztof Jaroszyński, and produced by Tomasz Jaskulski, that was aired on Polsat from 4 March 2017 to 30 November 2017. It has one season, with 12 episodes in total, each with a running time of 22 minutes.

It was a continuation of the television series Daleko od noszy. Szpital futpolowy, aired in 2011, Off the Stretcher 2, aired from 2010 to 2011, Off the Stretcher, aired from 2003 to 2009, and Szpital na perypetiach, aired from 2001 to 2003.

== Premise ==
A group of medical personnel work in a regional hospital at the suburbs of Warsaw, Poland. Its previouse medical director Zygmunt Łubicz, is appointed as the Minister of Health. In his absence, one of the doctors, Roman Kidler, asks for his position at the hospital, however is rejected when it is decided that it should be given to a women. As such, he beguns to impersonate a woman medical director, unbenounced to others.

== Cast ==
- Krzysztof Kowalewski as Minister of Health Zygmunt Łubicz
- Hanna Śleszyńska as nurse Genowefa Basen
- Paweł Wawrzecki as Dr. Roman Kidler
- Katarzyna Glinka as nurse Rita Różalska
- Bogusław Kaczmarczyk as Bogumił Nowak
- Michał Lewandowski as Kuba Nowak
- Agnieszka Suchora as nurse Barbara Es
- Krzysztof Tyniec as Dr. Rudolf Wstrząs
- Piotr Gąsowski as nurse Czesław Basen
- Andrzej Nejman as Oskar Basen, Czesław's brother
- Rafał Rutkowski as Sherlock James Kraśnik
- Magdalena Mazur as nurse Magda

== Production ==
Daleko od noszy. Reanimacja was a continuation of Daleko od noszy. Szpital futpolowy, aired in 2011, Off the Stretcher 2, aired from 2010 to 2011, Off the Stretcher, aired from 2003 to 2009, and Szpital na perypetiach, aired from 2001 to 2003. It was created, directed, and written by Krzysztof Jaroszyński, and produced by Maciej Sowiński and Andrzej Papis. The cinematography was done by Paweł Banasiak, scenography by Dorota Sławecka and Maciej Fajst, and costumes by Magdalena Kowalska-Kania. It was produced by Polsat and TFP, and aired on the Polsat television channel. It has one season, with 12 episodes in total, each with a running time of 22 minutes. Its first 9 episodes were aired from 4 March to 29 April 2017. After that, it was decided to cancel the series, without airing the remaining 3 episodes that were made. The remaining episodes were later aired from 16 to 30 November 2017.
