= Daleko od noszy. Szpital futpolowy =

- Genre: Sitcom
- Created by: Krzysztof Jaroszyński
- Written by: Krzysztof Jaroszyński
- Directed by: Krzysztof Jaroszyński
- Composer: Piotr Remiszewski
- Country of origin: Poland
- Original language: Polish
- No. of seasons: 1
- No. of episodes: 12

Production
- Producer: Tomasz Jaskulski
- Cinematography: Paweł Banasiak
- Editors: Sławomir Filip; Krzysztof Janiszewski
- Running time: 22 minutes
- Production companies: Polsat; Gabi Sp zoo

Original release
- Network: Polsat
- Release: 17 September – 3 December 2011

Related
- Szpital na perypetiach (2001–2003); Off the Stretcher (2003–2009); Off the Stretcher 2 (2010–2011); Daleko od noszy. Reanimacja (2017)

Daleko od noszy. Szpital futpolowy (Note: Polish: [ˈdalɛko ˈɔt ˈnɔ.ʂɘ̟ ˈʂpi.tal fud.pɔˈlɔ.vɘ̟]; lit. 'Far away from the stretcher. Football field hospital') is a Polish-language sitcom television series created, directed, and written by Krzysztof Jaroszyński, and produced by Tomasz Jaskulski, that was aired on Polsat from 17 September to 3 December 2011. It has one season, with 12 episodes in total, each with a running time of 22 minutes.

It was a continuation of the television series Off the Stretcher 2, aired from 2010 to 2011, Off the Stretcher, aired from 2003 to 2009, and Szpital na perypetiach, aired from 2001 to 2003. The series was further continued by Daleko od noszy. Reanimacja, aired in 2017.

== Premise ==
A group of medical personnel work in a regional hospital, at the suburbs of Warsaw, Poland. The medical facility, which was for years badly managed with faulty equipment, was recently renovated and equipped with new medical devices. The hospital personnel are chosen to provide medical care, among others, to the association football players, during their matches and training for the upcoming UEFA Euro 2012 tournament. For this, they move to a field hospital set up at a nearby football stadium.

== Cast ==
- Krzysztof Kowalewski as medical director Zygmunt Łubicz
- Hanna Śleszyńska as nurse Genowefa Basen
- Paweł Wawrzecki as dr. Roman Kidler
- Piotr Gąsowski as dr. Czesław Basen
- Agnieszka Suchora as nurse Barbara Es
- Krzysztof Tyniec as dr. Rudolf Wstrząs
- Rafał Rutkowski as dr. Sherlock James Kraśnik
- Magdalena Mazur as nurse Magda
- Bogusław Kaczmarczyk as patient Bogumił Nowak
- Maciej Wierzbicki as paramedic Sławomir Słowikowski
- Joanna Koroniewska as Alicja
- Agata Załęcka as nurse Ewa
- Krzysztof Unrug as Jan Kidler vel Idzi Kulawik

== Production ==
Off the Stretcher 2 was a continuation of Off the Stretcher, aired from 2003 to 2009, and Szpital na perypetiach, aired from 2001 to 2003. It was created, directed, and written by Krzysztof Jaroszyński, and produced by Tomasz Jaskulski. The cinematography was done by Paweł Banasiak, editing by Sławomir Filip, music by Piotr Remiszewski, scenography by Maciej Fajst, and costumes by Magdalena Kowalska-Kania. Its theme song, titled "Graj w piłkę", was performed by the band Czarno-Czarni. It was produced by Polsat and Gabi Sp zoo. The series was aired on the Polsat television channel from 17 September to 3 December 2011. It has one season, with 12 episodes in total, each with a running time of 22 minutes.

== Continuation ==
The series was continued in 2017 by Daleko od noszy. Reanimacja, which has 1 season of 13 episodes.
