= Off the Stretcher 2 =

- Genre: Sitcom
- Created by: Krzysztof Jaroszyński
- Written by: Krzysztof Jaroszyński
- Directed by: Krzysztof Jaroszyński
- Composer: Piotr Remiszewski
- Country of origin: Poland
- Original language: Polish
- No. of seasons: 3
- No. of episodes: 37

Production
- Producer: Tomasz Jaskulski
- Cinematography: Paweł Banasiak
- Editors: Sławomir Filip; Krzysztof Janiszewski
- Running time: 22 minutes
- Production companies: Polsat; Gabi Sp zoo

Original release
- Network: Polsat
- Release: 13 March 2010 – 25 May 2011

Related
- Szpital na perypetiach (2001–2003); Off the Stretcher (2003–2009); Daleko od noszy. Szpital futpolowy (2011); Daleko od noszy. Reanimacja (2017)

Off the Stretcher 2 (Note: Polish: Daleko od noszy 2) is a Polish-language sitcom television series created, directed and written by Krzysztof Jaroszyński, and produced by Tomasz Jaskulski, that was aired on Polsat from 13 March 2010 to 25 May 2011. The series has 3 seasons, with a total of 37 episodes, each with a running time of 22 minutes.

It was a continuation of the television series Off the Stretcher, aired from 2003 to 2009, and Szpital na perypetiach, aired from 2001 to 2003. Sometimes its 3 seasons are considered to be an integral part of Off the Stretcher instead. The series was further continued by Daleko od noszy. Szpital futpolowy, aired in 2011, and Daleko od noszy. Reanimacja, aired in 2017.

== Premise ==
A group of medical personnel work in the Astronomer Copernicus Regional Hospital no. 1, located in suburbs of Warsaw, Poland. The medical facility, which was for years badly managed with faulty equipment, was recently renovated and equipped with new medical devices.

== Cast ==
- Krzysztof Kowalewski as medical director Marian (or Roman) Łubicz
- Hanna Śleszyńska as nurse Genowefa Basen
- Paweł Wawrzecki as dr. Roman Kidler
- Piotr Gąsowski as dr. Czesław Basen
- Anna Przybylska as dr. Karina (seasons 1–2)
- Agnieszka Suchora as nurse Barbara Es
- Krzysztof Tyniec as dr. Rudolf Wstrząs
- Rafał Rutkowski as dr. Sherlock James Kraśnik
- Magdalena Mazur as nurse Magda
- Bogusław Kaczmarczyk as patient Bogumił Nowak
- Maciej Wierzbicki as paramedic Sławomir Słowikowski
- Joanna Koroniewska as Alicja
- Agata Załęcka as nurse Ewa (season 3)
- Justyna Ekert as nurse Martyna (season 1)
- Jerzy Kryszak as businessperson Bizoń (season 1)

== Production ==
Off the Stretcher 2 was a continuation of Off the Stretcher, aired from 2003 to 2009, and Szpital na perypetiach, aired from 2001 to 2003. It was created, directed and written by Krzysztof Jaroszyński, and produced by Tomasz Jaskulski. A few episodes were also written by Maciej Kraszewski. The cinematography was done by Paweł Banasiak, editing by Sławomir Filip and Krzysztof Janiszewski, music by Piotr Remiszewski, scenography by Joanna Białousz and Maciej Fajst, and costumes by Magdalena Kowalska-Kania. It was produced by Polsat and Gabi Sp zoo. The series was aired on the Polsat television channel from 13 March 2010 to 25 May 2011. It has 3 seasons, with 37 episodes in total, each with a running time of 22 minutes.

== Continuations ==
The series was continued by Daleko od noszy. Szpital futpolowy in 2011, and Daleko od noszy. Reanimacja in 2017.
