= Off the Stretcher =

- First season DVD cover
- Genre: Sitcom
- Created by: Krzysztof Jaroszyński
- Written by: Krzysztof Jaroszyński
- Directed by: Krzysztof Jaroszyński; Tomasz Wiszniewski
- Composer: Piotr Rubik
- Country of origin: Poland
- Original language: Polish
- No. of seasons: 10
- No. of episodes: 167

Production
- Producer: Dariusz Włodarczyk
- Cinematography: Paweł Banasiak
- Editors: Sławomir Filip; Krzysztof Janiszewski
- Running time: 22 minutes
- Production companies: Polsat; Gabi Sp zoo

Original release
- Network: Polsat
- Release: 25 December 2003 – 14 January 2009

Related
- Szpital na perypetiach (2001–2003); Off the Stretcher 2 (2010–2011); Daleko od noszy. Szpital futpolowy (2011); Daleko od noszy. Reanimacja (2017)

Off the Stretcher (Polish: Daleko od noszy [ˈdalɛko ˈɔt ˈnɔ.ʂɘ̟], lit. 'Far away from the stretcher') is a Polish-language sitcom television series created by Krzysztof Jaroszyński that aired on Polsat from 25 December 2003 to 14 January 2009. It was directed by Krzysztof Jaroszyński and Tomasz Wiszniewski, written by Krzysztof Jaroszyński, and produced by Dariusz Włodarczyk. The series has 10 seasons, with a total of 167 episodes, each with a running time of 22 minutes.

It was a continuation of the television series Szpital na perypetiach, which aired from 2001 to 2003. From 2010 to 2011, a further continuation of the series titled Off the Stretcher 2 aired. Sometimes Off the Stretcher 2's 3 seasons are considered to be part of this series instead. The series was further continued by Daleko od noszy. Szpital futpolowy, aired in 2011, and Daleko od noszy. Reanimacja, aired in 2017.

== Premise ==
A group of medical personnel work in the Astronomer Copernicus Regional Hospital no. 1, located in the suburbs of Warsaw, Poland, on 19 Zdobywców Street. The medical facility is badly managed with faulty equipment, while the patients aren't receiving appropriate care.

== Cast ==
- Krzysztof Kowalewski as medical director Zygmunt (or Marian) Łubicz
- Hanna Śleszyńska as nurse Genowefa Basen
- Paweł Wawrzecki as dr. Roman Kidler
- Piotr Gąsowski as dr. Czesław Basen
- Anna Przybylska as dr. Karina (seasons 1–9)
- Agnieszka Suchora as nurse Barbara Es (seasons 2–10)
- Krzysztof Tyniec as dr. Rudolf Wstrząs (seasons 2–10)
- Magdalena Mazur as nurse Magda
- Bogusław Kaczmarczyk as patient Bogumił Nowak
- Krzysztof Prałat as intern Piotr Mrozowicz (season 1)
- Aleksandra Woźniak as intern Zuzanna (season 1)
- Violetta Kołakowska as dr. Beata (seasons 1–2, 7)
- Jerzy Turowicz as conservator Tępień (seasons 1, 6, 10)
- Sławomir Cherubiński as patient Kudłaty (season 1)
- Włodzimierz Midak as patient Szmuldziński (seasons 1–3)

== Production ==
Off the Stretcher was a continuation of Szpital na perypetiach, which was aired from 2001 to 2003. It was created by Krzysztof Jaroszyński, directed by Krzysztof Jaroszyński and Tomasz Wiszniewski, written by Krzysztof Jaroszyński, and produced by Dariusz Włodarczyk. A few episodes were also written by Maciej Kraszewski, Marcin Wolski, Marek Ławrynowicz, and Mikołaj Jaroszyński. The cinematography was done by Paweł Banasiak, editing by Sławomir Filip and Krzysztof Janiszewski, music by Piotr Remiszewski, scenography by Joanna Białousz, and costumes by Magdalena Kowalska-Kania. Its theme song, titled "Nie choruj", was performed by the band Czarno-Czarni. It was produced by Polsat and Gabi Sp zoo. The series was aired on the Polsat television channel from 25 December 2003 to 14 January 2009. It has 10 seasons, with 167 episodes in total, each with a running time of 22 minutes.

== Continuations ==
The series was continued by Off the Stretcher 2, aired from 2010 to 2011, having 3 seasons, with 10 episodes in total. Sometimes, both series are considered to be one combined show instead. In 2011 it was again continued by series Daleko od noszy. Szpital futpolowy, which has 1 season of 12 episodes. In 2017, it was continued by Daleko od noszy. Reanimacja, which has 1 season of 13 episodes.
