= Szpital na perypetiach =

- Genre: Sitcom
- Written by: Krzysztof Jaroszyński; Maciej Kraszewski
- Directed by: Krzysztof Jaroszyński; Tomasz Wiszniewski
- Starring: Krzysztof Kowalewski; Hanna Śleszyńska; Piotr Gąsowski; Paweł Wawrzecki; Aleksandra Woźniak
- Composer: Piotr Rubik
- Country of origin: Poland
- Original language: Polish
- No. of seasons: 2 + pilot season
- No. of episodes: 30

Production
- Producer: Dariusz Włodarczyk
- Cinematography: Paweł Banasiak
- Editors: Sławomir Filip (episodes 4–30); Anna Wagner (episodes 1–3); Roger Sieczkowski (episodes 1–3)
- Camera setup: Fullscreen (4:3)
- Running time: 22 minutes
- Production companies: Polsat; Gabi Sp zoo

Original release
- Network: Polsat
- Release: 5 May 2001 – 25 May 2003

Related
- Off the Stretcher (2003–2009); Off the Stretcher 2 (2010–2011); Daleko od noszy. Szpital futpolowy (2011); Daleko od noszy. Reanimacja (2017)

Szpital na perypetiach (Note: Translation from Polish: Hospital with peripeteias; the title is a pun to the series Hospital at the End of the City, which is titled in Polish as Szpital na peryferiach) is a Polish-language sitcom television series directed by Krzysztof Jaroszyński and Tomasz Wiszniewski, written by Jaroszyński and Maciej Kraszewski, and produced by Dariusz Włodarczyk. It aired on Polsat from 5 May 2001 to 25 May 2003. In total it had 30 episodes, divided into 2 full seasons, and a pilot season of 3 episodes. They had a running time of 22 minutes. It was continued with the television series Off the Stretcher, which aired from 2003 to 2009.

== Premise ==
A group of medical personnel work in the Astronomer Copernicus Regional Hospital no. 1, located in the suburbs of Warsaw, Poland. The medical facility is badly managed with faulty equipment, while the patients aren't receiving appropriate care.

== Cast ==
- Krzysztof Kowalewski as medical director Roman (or Zygmunt) Łubicz
- Hanna Śleszyńska as nurse Genowefa Basen
- Paweł Wawrzecki as dr. Lucjan Kidler
- Piotr Gąsowski as dr. Czesław Basen
- Krzysztof Prałat as intern Piotr Mrozowicz
- Aleksandra Woźniak as Zuzanna
- Violetta Kołakowska as Agnieszka
- Ewa Dałkowska as nurse Gerlach (pilot episodes)
- Katarzyna Kurylońska as nurse Cecylia Mateńko
- Andrzej Mastalerz as patient Zygmunt (or Henryk) Zawiejas (2001–2002)
- Przemysław Kaczyński as patient Zygmunt Zawiejas (2002–2003)
- Sławomir Cherubiński as patient "Kudłaty" Gronostaj
- Elżbieta Kilarska as patient Pelagia Słowikowa
- Jerzy Turowicz as conservator Tępień
- Włodzimierz Midak as patient Szmuldziński

== Production ==
The series was directed by Krzysztof Jaroszyński and Tomasz Wiszniewski, written by Jaroszyński and Maciej Kraszewski, and produced by Dariusz Włodarczyk. The cinematography was done by Paweł Banasiak, music by Piotr Rubik, and scenography by Joanna Białousz. The first three episodes were edited by Anna Wagner and Roger Sieczkowski, while the rest by Sławomir Filip. The theme song titled "To wita Cię szpital" was performed by Jacek Wójcicki. It was produced by Polsat and Gabi, and aired on Polsat television channel. The pilot season, consisting of three episodes, aired from 5 May 2001 to 19 May 2001. The first season, which consists of 14 episodes, aired from 5 October 2002 to 4 January 2003, while the second season, which consists of 13 episodes, aired from 2 March 2003 to 25 May 2003. It total, the series has 30 episodes.

== Continuations ==
Szpital na perypetiach was continued by the television series Off the Stretcher, aired from 2003 to 2009, Off the Stretcher 2, aired from 2010 to 2011, Daleko od noszy. Szpital futpolowy, aired in 2011, and Daleko od noszy. Reanimacja, aired in 2017.
