= Taniec z gwiazdami season 2 =

Taniec z gwiazdami
- Season 2
- Hosted by: Hubert Urbański; Katarzyna Skrzynecka
- Judges: Iwona Pavlović; Piotr Galiński; Beata Tyszkiewicz; Zbigniew Wodecki
- Celebrity winner: Katarzyna Cichopek
- Professional winner: Marcin Hakiel
- No. of episodes: 10

Release
- Original network: TVN
- Original release: 11 September – 4 December 2005

Season chronology
- ← Previous; Season 1 Next → Season 3

The second season of Taniec z Gwiazdami, the Polish edition of Dancing With the Stars, started on 11 September 2005 and ended on 4 December 2005. It was broadcast by TVN. Hubert Urbański and new presenter Katarzyna Skrzynecka were the hosts, and the judges were: Iwona Szymańska-Pavlović, Zbigniew Wodecki, Beata Tyszkiewicz and Piotr Galiński.

Katarzyna Cichopek and Marcin Hakiel were crowned the champions.

== Couples ==
Celebrity	Notability	Professional partner	Status
Piotr Adamski	Model and Polish plumber	Blanka Winiarska	Eliminated 1st on 18 September 2005
Hanna Śleszyńska	Film and television actress	Michał Szuba	Eliminated 2nd on 2 October 2005
Patrycja Markowska	Singer	Michał Skawiński	Eliminated 3rd on 16 October 2005
Paweł Deląg	Film and television actor	Dominika Kublik-Marzec	Eliminated 4th on 30 October 2005
Conrado Moreno	Europa da się lubić star	Magdalena Soszyńska	Eliminated 5th on 6 November 2005
Piotr Gąsowski	Actor and television presenter	Anna Głogowska	Eliminated 6th on 13 November 2005
Agnieszka Rylik	Boxer	Marcin Olszewski	Eliminated 7th on 20 November 2005
Jakub Wesołowski	Na Wspólnej actor	Edyta Herbuś	Third place on 27 November 2005
Małgorzata Foremniak	Na dobre i na złe actress	Rafał Maserak	Runners-up on 4 December 2005
Katarzyna Cichopek	M jak miłość actress	Marcin Hakiel	Winners on 4 December 2005

== Scores ==
Couple	Place	1	2	1+2	3	4	5	6	7	8	9	10
Katarzyna & Marcin	1	36†	36†	72†	36†	36†	36†	35	34	34+40=74†	35+40=75	39+39+40=118
Małgorzata & Rafał	2	29	36†	65	36†	36†	32	34	36†	37+36=73	40+39=79†	38+40+40=118
Jakub & Edyta	3	31	27	58	31	28‡	26	26‡	23‡	24+27=51‡	28+26=54‡	
Agnieszka & Marcin	4	26‡	29	55‡	26‡	31	32	33	29	31+36=67		
Piotr & Anna	5	32	33	65	29	34	34	36†	31			
Conrado & Magdalena	6	28	29	57	33	34	23‡	30				
Paweł & Dominika	7	27	33	60	34	34	29					
Patrycja & Michał	8	34	33	67	36†	33						
Hanna & Michał	9	33	28	61	29							
Piotr & Blanka	10	30	26‡	56								

Red numbers indicate the lowest score for each week.
Green numbers indicate the highest score for each week.
indicates the couple eliminated that week.
indicates the returning couple that finished in the bottom two.
indicates the winning couple of the week.
indicates the runner-up of the week.

== Average chart ==
Rank by average	Place	Team	Average	Total	Best Score	Worst Score
1.	1.	Katarzyna Cichopek & Marcin Hakiel	36.9	516	40	34
2.	2.	Małgorzata Foremniak & Rafał Maserak	36.4	509	40	29
3.	8.	Patrycja Markowska & Michał Skawiński	34	136	36	33
4.	5.	Piotr Gąsowski & Anna Głogowska	32.7	229	36	29
5.	7.	Paweł Deląg & Dominika Kublik-Marzec	31.4	157	34	27
6.	4.	Agnieszka Rylik & Marcin Olszewski	30.3	273	36	26
7.	9.	Hanna Śleszyńska & Michał Szuba	30	90	33	28
8.	6.	Conrado Moreno & Magdalena Soszyńska	29.5	177	34	23
9.	10.	Piotr Adamski & Blanka Winiarska	28	56	30	26
10.	3.	Jakub Wesołowski & Edyta Herbuś	27	297	31	23

== Average dance chart ==
Couples	Averages	Best Dances	Worst Dances
Katarzyna & Marcin	36.9	Rumba, Waltz, Freestyle (40)	Jive, Quickstep (34)
Małgorzata & Rafał	36.4	Waltz, Tango, Freestyle (40)	Cha-Cha-Cha (29)
Patrycja & Michał	34	Tango (36)	Rumba, Paso Doble (33)
Piotr & Anna	32.7	Paso Doble (36)	Jive (29)
Paweł & Dominika	31.4	Jive, Foxtrot (34)	Cha-Cha-Cha (27)
Agnieszka & Marcin	30.3	Paso Doble (36)	Waltz, Tango (26)
Hanna & Michał	30	Cha-Cha-Cha (33)	Quickstep (28)
Conrado & Magda	29.5	Paso Doble (34)	Samba (23)
Piotr & Blanka	28	Waltz (30)	Rumba (26)
Jakub & Edyta	27	Cha-Cha-Cha, Jive (31)	Tango (23)

== Highest and lowest scoring performances ==
The best and worst performances in each dance according to the judges' marks are as follows:

Dance	Best dancer	Best score	Worst dancer	Worst score
Cha-Cha-Cha	Katarzyna Cichopek	35	Paweł Deląg; Jakub Wesołowski	27
Waltz	Katarzyna Cichopek; Małgorzata Foremniak	40	Jakub Wesołowski	24
Quickstep	Małgorzata Foremniak	36	Jakub Wesołowski	26
Rumba	Katarzyna Cichopek	40	Jakub Wesołowski; Piotr Adamski	26
Jive	Małgorzata Foremniak	39	Piotr Gąsowski; Hanna Śleszyńska	29
Tango	Małgorzata Foremniak	40	Jakub Wesołowski	23
Foxtrot	Małgorzata Foremniak	36	Jakub Wesołowski	28
Paso Doble	Małgorzata Foremniak	37	Jakub Wesołowski	28
Samba	Katarzyna Cichopek	39	Conrado Moreno	23
Freestyle	Katarzyna Cichopek; Małgorzata Foremniak	40		

== Episodes ==
Individual judges scores in charts below (given in parentheses) are listed in this order from left to right: Iwona Pavlović, Zbigniew Wodecki, Beata Tyszkiewicz, Piotr Galiński.

=== Week 1 ===
Running order

Couple	Score	Style	Music
Małgorzata & Rafał	29 (7,7,9,6)	Cha-Cha-Cha	"Cuba"—Gibson Brothers
Conrado & Magdalena	28 (6,7,8,7)	Waltz	"Fascination"—David Bowie
Paweł & Dominika	27 (7,6,8,6)	Cha-Cha-Cha	"The Shoop Shoop Song"—Cher
Agnieszka & Marcin	26 (5,7,8,6)	Waltz	"Scarborough Fair"—Sarah Brightman
Hanna & Michał	33 (8,8,9,8)	Cha-Cha-Cha	"Do Wah Diddy Diddy"—Manfred Mann
Patrycja & Michał	34 (8,9,9,8)	Waltz	"When I Need You"—Leo Sayer
Jakub & Edyta	31 (7,7,9,8)	Cha-Cha-Cha	"I’m Outta Love"—Anastacia
Katarzyna & Marcin	36 (9,9,9,9)	Waltz	"Mona Lisa"—Nat King Cole
Piotr & Anna	32 (8,8,8,8)	Cha-Cha-Cha	"Twist and Shout"—The Beatles
Piotr & Blanka	30 (7,8,8,7)	Waltz	"It Is You (I Have Loved)"—Dana Glover

=== Week 2 ===
Running order

Couple	Score	Style	Music
Agnieszka & Marcin	29 (6,7,9,7)	Rumba	"Somethin' Stupid"—Robbie Williams & Nicole Kidman
Hanna & Michał	28 (6,7,8,7)	Quickstep	"When the Saints Go Marching In"—Louis Armstrong
Patrycja & Michał	33 (7,8,9,9)	Rumba	"Fields of Gold"—Sting
Jakub & Edyta	27 (6,7,9,5)	Quickstep	"Bei Mir Bistu Shein"—The Andrews Sisters
Conrado & Magdalena	29 (7,7,8,7)	Rumba	"Mañana de Carnaval"—Julio Iglesias
Paweł & Dominika	33 (8,8,9,8)	Quickstep	"Cheek to Cheek"—Fred Astaire
Piotr & Blanka	26 (7,7,7,5)	Rumba	"Mandy"—Barry Manilow
Piotr & Anna	33 (8,9,8,8)	Quickstep	"Mr. Pinstripe Suit"—Big Bad Voodoo Daddy
Katarzyna & Marcin	36 (9,9,9,9)	Rumba	"Un-Break My Heart"—Toni Braxton
Małgorzata & Rafał	36 (9,9,9,9)	Quickstep	"Nah Neh Nah"—Vaya Con Dios

=== Week 3 ===
Running order

Couple	Score	Style	Music
Hanna & Michał	29 (6,8,8,7)	Jive	"Lipstick, Powder and Paint"—Shakin' Stevens
Agnieszka & Marcin	26 (5,7,7,7)	Tango	"La cumparsita"—Gerardo Matos Rodríguez
Jakub & Edyta	31 (7,7,9,8)	Jive	"Chihuahua"—DJ Bobo
Katarzyna & Marcin	36 (9,9,9,9)	Tango	"El Choclo"—Ángel Villoldo
Piotr & Anna	29 (6,8,8,7)	Jive	"I'm So Excited"—The Pointer Sisters
Conrado & Magdalena	33 (7,8,9,9)	Tango	"Hernando's Hideaway"—Ella Fitzgerald
Paweł & Dominika	34 (8,9,9,8)	Jive	"Part-Time Lover"—Stevie Wonder
Patrycja & Michał	36 (9,9,9,9)	Tango	"Sombra"—Percy Faith
Małgorzata & Rafał	36 (9,9,9,9)	Jive	"Hafanana"—Afric Simone

=== Week 4 ===
Running order

Couple	Score	Style	Music
Katarzyna & Marcin	36 (9,9,9,9)	Paso Doble	"El Pico"—Graham Dalby & The Grahamophones
Małgorzata & Rafał	36 (9,9,9,9)	Foxtrot	"Why Don't You Do Right?"—Peggy Lee
Patrycja & Michał	33 (8,9,8,8)	Paso Doble	"Ole Espana"
Jakub & Edyta	28 (5,8,9,6)	Foxtrot	"Love and Marriage"—Frank Sinatra
Conrado & Magdalena	34 (8,8,9,9)	Paso Doble	"Baila Torrero"—Orquestra Del Tendido
Paweł & Dominika	34 (8,9,9,8)	Foxtrot	"Moondance"—Michael Bublé
Agnieszka & Marcin	31 (6,8,9,8)	Paso Doble	"Bring Me to Life"—Evanescence
Piotr & Anna	34 (7,9,9,9)	Foxtrot	"Only You (And You Alone)"—The Platters

=== Week 5 ===
Running order

Couple	Score	Style	Music
Jakub & Edyta	26 (5,7,8,6)	Samba	"Cambio Dolor"—Natalia Oreiro
Conrado & Magdalena	23 (5,7,7,4)	Samba	"Conga"—Gloria Estefan
Agnieszka & Marcin	32 (7,8,9,8)	Samba	"Moliendo Cafe"—Azúcar Moreno
Małgorzata & Rafał	32 (8,9,9,6)	Samba	"Tico Tico"—Edmundo Ros
Piotr & Anna	34 (8,9,9,8)	Samba	"All My Loving"—The Beatles
Paweł & Dominika	29 (7,8,8,6)	Samba	"Macarena"—Los Del Rio
Katarzyna & Marcin	36 (9,9,9,9)	Samba	"Stayin' Alive"—Bee Gees

=== Week 6: Movie Week ===
Running order

Couple	Score	Style	Music	Movie
Małgorzata & Rafał	34 (8,9,9,8)	Rumba	"GoldenEye"—Tina Turner	GoldenEye
Katarzyna & Marcin	35 (8,9,9,9)	Foxtrot	"Singin' in the Rain"—Gene Kelly	Singin' in the Rain
Piotr & Anna	36 (9,9,9,9)	Paso Doble	"Love Theme from The Godfather"—Nino Rota	The Godfather
Conrado & Magdalena	30 (6,8,8,8)	Foxtrot	"The Pink Panther Theme"—Henry Mancini	The Pink Panther
Agnieszka & Marcin	33 (7,9,9,8)	Quickstep	"Meet the Flintstones"—Randy Van Horne Singers	The Flintstones
Jakub & Edyta	26 (5,8,8,5)	Rumba	"My Heart Will Go On"—Celine Dion	Titanic

=== Week 7: Polish Week ===
Running order

Couple	Score	Style	Music
Piotr & Anna	31 (5,9,9,8)	Waltz	"Jej portret"—Bogusław Mec
Agnieszka & Marcin	29 (6,8,8,7)	Cha-Cha-Cha	"Na językach"—Kayah
Jakub & Edyta	23 (4,7,8,4)	Tango	"To tylko tango"—Maanam
Małgorzata & Rafał	36 (9,9,9,9)	Waltz	"Dumka na dwa serca"—Edyta Górniak & Mieczysław Szcześniak
Katarzyna & Marcin	34 (8,9,9,8)	Jive	"Dwudziestolatki"—Maciej Kossowski
Małgorzata & Rafał; Agnieszka & Marcin; Jakub & Edyta; Katarzyna & Marcin; Piotr & Anna	N/A	Group Viennese Waltz	"Noce i dnie"—Waldemar Kazanecki (from Noce i dnie)

=== Week 8: 80s Week ===
Running order

Couple	Score	Style	Music
Agnieszka & Marcin	31 (6,8,9,8)	Foxtrot	"Moon over Bourbon Street"—Sting
Agnieszka & Marcin	36 (8,9,10,9)	Paso Doble	Theme from the movie Children of Sanchez
Katarzyna & Marcin	34 (8,9,9,8)	Quickstep	"The Edge of Heaven"—Wham!
Katarzyna & Marcin	40 (10,10,10,10)	Rumba	"Wonderful Life"—Black
Małgorzata & Rafał	37 (9,9,10,9)	Paso Doble	"The Final Countdown"—Europe
Małgorzata & Rafał	36 (8,10,10,8)	Quickstep	"Cheri Cheri Lady"—Modern Talking
Jakub & Edyta	24 (4,7,9,4)	Waltz	"One More Try"—George Michael
Jakub & Edyta	27 (5,8,9,5)	Cha-Cha-Cha	"Neverending Story"—Limahl

=== Week 9: 70s Week ===
Running order

Couple	Score	Style	Music
Jakub & Edyta	28 (5,8,9,6)	Paso Doble	"Rasputin"—Boney M.
Jakub & Edyta	26 (4,8,9,5)	Quickstep	"Save Your Kisses for Me"—Brotherhood of Man
Katarzyna & Marcin	35 (8,10,9,8)	Cha-Cha-Cha	"Rivers of Babylon"—Boney M.
Katarzyna & Marcin	40 (10,10,10,10)	Waltz	"He Was Beautiful"—Cleo Laine
Małgorzata & Rafał	40 (10,10,10,10)	Tango	"Money, Money, Money"—ABBA
Małgorzata & Rafał	39 (9,10,10,10)	Jive	"Waterloo"—ABBA

=== Week 10: Final ===
Running order

Couple	Score	Style	Music
Małgorzata & Rafał	38 (9,10,10,9)	Jive	"Hafanana"—Afric Simone
Małgorzata & Rafał	40 (10,10,10,10)	Waltz	"Dumka na dwa serca"—Edyta Górniak & Mieczysław Szcześniak
Małgorzata & Rafał	40 (10,10,10,10)	Freestyle	"Free Your Mind"—En Vogue
Katarzyna & Marcin	39 (10,10,10,9)	Samba	"Stayin' Alive"—Bee Gees
Katarzyna & Marcin	39 (9,10,10,10)	Tango	"El Choclo"—Ángel Villoldo
Katarzyna & Marcin	40 (10,10,10,10)	Freestyle	"(I've Had) The Time of My Life"—Bill Medley & Jennifer Warnes

Other Dances

Couple	Style	Music
Katarzyna & Marcin; Małgorzata & Rafał; Jakub & Edyta; Agnieszka & Marcin; Piotr & Anna; Conrado & Magdalena; Paweł & Dominika; Hanna & Michał; Piotr & Blanka	Group Viennese Waltz	"Stop!"—Sam Brown (sang by Patrycja Markowska)
Olivier Janiak & Kamila Kajak (1st Edition Winner)	Waltz	Theme song from Polskie drogi
Piotr & Blanka	Rumba	"Mandy"—Barry Manilow
Hanna & Michał	Cha-Cha-Cha	"Do Wah Diddy Diddy"—Manfred Mann
Patrycja & Michał	Tango	"Sombra"—Percy Faith
Paweł & Dominika	Foxtrot	"Moondance"—Michael Bublé
Conrado & Magdalena	Paso Doble	"Baila Torrero"—Orquestra Del Tendido
Piotr & Anna	Cha-Cha-Cha	"Twist and Shout"—The Beatles
Agnieszka & Marcin	Paso Doble	"Bring Me to Life"—Evanescence
Jakub & Edyta	Tango	"To tylko tango"—Maanam

== Dances chart ==
The celebrities and professional partners danced one of these routines for each corresponding week:

- Week 1 (Season Premiere): Cha-Cha-Cha or Waltz
- Week 2: Rumba or Quickstep
- Week 3: Jive or Tango
- Week 4: Paso Doble or Foxtrot
- Week 5: Samba
- Week 6 (Movie Week): One unlearned dance
- Week 7 (Polish Week): One unlearned dance & Group Viennese Waltz
- Week 8 (80's Week): One unlearned dance & one repeated dance
- Week 9 (70's Week): One unlearned dance & one repeated dance
- Week 10 (Season Finale): Favorite Latin dance, favorite Ballroom dance & Freestyle

Team	Week 1	Week 2	Week 3	Week 4	Week 5	Week 6	Week 7		Week 8		Week 9		Week 10 Final		
Katarzyna & Marcin	Waltz	Rumba	Tango	Paso Doble	Samba	Foxtrot	Jive	Group Viennese Waltz	Quickstep	Rumba	Cha-Cha-Cha	Waltz	Samba	Tango	Freestyle
Małgorzata & Rafał	Cha-Cha-Cha	Quickstep	Jive	Foxtrot	Samba	Rumba	Waltz	Group Viennese Waltz	Paso Doble	Quickstep	Tango	Jive	Jive	Waltz	Freestyle
Jakub & Edyta	Cha-Cha-Cha	Quickstep	Jive	Foxtrot	Samba	Rumba	Tango	Group Viennese Waltz	Waltz	Cha-Cha-Cha	Paso Doble	Quickstep			Tango
Agnieszka & Marcin	Waltz	Rumba	Tango	Paso Doble	Samba	Quickstep	Cha-Cha-Cha	Group Viennese Waltz	Foxtrot	Paso Doble					Paso Doble
Piotr & Anna	Cha-Cha-Cha	Quickstep	Jive	Foxtrot	Samba	Paso Doble	Waltz	Group Viennese Waltz							Cha-Cha-Cha
Conrado & Magdalena	Waltz	Rumba	Tango	Paso Doble	Samba	Foxtrot									Paso Doble
Paweł & Dominika	Cha-Cha-Cha	Quickstep	Jive	Foxtrot	Samba										Foxtrot
Patrycja & Michał	Waltz	Rumba	Tango	Paso Doble											Tango
Hanna & Michał	Cha-Cha-Cha	Quickstep	Jive												Cha-Cha-Cha
Piotr & Blanka	Waltz	Rumba													Rumba

Highest scoring dance
Lowest scoring dance
Performed, but not scored

== Episode results ==
Order	Week 2	Week 3	Week 4	Week 5	Week 6	Week 7	Week 8	Week 9	Week 10 Final
1	Katarzyna & Marcin	Katarzyna & Marcin	Katarzyna & Marcin	Katarzyna & Marcin	Katarzyna & Marcin	Katarzyna & Marcin	Katarzyna & Marcin	Katarzyna & Marcin	Katarzyna & Marcin
2	Małgorzata & Rafał	Małgorzata & Rafał	Małgorzata & Rafał	Małgorzata & Rafał	Piotr & Anna	Małgorzata & Rafał	Małgorzata & Rafał	Małgorzata & Rafał	Małgorzata & Rafał
3	Piotr & Anna	Patrycja & Michał	Conrado & Magdalena	Piotr & Anna	Małgorzata & Rafał	Jakub & Edyta	Jakub & Edyta	Jakub & Edyta	
4	Paweł & Dominika	Jakub & Edyta	Piotr & Anna	Jakub & Edyta	Agnieszka & Marcin	Agnieszka & Marcin	Agnieszka & Marcin		
5	Hanna & Michał	Conrado & Magdalena	Jakub & Edyta	Agnieszka & Marcin	Jakub & Edyta	Piotr & Anna			
6	Conrado & Magdalena	Paweł & Dominika	Paweł & Dominika	Conrado & Magdalena	Conrado & Magdalena				
7	Patrycja & Michał	Piotr & Anna	Agnieszka & Marcin	Paweł & Dominika					
8	Jakub & Edyta	Agnieszka & Marcin	Patrycja & Michał						
9	Agnieszka & Marcin	Hanna & Michał							
10	Piotr & Blanka								

This couple came in first place with the judges.
This couple came in first place with the judges and gained the highest number of viewers' votes.
This couple gained the highest number of viewers' votes.
This couple came in last place with the judges.
This couple came in last place with the judges and was eliminated.
This couple was eliminated.
This couple won the competition.
This couple came in second in the competition.
This couple came in third in the competition.

== Audience voting results ==
Order	Week 2	Week 3	Week 4	Week 5	Week 6	Week 7	Week 8	Week 9	Week 10 Final
1	Katarzyna & Marcin	Katarzyna & Marcin	Katarzyna & Marcin	Katarzyna & Marcin	Katarzyna & Marcin	Katarzyna & Marcin	Katarzyna & Marcin	Katarzyna & Marcin	Katarzyna & Marcin
2	Jakub & Edyta	Małgorzata & Rafał	Jakub & Edyta	Jakub & Edyta	Małgorzata & Rafał	Jakub & Edyta	Jakub & Edyta	Małgorzata & Rafał	Małgorzata & Rafał
3	Małgorzata & Rafał	Jakub & Edyta	Conrado & Magdalena	Małgorzata & Rafał	Piotr & Anna	Małgorzata & Rafał	Małgorzata & Rafał	Jakub & Edyta	
4	Hanna & Michał	Conrado & Magdalena	Małgorzata & Rafał	Piotr & Anna	Agnieszka & Marcin	Agnieszka & Marcin	Agnieszka & Marcin		
5	Conrado & Magdalena	Patrycja & Michał	Agnieszka & Marcin	Conrado & Magdalena	Jakub & Edyta	Piotr & Anna			
6	Piotr & Anna	Paweł & Dominika	Piotr & Anna	Agnieszka & Marcin	Conrado & Magdalena				
7	Paweł & Dominika	Agnieszka & Marcin	Paweł & Dominika	Paweł & Dominika					
8	Agnieszka & Marcin	Piotr & Anna	Patrycja & Michał						
9	Patrycja & Michał	Hanna & Michał							
10	Piotr & Blanka								

== Guest performances ==
Episode	Date	Artist(s)	Song(s)	Dancer(s)
5	30 October 2005	Adam Sztaba's Orchestra	"Samba de Janeiro"	Katarzyna Skrzynecka, Hubert Urbański and professional dancers
5	30 October 2005	Adam Sztaba's Orchestra	"Smoke on the Water"	—
6	6 November 2005	Adam Sztaba's Orchestra	"All That Jazz"	VOLT Dance Group
6	6 November 2005	Adam Sztaba's Orchestra	"Deszcze niespokojne"	—
7	13 November 2005	Adam Sztaba's Orchestra	"Rhapsody in Red"	—
7	13 November 2005	Adam Sztaba's Orchestra	"U sza la la"	VOLT Dance Group
8	20 November 2005	Adam Sztaba's Orchestra	"Thriller"	VOLT Dance Group
9	27 November 2005	Adam Sztaba's Orchestra	"September"	VOLT Dance Group
9	27 November 2005	Adam Sztaba's Orchestra	"Don't Leave Me This Way"	—
10	4 December 2005	Adam Sztaba's Orchestra	"To ostatnia niedziela"	Marcin Olszewski & Edyta Herbuś, Michał Skawiński & Blanka Winiarska and Michał Szuba & Magdalena Soszyńska
10	4 December 2005	Adam Sztaba's Orchestra	"Z kopyta kulig rwie"	—
10	4 December 2005	Patrycja Markowska	"Stop!"	All professional dancers and celebrities

== Rating figures ==
Episode	Date	Official rating 4+	Share 4+	Share 16-39
1	11 September 2005	4 363 854	28,88%	31,77%
2	18 September 2005	4 069 941	25,71%	27,56%
3	2 October 2005	4 047 240	24,76%	25,79%
4	16 October 2005	4 158 432	24,38%	26,72%
5	30 October 2005	4 311 679	27,59%	29,73%
6	6 November 2005	4 812 545	27,94%	29,40%
7	13 November 2005	4 876 285	28,68%	30,74%
8	20 November 2005	5 650 915	33,12%	35,62%
9	27 November 2005	5 938 148	34,70%	36,10%
10	4 December 2005	7 743 241	44,15%	46,51%
Average	Season 2	5 001 238	30,19%	32,21%
