= Milionerzy =

- Created by: David Briggs; Mike Whitehill; Steven Knight
- Presented by: Hubert Urbański
- Composers: Matthew Strachan; Keith Strachan; Ramon Covalo (2008 - 2010, 2017 - 2023); Nick Magnus (2008 - 2010, 2017 - 2023)
- Country of origin: Poland
- No. of seasons: 28
- No. of episodes: 1,636

Production
- Running time: 22–44 minutes (1999–2003) approx. 44 minutes (2008–2010) approx. 22–24 minutes (2017–)
- Production companies: Endemol-Neovision (1999–2003); Sony Pictures Television (2008–) (Note: Credited as 2waytraffic until 2019.); Intergalactic (2008–2010); Jake Vision (2017–)

Original release
- Network: TVN
- Release: 3 September 1999 – 26 January 2003
- Release: 19 January 2008 – 19 December 2010
- Release: 9 February 2017 – 5 July 2025
- Network: Polsat
- Release: 1 September 2025

Hubert Urbański, the host of Milionerzy

Milionerzy (Millionaires) is a Polish game show based on the original British format of Who Wants to Be a Millionaire? The show is hosted by Hubert Urbański. The first version of Milionerzy was broadcast from 3 September 1999 to 26 January 2003, the second version was broadcast from 19 January 2008 to 19 December 2010, the third version was broadcast from 9 February 2017 to 5 July 2025, and the fourth version has been broadcast since 1 September 2025. Since September 2025, it is shown every Monday to Thursday at 7:55 p.m. (CET +1 or CEST +2) on Polsat.

In April 2025, TVN confirmed it would not extend the license to produce further seasons of the program. In June 2025, Polsat confirmed the acquisition of the rights to the format. At the same time, casting for new episodes of the program began. The new broadcaster entered into cooperation with the program's current producer, Jake Vision.

== Game rules ==
The main goal of the game is to win 1 million Polish złoty by answering twelve multiple-choice questions correctly. There are three classic lifelines – ask the audience (pytanie do publiczności), fifty fifty (pół na pół, 50:50) and phone a friend (telefon do przyjaciela) – and also three other lifelines – ask the host (pytanie do prowadzącego), ask the expert (pytanie do eksperta) (Note: The experts were: in the autumn 2009 season – Andrzej Fabianowski, Piotr Gąsowski, Michał Ogórek and Kazimiera Szczuka; in the 2010 seasons – Bartosz Węglarczyk, Michał Ogórek, Szymon Hołownia, Dorota Wellman and Jan Wróbel.) and switch the question (zamiana pytania). From March to December 2010 contestant could choose risk game, where the second guaranteed sum (40,000 zł) was not guaranteed. Since 2025, when a contestant gets the second question correct, they will leave with 2,000 zł. When a contestant gets the seventh question correct, they will leave with 50,000 zł.

== The game's prizes ==
In the first version of Milionerzy, there were fifteen questions:

Question number	Question value
1	100 zł
2	200 zł
3	300 zł
4	500 zł
5	1,000 zł
6	2,000 zł
7	4,000 zł
8	8,000 zł
9	16,000 zł
10	32,000 zł
11	64,000 zł
12	125,000 zł
13	250,000 zł
14	500,000 zł
15	1,000,000 zł

In the second and third versions of Milionerzy, there were twelve questions:

Question number	Question value (Note: Except the 2 million złoty week.)
1	500 zł
2	1,000 zł
3	2,000 zł
4	5,000 zł
5	10,000 zł
6	20,000 zł
7	40,000 zł
8	75,000 zł
9	125,000 zł
10	250,000 zł
11	500,000 zł
12	1,000,000 zł

In the fourth version of Milionerzy, the question values for the first seven questions were increased:

Question number	Question value
1	1,000 zł
2	2,000 zł
3	5,000 zł
4	10,000 zł
5	15,000 zł
6	25,000 zł
7	50,000 zł
8	75,000 zł
9	125,000 zł
10	250,000 zł
11	500,000 zł
12	1,000,000 zł

== Appearance ==
From 1999 through 2003 we could see three changes of the studio stage design, some differ in stylistics. From 2008 through 2010, after resumption we could see the fourth stage design, from 2017 through 2025, the fifth one. And after Polsat acquired the format, studio design was similar to markets like the United Kingdom, the United States, Turkey and Spain.

The first logo of Milionerzy from 1999 was very different from the standard model used in other editions of Who Wants to Be a Millionaire?. It was a violet rhombus on one of vertexes and rings standing on themselves on background of "Milionerzy" caption. (Note: First version of logo (YouTube)) The second one, modelled on the traditional style and introduced with the changes of credits and scenography in 2000, is round with green question marks. The third one, used from 2008 until 2023, had a different color scheme (question marks are gold). The fourth one, used from 2023 until now, has more golden question marks.

The first and second version of the opening credits were similar with people looking and aiming on Milionerzy logo. It was patterned on British credits of this time. From 2008 until 2023, the opening credits of the program featured an animation showing in sequence all prizes to one million złoty – it was patterned on the second British version. (Note: Second version of logo (YouTube))

From 1999 to 2003, the bar depicting the question and answer options in the game was black, in the shape of a rounded hexagon, with a light blue outline.

In 2008 the show switched to rave graphics based on the Macedonian and Danish versions: the question and answer bars were navy-blue and smaller than before. Also rave soundtrack was introducted.

In 2017 the show switched to rave graphics inspired by the 2011 graphics in the Dutch and Turkish versions. The question bar was brighter, also fonts were different. The background was not interlaced.

In 2023 the show switched to graphics inspired by the design of Olga van den Brandt and reverted to the original background music, except intro sequence. The dominant color is purple, while the question and answer bars are navy blue. First, only the question bar appears; the answer bar appears only after the host reads them. A new feature is that the colors of the logo on the big screen change at different stages of the game. In 2025 when the show moved to Polsat, the graphic was also upgraded to the third (current) version of Olga van den Brandt graphic based on the Vietnamese and Swedish versions.

== Production ==
=== Recording studio ===
The first edition was recorded in the Warsaw-based WFDiF studio, 21, Chełmska St. from 1999 until 2000 and in the TVP studio on 17, Woronicza St until 2003. In 2008 and 2009 Milionerzy was recorded in the TVP studio in Kraków, 44, Nowohucka St. In 2010, the show was recorded in Farat Film studio in Warsaw, 22, Notecka St.

From January 2017 to the end of 2018, the show was filmed at the Transcolor studio in Szeligi near Warsaw. From January 2019 to November 2020, the program was recorded in Sękocin Stary at the TVN Sceno-Kreacje studio, and in 2021–2024 again in Szeligi. In 2025, due to a change of broadcaster, the recording location was moved to the Polsat hall at Łubinova Street in Warsaw.

==== Recordings outside Poland ====
From November 2018 to February 2019, episodes for the Italian version were recorded at the TVN SCENO-KREACJE studio in Sękocin Stary near Warsaw. From 7 December 2018 to 14 March 2019, they aired in Italy on Canale 5, owned by Mediaset. Italy decided to record Millionaire in Poland due to a proposal from Sony Pictures Television, the licensor of the rights to the international format. Representatives stated that the Polish version is considered the best in the world. When agreeing to produce the show in Poland, the Italians had to provide transport to Poland for the production team, the host, and the contestants. Production and substantive support was handled by Jan Kepinski's company Jake Vision, which holds the license of the Polish version of Millionaire. Jake Vision was also responsible for finding an Italian audience in Poland, while the broadcast van was provided by TVN. On 22 and 23 May 2019, four episodes were recorded here to celebrate the 20th anniversary of the Spanish version of the show.

=== Executive producer ===
The executive producer of the program was Endemol in the first version, Intergalactic in the second version, and Jake Vision in the third version and onward.

== Way to become a contestant ==
Based on the source text.

=== 1999–2003 ===
- Stage I – to become a contestant, you had to phone a special Telemedium number, then choose date of recording of the episode, then answer a question with four variants and tell your personal details. 100 people were drawn from those who answered correctly and told the same recording date and they went to the II stage.
- Stage II – people, who were drawn, gave their telephone number, and a pollster called them in a 2-days time and asked questions, which didn't have answer variants. 20 people, who gave the most similar answers to the correct ones were going to the III stage.
- Stage III – before the recording participants had to arrange answer variants in correct order. 12 people, who did it correctly went to the IV stage. They were 10 Fastest Finger First players and two reserves. Pollster phoned them to confirm that they participate.

=== 2008–2010 ===
- Stage I – to become a contestant, you had to send a SMS with Milion text to a shown number, and then answer two questions with four answer variants sent by a SMS and to give your personal details. The first 100 people who registered, answered those 2 questions and gave their personal details, went to the second stage.
- Stage II – agent of the producer of the program phoned those 100 people. The call was recorded, about what those people were informed at the beginning of the call. Potential participant had to say about him, his hobby, job etc. Next, he had to answer several general knowledge questions, which didn't have variants. People chosen in the phone casting were informed about it in a 7-days time and invited to the studio.

=== 2017–2025 ===
- Stage I – to apply for the program, you had to complete the questionnaire available on the program's website, in which you had to provide both personal data and answers to the open-ended questions contained therein.
- Stage II – selected individuals had an interview with a program representative. This might be a face-to-face interview, by phone or Skype. During these interviews, the representative asked contestants open-ended questions without answer options.

== Broadcasting ==
Season	Broadcast time	Week days	Hours	Episode length	Picture format
1	September 1999 – May 2000	Monday, Friday	20:30	25 minutes	4:3
1	September 1999 – May 2000	Saturday, Sunday	19:30	45 minutes	4:3
1	June 2000	Monday, Wednesday, Thursday	20:30	25 minutes	4:3
1	June 2000	Saturday, Sunday	19:30	45 minutes	4:3
2	August 2000 – March 2001	Monday, Wednesday, Friday	20:30	45 minutes	4:3
2	August 2000 – March 2001	Saturday, Sunday	19:35	45 minutes	4:3
2	March–July 2001	Monday, Friday	20:50	45 minutes	4:3
2	March–July 2001	Saturday, Sunday	19:35	45 minutes	4:3
3	September–December 2001	Monday	20:50	30–35 minutes	4:3
3	September–December 2001	Saturday, Sunday	19:35	30–35 minutes	4:3
3	January–February 2002	Saturday, Sunday	20:00	30–35 minutes	4:3
3	March–May 2002	Monday	20:50	30–35 minutes	4:3
3	March–May 2002	Saturday, Sunday	19:35	30–35 minutes	4:3
3	June 2002	Saturday, Sunday	20:00	30–35 minutes	4:3
4	September–December 2002	Monday	21:20	30–35 minutes	4:3
4	September–December 2002	Sunday	20:00	30–35 minutes	4:3
4	January 2003	Sunday	20:00	30–35 minutes	4:3
5	January–June 2008	Saturday, Sunday	18:00	45 minutes	16:9
6	September–December 2008	Saturday, Sunday	18:00	45 minutes	16:9
7	March–May 2009	Saturday, Sunday	18:00	45 minutes	16:9
8	September–December 2009	Sunday	18:00	45 minutes	16:9
9	March–June 2010	Sunday	18:00	45 minutes	16:9 HD
10	September–December 2010	Sunday	18:00	45 minutes	16:9 HD
11	February–May 2017	Monday to Thursday (Note: The exceptions are the 2017 Easter episodes, which aired on Saturday and Monday at 20:00, the final episode of the 2 million złoty week, which aired on Friday at 20:00, the 2024 Easter episode, which aired on Monday at 18:00, and the 2024 fall season episodes, which aired at 20:50.)	20:55	22–25 minutes (Note: The special (charity) episodes are longer, lasting 26–50 minutes. The finale of the 2 million złoty tournament lasted 60 minutes.)	16:9 HD
12	September–December 2017	Monday to Thursday	20:55	22–25 minutes	16:9 HD
13	February–May 2018	Monday to Thursday	20:55	22–25 minutes	16:9 HD
14	September–December 2018	Monday to Thursday	20:55	22–25 minutes	16:9 HD
15	February–May 2019	Monday to Thursday	20:55	22–25 minutes	16:9 HD
16	September–December 2019	Monday to Thursday	20:55	22–25 minutes	16:9 HD
17	March 2020	Monday to Thursday	20:55	22–25 minutes	16:9 HD
18	September–December 2020	Monday to Thursday	20:55	22–25 minutes	16:9 HD
19	February–May 2021	Monday to Thursday	20:55	22–25 minutes	16:9 HD
20	September–December 2021	Monday to Thursday	20:55	22–25 minutes	16:9 HD
21	February–June 2022	Monday to Thursday	20:55	22–25 minutes	16:9 HD
22	September–December 2022	Monday to Thursday	20:55	22–25 minutes	16:9 HD
23	February–June 2023	Monday to Thursday	20:55	22–25 minutes	16:9 HD
24	September–December 2023	Monday to Thursday	20:55	22–25 minutes	16:9 HD
25	March–May 2024	Monday to Thursday	20:55	22–25 minutes	16:9 HD
26	November–December 2024	Monday to Thursday	20:55	22–25 minutes	16:9 HD
26	May–July 2025	Saturday	19:45 (Note: On 28 June and 5 July: also at 20:20.)	22–25 minutes	16:9 HD
26	May–July 2025	Sunday	19:45; 20:20	22–25 minutes	16:9 HD
27	September–November 2025	Monday to Thursday	19:55	22–25 minutes	16:9 HD
28	February–June 2026	Monday to Thursday	19:55	22–25 minutes	16:9 HD
29	September 2026 – present (Note: The broadcast date on Polsat was announced as 1 September 2026. However, the first episode of this season was released on 31 August 2026 on Polsat Box Go.)	Monday to Thursday	19:55	22–25 minutes	16:9 HD

== Number of viewers ==
Average of number of viewers from September 1999 to October 2008

The biggest number of viewers was on 5 March 2000, when a contestant won 250,000 zł for the first time in the history of the show. The number of viewers of this episode was 6.5 million people.

First episode of second version (19 January 2008) was watched by 3.5 million viewers. The biggest number of viewers in second version was on 5 April 2008, when the 1,000,000 zł question came up for the first time in the 12-question format. The episode from 6 April 2008 in which a contestant got the 500,000 zł question wrong was watched by 4.2 million viewers.

First episode of third version (9 February 2017) was watched by 3.4 million viewers.

Year/Season	Number of viewers	Ref.
1999	2.87 million	
2000	3.05 million	
2001	2.9 million	
2002	2.25 million	
2003	2.33 million	
Spring 2008	over 3 million	
Autumn 2008	2.92 million	
Spring 2009	2.32 million	
Autumn 2009	2.43 million	
Spring 2010	2.21 million	
Autumn 2010	2.65 million	
Spring 2017	2.35 million	
Autumn 2017	2.08 million	
Spring 2018	1.99 million	
Autumn 2018	2.09 million	
Spring 2019	1.98 million	
Autumn 2019	1.82 million	
Spring 2020 (Note: Not including the fourth (last) week of episodes.)	about 1.85 million	
Autumn 2020	1.56 million	
Spring 2021	1.51 million	
Autumn 2021	1.52 million	
Spring 2022 (Note: All episodes except two special episodes (14 February and 1 June).)	1.43 million	WM
Spring 2022	1.44 million	Press
Autumn 2022	1.34 million	
Spring 2023	1.28 million	
Autumn 2023	1.07 million	
Spring 2024	1.1 million	
Autumn 2024	950,000	
Spring 2025	639,000	
Autumn 2025	888,000	Press
Autumn 2025	953,000	Press
Autumn 2025	953,000	WM
Spring 2026	1.07 million	WM
Spring 2026	927,000	Press
Spring 2026	1.07 million	Press

== Milionerzy. 2 miliony ==
In June 2023, TVN announced plans to produce nine special episodes of the show under the name Milionerzy. 2 miliony (running on similar principles as the three million euro week in the German version). The top prize in the ninth episode is two million złoty – this amount is the highest (nominally, in PLN) prize offered so far in Polish game shows. The first episode of this special edition aired on 9 October 2023, and the final on 20 October.

=== Rules ===
During the first eight episodes, the contestants play in the traditional format – with twelve questions and one million złoty to win, with the difference, however, that there is a custom second milestone (introduced in the original British version in 2018; see underlined values) – before asking a question for a given stake, the host asks whether this amount – after giving a correct answer to the question – is to become the guaranteed sum; the contestant can therefore set the second milestone according to their own preferences.

Anyone who answers at least seven questions correctly advances to the final episode. The finalists once again compete in Fastest Finger First. The winner of the qualifying decides whether to keep their winnings from the qualifying episode and end their appearance in the show, or play for two million, risking to end the game with lower winnings. Before making a decision, the host informs how much of the original winnings the contestant will be able to keep regardless of the outcome of the game for two million.

Question number	Question value	
Question number	Qualifying episodes (1–8)	Final episode (9)
1	500 zł	1,000 zł
2	1,000 zł	2,000 zł
3	2,000 zł	5,000 zł
4	5,000 zł	10,000 zł
5	10,000 zł	20,000 zł
6	20,000 zł	50,000 zł
7	40,000 zł	100,000 zł
8	75,000 zł	200,000 zł
9	125,000 zł	350,000 zł
10	250,000 zł	500,000 zł
11	500,000 zł	900,000 zł
12	1,000,000 zł	2,000,000 zł

Contestants have three standard lifelines available: ask the audience, 50:50, and phone a friend.

== Special episodes ==
=== 1999–2003 ===
- In February 2001, issued the first special edition of the show. These were episodes of Valentine's Day, which was attended by couples in love.
- Between 24 and 26 December 2001 issued a charitable Millionaire edition to celebrate Christmas. The participants were eight actors that played their game in the following pairs: Renata Dancewicz & Paweł Wilczak, Edyta Olszówka & Olaf Lubaszenko, Agnieszka Warchulska & Zbigniew Zamachowski and Małgorzata Kożuchowska & Maciej Stuhr. The total amount won was the whole issue of 375,000 złoty, which is devoted to the foundation TVN Nie jesteś sam.
- The Easter episode of the show was broadcast on the turn of March and April 2002. Pairs of actors participated in the show: Artur Barciś with Cezary Żak, Katarzyna Skrzynecka with Maciej Kozłowski and Anna Przybylska with Robert Gonera. All winnings summed up were 314,000 złoty. The winnings were given to charity TVN Nie jesteś sam (You aren't alone).
- On Children's Day there were two special episodes, were shown on 1 and 2 June 2002, the prizes were given to the TVN charity. The participants were children attending primary schools. The prizes were the same as in usual episodes, but the questions were easier. Amount of money won in those episode was 64,000 złoty.
- On 29 and 30 June there were special episodes where participants were people from Polish Big Brother. Players were playing in pairs: Monika Sewioło with Piotr Gulczyński, Ilona Stachura with Arkadiusz Nowakowski, Monika Brochacka with Piotr Borucki, Agnieszka Frykowska with Łukasz Wiewiórski, Alicja Walczak with Sebastian Florek and Karolina Jakubik with Wojciech Glanc. Winnings were given to Nie jesteś sam charity.
- Latest special edition episodes of the first version of Milionerzy was shown during Christmas time in 2002. The participants were: Aleksandra Woźniak & Rafał Królikowski, Grażyna Wolszczak & Andrzej Zieliński and Joanna Brodzik & Paweł Wilczak. The total amount of money won was donated to the TVN foundation Nie jesteś sam.

Also in 2002 TVN was broadcasting series of family episodes. Teams of three people were taking part, and all had to be related. Every team had its captain. The rules were the same as in normal episodes, but the captain decided about choosing an answer after consultations with the rest of family members. After winning 32,000 złoty, one person left the team and went to the audience; after winning 125,000 złoty another person left and only one person left had to answer last three questions. The highest prize in these editions was 250,000 złoty.

=== 2008–2010 ===
- On 1 June 2008 (Children's Day) episode celebrities of Polish television were playing for money to build a cancer prevention center. The first pair of players were Piotr Gąsowski and Katarzyna Skrzynecka who won 40,000 złoty, and the second pair of players were Szymon Majewski and Ewa Drzyzga who won 125,000 złoty. Whole amount of money won was given to the Nie jesteś sam charity.
- Next episodes were broadcast on 6 and 7 December 2008. In the first episode, Kinga Rusin and Bartosz Węglarczyk won 40,000 złoty, and in the second, Renata Dancewicz and Piotr Adamczyk won 500,000 złoty. The winnings were given to Nie jesteś sam charity.
- Next episodes were broadcast on 25 and 26 December 2009. On the first day, Julia Kamińska and Filip Bobek won 40,000 złoty. On the second day, Marcin Prokop and Szymon Hołownia won 250,000 złoty. All of the winnings were given to Nie jesteś sam charity.
- In 2010, special episodes were broadcast on 12 and 19 December. In the first episode, Karolina Korwin-Piotrowska and Michał Piróg won 500,000 złoty, and on the next episode (broadcast on 19 December) they didn't answer the final question for 1 million zł. Next contestants were Anita Werner and Grzegorz Kajdanowicz – they won 40,000 złoty. Winnings were to given to Nie jesteś sam charity.

=== 2017–2025 ===
- In 2020, a special edition related with Santa Claus aired on 3 December. Winnings were given to the Nie jesteś sam charity.

== Notable contestants ==
=== First edition ===
==== 1,000,000 złoty question wrong (lost 468,000 złoty) ====
1. Filip Łapiński – 2 June 2002 (special edition with participation of children)

==== 500,000 złoty winners ====
1. Władysław Kostrzewski – 21 October 2000
2. Zbigniew Chrzanowski – 21 May 2001
3. Jerzy Mirski – 14 October 2001

==== 500,000 złoty question wrong (lost 218,000 złoty) ====
1. Leszek Musiał – 29 December 2000
2. Andrzej Bibel – 30 September 2001
3. Renata Dancewicz & Paweł Wilczak – 24 December 2001 (Celebrity Special)
4. Waldemar Myszkiewicz – 5 January 2002
5. Krzysztof Paliński – 3 March 2002
6. Ziemowit Stefański – 2 June 2002 (special edition with participation of children)

==== 250,000 złoty winners ====
1. Krzysztof Karwowski – 5 March 2000
2. Jarosław Olejnicki – 5 May 2000
3. Marek Janowski – 8 October 2000
4. Stanisław Pietrasiewicz – 17 February 2001
5. Katarzyna Dobras – 28 February 2001
6. Jerzy Zadrożny – 12 March 2001
7. Tomasz Micorek – 24 September 2001
8. Artur Wiśniewski – 16 December 2001
9. Edyta Olszówka & Olaf Lubaszenko – 25 December 2001 (Celebrity Special)
10. Szczepan Gardecki – 9 February 2002
11. Gogoł family – 23 September 2002 (Family Special)
12. Aleksandra Woźniak & Rafał Królikowski – 25 December 2002 (Celebrity Special)

==== 250,000 złoty question wrong (lost 93,000 złoty) ====
1. Bogumił Szmit – 26 May 2000
2. Adam Lubaszka – 3 June 2000
3. Michał Siwicki – 11 September 2000
4. Adam Bielski – 12 February 2001
5. Jacek Kobus – 17 March 2001
6. Piotr Kawecki – 26 November 2001
7. Jerzy Kostaniak – 8 April 2002
8. Bartosz Stępień – 3 November 2002

==== 125,000 złoty winners ====
1. Andrzej Zubala – 17 September 1999
2. Bogdan Rzepka – 24 September 1999
3. Barbara Płachta – 27 November 1999
4. Katarzyna Niziałek – 31 December 1999
5. Grażyna Tomaszewska – 3 January 2000
6. Maciej Kondratowicz – 12 March 2000
7. Paweł Wasilewski – 18 March 2000
8. Alfred Znamierowski – 16 April 2000
9. Marzena Bralska – 29 April 2000
10. Łukasz Kaźmierczak – 30 April 2000
11. Ryszard Ćwirta – 14 May 2000
12. Katarzyna Kreczmer – 29 May 2000
13. Bogdan Wencel – 21 June 2000
14. Bożena Pieczara – 28 June 2000
15. Grażyna Eysmont – 2 September 2000
16. Edward Mierzwa – 2 September 2000
17. Marek Pawlak – 8 September 2000
18. Tadeusz Biały – 9 September 2000
19. Piotr Kopczyński – 30 September 2000
20. Tomasz Guzek – 4 October 2000
21. Wojciech Chocianowski – 25 November 2000
22. Marek Duszczyk – 9 December 2000
23. Mariusz Jaszczuk – 15 December 2000
24. Jan Mika – 1 January 2001
25. Mieczysław Kulesza – 14 January 2001
26. Marcin Grzelak – 22 January 2001
27. Przemysław Radowicz – 11 February 2001
28. Barbara ? & Mirosław ? – 14 February 2001
29. Tadeusz Grabowski – 11 March 2001
30. Tomasz Lipiński – 19 March 2001
31. Mariusz Kowalski – 7 April 2001
32. Arkadiusz Jadacki – 14 April 2001
33. Marek Fotek – 23 April 2001
34. Wiesław Czekaj – 4 May 2001
35. Stojan Nedalkov – 6 May 2001
36. Zbigniew Męcik – 17 June 2001
37. Andrzej Łukaszczyk – 30 June 2001
38. Monika Żuczkowska – 22 October 2001
39. Jacek Branas – 19 November 2001
40. Joanna Dymczyk – 24 November 2001
41. Andrzej Kamiński – 3 December 2001
42. Henryk Bronner – 30 December 2001
43. Ewa Wota – 6 January 2002
44. Maciej Krawczyński – 13 January 2002
45. Henryk Czarny – 3 February 2002
46. Piotr Bednarczyk – 10 March 2002
47. Marek Piłat – 16 March 2002
48. Katarzyna Skrzynecka & Maciej Kozłowski – ? April 2002 (Celebrity Special)
49. Artur Barciś & Cezary Żak – ? April 2002 (Celebrity Special)
50. Witold Myśliwiec – 6 April 2002
51. Andrzej Wardyn – 27 April 2002
52. Mirosław Monczyński – 29 April 2002
53. Monika Brochacka & Piotr Borucki – ? June 2002 (Big Brother Special)
54. Tomasz Derda – 20 October 2002
55. Józef Mieluch – 10 November 2002
56. Jerzy Pasternak – 2 December 2002
57. Krzysztof Bendkowski – 16 December 2002
58. Agnieszka Stachurska – 26 January 2003

=== Second edition ===
==== 1,000,000 złoty winners ====
1. Krzysztof Wójcik – 28 March 2010

==== 500,000 złoty winners ====
1. Paulina Kowalczyk – 5 April 2008
2. Dagna Sieńko – 18 May 2008
3. Rafał Tomański – 22 November 2008
4. Renata Dancewicz & Piotr Adamczyk – 7 December 2008 (Celebrity Special)
5. Marzena Rogowska – 25 April 2009
6. Katarzyna Zaręba – 24 October 2010
7. Karolina Korwin-Piotrowska & Michał Piróg – 19 December 2010 (Celebrity Special)

Four players guessed the correct answer after resigning from playing.

==== 500,000 złoty question wrong (lost 210,000 złoty) ====
1. Sławomir Kucharczyk – 6 April 2008
2. Lidia Wołk-Karaczewska – 14 March 2009
3. Dorota Śliwak – 19 September 2010

==== 250,000 złoty winners ====
1. Elżbieta Orłowska – 29 March 2008
2. Dorota Kwiecińska – 27 April 2008
3. Marek Kraśnicki – 7 September 2008
4. Marcin Bobrowski – 19 April 2009
5. Tomasz Radko – 1 November 2009
6. Szymon Hołownia & Marcin Prokop – 26 December 2009 (Celebrity Special)
7. Jakub Tomys – 2 May 2010
8. Jędrzej Wiczkowski – 20 June 2010
9. Magdalena Lula – 10 October 2010

==== 250,000 złoty question wrong (lost 85,000 złoty) ====
1. Agnieszka Nyka-Jankowska – 8 March 2008
2. Kinga Rusin & Bartosz Węglarczyk – 6 December 2008 (Saint Nicholas Day Celebrity Special)
3. Monika Kowalczyk – 17 October 2010

==== 125,000 złoty winners ====
1. Elżbieta Sokołowska – 27 January 2008
2. Paweł Staszyński – 10 February 2008
3. Joanna Słowińska – 17 May 2008
4. Ewa Drzyzga & Szymon Majewski – 1 June 2008 (Celebrity Special)
5. Małgorzata Czepek – 7 June 2008
6. Waldemar Kazimierski – 6 September 2008
7. Wojciech Przybyłowicz – 25 October 2008
8. Weronika Bielacha – 29 March 2009
9. Sławomir Chromik – 10 May 2009
10. Jolanta Falcman – 20 September 2009
11. Artur Szczęsny – 18 October 2009
12. Sebastian Rzodkiewicz – 4 April 2010
13. Łukasz Weber – 25 April 2010
14. Kajetan Pawełczyk – 16 May 2010
15. Mikołaj Dulęba – 7 November 2010
16. Maciej Piszcz – 21 November 2010

=== Third edition ===
==== 1,000,000 złoty winners ====
1. Maria Romanek – 21 March 2018
2. Katarzyna Kant-Wysocka – 14 March 2019
3. Jacek Iwaszko – 23 September 2021
4. Tomasz Orzechowski – 19 September 2022
5. Mateusz Żaboklicki – 12 March 2024
6. Tomasz Boruch – 3 April 2024
7. Marek Wojtuń – 13 November 2024

==== 1,000,000 złoty question wrong (lost 460,000 złoty) ====
1. Dawid Michalewski – 5 October 2020

==== 500,000 złoty winners ====
1. Sonia Ciuk – 15 March 2017
2. Kinga Rusin & Piotr Kraśko – 15 April 2017 (Celebrity Special)
3. Remigiusz Skubisz – 16 October 2017
4. Zbigniew Zamachowski & Borys Szyc – 7 December 2017 (Celebrity Special)
5. Dominik Komorek – 10 September 2018
6. Maksymilian Bilewicz – 4 March 2019
7. Marcin Kot – 16 March 2020
8. Łukasz Grymuza – 22 October 2020
9. Maciej Adamski – 16 November 2020
10. Mikołaj Masłowski – 2 December 2020
11. Maciej Mędrzycki – 7 April 2022
12. Przemysław Zieliński – 21 April 2022
13. Małgorzata Rozenek-Majdan & Krzysztof Skórzyński – 3 October 2022 (TVN 25th Anniversary Celebrity Special)
14. Jakub Kasperkiewicz – 20 October 2023 (final episode of 2 million złoty week (Note: Kept 12,000 złoty after negotiating the opportunity to play for two million – his total winnings therefore amounted to 512,000 złoty.))
15. Sławomir Świątecki – 17 April 2024

==== 500,000 złoty question wrong (lost 210,000 złoty) ====
1. Joanna Stroczkowska – 22 February 2017
2. Wojciech Zaręba – 27 September 2017
3. Wojciech Czubak – 19 February 2018
4. Aleksandra Burdka – 4 April 2018
5. Katarzyna Wincza & Lena Pachuc – 5 December 2019 (Saint Nicholas Day Special)
6. Anna Serzysko – 27 October 2020
7. Sabina Pecio – 25 March 2021
8. Konrad Jurgiewicz – 16 September 2021
9. Michał Tadeusz Koziej – 28 September 2021
10. Łukasz Zdrojkowski – 14 March 2022
11. Klaudia Rymut – 23 March 2023
12. Ryszard Kusina – 21 September 2023
13. Marta Wasińska – 6 November 2023
14. Radosław Radowski – 9 November 2023
15. Jarosław Kowalczyk – 7 March 2024

==== 250,000 złoty winners ====
1. Jakub Rudnicki – 8 March 2017
2. Katarzyna Kołaczkowska – 29 March 2017
3. Ilona Rasińska – 12 April 2017
4. Alicja Bańczyk – 14 September 2017
5. Agnieszka Dachterska – 25 October 2017
6. Maciej Krawiec – 8 November 2017
7. Hanna Czapla – 21 February 2018
8. Magdalena Rybicka – 27 March 2018
9. Andrzej Gręziak – 28 March 2018
10. Bartosz Kołecki – 18 April 2018
11. Łukasz Półrolniczak – 25 April 2018
12. Tomasz Otręba – 5 September 2018
13. Judyta Perczak – 3 December 2018
14. Anna Cichosz – 26 February 2019
15. Joanna Liszowska & Tomasz Sapryk – 21 March 2019 (Celebrity Special)
16. Bartłomiej Marcjaniak – 25 April 2019
17. Joanna Szczudlik-Kowalczyk – 3 September 2019
18. Ewa Kamarad – 4 September 2019
19. Filip Olszówka – 12 September 2019
20. Dawid Tusiński – 26 September 2019
21. Dorota Rutkowska-Skwara – 16 October 2019
22. Zbigniew Górski – 23 October 2019
23. Agata Langowska – 29 October 2019
24. Jolanta Glinka-Kalisz – 14 November 2019
25. Mikołaj Wieczorek – 4 March 2020
26. Hanna Przydatek – 5 March 2020
27. Magdalena Ziółek – 11 March 2020
28. Marta Maszkiewicz – 12 October 2020
29. Jan Sękowski – 16 February 2021
30. Anna Wrona – 18 February 2021
31. Piotr Rutkowski – 26 April 2021
32. Marzena Szymanowska-Pietrzyk – 2 September 2021
33. Szymon Batura – 13 September 2021
34. Leszek Kędzierski – 11 October 2021
35. Bogdan Wójcik – 3 November 2021
36. Marek Kalus – 21 March 2022
37. Piotr Tyburski – 5 September 2022
38. Magdalena Wilczek – 29 September 2022
39. Rafał Rak – 17 October 2022
40. Jacek Borusiński & Wojciech Malajkat – 1 December 2022 (Saint Nicolas Day Special)
41. Marta Kuligowska & Magdalena Cielecka – 7 March 2023 (Women's Day Celebrity Special)
42. Justyna Nahajowska – 3 April 2023
43. Paulina Krupińska & Wojciech Łozowski – 24 May 2023 (Celebrity Special)
44. Bartłomiej Bar – 14 September 2023 (Note: On Player.pl: 13 September 2023.)
45. Michał Kosacki – 19 October 2023 (qualifying episode of 2 million złoty week (Note: Advanced to the final episode but decided not to play for two million – his total winnings therefore amounted to 250,000 złoty.))
46. Konrad Walkowiak – 6 December 2023
47. Anna Mandes – 25 March 2024
48. Filip Kuśmierczyk – 11 April 2024
49. Krzysztof Marczak – 23 April 2024
50. Patrycja Pietras – 7 November 2024
51. Jan Szczepaniak – 8 June 2025

==== 250,000 złoty question wrong (lost 85,000 złoty) ====
1. Magdalena Pelczarska – 27 March 2017
2. Kacper Bakota – 5 September 2017
3. Agnieszka Mirek – 31 October 2017
4. Przemysław Winzer – 30 November 2017
5. Agnieszka Pobłocka – 7 March 2018
6. Piotr Tabarkiewicz – 13 March 2018
7. Katarzyna Jaworska – 16 April 2018
8. Agnieszka Augustyn – 9 May 2018
9. Alicja Maria Wąsowska – 6 September 2018
10. Marek Krukowski – 12 September 2018
11. Łukasz Sieciński – 19 September 2018
12. Michał Mazurowski – 24 September 2018
13. Mikołaj Sowiński – 26 September 2018
14. Wiktor Kazanecki – 18 October 2018
15. Blanka Mikiciuk – 19 November 2018
16. Patricia Kazadi & Olaf Lubaszenko – 6 December 2018 (Saint Nicolas Day Celebrity Special)
17. Jarosław Kukiełka – 18 March 2019
18. Piotr Jeżewski – 2 May 2019
19. Adrian Thrun – 21 May 2019
20. Malwina Pawlęty – 5 September 2019
21. Łukasz Zaliwski – 9 September 2019
22. Bartłomiej Iwański – 30 September 2020
23. Alicja Straczyńska-Błach – 21 April 2021
24. Joanna Gąsiorowska – 11 November 2021
25. Robert Kamiński – 2 March 2022
26. Tomasz Madej – 7 March 2022
27. Andrzej Dębowy – 6 October 2022
28. Jan Wiszniewski – 27 October 2022
29. Michał Romański – 2 November 2022
30. Olga Żukowicz – 28 February 2023
31. Marcin Maj – 2 March 2023
32. Mateusz Całka – 9 March 2023
33. Andrzej Pawluś – 20 April 2023
34. Justyna Steczkowska & Leon Myszkowski – 1 June 2023 (Children's Day Celebrity Special)
35. Mikołaj Adamiec-Siemiątkowski – 5 October 2023
36. Magdalena Kowalczyk – 24 October 2023
37. Daniel Świątoniowski – 6 March 2024
38. Jakub Dominiak – 18 March 2024
39. Artur Tondera-Bliziński – 1 May 2024
40. Grzegorz Koper – 22 June 2025

==== 200,000 złoty winners ====
1. Mikołaj Mielczarek – 20 October 2023 (final episode of 2 million złoty week)

==== 125,000 złoty winners ====
1. Mateusz Buczek – 21 February 2017
2. Beata Wodejko-Kucharska – 1 March 2017
3. Michał Kowalczewski – 22 March 2017
4. Katarzyna Romanek – 4 April 2017
5. Joanna Flasza – 6 April 2017
6. Konrad Janik – 6 April 2017
7. Karol Pietrowicz – 17 May 2017
8. Maciej Walewski – 19 September 2017
9. Mariusz Boheński – 2 October 2017
10. Jakub Pękala – 11 October 2017
11. Adam Fuchs – 18 October 2017
12. Magdalena Wiaterska – 15 November 2017
13. Szymon Wojtyra – 5 December 2017
14. Paweł Duda – 20 February 2018
15. Arkadiusz Skiba – 26 February 2018
16. Emilia Dadan – 28 February 2018
17. Weronika Zblewska – 12 March 2018
18. Justyna Męcik – 11 April 2018
19. Weronika Bujnowska – 3 September 2018
20. Wioletta Ryczek – 11 September 2018
21. Jacek Piątkowski – 17 September 2018
22. Agnieszka Nawrocka – 19 September 2018
23. Błażej Szulc – 7 November 2018
24. Wojciech Lipiński – 13 November 2018
25. Tomasz Remian – 15 November 2018
26. Damian Zieliński – 18 April 2019
27. Błażej Krzywicki – 13 May 2019
28. Jarosław Hirny-Budka – 23 May 2019
29. Mirosława Obst – 8 October 2019
30. Piotr Maćkowiak – 24 October 2019
31. Paweł Jokiel – 31 October 2019
32. Karol Filczak – 7 November 2019
33. Marek Muszyński – 11 November 2019
34. Mirosław Kobus – 21 November 2019
35. Szymon Jankowski – 27 November 2019
36. Adrian Pietrzak – 26 March 2020
37. Sebastian Zasada – 10 September 2020
38. Filip Wołowski – 24 September 2020
39. Paweł Goleniowski – 6 October 2020
40. Hanna Janus – 5 November 2020
41. Filip Dawidowicz – 10 November 2020
42. Paulina Krupińska & Damian Michałowski – 3 December 2020 (Saint Nicolas Day Celebrity Special)
43. Jerzy Kuhn – 2 March 2021
44. Andrzej Grabowski – 24 March 2021
45. Przemysław Dąbek – 30 September 2021
46. Michał Ślusarz – 21 October 2021
47. Sebastian Kusz – 25 November 2021
48. Emil Witczak – 30 November 2021
49. Marcin Wojciechowski – 1 December 2021
50. Jan Steinmetz – 3 March 2022
51. Sebastian Jurgielewicz – 5 May 2022
52. Łukasz Wesołowski – 11 May 2022
53. Monika Zega – 7 September 2022
54. Jakub Maj – 12 September 2022
55. Marek Sławik – 9 November 2022
56. Agnieszka Suchora & Agata Kulesza – 7 March 2023 (Women's Day Special)
57. Mikołaj Sadek – 13 April 2023
58. Jarosław Bieniuk & Szymon Bieniuk – 1 June 2023 (Children's Day Special)
59. Zbigniew Szalak – 22 November 2023
60. Łukasz Meyer – 28 November 2023
61. Michalina Kwiecińska – 30 November 2023
62. Ewa Kubczak-Wodejko – 19 March 2024
63. Jacek Bargieł – 9 April 2024
64. Wioleta Adamiec – 18 April 2024
65. Anna Downar – 25 April 2024
66. Tomasz Witkiewicz – 6 May 2024
67. Katarzyna Seweryn – 28 November 2024
68. Rafał Sidorowicz – 12 December 2024

=== Fourth edition ===
==== 1,000,000 złoty winners ====
1. Bartosz Radziejewski – 10 November 2025
2. Elżbieta Marszalec - 12 March 2026

==== 500,000 złoty winners ====
1. Adrian Macielak – 22 October 2025
2. Agnieszka Bławaciuk - 5 October 2026
3. Zuzanna Janusz – 5 November 2026

==== 500,000 złoty question wrong (lost 200,000 złoty) ====
1. Natalia Kędziorek – 4 September 2025
2. Mateusz Białas – 26 November 2025

==== 250,000 złoty winners ====
1. Adrian Pacuszka – 3 September 2025
2. Sabina Olech – 29 September 2025
3. Krzysztof Wypij – 2 October 2025
4. Bartłomiej Chomacki – 4 November 2025
5. Julia Dyś – 6 November 2025
6. Magdalena Ornoch – 27 May 2026
7. Aleksander Oziewicz – 9 June 2026
8. Grzegorz Sztolcman – 21 September 2026
9. Michał Sowa – 13 October 2026

==== 250,000 złoty question wrong (lost 75,000 złoty) ====
1. Alina Budziszewska-Makulska – 17 September 2025
2. Aleksandra Ferdek – 15 October 2025
3. Martyna Zawadzka – 17 November 2025
4. Arkadiusz Falkiewicz – 18 November 2025
5. Danuta Talowska – 26 November 2025
6. Agnieszka Fabisiak – 26 February 2026
7. Rafał Stronk – 11 March 2026
8. Edyta Węgrzyn – 16 April 2026
9. Jędrzej Dominiczak – 23 April 2026
10. Michał Kuszneruk – 29 April 2026
11. Agata Weryszko – 28 May 2026
12. Michał Mizgała – 4 June 2026

==== 125,000 złoty winners ====
1. Emil Serednicki – 9 October 2025
2. Małgorzata Wojtowicz – 13 October 2025
3. Beata Lewkowicz – 20 October 2025
4. Rita Winiarska – 30 October 2025
5. Magdalena Pasik – 25 February 2026
6. Krzysztof Kusiak – 10 March 2026
7. Paweł Szczurowski – 16 March 2026
8. Sławomir Walczuk – 1 April 2026
9. Łukasz Jurkowski & Jerzy Mielewski (Celebrity Easter Special) – 6 April 2026
10. Jakub Ferek – 7 May 2026
11. Paweł Mastalerz – 14 May 2026
12. Bożena Maryniak-Dudzik – 3 June 2026
13. Waldemar Sobera – 11 June 2026
14. Zuzanna Żak – 10 September 2026
15. Magdalena Sopińska – 29 September 2026
16. Marcel Łoza – 3 November 2026

== Questions for million złoty ==
In Milionerzy, 39 questions for one million złoty appeared. 27 players walked away, and 12 players answered the question. Two players answered incorrectly, while ten players answered correctly and won 1 million złoty. Here are the questions:

- Władysław Kostrzewski – 21 October 2000 (resigned)

1,000,000 zł (15 of 15)

What country did Conan the Barbarian come from?

1. from Rivia
2. from Mordor
3. from Land of Oz
4. from Cimmeria(correct answer)
- Zbigniew Chrzanowski – 21 May 2001 (resigned)

1,000,000 zł (15 of 15)

As in song by Kabaret Starszych Panów, repellent goon will get a double-barreled shotgun, will go out and...:

1. fast-fast!
2. bang, bang!(correct answer)
3. from two pipes
4. shoot into boom
- Jerzy Mirski – 14 October 2001 (resigned)

1,000,000 zł (15 of 15)

Comics "child" of drawer Bob Kane is:

1. Superman
2. Batman(correct answer)
3. Spider-Man
4. Captain America
- Filip Łapiński – 2 June 2002 (special edition with participation of children; gave a wrong answer)

1,000,000 zł (15 of 15)

One of these animals is not a fish:

1. nase(answer was eliminated either using the 50:50 lifeline or by choosing it while using the Double Dip lifeline)
2. blue bream(answer was eliminated either using the 50:50 lifeline or by choosing it while using the Double Dip lifeline)
3. rudd(chosen; incorrect answer)
4. European roller(correct answer)
- Paulina Kowalczyk – 5 April 2008 (resigned)

1,000,000 zł (12 of 12)

Who is the master of the same arms that Artemis specialises?

1. Zorro
2. Legolas(correct answer)
3. Don Quixote(answer was eliminated either using the 50:50 lifeline or by choosing it while using the Double Dip lifeline)
4. Longinus Podbipięta(answer was eliminated either using the 50:50 lifeline or by choosing it while using the Double Dip lifeline)
- Dagna Sieńko – 18 May 2008 (resigned)

1,000,000 zł (12 of 12)

Who of these actors was born in the year when the Lumiere brothers patented cinematograph?

1. Rudolph Valentino(correct answer)
2. Humphrey Bogart
3. Charlie Chaplin
4. Fred Astaire
- Rafał Tomański – 22 November 2008 (resigned)

1,000,000 zł (12 of 12)

Pro Archia Poeta turned into history as one of the brightest orations by:

1. Isocrates
2. Cicero(correct answer)
3. Demosthenes(answer was eliminated either using the 50:50 lifeline or by choosing it while using the Double Dip lifeline)
4. Quintilian(answer was eliminated either using the 50:50 lifeline or by choosing it while using the Double Dip lifeline)
- Renata Dancewicz and Piotr Adamczyk – 7 December 2008 (Celebrity Special; resigned)

1,000,000 zł (12 of 12)

Who was the painter in the court of King Philip IV of Spain?

1. Marcello Bacciarelli(answer was eliminated either using the 50:50 lifeline or by choosing it while using the Double Dip lifeline)
2. Jan van Eyck(answer was eliminated either using the 50:50 lifeline or by choosing it while using the Double Dip lifeline)
3. Diego Velázquez(correct answer)
4. Jacques-Louis David
- Marzena Rogowska – 25 April 2009 (resigned)

1,000,000 zł (12 of 12)

Maraschino liqueur is made of Marasca, which is type of:

1. cherry(correct answer)
2. apple
3. fig
4. pear
- Krzysztof Wójcik – 28 March 2010 (gave a right answer)

1,000,000 zł (12 of 12)

Czesław Mozil is famous for playing on what instrument?

1. cornet
2. accordion(correct answer)
3. djembe
4. xylophone
- Katarzyna Zaręba – 24 October 2010 (resigned)

1,000,000 zł (12 of 12)

Which of these Juliusz Słowacki's poems are written in prose?

1. "Godzina myśli"
2. "W Szwajcarii"
3. "Anhelli"(correct answer)
4. "Arab"
- Karolina Korwin-Piotrowska and Michał Piróg – 19 December 2010 (Celebrity Special; resigned)

1,000,000 zł (12 of 12)

Doesn't have dorsal fin:

1. basking shark
2. common thresher
3. killer whale
4. bowhead whale(correct answer)
- Sonia Ciuk – 15 March 2017 (resigned)

1,000,000 zł (12 of 12)

"Liver with onion (...) is a perfect appetizer. To make it, you have to buy a car and drive it until someone runs over it". This is Lem and...

1. Solaris
2. Tales of Pirx the Pilot
3. Dictations, or...(correct answer)
4. Hospital of the Transfiguration
- Kinga Rusin and Piotr Kraśko – 15 April 2017 (Celebrity Special; resigned)

1,000,000 zł (12 of 12)

The Polish lynx, the Rostov swan, the Saxon stork and the Smolensk dump truck are:

1. pigeon breeds(correct answer)
2. chicken breeds
3. beetles
4. skateboard acrobatics
- Remigiusz Skubisz – 16 October 2017 (resigned)

1,000,000 zł (12 of 12)

According to Leszek Kołakowski, what is the vault of the house where the human spirit lives?

1. Mind
2. God
3. Love
4. Time(correct answer)
- Zbigniew Zamachowski and Borys Szyc – 7 December 2017 (Celebrity Special; resigned)

1,000,000 zł (12 of 12)

The icon of the June 1989 elections was a photo with Wałęsa signed "Vote for...". Who from the so-called Lech's team did not have it?

1. Jacek Kuroń
2. Hanna Suchocka
3. Jarosław Kaczyński
4. Lech Kaczyński(correct answer)
- Maria Romanek – 21 March 2018 (gave a right answer)

1,000,000 zł (12 of 12)

What is 1,111 times 1,111 if 1 times 1 is 1 and 11 times 11 is 121?

1. 12,321
2. 1,234,321(correct answer)
3. 111,111,111
4. 123,454,321
- Dominik Komorek – 10 September 2018 (resigned)

1,000,000 zł (12 of 12)

Which instrument is tuned by a musician?

1. tambourine
2. timpani(correct answer)
3. ocarina
4. karatalas
- Maksymilian Bilewicz – 4 March 2019 (resigned)

1,000,000 zł (12 of 12)

Which mammal won't sweat?

1. ovis
2. horse
3. human
4. rabbit(correct answer)
- Katarzyna Kant-Wysocka – 14 March 2019 (gave a right answer)

1,000,000 zł (12 of 12)

One of these is not one of the Rosary's Glorious Mysteries:

1. The Assumption of the Mother of God
2. The Resurrection of Jesus
3. The Death of Jesus on the Cross(correct answer)
4. The Descent of the Holy Spirit
- Marcin Kot – 16 March 2020 (resigned)

1,000,000 zł (12 of 12)

Each color of white light propagates in transparent bodies at a different speed. The greatest speed is:

1. red(correct answer)
2. orange
3. yellow
4. violet
- Dawid Michalewski – 5 October 2020 (gave a wrong answer)

1,000,000 zł (12 of 12)

The Jewish Festival of Lights, also known as Hanukkah, lasts eight days. How many holiday candles are lit on a special candlestick on the eighth day?

1. six
2. seven(chosen; incorrect answer)
3. eight(correct answer)
4. ten
- Łukasz Grymuza – 22 October 2020 (resigned)

1,000,000 zł (12 of 12)

Some of the fruits ripen after harvest. Which broken unripe will remain so?

1. cherry(correct answer)
2. banana
3. pear
4. avocado
- Maciej Adamski – 16 November 2020 (resigned)

1,000,000 zł (12 of 12)

The Caribbean manatee, like the African manatee, has only front limbs. And the Azerbaijani manat, like the Turkmenistani manat:

1. has both front and rear limbs
2. replaced the ruble(correct answer)
3. covers the whole body
4. is a loner
- Mikołaj Masłowski – 2 December 2020 (resigned)

1,000,000 zł (12 of 12)

The names of the five Polish cities are engraved on the Arc de Triomphe in Paris, dedicated to the memory of the Napoleonic victories. Among the given cities with the one not engraved is:

1. Warsaw(correct answer)
2. Wrocław
3. Gdańsk
4. Ostrołęka
- Jacek Iwaszko – 23 September 2021 (gave a right answer)

1,000,000 zł (12 of 12)

When did the second millennium begin?

1. 1 January 1000
2. 1 January 1001(correct answer)
3. 1 January 2000
4. 1 January 2001
- Maciej Mędrzycki – 7 April 2022 (resigned)

1,000,000 zł (12 of 12)

Which village is farthest from Koniec Świata (the End of the World), also known as Głuszyna-Podlas in Greater Poland Voivodeship?

1. from Niebo (Heaven) in Świętokrzyskie Voivodeship
2. from Czyściec (Purgatory) in Greater Poland Voivodeship
3. from Piekło (Hell) in Pomeranian Voivodeship(correct answer)
4. from Raj (Paradise) in Łódź Voivodeship
- Przemysław Zieliński – 21 April 2022 (resigned)

1,000,000 zł (12 of 12)

Paddington Bear, whom the Brown family found at a train station in London, comes from the dark corners in...

1. Peru(correct answer)
2. Mexico
3. Russia
4. India
- Tomasz Orzechowski – 19 September 2022 (gave a right answer)

1,000,000 zł (12 of 12)

Who in the mid-19th century composed the famous "Prayer of the Virgin", a piece played in Europe, in the United States, but the most popular in Japan to this day?

1. Franz Liszt from Raiding
2. Edvard Grieg from Bergen
3. Robert Schumann from Zwickau
4. Tekla Bądarzewska from Mława(correct answer)
- Małgorzata Rozenek-Majdan and Krzysztof Skórzyński – 3 October 2022 (Celebrity Special; resigned)

1,000,000 zł (12 of 12)

Italo Calvino invited Tazio Bazakbal to the novel If on a winter's night a traveler directly from the pages of Farewell to Autumn by:

1. Witkacy(correct answer)
2. Witold Gombrowicz
3. Sławomir Mrożek
4. Italo Calvino
- Mateusz Żaboklicki – 12 March 2024 (gave a right answer)

1,000,000 zł (12 of 12)

Tetrapods do not include:

1. reptiles
2. amphibians
3. birds
4. insects(correct answer)
- Tomasz Boruch – 3 April 2024 (gave a right answer)

1,000,000 zł (12 of 12)

In what strait are two islands called Yesterday and Tomorrow, separated by less than four kilometers but with a time difference of as much as 21 hours?

1. in the Bosphorus Strait
2. in the Strait of Magellan
3. in the Caleta Strait
4. in the Bering Strait(correct answer)
- Sławomir Świątecki – 17 April 2024 (resigned)

1,000,000 zł (12 of 12)

"Like the masters of sweets, they first give gifts when they train boys to make promises." The promise, i.e.:

1. alphabet(correct answer)
2. solemn oath
3. body rounding
4. harlotry
- Marek Wojtuń – 13 November 2024 (gave a right answer)

1,000,000 zł (12 of 12)

The structure of the digestive system of which animal indicates that it is a predator?

1. llama
2. koala
3. panda(correct answer)
4. roe deer
- Adrian Macielak – 22 October 2025 (resigned)

1,000,000 zł (12 of 12)

A Nupturient is someone who is getting ready:

1. for the wedding(correct answer)
2. for the final exams
3. into the army
4. to the concert
- Bartosz Radziejewski – 10 November 2025 (gave a right answer)

1,000,000 zł (12 of 12)

The senses of a sapiosexual will be ignited by:

1. rare chateaubriand steak
2. selfie in pajamas
3. a quote from Kant or Einstein(correct answer)
4. photo from a holiday in Bali
- Elżbieta Marszalec - 12 March 2026 (gave a right answer)

1,000,000 zł (12 of 12)

How many dimensions does a geometric point have?

1. zero(correct answer)
2. one
3. two
4. three
- Agnieszka Bławaciuk - 5 October 2026 (resigned)

1,000,000 zł (12 of 12)

Hakes are rarely seen, but when they are, the easiest places to spot them are:

1. on the beach(correct answer)
2. in Krakow's Market Square
3. on a high mountain meadow
4. under the microscope
- Zuzanna Janusz – 5 November 2026 (resigned)

1,000,000 zł (12 of 12)

An airplane flies between cities A and B at a constant airspeed. If there is a constant wind blowing along the route, then the total time for the round trip:

1. will be shortened
2. will not change
3. depends on the strength of the wind
4. will become longer(correct answer)

== Faux pas ==
In Milionerzy there were three situations when a player lost because of a laxly said question and was restored to play.

- The first player made a mistake in the question for 32,000 zł: "Who invented the steam engine?". He answered "James Watt", but the correct answer was "Charles Algernon Parsons". After a complaint to programme's producer, his answer was recognized as correct. The player won a guaranteed 32,000 zł, but he answered incorrectly in the next question for 64,000 zł.
- The second player made a mistake in the question for 500 zł: "How many cuts are on Kaiser rolls?". He answered: "4" (the correct answer was "5") and he won nothing. After recognizing his answer, he answered incorrectly in the question for 1000 zł and he left the studio with nothing for the second time.
- The third player on the question about the author of the picture The Luncheon on the Grass answered Claude Monet, but the correct answer was Édouard Manet. But Monet also painted a less known picture with the same title, so the player was allowed to continue playing.
