= Bogusław Kaczmarczyk =

Polish actor (born 1974)

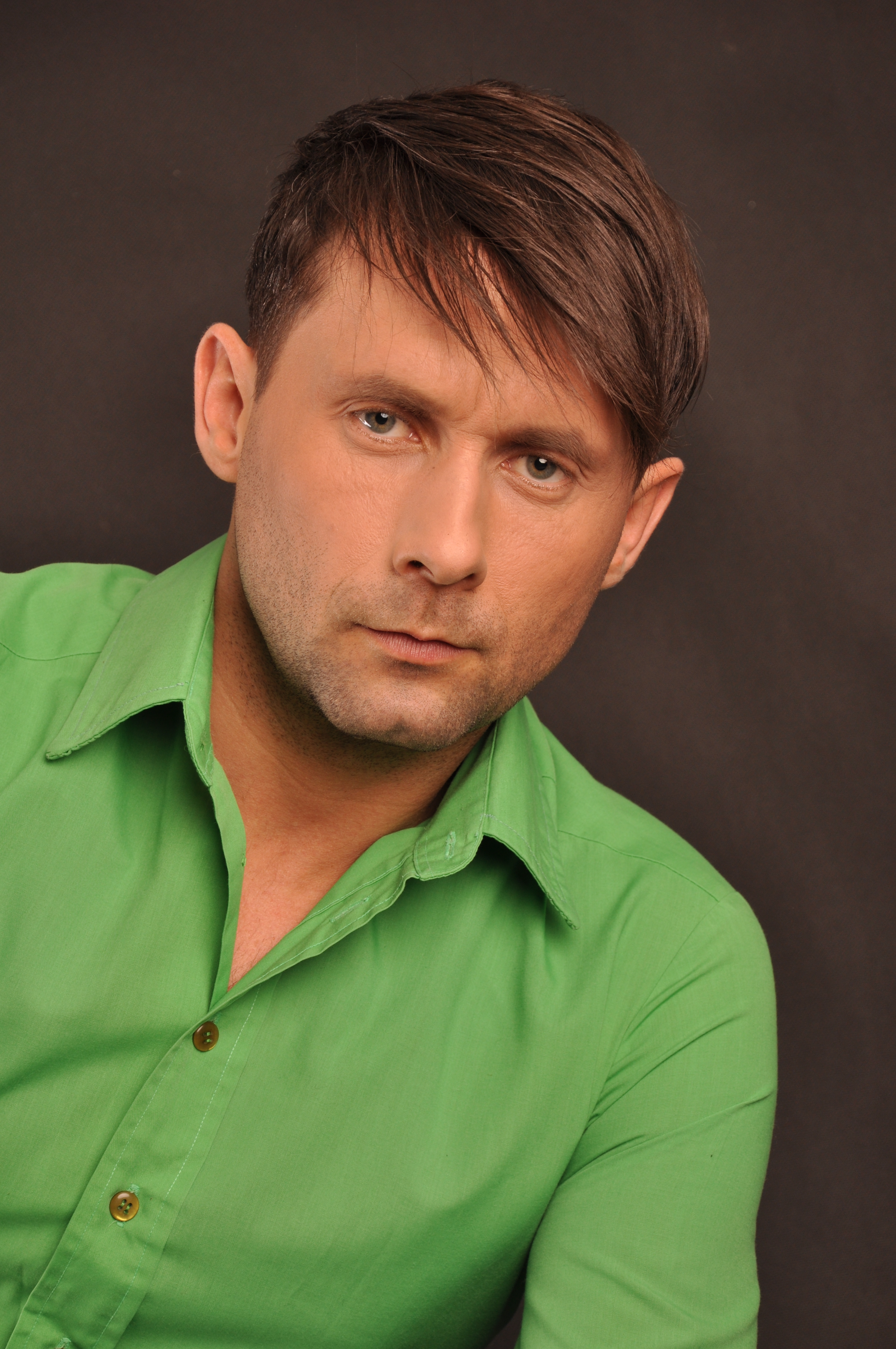
- Kaczmarczyk in 2010.
- Born: Bogusław Kaczmarczyk; 11 December 1974 (age 51); Kraków, Poland
- Occupation: Actor
- Years active: 1995–present

Bogusław Kaczmarczyk (born 11 December 1974; Polish: [bɔˈɡu.swaf kat͡ʂˈmar.t͡ʂɘ̟k]) is a Polish television actor and comedian. He is best known from the role of Bogumił Nowak in the Polsat sitcom series Off the Stretcher (2003–2009), and in its sequels, Off the Stretcher 2 (2010–2011), Daleko od noszy. Szpital futpolowy (2011), and Daleko od noszy. Reanimacja (2017).

== Biography ==
Bogusław Kaczmarczyk was born on 11 December 1974 in Kraków, Poland. He left his family house at the age of 16, and performed numerous professionals, such as a waiter, eventually graduating from the Lart Post-Secondary Acting School in Kraków. For 12 years, Kaczmarczyk also worked as a dance instructor. In 1995, he and Maciej Stuhr founded the comedy group Po Żarcie, which operated until 1999, and was awarded the first place at the PaKA festival in 1997. Kaczmarczyk was also a member of the comedy group Kabaret Artura I. Together with Dominik Kwaśniewski, he formed the comedy duo titled Piekielny Duet (lit. 'Helish Duet'). In 2006, Kaczmarczyk co-founded the comedy group EKG, and in 2021, he joined the group PanDemon.

In 2001, Kaczmarczyk debuted on the screen with a minor role in the TVP2 medical drama television series Na dobre i na złe, and in the following years, he portrayed Bogumił Nowak, his most recognisable role, in the Polsat sitcom series Off the Stretcher, aired from 2003 to 2009, and in its sequels, Off the Stretcher 2 (2010–2011), Daleko od noszy. Szpital futpolowy (2011), and Daleko od noszy. Reanimacja (2017). Kaczmarczyk also had roles in television series such as The Clan (2005), Niania (2007), 39 and a Half (2008), Father Matthew (2010, 2015), First Love, Father Matthew (2017–2018), Barwy szczęścia (2018), The Crown of the Kings (2018–2020), Friends (2019), and Na Wspólnej (2020), and appeared in the feature films Autumn Girl (2021), and The Invisible War (2021). He also performed in several plays at several venues in Warsaw.

== Filmography ==
=== Films ===
Year	Title	Role	Notes
2013	Takie życie	Bohdan	Short film
2017	Na przekór astronomom	Mr. Pretty	Short film
2021	Autumn Girl	Franio	Feature film
2022	The Invisible War	Andrzej Fidyk	Feature film

=== Television series ===
Year	Title	Role	Notes
2001–2002	Na dobre i na złe	Receptionist Stanisław	2 episodes
2003–2009	Off the Stretcher	Bogumił Nowak	Main role; 163 episodes
2005	Egzamin z życia	Actor	Episode no. 19
2006	The Clan	Jan	Episode no. 1202
2007	Niania	Journalist	Episode: "Pokaz mody"
2007	Halo Hans!	Assault unit leader Kupke	Episode: "Szwagier"
2008	Agentki	Bartender	Episode: "Nudziarz czyli wielkie pieniądze"
2008	39 and a Half	Police officer	2 episodes
2010	Father Matthew	Marian Kern	Episode: "Sprawa Świętego Mikołaja"
2010–2011	Off the Stretcher 2	Bogumił Nowak	Main role; 37 episodes
2011	Daleko od noszy. Szpital futpolowy	Bogumił Nowak	Main role; 12 episodes
2011	Wiadomości z drugiej ręki	Bruno	Episode no. 32
2015	Father Matthew	Husband	Episode: "Piekło"
2015	Wesołowska i mediatorzy	—N/a	Secondary director
2017	Daleko od noszy. Reanimacja	Bogumił Nowak	Main role; 12 episodes
2017–2018	First Love	Stefan Smorąg	
2018	Barwy szczęścia	Bolek	Episode no. 1942
2018-2020	The Crown of the Kings	Trader from Samogitia	
2019	Friends	Marianna's landlord	Episode no. 157
2019	Gabinet numer 5	Patient	Episode no. 1
2020	Na Wspólnej	Krystian Żukowski	2 episodes
2021	Angel of Death	Prisoner	Episode no. 10
2021	Galaxy Taxi	Additional voices	Voice
2022	The Invisible War	Andrzej Fidyk	

== Theatre credits ==
Year	Title	Role	Venue	Director	Ref.
2008	V'nyl	Radiohead	Basen Artystyczny (Warsaw, Poland)	Tomasz Gawron	
2009	Kto dogoni psa?	No data	Ochota Theatre (Warsaw, Poland)	Marek Stacharski	
2009	Wariactwa według Czechowa	No data	Praga Theatre (Warsaw, Poland)	Marcin Kwaśny	
2010	Obce ciała	No data	Folwark. Praga Artistic Hub (Warsaw, Poland)	Urszula Agata Sobczak	
2013	Dwójka bez sternika	Husband	Za Daleki Theatre (Warsaw, Poland)	Jacek Raginis-Królikiewicz	
