= Aleksandra Woźniak =

Polish psychologist and actress (born 1974)

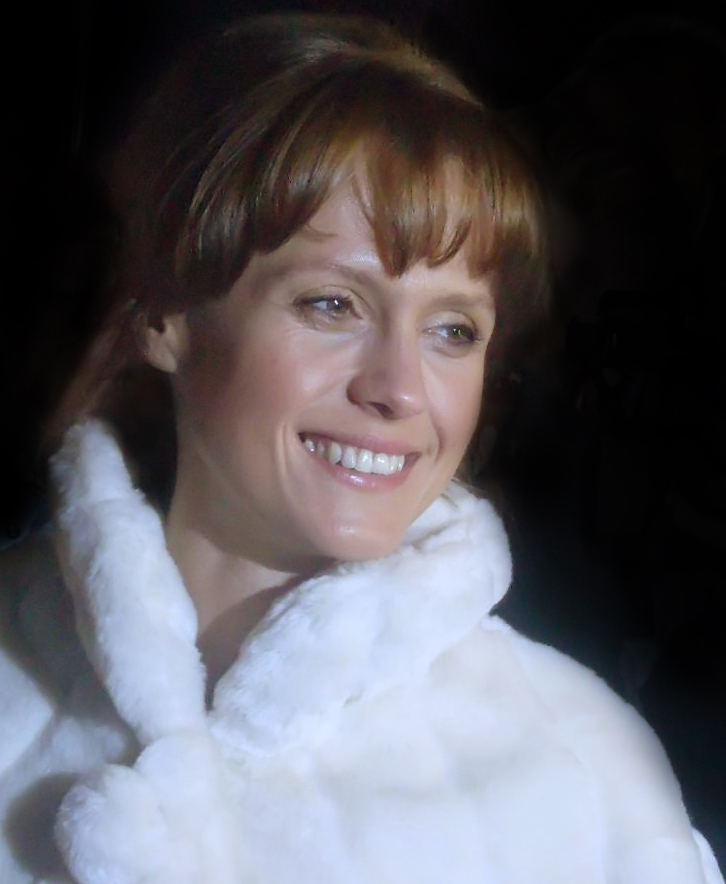
- Woźniak in 2008.
- Born: Aleksandra Maria Woźniak; 18 January 1975 (age 51); Warsaw, Poland
- Education: SWPS University
- Occupations: Psychologist; Actress
- Years active: 1992–2020
- Spouse: Szymon Miszewski (m. 2014)
- Children: 2

Aleksandra Maria Woźniak-Miszewska (Note: Polish pronunciation: [a.lɛkˈsan.dra ˈma.rja ˈvɔʑ.ɲak ˈmi.ˈʂɛf.ska]) (born 18 January 1975) is a Polish psychologist, and retired film and television actress. She is best known for her roles as Kasia in 13 posterunek (1997–2000), Agata Gabriel in Złotopolscy (2005–2008), Jagna Wyszkiewicz in Plebania (2010–2011), Monika Pruska in Linia życia (2011), Dominika Sadowska in Barwy szczęścia (2015–2016), and Zyta Chojnicka in The Clan (2017–2020).

== Early life and education ==
Aleksandra Woźniak was born on 18 January 1975 in Warsaw, Poland. She has a degree in Germanic philology, and speaks fluently in English, German, and Polish. She also studied at the Aleksander Zelwerowicz National Academy of Dramatic Art, however left after a year. In 2020, she also graduated with a degree in psychology from the Faculty of Psychology of the SWPS University in Sopot, Poland.

== Career ==
In 1992, at the age of 17, while still being a student, she was cast in a television play play Moje drzewko pomarańczowe, directed by Dorota Kędzierzawska for the Polish Television. In the following years, she also acted in films A Farewell to Maria (1993), Samowolka (1993), Dzień wielkiej ryby (1996), and Spona, and television series Spółka rodzinna (1994), and Sposób na Alcybiadesa (1997). She became well known for her role of Kasia in the Polsat sitcom series 13 posterunek (1997–2000), and later also for her performances as Agata Gabriel in Złotopolscy (2005–2008), Jagna Wyszkiewicz in Plebania (2010–2011), Monika Pruska in Linia życia (2011), Dominika Sadowska in Barwy szczęścia (2015–2016), and Zyta Chojnicka in The Clan (2017–2020). She also appeared in the television series Szpital na perypetiach (2001–2003), Król przedmieścia (2002), Off the Stretcher (2003), Crime Detectives (2006), and Faceci do wzięcia (2006). Additionally, in 2010, she was nominated to the Golden Duck award for her role in the 2008 comedy drama feature film Droga do raju.

Woźniak also hosted children's game show Hugo Family (2002–2003), as well as talk shows Świątek Piątek, czyli goście Aleksandry Woźniak (2003) and Cafe Espresso (2012), and was a presenenter for Romance TV. In 2007, she was a contestant in the game show Jak oni śpiewają.

In 2020, she announced her retirement from acting. Currently, she works as a psychologist, operating her own practice in Gdańsk, Poland.

== Personal life ==
Woźniak's first marriage lasted three months. A few years later she married politologist Tomasz Kuszłejko, with the couple divorcing two years later. They had two twin daughters, Julia and Anna Woźniaks, born in 2004. For two years, Woźniak was in a relationship with film and television director Maciej Ślesicki. In 2014, she married her third husband, Szymon Miszewski, with whom she resides in Gdańsk, Poland.

== Legacy ==
Woźniak was a subject of a biographical book by Marzanna Graff, titled Optymistki, dedicated to twelve noteworthy women, and published in 2009.

== Filmography ==
=== Films ===
Year	Title	Role	Notes
1992	Janko Muzykant		Television play
1992	Moje drzewko pomarańczowe		Television play
1993	A Farewell to Maria	Brown-haired girl	Feature film
1993	Niebieski ptak	Light	Television play
1993	Samowolka	Jaga	Television film
1996	Dzień wielkiej ryby	Patron's daughter	Feature film
1998	Spona	Ania	Feature film
2008	Droga do raju	Kasia	Feature film
2018	Verliebt in Masuren	Wanda	Feature film

=== Television series ===
Year	Title	Role	Notes
1994	Spółka rodzinna	Basia Lis	3 episodes
1997	Sposób na Alcybiadesa	Ania	3 episodes
1997–2000	13 posterunek	Kasia	Main role; 82 episodes
1999–2000	Trędowata	Marta	Episode no. 1
2001–2003	Szpital na perypetiach	Zuzanna	Recurring role; 30 episodes
2002	As	Ania Łubieńska	3 episodes
2002	Król przedmieścia	Jolanta Boruchowicz	Episode: "Dziewczyna dla Seweryna"
2002–2003	Hugo Family	Herself (host)	Game show
2003	Off the Stretcher	Zuzanna	Recurring role; 13 episodes
2003	Świątek Piątek, czyli goście Aleksandry Woźniak	Herself (host)	Talk show
2005–2008	Złotopolscy	Agata Gabriel	Main role; 204 episodes
2006	Crime Detectives	Weronika	Episode: "Pokonać strach"
2006	Faceci do wzięcia	Asia	Episode: "Śmiech przez łzy"
2006	Hela w opałach	Mother	Episode: "Mała miss"
2007	Jak oni śpiewają	Herself (contestant)	Game show
2009	39 and a Half	Klaudia	Episode: "Król nocy"
2010–2011	Plebania	Jagna Wyszkiewicz	Recurring role; 66 episodes
2011	Linia życia	Monika Pruska	
2011	Na dobre i na złe	Anna Nawrocka	Episode: "Obce ciało"
2012	Cafe Espresso	Herself (host)	Talk show
2015–2016	Barwy szczęścia	Dominika Sadowska	Recurring role; 18 episodes
2017–2020	The Clan	Zyta Chojnicka	Recurring role: 50 episodes
