= Plebania =

Polish soap opera

- Genre: Soap opera
- Created by: Mirosław Bork; Stanisław Krzemiński
- Starring: Włodzimierz Matuszak; Katarzyna Łaniewska
- Original language: Polish
- No. of seasons: 12
- No. of episodes: 1,829

Production
- Production locations: Okuniew, Poland
- Running time: 24 minutes

Original release
- Network: Telewizja Polska
- Release: October 5, 2000 – January 27, 2012

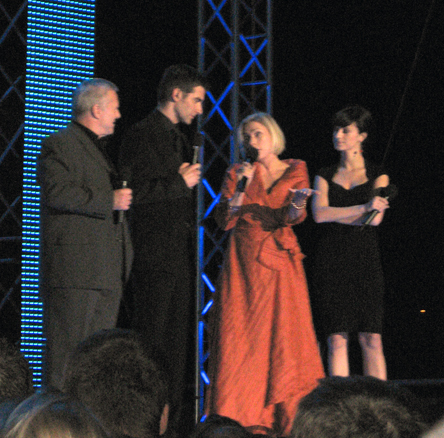
Tomasz Kammel and the stars of the TV series Plebania at the inauguration of the new season (September, 2007)

Plebania (Polish pronunciation: [plɛˈbãɲja]) (transl. Parsonage) is a Polish soap opera broadcast from October 5, 2000 to January 27, 2012 on TVP1. The series is about the lives of ordinary people in the fictional Polish village of Tulczyn. The plot revolves around the family, religious, and social issues of the village inhabitants with central roles played by a parish priest, his family and friends, and a wealthy business man known for shady dealings. Plebania is the second-longest (after Klan) Polish soap opera.
