= Magdalena Mazur =

Polish television presenter and model

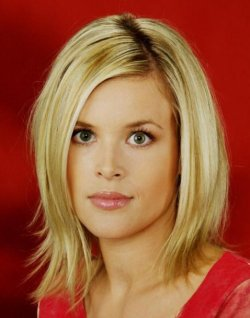
- Born: Magdalena Matysiewicz; May 26, 1976 (age 49); Katowice, Poland
- Occupation(s): Television presenter, model, actress
- Known for: Hosting "Różowa landrynka" and "Szał ciał"; acting in "Daleko od noszy"

Magdalena Matysiewicz better known as Magdalena Mazur (born 26 May 1976 in Katowice) is a Polish television presenter and model. She has acted in the comedy series Daleko od noszy. She has also hosted the erotic show Różowa landrynka on TV Polsat and the show Szał ciał on MTV Poland.
