= Agnieszka Suchora =

Polish actress (born 1968)

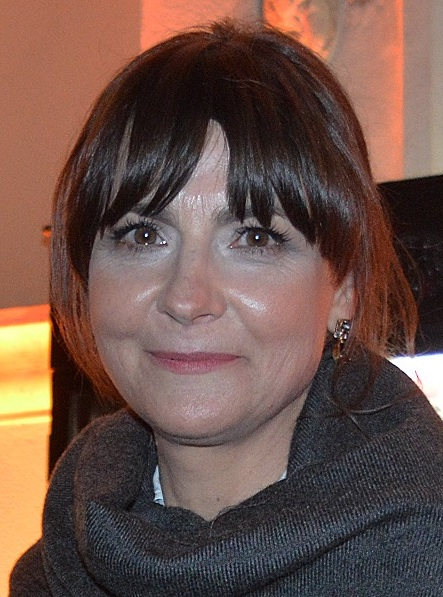
- Suchora in 2018
- Born: 10 January 1968 (age 58); Lublin, Poland
- Occupation: Actor
- Spouse: Krzysztof Kowalewski (m. 2002–2021)

Agnieszka Antonina Suchora (born 10 January 1968) is a Polish actress. Her film credits include Silent Night and My Name Is Ki. Her television work includes Sama słodycz and Plebania.

In 2018, Surchora won a Best Supporting Actress Polish Film Award for her work in Silent Night.

Suchora was married to actor Krzysztof Kowalewski until his death, in 2021.

== Selected filmography ==
=== Film ===
List of film appearances, with year, title, and role shown
Year	Title	Role	Notes
2011	My Name Is Ki	Goska "Go"	
2017	Silent Night	Teresa, Adam's mother	
2021	Operation Hyacinth	Ewa	

=== Television ===
List of television appearances, with year, title, and role shown
Year	Title	Role	Notes
2004	Rodzinka	Dorota Leszczynska	16 episodes
2004–2011	Daleko od noszy	Nurse Barbara Es	
2005	Na dobre i na złe	Krystyna Michalska	1 episode
2006	Niania	woman	1 episode
2011	Plebania	Jola	5 episodes
2011	Daleko od noszy. Szpital futpolowy	Nurse Barbara Es	12 episodes
2014	Ojciec Mateusz	Lucyna Walus	1 episode
2014	Sama słodycz	Ula	7 episodes
2017	Daleko od noszy. Reanimacja	Nurse Barbara Es	12 episodes
2017	The Chairman's Ear	TV journalist	1 episode
2017	Ultraviolet	Sylwia Jagoda	1 episode
2018–2019	Na Wspólnej	Anna Budzynska	25 episodes
2019	Wataha	Iwona Gauza	2 episodes
2019	Pod powierzchnią	Psychologist Stanko	3 episodes
2019–2021	Pierwsza miłość	Anna Radziwill	91 episodes
2020	Ludzie i bogowie	"Kurka"	3 episodes
2022	Family Secrets	Teresa	8 episodes
