= Hanna Śleszyńska =

Polish actress (born 1959)

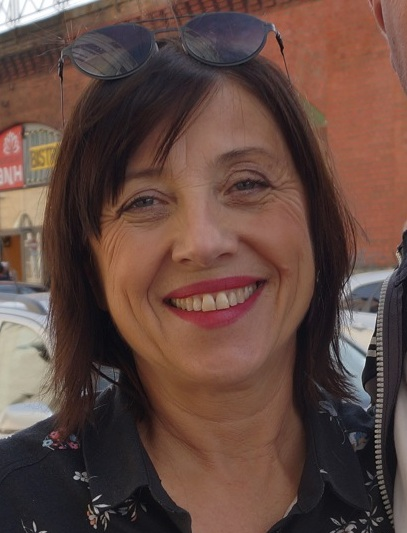
- Hanna Śleszyńska
- Born: 11 April 1959 (age 67); Warsaw, Poland
- Occupation: Actress
- Years active: 1980–present

Hanna Śleszyńska (born 11 April 1959 in Warsaw) is a Polish film, television and theater actress.

She is best known for playing the role of cousin Jadzia in Polish TV series Rodzina zastępcza (Foster Family) and sister Genowefa Basen in Daleko od noszy (English Off the Stretcher).

== Biography ==
In 1982 she graduated from the Aleksander Zelwerowicz State Theatre Academy in Warsaw. Her first theater performance was in Niebo zawiedzionych (Sky of the Disappointed) of Bertolt Brecht directed by Lena Szurmiej on the stage of the Ateneum Theatre.

In 2005 she participated in the show Taniec z gwiazdami (Dancing with the Stars). Her dance partner was Michał Szuba. They took the 9th place.

== Personal life ==
She was in a relationship with Piotr Gąsowski. They were a couple for several years. She is now in a relationship with Jacek Brzosko.

== Selected filmography ==
=== Actress ===
- 1980: Lęk przestrzeni as Dorota
- 1995: Awantura o Basię (Argument About Basia) as Marcysia
- 1997: Boża podszewka as Józia Jurewicz
- 2000: Graczykowie as Barbara Oberman
- 2001–2003: Szpital na perypetiach as sister Genowefa Basen
- 2001–2009: Rodzina zastępcza (Foster Family) as cousin Jadzia
- 2002: Plebania as Alina Bednarkowa, mother of Renata and Marek
- 2003–2011: Daleko od noszy (English Off the Stretcher) as sister Genowefa Basen
- 2007: Ja wam pokażę! as Jagoda
- 2009: Grzeszni i bogaci (Sins of Love) as Rołz
- 2009: Magiczne drzewo as aunt Maryla Gruber

=== Dubbing in Polish ===
- 2004: The Incredibles as Malina
- 2008: Fly Me to the Moon as Nadia
