= Paweł Wawrzecki =

Polish actor

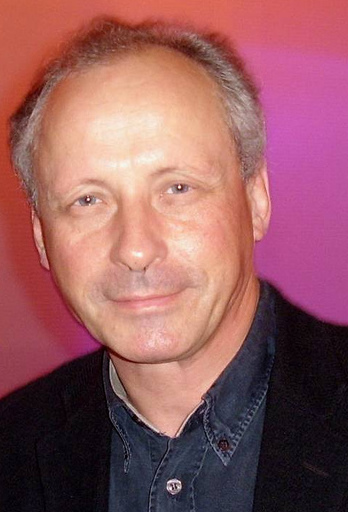
Paweł Wawrzecki

Paweł Wawrzecki (born February 12, 1950, in Warsaw) is a Polish actor and the son of Stanisław Wawrzecki. He left The Aleksander Zelwerowicz National Academy of Dramatic Art in Warsaw in 1975. He appeared in the television series Aby do świtu... in 1992. He has been the host of Koło Fortuny, the Polish version of Wheel of Fortune, since 1995. He is best known for his roles in TV series: Złotopolscy, Graczykowie, Graczykowie, czyli Buła, Buła i spóła, Daleko od noszy and Kowalski kontra Kowalski.
