= Medical director =

Person in charge of medical practice

A medical director is a physician who provides guidance and leadership on the use of medicine in a healthcare organization. These include the emergency medical services, hospital departments, blood banks, clinical teaching services, and others. A medical director devises the protocols and guidelines for the clinical staff and evaluates them while they are in use.

== Emergency medical services ==
The role of a medical director in the emergency medical services (EMS) varies by which type of system is in use.

=== Franco-German model ===
The first model, arguably the oldest, is generally described as the Franco-German model. This model is physician-led, and those personnel who serve emergencies from ambulances are often place in minor, supporting roles. There is ample evidence indicating that at the turn of the 20th century, many North American hospital-based ambulances in larger centres were staffed by ambulance surgeons; physicians who responded in the ambulance and provided care in a manner which very much resembles the current Franco-German model. In the French version of the model, only physicians and nurses perform advanced care, and ambulance drivers have only minimal medical training.

In the German version of the model, there are paramedics (called Rettungsassistenten). Medical control is on-line, immediate, and direct. The training of the Rettungsassistent is comparable to that of many North American paramedics, but they may be limited in their scope of practice. Paramedics may practice advanced life support skills at all times when the physician with whom they work is physically present. In some cases they are restricted in action if there is no physician present, a legal position mostly claimed by the physicians' lobby. Under German law, unless an immediately life-threatening or potentially debilitating emergency is present, such individuals may be limited to basic life support skills only, or to restricted ALS skills, which are defined in the "standing orders" of the medical director of each respective county. In 2003, there was a reform movement to expand the "standing competency", especially in the realm of pain treatment, by offering additional training to the level of "Notfallsanitaeter".

This model is intended to bring physician-centred definitive care to the patient, rather than bringing the patient to the care. As a result, in addition to conventional ambulances, most communities have physicians (called Notarzt) who respond directly to every life-threatening call to provide care. This system does not recognize emergency medicine as a medical specialty in the sense that North Americans understand it. In these cases, the "emergency physician" is most commonly an anesthetist, or sometimes an internist or a surgeon. In most areas of Europe, there appears to be little interest in developing emergency medicine as a specialty, although recent developments in Italy suggest that this attitude may be changing. In this model, long "at scene" times are common. The physician attempts to provide some or all of the intervention that is necessary in place, with transportation to hospital occurring only for those with a legitimate need of a hospital bed, and urgent transportation to hospital being extremely rare. Many patients will never be transported to hospital. In the French version of this model, even the triage of incoming requests for service is physician-led, with a physician, assisted by others, interviewing the caller and determining what type of response resource, if any, will be sent. The German version of this model uses "conventional" dispatch processes, with the physician being sent to calls as requested by the EMS dispatcher.

The Franco-German model operates in most places in Europe and Russia, but not in the United Kingdom. In this model, the medical director is typically more of a leader of physicians, and an advisor on the training of, and quality control for, subordinate staff. In Germany, the term Ärztlicher Leiter Rettungsdienst is used. This physician's role is to oversee EMS personnel in a defined area, typically a bigger city or county, and it corresponds to the position of medical director in North America.

In Sweden, the position of medical director at hospitals and clinics is referred to as Huvudläkaren, literally "the head physician".

=== Anglo-American ===
The Anglo-American model of care is largely led by the medical director. This model has evolved significantly since its origins in the late 1960s. The development of this role, the professionalization of emergency medical services, the profession of paramedic, and the medical specialty of emergency medicine, have all developed in a symbiotic relationship since the early years. Prior to 1979, there was no formal specialty training certification for emergency medicine. Prior to 1970, there was no concerted effort to formally train physicians in its practice in the U.S. In the U.K., formal consultancies in Emergency Medicine had existed for at least two decades before that time.

In the Anglo-American model of care, the physician remains the leader of the care team, but paramedics function much more independently than in the Franco-German model. This has not always been the case. In the earliest days of paramedicine, paramedics were required to contact a physician for formal orders for each intervention that they performed. Some specialists believed this was the only safe approach to providing care in this fashion. In some early cases, "paramedics" operated blindly, providing medications from numbered or colour-coded syringes as they were directed by the physician, with no real understanding of the actions they were performing. Control was absolute and immediate; there were examples of paramedics being trained, but not legally permitted to perform their skills, or in other cases, they could take action only with a physician or nurse present, much like the existing Franco-German model. In the earliest stages of paramedicine, the paramedics were not yet formally licensed and often served as an extension of the physician's medical license. The Canadian province of Ontario continues to have such a system, as of 2008. As the training, knowledge and skill level of paramedics increased, licensing, and certification were formalized, and physicians became more comfortable in working with this new profession; then paramedics were permitted greater degrees of independent practice. In the 21st century, most paramedics function based on complex written protocols or standing orders committed to memory, often numerous pages in length, and contact a physician only when standing orders have been exhausted.

In such systems, the medical director's role takes on several aspects. To begin with, the medical director is much more a leader of paramedics than of other physicians. They generally perform a leadership role among the small group of physicians tasked with providing delegation to paramedics in the field.

The medical director plays a key role in the professional development of paramedics as well. In almost all cases, the medical director will have, at a minimum, input into the curriculum of paramedic training at a local level. In a great many cases, they will also teach some portions of the program, supervise clinical rotations of paramedics, and in some cases, precept their initial field practice prior to formal certification or licensing. In almost all cases, the medical director will be charged with the creation of all protocols and standing orders, and with any research that goes into their creation. The medical director will also, assisted by others, be responsible for the creation and development of the Standards of Practice for their EMS system. Throughout the paramedic's career, the medical director will provide the mechanism for medical quality control, conducting chart audits and reviewing medically related service complaints, and may often have the ability to de-certify individual paramedics for cause. Medical directors will also act as advocates for their paramedics, advising elected officials and building support within the medical community for expanded scopes of practice when appropriate. Finally, medical directors will act as expert advisors to those in the EMS system administration and government administration, with respect to policies and legislation required by the EMS system, and in guiding its future direction. In this model, the paramedic is very much seen as an "extender" of the emergency physician's reach. It is rare to see physicians in the field, unless they are precepting new paramedics or performing quality assurance activities, or are residents in emergency medicine training programs, gaining required field experience or conducting research. Medical directors and ED physicians will occasionally go into the field for large incidents, such as multi victim accidents and disasters to assume on site medical command.

=== Autonomous practice ===
In some parts of the world, most notably the U.K., Australia and South Africa some paramedics have evolved into a role of autonomous practitioners in their own right. In such cases, individual paramedics may function in much the same manner as Physician assistants or Nurse Practitioners, assessing patients and making their own diagnoses, clinical judgments, and treatment decisions. In all such cases, a scope of practice is predetermined for the role, and within that scope of practice all treatment decisions are made and care rendered at the discretion of the individual paramedic. In many cases, the scope of practice will focus more heavily on primary care, although providing a more comprehensive level of care, such as suturing, or the management of long-term conditions, such as diabetes or hypertension, than is normally permitted to the paramedic. In some jurisdictions, such practitioners even have the authority to both prescribe and dispense a limited and defined set of medications.

In such circumstances, these Paramedic Practitioners or Emergency Care Practitioners are almost always very senior and experienced ALS providers, and retain their ability to practice these skills. In many cases, the practice of these individuals has gone well beyond what we normally consider to be the role of traditional EMS. There are locations in which these practitioners are providing ER leadership after hours in small, rural hospitals (Australia and the U.K.), while in other locations these practitioners are actually taking night calls for group medical practices (U.K.). In some cases, the practitioner retains the ability to summon a physician to the patient when the limits of the scope of practice are reached (U.K.) while in others, the finite limits of treatment are those within that scope of practice, and no physician "back-up" is normally provided (South Africa).

In this type of model, the role of the medical director includes the teaching of the practitioners, in both the classroom and the clinical setting. Most such training programs tend to feature very large components of hands-on clinical experience, generally conducted in the emergency room or similar environment, and usually in a one-to-one ratio with the physician. The medical director will be responsible for examination of the candidate and certification of their ability to practice safely. The medical director will have a major role in determining the permitted scope of practice, and will investigate practice-related complaints. In some jurisdictions, the medical director will be responsible for medical quality assurance, although there are some where this function is performed by the practitioners themselves. Finally, the medical director (or other emergency physicians) may be responsible for providing the required medical "back up" when the practitioner reaches the limit of their scope of practice.

=== Crossover models ===
There are some models, most notably the Netherlands, which use a blend of a number of these models, including the Franco-German, Anglo-American, and Autonomous Practice models. In the Netherlands, for example, all paramedics are in fact registered nurses with one year of additional training, usually in anesthesia but other critical care training is also acceptable, who then complete an additional year of training in ambulance care. All such individuals are licensed by the Dutch Ambulance Institute (DIA), and are employed by one of approximately 45 private companies providing emergency ambulance service under government contract.

The model looks very much Anglo-American on its surface; however, in most cases Dutch paramedics are for all practical purposes autonomous practitioners. The scope of practice and permissible procedures are determined at a national level by the Dutch Ambulance Institute, and all paramedics must function within this guidance. Within the scope of practice, however, all judgment and treatment decisions fall to the paramedic, as in the Autonomous Practitioner model. Each ambulance service is required to employ a medical manager whose role is oversight and quality assurance, and who may be contacted for directions by any paramedic who has reached the limits of their scope of practice, just as in the Anglo-American model. When necessary, however, the paramedic may request a rapid response by a physician, usually by either vehicle or helicopter. In these cases, a great deal of emergency intervention will occur on the scene, with the patient transported ultimately by land ambulance, as in the Franco-German model.

In this model, which is unique, the role of the medical director is substantially different. Scope of practice and all treatment protocols are developed by the Dutch Ambulance Institute on a national basis, and cannot be unilaterally changed at the local level by individual physicians. Scope and protocols are reviewed, revised, and announced every four years, and any physician who wishes a change to those protocols must provide sound reasons and present a successful argument before a committee of the DIA. The medical managers for each private carrier operate in a role approximating that of medical director, but only for that one company; their authority does not extend to other companies operating in the same community. These individuals do perform quality service functions such as chart audits and complaint investigation, but they cannot unilaterally change treatment protocols. They may provide guidance, advice, and direction to paramedics by telephone or radio, or they may attend the scene in person to provide care. The Dutch system also operates a network of four helicopters staffed by physicians for rapid response to support paramedics in the field. While many of the individuals working in the Dutch system may be occasionally described as "emergency physicians", the majority, as in the Franco-German model, are actually anesthetists.

== Notable medical directors ==
- Daniel Amen of the Amen Clinics
- Nancy Caroline – co-founder of Freedom House, one of the first EMS medical directors in America, and first formal medical director of the Magen David Adom (Israeli EMS).
- Leonard Cobb – founding medical director, Seattle, Washington, 'Medic One' paramedic program.
- R Adams Cowley – founding medical director of America's first dedicated trauma centre (ShockTrauma — Baltimore) and of the first dedicated air ambulance operation in the U.S. (Maryland State Police). Creator of the concept of the Golden Hour for trauma care.
- Norman McSwain – founding medical director of the New Orleans paramedic training program and New Orleans Police EMS Detail (now New Orleans EMS), inventor of the McSwain Dart (for paramedic emergency management of tension pneumothorax).
- Eugene Nagel – founding medical director, Miami, Florida paramedic program.
- Peter Safar – credited as the inventor of CPR and the Intensive Care Unit, and founding medical director of the Freedom House Ambulance Service (America's first paramedic ambulance service).
- Jullette Saussy – medical director of New Orleans Emergency Medical Services and a nationally recognized female leader in emergency medical services.
- Ronald Stewart – founding medical director, Los Angeles County paramedic program, Pittsburgh EMS, substantial role in the founding of Toronto, Ontario, Canada, paramedic program, and Nova Scotia, Canada, paramedic program.

== See also ==
- Emergency medicine
- Emergency physician
- Emergency room
