= Piotr Gąsowski =

Polish actor, comedian, and presenter

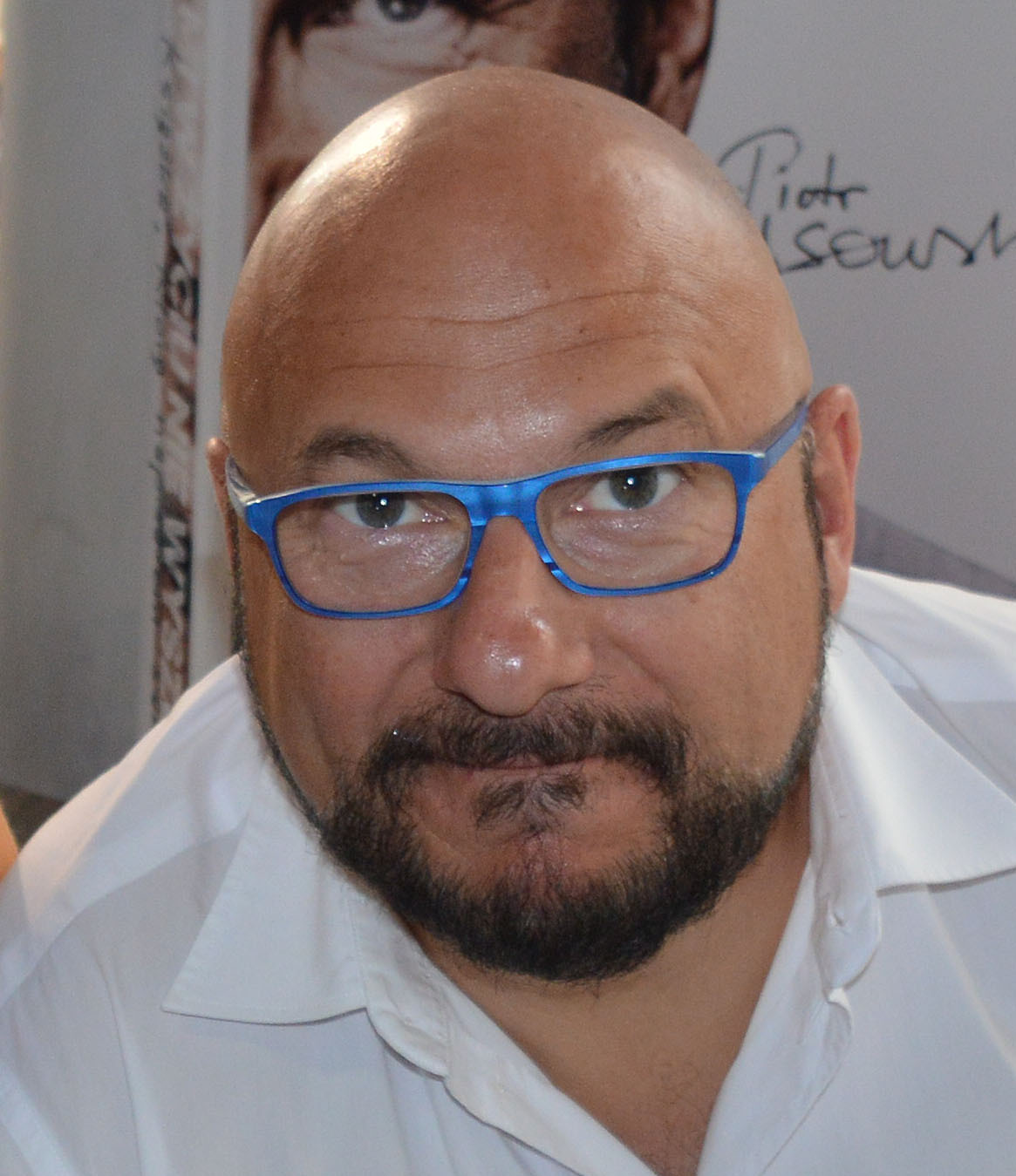
- Piotr Gąsowski
- Born: 16 April 1964 (age 61); Mielec, Poland
- Occupations: Television presenter, Journalist, Actor
- Years active: 1986–present

Piotr Włodzimierz Gąsowski (born 16 April 1964, in Mielec) is a Polish actor, comedian and presenter. He appeared in the television series Aby do świtu... in 1992.
