= Telecameras =

Telekamery
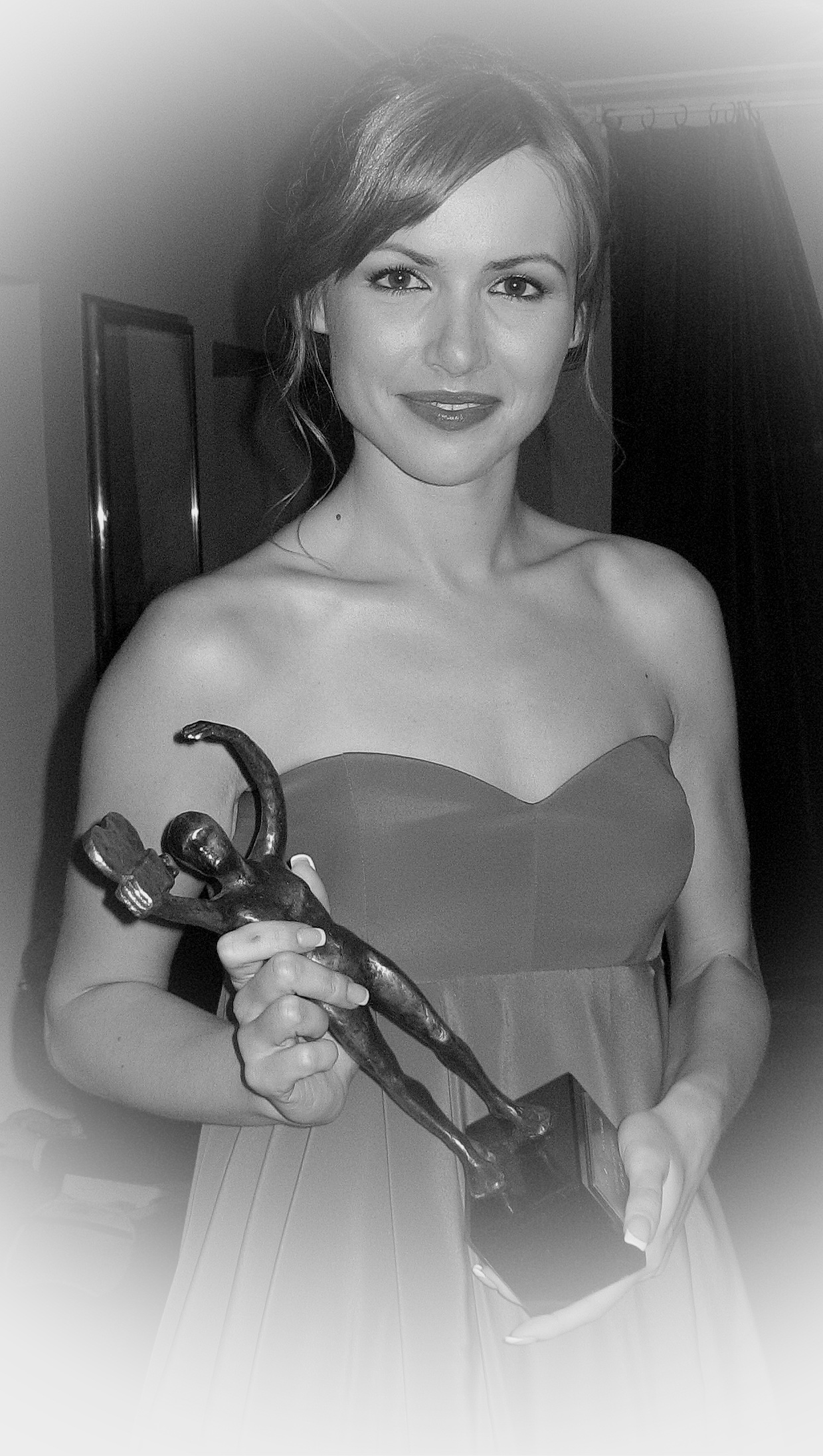
- Marta Żmuda Trzebiatowska with her 2009 Telekamery award
- Awarded for: Excellence in the television industry
- Country: Poland
- Presented by: TeleTydzień magazine
- First award: January 16, 1998; 28 years ago
- Website: www.telekamery.pl

The Telecameras are Polish awards presented annually by TeleTydzień magazine since 1998. Its ceremonies were broadcast by TVP2 between 1998–2009 and 2015–2016, and by TV Puls between 2020 and 2023. The 2010 ceremony was streamed via Interia.pl. In other years, ceremonies were not broadcast.

The winners of three Telekamerys are honoured with a Golden Telekamery Award, and cannot be nominated for an award anymore meaning one person/show/channel can win up to three Telekamerys.

== Winners ==
=== 1998 ===
Category	Winner
Entertainment	Zygmunt Chajzer
Journalist	Krystyna Czubówna
TV Series / Film	Ekstradycja
Actress	Krystyna Janda
Actor	Marek Kondrat
Singer	Natalia Kukulska

=== 1999 ===
Category	Winner
Quiz and Game Shows	Zygmunt Chajzer
News	Krystyna Czubówna
Entertainment	Marcin Daniec
Opinion Journalism	Elżbieta Jaworowicz
TV Series	Klan
Talk Show	Wojciech Mann
Actor	Cezary Pazura
Singer	Maryla Rodowicz
Actress	Anna Seniuk
Sports Commentator	Włodzimierz Szaranowicz
Presenters	Grażyna Torbicka

=== 2000 ===
Category	Winner
News	Krystyna Czubówna
Entertainment	Marcin Daniec
Talk Show	Wojciech Jagielski
Quiz and Game Shows	Robert Janowski
Opinion Journalism	Elżbieta Jaworowicz
TV Series	Klan
Actress	Agnieszka Kotulanka
Actor	Tomasz Stockinger
Sport	Włodzimierz Szaranowicz
Presenters	Grażyna Torbicka

=== 2001 ===
Category	Winner
News	Krystyna Czubówna
Entertainment	Marcin Daniec
Actress	Małgorzata Foremniak
Talk Show	Wojciech Jagielski
Opinion Journalism	Elżbieta Jaworowicz
TV Comedy	Świat według Kiepskich
Presenters	Grażyna Torbicka
Quiz and Game Shows	Hubert Urbański
TV Series	Na dobre i na złe
Actor	Artur Żmijewski

=== 2002 ===
Category	Winner
News	Kamil Durczok
News	Tomasz Lis
Actress	Małgorzata Foremniak
Entertainment	Krzysztof Ibisz
Comedy TV Series	Świat według Kiepskich
Opinion Journalism	Waldemar Milewicz
TV Series	Na dobre i na złe
Actor	Artur Żmijewski
Success of the Year	Adam Małysz

=== 2003 ===
Category	Winner
Opinion Journalism	Kamil Durczok
Actress	Małgorzata Foremniak
Show	Krzysztof Ibisz
Quiz Show	Robert Janowski
News	Jolanta Pieńkowska
Comedy TV Series	Kasia i Tomek
TV Series	Na dobre i na złe
Actor	Artur Żmijewski

=== 2004 ===
Category	Winner
Entertainment	Kevin Aiston
Entertainment	Steffen Möller
Opinion Journalism	Ewa Drzyzga
Actress	Małgorzata Kożuchowska
TV Series	M jak miłość
News	Jolanta Pieńkowska
Music	Ryszard Rynkowski
Comedy TV Series	Kasia i Tomek
Actor	Paweł Wilczak

=== 2005 ===
Category	Winner
Talk Show	Ewa Drzyzga
Actress	Małgorzata Kożuchowska
Music	Krzysztof Krawczyk
TV Series	M jak miłość
Opinion Journalism	Monika Olejnik
News	Maciej Orłoś
Actor	Witold Pyrkosz
Entertainment	Monika Zamachowska

=== 2006 ===
Category	Winner
Actor	Piotr Adamczyk
Social-Intervention Programme	Ewa Drzyzga
News	Kamil Durczok
Actress	Agnieszka Dygant
Crime TV Series	Kryminalni
Opinion Journalism	Tomasz Lis
Entertainment	Szymon Majewski
TV Series	M jak miłość
Music	Doda
Crime Pseudo-Documentary TV Series	W11 – Wydział Śledczy

=== 2007 ===
Category	Winner
Sketch Comedy	Ani Mru-Mru
Actress	Joanna Brodzik
News	Kamil Durczok
Crime Series	Kryminalni
Slice of Life TV Series	Magda M.
Entertainment	Szymon Majewski
Actor	Paweł Małaszyński
Opinion Journalism	Andrzej Morozowski
Opinion Journalism	Tomasz Sekielski
Comedy Series	Niania
Music	Piotr Rubik

=== 2008 ===
Category	Winner
Actress	Agnieszka Dygant
Music	Feel
Entertainment	Robert Janowski
Crime and Action Series	Kryminalni
Actor	Paweł Małaszyński
SuperTelekamera	Paweł Małaszyński
Opinion Journalism	Andrzej Morozowski
Opinion Journalism	Tomasz Sekielski
Comedy Series	Niania
News	Justyna Pochanke
Sports Commentator	Włodzimierz Szaranowicz
Slice of Life TV Series	Na Wspólnej

=== 2009 ===
Category	Winner
Music	Feel
Actor	Tomasz Karolak
Sports Commentator	Maciej Kurzajewski
Entertainment Personality	Szymon Majewski
News	Justyna Pochanke
Comedy Series	Ranczo
Opinion Journalism	Bogdan Rymanowski
Slice of Life TV Series	Barwy szczęścia
Entertainment Show	Mam talent!
Actress	Marta Żmuda Trzebiatowska

=== 2010 ===
Category	Winner
News and Business TV Channel	TVN24
Actor	Filip Bobek
Adapted Foreign TV Series	Brzydula
Popular Science TV Channel	National Geographic Channel
Sports TV Channel	Eurosport
Weather Presenter	Dorota Gardias
Foreign TV Series	House
Actress	Julia Kamińska
Sports Commentator	Maciej Kurzajewski
Quiz Show	Jaka to melodia?
Music	Andrzej Piaseczny
Film TV Channel	HBO Poland
Children's TV Channel	Disney Channel Poland
Original Polish TV Series	Barwy szczęścia
Entertainment	Mam talent!
News and Entertainment Personality	Anita Werner

=== 2011 ===
Category	Winner
News and Business TV Channel	TVN24
Actor	Piotr Adamczyk
Popular Science and Culture TV Channel	Discovery Channel Poland
Music	Agnieszka Chylińska
Sports Commentator	Maciej Kurzajewski
Entertainment Personality	Zenon Laskowik
Entertainment Personality	Waldemar Malicki
Weekly TV Series	Ojciec Mateusz
Entertainment Show	Jaka to melodia?
Film TV Channel	Kino Polska
Children's TV Channel	Disney Channel Poland
Opinion TV Show	Magazyn Ekspresu Reporterów
Sports TV Channel	Polsat Sport
Daily TV Series	Barwy szczęścia
Actress	Katarzyna Zielińska
News Personality	Krzysztof Ziemiec

=== 2012 ===
Category	Winner
News and Business TV Channel	TVN24
Actor	Piotr Adamczyk
Sports Commentator	Mateusz Borek
Film TV Channel	Comedy Central Poland
Children's TV Channel	Disney Channel Poland
Popular Science and Culture TV channel	Discovery Channel Poland
TV Personality	Magda Gessler
TV Series	Czas honoru
TV Judge	Robert Kozyra
Weather Presenter	Jarosław Kret
Entertainment Show	Jaka to melodia?
Actress	Maja Ostaszewska
Intervention TV Show	Magazyn Ekspresu Reporterów
Sports TV Channel	Polsat Sport
News Presenter	Krzysztof Ziemiec

=== 2013 ===
Category	Winner
News and Business TV Channel	TVN24
Film and TV Series Channel	AXN
Sports Commentator	Przemysław Babiarz
Actor	Marek Bukowski
Weather Presenter	Agnieszka Cegielska
Popular Science and Culture TV Channel	National Geographic Channel
Entertainment Show	Kabaretowy Klub Dwójki
Sports TV Channel	Eurosport
Weekly TV Series	Czas honoru
TV Judge	Robert Kozyra
Children's TV Channel	MiniMini+
Lifestyle TV Channel	TV Puls
Intervention TV Show	Magazyn Ekspresu Reporterów
TV Personality	Tadeusz Sznuk
Daily TV Series	Na Wspólnej
Actress	Katarzyna Zielińska
News Presenter	Krzysztof Ziemiec

=== 2014 ===
Category	Winner
Actress	Kamilla Baar
Sports Commentator	Przemysław Babiarz
Actor	Marek Bukowski
Weather Presenter	Agnieszka Cegielska
TV Judge	Agnieszka Chylińska
TV Series	Czas honoru
Entertainment Show	The Voice of Poland
Pseudo-Documentary Series	W11 – Wydział Śledczy
TV Personality	Tadeusz Sznuk
News Presenter	Andrzej Turski
TeleTydzień Special Award	HBO
TeleTydzień Special Award	TV Puls
TeleTydzień Special Award	Polsat Sport

=== 2015 ===
Category	Winner
Sports Commentator	Przemysław Babiarz
Weather Presenter	Agnieszka Cegielska
TV Judge	Agnieszka Chylińska
Music	Sylwia Grzeszczak
Actress	Barbara Kurdej-Szatan
News Presenter	Jarosław Kuźniar
TV Series	Ranczo
Pseudo-Documentary Series	Na sygnale
TV Personality	Tadeusz Sznuk
Actor	Michał Żebrowski
Entertainment Show	Rolnik szuka żony
TeleTydzień Special Award	HBO
TeleTydzień Special Award	TV Puls

=== 2016 ===
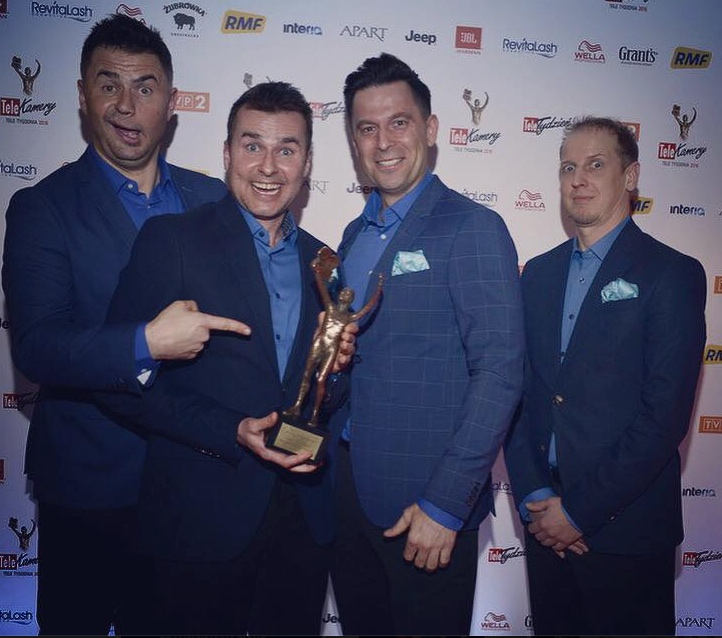
Paranienormalni with their 2016 Telekamery award for Entertainment show

Category	Winner
TV Judge	Agustin Egurrola
Weather Presenter	Aleksandra Kostka
Actress	Barbara Kurdej-Szatan
Hope of TV	Maciej Musiał
News Presenter	Maciej Orłoś
TV Series	Ranczo
Docufiction Series	Na sygnale
Sports Commentator	Dariusz Szpakowski
Entertainment Show	Paranienormalni Tonight
TV Personality	Martyna Wojciechowska
Actor	Michał Żebrowski

=== 2017 ===
Category	Winner
TV Judge	Agustin Egurrola
Actress	Barbara Kurdej-Szatan
TV Series	Ojciec Mateusz
Docufiction Series	Na sygnale
Sports Commentator	Dariusz Szpakowski
News Presenter	Anita Werner
TV Personality	Martyna Wojciechowska
Hope of TV	Marcelina Zawadzka
Actor	Michał Żebrowski
Entertainment Show	Rolnik szuka żony
Weather Presenter	Marzena Słupkowska

=== 2018 ===
Category	Winner
Hope of TV	Filip Chajzer
TV Series	Diagnoza
Docufiction Series	Lombard. Życie pod zastaw
Actress	Maja Ostaszewska
Actor	Mikołaj Roznerski
Weather Presenter	Marzena Słupkowska
TV Judge	Michał Szpak
Sports Commentator	Dariusz Szpakowski
Entertainment Show	Twoja twarz brzmi znajomo
News Presenter	Anita Werner
TV Personality	Martyna Wojciechowska

=== 2019 ===
Category	Winner
Actress	Joanna Kulig
Actor	Mikołaj Roznerski
TV Series	Ojciec Mateusz
Docufiction Series	Lombard. Życie pod zastaw
News Presenter	Tomasz Wolny
TV Personality	Dorota Szelągowska
TV Judge	Dawid Kwiatkowski
Entertainment Show	Twoja twarz brzmi znajomo
Sports Commentator	Jerzy Mielewski
Weather Presenter	Paulina Sykut-Jeżyna
Netfilm Award	Ślepnąc od świateł
Person of the Year	Bartosz Kurek
Success of the Year	Niepodległość

=== 2020 ===
Category	Winner
Actress	Kinga Preis
Actor	Mikołaj Roznerski
TV Series	Zawsze warto
Docufiction Series	Lombard. Życie pod zastaw
TV Personality	Rafał Brzozowski
News Presenter	Tomasz Wolny
Weather Presenter	Paulina Sykut-Jeżyna
Sports Commentator	Jerzy Mielewski
TV Judge	Baron and Tomson
Entertainment Show	The Voice Kids
Netfilm Award	Chernobyl
Person of the Year	Robert Lewandowski
Production of the Year	Tylko nie Mów nikomu
TeleTydzień Special Award	Ojciec Mateusz
TeleTydzień Special Award	Henryk Gołębiewski
Film and TV Series Channel	Canal+

=== 2021 ===
Category	Winner
Actress	Małgorzata Socha
Actor	Maciej Stuhr
TV Series	BrzydUla
Docufiction Series	Sprawiedliwi – Wydział Kryminalny
TV Personality	Przemysław Kossakowski
News Presenter	Piotr Kraśko
Weather Presenter	Bartłomiej Jędrzejak
Sports Commentator	Jerzy Mielewski
TV Judge	Cleo
Entertainment Show	Nasz nowy dom
Netfilm Award	Wataha season 3

=== 2022 – 25th Anniversary ===
Category	Winner
Actress of Last 25 Years	Kinga Preis
Actor of Last 25 Years	Artur Żmijewski
TV Series of Last 25 Years	Ranczo
Docufiction Series of Last 25 Years	Lombard. Życie pod zastaw
TV Personality of Last 25 Years	Tadeusz Sznuk
News Presenter of Last 25 Years	Anita Werner
Opinion Journalist of Last 25 Years	Elżbieta Jaworowicz
Weather Presenter of Last 25 Years	Agnieszka Cegielska
Sports Commentator of Last 25 Years	Dariusz Szpakowski
TV Judge of Last 25 Years	Baron and Tomson
Entertainment Show of Last 25 Years	Rolnik szuka żony
Specialty TV Channel of Last 25 Years	Polsat Sport
Netfilm Award	Rojst '97
Person of the Year	Wanda Traczyk-Stawska
Production of the Year	Żeby nie było śladów
Special Telekamery Award	Kino Polska
Special Telekamery Award	TVP Kobieta

=== 2023 ===
Category	Winner
Actress	Agata Załęcka
Actor	Andrzej Młynarczyk
TV Series	Skazana
News / Opinion Journalism	Wojciech Bojanowski
Sports Commentator / Presenter / Journalist	Wojciech Drzyzga and Tomasz Swędrowski
TV Show Presenter / Host	Katarzyna Cichopek and Maciej Kurzajewski
TV Judge	Baron and Tomson
Entertainment show	Nasz nowy dom
Netfilm Award	Wielka woda

=== 2024 ===
Category	Winner
Actress	Vanessa Aleksander
Actor	Filip Gurłacz
TV Series	1670
News / Opinion Journalism	Diana Rudnik
Sports Commentator / Presenter / Journalist	Paulina Chylewska
TV Judge	Ewa Kasprzyk
Entertainment show	Twoja twarz brzmi znajomo
Tele Tydzień's Revelation	Eryk Kulm

== Golden Telekamery Awards ==
Year	Winner
2002	Marcin Daniec; Grażyna Torbicka; Elżbieta Jaworowicz; Krystyna Czubówna
2004	Na dobre i na złe Artur Żmijewski; Małgorzata Foremniak
2007	M jak miłość Ewa Drzyzga
2008	Kamil Durczok
2009	Włodzimierz Szaranowicz; Robert Janowski; Kryminalni
2010	Szymon Majewski
2012	Maciej Kurzajewski; Barwy szczęścia
2013	Piotr Adamczyk; TVN24; Disney Channel Poland; Jaka to melodia?
2014	Krzysztof Ziemiec; Magazyn Ekspresu Reporterów
2015	Czas honoru Polsat Sport
2016	Przemysław Babiarz; Agnieszka Chylińska; Tadeusz Sznuk; Agnieszka Cegielska; TV Puls; HBO Poland
2017	Ranczo
2018	Barbara Kurdej-Szatan; Michał Żebrowski; Na sygnale
2019	Martyna Wojciechowska; Anita Werner; Dariusz Szpakowski
2020	Ojciec Mateusz
2022	Jerzy Mielewski
