= Strachota =

Strachota (Czech feminine: Strachotová) is a surname. Notable people with the surname include:

- Franz Strachota (1918–2009), Austrian field hockey player
- Grażyna Strachota (born 1960), Polish actress
- Patricia Strachota (born 1955), American politician
