= Fakty TVN =

- Also known as: Fakty, Facts
- Genre: Newscast
- Created by: Tomasz Lis; Grzegorz Miecugow
- Presented by: Anita Werner; Grzegorz Kajdanowicz; Piotr Kraśko; Piotr Marciniak; Diana Rudnik
- Theme music composer: Andrzej Smolik (2012–present)
- Country of origin: Poland
- Original language: Polish

Production
- Production location: Media Business Centre
- Editors: Grzegorz Jędrzejowski; Mariusz Tchórzewski; Robert Jastrzębski; Mariusz Rudnik
- Running time: 31 minutes (Monday-Thursday); 26 minutes (Friday); 21 minutes (Saturday-Sunday)
- Production company: TVN S.A.

Original release
- Network: TVN; TVN24 BiS; TVN International
- Release: 3 October 1997 – present

Related
- Fakty po Faktach; Fakty po południu Fakty o świecie

Fakty TVN (simplified to Fakty; English: Facts) is the flagship newscast of TVN, one of Poland's major television networks. The programme was launched on 3 October 1997, which was also the first day of the entire TVN. As of May 2019, it has an average audience of 3.2 million viewers, making it Poland's most watched television newscast.

== History ==
The programme was created by two former TVP journalists, Grzegorz Miecugow and Tomasz Lis, with Lis serving as its original main presenter. It was the first news programme in Polish television based on the North American concept of "anchor" where presenter does not simply read the text prepared by others but he or she has vital influence on the overall shape of the programme. For the first 8 months of its existence, it was broadcast at 19:30 which made it compete directly with its main rival Wiadomości. In May 1998 it was moved to its current time slot at 19:00, enabling viewers to watch both programmes. For the first few years it used to have four regional versions with local news (broadcast from Warsaw, Łódź, Gdańsk and Kraków) but eventually those were cancelled. From 1997 till 2004 the late evening version was produced (airing usually around 23:00) and from 2000 till 2007 there was also the afternoon edition (airing around 17:00). Since 2007 the main edition broadcast from Warsaw (with presenters travelling during exceptional events) has been the only one being aired.

In 2004, Lis was fired by TVN's management (following an interview with the Polish edition of Newsweek in which when asked if he was interested in running for the President of Poland, he failed to give a clear "no"). He was replaced as main presenter by Bogdan Rymanowski. In the same year the programme's team was merged into TVN24, network's 24-hour news channel and the two started to share the newsroom and main studio. Fakty did retain some level of autonomy though, keeping its own staff headed by a separate Editor-in-Chief. Since Autumn 2004, the programme has had two main presenters, each of them fronting the weekday editions every second week. For the first 20 months since the change those were Justyna Pochanke and Bogdan Rymanowski. In May 2006 former Wiadomości star presenter Kamil Durczok took over as one of the main presenters (replacing Rymanowski who fronted his last edition two months earlier) and was also nominated Fakty's Editor-in-Chief.

In May 2008, the weekday editions were expanded by adding Fakty po Faktach (Facts after the Facts) section, which is aired only on TVN24 (thus available only via cable and satellite networks, with no terrestrial transmission) and allows to get into more detail with the day's main stories by adding longer interviews and analysis. In the first weeks both sections were presented by the same person. Later this has been changed and now there is different host for each of the two parts. For the viewers who decide to stay with TVN after the programme instead of switching to TVN24, the programme is followed by weather and sport segments (both with their separate presenters). The entire block (including commercials between the segments) lasts for about 45 minutes.

== Opening and format ==
The programme begins with a camera shot covering the studio's videowall, on which a ticking clock is displayed. When it passes 19:00:00 sharply, the main ident begins, with a voice-over introduction of the presenter. The headlines are presented in front of the video wall. For the main segment, the presenter is seated behind his desk.

In addition to Kamil Durczok's overall responsibility for the programme as its Editor-in-Chief, each day's edition is supervised by two editors, who commission news stories etc. The presenter of any given edition automatically holds the position of one of its editors, while the other editor is always a senior member of the off-screen staff.

== Presenters and reporters ==
Each of the five presenters of the main programme is also a regular host of the follow-up interview show Fakty po Faktach. This programme also has a sixth presenter, Katarzyna Kolenda-Zaleska, who contributes to the main newscast as a senior political reporter.

=== Editors ===
- Michał Samul (editor-in-chief)
- Grzegorz Jędrzejowski (co-author of “Fakty TVN”)
- Mariusz Tchórzewski
- Robert Jastrzębski
- Mariusz Rudnik

=== Producers ===
- Agata Winczewska
- Krzysztof Zawistowski
- Mariusz Mieleszkiewicz
- Maciej Janiuk
- Krzysztof Dynel
- Grażyna Kaczmarczyk
- Katarzyna Jastrzębska
- Krzysztof Jastrzębski
- Daniel Bandura
- Iwona Widomska
- Bartosz Łada
- Monika Zasuwa
- Katarzyna Malicka

=== Former journalists ===
- Tomasz Lis (co-author of “Fakty TVN”)
- Kamil Durczok
- Marcin Pawłowski
- Roman Młodkowski
- Iwona Radziszewska
- Mirosław Rogalski
- Tomasz Sekielski
- Beata Tadla
- Patrycja Redo
- Grzegorz Miecugow (co-author of “Fakty TVN”)
- Anna Jędrzejowska
- Bogdan Rymanowski
- Dariusz Kmiecik
- Piotr Świerczek
- Tomasz Sianecki
- Karolina Hytrek-Prosiecka (correspondent for TVN24 Biznes i Świat)
- Justyna Pochanke

=== Presenters ===
- Anita Werner (2003–present)
- Grzegorz Kajdanowicz (2004–present)
- Piotr Marciniak (2005–present)
- Diana Rudnik (2017–present)
- Piotr Kraśko (2020–present)

=== Reporters ===
- Paweł Abramowicz (Wrocław)
- Jan Błaszkowski (Gdańsk)
- Renata Kijowska (Kraków)
- Maciej Knapik (Warsaw)
- Jarosław Kostkowski (Poznań)
- Marzanna Zielińska (Łódź)
- Dariusz Łapiński (Warsaw)
- Magda Łucyan (Warsaw)
- Maciej Mazur (Warsaw)
- Marek Nowicki (Warsaw)
- Jakub Sobieniowski (Warsaw)
- Katarzyna Kolenda-Zaleska (Warsaw)
- Katarzyna Górniak (Warsaw)
- Jacek Tacik (Warsaw)
- Michał Tracz (Warsaw)
- Paweł Szot (Katowice)
- Adrianna Otręba (Warsaw)
- Rafał Jutrznia (Warsaw)
- Magdalena Szepietowska (Warsaw)
- Wojciech Bojanowski (Warsaw)
- Anna Czerwińska (Warsaw)
- Katarzyna Sławińska (Warsaw)
- Maciej Sokołowski (Brussels)
- Monika Krajewska (Warsaw)
- Marcin Wrona (Washington, D.C.)
- Maciej Woroch (London)
- Andrzej Zaucha (Warsaw)
- Arleta Zalewska (Warsaw)

== Special editions ==
Special edition of Fakty on 10 April 2011 presented live from Smolensk by Kamil Durczok on the occasion of anniversary of Polish Air Force Tu-154 crash near Smolensk

When a very important event happens, TVN broadcasts a special edition of The Facts in order to provide full coverage of the topic. Depending on the importance of the event, the whole program can be dedicated to the topic or half of it. When it is presented from the studio, the presenter usually stands in front of a video wall. When an event occurs at weekend, the main program is presented by a male presenter, while a female presenter continues the coverage on The Facts After The Facts on TVN24. In some cases, the program is presented from the scene of the event and is completely dedicated to the topic.

So far since 2011, there have been 19 special editions of The Facts, including 7 presented from outside the studio.

=== List of special editions of The Facts from 2011 ===
Date	Event	Venue	Host
12 January 2011	MAK presents report of investigation of Polish Air Force Tu-154 crash near Smolensk in 2010	Studio	Kamil Durczok
11 March 2011	Earthquake and tsunami in Japan	Studio	Piotr Marciniak
10 April 2011	Anniversary of Polish Air Force Tu-154 crash near Smolensk	Smolensk	Kamil Durczok
1 May 2011	Beatification of Pope John Paul II	Vatican	Kamil Durczok
2 May 2011	Death of Osama bin Laden	Studio	Grzegorz Kajdanowicz
27 May 2011	Barack Obama visits Poland	Studio	Grzegorz Kajdanowicz
28 May 2011	Barack Obama visits Poland	Studio	Grzegorz Kajdanowicz
1 July 2011	First day of Polish Presidency of the Council of the European Union	Virtual studio	Kamil Durczok
23 July 2011	Norway attacks	Studio	Piotr Marciniak
29 July 2011	Presentation of the final report of the Tu-154M plane crash in Smoleńsk in 2010	Studio	Grzegorz Kajdanowicz
11 September 2011	Tenth anniversary of September 11 attacks	New York	Kamil Durczok
7 October 2011	End of Polish parliamentary campaign	Łowicz	Kamil Durczok
1 November 2011	Emergency landing at the Warsaw Chopin Airport	Studio	Grzegorz Kajdanowicz
11 November 2011	Violence disorder during Independence Marches in Warsaw	Studio	Piotr Marciniak
4 March 2012	Szczekociny train collision	Studio	Grzegorz Kajdanowicz
8 June 2012	UEFA Euro 2012 opening match	Warsaw	Kamil Durczok
16 June 2012	UEFA Euro 2012: Poland vs Czech Republic	Wrocław	Anita Werner
22 June 2012	UEFA Euro 2012: Germany vs Greece	Gdańsk	Kamil Durczok
1 July 2012	UEFA Euro 2012 Final	Virtual studio	Grzegorz Kajdanowicz
12 March 2013	Beginning of the papal conclave	Rome	Kamil Durczok
13 March 2013	Election of the new pope	Studio	Justyna Pochanke
13 March 2013	Election of the new pope	Rome	Kamil Durczok
30 July 2016	World Youth Day 2016	Kraków	Grzegorz Kajdanowicz
