= Kamil Durczok =

Polish journalist (1968–2021)

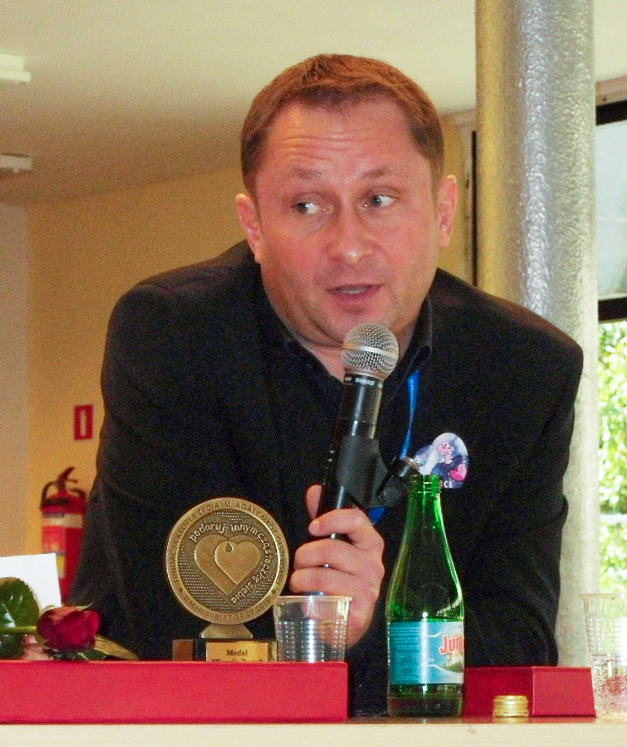
- Born: Kamil Sebastian Durczok; 3 August 1968; Katowice, Poland
- Died: 16 November 2021 (aged 53); Katowice, Poland
- Resting place: Cemetery at the parish of the Holy Trinity, Katowice
- Education: University of Silesia
- Occupation: Journalist
- Notable credit(s): Fakty TVN; Fakty po Faktach

Kamil Sebastian Durczok (6 March 1968 – 16 November 2021) was a Polish journalist, Editor-in-Chief, and presenter of TVN newscast Fakty TVN.

== Career ==
In 1991, Durczok started working in Radio Katowice. Earlier, he had co-created Student's Radio EGIDA at University of Silesia in Katowice for a few years. As a 24-year-old, he became director and editor-in-chief of Katowice radio TOP FM owned by Solidarity.

In 1994, he started cooperation with Telewizja Katowice, where he interviewed politicians in a program called Obserwatorium. In the program Studio Parlamentarne, he debuted in nationwide television. Then, he was the presenter of TVP3 Katowice newscast - Aktualności until 2002.

Between 15 March 2001 and 7 February 2006, he was the presenter of the main edition of Wiadomości - public television's newscast. He also presented election nights on TVP1 for many years.

Between 29 July 2003 and 2 September 2005, he presented Salon polityczny Trójki alternately with Jolanta Pieńkowska on Polish Radio Channel 3.

Between 5 September 2005 and 15 June 2007, he presented Kontrwywiad RMF FM alternately with Konrad Piasecki on radio RMF FM.

From 1 May 2006, he was Editor-in-Chief of TVN newscast Fakty TVN. He also presented Fakty po Faktach on TVN24 from 5 May 2008.

At the beginning of April 2016, he registered the Coal Minders company, which in August of the same year began looking for journalists. On 3 October 2016, the company launched the Upper Silesian information portal Silesion.pl. The website disappeared from the network at the end of April 2019 after information about problems with settling liabilities. After the website was closed, he was involved in conducting trainings in the field of actions in the event of an image crisis.

On 20 October 2016, he started cooperation with Polsat News, where he ran the program Brutalna prawda, Durczok ujawnia, which in the fall of 2017 changed its name to Durczokracja. The last program was broadcast on 14 December 2017, and it did not return to air in spring 2018.

In the following years, Kamil Durczok was active in social media, commenting on political life in Poland on an ongoing basis, and was involved in social activities. He was, inter alia, a volunteer of the "Wolne Miejsce" foundation, helping every year in the organization of Christmas Eve for those in need. In 2020, he participated in protests against the tightening of abortion laws.

In 2021, he launched the Durczokracja mobile application, in which he published his content.

== Death ==
He died on 16 November 2021, at the age of 53, the cause of death was exacerbation of a chronic disease. The funeral ceremony of Kamil Durczok took place at the cemetery at the parish of the Holy Trinity in Katowice-Kostuchna on 19 November 2021.

== Awards ==
- 2000 – Grand Press (Journalist of the Year) of Press magazine
- 2001 – Wiktor Publiczności for year 2000
- 2002 – Telekamera in category "Information" with Tomasz Lis
- 2003 – Telekamera in category "Journalism"
- 2003 – Award of TVP Director "Star of Polish Television"
- 2004 – Wiktor Publiczności for year 2003
- 2004 – Award of Foundation of Ksawery and Mieczysław Pruszyński
- 2005 – Wiktor Publiczności and Wiktor for the most rated journalist of the year 2004
- 2006 – Telekamera in category "Information"
- 2006 – Wiktor Publiczności for the year 2005
- 2007 – Telekamera in category "Information"
- 2007 – MediaTor in category "AuTORytet"
- 2008 – Złota Telekamera in category "Information"
- 2011 – Platynowy Laur Umiejętności i Kompetencji for year 2010 in category "Pro Publico Bono"
