= Hubert Urbański =

Polish actor, journalist and presenter

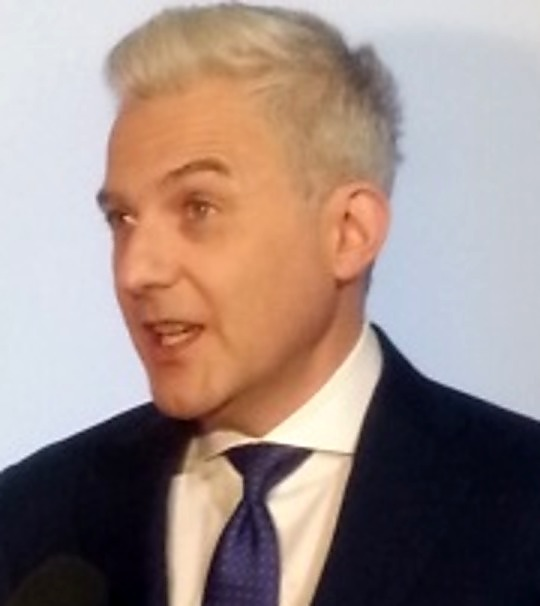
- Urbański in 2017
- Born: 23 March 1966 (age 60); Warsaw, Poland
- Occupations: Actor, journalist
- Years active: 1994–present
- Employer: Polsat (2025–present)
- Television: Milionerzy (1999–2003, 2008–2010, 2017–present)

Hubert Kirił Urbański (born 23 March 1966) is a Polish actor, journalist and presenter.

Urbański studied at Warsaw XIX lyceum of Warsaw Insurgents (Polish: L.O. im. Powstańców Warszawy), and then at the University of Warsaw, where he studied Hindi philosophy. He then began studies at the Aleksander Zelwerowicz State Theatre Academy in Warsaw.

Between 1994 and 1995, Urbański worked at Radio ZET and then at Radio Kolor, where he worked until 1998. He then worked at Radio Tok FM for a year. He began his television career by hosting the Antena at TVP, and Pyramid game show on Polsat. Since 1999, he has been working at TVN, hosting various shows including Jestem Jaki Jestem and Polish versions of the Dancing with the Stars, Survivor, and Who Wants to Be a Millionaire franchises. When Milionerzy swapped to Polsat in 2025, Urbański followed the show.

Urbański is the father of four daughters – Marianna, Krystyna, Stefania and Danuta. His father is Polish and his mother is Bulgarian.

== Filmography ==
- Bar Atlantic (1996) – announcer (voice)
- Miasteczko (2000–2001) – as himself, host of Milionerzy
- Król przedmieścia (2002) – as himself (voice)
- Kasia i Tomek (2002–2003) – tax adviser of Kasia and Tomek
- Vinci (2004) – walk-on person: he is the host of the auction, which is one of the most important scenes in the film (this scene was cut out by the director of the film, although it can be seen on the DVD version).
- Czas Honoru (2011) – as colonel Mieczysław Skotnicki
- Ojciec Mateusz (2015) – as chef Mikołaj Rębacki
- Pierwsza Miłość (2015) – as businessman Damian Skowronek
- Na dobre i na złe (2016) – as Andrzej
- Druga Szansa (2016) – as Hein

== Awards ==
- 2000 – a Wiktor award in television discovery of the year category.
- 2000 – the award of the ELLE magazine in discovery of the year.
- 2000 – a Telekamery award in the plebiscite of readers (category game shows and games).
- 2001 – a Telekamery award in the plebiscite of readers (category game shows and games).
- 2006 – 6th place on the most popular stars of Polish show–business list of Forbes magazine.
- 2006 – Złote Dzioby award of Radio WAWA in the Event of the Year category.
- 2006 – 2nd place with Katarzyna Skrzynecka in Telekamery award's plebiscite in Entertainment category.
- 2007 – 3rd place with Katarzyna Skrzynecka in Telekamery award's plebiscite in Entertainment category.

== Guest appearances ==
- On 11 April 2006 he was the guest of Duże dzieci (Big children).
- In October 2006 he was the guest of two episodes of Rozmowy w toku (Talks on-air).
- On 7 May 2007 he was the guest of Szymon Majewski Show (episode 57).
- On 23 December 2007 he was the guest in Kuba Wojewódzki Show.

== Advertisements ==
Since 4 May 2007, Hubert Urbański has advertised for Bank Millennium.
