= Zaucha =

Zaucha is a Polish surname. it is derived from a descriptive nickname "za uchem" which means ‘behind the ear’ denoting someone who had something behind one of his ears.

Notable people with the surname include:

- Andrzej Zaucha (disambiguation), multiple people
- Patryk Zaucha (born 2000), Polish footballer
