= Aleksander Zelwerowicz National Academy of Dramatic Art =

Polish theatre academy in Warsaw

Coordinates: 52°14′54″N 21°00′26″E

Aleksander Zelwerowicz National Academy of Dramatic Art in Warsaw
- Akademia Teatralna im. Aleksandra Zelwerowicza w Warszawie
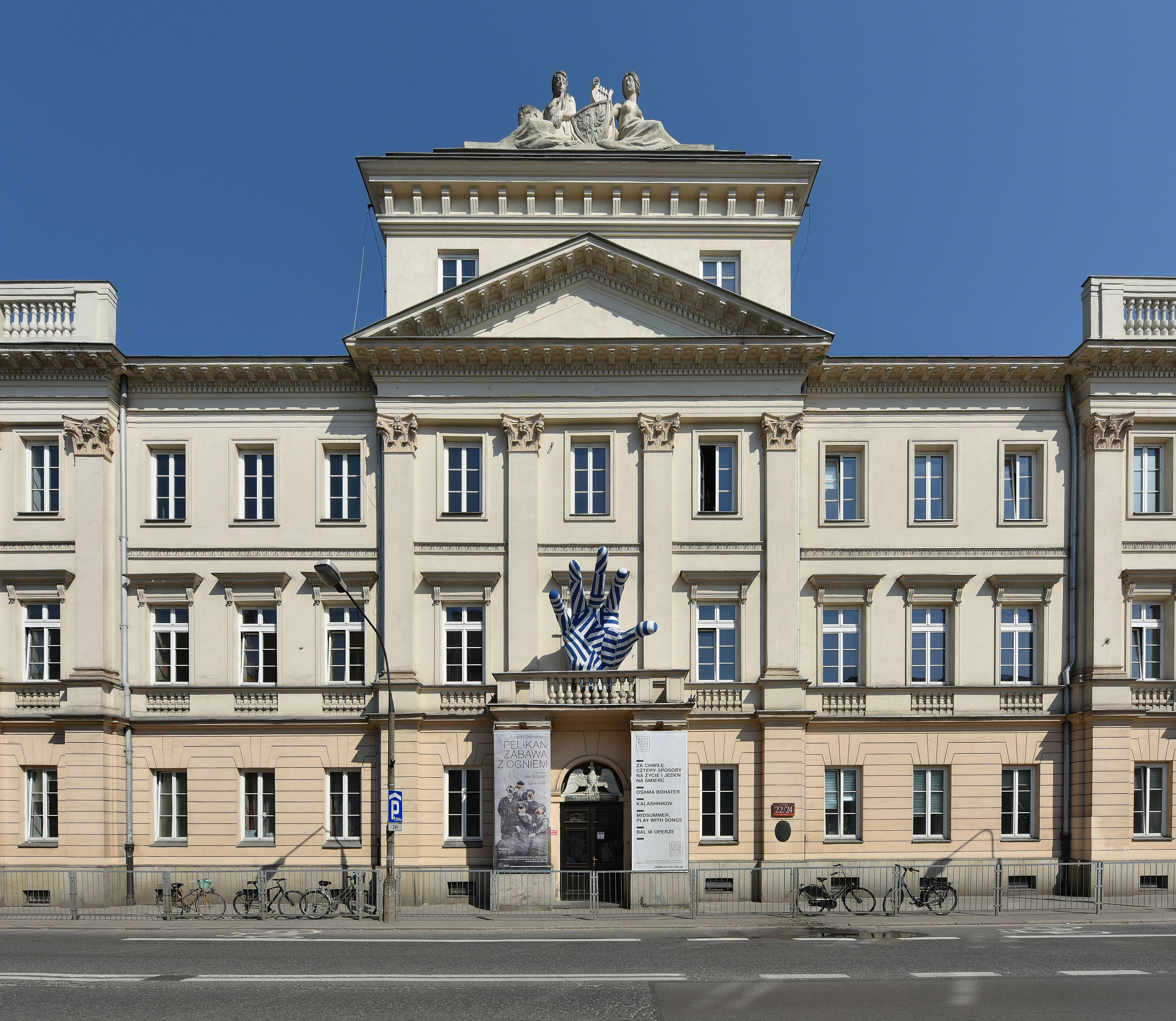
- Main building
- Type: Public university
- Established: 1946
- Rector: Wojciech Malajkat
- Location: Warsaw, Mazovian Voivodeship, Poland
- Website: akademia.at.edu.pl

The Aleksander Zelwerowicz National Academy of Dramatic Art in Warsaw (Polish: Akademia Teatralna im. Aleksandra Zelwerowicza w Warszawie) is a public higher education institution in Warsaw, Poland. Its focus is on the theatre arts. It is headquartered in the Collegium Nobilium, an eighteenth-century building which formerly housed an elite boarding secondary school run by Piarist monks.

== History ==
It was founded in Łódź in 1946 and moved to Warsaw in 1949. It continues the tradition of the National Institute of Theatre Arts (Państwowy Instytut Sztuki Teatralnej) established in Łódź in 1932. It was founded as the National Higher School of Theatre (Państwowa Wyższa Szkoła Teatralna) and received a patron (Aleksander Zelwerowicz) in 1955. In 1962 it received certification as a higher education institution. It received its current name in 1996.

Faculty members at the National Academy of Dramatic Art in Warsaw were or are predominantly working professionals in their fields, the most notable of these including: Leon Shiller, Erwin Axer, Aleksander Bardini, Stanisława Wysocka, Henryk Elzenberg, Stanisław Ossowski, Zofia Lissa, Edmund Wierciński, Jan Kreczmar, Stefan Jaracz, Maja Komorowska, Bohdan Korzeniewski, Andrzej Łapicki, Zofia Mrozowska, Janina Mieczyńska, Marian Wyrzykowski, Ludwik Sempoliński, Kazimierz Rudzki, Hanka Bielicka, Ignacy Gogolewski, Zbigniew Zapasiewicz, Jan Englert, Wiesław Komasa, Tadeusz Łomnicki, Gustaw Holoubek, Zygmunt Hűbner, Anna Seniuk.

== Rectors ==
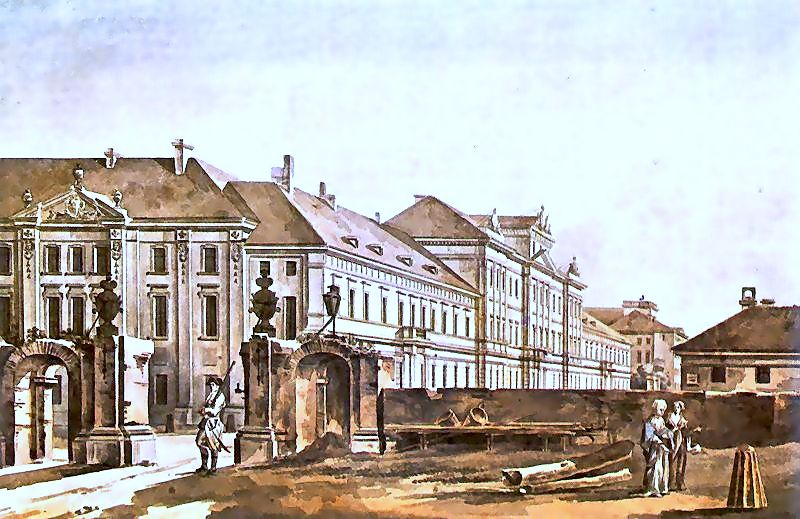
A historical painting depicting Collegium Nobilium (now the seat of the National Academy of Dramatic Art) by Zygmunt Vogel

- 1946–1949: Leon Schiller
- 1949–1967: Jan Kreczmar
- 1967–1970: Władysław Krasnowiecki
- 1970–1981: Tadeusz Łomnicki
- 1981–1987 and 1993–1996: Andrzej Łapicki
- 1987–1993 and 1996–2002: Jan Englert
- 2002–2008: Lech Śliwonik
- 2008–2016: Andrzej Strzelecki
- 2016–present: Wojciech Malajkat

== Notable alumni ==
- Vanessa Aleksander
- Piotr Adamczyk
- Michał Bajor
- Joanna Brodzik
- Agata Buzek
- Martyna Byczkowska
- Stanisława Celińska
- Andrzej Chyra
- Mateusz Damięcki
- Paweł Domagała
- Bożena Dykiel
- Jan Englert
- Adam Ferency
- Katarzyna Figura
- Piotr Fronczewski
- Krystyna Janda
- Janusz Józefowicz
- Krzysztof Kolberger
- Marek Kondrat
- Małgorzata Kożuchowska
- Emilia Krakowska
- Piotr Kraśko
- Agata Kulesza
- Olga Lipińska
- Tadeusz Łomnicki
- Daniel Olbrychski
- Bartosz Opania
- Dominika Ostałowska
- Jan Machulski
- Joanna Pacuła
- Franciszek Pieczka
- Waldemar Raźniak
- Andrzej Seweryn
- Małgorzata Socha
- Joanna Szczepkowska
- Borys Szyc
- Hubert Urbański
- Roman Wilhelmi
- Rafał Zawierucha
- Michał Żebrowski
- Artur Żmijewski
- Marta Żmuda Trzebiatowska
- Zbigniew Zapasiewicz

== See also ==
- Theatre of Poland
