= Beata Tadla =

Polish journalist (born 1975)

Beata Edyta Tadla
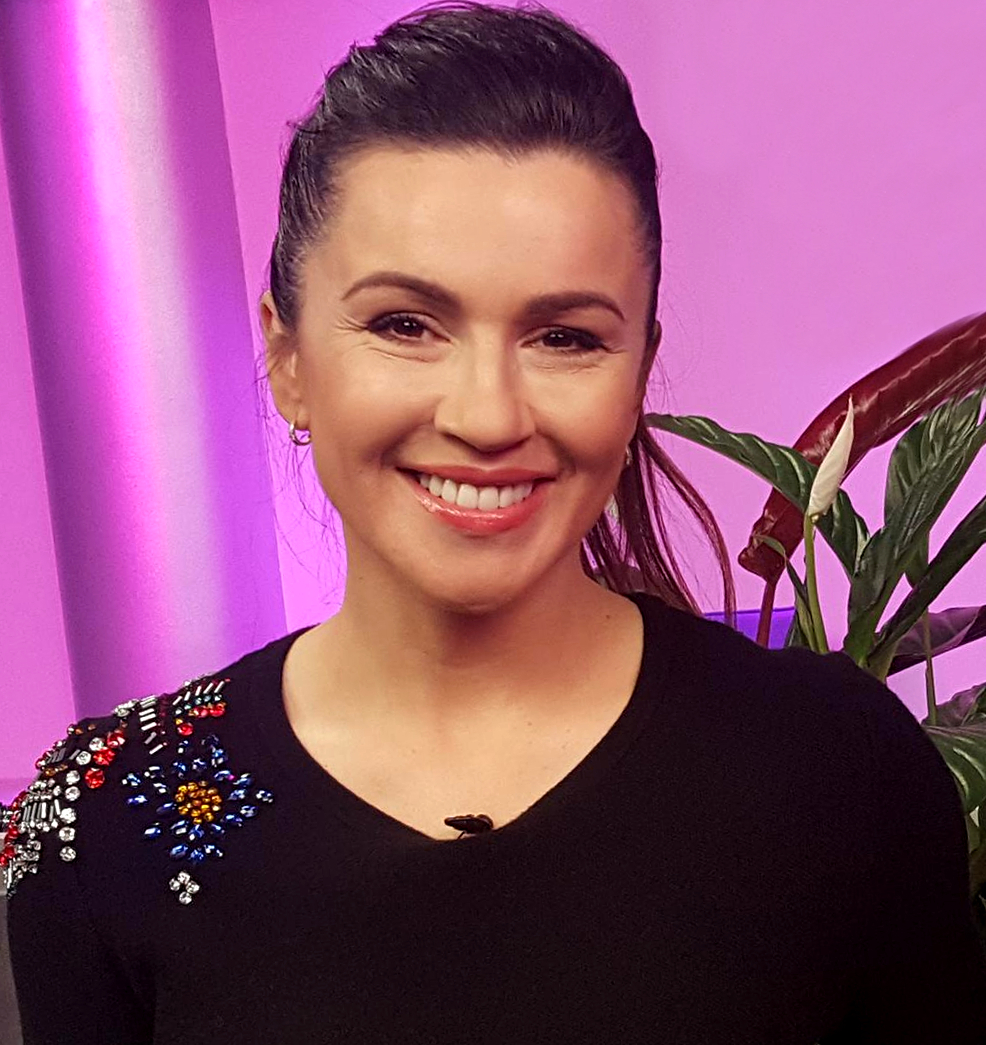
- Beata Tadla in 2018
- Born: 14 June 1975 (age 51); Legnica, Poland
- Education: Uniwersytet Poznański
- Occupations: Television presenter, journalist
- Years active: 1991–present
- Spouse: Michał Cebula (m. 2021)
- Children: 1

Beata Edyta Tadla (born 14 June 1975 in Legnica) is a Polish journalist and TV presenter.

== Biography ==
She is a graduate of I Tadeusz Kościuszko High School in Legnica. She then went to Adam Mickiewicz University in Poznań where she studied cultural studies and management of cultural institutions. Tadla went on to receive a postgraduate degree in voice and speech training at SWPS University.

== Career ==
She began working as a journalist in 1991 at Radio Legnica and then with Warsaw's Radio Eska, Super FM and Radio Plus. On 12 January 2019 she began hosting the program "This is the weekend" on Radio ZET, and since march to June 2019 the audition "StereoTYP. Since September 2019 she is a host of the program "Zet jak związki".

She has collaborated with TV Puls, TVP and TVN Style (since August 2004), where she ran the program Young Mother Club til 2006. She worked at TVN24 from 2005 to 2012. In TVN24 she ran the information services like the Magazine 24 Hours, Facts after the Facts and Facts in the Afternoon.

From 6 October 2007 to 22 April 2012, together with TV presenter Piotr Marciniak, she hosted a weekend edition of Facts in TVN. From 6 November 2007 to 3 January 2016 she ran a main daily edition of Wiadomości in TVP1. From September 2013 to January 2016 Tadla has led "This night" program for TVP Info station, that had its editions straight after the Daily News. From December 2012 to June 2013 she hosted the Monday editions of a morning program by TVP1 "Coffee or tea?". From 9 November 2016 to 30 November 2018 she co-hosted the information service Nowa TV - 24 Hours. From February till July 2019 Tabla has co-hosted program "Without the limits" for Superstacja television.

She also works with students and future journalists, as she is one of a collaborating lecturers at the Institute of Journalism and Social Communication at the University of Wrocław.

== Other activities ==
A journalist and TV presenter, Beata Tadla has collaborated several times in theater, film (as an actress or lector), as well as on the stage at various TV shows.

On 3 September 1992 she played a court lady in a play directed by Krzysztof Gradowski called Miss baśni i bajek, which has been staged at the Center of Arts - Dramatic Theater in Legnica. Further on, 31 March 2012, she played in a premiere of a play Trójka do potęgi in direction of Wojciech Malajkat, staged at Syrena Theater. The same year she sang as a guest in a song Karp 2012.

She took part in TV series: Barwy szczęścia (2014), Pakt (2016) and Wataha (2017), where she played a journalist. She played a part of a presenter in a TV play, Bezdech (2013). Furthermore, she played in documentary series Ocalony świat (2014) and was a lector for a documentary movie Moje Camino (2008).

She was a contestant during the eighth edition of Polish version of Dancing with the Stars in 2018 by TV Polsat. Her dance partner was Jan Kliment, with whom she has won in the finals.

== Private life ==
She is a daughter of Irena and Stanisław Tadla. She was married three times. Her first husband was a Polish Army sergeant, whom she married while in her early twenties. In 2001 she married a journalist of Polsat News, Radosław Kietliński, whom she divorced in January 2014. They have a son together. Between 2013 and 2018 she stayed in an informal relationship with a TV presenter Jarosław Kret. In 2021 she married businessman Michał Cebula, who works as a deputy president for employee affairs in a state-owned company Enea SA Operator.

== Awards ==
In 2009 she got a third award in a competition Mistrz Mowy Polskiej 2010 in a Vox Populi category. In 2013 she has been claimed as "the best fashionable woman in medias". In 2018 she got a prize of a Character of a year and won the award of a magazine "Party" for a debut of a year.
