= Grażyna Strachota =

Polish actress

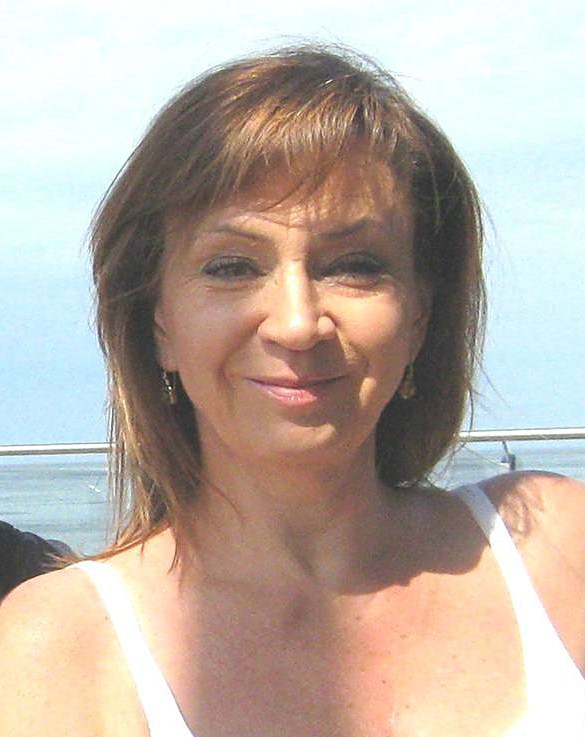
- Born: 8 September 1960; Warsaw, Poland
- Spouse: Dariusz Szpakowski
- Children: 2

Grażyna Strachota (a.k.a. Grazyna Strachota-Szpakowska; born 8 September 1960, in Warsaw), is a Polish actress. She appeared in the television series Aby do świtu... in 1992.

== Filmography ==
TV Shows
Name of Show	Character	No. Episodes
Dziewczyny ze Lwowa	Anna Paczewska	23 episodes
Przyjaciólki	Teresa	10 episodes
M jak milosc	Katarzyna Maj	18 episodes
Ojciec Mateusz	Pharmacist	1 episode
True Law	Anna Godlewska	1 episode
Na dobre i na zle	Beata	1 episode
Nowa	Rogalska	1 episode
BrzydUla	Helena Dobrzanska	1 episode
Zlotopolscy	Marita	1 episode
Zegnaj Rockefeller	Michal's Trainer	5 episodes

== Personal life ==
Strachota is married to sports commentator Dariusz Szpakowski. They have 2 children together.
