= Renata Kijowska =

Polish journalist and reporter

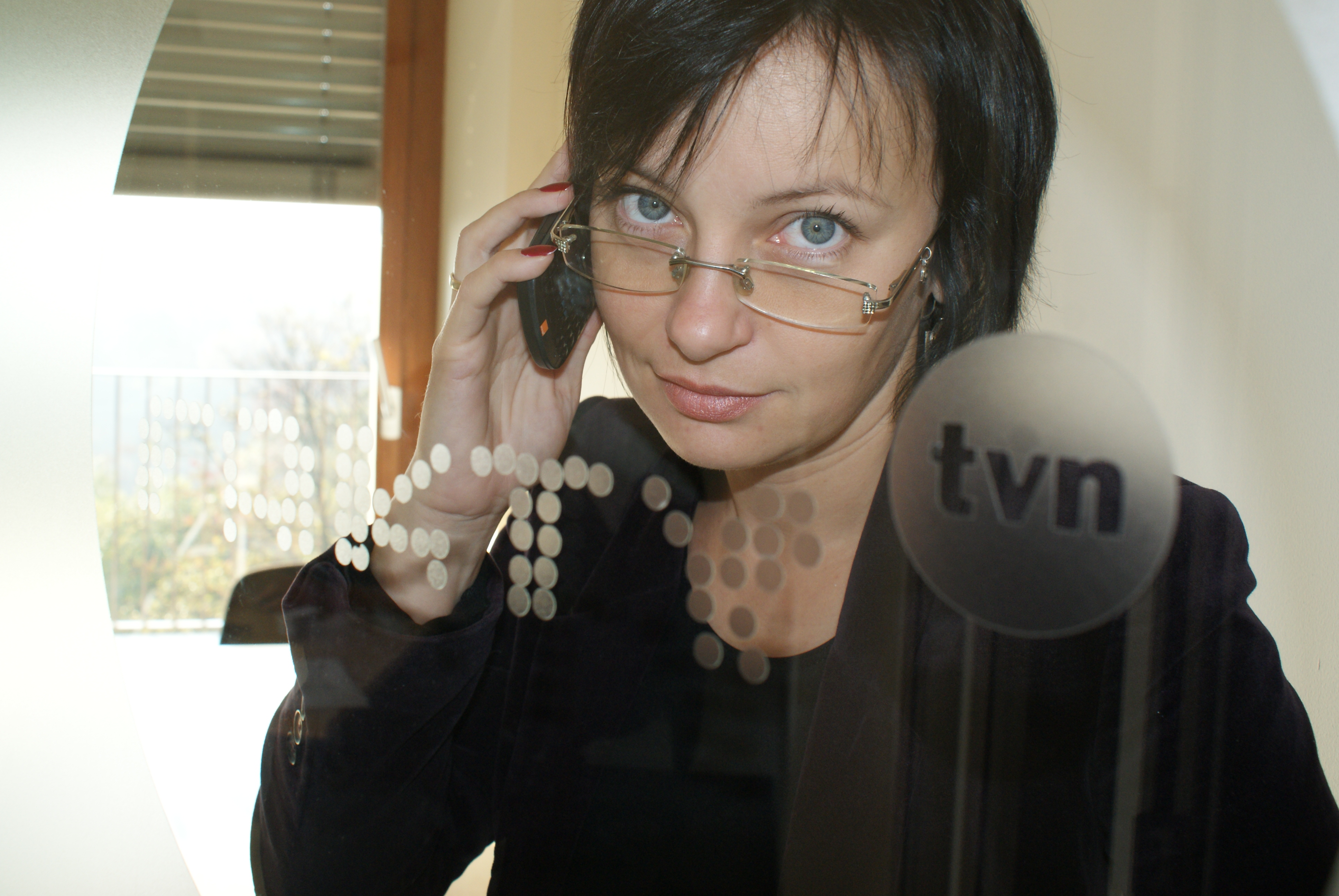
- Born: December 10, 1975 (age 50); Kraków, Poland
- Education: Jagiellonian University
- Occupation: Journalist
- Notable credit: Fakty TVN

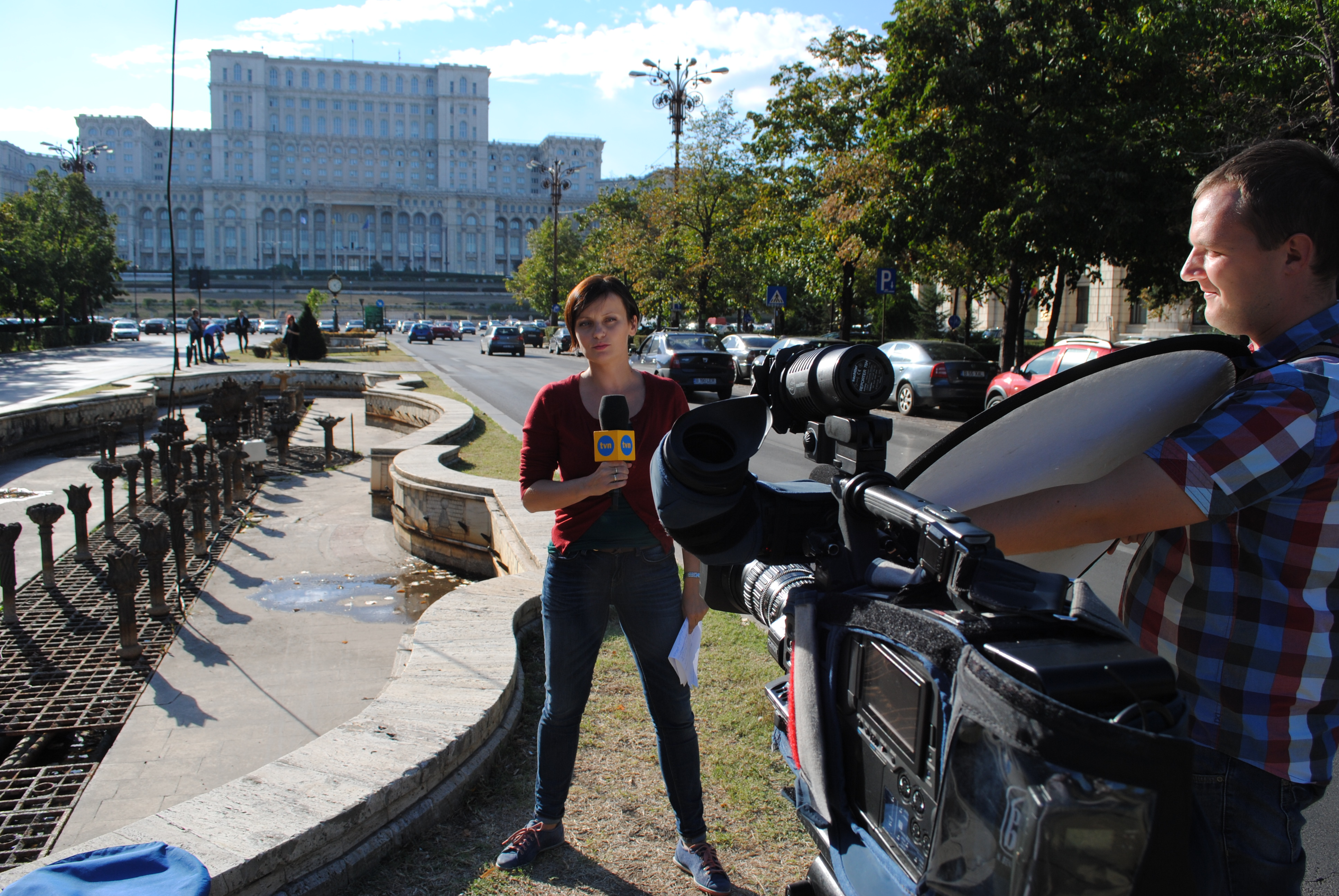
Renata Kijowska

Renata Kijowska (born December 10, 1975) is a Polish journalist and reporter of The Facts, the flagship newscast of TVN, one of Poland's major television networks.

== Biography ==
She studied political science and journalism at the Jagiellonian University in Kraków. Renata Kijowska began her career in TVP, she co-operated with television newscast Kronika (TVP Kraków). She was also a journalist of TV Puls and Radio Plus.

Renata Kijowska wrote in Tygodnik Powszechny, a Polish Roman Catholic weekly magazine, focusing on social and cultural issues.

== Publications ==
- Kuba Niedźwiedź. Historie z gawry; wyd. znak emotikon
- Hela Foka. Historie na fali; wyd. znak emotikon
