= Andrzej Zaucha =

Andrzej Zaucha may refer to:

- Andrzej Zaucha (reporter) (born 1967), Polish journalist and writer
- Andrzej Zaucha (singer) (1949–1991), Polish singer and actor
