= Justyna Pochanke =

Polish journalist and television presenter

Justyna Pochanke (born 25 January 1972 in Warsaw) is a Polish journalist and television presenter associated with TVN.

== Biography ==
She studied journalism at the University of Warsaw, where she obtained a research degree. For a year she studied at the Sorbonne at the Department of Culture and Civilization of France.

She made her TV debut as a child, leading the program 5-10-15 on TVP1.

For six years, until 2001, she worked on Radio ZET as a presenter of morning news, and ran the show Not to see. She left the station after a conflict with her authorities.

In 2001, she started working at TVN24, the emerging channel of the ITI Group. From September 2004 (after leaving the editorial office of Tomasz Lis), she ran the main issue of Fakts on TVN. Since May 2008, she is also the host of the Fakty po Fakty program on TVN24.

She wrote columns for the weekly magazine "Ozon".

== Awards ==
In 2005, she received the award of Journalist of the Year awarded by the "Press" monthly. She is a laureate of six Wiktors: for 2002 in the categories of TV personality and the greatest TV discovery 2002, for 2004 in the category of the best presenter or TV announcer, for 2005 in the category of the best presenter or TV announcer, 2007 in the category of the best TV presenter and for the year 2011 in the category of commentator or publicist.

In 2008 and 2009 she won the Telekamery Award in the news category.
