= Grzegorz Kajdanowicz =

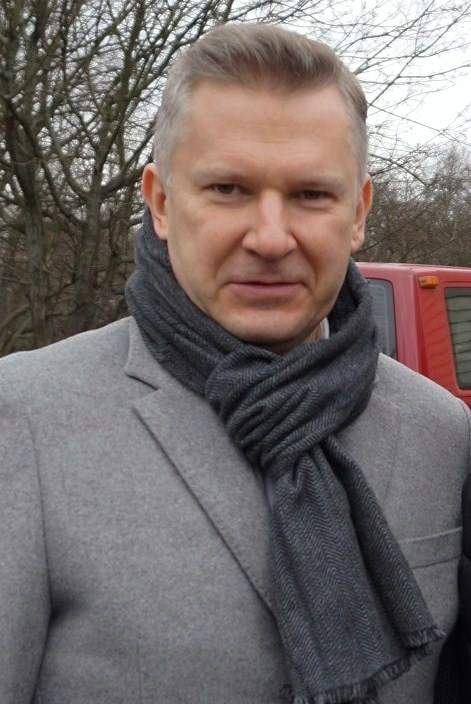
- Born: 27 July 1972 (age 52)
- Education: University of Warsaw
- Occupation: Journalist
- Notable credit(s): Fakty TVN; Fakty po Faktach

Grzegorz Kajdanowicz (born 27 July 1972) is a Polish journalist, reporter and presenter of television newscast The Facts broadcast on TVN.

== Biography ==
He studied journalism at the University of Warsaw and co-operated with television newscast Teleexpress. He has been connected with TVN since its launch in 1997. He debuted as the presenter on 4 June 2004 on The Evening Facts. He also works in TVN24 where he used to present the news and Magazine 24 Hours, currently presents The Facts After The Facts. From September 2005 he presented weekend editions of The Facts alternately with Piotr Marciniak. Since 29 September 2007 he has presented the program in duo with Anita Werner.
