= Hanna Lis =

Polish journalist

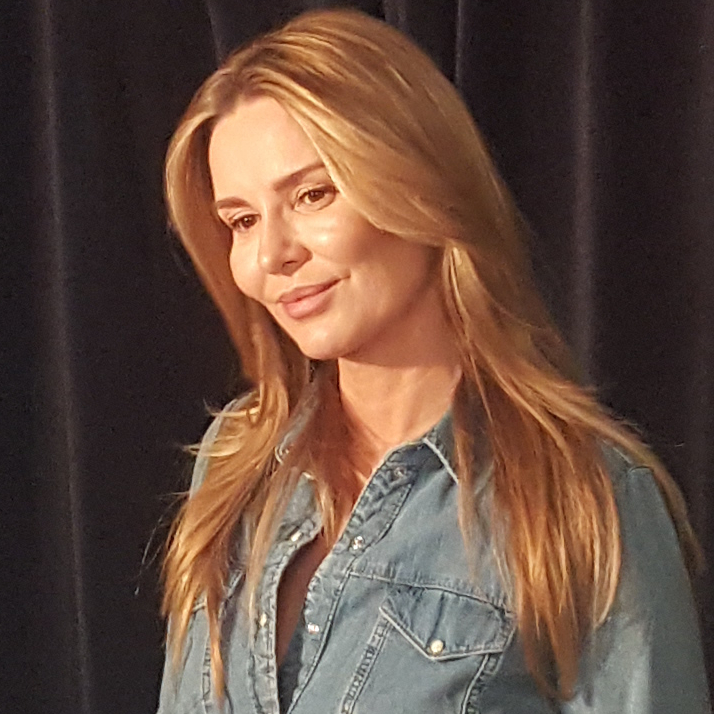
- Hanna Lis in October 2017
- Born: Hanna Kedaj; 13 May 1970 (age 55); Warsaw, Poland
- Occupations: Journalist, news anchor
- Spouse: Tomasz Lis

Hanna Lis, née Kedaj (first married name Smoktunowicz) (born 13 May 1970 in Warsaw) is a Polish TV journalist.

== Life ==
Lis was born in 1970. She started her journalistic career in 1993. For many years she was involved in political and news topics - she led and co-created leading information and journalism programs in 3 popular Polish TV channels. After finishing with Polish National Television at the beginning of 2016, she dealt with lifestyle issues: she was the host of her travel and culinary programme and ran talk-show programmes.

She appeared in the film "Rób swoje ryzyko jest twoje" (2002), was a participant in the "Asia Express" entertainment programme (2016) and she published her cookbook "Mój świat na talerzu" (2019).

She was placed on the list of "100 most valuable stars of Polish show-business" of "Forbes Polska" magazine.

In 2020, she tweeted that she had suffered from an anaphylactic shock. Her tweet resulted in speculation that it had been caused by the COVID-19 vaccines.
