= Anita Werner =

Polish television journalist

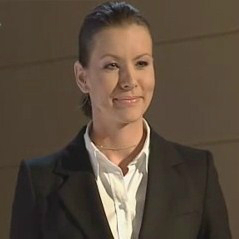
- Born: 28 March 1978 (age 48); Łódź, Poland
- Education: University of Łódź
- Occupations: Journalist, actress
- Years active: 1995–present
- Notable credit(s): The Facts; The Facts After The Facts; The Facts in the Afternoon

Anita Werner (born 28 March 1978) is a Polish television journalist, connected with TVN. She is also a former actress.

== Biography ==
She graduated I Lyceum in Łódź. Then, she studied cultural studies with speciality film theory at University of Łódź, graduating in 2001.

=== Actress ===
At the age of seventeen, she got the role in the film Słodko gorzki directed by Władysław Pasikowski. She also played in the television series Zostać Miss. However, she did not continue her acting career.

==== Filmography ====
- 1995: Dzieje Mistrza Twardowskiego
- 1996: Słodko gorzki as Paulina Wrońska
- 2000: To my
- 2001: Zostać Miss as Anita Borowska 'Żyrafa', a contestant

=== Journalism ===
Her career as a journalist began in television Wizja Sport. Then she appeared on TVN and TVN24, where she has worked since the launch of the channel in 2001. On TVN24 she presents The Facts in the Afternoon and The Facts After The Facts. In past, she also presented the news, Poranek TVN24, Straight From Poland, Magazine 24 Hours, Evening Report, Dama Pik, Studio 24, Election Night 2005 and Studio Europe.

From January to September 2004 she presented the main edition of TVN newscast The Facts. Then, until June 2007 she presented its afternoon editions alternately with Patrycja Redo. Since 29 September 2007 she presents weekend editions of The Facts in duet with Grzegorz Kajdanowicz, alternately with Beata Tadla and Piotr Marciniak.

== Awards ==
- 2003: Wiktor
- 2009: Wiktor
- 2009: MediaTOR
- 2010: InicjaTOR with Paweł Siennicki
- 2010: Telekamera
