= Andrzej Zaucha (reporter) =

Polish journalist and writer (born 1967)

Andrzej Zaucha (born 1967) is a Polish journalist and writer.

Born in Zakliczyn near Tarnów, southern Poland, Zaucha has reported as a journalist in Russia and Chechnya. Since 1997 he has been based in Moscow as a correspondent for the Polish daily "Gazeta Wyborcza", private radio station RMF FM, and television network TVN. In 2003 Zaucha published "Moscow: Nord-Ost" regarding the terrorist attack on Moscow's Dubrovka Theatre in October 2002.

He has also reported for TVN and TVN24 stations on, among other things, Russian presidential and parliamentary elections, political demonstrations in Moscow, the Polish Tu-154 crash in Smolensk and Russia's annexation of Crimea.

In March 2022, after the start of Russian aggression against Ukraine and the adoption by the Russian parliament of a law that harms the media (providing for up to 15 years in prison for “untrue” - from the Kremlin's point of view - information about the actions of the Russian military), it was withdrawn from Russian territory.
