= Ewa Drzyzga =

Polish journalist and TV presenter

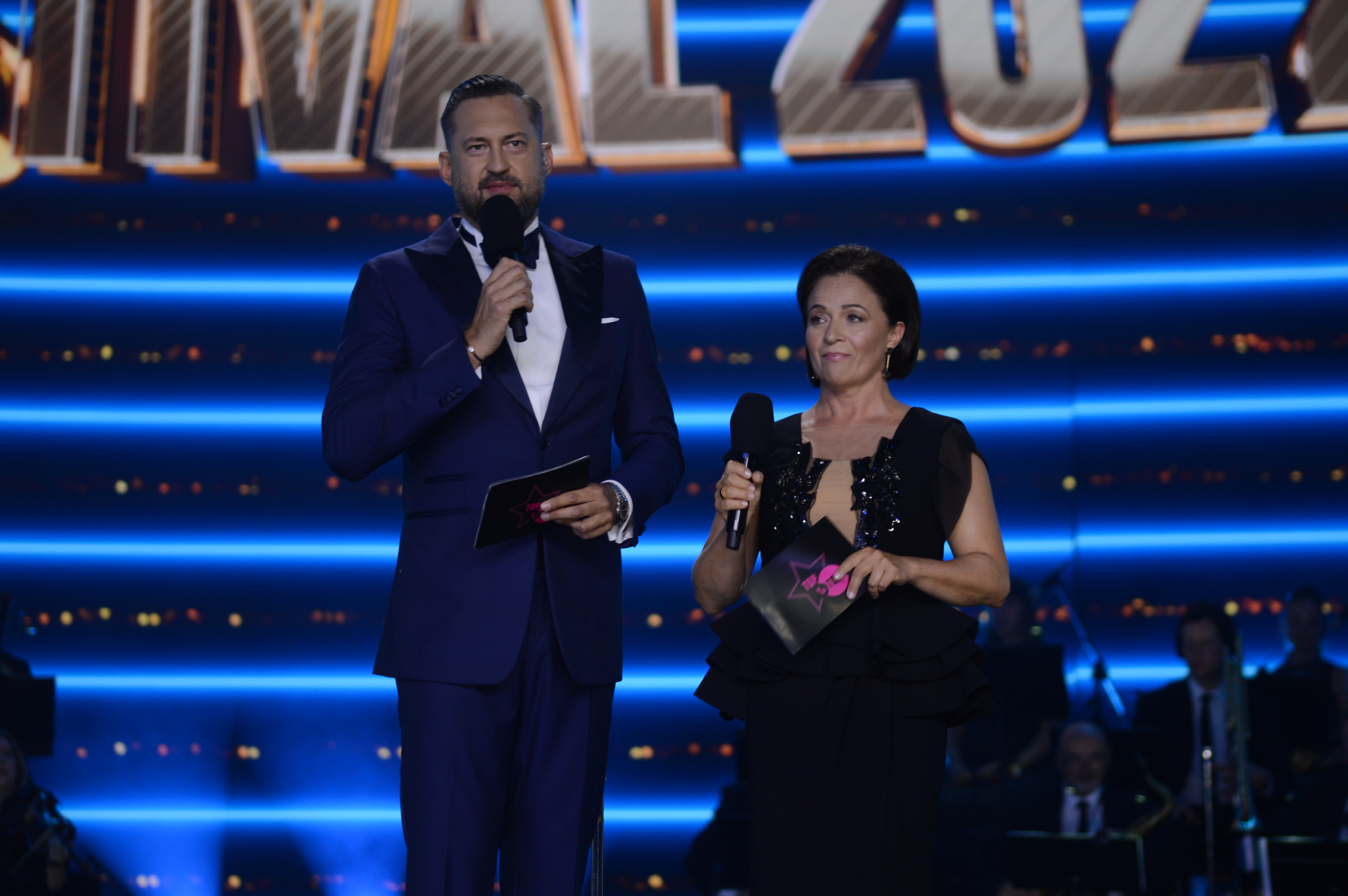
- Born: December 1967; Kraków, Poland
- Occupation(s): journalist and TV presenter
- Spouse: Marcin Borowski
- Awards: Telekamery; 2007 Telekamery – Gold Telekamera

Ewa Drzyzga (born in December 1967 in Kraków) is a Polish journalist and TV presenter. She was a host of talk-show Rozmowy w toku in 2000–2016 and since 2017 hosts medical show 36,6°C. on TVN.

She started her career in the RMF Radio. She received three Telekameras and one Gold Telekamera.

She is married to journalist Marcin Borowski and has two children with him: Stanisław and Ignacy.

== Filmography ==
- 1998 – Demons of Wars (Demony wojny wg Goi) as RMF FM journalist
- 2003 – Na Wspólnej as herself
- 2005 – Niania as herself (guest starring)
