= Szymon Majewski =

Polish journalist and television personality

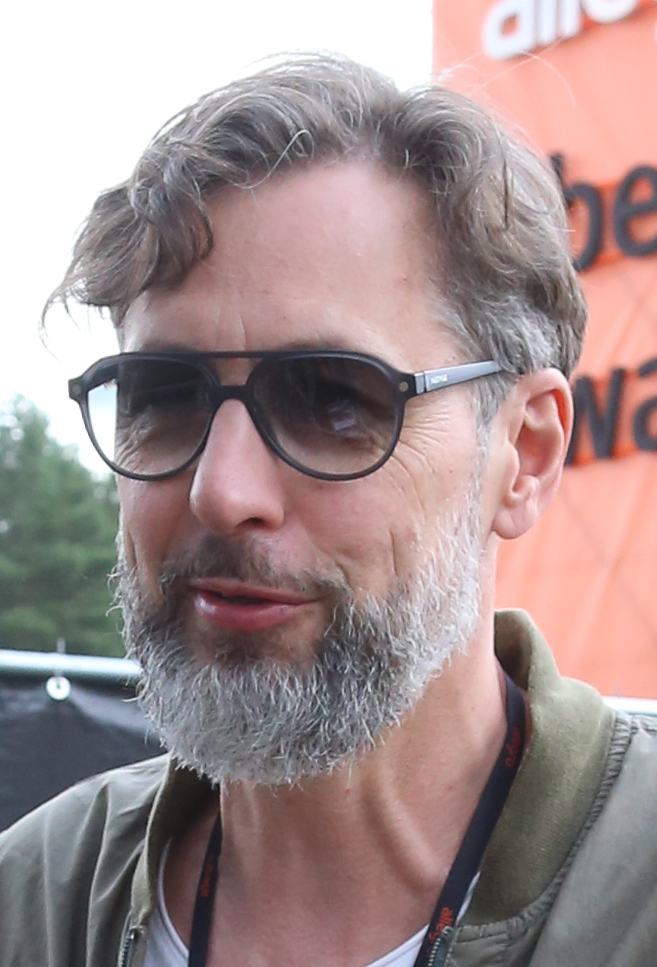
- Majewski in 2019
- Born: 1 June 1967 (age 58); Warsaw, Poland
- Occupations: showman, presenter and actor
- Spouse: Magdalena Majewska
- Awards: Wiktory; 2004 Wiktory – Television Discovery of the Year; Telekamery; 2006 Telekamery – Entertainment; Telekamery; 2007 Telekamery – Entertainment; Świry; 2006 Świry – Television personality Świry; 2007 Świry – Telenut; Phenomenon of Przekrój; 2005 Phenomenon of Przekrój

Szymon Majewski (born 1 June 1967 in Warsaw) is a Polish journalist, showman, radio and television presenter and professional television and film actor.

Majewski is a graduate of Edward Dembowski High School in Warsaw. He has a wife, Magdalena, and two children.

== Ędward Ącki ==
Ędward Ącki is a fictional character created by Majewski. Ędward Ącki has created a fictional political party ĘĄ - Szczerzy do bólu (ĘĄ - Painfully Honest), which he provides with Ądrzej Chłodek (Michał Zieliński) and Ągelika Radziwił (Aldona Jankowska).

== Filmography ==
- Kiler (Eng. "Killer") (1997) as Mioduch
- Matki, żony i kochanki II (Eng. "Mothers, wives and lovers II") (1998) as Szymon Majewski
- Kiler-ów 2-óch (Eng. "2 Killers") (1999) as Mioduch
- E=mc^{2} (2002) as Doktor Adam Kuczka
- Superprodukcja (Eng. "Superproduction") (2002) as television presenter

=== As guest ===
- Niania (eng. Nanny) (2006) episode 33 as Szymon Majewski
- Wieczór z Alicją (Eng. "Evening with Alice")

=== Host of ===
- Mamy Cię (2004, TVN)
- Grupa Szczepana (Eng. "Group of Szczepan") (90s, Radio Zet)
- Sponton (2005, Radio Zet)
- Słów cięcie gięcie (Eng. "Word's cutting and bending")
- Sympatyczny program dla miłych ludzi (Eng. "Likeable show for nice people")
- Szymon mówi show (Eng. Simon says show)
- Szymon Majewski Show (2005, TVN)
- Szymon szuka szaleńców (Eng. "Szymon looks for madmen") (TVN7)
