= Franz Strachota =

Austrian field hockey player

Personal information
- Full name: Franz Jakob Matthias Strachota
- Nationality: Austrian
- Born: 14 October 1918
- Died: 14 April 2009 (aged 90)

Sport
- Sport: Field hockey

Franz Jakob Matthias Strachota (14 October 1918 – 14 April 2009) was an Austrian field hockey player. He competed at the 1948 Summer Olympics and the 1952 Summer Olympics.
