= Edmund Wierciński =

Polish actor, stage director, and educator

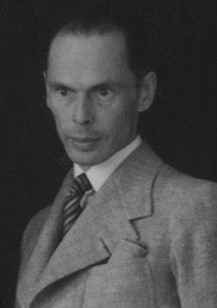
Edmund Wierciński

Edmund Wierciński (1899-1955) was a Polish stage director, actor and educator.

Married to actress Maria Wiercińska.
