= Piotr Kraśko =

Polish journalist (born 1971)

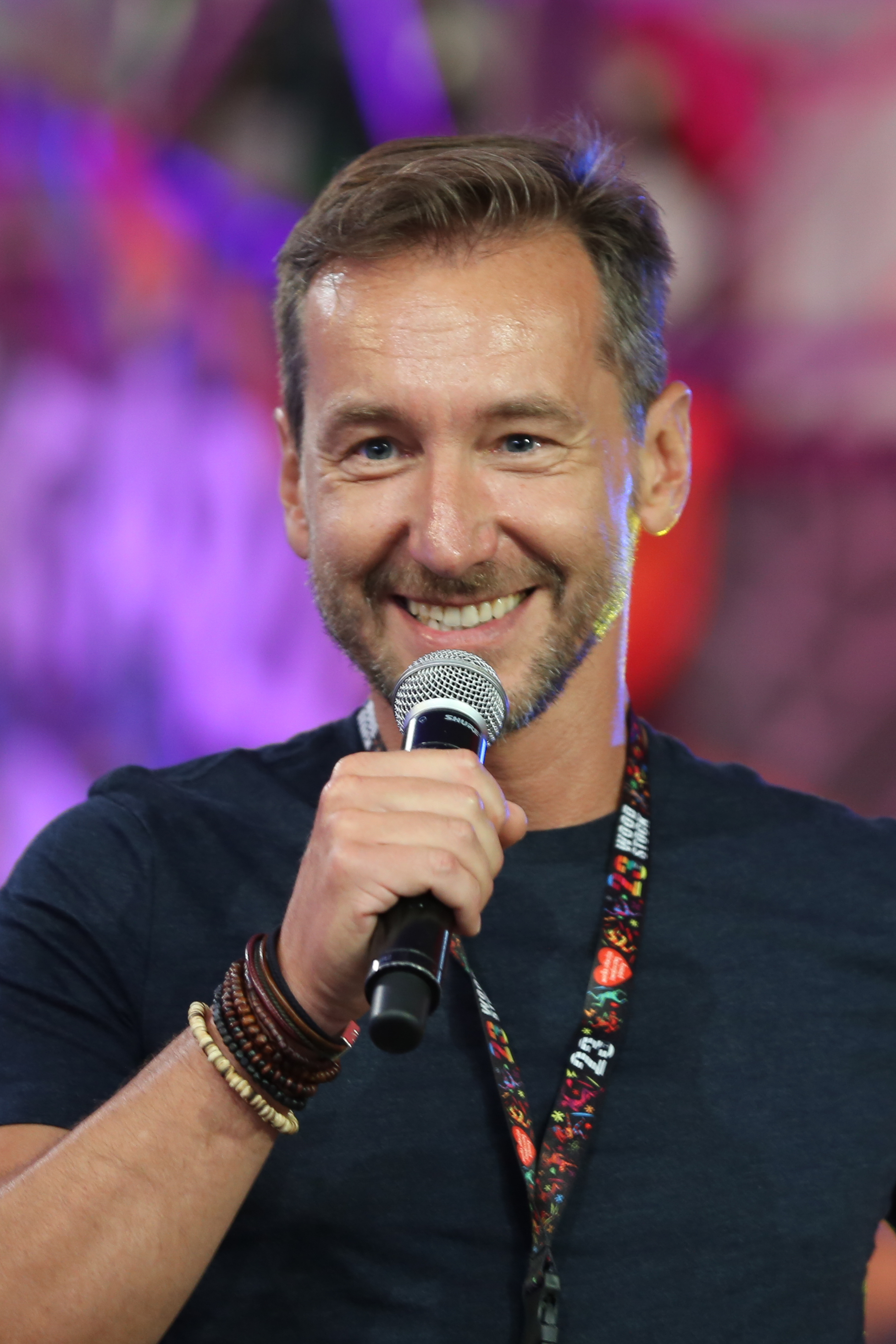
- Piotr Kraśko, Pol'and'Rock Festival, 2017
- Born: 11 July 1971 (age 54); Warsaw, Poland
- Education: National Academy of Dramatic Art in Warsaw
- Occupations: Journalist; Theatrologist; Television presenter
- Years active: 1988–present
- Notable credit(s): Wiadomości (2012–2016); Dzień Dobry TVN (2016–2020); Fakty TVN (2020–)
- Spouse: Karolina Ferenstein-Kraśko

Piotr Kraśko (born 11 July 1971, Warsaw) is a Polish journalist, theatrologist and television presenter. Between 1991 and 2016 he worked for the Telewizja Polska and since 2016 for the TVN channel.

== Life and career ==
He graduated from the Klementyna Hoffmanowa High School No. 9 in Warsaw. He subsequently graduated in theatre studies from the National Academy of Dramatic Art in Warsaw. During his studies he worked for the academic weekly Auditorium. Before the collapse of communism he was the host of a children's programme 5-10-15 broadcast on TVP1 channel. He also hosted the Na żywo as well as Oblicza mediów TV programmes. He worked as a TVP correspondent in Brussels (2003), Rome (2004–2005) and Washington (2005–2008). In the years 2011–2013, he hosted the Na pierwszym planie TV program. Between 2012 and 2016 he served as the head of the Wiadomości news programme. He frequently covered John Paul II's visits to Poland and travelled to various places around the world to provide live coverage of such events as the 2004 Indian Ocean earthquake and tsunami, 2005 London bombings, 2010 Smolensk air disaster, 2011 Tōhoku earthquake and tsunami as well as the 2014 Euromaidan.

Since 2016, he has been working for the TVN Group. Between 2016 and 2020 he hosted the Fakty o świecie program on TVN24 BiS and co-hosted the Dzień Dobry TVN morning show broadcast on TVN. In 2020, he was appointed head of the Fakty TVN, the flagship newscast of TVN channel.

He was the recipient of the Wiktor Award for Best Television Presenter in 2008 and 2013.

== Personal life ==
He is a son of film producer Barbara Pietkiewicz and journalist Tadeusz Kraśko. Between 2000 and 2004 he was married to Dominika Czwartosz. In 2008 he married Karolina Ferenstein with whom he has two sons: Konstanty (b. 2007) and Aleksander (b. 2009), and a daughter Lara (b. 2016).

Kraśko lost his driving license in 2009 and regained it the same year, he lost it again in 2014 without renewing it. In 2016 he was sentenced for fine of 100,000 PLN for driving without necessary documents., and for the second time in 2021 to pay fine of 7,500 PLN. In 2012–2016 Kraśko failed to provide tax return in time and was obliged to pay back tax with accrued interest of 760,000 PLN; with his overdue tax return he provided additional invoices for that period, which increased the payment amount to 850,000 PLN in total—all of which has been settled.

== Selected publications ==
- Dyskretny urok wystąpień publicznych, czyli Jak zmienić koszmar w radość (with Tomasz Kammel and Robert Krool), Warsaw 2002, ISBN 83-88931-22-9
- Kiedy świat się zatrzymał. 63 dni w Watykanie z Piotrem Kraśko, Katowice 2005, ISBN 83-7030-449-4
- Rok reportera, Katowice 2009, ISBN 978-83-7030-660-1
- Smoleńsk – 10 kwietnia 2010, Warsaw 2010, ISBN 978-83-62343-09-6
- Alaska – Świat według reportera, Warsaw 2011, ISBN 978-83-7596-141-6
- Świat w pigułce, czyli Teksas jest większy od Francji, Warsaw 2011, ISBN 978-83-7596-233-8
- Rwanda – W stanie wojny, Warsaw 2012, ISBN 978-83-7596-257-4
- Irak – W stanie wojny, Warsaw 2012, ISBN 978-83-7596-258-1
- Bejrut – W stanie wojny, Warsaw 2012, ISBN 978-83-7596-259-8
- Wielka Brytania – Świat według reportera, Warsaw 2012, ISBN 978-83-7596-261-1
- Francja – Świat według reportera, Warsaw 2012, ISBN 978-83-7596-264-2

== See also ==
- Media in Poland
