= Dariusz Szpakowski =

Polish sports commentator

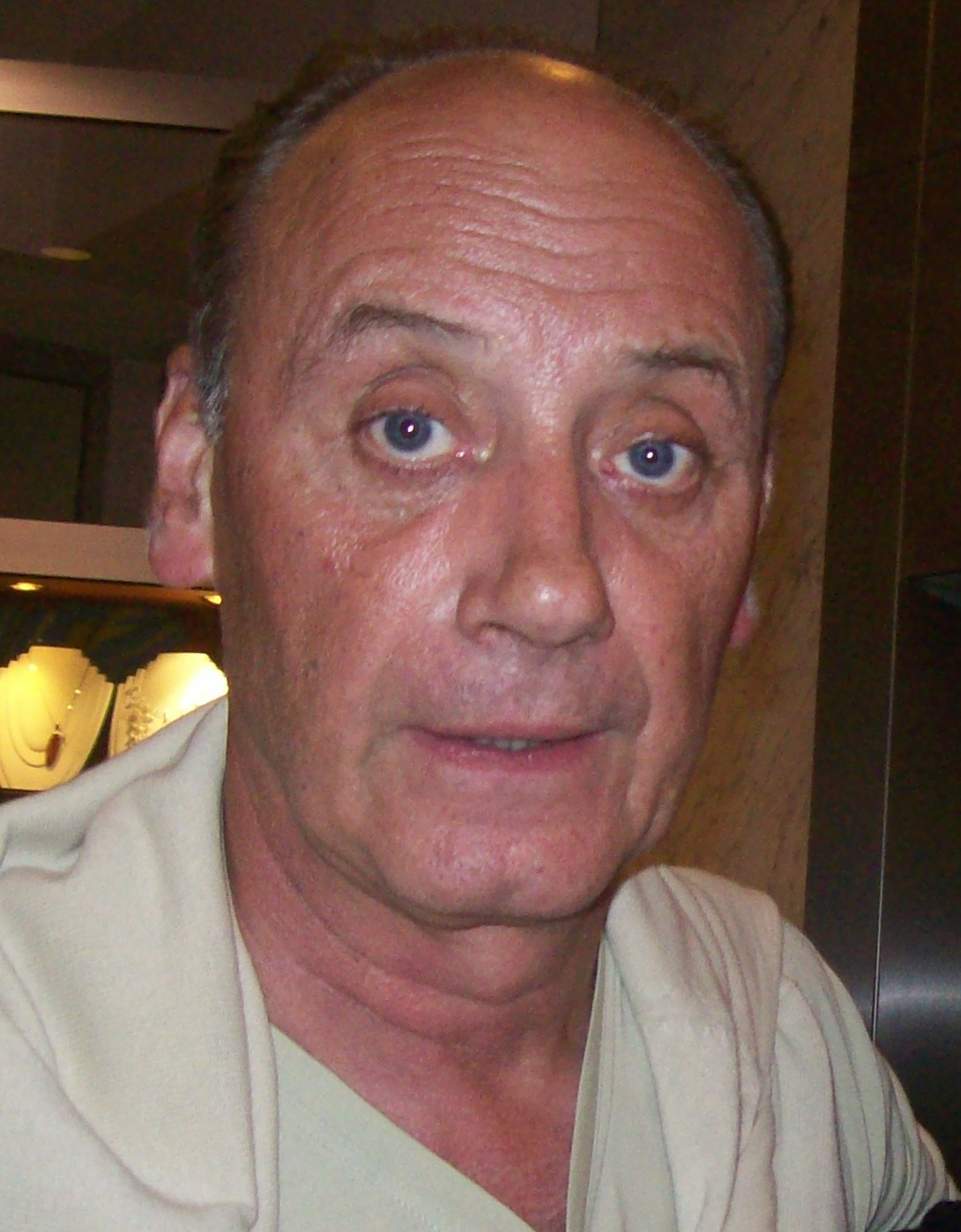
Dariusz Szpakowski

Dariusz Szpakowski (born 15 May 1951 in Warsaw) is a popular Polish Sports commentator, working for the Polish Television. He also used to work for the Polish Radio.

Szpakowski, a graduate of Warsaw's Jan Zamoyski High School and Józef Piłsudski University of Physical Education in Warsaw, began his career in sports journalism after playing basketball for Legia Warsaw during his teenage years. Specializing in football, he has provided commentary for major international events, including the Olympic Games, FIFA World Cup, UEFA European Championship, as well as matches featuring the Polish National Team and the UEFA Champions League. He is uniquely recognized as the only sports commentator globally to have attended twelve World Cups, providing commentary for matches from 1978 to 2022. On 23 May 2024, he informed that he was joining the Kanał Zero team for a permanent collaboration to host programs about the matches he had worked on.
