= RMF FM =

Polish radio station established in 1990

- Kraków; Poland
- Broadcast area: Poland, parts of Sweden, Denmark, Germany, Hungary, Belarus, Slovakia, Ukraine
- Frequencies: 91.0 FM (Warsaw); 93.3 FM (Bydgoszcz)

Programming
- Language: Polish
- Format: CHR/Hot AC, news and music

Ownership
- Owner: Bauer Verlagsgruppe

History
- First air date: 15 January 1990

Links
- Webcast: Live Stream
- Website: rmf.fm

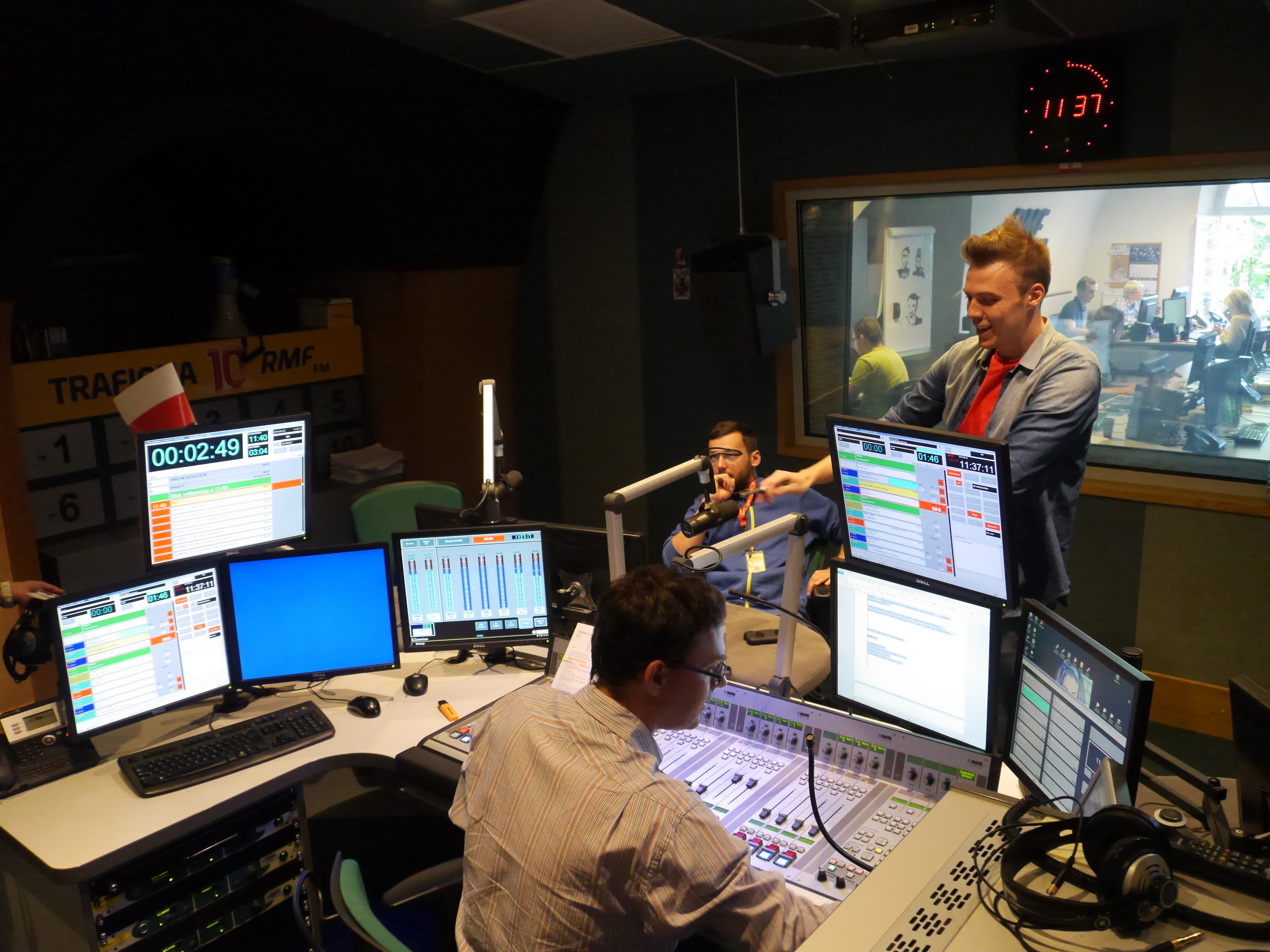
Radio RMF FM. Studio

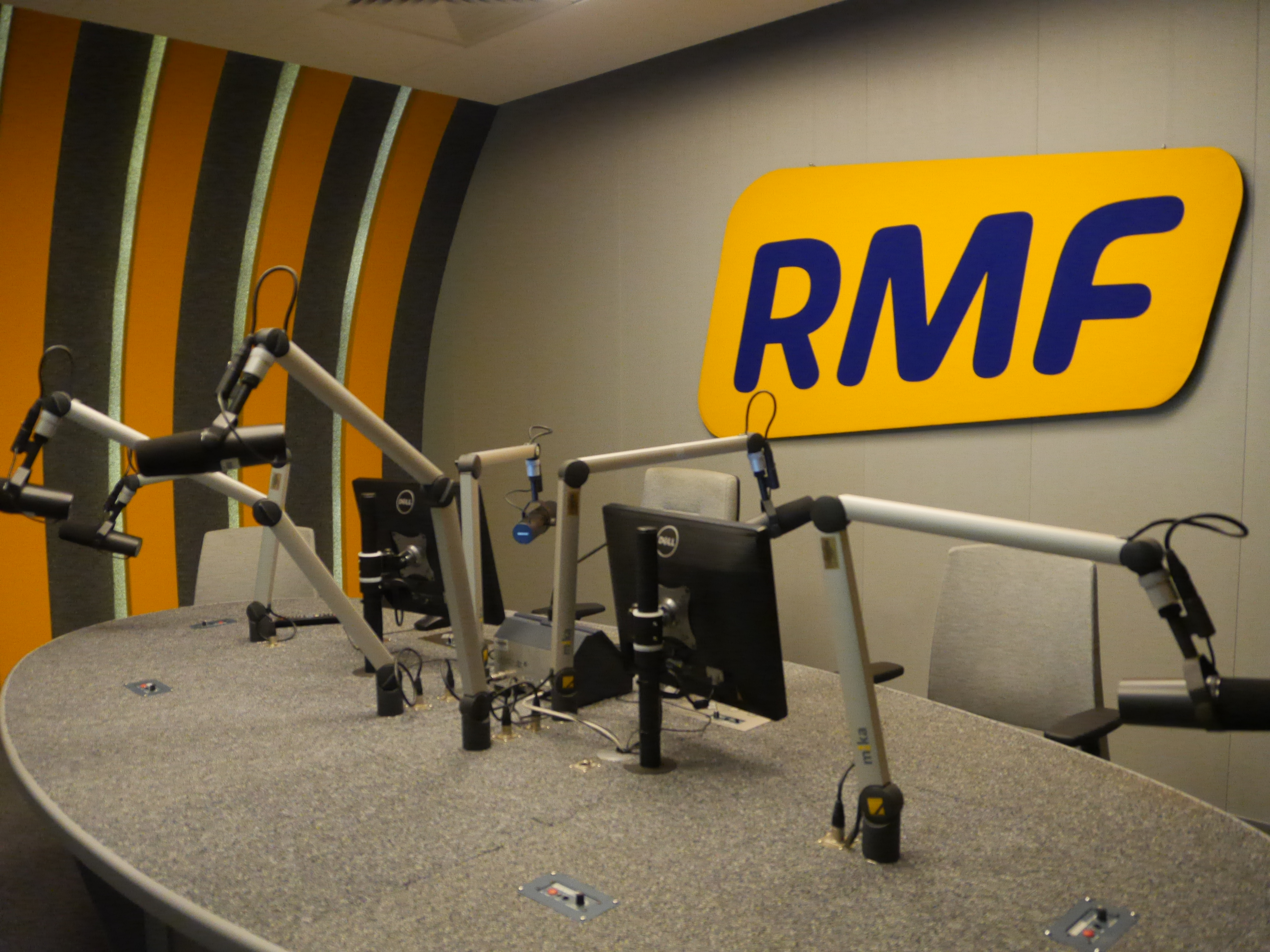
Radio RMF FM. News studio

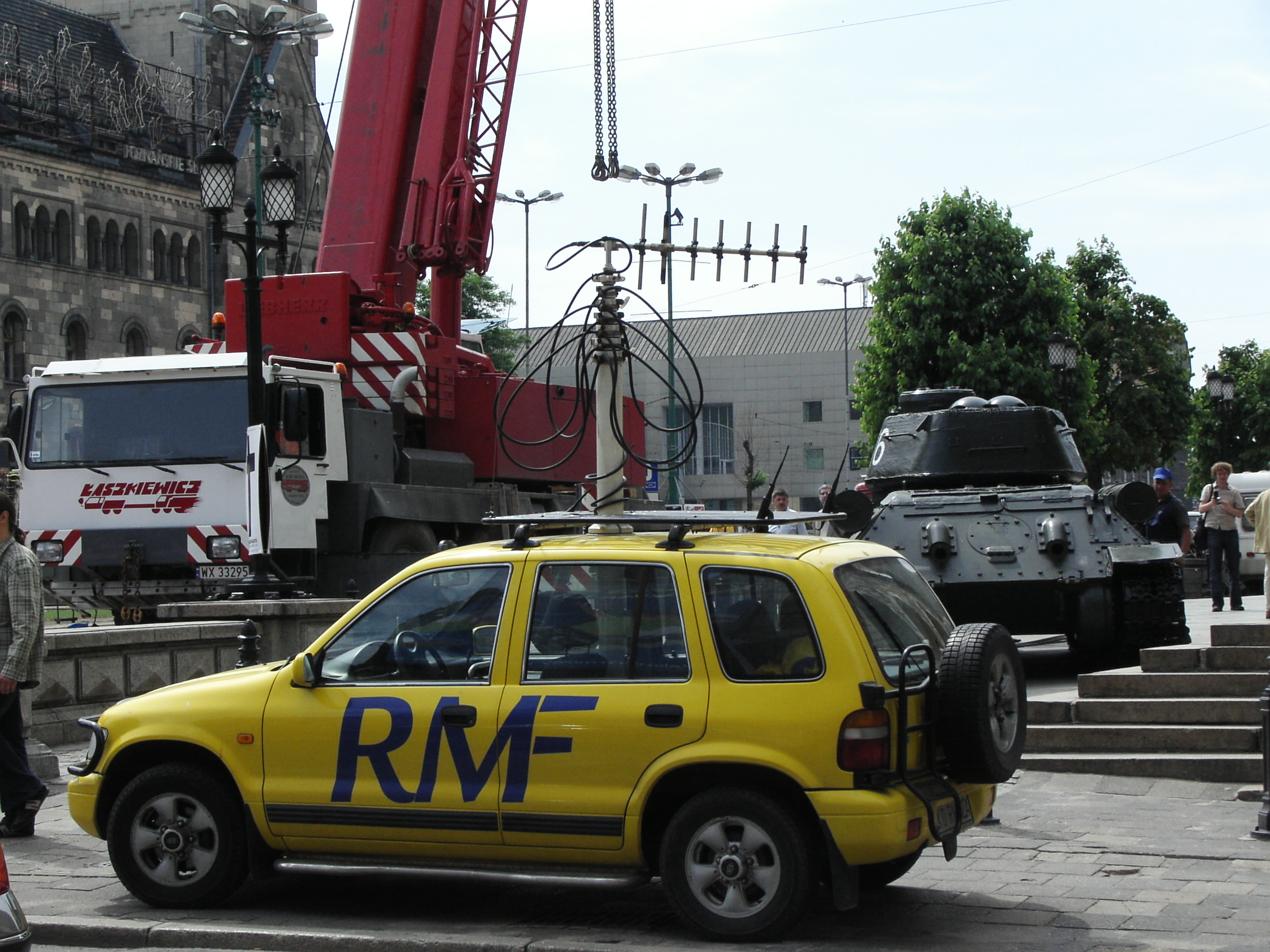
Radio RMF FM. Kia Sportage in Poznan.

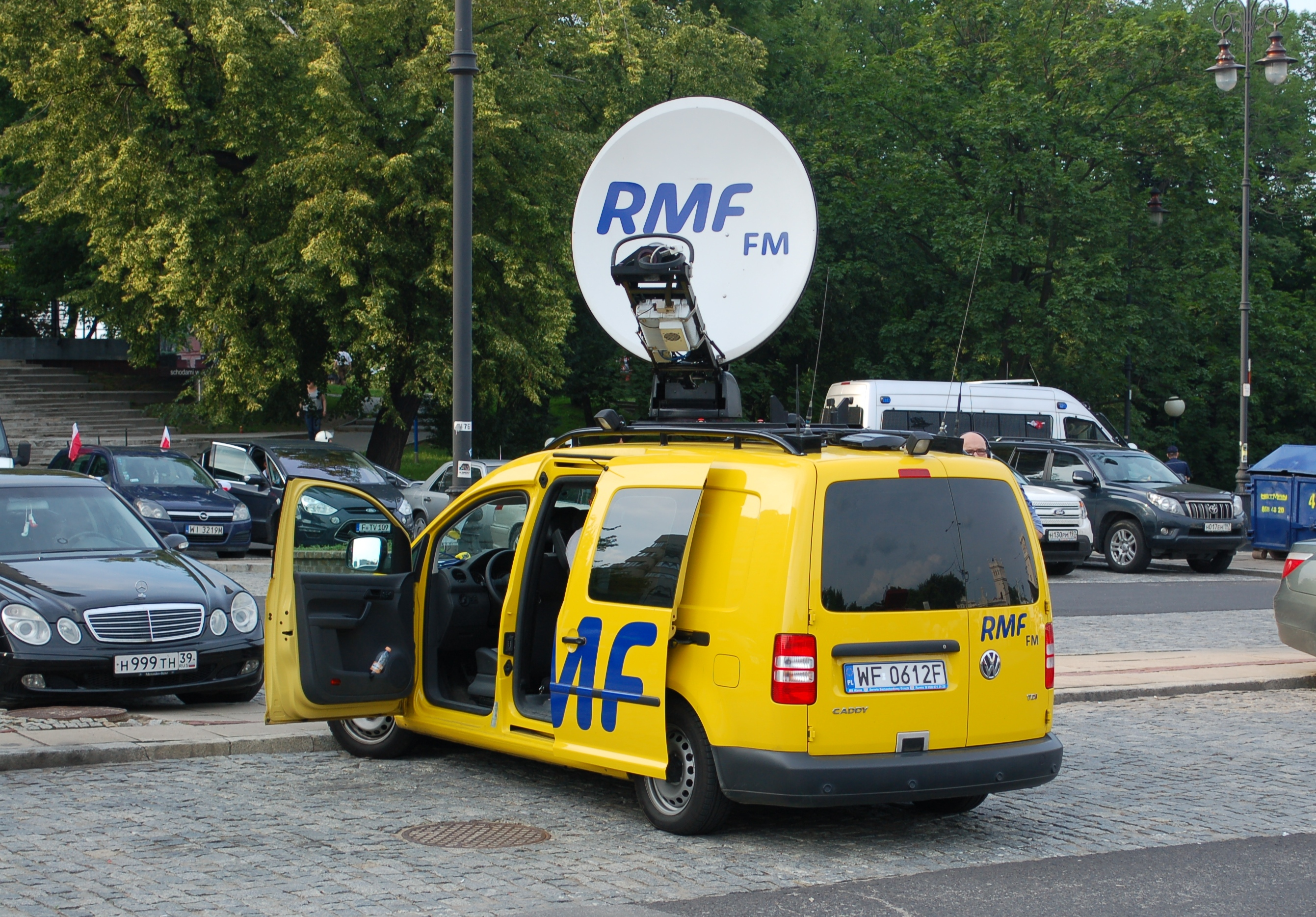
Radio RMF FM. VW Caddy as outside broadcasting van during EURO 2012

RMF FM (abbreviation to Radio Muzyka Fakty FM, translation: Radio Music Facts FM; previously: Radio Małopolska Fun FM; translation: Radio Lesser Poland Fun FM) is the first commercial radio station in Poland, currently broadcasting in AC radio format. RMF FM started broadcasting on 15 January 1990 in Kraków. The current director is Tadeusz Sołtys. The radio is wholly owned by the German Bauer Verlagsgruppe. It is the first private radio station in Poland and is available throughout the country.

== History ==
=== Origin ===
The main founder of the radio was Stanislaw Tyczynski, who initiated Radio Solidarność Małopolska (Solidarity Radio Lesser Poland) in 1981. From 1984 until 1989, he lived in France. After returning to Kraków on 9 June 1989, together with a group of Solidarity activists, he established the Krakowska Fundacja Komunikacji Społecznej (KFKS, Kraków Foundation of Social Communication), aiming to "propagate free social communication, reliable and objective information, free expression of opinions and views".

The first application for the frequency and radio license was submitted as early as November 1989; however, it was rejected. Shortly afterwards, a second application was submitted for the retransmission of Fun Radio, citing similar broadcasts by TV Ostankino and Rai Uno in Kraków. This time the application was accepted, and the station was given the frequency 70.06 MHz.

=== 1990s ===
The rebroadcast was launched on 15 January 1990. The first song to appear on the air was "Africa" by the US rock band Toto. Initially, the station was housed in two apartments, but after eight months the broadcast was moved to the Kościuszko Mound. At the same time, the first Polish commercials appeared (partly made up by the journalists to give the impression of great interest on the part of advertisers) and regular news services from Kraków, and the first truckload of equipment donated by Fun Radio arrived at the station. The programme gradually expanded - from 24 September, hourly news and programmes from 5:00 to 9:00 (from 12 November to 14:00) and from 22:00 to 1:00 at night were broadcast from Kraków. The hosts of the programmes included Ewa Drzyzga, Piotr Metz, Marcin Wrona, Tadeusz Sołtys, Andrzej Sołtysik and Bogdan Rymanowski.

Since 7 January 1991, Radio Free Europe services were broadcast on RMF and on 14 January, Paweł Pawlik became the first field correspondent, broadcasting from Tarnów. On 25 February, the first foreign correspondent appeared in Paris, In April, an outpost was opened in Vienna and in June in the Warsaw Marriott Hotel - the first employee was Hieronim Wrona. On 1 July 1991, the station's transmission truck, an off-road Toyota Land Cruiser, made its first introduction. On 11 December 1991, the car took part in the first big event - the fire of the Krakow Philharmonic Hall.

In October 1991, the cooperation between RMF and KFKS ended. This was due to the fact that the French shareholders did not accept only a 33% stake in the company, as allowed by Polish law, and were interested only in full ownership. As a result, the retransmission of Fun Radio ended.

On 20 April 1992, the station broadcast The Freddie Mercury Tribute Concert featuring Metallica, Elton John, David Bowie, U2 and Guns N' Roses live. On 26 June 1992, the second studio was opened and in July 1992, the correspondent's office in Warsaw. Also on 15 July, FM was added to RMF for the first time. On 12 September, the first music charts appeared, on 2 November, the station appeared on the satellite (thanks to the agreement with the Viacom-owned MTV Europe it occupied the second audio subcarrier of this station) and in December, a second RMF FM transmitter was launched - in Katowice (on 71.75 MHz).

On 16 January 1993, a RMF FM branch in Katowice was launched (the first local branch outside Kraków). On 20 January, appeared a correspondent in Washington DC, USA. On 8 March, started production of its own programme in Częstochowa. On 1 September, the first breakfast programme, titled "Ni w 5 ni w 9" was launched, which on 30 August 1999, changed into "Wstawaj, szkoda dnia" broadcast until later years.

In February 1994, the National Broadcasting Council (KRRiT) decided to grant the station a nationwide license. On April 15, an outlet in Brussels was launched. On 26 May, the concession included the possibility of local splits. On 1 November, a local programme was launched in Łódź and on 19 December a local station was launched in Warsaw - the broadcast was "turned on" by the then director of the National Broadcasting Council using a laptop online.

In the year of 1995, local affiliates were launched in Wrocław (2 January), Poznań (6 February), Lublin (5 April), Opole, Zakopane (17-22 July respectively), Rzeszów (1 August), Trójmiasto (9 September), Szczecin (2 October) and Bydgoszcz (27 November; in September 2008, the affiliate was moved to Toruń) as well as correspondent offices in Tokyo (13 March) and Tel Aviv (1 May). In June 1995, the station became the owner of the first satellite radio news truck in Poland, which it used for the first tour of the "Inwazja mocy" series, which lasted throughout the summer. During the Inwazja concert in Tychy on 15 August 1995, a helicopter rented by the station crashed and the pilot was killed.

From 5 February 1996, the station had a correspondent in London, and from 1 March also in Moscow. At the same time, "Polityczne grafitii" appeared, broadcast simultaneously on RMF FM and Polsat. At the end of the year, the station became the most popular radio station in Poland according to listenership polls - with breaks, it still holds this position.

On 1 February 1997, the station was launched in Olsztyn. On 16 June, Hop Bęc chart was launched, which in its heyday (around 1999) was the most popular youth programme in the country. Conducted from 26 June 1997, another edition of the "Inwazja Mocy" campaign was suspended for about a month because of the flood of the millennium - the station created "Inwazja Pomocy", supporting the rescue efforts of the services and reporting on them on air.

In January 1998, RMF FM journalists were the only Poles broadcasting from Baghdad, Kuwait and Bahrain during the crisis in the Persian Gulf. On 1 September, the local station Opera FM (today as "RMF Classic") was launched in Kraków.

In March 1999, RMF FM journalists reported on the war in the Balkans. In July, the station conducted another edition of "Inwazja mocy", during which the largest gathering of people in Poland took place - about 3 million people. On 1 September 1999, the station took over the local radio station in Kraków - Blue FM (today as Radio Eska Kraków).

=== 2000s ===
On 11 February 2000 Interia.pl, a subsidiary of RMF, was launched. On 1 March, a correspondent in Berlin appeared and on 7 December, the station, as the first of all national radio stations, appeared on the Wizja TV platform.

On 7 March 2001, the National Broadcasting Council renewed the station's license for another 10 years, but this time without the possibility of local splits. Due to this decision, on 17 April, a picket of journalists and companions of the station was held in front of the Council's headquarters. However, the Council did not change its decision - on 22 May 2001, the new concession came into force, and on 25 May 2001 the broadcast of local programmes was terminated. At the turn of July–August 2001, the station conducted a relief campaign for the flood victims in the Sucha Beskidzka area. On 11 September 2001, a few minutes before 3 p.m., information about the attack on the WTC was broadcast, followed by the longest news service in the history of Polish radio (the record was broken after the Smolensk disaster, also by RMF). Immediately after the attacks, reporters appeared in Pakistan, Afghanistan, the Persian Gulf, Israel and Bethlehem, reporting on the tensions following the attack.

On 28 March 2002, the station's signal was made available online. On 15 July 2002, RMF was the only radio station in Poland to interview President George Bush. In August, the station broadcast the final pilgrimage of John Paul II to Poland. On 24 October 2002, the station won a lawsuit with the National Broadcasting Council for extending its license without the possibility of local broadcasts.

In 2003, RMF journalists were the only ones from Poland to report on the war in Iraq directly from Baghdad. On 11 April 2003, the RMF photo agency was founded and on 27 October 2003, the RMF Classic station was launched.

On 1 July 2004, RadioMan was launched, a Ukrainian radio project carried out in cooperation with RMF. On 14 July, Broker FM, the owner of RMF, made its stock market debut. On 27 September, RMF Maxxx was launched.

On 2 April 2005 at 21:55, the station announced the death of John Paul II. It then presented a multi-hour, all-night live programme. The funeral of John Paul II was also broadcast on the station along with live entries of journalists from different parts of the country. The station also extensively covered the attacks in Madrid and London as well as the MTK hall disaster and the Halemba mine disaster.

On 28 October 2006, it was announced that the station had been sold to the German publishing house Verlagsgruppe Bauer. On 30 April 2007, Miasto Muzyki (today operating as RMFon.pl) was established. In 2009, Wielka kumulacja was put on the air.

=== 2010s ===
Stanisław Smółka, one of the founders of the station, died on 7 February 2010. On 10 April 2010, the station reported extensively on the Smolensk catastrophe, broadcasting two editions of Facts which lasted 21.5 hours. During the funeral of Lech and Maria Kaczynski, another many hour-long newscast was aired. After the ceremony, the station prepared a book of thanks for the President of Georgia, who despite the volcanic eruption arrived in Krakow with various stops, and a set of golf balls for US president Barack Obama, because of the volcanic cloud did not make it to Poland and played golf during the funeral. There was also extensive coverage of the 2010 flood, during which the station collected over 30 tons of donations for flood victims.

In 2012, the station devoted much time to the EURO 2012. Two years later, it covered the canonisation of John Paul II, and also created the campaign "RMF i przyjaciele", inviting its listeners to a dinner created from dishes present in the cards of restaurants where politicians were recorded during the so-called tape scandal.

The station celebrated its 25-year anniversary in 2015 and its 30-year anniversary in 2020.

== Listenership ==
According to the Radio Track survey (performed by Millward Brown SMG/KRC), RMF FM's share in terms of listening between January and March 2017 in the 15-75 age group was 24.8 percent, which gave the station the position of radio market leader in Poland.

== Advertising campaigns ==
RMF FM organises advertising campaigns such as "Najlepsza Muzyka" ("Best Music"), "Jak zawsze RMF FM" ("As always RMF FM") or "Oddałem głos na muzykę" ("I voted for music"). All campaigns feature Polish and foreign music stars.

== Management of RMF FM and its journalists ==
- Tadeusz Sołtys - Chairman and Programme Director
- Iwona Bołdak - Deputy Programme Director
- Przemysław Kula - Deputy Programme Director
- Adam Czerwiński - Music Director
- Marek Balawajder - Information Director
- Blanka Baranowska - Deputy Information Director
- Bartłomiej Eider - Editorial Director of RMF Warsaw

== Sister stations ==
=== RMF Classic ===
RMF Classic is a subject of RMF FM which mostly plays classical music. It originally started off as OPERA FM, which broadcast music produced by an opera. In 2003, the format, as well as the name, was changed, creating the project that is known as RMF Classic.

=== RMF MAXX ===
RMF MAXX is a contemporary hit radio which started broadcasting on 27 September 2004.

=== RMF24 ===
RMF24 is a news radio in which the topics of Polish politics and world events are reported.

=== RMF ON ===
RMF ON is the online service for RMF FM.

== Broadcasts and their hosts ==
=== Currently ===
- Fakty RMF FM
- Wstawaj, szkoda dnia – Przemysław Skowron, Mariusz Kałamaga, Tomasz Olbratowski
- Byle do piątku – Daniel Dyk, Krzysztof Urbaniak
- Felieton – Tomasz Olbratowski
- Lepsza połowa dnia – Mateusz Opyrchał, Jacek Tomkowicz
- Poplista/Poplista Plus – Dariusz Maciborek
- Dobra nocka – no hosts
- Poranek RMF FM – Natalia Kawałek, Jacek Tomkowicz
- Kawałek weekendu – Krzysztof Urbaniak, Paweł Jawor
- Disco RMF – Marcin Jędrych
- Lepiej być nie może – Aleksandra Filipek, Krzysztof Urbaniak
- Numer za numerem – Mariusz Opyrchał
- Sceny zbrodni – Daniel Dyk, Kamil Barnowski
- Historia dla dorosłych – Przemysław Skowron, Jacek Tomkowicz, Tomasz Olbratowski
- Twoje 5 minut
- RMF FM do samochodu

=== Some broadcasts in the past ===
- Buntownik z wyboru – Marek Piekarczyk, Aleksandra Filipek Krzysztof Urbaniak
- Byle do piątku – Robert Konatowicz, Małgorzata Kościelniak, Krzysztof Urbaniak, Kamil Baleja, Sławomir Kowalewski, Robert Karpowicz, Ewelina Pacyna
- Czas się śmieje – Michał Figurski
- Co ludzie powiedzą – Aleksandra Filipek
- Dobry wieczór – Marcin Jędrych, Krzysztof Urbaniak, Daniel Dyk, Sławomir Kowalewski, Tomasz Brhel, Kamil Baleja
- Dobrze zagrane – Marcin Jędrych, Tomasz Brhel, Aleksandra Filipek
- Eurochart 100 – Marcin Jędrych
- Gorące numery gwiazd – Marcin Jędrych
- Gwiazdozbiór Smoka – Marcin Jędrych
- Imprezowy piątek – Marcin Jędrych, Jacek Tomkowicz, Joanna Meus
- Imprezowy weekend – Marcin Jędrych, Mateusz Opyrchał
- JW 23 – Marcin Jędrych, Marcin Wrona, Witold Odrobina
- Kawałek weekendu – Marcin Jędrych
- Krakowskie Przedmieście 27 – Tomasz Skory i Konrad Piasecki, Piotr Salak i Ryszard Cebula
- Koniec wieku – Piotr Metz
- Kontrwywiad RMF FM – Kamil Durczok, Konrad Piasecki
- Lepsza połowa dnia – Katarzyna Wilk i Kamil Baleja
- Lista Hop-Bęc – Marcin Jędrych
- Metzoforte – Piotr Metz, Marcin Jędrych i Tomasz Słoń
- Na językach – Marzena Rogalska
- Ni w 5 ni w 9 – Tadeusz Sołtys i Michał Kubik
- Przesłuchanie – Tomasz Skory, Agnieszka Burzyńska, Mariusz Piekarski
- Przepis na weekend – Kamil Baleja
- Przebój za przebojem – Marcin Jędrych, Joanna Meus
- Polityczne graffiti – Tomasz Skory, Brian Scott, Ryszard Cebula, Konrad Piasecki i Paweł Pawlik
- Poplista plus impreza – Dariusz Maciborek, Marcin Jędrych
- Popołudniowa Rozmowa Dnia – Tomasz Skory, Mariusz Piekarski, Roman Osica
- Poliż temat – Ewa Błachnio, Robert Korólczyk, Mariusz Kałamaga
- Poza zasięgiem – Stanisław Smółka
- Radio Muzyka Fakty – Tadeusz Sołtys, Jacek Stawiski, Ewa Drzyzga, Ewa Stykowska, Edward Miszczak, Marcin Wrona, Bogdan Rymanowski i Grażyna Bekier
- Radioturniej – Michał Figurski
- RMF Extra – Marta Grzywacz i Piotr Jaworski
- Rockandrollowa historia świata – Marcin Jędrych, Marek Piekarczyk
- Rozmowy w biegu – Maciej Dowbor
- Rozmowy podsłuchiwane – Jacek Żakowski i Piotr Najsztub
- Szkółka niedzielna – Brian Scott i Paweł Pawlik
- Świat filmu według Andrzeja Sołtysika – Andrzej Sołtysik
- Świat na głowie – Marcin Jędrych, Tomasz Olbratowski
- Tego jeszcze nie grali – Paweł Jawor, Mateusz Opyrchał
- Ten Top – Marcin Jędrych
- To lubię! – Ewa Farna
- Tydzień z głowy – Ewelina Pacyna
- Wasza muzyka – Ewa Drzyzga, Dariusz Maciborek, Piotr Metz, Robert Konatowicz, Mirosław Golański, Robert Janowski, Tomasz Brhel
- Wolno wstać – Jan Burda, Sławomir Kowalewski
- Wolne żarty – Krzysztof Urbaniak, Karol Modzelwski
- Wszystkie struny świata – Robert Konatowicz
- Wszystkie numery Agnieszki Chylińskiej – Agnieszka Chylińska
- Wszystko w temacie – Marcin Jędrych, Krzysztof Urbaniak
- Wstawaj szkoda dnia – Tadeusz Sołtys, Michał Kubik, Beata Fiedorow, Piotr Urbaniak, Witold Lazar, Sylwia Paszkowska, Marcin Ziobro, Robert Karpowicz, Kamil Baleja
- Z góry na dół – Edward Miszczak
- Za dużo, za mało – Andrzej Sołtysik, Stanisław Smólka, Andrzej Roszak, Marcin Wrona, Ewa Drzyzga

== Frequencies ==
City	Frequency	City	Frequency
Białogard	96.4	Łobez	91.3
Białystok	100.2	Łódź	93.5
Bielsko-Biała	89.2	Olsztyn	95.3
Bieszczady	101.1	Opole	95.3
Bydgoszcz	93.3	Ostrołęka	91.5
Częstochowa	105.9	Piła	96.6
Elbląg	92.6	Płock	94.3
Ełk	106.5	Poznań	94.6
Gdańsk	98.4	Przemyśl	103.4
Giżycko	102.0	Radom	88.2
Gorzów Wielkopolski	96.1	Rzeszów	100.1
Iława	107.4	Siedlce	91.9
Jelenia Góra	100.8	Słupsk	100.9
Kalisz	98.0	Suwałki	95.1
Katowice	93.0	Szczawnica	103.2
Kielce	88.2	Szczecin	106.7
Kisielice	107.4	Świnoujście	101.2
Kluczbork	99.5	Tarnów	95.4
Kłodzko	101.6	Wałbrzych	102.9
Konin	98.9	Warsaw	90.6 / 91.0
Koszalin	89.3 / 104.9	Włocławek	94.3
Kraków	96.0	Włoszczowa	97.1
Legnica	96.1	Wrocław	92.9
Leżajsk	101.8	Zamość	107.7
Lębork	103.4	Zgorzelec	93.8
Lubań	93.8	Zielona Góra	106.4
Lublin	89.3	Żagań	94.8
