= Tomasz Lis =

Polish journalist

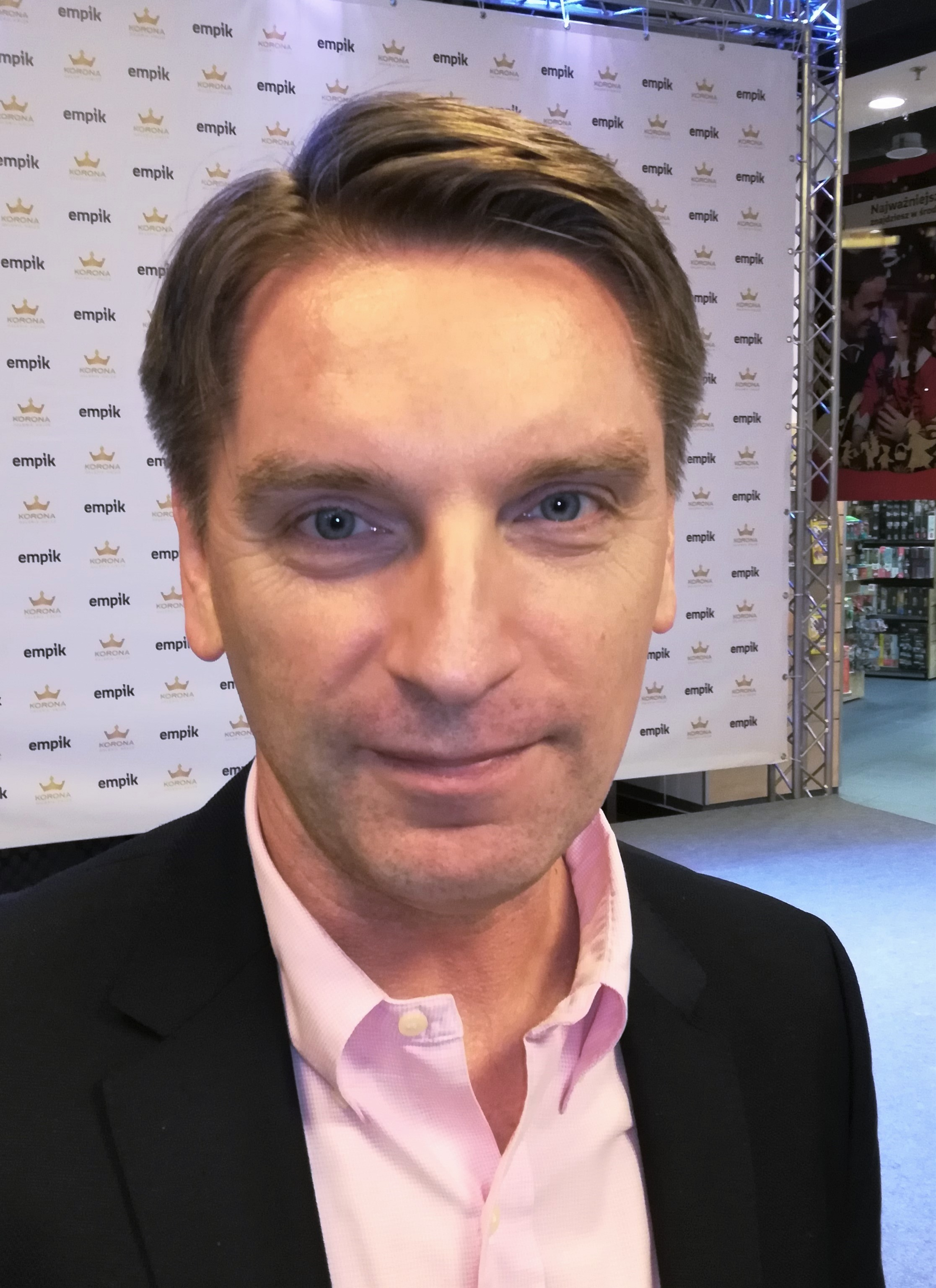
- Tomasz Lis in 2018
- Born: Tomasz Rafał Lis; 6 March 1966 (age 60); Zielona Góra, Poland
- Education: University of Warsaw
- Occupations: Journalist, author, TV presenter
- Spouse(s): Kinga Rusin (1994–2006); Hanna Smoktunowicz (2007–2022)

Tomasz Rafał Lis [ˈtɔmaʂ ˈlis] (born 6 March 1966 in Zielona Góra) is a Polish journalist and former TV anchor of “TVN Fakty” ("TVN Facts") and “Wydarzenia” ("Events").

== Life and career ==
Lis was born on 6 March 1966 in Zielona Góra to parents Stefan and Wanda (née Adamkiewicz). He attended the Edward Dembowski High School No. 1 in Zielona Góra. He subsequently graduated from the Faculty of Journalism and Political Sciences at the University of Warsaw. He began his career in 1984 publishing an article in a pro-Soviet newspaper Banner of Youth (Sztandar Młodych), an organ of the Polish Socialist Youth Union. In 1992, he received a scholarship and studied for a year at Loyola University New Orleans.

After the fall of communism in Poland, he worked on Public Television Polish Television (TVP) after winning an open competition for the post of a newsreader. From 1994 to 1997, he was a correspondent in Washington, D.C. for TVP. From 1997 to 2004, he was on Fakty TVN on the Polish television station TVN.

In 2003, he published his book Co z tą Polską? (What's with Poland?), which became a bestseller in Poland (selling over 100,000 copies).

From 2006-07, he was editor-in-chief of Wydarzenia. From late 2010 to February 2012, he was editor-in-chief of the current affairs weekly, Wprost. In March 2012, he took over as editor-in-chief of Newsweek Polska. In 2017, Lis was shortlisted for the European Press Prize, for his columns in Newsweek Polska.

== Awards ==
- Wiktor Award (9-time laureate)
- Super Wiktor Award (2006)
- Journalist of the Year (1997, 2007, 2009)
- Telekamera Award (2002, 2006)
- Kisiel Prize (2005)
- Officer's Cross of the Order of Polonia Restituta (2014)

== Controversies ==
On 7 September 2015, Newsweek Polska published an article by Wojciech Cieśl and Michał Krzymowski about the chairman of the Solidarity Trade Union, Piotr Duda (no apparent relation to Andrzej Duda, see below). The cover described the trade unionist's luxurious vacation. It was also suggested that part of the costs of the stay was covered with the union's money, and the holidaymaker did not pay for some of the standard-paid services due to the position held and the organization's connections with the hotel. In the court battle that had been going on for three years, on 5 July 2018, a final judgment was issued ordering Lis to publish a correction to a text which he had previously refused as the editor-in-chief of the weekly.

During the 2015 presidential election campaign, Los, on TVP2, program Lis, referred to a post on a Twitter profile, which, according to the journalist, belonged to the daughter of Andrzej Duda, Kinga Duda. She purportedly stated that if her father won the upcoming election for the presidency, she would make efforts for director Paweł Pawlikowski to return the Oscar for the controversial film Ida. The information was not checked and it turned out that the Twitter profile did not belong to Kinga Duda. Lis apologized to Andrzej Duda during a short interview in front of the TVP headquarters. Polish Television apologized to Duda on TVP1's Wiadomości.

In 2018, Lis participated in protests by the Committee for the Defence of Democracy against the new Law and Justice government.

== Family ==
Lis married Kinga Rusin in June 1994. The couple divorced on June 27, 2006. They have two daughters: Pola and Iga. The union ended in divorce. In 2007, he married Polish journalist, Hanna Smoktunowicz.
