= Radio Zet =

Polish commercial radio station

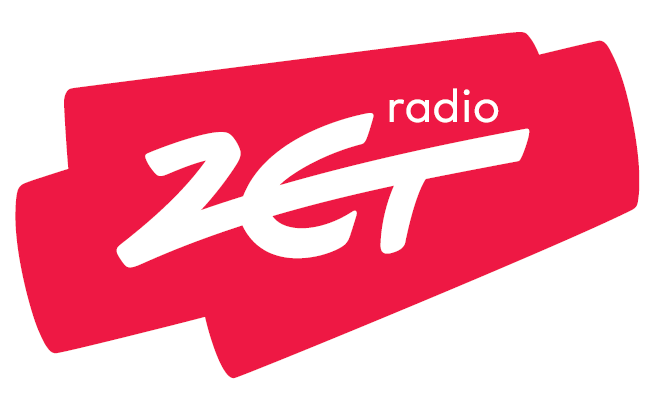
- Poland
- Broadcast area: Poland

Programming
- Language: Polish
- Format: adult contemporary

History
- First air date: 28 September 1990
- Former call signs: Radio Gazeta

Links
- Website: radiozet.pl

Radio Zet (Polish pronunciation: [radjɔ zɛt]) is a Polish commercial radio station launched in 1990, as the second privately owned radio in Poland. Since 2023, its majority shareholder has been Agora SA.

== History ==
Radio Zet was established in Warsaw, and aired its first broadcast on the 28th of September 1990. The station's founder and its first editor-in-chief was a prominent journalist Andrzej Wojciechowski.

In the first weeks of the radio station's operation, the slogan and audio signal (identifier) “Radio Gazeta” could be heard. During the 1990 election campaign, in order to maintain political independence, the founders of the radio station decided to change its name to Radio Zet (intentionally keeping the accented syllable of the original name).

Initially, Agora was the major shareholder (90%) of Radio Gazeta Company. Subsequently, Agora retained a 10% stake, and the remaining 90% was distributed among the co-founders. Soon the majority of the radio station's shares were taken over by Andrzej Woyciechowski's new company affiliated with the French media conglomerate Lagardère, owner of the French station Europe 1, among others.

Initially, the station rented premises in the then headquarters of the Polish Economic Society at Nowy Świat 49 in Warsaw. In the spring of 1992, Radio Zet moved and occupied two floors of the building at Piękna 66a. Since the middle of 2001, the radio has been housed in an office building at 8 Żurawiej St. Radio Zet's first frequency was 67 MHz in the UKF band.

In early 1994, Radio Zet and their direct commercial rivals RMF FM were granted nationwide licenses. The station from Krakow began nationwide broadcasting first, which started the rivalry between the broadcasters. Also in 1994, Andrzej Woyciechowski waged a dispute with Polish Radio's Program 1 over broadcasting the Lillehammer Winter Olympics.

In 2005, Radio Zet launched Andrzej Woyciechowski Prize awarded to outstanding journalists.

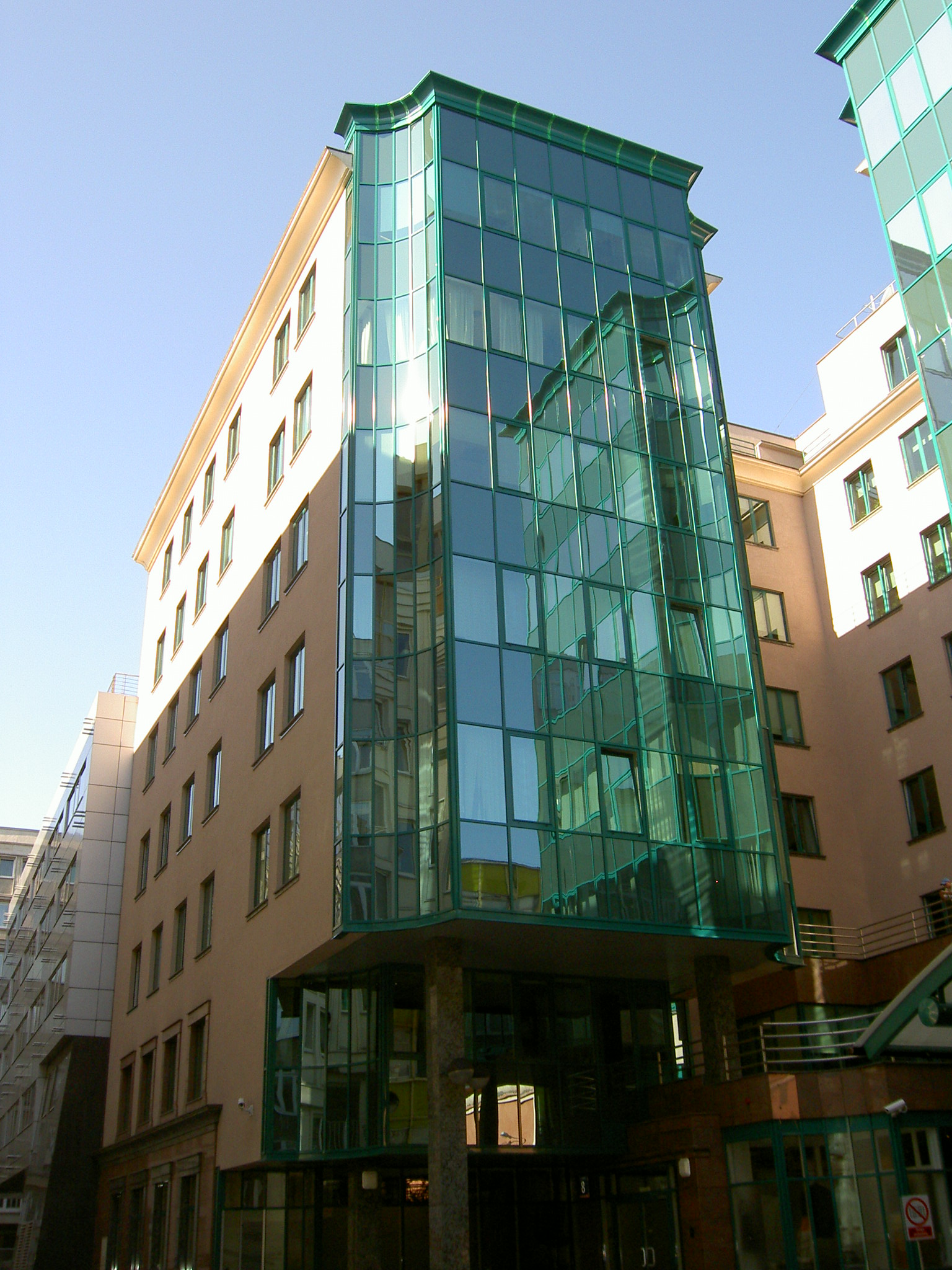
Radio Zet headquarters in Warsaw in 2006.

At the beginning of 2018, the Lagardère holding company put the Eurozet group, owner of Radio Zet among others, up for sale. The Czech Media Invest group became the buyer in April 2018, however, the station was put up for sale again as early as October 2018. Among those willing to buy were Agora, PMPG Polskie Media, Fratria, ZPR Media and Zbigniew Jakubas.

On February 20, 2019, in a stock exchange release, Agora SA (which already owned the station in the 1990s) announced that Czech Media Invest had entered into an agreement to sell its shares in Eurozet sp. z o.o. and the Eurozet shareholders' agreement to SFS Ventures, as the buyer of 60% of the shares, and Agora SA, as the buyer of 40% of the company's shares.

== Audience ==
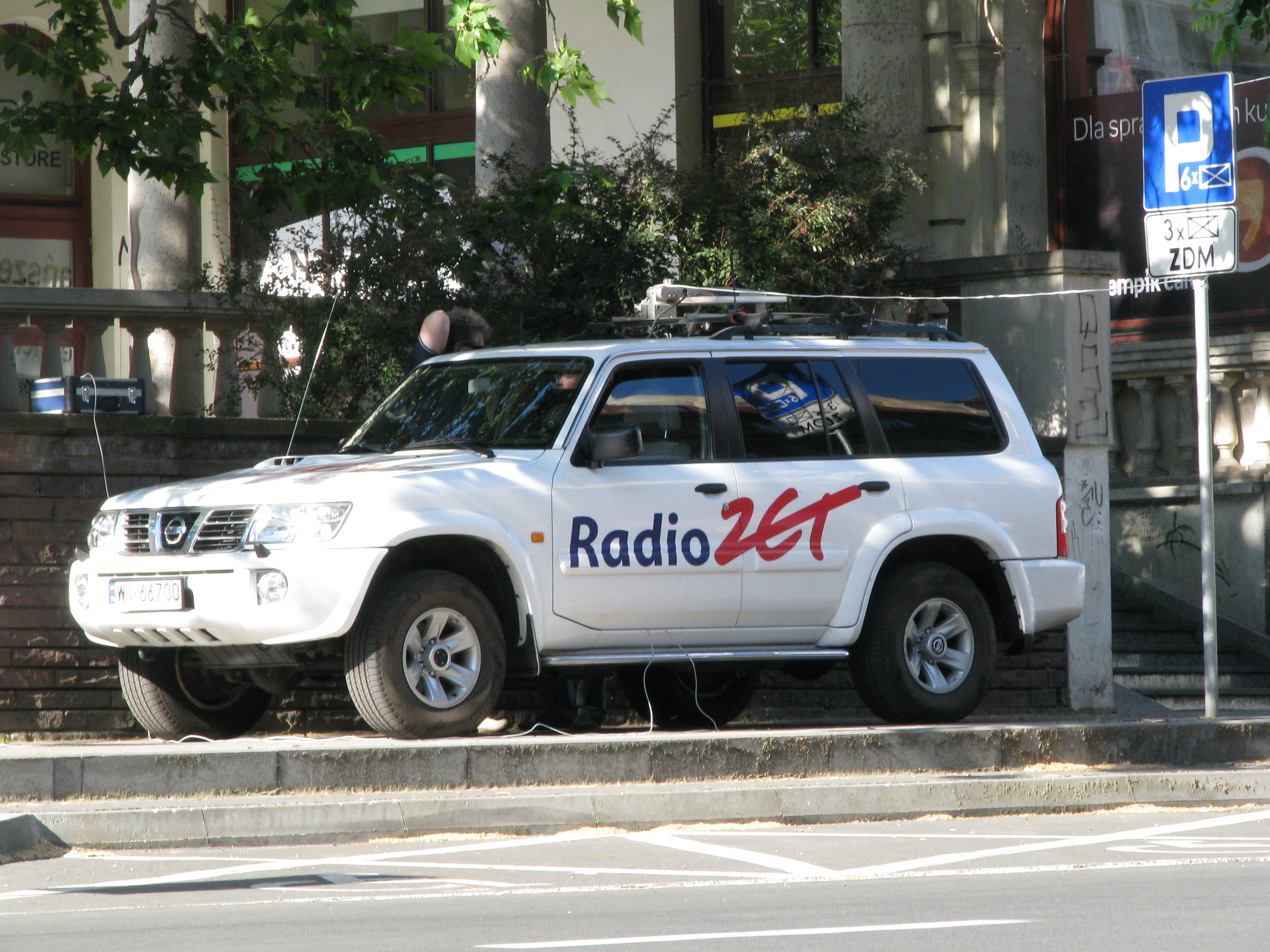
Radio Zet OB vehicle in Poznań, 2008.

According to Radio Track survey by Millward Brown SMG/KRC, the share of Radio Zet in terms of listening from December 2022 to February 2023 in the age group 15-75 was 13.6%, which gave the station the position of the second most listened to radio station in Poland.
