= Marek Czyż =

Polish journalist and news presenter

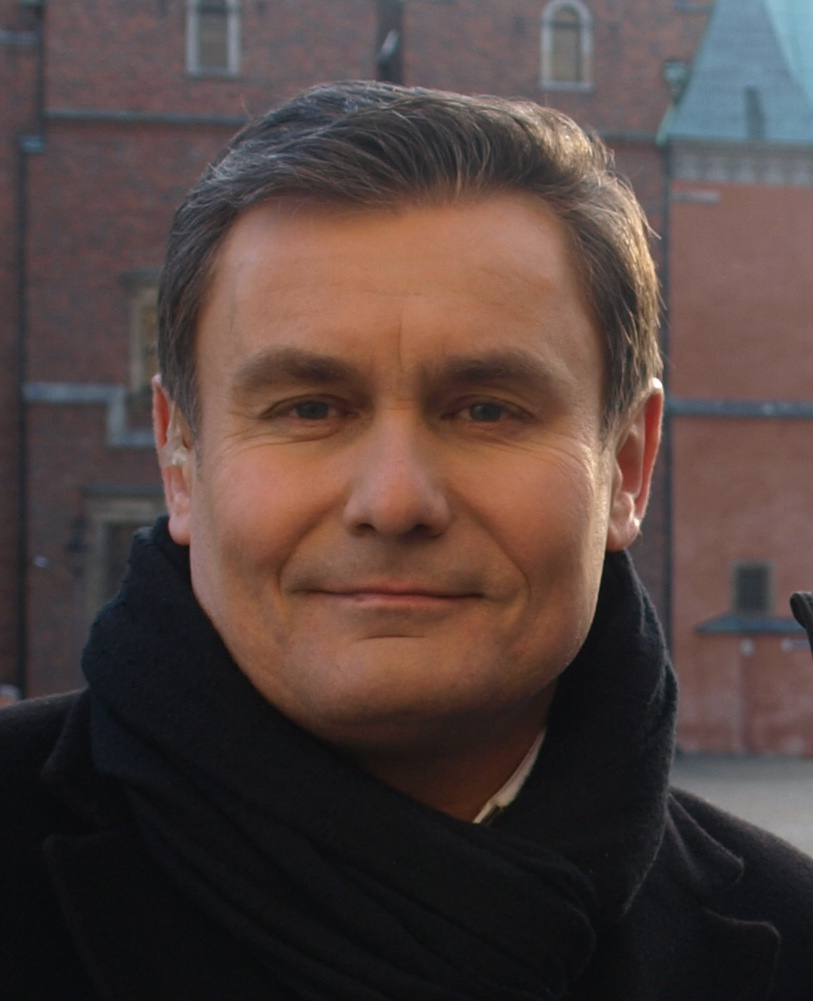
- Czyż in 2012
- Born: 25 May 1968 (age 58); Cieszyn, Poland
- Education: University of Silesia
- Occupations: Journalist; News presenter
- Years active: 1996–present

Marek Czyż (Polish: [ˈma.rɛk ˈt͡ʂɘ̟ʂ]; born 25 March 1968) is a Polish journalist and news presenter.

== Biography ==
Marek Czyż was born on 25 March 1968 in Cieszyn, Poland. He has graduated from the University of Silesia in Katowice. He started his media career in the mid-1990s at Katowice-based TOP Radio. Before that, he spent several years co-hosting the student Egida Radio programme.

From 1996 to 2008, he worked in Telewizja Polska (TVP), where he worked, among others, on programmes Monitor Wiadomości and Gość Jedynki in TVP1, various journalistic programmes in TVP3, Aktualności in TVP3 Katowice, and various news programmes dedicated to the accession of Poland to the European Union in 2004. He also worked as a foreign correspondent in the Telewizyjna Agencja Informacyjna (Television Information Agency).

From 2009 to 2011 he worked in TVS, where he hosted Silesia Informacje, Kiosk, and Gość TVS. From 30 September 2009 to 2011 he was also the director of TVS.

In 2011, he began working in TVP Info. Until 2016 he co-hosted Poranek Info and Forum. From 18 May 2014 to 24 July 2016 and again since 3 March 2024, he hosted Bez retuszu. On 25 April 2016, he returned to working in TVP3 Katowice, where he hosted Czyżby? and Aktualności. He left Telewizja Polska in August 2016.

In 2016 he began working in Nowa TV, where from 9 November 2016 to 30 November 2017, he co-hosted news programme 24 godziny online.pl. From 2016 to October 2017 he also hosted Tu i teraz, and Proste pytanie. In 2019 he hosted programme Czyż nie… in Nowa TV, and co-hosted radio audition Rozmowa dnia in Superstacja. From 2019 to 2020 he was the editor-in-chief of Silesia24.pl news web portal. In 2020, he joined to the editor team of the internet radio station Halo.Radio, where he hosted his own programmes. In 2020 he also founded internet news portal CzyzTak.pl. From January 2020 to July 2023 he was the information director of Radio Zet.

On 20 December 2023, he made an announcement about the management changes in TVP, which was emitted in place of the regular news programme Wiadomości on TVP1. The next day, he hosted the first episode of the new news programme 19.30, which replaced Wiadomości.
