= Dziennik Telewizyjny =

Polish television show

- Also known as: Dziennik, DT, DTV; Television Journal
- Genre: News program
- Country of origin: Polish People's Republic
- Original language: Polish

Production
- Running time: 30 minutes (per episode); 60 minutes (under martial law; 1981–1983)

Original release
- Network: TP1, TP2
- Release: 1 January 1958 – 17 November 1989

Related
- Wiadomości Dnia (1956–1958); Wiadomości (1989–2023); 19.30 (2023–)

Dziennik Telewizyjny (Polish pronunciation: [ˈd͡ʑɛn.ɲik tɛ.lɛ.viˈzɘj.nɘ], DT; lit. 'Television Journal'), commonly simplified to Dziennik (lit. 'Journal'), was a Polish daily television news program that was produced and broadcast by Telewizja Polska (TP; now abbreviated as TVP) between 1958 and 1989, during the time Poland was under a communist government. It was Poland's second regularly televised newscast by the Polish United Workers' Party during the Cold War. The final telecast aired on 17 November 1989 and the program was replaced by Wiadomości on the following day, 18 November 1989.

Dziennik succeeded a previously run short-term news show on 1 January 1958. Every 30-minute episode was transmitted on the first channel, TP1 (now TVP1), at 08:00 p.m CET (1958–1965) and subsequently at 07:30 p.m CET from 1965 until the fall of communism in 1989. The broadcast greatly resembled other communist news programs of the period, especially East German Aktuelle Kamera. The show had correspondents who were permanently based in several world cities such as New York, London, Moscow, Paris, and Rome.

The show's 31-year legacy can be seen in Poland today among the older generation, who often refers to every contemporary news program as "Dziennik", including newspapers and popular media. At the height of its popularity in the 1970s, Dziennik Telewizyjny was continuously watched by over 11 million people, approximately in every third household in Poland at the time.

== History ==
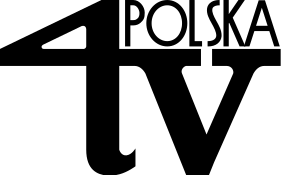
Telewizja Polska logo in the 1960s

=== Background ===
The origins of Polish television date back to the late 1930s when numerous tests were carried out on top of the Warsaw Prudential building to transmit monochrome images at a 20-kilometer radius. However, the beginning of World War II interrupted further attempts at establishing regular receivers. The prime state television corporation, the Telewizja Polska, was founded after the war in 1952. The foundation date corresponds to the time of the very first regularly televised broadcast which occurred at 07:00 p.m CET on 25 October 1952. Initially, the auditions were broadcast to a limited number of viewers and at set dates, often a month apart. On 23 January 1953 regular shows began to appear on the first and only channel, TVP1. Snippets of world and domestic events was given only spontaneously and at various times by different people. Most reliable sources of information in the 1950s were newspapers, most notably Trybuna Ludu (People's Tribune).

The first newscast was the short-lived Wiadomości Dnia, which aired on 30 April 1956 and lasted until the end of 1957. The first televised weather forecast also appeared on 4 September 1957. The Polish United Workers' Party and the Polish Politburo announced that Dziennik Telewizyjny, a government-controlled news program, will begin on 1 January 1958. The abbreviation for the program was "DTV" until the late 1970s (when it was shortened to just "DT"), but the show became widely known as the Dziennik (English: Journal) to the general public for the next three decades. The 55 km-range signal antenna in the shape of a butterfly was situated on the spire of the Palace of Culture and Science in Warsaw, at an altitude of 227 meters. The antenna also appeared on the call sign ident (identification screen and logo) at the beginning of every broadcast until 1972.

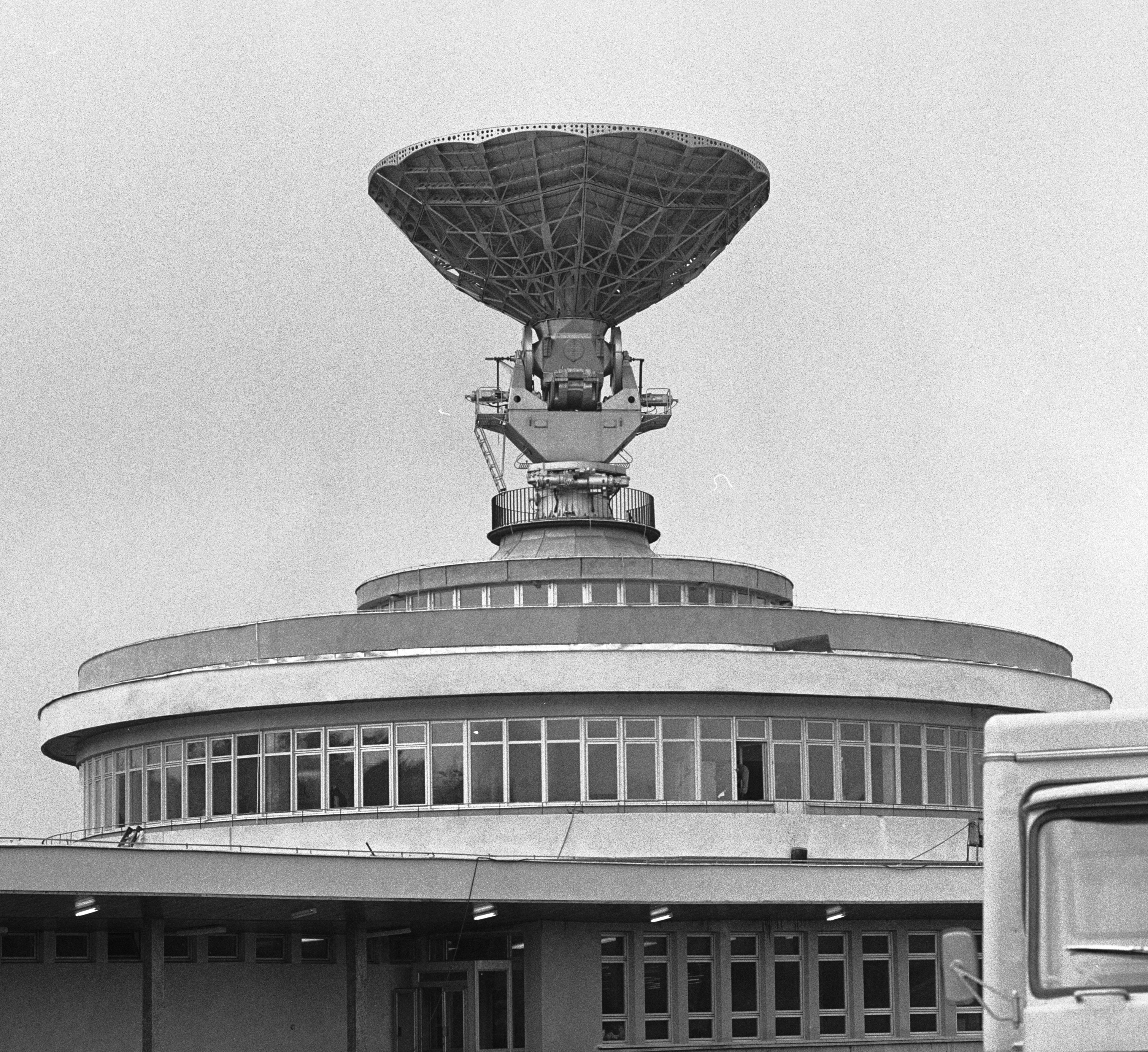
Poland's first satellite ground station in Psary-Kąty, 1975

=== Schedule and timing ===
Each main episode or edition of the program was originally transmitted at 8:00 p.m. and starting from 1965 at 7:30 p.m. CET. Telewizja Polska continued to emit its contemporary flagship news show, Wiadomości, at 7:30 p.m.

With the development of Polish television, other related spin-offs and side shows accompanying the Dziennik were introduced. On 2 October 1970 the second channel, TVP2, was launched. From 1965 until 1976, the evening edition of Dziennik was replaced by Monitor, which was presented by Karol Małcużyński and Edmund Męclewski. On 26 June 1986, a second but shorter and more direct newsflash called Teleexpress aired on TVP1. Since 30 March 1987, a third program also showing snippets, Panorama, began airing on TVP2 as an alternative to Teleexpress.

Under martial law in Poland, from December 1981 Dziennik was presented by officers of the Polish Armed Forces or newsreaders in military uniforms and broadcast 24-hours a day. The running time has also been extended to 60 minutes. The program returned to its original form in 1983.

The first colour episode of Dziennik was transmitted on 6 December 1971.

The final telecast aired on 17 November 1989.

=== Controversies and legacy ===
The program was highly controversial throughout its existence as it did not report news that could trigger anti-government sentiment. Similar newscasts were used for identical purposes were present in all countries of the Eastern Bloc, most known being Aktuelle Kamera from the German Democratic Republic and Vremya from the Soviet Union.

Dziennik was known to be strikingly objective about world affairs and, almost in every case, each episode featured a coverage from foreign countries where corruption, war and scandals were abundant. The goal was to minimize the effects of the issues that were occurring in Poland at the time, such as the 1968 Polish political crisis, 1970 protests, June 1976 protests and the near-bankruptcy of the Polish People's Republic in the 1980s. The newsreaders often used emotive and loaded text with a pro-government and pro-socialist bias. The tone also used was very formal, serious and at times nostalgic, particularly during national holidays. The actors rarely smiled and addressed guests or referred to people as obywatelu ("citizen", equivalent to comrade in other communist states) instead of Pan/Pani (Sir/Mrs) – T–V distinction.

On 28 October 1989, actress Joanna Szczepkowska was invited to the studio to discuss her theatrical career. Instead, she asked the host if she could deliver a message to the viewers. After being granted permission Szczepkowska stated "Ladies and Gentlemen. On 4 June 1989 communism has ended in Poland." This occurred shortly after Tadeusz Mazowiecki was elected as the first non-communist Prime Minister of Poland. The situation was unusual as the TV anchor agreed to Szczepkowska's message on a communist-funded program, which glorified Marxism-Leninism and socialism for decades. The message was broadcast to millions across the country and became symbolic of the period of transition to democracy.

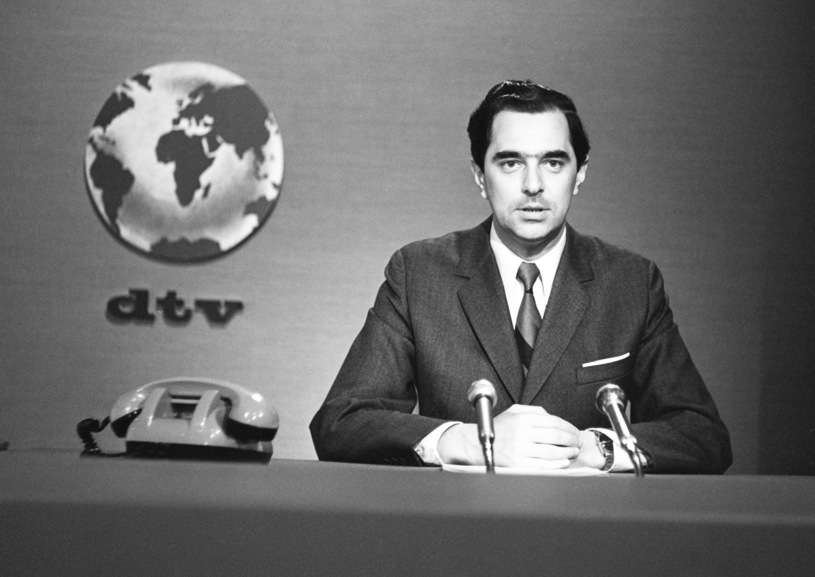
The studio in the 1960s

Numerous epigrams and jokes about Dziennik surfaced in the 1980s; one suggesting that "the only factual aspect of the show was the date". Between 1995 and 2005, satirist Jacek Fedorowicz presented a satirical television show on TVP1, also titled Dziennik Telewizyjny, which often recalled the most infamous texts and lines from Dziennik.

In contemporary Poland, the older generation tends to name every news program "Dziennik", regardless of the station or channel. The word "Dziennik" can also be synonymous with terms like propaganda and disinformation, especially when referring to televised news.

== Notable newsreaders ==
1970s

- Jacek Suzin
- Irena Falska
- Andrzej Bilik
- Andrzej Kozera

1980s

- Marian Tumanowicz
- Krzysztof Bartnicki
- Zygmunt Chajzer
- Janusz Świerczyński
- Irena Jagielska
- Karol Nowakowski

== See also ==
- Polish People's Republic
- Aktuelle Kamera
- Vremya
