= FM- and TV-mast Kosztowy =

FM and TV Mast Kosztowy
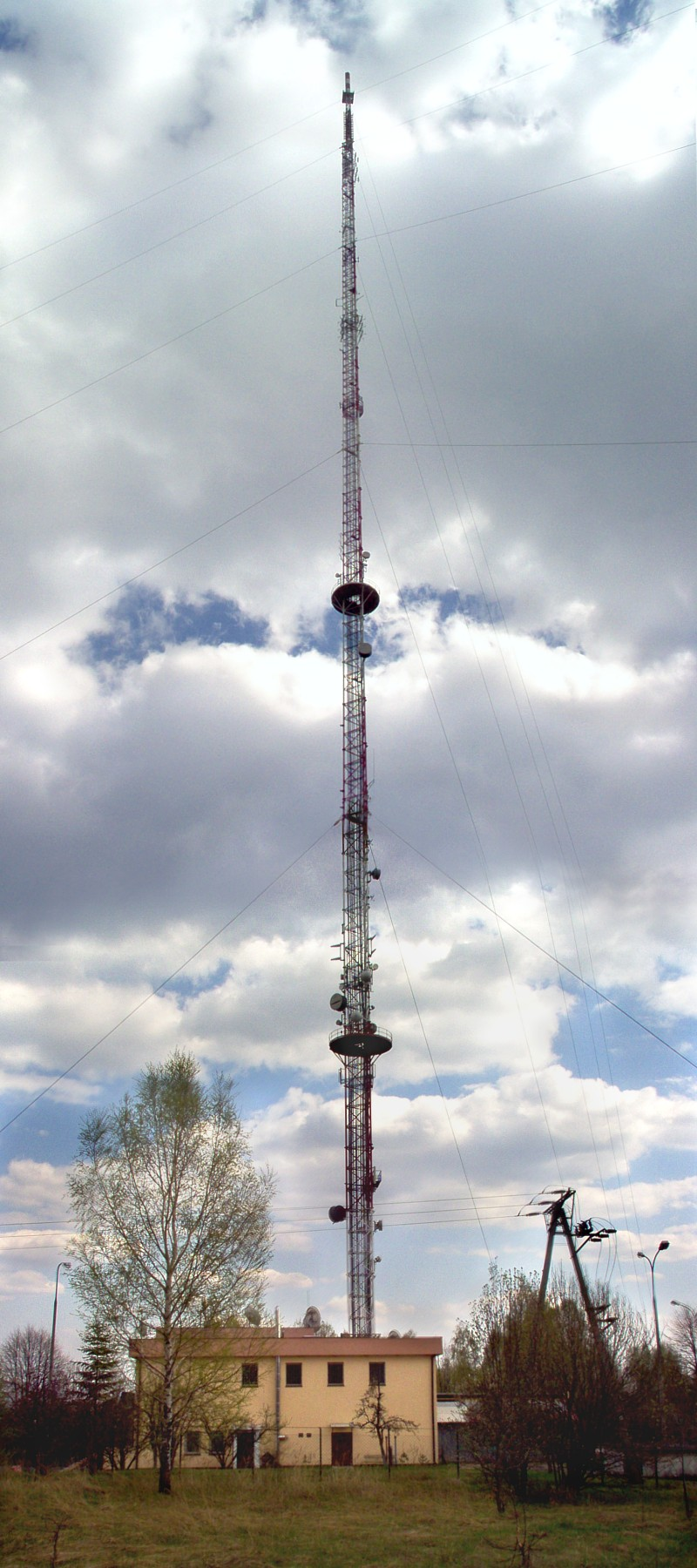
- Interactive map of the FM and TV Mast Kosztowy area

General information
- Status: Completed
- Type: Mast
- Location: Mysłowice/Kosztowy
- Completed: 23 June 1976

Height
- Height: 358.7 m (1,176.84 ft)

RTCN Kosztowy
- Coordinates: 50°11′17″N 19°07′00″E
- Voivodeship: Silesian
- County: Mysłowice City County
- Gmina: Mysłowice/Kosztowy

The FM and TV mast Katowice / Kosztowy (RTCN Katowice / Kosztowy) is a 358.7-metre-tall (1,177 ft) guyed mast for FM and TV situated at Mysłowice - near Kosztowy, Poland. It replaced the TVP Katowice Mast, which was dismantled in the 1970s.

The TVP Katowice Mast which it replaced was a 225-metre-high (738 ft) guyed steel framework mast with a triangular cross-section near Katowice, Poland. It was not the transmission site for the medium-wave frequency 1080 kHz. This frequency is transmitted by the transmitter Koszęcin.

The FM and TV mast Katowice / Kosztowy is since the collapse of the Warsaw radio mast the tallest structure in Poland. It was inaugurated on June 23, 1976. Originally its height was 269 metres. In 1987 it was converted to its actual value.

== Transmitted programs ==
=== Digital television DVB-T/T2 ===
Multiplex	Programs in Multiplex	Frequency MHz	Channel	ERP kW	Polarisation	Antenna Diagram around (ND) / directional (D)	Modulation	FEC
MUX 1	Antena HD; Fokus TV; Stopklatka TV; TV Trwam; Eska TV; TTV; Polo TV	650	43	100	Horizontal	ND	HEVC 256 - QAM	1/128
MUX 2	Polsat; TVN; TV4; TV Puls; TVN 7; Puls 2; TV6; Super Polsat	490	23	100	Horizontal	ND	HEVC 256- QAM	1/128
MUX 3	TVP1 HD; TVP2 HD; TVP3 Katowice; TVP Historia; TVP Sport; TVP Info HD	634	41	100	Horizontal	D	HEVC 256 - QAM	1/128
MUX 4	Eleven Sports 1; Eleven Sports 2; Eurosport 1; Eurosport 2; Polsat News; Polsat Sport; Polsat Sport Extra; TVN Turbo; TVN 24; Wydarzenia 24	474	21	100	Horizontal	ND	HEVC 256 - QAM	1/128
MUX 6	Alfa TVP; Belsat TV; TVP ABC; TVP Dokument; TVP Kobieta; TVP Kultura; TVP Nauka; TVP Polonia; TVP Rozrywka	498	24	100	Horizontal	ND	HEVC 256 - QAM	1/128
MUX 8	Metro TV; Zoom TV; Nowa TV; WP	184,5	6	20	Vertical	D	64 - QAM	5/6
MUX TVS	TVS; Polsat HD; TV Republika; TV Okazje	546	30	5	Horizontal	D	QPSK	5/6

=== Digital radio programs ===
Multiplex	Programs in Multiplex	Frequency MHz	Channel	ERP kW	Polarisation	Antenna Diagram around (ND) / directional (D)	Bit Rate [MBit/s]
MUX DAB+	Polskie Radio Program I; Polskie Radio Program II; Polskie Radio Program III; Polskie Radio Katowice; Polskie Radio 24; Polskie Radio Rytm; Polskie Radio Dla Zagranicy; DMB - Polskie Radio Program IV	209,936	10	10	Horizontal	ND	128

=== Analogue radio programs ===
Program	Frequency MHz	ERP kW	Polarisation	Antenna Diagram around (ND) / directional (D)
RMF FM	93,00	60	Horizontal	ND
94,5 Roxy FM	94,50	0,50	Horizontal	D
Vox FM	95,50	1	Horizontal	D
Polskie Radio Program I	97,90	60	Horizontal	ND
Radio Rezonans	99,10	0,30	Horizontal	D
Polskie Radio Program III	99,70	60	Horizontal	ND
Polskie Radio Katowice	102,20	60	Horizontal	ND
Radio Maryja	103,70	3	Horizontal	D
Polskie Radio Program II	105,60	60	Horizontal	ND
Radio eM	107,60	60	Horizontal	ND

== See also ==
- List of masts
