= Lex TVN =

2021 Polish media law

Parliament of Poland
- Long title: Act of 11 August 2021 on the amendment of the "Broadcasting and the Cinematography Act"
- Considered by: Sejm
- Considered by: Senate
- Vetoed by: President Andrzej Duda
- Vetoed: 27 December 2021

Legislative history

First chamber: Sejm
- Passed: 18 December 2021
- Voting summary: 229 voted for; 212 voted against; 11 abstained

Final stages
- Senate amendments considered by the Sejm: 18 December 2021
- Status: Vetoed

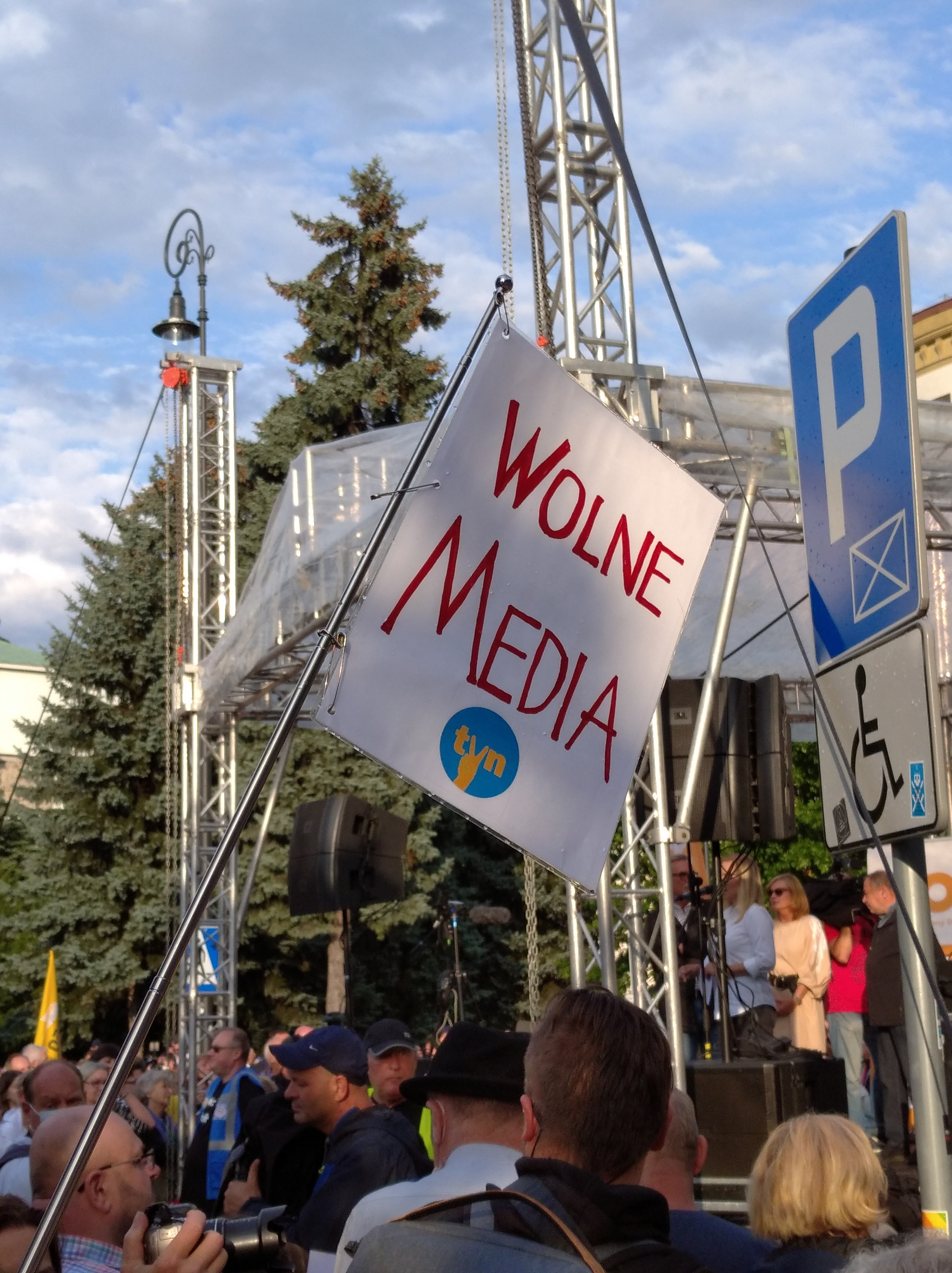
A "free media" banner held by demonstrators protesting against the "Lex TVN" on 10 August in Poland.

Act of 11 August 2021 on the amendment of the "Broadcasting and the Cinematography Act" (Polish: Ustawa z dnia 11 sierpnia 2021 r. o zmianie ustawy o radiofonii i telewizji oraz ustawy o kinematografii), better known by media term Lex TVN (lit. "TVN Law"), was a controversial Polish media law amendment of the Polish Broadcasting Act. It was meant to remove loopholes that allowed companies from outside the European Economic Area to hold more than a 49% stake in Polish radio and television stations by use of dummy corporations. The government denies the measure is aimed at any one broadcaster, saying it seeks to prevent potential media acquisitions by non-EU countries such as Russia, China and Arab nations; however, many critics describe this amendment as an attempt to harass TVN and its parent company TVN Grupa Discovery in particular, given that it is the main television platform for the opposition to the ruling Law and Justice party.

On 18 December 2021, the bill was passed via the Sejm. The Sejm voted in favor 229–212 with 11 abstentions to override the Senate's veto. Law and Justice (PiS) party and allied opposition group Kukiz'15 voted for the bill, against was the remaining opposition with the exception of far right Confederation, which abstained.

The bill was vetoed by Polish President Andrzej Duda on 27 December 2021.

== Background ==
TVN tends to be strongly critical of the Polish government since the Law and Justice (PiS) party came to power in 2015. Historian and columnist Timothy Garton Ash, writing for The Guardian, praised Fakty TVN's critical coverage of government issues when harshly criticising Telewizja Polska's Wiadomości (News).

The Facts is not BBC-style impartial: it clearly favours a more liberal, pro-European Poland and is strongly anti-PiS. But unlike the so-called News, it is still definitely professional, high quality, reality-based journalism.

== The amendment ==
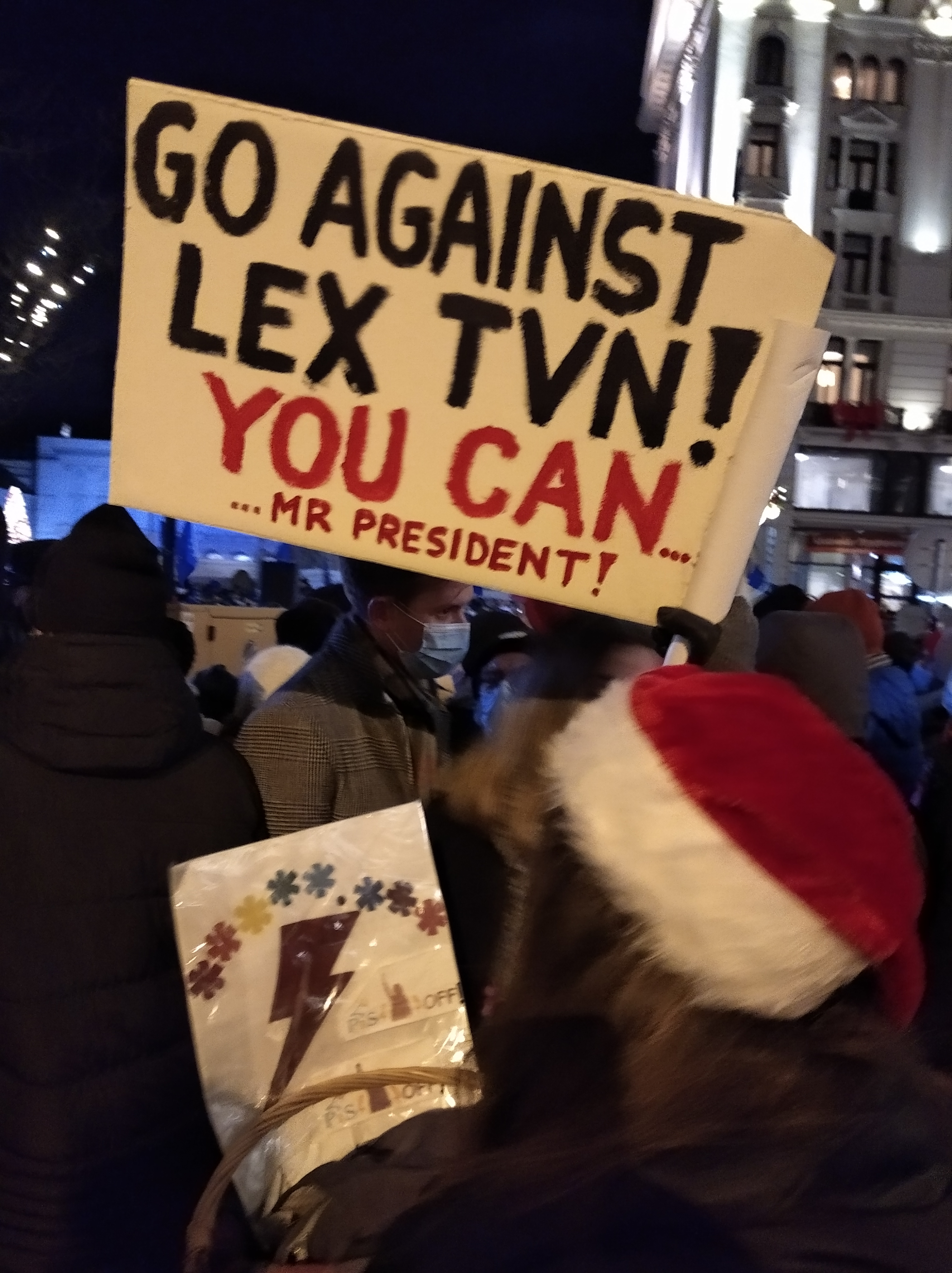
English banner held by demonstrators protesting against the "Lex TVN" on 19 December in Poland.

In July 2021, a group of PiS lawmakers submitted to parliament a draft amendment that would prevent companies from outside the European Economic Area of taking control of Polish radio and television stations. This would mean that Discovery, the owner of TVN, might be forced to divest its ownership. The party Agreement, then PiS' coalition partner, was opposed to this and instead proposed a change that would allow companies from countries in the Organisation for Economic Co-operation and Development (OECD) to own more than 49% of shares in Polish media companies, which would mean no change to the American ownership of the channel.

The Law and Justice leader Jarosław Kaczyński assessed Agreement's proposal as ridiculous noting that "Russia aspires to join the OECD".

The Second Cabinet of Mateusz Morawiecki under the ruling Law and Justice party argues that it will protect Polish broadcasters from takeovers by companies based in hostile foreign powers such as China and Russia. However, opposition, as well as representatives from European Union and the United States criticized it as it will force American company Discovery to divest itself from Polish biggest television network, TVN, which has been often critical of the PiS-led government; Polish opposition and some international observers expressed fear that the amendment is threatening press freedom in Poland. The amendment has been criticized for "threatening the largest ever US investment in Poland".

The law has also led to protests within Poland with a number of demonstrations on 10 August.

In August 2021, the bill was passed via the Sejm making TVN's rights expire on 26 September. Due to strong opposition, this result threatened the stability of the United Right coalition after Deputy Prime Minister Jarosław Gowin had been sacked and had taken away the 13 members of his Agreement party.

On 30 August 2021, the Chairman of the National Council of Radio Broadcasting and Television sent to the TV operators a decision to move the licence of sister channel TVN24 into the Discovery Communications Benelux B.V. license, based in the Netherlands. The decision ensures the continuity of broadcasting the TVN24 program after September 26, 2021, regardless of the results of the ongoing conflict with Law and Justice government. On September 24, 2021 - two days before the expiration of the previous licence - TVN24 was granted a new Polish licence.

On 18 December 2021, the bill was passed via the Sejm. The Sejm voted in favor 229–212 with 11 abstentions to override the Senate's veto. Law and Justice (PiS) party and allied opposition group Kukiz'15 voted for the bill, against was the remaining opposition with the exception of far right Confederation, which abstained.

On 27 December 2021 the bill was vetoed by Polish President Andrzej Duda, who said he generally believed limiting foreign ownership of media was sensible, but that any regulation should concern future investments in the sector, not current owners. He justified his decision explaining that the amendment would be against the spirit of a 1990 international agreement with the United States concerning the protection of investments.

== See also ==
- 2023 Polish public media crisis
