= Maciej Orłoś =

Polish journalist and television presenter (born 1960)

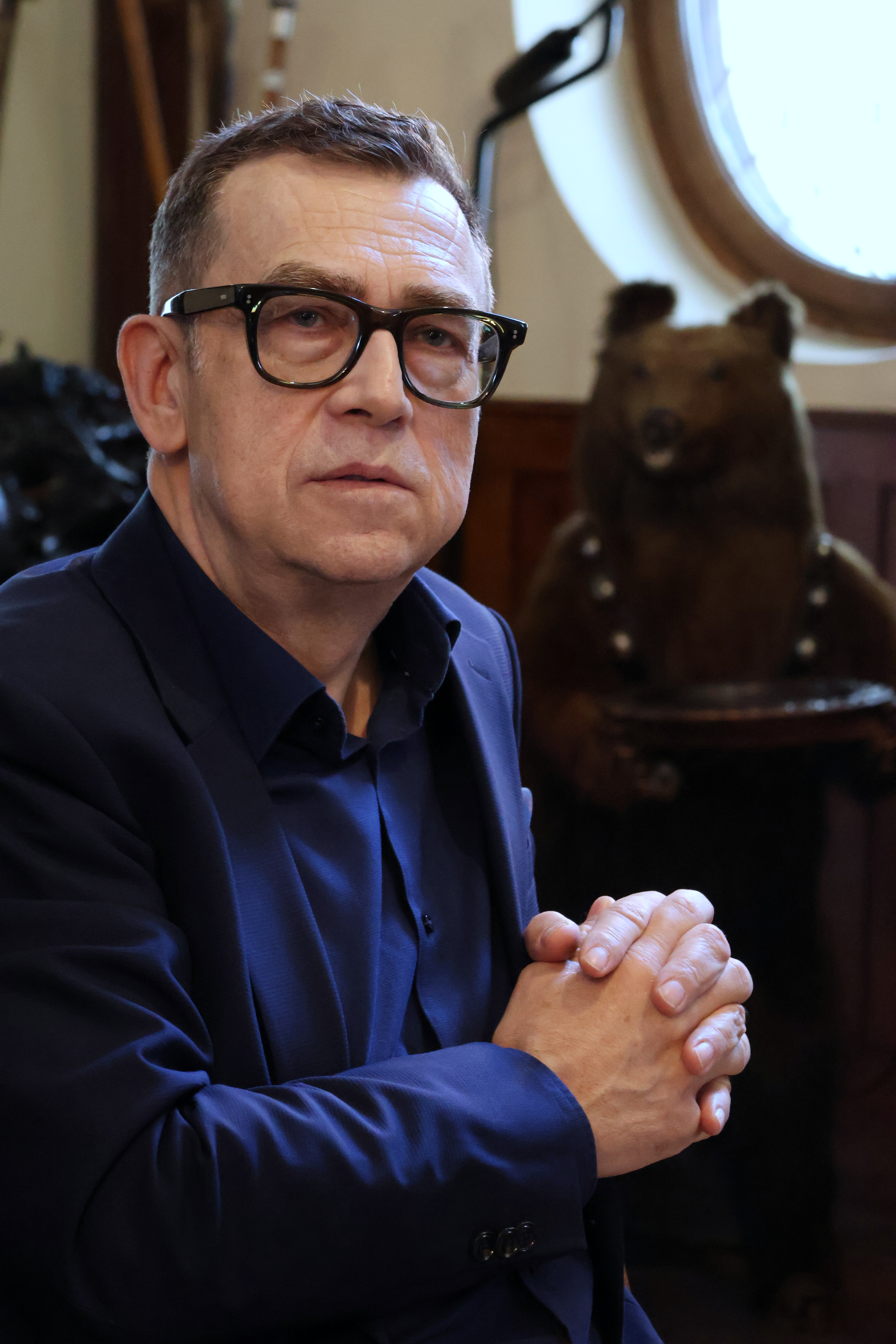
- Orłoś in 2025
- Born: Maciej Henryk Orłoś; 16 July 1960 (age 66); Warsaw, Poland
- Education: Aleksander Zelwerowicz National Academy of Dramatic Art
- Occupations: Journalist; television presenter; actor; author
- Known for: Presenting Teleexpress
- Father: Kazimierz Orłoś
- Awards: Officer's Cross of the Order of Polonia Restituta

Maciej Henryk Orłoś (born 16 July 1960) is a Polish journalist, television presenter, actor and author. He is best known as a long-time presenter of the Polish Television news programme Teleexpress, which he hosted from 1991 to 2016 and again from January 2024.

== Early life and acting ==
Orłoś was born in Warsaw and is the son of the writer Kazimierz Orłoś. He graduated from the Aleksander Zelwerowicz National Academy of Dramatic Art in 1983, having made his professional stage debut at Warsaw's New Theatre the previous year. He subsequently performed at the Ateneum and Popular theatres in Warsaw.

Orłoś began working as a voice actor as a child and made his film debut as the young Casimir III the Great in Kazimierz Wielki (1975). His later screen work included the television series Pogranicze w ogniu, Tadeusz Konwicki's Lawa (1989), Eminent Domain (1990), a small role in Schindler's List (1993), the series Zespół adwokacki (1993–1994), and Our God's Brother (1997).

== Broadcasting career ==
Orłoś joined Teleexpress in 1991 and became one of the programme's principal presenters. At TVP he also hosted the interview programme Oko w oko, the magazine A to Polska właśnie!, cultural programmes and television coverage of major Polish music and film festivals. He left TVP on 31 August 2016 after more than 25 years with the broadcaster. In an interview published later that year, Orłoś said that changes in editorial management and restrictions on coverage had contributed to his decision.

In December 2016 he joined WP, where he presented news programmes and the talk show Orłoś Kontra. He left the channel in March 2018 after it reduced its in-house production. He then developed current-affairs programmes for YouTube. In 2019 Orłoś and Michał Zieliński began presenting the satirical programme ZETexpress on Radio Zet, and in July 2020 he joined the internet station Radio Nowy Świat.

Orłoś returned to Teleexpress on 4 January 2024, when the programme resumed broadcasting after the 2023 Polish public media crisis. In late 2024 he also hosted the TVP1 interview programme Daję słowo. Maciej Orłoś.

== Writing and honours ==
Orłoś has written children's books and guides to public speaking. His publications include the children's books Kuba i Mela dają radę and Kuba i Mela. Dodaj do znajomych, and the public-speaking guide Jak występować i zabłysnąć. In 2025 he published Poza scenariuszem, a book-length interview with Adrian Jasiński.

He received Wiktor television awards in 1991, 2004 and 2007, a SuperWiktor in 2012, and Telekamera awards in 2005 and 2016. In 2014 he was awarded the Officer's Cross of the Order of Polonia Restituta for services to public television and for professional and social achievements.

== Selected filmography ==
Year	Title	Role
1975	Kazimierz Wielki	Young Casimir III the Great
1988–1991	Pogranicze w ogniu	Riese, an Abwehr officer
1989	Lawa	Feliks Kołakowski / chorus member
1990	Eminent Domain	Guard
1993	Schindler's List	German official
1993–1994	Zespół adwokacki	Jacek Korewicz
1997	Our God's Brother	Jerzy
