= TVP3 Katowice =

- Logo used since from January 2016
- Silesian Voivodeship; Poland
- City: Katowice, Poland
- Channels: Analog: 2; Digital: 41 (UHF); Virtual: 3

Programming
- Languages: Polish, Silesian, German
- Subchannels: TVP HD; TVP Rozrywka
- Network: TVP
- Affiliations: Telewizja Polska

Ownership
- Owner: Telewizja Polska
- Sister stations: TVS

History
- Founded: 1957
- First air date: 3 December 1957
- Last air date: 15 December 2023 (SD)
- Former names: Telewizji Katowice (1957–1990); GTR-3 (1990–1991); Tele 3 (1991–2003); TVP Katowice (2007–2016)
- Former channel number: Analog: UHF 60 (1957–2013)
- Former affiliations: Independent (1957–1994)

Links
- Webcast: regiony.tvp.pl (Katowice)
- Website: https://katowice.tvp.pl/

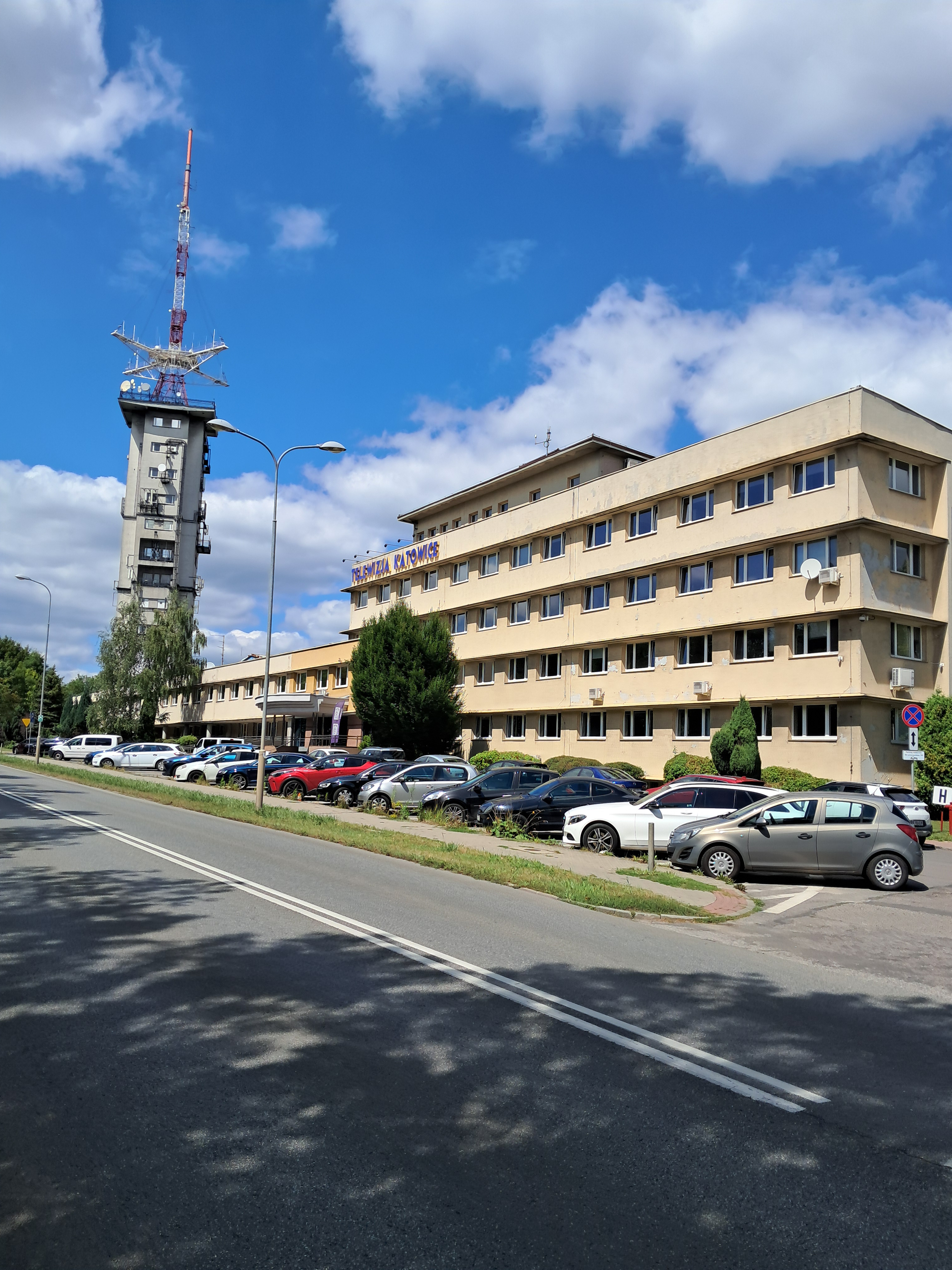
The building housing the headquarters of TVP3 Katowice.

TVP3 Katowice a.k.a. TV Katowice also Television Katowice is one of the regional branches of the TVP, Poland's public television broadcaster. It serves the entire Silesian Voivodeship with particular dedication to the Metropolis GZM and Katowice metropolitan area.

== History ==
Telewizja Katowice opened on 3 December 1957 at 4pm, covering much of southern Poland, as well as parts of Czechoslovakia via overspill.

The channel was one of the nine regional TVP3 stations that converted to high definition on 15 December 2023. As an effect of the 2023 Polish public media crisis, TVP3 Katowice was suspended on 20 December 2023, being replaced by TVP2 in the interim; the station restarted on 26 December.

== Languages ==
Generally, broadcasts are conducted in Polish. Some broadcasts are conducted in the Silesian language (example U nos w Bytkowie, Patefon ujka Ericha, Holy War) and some in German (example Schlesien Journal).

== Broadcast area ==
Broadcast area: generally Upper Silesia - mainly Silesian Voivodeship and Opole Voivodeship, small parts (about 1/4) of Lesser Poland Voivodeship, very small part of Łódź Voivodeship and Świętokrzyskie Voivodeship in Poland, and also very small part of Moravian-Silesian Region in Czech Republic and very small part of Slovakia (north-western part of Žilina Region).

== Terrestrial transmitters and editorial offices ==
The TV center is located in Katowice, Television street no 1 in main part of Metropolis GZM. The main tower has a height of 90 meters. The secondary transmitter lies in Kosztowy - district of Mysłowice (suburb of Katowice), which has a height of 355 meters (the second tallest radio mast in Poland). Beyond this the signal is repeated by six more transmitters. Local redaction section (editorial offices) are found in Rybnik, Bielsko-Biała and Częstochowa.

Voivodeship	Location of transmitters	Canal	MHz	Power EiRP (kW)
Silesian	RTCN Kosztowy	41	634 MHz	100 kW
Silesian	Częstochowa - RTCN Wręczyca	41	634 Mhz	80 kW
Silesian	Racibórz (TSR Racibórz, Cmentarna street)	41	634 MHz	0.026kW
Silesian	Szczyrk (TSR Szczyrk / Biła)	41	634 MHz	0.010 kW
Silesian	Węgierska Górka (Mount Przybędza)	41	634 MHz	0.032 kW
Silesian	Żywiec - Mount Grojec	41	634 MHz	0.010 kW
Silesian	Szczyrk - RTON Skrzyczne	41	634 MHz	60 kW

== Logo history ==
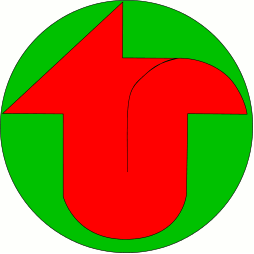
1985

–1990

1990

–1991

1991

–1994

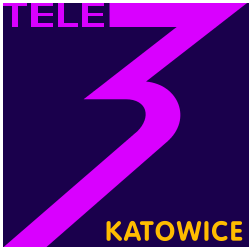
1994

–1998

1998

–2000

2000

–2001

2001

–2003

2003

–2007

2007 – 2013
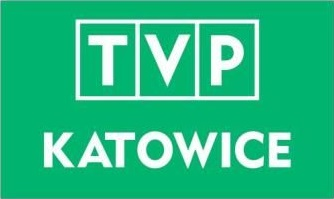
2013 – 2016
2016
