= Wiadomości =

1989–2023 Polish TV series or program

- Genre: News program
- Theme music composer: Adam Skorupa (May 2019-2023); Radzimir Dębski (2015–May 2019); Piotr Rubik (2004–2014)
- Country of origin: Poland
- Original languages: Polish; English (nightly broadcasts on TVP Polonia)

Production
- Production locations: Warsaw, Poland
- Editors: Robert Kalinowski; Małgorzata Rogatty; Edyta Suchacka; Maciej Walaszczyk
- Running time: 25 minutes (07:30pm); 10 minutes (08:00am, 12:00pm, 03:00pm)
- Production company: Telewizja Polska (TVP)

Original release
- Network: TVP1; TVP Polonia; TVP Info
- Release: 18 November 1989 – 19 December 2023

Related
- Dziennik Telewizyjny; 19.30; Teleexpress; Panorama; Gość Wiadomości

Wiadomości (Polish pronunciation: [vjadɔˈmɔɕt͡ɕi], lit. 'News') is a Polish daily television news program that was produced by public-service broadcaster Telewizja Polska (TVP) and was broadcast on TVP1 from 18 November 1989 until 19 December 2023. The main edition was broadcast daily at 7:30 p.m. CET. It premiered on 18 November 1989 and replaced the Dziennik Telewizyjny (lit. 'Television Journal'), which was aired during the communist era for over 31 years and was considered to be one of the communist government's mouthpiece.

In September 2020, Wiadomości was the most popular news program in Poland, with an average of 2.66 million viewers a day.

In its final years, especially during the Law and Justice (PiS) government (2015–2023), the program (along with TVP's other news outlets) was accused of becoming a propaganda outlet for the ruling party. Following the formation of the coalition government on 13 December 2023, and subsequent management changes at TVP on 19 December, the main edition for 20 December was pre-empted, and was replaced by a short message from news presenter Marek Czyż about upcoming changes at TVP and an invitation to the next day's edition. The following day, it was announced that Wiadomości would be ending, and be replaced by a new daily bulletin, the title of which was revealed to be 19.30 later in that day.

== History ==
Wiadomości replaced Dziennik Telewizyjny (lit. 'Television Journal'), a newscast that was a symbol of communist propaganda in the Polish People's Republic during the Cold War. The first edition of Wiadomości aired on 18 November 1989 and was hosted by journalist Wojciech Reszczyński. Reszczyński greeted the audiences with a message: "Good evening, I hope that this program will gain your approbation in the upcoming days. The information contained in this program will be either good or bad, but always true and we count on help and cooperation."

=== Cancellation ===
The last main edition of Wiadomości was broadcast at 7:30 p.m. on 19 December 2023. On 20 December 2023, the newly elected government took over TVP, which led to the program not being broadcast. A day later Wiadomości was replaced by 19.30.

== Controversy ==
=== Accusations of propaganda ===
Since 2016, the program has been accused of becoming a propaganda outlet for the ruling Law and Justice party. Historian and columnist Timothy Garton Ash, writing for The Guardian, praised the critical coverage of government issues from TVN's competing newscast Fakty (lit. 'Facts') when harshly criticising TVP's Wiadomości (lit. 'News').

The Facts is not BBC-style impartial: it clearly favours a more liberal, pro-European Poland and is strongly anti-PiS. But unlike the so-called News, it is still definitely professional, high quality, reality-based journalism.
