= Kazimierz Orłoś =

Polish writer (born 1935)

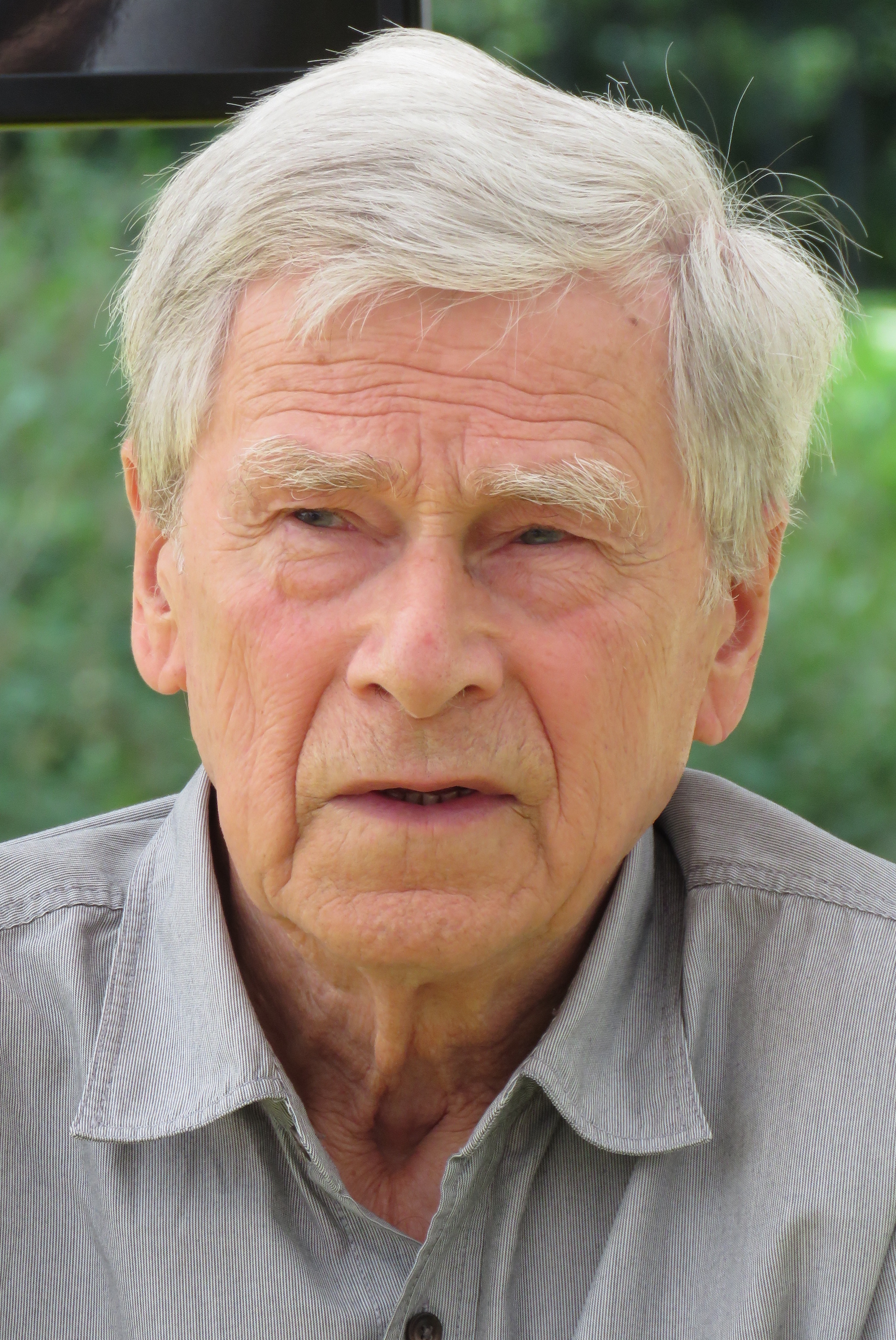
- Kazimierz Orłoś, 2019
- Born: 26 December 1935 (age 90)
- Citizenship: Polish
- Occupation: writer
- Writing career
- Period: 1958–present

Kazimierz Henryk Orłoś (born 26 December 1935) is a writer.

The son of Henryk Orłoś and Seweryna née Mackiewicz, nephew of Stanisław Mackiewicz and Józef Mackiewicz. Father of Maciej Orłoś.

== Books ==
- Między brzegami. Warszawa: Państwowy Instytut Wydawniczy. 1961.
- Koniec zabawy. Warszawa: Czytelnik. 1965.
- Ciemne drzewa. Warszawa: Czytelnik. 1970.
- Cudowna melina. Biblioteka „Kultury”. Vol. 227. Paris: Instytut Literacki. 1973.
- Trzecie kłamstwo. Biblioteka „Kultury”. Vol. 312. Paris: Instytut Literacki. 1980.
- Opowiadania wojenne. Białystok: Białostocka Oficyna Wydawnicza. 1982.
- Pustynia Gobi. Warszawa: Niezależna Oficyna Wydawnicza. 1983.
- Przechowalnia. Warszawa: Wydawnictwo „Przedświt”. 1985.
- Historia "Cudownej meliny". Biblioteka „Kultury”. Vol. 429. Paris: Instytut Literacki. 1987.
- Drugie wrota w las. Warszawa: Iskry. 1992.
- Zimna Elka. Warszawa: Wydawnictwo „Morex”. 1995.
- Niebieski szklarz. Kraków: Wydawnictwo Literackie. 1996.
- Święci tańczą na łąkach. Współczesne opowiadania polskie. Lublin: Wydawnictwo Uniwersytetu im. Marii Curie Skłodowskiej. 1996.
- Drewniane mosty. Kraków: Wydawnictwo Literackie. 2001.
- "Wielbłąd" i inne opowiadania filmowe. Izabelin: Puenta. 2001.
- Dziewczyna z ganku. Kraków: Wydawnictwo Literackie. 2006.
- Letnik z mierzei. Wydawnictwo Literackie. 2008.
- Bez ciebie nie mogę żyć. Wydawnictwo Literackie. 2010.
- Dom pod Lutnią. Powieść. Kraków: Wydawnictwo Literackie. 2012.
- Historia leśnych kochanków. Kraków: Wydawnictwo Literackie. 2013.
- Dzieje dwóch rodzin. Mackiewiczów z Litwy i Orłosiów z Ukrainy. Kraków: Wydawnictwo Literackie. 2015. ISBN 978-83-08-06047-6.
- Dzieje człowieka piszącego. Kraków: Wydawnictwo Literackie. 2019. ISBN 978-83-08-06929-5.
- Rozmowy o ludziach i pisaniu. Kraków: Wydawnictwo Literackie. 2024. ISBN 978-83-08-08523-3. Co-authored with Krzysztof Lisowski.

== Distinctions and accolades ==
- Kościelski Award (1970)
- Commander's Cross of Polonia Restituta (3 May 2007)
