= TVS (Polish TV channel) =

- Country: Poland
- Broadcast area: Silesian Voivodeship; Świętokrzyskie Voivodeship; Opole Voivodeship; Łódź Voivodeship; Lesser Poland Voivodeship; Nationwide (Poland); Europe; MENA
- Headquarters: Plac Grunwaldzki 12, 40-126 Katowice

Programming
- Languages: Silesian, Polish
- Picture format: 576i (16:9 SDTV); 1080i (16:9 HDTV)
- Timeshift service: TVS +1

Ownership
- Owner: TVS Sp. z o.o.
- Sister channels: iTVS

History
- Launched: 29 March 2008; 17 years ago

Links
- Website: tvs.pl

Availability

Terrestrial
- DVB-T Silesian Voivodeship: Channel 21

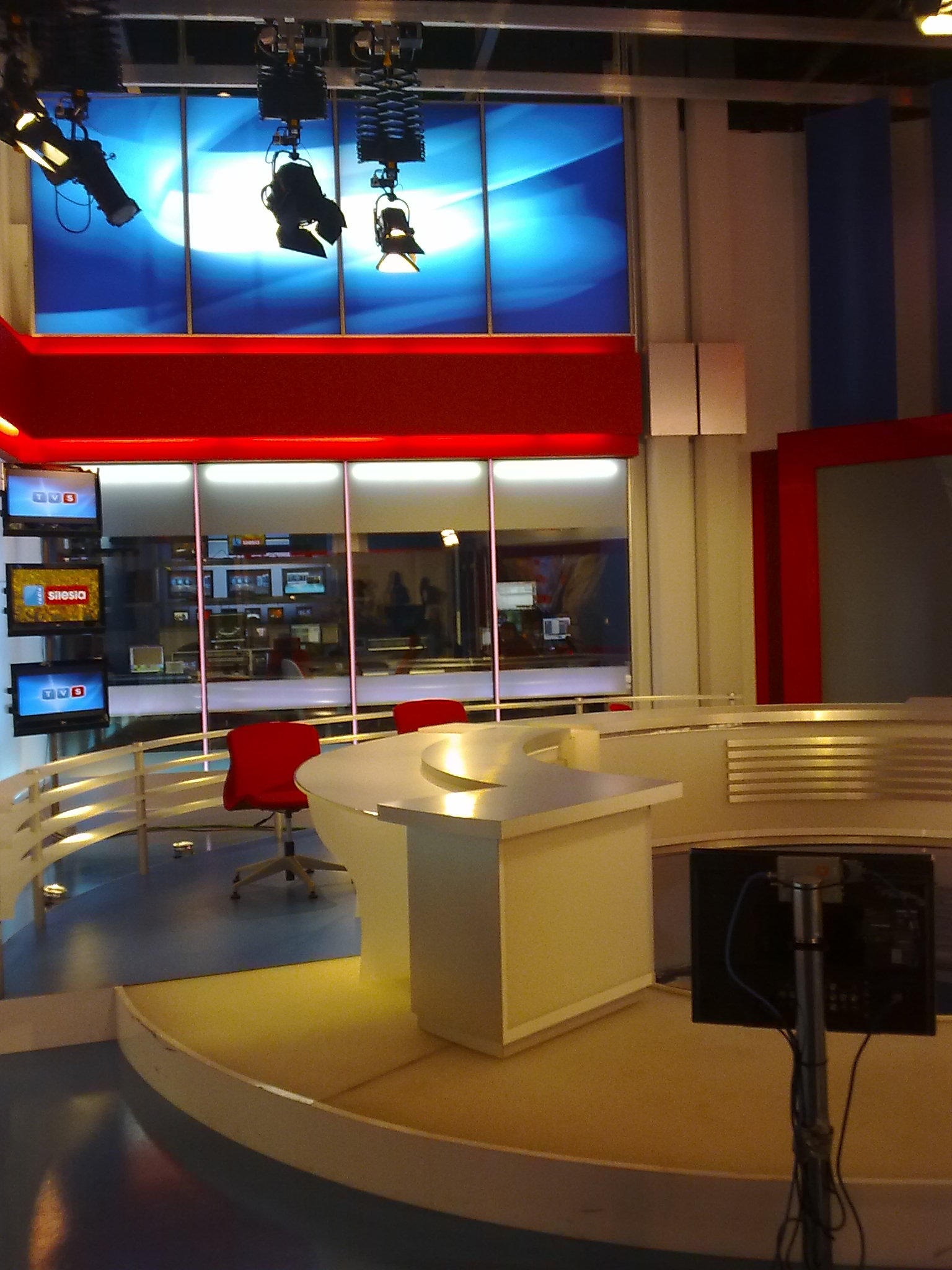
TVS studio headquarters

TVS (Television Silesia; Silesian: Telewizja Ślōnskŏ, German: Television Schlesien, Polish: Telewizja Śląska) is the first regional Silesia commercial DVB-T free-to-air television station with information and entertainment profile. The TVS television channel is directed mainly to the inhabitants of the Silesian Voivodeship, covering the historical lands of Upper Silesia and Lesser Poland (including Dąbrowa and Kraków basins). The company and its television studios are headquartered at Grunwaldzki Square in Katowice in the Metropolis GZM. TVS was created as a competitor to the public service broadcaster TVP3 Katowice. TVS started broadcasting on 29 March 2008 at 10:00 am in 16:9 format.

== History ==
=== Years 2006–2007 ===
At the end of 2006, an application was submitted to the National Broadcasting Council for a channel license.

=== Year 2008 ===
- 19 March 2008, the TVS regional channel launched a test broadcast.
- 27 March 2008, the TVS internet portal was launched. On the tvs.pl website, information from the Silesian Voivodeship was published along with photo and video news materials, including articles from various areas of life.
- First live public broadcast on 29 March 2008 at 10:00 am. TVS viewers were welcomed by television journalist and presenter Marek Czyż, accompanied by the regional Śląsk Song and Dance Ensemble. Arkadiusz Hołda, president of TV Silesia, was greeted with the traditional Polish blessing of bread and salt. During the first hours, the channel's journalists talked to invited guests, incl. Artur Rojek, Kamil Durczok, Tadeusz Sławek and Krystyna Bochenek.
- 14 April 2008 at 9:00 pm, the news magazine "Silesia informacje" (Silesia information) debuted on the air.
- 5 May 2008, TVS decided to extend the broadcasting time of the program and increase the number of news and current affairs programs.
- 5 July 2008, "Radio Silesia na wizji" (Radio Silesia in vision) debuted, the first program of this type in Poland.
- Since 4 December 2008, the station has been available to the Polish community in the US and Canada. The program was broadcast around the clock.
- During Christmas 2008, TVS aired its first entertainment films. On 31 December 2008, the station organized its first New Year's Eve party in Katowice.

=== Year 2009 ===
At the start of 2009, it was decided to broadcast TV drama, entertainment shows and movie films on a regular basis. In March 2009, Teletext was introduced. On 29 March 2009, TVS prepared the "TVS Open Day" with performances by stars from the Silesian entertainment stage.

In October 2009, Marek Czyż became the new TVS program director until 2011. Czyż replaced Sławomir Zieliński, who left the station two months earlier.

== Transmission ==
=== Profile ===
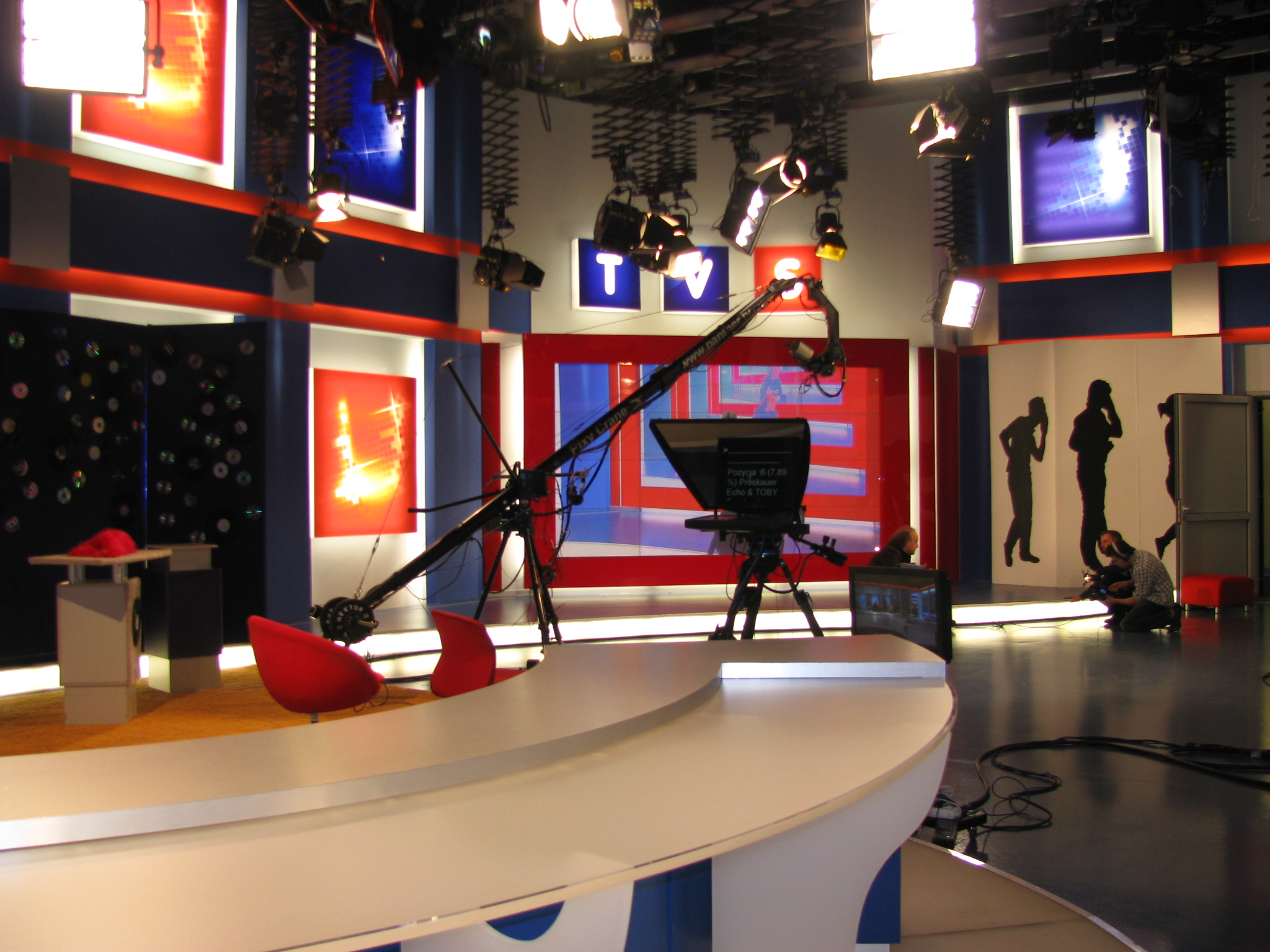
Main TVS studio, from which the information programme Silesia Flesz (Silesia Flash) is broadcast

Since the beginning of the station's existence, its programs informed mainly about events from the Silesia region. TVS also broadcasts programs promoting Silesia, its culture, history, traditions and regional Schlager music—where TVS together with Radio Silesia 96.2 FM actively engages in the promotional process of regional music artists on the Silesian music stage. The main programme subjects related to the Silesia region and the Silesian Voivodship dominate.

In addition to information, journalistic and entertainment programmes, TVS also airs iconic Polish and foreign drama programmes such as Magnum, P.I., Murder, She Wrote, Miami Vice and Kojak with soundtrack voice-over translation. Since 2011, a gradual process of expanding the nature of the television station and changing the format to include nationwide events whilst maintaining a regional character of information has begun. The station broadcasts 24 hours a day.
