= 19.30 =

2023 Polish TV series or program

- Genre: News program
- Presented by: Marek Czyż; Joanna Dunikowska-Paź; Zbigniew Łuczyński; Monika Sawka; Anna Kowalska
- Country of origin: Poland
- Original language: Polish

Production
- Production locations: 17 Jana Pawła Woronicza Street, Warsaw, Poland
- Editor: Paweł Płuska
- Running time: 30 minutes
- Production company: Telewizja Polska

Original release
- Network: TVP1; TVP3 (recording only); TVP Info; TVP Polonia; TVP Wilno
- Release: December 21, 2023 – present

Related
- 14.30 22.30

19.30 (stylized as i9.30) is the main Polish television news program produced by Telewizja Polska (TVP) and broadcast on TVP1, TVP Polonia, TVP Info (from 29 December 2023) and TVP Wilno. The main edition is transmitted daily at 7:30 p.m. It premiered on 21 December 2023, and succeeded Wiadomości, which was canceled following the management changes at TVP days before.

== History ==
=== Background ===
On 19 December 2023, the Sejm adopted a resolution on the restoration of legal order and the impartiality and reliability of public media. There were 244 MPs in favor of the resolution, 84 MPs against it, and 16 MPs abstained from voting. On the same day, the Minister of Culture and National Heritage, Bartłomiej Sienkiewicz, appointed new supervisory boards of Telewizja Polska, Polskie Radio and the Polish Press Agency. On 20 December 2023, after 11:18, the TVP Info channel stopped broadcasting, and the TVP2 channel signal was broadcast on TVP3 regional channels. TVP Info employees initially tried to broadcast live on TVP's Facebook and YouTube channels, but those were turned off.

On 20 December, at 7:30 pm, instead of the next edition of Wiadomości, TVP1 broadcast a statement from Marek Czyż:

Hello everyone. As you have certainly noticed, there have been some changes, so you have the right to expect explanations. So allow me to explain. No Polish citizen who finances the operation of public television has any obligation to listen to anyone's propaganda. Every Polish citizen who finances public media has the right to demand reliable, professional and honest information. That's why I'm offering you what I think is a fair deal. From tomorrow, Wiadomości will present you with a photograph of the world and of the day, with everything that it brings. A photograph, not a painting, because they are not the same. The painting in these studios has been painted for eight years, using only carefully selected colors. And I assure you that this is coming to an end. Instead of propaganda soup, we would like to offer you clean water. Not because it is noble, but because it does not have any intrusive flavors. And I promise you that it starts now. There will be no Wiadomości today, but tomorrow we will provide you with a news program from Telewizja Polska, as always at 7:30 pm. My name is Marek Czyż, and I cordially invite you.

— Marek Czyż, TVP1

=== Launch ===
On 21 December, as announced, the first edition of 19.30 was broadcast. On 29 December, as part of that day's TVP Info relaunch, the first edition of an additional Gość 19.30 segment was broadcast, with that day's 19.30 presenter Joanna Dunikowska-Paź interviewing Waldemar Skrzypczak; 29 December also marked the first time that 19.30 was broadcast on TVP Info proper as opposed to that channel merely showing the TVP1 broadcast.

On 9 September 2024, as part of a new schedule on TVP Info, TVP premiered a new sister afternoon bulletin known as 14.30, which is broadcast on TVP Info and TVP3 with replays on TVP Polonia.

A sister late-night bulletin on TVP Info, 22.30, was launched on 2 March 2026.

== Reception ==
The first edition was watched by over 4 million viewers, with the average viewing figure across the first six editions reaching 2.74 million. In an internal letter to TVP employees, the broadcaster's new CEO Tomasz Sygut claimed to have heard that the program was "fair but a bit boring", which he said was a "desirable" opinion since public television news programs were not meant to be a place for "fireworks, cheap emotional games [...] persecution, lies, and manipulation."

On 19 February 2024, the Demagog factchecking website published a report in which it compared 19.30 's January editions with those of TVN's Fakty and Polsat's Wydarzenia and concluded that 19.30 was biased towards the October 15 Coalition government.

== See also ==
- Panorama
- Teleexpress
- 2023 Polish public media crisis
