= Kosztowy =

- Mysłowice District
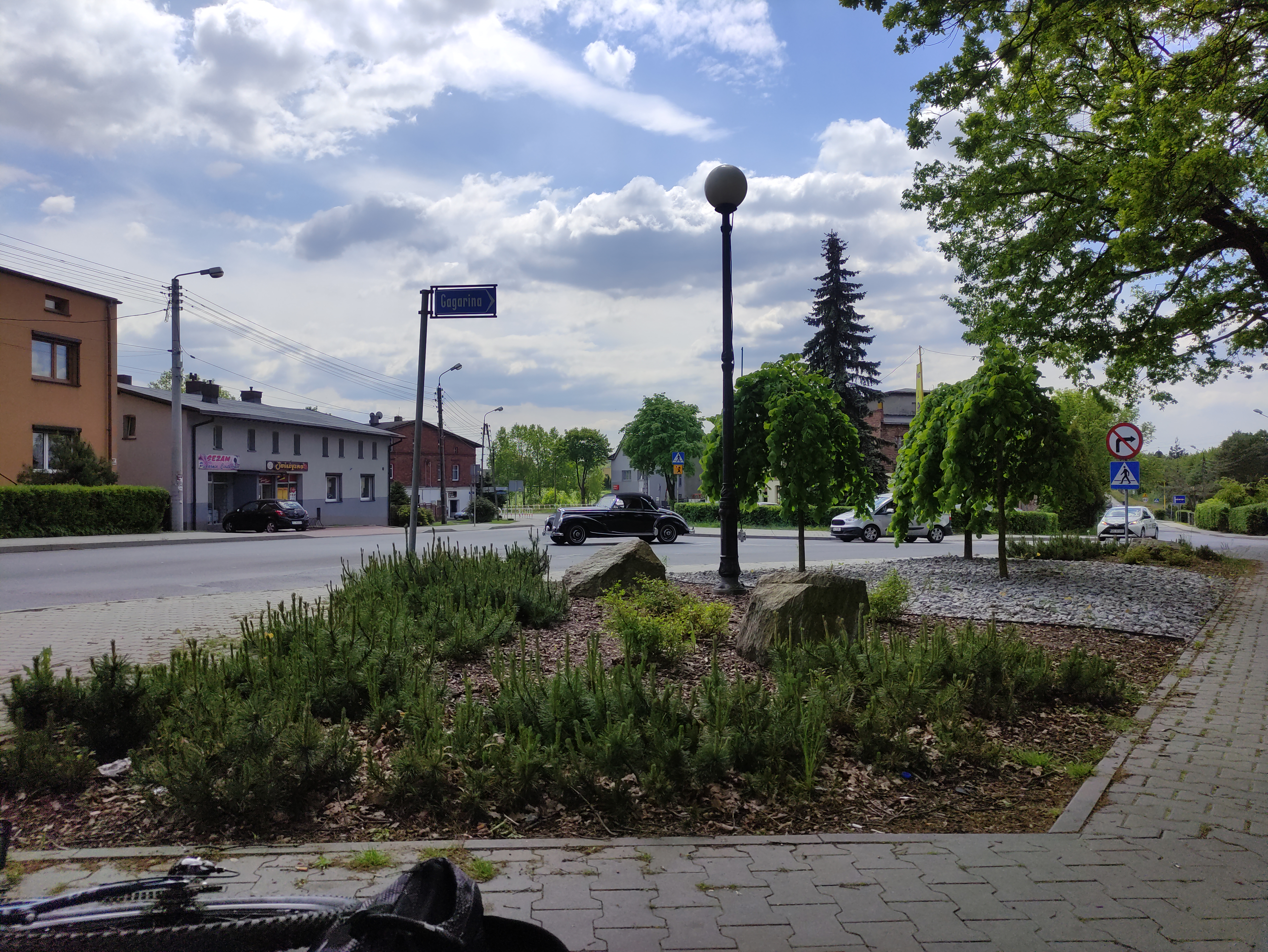

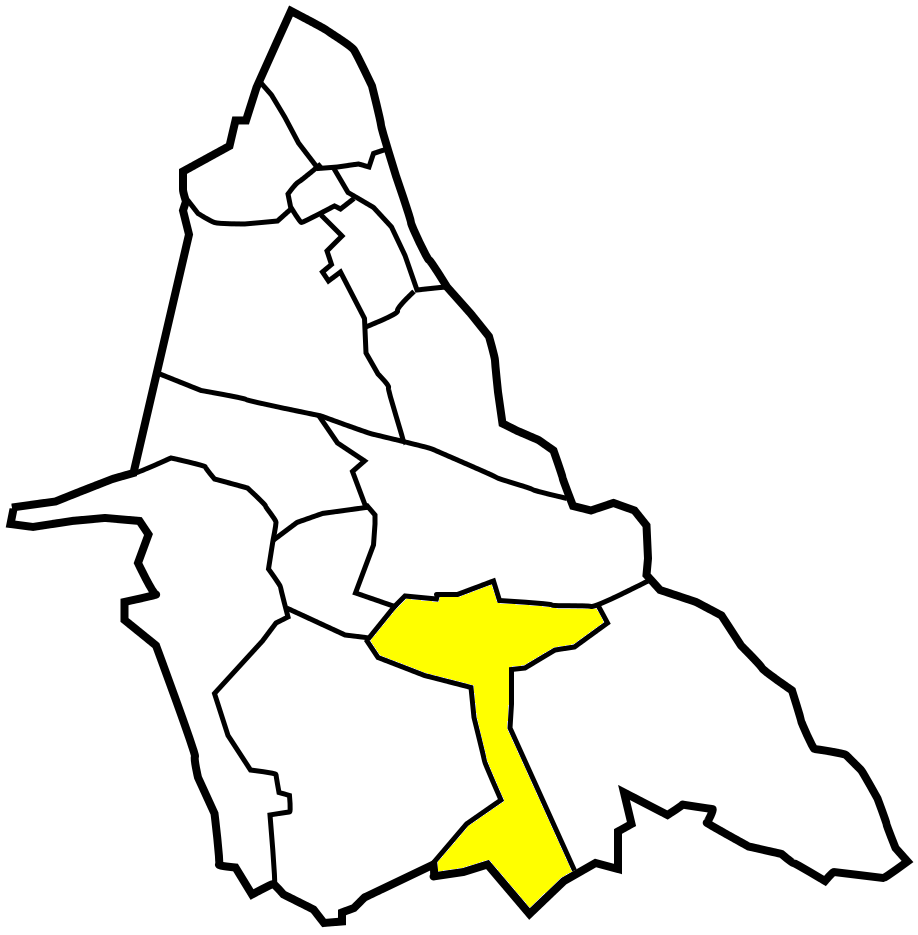
- Location of Kosztowy within Mysłowice
- Coordinates: 50°11′17″N 19°01′01″E
- Country: Poland
- Voivodeship: Silesian
- County/City: Mysłowice

Area
  - Total: 517 km^{2} (200 sq mi)

Population (2012)
  - Total: 3,480
  - Density: 6.73/km^{2} (17.4/sq mi)
- Time zone: UTC+1 (CET)
  - Summer (DST): UTC+2 (CEST)
- Area code: (+48) 032

Kosztowy (German: Kostow) is a quarter of the city of Mysłowice in the Silesian Voivodship of Poland. The formerly independent municipality is approximately 4 km south the city centre of Mysłowice, close to the neighbouring city of Imielin. In the course of a major re-organisation of municipal borders in Upper Silesia it was incorporated into Mysłowice together with Wesoła and Dziećkowice.

It has an area of 5.17 km^{2} (2.00 sq mi) and in 2012 had a population of 3,480.

== History ==
The first mentioning of Kosztowy is in an old document from the 14th century. During that time it belonged to the Duchy of Racibórz. In 1391 Duke John II gave the large forests surrounding Kosztowy, Imielin and Chełm Śląski to the Bishop of Kraków. Since the bishops were also civil administrators of their areas, Kosztowy did not become part of Silesia until 1742. In 1772 it became part of Prussia and from 1792 it belonged to the newly formed district of Imielin. In 1807 it became part of the Principality of Siewierz governed by the French marshal Jean Lannes. In 1817 it was returned to Prussia. The village had 718 inhabitants in 1885. A local branch of the Polish Sokół movement was established in 1905 to replace the Mysłowice branch after its dissolution due to harassment by local German authorities. From 1818 to 1922 it was part of the Kreis (district) of Pless until it was turned over back to Poland in 1922.

Following the German-Soviet invasion of Poland, which started World War II in September 1939, the village was occupied by Germany until 1945. A local Polish policeman was murdered by the Russians in the Katyn massacre in 1940.

== Facilities ==
Near Kosztowy there is an FM- and TV-transmission facility with a 355-metre-high (1,165 ft) guyed mast.
