= 2023 Polish public media crisis =

Takeover of Polish public media

- Logo of Telewizja Polska
- Initiator: Bartłomiej Sienkiewicz
- Target: Telewizja Polska, Polskie Radio and Polska Agencja Prasowa
- Initiated: 19 December 2023

On 19 December 2023, Bartłomiej Sienkiewicz, the Minister of Culture and National Heritage in Poland, dismissed the then-current state media directors and their supervisory boards, most notably those of public broadcaster Telewizja Polska (TVP), appointing new ones in their place. Responses to the dismissal included accusations of illegality and protests by the dismissed management and the opposition Law and Justice (PiS) party.

== Prelude ==
=== Background ===
After Law and Justice won the parliamentary election in 2015, TVP reporting began to align with the PiS government's rhetoric opposing further EU integration and types of immigration, as well as social policies, such as LGBTQ+ rights and a loosened abortion law. During its 8 year rule, TVP consistently praised the PiS government and disparaged the opposition. It was widely regarded by national and international media watchdogs to be extremely biased and highly selective. In the lead-up to the 2023 election, The Guardian described TVP as a propaganda arm of PiS, while the Polish opposition referred to it as a factory of hate. The reform and depoliticization of the state media became a campaign promise of the main opposition alliance, the Civic Coalition, which included it in its list of "100 concrete promises for the first 100 days of government."

=== Preparation ===
After winning the 2023 parliamentary election, the 15 October Coalition, consisting of the Civic Coalition, Poland 2050, Polish People's Party and The Left, included plans to reform state media in their coalition agreement.

On 14 December, citing journalistic freedom and independence, a protest of the Warsaw club of Gazeta Polska "in defense of free media" was held in front of one of the TVP buildings, attended by employees of the state-owned station, as well as Law and Justice politicians.

On the same day, at the request of a group of Law and Justice deputies, the Constitutional Tribunal banned the possibility of removals and changes to the TVP and Polish Radio board of directors until the hearing scheduled for 16 January 2024. This ban, however, was deemed as non-binding by some lawyers and the Ministry of Culture and National Heritage itself.

On 19 December 2023, the Sejm passed a resolution on "restoring the legal order and the impartiality and integrity of the public media and the Polish Press Agency" with 244 votes in favor. There were 84 votes against and 16 abstentions. More than 100 Law and Justice deputies did not participate in the vote, having instead gone to the TVP headquarters to protest the change.

On the same day, Bartłomiej Sienkiewicz dismissed the authorities of public media, including TVP. Newly appointed TVP supervisory board would then designate Tomasz Sygut to be TVP's new CEO.

== Takeover ==
=== Headquarters takeover ===
==== Telewizja Polska (TVP) ====
On 20 December, Piotr Zemła, the newly appointed head of TVP's supervisory board, arrived at the television headquarters on Woronicza Street. He was met by Law and Justice MPs and TVP employees occupying the building, who questioned his authority and the legality of the decision to change the station's authorities. Due to the turmoil at the building, Joanna Borowiak, a Law and Justice MP, was hospitalized. Jacek Sasin blamed the incident on "a person accompanying the new director," while Szymon Hołownia, serving as the Marshal of the Sejm, indicated that it may have been done by a security employee.

It was decided by Sygut that TVP Info should go off air. This was carried out at 11:18:31 a.m. CET, with both the terrestrial broadcast and the online stream being suddenly switched to TVP1's broadcast at first and then going on to alternate between TVP1's programming, TVP Polonia's programming, and repeats of Ranczo. TVP3, TVP World, and TVP Parlament also went off air, with TVP3's national programming being switched to that of TVP2 (internal broadcasting of TVP3's regional outputs would continue unabated however) and programming for TVP World being changed to that of TVP Polonia, while TVP Parlament's programming was not switched to that of any other TVP channel and so that particular channel was effectively taken off air completely. People attempting to visit the official websites for TVP Info, TVP3, TVP World, or TVP Parlament were instead redirected to the main TVP website. News programs that would normally air on TVP1 (Teleexpress, Wiadomości) and TVP2 (Panorama) were instead replaced by fillers featuring each channel's respective logos.

At 12:17 p.m., Adrian Borecki, a Wiadomości journalist, interrupted the broadcast of the Agrobiznes program on TVP1 to inform that channel's viewers of the situation. He announced that a special edition of Wiadomości would continue to air on TVP1 from that point until "the very end." Half a minute later, the broadcast was interrupted and replaced by a standby sequence of the TVP1 logo.

Sometime after 2 p.m., Samuel Pereira, the head of TVP Info, began a live stream on its YouTube channel. The stream featured the TVP Info broadcast, recorded with a phone camera, that would have been airing if the channel had not gone off the air. The stream was taken down in less than half an hour.

A group of IT specialists from TVP secured the new management's access to most of broadcaster's social media, removing the role of administrator from its key representatives. TVP Info's X (formerly Twitter) account, managed personally by Samuel Pereira, remained under the control of the old management despite changes in other social media accounts.

At 7:30 p.m., instead of the usual Wiadomości program, a short announcement was broadcast on TVP1 (and, by extension, TVP Info) in which presenter Marek Czyż announced that what he declared to be "unbiased news" would be returning and that the next day's broadcast of Wiadomości would go ahead as normal. At the same time, former TVP presenters appeared in a special edition of Wiadomości which, while using the program's usual studio, was broadcast on Telewizja Republika.

In the evening, TVP began sending dismissal emails to some of its employees.

On 21 December, a new program was announced to replace Wiadomości, set to be broadcast during the same 7:30 p.m. timeslot as its predecessor. The new program's name was kept a closely guarded secret until the first broadcast, whereupon it was revealed to be 19.30. The program's intro and theme music had already been prepared before the takeover. Teleexpress and Panorama remained off air on 21 December and reportedly were to remain so until TVP's post-takeover operations were fully stabilized.

=== Response ===
Protests in and around TVP buildings by TVP staff, sympathetic politicians, and members of the public continued after 20 December. Since those taking place on 24 December coincided with Wigilia celebrations, that day saw protesters exchanging Christmas wafers among themselves in the traditional manner and the occupied Television Information Agency building at Warsaw Insurgents Square being visited by a priest. The occupation of the Television Information Agency building by pre-takeover individuals meant that post-takeover news programming had to be filmed in studios at the main TVP building on Woronicza Street, with that building's lower technical capabilities meaning that associated facilities and efforts effectively had to be created from scratch.

On 24 December, Mateusz Matyszkowicz, the CEO of TVP prior to the takeover, resigned from his position and the pre-takeover supervisory board appointed Maciej Łopiński as his successor. Piotr Zemła, the newly appointed head, stated the supervisory board did not appoint Łopiński, clarifying that Tomasz Sygut remained the only current CEO of TVP.

On 25 December, National Broadcasting Council president Maciej Świrski drew attention to what he described as the "destruction" of TVP's archives, with the takedown of the TVP Info website, the removal of the Reset and Resortowe dzieci documentaries as well as various films and concerts pertaining to folk culture from TVP VOD, and the removal of recorded Jacek Kowalski concerts from TVP3 Poznań being enumerated by Świrski as specific examples of this behavior. Świrski urged the authors of any removed material to contact the National Broadcasting Council.

On 26 December, TVP3 returned to the air at 10:00 a.m. It did not include the regional programming that was the primary focus of the station, despite said programming continuing to be produced as normal. During the night, the National Media Council appointed Wiadomości anchor and former Television Information Agency president Michał Adamczyk as the CEO of TVP despite the role having already been given to Tomasz Sygut during the initial takeover. The previously appointed Łopiński was not dismissed either. Adamczyk issued a statement in which he characterized the actions of the new government as being "illegal" and causing "huge damage," and promised to "restore legal and corporate order in [TVP] as soon as possible, punish those responsible for breaking the law, and resume the operation of all broadcasters." At the time of Adamczyk being appointed, he and other individuals were continuing their occupation of the Television Information Agency building.

As of 27 December, TVP's new management did not foresee having to make any penalty or compensation payments in relation to commercial breaks being disrupted to various degrees, up to and including not being aired at all, during the takeover. On the same day, Bartłomiej Sienkiewicz put TVP, Polish Radio, and the Polish Press Agency into liquidation, citing president Andrzej Duda's decision to stop funding public media as the reason. Sienkiewicz claimed his actions would ensure that the companies would continue operations, necessary restructuring could be carried out, and employees could avoid layoffs. The liquidation also had the effect of annulling the various attempts to appoint alternative CEOs for TVP. Samuel Pereira claimed the liquidation was actually an attempt to bypass the National Court Register should it not validate the takeover, while president Duda's chief of staff Marcin Mastalerek published a statement which described the liquidation as "an admission of defeat by the government" and "proof of the complete powerlessness of the authorities who have not found any legal way to change the leadership of these companies." 27 December also saw a formal announcement by TVP World that its operations had been suspended until mid-January. Shortly afterward, its director Filip Styczyński stated that he had been relieved of his duties.

On 28 December, multiple outlets reported that TVP Info's broadcasting was to be resumed on 29 December. Grzegorz Sajór confirmed that transmissions would resume at 7:30 p.m. CET.

Under new editor Danuta Dobrzyńska, Telewizja Polska announced that the program Teleexpress would resume on 4 January 2024, and would be broadcast from the Woronicza 17 (also TVP Sport and 19.30) studio. After a break of 7 years, the presenter Maciej Orłoś was back for host and the new face Aleksandra Kostrzewska, from channel TVP Info also joined Teleexpress.

Under new editor and host Jarosław Kulczycki, Telewizja Polska announced that news programme Panorama, would return on 10 January 2024, and would be broadcast from the Woronicza 17 (also TVP Sport, 19.30 and Teleexpress) studio and also new time of that programme at 22:30 CET.

On 9 January 2024, the 13th Commercial Division of the National Court Register dismissed the application to enter the new members of TVP's supervisory board and Tomasz Sygut's presidency of TVP into the National Court Register on the basis that, contrary to the arguments of the new government that the culture minister was empowered to make management changes due to his representing the state treasury (i.e. the sole shareholder of Polish public media), the relevant competencies had not been assumed by the minister and so he could not use commercial law to unilaterally appoint management members. The court also stated that it was the National Media Council that continued to be responsible for managerial appointments. When the decision was publicly reported the next day, the Ministry of Culture and National Heritage insisted that the new management's activities were fully legal and that Sienkiewicz's appointments remained valid, but did not indicate whether it would appeal the court's decision. It did, however, note that the decision did not apply to the 27 December liquidation of public media companies as it happened after the takeover. Meanwhile, Michał Adamczyk, who continued to claim he was the current CEO of TVP, said the decision demonstrated the illegality of the takeover of TVP and invalidated all decisions made by Sygut, including new contracts made with journalists. Andrzej Duda, the president of Poland, made a similar statement about the decision confirming the takeover to have been an "absolutely blatant violation of the constitution and the law."

On 13 January 2024, Michał Adamczyk and his deputies Marcin Tulicki and Samuel Pereira left the Television Information Agency building after almost a month of occupation. Adamczyk considered the decisions of the Warsaw district court, which refused to enter the authorities of Telewizja Polska and Polish Radio established by the decision of the Minister of Culture of 19 December into the National Court Register as a success in the conflict. Daniel Gorgosz, TVP's liquidator, announced that the building would remain closed until further notice, claiming the decision was dictated primarily by the need to ensure the safety of TVP employees and the necessary protection of the company's property, including its critical infrastructure. He informed parliamentarians that parliamentary interventions could be carried out at TVP's headquarters, where "appropriate rooms were prepared where the MP's powers can be exercised." On 18 January, it was reported that Adamczyk, Tulicki, and Pereira had been fired for what TVP's information center called "irregularities and acting to the detriment of the company."

Just before noon on 15 January 2024, the TVP Info website and YouTube channel were restored; access to archived material was also restored where said material was not biased towards the previous Law and Justice government. Andrzej Jaszczyszyn was named as the head of the restored tvp.info service. On 22 January 2024, TVP Info regained effective control of its X account; the account had previously continued to be under the control of Samuel Pereira and other pre-takeover individuals until at least 11 January.

On 18 January 2024, Poland's Constitutional Tribunal ruled that a provision of the media law allowing the commercial code to be applied to state broadcasters could not be used to dissolve or liquidate them and attempts to use the commercial code to dismiss their managerial boards were without legal effect. One judge, Jarosław Wyrembak, added that liquidation of public media outlets required legislative measures and that dismissal of the management boards of state broadcasters was the exclusive competence of the National Media Council. Culture minister Bartłomiej Sienkiewicz responded by declaring the Tribunal's verdict to itself have no legal significance due to judgments by Polish and European courts which found that changes made to the Tribunal under the Law and Justice government meant that it no longer constituted a legitimate judicial body and due to individual judges involved with the ruling either being illegally or otherwise incorrectly appointed (Wyrembak and the Tribunal's chief justice Julia Przyłębska) or having a conflict of interest due to having previously been involved with changes to the media law at the heart of the ruling (Krystyna Pawłowicz and Stanisław Piotrowicz).

On 22 January 2024, an attempt to enter the liquidation of Polskie Radio into the National Court Register was also met with judicial refusal, with the court saying that the "unprecedented" nature of events required "broader considerations and a thorough analysis of the provisions of specific laws, case law and doctrine". Sienkiewicz responded by saying that entry (or lack thereof) into the National Court Register was only of "declaratory" and "informational" value and did not establish any given body's status or rights, and announced that Polskie Radio's liquidator was likely to immediately file a complaint against the decision which would deprive it of legal force until the complaint had been examined by the court, with this being followed by a further right of appeal. In Sienkiewicz's opinion, "[o]nly a final judgement by a commercial court invaliding the resolution could effectively question the legality of the process"; he also noted that a number of decisions to put local branches of Polskie Radio into liquidation had been successfully entered into the National Court Register, with one of these entries involving the same court that had passed the 22 January verdict. The decision was welcomed by Mariusz Błaszczak, the head of Law and Justice's parliamentary caucus, who said that the liquidator appointed to run Polskie Radio no longer had any basis to do so.

On 24 January 2024, the 20th Commercial Division of the District Court in Warsaw dismissed Michał Adamczyk's application for security, questioning the resolutions of the General Meeting of Shareholders of Telewizja Polska (currently in liquidation) dismissing the previous and appointing new authorities of the company.

On 26 January 2024, a notary who drew up documents that were used to change the management of public media bodies was charged with knowingly certifying false information since, in the view of prosecutors, the documents could not have been produced at the time and place that was indicated. The notary in question was abroad at the time of being charged and thus was not immediately informed of the charges. Doubts about the propriety of the documents were first raised by Marcin Dobski of Salon24.pl who claimed that, since the Sejm resolution regarding public media was passed at 10:13pm on 19 December 2023, and since Bartłomiej Sienkiewicz had finished changing the management of TVP, Polskie Radio, and the Polish Press Agency by midnight, it would have taken him 107 minutes to carry out the changes and then confirm them in notarised documents, with Dobski deeming it "impossible" for those documents to have been legitimately prepared within this timescale.

On 29 January 2024, the decision to put the Polish Press Agency into liquidation was accepted for entry into the National Court Register; the decision was in stark contrast to the same court's refusal to register the liquidation of TVP and Polskie Radio.

As of 2 February 2024, Watchdog Polska and the Helsinki Foundation for Human Rights' Polish branch (Helsińska Fundacja Praw Człowieka, HFPC) had requested the Ministry of Culture and National Heritage for copies of the legal opinions; the requests were denied because the Ministry claimed not to have saved such copies. HFPC criticized the Ministry's response and said it would take the issue to court. Bartłomiej Sienkiewicz would later publish a post on X with a link to a page on TVP's website containing two legal opinions supporting his actions, but both opinions had been issued after the takeover.

On 5 February 2024, the return of TVP World was unofficially described by Wirtualne Media as being imminent, with the station's schedule being worked on. Jerzy Kamiński was described as having replaced the recently relieved Filip Styczyński as director. On 8 February 2024, it became known that channel programs will be shown from Television Information Agency. Unofficially, it is known that TVP World may return around 26 February 2024. On 29 February 2024, it was announced that Michał Broniatowski would become the new director of TVP World from March.

On 13 February 2024, the District Court for the capital city of Warsaw dismissed the Ministry of Culture and National Heritage's complaint regarding the court clerk's refusal to enter the members of the supervisory board and the president of TVP in the National Court Register. While a similar decision was made on the same day regarding Polskie Radio, the next day (14 February) the Ministry announced that all seventeen radio stations owned by the Polish state had been effectively entered into the National Court Register as undergoing liquidation after the regional court in Lublin ruled in favor of the Ministry and decided to put the last regional division of Polskie Radio into liquidation.

In March 2024, the Belsat management board was informed about the cut in financing from 74 million PLN in 2023 to 40 million PLN in 2024, which, according to Agnieszka Romaszewska, de facto meant the liquidation of the channel and the need to dismiss the team. A few days later, Romaszewska, the founder and director of Belsat, was dismissed from her position and her job at TVP.

On 8 April 2024, the decision to put TVP into liquidation was finally accepted for entry into the National Court Register.

On 16 December 2024, the District Court in Warsaw dismissed Michał Adamczyk's lawsuit against Telewizja Polska in its entirety. It concerns resolutions from December 2023 regarding changes in the company's management.

== Reactions ==
Members of the Law and Justice party claimed that the takeover had been done illegally. A similar standpoint was taken by the Law and Justice-controlled National Media Council, who described the takeover as "an attack on public media." HFPC described the takeover as raising serious legal and constitutional doubts in the light of previous case law by the Constitutional Tribunal, while nevertheless emphasizing the Law and Justice party's rampant politicization of Polish public media.

The government claims that the takeover was possible as a result of a legislative loophole, where the Minister of Culture was able to apply the Commercial Companies Code directly.

The president Andrzej Duda called on the Council of Ministers to respect the legal order, and would later refer to the situation around the takeover when announcing his intention to veto the new government's budget related bill (which included 3 billion PLN for public media) on 23 December. Prime Minister Donald Tusk responded by claiming that the measures were intended to restore legal order and decency in public life, in line with the president's intentions.

== See also ==
- Closure of ERT
- Czech TV crisis
- Lex TVN
