= Teleexpress =

- Program's logo used since 2011
- Genre: News programme
- Created by: Józef Węgrzyn
- Presented by: Maciej Orłoś; Aleksandra Kostrzewska; Bartosz Cebeńko
- Theme music composer: Michał Lorenc (2011–present); Karim Martusewicz (2008–2011)
- Country of origin: Poland
- Original language: Polish

Production
- Producer: TVP
- Editor: Danuta Dobrzyńska-Schimmer
- Running time: 15 minutes

Original release
- Network: TVP1; TVP Info; TVP Polonia
- Release: 26 June 1986

Related
- Teleexpress Extra

Teleexpress is the second news program of the TVP, broadcast daily on TVP1 and on TVP Info at 17:00 / 5:00PM. Until June 1992, it was broadcast at 17:15 / 5:15PM.

It may broadcasts at different hours on TVP1 if the schedule of some sporting events that the channel broadcast interfere with the usual airtime.

On December 20, 2023, for the first time in history, the program was not broadcast. From that day to 3 January 2024 the program was suspended due to 2023 takeover of TVP. Under new editor Danuta Dobrzyńska, they announced that the program would resume on 4 January 2024, and would be broadcast from the Woronicza studio. After a break of 7 years, the presenter Maciej Orłoś was back for host that program and the new face Aleksandra Kostrzewska, from channel TVP Info also joined Teleexpress.

== Presenters ==
=== Currently ===
- Maciej Orłoś (1991-2016, since 2024)
- Aleksandra Kostrzewska (since 2024)
- Bartosz Cebeńko (since 2024)

=== In the past ===
Wojciech Mazurkiewicz, Wojciech Reszczyński, Wojciech Nowakowski, Zbigniew Krajewski, Marek Sierocki, Sławomir Zieliński, Piotr Radziszewski, Kuba Strzyczkowski, Maciej Gudowski, Jarosław Kret, Jan Suzin (only one broadcast on 25 October 2002), Piotr Gembarowski, Tomasz Kammel, Michał Adamczyk, Sławomir Komorowski, Bożena Targosz, Jolanta Fajkowska, Magdalena Olszewska, Kinga Rusin, Hanna Smoktunowicz, Adriana Niecko, Urszula Boruch, Małgorzata Wyszyńska, Patrycja Hryniewicz-Nowak, Beata Gwoździewicz, Paweł Bukrewicz, Danuta Dobrzyńska, Katarzyna Trzaskalska, Agata Biały-Cholewińska, Michał Cholewiński, Rafał Patyra, Beata Chmielowska-Olech, Marta Piasecka, Krzysztof Ziemiec.

== Additional Programs ==
Teleexpress Junior was broadcast from September 1, 1998, to June 2000 as a youth news program. Aired daily from Monday to Friday - initially at 2:30 pm, from October 12, 1998, at 3:30 pm, and from September 1999 at 4:15 pm (except Tuesdays - at 4:30 pm).

Teleexpress nocą was the evening edition of the Teleexpress news program broadcast from July 2 to October 31, 2007, between 10:50 pm and 2:00 am on TVP1. The program was broadcast from Monday to Thursday. Teleexpress nocą was more entertaining than informative, which made it even more different from the main issue of Teleexpress, which often supplements the news with funny comments. At the end of each release, a music video for the song "of goodnight" was broadcast. The program was taken off the air due to low viewership. The first edition of Teleexpress nocą, broadcast on July 2, 2007, was hosted by Radosław Brzózka.

Teleexpress Extra has been broadcasting from March 2, 2014, an information program that supplements the main issue of Teleexpress, which is broadcast daily on TVP Info at 17:15.

Teleexpress na deser was broadcast from 2018, to December 17, 2023 as a weekend TV program broadcast on TVP Info. The program deals with the issues of cuisine, fashion, music, etc. The show was cancelled due to 2023 Polish public media crisis.

== See also ==
- 19.30
- Panorama
- TVP Info
