= Panorama (Polish TV program) =

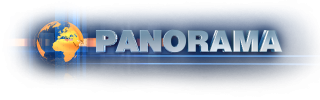
- Program logo used from 2023.
- Genre: news
- Theme music composer: Michał Lorenc (2005–2008, 2009–present); Piotr Majchrzak (2008–2009)
- Country of origin: Poland
- Original language: Polish

Production
- Producer: TVP
- Editor: Ewa Strzelec
- Running time: 20 minutes (18:00); 25 minutes (21:45)

Original release
- Network: TVP Info; TVP3 (recording only); TVP Polonia (recording only)
- Release: 30 March 1987 – 1991 - as Panorama Dnia. 1991 - present – as Panorama.

Panorama is the main late night news program on TVP Info. The main edition is broadcast at 21:45 every day and side edition is broadcast at 18:00. The program was created in 1987 as Panorama Dnia, during Poland's communist rule. In 1991, Panorama Dnia was changed into Panorama. In 2010, Panorama was watched by an average of 1.5 million Poles. Previously was broadcasting in TVP2 from 1987 to 1 September 2024.

In December 2020, the 18:00 main edition was shortened from 25 minutes to 20 minutes to accommodate Jeopardy!, which airs at 18:20. In September 2022, with Jeopardy! airing seven days a week, the 18:00 main edition on weekends was reduced also to 20 minutes.

On 20 December 2023, for the first time in history, the program was not broadcast and remained suspended until 9 January 2024 due to the 2023 Polish public media crisis. Under the new editor and host Jarosław Kulczycki, Panorama announced it would return on 10 January 2024 and would be broadcast from the Woronicza 17 (also 19.30 and Teleexpress) studio. In addition to this, it would adopt new broadcasting slots, these being Monday to Wednesday at 22:35 CET, as well as Thursday and Friday at 22:55 CET, but later changed to 22:30 CET. It was reported that the previous Panorama team would be staying on.

At the end of July 2024, Telewizja Polska S.A. announced that from September of the same year the program would disappear from the TVP2 schedule and would be broadcast exclusively on TVP Info, in a 15-minute longer formula, expanded to include, among other things, economic information and a larger amount of field materials. On 30 August 2024, information was provided about the addition of a side edition of Panorama at 6:00 p.m. lasting 15 minutes from 9 September 2024.

== Current presenters ==
=== Main editions ===
- Piotr Jędrzejek (since 2024)
- Justyna Śliwowska-Mróz (since 2024)
- Ewa Gajewska (since 2024)
- Marcin Kowalski (since 2024)

== Editions ==
17:35 - flash release
18:00 - main release
21:45 - late release
23:00 - Panorama Dnia (Monday to Thursday and Fridays at 23:15)

== Old Editions ==
7:00 a.m. - Monday to Saturday (September 5, 1994 to June 21, 1997)

7:30 a.m. - Monday to Saturday (September 2, 1991 to August 29, 1992 and June 28, 1993 to September 3, 1994)

8:00 a.m. - Monday to Saturday (August 31, 1992 to June 26, 1993) 11:00 - Monday to Friday (April 5, 1993 to April 29, 1994)

1:00 p.m. - from Monday to Friday, in the 90s expanded with the Panorama gospodarki (from April 5, 1993 to December 30, 2005)

4:00 p.m. - Monday to Friday (June 28, 1993 to April 6, 2007), in the 21st century with sign language; reprint as Panorama świat (January 4, 2011 to June 10, 2011); transformation into Panorama Kraj (from June 13, 2011 to February 28, 2017), periodic shifts to earlier hours: 3:30 p.m. - from March 3, 2014 to June 27, 2014, 3:40 p.m. - November 9, 2015 to February 28, 2017, 3:45 p.m. - from September 6, 2011 to December 30, 2011 and from September 3, 2012 to February 28, 2014, 3:50 p.m. - from August 31, 2015 to November 6, 2015

4:30 p.m. - everyday (from September 2, 1991 to June 27, 1993)

6:00 p.m. - everyday (from June 28, 1993 to September 5, 1999)

6:30 p.m. - daily (April 5, 1993 to June 25, 1993, September 6, 1999 to January 1, 2007, September 3, 2007 to June 21, 2009)

6:45 p.m. - everyday (from January 2, 2007 to September 2, 2007)

9:00 p.m. - daily (from September 2, 1991 to June 22, 1997, from September 6, 1999 to June 24, 2001, from September 3, 2001 to May 29, 2002)

9:30 p.m. - everyday (from September 3, 2007 to December 31, 2007)

10:00 p.m. - daily (from June 23, 1997 to September 5, 1999, from June 25, 2001 to September 2, 2001, from May 30, 2002 to September 2, 2006, from January 1, 2007 to September 2, 2007, from September 2 to September 8, 2024)

10:30 p.m. - everyday (from September 3, 2006 to December 31, 2006)

10:45 p.m. - daily (from June 22, 2009 to February 28, 2010)

12:00 a.m. - daily (September 2, 1991 to June 22, 1997, March 2, 2008 to August 31, 2008)

12:30 a.m. - daily (from September 1, 2008 to March 1, 2009)

10:30 p.m.–12:30 a.m. - daily (from January 1, 2008 to March 1, 2008)

6:00 p.m. - daily (from March 1, 2010 to December 19, 2023)

10:30 p.m. - weekdays (from January 10, 2024 to August 30, 2024)

10:10 p.m. - weekend (from January 13, 2024 to August 31, 2024)

== See also ==
- 19.30
- Teleexpress
- TVP Info
