= TVP1 =

Polish public television channel operated since 1952

- Logo used since March 2003
- Country: Poland
- Broadcast area: National
- Headquarters: Warsaw, Szczecin

Programming
- Language: Polish
- Picture format: 1080i HDTV (downscaled to 16:9 576i for the SDTV feed)

Ownership
- Owner: Telewizja Polska
- Sister channels: TVP2; TVP3; TVP HD

History
- Launched: 25 October 1952; 74 years ago
- Former names: TVP (1952–1970); TP1 (1976–1992)

Links
- Website: tvp1.tvp.pl

Availability

Terrestrial
- Digital terrestrial television: Channel 1 (HD)

TVP1 (TVP Jeden, Telewizja Polska 1, Program Pierwszy Telewizji Polskiej, "Jedynka") is the main public television channel of TVP (Telewizja Polska S.A.), Poland's national free-to-air television broadcaster. It was the first Polish channel to be broadcast and remains one of the most popular today. TVP1 was launched 25 October 1952.

== History ==
TVP1 was launched as of 25 October 1952 as TVP. The tests resumed in the immediate post-war years and materialized in October 1952 with the launch of the first experimental broadcasts of Polish television. In January 1953, it broadcasts at the rate of half an hour per week, then an hour and a half in March. The schedule of programmes continued to grow and the broadcast time increased to 22 hours per week in 1957, 26 hours in 1958.

Regional studios were added to those in Szczecin and Warsaw in 1956. These were first those of Łódź, Katowice (1957), Poznań (1958) and Gdańsk (1960). Some emblematic programs were born at the end of the 1950s, such as "Telewizyjny Kurier Warszawski" (Warsaw TV News) or the cultural magazine "Pegaz".

By the early 1970s, some American and British TV series (especially British productions) were popular on this channel, to such an extent that the TVP news editor watched Randall and Hopkirk Deceased and The Forsyte Saga; the latter of which was extremely popular.

TP1 became TVP1 in March 1992. On 31 August, the first breakfast television programme premiered, Kawa czy herbata? (Coffee or Tea?), which would be on the air until 2013.

On March 7, 2003, TVP1 introduced its current logo, adapted from the 1992 channel logo and put in a blue rectangle.

An HD feed was launched in January 2011 as a test broadcast. On 1 June 2012, TVP1 HD was officially launched, in anticipation for its coverage of the UEFA Euro 2012, which was held in Poland and Ukraine. On 30 August 2013, TVP1 stopped airing Wieczorynka before the evening news, because the average age of a viewer was that of a pensioner. In its place, TVP launched TVP ABC the following year, to serve that function.

== Current line-up ==
=== News show ===
- 19.30 - main news at 19:30 CET.
- Teleexpress - runs at 17:00 CET.
- Serwis Info - weekdays at 8:00, 12:00 and 15:00 CET from TVP Info.

=== Talk show/Reporters ===
- Sprawa dla reportera (The case for a reporter) - intervention program hosted by Elżbieta Jaworowicz
- Magazyn Ekspresu Reporterów - weekly reporter program hosted by Michał Olszański
- Reporterzy - reporters' magazine

=== Polish series ===
Series	Type	First Aired	No. of series	No. of episodes
Klan (Clan)	Soap Opera	Autumn 1997	27	4400
Ojciec Mateusz (Father Matthew)	Drama, Crime Series	Autumn 2008	31	407
Komisarz Alex (Inspector Alex)	Drama, Crime Series	Spring 2012	21	255
Korona królów (The Crown of the Kings)	Historical Fiction, Drama Series	Winter 2018	5	650
Leśniczówka (Forester)	Drama Series	Spring 2018	9	800
Będziemy mieszkać razem (We will live Together)	Drama Series	Spring 2024	1	6
Matylda (Matilda)	Historical Fiction, Drama Series	Spring 2024	1	13

=== Foreign series ===
- Muhteşem Yüzyıl: Kösem (Magnificent Century: Kösem) - in Polish "Wspaniałe stulecie: Sułtanka Kösem"
- A.D. The Bible Continues - in Polish "Anno Domini - Biblii ciąg dalszy"
- Homeland
- The Walking Dead - in Polish "Żywe trupy"
- Downton Abbey
- La dama velata (The veiled lady) - in Polish "Dama w czarnym welonie"
- Transporter: The Series
- The Pillars of the Earth - in Polish "Filary Ziemi"
- Chicago Fire
- Revenge - in Polish "Zemsta"
- The Tudors - in Polish "Dynastia Tudorów"
- FlashForward - in Polish "Przebłysk jutra"
- Body of Proof - in Polish "Anatomia prawdy"
- Lost - in Polish "Zagubieni"
- Dirty Sexy Money - in Polish "Seks, Kasa i Kłopoty"
- Legend of the Seeker - in Polish "Miecz Prawdy"
- Brothers & Sisters - in Polish "Bracia i siostry"
- Psych - in Polish "Świry"
- Glee
- Rome - in Polish "Rzym"
- Moonlight - in Polish "Pod Osłoną Nocy"
- Six Degrees - in Polish "Sześć Stóp Oddalenia"
- Star Wars: The Clone Wars (2008 TV series) - in Polish "Gwiezdne wojny - Wojny klonów"
- Kyle XY
- Hannah Montana
- Dragon Hunters - in Polish "Łowcy smoków"
- Elif

=== Entertainment ===
- Jaka to melodia? - the Polish version of Name That Tune
- Rolnik szuka żony - the Polish version of Farmer Wants a Wife
- Wielki Test - a TV show starring famous people and other participants, who are quizzed about history, science, and other topics (each program has a different theme).
- The Wall. Wygraj marzenia - the Polish version of The Wall
- Rodzina wie lepiej - the Polish version of Israeli game show Sure or Insure
- Hit, Hit, Hurra - music talent show for kids
- Firmowe ewolucje - economics show about the small and medium-sized enterprises, in cooperation with Bank Zachodni WBK
- National Festival of Polish Song in Opole
- Eurovision Song Contest
- Junior Eurovision Song Contest

=== Sports ===
- UEFA Champions League (one match on Wednesdays, highlights and final)
- 2024 Olympic Games
- 2022 FIFA World Cup
- UEFA Euro 2024
- UEFA Nations League
- the Poland national football team's matches
- LOTTO Ekstraklasa
- FIS Ski Jumping World Cup
- Tour de Pologne
- World Athletics Championships
- European Athletics Championships

== Previously on TVP1 ==
=== News show ===
- Wiadomości Dnia (1956-1958)
- Dziennik Telewizyjny (1958-1989)
- Wiadomości (1989-2023)

=== Talk show/Reporters ===
- Kwadrans polityczny (Political quarter of an hour) - morning political talk show
- Warto rozmawiać (It is worth to talk) - controversial talk show, accused of right-wing spinning, hosted by Jan Pospieszalski
- Magazyn śledczy Anity Gargas - investigative magazine
- ALARM! - reporters' magazine
- Magazyn Kryminalny 997 (Crime Magazine 997)

=== Polish TV series ===
- Four Tank-Men and a Dog
- More Than Life At Stake
- Plebania (Presbytery)
- Dom nad rozlewiskiem (House on water levels)
- Miłość nad rozlewiskiem (Love on water levels)
- Życie nad rozlewiskiem (Life on water levels)
- Nad rozlewiskiem (On water levels)
- Cisza nad rozlewiskiem (Silence on water levels)
- Pensjonat nad rozlewiskiem (Pension on water levels)
- Londyńczycy (The Londoners)
- Ratownicy (Lifeguards)
- Tak czy nie (Yes or no)
- Tygrysy Europy (Tigers of Europe)
- Chichot losu (Cheesy fate)
- 1920. Wojna i miłość (1920. War & Love)
- Determinator
- Siła wyższa (Force majeure)
- Galeria (CentoVetrine)
- Dekalog
- Uwikłani (Entangled)
- Bodo
- Strażacy (Firefighters)
- Ranczo (Ranch)
- Komisja morderstw (Commission of Murders)
- Komisariat (Police station)
- Drogi wolności (Dear freedom)
- Dziewczyny ze Lwowa (Girls from Lviv)
- Młody Piłsudski (Young Piłsudski)
- Stulecie Winnych (Our Century)
- Wojenne dziewczyny (Wartime Girls)
- Zatoka szpiegów (The Spy of Spies)

=== Foreign series ===
- JAG - in Polish "JAG - Wojskowe Biuro Śledcze"
- Kojak
- Jake and the Fatman - in Polish "Gliniarz i prokurator"
- Nash Bridges
- Baywatch - in Polish "Słoneczny patrol"
- Fireman Sam - in Polish "Strażak Sam"
- Frasier
- Everybody Loves Raymond - in Polish "Wszyscy kochają Raymonda"
- The Lost Room - in Polish "Zagubiony pokój"
- The District - in Polish "Bez pardonu" ("Without mercy")
- Lipstick Jungle - in Polish "Szminka w Wielkim Mieście"
- Crusoe
- The 4400
- Doctor Who
- Heroes - in Polish "Herosi"
- Terminator: The Sarah Connor Chronicles - in Polish "Terminator: Kroniki Sary Connor"
- Royal Pains - in Polish "Bananowy Doktor"
- Knight Rider - in Polish "Nieustraszony"
- Harper's Island - in Polish "Wyspa Harpera"
- Muhteşem Yüzyıl (Magnificent Century) - in Polish "Wspaniałe stulecie"
- The Bold and the Beautiful - in Polish "Moda na Sukces"
- Wizards of Waverly Place - in Polish "Czarodzieje z Waverly Place"
- The Backyardigans (in Polish Przyjaciele z podwórka)

=== Entertainment ===
- Miliard w rozumie (Billion in mind)
- Randka w ciemno (The Dating Game)
- Śmiechu warte (America's Funniest Home Videos)
- Lidzbarskie Wieczory Humoru i Satyry
- Jeden z dziesięciu - the Polish version of Fifteen to One.

== Logos and identities ==
1952 - 1956	1956 - 1963	1963 - 1970	1970 - 1975	1975 - 1976	1976 - 1985	1985 - 1987	1987 - 1990	1990 - 1992	1992 - 2003	2003–present	2021 - 2023 (idents only)

=== TVP1 HD ===
2011 - 2012	2012–present

== See also ==
- Telewizja Polska
- Television in Poland
- Eastern Bloc information dissemination
