= The Voice of Poland season 13 =

2022 season of Polish television show

The Voice of Poland
- Season 13
- Hosted by: Tomasz Kammel; Małgorzata Tomaszewska; Aleksander Sikora
- Judges: Justyna Steczkowska; Lanberry; Marek Piekarczyk; Tomson and Baron
- No. of contestants: 48
- Winner: Dominik Dudek
- Winning coach: Tomson & Baron
- Runner-up: Łukasz Drapała

Release
- Original network: TVP 2
- Original release: September 3 – November 19, 2022

Season chronology
- ← Previous; Season 12 Next → Season 14

The thirteenth season of the Polish singing competition The Voice of Poland began airing on September 3, 2022, on TVP 2. It is airing on Saturdays at 20:00. Tomson and Baron, Justyna Steczkowska and Marek Piekarczyk returned to the show for their eleventh, fifth and sixth season, respectively. Lanberry made her first appearance as a coach this season, replacing Sylwia Grzeszczak.

Dominik Dudek won the season, marking Tomson & Baron's second win as a coach.

== Panelists ==
On June 19, 2022, Justyna Steczkowska confirmed that she would return as a coach in the thirteenth season. On August 7, 2022, it was announced that Tomson and Baron, Marek Piekarczyk and new coach Lanberry would join Justyna Steczkowska as coaches this season. Lanberry replaced Sylwia Grzeszczak, who was a coach in the twelfth season and exited the panel. Tomasz Kammel, Małgorzata Tomaszewska and Aleksander Sikora returned to the show as hosts for their twelfth, third and second season, respectively.

Coaches of the thirteenth season

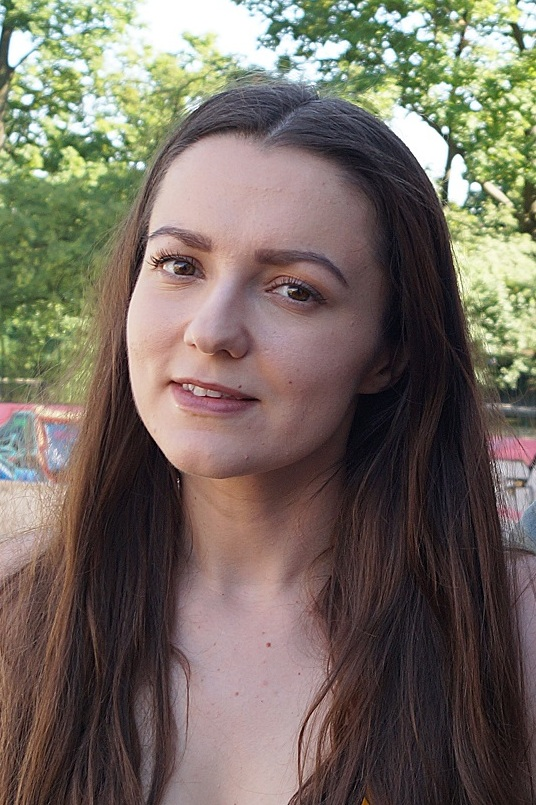
Lanberry

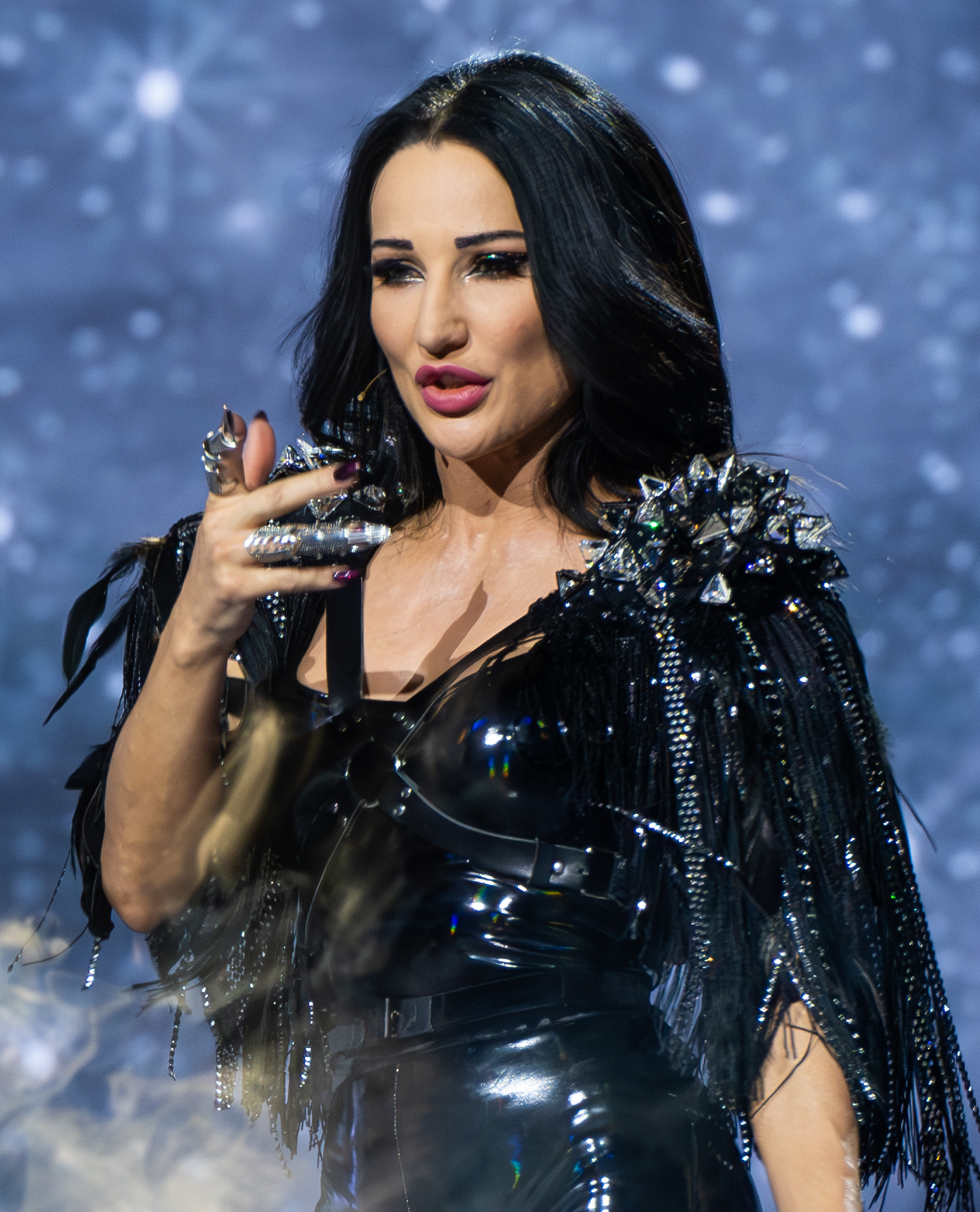
Justyna Steczkowska

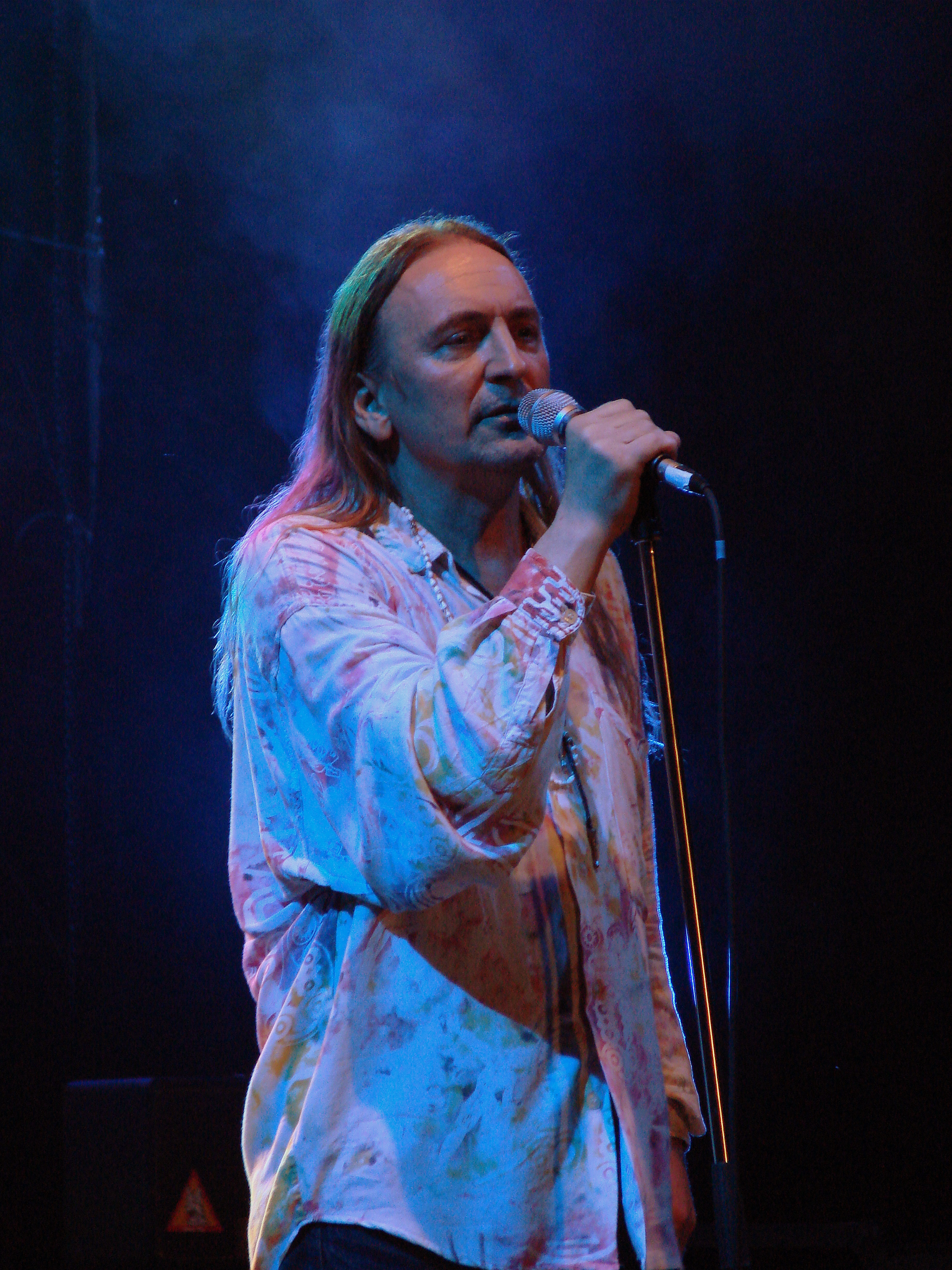
Marek Piekarczyk

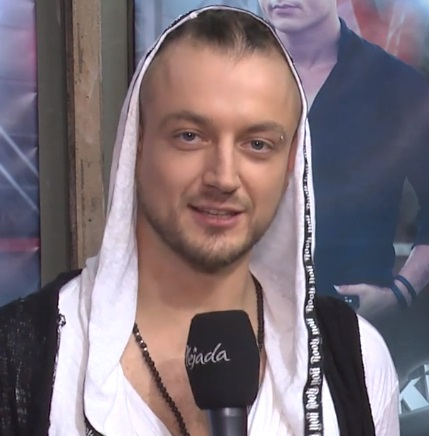
Baron

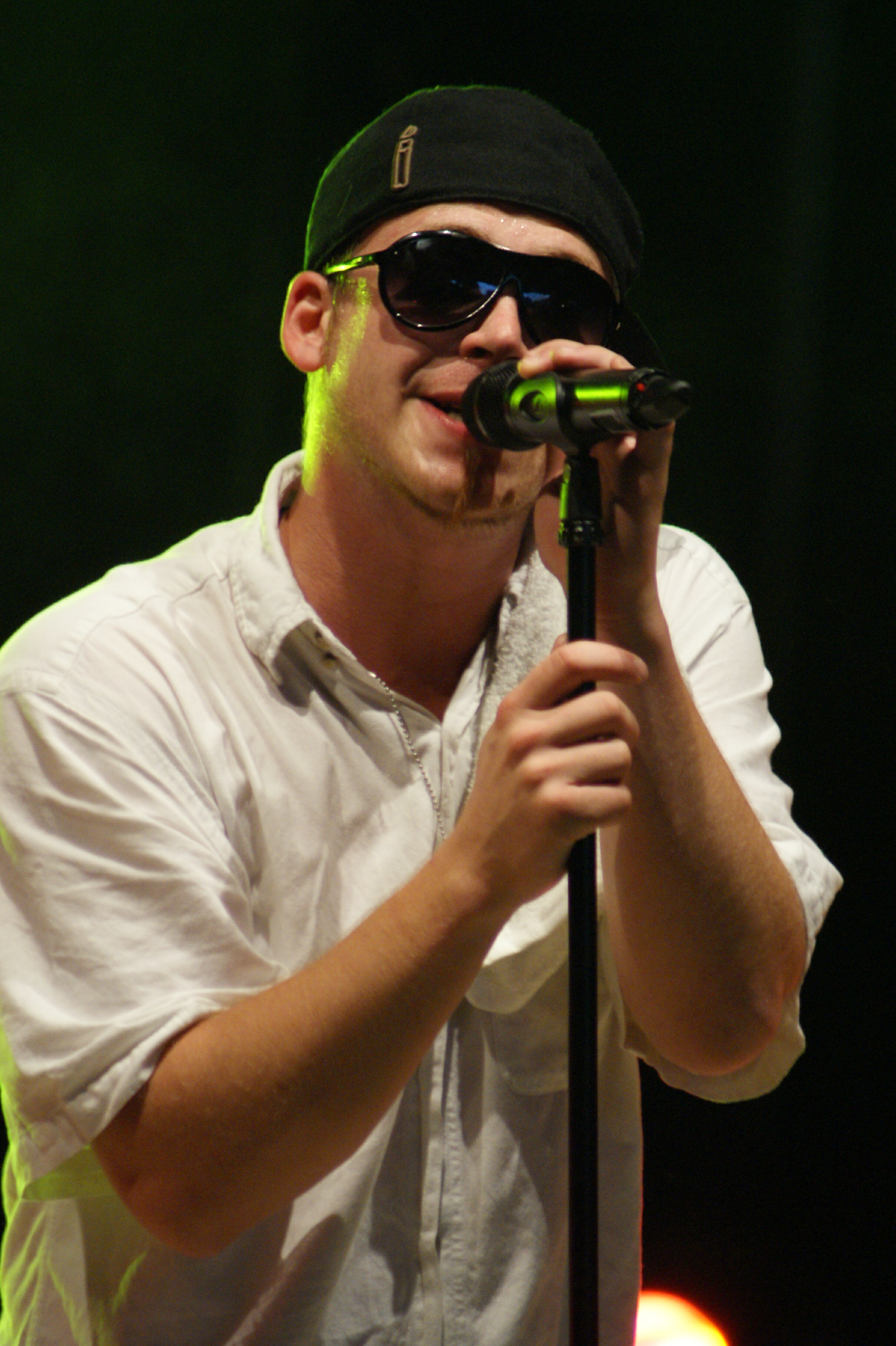
Tomson
Hosts of the thirteenth season

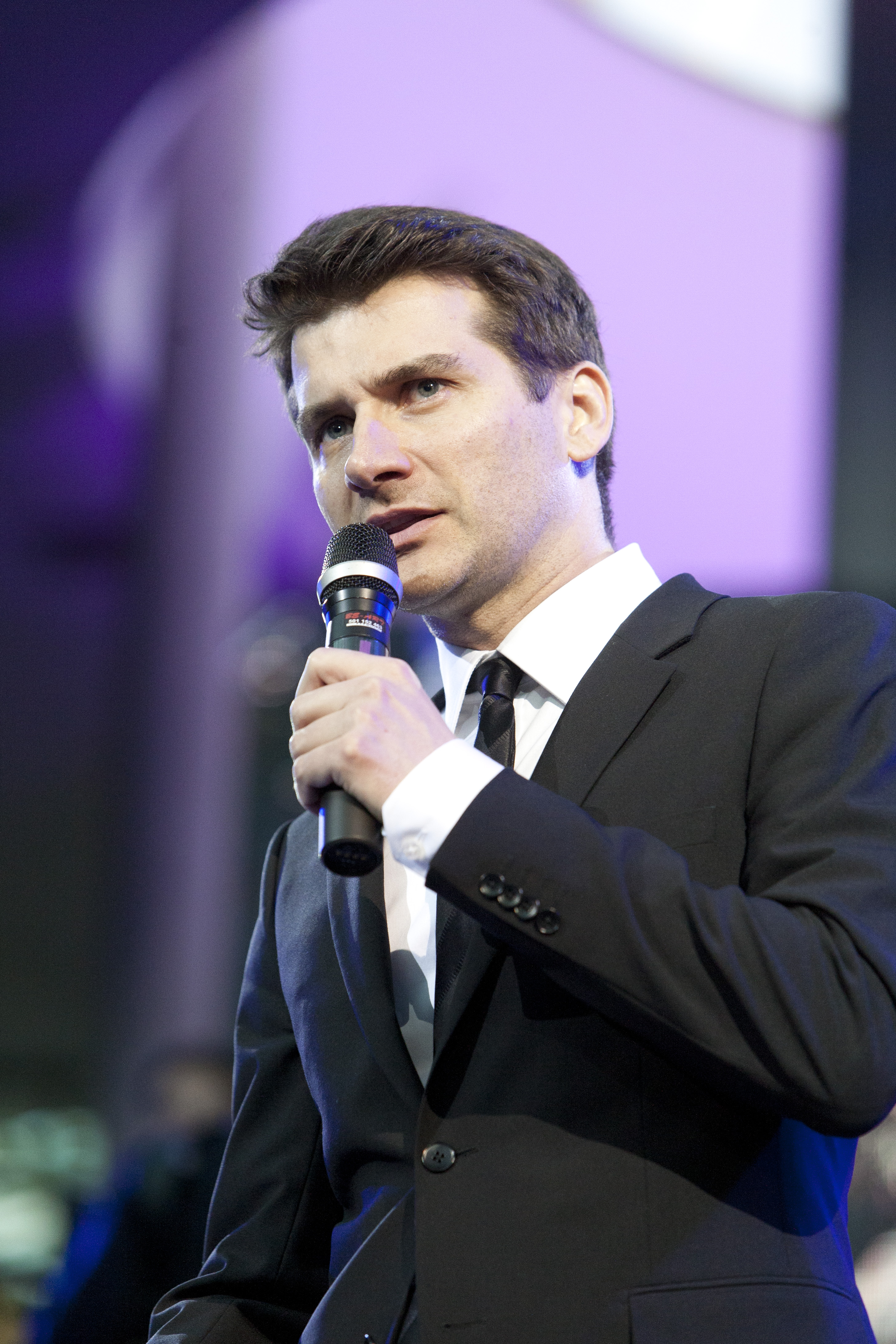
Tomasz Kammel

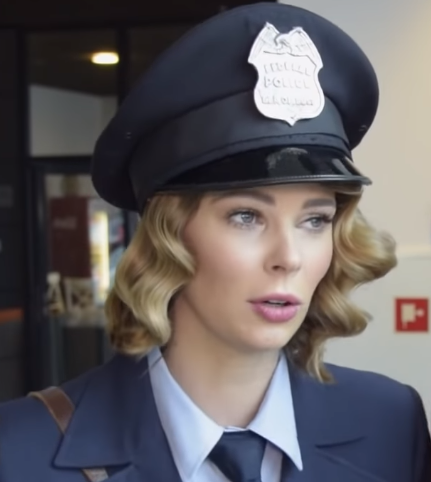
Małgorzata Tomaszewska

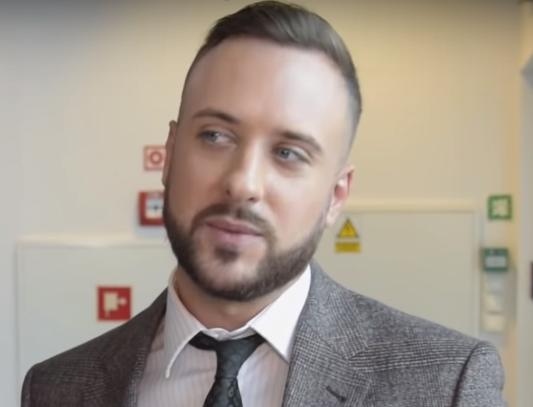
Aleksander Sikora

== Teams ==
Teams color key
Winner	Eliminated in the Live round
Runner-up	Eliminated in the Knockout round
Third place	Stolen in the Battle rounds
Fourth place	Stolen, switched with another artist and eliminated
Eliminated in the Semifinals	Eliminated in the Battle rounds
Eliminated in the Quarterfinals	Withdrew

Coaches' teams
Coach	Top 48 Artists				
Tomson & Baron					
Tomson & Baron	Dominik Dudek	Tetiana Diachenko	Evgen Peltek	Martin Rybczyński	Agata Górecka-Lipińska
Tomson & Baron	Kamila Ignatowicz	Kamil Szek	~~Karolina Lyndo~~	~~Daria Waleriańczyk~~	~~Bogdan Świerczek~~
Tomson & Baron	Mateusz Kurdej	Przemysław Zubowicz	Wiktoria Krakowska		
Justyna Steczkowska					
Justyna Steczkowska	Ewelina Gancewska	Julianna Olańska	Zofia Kurowska	Sandra Reizer	Karolina Lyndo
Justyna Steczkowska	Rafaela Maruska	Magdalena Nawojska	Andrzej Stankiewicz	Krzysztof Moczarski	Alicja Czernek
Justyna Steczkowska	Mateusz Stankiewicz	Antonina Krótki	Chris Falconnet		
Lanberry					
Lanberry	Łukasz Drapała	Norbert Wronka	Anna Buczkowska	Daria Waleriańczyk	Michał Bednarek
Lanberry	Kristina Dutchak	Maja Juszczak	~~Evgen Peltek~~	Rafał Talarczyk	Dominika Czekaj
Lanberry	Magdalena Górecka	Wiktor Andrysiak	Aleksandra Król		
Marek Piekarczyk					
Marek Piekarczyk	Konrad Baum	Bogdan Świerczek	Julia Szarlińska	Nobesuthu Khumalo	Jadwiga Grzybek
Marek Piekarczyk	Michał Ciężadlik	Gabriela Ždanovičiūtė	Vanessa Siwy	Isobelle Bundy	Daniel Najbor
Marek Piekarczyk	Hanna Hadomich	Klaudia Budner	Natalia Gosztyła		
Note: Italicized names are stolen artists (names struck through within former teams).

== Blind auditions ==
The show began with the Blind Auditions on September 3, 2022. In each audition, an artist sings their piece in front of the coaches whose chairs are facing the audience. If a coach is interested to work with the artist, they will press their button to face the artist. If a singular coach presses the button, the artist automatically becomes part of their team. If multiple coaches turn, they will compete for the artist, who will decide which team they will join. Each coach has two "blocks" to prevent another coach from getting an artist. Each coach ends up with 12 artists by the end of the blind auditions, creating a total of 48 artists advancing to the battles.

Blind auditions color key
✔	Coach pressed "I WANT YOU" button
	Artist elected a coach's team
	Artist defaulted to a coach's team
	Artist was eliminated with no coach pressing their button
✘	Coach pressed "I WANT YOU" button, but was blocked by another coach from getting the artist
	Blocked by Tomson & Baron Blocked by Justyna Blocked by Lanberry Blocked by Marek

Blind auditions results
Episode	Order	Artist	Age	Song	Coach's and artist's choices			
Episode	Order	Artist	Age	Song	Tomson & Baron	Justyna	Lanberry	Marek
Episode 1 (Saturday, September 3, 2022)
Episode 1 (Saturday, September 3, 2022)	1	Zofia Kurowska	29	"Nine Million Bicycles"	✔	✔	✔	✔
Episode 1 (Saturday, September 3, 2022)	2	Vanessa Siwy	18	"Man! I Feel Like a Woman!"	–	–	–	✔
Episode 1 (Saturday, September 3, 2022)	3	Oliwia Skóra	22	"Szary świat"	–	–	–	–
Episode 1 (Saturday, September 3, 2022)	4	Magdalena Górecka	26	"For You"	✔	–	✔	–
Episode 1 (Saturday, September 3, 2022)	5	Martin Rybczyński	29	"Englishman in New York"	✔	✔	✘	✔
Episode 2 (Saturday, September 3, 2022)
Episode 2 (Saturday, September 3, 2022)	1	Daria Waleriańczyk	27	"Sir Duke"	✔	–	✔	✔
Episode 2 (Saturday, September 3, 2022)	2	Julia Szarlińska	16	"How Long"	–	–	✔	✔
Episode 2 (Saturday, September 3, 2022)	3	Mateusz Kurdej	31	"Grace Kelly"	✔	–	–	✔
Episode 2 (Saturday, September 3, 2022)	4	Karolina Pasieka	22	"Idziesz ze mną"	–	–	–	–
Episode 2 (Saturday, September 3, 2022)	5	Magdalena Nawojska	24	"Killing Me Softly with His Song"	–	✔	✔	–
Episode 2 (Saturday, September 3, 2022)	6	Norbert Wronka	18	"Tears in Heaven"	✔	✔	✔	✔
Episode 3 (Saturday, September 10, 2022)
Episode 3 (Saturday, September 10, 2022)	1	Dominika Czekaj	25	"Jesteś lekiem na całe zło"	–	–	✔	✔
Episode 3 (Saturday, September 10, 2022)	2	Chris Falconnet	42	"Synchronize"	–	✔	–	✔
Episode 3 (Saturday, September 10, 2022)	3	Klaudia Hejman	18	"Płonąca stodoła"	–	–	–	–
Episode 3 (Saturday, September 10, 2022)	4	Kamila Ignatowicz	36	"I'll Be There For You"	✔	✔	✔	✔
Episode 3 (Saturday, September 10, 2022)	5	Evgen Peltek	29	"It's Hard To Get Around The Wind"	✔	✔	✔	✔
Episode 3 (Saturday, September 10, 2022)	6	Anna Gadomych	21	"If I Can Dream"	–	–	–	✔
Episode 4 (Saturday, September 10, 2022)
Episode 4 (Saturday, September 10, 2022)	1	Ewelina Gancewska	21	"Tańczące Eurydyki"	✔	✔	✔	✔
Episode 4 (Saturday, September 10, 2022)	2	Michał Kaczmarek	35	"Za-czekam"	–	–	–	–
Episode 4 (Saturday, September 10, 2022)	3	Julianna Olańska	30	"This World"	✔	✔	✔	✔
Episode 4 (Saturday, September 10, 2022)	4	Michał Ciężadlik	24	"Jezu, jak się cieszę"	–	–	–	✔
Episode 4 (Saturday, September 10, 2022)	5	Karolina Lyndo	20	"Dziesięć przykazań"	✔	–	✔	✔
Episode 4 (Saturday, September 10, 2022)	6	Konrad Baum	42	"Bruises"	✘	✔	✔	✔
Episode 5 (Saturday, September 17, 2022)
Episode 5 (Saturday, September 17, 2022)	1	Anna Buczkowska	27	"What's Up"	✔	✘	✔	✔
Episode 5 (Saturday, September 17, 2022)	2	Rafał Talarczyk	27	"Don't Break The Heart"	–	–	✔	–
Episode 5 (Saturday, September 17, 2022)	3	Isobelle Bundy	30	"Crazy"	–	✔	–	✔
Episode 5 (Saturday, September 17, 2022)	4	Kamil Szek	35	"Peron"	✔	✔	✔	✔
Episode 5 (Saturday, September 17, 2022)	5	Adriana Sobolewska	20	"Dżungla"	–	–	–	–
Episode 5 (Saturday, September 17, 2022)	6	Agata Górecka-Lipińska	26	"Shape Of You"	✔	✘	✔	✔
Episode 6 (Saturday, September 17, 2022)
Episode 6 (Saturday, September 17, 2022)	1	Wiktoria Krakowska	18	"Cisza jak ta"	✔	–	✔	✔
Episode 6 (Saturday, September 17, 2022)	2	Nobesuthu Lisa Khumalo	29	"Down On My Knees"	–	–	–	✔
Episode 6 (Saturday, September 17, 2022)	3	Andrzej Stankiewicz	19	"Wicked Game"	✔	✔	✔	✔
Episode 6 (Saturday, September 17, 2022)	4	Maja Juszczak	17	"Krakowski spleen"	–	–	✔	✔
Episode 6 (Saturday, September 17, 2022)	5	Magdalena Sałata	18	"Shivers"	–	–	–	–
Episode 6 (Saturday, September 17, 2022)	6	Łukasz Drapała	41	"Billie Jean"	✘	✔	✔	✔
Episode 7 (Saturday, September 17, 2022)
Episode 7 (Saturday, September 17, 2022)	1	Daniel Najbor	19	"O sobie samym"	–	–	✘	✔
Episode 7 (Saturday, September 17, 2022)	2	Gabriela Ždanovičiūtė	19	"Dłoń"	–	✔	–	✔
Episode 7 (Saturday, September 17, 2022)	3	Sandra Reizer	26	"The Sound of Silence"	✔	✔	✔	✔
Episode 7 (Saturday, September 17, 2022)	4	Kristina Dutchak	24	"All I Wanna Do Is Make Love To You"	–	✔	✔	✔
Episode 7 (Saturday, September 17, 2022)	5	Michał Chrapek	19	"Supermodel"	–	–	–	–
Episode 7 (Saturday, September 17, 2022)	6	Bogdan Świerczek	27	"Memories"	✔	✔	✔	✔
Episode 8 (Saturday, September 24, 2022)	1	Przemysław Zubowicz	38	"Galácticos"	✔	–	✔	–
Episode 8 (Saturday, September 24, 2022)	2	Klaudia Budner	30	"When Your Heart Is Weak"	–	–	–	✔
Episode 8 (Saturday, September 24, 2022)	3	Michał Bednarek	27	"As It Was"	–	–	✔	–
Episode 8 (Saturday, September 24, 2022)	4	Marzena Burzyńska	16	"Miasto 44"	–	–	–	–
Episode 8 (Saturday, September 24, 2022)	5	Krzysztof Moczarski	27	"River"	–	✔	–	–
Episode 8 (Saturday, September 24, 2022)	6	Tetiana "Aelin" Diachenko	N/A	"Crush"	✔	✔	✔	✔
Episode 9 (Saturday, September 24, 2022)	1	Wiktor Andrysiak	18	"Idziesz ze mną"	–	–	✔	–
Episode 9 (Saturday, September 24, 2022)	2	Alicja Czerner	18	"Ta sama chwila"	–	✔	–	✔
Episode 9 (Saturday, September 24, 2022)	3	Dominika Sojda	25	"Kolońska i szlugi"	–	–	–	–
Episode 9 (Saturday, September 24, 2022)	4	Rafaela Maruska	21	"Pocałuj noc"	–	✔	–	–
Episode 9 (Saturday, September 24, 2022)	5	Jadwiga Grzybek	34	"Dreams"	–	–	–	✔
Episode 9 (Saturday, September 24, 2022)	6	Mateusz Stankiewicz	25	"Ain't No Sunshine"	✘	✔	✔	–
Episode 10 (Saturday, September 24, 2022)	1	Natalia Gosztyła	26	"Twist In My Sobriety"	–	✔	–	✔
Episode 10 (Saturday, September 24, 2022)	2	Joanna Zawalska	26	"Ale jazz"	–	–	–	–
Episode 10 (Saturday, September 24, 2022)	3	Antonina Krótki	18	"I Wish It Would Rain Down"	–	✔	–	✔
Episode 10 (Saturday, September 24, 2022)	4	Aleksandra Król	22	"Sen"	✘	–	✔	–
Episode 10 (Saturday, September 24, 2022)	5	Patrycja Czyżewska	N/A	"Im więcej ciebie tym mniej"	–	–	–	–
Episode 10 (Saturday, September 24, 2022)	6	Dominik Dudek	28	"Helena"	✔	✔	✔	–

== Battles round ==
The battles began airing on October 1, 2022. In this round, the coaches pick two of their artists in a singing match and then select one of them to advance to the next round. Losing artists may be "stolen" by another coach, becoming new members of their team. Multiple coaches can attempt to steal an artist, resulting in a competition for the artist, who will ultimately decide which team they will go to. At the end of this round, seven artists will remain on each team; six will be battle winners, and one from a steal. In total, 24 artists advance to the knockouts.

Battles color key
Artist won the Battle and advances to the Knockouts
Artist lost the Battle but was stolen by another coach and advances to the Knockouts
Artist lost the Battle and was stolen by another coach, but was later switched with another artist and eliminated
Artist lost the Battle and was eliminated

Battles results
Episode & date	Coach	Order	Winner	Song	Loser	'Steal' result			
Episode & date	Coach	Order	Winner	Song	Loser	Tomson & Baron	Justyna	Lanberry	Marek
Episode 11 (Saturday, October 1, 2022)	Justyna	1	Rafela Maruska	"I'm Every Woman"	Alicja Czernek	—	—N/a	—	—
Episode 11 (Saturday, October 1, 2022)	Lanberry	2	Michał Bednarek	"Baby One More Time"	Wiktor Andrysiak	—	—	—N/a	—
Episode 11 (Saturday, October 1, 2022)	Tomson & Baron	3	Dominik Dudek	"Za daleko"	Wiktoria Krakowska	—N/a	—	—	—
Episode 11 (Saturday, October 1, 2022)	Marek	4	Jadwiga Grzybek	"Ja wysiadam"	Klaudia Budner	—	—	—	—N/a
Episode 11 (Saturday, October 1, 2022)	Lanberry	5	Kristina Dutchak	"All About That Bass"	Dominika Czekaj	—	—	—N/a	—
Episode 11 (Saturday, October 1, 2022)	Justyna	6	Sandra Reizer	"Ostatni"	Andrzej Stankiewicz	—	—N/a	✔	✔
Episode 11 (Saturday, October 1, 2022)	Tomson & Baron	7	Agata Górecka - Lipińska	"Bam Bam"	Mateusz Kurdej	—N/a	—	—	—
Episode 11 (Saturday, October 1, 2022)	Marek	8	Konrad Baum	"Spragniony"	Isobelle Bundy	✔	—	—	—N/a
Episode 12 (Saturday, October 8, 2022)	Justyna	1	Ewelina Gancewska	"Con te partirò (Time To Say Goodbye)"	Krzysztof Moczarski	—	—N/a	—	—
Episode 12 (Saturday, October 8, 2022)	Lanberry	2	Maja Juszczak	"Pół kroku stąd"	Rafał Talarczyk	—	✔	—N/a	✔
Episode 12 (Saturday, October 8, 2022)	Tomson & Baron	3	Kamila Ignatowicz	"Beautiful"	Karolina Lyndo	—N/a	✔	—	—
Episode 12 (Saturday, October 8, 2022)	Marek	4	Gabriela Zdanoviciute	"Chodź, pomaluj mój świat"	Natalia Gosztyła	—	—	—	—N/a
Episode 12 (Saturday, October 8, 2022)	Marek	5	Julia Szarlińska	"Can't Take My Eyes Off You"	Vanessa Siwy	—	—	—	—N/a
Episode 12 (Saturday, October 8, 2022)	Tomson & Baron	6	Kamil Szek	"Polski"	Przemysław Zubowicz	—N/a	—	—	—
Episode 12 (Saturday, October 8, 2022)	Justyna	7	Julianna Olańska	"Señorita"	Chris Falconnet	—	—N/a	—	—
Episode 12 (Saturday, October 8, 2022)	Lanberry	8	Anna Buczkowska	"Śpij kochanie, śpij"	Aleksandra Król	—	—	—N/a	—
Episode 13 (Saturday, October 15, 2022)	Justyna	1	Zofia Kurowska	"Eldorado"	Antonina Krótki	—	—N/a	—	—
Episode 13 (Saturday, October 15, 2022)	Lanberry	2	Norbert Wronka	"Another Love"	Evgen Peltek	✔	—	—	✔
Episode 13 (Saturday, October 15, 2022)	Tomson & Baron	3	Tetiana Diachenko	"Woman"	Daria Walerianczyk	—N/a	—	✔	✔
Episode 13 (Saturday, October 15, 2022)	Marek	4	Nobesuthu Lisa Khumalo	"Talkin' 'bout a Revolution"	Hanna Gadomich	—	—	—	—N/a
Episode 13 (Saturday, October 15, 2022)	Justyna	5	Magda Nawojska	"Byłaś serca biciem"	Mateusz Stankiewicz	—	—N/a	—	—
Episode 13 (Saturday, October 15, 2022)	Marek	6	Michał Ciężadlik	"Party"	Daniel Najbor	—	—	—	—N/a
Episode 13 (Saturday, October 15, 2022)	Tomson & Baron	7	Martin Rybczyński	"To Be With You"	Bogdan Świerczek	—N/a	✔	—	✔
Episode 13 (Saturday, October 15, 2022)	Lanberry	8	Łukasz Drapała	"List"	Magda Górecka	—	—	—N/a	—

== Knockout round ==
The Knockout round will premiere on October 22, 2022. During this stage, all contestants have to sing - the first four from each team are automatically put in the hot seats, and after subsequent performances of the remaining three, the coach decides whether a given contestant stays in the show or not. In the end, four contestants from each team qualify for the live episodes.

Knockout color key
Artist was not switched out and advanced to the Live Shows
Artist was eliminated, either immediately (indicated by a "—" in the "Switched with" column) or switched with another contestant

Knockouts results
Coach	Order	Artist	Song	Result	Switched with
Justyna Steczkowska	1	Ewelina Gancewska	"When You Believe"	Advanced	N/A
Justyna Steczkowska	2	Rafela Maruska	"One Moment In Time"	Eliminated	N/A
Justyna Steczkowska	3	Magda Nawojska	"Something's Got a Hold on Me"	Eliminated	N/A
Justyna Steczkowska	4	Sandra Reizer	"Kocham Cię"	Advanced	N/A
Justyna Steczkowska	5	Karolina Lyndo	"The Power Of Love"	Eliminated	Rafela Maruska
Justyna Steczkowska	6	Zofia Kurowska	"Beneath Your Beautiful"	Advanced	Magda Nawojska
Justyna Steczkowska	7	Julianna Olańska	"Faith"	Advanced	Karolina Lyndo
Lanberry	1	Daria Waleriańczyk	"Lustra"	Advanced	N/A
Lanberry	2	Michał Bednarek	"I Need a Dollar"	Eliminated	N/A
Lanberry	3	Łukasz Drapała	"C'est la Vie"	Advanced	N/A
Lanberry	4	Kristina Dutchak	"Try"	Eliminated	N/A
Lanberry	5	Maja Juszczak	"Prawda o nas"	Eliminated	Michał Bednarek
Lanberry	6	Anna Buczkowska	"Drivers License"	Advanced	Maja Juszczak
Lanberry	7	Norbert Wronka	"Shape of My Heart"	Advanced	Kristina Dutchak
Marek Piekarczyk	1	Michał Ciężadlik	"Jump"	Eliminated	N/A
Marek Piekarczyk	2	Jadwiga Grzybek	"Niebo dla Ciebie"	Eliminated	N/A
Marek Piekarczyk	3	Konrad Baum	"Początek"	Advanced	N/A
Marek Piekarczyk	4	Nobesuthu Lisa Khumalo	"Torn"	Advanced	N/A
Marek Piekarczyk	5	Gabriela Zdanoviciute	"Dziwny jest ten świat"	Eliminated	Jadwiga Grzybek
Marek Piekarczyk	6	Julia Szarlińska	"To nie ptak"	Advanced	Michał Ciężadlik
Marek Piekarczyk	7	Bogdan Świerczek	"Nic do stracenia"	Advanced	Gabriela Zdanoviciute
Tomson & Baron	1	Kamil Szek	"Come as You Are"	Eliminated	N/A
Tomson & Baron	2	Kamila Ignatowicz	"Girl on Fire"	Eliminated	N/A
Tomson & Baron	3	Martin Rybczyński	"Stolen Dance"	Advanced	N/A
Tomson & Baron	4	Agata Górecka - Lipińska	"Dance Monkey"	Eliminated	N/A
Tomson & Baron	5	Evgen Peltek	"Dreamer"	Advanced	Kamila Ignatowicz
Tomson & Baron	6	Dominik Dudek	"Miłość Miłość"	Advanced	Kamil Szek
Tomson & Baron	7	Tetiana Diachenko	"Dangerous Woman"	Advanced	Agata Górecka - Lipińska

== Live shows ==
The Live shows began on October 29, 2022. When the teams consist of four contestants, the coach chooses from among the two contestants with the fewest votes from the viewers (who decide by sending text messages) the person who drops out of the program. Each live episode ends with the elimination of one person from each group. In the semi-final (when the team is made up of two people), each coach divides 100 points to their artists in any way they want. The same happens with the viewers' votes, and the artist with the most points added passes through to the Final.

Live shows color key
Artist was saved by public's vote
Artist was saved by his/her coach
Artist was eliminated

=== Week 1: Live round (October 29) ===
Live round results
Episode	Order	Coach	Artist	Song	Result
Episode 15 (Saturday, October 29, 2022)	1	Justyna Steczkowska	Julianna Olańska	"Bad Romance"	Public's vote
Episode 15 (Saturday, October 29, 2022)	2	Justyna Steczkowska	Sandra Reizer	"Bez ciebie umieram"	Eliminated
Episode 15 (Saturday, October 29, 2022)	3	Justyna Steczkowska	Zofia Kurowska	"Man in the Mirror"	Public's vote
Episode 15 (Saturday, October 29, 2022)	4	Justyna Steczkowska	Ewelina Gancewska	"Milion gwiazd na niebie lśni"	Coaches' choice
Episode 15 (Saturday, October 29, 2022)	1	Lanberry	Daria Waleriańczyk	"Fighter"	Eliminated
Episode 15 (Saturday, October 29, 2022)	2	Lanberry	Norbert Wronka	"Writing's on the Wall"	Public's vote
Episode 15 (Saturday, October 29, 2022)	3	Lanberry	Anna Buczkowska	"Let it be"	Public's vote
Episode 15 (Saturday, October 29, 2022)	4	Lanberry	Łukasz Drapała	"Nieznajomy"	Coaches' choice
Episode 15 (Saturday, October 29, 2022)	1	Marek Piekarczyk	Konrad Baum	"Unchain My Heart"	Public's vote
Episode 15 (Saturday, October 29, 2022)	2	Marek Piekarczyk	Nobesuthu Lisa Khumalo	"What's Love Got to Do with It"	Eliminated
Episode 15 (Saturday, October 29, 2022)	3	Marek Piekarczyk	Bogdan Świerczek	"When I Was Your Man"	Public's vote
Episode 15 (Saturday, October 29, 2022)	4	Marek Piekarczyk	Julia Szarlińska	"Świat się pomylił"	Coach's choice
Episode 15 (Saturday, October 29, 2022)	1	Tomson & Baron	Dominik Dudek	"Feel"	Public's vote
Episode 15 (Saturday, October 29, 2022)	2	Tomson & Baron	Evgen Peltek	"Obejmij mnie"	Public's vote
Episode 15 (Saturday, October 29, 2022)	3	Tomson & Baron	Martin Rybczyński	"(Everything I Do) I Do It for You"	Eliminated
Episode 15 (Saturday, October 29, 2022)	4	Tomson & Baron	Tetiana Diachenko	"Ain't Nobody (Loves Me Better)"	Coach's choice

=== Week 2: Live round (November 5) ===
Live round results
Episode	Order	Coach	Artist	Song	Result
Episode 16 (Saturday, November 5, 2022)	1	Lanberry	Łukasz Drapała	"Don't Stop Me Now"	Coaches' choice
Episode 16 (Saturday, November 5, 2022)	2	Lanberry	Norbert Wronka	"Po prostu bądź"	Public's vote
Episode 16 (Saturday, November 5, 2022)	3	Lanberry	Anna Buczkowska	"Wodymidaj"	Eliminated
Episode 16 (Saturday, November 5, 2022)	1	Marek Piekarczyk	Bogdan Świerczek	"Wierzę w lepszy świat"	Public's vote
Episode 16 (Saturday, November 5, 2022)	2	Marek Piekarczyk	Julia Szarlińska	"I'm Not the Only One"	Eliminated
Episode 16 (Saturday, November 5, 2022)	3	Marek Piekarczyk	Konrad Baum	"Niepokonani"	Coaches' choice
Episode 16 (Saturday, November 5, 2022)	1	Tomson & Baron	Dominik Dudek	"Space Man"	Public's vote
Episode 16 (Saturday, November 5, 2022)	2	Tomson & Baron	Tetiana Diachenko	"Cuz I Love You"	Coach's choice
Episode 16 (Saturday, November 5, 2022)	3	Tomson & Baron	Evgen Peltek	"Losing My Religion"	Eliminated
Episode 16 (Saturday, November 5, 2022)	1	Justyna Steczkowska	Julianna Olańska	"Królowa Łez"	Coach's choice
Episode 16 (Saturday, November 5, 2022)	2	Justyna Steczkowska	Ewelina Gancewska	"Moon River"	Public's vote
Episode 16 (Saturday, November 5, 2022)	3	Justyna Steczkowska	Zofia Kurowska	"Zaopiekuj się mną"	Eliminated

=== Week 3: Semifinal (November 12, 2022) ===
Semifinal results
Episode	Order	Coach	Artist	Cover song	Original song	Points			Result
Episode	Order	Coach	Artist	Cover song	Original song	Coach	Public	Total	Result
Episode 17 (Saturday, November 12, 2022)
Episode 17 (Saturday, November 12, 2022)	1	Tomson & Baron	Tetiana Diachenko	"Error"	"To już za mną"	60%	14%	74%	Eliminated
Episode 17 (Saturday, November 12, 2022)	2	Tomson & Baron	Dominik Dudek	"Zbiór"	"Wydaje się"	40%	86%	126%	Advanced
Episode 17 (Saturday, November 12, 2022)	1	Lanberry	Norbert Wronka	"Careless Whisper"	"Historia o lataniu"	40%	44%	84%	Eliminated
Episode 17 (Saturday, November 12, 2022)	2	Lanberry	Łukasz Drapała	"Help!"	"Szalony Bal"	60%	56%	116%	Advanced
Episode 17 (Saturday, November 12, 2022)	1	Justyna Steczkowska	Julianna Olańska	"Toxic"	"Warstwy"	51%	43%	94%	Eliminated
Episode 17 (Saturday, November 12, 2022)	2	Justyna Steczkowska	Ewelina Gancewska	"Nie ma, nie ma Ciebie"	"Taka ja"	49%	57%	106%	Advanced
Episode 17 (Saturday, November 12, 2022)	1	Marek Piekarczyk	Bogdan Świerczek	"You're Beautiful"	"Na Głęboką Wodę"	25%	36%	61%	Eliminated
Episode 17 (Saturday, November 12, 2022)	2	Marek Piekarczyk	Konrad Baum	"Sorry Seems to Be the Hardest Word"	"Sam Jak Ty"	75%	64%	139%	Advanced

=== Week 4: Final (November 19, 2022) ===
Episode	Order	Coach	Artist	Song		Result
Episode 18 (Saturday, November 19, 2022)	1	Tomson & Baron	Dominik Dudek	Duet with coach	"Master Blaster (Jammin')"	Winner
Episode 18 (Saturday, November 19, 2022)	1	Tomson & Baron	Dominik Dudek	English song	"Earned It"	Winner
Episode 18 (Saturday, November 19, 2022)	1	Tomson & Baron	Dominik Dudek	Polish song	"Długość dźwięku samotności"	Winner
Episode 18 (Saturday, November 19, 2022)	1	Tomson & Baron	Dominik Dudek	Original song	"Wydaje się"	Winner
Episode 18 (Saturday, November 19, 2022)	2	Justyna Steczkowska	Ewelina Gancewska	Duet with coach	"Do Ciebie, mamo (list do matki)"	Fourth Place
Episode 18 (Saturday, November 19, 2022)	2	Justyna Steczkowska	Ewelina Gancewska	English song	"1944"	Fourth Place
Episode 18 (Saturday, November 19, 2022)	2	Justyna Steczkowska	Ewelina Gancewska	Polish song	—N/a	Fourth Place
Episode 18 (Saturday, November 19, 2022)	2	Justyna Steczkowska	Ewelina Gancewska	Original song	—N/a	Fourth Place
Episode 18 (Saturday, November 19, 2022)	3	Lanberry	Łukasz Drapała	Duet with coach	"Another Way to Die"	Runner-up
Episode 18 (Saturday, November 19, 2022)	3	Lanberry	Łukasz Drapała	English song	"The House of the Rising Sun"	Runner-up
Episode 18 (Saturday, November 19, 2022)	3	Lanberry	Łukasz Drapała	Polish song	"Nie proszę o więcej"	Runner-up
Episode 18 (Saturday, November 19, 2022)	3	Lanberry	Łukasz Drapała	Original song	"Szalony Bal"	Runner-up
Episode 18 (Saturday, November 19, 2022)	4	Marek Piekarczyk	Konrad Baum	Duet with coach	"Gdzie Jest Nasza Miłość?"	Third place
Episode 18 (Saturday, November 19, 2022)	4	Marek Piekarczyk	Konrad Baum	English song	"Human"	Third place
Episode 18 (Saturday, November 19, 2022)	4	Marek Piekarczyk	Konrad Baum	Polish song	"Boso"	Third place
Episode 18 (Saturday, November 19, 2022)	4	Marek Piekarczyk	Konrad Baum	Original song	—N/a	Third place

== Results summary of live shows ==
=== Color key ===
Artist's info

- Artist from Team Tomson & Baron
- Artist from Team Lanberry
- Artist from Team Justyna
- Artist from Team Marek

Result details

- Winner
- Runner-up
- Third place
- Fourth place
- Advanced to the finale with the most points
- Saved by his/her coach
- Saved by the public
- Eliminated

=== Overall ===
Live shows results per week
Artist	Week 1	Week 2	Week 3	Final
Dominik Dudek	Safe	Safe	Advanced	Winner
Łukasz Drapała	Safe	Safe	Advanced	Runner-up
Konrad Baum	Safe	Safe	Advanced	3rd place
Ewelina Gancewska	Safe	Safe	Advanced	4th place
Tetiana Diachenko	Safe	Safe	Eliminated	Eliminated (Week 3)
Norbert Wronka	Safe	Safe	Eliminated	Eliminated (Week 3)
Bogdan Świerczek	Safe	Safe	Eliminated	Eliminated (Week 3)
Julianna Olańska	Safe	Safe	Eliminated	Eliminated (Week 3)
Evgen Peltek	Safe	Eliminated	Eliminated (Week 2)	
Anna Buczkowska	Safe	Eliminated	Eliminated (Week 2)	
Julia Szarlińska	Safe	Eliminated	Eliminated (Week 2)	
Zofia Kurowska	Safe	Eliminated	Eliminated (Week 2)	
Martin Rybczyński	Eliminated	Eliminated (Week 1)		
Daria Waleriańczyk	Eliminated	Eliminated (Week 1)		
Nobesuthu Lisa Khumalo	Eliminated	Eliminated (Week 1)		
Sandra Reizer	Eliminated	Eliminated (Week 1)		

=== Per team ===
Live shows results per week
Artist	Week 1	Week 2	Week 3	Final
Dominik Dudek	Public's vote	Public's vote	Advanced	Winner
Tetiana Diachenko	Coach's choice	Coach's choice	Eliminated	
Evgen Peltek	Public's vote	Eliminated		
Martin Rybczyński	Eliminated			
Ewelina Gancewska	Coach's choice	Public's vote	Advanced	Fourth place
Julianna Olańska	Public's vote	Coach's choice	Eliminated	
Zofia Kurowska	Public's vote	Eliminated		
Sandra Reizer	Eliminated			
Łukasz Drapała	Coach's choice	Coach's choice	Advanced	Runner-up
Norbert Wronka	Public's vote	Public's vote	Eliminated	
Anna Buczkowska	Public's vote	Eliminated		
Daria Waleriańczyk	Eliminated			
Konrad Baum	Public's vote	Coach's choice	Advanced	Third place
Bogdan Świerczek	Public's vote	Public's vote	Eliminated	
Julia Szarlińska	Coach's choice	Eliminated		
Nobesuthu Khumalo	Eliminated			
