= The Voice of Poland season 12 =

2021 season of Polish television show

The Voice of Poland
- Season 12

Release
- Original network: TVP 2
- Original release: September 11 – December 4, 2021
- Hosted by: Tomasz Kammel; Małgorzata Tomaszewska; Aleksander Sikora; Michał Szczygieł
- Judges: Justyna Steczkowska; Sylwia Grzeszczak; Marek Piekarczyk; Tomson & Baron
- No. of contestants: 48
- Winner: Marta Burdynowicz
- Winning coach: Justyna Steczkowska
- Runner-up: Bartosz Madej

Season chronology
- ← Previous; Season 11 Next → Season 13

The twelfth season of The Voice of Poland began airing on September 11, 2021, on TVP 2. It is airing on Saturdays at 20:00. Tomson & Baron returned as coaches for their tenth season. Also Justyna Steczkowska and Marek Piekarczyk returned to the show after a seven-year break for their fourth and fifth season, respectively. Sylwia Grzeszczak joined the jury panel of the twelfth season of The Voice of Poland as a new female coach.

Marta Burdynowicz won the season, marking Justyna Steczkowska's second and final win as a coach.

== Coaches and hosts ==
On August 6, 2021, it was announced that Justyna Steczkowska, Tomson & Baron, Sylwia Grzeszczak and Marek Piekarczyk would become the coaches for the twelfth season of the show. On August 11, 2021, Tomasz Kammel and Małgorzata Tomaszewska confirmed that they would return as the hosts for their eleventh and second season, respectively. On August 20, 2021, it was announced that Aleksander Sikora would join Tomasz Kammel and Małgorzata Tomaszewska as the third host. On September 11, 2021, it was announced that season 8 finalist Michał Szczygieł would serve as the fourth and last host for the twelfth season of the show.

Coaches and hosts gallery

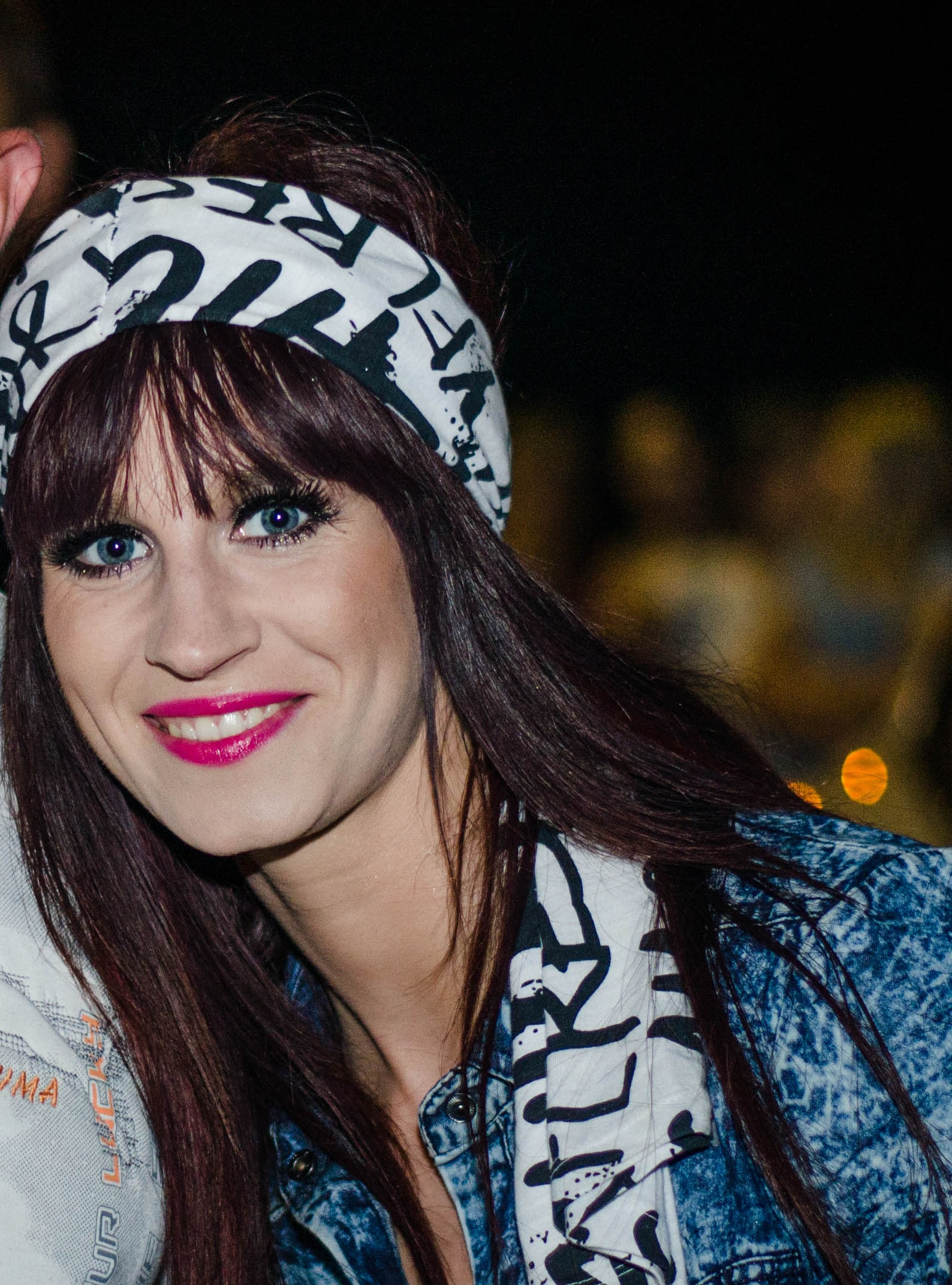
Sylwia Grzeszczak

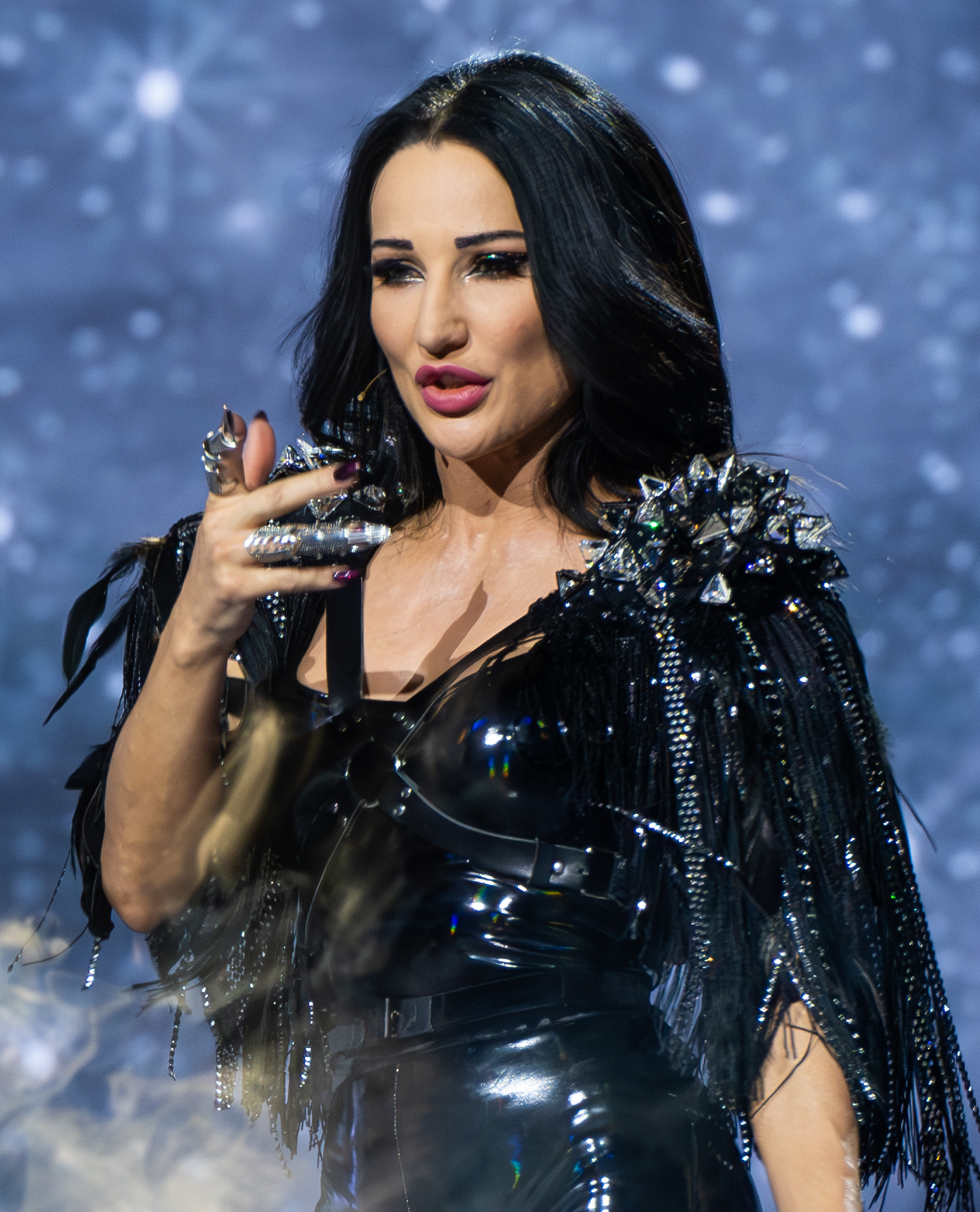
Justyna Steczkowska

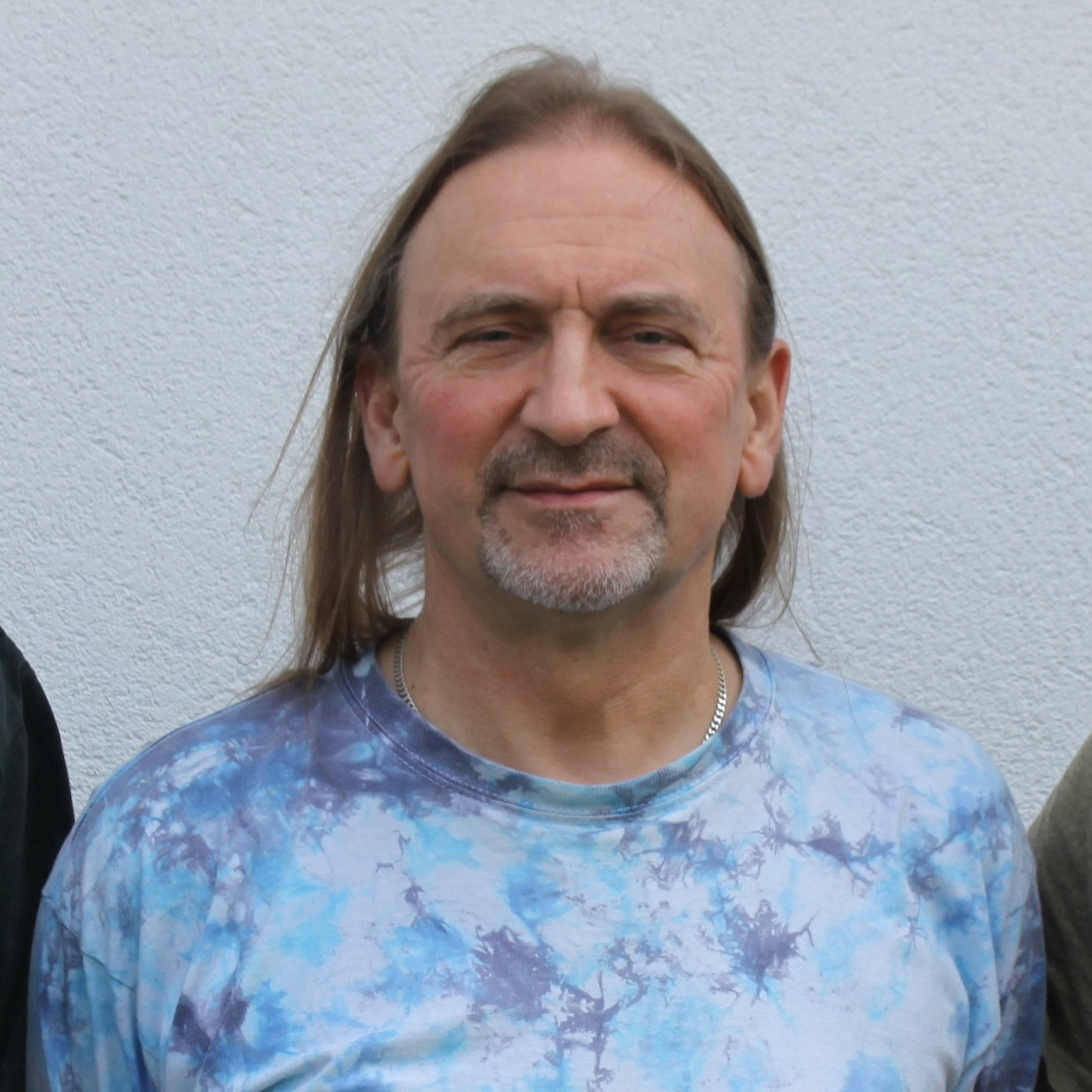
Marek Piekarczyk

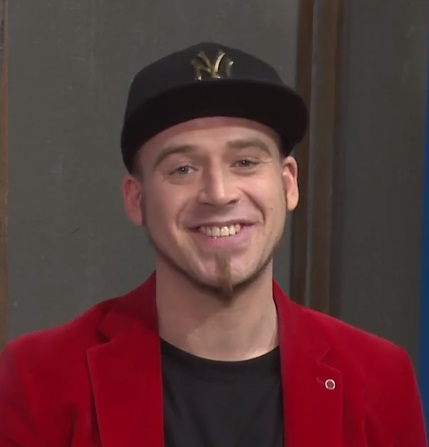
Tomasz Lach (duo)

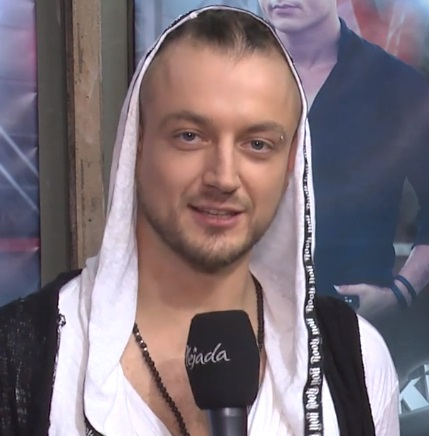
Aleksandr Milwiw-Baron (duo)

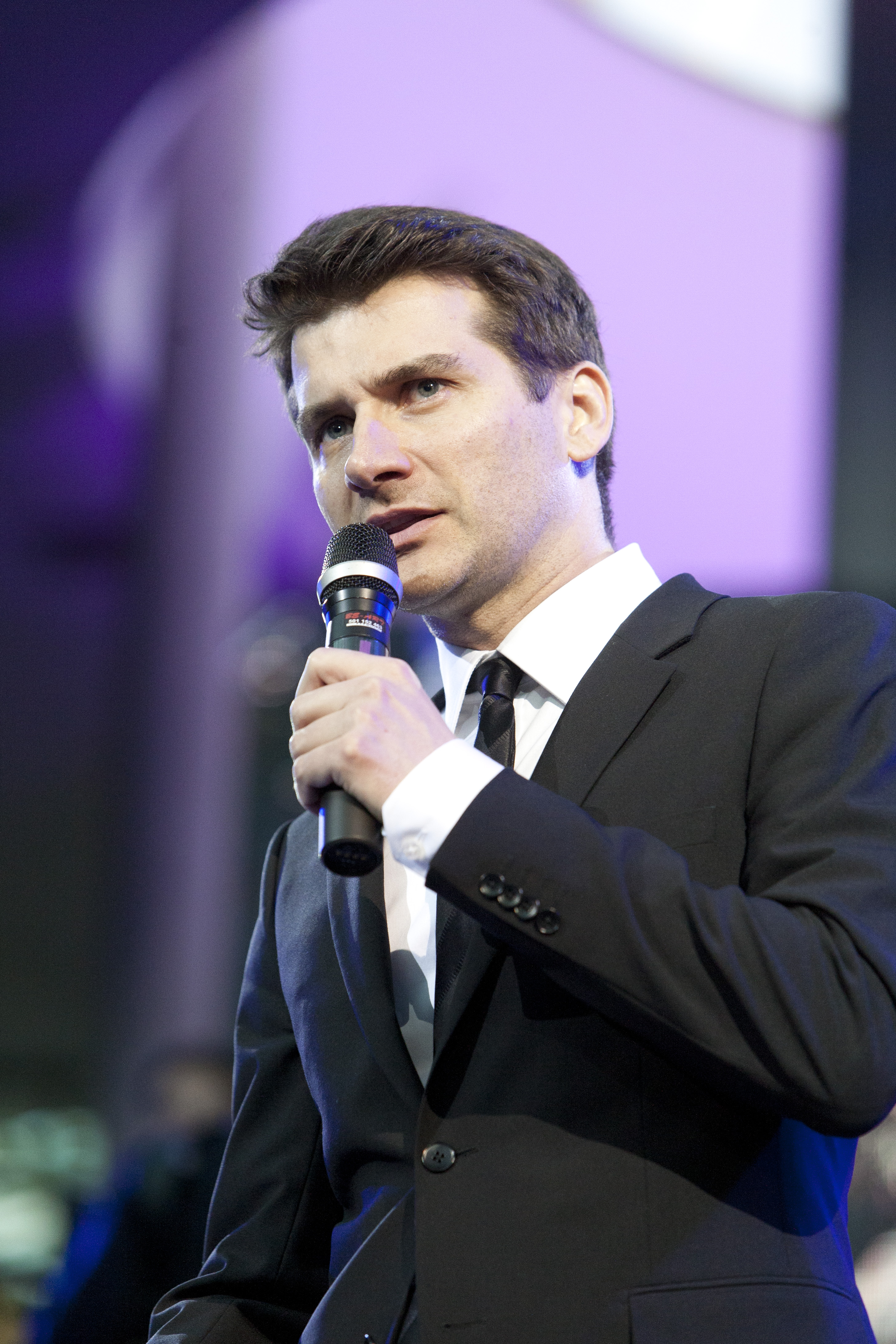
Tomasz Kammel

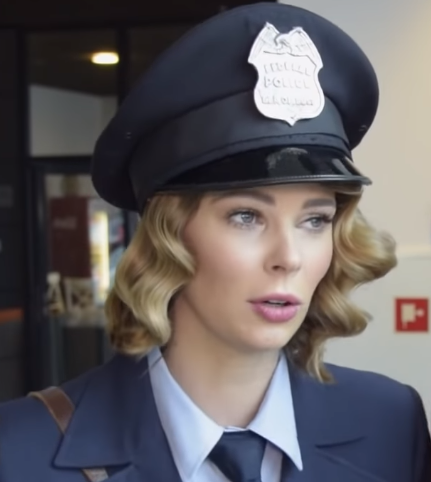
Małgorzata Tomaszewska

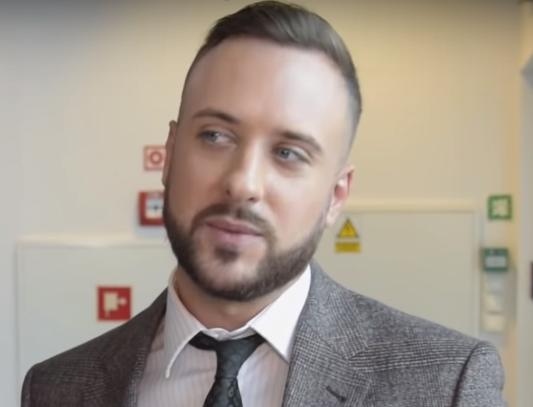
Aleksander Sikora

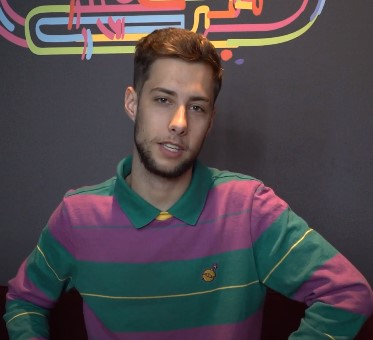
Michał Szczygieł

== Teams ==
Teams color key
Winner	Eliminated in the Live round
Runner-up	Eliminated in the Knockout round
Third place	Stolen in the Battle rounds
Fourth place	Stolen, switched with another artist and eliminated
Eliminated in the Semifinals	Eliminated in the Battle rounds
Eliminated in the Quarterfinals	Withdrew

Coaches' teams
Coach	Top 48 artists				
Sylwia Grzeszczak					
Sylwia Grzeszczak	Rafał Kozik	Julia Stolpe	Igor Kowalski	Daniel Hawes	Iga Andrzejczak
Sylwia Grzeszczak	Małgorzata Chruściel	Adrianna Rychwalska	Jakub Nowak	Gisela Quirós Pardos	Izabella Bilińska
Sylwia Grzeszczak	Karolina Makoś	Veronika Moloshna	Wiktor Zwierzyński		
Tomson & Baron					
Tomson & Baron	Wiktor Dyduła	Paulina Gołębiowska	Wiktor Kowalski	Elżbieta Łoboda	Małgorzata Grancewicz
Tomson & Baron	Julita Kaczyńska	Klaudia Kerstan	~~Karolina Piątek~~	~~Julia Stolpe~~	Filip Sterniuk
Tomson & Baron	Estera Androsiuk	Klaudia Borczyk	Marta Dzwonkowska		
Justyna Steczkowska					
Justyna Steczkowska	Marta Burdynowicz	Monika Wiśniowska-Basel	Adrianna & Paulina	Daniel Jodłowski	Jan Majewski
Justyna Steczkowska	Mariusz Mrówka	Aleksandra Pobiega	~~Wiktor Kowalski~~	Maciej Draus	Michalina Grzybowska
Justyna Steczkowska	Emilia Hamerlik	Paulina Ignac	Karolina Bokszczanin (Mirek)		
Marek Piekarczyk					
Marek Piekarczyk	Bartosz Madej	Karolina Robinson	Anna Hnatowicz-Cholewa	Karolina Piątek	Wiktoria Bińczyk
Marek Piekarczyk	Karolina Charko & Piotr Lato	Dorota Kaczmarek	~~Jan Majewski~~	Kornelia Daszewska	Karolina Szczurowska
Marek Piekarczyk	Mariusz Świątczak	Jakub & Wioletta	Adela Konop		
Note: Italicized names are stolen artists (names struck through within former teams).

== Blind auditions ==
The blind auditions began on September 11, 2021. Each coach has two "blocks" to prevent another coach from getting an artist with only 2 blocks permitted to be used per blind audition. Each coach ends up with 12 artists by the end of the blind auditions, creating a total of 48 artists advancing to the battles.

Blind auditions color key
✔	Coach pressed "I WANT YOU" button
	Artist elected a coach's team
	Artist defaulted to a coach's team
	Artist was eliminated with no coach pressing their button
✘	Coach pressed "I WANT YOU" button, but was blocked by another coach from getting the artist
	Blocked by Sylwia Blocked by Tomson & Baron Blocked by Justyna Blocked by Marek

Blind auditions results
Episode	Order	Artist	Age	Song	Coach's and artist's choices			
Episode	Order	Artist	Age	Song	Sylwia	Tomson & Baron	Justyna	Marek
Episode 1 (Saturday, September 11, 2021)
Episode 1 (Saturday, September 11, 2021)	1	Małgorzata Grancewicz	34	"Niech żyje bal"	–	✔	✔	–
Episode 1 (Saturday, September 11, 2021)	2	Veronika Moloshna	24	"Juice"	✔	✔	✔	✔
Episode 1 (Saturday, September 11, 2021)	3	Krzysztof Miętkiewicz	27	"Nic tu po mnie"	–	–	–	–
Episode 1 (Saturday, September 11, 2021)	4	Paulina Gołębiowska	34	"I Just Want to Make Love to You"	✔	✔	✔	✔
Episode 1 (Saturday, September 11, 2021)	5	Igor Kowalski	19	"Dancing On My Own"	✔	✔	✔	✘
Episode 2 (Saturday, September 11, 2021)
Episode 2 (Saturday, September 11, 2021)	1	Bartosz Madej	26	"Nights in White Satin"	–	–	✔	✔
Episode 2 (Saturday, September 11, 2021)	2	Karolina Charko & Piotr Lato	N/A	"Stitched up"	–	–	✔	✔
Episode 2 (Saturday, September 11, 2021)	3	Katarzyna Miednik	26	"Pamiętasz, była jesień"	–	–	–	–
Episode 2 (Saturday, September 11, 2021)	4	Emilia Hamerlik	25	"1+1"	✔	✔	✔	–
Episode 2 (Saturday, September 11, 2021)	5	Jan Więckowski	28	"All You Ever Wanted"	–	–	–	–
Episode 2 (Saturday, September 11, 2021)	6	Klaudia Kerstan	20	"Rysunek na szkle"	–	✔	–	–
Episode 2 (Saturday, September 11, 2021)	7	Marta Burdynowicz	28	"Szklanka wody"	✔	✔	✔	✔
Episode 3 (Saturday, September 18, 2021)
Episode 3 (Saturday, September 18, 2021)	1	Małgorzata Chruściel	30	"Wszystko będzie dobrze"	✔	–	–	✔
Episode 3 (Saturday, September 18, 2021)	2	Jakub Nowak	19	"Don't Make Me Miss You"	✔	–	–	✔
Episode 3 (Saturday, September 18, 2021)	3	Klaudia Borczyk	30	"Opowieść"	✔	✔	–	✔
Episode 3 (Saturday, September 18, 2021)	4	Rafał Kowalkowski	45	"Whiskey in the Jar"	–	–	–	–
Episode 3 (Saturday, September 18, 2021)	5	Paulina Ignac	18	"Dziś już wiem"	–	–	✔^{1}	–
Episode 3 (Saturday, September 18, 2021)	6	Wiktor Dyduła	24	"Falling"	–	✔	✔	✔
Episode 4 (Saturday, September 18, 2021)
Episode 4 (Saturday, September 18, 2021)	1	Adrianna Owczarczyk & Paulina Szymlek	29 & 33	"Dancing On My Own"	✔	–	✔	✔
Episode 4 (Saturday, September 18, 2021)	2	Daniel Jodłowski	24	"Versace on the Floor"	✘	–	✔	✔
Episode 4 (Saturday, September 18, 2021)	3	Klaudia Szwajkosz	30	"Please Don't Leave Me"	–	–	–	–
Episode 4 (Saturday, September 18, 2021)	4	Natalia Łyzińska	24	"Sztorm"	–	–	–	–
Episode 4 (Saturday, September 18, 2021)	5	Kornelia Daszewska	26	"Hear My Voice"	–	–	✔	✔
Episode 4 (Saturday, September 18, 2021)	6	Daniel Hawes	18	"Little Bit of Love"	✔	–	–	✔
Episode 4 (Saturday, September 18, 2021)	7	Dorota Kaczmarek	24	"List"	–	–	–	✔
Episode 5 (Saturday, September 25, 2021)
Episode 5 (Saturday, September 25, 2021)	1	Wiktor Kowalski	29	"Summertime"	–	✔	✔	–
Episode 5 (Saturday, September 25, 2021)	2	Michalina Grzybowska	17	"The Winner Takes It All"	–	–	✔	–
Episode 5 (Saturday, September 25, 2021)	3	Julia Marcinkowska	20	"Małe Tęsknoty"	–	–	–	–
Episode 5 (Saturday, September 25, 2021)	4	Anna Hnatowicz-Cholewa	32	"Only Love Can Hurt Like This"	✔	–	✔	✔
Episode 5 (Saturday, September 25, 2021)	5	Ewa Kępińska	28	"Prawda o nas"	–	–	–	–
Episode 5 (Saturday, September 25, 2021)	6	Wiktoria Bińczyk	23	"Love Never Felt So Good"	–	–	✔	✔
Episode 5 (Saturday, September 25, 2021)	7	Elżbieta Łoboda	24	"P.D.A. (We Just Don't Care)"	–	✔	✔	✔
Episode 6 (Saturday, September 25, 2021)
Episode 6 (Saturday, September 25, 2021)	1	Aleksandra Pobiega	21	"Alone"	–	–	✔	✔
Episode 6 (Saturday, September 25, 2021)	2	Barbara Rudnicka	23	"Dobry Moment"	–	–	–	–
Episode 6 (Saturday, September 25, 2021)	3	Wiktor Zwierzyński	19	"Give Me Love"	✔	✘	✔	✘
Episode 6 (Saturday, September 25, 2021)	4	Karolina Bokszczanin (Mirek)	22	"Lithium"	✔	✔	✔	✔
Episode 6 (Saturday, September 25, 2021)	5	Justyna Jędrusik	31	"Kiedy powiem sobie dość"	–	–	–	–
Episode 6 (Saturday, September 25, 2021)	6	Karolina Szczurowska	19	"Never Grow Up"	–	–	–	✔
Episode 6 (Saturday, September 25, 2021)	7	Julita Kaczyńska	26	"Bird Set Free"	–	✔	–	✔
Episode 7 (Saturday, October 2, 2021)
Episode 7 (Saturday, October 2, 2021)	1	Rafał Kozik	25	"Bo jesteś Ty"	✔	–	–	✔
Episode 7 (Saturday, October 2, 2021)	2	Julia Jarząbek	19	"Powinnam?"	–	–	–	–
Episode 7 (Saturday, October 2, 2021)	3	Adrianna Rychwalska	33	"Bird Set Free"	✔	✔	–	✘
Episode 7 (Saturday, October 2, 2021)	4	Filip Sterniuk	21	"Nothing's Gonna Change My Love for You"	–	✔	–	✔
Episode 7 (Saturday, October 2, 2021)	5	Adela Konop	30	"Powerful"	–	–	✔	✔
Episode 7 (Saturday, October 2, 2021)	6	Krzysztof Piegzik	24	"Save Your Tears"	–	–	–	–
Episode 7 (Saturday, October 2, 2021)	7	Karolina Piątek	26	"Chain of Fools"	–	✔	✔	–
Episode 8 (Saturday, October 2, 2021)
Episode 8 (Saturday, October 2, 2021)	1	Karolina Makoś	25	"Drivers License"	✔	–	✔	✔
Episode 8 (Saturday, October 2, 2021)	2	Monika Wiśniowska-Basel	35	"Addicted to You"	✔	✘	✔	✔
Episode 8 (Saturday, October 2, 2021)	3	Kinga Kubik	20	"Kolorowy wiatr"	–	–	–	–
Episode 8 (Saturday, October 2, 2021)	4	Mariusz Mrówka	19	"Here Without You"	✔	✔	✔	✔
Episode 8 (Saturday, October 2, 2021)	5	Michalina Skraburska	30	"Koła czasu"	–	–	–	–
Episode 8 (Saturday, October 2, 2021)	6	Mariusz Świątczak	27	"Maybe Tomorrow"	–	✔	✔	✔
Episode 8 (Saturday, October 2, 2021)	7	Julia Stolpe	37	"If I Could Turn Back Time"	–	✔	–	✔
Episode 9 (Saturday, October 9, 2021)
Episode 9 (Saturday, October 9, 2021)	1	Gisela Quirós Pardos	18	"Bleeding Love"	✔	–	–	✔
Episode 9 (Saturday, October 9, 2021)	2	Iga Andrzejczak	19	"A to co mam"	✔	✔	–	–
Episode 9 (Saturday, October 9, 2021)	3	Jakub Zajączkowski & Wioletta Wojszwiłło	N/A	"All Summer Long"	–	–	–	✔
Episode 9 (Saturday, October 9, 2021)	4	Błażej Latos	25	"Lubię być z nią"	–	–	–	–
Episode 9 (Saturday, October 9, 2021)	5	Paulina Oporska	22	"Family Affair"	–	–	–	–
Episode 9 (Saturday, October 9, 2021)	6	Jan Majewski	16	"If You Don't Know Me by Now"	✔	–	–	✔
Episode 10 (Saturday, October 9, 2021)
Episode 10 (Saturday, October 9, 2021)	1	Karolina Robinson	23	"Have a Little Faith in Me"	✘	✔	✔	✔
Episode 10 (Saturday, October 9, 2021)	2	Estera Androsiuk	23	"Za krótki sen"	–	✔	–	✔
Episode 10 (Saturday, October 9, 2021)	3	Ula Issel	28	"Un-Break My Heart"	–	–	–	–
Episode 10 (Saturday, October 9, 2021)	4	Izabela Bilińska	21	"Lost on You"	✔	–	–	✔
Episode 10 (Saturday, October 9, 2021)	5	Kasia Rosołek	31	"Unwritten"	–	–	–	–
Episode 10 (Saturday, October 9, 2021)	6	Maciej Draus	23	"List"	–	–	✔	–
Episode 10 (Saturday, October 9, 2021)	7	Marta Dzwonkowska	39	"Hot Right Now"	✔	✔	–	–

^1 Marek pressed Justyna's button.

== Battles round ==
The battles began airing on October 16, 2021. In this round, the coaches pick two of their artists in a singing match and then select one of them to advance to the next round. Losing artists may be "stolen" by another coach, becoming new members of their team. Multiple coaches can attempt to steal an artist, resulting in a competition for the artist, who will ultimately decide which team they will go to. At the end of this round, seven artists will remain on each team; six will be battle winners, and one from a steal. In total, 28 artists advance to the knockouts.

Battles color key
Artist won the Battle and advances to the Knockouts
Artist lost the Battle but was stolen by another coach and advances to the Knockouts
Artist lost the Battle and was stolen by another coach, but was later switched with another artist and eliminated
Artist lost the Battle and was eliminated

Battles results
Episode & date	Coach	Order	Winner	Song	Loser	'Steal' result			
Episode & date	Coach	Order	Winner	Song	Loser	Sylwia	Tomson & Baron	Justyna	Marek
Episode 11 (Saturday, October 16, 2021)	Justyna	1	Marta Burdynowicz	"My Heart Will Go On"	Wiktor Kowalski	✔	✔	—N/a	—
Episode 11 (Saturday, October 16, 2021)	Tomson & Baron	2	Małgorzata Grancewicz	"Szampan"	Estera Androsiuk	—	—N/a	—	—
Episode 11 (Saturday, October 16, 2021)	Sylwia	3	Igor Kowalski	"Everlasting Love"	Jakub Nowak	—N/a	—	—	✔
Episode 11 (Saturday, October 16, 2021)	Marek	4	Wiktoria Bińczyk	"Wymyśliłem Ciebie"	Adela Konop^{2}	—N/a	—N/a	—N/a	—N/a
Episode 11 (Saturday, October 16, 2021)	Justyna	5	Aleksandra Pobiega	"Groszki i róże"	Michalina Grzybowska	—	—	—N/a	—
Episode 11 (Saturday, October 16, 2021)	Marek	6	Karolina Charko & Piotr Lato	"Daddy Lessons"	Jakub Zajączkowski & Wioletta Wojszwiłło	—	—	—	—N/a
Episode 11 (Saturday, October 16, 2021)	Sylwia	7	Daniel Hawes	"Wszystko mi mówi, że mnie ktoś pokochał"	Izabela Bilińska	—N/a	—	—	—
Episode 11 (Saturday, October 16, 2021)	Tomson & Baron	8	Wiktor Dyduła	"Look What I Found"	Julia Stolpe	✔	—N/a	—	—
Episode 12 (Saturday, October 23, 2021)	Tomson & Baron	1	Julita Kaczyńska	"Bad Habits"	Marta Dzwonkowska	—	—N/a	—	—
Episode 12 (Saturday, October 23, 2021)	Sylwia	2	Iga Andrzejczak	"Ale jazz!"	Karolina Makoś	—N/a	—	—	—
Episode 12 (Saturday, October 23, 2021)	Justyna	3	Monika Wiśniowska-Basel	"Jestem kobietą"	Emilia Hamerlik	—	—	—N/a	—
Episode 12 (Saturday, October 23, 2021)	Marek	4	Anna Hnatowicz-Cholewa	"W co mam wierzyć"	Kornelia Daszewska	—	—	—	—N/a
Episode 12 (Saturday, October 23, 2021)	Sylwia	5	Adrianna Rychwalska	"Puerto Rico"	Gisela Quirós Pardos	—N/a	—	✔	—
Episode 12 (Saturday, October 23, 2021)	Tomson & Baron	6	Klaudia Kerstan	"Przypływy"	Filip Sterniuk	—	—N/a	—	✔
Episode 12 (Saturday, October 23, 2021)	Justyna	7	Mariusz Mrówka	"Viva la Vida"	Maciej Draus	—	—	—N/a	—
Episode 12 (Saturday, October 23, 2021)	Marek	8	Karolina Robinson	"Stand By Me"	Karolina Szczurowska	—	—	—	—N/a
Episode 13 (Saturday, October 30, 2021)	Sylwia	1	Małgorzata Chruściel	"Let's Get Loud"	Veronika Moloshna	—N/a	—	—	—
Episode 13 (Saturday, October 30, 2021)	Marek	2	Dorota Kaczmarek	"Złoto"	Mariusz Świątczak	—	—	—	—N/a
Episode 13 (Saturday, October 30, 2021)	Tomson & Baron	3	Elżbieta Łoboda	"Spontan"	Klaudia Borczyk	—	—N/a	—	—
Episode 13 (Saturday, October 30, 2021)	Justyna	4	Adrianna Owczarczyk & Paulina Szymlek	"Time After Time"	Paulina Ignac	—	—	—N/a	—
Episode 13 (Saturday, October 30, 2021)	Sylwia	5	Rafał Kozik	"I Ciebie też, bardzo"	Wiktor Zwierzyński	—N/a	—	—	—
Episode 13 (Saturday, October 30, 2021)	Tomson & Baron	6	Paulina Gołębiowska	"I Wanna Be The Only One"	Karolina Piątek	—	—N/a	✔	✔
Episode 13 (Saturday, October 30, 2021)	Justyna	7	Daniel Jodłowski	"Wybacz"	Karolina Bokszczanin (Mirek)	—	—	—N/a	—
Episode 13 (Saturday, October 30, 2021)	Marek	8	Bartosz Madej	"Walk of Life"	Jan Majewski	—	—	✔	—N/a

^2 Due to health conditions Adela Konop was forced to withdraw. As a result Wiktoria Bińczyk sang with her coach, Marek Piekarczyk.

Non-competition performance
Episode	Performers	Song
11	Ray Dalton & Álvaro Soler	"Manila"

== Knockouts round ==
The Knockout round will premiere on November 6, 2021. During this stage, all contestants have to sing - the first four from each team are automatically put in the hot seats, and after subsequent performances of the remaining three, the coach decides whether a given contestant stays in the show or not. In the end, four contestants from each team qualify for the live episodes.

Knockout color key
Artist was not switched out and advanced to the Live Shows
Artist was eliminated, either immediately (indicated by a "—" in the "Switched with" column) or switched with another contestant

Knockouts results
Episode	Order	Coach	Artist	Song	Result	Switched with
Episode 14 (Saturday, November 6, 2021)	1	Tomson & Baron	Paulina Gołębiowska	"Ain't No Other Man"	Advanced	N/A
Episode 14 (Saturday, November 6, 2021)	2	Tomson & Baron	Klaudia Kerstan	"Motyle i ćmy"	Eliminated	N/A
Episode 14 (Saturday, November 6, 2021)	3	Tomson & Baron	Wiktor Kowalski	"The Show Must Go On"	Advanced	N/A
Episode 14 (Saturday, November 6, 2021)	4	Tomson & Baron	Julita Kaczyńska	"Ta sama chwila"	Eliminated	N/A
Episode 14 (Saturday, November 6, 2021)	5	Tomson & Baron	Małgorzata Grancewicz	"Fleciki"	Eliminated	Julita Kaczyńska
Episode 14 (Saturday, November 6, 2021)	6	Tomson & Baron	Elżbieta Łoboda	"Nothing Breaks Like a Heart"	Advanced	Klaudia Kerstan
Episode 14 (Saturday, November 6, 2021)	7	Tomson & Baron	Wiktor Dyduła	"Nieśmiertelni"	Advanced	Małgorzata Grancewicz
Episode 14 (Saturday, November 6, 2021)	1	Justyna Steczkowska	Monika Wiśniowska-Basel	"A Woman's Worth"	Advanced	N/A
Episode 14 (Saturday, November 6, 2021)	2	Justyna Steczkowska	Daniel Jodłowski	"Dive"	Advanced	N/A
Episode 14 (Saturday, November 6, 2021)	3	Justyna Steczkowska	Marta Burdynowicz	"I'll Never Love Again"	Advanced	N/A
Episode 14 (Saturday, November 6, 2021)	4	Justyna Steczkowska	Aleksandra Pobiega	"Harder"	Eliminated	N/A
Episode 14 (Saturday, November 6, 2021)	5	Justyna Steczkowska	Jan Majewski	"Just the Way You Are"	Eliminated	—
Episode 14 (Saturday, November 6, 2021)	6	Justyna Steczkowska	Mariusz Mrówka	"Say You Won't Let Go"	Eliminated	—
Episode 14 (Saturday, November 6, 2021)	7	Justyna Steczkowska	Adrianna Owczarczyk & Paulina Szymlek	"Nothing Compares 2 U"	Advanced	Aleksandra Pobiega
Episode 14 (Saturday, November 6, 2021)	1	Sylwia Grzeszczak	Daniel Hawes	"Shotgun"	Advanced	N/A
Episode 14 (Saturday, November 6, 2021)	2	Sylwia Grzeszczak	Iga Andrzejczak	"Małe rzeczy"	Eliminated	N/A
Episode 14 (Saturday, November 6, 2021)	3	Sylwia Grzeszczak	Adrianna Rychwalska	"Ludzkie gadanie"	Eliminated	N/A
Episode 14 (Saturday, November 6, 2021)	4	Sylwia Grzeszczak	Rafał Kozik	"Another Day"	Advanced	N/A
Episode 14 (Saturday, November 6, 2021)	5	Sylwia Grzeszczak	Małgorzata Chruściel	"Turning Tables"	Eliminated	Iga Andrzejczak
Episode 14 (Saturday, November 6, 2021)	6	Sylwia Grzeszczak	Igor Kowalski	"The Blower's Daughter"	Advanced	Adrianna Rychwalska
Episode 14 (Saturday, November 6, 2021)	7	Sylwia Grzeszczak	Julia Stolpe	"Aleja gwiazd"	Advanced	Małgorzata Chruściel
Episode 14 (Saturday, November 6, 2021)	1	Marek Piekarczyk	Wiktoria Bińczyk	"Wariatka tańczy"	Eliminated	N/A
Episode 14 (Saturday, November 6, 2021)	2	Marek Piekarczyk	Karolina Charko & Piotr Lato	"Wild Horses"	Eliminated	N/A
Episode 14 (Saturday, November 6, 2021)	3	Marek Piekarczyk	Karolina Robinson	"Send My Love (To Your New Lover)"	Advanced	N/A
Episode 14 (Saturday, November 6, 2021)	4	Marek Piekarczyk	Bartosz Madej	"Like a Rolling Stone"	Advanced	N/A
Episode 14 (Saturday, November 6, 2021)	5	Marek Piekarczyk	Anna Hnatowicz-Cholewa	"Is This Love"	Advanced	Wiktoria Bińczyk
Episode 14 (Saturday, November 6, 2021)	6	Marek Piekarczyk	Dorota Kaczmarek	"Na sen"	Eliminated	—
Episode 14 (Saturday, November 6, 2021)	7	Marek Piekarczyk	Karolina Piątek	"All Right Now"	Advanced	Karolina Charko & Piotr Lato

Non-competition performance
Performer	Song
Ray Dalton	"Don't Make Me Miss You"/"In My Bones"

== Live shows ==
The Live shows began on November 13, 2021. When the teams consist of four contestants, the coach chooses from among the two contestants with the fewest votes from the viewers (who decide by sending text messages) the person who drops out of the program. Each live episode ends with the elimination of one person from each group. In the semi-final (when the team is made up of two people), each coach divides 100 points to their artists in any way they want. The same happens with the viewers' votes, and the artist with the most points added passes through to the Final.

Live shows color key
Artist was saved by public's vote
Artist was saved by his/her coach
Artist was eliminated

=== Week 1: Live round (November 13) ===
Live round results
Episode	Order	Coach	Artist	Song	Result
Episode 15 (Saturday, November 13, 2021)	1	Tomson & Baron	Wiktor Kowalski	"The Kill"	Public's vote
Episode 15 (Saturday, November 13, 2021)	2	Tomson & Baron	Elżbieta Łoboda	"Man Down"	Eliminated
Episode 15 (Saturday, November 13, 2021)	3	Tomson & Baron	Wiktor Dyduła	"Here Comes the Rain"	Public's vote
Episode 15 (Saturday, November 13, 2021)	4	Tomson & Baron	Paulina Gołębiowska	"A Change Is Gonna Come"	Coaches' choice
Episode 15 (Saturday, November 13, 2021)	1	Sylwia Grzeszczak	Igor Kowalski	"Arcade"	Coach's choice
Episode 15 (Saturday, November 13, 2021)	2	Sylwia Grzeszczak	Daniel Hawes	"Don't Worry"	Eliminated
Episode 15 (Saturday, November 13, 2021)	3	Sylwia Grzeszczak	Julia Stolpe	"Płynie w nas gorąca krew"	Public's vote
Episode 15 (Saturday, November 13, 2021)	4	Sylwia Grzeszczak	Rafał Kozik	"Everybody's Changing"	Public's vote
Episode 15 (Saturday, November 13, 2021)	1	Marek Piekarczyk	Karolina Piątek	"Zazdrość"	Eliminated
Episode 15 (Saturday, November 13, 2021)	2	Marek Piekarczyk	Anna Hnatowicz-Cholewa	"Your Love Is King"	Public's vote
Episode 15 (Saturday, November 13, 2021)	3	Marek Piekarczyk	Bartosz Madej	"Obława"	Public's vote
Episode 15 (Saturday, November 13, 2021)	4	Marek Piekarczyk	Karolina Robinson	"Be My Baby"	Coach's choice
Episode 15 (Saturday, November 13, 2021)	1	Justyna Steczkowska	Adrianna Owczarczyk & Paulina Szymlek	"Dreams"	Public's vote
Episode 15 (Saturday, November 13, 2021)	2	Justyna Steczkowska	Monika Wiśniowska-Basel	"Ocean Drive"	Coach's choice
Episode 15 (Saturday, November 13, 2021)	3	Justyna Steczkowska	Daniel Jodłowski	"Niekochanie"	Eliminated
Episode 15 (Saturday, November 13, 2021)	4	Justyna Steczkowska	Marta Burdynowicz	"I Am Changing"	Public's vote

=== Week 2: Quarter-final (November 20) ===
Quarter-final results
Episode	Order	Coach	Artist	Song	Result
Episode 16 (Saturday, November 20, 2021)	1	Justyna Steczkowska	Monika Wiśniowska-Basel	"You Don't Own Me"	Coach's choice
Episode 16 (Saturday, November 20, 2021)	2	Justyna Steczkowska	Adrianna Owczarczyk & Paulina Szymlek	"Orła Cień"	Eliminated
Episode 16 (Saturday, November 20, 2021)	3	Justyna Steczkowska	Marta Burdynowicz	"Mam tę moc"	Public's vote
Episode 16 (Saturday, November 20, 2021)	1	Sylwia Grzeszczak	Julia Stolpe	"Hi-Fi"	Coach's choice
Episode 16 (Saturday, November 20, 2021)	2	Sylwia Grzeszczak	Rafał Kozik	"Lately"	Public's vote
Episode 16 (Saturday, November 20, 2021)	3	Sylwia Grzeszczak	Igor Kowalski	"Życia mała garść"	Eliminated
Episode 16 (Saturday, November 20, 2021)	1	Marek Piekarczyk	Bartosz Madej	"Brown Eyed Girl"	Public's vote
Episode 16 (Saturday, November 20, 2021)	2	Marek Piekarczyk	Anna Hnatowicz-Cholewa	"You Gotta Be"	Eliminated
Episode 16 (Saturday, November 20, 2021)	3	Marek Piekarczyk	Karolina Robinson	"Aniołom Szepnij To"	Coach's choice
Episode 16 (Saturday, November 20, 2021)	1	Tomson & Baron	Paulina Gołębiowska	"Don't You Worry 'bout a Thing"	Coaches' choice
Episode 16 (Saturday, November 20, 2021)	2	Tomson & Baron	Wiktor Kowalski	"Cisza Jak Ta"	Eliminated
Episode 16 (Saturday, November 20, 2021)	3	Tomson & Baron	Wiktor Dyduła	"Mówią mi"	Public's vote

=== Week 3: Semi-final (November 27) ===
Coach	Order	Artist	Cover song	Original song	Points			Result
Coach	Order	Artist	Cover song	Original song	Coach	Public	Total	Result
Sylwia Grzeszczak	1	Rafał Kozik	"No Time to Die"	"Zimny front"	45%	58%	103%	Advanced
Sylwia Grzeszczak	2	Julia Stolpe	"Who Wants to Live Forever"	"Kiedy jak nie teraz"	55%	42%	97%	Eliminated
Marek Piekarczyk	1	Bartosz Madej	"Diana"	"Moje serce"	51%	71%	122%	Advanced
Marek Piekarczyk	2	Karolina Robinson	"Son of a Preacher Man"	"4 soboty (Dajcie mi spokój)"	49%	29%	78%	Eliminated
Tomson & Baron	1	Wiktor Dyduła	"Your song"	"Dobrze wiesz, że tęsknię"	49%	66%	115%	Advanced
Tomson & Baron	2	Paulina Gołębiowska	"The Greatest Love of All"	"Lepiej"	51%	34%	85%	Eliminated
Justyna Steczkowska	1	Monika Wiśniowska-Basel	"Give In To Me"	"Proste słowa"	48%	21%	69%	Eliminated
Justyna Steczkowska	2	Marta Burdynowicz	"Never Enough"	"Żaden wstyd"	52%	79%	131%	Advanced

=== Week 4: Final (December 4) ===
Order	Coach	Artist	Song		Result
1	Tomson & Baron	Wiktor Dyduła	Duet with coach	"Best of You"	Fourth place
1	Tomson & Baron	Wiktor Dyduła	English song	"Kiss from a Rose"	Fourth place
1	Tomson & Baron	Wiktor Dyduła	Polish song	—N/a	Fourth place
1	Tomson & Baron	Wiktor Dyduła	Original song	—N/a	Fourth place
2	Sylwia Grzeszczak	Rafał Kozik	Duet with coach	"You Raise Me Up"	Third place
2	Sylwia Grzeszczak	Rafał Kozik	English song	"Easy on Me"	Third place
2	Sylwia Grzeszczak	Rafał Kozik	Polish song	"Życie, och życie"	Third place
2	Sylwia Grzeszczak	Rafał Kozik	Original song	—N/a	Third place
3	Marek Piekarczyk	Bartosz Madej	Duet with coach	"Modlitwa"	Runner-up
3	Marek Piekarczyk	Bartosz Madej	English song	"To Love Somebody"	Runner-up
3	Marek Piekarczyk	Bartosz Madej	Polish song	"Kiedy mnie już nie będzie"	Runner-up
3	Marek Piekarczyk	Bartosz Madej	Original song	"Moje serce"	Runner-up
4	Justyna Steczkowska	Marta Burdynowicz	Duet with coach	"In The Arms Of The Angel"	Winner
4	Justyna Steczkowska	Marta Burdynowicz	English song	"I Will Always Love You"	Winner
4	Justyna Steczkowska	Marta Burdynowicz	Polish song	"Odkryjemy miłość nieznaną"	Winner
4	Justyna Steczkowska	Marta Burdynowicz	Original song	"Żaden wstyd"	Winner

Non-competition performances
Episode	Performers	Song
15.1	Kasia Dereń	"Do siebie"
15.2	Becky Hill	"My Heart Goes (La Di Da)"
16.2	Go_A	"Shum"
17.2	Kungs	"Never Going Home"/"Lipstick"
18.1	Sara James	"Somebody"
18.2	Krystian Ochman	"Złodzieje wyobraźni"
18.2	Matteo Bocelli	"Solo"

== Results summary of live shows ==
=== Color key ===
Artist's info

- Artist from Team Tomson & Baron
- Artist from Team Sylwia
- Artist from Team Justyna
- Artist from Team Marek

Result details

- Winner
- Runner-up
- Third place
- Fourth place
- Advanced to the finale with the most points
- Saved by his/her coach
- Saved by the public
- Eliminated

=== Overall ===
Live shows results per week
Artist	Week 1	Week 2	Week 3	Final
Marta Burdynowicz	Safe	Safe	Advanced	Winner
Bartosz Madej	Safe	Safe	Advanced	Runner-up
Rafał Kozik	Safe	Safe	Advanced	3rd place
Wiktor Dyduła	Safe	Safe	Advanced	4th place
Paulina Gołębiowska	Safe	Safe	Eliminated	Eliminated (Week 3)
Julia Stolpe	Safe	Safe	Eliminated	Eliminated (Week 3)
Monika Wiśniowska-Basel	Safe	Safe	Eliminated	Eliminated (Week 3)
Karolina Robinson	Safe	Safe	Eliminated	Eliminated (Week 3)
Adrianna Owczarczyk & Paulina Szymlek	Safe	Eliminated	Eliminated (Week 2)	
Igor Kowalski	Safe	Eliminated	Eliminated (Week 2)	
Anna Hnatowicz-Cholewa	Safe	Eliminated	Eliminated (Week 2)	
Wiktor Kowalski	Safe	Eliminated	Eliminated (Week 2)	
Elżbieta Łoboda	Eliminated	Eliminated (Week 1)		
Daniel Hawes	Eliminated	Eliminated (Week 1)		
Karolina Piątek	Eliminated	Eliminated (Week 1)		
Daniel Jodłowski	Eliminated	Eliminated (Week 1)		

=== Per team ===
Live shows results per week
Artist	Week 1	Week 2	Week 3	Final
Rafał Kozik	Public's vote	Public's vote	Advanced	Third place
Julia Stolpe	Public's vote	Coach's choice	Eliminated	
Igor Kowalski	Coach's choice	Eliminated		
Daniel Hawes	Eliminated			
Wiktor Dyduła	Public's vote	Public's vote	Advanced	Fourth place
Paulina Gołębiowska	Coach's choice	Coach's choice	Eliminated	
Wiktor Kowalski	Public's vote	Eliminated		
Elżbieta Łoboda	Eliminated			
Marta Burdynowicz	Public's vote	Public's vote	Advanced	Winner
Monika Wiśniowska-Basel	Coach's choice	Coach's choice	Eliminated	
Adrianna Owczarczyk & Paulina Szymlek	Public's vote	Eliminated		
Daniel Jodłowski	Eliminated			
Bartosz Madej	Public's vote	Public's vote	Advanced	Runner-up
Karolina Robinson	Coach's choice	Coach's choice	Eliminated	
Anna Hnatowicz-Cholewa	Public's vote	Eliminated		
Karolina Piątek	Eliminated			
