= List of number-one dance singles of 2011 (Poland) =

This is a list of the number-one singles on the Polish Top – Dyskoteki chart in 2011, ranking the most-played songs in nightclubs across Poland. It was compiled by DJ Promotion and published by the Polish Society of the Phonographic Industry (ZPAV). It was published biweekly, with the exception of May, August and September, when only one issue a month was published, and November and December, when it was not available at all.

== List of number ones ==
Issue date	Song	Artist(s)	Source
January 1	"Only Girl (In the World)"	Rihanna	
January 16	"Only Girl (In the World)"	Rihanna	
February 1	"Only Girl (In the World)"	Rihanna	
February 16	"Only Girl (In the World)"	Rihanna	
March 1	"Only Girl (In the World)"	Rihanna	
March 16	"Take Over Control"	Afrojack featuring Eva Simons	
April 1	"Take Over Control"	Afrojack featuring Eva Simons	
April 16	"Losing Control"	The Nycer featuring Deeci	
May 16	"On the Floor"	Jennifer Lopez featuring Pitbull	
June 1	"On the Floor"	Jennifer Lopez featuring Pitbull	
June 16	"Loca People"	Sak Noel	
July 1	"Loca People"	Sak Noel	
July 16	"Loca People"	Sak Noel	
August 1	"Loca People"	Sak Noel	
September 16	"Welcome to St. Tropez"	DJ Antoine vs. Timati featuring Kalenna	
October 1	"Welcome to St. Tropez"	DJ Antoine vs. Timati featuring Kalenna	
October 16	"Rain Over Me"	Pitbull featuring Marc Anthony	

== See also ==
- List of number-one singles of 2011 (Poland)
- List of number-one albums of 2011 (Poland)
