= List of number-one singles of 2011 (Poland) =

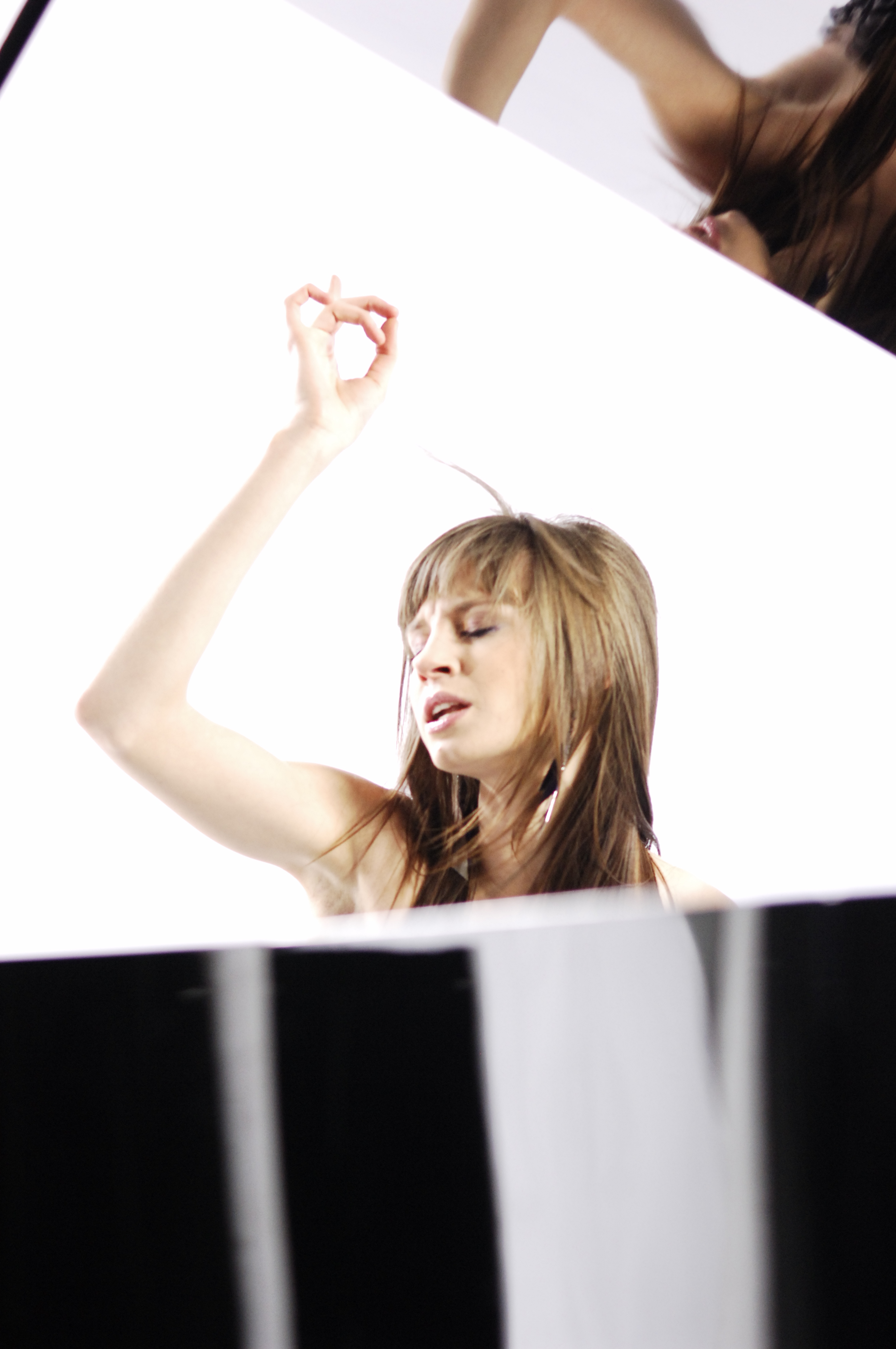
Sylwia Grzeszczak's "Małe rzeczy" became the longest running number-one single of the 2010s on the Polish Singles Chart, in which spent a total of eight consecutive weeks a top the chart.

This is a list of the songs that reached number-one position in official Polish single chart in ZPAV in 2011. There was a total of 19 number-one singles in 2011.

In 2011, fifteen artists gained their first number-one single in Poland either as a lead or featured act: Duck Sauce, Andrzej Piaseczny, Nelly, Ewa Farna, Bruno Mars, The Black Eyed Peas, Blue Café, Sylwia Grzeszczak, Zakopower, Adele, Maroon 5, Christina Aguilera, Olly Murs, Rizzle Kicks and Foster the People.

In 2011, Lady Gaga, Katy Perry, Adele and Sylwia Grzeszczak each scored their second number-one singles in Poland. Rihanna also scored her fourth number-one single in Poland. Sylwia Grzeszczak's "Małe rzeczy" was the longest-running number-one single of the year, with each single scoring eight consecutive weeks at the top.

== Chart history ==
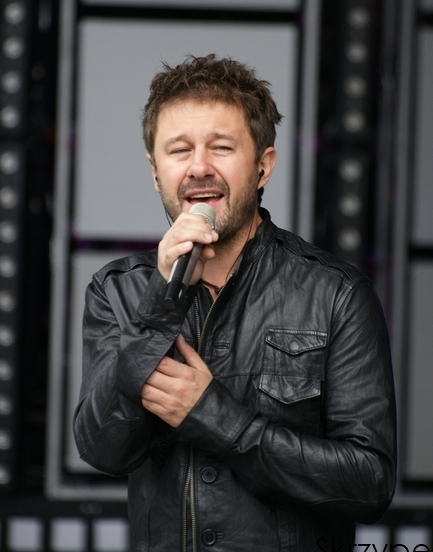
Andrzej Piaseczny's "Śniadanie do łóżka" was the first single in Polish which was a number-one single in Poland, with each single scoring two consecutive weeks at the top.

Issue date	Song	Artist(s)	Reference(s)
1 January	"Barbra Streisand"	Duck Sauce	
8 January	"Śniadanie do łóżka"	Andrzej Piaseczny	
15 January	"Śniadanie do łóżka"	Andrzej Piaseczny	
22 January	"Just a Dream"	Nelly	
29 January	"Just a Dream"	Nelly	
5 February	"Ewakuacja"	Ewa Farna	
12 February	"Just a Dream"	Nelly	
19 February	"Ewakuacja"	Ewa Farna	
26 February	"Ewakuacja"	Ewa Farna	
5 March	"Grenade"	Bruno Mars	
12 March	"Grenade"	Bruno Mars	
19 March	"Grenade"	Bruno Mars	
26 March	"Grenade"	Bruno Mars	
2 April	"Born This Way"	Lady Gaga	
9 April	"Born This Way"	Lady Gaga	
16 April	"Born This Way"	Lady Gaga	
23 April	"S&M"	Rihanna	
30 April	"S&M"	Rihanna	
7 May	"Just Can't Get Enough"	The Black Eyed Peas	
14 May	"E.T."	Katy Perry	
21 May	"Buena"	Blue Café	
28 May	"Buena"	Blue Café	
4 June	"Buena"	Blue Café	
11 June	"Buena"	Blue Café	
18 June	"Małe rzeczy"	Sylwia Grzeszczak	
25 June	"Małe rzeczy"	Sylwia Grzeszczak	
2 July	"Małe rzeczy"	Sylwia Grzeszczak	
9 July	"Małe rzeczy"	Sylwia Grzeszczak	
16 July	"Małe rzeczy"	Sylwia Grzeszczak	
23 July	"Małe rzeczy"	Sylwia Grzeszczak	
30 July	"Małe rzeczy"	Sylwia Grzeszczak	
6 August	"Małe rzeczy"	Sylwia Grzeszczak	
13 August	"California King Bed"	Rihanna	
20 August	"Boso"	Zakopower	
27 August	"Set Fire to the Rain"	Adele	
3 September	"Set Fire to the Rain"	Adele	
10 September	"Set Fire to the Rain"	Adele	
17 September	"Set Fire to the Rain"	Adele	
24 September	"Moves like Jagger"	Maroon 5 featuring Christina Aguilera	
1 October	"Moves like Jagger"	Maroon 5 featuring Christina Aguilera	
8 October	"Sen o przyszłości"	Sylwia Grzeszczak	
15 October	"Sen o przyszłości"	Sylwia Grzeszczak	
22 October	"Moves like Jagger"	Maroon 5 featuring Christina Aguilera	
29 October	"Moves like Jagger"	Maroon 5 featuring Christina Aguilera	
5 November	"Moves like Jagger"	Maroon 5 featuring Christina Aguilera	
12 November	"Moves like Jagger"	Maroon 5 featuring Christina Aguilera	
19 November	"Heart Skips a Beat"	Olly Murs featuring Rizzle Kicks	
26 November	"Heart Skips a Beat"	Olly Murs featuring Rizzle Kicks	
3 December	"Pumped Up Kicks"	Foster the People	
10 December	"Someone like You"	Adele	
24 December	"Someone like You"	Adele	
31 December	"Pumped Up Kicks"	Foster the People	

== Number-one artists ==
Position	Artist	Weeks at #1
1	Sylwia Grzeszczak	10
2	Maroon 5	6
2	Christina Aguilera	6
3	Adele	5
4	Bruno Mars	4
4	Blue Café	4
5	Lady Gaga	3
5	Ewa Farna	
5	Nelly	
5	Rihanna	
6	Andrzej Piaseczny	2
6	Foster the People	2
6	Olly Murs	2
Rizzle Kicks
7	Duck Sauce	1
7	Katy Perry	1
7	The Black Eyed Peas	1
7	Zakopower	1

== See also ==
- List of number-one dance singles of 2011 (Poland)
- List of number-one albums of 2011 (Poland)
