= List of number-one albums of 2011 (Poland) =

These are the Polish number one albums of 2011, per the OLiS Chart.

== Chart history ==
Issue Date	Album	Artist(s)	Reference(s)
January 3	MTV Unplugged Kult	Kult	
January 10	Szanuj	Star Guard Muffin	
January 17	The Fame	Lady Gaga	
January 24	Picking Up the Pieces	Aga Zaryan	
January 31	MTV Unplugged Kult	Kult	
February 7	MTV Unplugged Kult	Kult	
February 14	MTV Unplugged Kult	Kult	
February 21	Songs of Love	Simply Red	
February 28	Jak tam jest	Seweryn Krajewski	
March 7	Jak tam jest	Seweryn Krajewski	
March 14	Reedukacja	Peja, Slums Attack	
March 21	Reedukacja	Peja, Slums Attack	
March 28	Jak tam jest	Seweryn Krajewski	
April 4	Soldier of Love	Sade	
April 11	Soldier of Love	Sade	
April 18	Soldier of Love	Sade	
April 26	Solidarni z Japonią	Różni wykonawcy	
May 2	Solidarni z Japonią	Różni wykonawcy	
May 9	Solidarni z Japonią	Różni wykonawcy	
May 16	Solidarni z Japonią	Różni wykonawcy	
May 23	Solidarni z Japonią	Różni wykonawcy	
May 30	Solidarni z Japonią	Różni wykonawcy	
June 6	The Best Kids... Ever! 1 CD	Różni wykonawcy	
June 13	Nieważne, jak wysoko jesteśmy...	Myslovitz	
June 20	Symphonicities	Sting	
June 27	Boso	Zakopower	
July 4	Maraton	Lady Pank	
July 11	Komeda	Leszek Możdżer	
July 18	Szanuj	Star Guard Muffin	
July 25	Boso	Zakopower	
August 1	Boso	Zakopower	
August 8	Boso	Zakopower	
August 16	Back to Black	Amy Winehouse	
August 22	Boso	Zakopower	
August 29	Boso	Zakopower	
September 5	I Am... Sasha Fierce	Beyoncé	
September 12	I'm with You	Red Hot Chili Peppers	
September 19	The Singles	Dżem	
September 26	The Singles	Dżem	
October 3	8	Nosowska	
October 10	8	Nosowska	
October 17	8	Nosowska	
October 24	Sen o przyszłości	Sylwia Grzeszczak	
October 31	Czerwony album	Coma	
November 7	Mylo Xyloto	Coldplay	
November 14	21	Adele	
November 21	21	Adele	
November 28	21	Adele	
December 5	21	Adele	
December 12	Bar la Curva / Plamy na słońcu	Kazik Na Żywo	
December 19	21	Adele	
December 27	My Christmas	Andrea Bocelli	

== See also ==
- List of number-one singles of 2011 (Poland)
