= Sen o przyszłości =

Studio album by Sylwia Grzeszczak
- Released: 11 October 2011
- Recorded: 2011
- Genre: Pop
- Length: 38:24
- Label: EMI Music Poland
- Producer: Liber, Sylwia Grzeszczak

Sylwia Grzeszczak chronology
Ona i On (2008)	Sen o przyszłości (2011)	Komponując siebie (2013)

Singles from Sen o przyszłości
- 1. "Małe rzeczy" Released: 17 June 2011; 2. "Sen o przyszłości" Released: 30 August 2011; 3. "Karuzela" Released: 4 January 2012

Sen o przyszłości is the second studio album by Polish singer-songwriter Sylwia Grzeszczak, released on 11 October 2011 under EMI Music Poland. Production for the album took place through 2011, with Polish rapper Liber and Grzesczak herself serving as the producers. It consists of 11 songs, including one in Russian language. Two singles preceded the album: "Małe rzeczy" and "Sen o przyszłości". A third single, "Karuzela", was released on 4 January 2012.

Less than two weeks after its premiere, the album became platinum.

== Track listing ==
No.	Title	Lyrics	Music	Length
1.	"Sen o przyszłości"	Sylwia Grzeszczak, Marcin Piotrowski	Grzeszczak	3:19
2.	"Leć"	Grzeszczak, Piotrowski	Grzeszczak	3:07
3.	"Karuzela"	Piotrowski	Bartosz Zielony	3:17
4.	"Bajka"	Piotrowski	Grzeszczak	3:47
5.	"Tęcza"	Kuba Mańkowski	Grzeszczak	3:46
6.	"Nie dam się"	Grzeszczak	Grzeszczak	3:10
7.	"Imię trawy"	Jacek Cygan	Grzeszczak	3:19
8.	"Małe rzeczy"	Piotrowski	Grzeszczak	3:17
9.	"Najprzytulniej"	Grzeszczak, Piotrowski	Grzeszczak	3:25
10.	"Gorszy dzień"	Mańkowski	Zielony	4:31
11.	"За тобой"	Бьянка	Бьянка	3:26
Total length:				38:24

== Charts and certifications ==
=== Weekly charts ===
Chart (2011–2012)	Peak position
Polish Albums (ZPAV)	1

=== Certifications ===
Region	Certification	Certified units/sales
Poland (ZPAV)	2× Platinum	60,000^{*}
^{*} Sales figures based on certification alone.
