= Małe rzeczy =

Single by Sylwia Grzeszczak

from the album Sen o przyszłości
- Released: June 17, 2011
- Recorded: 2011
- Genre: Pop, polish music
- Length: 3:12
- Label: EMI Music Polska
- Songwriters: Sylwia Grzeszczak, Liber

Sylwia Grzeszczak singles chronology
"Mijamy się" (2009)	"Małe rzeczy" (2011)	"Sen o przyszłości" (2011)

Music video
- "Małe Rzeczy" on YouTube

"Małe rzeczy" (eng. Little Things) is the first single from Sylwia Grzeszczak's debut album Sen o przyszłości, released on 17 June 2011. 31 May 2011 the song debuted at RMF FM on 19th place and remained on the list for 13 weeks. The single quickly became a hit, and for eight weeks in a row was the most frequently played song in Polish radio stations, while the video was number one on the Polish Video Chart. The song also gave Sylwia success in the competition "Koncert Lata Radia Zet i TVP2".

== Music video ==
The music video filmed June 2011. It shows the palace in Moszna, while many scenes were filmed in the Cistercian monastery in Lubiaz. The video was created by Group 13 and was viewed more than 10 million times.

== Live performance ==
17 July 2011, Sylwia sang the song at the "Hity Na Czasie" concert in Inowrocław.

== Track listing ==
Digital download
No.	Title	Length
1.	"Male rzeczy"	3:12

== Charts ==
=== Weekly charts ===
Chart (2011)	Peak position
Poland Airplay (ZPAV)	1
Poland (Video Chart)	1

=== Year-end charts ===
Chart (2012)	Peak position
Poland (ZPAV)	28

== See also ==
- List of number-one singles of 2011 (Poland)
