= Sylwia Grzeszczak =

Polish singer-songwriter and pianist (born 1989)

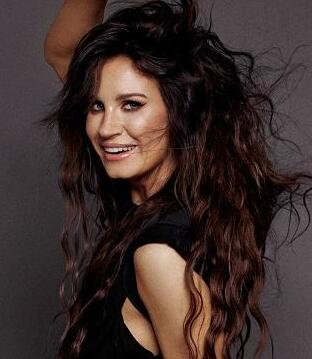
- Sylwia Grzeszczak (2021)
- Born: 7 April 1989 (age 37); Poznań, Poland
- Occupations: Singer, composer, songwriter
- Years active: 2004-present
- Spouse: Marcin "Liber" Piotrowski (married 2014–2023)
- Children: 1
- Musical career
- Genres: Pop, R&B, Soul
- Instrument: Piano
- Years active: 2004–present
- Labels: My Music, Gorgo Music
- Website: sylwiagrzeszczak.pl

Sylwia Karolina Grzeszczak (born 7 April 1989) is a Polish singer-songwriter, compositor and pianist.

She debuted in 2008 with the album Ona i On, which she recorded with Liber. Afterwards, she released three solo albums: Sen o przyszłości (2011), Komponując siebie (2013) and Tamta dziewczyna (2016). The first two achieved triple platinum, whereas the third achieved a double platinum.

Most singles released by Grzeszczak became hits. "Małe rzeczy", "Sen o przyszłości", "Pożyczony", "Księżniczka", "Tamta dziewczyna", "Motyle" and "Och i ach" all achieved number one on the AirPlay list.

== Biography ==
Her father was a plane mechanic. She has a brother, Mateusz, who is four years her senior and became her tour manager. In 1995, she participated in the program Od przedszkola do Opola, in which she performed "Byle było tak", a song from the discography of Krzysztof Krawczyk. She attended the H. Wieniawski National Music School in Łódź and the M. Karłowicz General Music School in Poznań. She also graduated the Frederic Chopin National Music School in Poznań in the fortepiano class.

In 2004, she took first place in the final of the Drzwi do kariery competition. In 2005, she took part in the fourth edition of Polsat's Idol, ending in the group stage. She won a sung poetry competition for composing music for an Ernest Bryll poem. In 2006, she recorded three songs for Ascetoholix's album, Adsum – "Tak wyszło", "Afrodyzjak" and "Chodź ze mną". In 2007, she collaborated with Agnieszka Włodarczyk on her debut album Nie dla oka.... Along with Liber, she took part in the "Gwiazdy na Warmii i Mazurach" concert tour, with a guest appearance from Doniu. Also with Liber, she recorded her debut album, Ona i on, which debuted on 21 November 2008. The album was promoted by the singles "Nowe szanse", "Co z nami będzie" and "Mijamy się".

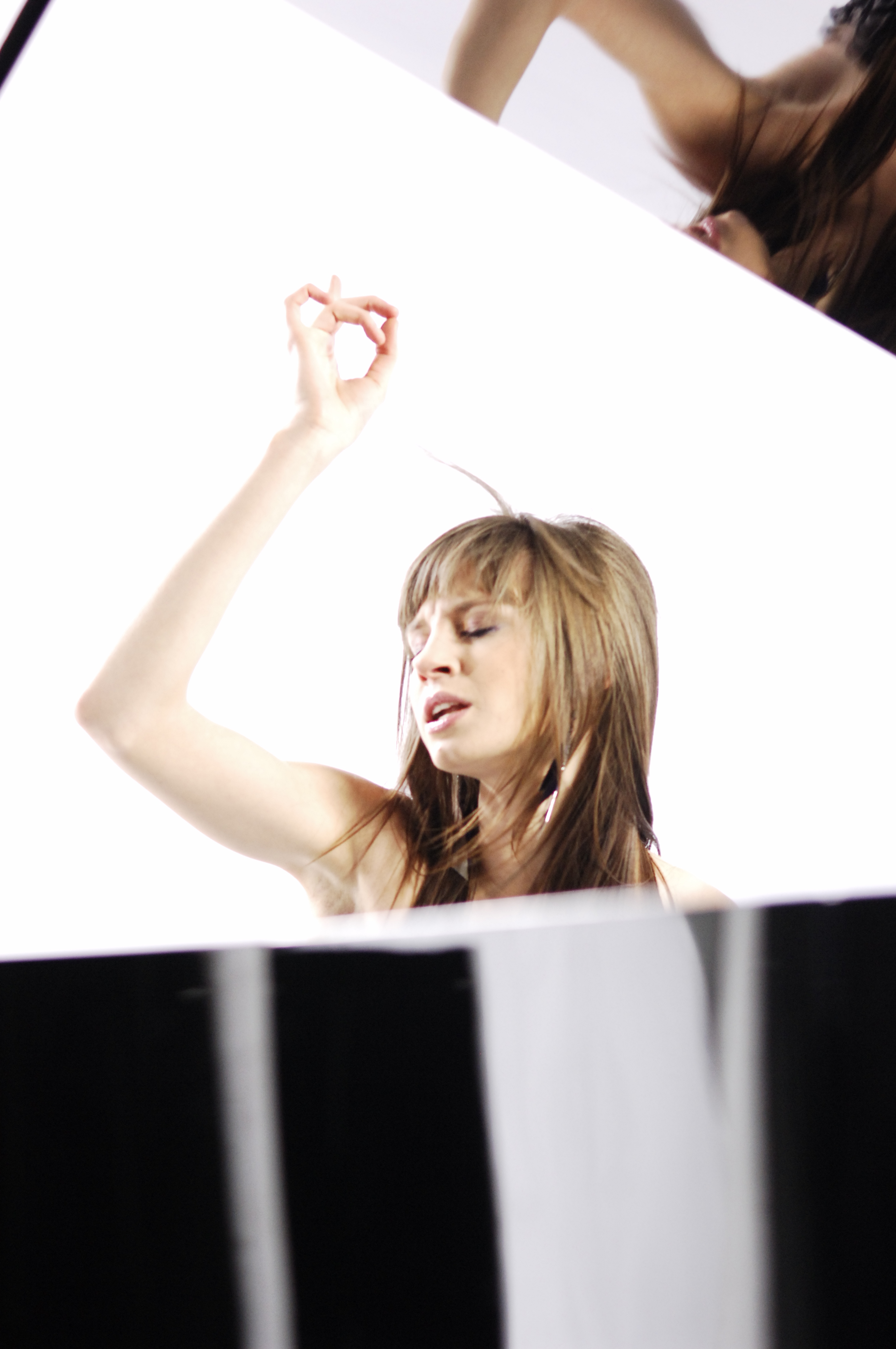
Grzeszczak (2009)

In 2011 she released her first solo single, "Małe rzeczy" which reached first place on, among others, the AirPlay and AirPlay - TV chart. She also composed the hymn for the Warta Poznań sports club. On 4 July during the Lato ZET i Dwójki organized by Radio ZET and TVP2, the singer won the competition for the best song with her newly released single. On 16 July she performed at the Russian Music Festival in Zielona Góra. There, she performed "За тобой" (Za toboy) and secured third place, winning a bronze samovar. In August, she released her second solo single, "Sen o przyszłości". The track reached, among others, first place in the AirPlay chart. The music video for her track "Muzyki moc", which she recorded in 2010 with several others got the Viva Comet 2011 award for "Best on VIVA-TV.pl". on 11 October, she released the album Sen o przyszłości; the same title as her preceding single. This album reached first place on the OLiS chart. On 16 October she performed as the musical guest in the second semifinal of the second edition of Must Be the Music.

On 4 January 2012, she released the single "Karuzela". In March, she got the certificate of double platinum for her album Sen o przyszłości. On 24 April, during the Fryderyki 2012 awards gala, she received a special award for "Song with most airplay" from Nielsen Music for her song, "Małe rzeczy".

On 8 March 2013, Grzeszczak released the single "Flirt", with which she announced her upcoming album "Komponując siebie", released 11 June the same year. The album charted in the top 10 of the OLiS chart for 16 weeks straight and peaked at number two. On 5 June the second single from this album, "Pożyczony", premiered. Three days later, Grzeszczak performed "Flirt" on the "Biggest Hits of the Year" concert during the TOPtrendy 2013 festival in Sopot. On 15 June, Grzeszczak was honored with a SuperNagroda during the Superjedynki at the L National Festival of Polish Music in Opole. On 3 August at the Eska Music Awards 2013 gala in Szczecin, she received the "best artist" award. On 24 August, she performed on the "5 Years with Muzodajnia. Biggest Hits of the Summer" concert during the second day of Top of the Top Sopot Festival 2013. There, she received a golden record for Komponując siebie and a special award for "Małe rzeczy", which had sold the most copies of any track in the five-year history of Muzodajnia.pl. 27 August marks the radio debut of "Księżniczka", the third single from Komponując siebie. In December, Grzeszczak begun her Sylwia Grzeszczak z zespołem concert tour which covered performances in seven of the biggest concert halls in Poland, such as the Łucznikczka Hall in Bydgoszcz, Dębowiec Sports Arena in Bielsko-Biała, Entertainment and Sports Hall in Koszalin, Torwar Hall in Warsaw, House of Music and Dance in Zabrze, Centennial Hall in Wrocław and Hala Arena in Poznań. Lasting from December to March, the tour was videotaped by Eska TV.

In February 2014, Grzeszczak was nominated for a music star's Wiktor award. She composed "Czarne chmury" for Liber and Mateusz Grędziński. On 30 May 2014 she performed at the "TOP" concert during the first day of TOPtrendy 2014 along ten artists with the highest number of sold albums the previous year in Poland, and secured third place. The next day, she won the "Biggest Hits of the Year" competition with "Księżniczka". On 6 June she sang "Szczęśliwej drogi już czas" with Ryszard Rynkowski at the LI National Festival of Polish Music in Opole. The day after she received a Superjedynka for "SuperArtist". She was also nominated for SuperAlbum (for Komponując siebie) and SuperPrzebój (SuperHit, for "Księżniczka"). On 24 July, her album Komponując siebie achieved double platinum status after selling 60 thousand units. On 22 August she received her seventh Eska Music Award, claiming the new record for most awards received. The following day she took part in the Polsat Sopot Festival Słowik Publiczności competition with "Księżniczka".

In February 2015 she took 12th place in a RMF FM poll for the artist of the quarter century. Also in February, she received a Telekamera in the Music category. On 19 April she performed at Wembley Arena during Top Music Wembley. On 29 May, thanks to receiving double platinum for Komponując siebie, she performed on the "Platinum concert" during the first day of Polsat SuperHit Festival in Sopot. On 12 July she performed during the summer concert tour Lato Zet i Dwójki 2015 where she won the audience vote for Hit of the Concert. In that timeframe, she composed the soundtrack for 7 rzeczy, których nie wiecie o facetach; from it, the single "7 rzeczy" (performed by Liber and Mateusz Ziółko) became a radio hit.

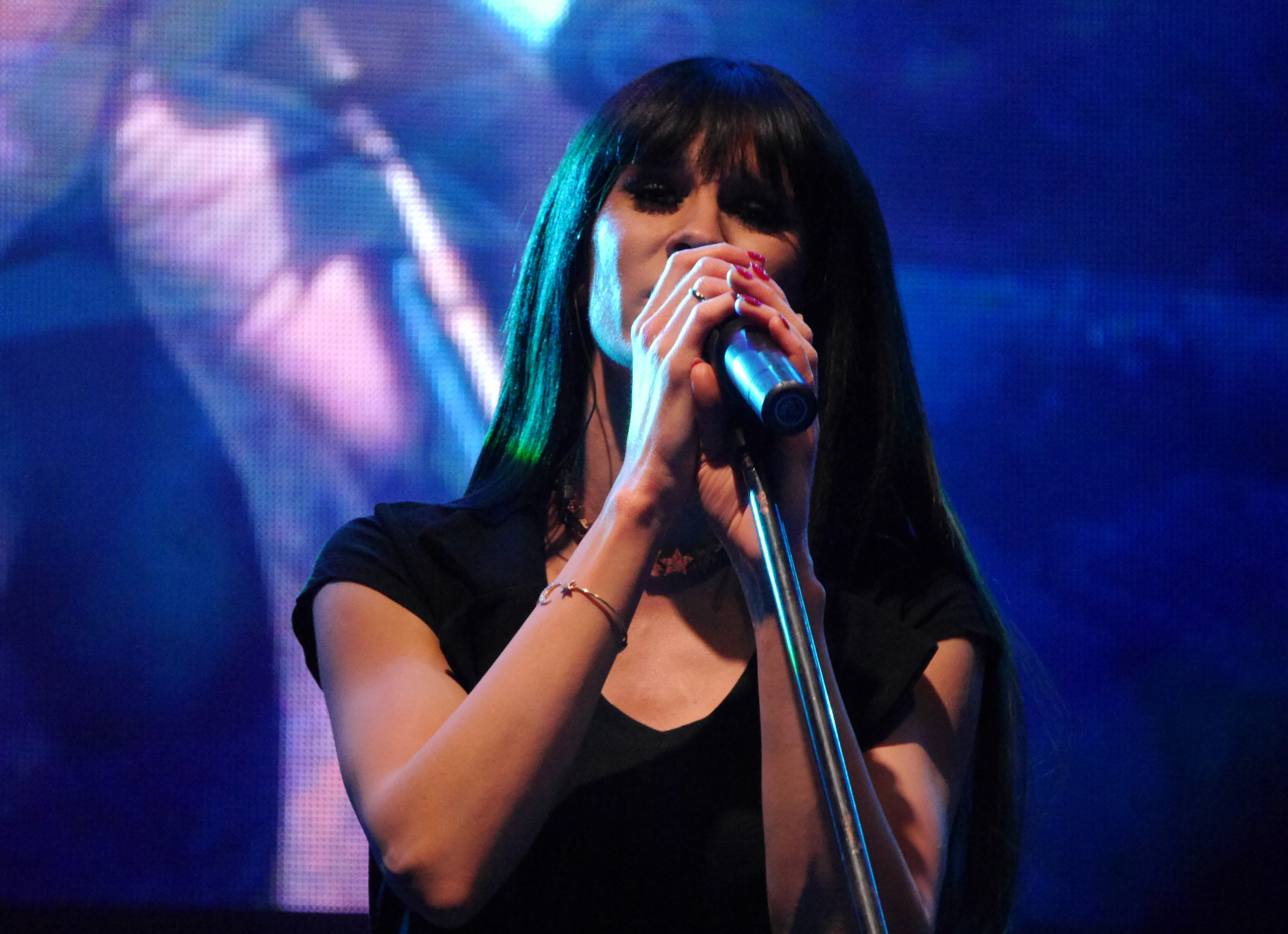
Grzeszczak during a concert in Wrocław (2016)

On 6 April 2016, Sen o przyszłości and Komponując siebie achieved triple platinum status. On 20 May 2016 her single "Tamta dziewczyna" debuted on RMF FM. Grzeszczak performed this single a week later during the Polsat SuperHit Festival "Platinum concert". The track reached the top of the AirPlay Top chart, where it stayed for six weeks straight. The music video for the song became the most popular video clip in Poland in 2016 - it garnered over 110 million views. The single sold over 200 thousand digital copies, which helped it reach double diamond record status. On 26 August, Grzeszczak performed at the Eska Music Awards 2016 gala, where she received a trophy for Best Artist and Best Video ("Tamta dziewczyna"). Two days later she performed at the "Magical End of Vacation" Festival, where she won the RMF FM and Polsat Hit of the Summer competition with "Tamta dziewczyna". On 9 November, Grzeszczak released "Bezdroża", a single featuring Mateusz Ziółko. On 25 November, she released the album Tamta dziewczyna, which received a golden record award on the day of the premiere, a platinum record less than three weeks later, and double platinum after that. Prior to the release of the album, Grzeszczak embarked on the Tamta dziewczyna Tour, performing at 20 of the biggest concert halls.

In May 2017, she performed at the Polsat SuperHit Festival 2017 in Sopot – on day one during the "Platinum concert" and day two during the "Radio Hit of the Year", where "Tamta dziewczyna" took third place with 10 thousand airplays the year prior.

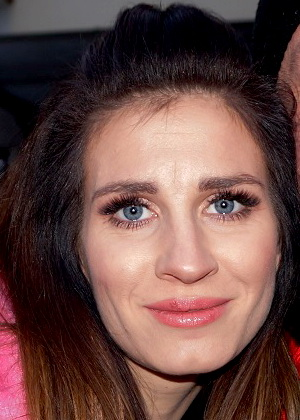
Grzeszczak (2018)

In 2018, Grzeszczak celebrated her 10-year music career anniversary. On 11 May she released the single "Dobre myśli", featuring Liber, as part of the celebrations. Also in May, she performed at the 2018 Polsat SuperHit Festival, where during the recital of "Tamta dziewczyna ma jubileusz" she performed her biggest hits and was awarded a Słowik Publiczności. In October, she embarked on the Ten Tour concert tour, performing at the biggest concert halls in Poland.

In January 2019, she performed at the 90-year anniversary of Polish volleyball. Grzeszczak continued her Ten Tour throughout the first half of the year, which she finished with concerts in Płock Amphitheatre and Millenium Amphitheatre in Opole. During her concert on Ergo Arena in Gdańsk, she celebrated her 30th birthday and recorded her first ever concert DVD. On 30 April, she performed at the National Stadium in Warsaw during the "Gramy dla Europy" concert. On 14 June, she was awarded an award from TVP1 during her performance at the LVI National Festival of Polish Music in Opole "Od Opola do Opola" concert. In August, she released the single "Rakiety", and Uwaga! aired a program about the behind the scenes of her career. On 14 August she appeared at the Top Of The Top Sopot Festival, where she performed a medley of her hits, and for the first time publicly sang her latest single. Her performance was discussed heavily online, because Grzeszczak began it by descending from the roof of the Forest Opera in Sopot. Grzeszczak continued to perform at concerts in 2019.

In 2020, for the first time, Grzeszczak did not embark on a concert tour due to the COVID-19 pandemic in Poland. On 23 October she performed as guest star in the final of the 11th edition of Dancing with the Stars. Taniec z gwiazdami, and on 31 December during the New Year's Eve concert Sylwestrowa Moc Przebojów Polsatu.

On 9 April 2021, Grzeszczak released the single "Prawda o nas", which she performed eight days later during a guest appearance on the final of the fourth The Voice Kids on TVP2. On 30 May, Grzeszczak performed on the TVP1 Jak przeżyć wszystko jeszcze raz concert in tribute of Krzysztof Krawczyk, performing "Pamiętam ciebie z tamtych lat" and "Byle było tak". On 25 June, she performed with Jamala during the European Culture Stadium festival in Rzeszów. In August, she performed at: Wakacyjne hity wszech czasów (TVP3 and Trójka), #Nasze20lecie at Top of the Top Sopot Festival 2021 (TVN), Earth Festival (Polsat), and took part in the Przebój lata RMF FM i Polsatu competition in Kielce with "Prawda o nas". On 3 September, Grzeszczak performed at the LVIII NFPM in Opole "Od Opola do Opola: Największe gwiazdy! Legendarne przeboje!" concert. Throughout 2021, she was a coach on the 12th edition of The Voice of Poland.

On 25 February 2022, Grzeszczak released the single "Dżungla". In spring, she became the ambassador for Deichmann until autumn 2023. On 21 May, she performed at the Polsat SuperHit Festival 2022 "Radio Hit of the Year" concert. On 13 September, Grzeszczak released the single "O nich, o Tobie", with which she promoted the documentary Ania about Anna Przybylska.

On 25 May 2023, Grzeszczak performed as a guest star at the 26th Telekamera gala. In July, she released the single "Bang Bang", and in August she performed at the Top of the Top Sopot Festival 2023 and the "Przebój lata Radia ZET i Polsatu" concert in Kielce.

In January 2024, she released the single "Motyle" and took part in an ad campaign for Radio ZET, while in May 2024 she debuted the single "Och i Ach". In August, Grzeszczak performed at the Top of the Top Sopot Festival 2024 "Sopot Night Fever" concert and released the single "Połowa mnie", recorded in duet with Smolasty. November marks the premiere of "Latawce", and December marks Grzeszczak's second ad campaign for Radio ZET.

In June 2025, Grzeszczak released the single "Słowa na K".

== Private life ==
On 28 July 2014, Grzeszczak married Marcin "Liber" Piotrowski, and mutually announced their divorce on 20 September 2023. They have a daughter, Bogna (b. 5 December 2015). From 2024, she has been engaged to Maciej Buzała.

== Discography ==
=== Studio albums ===
Title	Album details	Peak chart positions	Certifications	Sales
Title	Album details	POL	Certifications	Sales
Ona i on (with Liber)	Released: 21 November 2008; Label: My Music, Universal Music Polska; Formats: CD, digital download	27		
Sen o przyszłości	Released: 11 October 2011; Label: Pomaton EMI, Gorgo Music; Formats: CD, digital download	1	ZPAV: 3× Platinum	POL: 90,000
Komponując siebie	Released: 11 June 2013; Label: Pomaton EMI, Gorgo Music; Formats: CD, digital download	2	ZPAV: 3× Platinum	POL: 90,000
Tamta dziewczyna	Released: 25 November 2016; Label: Warner Music Poland, Gorgo Music; Formats: CD, digital download	3	ZPAV: 2× Platinum	POL: 60,000

=== Singles ===
Title	Year	Peak chart positions			Certifications	Album
Title	Year	POL Air.	POL Stream.	POL Billb.	Certifications	Album
"Nowe szanse" (with Liber)	2008	—	*			Ona i on
"Co z nami będzie" (with Liber)	2008	5	*			Ona i on
"Mijamy się" (with Liber)	2009	—	*			Ona i on
"Małe rzeczy"	2011	1	*			Sen o przyszłości
"Sen o przyszłości"	2011	1	*			Sen o przyszłości
"Karuzela"	2012	2	*			Sen o przyszłości
"Flirt"	2013	3	*			Komponując siebie
"Pożyczony"	2013	1	*			Komponując siebie
"Księżniczka"	2013	1	*			Komponując siebie
"Nowy ty, nowa ja"	2014	7	*			Komponując siebie
"Kiedy tylko spojrzę" (featuring Sound'n'Grace)	2015	—	*		ZPAV: 2× Platinum	Komponując siebie
"Tamta dziewczyna"	2016	1	*		ZPAV: 2× Diamond	Tamta dziewczyna
"Bezdroża" (featuring Mateusz Ziółko)	2016	53	*		ZPAV: Diamond	Tamta dziewczyna
"Dobre myśli" (with Liber)	2018	5	*		ZPAV: 2× Platinum	Non-album single
"Rakiety"	2019	17	*			Non-album single
"Prawda o nas"	2021	10	*		ZPAV: Platinum	Non-album single
"Dżungla"	2022	22	*	—	ZPAV: Gold	TBA
"O nich, o Tobie"	2022	3	92	—	ZPAV: 3× Platinum	Ania
"Bang Bang"	2023	6	—	—	ZPAV: Platinum	TBA
"Motyle"	2024	1	5	4	ZPAV: Diamond	TBA
"Och i ach"	2024	1	1	2	ZPAV: Diamond	TBA
"Połowa mnie" (with Smolasty)	2024	23	24	—		Non-album single
"Latawce"	2024	5	59	—	ZPAV: Platinum	TBA
"Słowa na K"	2025	5	—	—	ZPAV: Gold	TBA
"Mango"	2026	2	—	—		TBA
"Następny proszę..."	2026	—	—	—		TBA
"—" denotes items which were not released in that country or failed to chart. "*" denotes the chart did not exist at that time.

==== As featured artist ====
Title	Year	Album
"Muzyki moc" (as a part of VIVA and Friends)	2010	VIVA 10 lat
"Masz dar" (as a part of Drużyna Szpiku)	2010	Non-album single
"Kiedy tracisz przyjaciela" (as a part of Team and Friends)	2011	Non-album single
"Naucz się kochać" (as a part of Kościkiewicz and Friends)	2011	Non-album single

== Awards and nominations ==
Year	Ceremony	Nominated work	Category	Result
2008	Sopot Hit Festival	"Nowe szanse" (with Liber)	Polish Summer Hit	9th
2009	Mikrofony Popcornu	"Co z nami będzie?" (with Liber)	Hit of the Year – Poland	Won
2009	Eska Music Awards	Sylwia Grzeszczak	Female Artist of the Year	Won
2009	Eska Music Awards	Sylwia Grzeszczak	Radio Debut of the Year	Nominated
2009	Eska Music Awards	Ona i on (with Liber)	Album of the Year	Won
2009	Superjedynki	"Co z nami będzie?" (with Liber)	Hit of the Year	Nominated
2009	Superjedynki	Ona i on (with Liber)	Album of the Year	Nominated
2010	VIVA Comet Awards	Sylwia Grzeszczak	Debut of the Year	Nominated
2010	VIVA Comet Awards	"Co z nami będzie?" (with Liber)	Charts Award	Nominated
2011	VIVA Comet Awards	"Muzyki Moc" (VIVA & Friends)	Best on VIVA-TV.pl	Won
2011	Koncert Lata Zet i Dwójki	"Małe rzeczy"	Best Single	Won
2011	Russian Song Festival	"Za toboy"	Competition for the Golden Samovar	3rd
2011	OGAE Video Contest	"Małe rzeczy"	Music Video	8th
2011	OGAE Video Contest	"Muzyki Moc" (VIVA & Friends)	Music Video	Nominated
2011	RMF FM Plebiscite	"Małe rzeczy"	Hit of the Year	2nd
2011	RMF FM Plebiscite	"Sen o przyszłości"	Hit of the Year	8th
2012	VIVA Comet Awards	"Małe rzeczy"	Best Ringtone	Nominated
2012	VIVA Comet Awards	"Małe rzeczy"	Best Single	Won
2012	VIVA Comet Awards	Sen o przyszłości	Best Album	Nominated
2012	TOPtrendy	Sen o przyszłości	Best Selling Album	6th
2012	Superjedynki	Sen o przyszłości	Album of the Year	Won
2012	Superjedynki	Sylwia Grzeszczak	SuperArtist	Won
2012	Superjedynki	"Małe rzeczy"	SuperHit	Nominated
2012	ESKA Music Awards	Sylwia Grzeszczak	Best Female Artist	Won
2012	ESKA Music Awards	Sen o przyszłości	Best Album	Won
2012	ESKA Music Awards	"Małe rzeczy"	Best Hit	Nominated
2012	ESKA Music Awards	"Sen o przyszłości"	Best Music Video on Eska TV	Won
