= Skin and Bones =

Skin and Bones may refer to:

== Music ==
=== Albums ===
- Skin and Bones (Flashy Python album) or the title song, 2009
- Skin and Bones (Foo Fighters album) or the 2005 title song (see below), 2006
- Skin and Bones (Lyriel album) or the title song, 2014

=== Songs ===
- "Skin and Bones" (David Kushner song), 2024
- "Skin and Bones", by the Avett Brothers from Magpie and the Dandelion, 2013
- "Skin and Bones", by Cage the Elephant from Social Cues, 2019
- "Skin and Bones", by David Kushner from The Dichotomy, 2024
- "Skin and Bones", by Foo Fighters from the B-side of the single "DOA", 2005
- "Skin & Bones", by Jars of Clay from Inland, 2013
- "Skin and Bones", by Jet from Shine On
- "Skin & Bones", by Marianas Trench from Fix Me, 2006

== Other uses ==
- Skin & Bones (novel), a 2000 Hardy Boys book
- "Skin and Bones" (Fear Itself), a 2008 TV episode
- "Skin and Bones" (Roswell), a 2000 TV episode

== See also ==
- Skin & Bone (disambiguation)
