= The Voice of Poland season 14 =

2023 season of Polish television show

The Voice of Poland
- Season 14
- Hosted by: Tomasz Kammel; Aleksander Sikora
- Judges: Justyna Steczkowska; Lanberry; Marek Piekarczyk; Tomson and Baron
- No. of contestants: 60
- Winner: Jan Górka
- Winning coach: Lanberry
- Runner-up: Antoni Zimnal

Release
- Original network: TVP 2
- Original release: September 2 – November 25, 2023

Season chronology
- ← Previous; Season 13 Next → Season 15

The fourteenth season of the Polish singing competition The Voice of Poland began airing on September 2, 2023, on TVP 2. It is airing on Saturdays at 20:00. Tomson and Baron, Justyna Steczkowska, Marek Piekarczyk and Lanberry returned to the show for their twelfth, sixth, seventh and second season, respectively, making it the first time in the history of the show when there is not any change in the coaching line-up.

Jan Górka won the season, marking Lanberry's first win as a coach.

== Overview ==
=== Panelists ===
On August 8, 2023, it was confirmed that all coaches from the previous season would return in the upcoming season. Tomasz Kammel and Aleksander Sikora returned to the show as hosts for their thirteenth and third season, respectively. Małgorzata Tomaszewska had to resign from the function of the host due to her pregnancy.

Coaches of the fourteenth season

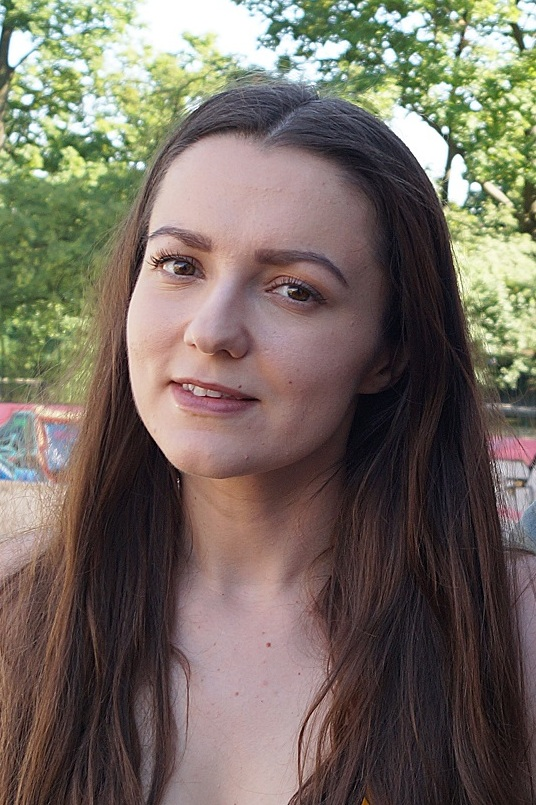
Lanberry

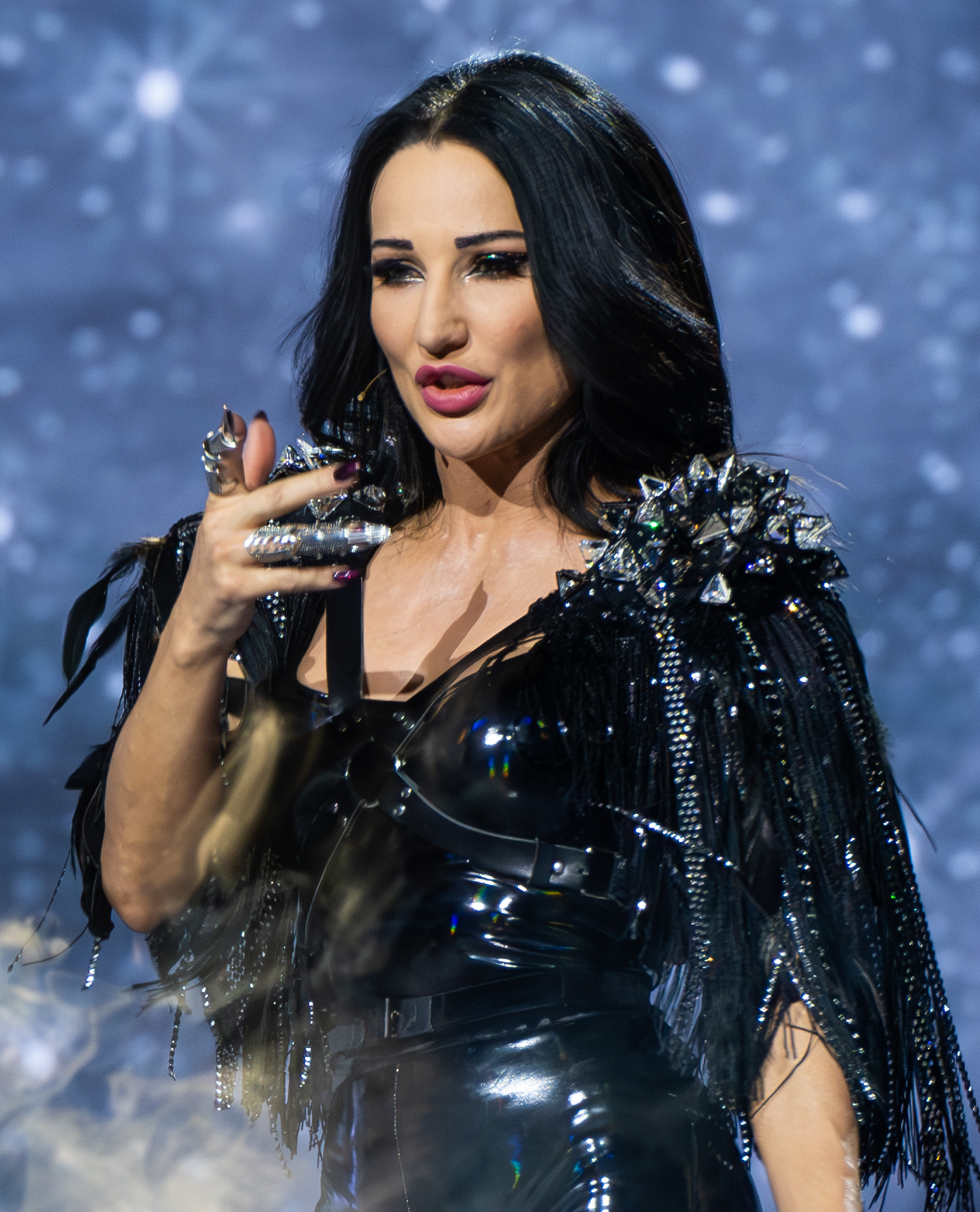
Justyna Steczkowska

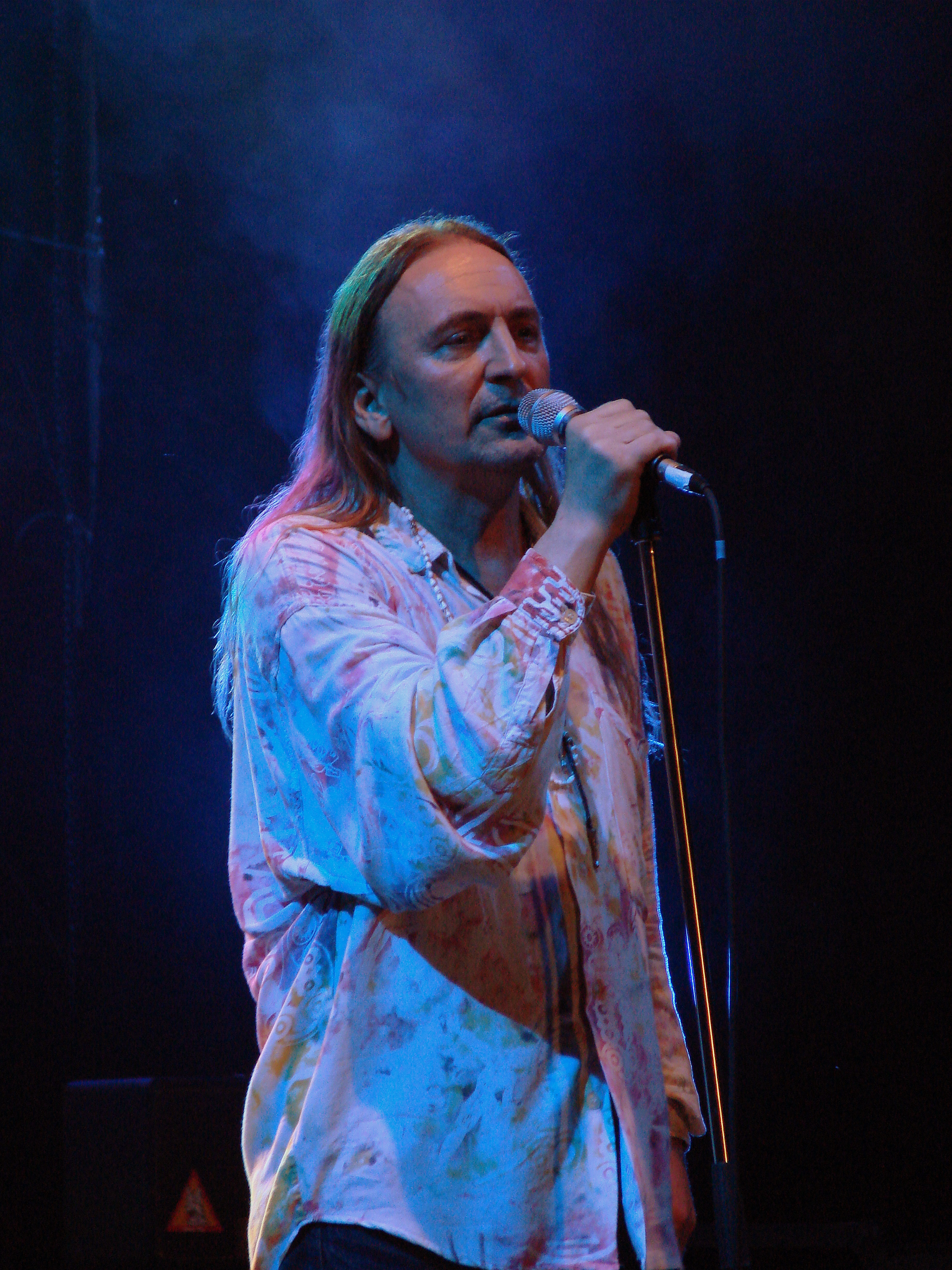
Marek Piekarczyk

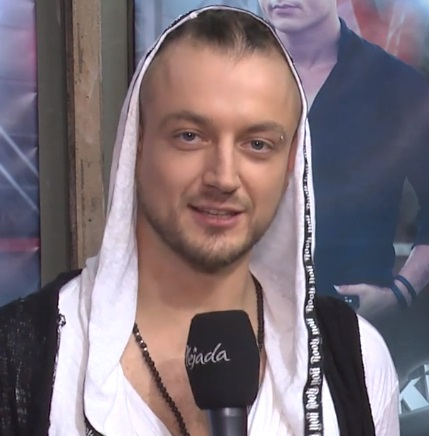
Baron

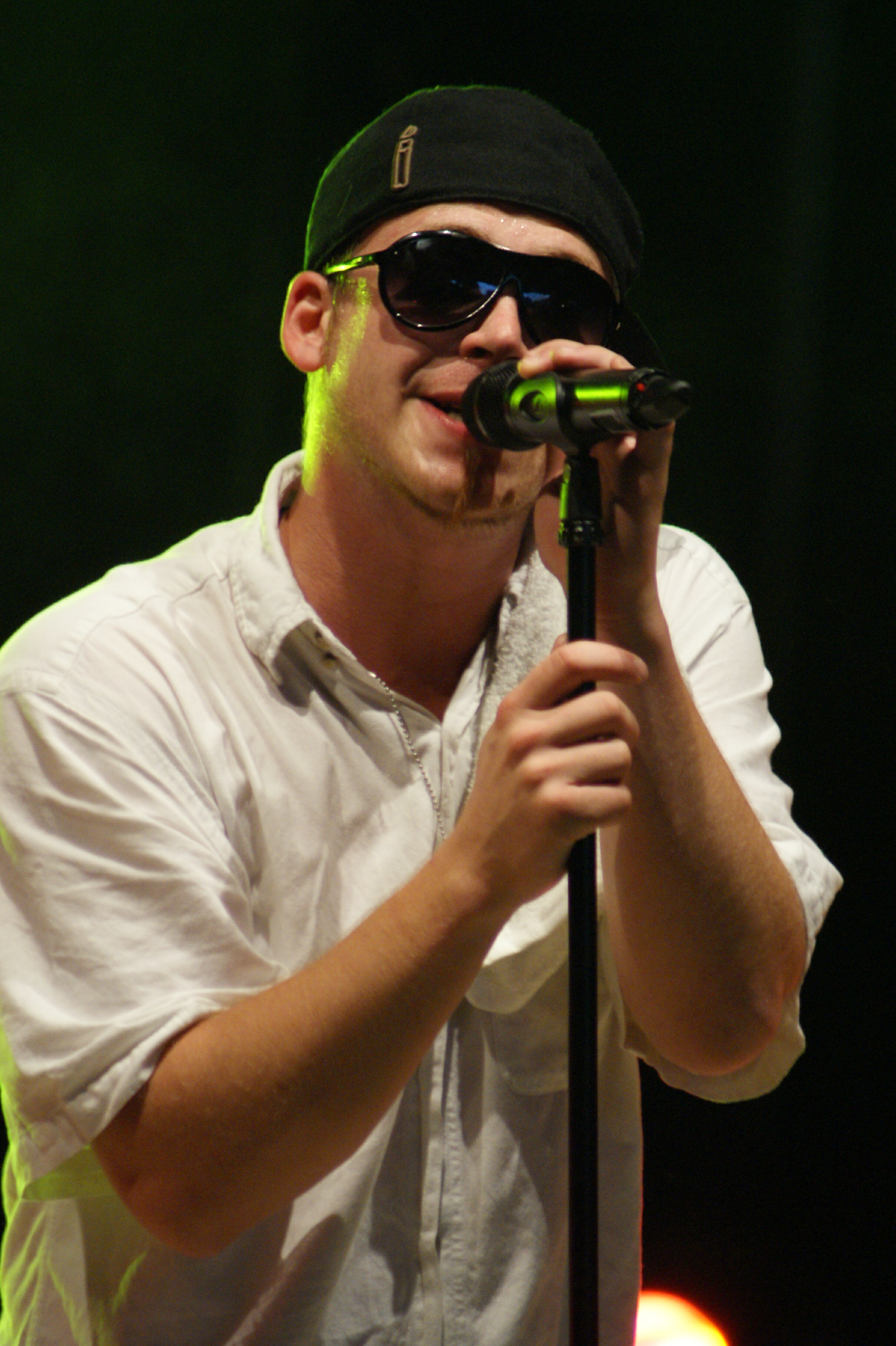
Tomson
Hosts of the fourteenth season

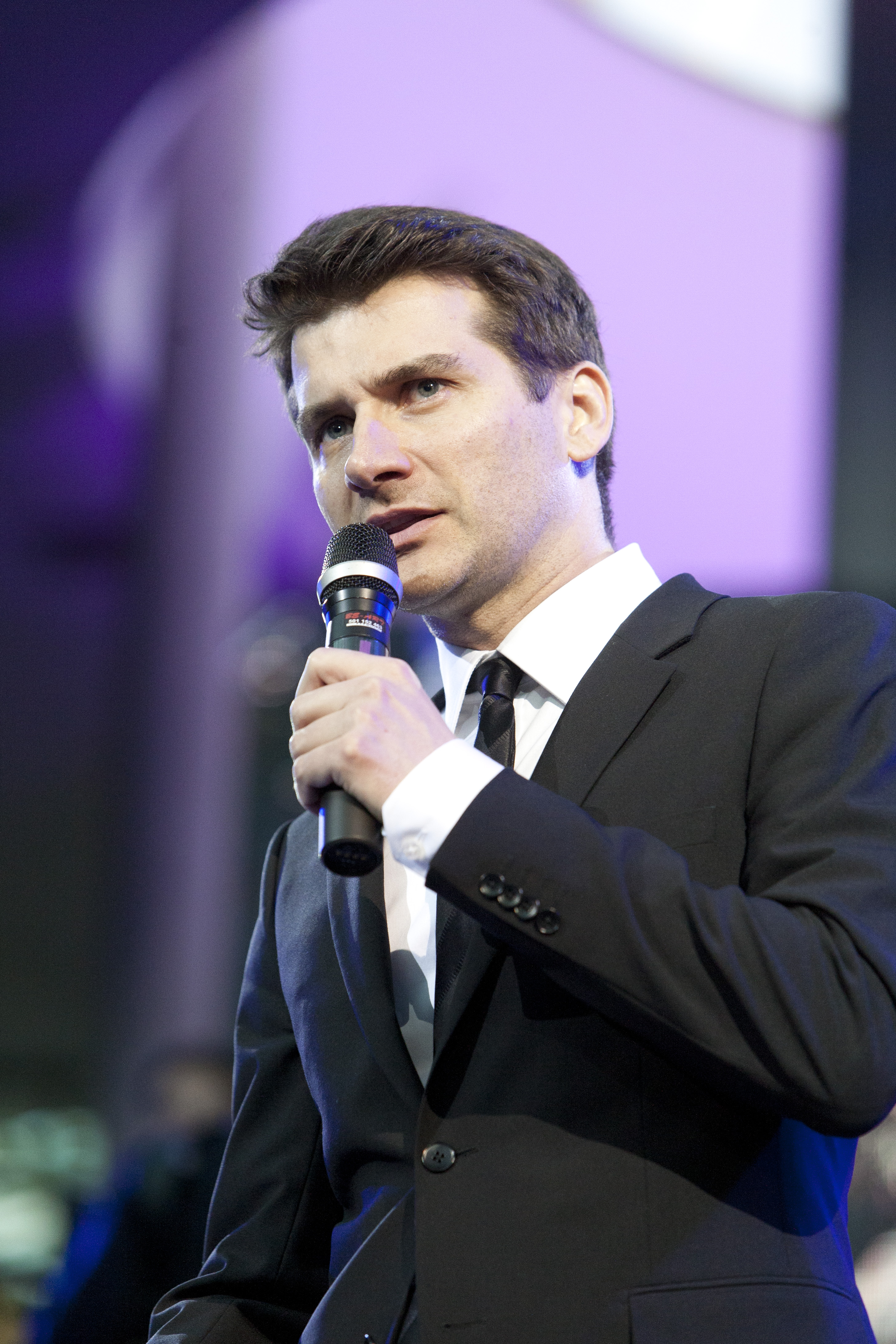
Tomasz Kammel

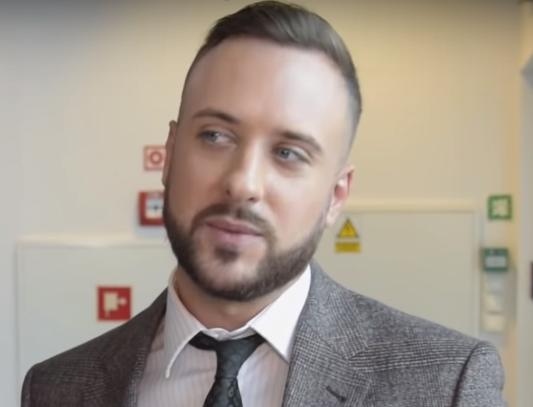
Aleksander Sikora

=== Additions and changes ===
The season will introduce a number of changes as far as the rules of the show are concerned. First of all, the number of contestants was increased from 12 to 15. Moreover, coaches will now be able to use their "Superblock button" only after a contestant's performance. The number of blocks was increased from two to three. Unlike in previous seasons, during the Battles stage coaches will have to divide their teams into trios, not duos, and only one person from each trio will advance to the Knockout round, during which 5 contestants from each of the teams will perform, but only four of them will be chosen to compete in the Live shows.

== Teams ==
Color key

- Winner
- Runner-up
- Third place
- Fourth place
- Eliminated in the Semi-finals
- Eliminated in the Quarterfinals
- Eliminated in the first Live round
- Eliminated in the Knockouts
- Eliminated in the Main Battles
- Eliminated in the Pre-Battle

Coaches' teams
Coach	Top 60 Artists				
Tomson & Baron					
Tomson & Baron	Becky Sangolo	Paweł Kozicz	Łukasz Samburski	Monika Kluszczyńska	Bartłomiej Broniewski
Tomson & Baron	Maryna Viarenich	Agnieszka Formela	Jakub Kośmider	Natalia Kruźlak	Oliwia Hudek
Tomson & Baron	Patrycja Wanat	Bartosz Oszczędłowski	Anna Poszelużna	Anna Rogowska	Anna Przydacz
Justyna Steczkowska					
Justyna Steczkowska	Maja Walentynowicz	Bartosz Michniewicz	Max Miszczyk	Oliwia Skrzypczyk	Zuzia Janik
Justyna Steczkowska	Aleks Szczepanik	Julia Fijałkowska	Oliwia Lach	Magdalena Leszczyńska	Wojciech Królak
Justyna Steczkowska	Mateusz Mazela	Kamila Jakubite	Natalia Kłodnicka	Anton Borovyi	Łukasz Darłak
Lanberry					
Lanberry	Jan Górka	Daniel Borzewski	Damazy Wachuła	Martyna Lasiecka	Paulina Rzepka
Lanberry	Sabina Kułak	Wiktoria Stefańska-Depa	Patrycja Piątek	Karolina Popiołek	Basia Błaszczyk
Lanberry	Dominik Jarocki	Błażej Bączkiewicz	Adam Halamus	Inga Marukyan	Jakub Mazur
Marek Piekarczyk					
Marek Piekarczyk	Antoni Zimnal	Michał Sołtan	Nicole Muller	Dominika Krassowska	Monika Mazur
Marek Piekarczyk	Mateusz Warzywoda	Klaudia Danielewicz	Daniel Grzybowski	Ewangelia Argiri	Monika Wilczyńska
Marek Piekarczyk	Magdalena Koszyk	Alicja Kuszowska	Adrian Litewka	Katarzyna Parszuta	Zuzanna Wysocka

== Blind auditions ==
The show began with the Blind Auditions on September 2, 2023. In each audition, an artist sings their piece in front of the coaches whose chairs are facing the audience. If a coach is interested to work with the artist, they will press their button to face the artist. If a singular coach presses the button, the artist automatically becomes part of their team. If multiple coaches turn, they will compete for the artist, who will decide which team they will join. Each coach has three "superblocks" to prevent another coach from getting an artist, but they can use it only after a contestant's performance. Each coach ends up with 15 artists by the end of the blind auditions, creating a total of 60 artists advancing to the battles.

Blind auditions color key
✔	Coach pressed "I WANT YOU" button
	Artist joined a coach's team
	Artist received a "Four-Chair Turn"
	Artist defaulted to a coach's team
	Artist was eliminated with no coach pressing their button
✘	Coach pressed "I WANT YOU" button, but was Super Blocked by another coach from getting the artist
	Super Blocked by Tomson & Baron Super Blocked by Justyna Super Blocked by Lanberry Super Blocked by Marek

=== Episodes 1 & 2 (September 2, 2023) ===
First blind audition results
Order	Artist	Age	Song	Coach's and artist's choices			
Order	Artist	Age	Song	Tomson & Baron	Justyna	Lanberry	Marek
1	Maja Walentynowicz	16	"Need You Now"	✔	✔	✔	–
2	Jan Górka	20	"I Ain't Worried"	–	✔	✔	–
3	Kinga Chruścik	28	"Heart of Glass"	–	–	–	–
4	Monika Kluszczyńska	34	"Tattoo"	✔	✔	✔	✔
5	Mateusz Warzywoda	19	"Podpalmy to"	–	–	–	✔
6	Julia Fijałkowska	21	"Nic dwa razy"	–	✔	–	–
7	Max Miszczyk	21	"Creepin'"	✔	✔	✔	✔

Second blind audition results
Order	Artist	Age	Song	Coach's and artist's choices			
Order	Artist	Age	Song	Tomson & Baron	Justyna	Lanberry	Marek
1	Damazy Wachuła	22	"Eyes Closed"	✘	✘	✔	✔
2	Natalia Kruźlak	19	"O nich, o tobie"	✔	–	–	✔
3	Sabina Kułak	20	"Out of Reach"	–	–	✔	✔
4	Kacper Wiśniewski	20	"Herbata z imbirem"	–	–	–	–
5	Bartosz Oszczędłowski	30	"Save Tonight"	✔	–	–	–
6	Oliwia Skrzypczyk	30	"Moon River"	✔	✔	–	✔
7	Daniel Grzybowski	41	"Who Wants to Live Forever"	✔	✔	✔	✔

=== Episodes 3 & 4 (September 9, 2023) ===
Third blind audition results
Order	Artist	Age	Song	Coach's and artist's choices			
Order	Artist	Age	Song	Tomson & Baron	Justyna	Lanberry	Marek
1	Agnieszka Formela	22	"Gossip"	✔	–	–	✔
2	Natalia Kłodnicka	25	"Dłoń"	✔	✔	✔	✔
3	Zuzanna Rychlewska	26	"Marcepan"	–	–	–	–
4	Wiktoria Stefańska-Depa	27	"Czekam na znak"	✔	–	✔	✔
5	Patrycja Wanat	44	"Flowers"	✔	✔	–	✔
6	Anna Przydacz	21	"All I Want"	✔	–	–	✔
7	Michał Sołtan	38	"Light My Fire"	✘	✔	✔	✔

Fourth blind audition results
Order	Artist	Age	Song	Coach's and artist's choices			
Order	Artist	Age	Song	Tomson & Baron	Justyna	Lanberry	Marek
1	Paulina Rzepka	18	"Dusk Till Dawn"	✘	✔	✔	✔
2	Dominik Jarocki	31	"Sweet Dreams (Are Made Of This)"	✔	–	✔	✔
3	Magdalena Koszyk	25	"The Most Beautiful Girl in the World"	–	–	–	✔
4	Łukasz Darłak	38	"Jeden moment"	–	✔	–	✔
5	Piotr Walczak	29	"Supermoce"	–	–	–	–
6	Alicja Kuszowska	30	"How Come You Don't Call Me"	–	✔	–	✔
7	Becky Sangolo	28	"Stone Cold"	✔	✔	✔	✔

=== Episodes 5 & 6 (September 16, 2023) ===
Fifth blind audition results
Order	Artist	Age	Song	Coach's and artist's choices			
Order	Artist	Age	Song	Tomson & Baron	Justyna	Lanberry	Marek
1	Łukasz Samburski	29	"Rebel Yell"	✔	✔	✔	✔
2	Patrycja Piątek	25	"Kosmiczne energie"	–	–	✔	✔
3	Antoni Zimnal	17	"Zabiorę cię dziś na bal"	–	✔	–	✔
4	Joanna Lupa	26	"Blank Space"	–	–	–	–
5	Anna Poszelużna	29	"Beggin' "	✔	–	–	✔
6	Błażej Bączkiewicz	33	"Everybody's Changing"	–	–	✔	✔
7	Oliwia Lach	21	"Odbicie"	–	✔	–	✔

Sixth blind audition results
Order	Artist	Age	Song	Coach's and artist's choices			
Order	Artist	Age	Song	Tomson & Baron	Justyna	Lanberry	Marek
1	Oliwia Hudek	19	"Higher Love"	✔	✔	✔	✔
2	Adam Halamus	31	"Kiss Me"	–	–	✔	–
3	Kinga Lewko	19	"Tyle słońca w całym mieście"	–	–	–	–
4	Monika Mazur	26	"Jeszcze w zielone gramy"	✔	–	–	✔
5	Klaudia Danielewicz	N/A	"Trustfall"	–	–	–	✔
6	Magdalena Leszczyńska	17	"No Roots"	–	✔	–	✔
7	Natalia Niedziela-Zubel	29	"Spending My Time"	–	–	–	–
8	Jakub Kośmider	16	"Glimpse of Us"	✔	✔	✔	✔

=== Episodes 7 & 8 (September 23, 2023) ===
Seventh blind audition results
Order	Artist	Age	Song	Coach's and artist's choices			
Order	Artist	Age	Song	Tomson & Baron	Justyna	Lanberry	Marek
1	Paweł Kozicz	27	"Dancing in the Moonlight"	✔	✔	✔	✔
2	Evangelia Argiri	27	"Lift Me Up"	–	–	–	✔
3	Inez Czajkowska	19	"Wielka dama tańczy sama"	–	–	–	–
4	Franciszek Barnowski	21	"How Do I Say Goodbye"	–	–	–	–
5	Julia Jadczyszyn	-	"Ktoś inny"	–	–	–	–
6	Bartłomiej Broniewski	29	"Ordinary World"	✔	✔	✔	✔
7	Kamila Jakubenaite	18	"When the Party's Over"	–	✔	–	✔
8	Inga Marukyan	26	"Ramię w Ramię"	✔	–	✔	–
9	Luiza Kliś	26	"By Your Side"	–	–	–	–
10	Karolina Popiołek	26	"People Help the People"	✔	✔	✔	✔

Eighth blind audition results
Order	Artist	Age	Song	Coach's and artist's choices			
Order	Artist	Age	Song	Tomson & Baron	Justyna	Lanberry	Marek
1	Nicola Müller	25	"Gossip"	✘	–	✘	✔
2	Monika Wilczyńska	30	"Żal mi tamtych nocy i dni"	–	–	–	✔
3	Mateusz Mazela	24	"Colourblind"	✔	✔	–	–
4	Basia Błaszczyk	29	"Kochaj mnie"	–	✔	✔	✔
5	Kacper Szczurek	26	"Galácticos"	–	–	–	–
6	Wojtek Królak	23	"Sweet Dreams (Are Made of This)"	–	✔	–	✔
7	Dominika Krassowska	23	"Light My Fire"	✔	✔	✔	✔

=== Episodes 9 & 10 (September 30, 2023) ===
Seventh blind audition results
Order	Artist	Age	Song	Coach's and artist's choices			
Order	Artist	Age	Song	Tomson & Baron	Justyna	Lanberry	Marek
1							
2							
3							
4							
5							
6							
7							

Eighth blind audition results
Order	Artist	Age	Song	Coach's and artist's choices			
Order	Artist	Age	Song	Tomson & Baron	Justyna	Lanberry	Marek
1							
2							
2							
3							
4							
5							
6							
7							

== Battles round ==
The battles began airing on October 7, 2023. This season's battles have been divided into 2 parts. During pre-battle, the coaches pick three of their artists in a singing match and then select two of them to advance to the main battle to perform as a duo. During the main battle two of their artists will perform a different song and then coach select one of them to advance to the next round. At the end of this round, five artists will remain on each team. In total, 20 artists advance to the knockouts. For the first time since the inaugural season, there are no steals during the battles round.

=== Pre-Battles ===
Pre-Battles rounds color key
Artist won the Pre-Battle and advanced to the Battles
Artist lost the Pre-Battle and was eliminated

Pre-Battles results
Episode	Coach	Order	Winners	Song	Loser
Episode 11 (October 7)	Lanberry	1	Sabina Kułak	"Beauty and the Beast"	Dominik Jarocki
Episode 11 (October 7)	Lanberry	1	Paulina Rzepka	"Beauty and the Beast"	Dominik Jarocki
Episode 11 (October 7)	Lanberry	2	Daniel Borzewski	"September"	Inga Marukyan
Episode 11 (October 7)	Lanberry	2	Patrycja Piątek	"September"	Inga Marukyan
Episode 11 (October 7)	Lanberry	3	Martyna Lasiecka	"Rzuć to wszystko co złe"	Jakub Mazur
Episode 11 (October 7)	Lanberry	3	Basia Błaszczyk	"Rzuć to wszystko co złe"	Jakub Mazur
Episode 11 (October 7)	Lanberry	4	Damazy Wachuła	"Bądź Moim Natchnieniem"	Błażej Bączkiewicz
Episode 11 (October 7)	Lanberry	4	Karolina Popiołek	"Bądź Moim Natchnieniem"	Błażej Bączkiewicz
Episode 11 (October 7)	Lanberry	5	Wiktoria Stefańska-Depa	"You Are the Sunshine of My Life"	Adam Halamus
Episode 11 (October 7)	Lanberry	5	Jan Górka	"You Are the Sunshine of My Life"	Adam Halamus
Episode 13 (October 14)	Marek Piekarczyk	1	Dominika Krassowska	"Dzień dobry, Mr Blues"	Magdalena Koszyk
Episode 13 (October 14)	Marek Piekarczyk	1	Monika Wilczyńska	"Dzień dobry, Mr Blues"	Magdalena Koszyk
Episode 13 (October 14)	Marek Piekarczyk	2	Mateusz Warzywoda	"Fly Me to the Moon"	Katarzyna Parszuta
Episode 13 (October 14)	Marek Piekarczyk	2	Antoni Zimnal	"Fly Me to the Moon"	Katarzyna Parszuta
Episode 13 (October 14)	Marek Piekarczyk	3	Daniel Grzybowski	"Dziewczyny Lubią Brąz"	Adrian Litewka
Episode 13 (October 14)	Marek Piekarczyk	3	Michał Sołtan	"Dziewczyny Lubią Brąz"	Adrian Litewka
Episode 13 (October 14)	Marek Piekarczyk	4	Monika Mazur	"The Look of Love"	Alicja Kuszowska
Episode 13 (October 14)	Marek Piekarczyk	4	Ewangielia Argiri	"The Look of Love"	Alicja Kuszowska
Episode 13 (October 14)	Marek Piekarczyk	5	Nicola Muller	"Sweet Home Chicago"	Zuzanna Wysocka
Episode 13 (October 14)	Marek Piekarczyk	5	Klaudia Danielewicz	"Sweet Home Chicago"	Zuzanna Wysocka
Episode 15 (October 21)	Justyna Steczkowska	1	Oliwia Skrzypczak	"Smooth Operator"	Anton Borowyi
Episode 15 (October 21)	Justyna Steczkowska	1	Wojciech Królak	"Smooth Operator"	Anton Borowyi
Episode 15 (October 21)	Justyna Steczkowska	2	Magdalena Leszczyńska	"Zwierzenia Ryśka, czyli jedzie pociąg"	Mateusz Mazela
Episode 15 (October 21)	Justyna Steczkowska	2	Zuzanna Janik	"Zwierzenia Ryśka, czyli jedzie pociąg"	Mateusz Mazela
Episode 15 (October 21)	Justyna Steczkowska	3	Oliwia Lach	"Somethin' Stupid"	Natalia Kłodnicka
Episode 15 (October 21)	Justyna Steczkowska	3	Bartosz Michniewicz	"Somethin' Stupid"	Natalia Kłodnicka
Episode 15 (October 21)	Justyna Steczkowska	4	Julia Fajkowska	"Moje serce to jest muzyk"	Kamile Jakubente
Episode 15 (October 21)	Justyna Steczkowska	4	Maja Walentynowicz	"Moje serce to jest muzyk"	Kamile Jakubente
Episode 15 (October 21)	Justyna Steczkowska	5	Max Miszczyk	"Lubię wracać tam gdzie byłem"	Łukasz Darłak
Episode 15 (October 21)	Justyna Steczkowska	5	Aleks Szczepanik	"Lubię wracać tam gdzie byłem"	Łukasz Darłak
Episode 17 (October 28)	Tomson & Baron	1	Paweł Kozicz	"Byłaś serca biciem"	Anna Przydacz
Episode 17 (October 28)	Tomson & Baron	1	Oliwia Hudek	"Byłaś serca biciem"	Anna Przydacz
Episode 17 (October 28)	Tomson & Baron	2	Bartłomiej Broniewski	"Gdy zakocham się"	Anna Rogowska
Episode 17 (October 28)	Tomson & Baron	2	Natalia Kuźlak	"Gdy zakocham się"	Anna Rogowska
Episode 17 (October 28)	Tomson & Baron	3	Jakub Kośmider	"The Girl from Ipanema"	Anna Poszelużna
Episode 17 (October 28)	Tomson & Baron	3	Monika Kluszczyńska	"The Girl from Ipanema"	Anna Poszelużna
Episode 17 (October 28)	Tomson & Baron	4	Łukasz Samburski	"Isn't She Lovely"	Bartosz Oszczędłowski
Episode 17 (October 28)	Tomson & Baron	4	Agnieszka Formela	"Isn't She Lovely"	Bartosz Oszczędłowski
Episode 17 (October 28)	Tomson & Baron	5	Maryna Viarenich	"Georgia on My Mind"	Patrycja Wanat
Episode 17 (October 28)	Tomson & Baron	5	Becky Sangolo	"Georgia on My Mind"	Patrycja Wanat

=== Main Battles ===
Battles color key
Artist won the Battle and advances to the Knockouts
Artist lost the Battle and was eliminated

Battles results
Episode	Coach	Order	Winners	Song	Loser
Episode 11 (October 7)	Lanberry	1	Paulina Rzepka	"Left Outside Alone"	Sabina Kułak
Episode 11 (October 7)	Lanberry	2	Daniel Borzewski	"Od Nowa"	Patrycja Piątek
Episode 11 (October 7)	Lanberry	3	Martyna Lasiecka	"Na Kolana"	Basia Błaszczyk
Episode 11 (October 7)	Lanberry	4	Damazy Wachuła	"Nie Kłami"	Karolina Popiołek
Episode 11 (October 7)	Lanberry	5	Jan Górka	"Daylight"	Wiktoria Stefańska-Depa
Episode 13 (October 14)	Marek Piekarczyk	1	Dominika Krassowska	"Bust Your Windows"	Magdalena Wilczyńska
Episode 13 (October 14)	Marek Piekarczyk	2	Antoni Zimnal	"Żółte kalendarze"	Mateusz Warzywoda
Episode 13 (October 14)	Marek Piekarczyk	3	Michał Sołtan	"Whole Lotta Love"	Daniel Grzybowski
Episode 13 (October 14)	Marek Piekarczyk	4	Monika Mazur	"Tin Pan Alley"	Ewangielia Argiri
Episode 13 (October 14)	Marek Piekarczyk	5	Nicola Muller	"Wrecking Ball"	Klaudia Danielewicz
Episode 15 (October 21)	Justyna Steczkowska	1	Oliwia Skrzypczyk	"I've Seen That Face Before (Libertango)"	Wojciech Królak
Episode 15 (October 21)	Justyna Steczkowska	2	Zuzanna Janik	"Za krótki sen"	Magdalena Leszczyńska
Episode 15 (October 21)	Justyna Steczkowska	3	Bartosz Michniewicz	"Say You Won't Let Go"	Oliwia Lach
Episode 15 (October 21)	Justyna Steczkowska	4	Maja Walentynowicz	"Zanim zrozumiesz"	Julia Fijałkowska
Episode 15 (October 21)	Justyna Steczkowska	5	Max Miszczyk	"Memories"	Aleks Szczepanik
Episode 17 (October 28)	Tomson & Baron	1	Paweł Kozicz	"Die for You"	Oliwia Hudek
Episode 17 (October 28)	Tomson & Baron	2	Bartłomiej Broniewski	"Rocket Man"	Natalia Kuźlak
Episode 17 (October 28)	Tomson & Baron	3	Monika Kluszczyńska	"Ostatnia nadzieja"	Jakub Kośmider
Episode 17 (October 28)	Tomson & Baron	4	Łukasz Samburski	"Tatuaż"	Agnieszka Formela
Episode 17 (October 28)	Tomson & Baron	5	Becky Sangolo	"Chandelier"	Maryna Viarenich

== Knockouts round ==
The knockouts began airing on October 7, 2023. During this stage, all contestants have to sing. In the end, four contestants from each team qualify for the live episodes.

Knockouts color key
Artist advanced to the Live Shows
Artist was eliminated

Knockouts results
Episode	Coach	Order	Artist	Song	Result
Episode 12 (October 7)
Episode 12 (October 7)	Lanberry	1	Paulina Rzepka	"You Know I'm No Good"	Eliminated
Episode 12 (October 7)	Lanberry	2	Daniel Borzewski	"Pomimo Burz"	Advanced
Episode 12 (October 7)	Lanberry	3	Martyna Lasiecka	"Życie Cudem Jest"	Advanced
Episode 12 (October 7)	Lanberry	4	Damazy Wachuła	"A Song for You"	Advanced
Episode 12 (October 7)	Lanberry	5	Jan Górka	"Before You Go"	Advanced
Episode 14 (October 14)
Episode 14 (October 14)	Marek Piekarczyk	1	Dominika Krassowska	„Wish I Didn't Miss You”	Advanced
Episode 14 (October 14)	Marek Piekarczyk	2	Antoni Zimnal	„Jeszcze się tam żagiel bieli”	Advanced
Episode 14 (October 14)	Marek Piekarczyk	3	Michał Sołtan	„Proud Mary”	Advanced
Episode 14 (October 14)	Marek Piekarczyk	4	Monika Mazur	„Pamiętasz była jesień”	Eliminated
Episode 14 (October 14)	Marek Piekarczyk	5	Nicola Muller	„Deeper”	Advanced
Episode 16 (October 21)
Episode 16 (October 21)	Justyna Steczkowska	1	Oliwia Skrzypczyk	„Have a Little Faith in Me”	Advanced
Episode 16 (October 21)	Justyna Steczkowska	2	Zuzanna Janik	„Słucham Cię w radiu co tydzień”	Eliminated
Episode 16 (October 21)	Justyna Steczkowska	3	Bartosz Michniewicz	„Another Love	Advanced
Episode 16 (October 21)	Justyna Steczkowska	4	Maja Walentynowicz	„Cisza”	Advanced
Episode 16 (October 21)	Justyna Steczkowska	5	Max Miszczyk	„All of Me”	Advanced
Episode 18 (October 28)
Episode 18 (October 28)	Tomson & Baron	1	Paweł Kozicz	„Lubię być”	Advanced
Episode 18 (October 28)	Tomson & Baron	2	Bartłomiej Broniewski	„And I Love Her”	Eliminated
Episode 18 (October 28)	Tomson & Baron	3	Monika Kluszczyńska	„Jestem kobietą”	Advanced
Episode 18 (October 28)	Tomson & Baron	4	Łukasz Samburski	„Będę z tobą”	Advanced
Episode 18 (October 28)	Tomson & Baron	5	Becky Sangolo	„I Just Want to Make Love to You”	Advanced

== Live shows ==
The Live shows began on November 4, 2023. When the teams consist of four contestants, the coach chooses from among the two contestants with the fewest votes from the viewers (who decide by sending text messages) the person who drops out of the program. Each live episode ends with the elimination of one person from each group. In the semi-final (when the team is made up of two people), each coach divides 100 points to their artists in any way they want. The same happens with the viewers' votes, and the artist with the most points added passes through to the Final.

== Results summary of live shows ==
=== Color key ===
Artist's info

- Artist from Team Tomson & Baron
- Artist from Team Lanberry
- Artist from Team Justyna
- Artist from Team Marek

Result details

- Winner
- Runner-up
- Third place
- Fourth place
- Advanced to the finale with the most points
- Saved by his/her coach
- Saved by the public
- Eliminated

=== Overall ===
Live shows results per week
Artist	Week 1	Week 2	Week 3	Final
Jan Górka	Safe	Safe	Advanced	Winner
Antoni Zimnal	Safe	Safe	Advanced	Runner-up
Becky Sangolo	Safe	Safe	Advanced	3rd Place
Maja Walentynowicz	Safe	Safe	Advanced	4th Place
Paweł Kozicz	Safe	Safe	Eliminated	Eliminated (Week 3)
Daniel Borzewski	Safe	Safe	Eliminated	Eliminated (Week 3)
Michał Sołtan	Safe	Safe	Eliminated	Eliminated (Week 3)
Bartosz Michniewicz	Safe	Safe	Eliminated	Eliminated (Week 3)
Łukasz Samburski	Safe	Eliminated	Eliminated (Week 2)	
Damazy Wachuła	Safe	Eliminated	Eliminated (Week 2)	
Nicole Muller	Safe	Eliminated	Eliminated (Week 2)	
Max Miszczyk	Safe	Eliminated	Eliminated (Week 2)	
Monika Kluszczyńska	Eliminated	Eliminated (Week 1)		
Martyna Lasiecka	Eliminated	Eliminated (Week 1)		
Dominika Krassowska	Eliminated	Eliminated (Week 1)		
Oliwia Skrzypczyk	Eliminated	Eliminated (Week 1)		

=== Per team ===
Live shows results per week
Artist	Week 1	Week 2	Week 3	Final
Becky Sangolo	Public's vote	Public's vote	Advanced	3rd Place
Paweł Kozicz	Coach's choice	Coach's choice	Eliminated	
Łukasz Samburski	Public's vote	Eliminated		
Monika Kluszczyńska	Eliminated			
Maja Walentynowicz	Public's vote	Public's vote	Advanced	4th Place
Bartosz Michniewicz	Public's vote	Coach's choice	Eliminated	
Max Miszczyk	Coach's choice	Eliminated		
Oliwia Skrzypczyk	Eliminated			
Jan Górka	Coach's choice	Coach's choice	Advanced	Winner
Daniel Borzewski	Public's vote	Public's vote	Eliminated	
Damazy Wachuła	Public's vote	Eliminated		
Martyna Lasiecka	Eliminated			
Antoni Zimnal	Public's vote	Public's vote	Advanced	Runner-up
Michał Sołtan	Coach's choice	Coach's choice	Eliminated	
Nicola Muller	Public's vote	Eliminated		
Dominika Krassowska	Eliminated			
