= The Voice of Poland season 15 =

2024 season of Polish television show

The Voice of Poland
- Season 15
- Hosted by: Paulina Chylewska; Maciej Musiał; Jan Dąbrowski
- Judges: Tomson & Baron; Lanberry; Kuba Badach; Michał Szpak
- No. of contestants: 48
- Winner: Anna Iwanek
- Winning coach: Kuba Badach
- Runner-up: Mikołaj Przybylski
- No. of episodes: 26

Release
- Original network: TVP 2
- Original release: September 7 – November 30, 2024

Season chronology
- ← Previous; Season 14 Next → Season 16

The fifteenth season of the Polish singing competition The Voice of Poland began airing on September 7, 2024, on TVP 2. It is airing on Saturdays at 20:00. Tomson & Baron and Lanberry returned to the show as coaches for their thirteenth and third seasons, respectively. Additionally, Michał Szpak returned to the show after his three-year hiatus for his fifth season, alongside Kuba Badach, who made his debut as a coach this season.

Anna Iwanek won the season, marking Kuba Badach's first win as a coach. With Iwanek's win, Badach became the fourth coach, after Marek Piekarczyk, Maria Sadowska and Michał Szpak to win on their debut season. In addition, this also marks the first winning artist that had a coach (2 in this instance) blocked in their blind audition (Lanberry blocking Michał, then Tomson & Baron blocking Lanberry).

== Overview ==
=== Development ===
On April 29, 2024, TVP announced that The Voice of Poland was renewed for a fifteenth season to air in the fall of that year.

=== Coaches and hosts ===
Coaches and hosts of The Voice of Poland Season 15

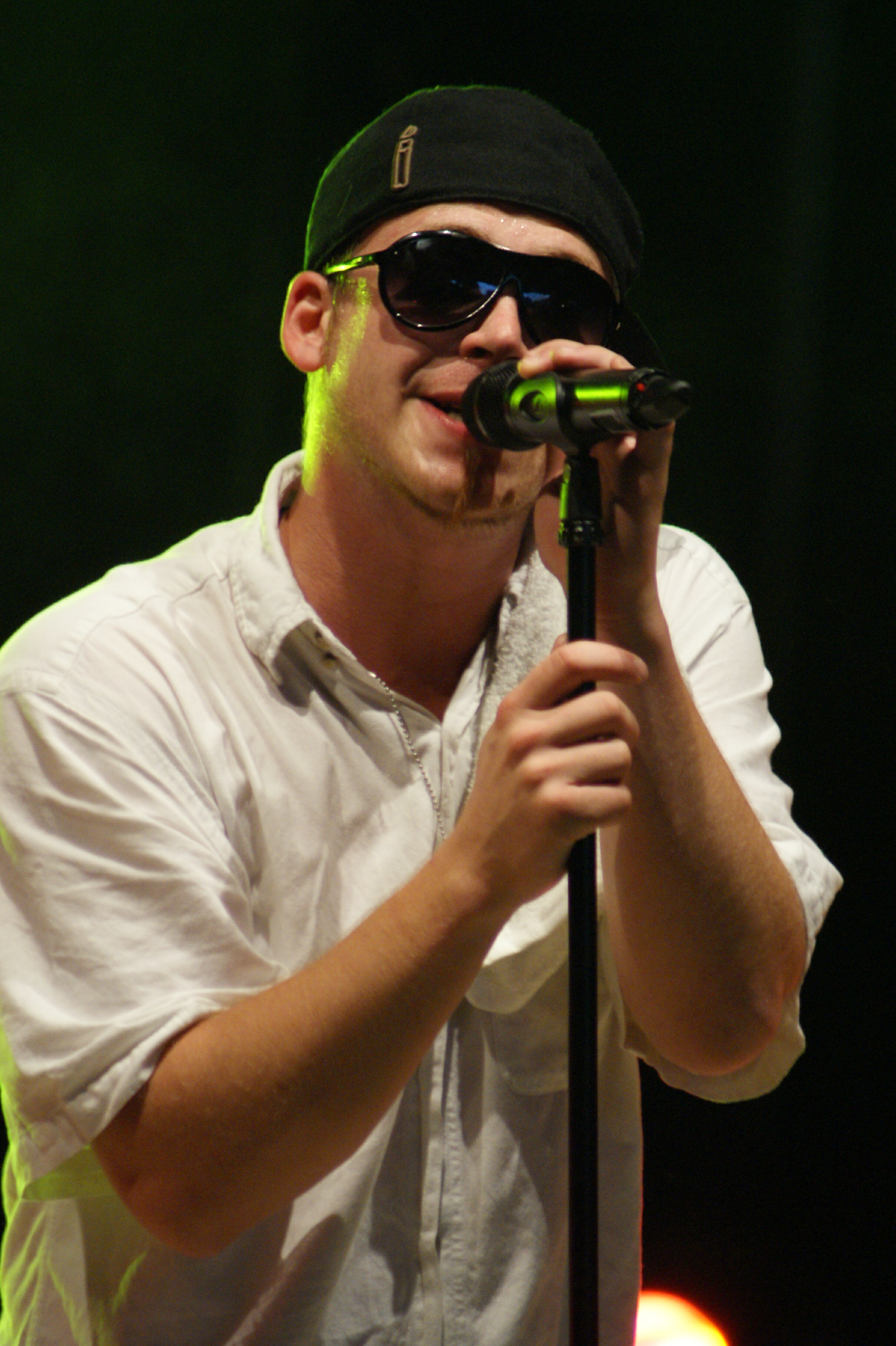
Tomson

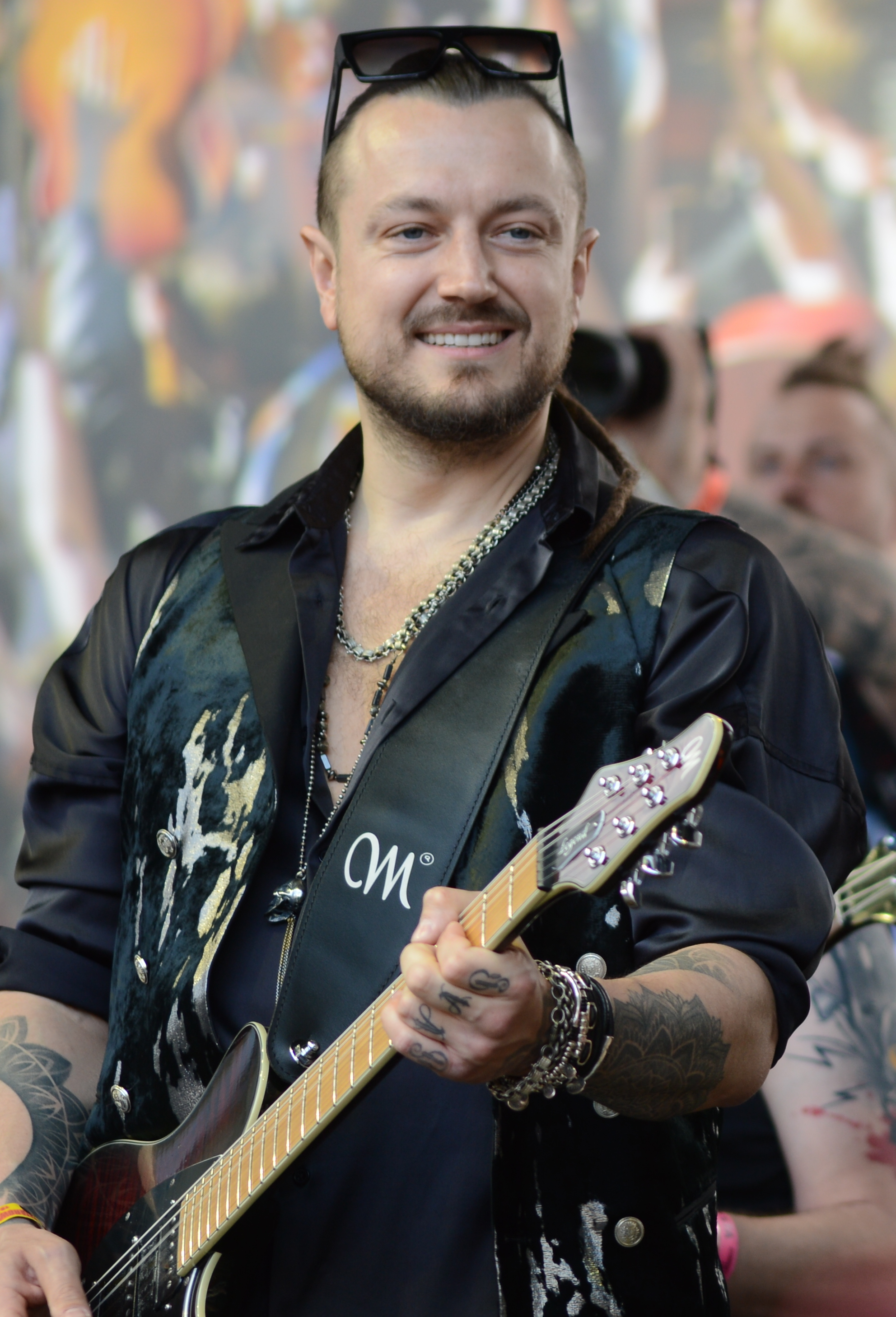
Baron

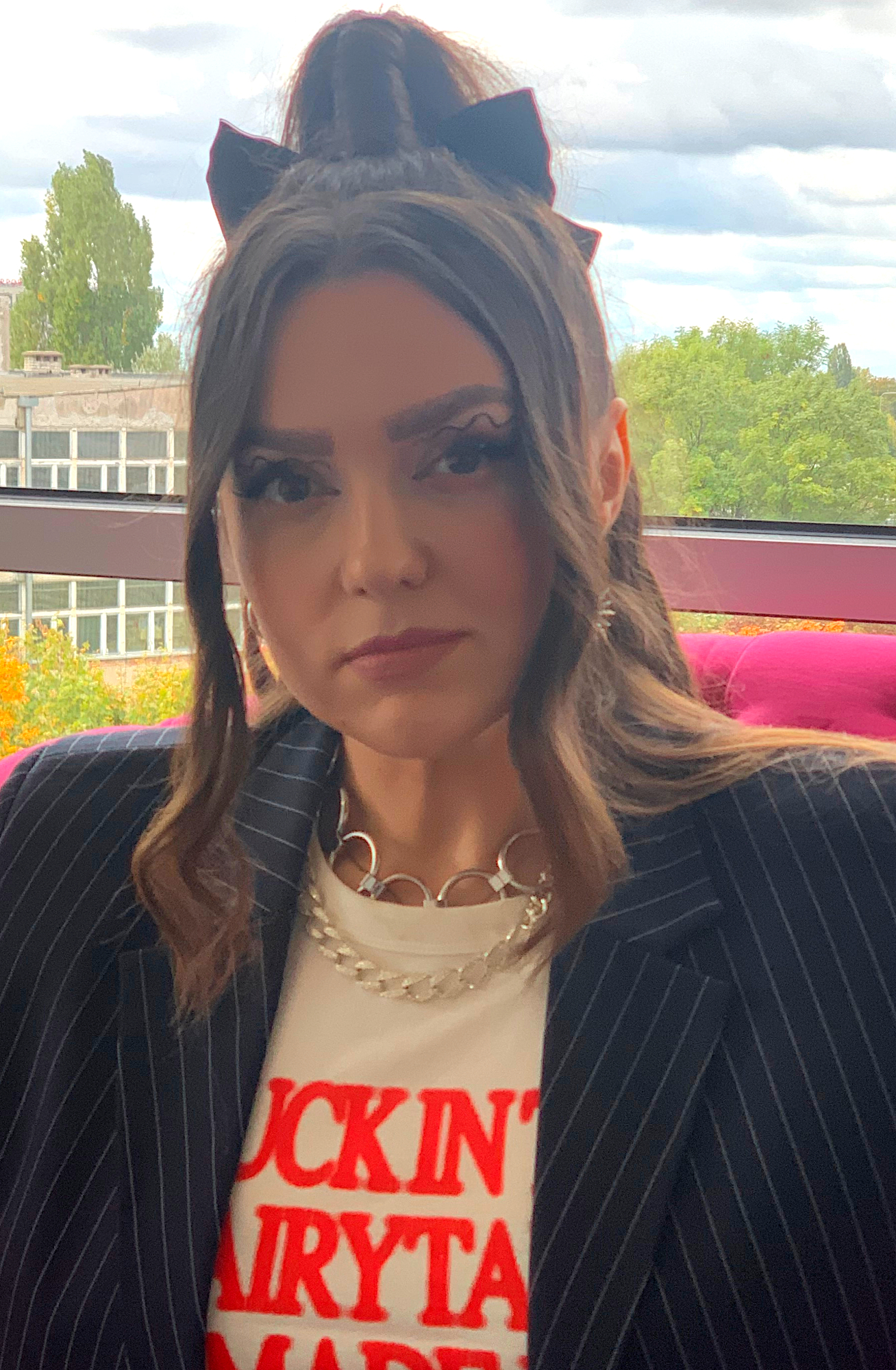
Lanberry

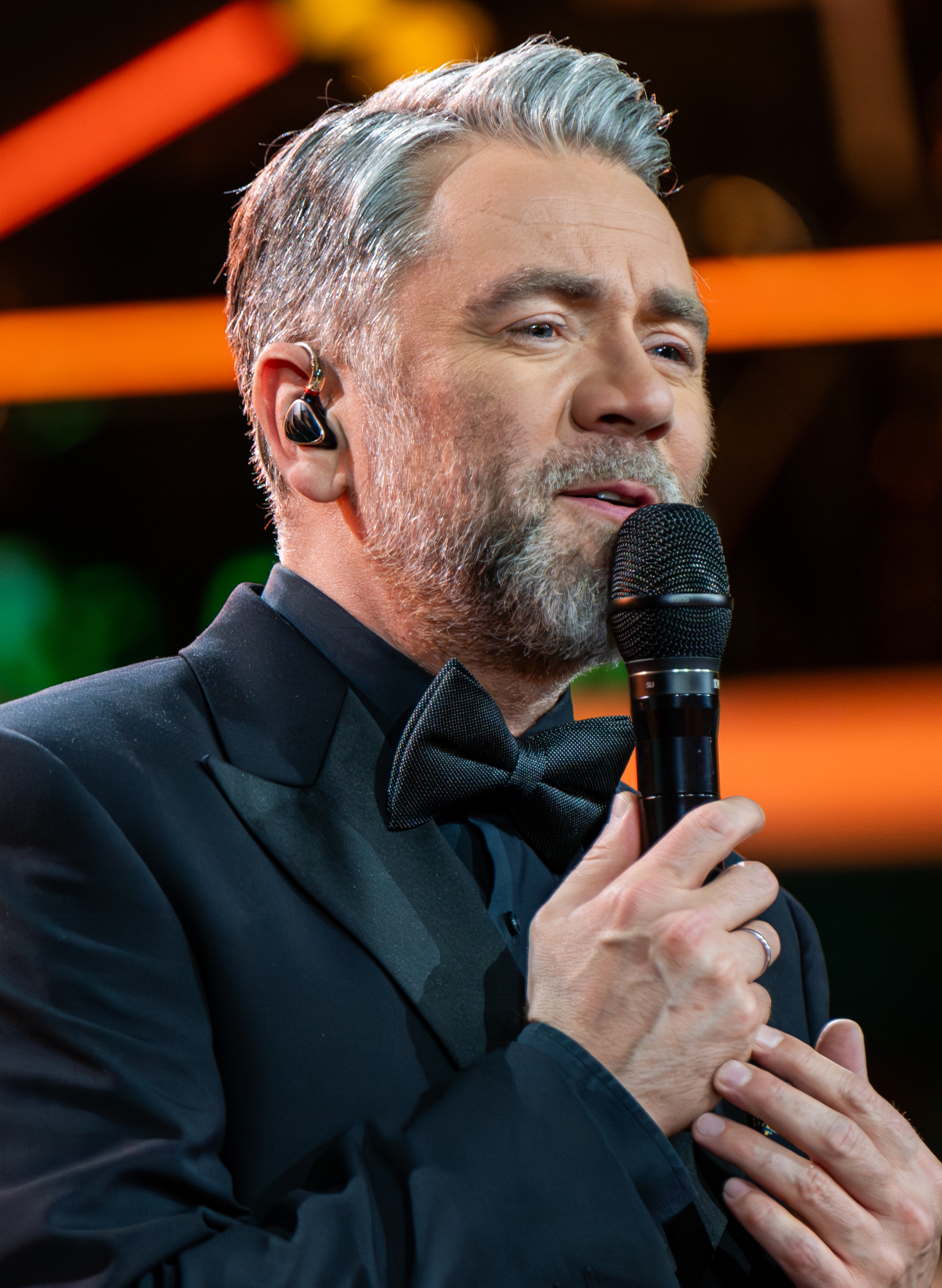
Kuba Badach

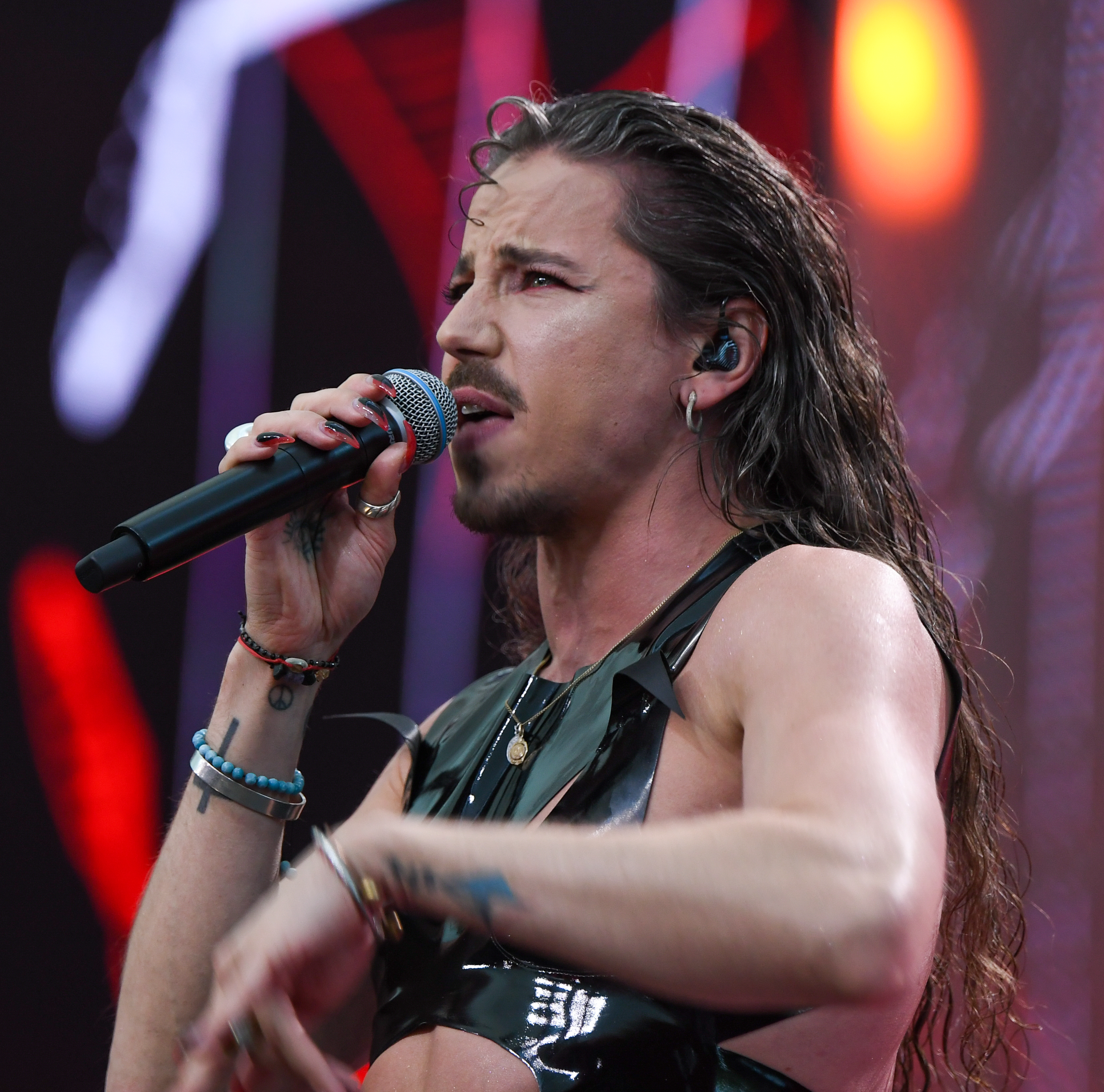
Michał Szpak

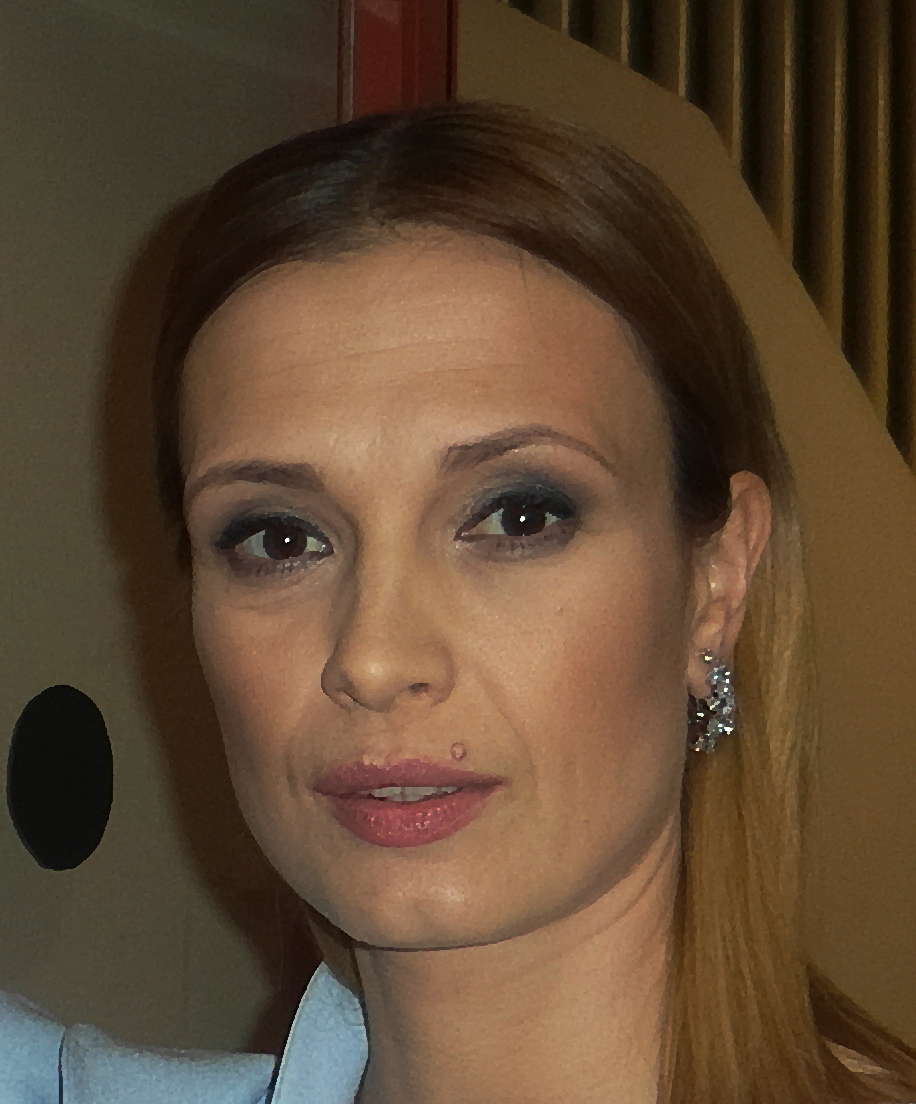
Paulina Chylewska

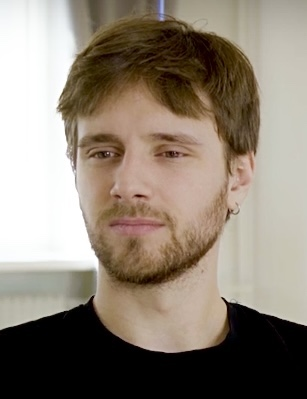
Maciej Musiał

Despite the rumors of changing the whole coaching line-up that participated in the previous season, both Tomson & Baron, and Lanberry returned, marking their thirteenth and third seasons as coaches, respectively. Coaches Justyna Steczkowska and Marek Piekarczyk departed the panel for the season. Steczkowska cited her ongoing concert tour as a reason for her departure, however she later became a new judge of the Polish version of Your Face Sounds Familiar.

Former coach Michał Szpak returns to the show following his absence in the last three seasons, marking his fifth season as a coach. Kuba Badach joins the coaching panel for his first season, marking the first time since season 10 in which a new male coach is introduced in a season.

Paulina Chylewska makes her debut as the main host, replacing Tomasz Kammel. Maciej Musiał, who returns after his three-season hiatus, joins her as the second main host this season. Additionally, Chylewska and Musiał are joined by Jan Dąbrowski for his first season as a backstage host. Dąbrowski previously served as a backstage host in the second and third seasons of The Voice Kids.

== Teams ==
Teams color key
Winner	Eliminated in the Live Playoffs
Runner-up	Eliminated in the Knockouts
Third place	Stolen in the Battle rounds
Fourth place	Stolen, switched with another artist and eliminated
Eliminated in the Semifinals	Eliminated in the Battle rounds
Eliminated in the Quarterfinals

Coaches' teams
Coach	Top 48 Contestants					
Tomson & Baron						
Tomson & Baron	Kacper Andrzejewski	Julia Konik-Rańda	Natalia Tul	Alicja Kalinowska	Weronika Gabryelczyk	Patrycja Ciborowska
Tomson & Baron	Adam Zalewski	~~Szymon Kuśmierczak~~	Janek Biduk	Natalia Pycek	Kara Przytuła	Piotr Sieluk
Tomson & Baron	Aleksandra Orłowska					
Lanberry						
Lanberry	Izabela Płóciennik	Yaroslav Rohalskyi	Aleksandra Leśniewicz	Maciej Kita	Iga Lewandowska	Maja Jabłońska & Zuza Jabłońska
Lanberry	Paweł Mosek	~~Weronika Gabryelczyk~~	Adam Bartusz	Jakub Jędrzejowski	Damian Szewczyk	Paulina Pytlak
Lanberry	Wiktoria Kuczyńska					
Kuba Badach						
Kuba Badach	Anna Iwanek	Maciej Rumiński	Adrianna Ropela	Julia Jadczyszyn	Natalia Smaś	Szymon Kuśmierczak
Kuba Badach	Kuba Anusiewicz	~~Mikołaj Przybylski~~	~~Izabela Płóciennik~~	Ula Kozielska	Zuzanna Wajdzik	Karol Wnuk
Kuba Badach	Kasia Jezior					
Michał Szpak						
Michał Szpak	Mikołaj Przybylski	Klaudia Stelmasiak	Bartłomiej Michałek	Iga Ośko	Ivan Klymenko	Zuzanna Górecka
Michał Szpak	Sonia Marchalewska	Martyna Dobrogowska	Aleksandra Idkowska	Ewelina Boczarska	Kinga Wołoszyn	Weronika Cieślik
Michał Szpak	Wiktoria Cetera					
Note: Italicized names are contestants stolen from another team during the battles (names struck through within former teams).

== Blind auditions ==
The show began with the Blind Auditions on September 7, 2024. In each audition, a contestant sings their piece in front of the coaches whose chairs are facing the audience. If a coach is interested to work with the artist, they will press their button to face the artist. If a singular coach presses the button, the contestant automatically becomes part of their team. If multiple coaches turn, they will compete for the contestant, who will decide which team they will join. Each coach has two "blocks" (reduced from 3 in the previous season) to prevent another coach from getting an artist, but they can use them only after a contestant's performance. Each coach ends up with 12 artists by the end of the blind auditions, creating a total of 48 contestants advancing to the battles.

Blind auditions color key
✔	Coach pressed "I WANT YOU" button
	Contestant joined a coach's team
	Contestant was eliminated with no coach pressing their button
✘	Coach pressed "I WANT YOU" button, but was blocked by another coach from getting the contestant
	Blocked by Tomson & Baron Blocked by Lanberry Blocked by Kuba Blocked by Michał

=== Episodes 1 & 2 (September 7) ===
The Coaches performed "Walk This Way" at the start of the show.

First blind auditions results
Order	Contestant	Age(s)	Song	Coach's and contestant's choices			
Order	Contestant	Age(s)	Song	Tomson & Baron	Lanberry	Kuba	Michał
1	Adam Zalewski	32	"Wiosna" ^{1}	✔	✔	✔	–
2	Weronika Cieślik	21	"Let's Get It On"	–	–	–	✔
3	Maja Jabłońska & Zuza Jabłońska	22 & 22	"Czas nas uczy pogody" ^{2}	–	✔	–	✔
4	Diana Dubenska	26	"I'm Sorry"	–	–	–	–
5	Julia Jadczyszyn	23	"Next to Me"	✔	–	✔	–
6	Szymon Kuśmierczak	23	"Man in the Mirror"	✔	✔	✔	✔

Second blind auditions results
Order	Contestant	Age(s)	Song	Coach's and contestant's choices			
Order	Contestant	Age(s)	Song	Tomson & Baron	Lanberry	Kuba	Michał
1	Paweł Mosek	30	"Hound Dog"	✔	✔	–	–
2	Aleksandra Idkowska	23	"Forever Young"	–	–	–	✔
3	Zuzanna Górecka	16	"Hold the Line"	✔	✔	✔	✔
4	Paulina Pytlak	24	"Wodymidaj" ^{3}	–	✔	–	–
5	Aleksandra Dyrna	28	"Time After Time"	–	–	–	–
6	Anna Iwanek	34	"Seven Nation Army"	✔	✘	✔	✘

=== Episodes 3 & 4 (September 14) ===
During the last blind audition in the fourth episode, Michał Szpak used both his "blocks." This is the first time in the history of the show that a coach uses all their "blocks" in the same audition.

Third blind auditions results
Order	Contestant	Age(s)	Song	Coach's and contestant's choices			
Order	Contestant	Age(s)	Song	Tomson & Baron	Lanberry	Kuba	Michał
1	Sonia Marchalewska	20	"hip hip hurra!" ^{4}	✔	✔	✔	✔
2	Piotr Surdynowski	27	"Cat's in the Cradle"	–	–	–	–
3	Adrianna Ropela	19	"Cry Me a River"	–	✔	✔	✔
4	Aleksandra Orłowska	25	"Vampire"	✔	–	–	–
5	Adam Bartusz	33	"Tolerancja" ^{5}	–	✔	–	–
6	Kara Przytuła	27	"Higher Love"	✔	✔	✔	–

Fourth blind auditions results
Order	Contestant	Age(s)	Song	Coach's and contestant's choices			
Order	Contestant	Age(s)	Song	Tomson & Baron	Lanberry	Kuba	Michał
1	Kinga Wołoszyn	17	"Hard to Say I'm Sorry"	✔	✔	✔	✔
2	Zuzanna Urbanik	19	"Na sen" ^{6}	–	–	–	–
3	Natalia Pycek	20	"Złamane serce jest OK" ^{7}	✔	–	✔	–
4	Ivan Klymenko	18	"Jesus to a Child"	–	–	–	✔
5	Sylwia Mavambu	38	"I'm Like a Bird"	–	–	–	–
6	Izabela Płóciennik	30	"Za późno" ^{8}	✘	✘	✔	✔

=== Episodes 5 & 6 (September 21) ===
The Coaches (excluding Kuba Badach) performed "Nieśmiertelni" ^{9} at the start of the fifth episode.

Fifth blind auditions results
Order	Contestant	Age(s)	Song	Coach's and contestant's choices			
Order	Contestant	Age(s)	Song	Tomson & Baron	Lanberry	Kuba	Michał
1	Patrycja Ciborowska	27	"Murder on the Dancefloor"	✔	–	✔	–
2	Natalia Smaś	16	"The Boy Is Mine"	–	✔	✔	✔
3	Agata Semkow	24	"Nim przyjdzie wiosna" ^{10}	–	–	–	–
4	Damian Szewczyk	50	"Money for Nothing"	✔	✔	–	–
5	Kasia Jezior	25	"Madison" ^{11}	✔	✔	✔	✔
6	Kacper Andrzejewski	29	"Gravity"	✔	✘	✘	✔

Sixth blind auditions results
Order	Contestant	Age(s)	Song	Coach's and contestant's choices			
Order	Contestant	Age(s)	Song	Tomson & Baron	Lanberry	Kuba	Michał
1	Jakub Jędrzejowski	17	"You Are the Reason"	–	✔	–	✔
2	Natalia Tul	24	"All Out of Fight"	✔	–	–	✔
3	Szymon Sarniak	20	"All Star"	–	–	–	–
4	Wiktoria Kuczyńska	17	"Dancing Queen"	–	✔	✔	–
5	Martyna Dobrogowska	20	"Tell Me You Love Me"	–	–	–	✔
6	Mikołaj Przybylski	20	"When You Say Nothing at All"	✔	✔	✔	✔

=== Episodes 7 & 8 (September 28) ===
Seventh blind auditions results
Order	Contestant	Age(s)	Song	Coach's and contestant's choices			
Order	Contestant	Age(s)	Song	Tomson & Baron	Lanberry	Kuba	Michał
1	Kuba Anusiewicz	24	"Beneath Your Beautiful"	–	✔	✔	✔
2	Iga Lewandowska	20	"Little Lies"	–	✔	–	✔
3	Maciej Kita	29	"Fragile"	✔	✔	✔	✔
4	Natalia Kryger	26	"Tańcz głupia" ^{12}	–	–	–	–
5	Klaudia Stelmasiak	22	"Royals"	–	✔	–	✔
6	Bartłomiej Michałek	28	"Beautiful Things"	✔	✔	–	✔

Eighth blind auditions results
Order	Contestant	Age(s)	Song	Coach's and contestant's choices			
Order	Contestant	Age(s)	Song	Tomson & Baron	Lanberry	Kuba	Michał
1	Karol Wnuk	29	"Hound Dog"	–	–	✔	–
2	Janek Bidiuk	20	"Cry Me a River"	✔	–	✔	–
3	Weronika Gabryelczyk	27	"Dance the Night"	–	✔	–	–
4	Julia Konik-Rańda	19	"I Don't Want to Miss a Thing"	✔	✔	–	✔
5	Paulina Szczygielska	20	"Out of Reach"	–	–	–	–
6	Iga Ośko	31	"Ironic"	✔	✔	✔	✔

=== Episodes 9 & 10 (October 5) ===
In the course of the blind auditions, Kuba Badach did not use either of his two "blocks."

Ninth blind auditions results
Order	Contestant	Age(s)	Song	Coach's and contestant's choices			
Order	Contestant	Age(s)	Song	Tomson & Baron	Lanberry	Kuba	Michał
1	Aleksandra Leśniewicz	34	"Warwick Avenue"	✔	✔	✔	✔
2	Alex Denes	23	"Zabiorę Cię" ^{13}	–	–	–	–
3	Wiktoria Cetera	18	"Ostatni" ^{14}	–	✔	–	✔
4	Alicja Kalinowska	39	"Nazywam się niebo" ^{15}	✔	–	–	–
5	Zuzanna Wajdzik	19	"Sutra" ^{16}	–	–	✔	✔
6	Ula Kozielska	24	"Texas Hold 'Em"	✔	–	✔	–

Tenth blind auditions results
Order	Contestant	Age(s)	Song	Coach's and contestant's choices			
Order	Contestant	Age(s)	Song	Tomson & Baron	Lanberry	Kuba	Michał
1	Yaroslav Rohalskyi	18	"Bad Day"	✔	✔	✔	✔
2	Ewelina Boczarska	18	"Palę w oknie" ^{17}	–	✔	–	✔
3	Piotr Sieluk	26	"Solo"	✔	✔	–	✔
4	Wojciech Dereń	41	"Pomaluj moje sny" ^{18}	–	–	–	–
5	Maciej Rumiński	18	"Zabierz tę miłość" ^{19}	✔	✔	✔	✔

^1 by Tomasz Organek ^2 by Grażyna Łobaszewska ^3 by Kwiat Jabłoni ^4 by sanah ^5 by Stanisław Sojka ^6 by Urszula ^7 by Daria Zawiałow ^8 by Kayah ^9 by Mrozu ^10 by Ralph Kaminski (orig. by Czesław Niemen) ^11 by Kaśka Sochacka ^12 by Margaret ^13 by Kancelarya ^14 by Edyta Bartosiewicz ^15 by Natalia Przybysz ^16 by Sistars ^17 by Mrozu ^18 by Breakout ^19 by Maciej Musiałowski & Julia Wieniawa

== Battles round ==
The battles began airing on October 12, 2024. In this round, the coaches pick two of their contestants in a singing match and then select one of them to advance to the next round. Losing contestants may be "stolen" by another coach, becoming new members of their team. Multiple coaches can attempt to steal a contestant, resulting in a competition for the contestant, who will ultimately decide which team they will go to. At the end of this round, seven contestants will remain on each team; six will be battle winners, and one from a steal. In total, 28 contestants advance to the knockouts.

Battles color key
Contestant won the Battle and advanced to the Knockouts
Contestant lost the Battle but was stolen by another coach and advanced to the Knockouts
Contestant lost the Battle and was stolen by another coach, but was later switched with another contestant and eliminated
Contestant lost the Battle and was eliminated

Battles results
Episode & Date	Coach	Order	Winner	Song	Loser	'Steal' result			
Episode & Date	Coach	Order	Winner	Song	Loser	Tomson & Baron	Lanberry	Kuba	Michał
Episode 11 (Saturday, October 12, 2024)	Michał	1	Bartłomiej Michałek	"Die with a Smile"	Martyna Dobrogowska	–	–	✔	N/A
Episode 11 (Saturday, October 12, 2024)	Kuba	2	Natalia Smaś	"Razem zestarzejemy się" ^{20}	Zuzanna Wajdzik	–	–	N/A	✔
Episode 11 (Saturday, October 12, 2024)	Lanberry	3	Iga Lewandowska	"I See Red"	Weronika Gabryelczyk	✔	N/A	–	–
Episode 11 (Saturday, October 12, 2024)	Tomson & Baron	4	Alicja Kalinowska	"Mercy"	Janek Biduk	N/A	–	–	✔
Episode 12 (Saturday, October 12, 2024)	Michał	1	Sonia Marchalewska	"Jezioro szczęścia" ^{21}	Wiktoria Cetera	–	–	–	N/A
Episode 12 (Saturday, October 12, 2024)	Kuba	2	Adrianna Ropela	"That's What Friends Are For"	Kasia Jezior	–	–	N/A	–
Episode 12 (Saturday, October 12, 2024)	Lanberry	3	Maciej Kita	"mori" ^{22}	Adam Bartusz	–	N/A	✔	–
Episode 12 (Saturday, October 12, 2024)	Tomson & Baron	4	Julia Konik-Rańda	"I Can't Make You Love Me"	Kara Przytuła	N/A	✔	–	–
Episode 13 (Saturday, October 19, 2024)	Tomson & Baron	1	Natalia Tul	"Tokyo" ^{23}	Aleksandra Orłowska	N/A	–	–	–
Episode 13 (Saturday, October 19, 2024)	Michał	2	Ivan Klymenko	"Don't Give Up"	Weronika Cieślik	–	–	–	N/A
Episode 13 (Saturday, October 19, 2024)	Lanberry	3	Maja Jabłońska & Zuza Jabłońska	"2:00" ^{24}	Wiktoria Kuczyńska	–	N/A	–	–
Episode 13 (Saturday, October 19, 2024)	Kuba	4	Kuba Anusiewicz	"Broken Wings"	Karol Wnuk	–	–	N/A	–
Episode 14 (Saturday, October 19, 2024)	Michał	1	Zuzanna Górecka	"How Will I Know"	Kinga Wołoszyn	–	–	–	N/A
Episode 14 (Saturday, October 19, 2024)	Tomson & Baron	2	Adam Zalewski	"Keeping Me Alive"	Natalia Pycek	N/A	✔	–	–
Episode 14 (Saturday, October 19, 2024)	Lanberry	3	Aleksandra Leśniewicz	"Nie ma, nie ma ciebie" ^{25}	Paulina Pytlak	–	N/A	–	–
Episode 14 (Saturday, October 19, 2024)	Kuba	4	Anna Iwanek	"Lose Control"	Ula Kozielska	–	✔	N/A	–
Episode 15 (Saturday, October 26, 2024)	Lanberry	1	Paweł Mosek	"Szare miraże" ^{26}	Damian Szewczyk	–	N/A	–	–
Episode 15 (Saturday, October 26, 2024)	Michał	2	Klaudia Stemasiak	"Decymy" ^{27}	Ewelina Boczarska	–	–	–	N/A
Episode 15 (Saturday, October 26, 2024)	Tomson & Baron	3	Patrycja Ciborowska	"One"	Piotr Sieluk	N/A	–	–	–
Episode 15 (Saturday, October 26, 2024)	Kuba	4	Julia Jadczyszyn	"I Knew You Were Waiting (For Me)"	Izabela Płóciennik	✔	✔	N/A	✔
Episode 16 (Saturday, October 26, 2024)	Lanberry	1	Yaroslav Rohalskyi	"Youngblood"	Jakub Jędrzejowski	–	N/A	✔	–
Episode 16 (Saturday, October 26, 2024)	Michał	2	Iga Ośko	"Drivers License"	Aleksandra Idkowska	–	–	–	N/A
Episode 16 (Saturday, October 26, 2024)	Kuba	3	Maciej Rumiński	"Nie proszę o więcej" ^{28}	Mikołaj Przybylski	–	–	N/A	✔
Episode 16 (Saturday, October 26, 2024)	Tomson & Baron	4	Kacper Andrzejewski	"Nieśmiertelni" ^{29}	Szymon Kuśmierczak	N/A	–	✔	–

^20 by Karolina Kozak ^21 by Bajm ^22 by Dawid Podsiadło ^23 by Varius Manx ^24 by sanah ^25 by Kayah & Goran Bregović ^26 by Manaam ^27 by Natalia Kukulska ^28 by Edyta Górniak ^29 by Mrozu

== Knockouts ==
The Knockouts premiered on November 2, 2024. During this stage, all contestants have to sing – the first four from each team are automatically put in the hot seats, and after subsequent performances of the remaining three, the coach decides whether a given contestant stays in the show or not. In the end, four contestants from each team qualify for the Live Playoffs.

Knockouts color key
Contestant was not switched out and advanced to the Live Playoffs
Contestant was eliminated, either immediately (indicated by a "—" in the "Switched with" column) or switched with another contestant

Knockouts results
Episode & Date	Coach	Order	Contestant	Song	Result	Switched with
Episode 17 (Saturday, November 2, 2024)	Lanberry	1	Izabela Płóciennik	"Stop!"	Advanced	N/A
Episode 17 (Saturday, November 2, 2024)	Lanberry	2	Paweł Mosek	"Na szczycie" ^{30}	Eliminated	N/A
Episode 17 (Saturday, November 2, 2024)	Lanberry	3	Maja Jabłońska & Zuza Jabłońska	"Zanim zrozumiesz" ^{31}	Eliminated	N/A
Episode 17 (Saturday, November 2, 2024)	Lanberry	4	Maciej Kita	"As It Was"	Advanced	N/A
Episode 17 (Saturday, November 2, 2024)	Lanberry	5	Yaroslav Rohalskyi	"This Love"	Advanced	Paweł Mosek
Episode 17 (Saturday, November 2, 2024)	Lanberry	6	Aleksandra Leśniewicz	"Right to Be Wrong"	Advanced	Maja Jabłońska & Zuza Jabłońska
Episode 17 (Saturday, November 2, 2024)	Lanberry	7	Iga Lewandowska	"Sztorm" ^{32}	Eliminated	N/A
Episode 17 (Saturday, November 2, 2024)	Michał					
Episode 17 (Saturday, November 2, 2024)	Michał	1	Zuzanna Górecka	"Unstoppable"	Eliminated	N/A
Episode 17 (Saturday, November 2, 2024)	Michał	2	Iga Ośko	"A to co mam..." ^{33}	Advanced	N/A
Episode 17 (Saturday, November 2, 2024)	Michał	3	Sonia Marchalewska	"Dzień Za Dniem" ^{34}	Eliminated	N/A
Episode 17 (Saturday, November 2, 2024)	Michał	4	Bartłomiej Michałek	"Under the Bridge"	Advanced	N/A
Episode 17 (Saturday, November 2, 2024)	Michał	5	Klaudia Stelmasiak	"Listen"	Advanced	Sonia Marchalewska
Episode 17 (Saturday, November 2, 2024)	Michał	6	Ivan Klymenko	"Nothing's Gonna Change My Love for You"	Eliminated	Zuzanna Górecka
Episode 17 (Saturday, November 2, 2024)	Michał	7	Mikołaj Przybylski	"Helena" ^{35}	Advanced	Ivan Klymenko
Episode 18 (Saturday, November 2, 2024)	Tomson & Baron	1	Kacper Andrzejewski	"Us"	Advanced	N/A
Episode 18 (Saturday, November 2, 2024)	Tomson & Baron	2	Adam Zalewski	"Time Is Running Out"	Eliminated	N/A
Episode 18 (Saturday, November 2, 2024)	Tomson & Baron	3	Weronika Gabryelczyk	"All About That Bass"	Eliminated	N/A
Episode 18 (Saturday, November 2, 2024)	Tomson & Baron	4	Patrycja Ciborowska	"Z tobą nie umiem wygrać" ^{36}	Eliminated	N/A
Episode 18 (Saturday, November 2, 2024)	Tomson & Baron	5	Alicja Kalinowska	"Kocham cię, kochanie moje" ^{37}	Advanced	Adam Zalewski
Episode 18 (Saturday, November 2, 2024)	Tomson & Baron	6	Natalia Tul	"Scars to Your Beautiful"	Advanced	Patrycja Ciborowska
Episode 18 (Saturday, November 2, 2024)	Tomson & Baron	7	Julia Konik-Rańda	"Good Luck"	Advanced	Weronika Gabryelczyk
Episode 18 (Saturday, November 2, 2024)	Kuba					
Episode 18 (Saturday, November 2, 2024)	Kuba	1	Natalia Smaś	"Domino"	Eliminated	N/A
Episode 18 (Saturday, November 2, 2024)	Kuba	2	Kuba Anusiewicz	"Maybe Tomorrow"	Eliminated	N/A
Episode 18 (Saturday, November 2, 2024)	Kuba	3	Szymon Kuśmierczak	"Uptown Funk"	Eliminated	N/A
Episode 18 (Saturday, November 2, 2024)	Kuba	4	Adrianna Ropela	"I'd Rather Go Blind"	Advanced	N/A
Episode 18 (Saturday, November 2, 2024)	Kuba	5	Julia Jadczyszyn	"Burn"	Advanced	Kuba Anusiewicz
Episode 18 (Saturday, November 2, 2024)	Kuba	6	Maciej Rumiński	"Jestem kamieniem" ^{38}	Advanced	Szymon Kuśmierczak
Episode 18 (Saturday, November 2, 2024)	Kuba	7	Anna Iwanek	"Galácticos" ^{39}	Advanced	Natalia Smaś

^30 by Grubson ^31 by Varius Manx ^32 by Cleo ^33 by Kasia Kowalska ^34 by Patrycja Markowska ^35 by Igo ^36 by Ania Dąbrowska ^37 by Maanam ^38 by Kayah ^39 by Mrozu

== Live shows ==
The Live shows began with the Live Playoffs on November 9, 2024. During the Live Playoffs, each team consists of four contestants. While two of them are saved by the viewers (who decide by sending text messages), the coach chooses the person who has to be eliminated from the other two contestants with the fewest votes from the viewers. Each live episode ends with the elimination of one person from each group.

Live shows color key
Contestant was saved by public's vote
Contestant was saved by their coach
Contestant was eliminated

=== Week 1: Live Playoffs – Top 16 Performances (November 9) ===
Live Playoffs results
Episode & Date	Coach	Order	Contestant	Song	Result
Episode 19 (Saturday, November 9, 2024)	Michał Szpak	1	Bartłomiej Michałek	"GoldenEye"	Public's vote
Episode 19 (Saturday, November 9, 2024)	Michał Szpak	2	Iga Ośko	"Miód" ^{40}	Eliminated
Episode 19 (Saturday, November 9, 2024)	Michał Szpak	3	Mikołaj Przybylski	"Scarlett" ^{41}	Public's vote
Episode 19 (Saturday, November 9, 2024)	Michał Szpak	4	Klaudia Stelmasiak	"Litania" ^{42}	Michał's choice
Episode 19 (Saturday, November 9, 2024)	Lanberry	1	Aleksandra Leśniewicz	"Ślepa miłość" ^{43}	Lanberry's choice
Episode 19 (Saturday, November 9, 2024)	Lanberry	2	Yaroslav Rohalskyi	"Stefania"	Public's vote
Episode 19 (Saturday, November 9, 2024)	Lanberry	3	Maciej Kita	"Krakowski spleen" ^{44}	Eliminated
Episode 19 (Saturday, November 9, 2024)	Lanberry	4	Izabela Płóciennik	"Crazy"	Public's vote
Episode 20 (Saturday, November 9, 2024)
Episode 20 (Saturday, November 9, 2024)	Tomson & Baron	1	Julia Konik-Rańda	"I Surrender"	Public's vote
Episode 20 (Saturday, November 9, 2024)	Tomson & Baron	2	Alicja Kalinowska	"Granda" ^{45}	Eliminated
Episode 20 (Saturday, November 9, 2024)	Tomson & Baron	3	Kacper Andrzejewski	"Hold Back the River"	Public's vote
Episode 20 (Saturday, November 9, 2024)	Tomson & Baron	4	Natalia Tul	"Jak skała" ^{46}	Tomson & Baron's choice
Episode 20 (Saturday, November 9, 2024)	Kuba Badach	1	Adrianna Ropela	"Run to You"	Kuba's choice
Episode 20 (Saturday, November 9, 2024)	Kuba Badach	2	Maciej Rumiński	"Przypływy" ^{47}	Public's vote
Episode 20 (Saturday, November 9, 2024)	Kuba Badach	3	Julia Jadczyszyn	"Fix You"	Eliminated
Episode 20 (Saturday, November 9, 2024)	Kuba Badach	4	Anna Iwanek	"Aquarius"	Public's vote

^40 by Natalia Przybysz ^41 by LemON ^42 by Edyta Górniak ^43 by Ania Rusowicz ^44 by Maanam ^45 by Brodka ^46 by Kayah ^47 by Natalia Szroeder (feat. Ralph Kaminski)

Non-competition performances
Order	Performer	Song
19.1	Lanberry	"Cyrk"
19.2	Kwiat Jabłoni	"Burza"
20.1	Arek Kłusowski	"Chłopak z sąsiedztwa"
20.2	Kwiat Jabłoni	"Od nowa"

=== Week 2: The Quarterfinals – Top 12 Performances (November 16) ===
Live Playoffs results
Episode & Date	Coach	Order	Contestant	Song	Result
Episode 21 (Saturday, November 16, 2024)	Tomson & Baron	1	Natalia Tul	"I'm with You"	Eliminated
Episode 21 (Saturday, November 16, 2024)	Tomson & Baron	2	Kacper Andrzejewski	"Nogi na stół" ^{48}	Public's vote
Episode 21 (Saturday, November 16, 2024)	Tomson & Baron	3	Julia Konik-Rańda	"Mamma Knows Best"	Tomson & Baron's choice
Episode 21 (Saturday, November 16, 2024)	Michał Szpak	1	Mikołaj Przybylski	"Rocket Man"	Public's vote
Episode 21 (Saturday, November 16, 2024)	Michał Szpak	2	Klaudia Stelmasiak	"I Put a Spell on You"	Michał's choice
Episode 21 (Saturday, November 16, 2024)	Michał Szpak	3	Bartłomiej Michałek	"Wariatka tańczy" ^{49}	Eliminated
Episode 22 (Saturday, November 16, 2024)
Episode 22 (Saturday, November 16, 2024)	Kuba Badach	1	Maciej Rumiński	"Aleja gwiazd" ^{50}	Kuba's choice
Episode 22 (Saturday, November 16, 2024)	Kuba Badach	2	Anna Iwanek	"Dzieci malarzy" ^{51}	Public's vote
Episode 22 (Saturday, November 16, 2024)	Kuba Badach	3	Adrianna Ropela	"Supermenka" ^{52}	Eliminated
Episode 22 (Saturday, November 16, 2024)	Lanberry	1	Aleksandra Leśniewicz	"It's a Man's Man's Man's World"	Eliminated
Episode 22 (Saturday, November 16, 2024)	Lanberry	2	Yaroslav Rohalskyi	"Story of My Life"	Lanberry's choice
Episode 22 (Saturday, November 16, 2024)	Lanberry	3	Izabela Płóciennik	"Skyfall"	Public's vote

^48 by Mrozu (feat. Jarecki) ^49 by Maryla Rodowicz ^50 by Zdzisława Sośnicka ^51 by Natalia Przybysz ^52 by Kayah

Non-competition performances
Order	Performer	Song
21.1	Michał Szpak	"Bondage"
21.2	Wiktor Dyduła	"Tam słońce, gdzie my"
22.1	Natasza	"Ostatni raz"
22.2	Wiktor Dyduła	"Szybkie tempo"

=== Week 3: Semi-finals (November 23) ===
In the semi-finals (when the team is made up of two contestants), each coach divides 100 points between their contestants and then everyone is credited with as many points as the percentage of votes they get from the viewers.

Semi-final results
Episode & Date	Coach	Order	Contestant	Cover song	Original song	Points			Result
Episode & Date	Coach	Order	Contestant	Cover song	Original song	Coach	Public	Total	Result
Episode 23 (Saturday, November 23, 2024)	Lanberry	1	Izabela Płóciennik	"Niech żyje bal" ^{53}	"Zaryzykuję"	60	76	136	Advanced
Episode 23 (Saturday, November 23, 2024)	Lanberry	2	Yaroslav Rohalskyi	"Dancing on My Own"	"Ne zabudu"	40	24	64	Eliminated
Episode 23 (Saturday, November 23, 2024)	Michał Szpak	1	Klaudia Stelmasiak	"lovely"	"Nie daj mi odejść"	49	20	69	Eliminated
Episode 23 (Saturday, November 23, 2024)	Michał Szpak	2	Mikołaj Przybylski	"Falling"	"Ten sam"	51	80	131	Advanced
Episode 24 (Saturday, November 23, 2024)	Kuba Badach	1	Anna Iwanek	"Proud Mary"	"Nie trzeba mi nic"	51	62	113	Advanced
Episode 24 (Saturday, November 23, 2024)	Kuba Badach	2	Maciej Rumiński	"Toy Soldiers"	"Dwuznaczności"	49	38	87	Eliminated
Episode 24 (Saturday, November 23, 2024)	Tomson & Baron	1	Julia Konik-Rańda	"All I Ask"	"Tańczę sama"	45	28	73	Eliminated
Episode 24 (Saturday, November 23, 2024)	Tomson & Baron	2	Kacper Andrzejewski	"Yesterday"	"Poznajmy się"	55	72	127	Advanced

^53 by Maryla Rodowicz

Non-competition performances
Order	Performer	Song
23.1	Afromental	"Story of My Life"
23.2	Margaret	"Mamy farta"
24.1	Sarsa	"Jak w filmie"
24.2	Margaret	"Tańcz głupia"

=== Week 4: The Finale (November 30) ===
During the grand finale, four contestants (one from each team) compete during three rounds. In the first round, the finalists sing a foreign language song followed by a duet with their coach; in the second round, the repertoire consists of Polish songs; in the third round, the remaining two contestants sing their own songs. The winner is chosen by viewers in the public's voting. Voting is divided into three rounds; after each round, the contestant with the fewest number of votes is eliminated.

Final results
Episode & Date	Coach	Order	Contestant	Song		Result
Episodes 25 & 26 (Saturday, November 30, 2024)	Lanberry	1	Izabela Płóciennik	Duet with coach	"Creep"	Fourth place
Episodes 25 & 26 (Saturday, November 30, 2024)	Lanberry	1	Izabela Płóciennik	English song	"All by Myself"	Fourth place
Episodes 25 & 26 (Saturday, November 30, 2024)	Lanberry	1	Izabela Płóciennik	Polish song	—N/a	Fourth place
Episodes 25 & 26 (Saturday, November 30, 2024)	Lanberry	1	Izabela Płóciennik	Original song	—N/a	Fourth place
Episodes 25 & 26 (Saturday, November 30, 2024)	Kuba Badach	2	Anna Iwanek	Duet with coach	"Love Never Felt So Good"	Winner
Episodes 25 & 26 (Saturday, November 30, 2024)	Kuba Badach	2	Anna Iwanek	English song	"All I Want"	Winner
Episodes 25 & 26 (Saturday, November 30, 2024)	Kuba Badach	2	Anna Iwanek	Polish song	"Ostatni" ^{54}	Winner
Episodes 25 & 26 (Saturday, November 30, 2024)	Kuba Badach	2	Anna Iwanek	Original song	"Nie trzeba mi nic"	Winner
Episodes 25 & 26 (Saturday, November 30, 2024)	Michał Szpak	3	Mikołaj Przybylski	Duet with coach	"Sorry Seems to Be the Hardest Word"	Runner-up
Episodes 25 & 26 (Saturday, November 30, 2024)	Michał Szpak	3	Mikołaj Przybylski	English song	"Say Something"	Runner-up
Episodes 25 & 26 (Saturday, November 30, 2024)	Michał Szpak	3	Mikołaj Przybylski	Polish song	"Dla ciebie" ^{55}	Runner-up
Episodes 25 & 26 (Saturday, November 30, 2024)	Michał Szpak	3	Mikołaj Przybylski	Original song	"Ten sam"	Runner-up
Episodes 25 & 26 (Saturday, November 30, 2024)	Tomson & Baron	4	Kacper Andrzejewski	Duet with coaches	"Calling You"	Third place
Episodes 25 & 26 (Saturday, November 30, 2024)	Tomson & Baron	4	Kacper Andrzejewski	English song	"Purple Rain"	Third place
Episodes 25 & 26 (Saturday, November 30, 2024)	Tomson & Baron	4	Kacper Andrzejewski	Polish song	"Początek" ^{56}	Third place
Episodes 25 & 26 (Saturday, November 30, 2024)	Tomson & Baron	4	Kacper Andrzejewski	Original song	—N/a	Third place

^54 by Edyta Bartosiewicz ^55 by Myslovitz ^56 by Krzysztof Zalewski (feat. Kortez & Dawid Podsiadło)

Non-competition performances
Order	Performer	Song
25.1	Kuba Badach	"Na drodze do wspomnień"
25.2	Natalia Przybysz	"Miód"
25.3	Igo	"Helena"
26.1	Jan Górka	"Bezalkoholove"
26.2	Igo	"Wiatr"

== Results summary of live shows ==
=== Color key ===
Results color key
Winner	Saved by their coach
Runner-up	Saved by the public
Third place	Advanced to the Finale with the most points
Fourth place	Eliminated

Coaches color key
Team Tomson & Baron
Team Lanberry
Team Kuba
Team Michał

=== Overall ===
Live shows results per week
Contestant	Week 1	Week 2	Week 3	Final
Anna Iwanek	Safe	Safe	Advanced	Winner
Mikołaj Przybylski	Safe	Safe	Advanced	Runner-up
Kacper Andrzejewski	Safe	Safe	Advanced	Third place
Izabela Płóciennik	Safe	Safe	Advanced	Fourth place
Julia Konik-Rańda	Safe	Safe	Eliminated	Eliminated (Week 3)
Klaudia Stelmasiak	Safe	Safe	Eliminated	Eliminated (Week 3)
Maciej Rumiński	Safe	Safe	Eliminated	Eliminated (Week 3)
Yaroslav Rohalskyi	Safe	Safe	Eliminated	Eliminated (Week 3)
Adrianna Ropela	Safe	Eliminated	Eliminated (Week 2)	
Aleksandra Leśniewicz	Safe	Eliminated	Eliminated (Week 2)	
Bartłomiej Michałek	Safe	Eliminated	Eliminated (Week 2)	
Natalia Tul	Safe	Eliminated	Eliminated (Week 2)	
Alicja Kalinowska	Eliminated	Eliminated (Week 1)		
Iga Ośko	Eliminated	Eliminated (Week 1)		
Julia Jadczyszyn	Eliminated	Eliminated (Week 1)		
Maciej Kita	Eliminated	Eliminated (Week 1)		

== Contestants who appeared on previous seasons or TV shows ==
- Kacper Andrzejewski auditioned for season 3 of the show but didn't get a chair turn.
- Aleksandra Leśniewicz auditioned for season 7 of the show and was eliminated during the Battles round.
- Patrycja Ciborowska auditioned for season 8 of the show and was eliminated during the Knockout round.
- Julia Jadczyszyn auditioned for season 14 of the show but didn't get a chair turn.
- Kinga Wołoszyn competed on season 3 of The Voice Kids and was eliminated during the Battles round.
- Natalia Smaś competed on season 3 of The Voice Kids and was eliminated during the Battles round.
- Wiktoria Kuczyńska competed on season 4 of The Voice Kids and was eliminated during the Battles round.
- Zuzanna Górecka competed on season 5 of The Voice Kids and was eliminated during the Battles round.
- Patrycja Ciborowska previously participated in the eighth season of the show and joined Michał Szpak's team, but was eliminated in the Knockout round.
- Alicja Kalinowska competed on season 2 as a part of a band called Soul City of X Factor and was eliminated during the quarter-final. She competed also on season 3 as a part of a band Poprzytula. They were eliminated during the Judges' houses elimination.
- Weronika Gabryelczyk competed on season 5 of Idol.
- Paweł Mosek competed on season 8 of Must Be the Music.
- Kuba Anusiewicz competed on season 6 of Mam talent! and was eliminated during the semi-finals. He also participated in music talent show for kids Hit, Hit, Hurra.
- Izabela Płóciennik competed on season 7 of Mam talent! and was eliminated during the semi-finals.
- Yaroslav Rohalskyi competed on season 5 of Holos Dity and was eliminated during the knockouts.
- Bartłomiej Michałek competed on season 19 of "Deutschland sucht den Superstar" and was eliminated in the second Recallround.
