= David Kushner (singer-songwriter) =

American musician (born 2000)

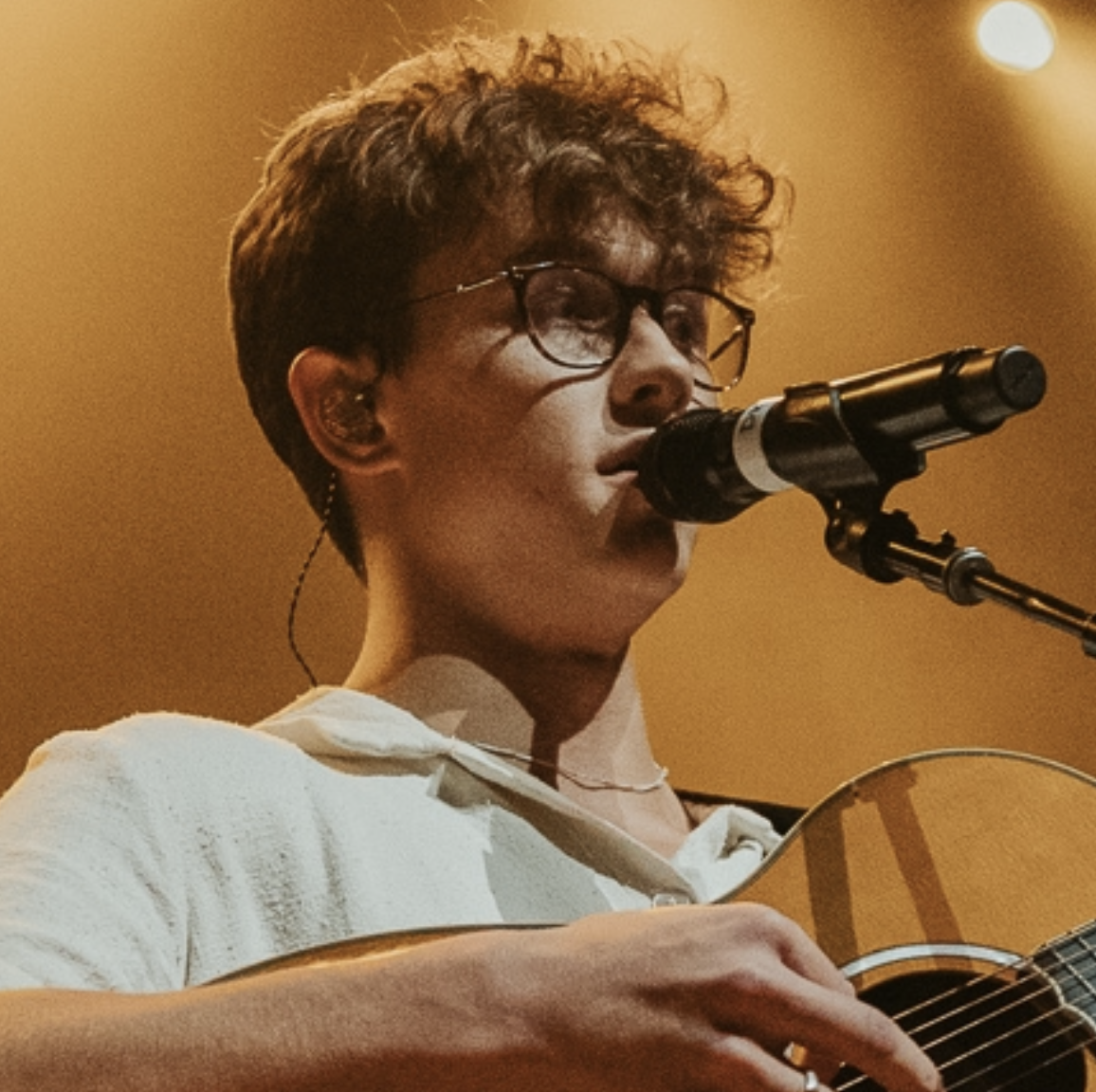
- Kushner in 2022

Background information
- Born: David Alan Kushner II; September 6, 2000 (age 26); Chicago, Illinois, U.S.
- Occupation: Singer-songwriter
- Instruments: Vocals, guitar
- Years active: 2021–present
- Website: www.davidkushnermusic.com

David Alan Kushner II (born September 6, 2000) is an American singer-songwriter. Raised in the suburbs of Chicago, Illinois, he moved to Los Angeles, California, and began releasing music. Kushner's song "Miserable Man" (2022) went viral on TikTok and peaked at number 11 on the charts in Norway and number 19 in Ireland, additionally reaching the top 40 in Australia, New Zealand, and the United Kingdom. Along with the single "Mr. Forgettable", it appeared on his debut extended play Footprints I Found (2022). Kushner received 556 million streams within a year of releasing music.

His song "Daylight" was released on April 14, 2023, and also gained huge traction on TikTok; the song would appear on his debut album The Dichotomy (2024). Kushner has served as the opening act for one of Lauv's tours. He headlined the Daylight 2.0 tour.

== Life and career ==
Kushner was raised in the suburbs of Chicago, Illinois. After realizing he could sing after finishing twelfth grade, he began writing songs with a close friend while living in Florida. Kushner played the guitar and taught himself music. Although never using a vocal coach, Kushner released the single "Miserable Man" in January 2022, which went viral on TikTok. The song peaked at number 11 on the charts in Norway and number 19 in Ireland, additionally reaching the top 40 in Australia, New Zealand, and the United Kingdom. Manny Patston of Happy commented: "He really, really cares about music. You can tell from his sheer excitement [...] I'm sure Kushner's youthful energy, magnetism, and blessed DNA will result in flocks of adoration".

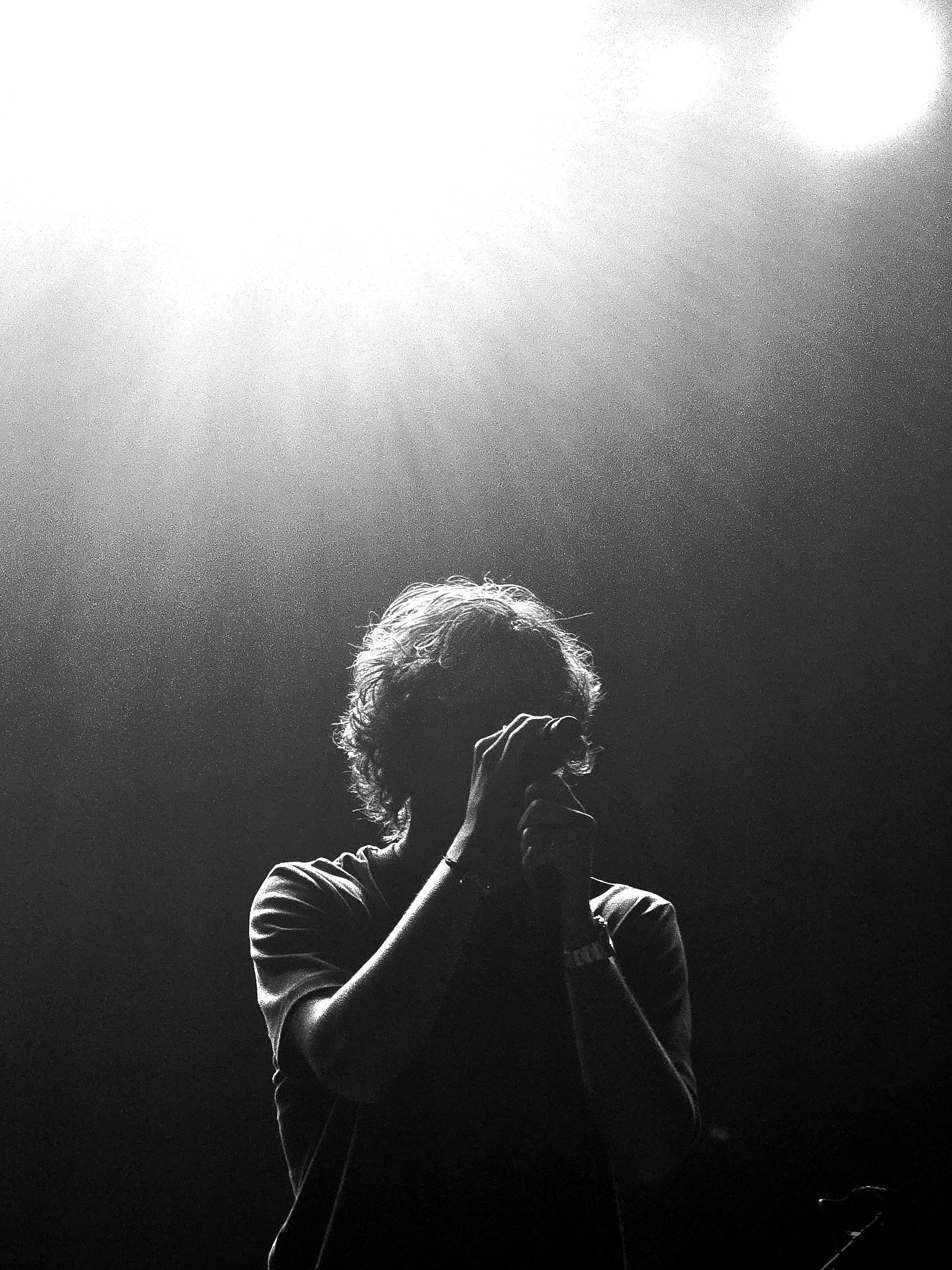
David Kushner performing at Brixton Academy in London, 2025

Along with the single "Mr. Forgettable", it appeared on his debut extended play Footprints I Found (2022). "Mr. Forgettable", written from the perspective of an Alzheimer's patient, also gained attention on TikTok, with some users expressing being forgotten by family members and others relating it to mental illness. Kushner accumulated 556 million streams within a year of his released music, and toured with Lauv later on in the year. He released the single "Daylight" on April 14, 2023. Kushner created a TikTok trend, called "You look happier; what happened", to accompany its release. The trend, which showcased people posting a photo of themselves smiling and looking content, and then pointing the camera at their partner to indicate they were the reason why, gained traction. He commented on his success on TikTok: "TikTok has played the biggest role in my music career. It started as a fun thing. I definitely had not planned to market my music [... but after the unexpected success] I knew that TikTok would be a powerful tool to be able to connect with new people." Kushner served as the opening act for Dean Lewis' the Future Is Bright Tour in April, and was scheduled to open for Lewis Capaldi on the July 1, 2023, date of his Broken by Desire to Be Heavenly Sent Tour in Chepstow, Monmouthshire.

Kushner was due to tour Australia and New Zealand for the first time in November 2023, but was forced to cancel the tour at short notice due to "unforeseen circumstances".

In May 2024, it was announced that Kushner was the Grand Prize winner of the 2023 International Songwriting Competition (ISC) for the song "Daylight."

In late 2024, he announced plans for a single, titled "Empty Bench". The single was released on December 6, 2024.

In early 2025, he began releasing teasers for a song titled "Breathe In, Breathe Out". The song was released on January 31, 2025. His second extended play, 20 Years from Now, was released on February 14, 2025.

His second album, Devotion, was released on November 13, 2026.

== Personal life ==
Kushner is Christian, and the content of his music is influenced by his faith. In a 2023 interview, he said, "My faith in God has been a foundational thing in my life. Although sometimes things can get challenging if I'm being completely honest, I have learned that it's okay. [...] I don't really get caught up with any scrutiny. I embrace my faith and write music that I think will speak to people." He is dating TikTok influencer Nicole Mitchell, with whom he posted a TikTok to promote "Daylight".

In March 2025, Kushner cancelled the remaining dates of his UK and Europe tour due to mental health issues, writing on Instagram that he "need[s] to step back and focus on getting better". Kushner has spoken openly about his issues with mental health and anxiety, and has revealed that he suffers from a tic disorder, stating that it started as a vocal tic and has since "progressed", though when he is making music, his symptoms almost disappear.

== Discography ==
=== Studio albums ===
| Title | Details | Peak chart positions | | | | | | | | | Certifications |
| Title | Details | US | AUT | BEL (FL) | LTU | NLD | NOR | SCT | UK | UK C&G | Certifications |
|---|---|---|---|---|---|---|---|---|---|---|---|
| The Dichotomy | Released: August 30, 2024; Label: Miserable Music Group; Formats: CD, LP, digital download, streaming | 146 | 72 | 97 | 97 | 74 | 22 | 37 | 74 | 1 | RIAA: Gold; MC: Gold |
| Devotion | Releasing: November 13, 2026; Label: Miserable; Formats: CD, LP, digital download, streaming | — | — | — | — | — | — | — | — | — | |

=== Extended plays ===
| Title | EP details | Peak chart positions | | |
| Title | EP details | BEL (FL) | LTU | SWI |
|---|---|---|---|---|
| Footprints I Found | Released: September 16, 2022; Label: Independent; Formats: Digital download, streaming, LP | 114 | 68 | 93 |
| 20 Years from Now | Released: February 14, 2025; Label: Miserable Music Group; Formats: Digital download, streaming | — | — | — |
"—" denotes a song that did not chart or was not released in that territory.

=== Singles ===
List of singles, showing year released, selected chart positions and album name
| Title | Year | Peak chart positions | | | | | | | | | | Certifications | Album |
| Title | Year | US | AUS | CAN | IRL | NLD | NOR | NZ | SWI | UK | WW | Certifications | Album |
|---|---|---|---|---|---|---|---|---|---|---|---|---|---|
| "ILY" | 2021 | — | — | — | — | — | — | — | — | — | — | | Non-album singles |
| "To Let You Go" | 2021 | — | — | — | — | — | — | — | — | — | — | | Non-album singles |
| "Thank You" | 2021 | — | — | — | — | — | — | — | — | — | — | | Non-album singles |
| "Love You from Far Away" | 2021 | — | — | — | — | — | — | — | — | — | — | | Non-album singles |
| "Miserable Man" | 2022 | — (Note: "Miserable Man" did not enter the Billboard Hot 100, but peaked at number 23 on the Bubbling Under Hot 100 chart.) | 36 | 68 | 19 | 57 | 11 | 31 | 46 | 39 | 149 | RIAA: Gold; ARIA: Gold; BPI: Silver; MC: Platinum; RMNZ: Gold | Footprints I Found |
| "Mr. Forgettable" | 2022 | — | — | — | 43 | — | — | — | — | 73 | — | RIAA: Platinum; ARIA: Gold; BPI: Silver; MC: Platinum; RMNZ: Platinum | Footprints I Found |
| "Burn" | 2022 | — | — | — | — | — | — | — | — | — | — | MC: Gold; RMNZ: Gold | Footprints I Found |
| "Elk Grove" | 2023 | — | — | — | — | — | — | — | — | — | — | | Non-album single |
| "Daylight" | 2023 | 33 | 4 | 6 | 2 | 1 | 2 | 1 | 1 | 2 | 11 | RIAA: 3× Platinum; ARIA: 3× Platinum; BPI: 2× Platinum; IFPI SWI: Platinum; MC: 6× Platinum; NVPI: Gold; RMNZ: 3× Platinum | The Dichotomy |
| "Dead Man" | 2023 | — | — | — | — | — | — | — (Note: "Dead Man" did not enter the NZ Top 40 Singles Chart, but peaked at number 26 on the NZ Hot Singles Chart.) | — | — | — | | The Dichotomy |
| "Skin and Bones" | 2024 | 70 | 84 | 28 | 40 | — (Note: "Skin and Bones" did not enter the Dutch Single Top 100, but peaked at number seven on the Single Tip chart.) | 19 | — (Note: "Skin and Bones" did not enter the NZ Top 40 Singles Chart, but peaked at number two on the NZ Hot Singles Chart.) | 22 | 36 | 76 | RIAA: Gold; MC: Gold | The Dichotomy |
| "In My Bones" (with Lost Frequencies) | 2024 | — | — | — | — | — | — | — | — | — | — | | Non-album single |
| "Hero" | 2024 | — | — | — | — | — | — | — | — | — | — | | The Dichotomy |
| "Humankind" | 2024 | — (Note: "Humankind" did not enter the Billboard Hot 100, but peaked at No. 15 on the Billboard Hot Christian Songs) | — | — | — | — | — | — | — | — | — | | The Dichotomy |
| "Empty Bench" | 2024 | — | — | — | — | — | — | — | — | — | — | | 20 Years from Now |
| "Breathe In, Breathe Out" | 2025 | — | — | — | — | — | — | — (Note: "Breathe In, Breathe Out" did not enter the NZ Top 40 Singles Chart, but peaked at number 35 on the NZ Hot Singles Chart.) | — | — | — | | 20 Years from Now |
| "Heaven's Sirens" | 2025 | — (Note: "Heaven's Sirens" did not enter the Billboard Hot 100, but peaked at No. 50 on the Billboard Hot Christian Songs) | — | — | — | — | — | — | — | — | — | | Non-album singles |
| "Dirty Dog" | 2025 | — | — | — | — | — | — | — | — | — | — | | Non-album singles |
| "Bittersweet Dreams" | 2025 | — | — | — | — | — | — | — | — | — | — | | Non-album singles |
| "Electrified" | 2026 | — | — | — | — | — | — | — | — | — | — | | Devotion |
| "By Any Means" (with The Isley Brothers) | 2026 | — | — | — | — | — | — | — | — | — | — | | Non-album single |
| "Ritual" | 2026 | — | — | — | — | — | — | — | — | — | — | | Devotion |
"—" denotes a song that did not chart or was not released in that territory.

=== Other charted songs ===
List of songs, showing year released, selected chart positions and album name
| Title | Year | Peak chart positions | | | Album |
| Title | Year | US Alt | US Christ | NZ Hot | Album |
|---|---|---|---|---|---|
| "Darkerside" | 2024 | 20 | 22 | 35 | The Dichotomy |

=== Other credits ===
- Hayd – "Don't Go, Don't Leave" (2022; writer)
