= Footprints I Found =

EP by David Kushner
- Released: September 16, 2022
- Genres: Pop; rock
- Length: 21:33
- Label: Independent
- Producers: David Kushner; Abe Parker; Alexander 23; Steve Rusch; Sarcastic Sounds; Hayd

David Kushner chronology
Footprints I Found (2022)	The Dichotomy (2024)

Singles from Footprints I Found
- 1. "Miserable Man" Released: January 7, 2022; 2. "Mr. Forgettable" Released: March 4, 2022; 3. "Burn" Released: June 24, 2022

Footprints I Found is the debut extended play by American singer-songwriter David Kushner. It was released independently on September 16, 2022. The EP reached number 114 on the Ultratop Albums chart, number 68 on the Lithuanian Albums chart, and number 93 on the Swiss Albums chart. It was released to digital download, streaming, and LP formats.

Three of the songs off the EP were released as singles, "Miserable Man", "Mr. Forgettable", and "Burn". "Miserable Man" reaching the top 50 on the charts of six countries, Australia, Ireland, Norway, New Zealand, Switzerland, and United Kingdom. The song was certified gold by RIAA, ARIA, and MC, and certified silver by BPI.

== Track listing ==
Footprints I Found track listing
No.	Title	Writer(s)	Producer(s)	Length
1.	"Cigarettes"	David Kushner; Jeremy Fedryk; Hayden Hubers; Jonah Kagen	Kushner; Sarcastic Sounds, Hayden Hubers	2:54
2.	"Burn"	Kushner; Fedryk; Hubers	Kushner; Hayd; Sarcastic Sounds; Steve Rusch	2:59
3.	"Cannon Beach"	Kushner; Jesse Fink; Noah Kahan	Kushner; Steve Rusch	2:52
4.	"Mr. Forgettable"	Kushner; Alexander 23	Alexander 23	3:07
5.	"Look Back & Laugh"	Kushner; Fedryk; Hubers; Yaeow	Kushner; Sarcastic Sounds; Hayd	2:44
6.	"Miserable Man"	Kushner	Abe Parker; Kushner	3:52
7.	"oooWooo"	Kushner; Rusch	Kushner; Rusch	3:02
Total length:				21:33

== Charts ==
Chart performance for Footprints I Found
Chart (2022)	Peak position
Belgian Albums (Ultratop Flanders)	114
Lithuanian Albums (AGATA)	68
Swiss Albums (Schweizer Hitparade)	93
