= Skin & Bone =

Skin & Bone may refer to:

- Skin & Bone (album), a 1998 album by the Angels
- Skin and Bone, a 2007 album by Madi Diaz
- Skin & Bone (film), a 1996 American crime drama
- "Skin and Bone" (The Inside), a 2006 TV episode

== See also ==
- Skin and Bones (disambiguation)
