= Daylight (David Kushner song) =

2023 single by David Kushner

Single by David Kushner

from the album The Dichotomy
- Released: April 14, 2023
- Recorded: 2023
- Genre: Gothic pop
- Length: 3:32
- Label: Miserable
- Songwriters: David Kushner; Hayden Robert Hubers; Jeremy Fedryk; Josh Bruce Williams; Edison Boon Eason; Drake Jon Livingston Jr.
- Producer: Rob Kirwan

David Kushner singles chronology
"Elk Grove" (2023)	"Daylight" (2023)	"Dead Man" (2023)

Music video
- "Daylight" on YouTube

"Daylight" is a song by the American singer-songwriter David Kushner. Kushner wrote it with Hayden Robert Hubers, Jeremy Fedryk, Josh Bruce Williams, and Drake Jon Livingston Jr., and Rob Kirwan produced it. Miserable Music Group released it as the lead single from his debut studio album, The Dichotomy (2024), on April 14, 2023. An orchestral gothic pop ballad, it is inspired by Paul the Apostle's teachings and biblical allusions Kushner found inspirational as a child.

The song went viral on video-sharing service TikTok in 2023. In the United Kingdom, it debuted and peaked at number two on the Official Singles Chart, becoming Kushner's first top-10 single. The song reached number one in Latvia, the Netherlands, New Zealand, Poland, and Switzerland, and number four in Australia. Luke Shaw and Landon Juern directed the music video, which was released alongside it. The streaming service Spotify has recorded over 1.7 billion streams of the song as of Apr. 08, 2026.

== Background and release ==
After realizing he could sing after finishing 12th grade, David Kushner began writing songs with a close friend while living in Florida. He played the guitar and taught music to himself. Eventually, Kushner worked with a vocal coach and started writing songs he believed "will speak to people". He released the singles "Miserable Man" and "Mr. Forgettable", which preceded his debut extended play Footprints I Found.

Kushner wrote the song "Daylight" with Hayden Robert Hubers, Jeremy Fedryk, and Josh Bruce Williams. He described his inspiration for the song: "With my song 'Daylight,' I aim to convey the paradoxical desire for something that is simultaneously harmful to oneself, using elements of light and darkness, the lyrics 'Oh I love it and I hate it at the same time you and I drink the poison from the same vine' encapsulate this concept." One of the fastest songs Kushner ever wrote, its story is based on biblical allusions he found inspirational as a child. He created "Daylight" stimulated by Paul the Apostle's teachings about overcoming "evil forces" in the world, perceiving "darkness" as a ubiquitous concept that represents the "worst version of ourselves".

"Daylight" went viral on video-sharing service TikTok, after Kushner posted demo snippets and created a trend called "You look happier; what happened" leading up to its release. The snippet was used in more than 230,000 clips, and among other promotional efforts, he asked fans to send different options for its official single artwork. Miserable Music Group released the song as a single on April 14, 2023. It was serviced for radio airplay in Italy on April 28, 2023. "Daylight" was sent to adult album alternative radio stations in the United States on May 1, 2023. Daylight was used during a promo for Cody Rhodes vs Brock Lesnar III as its 2nd theme song for WWE's SummerSlam, reportedly because Cody had just recently joined TikTok.

== Composition ==
"Daylight" is three minutes and 32 seconds long. Rob Kirwan produced and programmed the song. He plays drums and synthesizer, Hubers plays piano, and Rick Hornby plays guitar. Jacob Morris mastered and mixed it.

"Daylight" is an eerie orchestral gothic pop ballad, on which Kushner projects deep baritone vocals. The Official Charts Company's George Griffiths described the song as reminiscent of the work of Bon Iver and Hozier and thought its meaning "helps it transcend to a wider audience, with the specifics of the song somewhat unclear". Robin Murray of Clash commented: "'Daylight' leans on that dulcet lyric, his word play shows a complex aspect to his personality. Playing with light and shade, the song utilises emotional depth, with Kushner's vivid vocal brooding with feeling."

Words and music for "Daylight" were written by Jeremy Fedryk, David Kushner, Hayden Hubers and Josh Bruce Williams. The song was originally published in the key of A Minor and starts with F, Dm, Am, F, Dm, C, F, Dm, C, F, Dm, C chord progression with lyrics "Telling myself I won't go there. Oh, but I know that I won't care. Try'n' to wash away all the blood I've spilt". The song has the tempo of a piano ballad.

== Commercial performance ==
"Daylight" peaked at number 33 on the US Billboard Hot 100 and was certified 3× Platinum by the RIAA. In Canada, the song debuted at number six on the Canadian Hot 100 and received a 6× Platinum certification from Music Canada. It entered at number three on the UK Singles Chart, becoming Kushner's first top-10 single, and reached number two the following week. "Daylight" was certified double platinum by the British Phonographic Industry. In Australia, the song charted at number four and earned a 3× Platinum certification from the Australian Recording Industry Association.

"Daylight" peaked at number one in New Zealand and received a 3× Platinum certification from Recorded Music NZ. The song reached the top five of national record charts, at number one in Latvia, the Netherlands, Poland, and Switzerland, number two in Austria, Belgium, the Czech Republic, Ireland, Lithuania, and Norway, number three in Lebanon and Slovakia, and number four in Germany. It earned a Diamond certification in Poland.

The song was used in the fourth episode of the Netflix docuseries NASCAR: Full Speed.

== Music video ==
Luke Shaw and Landon Juern directed the music video for "Daylight", which was released alongside it and features the elements fire, water, air, and ash.

The video starts with Kushner chopping wood in the forest. He is then shown walking with a boy down a church aisle, whose face (along with other people in the pews) has been blurred. Reaching the altar, Kushner pulls out a knife. Next, Kushner is shown outside, reaching out to a giant ink drop-like darkness in the sky. Afterwards, he is dragged into a dark room where people (also with blurred faces) throw stones at him. A brief shot shows Kushner in a room as rain falls inside. Finally, he is shown shaking hands with a burning man, setting his arm and the room they are in on fire. Throughout the video, scenes are intercut with Kushner in the forest, the church, and the dark room singing to the camera.

== Credits and personnel ==
- Rob Kirwan – producer, programming, drums, synthesizer
- David Kushner – songwriter
- Hayden Robert Hubers – songwriter, piano
- Josh Bruce Williams – songwriter
- Jeremy Fedryk – songwriter
- Rick Hornby – guitar
- Jacob Morris – mastering, mixing

== Charts ==
=== Weekly charts ===
Weekly chart performance for "Daylight"
Chart (2023–2024)	Peak position
Australia (ARIA)	4
Austria (Ö3 Austria Top 40)	2
Belgium (Ultratop 50 Flanders)	2
Belgium (Ultratop 50 Wallonia)	6
Canada (Canadian Hot 100)	6
Czech Republic Airplay (ČNS IFPI)	12
Czech Republic Singles Digital (ČNS IFPI)	2
Denmark (Tracklisten)	7
Finland (Suomen virallinen lista)	12
France (SNEP)	8
Germany (GfK)	4
Global 200 (Billboard)	11
Hungary (Single Top 40)	13
Hungary (Stream Top 40)	3
India International (IMI)	11
Ireland (IRMA)	2
Italy (FIMI)	35
Latvia (LaIPA)	1
Latvia Airplay (LaIPA)	8
Lebanon Airplay (Lebanese Top 20)	3
Lithuania (AGATA)	2
Luxembourg (Billboard)	13
Netherlands (Dutch Top 40)	7
Netherlands (Single Top 100)	1
New Zealand (Recorded Music NZ)	1
Norway (VG-lista)	2
Poland (Polish Airplay Top 100)	16
Poland (Polish Streaming Top 100)	1
Portugal (AFP)	17
San Marino (SMRTV Top 50)	44
Singapore (RIAS)	29
Slovakia Singles Digital (ČNS IFPI)	3
South Africa (TOSAC)	15
Sweden (Sverigetopplistan)	12
Switzerland (Schweizer Hitparade)	1
Turkey (Radiomonitor Türkiye)	10
UK Singles (Official Charts)	2
US Billboard Hot 100	33
US Adult Pop Airplay (Billboard)	12
US Hot Rock & Alternative Songs (Billboard)	4
US Pop Airplay (Billboard)	9
US Rock & Alternative Airplay (Billboard)	14
Vietnam (Vietnam Hot 100)	88

=== Year-end charts ===
2023 year-end chart performance for "Daylight"
Chart (2023)	Position
Australia (ARIA)	19
Austria (Ö3 Austria Top 40)	9
Belgium (Ultratop 50 Flanders)	3
Belgium (Ultratop 50 Wallonia)	7
Canada (Canadian Hot 100)	34
Denmark (Tracklisten)	69
Germany (GfK)	16
Global 200 (Billboard)	46
Hungary (Single Top 40)	49
Netherlands (Dutch Top 40)	41
Netherlands (Single Top 100)	15
New Zealand (Recorded Music NZ)	27
Poland (Polish Streaming Top 100)	6
Sweden (Sverigetopplistan)	40
Switzerland (Schweizer Hitparade)	6
UK Singles (OCC)	16
US Billboard Hot 100	62
US Hot Rock & Alternative Songs (Billboard)	19
US Mainstream Top 40 (Billboard)	46
US Rock Airplay (Billboard)	44

2024 year-end chart performance for "Daylight"
Chart (2024)	Position
Australia (ARIA)	93
Belgium (Ultratop 50 Flanders)	68
Belgium (Ultratop 50 Wallonia)	73
France (SNEP)	94
Germany (GfK)	100
Global 200 (Billboard)	57
Poland (Polish Streaming Top 100)	91
Portugal (AFP)	159
Switzerland (Schweizer Hitparade)	48
US Hot Rock & Alternative Songs (Billboard)	22

2025 year-end chart performance for "Daylight"
Chart (2025)	Position
Belgium (Ultratop 50 Flanders)	188

== Certifications ==
Certifications for "Daylight"
Region	Certification	Certified units/sales
Australia (ARIA)	3× Platinum	210,000^{‡}
Belgium (BRMA)	2× Platinum	80,000^{‡}
Brazil (Pro-Música Brasil)	3× Diamond	480,000^{‡}
Canada (Music Canada)	6× Platinum	480,000^{‡}
Denmark (IFPI Danmark)	Platinum	90,000^{‡}
France (SNEP)	Diamond	333,333^{‡}
Germany (BVMI)	Platinum	600,000^{‡}
Italy (FIMI)	Platinum	100,000^{‡}
Netherlands (NVPI)	Gold	40,000^{‡}
New Zealand (RMNZ)	3× Platinum	90,000^{‡}
Poland (ZPAV)	Diamond	250,000^{‡}
Portugal (AFP)	3× Platinum	30,000^{‡}
Spain (Promusicae)	Platinum	60,000^{‡}
Switzerland (IFPI Switzerland)	Platinum	20,000^{‡}
United Kingdom (BPI)	2× Platinum	1,200,000^{‡}
United States (RIAA)	3× Platinum	3,000,000^{‡}
Streaming
Greece (IFPI Greece)	Platinum	2,000,000^{†}
^{‡} Sales+streaming figures based on certification alone.^{†} Streaming-only figures based on certification alone.

== Release history ==
Release dates and format(s) for "Daylight"
Region	Date	Format	Label	Ref.
Various	April 14, 2023	Digital download; streaming	Miserable	
Italy	April 28, 2023	Radio airplay	Universal	
United States	May 1, 2023	Adult album alternative	Virgin	
