= The Dichotomy =

Studio album by David Kushner
- Released: August 30, 2024
- Recorded: 2023–2024
- Genres: Pop; gothic pop
- Length: 55:53
- Label: Miserable
- Producers: Evan Blair; Eren Cannata; Digital Farm Animals; Jon Hume; Rob Kirwan; Lydia Kitto; Ojivolta; One Love; Steve Rusch; Johnny Simpson; TMS; Jake Torrey

David Kushner chronology
Footprints I Found (2022)	The Dichotomy (2024)	20 Years From Now (2025)

Singles from The Dichotomy
- 1. "Daylight" Released: April 14, 2023; 2. "Dead Man" Released: September 22, 2023; 3. "Skin and Bones" Released: January 19, 2024; 4. "Hero" Released: May 10, 2024; 5. "Humankind" Released: June 21, 2024

The Dichotomy is the debut studio album by American singer-songwriter David Kushner. The album was released on August 30, 2024, through Kushner's independent music label Miserable Music Group. Five of the songs off the album were released as singles, "Daylight", "Dead Man", "Skin and Bones", "Hero", and "Humankind". The song "Darkerside" was not released as a single but also charted. The genre is considered to be pop and gothic pop. The album was released to digital download, streaming, CD, and LP formats.

The first single to be released from the album, "Daylight", achieved significant chart positions, hitting number 33 on the Billboard Hot 100, #1 in several countries, including the Netherlands, New Zealand, and Switzerland, and #4 in Australia. It additionally received multiplatinum certifications in several countries. The album was certified gold by Music Canada, on September 5, 2024.

== Track listing ==
The Dichotomy track listing
No.	Title	Writer(s)	Producer(s)	Length
1.	"No High"	David Alan Kushner; Delacey; Evan Blair	Blair	3:02
2.	"Poison"	Kushner; Jon Hume; Sean Douglas	Hume	3:02
3.	"Skin and Bones"	Kushner	Rob Kirwan	3:34
4.	"Hero"	Kushner; Scott Harris; Steve Rusch	Rusch	3:26
5.	"You and Me"	Kushner; Rusch	Rusch	3:00
6.	"Love Is Going to Kill Us"	Kushner; Eren Cannata; Justin Tranter	Cannata	2:56
7.	"Dead Man"	Kushner; Rusch	Rusch	4:34
8.	"Flesh x Blood"	Kushner; Gregory Hein; TMS	TMS	2:54
9.	"Sweet Oblivion"	Kushner; Hein; TMS	TMS	2:15
10.	"Buried at Sea"	Kushner; Johnny Simpson; Jake Torrey	Simpson; Torrey	3:44
11.	"Humankind"	Kushner; Douglas; Jeremy Dussolliet; Timothy Sommers	One Love	3:03
12.	"Universe"	Kushner; Justin Parker; Nick Gale; Simon Aldred; Lydia Kitto	Kirwan; Kitto; Digital Farm Animals	3:27
13.	"Heaven Sees"	Kushner; Rusch	Rusch	2:32
14.	"Darkerside"	Kushner; Raul Cubina; Harris; Mark Williams	Ojivolta	2:37
15.	"California Nights"	Kushner; Rusch	Rusch	3:39
16.	"Saving Your Soul"	Kushner; Zach Webb	Kirwan	4:28
17.	"Daylight"	Kushner; Drake Jon Livingston Jr.; Edison Boon Eason; Jeremy Fedryk; Hayden Robert Hubers; Josh Bruce Williams	Kirwan	3:32
Total length:				55:53

== Personnel ==
Credits are adapted from Tidal.

- David Kushner – performance
- Jacob "Biz" Morris – mastering (all tracks), mixing (tracks 1, 3–17)
- Jon Hume – mixing (2)
- Rob Kirwan – drums, synthesizer (3, 17); mixing (3)
- Sam Becker – cello, guitar (3)
- Scott Harris – piano (4), background vocals (14)
- Mischa Mandel – vocal production (4), vocal arrangement (7)
- Steve Rusch – acoustic guitar, bass, drums, electric guitar, organ, vocal production (4)
- Scott Goldbaum – guitar (7)
- Oliver Pash – acoustic guitar, synthesizer (12, 16); bass guitar, keyboards (12); electric guitar, piano (16)
- Mark Williams – acoustic guitar, bass guitar, keyboards (14)
- Raul Cubina – keyboards, programming, synthesizer (14)
- Robert Allaire – strings conducting (15)
- Rick Hornby – guitar (17)
- Hayden Robert Hubers – piano (17)

== Charts ==
Chart performance for The Dichotomy
Chart (2024)	Peak position
Austrian Albums (Ö3 Austria)	72
Belgian Albums (Ultratop Flanders)	97
Belgian Albums (Ultratop Wallonia)	99
Dutch Albums (Album Top 100)	74
French Albums (SNEP)	113
German Albums (Offizielle Top 100)	56
Lithuanian Albums (AGATA)	97
Norwegian Albums (VG-lista)	22
Polish Albums (ZPAV)	18
Scottish Albums (Official Charts)	37
Swiss Albums (Schweizer Hitparade)	55
UK Albums (Official Charts)	74
UK Christian & Gospel Albums (Official Charts)	1
US Billboard 200	146

== Certifications ==
Certifications for The Dichotomy
Region	Certification	Certified units/sales
Canada (Music Canada)	Gold	40,000^{‡}
United States (RIAA)	Gold	500,000^{‡}
^{‡} Sales+streaming figures based on certification alone.
