= Miserable Man =

2022 single by David Kushner

Single by David Kushner

from the album Footprints I Found
- Released: January 7, 2022
- Length: 3:52
- Label: EQT; Virgin
- Songwriter: David Kushner
- Producers: Abe Parker; David Kushner

David Kushner singles chronology
| "Love You From Far Away" (2021) | "Miserable Man" (2022) | "Mr. Forgettable" (2022) |

"Miserable Man" is a song by American singer-songwriter David Kushner, released as a single on January 7, 2022, through EQT Recordings and Virgin Records internationally. It was written by Kushner and co-produced by Kushner and Abe Parker. The song went viral on TikTok and subsequently reached the top 20 in Ireland and Norway, as well as the top 40 in Australia, New Zealand and the UK.

== Personnel ==
- David Kushner – vocals, production
- Abe Parker – mixing, production
- Alexander Wright – mastering

== Charts ==
Chart performance for "Miserable Man"
| Chart (2022) | Peak position |
|---|---|
| Australia (ARIA) | 36 |
| Austria (Ö3 Austria Top 40) | 68 |
| Canada (Canadian Hot 100) | 68 |
| Global 200 (Billboard) | 149 |
| Ireland (IRMA) | 19 |
| Netherlands (Single Top 100) | 57 |
| New Zealand (Recorded Music NZ) | 31 |
| Norway (VG-lista) | 11 |
| Sweden (Sverigetopplistan) | 63 |
| Switzerland (Schweizer Hitparade) | 46 |
| UK Singles (Official Charts) | 39 |
| US Bubbling Under Hot 100 Singles (Billboard) | 23 |

== Certifications ==
Certifications for "Miserable Man"
| Region | Certification | Certified units/sales |
|---|---|---|
| Australia (ARIA) | Gold | 35,000^{‡} |
| Canada (Music Canada) | Platinum | 80,000^{‡} |
| New Zealand (RMNZ) | Gold | 15,000^{‡} |
| United Kingdom (BPI) | Silver | 200,000^{‡} |
| United States (RIAA) | Gold | 500,000^{‡} |
^{‡} Sales+streaming figures based on certification alone.
