= Skin and Bones (David Kushner song) =

2024 single by David Kushner

Single by David Kushner

from the album The Dichotomy
- Released: January 27, 2024
- Length: 3:34
- Label: Miserable
- Songwriters: David Kushner; Brent Shows
- Producer: Rob Kirwan

David Kushner singles chronology
"Dead Man" (2023)	"Skin and Bones" (2024)	"In My Bones" (2024)

Music video
- "Skin and Bones" on YouTube

"Skin and Bones" is a song by American singer-songwriter David Kushner, released on January 19, 2024, as the third single from his debut studio album, The Dichotomy (2024). It was written by Kushner himself and Brent Shows, and produced by Rob Kirwan.

== Background ==
Kushner has stated, "'Skin and Bones' captures the electric tension of desire and redemption, exploring the thin line between ecstasy and salvation in the duality of love."

== Charts ==
Chart performance for "Skin and Bones"
Chart (2024)	Peak position
Australia (ARIA)	84
Austria (Ö3 Austria Top 40)	31
Canada (Canadian Hot 100)	28
Germany (GfK)	56
Global 200 (Billboard)	76
Ireland (IRMA)	40
Netherlands (Single Tip)	7
New Zealand Hot Singles (RMNZ)	2
Norway (VG-lista)	19
Sweden (Sverigetopplistan)	50
Switzerland (Schweizer Hitparade)	22
UK Singles (Official Charts)	36
US Billboard Hot 100	70
US Hot Rock & Alternative Songs (Billboard)	8

== Certifications ==
Certifications for "Skin and Bones"
Region	Certification	Certified units/sales
Brazil (Pro-Música Brasil)	Gold	20,000^{‡}
Canada (Music Canada)	Gold	40,000^{‡}
Poland (ZPAV)	Gold	25,000^{‡}
United States (RIAA)	Gold	500,000^{‡}
^{‡} Sales+streaming figures based on certification alone.
