= Marika (singer) =

Polish vocalist, songwriter and radio DJ (born 1980)

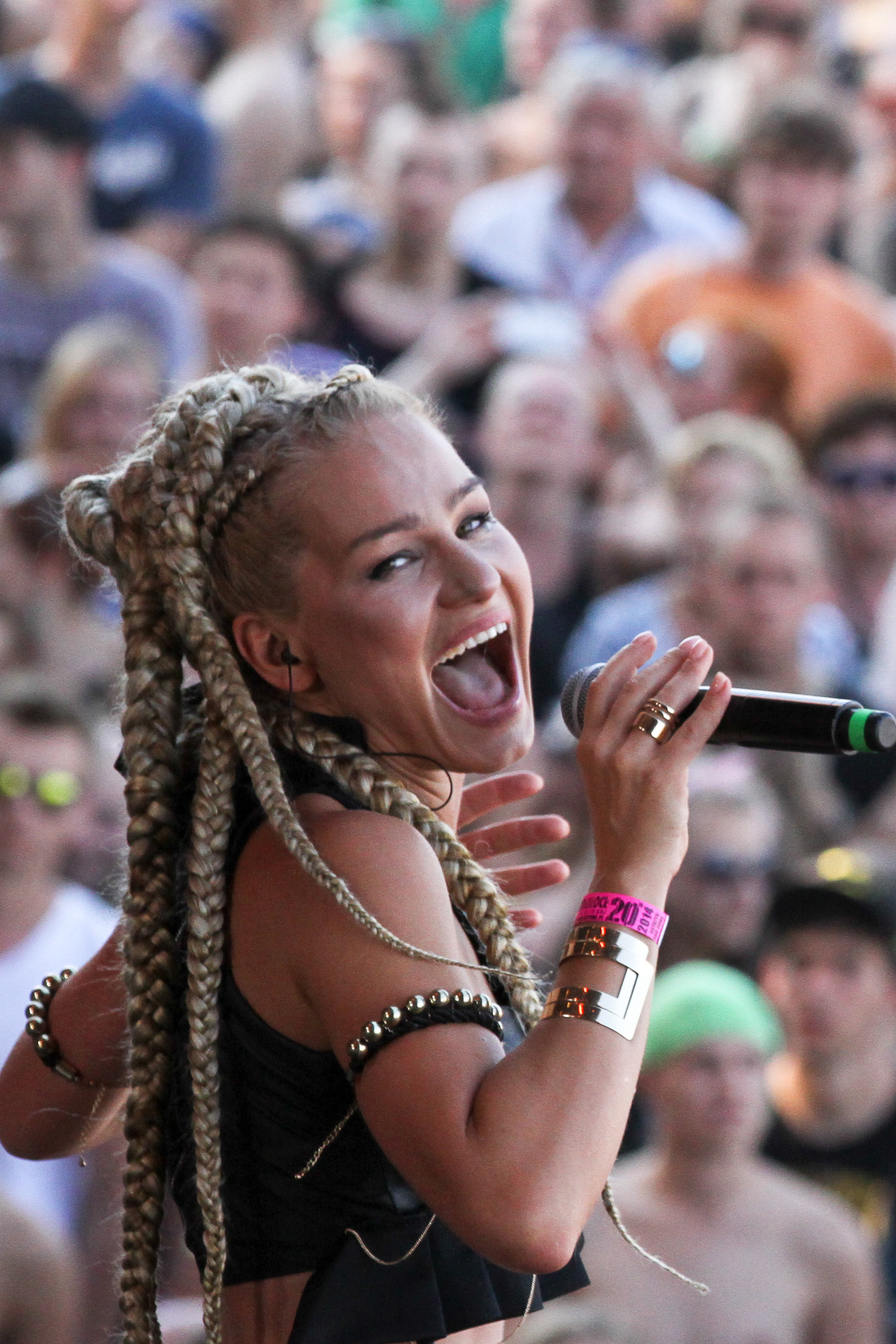
- Marika performing at the 20th Woodstock Festival Poland, 2014

Background information
- Also known as: Marika, Lady Marika
- Born: Marta Kosakowska; 14 December 1980 (age 45); Białystok, Poland
- Genres: Avant-pop, electronic, reggae, dancehall, soul, funk
- Occupations: Singer, songwriter, radio DJ
- Years active: 2002–present
- Labels: EMI Music Poland, Karrot Kommando, Warner Music Poland

Marika (born Marta Kosakowska on 14 December 1980) is a Polish vocalist, songwriter and radio DJ. Currently performing avant-pop, she was previously known for her Caribbean-inspired repertoire which incorporated reggae, dancehall, as well as funk and soul music. She was hailed "the First Lady of Polish dancehall" and was noted for energetic shows and conscious lyrics. She also had a short-lived but successful career as a prime time TV host in Poland.

== Career ==
Marika was born in Białystok, but grew up in the nearby Łomża. She studied Polonistics at the Adam Mickiewicz University in Poznań.

She debuted in 2002 as the vocalist of the sound system Bass Medium Trinity. The group released the album Mówisz i masz (Polish for You Say and You Have) in 2004, which was the first Polish-language album recorded on original Jamaican riddims. At the same time, Marika was a member of the band Breakbeat Propaganda. In 2005, she was performing as a soloist in a theatre project 12 ławek (12 Benches) in Gdynia, and supported Macy Gray during her concert in Warsaw's Congress Hall. In 2006, Marika participated in a Polish-German musical project Polski ogień (Polish Fire), for which she recorded two songs: "Siła ognia" (on "Doctor's Darling" riddim) and "What's Ya Flava" (on "Curefix" riddim).

In 2007, Marika released her debut solo single, "Moje serce" ("My Heart"), through Karrot Kommando. She then signed with Pomaton EMI and released her first solo album, Plenty, on 22 August 2008. It reached the top 20 in the Polish albums chart and met with favorable reviews. In October, she started hosting her own radio show called Nie tylko reggae (Not Only Reggae) on Radio Euro. The following year, Plenty was nominated for the Polish music award Fryderyk in the Hip-Hop/R&B Album of the Year category, and Marika received a nomination in the New Face of Phonography category. In the summer of 2009, the English-language track "So Sure" was released as the final single from Plenty, followed by an EP titled So Remixed, which featured a selection of remixes. In September 2009, Marika started another radio show, Towary kolonialne, on Roxy FM.

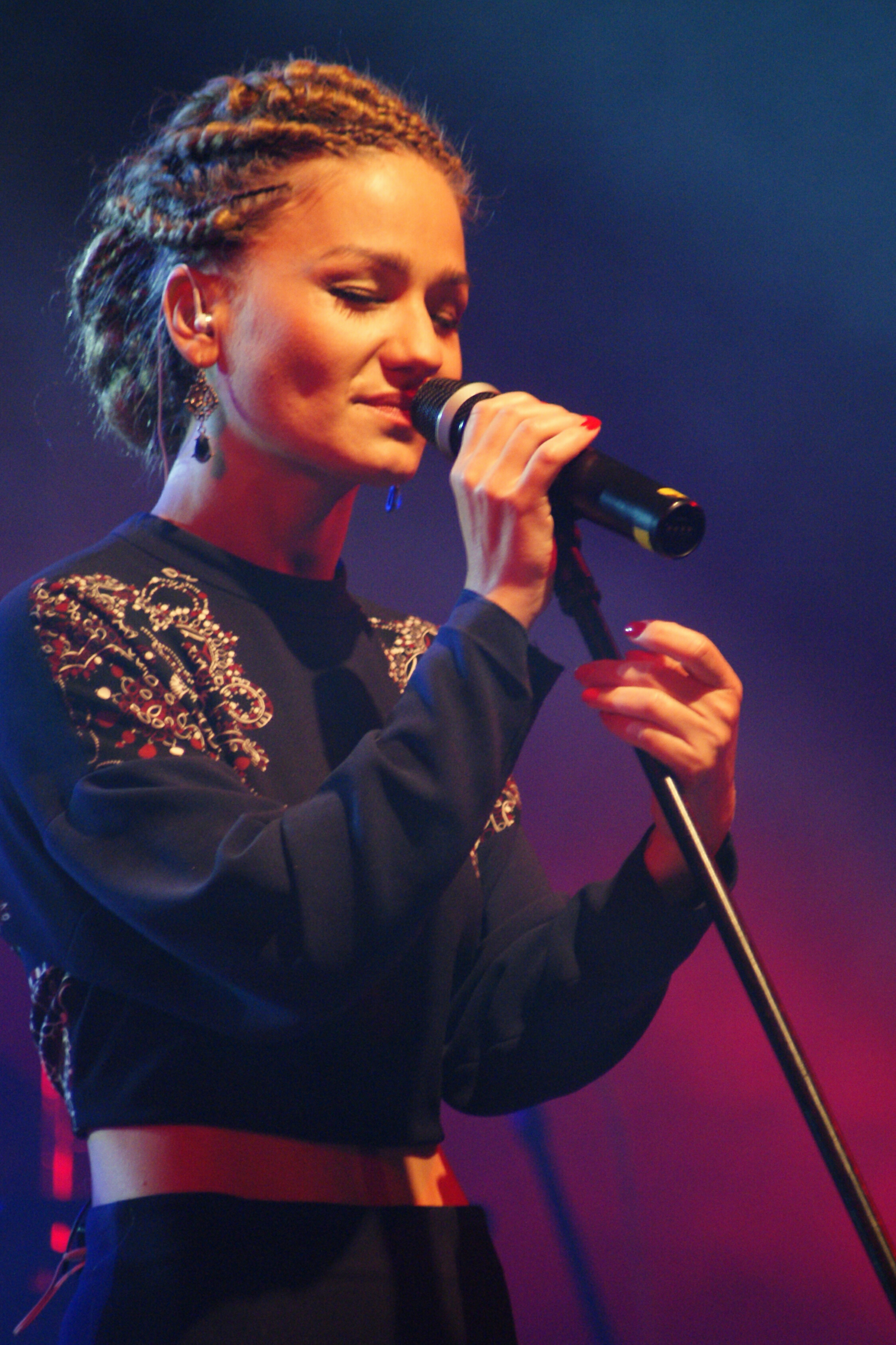
Marika live in 2013

On 8 June 2010, Marika released her second studio album titled Put Your Shoes On/Off. It consisted of two CDs: one with new material and another one with remixes. The first single from the album was "Uplifter". The album was another top 20 success and received positive reviews. On 4 July 2010, she performed in the same line-up with Nas and Damian Marley at the Open'er Festival in Gdynia. Put Your Shoes On/Off was nominated for the Fryderyk award in the Album of the Year - Hip-Hop/R&B/Reggae category. In mid-2011, Marika released a music video for the multilingual song "Esta Festa" (Portuguese for "It's a Party") in which she sings in Polish, English and Portuguese.

In 2012, she appeared on the compilation Morowe panny which was released to commemorate the Warsaw Uprising. In October 2012, Marika released her third album, Momenty, recorded with the band Spokoarmia. It spawned the popular songs "Baqaa" and "Widok". In May 2013, she released Chilli Zet Live Sessions, an album consisting of acoustic versions of songs from her previous CDs. From 2013 to mid-2014, she co-hosted three seasons of The Voice of Poland broadcast on TVP2, the Polish edition of the singing talent show The Voice. In autumn 2014, she so-hosted the show SuperSTARcie also on TVP2. In the meantime, she took part in two more historical projects, Panny wyklęte and Panny wyklęte: wygnane vol. 1.

On her next album, titled simply Marta Kosakowska, the singer shifted from reggae and dancehall towards electronic avant-pop. Released in October 2015, the album was preceded by the singles "Tabletki" and "A jeśli to ja", and was accompanied by Marika's radical change of image. It received positive reviews and charted within the top 40 in Poland. In 2016, she released the book Antydepresanty which consisted of lyrics, stories and black-and-white illustrations. She began recording the new album in 2017, and the following year released a remix of "Moje serce" to mark the 10th anniversary of the release of her debut album.

Marika focused on family life, but continued to perform regularly, and returned with the single "Jak na moje oko" in May 2020. In late 2022, she started releasing singles in quick successions, including "Patataj", "Kurtyny" and "Leć", leading to the release of her new, self-released album Cykl (Cycle) in April 2023.

== Private life ==
Marika divorced her first husband around the beginning of her solo career. She married her second husband in March 2016 and gave birth to their twin boys in early 2018.

At the turn of 2014 and 2015, Marika went through a spiritual awakening and started practicing Catholicism. She does, however, define herself as a "person of faith" rather than "religious".

She is a vegetarian.

Marika advocates the legalization of cannabis.

== Discography ==
=== Studio albums ===
Title	Album details	Peak chart positions
Title	Album details	POL
Plenty	Released: 22 August 2008; Label: EMI Music Poland	19
Put Your Shoes On/Off	Released: 8 June 2010; Label: EMI Music Poland	18
Momenty (with Spokoarmia)	Released: 20 October 2012; Label: Karrot Kommando	41
Chilli Zet Live Sessions	Released: 13 May 2013; Label: Karrot Kommando	41
Marta Kosakowska	Released: 23 October 2015; Label: Warner Music Poland	32
Cykl	Released: 13 April 2023; Label: self-released	–

=== Singles ===
Title	Year	Album
"Moje serce"	2007	Plenty
"Masz to"	2008	Plenty
"So Sure"	2009	Plenty
"Uplifter"	2010	Put Your Shoes On/Off
"Girlzz in Trance" (with Lukasz Borowiecki)	2010	Put Your Shoes On/Off
"Nieważne ile"	2011	Put Your Shoes On/Off
"Esta Festa"	2011	Put Your Shoes On/Off
"Someday" (Mothashipp feat. Marika and Lutan Fyah)	2011	Momenty
"Baqaa" (with Spokoarmia)	2012	Momenty
"Widok" (with Spokoarmia)	2012	Momenty
"Risk Risk" (with Spokoarmia)	2013	Momenty
"Tabletki" (with Xxanaxx)	2015	Marta Kosakowska
"A jeśli to ja" (with Gooral)	2015	Marta Kosakowska
"Niebieski ptak" (with Grubson)	2015	Marta Kosakowska
"1000 lamp"	2015	Marta Kosakowska
"Idę"	2016	Marta Kosakowska
"Moje serce 2k18"	2018	—N/a
"Jak na moje oko"	2020	Cykl
"Na teatralce" (with Envee)	2021	Estrada w sieci – Duety Vol. 1 (various artists compilation)
"Za dużo sosu" (with Szef Głodek)	2022	—N/a
"Szlagier" (Fabijański feat. Marika)	2022	Cukier (Fabijański album)
"Patataj"	2022	Cykl
"Kurtyny"	2022	Cykl
"Z roku na rok" (Arkadio with Marika)	2022	Tylko mnie nie gaście (Arkadio album)
"Leć"	2023	Cykl
"Euforia"	2023	Cykl
"Brokat"	2023	Cykl
"Mordy"	2023	Cykl
