= 1983 (TV series) =

Polish thriller drama television series

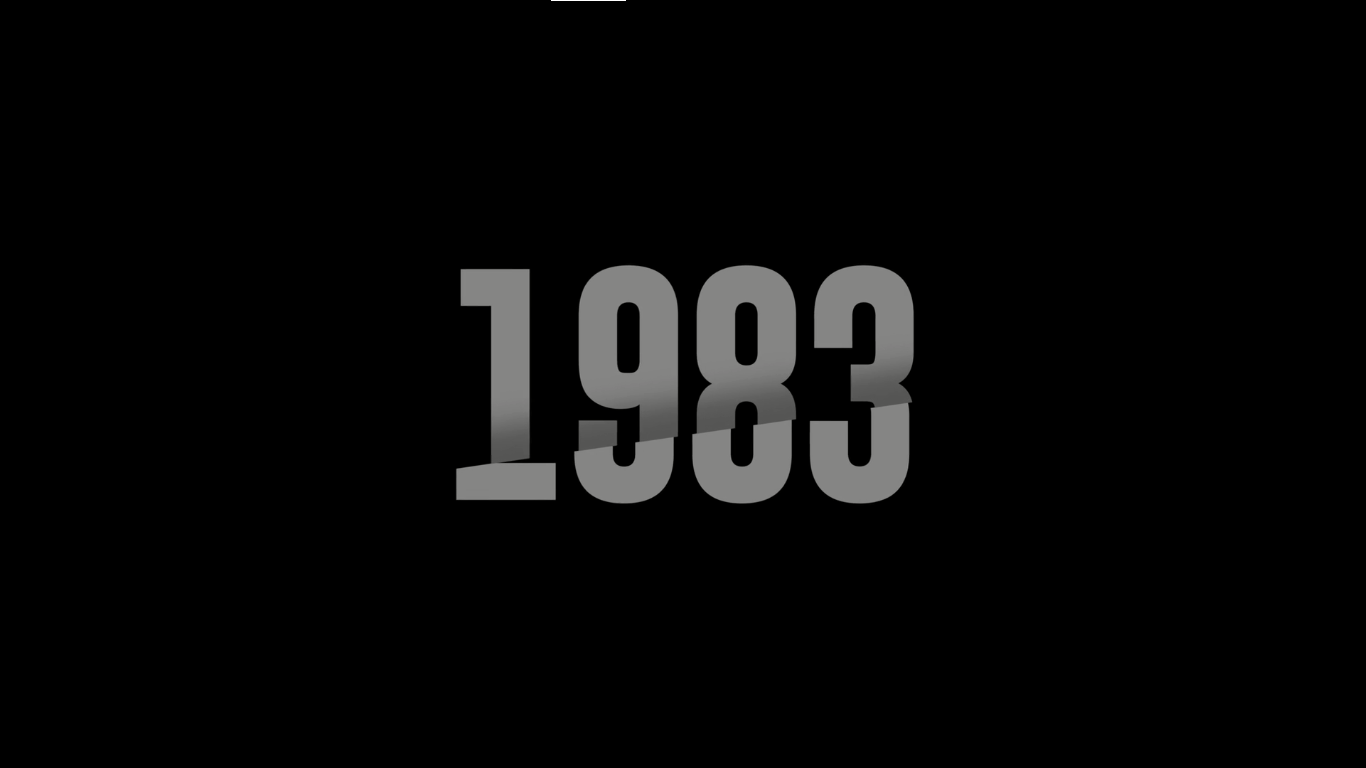
- Genre: Thriller drama
- Created by: Joshua Long
- Written by: Joshua Long
- Story by: Joshua Long; Maciej Musiał
- Directed by: Katarzyna Adamik; Olga Chajdas; Agnieszka Holland; Agnieszka Smoczyńska
- Starring: Maciej Musiał; Robert Więckiewicz; Michalina Olszańska; Zofia Wichłacz; Andrzej Chyra; Krzysztof Wach
- Country of origin: Poland
- Original languages: Polish; English; Russian; Vietnamese
- No. of seasons: 1
- No. of episodes: 8

Production
- Production companies: The Kennedy/Marshall Company; House Media Company

Original release
- Network: Netflix
- Release: November 30, 2018

1983 is a Polish thriller drama television series produced for and released by Netflix on 30 November 2018. The series, created and written by Joshua Long and based on an original idea by Long and Maciej Musiał, is set in an alternate timeline in which the fall of the communist Polish People's Republic never happened, and the Iron Curtain is still in place. It is Netflix's first Polish original series.

== Premise ==
The series is set in 2003; 20 years after a coordinated terrorist attack took place on multiple sites in Poland in 1983 which altered the course of history. The Iron Curtain (and probably the Berlin Wall) is still in place and the Cold War did not end. Law student Kajetan (Maciej Musiał) and Citizens' Militia investigator Anatol (Robert Więckiewicz) uncover a conspiracy that could potentially start a revolution.

== Setting ==
The story is set in a bleak and wintry depiction of Warsaw, characterized by a juxtaposition of deteriorating Soviet-era apartment blocks and modern, imposing government and police facilities. The state security apparatus employs advanced digital surveillance technologies, including the monitoring of mobile phone activity and the compilation of centralized databases that categorize citizens according to perceived levels of threat. Individuals are required to scan digital identification cards when entering government buildings, creating detailed records of their movements and interactions.

Political power is concentrated in the hands of the “Party,” an elite ruling class distinguished by privileged access to education, economic resources, and secure residential enclaves. Much of the broader population is portrayed as politically disengaged, instead focusing on consumer goods and forms of entertainment permitted by the authorities. Cultural censorship is widespread, particularly affecting literature originating from Western countries. Opposition to the regime is represented by the “Light Brigade,” a youth resistance group engaged in clandestine activities.

The narrative also envisions significant immigration from Indochina, especially from the Socialist Republic of Vietnam, contributing to the emergence of densely populated Asian districts. Certain nocturnal urban scenes evoke visual comparisons to the dystopian aesthetic associated with works such as Blade Runner. Despite the setting’s apparent historical links to communism, overt ideological symbols are largely absent. The governing system is instead depicted as an authoritarian state whose primary objective is the suppression of dissent and the comprehensive regulation of individual behavior.

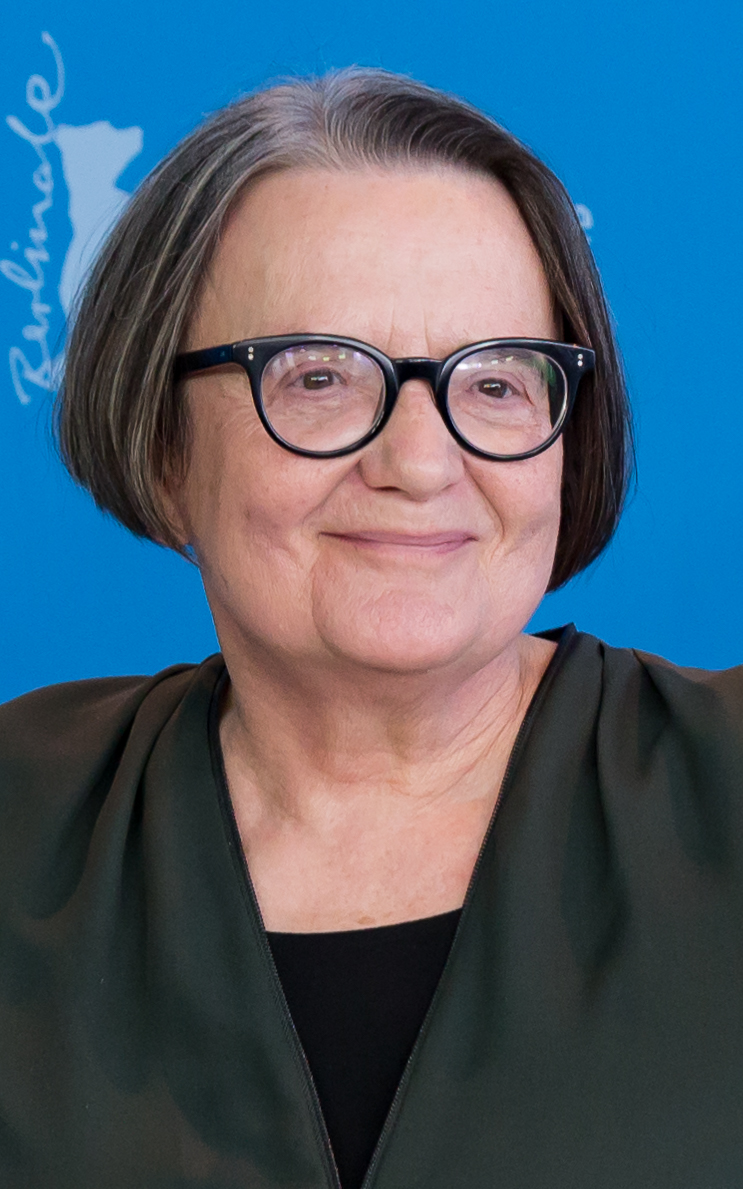
Agnieszka Holland, one of the series directors.

== Cast ==
=== Main ===
- Maciej Musiał as Kajetan Skowron
- Robert Więckiewicz as Anatol Janów
- Michalina Olszańska as Ofelia Ibrom
- Zofia Wichłacz as Karolina Lis
- Andrzej Chyra as Władysław Lis

=== Recurring ===
- Ewa Błaszczyk as Maria Gierowska
- Edyta Olszówka as Julia Stępińska
- Agnieszka Żulewska as Maja Skowron
- Wojciech Kalarus as Mikołaj Trojan
- Mirosław Zbrojewicz as Kazimierz Świętobór
- Patrycja Volny as Dana Rolbiecki
- Vu Le Hong as Bao Chu ("Uncle")
- Clive Russell as William Keating
- Mateusz Kościukiewicz as Kamil Zatoń

== Episodes ==
No.	Title	Directed by	Written by	Original release date
1	"Entanglement" "Uwikłanie"	Agnieszka Holland and Katarzyna Adamik	Joshua Long	November 30, 2018
It is set in 2003 in a totalitarian Poland, after Poland suffered a series of massive terrorist bombings in 1983. The Cold War never ended, so the Iron Curtain remains in place. A young law student and a jaded old detective are starting to discover evidence of a conspiracy and they learn about the Light Brigade, a resistance movement.
2	"Rollback"	Agnieszka Holland and Katarzyna Adamik	Joshua Long	November 30, 2018
3	"Alignment" "Układ"	Katarzyna Adamik	Joshua Long	November 30, 2018
4	"Blowback" "Reperkusje"	Katarzyna Adamik	Joshua Long	November 30, 2018
5	"Sanctuary" "Sanktuarium"	Olga Chajdas	Joshua Long	November 30, 2018
6	"Subversion" "Zdrada"	Olga Chajdas	Joshua Long	November 30, 2018
7	"Mayday"	Agnieszka Smoczyńska	Joshua Long	November 30, 2018
8	"Requiem"	Katarzyna Adamik	Joshua Long	November 30, 2018

== Production ==
On 6 March 2018, Netflix announced that the series was in production, consisting of 8 episodes. On 2 October 2018, the first teaser trailer was released, with the series set to premiere globally on 30 November.

A second season was considered but the series was ultimately cancelled after one season.
