= Maciej Musiał =

Polish actor and television personality

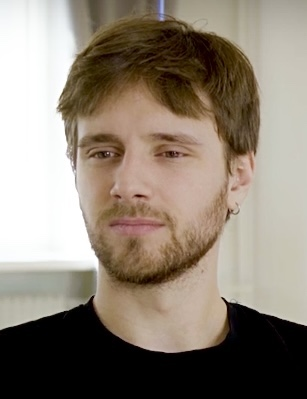
- Musiał in 2024
- Born: 11 February 1995 (age 31); Warsaw, Poland
- Education: AST National Academy of Theatre Arts in Kraków (2021)
- Occupations: Actor; television personality
- Years active: 2004–present

Maciej Musiał (Polish: [ˈma.t͡ɕɛj ˈmu.ɕaw]; born 11 February 1995) is a Polish actor and television personality.

== Biography ==
The son of actors Andrzej and Anna Musiał, he began his acting career at an early age with a cameo appearance in a 2004 episode of the long-running Polish soap opera Plebania. He was later cast as a series regular in Ojciec Mateusz (2008–2011), but his big break came with the role in Rodzinka.pl (2011–2020), which established him as a teen idol in Poland. As his popularity continued to grow, he began co-presenting The Voice of Poland, and had a lead role in the feature film My Own Pole, both in 2013. From 2014 to 2015, he studied Philosophy at the University of Warsaw. His work in television earned him the Telekamery award in 2016. He was the ambassador of the World Youth Day 2016 organized in Kraków.

Musiał gained wider recognition outside his native country for starring in the 2018 Netflix series 1983, which he also executive produced. In 2019, he was included for his work on Forbes' 30 Under 30 Europe list in the Entertainment category. He had a recurring role in the 2019 Netflix fantasy drama series The Witcher, and in the 2021 Canal+ Premium series Klangor. He graduated with master's degree in Acting from the AST National Academy of Theatre Arts in Kraków in 2021.

Musiał starred in the 2022 Netflix series 1899.

== Filmography ==
=== Films ===
Year	Title	Role	Notes	Ref.
2005	Oskar	Stefan "Szaszłyk"	Television play	
2007	Futro	Konrad Makowiecki		
2011	Man, Chicks Are Just Different	Boy in a bus		
2012	Offline	Kacper Tarski	Short film	
2013	My Pole	Young Jan Mela		
2013	Last House On The Road	Piotr		
2013	Matka brata mojego syna	Xawery Laskus	Television play	
2014	Dzień dobry, kocham cię!	Iwo		
2017	Two Crowns	Young Franciscan monk		
2018	Love is Everything	Daniel Wojnar		
2018	Fryderyk	Boy in Paris	Television play	
2020	Igraszki z diabłem	Lucjusz	Television play	
2021	Second Half	Jarosław Kot		
2022	Winter Dream	TV studio hoast		
2022	Fuks 2	Maciek		
2022	Tonight You're Sleeping With Me	Janek		
2023	The Peasants	Jaś		
2026	Parallel Tales	—N/a	Executive producer	
2026	Possible Love	—N/a	Executive producer	

=== Television series ===
Year	Title	Role	Notes	Ref.
2004	Plebania	Boy in the church	Episode no. 436	
2007	Prawo miasta	Maciek Gralczyk	2 episodes	
2008	Giraffe and Rhino Hotel	Janek Miłobędzki	Main role; 13 episodes	
2008–2011, 2019–2020	Father Matthew	Michał Wielicki	44 episodes	
2010	Rookie	Adam Szyma	Episode: "Partnerzy" (no. 2)	
2010	Ludzie Chudego	Boy with a crash on Inka	Episode no. 4	
2011	The Ranch	Boy in a music club	Episode: "Nad Solejuków i Wargaczów domem" (no. 64)	
2011–2020	Family.pl	Tomek Boski	Main role; 266 episodes	
2012	True Law	Sebastian Wróblewski	Episode no. 16	
2012	Ja to mam szczęście!	Igor	Episode no. 18	
2012–2013	Hotel 52	Łukasz Danisz	20 episodes	
2012–2015	Krew z krwi	Franek Majewski	18 episodes	
2013	Boscy w sieci	Tomek Boski	Main role	
2013–2020	The Voice of Poland	Himself	Reality show	
2014	Days of Honor	Apacz	12 episodes	
2016	Kocham cię, Polsko!	Himself	Game show; 12 episodes	
2018	1983	Kajetan Skowron	Main role; 8 episodes; also show creator and producer	
2019	DNA	Tadek Hołowni	2 episodes	
2019	The Trap	Artur	3 episodes	
2019	The Witcher	Sir Lazlo	2 episodes	
2021	Klangor	Ariel Galej	4 episodes	
2022	1899	Olek	8 episodes	

=== Stage ===
Year	Title	Role	Theatre
2015–2016	Damage	Martyn Fleming	Warsaw Syrena Theatre
2019–present	Dead Poets Society	Neil Perry	Warsaw Och-Theatre
