= The Voice of Poland =

Polish television program (talent show)

- Genre: Talent show
- Created by: John de Mol; Roel van Velzen
- Directed by: Rinke Rooyens
- Presented by: Hubert Urbański; Magdalena Mielcarz; Mateusz Szymkowiak; Marika; Tomasz Kammel; Maciej Musiał; Halina Mlynkova; Barbara Kurdej-Szatan; Marcelina Zawadzka; Małgorzata Tomaszewska; Aleksander Sikora; Paulina Chylewska; Jan Dąbrowski; Hi Hania; Sylwia Dąbrowska
- Judges: Kayah; Nergal; Anna Dąbrowska; Andrzej Piaseczny; Patrycja Markowska; Tomson & Baron; Marek Piekarczyk; Justyna Steczkowska; Edyta Górniak; Maria Sadowska; Natalia Kukulska; Michał Szpak; Piotr Cugowski; Grzegorz Hyży; Kamil Bednarek; Margaret; Urszula Dudziak; Sylwia Grzeszczak; Lanberry; Kuba Badach; Ania Karwan; Edyta Bartosiewicz
- Theme music composer: Martijn Schimmer
- Country of origin: Poland
- Original language: Polish
- No. of seasons: 17

Production
- Executive producers: Paulina Pomorska, Dobrosława Snarska-Pełka
- Producer: Michał Majak
- Cinematography: Dominika Machel
- Camera setup: Dominika Machel
- Production companies: Talpa (2011–2019); ITV Studios (2020–present); Rochstar

Original release
- Network: TVP 2
- Release: September 3, 2011 – present

Related
- The Voice Kids; The Voice Senior; The Voice (franchise)

The Voice of Poland is a Polish reality talent show that premiered on September 3, 2011, on the TVP 2 television network. The Voice of Poland is part of the international syndication The Voice based on the reality singing competition launched in the Netherlands as The Voice of Holland, created by Dutch television producer John de Mol.

== Selection process and format ==
The Blind Auditions

The blind auditions feature approximately 100 contestants who were selected during non-televised production pre-castings. At the beginning of the performance, the coaches have their backs turned to the participants, and if one of the coaches wants to take on a participant, they press their buttons and turn around to the singer who is automatically placed on his team. If more than one coach is turned around, the singer chooses the coach they want to work with. In the first four seasons and from the tenth, blind auditions end with the selection of 12 contestants. The size of the teams, however, varied over the seasons (13 in seasons 5 and 9; 14 in seasons 6 to 8; and 15 in season 14).

From the eleventh season during blind auditions, each coach can "block" another. The coach against whom the block was used loses the chance to invite that participant to their team. Each coach can use this feature only twice. If a coach uses a "block" against another coach and they do not turn around - the "block" is considered unused; this means that the block can be used as long as the coach who uses it actually "blocks" someone. "Block" buttons can be used both during and after a contestant's performance. In the fourteenth season, coaches will be able to use their block button only after a contestant's performance, unlike in the previous seasons.

The Battles round

This is followed by battles in which the coaches choose two people from their team (when the number of participants in a team is uneven, one of the battles is played by a trio, not a duo) who sing the same song together. The coach decides who moves on to the next stage and who drops out of the program. In the first season, coaches were assisted by invited specialists who were supposed to help them make the decision. From the second season onwards, the other coaches can make a "steal", i.e. take the loser to their team (by pressing their button). If more than one coach wants to steal a participant, that participant has the right to choose which team they want to go to.

In the seventh season, the "stealing" system has changed to what is known as the "hot chairs". Each coach can ultimately steal only one contestant (who sits on the hot seat assigned to that coach's team), because when "stealing" another contestant, the previously stolen person is replaced and dropped out of the competition; from the seventh to ninth seasons, each coach could steal (press the button and take over a contestant) up to three times, but from the tenth season, coaches can press the button to steal a contestant without any limitations. The battles therefore end with seven participants advancing to the next stage. During the ninth season, there was the first ever elimination of all participants from a team in one battle.

In season 14, battles have been divided into 2 parts: pre-battle and the main battle. During the pre-battle, the coaches pick three of their artists in a singing match and then select two of them to advance to the main battle to perform as a duo. During the main battle, the winning artists will battle once again, performing a different song. The coach select one of them to advance to the next round, while the other will be eliminated. At the end of this round, five artists will remain on each team. For the first time since the inaugural season, there are no steals during the battles round.

The Knockouts round

The battles are followed by the knockout round (in the first edition: overtime), in which the coaches eliminate more people who do not advance to the live episodes. During first six seasons, each of the coaches selected three people from his or her team (six people in the first season, seven people in the second season, eight people in seasons three to five, and nine people in the sixth season) who automatically qualified for the live shows. The coaches divided the others into threes (into two duos by the second season), and one person from each would move on to the next stage. Since the seventh season, all contestants have to sing - the first four from each team are automatically put in the hot seats, and after subsequent performances of the remaining three, the coach decides whether a given contestant stays in the show or not. Four (five in the first, second and sixth seasons) finalists from each team qualify for the live episodes. In the fourteenth season, five contestants will compete for the place in the live shows, but only four of them will advance to the next stage.

The Live Shows

When the teams consist of five, four, or three contestants, the coach chooses from among the two contestants with the fewest votes from the viewers (who decide by sending text messages) the person who drops out of the show. Each live episode ends with the elimination of one person from each group. In eleventh season due to the coronavirus pandemic episodes were previously recorded and the elimination rules were changed. Once all participants from a given team sang their songs, the coaches scored the performances, awarding them from one to ten points. The coach of that team would then select one participant to move on to the next stage (regardless of the score). The participant with the lowest number of points was eliminated from the remaining three or two (in case of a tie, the points from the coach of the evaluated team were decisive).

In the semi-finals (when the team is made up of two people), the coach divides 100 points between the contestants and then everyone is credited with as many points as the percentage of votes they get from the viewers. In the fifth season, while the semi-final took the form of what is known in the international format as "Cross Battles", which involved contestants dueling between teams. In the semi-final of the eleventh season the deciding factor was the total number of points awarded by all the coaches.

For season 16, selected singers (prior to the Live elimination rounds) are put through to the "Comeback Stage" (which would be mentored by a fifth coach) and competed in a series of duels for a place in the live shows.

The Final

Four participants (one from each team, with the exception of the fifth season), and the winner is chosen by viewers in an SMS vote. Voting is divided into three rounds; after each round, the person with the fewest number of votes drops out. In the first round the finalists sing a foreign language song followed by a duet with their coach; in the second round the repertoire consists of Polish songs; in the third round the remaining two contestants sing their own songs. In the fourteenth season all contestants who will advance to the live shows will sing along with the finalists.

In season 16, the number of finalists was increased from 4 to 5, one from each team (along with the finalist from the "Comeback Stage" feature introduced in the season).

== Coaches ==
=== Timeline ===
Color key
Featured as a full-time coach.
Featured as the Comeback Stage coach.
Featured as a contestant.

Timeline of coaches
Coach	Seasons																
Coach	1	2	3	4	5	6	7	8	9	10	11	12	13	14	15	16	17
Ania Dąbrowska																	
Nergal																	
Kayah																	
Andrzej Piaseczny																	
Tomson & Baron																	
Justyna Steczkowska																	
Marek Piekarczyk																	
Patrycja Markowska																	
Maria Sadowska																	
Edyta Górniak																	
Natalia Kukulska																	
Michał Szpak																	
Grzegorz Hyży																	
Piotr Cugowski																	
Kamil Bednarek																	
Margaret																	
Urszula Dudziak																	
Sylwia Grzeszczak																	
Lanberry																	
Kuba Badach																	
Ania Karwan																CS	
Edyta Bartosiewicz																	

=== Gallery ===
Current coaches

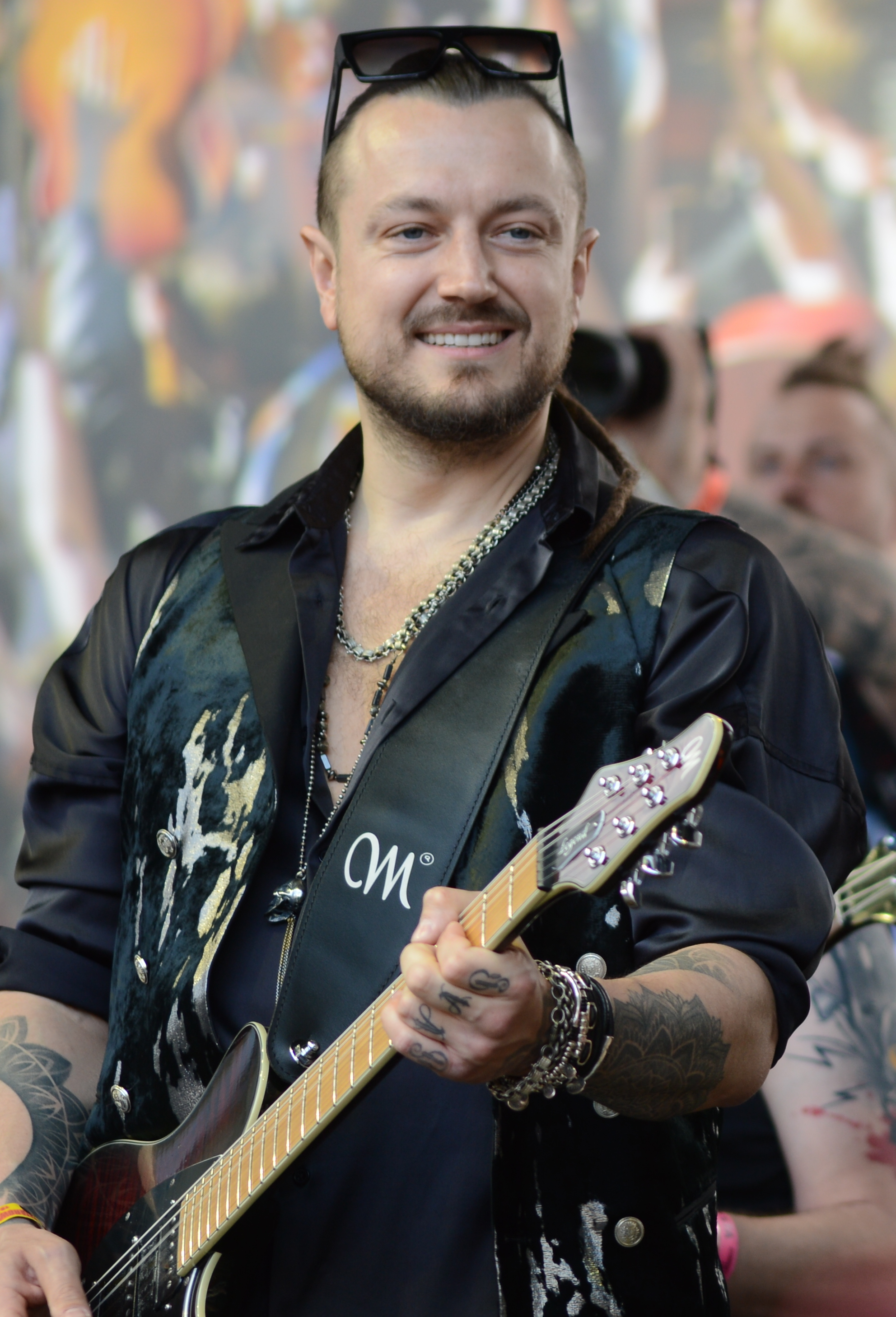
Baron (duo, 2–8, 10–)

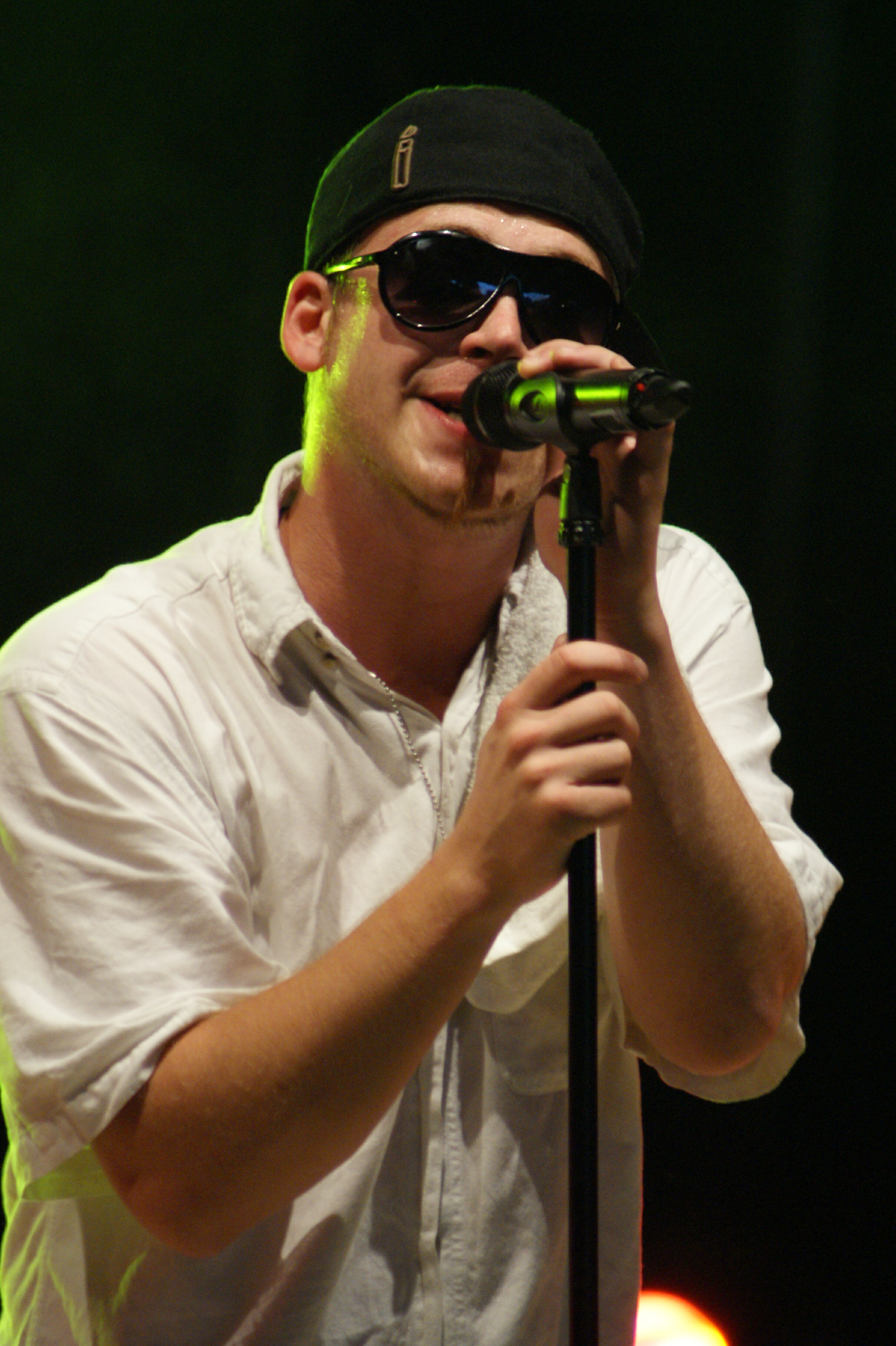
Tomson (duo, 2–8, 10–)

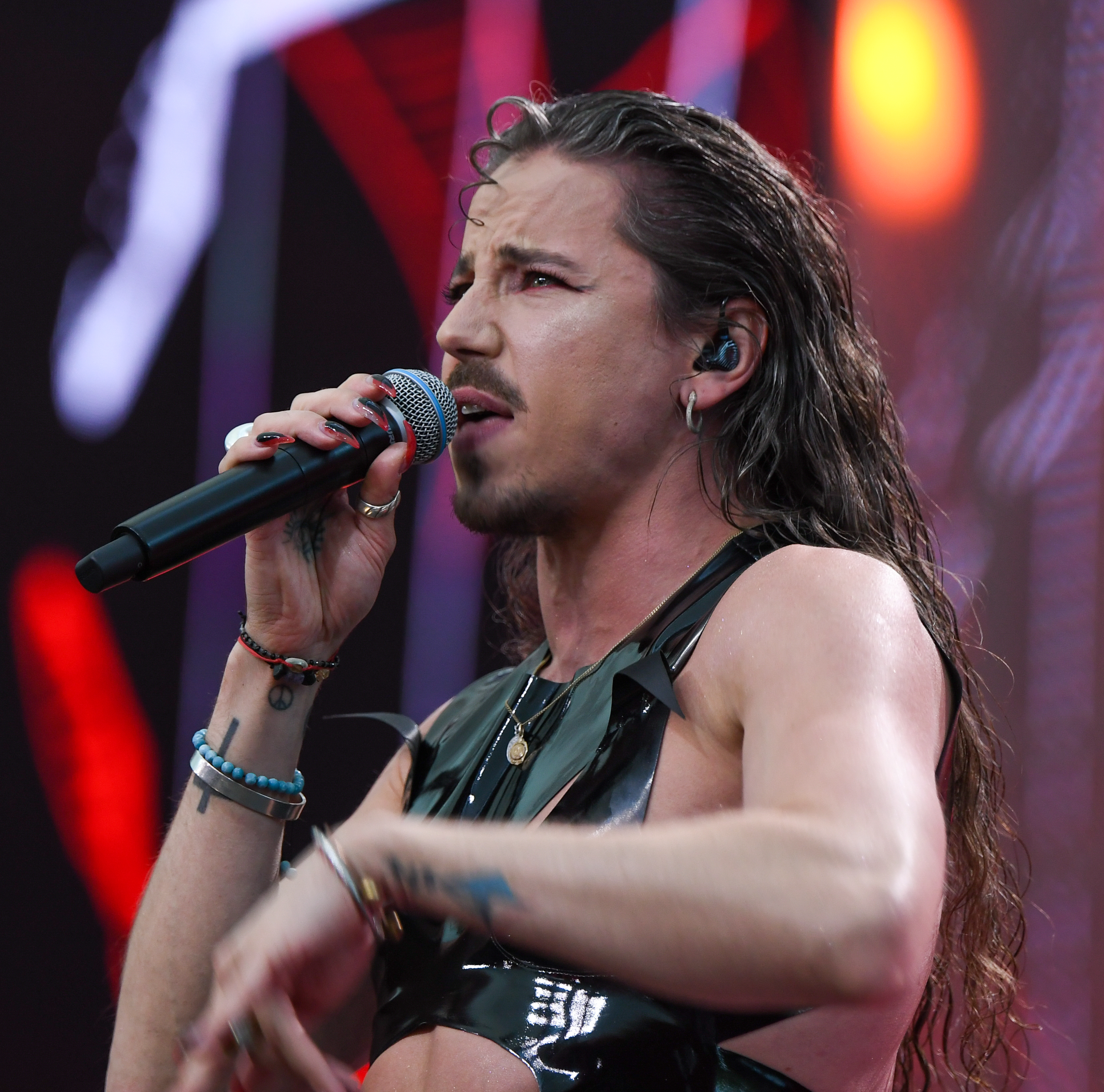
Michał Szpak (8–11, 15–)

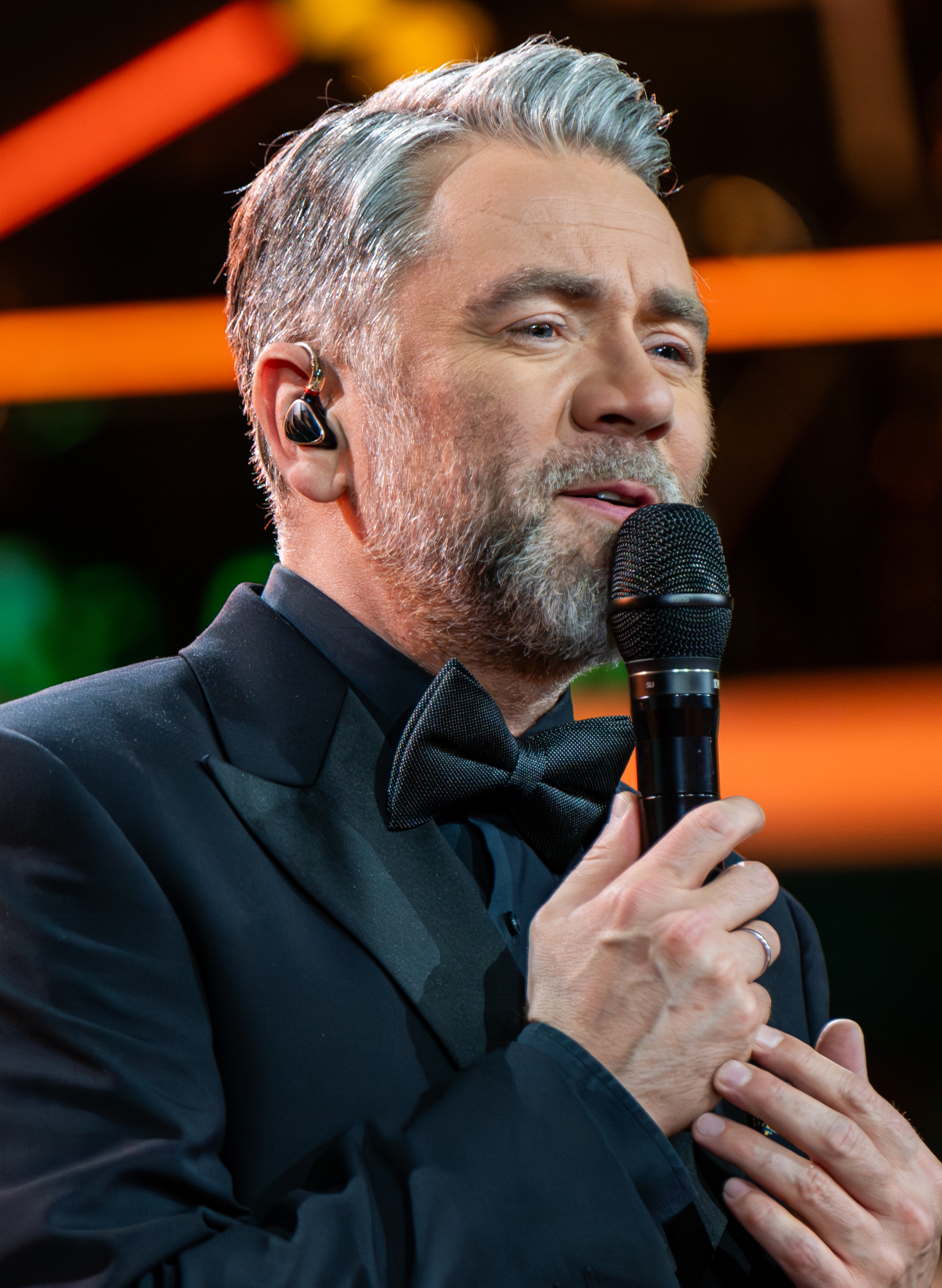
Kuba Badach (15–)

Edyta Bartosiewicz (17–)

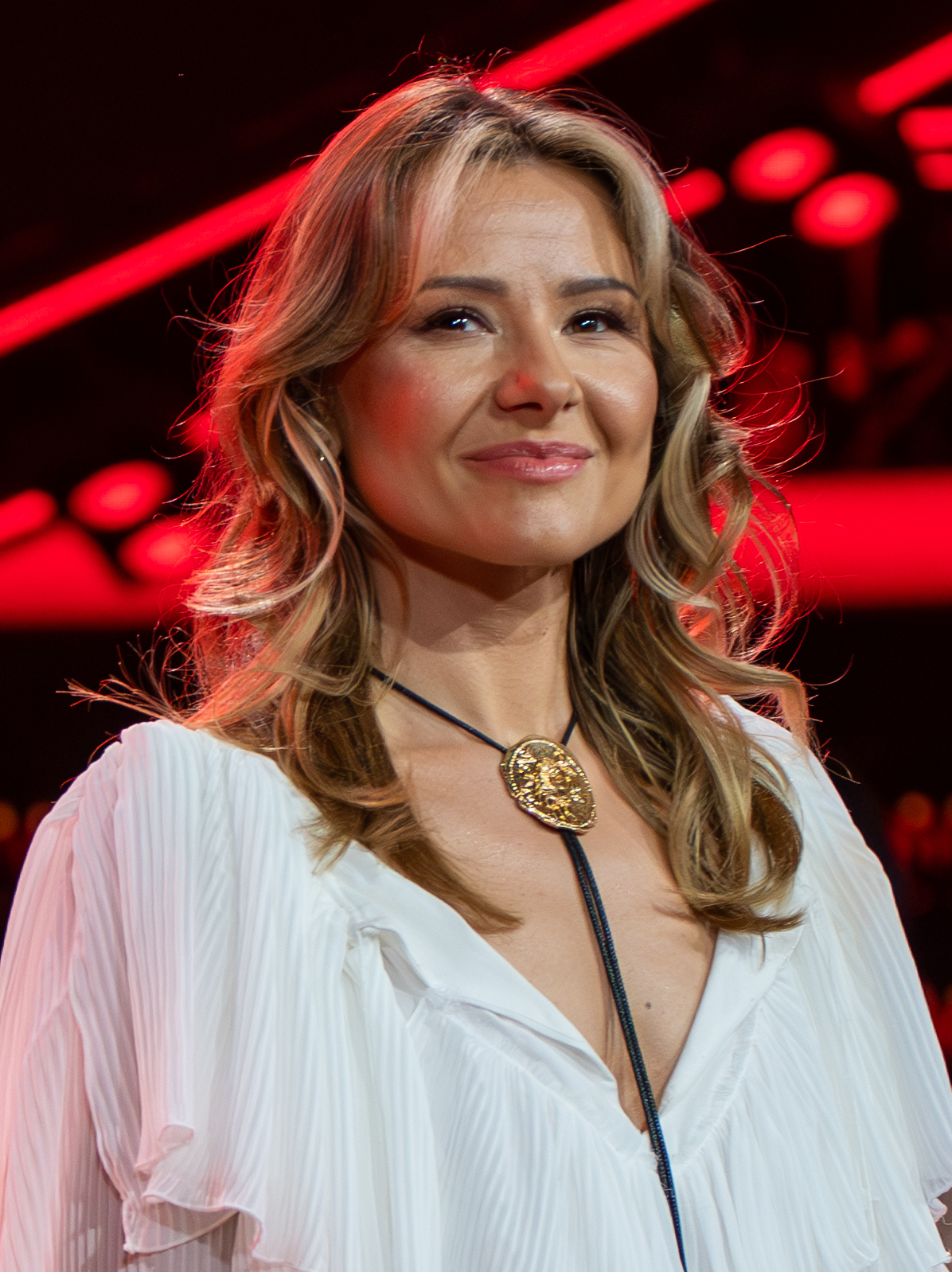
Ania Karwan (Comeback Stage, 16–)
Former coaches

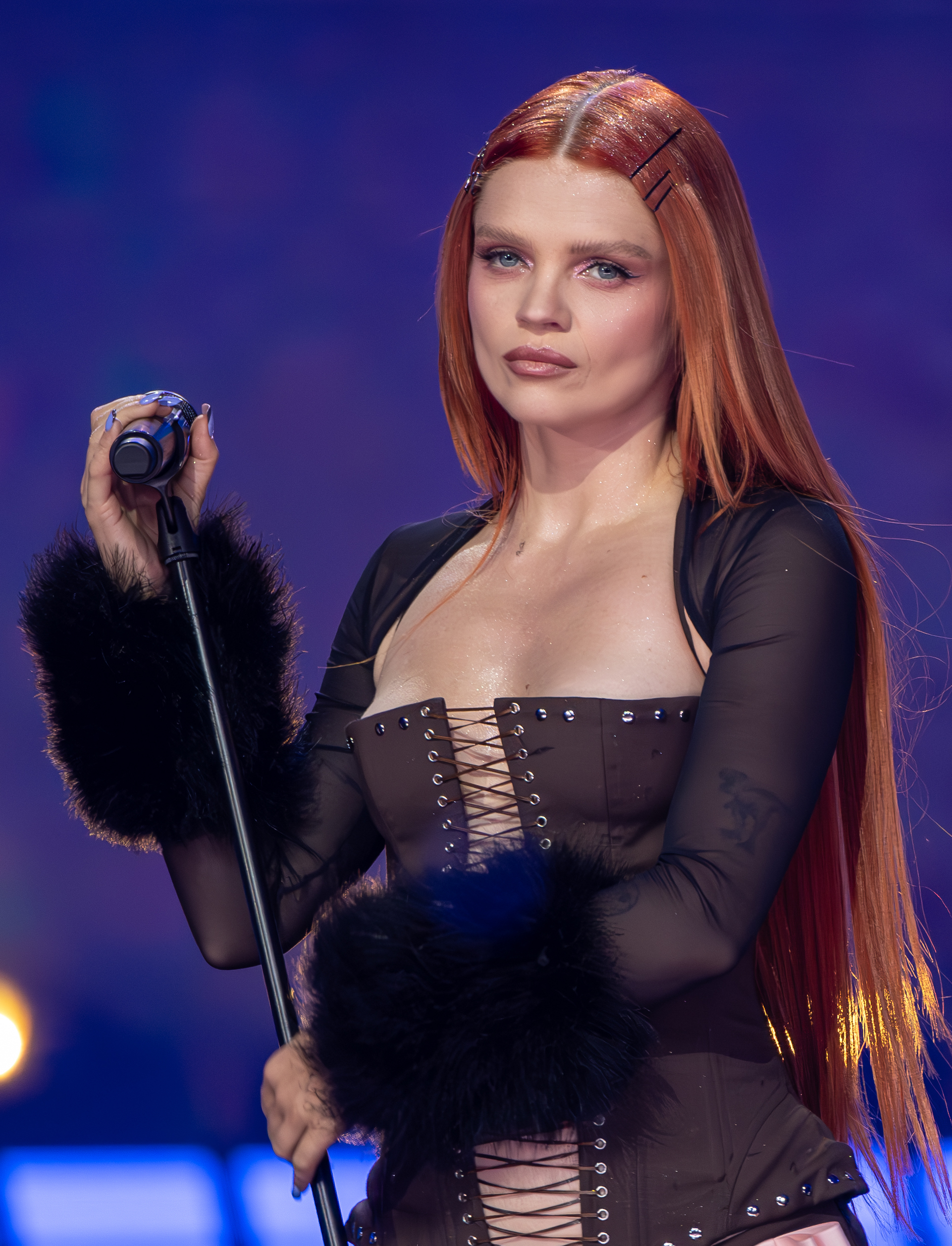
Margaret (10, 16)

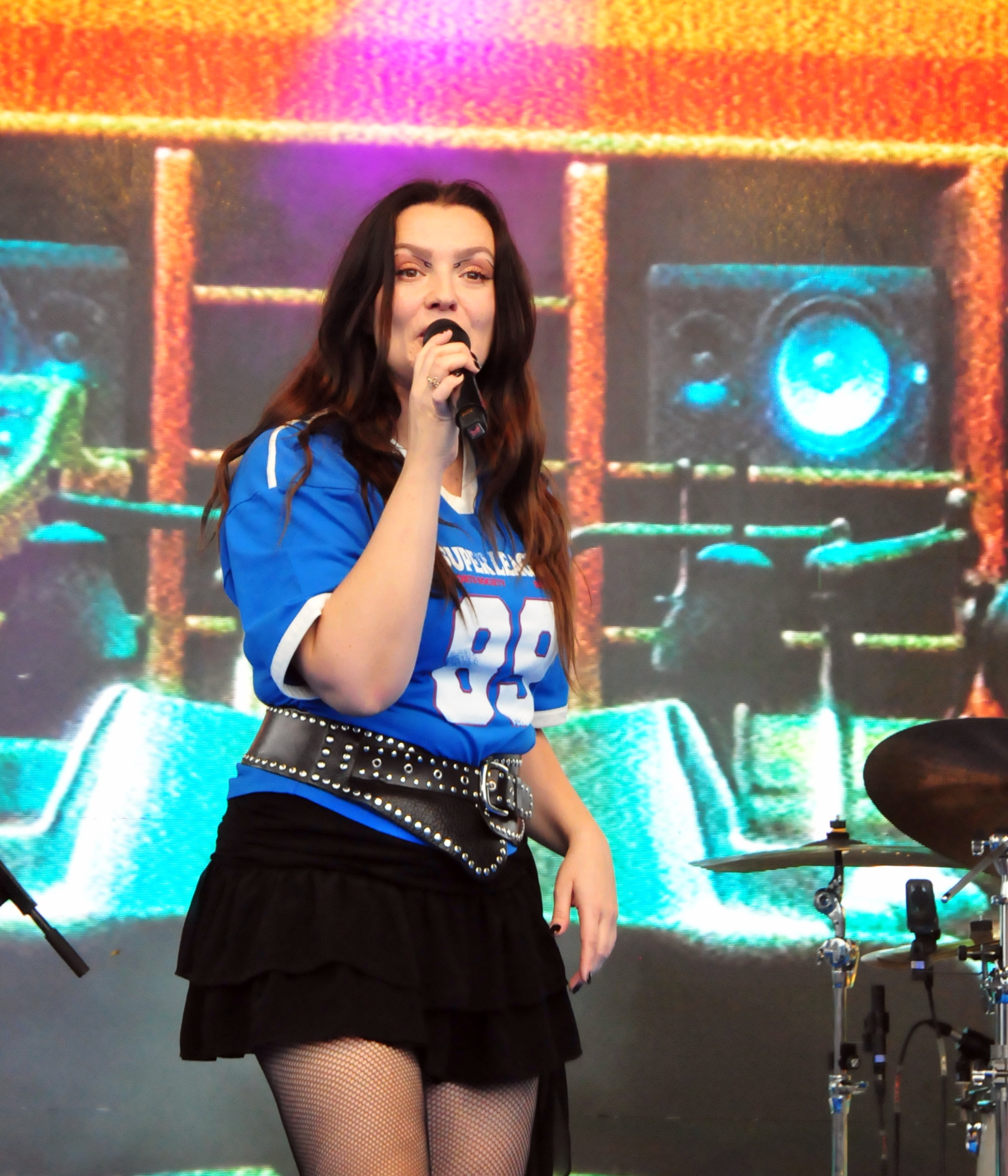
Lanberry (13–15)

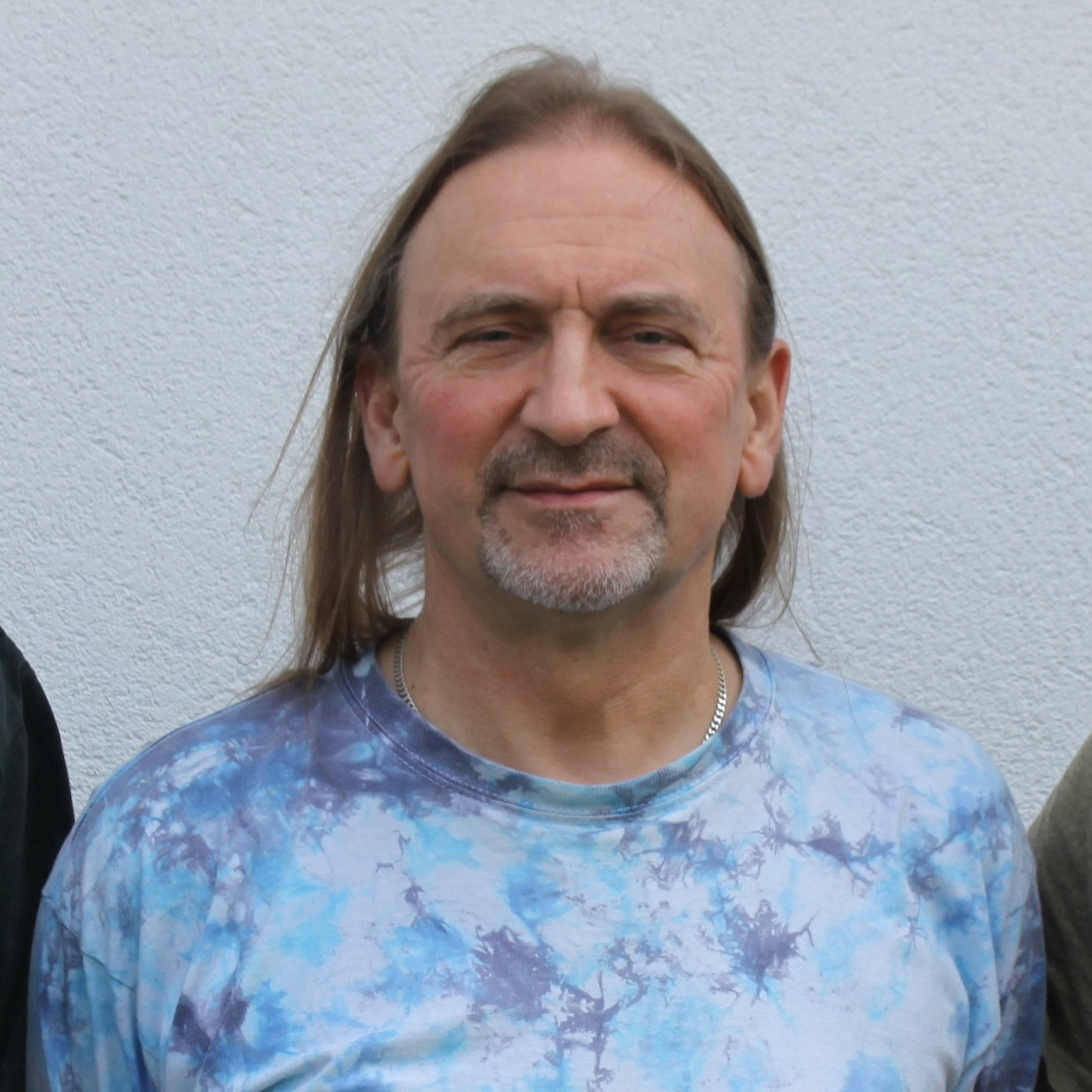
Marek Piekarczyk (2–5, 12–14)

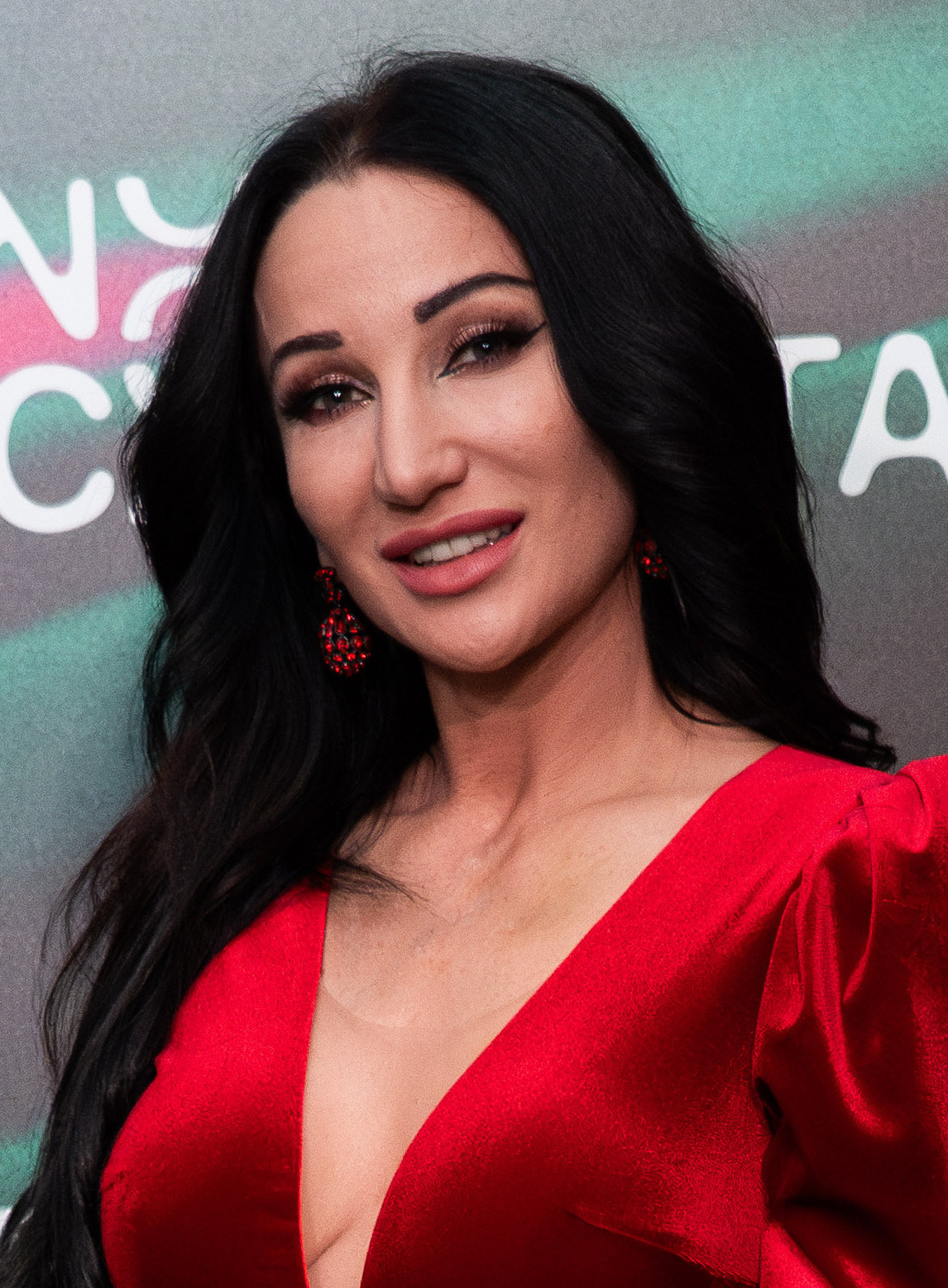
Justyna Steczkowska (2, 4–5, 12–14)

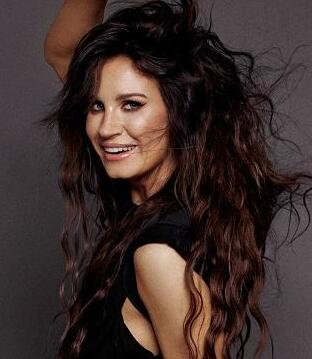
Sylwia Grzeszczak (12)

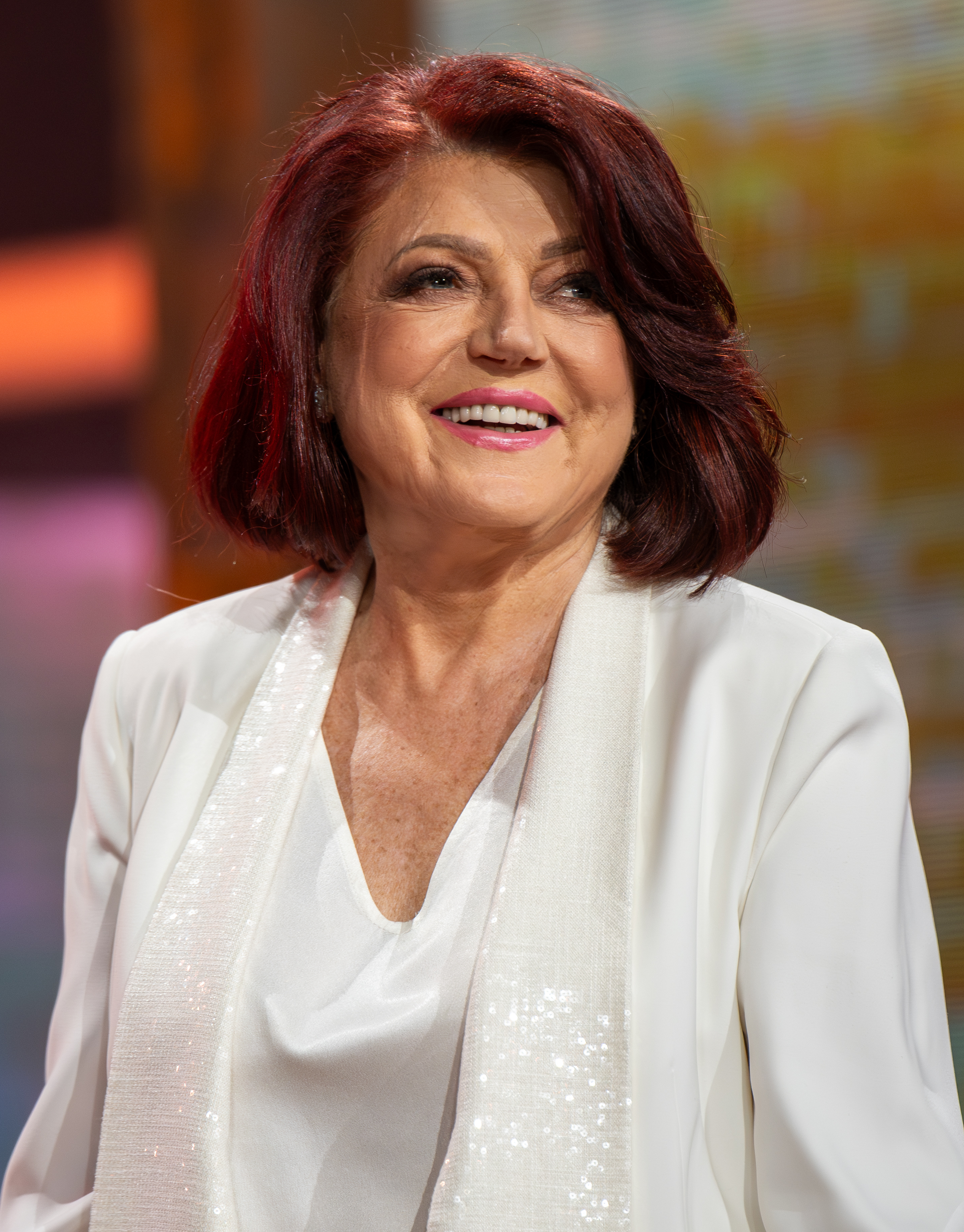
Urszula Dudziak (11)

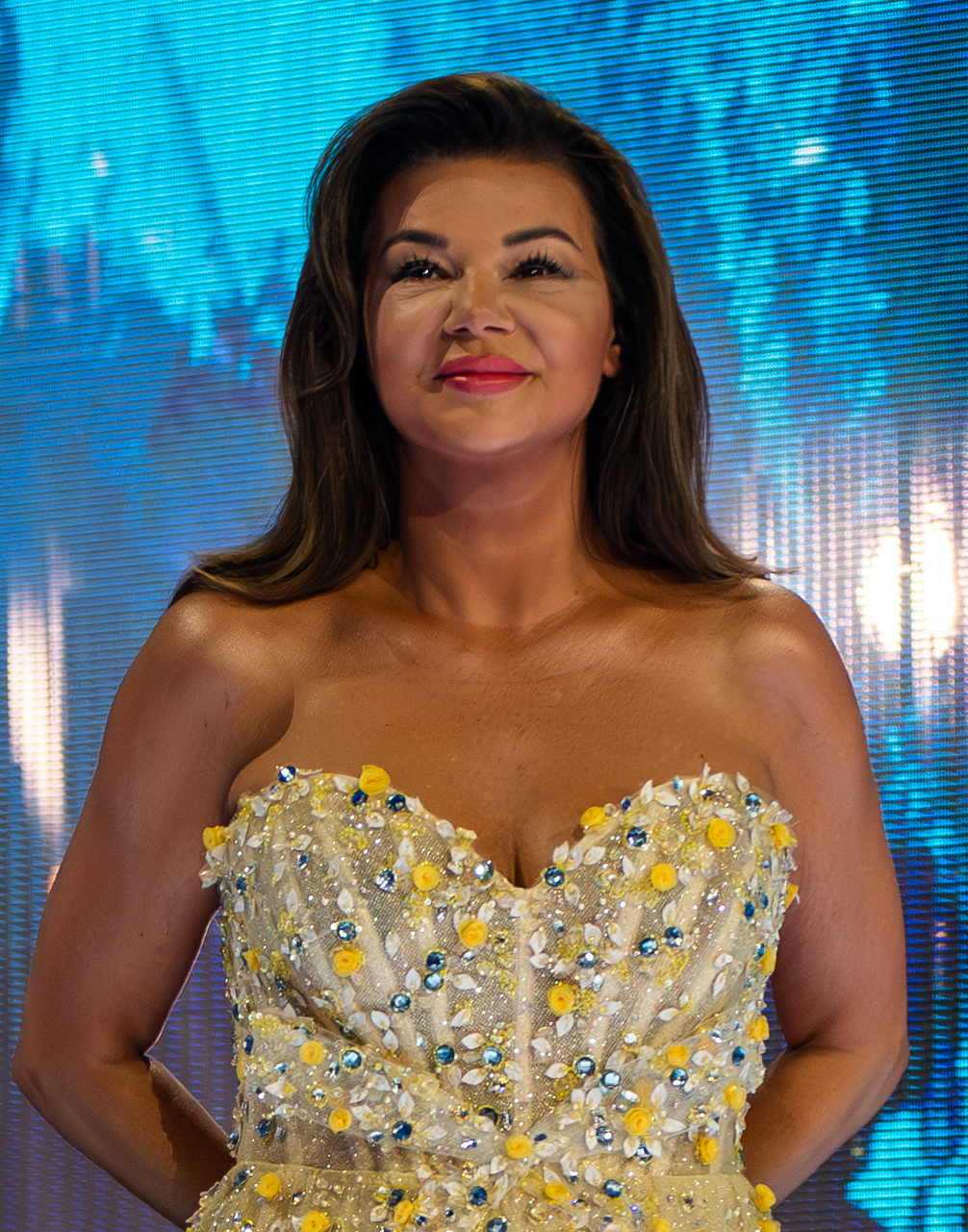
Edyta Górniak (3, 5–6, 11)

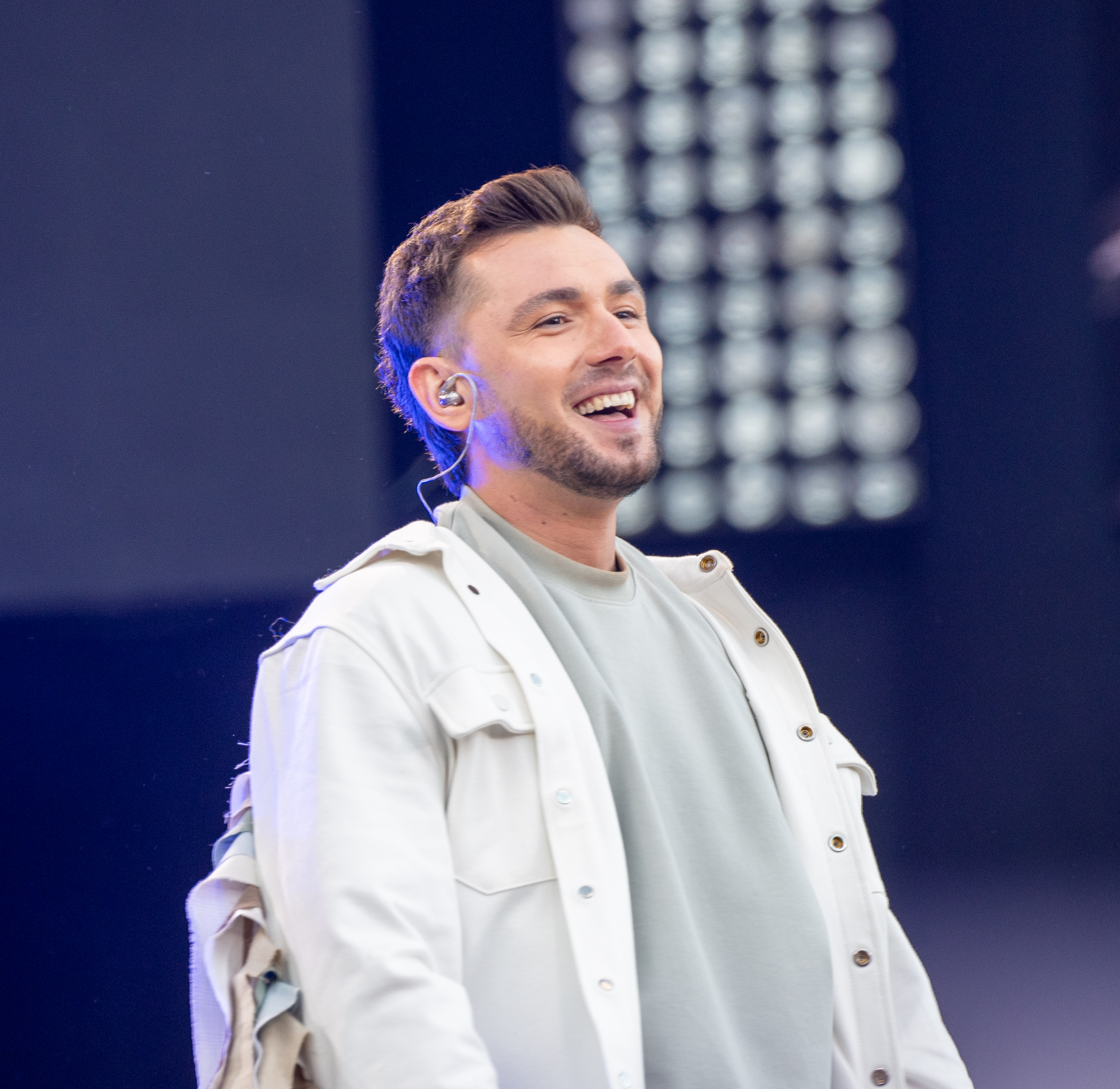
Kamil Bednarek (10)

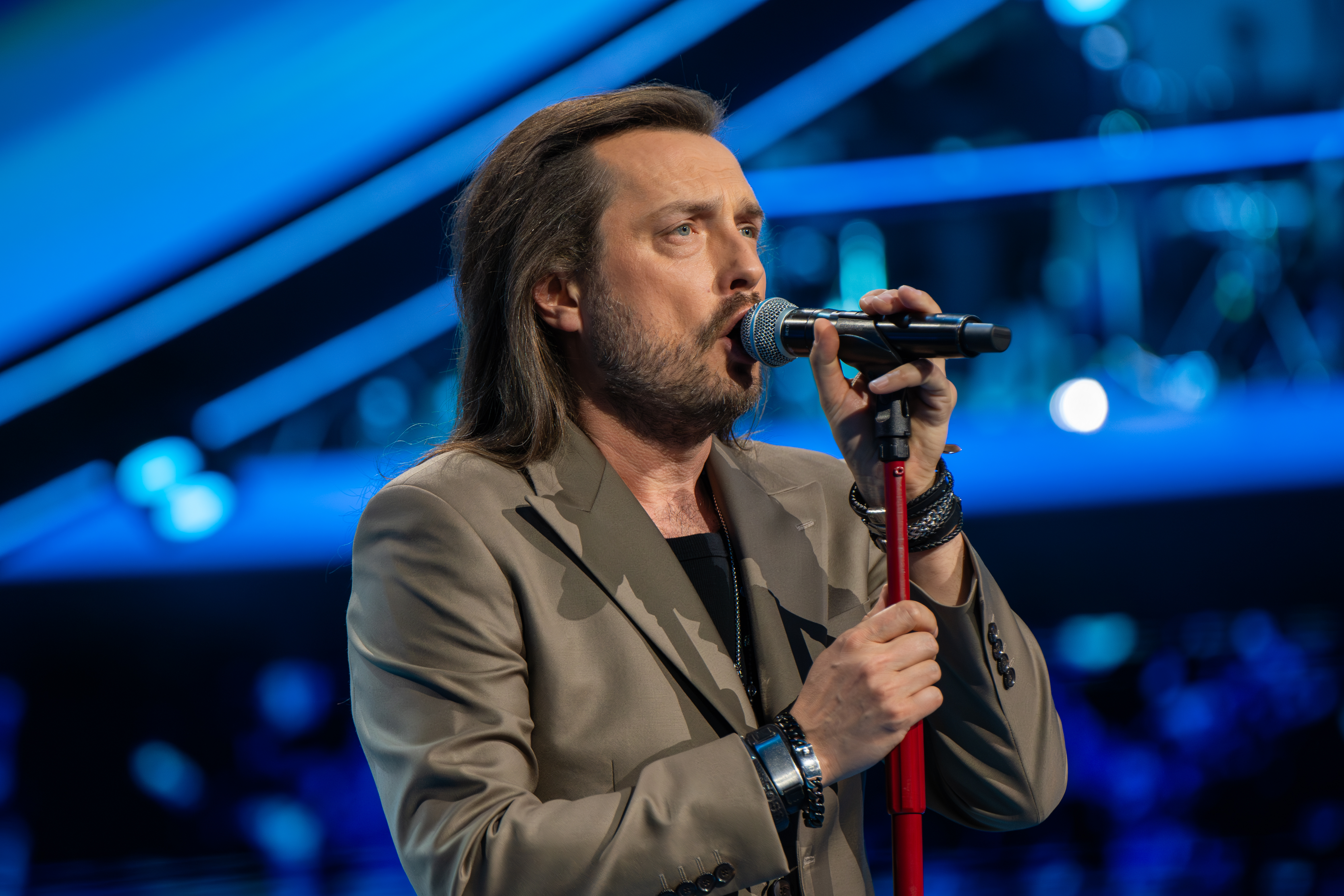
Piotr Cugowski (9)

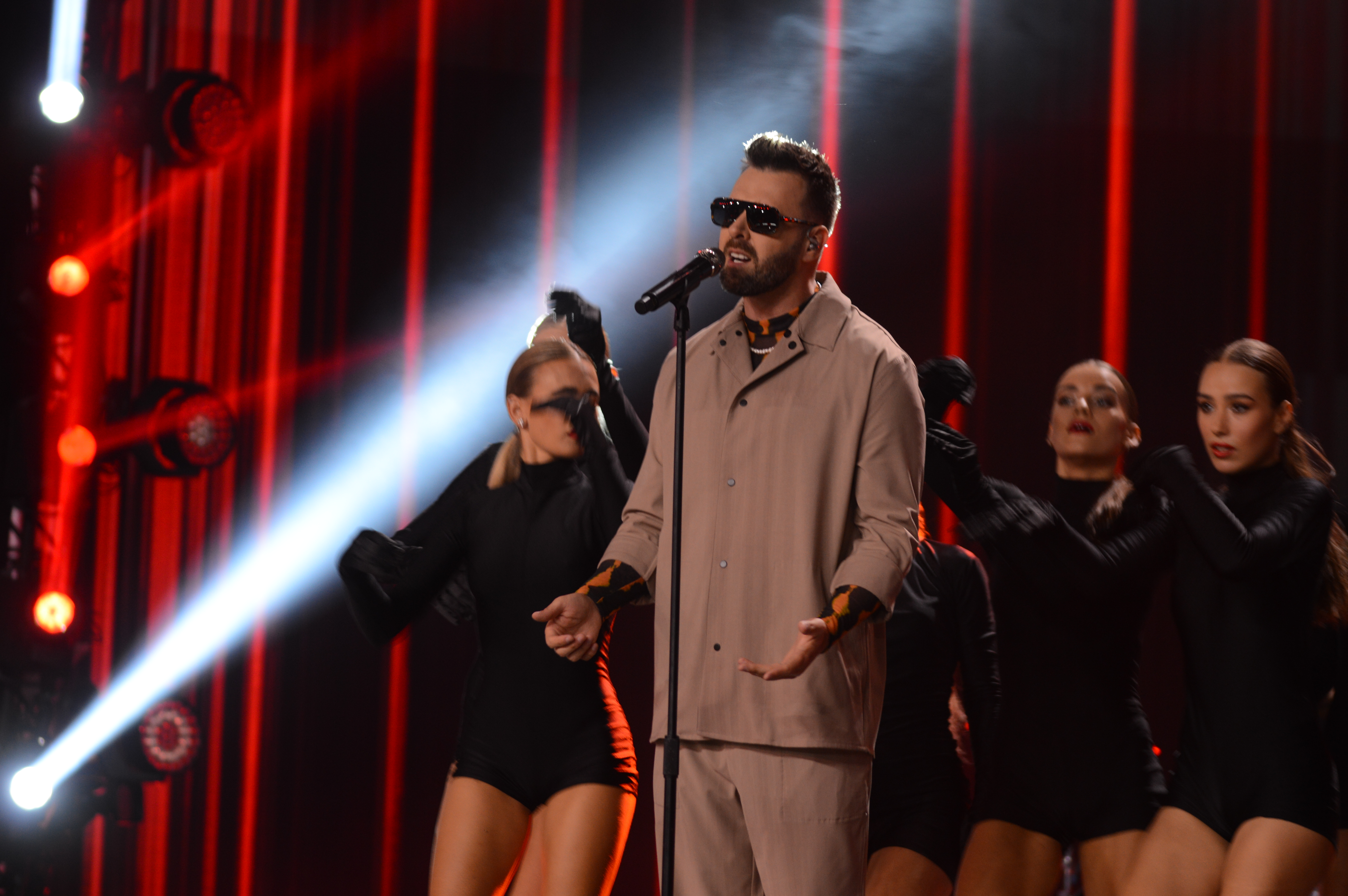
Grzegorz Hyży (9)

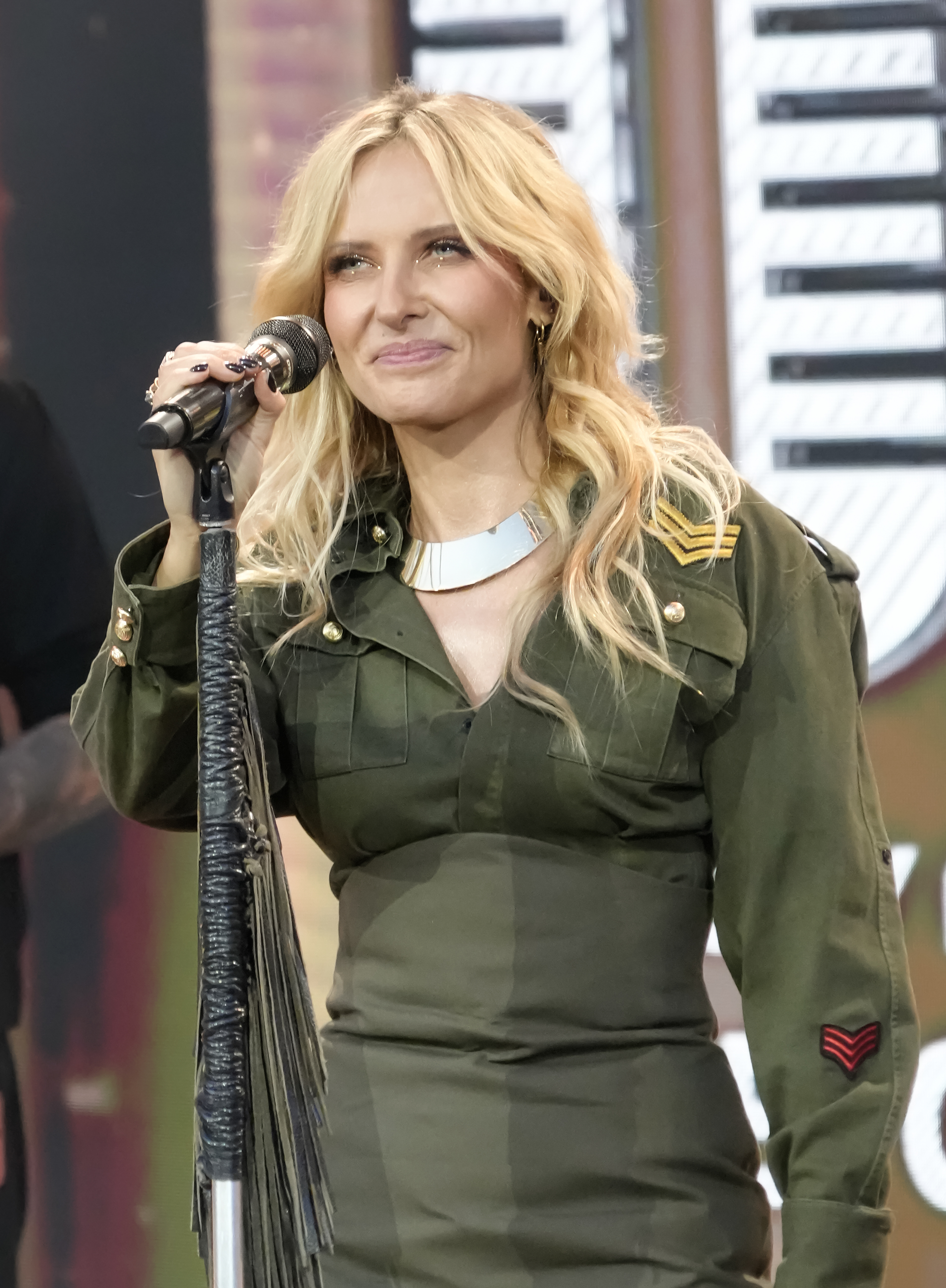
Patrycja Markowska (2, 9)

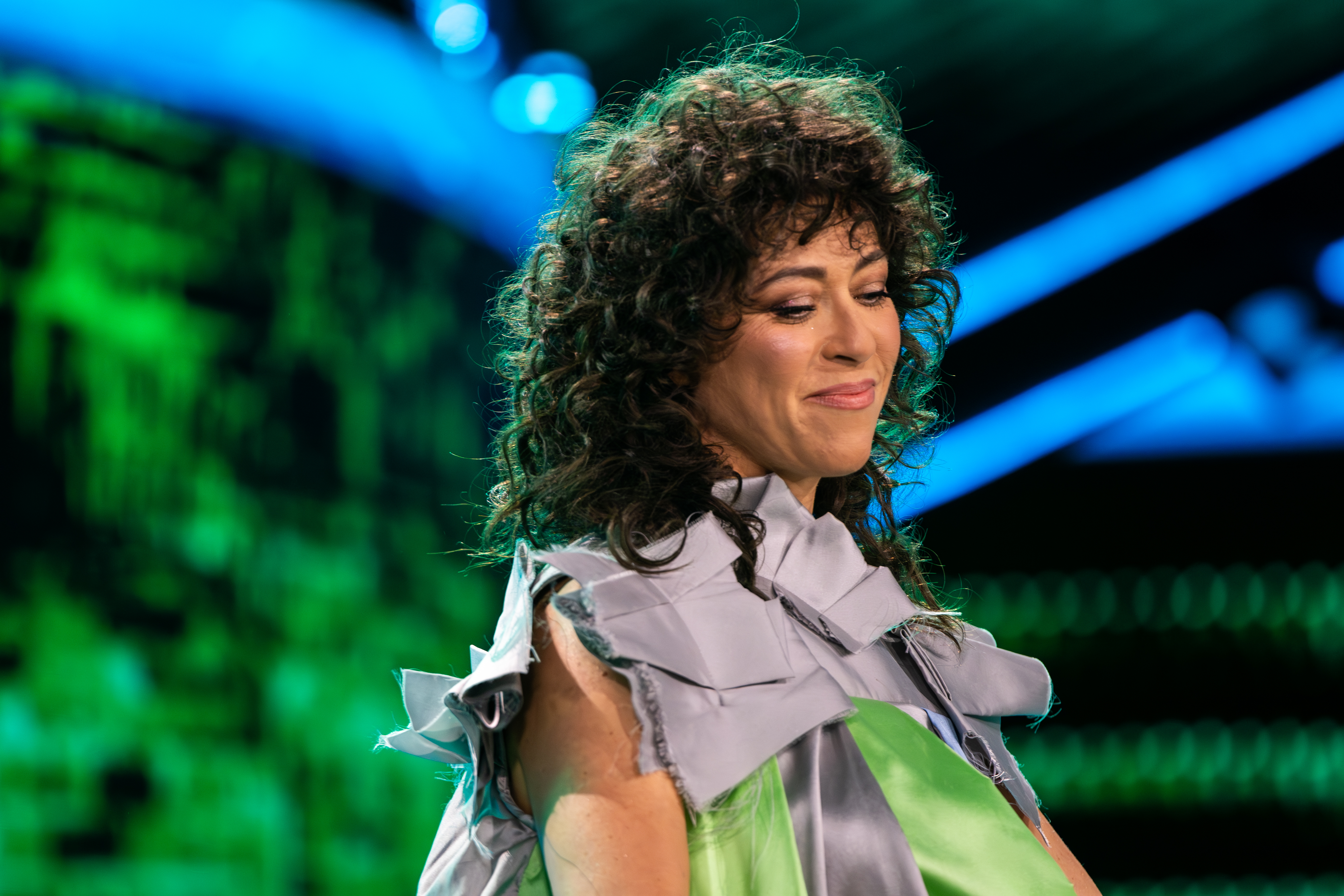
Natalia Kukulska (7)

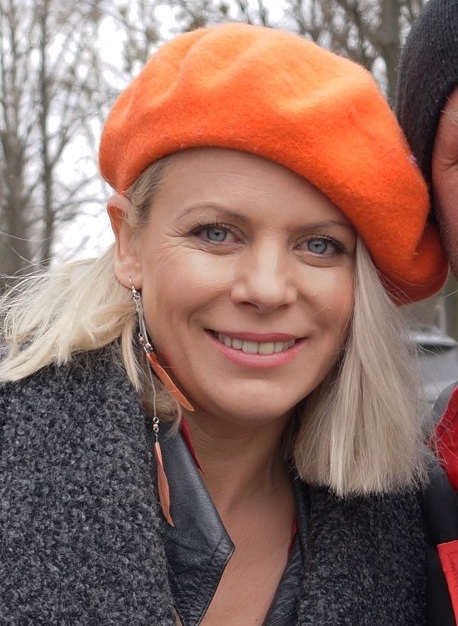
Maria Sadowska (3–4, 6–8)

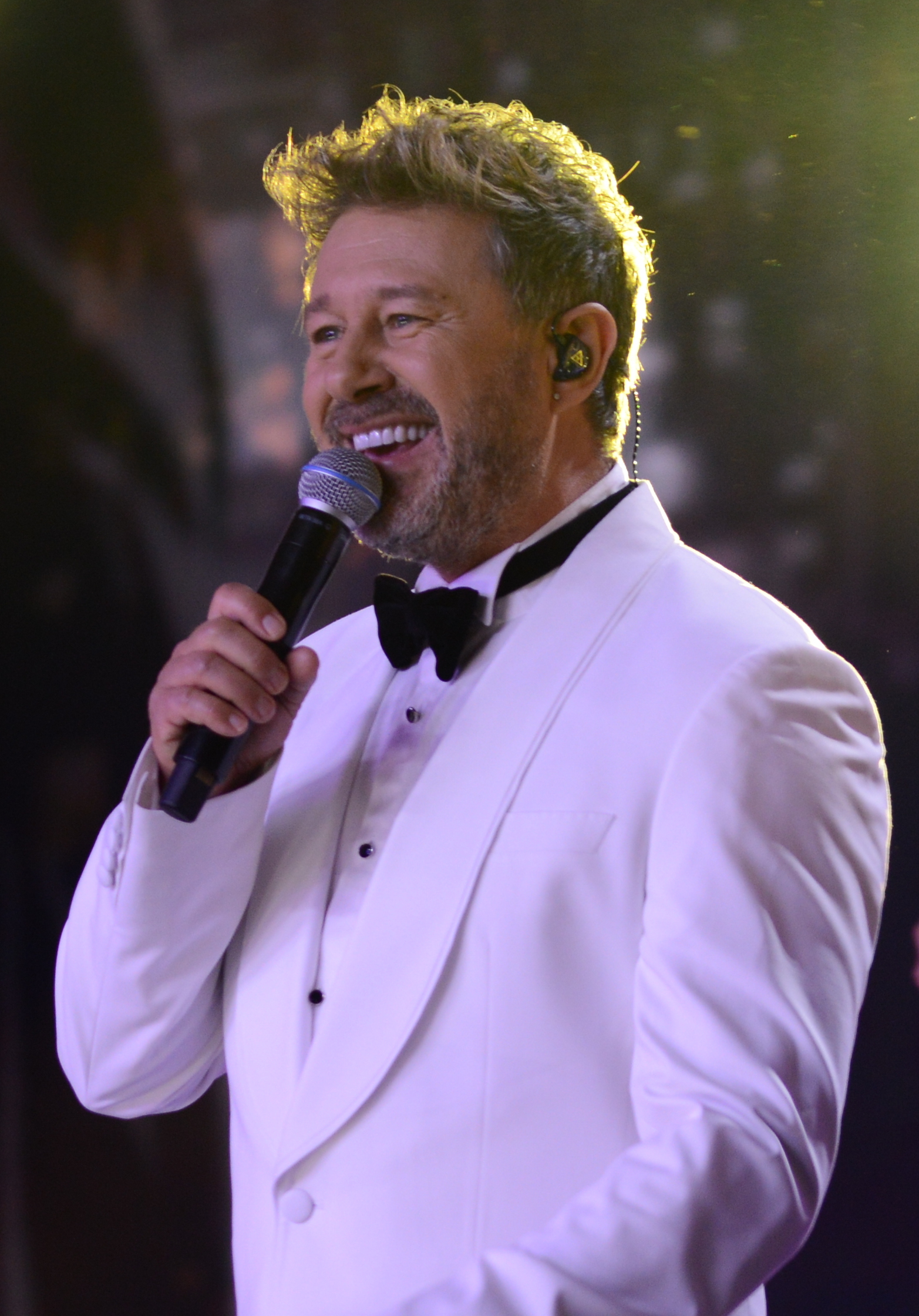
Andrzej Piaseczny (1, 6–8)

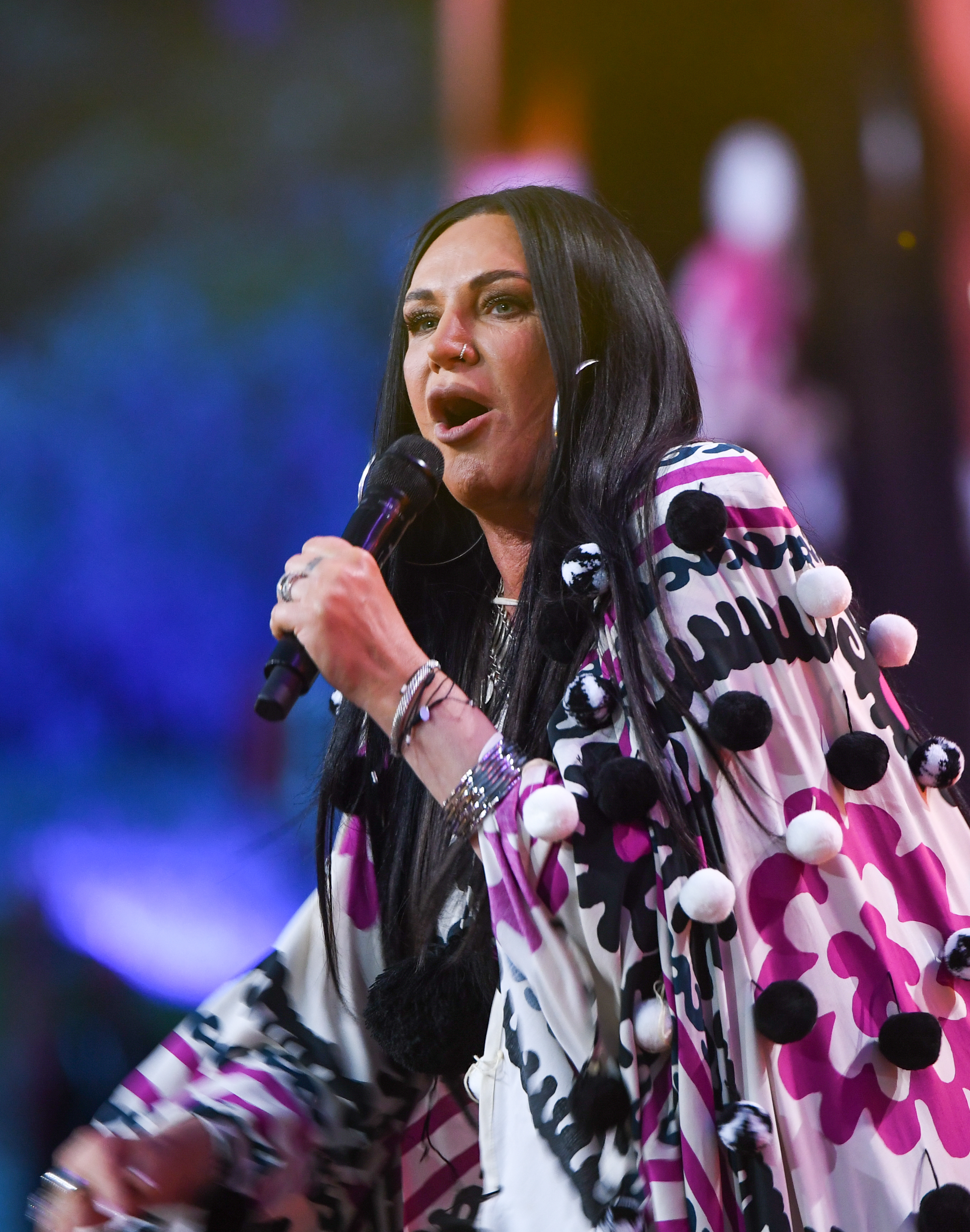
Kayah (1)

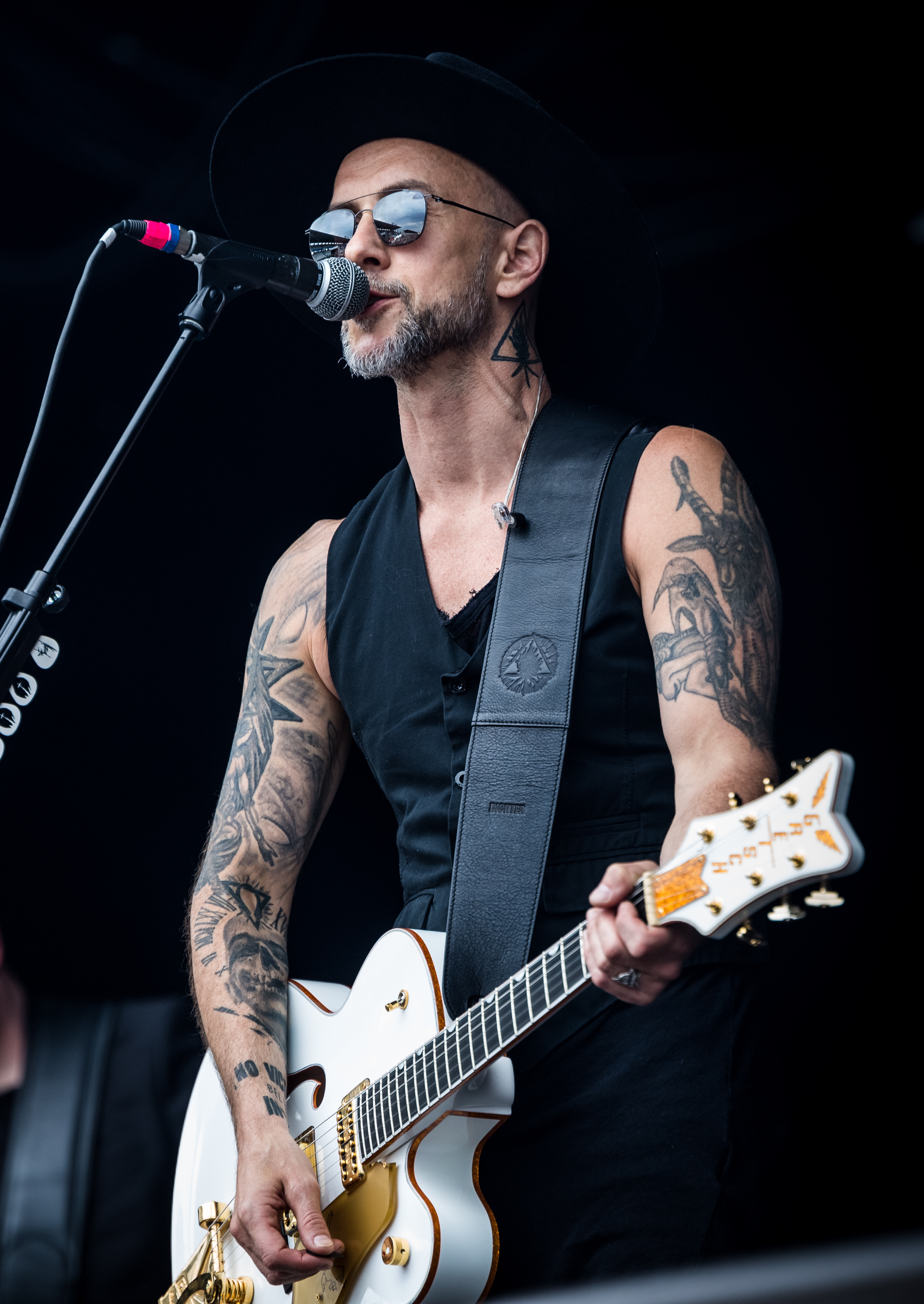
Nergal (1)

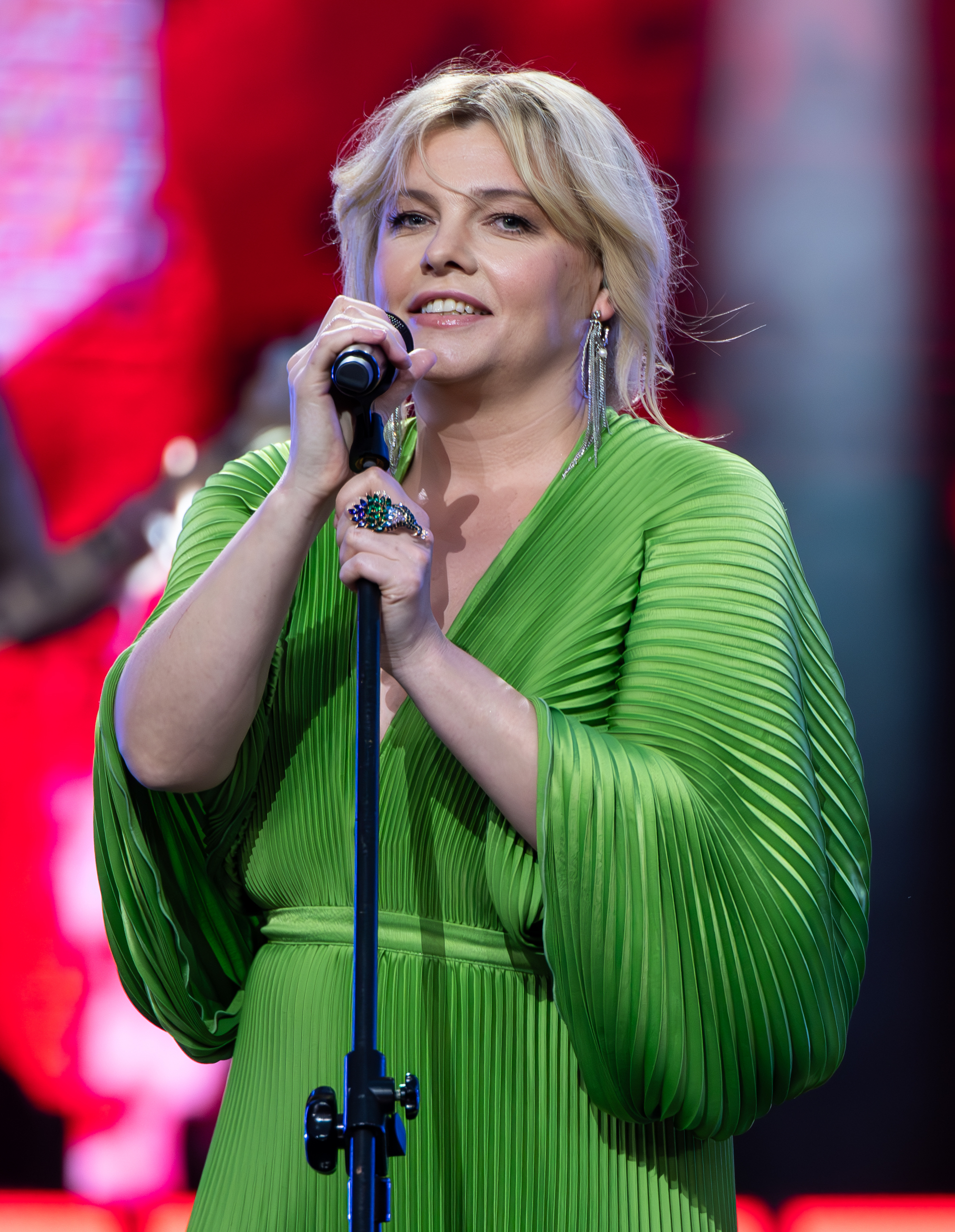
Anna Dąbrowska (1)

=== Line-up of coaches ===
Coaches' line-up by chairs order
Season	Year	Coaches			
Season	Year	1	2	3	4
1	2011	Andrzej	Kayah	Nergal	Ania
2	2013	Justyna	Tomson & Baron	Patrycja	Marek
3	2013	Edyta	Tomson & Baron	Maria	Marek
4	2014	Marek	Justyna	Tomson & Baron	Maria
5	2014	Tomson & Baron	Edyta	Justyna	Marek
6	2015	Tomson & Baron	Maria	Edyta	Andrzej
7	2016	Tomson & Baron	Natalia	Andrzej	Maria
8	2017	Andrzej	Maria	Michał	Tomson & Baron
9	2018	Grzegorz	Patrycja	Michał	Piotr
10	2019	Michał	Tomson & Baron	Margaret	Kamil
11	2020	Edyta	Michał	Ula	Tomson & Baron
12	2021	Sylwia	Tomson & Baron	Justyna	Marek
13	2022	Tomson & Baron	Justyna	Lanberry	Marek
14	2023	Tomson & Baron	Justyna	Lanberry	Marek
15	2024	Tomson & Baron	Lanberry	Kuba	Michał
16	2025	Tomson & Baron	Margaret	Kuba	Michał
17	2026	Kuba	Tomson & Baron	Edyta	Michał

== Hosts ==
=== Timeline ===
Color key
Featured as a main host.
Featured as a backstage host.
Featured as a contestant.

Timeline of main hosts
Host	Seasons																
Host	1	2	3	4	5	6	7	8	9	10	11	12	13	14	15	16	17
Hubert Urbański																	
Magdalena Mielcarz																	
Tomasz Kammel																	
Marika																	
Halina Mlynkova																	
Barbara Kurdej-Szatan																	
Maciej Musiał																	
Małgorzata Tomaszewska																	
Paulina Chylewska																	
Mateusz Szymkowiak																	
Iga Krefft																	
Marta Siurnik																	
ReZigiusz																	
Łukasz Jakóbiak																	
Marcelina Zawadzka																	
Krzysztof Jankowski																	
Adam Zdrójkowski																	
Wiktoria Gąsiewska																	
Ewa Zawada																	
Aleksander Sikora																	
Michał Szczygieł																	
Jan Dąbrowski																	
Hi Hania																	
Sylwia Dąbrowska																	

=== Gallery ===
Current main hosts

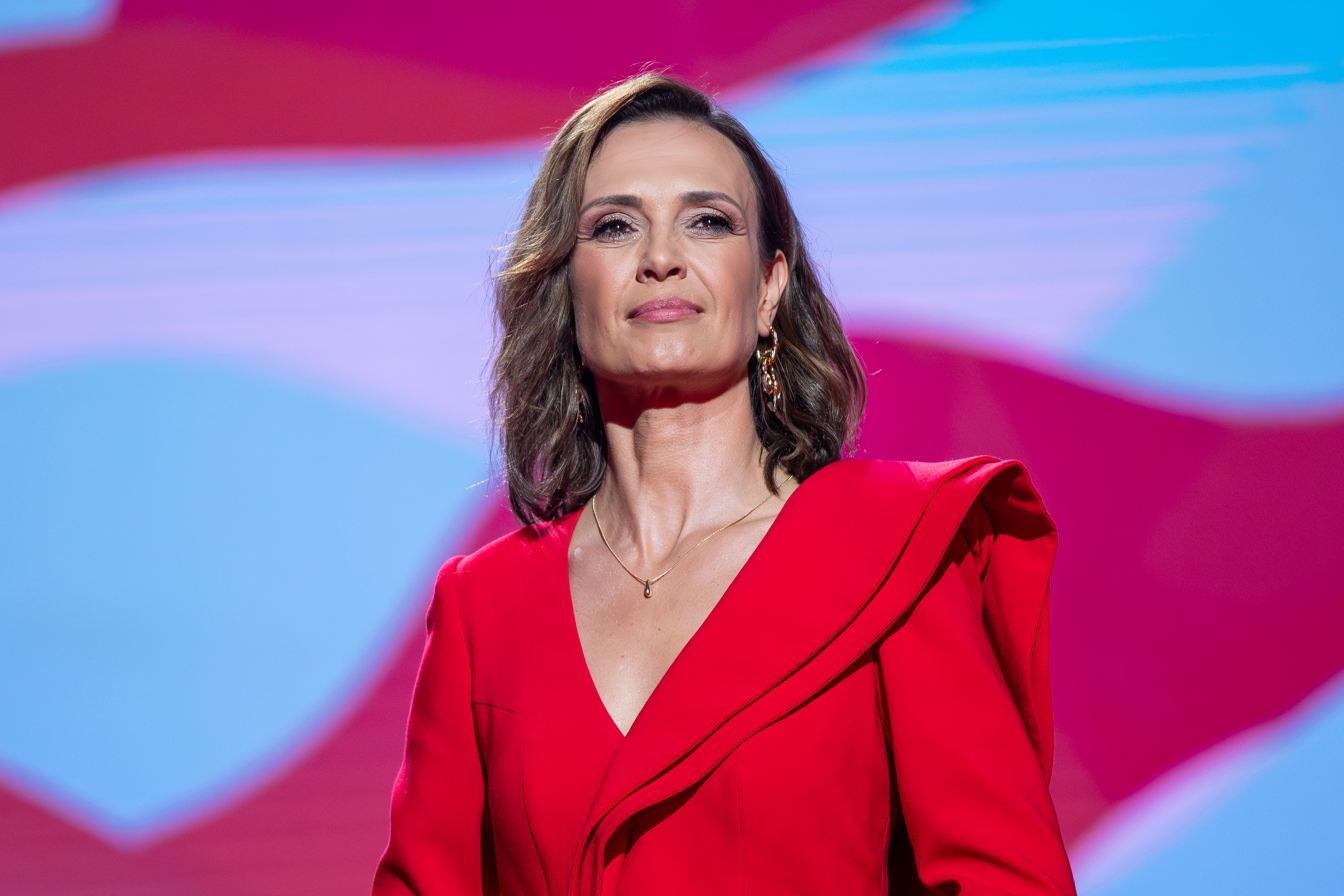
Paulina Chylewska (15–)

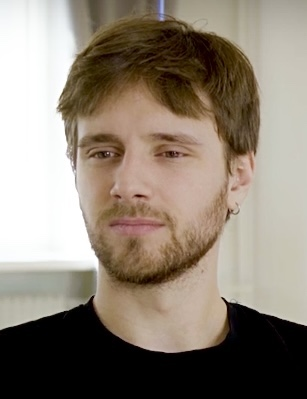
Maciej Musiał (2–11, 15–)

== Coaches and their finalists ==
Color key
Winner
Runner-up
Third place
Fourth place
Fifth place

Season	Coaches				
1	Team Andrzej	Team Kayah	Team Nergal	Team Ania D.	No fifth coach
1	Antoni Smykiewicz	Mateusz Krautwurst	Damian Ukeje	Piotr Niesłuchowski	No fifth coach
1	Rafał Brzozowski	Filip Moniuszko	Monika Urlik	Aleksandra Galewska	No fifth coach
1	Katarzyna Lisowska	Edyta Strzycka	Ewelina Kordy	Karolina Charko	No fifth coach
1	Ian Rooth (Michał Korzeniowski)	Kaja Domińska	Ares Chadzinikolau	Ewa Szlachcic	No fifth coach
1	Ewa Kłosowicz	Maciej Moszyński	Filip Sałapa	Katarzyna Klimczyk	No fifth coach
2	Team Justyna	Team Tomson & Baron	Team Patrycja	Team Marek	No fifth coach
2	Michał Sobierajski	Dorota Osińska	Natalia Nykiel	Natalia Sikora	No fifth coach
2	Monika Szczot	Kasia Dereń	Żaneta Lubera	Juliusz Kamil	No fifth coach
2	Beata Dobosz	Michał Jabłoński	Justyna Panfilewicz	Wojciech Gruszczyński	No fifth coach
2	Michalina Brudnowska	Mateusz Grędziński	Jan Traczyk	Magdalena Bałdych	No fifth coach
2	Bartłomiej Kawałek	Anna Ozner	Jurand Wójcik	Barbara Janyga	No fifth coach
3	Team Edyta	Team Tomson & Baron	Team Maria	Team Marek	No fifth coach
3	Jagoda Kret	Arkadiusz Kłusowski	Mateusz Ziółko	Ernest Staniaszek	No fifth coach
3	Olga Jankowska	Michał Grobelny	Katarzyna Stanek	Marzena Ugorna	No fifth coach
3	Maia Lasota	Natalia Krakowiak	Joanna Smajdor	Nella Marczewski	No fifth coach
3	Maria Rodriguez	Michał Malicki	Oksana Predko	Magdalena Meisel	No fifth coach
4	Team Marek	Team Justyna	Team Tomson & Baron	Team Maria	No fifth coach
4	Aleksandra Węglewicz	Katarzyna Sawczuk	Maja Gawłowska	Juan Carlos Cano	No fifth coach
4	Michał Karpacki	Artur Kryvych	Kamil Bijoś	Monika Pilarczyk	No fifth coach
4	Dominika Kobiałka	Michał Rudaś	Paulina Romaniuk	Marta Dryll	No fifth coach
4	Justyna Kunysz	Michał Szyc	Wojciech Baranowski	Sandra Mika	No fifth coach
5	Team Tomson & Baron (Note: No contestant from Tomson & Baron's team moved on to the finale.)	Team Edyta	Team Justyna (Note: Two contestants from Justyna's team won a place in the finale.)	Team Marek	No fifth coach
5	Natalia Lubrano	Przemysław Radziszewski	Aleksandra Nizio	Magdalena Paradziej	No fifth coach
5	Justyna Janik	Iga Kozacka	Gracjan Kalandyk	Żaneta Łabudzka	No fifth coach
5	Marta "Sarsa" Markiewicz	Jerzy Grzechnik	Agnieszka Twardowska	Tomasz Fridrych	No fifth coach
5	Natalia Podwin	Sandra Rusin	Karol Dziedzic	Łukasz Szemraj	No fifth coach
6	Team Tomson & Baron	Team Maria	Team Edyta	Team Andrzej	No fifth coach
6	Tobiasz Staniszewski	Krzysztof Iwaneczko	Ana Andrzejewska	William Prestigiacomo	No fifth coach
6	Julia Skiba & Jędrzej Skiba	Katarzyna Malenda	Julia Bogdańska	Maciej Grenda	No fifth coach
6	Anna Kłys	Patryk Skoczyński	Katarzyna Miśkowiec	Piotr Tłustochowicz	No fifth coach
6	Marta Moszczyńska	Asteya Dec	Marcin Czyżewski	Karolina Leszko	No fifth coach
6	Patryk Glinka	Sabina Nycek	Daniel Cebula-Orynicz	Krzysztof Bobecki	No fifth coach
7	Team Tomson & Baron	Team Natalia	Team Andrzej	Team Maria	No fifth coach
7	Weronika Curyło	Ania Karwan	Mateusz Grędziński	Katarzyna Góras	No fifth coach
7	Marcelina Mróz	Damian Rybicki	Sami Harb	Mateusz Guzowski	No fifth coach
7	Tomasz Trzeszczyński	Patryk Wasilewski	Łukasz Bąkowski	Ewelina Przybyła	No fifth coach
7	Filip Lato	Olga Barej	Ania Waszkiewicz	Aga Damrych	No fifth coach
8	Team Andrzej	Team Maria	Team Michał	Team Tomson & Baron	No fifth coach
8	Michał Szczygieł	Maja Kapłon	Marta Gałuszewska	Łukasz Łyczkowski	No fifth coach
8	Artur Wołk-Lewanowicz	Magdalena "Meg" Krzemień	Aga Dębowska	Sabina Mustaeva	No fifth coach
8	Martyna Pawłowska	Asia "Azzja" Mądry	Jacek Wolny	Jelena Matula	No fifth coach
8	Dave Adamaszwili	Brian Fentress	Magdalena Dąbkowska	Magdalena Janicka	No fifth coach
9	Team Grzegorz	Team Patrycja	Team Michał	Team Piotr	No fifth coach
9	Ania Deko	Marcin Sójka	Natalia Zastępa	Maksymilian Kwapień	No fifth coach
9	Aleksandra Tocka	Gosia Pauka	Izabela Szafrańska	Diana Ciecierska	No fifth coach
9	Natalia Capelik-Muianga	Maksymilian Łapiński	Wioleta Markowska	Mario Szaban	No fifth coach
9	Nicole Kulesza	Dawid Dubajka	Natalia Smagacka	Aleksandra Smerechańska	No fifth coach
10	Team Michał	Team Tomson & Baron	Team Margaret	Team Kamil	No fifth coach
10	Daria Reczek	Alicja Szemplińska	Tadeusz Seibert	Damian Kulej	No fifth coach
10	Jakub Dąbrowski	Bartosz Deryło	Stanisław Ślęzak	Kasjan Cieśla	No fifth coach
10	Piotr Szewczyk	Patryk Żywczyk	Sonia Michalczuk	Julia Olędzka	No fifth coach
10	Magdalena Ollar	Adrian Burek	Sonia Hornatkiewicz	Ada Nasiadka	No fifth coach
11	Team Edyta	Team Michał	Team Urszula	Team Tomson & Baron	No fifth coach
11	Anna Gąsienica-Byrcyn	Krystian Ochman	Jędrzej Skiba	Adam Kalinowski	No fifth coach
11	Anna Nadkierniczna	Mikołaj Macioszczyk	Martyna Zygadło	Natalia Szczypuła	No fifth coach
11	Ignacy Błażejowski	Mateusz Psonak	Anna Malek	Bartosz Utracki	No fifth coach
11	Marta Bielawska	Wojciech Lechończak	Sylwia Wysocka	Michał Bober	No fifth coach
12	Team Sylwia	Team Tomson & Baron	Team Justyna	Team Marek	No fifth coach
12	Rafał Kozik	Wiktor Dyduła	Marta Burdynowicz	Bartosz Madej	No fifth coach
12	Julia Stolpe	Paulina Gołębiowska	Monika Wiśniowska-Basel	Karolina „Kay Ra” Robinson	No fifth coach
12	Igor Kowalski	Wiktor Kowalski	Adrianna Owczarczyk & Paulina Szymlek	Anna Hnatowicz-Cholewa	No fifth coach
12	Daniel Hawes	Elżbieta Łoboda	Daniel Jodłowski	Karolina Piątek	No fifth coach
13	Team Tomson & Baron	Team Justyna	Team Lanberry	Team Marek	No fifth coach
13	Dominik Dudek	Ewelina Gancewska	Łukasz Drapała	Konrad Baum	No fifth coach
13	Tetiana "Aelin" Diachenko	Julianna Olańska	Norbert Wronka	Bogdan Świerczek	No fifth coach
13	Evgen Peltek	Zofia Kurowska	Anna Buczkowska	Julia Szarlińska	No fifth coach
13	Martin Rybczyński	Sandra Reizer	Daria Waleriańczyk	Nobesuthu Lisa Khumalo	No fifth coach
14					No fifth coach
14	Becky Sangolo	Maja Walentynowicz	Jan Górka	Antoni Zimnal	No fifth coach
14	Paweł Kozicz	Bartosz Michniewicz	Daniel Borzewski	Michał Sołtan	No fifth coach
14	Łukasz Samburski	Max Miszczyk	Damazy Wachuła	Nicola Muller	No fifth coach
14	Monika Kluszczyńska	Oliwia Skrzypczyk	Martyna Lasiecka	Dominika Krassowska	No fifth coach
15					No fifth coach
15	Team Tomson & Baron	Team Lanberry	Team Kuba	Team Michał	No fifth coach
15	Kacper Andrzejewski	Izabela Płóciennik	Anna Iwanek	Mikołaj Przybylski	No fifth coach
15	Julia Konik-Rańda	Yaroslav Rohalskyi	Maciej Rumiński	Klaudia Stelmasiak	No fifth coach
15	Natalia Tul	Aleksandra Leśniewicz	Adrianna Ropela	Bartłomiej Michałek	No fifth coach
15	Alicja Kalinowska	Maciej Kita	Julia Jadczyszyn	Iga Ośko	No fifth coach
16	Team Tomson & Baron	Team Margaret	Team Kuba	Team Michał	Team Ania K.
16	Mateusz Jagiełło	Jan Piwowarczyk	Łukasz Reks	Hanna Kuzimowicz	Żaneta Chełminiak
16	Kinga Rutkowska	Filip Mettler	Michael Böhm	Dominik Czuż	Mateusz Włodarczyk
16	Marcin Spenner	Magdalena Chołuj	Julia Wasilewska	Joanna Lupa	—N/a
16	Roksana Ostojska	Gabriela Kurzac	Zhanetta Saparava	Kasia Skiba	—N/a
17	Team Kuba	Team Tomson & Baron	Team Edyta	Team Michał	Team Ania K.
17	Kinga Wylęgły	Anna Nguyen	Jarosław Weber	Amelia Mitoraj	Axel Feige
17	Sandra Rusin	Zosia Kosińska	Pamela Matyska	Kuba Adamus	Ula Kozielska
17	Karolina Łopuch	Kacper Bator	Roksana Walczak	Iga Posta	—N/a
17	Dominika Siwek	Asia Mądry	Amelia Wróblewska	Beniamin Nowakowski	—N/a

== Series overview ==
Warning: the following table presents a significant amount of different colors

Teams color key
Artist from Team Andrzej	Artist from Team Maria	Artist from Team Margaret
Artist from Team Ania D.	Artist from Team Edyta G.	Artist from Team Ula
Artist from Team Kayah	Artist from Team Natalia	Artist from Team Sylwia
Artist from Team Nergal	Artist from Team Michał	Artist from Team Lanberry
Artist from Team Justyna	Artist from Team Grzegorz	Artist from Team Kuba
Artist from Team Marek	Artist from Team Piotr	Artist from Team Ania K.
Artist from Team Patrycja	Artist from Team Kamil	Artist from Team Edyta B.
Artist from Team Tomson & Baron

The Voice series overview
Season	Year	Winner	Runner-up	Third place	Fourth place	Fifth place	Winning coach	Main hosts	
1	2011	Damian Ukeje	Antoni Smykiewicz	Piotr Niesłuchowski	Mateusz Krautwurst	—N/a	Nergal	Hubert Urbański	Magdalena Mielcarz
2	2013	Natalia Sikora	Dorota Osińska	Michał Sobierajski	Natalia Nykiel	—N/a	Marek Piekarczyk	Tomasz Kammel	Marika
3	2013	Mateusz Ziółko	Ernest Staniaszek	Arkadiusz Kłusowski	Jagoda Kret	—N/a	Maria Sadowska	Tomasz Kammel	Marika
4	2014	Juan Carlos Cano	Katarzyna Sawczuk	Maja Gawłowska	Aleksandra Węglewicz	—N/a	Maria Sadowska	Tomasz Kammel	Marika
5	2014	Aleksandra Nizio	Przemysław Radziszewski	Gracjan Kalandyk	Magdalena Paradziej	—N/a	Justyna Steczkowska	Tomasz Kammel	Magdalena Mielcarz
6	2015	Krzysztof Iwaneczko	Tobiasz Staniszewski	Ana Andrzejewska	William Prestigiacomo	—N/a	Maria Sadowska	Tomasz Kammel	Halina Mlynkova
7	2016	Mateusz Grędziński	Weronika Curyło	Ania Karwan	Katarzyna Góras	—N/a	Andrzej Piaseczny	Tomasz Kammel	Barbara; Kurdej-Szatan
8	2017	Marta Gałuszewska	Łukasz Łyczkowski	Michał Szczygieł	Maja Kapłon	—N/a	Michał Szpak	Tomasz Kammel	Barbara; Kurdej-Szatan
9	2018	Marcin Sójka	Natalia Zastępa	Anna Deko	Maksymilian Kwapień	—N/a	Patrycja Markowska	Tomasz Kammel	Barbara; Kurdej-Szatan
10	2019	Alicja Szemplińska	Daria Reczek	Tadeusz Seibert	Damian Kulej	—N/a	Tomson & Baron	Tomasz Kammel	Maciej Musiał
11	2020	Krystian Ochman	Adam Kalinowski	Anna Byrcyn	Jędrzej Skiba	—N/a	Michał Szpak	Tomasz Kammel	Maciej Musiał
12	2021	Marta Burdynowicz	Bartosz Madej	Rafał Kozik	Wiktor Dyduła	—N/a	Justyna Steczkowska	Tomasz Kammel	Małgorzata; Tomaszewska
13	2022	Dominik Dudek	Łukasz Drapała	Konrad Baum	Ewelina Gancewska	—N/a	Tomson & Baron	Tomasz Kammel	Małgorzata; Tomaszewska
14	2023	Jan Górka	Antoni Zimnal	Becky Sangolo	Maja Walentynowicz	—N/a	Lanberry	Tomasz Kammel	
15	2024	Anna Iwanek	Mikołaj Przybylski	Kacper Andrzejewski	Izabela Płóciennik	—N/a	Kuba Badach	Paulina Chylewska	Maciej Musiał
16	2025	Jan Piwowarczyk	Hanna Kuzimowicz	Mateusz Jagiełło	Łukasz Reks	Żaneta Chełminiak	Margaret	Paulina Chylewska	Maciej Musiał
17	2026	Current season						Paulina Chylewska	Maciej Musiał

=== Coaches' results ===
Considering the final placement of the contestants who are members of their team (not the final placement of the coaches):

Coaches' results
Coach	Winner	Runner-up	Third place	Fourth place	Fifth place
Maria Sadowska	Thrice (3–4, 6)	—	—	Twice (7–8)	—
Tomson & Baron	Twice (10, 13)	5 times (2, 6–8, 11)	5 times (3–4, 14–16)	Once (12)	—
Michał Szpak	Twice (8, 11)	4 times (9–10, 15–16)	—	—	—
Justyna Steczkowska	Twice (5, 12)	Once (4)	Twice (2, 5)	Twice (13–14)	—
Marek Piekarczyk	Once (2)	Thrice (3, 12, 14)	Once (13)	Twice (4–5)	—
Andrzej Piaseczny	Once (7)	Once (1)	Once (8)	Once (6)	—
Lanberry	Once (14)	Once (13)	—	Once (15)	—
Margaret	Once (16)	—	Once (10)	—	—
Kuba Badach	Once (15)	—	—	Once (16)	—
Patrycja Markowska	Once (9)	—	—	Once (2)	—
Nergal	Once (1)	—	—	—	—
Edyta Górniak	—	Once (5)	Twice (6, 11)	Once (3)	—
Sylwia Grzeszczak	—	—	Once (12)	—	—
Grzegorz Hyży	—	—	Once (9)	—	—
Natalia Kukulska	—	—	Once (7)	—	—
Ania Dąbrowska	—	—	Once (1)	—	—
Urszula Dudziak	—	—	—	Once (11)	—
Kamil Bednarek	—	—	—	Once (10)	—
Piotr Cugowski	—	—	—	Once (9)	—
Kayah	—	—	—	Once (1)	—
Ania Karwan	—	—	—	—	Once (16)
Edyta Bartosiewicz	TBA				

=== Season 1 (2011) ===
The judges for season 1 were Ania Dąbrowska, Adam "Nergal" Darski, Kayah and Andrzej Piaseczny. The show was hosted by Hubert Urbański, Magdalena Mielcarz and Mateusz Szymkowiak. The winner of the first series in 2011 was Damian Ukeje from Team Nergal.

=== Season 2 (2013) ===
The second season premiered on March 2, 2013. The judges were Justyna Steczkowska, Patrycja Markowska, Marek Piekarczyk and Tomson & Baron from Afromental. The show was hosted by Tomasz Kammel, Marika and Maciej Musiał. The winner of the second series was Natalia Sikora from Team Marek.

=== Season 3 (2013) ===
The third season premiered on September 7, 2013. The judges were Marek Piekarczyk, Tomson & Baron, Maria Sadowska and Edyta Górniak. Tomasz Kammel, Marika and Maciej Musiał returned. The winner of the third series was Mateusz Ziółko from Team Maria.

=== Season 4 (2014) ===
The fourth season premiered on March 1, 2014. The judges were Justyna Steczkowska, Tomson & Baron, Maria Sadowska and Marek Piekarczyk. All hosts from the previous season returned. The winner of the fourth series was Juan Carlos Cano from Team

=== Season 5 (2014) ===
The fifth season premiered on September 6, 2014. The judges were Justyna Steczkowska, Tomson & Baron, Edyta Górniak and Marek Piekarczyk. The show was hosted by Tomasz Kammel, Magdalena Mielcarz and Maciej Musiał. The winner of the fifth series was Aleksandra Nizio from Team Justyna.

=== Season 6 (2015) ===
The sixth season premiered on September 5, 2015. The judges were Edyta Górniak, Tomson & Baron, Maria Sadowska and Andrzej Piaseczny. The show was hosted by Tomasz Kammel, Halina Mlynkova and Maciej Musiał. The winner of the sixth series was Krzysztof Iwaneczko from Team Maria.

=== Season 7 (2016) ===
The seventh season premiered on September 3, 2016. The judges were Tomson & Baron, Maria Sadowska, Andrzej Piaseczny and Natalia Kukulska, who replaced Edyta Górniak. The show was hosted by Tomasz Kammel, Barbara Kurdej-Szatan and Maciej Musiał. The winner of the seventh series was Mateusz Grędziński from Team Andrzej.

=== Season 8 (2017) ===
The eighth season premiered on September 2, 2017. The judges were Tomson & Baron, Maria Sadowska, Andrzej Piaseczny and Michał Szpak, who replaced Natalia Kukulska. The show was hosted by Tomasz Kammel, Maciej Musiał and Barbara Kurdej-Szatan. The winner of the eight series was Marta Gałuszewska from Team Michał.

=== Season 9 (2018) ===
The ninth season premiered on September 1, 2018. Michał Szpak became the coach again. Tomson & Baron, Maria Sadowska and Andrzej Piaseczny resigned from the function of coaches, and their place was taken by: Patrycja Markowska returning to the program, who previously acted as a coach in the second edition of the program, and debuting in this role Grzegorz Hyży and Piotr Cugowski. The show was hosted by Tomasz Kammel, Barbara Kurdej-Szatan and Maciej Musiał.The winner of the ninth series was Marcin Sójka from Team Patrycja.

=== Season 10 (2019) ===
The tenth season premiered on September 7, 2019. Michał Szpak became a coach again. Patrycja Markowska, Piotr Cugowski and Grzegorz Hyży were replaced by Kamil Bednarek, Margaret and Tomson & Baron returning after a one-season break. The show was hosted by Tomasz Kammel, Marcelina Zawadzka and Maciej Musiał. Barbara Kurdej-Szatan resigned from the function of presenter. The winner of the tenth series was Alicja Szemplińska from Team Tomson & Baron.

=== Season 11 (2020) ===
The eleventh season premiered on September 12, 2020. Michał Szpak and Tomson & Baron became the coaches again. Margaret and Kamil Bednarek were replaced by Edyta Górniak, returning after a five-year break and a new coach Urszula Dudziak. The show was hosted by Tomasz Kammel, Maciej Musiał and Małgorzata Tomaszewska. Marcelina Zawadzka resigned from the function of presenter. The winner of the eleventh series was Krystian Ochman from Team Michał.

=== Season 12 (2021) ===
The twelfth season premiered on September 11, 2021. Tomson & Baron became the coaches again. Michał Szpak, Urszula Dudziak and Edyta Górniak were replaced by Justyna Steczkowska and Marek Piekarczyk, both returning after seven-year break and a new coach Sylwia Grzeszczak. The show was hosted by Tomasz Kammel, Małgorzata Tomaszewska, Aleksander Sikora and Michał Szczygieł. Maciej Musiał and Adam Zdrójkowski resigned from the function of the hosts. The winner of the twelfth series was Marta Burdynowicz from Team Justyna.

=== Season 13 (2022) ===
The thirteenth season premiered on September 3, 2022. On June 19, 2022, Justyna Steczkowska confirmed that she would return as a coach in the thirteenth season. On August 7, 2022, it was announced that Tomson & Baron, Marek Piekarczyk and a new coach Lanberry would join Justyna Steczkowska as coaches this season. The show was hosted by Tomasz Kammel, Małgorzata Tomaszewska and Aleksander Sikora. The winner of the thirteenth series was Dominik Dudek from Team Tomson & Baron.

=== Season 14 (2023) ===
The fourteenth season premiered on September 2, 2023. On August 8, 2023, it was confirmed that all coaches from the previous season would return in the upcoming season, making it the first time in the history of the show, when there is not any change in the coaching line-up. The show was hosted by Tomasz Kammel, who was joined by Aleksander Sikora during the Live shows. The winner of the fourteenth series was Jan Górka from Team Lanberry.

=== Season 15 (2024) ===
The fifteenth season premiered on September 7, 2024. Among the coaches from the previous season, Tomson & Baron and Lanberry returned for their thirteenth and third seasons, respectively. Michał Szpak returned as a coach for his fifth season after a three-season hiatus. Additionally, Kuba Badach joined the panel this season as a new coach. On August 2, 2024, it was confirmed that Paulina Chylewska would make her debut as the main host, replacing Tomasz Kammel. On August 5, 2024, it was announced that Maciej Musiał would return as the second host after a three-season hiatus, replacing Aleksander Sikora. The winner of the fifteenth series was Anna Iwanek from Team Kuba.

=== Season 16 (2025) ===
The sixteenth season premiered on September 6, 2025. This season introduces the "Comeback Stage" feature along with the fifth additional coach mentoring the contestants who failed to succeed in the Blind Auditions. On August 1, 2025, it was announced that Margaret would return to the show as a coach after a five-season hiatus. On August 4, 2025, it was announced that Tomson & Baron, Michał Szpak, and Kuba Badach would return as coaches for their fourteenth, sixth, and second seasons, respectively. On August 5, 2025, it was announced that season 7 finalist Ania Karwan would become the Comeback Stage coach for the sixteenth season. The winner of the sixteenth series was Jan Piwowarczyk from Team Margaret.

=== Season 17 (2026) ===
The seventeenth season premiered on September 12, 2026. On August 3, 2026, it was announced that Tomson & Baron, Michał Szpak, and Kuba Badach would return as main coaches for their fifteenth, seventh, and third seasons, respectively, alongside Edyta Bartosiewicz, who would replace Margaret as the new main coach. Additionally, Ania Karwan reprised her role as the Comeback Stage coach this season.
