= The Voice of Poland season 17 =

2026 season of Polish television show

The Voice of Poland
- Season 17
- Promotional poster featuring coaches Baron, Tomson, Bartosiewicz, Szpak, and Badach
- Hosted by: Paulina Chylewska; Maciej Musiał
- Judges: Kuba Badach; Tomson & Baron; Edyta Bartosiewicz; Michał Szpak; Ania Karwan (Comeback Stage)
- No. of contestants: 58

Release
- Original network: TVP 2, TVP VOD
- Original release: September 12, 2026 – present

Season chronology
- ← Previous; Season 16

The seventeenth season of the Polish singing competition The Voice of Poland began airing on September 12, 2026, on TVP 2. It is airing on Saturdays at 20:30. Tomson & Baron, Michał Szpak, and Kuba Badach returned to the show as coaches for their fifteenth, seventh, and third seasons, respectively. Additionally, Edyta Bartosiewicz joined the show as the new main coach. Ania Karwan, who became the first Comeback Stage coach in the history of the show, reprised her role as an additional coach this season.

== Overview ==
=== Development ===
On May 1, 2026, TVP announced that The Voice of Poland was renewed for a seventeenth season to air in the fall of that year.

=== Coaches and hosts ===
On August 3, 2026, it was announced that Edyta Bartosiewicz, who had been invited to become a coach since the first season, would become the new main coach, replacing Margaret, who resigned from the panel to focus on her upcoming album. Also, Paulina Chylewska and Maciej Musiał return as the main hosts. Additionally, it was announced that Tomson & Baron, Michał Szpak, and Kuba Badach would return as coaches from the previous season for their fifteenth, seventh, and third seasons, respectively.

=== The Voice Comeback Stage Powered by Orange feature ===
On August 5, 2026, it was announced that Ania Karwan would return as a fifth coach for her second season, mentoring unsuccessful auditioners on an online version in the second chance round.

Coaches and hosts of The Voice of Poland Season 17

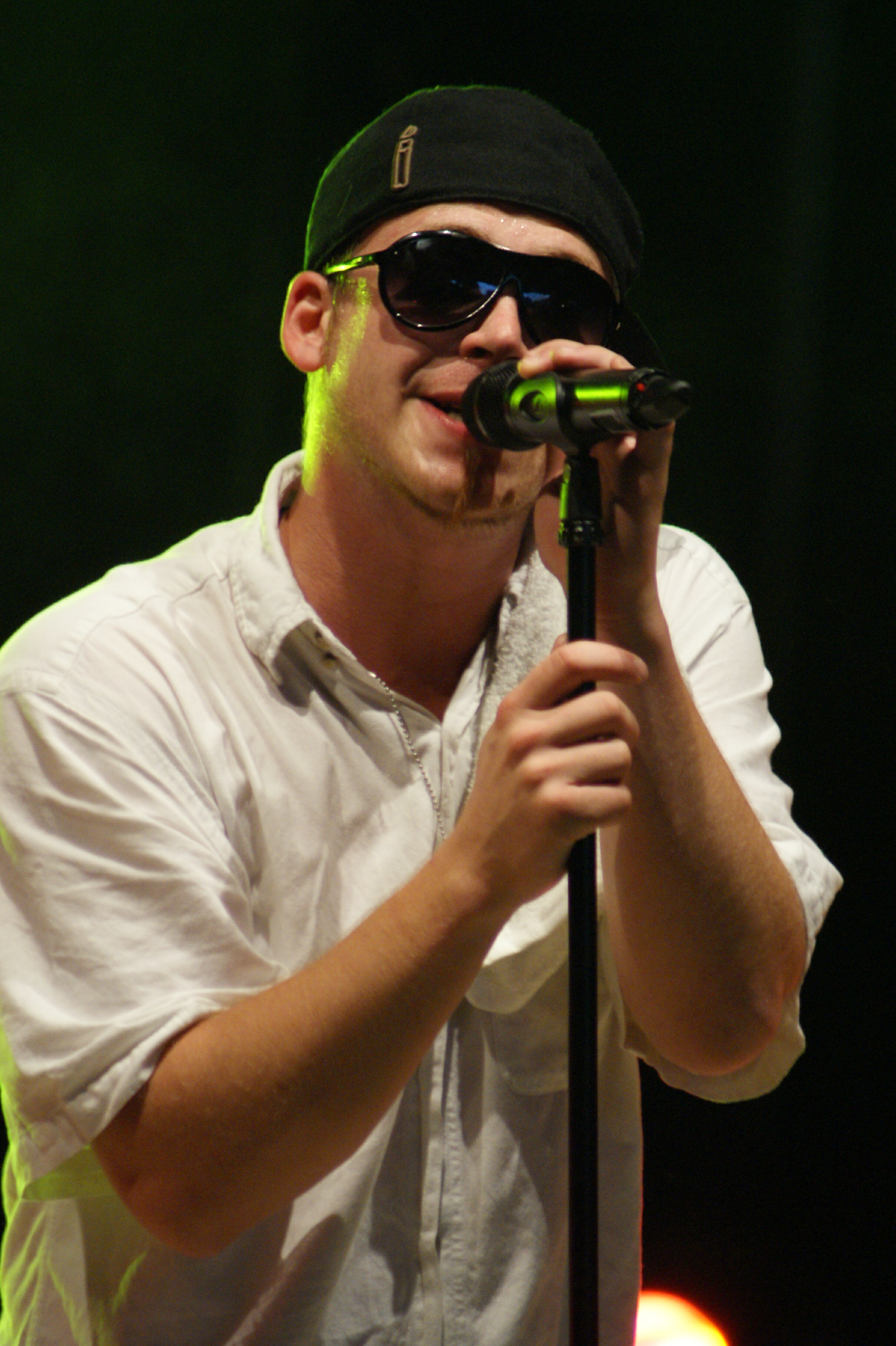
Tomson

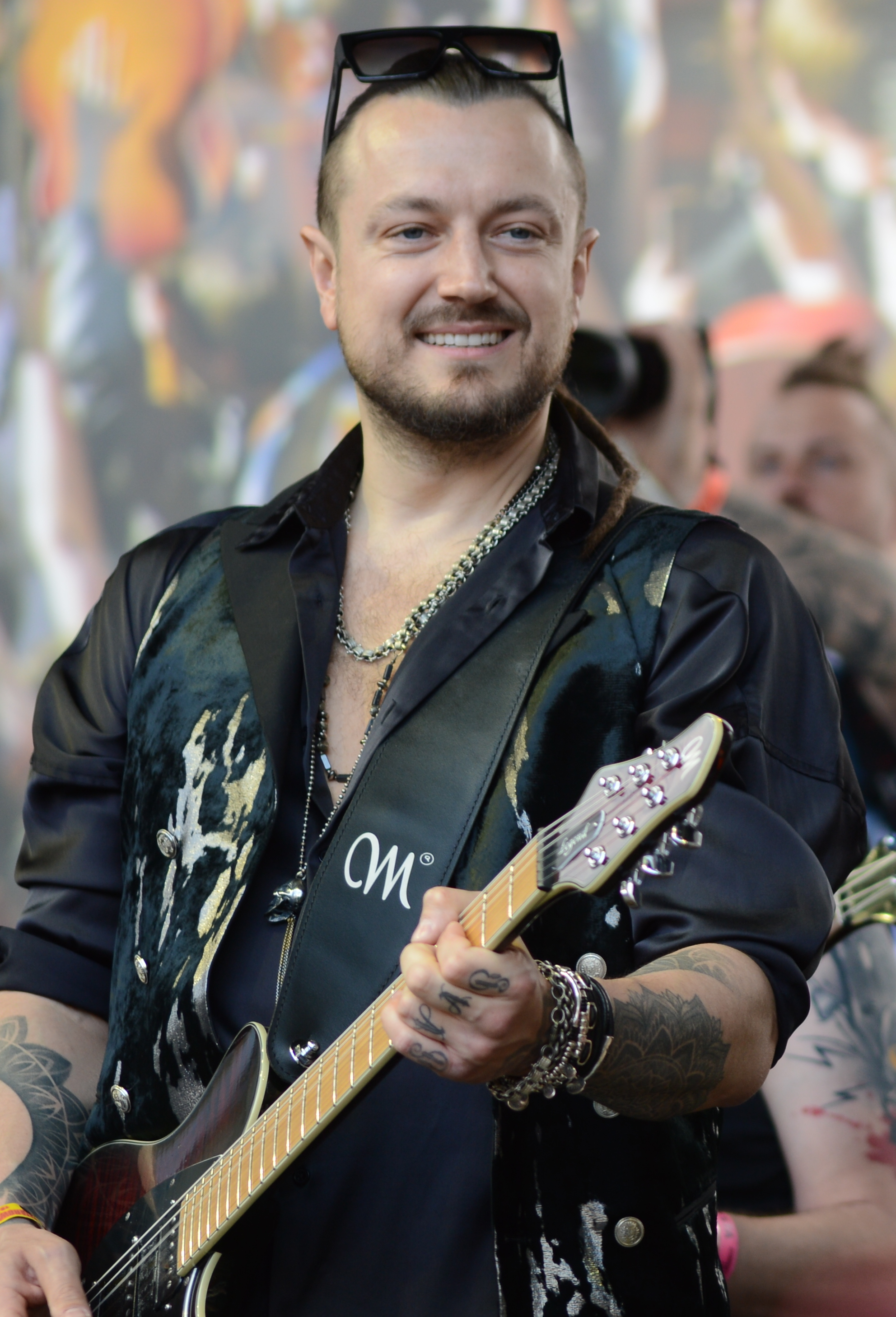
Baron

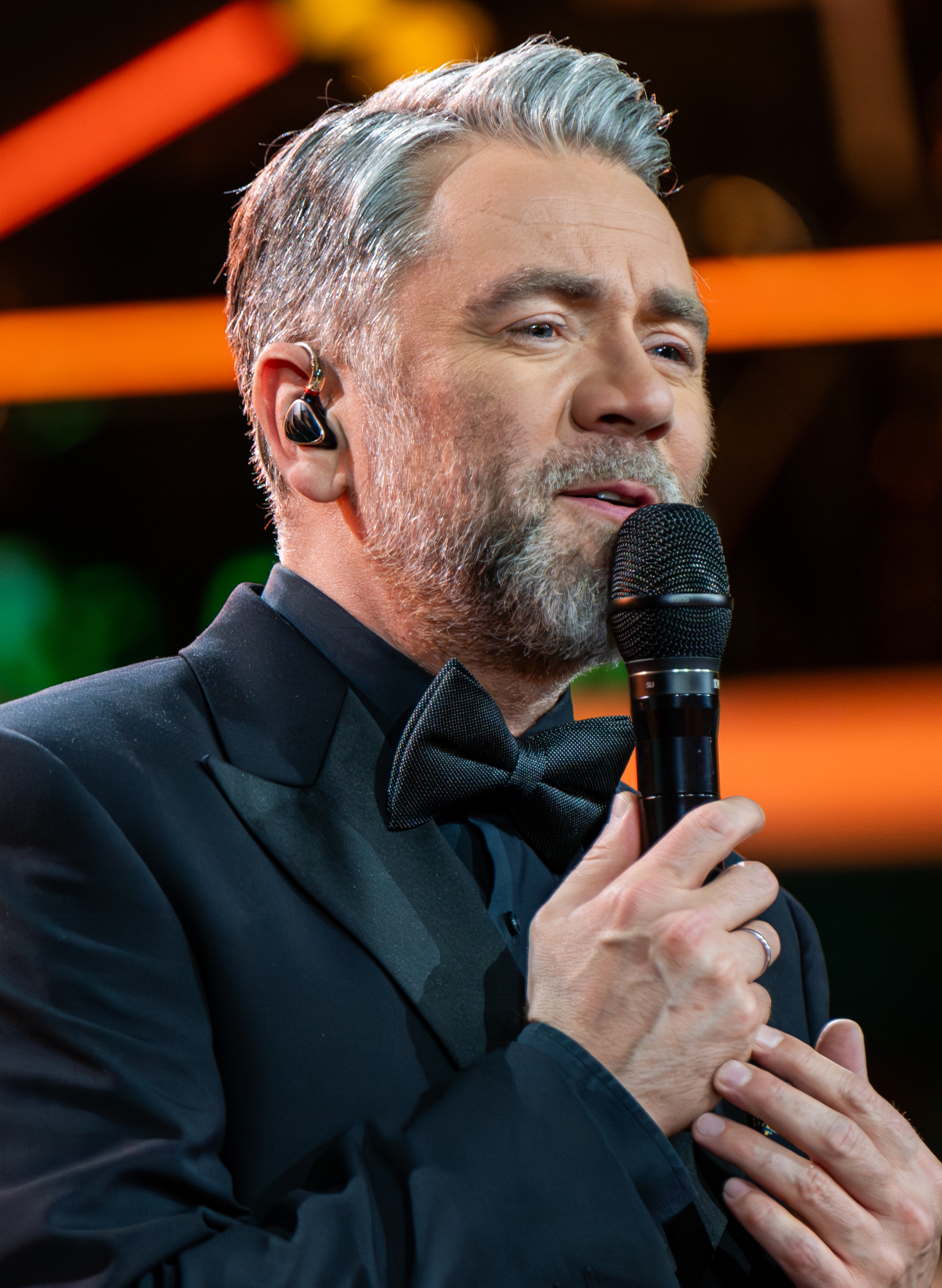
Kuba Badach

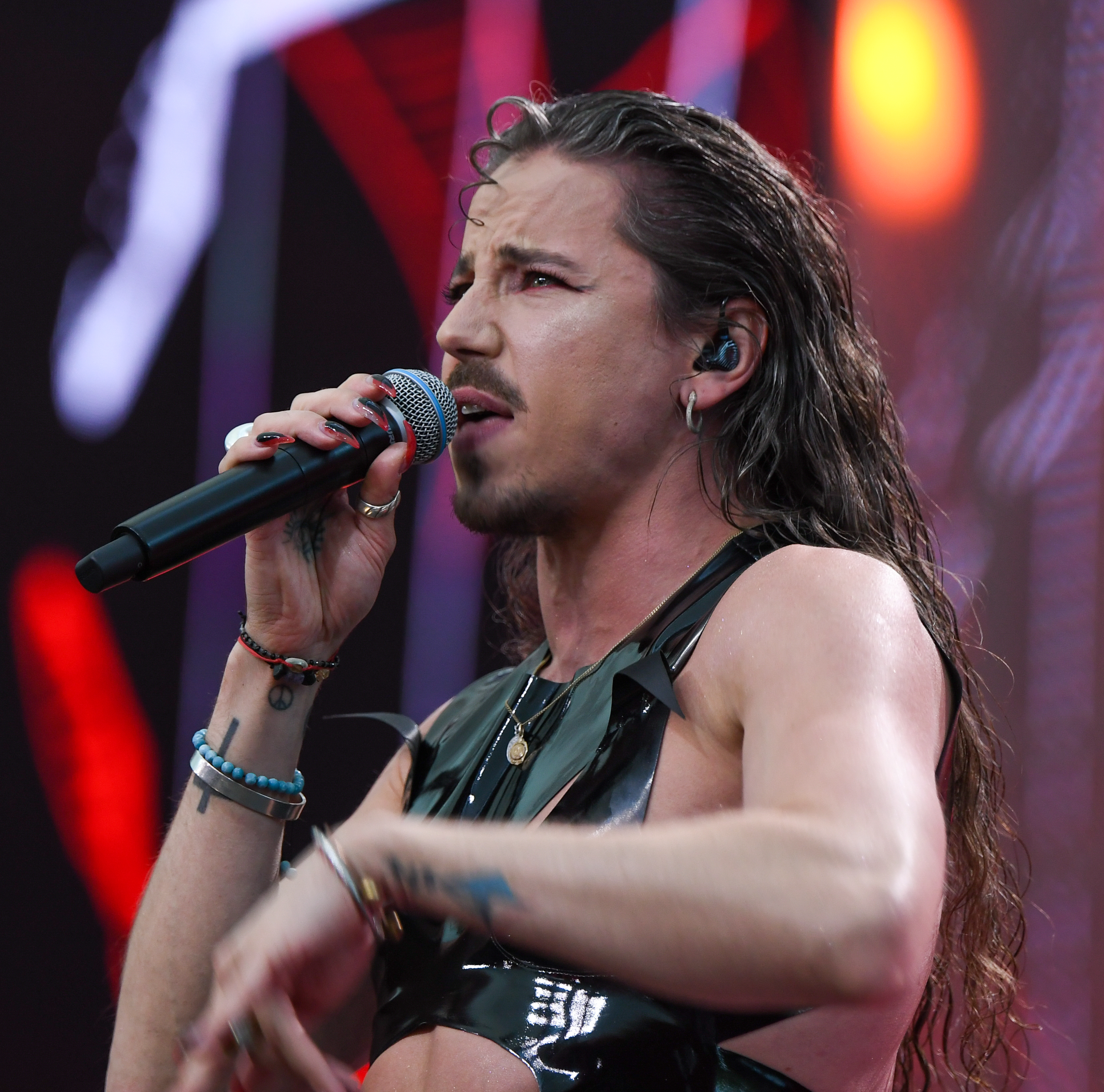
Michał Szpak

Edyta Bartosiewicz

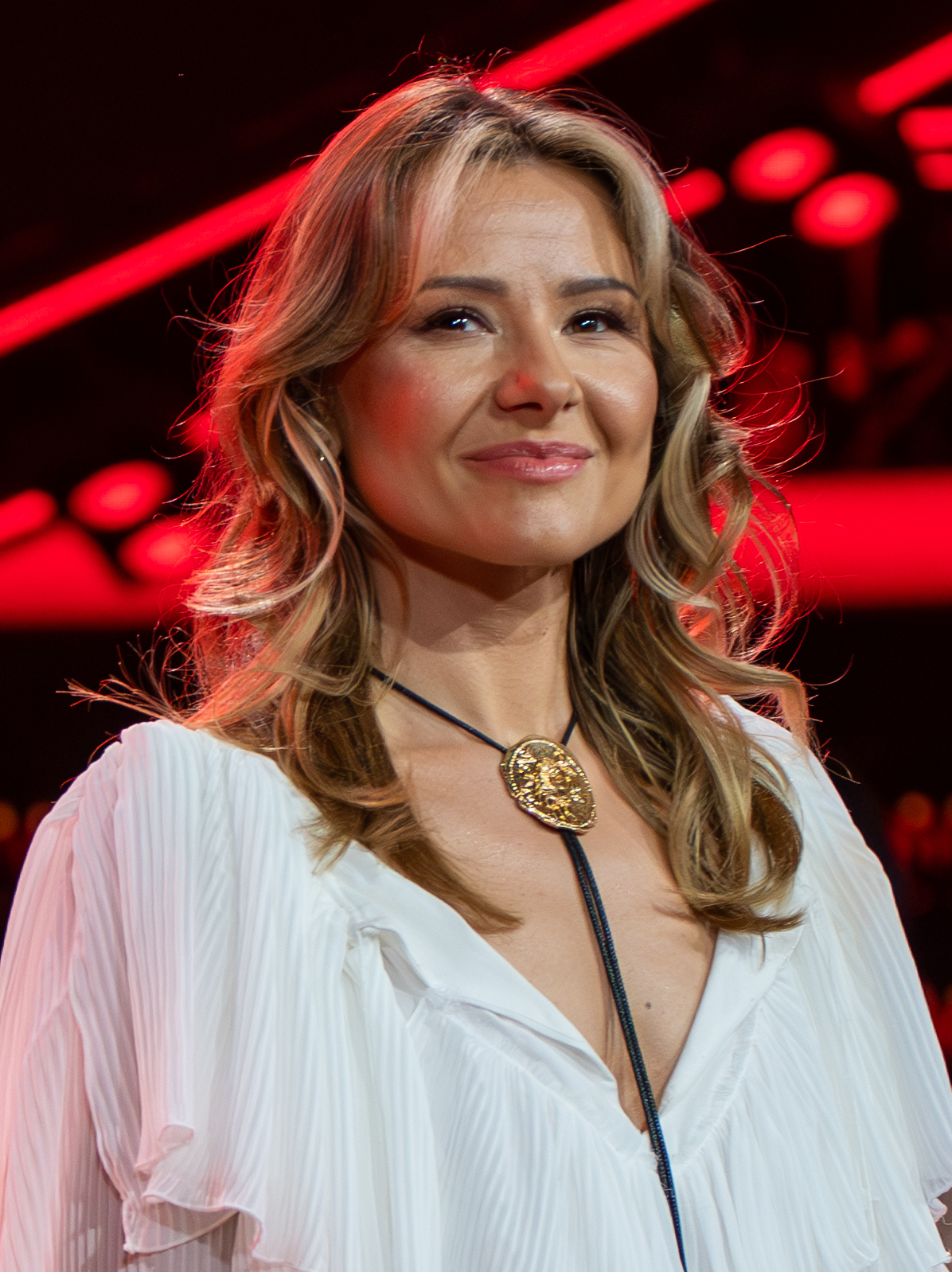
Ania Karwan (Comeback Stage)

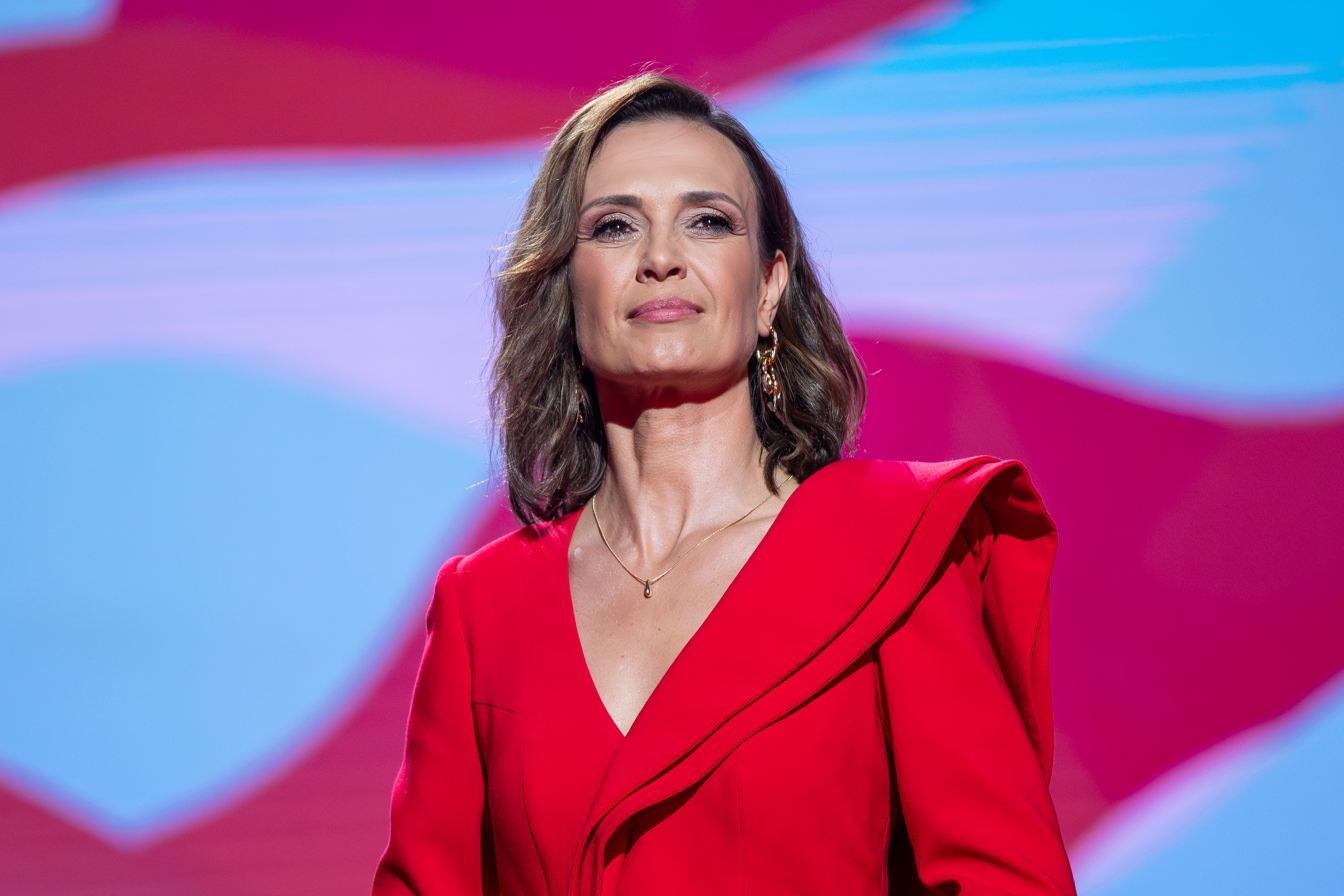
Paulina Chylewska (host)

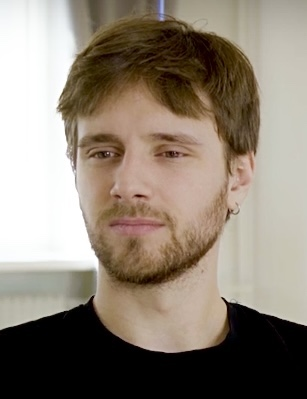
Maciej Musiał (host)

== Teams ==
Main Competition

- Winner
- Runner-up
- Third place
- Fourth place
- Fifth place
- Eliminated in the Semifinals
- Eliminated in the Quarterfinals
- Eliminated in the Live Playoffs
- Eliminated in the Knockout round
- Selected for the Comeback Stage
- Artist was stolen by another coach (Name is struck through)
- Artist was stolen but was later switched with another artist and got eliminated
- Eliminated in the Battle rounds

The Comeback Stage

- Eliminated in the Semifinals
- Eliminated of viewers voting in the app
- Eliminated in the Knockout rounds
- Eliminated in the Second Battle rounds
- Artist was stolen but was later switched with another artist and got eliminated
- Eliminated in the First Battle rounds

Coaches' teams
Coach	Top 58 Artists					
Kuba Badach						
Kuba Badach	Kinga Wylęgły	Sandra Rusin	Karolina Łopuch	Dominika Siwek	~~Julia Szarek~~	Gosia Stępień
Kuba Badach	Oliwia Panaś	~~Roksana Walczak~~	Kuba Gąsowski	Agnieszka Bojarska	Zuzanna Łukawska	Małgorzata Sikora
Kuba Badach	Wiktoria Smaga					
Tomson & Baron						
Tomson & Baron	Anna Nguyen	Zosia Kosińska	Kacper Bator	Asia Mądry	~~Ula Kozielska~~	Tosia Biały
Tomson & Baron	Kuba Rayman	~~Agnieszka Moskwa~~	Tomasz Bao	Angela Gierłowska	Ania Gromala	Hania Pliszka
Tomson & Baron	Nikola Szkodlarska					
Edyta Bartosiewicz						
Edyta Bartosiewicz	Jarosław Weber	Pamela Matyska	Roksana Walczak	Amelia Wróblewska	~~Kamila Kiecoń~~	Maria Majewska
Edyta Bartosiewicz	Alex Opolski	~~Tosia Biały~~	~~Iga Posta~~	~~Sandra Rusin~~	Aleksandra Betańska	Klaudia Chyczewska
Edyta Bartosiewicz	Martyna Małek					
Michał Szpak						
Michał Szpak	Amelia Mitoraj	Kuba Adamus	Iga Posta	Beniamin Nowakowski	~~Pola Deptuła~~	Stasiu Szewliński
Michał Szpak	Karolina Jarzyńska	~~Julia Matczak~~	~~Paulina Tarasińska~~	Ewelina Bogucka	Kasia Lach	Roksana Wierzbicka
Michał Szpak	Wiktoria Zjawiony					
Ania Karwan						
Ania Karwan	Axel Feige	Ula Kozielska	Magda Hanasuek	Gosia Kutrowska	Kacper Hyży	Natalia Brzezińska
Ania Karwan	Justyna Rainko-Sulich	Marta Marzejewska	Martyna Łukaszczyk	Michał Opach	Agnieszka Moskwa	Julia Matczak
Ania Karwan	Paulina Tarasińska	Julia Szarek	Pola Deptuła	Kamila Kiecoń	Adrianna Szymczak	
Note: Italicized names are contestants stolen from another team during the battles (names struck through within former teams).

== Blind auditions ==
The show is set to begin with the Blind Auditions on September 12, 2026. In each audition, a contestant sings their piece in front of the coaches whose chairs are facing the audience. If a coach is interested to work with the artist, they will press their button to face the artist. If a singular coach presses the button, the contestant automatically becomes part of their team. If multiple coaches turn, they will compete for the contestant, who will decide which team they will join. Each coach has two "blocks" to prevent another coach from getting an artist, but they can use them only after a contestant's performance. Each coach ends up with 12 artists by the end of the blind auditions, creating a total of 48 contestants advancing to the battles.

Blind auditions color key
✔	Coach pressed "I WANT YOU" button
	Artist joined this coach's team
	Artist selected to join this coach's team
	Artist was eliminated and was not invited back for "The Comeback Stage"
	Artist was eliminated, but got a second chance to compete in "The Comeback Stage"
✘	Coach pressed "I WANT YOU" button, but was blocked by another coach from getting the artist
	Blocked by Kuba Blocked by Tomson & Baron Blocked by Edyta Blocked by Michał

=== Week 1 (September 12) ===
The Coaches performed "Holding Out for a Hero" by Bonnie Tyler at the beginning of show.

Week one auditions results
Order	Artist	Song	Coach's and artist's choices			
Order	Artist	Song	Kuba	Tomson & Baron	Edyta	Michał
1	Jarosław Weber	"Drive"	✔	✔	✔	✔
2	Julia Matczak	"Hedonism"	—	—	—	✔
3	Alex Opolski	"Africa"	—	✔	✔	✔
4	Pamela Matyska	"Ale jestem"	✔	—	✔	✔
5	Kuba Gąsowski	"What Now My Love"	✔	—	✔	✔
6	Klaudia Mastalerz	"W domach z betonu"	—	—	—	—
7	Anna Nguyen	"I Want Love"	—	✔	✔	✔
8	Kuba Adamus	"Mr. Know It All"	✔	✔	✔	✔
9	Michał Opach	"Mała"	—	—	—	—
10	Wiktoria Zjawiony	"About Damn Time"	—	—	—	✔
11	Adrianna Szymczak	"W co mam wierzyć"	—	—	—	—
12	Zosia Kosińska	"Messy"	✔	✔	✔	✔

=== Week 2 (September 19) ===
Week two auditions results
Order	Artist	Song	Coach's and artist's choices			
Order	Artist	Song	Kuba	Tomson & Baron	Edyta	Michał
1	Ula Kozielska	"I Just Might"	✔	✔	✔	✔
2	Tomasz Bao	"Azizam"	✔	✔	—	—
3	Gosia Stępień	"Rescue Me"	✔	—	✔	✔
4	Amelia Wróblewska	"Heather"	—	—	✔	—
5	Roksana Wierzbicka	"List"	—	✔	—	✔
6	Iga Posta	"L’appuntamento"	✔	—	✔	✔
7	Magda Hanasuek	"Fast Car"	—	—	—	—
8	Nikola Szkodlarska	"Koła czasu"	—	✔	—	—
9	Pola Deptuła	"Ai No Corrida"	✔	—	—	✔
10	Beniamin Nowakowski	"The Night We Met"	✔	—	—	✔
11	Gosia Kutrowska	"Still Loving You"	—	—	—	—
12	Ania Gromala	"Dwa proste słowa"	—	✔	—	—
13	Asia Mądry	"Maybe"	✔	✔	—	✔

=== Week 3 (September 26) ===
Week three auditions results
Order	Artist	Song	Coach's and artist's choices			
Order	Artist	Song	Kuba	Tomson & Baron	Edyta	Michał
1	Oliwia Panaś	"Midnight Sky"	✔	—	—	✔
2	Martyna Małek	"Murder on the Dance Floor"	—	—	✔	—
3	Ewelina Bogucka	"Crush"	—	—	—	✔
4	Agnieszka Moskwa	"Get Here"	—	✔	—	✔
5	Kacper Hyży	"Mamony milion"	—	—	—	—
6	Kinga Wylęgły	"16 Carriages"	✔	✔	✔	✔
7	Kasia Lach	"Je t'aime"	—	✔	—	✔
8	Kuba Rayman	"Popdalmy to"	—	✔	—	—
9	Klaudia Chyczewska	"Maneater"	—	—	✔	—
10	Natalia Brzezińśka	"Flirt"	—	—	—	—
11	Stasiu Szewieliński	"Die on This Hill	—	✔	—	✔
12	Kamila Kiecoń	"Good Luck, Babe!"	—	—	✔	—
13	Tosia Biały	"Don't Cha"	—	—	✔	—

=== Week 4 (October 03) ===
Week four auditions results
Order	Artist	Song	Coach's and artist's choices			
Order	Artist	Song	Kuba	Tomson & Baron	Edyta	Michał
1	Agnieszka Bojarska	"So Easy (To Fall In Love)"	✔	—	—	—
2	Krzysztof Mrożek	"Fever Dream"	—	—	—	—
3	Hania Pliszka	"Try Sleeping with a Broken Heart"	—	✔	—	✔
4	Dominika Siwek	"Ballada o niej"	✔	—	—	—
5	Marta Mierzejewska	"Miłość jest ślepa"	—	—	—	—
6	Karolina Łopuch	"Wildflower"	✔	✔	—	—
7	Angela Gerłowska	"I Want to Know What Love Is"	—	✔	—	—
8	Amelia Mitoraj	"Forever Young"	—	✔	✔	✔
9	Ola Przewoźniak	"Opalite"	—	—	—	—
10	Kacper Bator	"Bad Dreams"	—	✔	—	✔
11	Justyna Rainko-Sulich	"Owner of a Lonely Heart"	—	—	—	—
12	Aneta Szymczyk	"Wild World"	—	—	—	—
13	Aleksandra Betańska	"Dernière danse"	✔	—	✔	—
14	Julia Szarek	"Iris"	✔	✔	✔	✔

=== Week 5 (October 10) ===
Week five auditions results
Order	Artist	Song	Coach's and artist's choices			
Order	Artist	Song	Kuba	Tomson & Baron	Edyta	Michał
1	Karolina Jarzyńska	"Midnight Sun"	✔	✔	✔	✔
2	Izabela Sobota	"Try"	—	—	—	—
3	Małgorzata Sikora	"Nikt tak pięknie nie mówił, że się boi miłości"	✔	—	—	✔
4	Jakub Wierzbowski	"Fiołkowe pole"	—	—	—	—
5	Marysia Majewska	"Dreams"	—	—	✔	—
6	Wiktoria & Joachim Ryczek	"Time After Time"	—	—	—	—
7	Zuzanna Łukawska	"Have I Told You Lately"	✔	✔	✔	✔
8	Sandra Rusin	"Pilowtalk"	✔	✔	✔	✔
9	Roksana Walczak	"One and Only"	✔	—	—	—
10	Ewa Siewieja	"The Fate of Ophelia"	—	—	—	—
11	Wiktoria Smaga	"Please Please Please"	✔	—	—	✔
12	Martyna Łukaszczyk	"Psalm stojących w kolejce"	—	—	—	—
13	Paulina Tarasińska	"In This World"	—	—	—	✔
14	Axel Feige	"Anybody Seen My Baby?"	—	—	—	—

== Battles round ==
The battles began airing on October 17, 2026 and concluded on November 7, 2026. In this round, the coaches pick two of their contestants in a singing match and then select one of them to advance to the next round. Losing contestants may be "stolen" by another coach, becoming new members of their team. Multiple coaches can attempt to steal a contestant, resulting in a competition for the contestant, who will ultimately decide which team they will go to. At the end of this round, seven contestants will remain on each team; six will be battle winners, and one from a steal. In total, 28 contestants advance to the knockouts

Battles color key
Contestant won the Battle and advanced to the Knockouts
Contestant lost the Battle but was stolen by another coach and advanced to the Knockouts
Artist lost the Battle, but got a second chance to compete in "Comeback Stage"
Contestant lost the Battle and was stolen by another coach, but was later switched with another contestant and eliminated
Contestant lost the Battle and was eliminated

Battles results
Week	Coach	Order	Winner	Song	Loser	'Steal' result			
Week	Coach	Order	Winner	Song	Loser	Kuba	Tomson & Baron	Edyta	Michał
Week 6 (October 17)	Michał	1	Karolina Jarzyńska	"Nareszcie"	Roksana Wierzbicka	–	–	–	N/A
Week 6 (October 17)	Kuba	2	Gosia Stępień	"Wonderwall"	Kuba Gąsowski	N/A	–	–	✔
Week 6 (October 17)	Edyta	3	Alex Opolski	"Między ciszą a ciszą"	Iga Posta	–	–	N/A	✔
Week 6 (October 17)	Tomson & Baron	4	Zosia Kosińska	"Pray"	Agnieszka Moskwa	✔	N/A	–	–
Week 6 (October 17)	Michał	5	Stasiu Szeweliński	"Northern Attitude"	N/A	–	–	–	N/A
Week 6 (October 17)	Michał	5	Beninamin Nowakowski	"Northern Attitude"	N/A	–	–	–	N/A
Week 6 (October 17)	Kuba	6	Dominika Siwek	"Za szkłem"	Małgorzata Sikora	N/A	–	–	–
Week 6 (October 17)	Edyta	7	Marysia Majewska	"The Winner Takes It All"	Sandra Rusin	✔	✔	N/A	–
Week 6 (October 17)	Tomson & Baron	8	Anna Nguyen	"Dirty Diana"	N/A	–	N/A	–	–
Week 6 (October 17)	Tomson & Baron	8	Asia Mądry	"Dirty Diana"	N/A	–	N/A	–	–
Week 7 (October 31)	Kuba	1	Julia Szarek	"Do kiedy jestem"	Roksana Walczak	N/A	✔	✔	–
Week 7 (October 31)	Tomson & Baron	2	Kuba Rayman	"Decyzje"	Nikola Szkodlarska	–	N/A	–	–
Week 7 (October 31)	Michał	3	Pola Deptuła	"All Night Long (All Night)"	Ewelina Bogucka	–	✔	–	N/A
Week 7 (October 31)	Edyta	4	Kamila Kiecoń	"I Love You Always Forever"	Martyna Małek	–	–	N/A	–
Week 7 (October 31)	Kuba	5	Oliwia Panaś	"Dove (I'll Be Loving You)"	Wiktoria Smaga	–	–	N/A	–
Week 7 (October 31)	Tomson & Baron	6	N/A	"Jenny"	Ania Gromala	–	N/A	–	–
Week 7 (October 31)	Tomson & Baron	6	N/A	"Jenny"	Hania Pliszka	–	N/A	–	–
Week 7 (October 31)	Michał	7	N/A	"II Most Wanted"	Julia Matczak	–	–	–	N/A
Week 7 (October 31)	Michał	7	N/A	"II Most Wanted"	Wiktoria Zjawiony	–	–	–	N/A
Week 7 (October 31)	Edyta	8	Pamela Matyska	"Say So"	Tosia Biały	–	✔	N/A	–
Week 8 (November 7)	Tomson & Baron	1	Ula Kozielska	"Dusk Till Dawn"	Tomasz Bao	–	N/A	–	–
Week 8 (November 7)	Kuba	2	Karolina Łopuch	"Here Comes the Rain Again"	Aga Bojarska	N/A	–	–	–
Week 8 (November 7)	Edyta	3	Amelia Wróblewska	"Chciałbym umrzeć z miłości"	Aleksandra Betańska	–	–	N/A	–
Week 8 (November 7)	Michał	4	Amelia Mitoraj	"Dwa serca, dwa smutki"	Kasia Lach	–	–	–	N/A
Week 8 (November 7)	Tomson & Baron	5	Kacper Bator	"Falling Slowly"	Angela Gerłowska	–	N/A	–	–
Week 8 (November 7)	Kuba	6	Kinga Wylęgły	"Rękawiczki"	Zuzanna Łukawska	N/A	–	–	–
Week 8 (November 7)	Edyta	7	Jarosław Weber	"The Boys of Summer"	Klaudia Chyczewska	–	N/A	–	–
Week 8 (November 7)	Michał	8	Kuba Adamus	"If I Told You That"	Paulina Tarasińska	–	–	–	N/A

== The Comeback Stage ==
"The Voice Comeback Stage Powered by Orange" is a nine-episode online format, an integral part of the 17th season of The Voice of Poland. Contestants eliminated at various stages of the show, from the Blind Auditions to the Knockout, are given a second chance to showcase their vocal skills. Under the guidance of the fifth coach, Ania Karwan, they compete to return to the main competition.

During the Blind auditions, Karwan selects 10 contestants who didn't turn a chair but impressed her with their talent. In the first five episodes of "The Voice Comeback Stage Powered by Orange," two of them compete vocally, and Karwan decides who will sit in one of the three Hot Seats.

In the Battles stage, Ania selects one contestant from each of the three episodes of the main show who was eliminated in this stage. Each contestant will face a contestant in the Hot Seat. After three bouts, Karwan selects the best vocalist, who will advance directly to the semifinals.

Four contestants will advance from the Knockouts stage to "The Voice Comeback Stage Powered by Orange," one from each coach's team. Following their performances, viewers will select one person via the app to advance to the semifinals of "The Voice of Poland."

Two contestants on "The Voice Comeback Stage Powered by Orange," one chosen by Ania Karwan and the other by the viewers, will join the semifinalists of the main show and compete for victory in the 17th season of "The Voice of Poland" on equal terms.

== Knockouts ==
The Knockouts premiered on November 11, 2026. During this stage, all contestants have to sing – the first four from each team are automatically put in the hot seats, and after subsequent performances of the remaining three, the coach decides whether a given contestant stays in the show or not. In the end, four contestants from each team qualify for the Live Playoffs.

Knockouts color key
Contestant was not switched out and advanced to the Live Playoffs
Contestant was eliminated, either immediately (indicated by a "—" in the "Switched with" column) or switched with another contestant

== Live shows ==
The Live shows began on November 14, 2026. When the teams consist of four contestants, the coach chooses from among the two contestants with the fewest votes from the viewers (who decide by sending text messages) the person who drops out of the program. Each live episode ends with the elimination of one person from each group. In the semi-final (when the team is made up of two people), each coach divides 100 points to their artists in any way they want. The same happens with the viewers' votes, and the artist with the most points added passes through to the Final.

Live shows color key
Contestant was saved by public's vote
Contestant was saved by their coach
Contestant was eliminated

== Results summary of live shows ==
=== Color key ===
Artist's info

- Artist from Team Tomson & Baron
- Artist from Team Edyta
- Artist from Team Kuba
- Artist from Team Michał
- Artist from Team Ania
