= Karwan (surname) =

Karwan is a Polish surname. Archaic feminine forms are Karwanowa (by husband), Karwanówna (by father); they still can be used colloquially. Notable people with the surname include:

- Ania Karwan (born 1985), Polish singer, composer, and songwriter
- Bartosz Karwan (born 1976), Polish footballer who played as a midfielder
- Marek Karwan (born 1962), Polish entrepreneur and KS Toruń owner
- Michał Karwan (born 1979), Polish footballer who played as a defender
- Pat Karwan
