= The Voice of Poland season 16 =

2025 season of Polish television show

The Voice of Poland
- Season 16
- Promotional poster featuring coaches Szpak, Badach, Margaret, Tomson & Baron, and Karwan
- Hosted by: Paulina Chylewska; Maciej Musiał; Hi Hania
- Judges: Tomson & Baron; Margaret; Kuba Badach; Michał Szpak; Ania Karwan (Comeback Stage)
- No. of contestants: 58
- Winner: Jan Piwowarczyk
- Winning coach: Margaret
- Runner-up: Hanna Kuzimowicz

Release
- Original network: TVP 2, TVP VOD
- Original release: September 6 – November 29, 2025

Season chronology
- ← Previous; Season 15 Next → Season 17

The sixteenth season of the Polish singing competition The Voice of Poland began airing on September 6, 2025, on TVP 2. It is airing on Saturdays at 20:30. Tomson & Baron, Michał Szpak, and Kuba Badach returned to the show as coaches for their fourteenth, sixth, and second seasons, respectively. Additionally, Margaret returned to the show after a five-season hiatus for her second season, alongside Ania Karwan, who became the first Comeback Stage coach in the history of the show.

Jan Piwowarczyk won the season, marking Margaret's first and last win as a coach. Piwowarczyk's victory marks the second winning artist that had two coaches blocked in their blind audition (Michał blocking Kuba, and Margaret blocking Tomson & Baron), following Anna Iwanek in the previous season.

== Overview ==
=== Development ===
On May 5, 2025, TVP announced that The Voice of Poland was renewed for a sixteenth season to air in the fall of that year.

=== Coaches and hosts ===
Coaches and hosts of The Voice of Poland Season 16

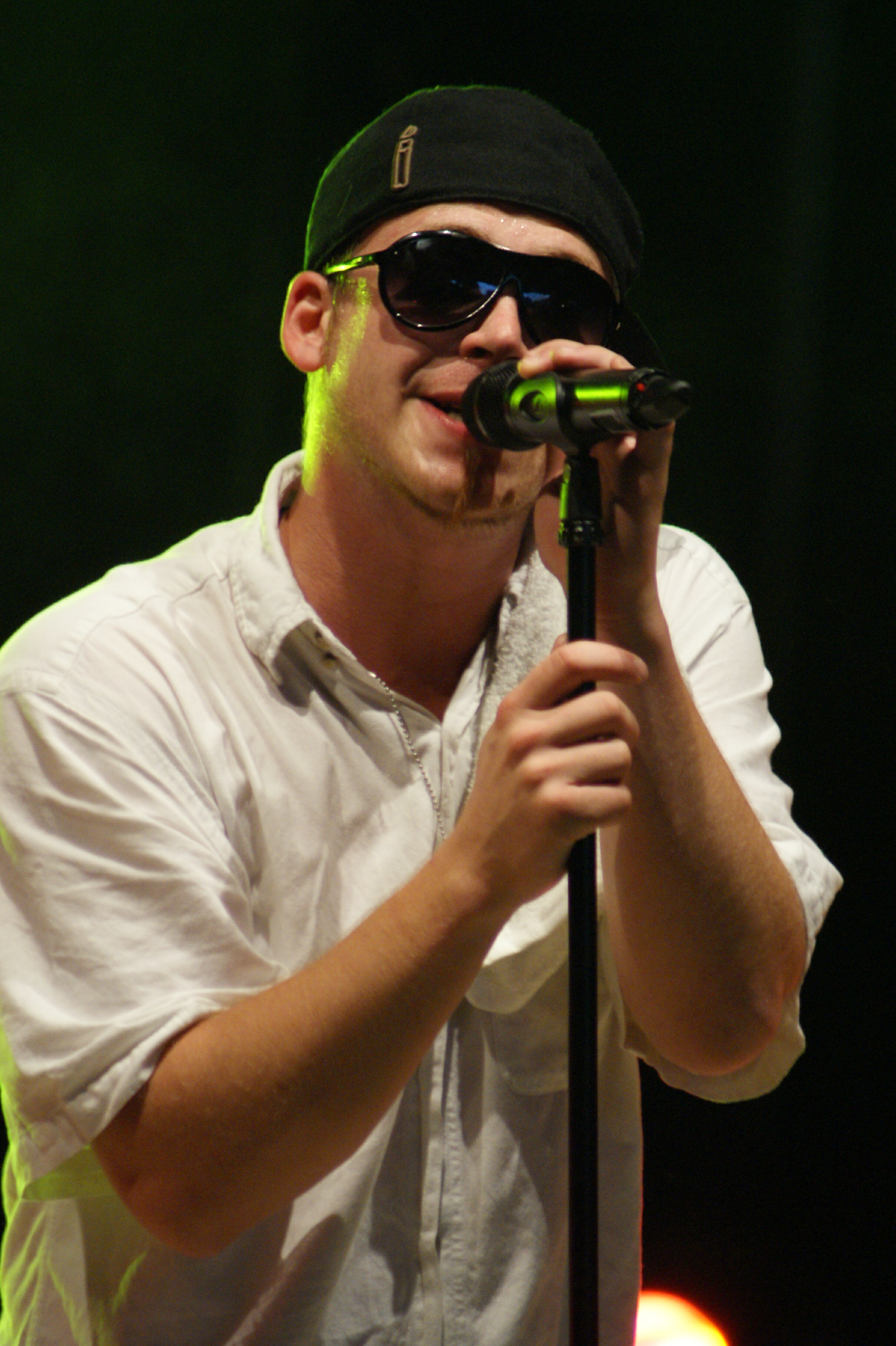
Tomson

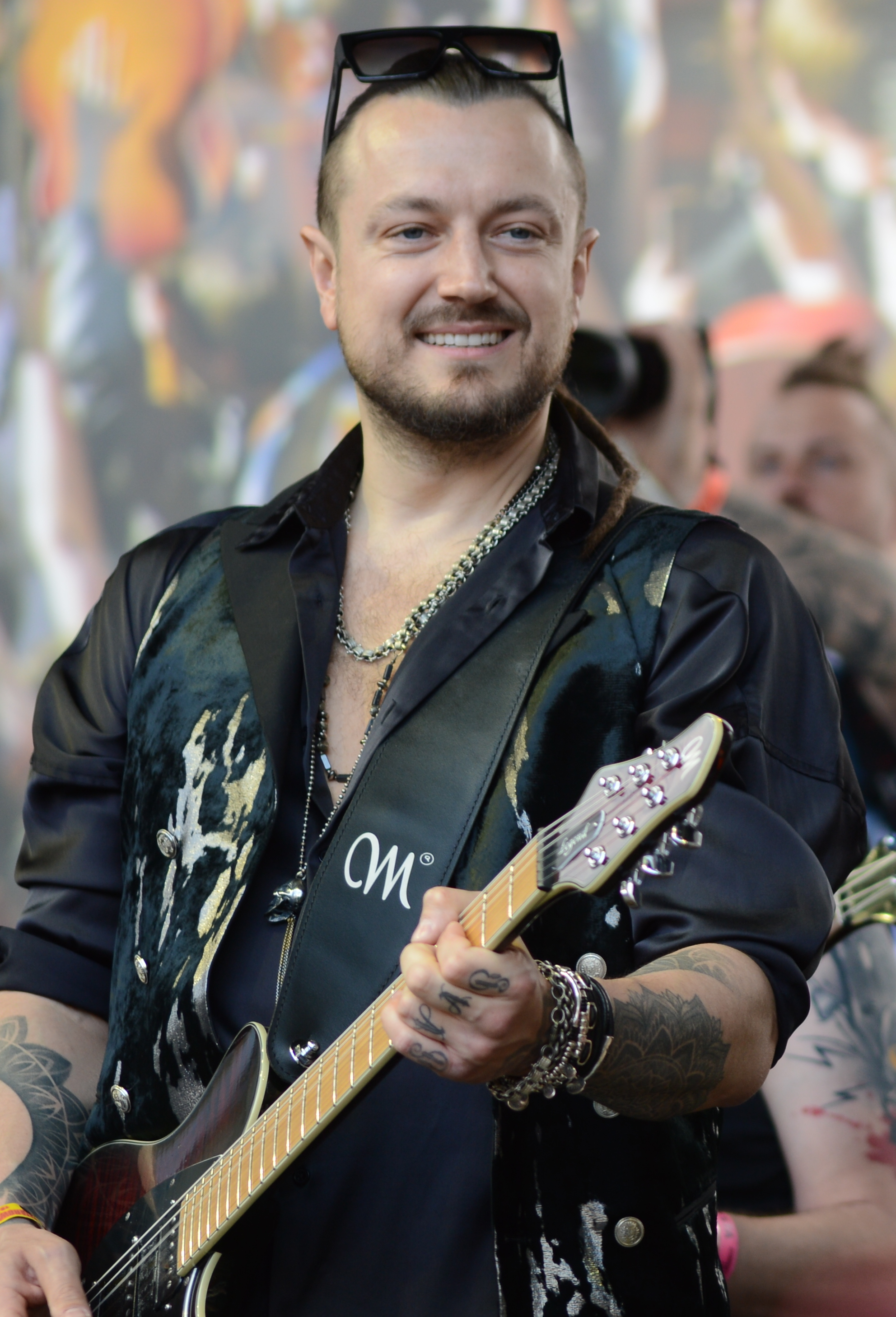
Baron

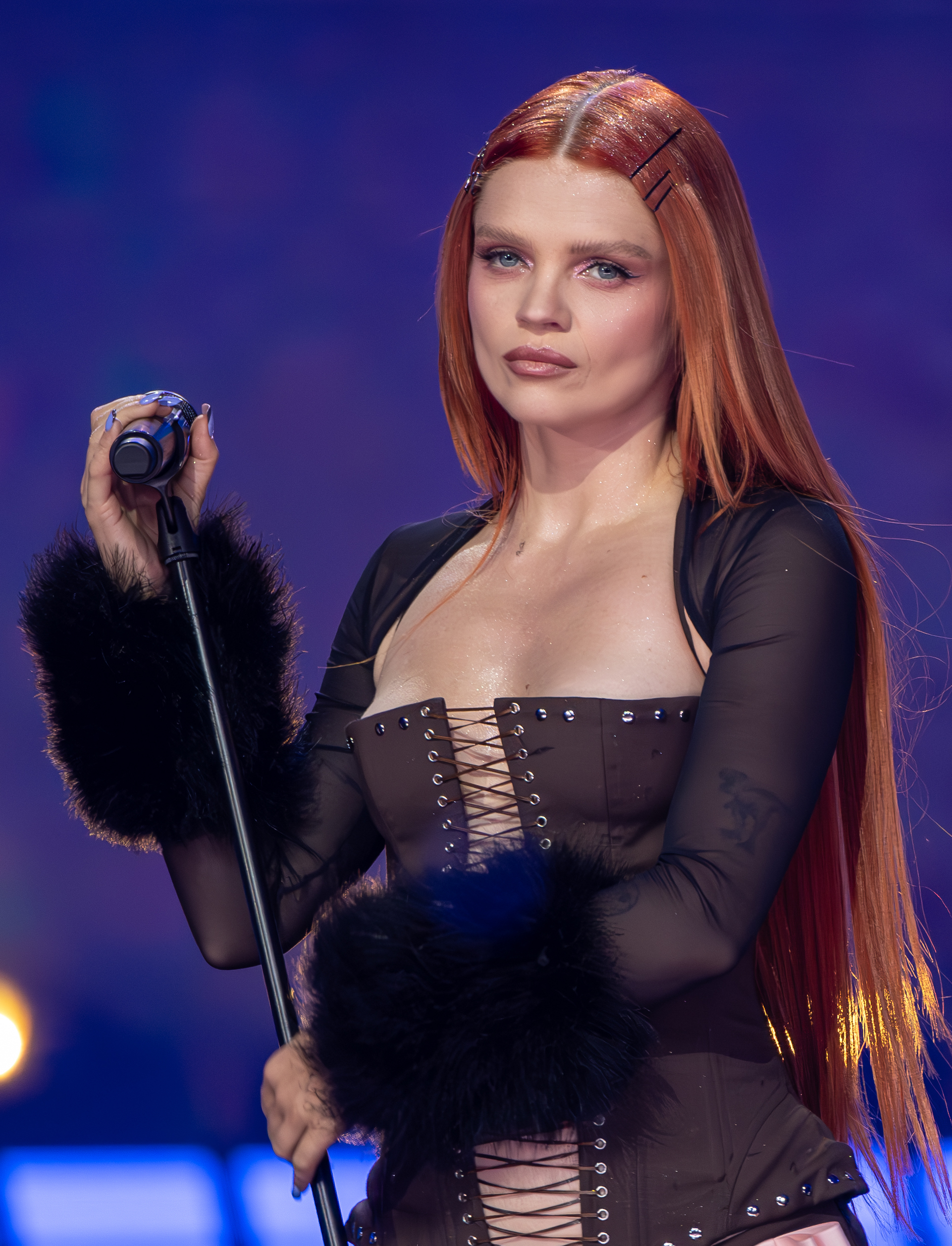
Margaret

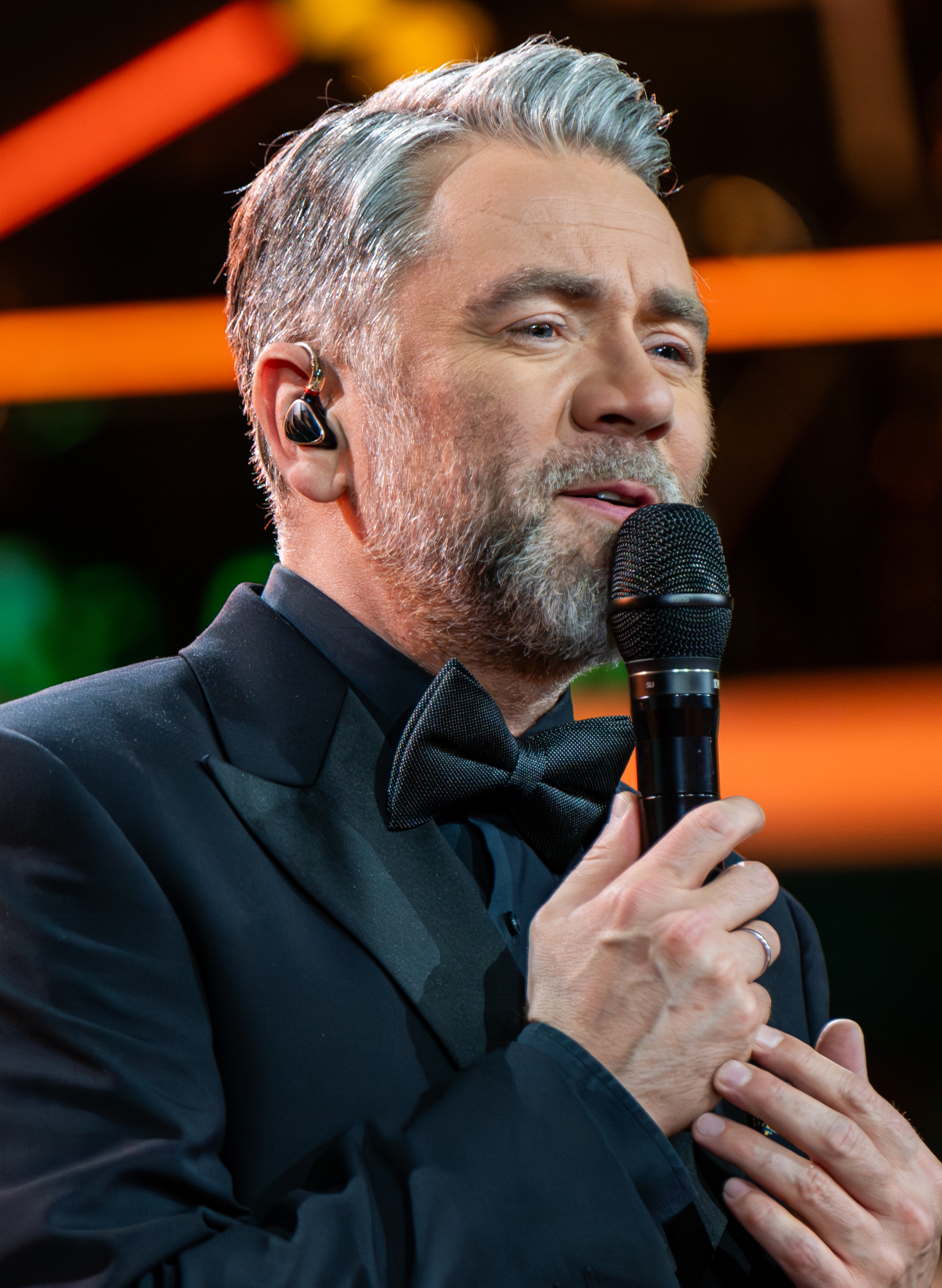
Kuba Badach

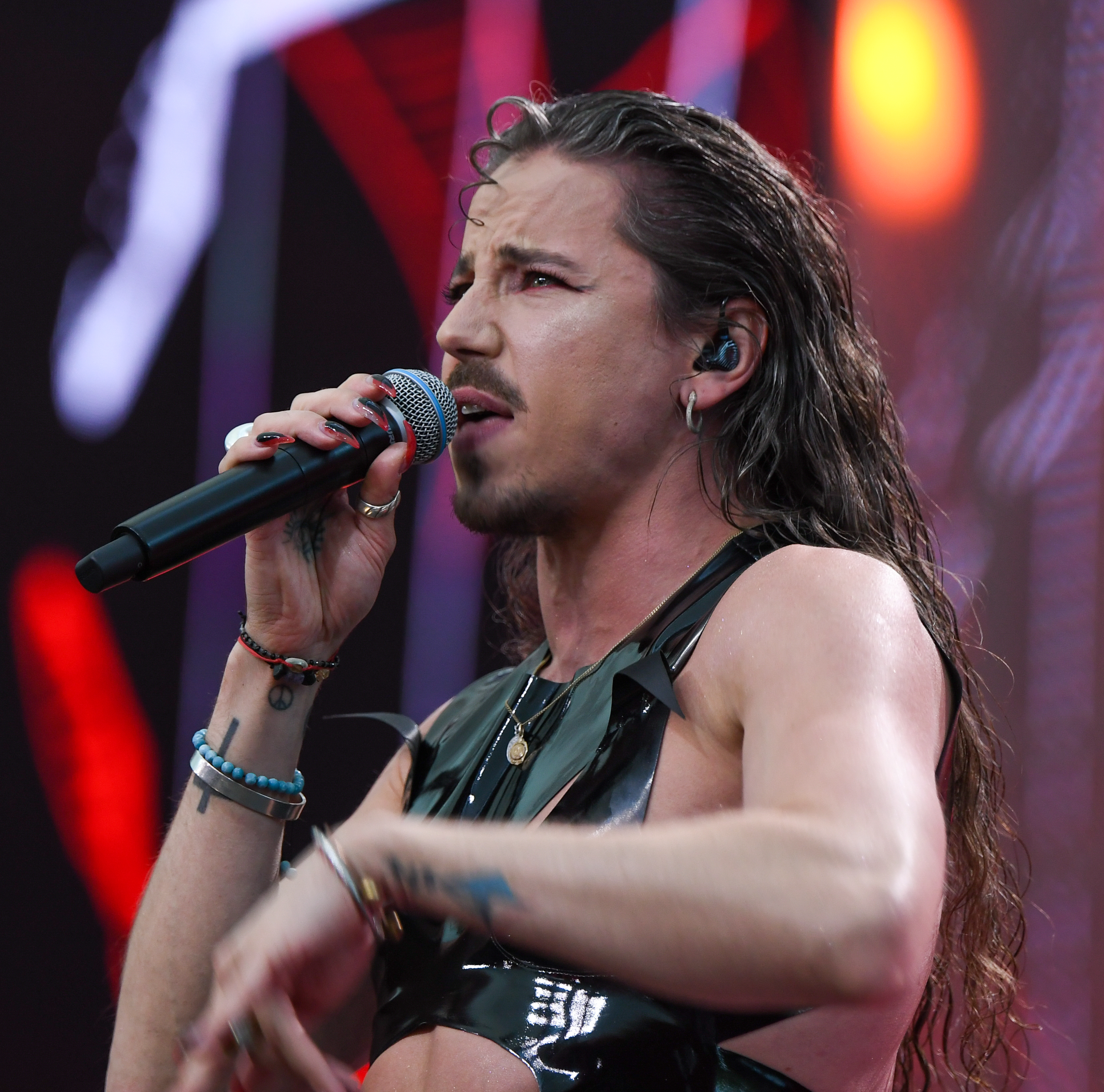
Michał Szpak

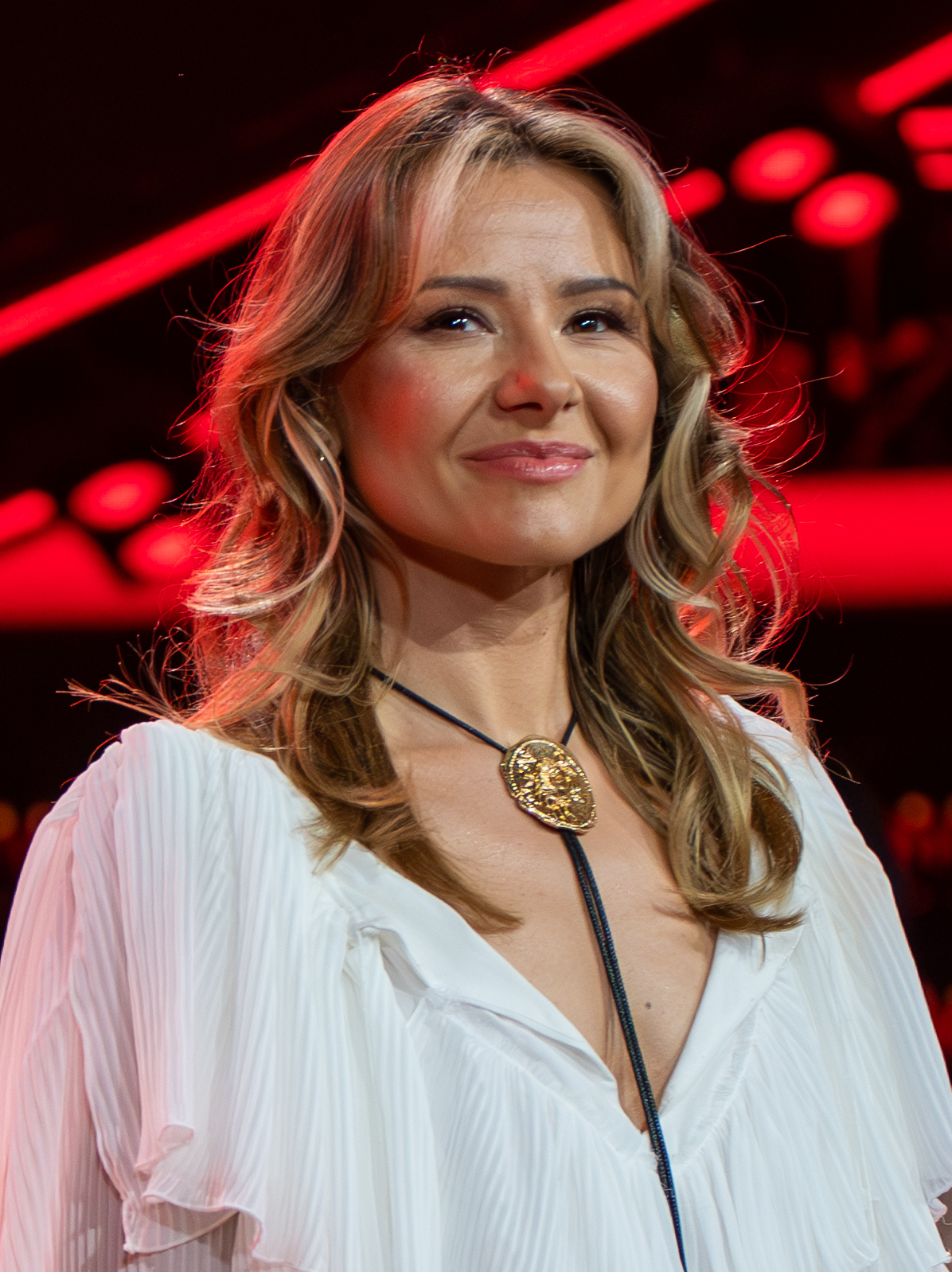
Ania Karwan

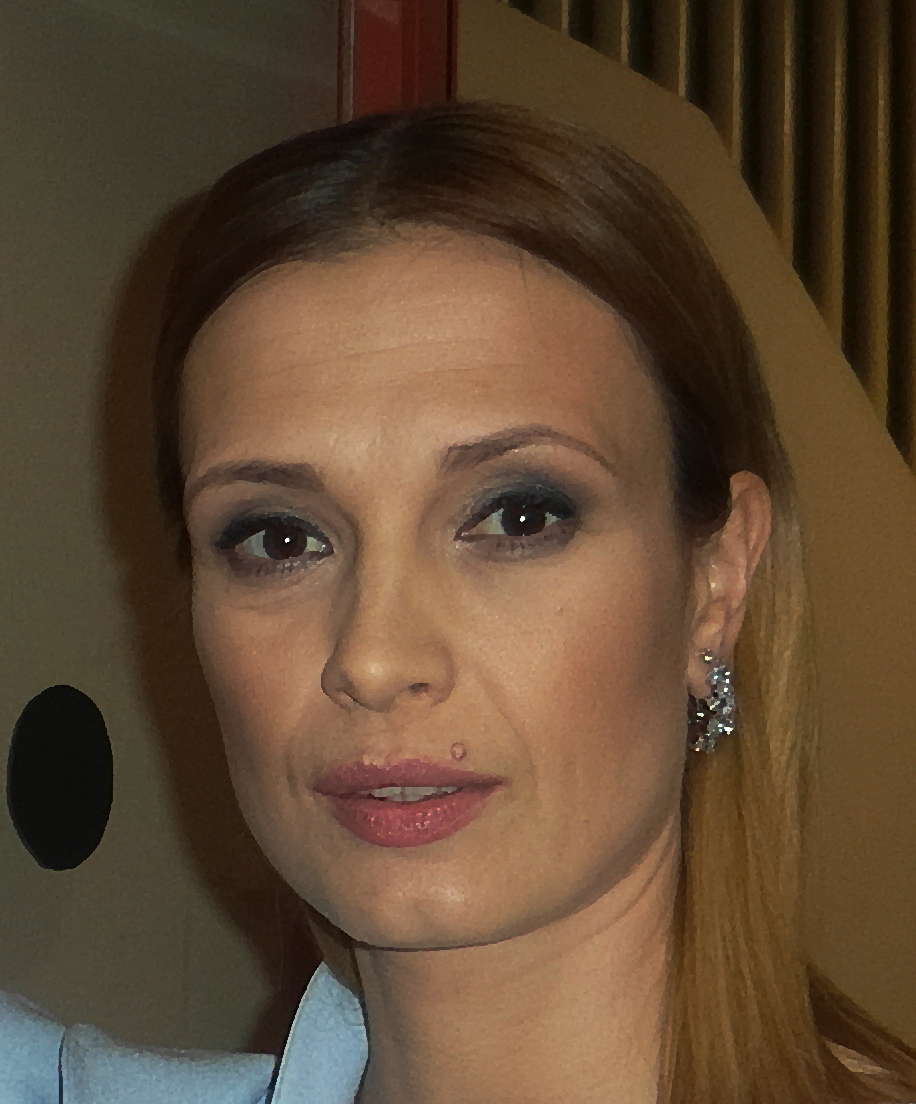
Paulina Chylewska

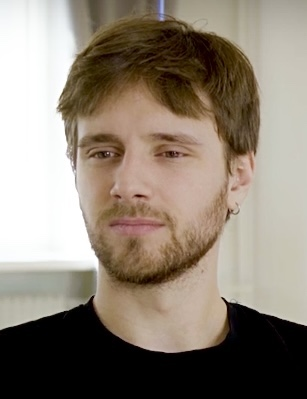
Maciej Musiał

On August 1, 2025, it was announced that Margaret, who was previously a coach in season 10, would return to the show as one of the main coaches after a five-season hiatus, replacing Lanberry, who resigned from the panel and agreed to participate in the new season of Dancing with the Stars. Taniec z gwiazdami. Also, Paulina Chylewska and Maciej Musiał return as the main hosts. On August 4, 2025, it was announced that Tomson & Baron, Michał Szpak, and Kuba Badach would return as coaches from the previous season for their fourteenth, sixth, and second seasons, respectively.

=== The Voice Comeback Stage Powered by Orange feature ===
For the first time in its history, the show is set to feature a fifth coach, who will select contestants to participate in The Voice Comeback Stage Powered by Orange. On August 5, 2025, it was announced that season 7 finalist from Team Natalia, Ania Karwan, would become a fifth coach, mentoring unsuccessful auditioners on an online version in the new round.

== Teams ==
Main Competition

- Winner
- Runner-up
- Third place
- Fourth place
- Fifth place
- Eliminated in the Semifinals
- Eliminated in the Quarterfinals
- Eliminated in the Live Playoffs
- Eliminated in the Knockout round
- Artist was stolen by another coach (Name is struck through)
- Artist was stolen but was later switched with another artist and got eliminated
- Eliminated in the Battle rounds

The Comeback Stage

- Eliminated in the Semifinals
- Eliminated of viewers voting in the app
- Eliminated in the Knockout rounds
- Eliminated in the Second Battle rounds
- Artist was stolen but was later switched with another artist and got eliminated
- Eliminated in the First Battle rounds

Coaches' teams
Coach	Top 58 Artists					
Tomson & Baron						
Tomson & Baron	Mateusz Jagiełło	Kinga Rutkowska	Marcin Spenner	Roksana Ostojska	~~Karolina Szkiłądź~~	Maciej Zieliński
Tomson & Baron	Bartosz Dereczko	~~Małgorzata Szmaglińska~~	~~Adrian Sokołowski~~	~~Ola Januszewska~~	~~Anna Janulek~~	Alicja Tarnowska
Tomson & Baron	Krzysztof Stępień					
Margaret						
Margaret	Jan Piwowarczyk	Filip Mettler	Magdalena Chołuj	Gabriela Kurzac	Lena Cichocka	~~Mateusz Włodarczyk~~
Margaret	Michał Lech	~~Małgorzata Szmaglińska~~	~~Adrian Sokołowski~~	~~Ola Januszewska~~	~~Michał Węgrzyn~~	~~Anna Kaniok~~
Margaret	~~Przemysław Piotrowski~~	~~Żaneta Saprawa~~	~~Rafał Hnatio~~	Zofia Prucnal	Natalia Mikołajec	
Kuba Badach						
Kuba Badach	Łukasz Reks	Michael Böhm	Julia Wasilewska	Zhanetta Saparava	Natalia Stępnik	Christoph Jęndrysik
Kuba Badach	~~Maria Sawicka~~	~~Karina Reske-Chojnacka~~	~~Maciej Zieliński~~	Adam Katryniok	Stanisław Łukoński	Agata Świrska
Kuba Badach	Michał Wasowicz-Piekarski					
Michał Szpak						
Michał Szpak	Hanna Kuzimowicz	Dominik Czuż	Joanna Lupa	Katarzyna Skiba	~~Anna Kędzierska~~	Anna Janulek
Michał Szpak	Dominik Rybiałek	~~Mateusz Włodarzyk~~	~~Karina Reske-Chojnacka~~	~~Michał Węgrzyn~~	Daniel Hutor	Agata Kotulska-Draus
Michał Szpak	Szymon Rybacki					
Ania Karwan						
Ania Karwan	Żaneta Chełminiak	Mateusz Włodarczyk	Karolina Szkiłądź	Anna Kędzierska	Maria Sawicka	Karol Korwek
Ania Karwan	Przemysław Piotrowski	Rafał Hnatio	Kuba Dobrzański	Anna Kaniok	Kornelia Markuszewska	Rafał Wawrzeń
Ania Karwan	Klaudia Lipińska	Lena Portasz	Weronika Pluskota	Miriam Fall	Zuzanna Firlej	
Note: Italicized names are contestants stolen from another team during the battles (names struck through within former teams).

== Blind auditions ==
The show began with the Blind Auditions on September 6, 2025. In each audition, a contestant sings their piece in front of the coaches whose chairs are facing the audience. If a coach is interested to work with the artist, they will press their button to face the artist. If a singular coach presses the button, the contestant automatically becomes part of their team. If multiple coaches turn, they will compete for the contestant, who will decide which team they will join. Each coach has two blocks to prevent another coach from getting an artist, but they can use them only after a contestant's performance. Each coach ends up with 12 artists by the end of the blind auditions, creating a total of 48 contestants advancing to the battles.

For his second consecutive season, Kuba Badach did not use either of his two blocks, while Tomson & Baron only used one block.

Blind auditions color key
✔	Coach pressed "I WANT YOU" button
	Artist joined this coach's team
	Artist selected to join this coach's team
	Artist was eliminated and was not invited back for "The Comeback Stage"
	Artist was eliminated, but got a second chance to compete in "The Comeback Stage"
✘	Coach pressed "I WANT YOU" button, but was Super Blocked by another coach from getting the artist
	Blocked by Tomson & Baron Blocked by Margaret Blocked by Kuba Blocked by Michał

=== Week 1 (September 6) ===
Week one auditions results
Order	Contestant	Age(s)	Song	Coach's and contestant's choices			
Order	Contestant	Age(s)	Song	Tomson & Baron	Margaret	Kuba	Michał
1	Marcin Spenner	40	"Tennessee Whiskey"	✔	✔	✔	✔
2	Lena Cichocka	17	"Love Me Not"	✔	✔	—	—
3	Rafał Hnatio	22	"Honesty"	✔	✔	—	✔
4	Daniel Hutor	25	"Every You Every Me"	—	—	—	✔
5	Rafał Wawrzeń	35	"Old Phone"	—	—	—	—
6	Kinga Rutkowska	28	"Golden Slumbers"	✔	—	—	✔
7	Adam Katryniok	44	"Wspomnienie"	✔	✔	✔	—
8	Zuzanna Firlej	22	"Head over Feet"	—	—	—	—
9	Adrian Sokołowski	29	"Naiwne pytania"	✔	✔	—	—
10	Klaudia Graboń	25	"Ściany"	—	—	—	—
11	Jakub Siruć	21	"Sailor Song"	—	—	—	—
12	Joanna Lupa	27	"Hold My Hand"	✔	✔	✔	✔
13	Julia Wasielewska	22	"Because of You"	✔	✔	✔	✔

=== Week 2 (September 13) ===
Week two auditions results
Order	Contestant	Age(s)	Song	Coach's and contestant's choices			
Order	Contestant	Age(s)	Song	Tomson & Baron	Margaret	Kuba	Michał
1	Przemysław Piotrowski	27	"Sorry I'm Here for Someone Else"	✔	✔	✔	—
2	Karina Reske-Chojnacka	28	"Messy"	—	—	—	✔
3	Julia Honkisz	26	"Znowu sam"	—	—	—	—
4	Mateusz Włodarczyk	33	"A Change is Gonna Come"	✔	—	—	✔
5	Żaneta Chełminiak	29	"Kiedy umrę kochanie"	—	—	—	—
6	Anna Janulek	20	"Boskie Buenos"	✔	✔	—	—
7	Michał Wasowicz-Piekarski	24	"Read All About It"	✔	✔	✔	✔
8	Roksana Ostojska	25	"Always Been You"	✔	✔	—	✔
9	Miriam Fall	32	"Birds of a Feather"	—	—	—	—
10	Michael Böhm	34	"Golden"	—	—	✔	—
11	Gabriela Kurzac	21	"Ex's & Oh's"	—	✔	—	✔
12	Krzysztof Stępień	36	"The One"	✔	—	—	✔
13	Aleksandra Andrukajtis	26	"Next Summer"	—	—	—	—
14	Jan Piwowarczyk	27	"A House Is Not a Home"	✘	✔	✘	✔

=== Week 3 (September 20) ===
Week three auditions results
Order	Contestant	Age(s)	Song	Coach's and contestant's choices			
Order	Contestant	Age(s)	Song	Tomson & Baron	Margaret	Kuba	Michał
1	Christoph Jęndrysik	23	"Bridge over Troubled Water"	✔	✔	✔	✔
2	Emilia Nichols	40	"Dancing in Love"	—	—	—	—
3	Marysia Sawicka	22	"Somewhere Only We Know"	✔	—	✔	—
4	Michał Węgrzyn	24	"Get Lucky"	—	—	—	✔
5	Zhanetta Saparava	27	"Chasing Pavements"	—	✔	—	✔
6	Weronika Pluskota	19	"Eviva l'arte"	—	—	—	—
7	Mateusz Jagiełło	26	"Otherside"	✔	✔	✔	✔
8	Bartosz Dreczko	26	"Save Your Tears"	✔	—	✔	—
9	Zofia Prucnal	34	"Where Have You Been"	—	✔	—	✔
10	Karol Korwek	34	"Chciałbym z tobą stworzyć dom"	—	—	—	—
11	Hanna Kuzimowicz	20	"Clown"	✔	✔	✘	✔
12	Dawid Rybacki	24	"Cud"	—	—	—	—
13	Szymon Rybacki	24	"Co noc"	—	—	—	✔
14	Magdalena Chołuj	28	"Beautiful People"	—	✔	✔	✔

=== Week 4 (September 27) ===
Week four auditions results
Order	Contestant	Age(s)	Song	Coach's and contestant's choices			
Order	Contestant	Age(s)	Song	Tomson & Baron	Margaret	Kuba	Michał
1	Łukasz Reks	30	"You're Still the One"	—	✔	✔	✔
2	Karolina Olzsak	30	"Zombie"	—	—	—	—
3	Natalia Mikołajec	23	"Nie mam dla ciebie miłości"	—	✔	—	✔
4	Anna Kędzierska	29	"I Follow Rivers"	—	—	✔	✔
5	Lena Portasz	22	"Po prostu bądź"	—	—	—	—
6	Filip Mettler	32	"Ordinary"	✔	✔	✔	✔
7	Anna Kaniok	21	"I Am Woman"	—	✔	✔	—
8	Janek Słowiński	29	"(Sittin' On) The Dock of the Bay"	—	—	✔	—
9	Kornelia Markuszewska	17	"Training Season"	—	—	—	—
10	Stanisław Łukoński	24	"Było miło"	✔	✔	✔	✔
11	Ola Januszewska	26	"Zanim zrozumiesz"	✔	—	✔	—
12	Krzysztof Forbot	38	"Wiatr"	—	—	—	—
13	Natalia Stępnik	18	"Kocham"	✔	—	✔	✔

=== Week 5 (October 4) ===
Week five auditions results
Order	Contestant	Age(s)	Song	Coach's and contestant's choices			
Order	Contestant	Age(s)	Song	Tomson & Baron	Margaret	Kuba	Michał
1	Katarzyna Skiba	22	"Stay"	✔	✔	—	✔
2	Dominik Rybiałek	34	"Mamma Mia"	—	—	—	✔
3	Alicja Tarnowska	20	"Inspirations"	✔	—	—	✔
4	Tomasz Majewski	23	"I Ciebie też, bardzo"	—	—	—	—
5	Agata Kotulska-Draus	33	"Songbird"	✔	—	—	✔
6	Klaudia Lipińska	34	"The Door"	—	—	—	—
7	Michał Lech	27	"Everytime"	✘	✔	✘	✔
8	Małgorzata Szmaglińska	20	"Fortnight"	✔	—	—	✔
9	Karolina Szkiłądź	22	"Come Away with Me"	✔	—	✔	—
10	Maciej Zieliński	32	"Would I Lie to You?"	—	✔	✔	✔
11	Marcelina Santiago	41	"Too Lost in You"	—	—	—	—
12	Agata Świrska	29	"Easy"	—	—	✔	—
13	Kuba Dobrzański	29	"Tam słońce, gdzie my"	—	—	—	—
14	Dominik Czuż	25	"Carry You Home"	✔	✔	✔	✔

== Battles round ==
The battles began airing on October 11, 2025 and concluded on October 25, 2025. In this round, the coaches pick two of their contestants in a singing match and then select one of them to advance to the next round. Losing contestants may be "stolen" by another coach, becoming new members of their team. Multiple coaches can attempt to steal a contestant, resulting in a competition for the contestant, who will ultimately decide which team they will go to. At the end of this round, seven contestants will remain on each team; six will be battle winners, and one from a steal. In total, 28 contestants advance to the knockouts.

Battles color key
Contestant won the Battle and advanced to the Knockouts
Contestant lost the Battle but was stolen by another coach and advanced to the Knockouts
Artist lost the Battle, but got a second chance to compete in "Comeback Stage"
Contestant lost the Battle and was stolen by another coach, but was later switched with another contestant and eliminated
Contestant lost the Battle and was eliminated

Battles results
Week	Coach	Order	Winner	Song	Loser	'Steal' result			
Week	Coach	Order	Winner	Song	Loser	Tomson & Baron	Margaret	Kuba	Michał
Week 6 (October 11)	Tomson & Baron	1	Mateusz Jagiełło	"Natural"	Anna Janulek	N/A	✔	–	✔
Week 6 (October 11)	Michał	2	Hanna Kuzimowicz	"Need You Now"	Karina Reske-Chojnacka	–	–	✔	N/A
Week 6 (October 11)	Kuba	3	Julia Wasielewska	"O niebo lepiej"	N/A	–	–	N/A	–
Week 6 (October 11)	Kuba	3	Łukasz Reks	"O niebo lepiej"	N/A	–	–	N/A	–
Week 6 (October 11)	Margaret	4	Lena Cichocka	"Anxiety"	Anna Kaniok	–	N/A	–	–
Week 6 (October 11)	Michał	5	N/A	"Napad"	Michał Węgrzyn	–	✔	–	N/A
Week 6 (October 11)	Michał	5	N/A	"Napad"	Szymon Rybacki	–	–	–	N/A
Week 6 (October 11)	Kuba	6	Michael Böhm	"Home"	Maciej Zieliński	✔	–	N/A	–
Week 6 (October 11)	Tomson & Baron	7	Karolina Szkiłądź	"O nich, o Tobie"	Ola Januszewska	N/A	✔	–	–
Week 6 (October 11)	Margaret	8	Jan Piwowarczyk	"Leave the Door Open"	N/A	–	N/A	–	–
Week 6 (October 11)	Margaret	8	Filip Mettler	"Leave the Door Open"	N/A	–	N/A	–	–
Week 7 (October 18)	Kuba	1	Christoph Jęndrysik	"Man in the Mirror"	Michał Wasowicz-Piekarski	–	–	N/A	–
Week 7 (October 18)	Michał	2	Dominik Rybiałek	"Boję się o Ciebie"	Agata Kotulska-Draus	–	–	–	N/A
Week 7 (October 18)	Margaret	3	Michał Lech	"Miliony monet"	Przemysław Piotrowski	–	N/A	–	–
Week 7 (October 18)	Tomson & Baron	4	Marcin Spenner	"Falling in Love"	N/A	N/A	–	–	–
Week 7 (October 18)	Tomson & Baron	4	Roksana Ostojska	"Falling in Love"	N/A	N/A	–	–	–
Week 7 (October 18)	Kuba	5	Marysia Sawicka	"Samoloty"	Agata Świrska	–	–	N/A	–
Week 7 (October 18)	Margaret	6	N/A	"Unwritten"	Zofia Prucnal	–	N/A	–	–
Week 7 (October 18)	Margaret	6	N/A	"Unwritten"	Natalia Mikołajec	–	N/A	–	–
Week 7 (October 18)	Michał	7	Joanna Lupa	"My Church"	N/A	–	–	–	N/A
Week 7 (October 18)	Michał	7	Dominik Czuż	"My Church"	N/A	–	–	–	N/A
Week 7 (October 18)	Tomson & Baron	8	N/A	"What Do You Believe In?"	Adrian Sokołowski	N/A	✔	–	–
Week 7 (October 18)	Tomson & Baron	8	N/A	"What Do You Believe In?"	Krzysztof Stępień	N/A	–	–	–
Week 8 (October 25)	Margaret	1	Magdalena Chołuj	"Sisters Are Doin' It for Themselves"	Zhanetta Saparava	–	N/A	✔	✔
Week 8 (October 25)	Kuba	2	N/A	"Zabiorę cię, Magdaleno"	Stanisław Łukoński	–	–	N/A	–
Week 8 (October 25)	Kuba	2	N/A	"Zabiorę cię, Magdaleno"	Adam Katryniok	–	–	N/A	–
Week 8 (October 25)	Michał	3	Anna Kędzierska	"Just Give Me a Reason"	Daniel Hutor	–	–	–	N/A
Week 8 (October 25)	Tomson & Baron	4	Kinga Rutkowska	"Love in the Dark"	Małgorzata Szmaglińska	N/A	✔	–	–
Week 8 (October 25)	Michał	5	Katarzyna Skiba	"Cold"	Mateusz Włodarczyk	–	✔	✔	N/A
Week 8 (October 25)	Kuba	6	Natalia Stępnik	"Have You Ever Seen the Rain"	Janek Słowiński	–	–	N/A	–
Week 8 (October 25)	Margaret	7	Gabriela Kurzac	"Wynalazek Filipa Golarza"	Rafał Hnatio	–	N/A	–	–
Week 8 (October 25)	Tomson & Baron	8	Bartosz Dereczko	"Nie mówię tak, nie mówię nie"	Alicja Tarnowska	N/A	–	–	–

== The Comeback Stage ==
"The Voice Comeback Stage Powered by Orange" is a nine-episode online format, an integral part of the 16th season of The Voice of Poland. Contestants eliminated at various stages of the show, from the Blind Auditions to the Knockout, are given a second chance to showcase their vocal skills. Under the guidance of the fifth coach, Ania Karwan, they compete to return to the main competition.

During the Blind auditions, Karwan selects 10 contestants who didn't turn a chair but impressed her with their talent. In the first five episodes of "The Voice Comeback Stage Powered by Orange," two of them compete vocally, and Karwan decides who will sit in one of the three Hot Seats.

In the Battles stage, Ania selects one contestant from each of the three episodes of the main show who was eliminated in this stage. Each contestant will face a contestant in the Hot Seat. After three bouts, Karwan selects the best vocalist, who will advance directly to the semifinals.

Four contestants will advance from the Knockouts stage to "The Voice Comeback Stage Powered by Orange," one from each coach's team. Following their performances, viewers will select one person via the app to advance to the semifinals of "The Voice of Poland."

Two contestants on "The Voice Comeback Stage Powered by Orange," one chosen by Ania Karwan and the other by the viewers, will join the semifinalists of the main show and compete for victory in the 16th season of "The Voice of Poland" on equal terms.

=== The Battles ===
Artist won the battle and advanced to the next round
Artist originally won the battle, but was later switched with another artist and was eliminated
Artist lost the battle and was eliminated

==== First Round (from blind audition) ====
Episode (Digital)	Coach	Song	Artists		Song
Episode (Digital)	Coach	Song	Winner	Loser	Song
Episode 1 (Sunday, Sep. 07, 2025)	Ania Karwan	"Małomiasteczkowy"	Rafał Wawrzeń	Zuzanna Firlej	"Złota Sukienka"
Episode 2 (Sunday, Sep. 14, 2025)	Ania Karwan	"Powinnam?"	Żaneta Chełminiak	Miriam Fall	"Smooth Operator"
Episode 3 (Sunday, Sep. 21, 2025)	Ania Karwan	"Szukam"	Karol Korwek	Weronika Pluskota	"Feel It Still"
Episode 4 (Sunday, Sep. 28, 2025)	Ania Karwan	"Espresso"	Kornelia Markuszewska	Lena Portasz	"Diament"
Episode 5 (Sunday, Oct. 05, 2025)	Ania Karwan	"Bad Dreams"	Kuba Dobrzański	Klaudia Lipińska	"Miałeś Być"

=== Second round (Battles) ===
Episode (Digital)	Coach	Song	Artists	
Episode (Digital)	Coach	Song	Winner	Loser
Episode 6 (Sunday, Oct. 12, 2025)	Ania Karwan	"Don't Start Now"	Żaneta Chełminiak	Anna Kaniok
Episode 7 (Sunday, Oct. 19, 2025)	Ania Karwan	"Proste"	Przemysław Piotrowski	Kuba Dobrzański
Episode 8 (Sunday, Oct. 26, 2025)	Ania Karwan	"Dla Ciebie"	Karol Korwek	Rafał Hnatio

=== Knockouts ===
Color key

The participant returns to the program saved by the audience's vote through the app.
Participant eliminated from the program by viewers on the app.

"Second Chance" knockouts results
Episode	Coach	Order	Artist	Song	Viewers voice through the app
Episode 9 (Sunday, Nov. 02, 2025)	Ania Karwan	1	Karolina Szkiłądź	"Jolene"	
Episode 9 (Sunday, Nov. 02, 2025)	Ania Karwan	2	Anna Kędzierska	"A to co mam"	
Episode 9 (Sunday, Nov. 02, 2025)	Ania Karwan	3	Maria Sawicka	"Słowa na K"	
Episode 9 (Sunday, Nov. 02, 2025)	Ania Karwan	4	Mateusz Włodarczyk	"Nie proszę o więcej"	

== Knockouts ==
The Knockouts premiered on November 1, 2025. During this stage, all contestants have to sing – the first four from each team are automatically put in the hot seats, and after subsequent performances of the remaining three, the coach decides whether a given contestant stays in the show or not. In the end, four contestants from each team qualify for the Live Playoffs.

Knockouts color key
Contestant was not switched out and advanced to the Live Playoffs
Contestant was eliminated, either immediately (indicated by a "—" in the "Switched with" column) or switched with another contestant

Knockouts results
Episode & Date	Coach	Order	Contestant	Song	Result	Switched with
Episode 17 (Saturday, Nov. 01, 2025)	Tomson & Baron	1	Roksana Ostojska	"Gossip"	Advanced	N/A
Episode 17 (Saturday, Nov. 01, 2025)	Tomson & Baron	2	Bartosz Dreczko	"Luźno"	Eliminated	N/A
Episode 17 (Saturday, Nov. 01, 2025)	Tomson & Baron	3	Kinga Rutkowska	"Tattoo"	Advanced	N/A
Episode 17 (Saturday, Nov. 01, 2025)	Tomson & Baron	4	Maciej Zieliński	"Kosmiczne energie"	Eliminated	N/A
Episode 17 (Saturday, Nov. 01, 2025)	Tomson & Baron	5	Mateusz Jagiełło	"All Summer Long"	Advanced	Bartosz Dreczko
Episode 17 (Saturday, Nov. 01, 2025)	Tomson & Baron	6	Karolina Szkiłądź	"Dłoń"	Eliminated	Maciej Zieliński
Episode 17 (Saturday, Nov. 01, 2025)	Tomson & Baron	7	Marcin Spenner	"Behind Blue Eyes"	Advanced	Karolina Szkiłądź
Episode 17 (Saturday, Nov. 01, 2025)	Michał	1	Anna Kędzierska	"Chained to the Rhythm"	Eliminated	N/A
Episode 17 (Saturday, Nov. 01, 2025)	Michał	2	Dominik Rybiałek	"Tolerancja"	Eliminated	N/A
Episode 17 (Saturday, Nov. 01, 2025)	Michał	3	Dominik Czuż	"Wicked Game"	Advanced	N/A
Episode 17 (Saturday, Nov. 01, 2025)	Michał	4	Hanna Kuzimowicz	"Angel"	Advanced	N/A
Episode 17 (Saturday, Nov. 01, 2025)	Michał	5	Joanna Lupa	"Dziesięć przykazań"	Advanced	Dominik Rybiałek
Episode 17 (Saturday, Nov. 01, 2025)	Michał	6	Anna Janulek	"Jestem kobietą"	Eliminated	N/A
Episode 17 (Saturday, Nov. 01, 2025)	Michał	7	Katarzyna Skiba	"Lifted"	Advanced	Anna Kędzierska

Knockouts results
Episode & Date	Coach	Order	Contestant	Song	Result	Switched with
Episode 18 (Saturday, Nov. 01, 2025)	Margaret	1	Jan Piwowarczyk	"Glimpse of Us"	Advanced	N/A
Episode 18 (Saturday, Nov. 01, 2025)	Margaret	2	Magdalena Chołuj	"Hot Right Now"	Advanced	N/A
Episode 18 (Saturday, Nov. 01, 2025)	Margaret	3	Michał Lech	"Treasure"	Eliminated	N/A
Episode 18 (Saturday, Nov. 01, 2025)	Margaret	4	Gabriela Kurzac	"Street Life"	Advanced	N/A
Episode 18 (Saturday, Nov. 01, 2025)	Margaret	5	Filip Mettler	"Jeszcze w zielone gramy"	Advanced	Michał Lech
Episode 18 (Saturday, Nov. 01, 2025)	Margaret	6	Mateusz Włodarczyk	"Lay me Down"	Eliminated	N/A
Episode 18 (Saturday, Nov. 01, 2025)	Margaret	7	Lena Cichocka	"Kiedyś do Ciebie wrócę"	Eliminated	N/A
Episode 18 (Saturday, Nov. 01, 2025)	Kuba	1	Christoph Jęndrysik	"mori"	Eliminated	N/A
Episode 18 (Saturday, Nov. 01, 2025)	Kuba	2	Julia Wasielewska	"Mamma Knows Best"	Advanced	N/A
Episode 18 (Saturday, Nov. 01, 2025)	Kuba	3	Łukasz Reks	"Aura"	Advanced	N/A
Episode 18 (Saturday, Nov. 01, 2025)	Kuba	4	Marysia Sawecka	"Dziś już wiem"	Eliminated	N/A
Episode 18 (Saturday, Nov. 01, 2025)	Kuba	5	Natalia Stępnik	"A Woman's Worth"	Eliminated	Marysia Sawecka
Episode 18 (Saturday, Nov. 01, 2025)	Kuba	6	Michael Böhm	"Bruises"	Advanced	Christoph Jęndrysik
Episode 18 (Saturday, Nov. 01, 2025)	Kuba	7	Zhanetta Saparava	"Addicted to You"	Advanced	Natalia Stępnik

== Live shows ==
The Live shows began on November 8, 2025. When the teams consist of four contestants, the coach chooses from among the two contestants with the fewest votes from the viewers (who decide by sending text messages) the person who drops out of the program. Each live episode ends with the elimination of one person from each group. In the semi-final (when the team is made up of two people), each coach divides 100 points to their artists in any way they want. The same happens with the viewers' votes, and the artist with the most points added passes through to the Final.

Live shows color key
Contestant was saved by public's vote
Contestant was saved by their coach
Contestant was eliminated

=== Week 1: Live Playoffs – Top 16 Performances (November 8) ===
Live Playoffs results
Episode & Date	Coach	Order	Contestant	Song	Result
Episode 19 (Saturday, Nov. 08, 2025)	Tomson & Baron	1	Roksana Ostojska	"Bang Bang"	Eliminated
Episode 19 (Saturday, Nov. 08, 2025)	Tomson & Baron	2	Kinga Rutkowska	"Odkryjemy Miłość Nieznaną"	Public's vote
Episode 19 (Saturday, Nov. 08, 2025)	Tomson & Baron	3	Mateusz Jagiełło	"Paradise City"	Public's vote
Episode 19 (Saturday, Nov. 08, 2025)	Tomson & Baron	4	Marcin Spenner	"Piosenka księżycowa"	Tomson & Baron's choice
Episode 19 (Saturday, Nov. 08, 2025)	Kuba Badach	1	Michael Böhm	"Broken Strings"	Public's vote
Episode 19 (Saturday, Nov. 08, 2025)	Kuba Badach	2	Julia Wasielewska	"Sen na pogodne dni"	Public's vote
Episode 19 (Saturday, Nov. 08, 2025)	Kuba Badach	3	Zhanetta Saparava	"Melodia"	Eliminated
Episode 19 (Saturday, Nov. 08, 2025)	Kuba Badach	4	Łukasz Reks	"Waiting on the World to Change"	Kuba's choice
Episode 20 (Saturday, Nov. 08, 2025)	Michał Szpak	1	Hanna Kuzimowicz	"Running Up That Hill"	Public's vote
Episode 20 (Saturday, Nov. 08, 2025)	Michał Szpak	2	Joanna Lupa	"Raz-dwa, Raz-dwa"	Public's vote
Episode 20 (Saturday, Nov. 08, 2025)	Michał Szpak	3	Dominik Czuż	"Hej Wy"	Michał's choice
Episode 20 (Saturday, Nov. 08, 2025)	Michał Szpak	4	Katarzyna Skiba	"Dream On"	Eliminated
Episode 20 (Saturday, Nov. 08, 2025)	Margaret	1	Gabriela Kurzac	"I Kissed a Girl"	Eliminated
Episode 20 (Saturday, Nov. 08, 2025)	Margaret	2	Magdalena Chołuj	"Na Kolana"	Margaret's choice
Episode 20 (Saturday, Nov. 08, 2025)	Margaret	3	Filip Mettler	"In My Blood"	Public's vote
Episode 20 (Saturday, Nov. 08, 2025)	Margaret	4	Jan Piwowarczyk	"Imię Deszczu"	Public's vote

Non-competition performances
Order	Performer	Song
19.1	Oskar Cyms	"Cały Czas"
19.2	Davina Michelle	"What A Woman"
20.1	Oskar Cyms	"Zabierz Mnie"

=== Week 2: The Quarterfinals – Top 12 Performances (November 15) ===
Live Playoffs results
Episode & Date	Coach	Order	Contestant	Song	Result
Episode 21 (Saturday, Nov. 15, 2025)	Michał Szpak	1	Hanna Kuzimowicz	"Jaka Róża Taki Cierń"	Michał's choice
Episode 21 (Saturday, Nov. 15, 2025)	Michał Szpak	2	Dominik Czuż	"Too Sweet"	Public's vote
Episode 21 (Saturday, Nov. 15, 2025)	Michał Szpak	3	Joanna Lupa	"Good Luck"	Eliminated
Episode 21 (Saturday, Nov. 15, 2025)	Margaret	1	Filip Mettler	"Kiedy powiem sobie dość"	Margaret's choice
Episode 21 (Saturday, Nov. 15, 2025)	Margaret	2	Magdalena Chołuj	"Where Is My Husband!"	Eliminated
Episode 21 (Saturday, Nov. 15, 2025)	Margaret	3	Jan Piwowarczyk	"Beautiful Things"	Public's vote
Episode 22 (Saturday, Nov. 15, 2025)	Kuba Badach	1	Julia Wasielewska	"Love On Top"	Eliminated
Episode 22 (Saturday, Nov. 15, 2025)	Kuba Badach	2	Michael Böhm	"Trudno mi się przyznać"	Public's vote
Episode 22 (Saturday, Nov. 15, 2025)	Kuba Badach	3	Łukasz Reks	"Wszystko będzie dobrze"	Kuba's choice
Episode 22 (Saturday, Nov. 15, 2025)	Tomson & Baron	1	Mateusz Jagiełło	"Idź Precz!"	Tomson & Baron's choice
Episode 22 (Saturday, Nov. 15, 2025)	Tomson & Baron	2	Kinga Rutkowska	"Wrecking Ball"	Public's vote
Episode 22 (Saturday, Nov. 15, 2025)	Tomson & Baron	3	Marcin Spenner	"Stand by My Woman"	Eliminated

Non-competition performances
Order	Performer	Song
21.1	Błażej Król	"Wszystko"
22.1	Żaneta Chełminiak & Mateusz Włodarczyk	"Beneath Your Beautiful"
22.2	Sara James	"M.I.A."

=== Week 3: Semi-finals (November 22) ===
In the semi-finals (when the team is made up of two contestants), each coach divides 100 points between their contestants and then everyone is credited with as many points as the percentage of votes they get from the viewers.

Semi-final results
Episode & Date	Coach	Order	Contestant	Cover song	Original song	Points			Result
Episode & Date	Coach	Order	Contestant	Cover song	Original song	Coach	Public	Total	Result
Episode 23 (Saturday, November 22, 2025)	Kuba Badach	1	Michael Böhm	"Czas nas uczy pogody"	"Dałem słowo"	40	46	86	Eliminated
Episode 23 (Saturday, November 22, 2025)	Kuba Badach	2	Łukasz Reks	"Just the Way You Are"	"Nigdy nie będzie piękniej"	60	54	114	Advanced
Episode 23 (Saturday, November 22, 2025)	Tomson & Baron	1	Kinga Rutkowska	"Powerful"	"Lepszy Czas"	40	25	65	Eliminated
Episode 23 (Saturday, November 22, 2025)	Tomson & Baron	2	Mateusz Jagiełło	"Angels"	"Dansing"	60	75	135	Advanced
Episode 24 (Saturday, November 22, 2025)	Ania Karwan	1	Mateusz Włodarczyk	"Right Here Waiting"	"Puste Kartki"	49	34	83	Eliminated
Episode 24 (Saturday, November 22, 2025)	Ania Karwan	2	Żaneta Chełminiak	"Can't Get You Out of My Head"	"Daj mi odjeść"	51	66	117	Advanced
Episode 24 (Saturday, November 22, 2025)	Margaret	1	Filip Mettler	"Stay"	"W Ciemności"	40	30	70	Eliminated
Episode 24 (Saturday, November 22, 2025)	Margaret	2	Jan Piwowarczyk	"Saving All My Love for You"	"Ushuaia"	60	70	130	Advanced
Episode 24 (Saturday, November 22, 2025)	Michał Szpak	1	Hanna Kuzimowicz	"California Dreamin"	"Trzy razy bardziej"	49	55	104	Advanced
Episode 24 (Saturday, November 22, 2025)	Michał Szpak	2	Dominik Czuż	"Jealous"	"Tak bardzo mi przykro"	51	45	96	Eliminated

Non-competition performances
Order	Performer	Song
23.1	Pszona	"Zły"
24.1	Ania Karwan	"W to mi graj"
24.2	Dawid Kwiatkowski	"Dalej, Dalej!"

=== Week 4: The Finale (November 29) ===
During the grand finale, five contestants (one from each team) compete during three rounds. In the first round, the finalists sing a foreign language song followed by a duet with their coach; in the second round, the repertoire consists of Polish songs; in the third round, the remaining two contestants sing their own songs. The winner is chosen by viewers in the public's voting. Voting is divided into three rounds; after each round, the contestant with the fewest number of votes is eliminated.

Final results
Episode & Date	Coach	Order	Contestant	Song		Result
Episodes 25 & 26 (Saturday, November 29, 2025)	Tomson & Baron	1	Mateusz Jagiełło	Duet with coach	"Whole Lotta Love"	Third place
Episodes 25 & 26 (Saturday, November 29, 2025)	Tomson & Baron	1	Mateusz Jagiełło	English song	"Cryin'"	Third place
Episodes 25 & 26 (Saturday, November 29, 2025)	Tomson & Baron	1	Mateusz Jagiełło	Polish song	"Nadzieja"	Third place
Episodes 25 & 26 (Saturday, November 29, 2025)	Tomson & Baron	1	Mateusz Jagiełło	Original song	—N/a	Third place
Episodes 25 & 26 (Saturday, November 29, 2025)	Kuba Badach	2	Łukasz Reks	Duet with coach	"I Wish"	Fourth place
Episodes 25 & 26 (Saturday, November 29, 2025)	Kuba Badach	2	Łukasz Reks	English song	"When I Need You"	Fourth place
Episodes 25 & 26 (Saturday, November 29, 2025)	Kuba Badach	2	Łukasz Reks	Polish song	"Im więcej Ciebie tym mniej"	Fourth place
Episodes 25 & 26 (Saturday, November 29, 2025)	Kuba Badach	2	Łukasz Reks	Original song	—N/a	Fourth place
Episodes 25 & 26 (Saturday, November 29, 2025)	Michał Szpak	3	Hanna Kuzimowicz	Duet with coach	"E più ti penso"	Runner-up
Episodes 25 & 26 (Saturday, November 29, 2025)	Michał Szpak	3	Hanna Kuzimowicz	English song	"Nothing Compares 2 U"	Runner-up
Episodes 25 & 26 (Saturday, November 29, 2025)	Michał Szpak	3	Hanna Kuzimowicz	Polish song	"To nie ja!"	Runner-up
Episodes 25 & 26 (Saturday, November 29, 2025)	Michał Szpak	3	Hanna Kuzimowicz	Original song	"Trzy razy bardziej"	Runner-up
Episodes 25 & 26 (Saturday, November 29, 2025)	Margaret	4	Jan Piwowarczyk	Duet with coach	"Kochana"	Winner
Episodes 25 & 26 (Saturday, November 29, 2025)	Margaret	4	Jan Piwowarczyk	English song	"Bohemian Rhapsody"	Winner
Episodes 25 & 26 (Saturday, November 29, 2025)	Margaret	4	Jan Piwowarczyk	Polish song	"Szklanka wody"	Winner
Episodes 25 & 26 (Saturday, November 29, 2025)	Margaret	4	Jan Piwowarczyk	Original song	"Ushuaia"	Winner
Episodes 25 & 26 (Saturday, November 29, 2025)	Ania Karwan	5	Żaneta Chełminiak	Duet with coach	"I Wanna Dance with Somebody"	Fifth place
Episodes 25 & 26 (Saturday, November 29, 2025)	Ania Karwan	5	Żaneta Chełminiak	English song	"Sing It Back"	Fifth place
Episodes 25 & 26 (Saturday, November 29, 2025)	Ania Karwan	5	Żaneta Chełminiak	Polish song	—N/a	Fifth place
Episodes 25 & 26 (Saturday, November 29, 2025)	Ania Karwan	5	Żaneta Chełminiak	Original song	—N/a	Fifth place

Non-competition performances
Order	Performer	Song
25.1	Zaz	"Je veux"
26.1	Nemo	"Hocus Pocus"
26.2	Marianna Kłos	"Brightest Light"
26.3	Ralph Kaminski	"Nie bój się na zapas!"
26.4	Anna Iwanek	"Jutro"
26.5	Zaz	"On peut comme ça"

== Results summary of live shows ==
=== Color key ===
Artist's info

- Artist from Team Tomson & Baron
- Artist from Team Margaret
- Artist from Team Kuba
- Artist from Team Michał
- Artist from Team Ania

Result details

- Winner
- Runner-up
- Third place
- Fourth place
- Fifth place
- Saved by their coach
- Saved by the public
- Advanced to the Finale with the most points
- Eliminated

Live shows results per week
Contestant	Week 1	Week 2	Week 3	Final
Jan Piwowarczyk	Safe	Safe	Advanced	Winner
Hanna Kuzimowicz	Safe	Safe	Advanced	Runner-up
Mateusz Jagiełło	Safe	Safe	Advanced	Third place
Łukasz Reks	Safe	Safe	Advanced	Fourth place
Żaneta Chełminiak	No Performance		Advanced	Fifth place
Dominik Czuż	Safe	Safe	Eliminated	Eliminated (Week 3)
Filip Mettler	Safe	Safe	Eliminated	Eliminated (Week 3)
Mateusz Włodarczyk	No Performance		Eliminated	Eliminated (Week 3)
Kinga Rutkowska	Safe	Safe	Eliminated	Eliminated (Week 3)
Michael Böhm	Safe	Safe	Eliminated	Eliminated (Week 3)
Marcin Spenner	Safe	Eliminated	Eliminated (Week 2)	
Julia Wasielewska	Safe	Eliminated	Eliminated (Week 2)	
Magdalena Chołuj	Safe	Eliminated	Eliminated (Week 2)	
Joanna Lupa	Safe	Eliminated	Eliminated (Week 2)	
Gabriela Kurzac	Eliminated	Eliminated (Week 1)		
Katarzyna Skiba	Eliminated	Eliminated (Week 1)		
Zhanetta Saparava	Eliminated	Eliminated (Week 1)		
Roksana Ostojska	Eliminated	Eliminated (Week 1)		
