= Michał Karwan =

Polish footballer

Personal information
- Full name: Michał Karwan
- Date of birth: 7 February 1979 (age 47)
- Place of birth: Gliwice, Poland
- Height: 1.93 m (6 ft 4 in)
- Position: Defender

Senior career*
Years	Team	Apps	(Gls)
1996–1997	Tomasovia Tomaszów		
1997–1999	GKS Katowice	0	(0)
1999–2002	Rozwój Katowice		
2002–2003	Świt Nowy Dwór	14	(0)
2003–2005	Górnik Zabrze	47	(1)
2005–2009	Cracovia	58	(0)
2009–2010	Górnik Zabrze	17	(0)
2010–2011	Górnik Zabrze II		
- * Club domestic league appearances and goals

Michał Karwan (born 7 February 1979) is a Polish former professional footballer who played as a defender.

== Career ==
In May 2011, Karwan's contract with Górnik Zabrze was terminated.
