= Ania Karwan =

Polish singer

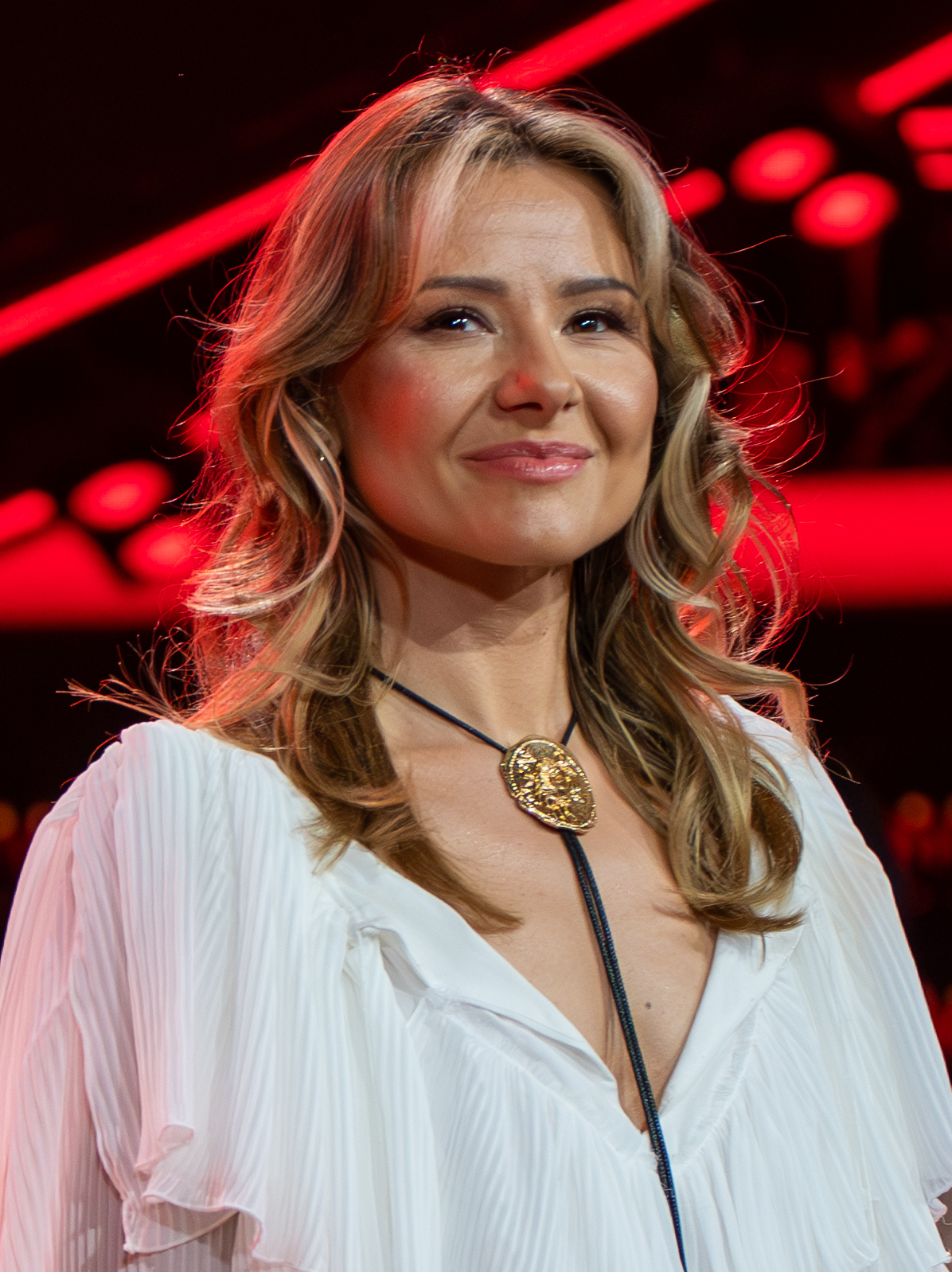
- Karwan in 2025

Background information
- Born: 6 December 1985 (age 40); Łaszczów, Poland
- Genres: Pop, Soul, Adult Contemporary, R&B
- Occupation: Singer, songwriter, composer
- Years active: 2003–present

Anna Magdalena Karwan (born 6 December 1985) is a Polish singer, composer, and songwriter.

Initially beginning her career in background vocals, Karwan rose to prominence after reaching third place on the seventh season of the talent show The Voice of Poland in 2016. She has released two solo studio albums: Ania Karwan in 2019 and Swobodnie in 2023.

== Early life ==
Anna Magdalena Karwan was born in Łaszczów on 6 December 1985 into a family that practiced the arts. Her mother, Wiktoria, played the mandolin and violin. Her father danced in a folk ensemble in his youth. As a child, Karwan danced and trained in artistic acrobatics. At the age of 16, she left the family home and moved with her mother to Warsaw, where she earned her living by working in a cafe.

== Career ==
=== 2000–2011: Career beginnings and TV appearances ===
In 2000, she appeared on the TVN program Droga do gwiazd. At the beginning of her career, she sang in restaurants and at weddings. She also collaborated as a chorist with Ania Dąbrowska, Monika Brodka, Sylwia Wiśniewska, Kasia Cerekwicka, Andrzej Piaseczny, Paulina Przybysz, Stanisław Soyka and Ania Wyszkonia. In 2006, she recorded the theme song for the TVN series Hela w opałach. In 2010, she won one of the episodes of Szansa na sukces, and in 2011 she became a semi-finalist of the second edition of the entertainment program Must Be the Music.

=== 2016–2020: The Voice of Poland and various singles ===
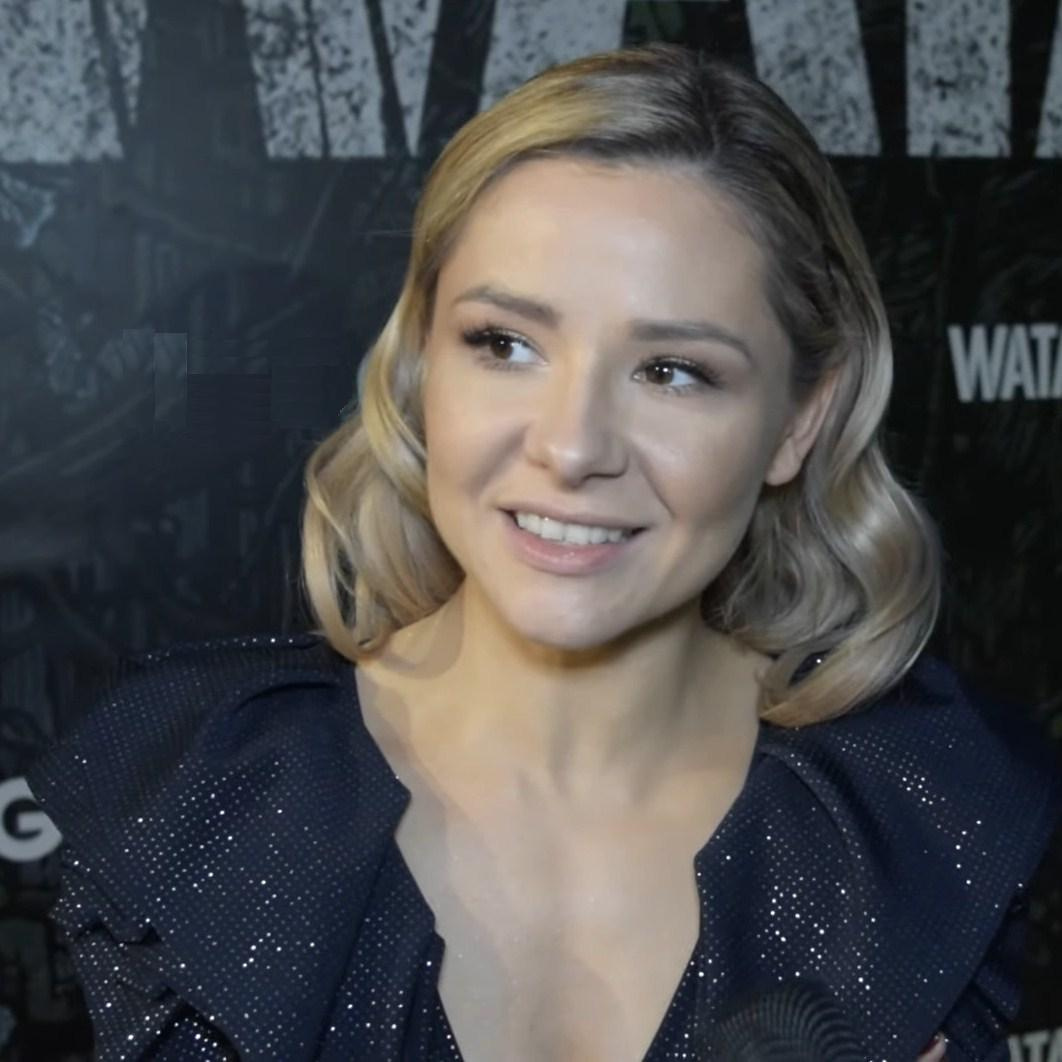
Karwan in 2019

At the beginning of 2016, she released the single "Aleja gwiazd", which is her cover of Zdzisława Sośnicka's hit from 1987. It was released with rapper Matheo. On May 17, she released the single "Mam was." Later in the year, Karwan auditioned for the season 7 of the singing competition show The Voice of Poland. All four of the show's coaches expressed interest in working with her; Karwan ultimately chose to be mentored by Natalia Kukulska. She made it to the final where she finished in third place. After participating in the program, she released the single "W Prezentie." As an actress, Karwan played the singer Ula Skowrońska in several episodes of the soap opera Barwy szczęścia from 2017 to 2018.

In 2018, she signed a recording contract with the 2TrackRecords label. On 10 August, she released the single "Głupcy." On 25 January 2019, she released the single "Czarny świt." She placed both songs on her debut album entitled Ania Karwan, which she released on 15 February 2019. With the album, she debuted at 6th place on the OLiS sales list. On June 15, she won with the song "Słucham Cię w radiu co tydzień" in the "Premier" competition during the 56th National Festival of Polish Song in Opole. In addition to the jury award, she also received two ZAiKS awards (for the music and lyrics to the song). In January 2020, she was nominated for the Fryderyk Award of the Polish phonographic industry for her phonographic debut of the year. In April, she released the fourth single from her debut album, "Dzięki tobie." Also in 2020, she participated in the 11th edition of the entertainment program Dancing with the Stars. She finished in fifth place.

=== 2022–present: Mask Singer, Swobodnie, and The Voice of Poland coach ===
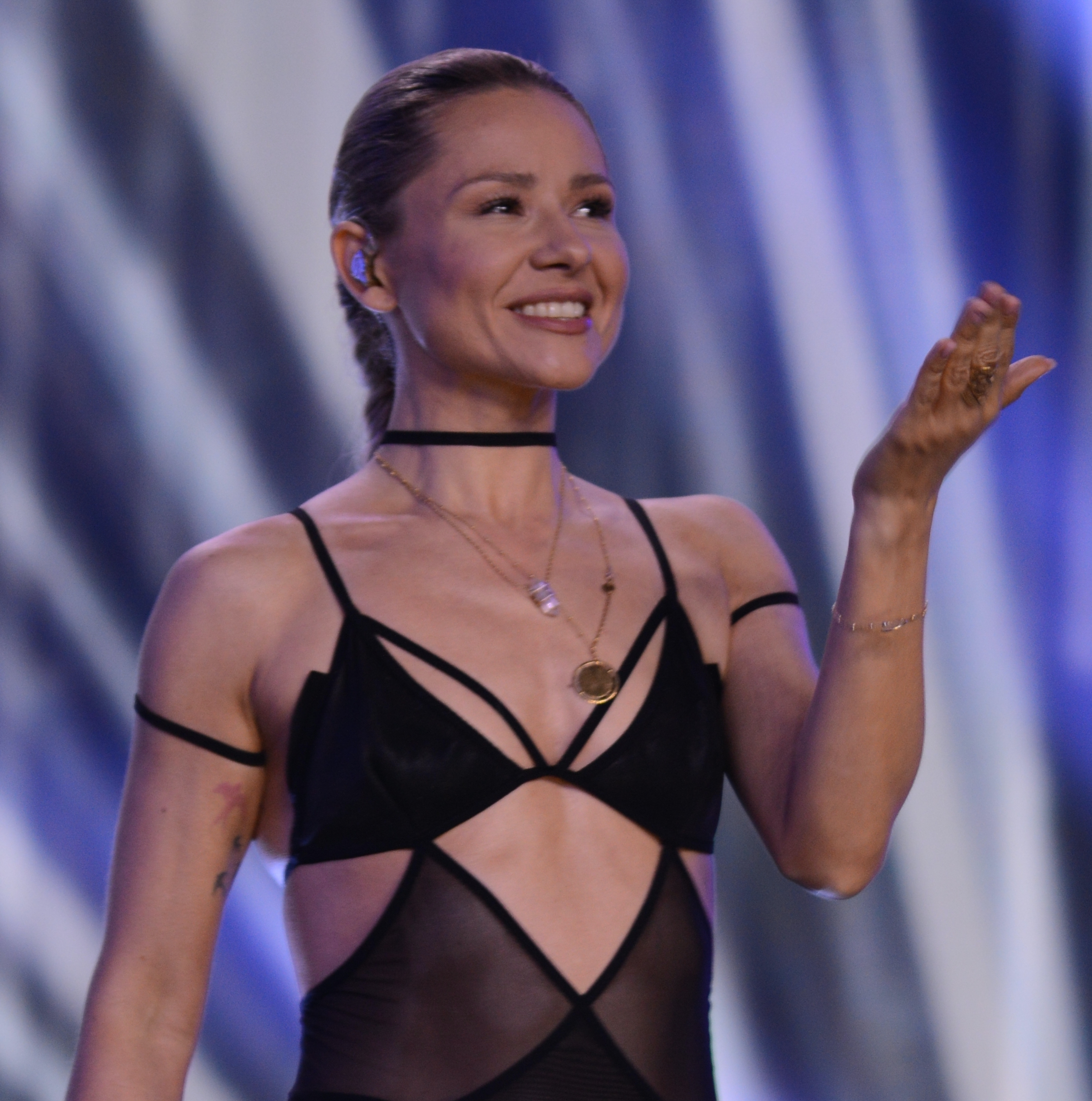
Karwan performing in 2022

In 2022, Karwan finished as the runner-up in the first edition of the entertainment program Mask Singer on TVN. On 24 March 2023, she released her second studio album entitled Swobodnie. In August 2025, it was confirmed that Karwan would become a coach in The Voice Comeback Stage on the 16th season of The Voice of Poland, selecting previously eliminated artists for her team.

== Discography ==
=== Albums ===
List of studio albums, with selected details
Title	Details
Ania Karwan	Released: 15 March 2019 (POL); Label: Warner Music Poland
Swobodnie	Released: 24 March 2023 (POL); Label: Agora

=== Singles ===
- 2015 : "Nie idź" (with Matheo)
- 2016 : "Nie ma Cię"
- 2017 : "W prezencie"
- 2017 : "Mam was"
- 2018 : "Głupcy"
- 2019 : "Czarny świt"
- 2019 : "Słucham Cię w radiu co tydzień"
- 2019 : "The Secret Game"
- 2020 : "Dzięki Tobie"
- 2022 : "Ostatni raz"
- 2022 : "Swobodnie"
- 2022 : "Papierosy"
- 2022 : "Kiedy mrugam"
- 2023 : "Kiedy mrugam (Już się nie boję)"
- 2023 : "Sen na pogodne dni"
- 2023 : "Biegnę, biegnę"
- 2023 : "Stop"
