= Kuba Badach =

Polish singer and composer (born 1976)

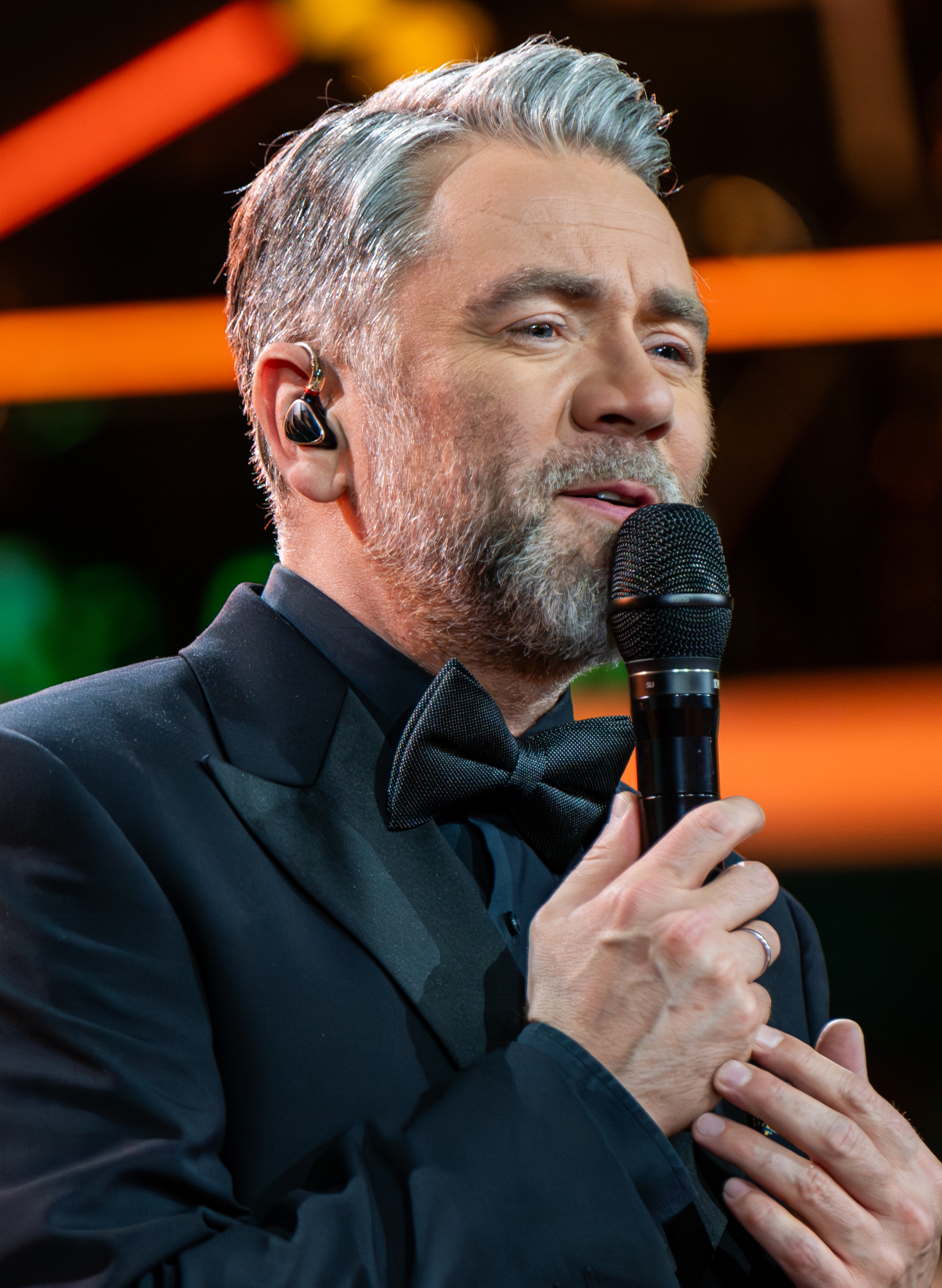
- Badach in 2025

Background information
- Born: Jakub Bartłomiej Badach; 24 August 1976 (age 49)
- Origin: Krasnystaw, Poland
- Genres: pop, pop-rock, jazz
- Occupation(s): Singer, composer
- Instrument(s): piano, keyboard instruments, bass guitar
- Years active: 1988–present
- Labels: Studio Izabelin, Agencja Artystyczna Big Bem, Agora SA
- Website: https://www.kubabadach.pl/

Kuba Badach (Polish pronunciation: [ˈkuba ˈbadax]; born 24 August 1976) is a Polish singer, composer, arranger, music producer, music journalist and television personality. He's a co-founder and member of the band Poluzjanci and member of the band The Globetrotters. He's been nominated for the two Fryderyk awards.

In 2024, Badach became a coach on the fifteenth season of The Voice of Poland. Badach was the winning coach when his artist Anna Iwanek won the season.

== Discography ==
=== With Poluzjanci ===
- Tak po prostu (2000)
- Druga płyta (2010)
- Trzy metry ponad ziemią (2011)

=== With The Globetrotters ===
- The Globetrotters (2000)
- Fairy Tales of the Trees (2003)
- Both Sides (2006)
- Stop. Don't Talk (2009)

=== Solo ===
- Gwiazdkowe cuda (1988)
- Tribute to Andrzej Zaucha. Obecny (2009)
- Oldschool (2017)
