= You Can Dance – Po Prostu Tańcz! season 7 =

You Can Dance – Po Prostu Tańcz!
- Season 7
- Hosted by: Patricia Kazadi
- Judges: Augustin Egurolla; Michał Piróg; Kinga Rusin
- Winner: Brian Poniatowski
- Runner-up: Anna Matlewska

Release
- Original network: TVN (also TVN HD and TVN HD+1)
- Original release: 7 March – 6 June 2012

Season chronology
- ← Previous; Season 6 Next → Season 8

The seventh series of You Can Dance - Po prostu Tańcz! premiered on TVN on 7 March 2012. Augustin Egurolla, Michał Piróg and Kinga Rusin returned as judges and Patricia Kazadi presents the show again. The auditions began on 11 December 2011 in Kraków and ended on 12–13 January 2012 in Warsaw.

The winner of the show will receive a three-month scholarship at the International Dance Academy in Los Angeles, the place where many famous artists, including Lady Gaga, Justin Bieber, Rihanna and Britney Spears, train. The winner will also have their personal trainer, who will take care of dancer's abilities and launching career in the United States. In previous years, the main prize was a scholarship at Broadway Dance Center in New York.

== Auditions ==
The auditions were held in five Polish cities. The first day was an open audition, when the producers chose auditionees, who would perform in front of the judges and live audience. The filmed audition with judges took place on the following day. Footage from these auditions was shown in the first five episodes.

Episode air date	Audition city	Venue	Open audition	Filmed audition	Tickets
7 March 2012	Kraków	Nowohuckie Centrum Kultury	11 December 2011	12 December 2011	9
14 March 2012	Gdańsk	Wybrzeże Theatre	15 December 2011	16 December 2011	8
21 March 2012	Lublin	Musical Theatre	19 December 2011	20 December 2011	5
28 March 2012	Szczecin	Dolls Theatre Pleciuga	9 January 2012	10 January 2012	7
4 April 2012	Warsaw	Studio Theatre	12 January 2012	13 January 2012	7
Total number of tickets to Santa Cruz					36

=== Top 36 dancers ===
During the auditions judges picked 36 dancers. These dancers were taking part in a choreography camp in Santa Cruz.

City	Dancer	Age	Style	Number of dancers	Number of top 14 dancers
Kraków	Sebastian Mazur^{1}	22	Jazz	9	4
Kraków	Mateusz Sobecko	19	Hip-Hop	9	4
Kraków	Paweł Hołderny	22	Breakdance	9	4
Kraków	Natalia Zduńska	18	Contemporary	9	4
Kraków	Brajan Poniatowski	22	Contemporary	9	4
Kraków	Marek Hylak	22	Krump	9	4
Kraków	Gracja Górniak		Contemporary	9	4
Kraków	Magdalena Zwierzyńska	25	Hip-Hop	9	4
Kraków	Artur Golec		Hip-Hop	9	4
Gdańsk	Angelika Paradowska	19	Modern	8	2
Gdańsk	Kamil Ignaczuk	17	Contemporary	8	2
Gdańsk	Kinga Mucha	25	Hip-Hop	8	2
Gdańsk	Kamil Kaim	20	Hip-Hop/Wacking	8	2
Gdańsk	Natalia Andersz	20	Modern	8	2
Gdańsk	Karolina Barańska	20	Contemporary	8	2
Gdańsk	Bartosz Wilniewicz	19	Jazz	8	2
Gdańsk	Barbara Węgorzewska^{2}	17	Lyrical Jazz	8	2
Lublin	Igor Leonik	17	Contemporary	5	2
Lublin	Mateusz Porwoł	22	Hip-Hop	5	2
Lublin	Martyna Andrzejczak	17	Jazz	5	2
Lublin	Michał Przybyła	18	Jazz	5	2
Lublin	Joanna Sobczak^{2}	21	Contemporary/Hip-Hop	5	2
Szczecin	Sarah Kukliński	23	Hip-Hop	7	2
Szczecin	Magdalena Jakubowska	26	Contemporary/Jazz	7	2
Szczecin	Edyta Wajer	23	Hip-Hop	7	2
Szczecin	Joanna Zwierzyńska	26	Zouka/Jazz	7	2
Szczecin	Oliwia Berkowska		Contemporary	7	2
Szczecin	Joanna Tuliszka	20	Balet/Contemporary	7	2
Szczecin	Jessica Ali	19	Hip-Hop/Dancehall	7	2
Warsaw	Radek Peciak "Shin Tao"	26	Hip-Hop	7	4
Warsaw	Anna Matlewska^{3}	16	Contemporary	7	4
Warsaw	Karolina Dziemieszkiewicz^{3}	23	Hip-Hop	7	4
Warsaw	Artur Świrad^{3}	21	Tap	7	4
Warsaw	Stanisław Korotyński	22	Hip-Hop	7	4
Warsaw	Wojciech Koper^{2}		Contemporary	7	4
Warsaw	Jakub Frydrychewicz^{2}	25	Hip-Hop	7	4

^1 This dancer was shown in a pre-season sneak peek.

^2 These dancers were shown only in youcandance.tvn.pl website extras.

^3 These dancers earned the tickets after the choreography round.

=== Returning dancers ===
This season there were some dancers returning from previous seasons.

Dancer	Age	Style	Previous attempt(s)	This season Result
Mateusz Sobecko	19	Hip-Hop	Season 5; Audition	Top 10 (Withdraw)
Brian Poniatowski	22	Contemporary	Season 4; Top 36	Winner
Kinga Mucha	25	Hip-Hop	Season 6; Audition	Top 8
Magdalena Zwierzyńska	25	Hip-Hop	Season 6; Audition	Top 4
Karolina Barańska	20	Contemporary	Season 5; Top 36	Top 36
Edyta Wajer	23	Hip-Hop	Season 6; Top 36	Top 36
Oliwia Berkowska		Contemporary	Previous seasons; Auditions	Top 36
Joanna Tuliszka	20	Ballet/Contemporary	Previous seasons; Auditions	Top 36
Jakub Frydrychewicz	25	Hip-Hop	Seasons 3, 5 and 6; Auditions	Top 12
Patryk Rybarski	27	Jazz/Pole Dance	Seasons 1 and 6; Workshops	Audition Choreography round

== Choreography Camp (Casablanca) week ==
Judges: Agustin Egurolla, Kinga Rusin, Michał Piróg

Task/style	Music	Choreographer(s)
Salsa		Brian van der Kust
Jazz	Alone - Celine Dion	Matthew Tseng
Krump	Why Stop Now - Busta Rhymes	Kwame "Big Wave" Osei
Final Choreography	Talk That Talk - Rihanna	Tina Landon

=== Eliminations during Choreography Camp ===
- Dancers were practising choreographies during first three days of the Camp. Then there were no cuts. Judges gave some dancers who didn't handle the choreographies well yellow cards; second yellow equals a red card. Some dancers received red cards immediately, before even getting a yellow card.
- After rehearsals contestants performed in every style they practiced - then judges cut 12 dancers.
- After these cuts the remaining contestants faced the Final Choreography round with Tina Landon.
- Some dancers had to dance for their lives after the Final Choreography round.

==== Order of eliminations ====
- Red Cards: Edyta Wajer
- First elimination after 3 days: Artur Świrad, Radek "Shin Tao" Peciak, Natalia Andersz, Paweł Porwoł, Marek Hylak, Angelika Paradowska, Karolina Barańska, Magdalena Jakubowska, Jessica Ali
- Cuts after dancing for life after the 1st elimination: Natalia Zduńska
- Cuts after Final Choreography round: Gracja Górniak, Wojciech Koper, Kamil Ignaczuk, Barbara Węgorzewska, Oliwia Berkowska
- Cuts after dancing for life after the Final Choreography round: Joanna Tuliszka, Paweł Hołderny, Michał Przybyła, Artur Golec

== Top 14 contestants ==
=== Women ===
Finalist	Age	Home Town	Dance Specialty	SMS Number	Elimination date
Anna Matlewska	16	Golina	Contemporary	1	Runner-Up
Magdalena Zwierzyńska	25	Warsaw	Hip-Hop	11	30 May 2012
Joanna Zwierzyńska	26	Warsaw	Jazz/Salsa	9	23 May 2012
Kinga Mucha	25	Ostrów Wielkopolski	Hip-Hop	13	2 May 2012; Re-entered competition (3 May 2012); 16 May 2012
Karolina "Cuki" Dziemieszkiewicz	23	Warsaw	Hip-Hop	7	9 May 2012
Martyna Andrzejczak	17	Ruda Śląska	Jazz	3	2 May 2012 - Withdrew
Sarah Kukliński	23	Berlin, Germany	Hip-Hop	5	25 April 2012

=== Men ===
Finalist	Age	Home Town	Dance Specialty	SMS Number	Elimination date
Brian Poniatowski	22	Siedlce	Contemporary	6	Winner
Igor Leonik	17	Siedlce	Contemporary	8	30 May 2012; Re-entered competition (16 May 2012)
Bartosz Wilniewicz	19	Kołacz	Contemporary	10	23 May 2012
Stanisław Korotyński	22	Łódź	Hip-Hop	2	16 May 2012
Mateusz Sobecko	19	Ruda Śląska	Hip-Hop	4	16 May - Withdrew
Jakub "Frycek" Frydrychewicz	25	Warsaw	Hip-Hop	12	2 May 2012
Sebastian Mazur	22	Denver, United States	Jazz	14	25 April 2012

== Elimination chart ==
Key:
Female	Male	Bottom 3 Couples	Eliminated	Withdrew	Winner	Runner-Up

	Week:	04/25	05/02	05/09	05/16	05/23	05/30	06/06
	Contestant	Result						
Final Top 2	Brian Poniatowski			Btm 3				WINNER
Final Top 2	Anna Matlewska	Btm 3	Btm 3		Btm 3			Runner Up
Top 4	Magdalena Zwierzyńska		Btm 3	Btm 3	Btm 3		Elim	
Top 4	Igor Leonik	Btm 3		~~Elim~~	Btm 3		Elim	
Top 6	Joanna Zwierzyńska	Btm 3				Elim		
Top 6	Bartosz Wilniewicz	Btm 3	Btm 3	Btm 3	Btm 3	Elim		
Top 8	Kinga Mucha		~~Elim~~	Btm 3	Elim			
Top 8	Stanisław Korotyński		Btm 3		Elim			
Top 8	Mateusz Sobecko				WD			
Top 10	Karolina "Cuki" Dziemieszkiewkicz			Elim				
Top 10	Martyna Andrzejczak			WD				
Top 12	Jakub "Frycek" Frydrychewicz		Elim					
Top 14	Sarah Kukliński	Elim						
Top 14	Sebastian Mazur	Elim						

Note 1: Because of injury Martyna Andrzejczak had to leave the competition. She was replaced by the female dancer who was eliminated last week - Kinga Mucha. According to So You Think You Can Dance rules she will be allowed to come back next season.
Note 2: Because of injury Mateusz Sobecko had to leave the competition. He was replaced by the male dancer who was eliminated last week - Igor Leonik. According to So You Think You Can Dance rules he will be allowed to come back next season.

== Performance nights ==
=== Week 1: Top 14 (25 April 2012) ===
- Group Dance: Outta Your Mind — Lil Jon ft. LMFAO (Krump; Choreographer: Kwame "Big Wave" Osai)
- Top 14 Couple dances:

Couple	Style	Music	Choreographer(s)	Results
Karolina "Cuki" Dziemieszkiewicz; Mateusz Sobecko	Dancehall	She Doesn't Mind - Sean Paul	Agnieszka Bota	Safe
Martyna Andrzejczak; Brian Poniatowski	Jazz	Maszynka Do Świerkania - Czesław Śpiewa	Katarzyna Kizior	Safe
Kinga Mucha; Jakub Frydrychewicz	Hip-Hop L.A. Style	Turn Up The Music - Chris Brown ft. Rihanna	Tomasz Prządka (season 3)	Safe
Sarah Kukliński; Sebastian Mazur	Modern Underground	People Help The People - Birdy	Ksena Audrey	Both Eliminated
Joanna Zwierzyńska; Igor Leonik	Salsa	Conga - Gloria Estefan	Jhesus Aponte	Bottom 3
Anna Matlewska; Bartosz Wiliniewicz	Contemporary	Walking on Air - Kerli	Karolina Kroczak	Bottom 3
Magdalena Zwierzyńska; Stanisław Korotyński	Krump	Won't Back Down - Eminem feat. Pink	Kwame "Big Wave" Osai	Safe

- Bottom 3 Couples solos:

Dancer	Style	Music	Result
Sarah Kukliński	Hip-Hop	Skin - Rihanna	Eliminated
Sebastian Mazur	Jazz	Gang Bang - Madonna	Eliminated
Joanna Zwierzyńska	Jazz	Skinny Love - Birdy	Safe
Igor Leonik	Contemporary	Lego House - Ed Sheeran	Safe
Anna Matlewska	Contemporary	Indestructible (acoustic version) - Robyn	Safe
Bartosz Wiliniewicz	Contemporary	Heartbeat - Nneka	Safe

- Eliminated:
  - Sarah Kukliński
  - Sebastian Mazur

=== Week 2: Top 12 (2 May 2012) ===
- Group Dance: Off To The Races — Lana Del Rey (Jazz; Choreographer: Geneviève Dorion-Coupal)
- Top 12 Couple dances:

Couple	Style	Music	Choreographer(s)	Results
Magdalena Zwierzyńska; Stanisław Korotyński	House	Sexy and I Know It - LMFAO	Justyna Lichacy	Bottom 3
Kinga Mucha; Jakub Frydrychewicz	Ragga	Dancehall - Natural Dread Killaz	Sylwia Kuczyńska	Both Eliminated
Martyna Andrzejczak; Brian Poniatowski	Contemporary	Parla Piu Piano - Katherina Jenkins	Geneviève Dorion-Coupal	Safe
Karolina "Cuki" Dziemieszkiewicz; Mateusz Sobecko	Hip-Hop	HOV Lane - Nicki Minaj	Marcin Mrożiński (season 3)	Safe
Anna Matlewska; Bartosz Wiliniewicz	Modern	Black Dove - Tori Amos	Geneviève Dorion-Coupal	Bottom 3
Joanna Zwierzyńska; Igor Leonik	Jazz	Rumour Has It - Adele	Mariusz Olszewski	Safe

- Bottom 3 Couples solos:

Dancer	Style	Music	Result
Magdalena Zwierzyńska	Jazz/Lyrical Hip-Hop	Wild Horses - Natasha Bedingfield	Safe
Stanisław Korotyński	Hip-Hop	Marvin & Chardonnay - Big Sean ft. Kanye West & Roscoe Dash	Safe
Kinga Mucha	Hip-Hop	Moment 4 Life - Nicki Minaj ft. Drake	Eliminated
Jakub Frydrychewicz	Hip-Hop	Promises - Nero (Skrillex remix)	Eliminated
Anna Matlewska	Contemporary	Cry - Rihanna	Safe
Bartosz Wiliniewicz	Contemporary	Personal Jesus - Marilyn Manson	Safe

- Eliminated:
  - Kinga Mucha
  - Jakub Frydrychewicz

=== Week 3: Top 10 (9 May 2012) ===
- Group Dance: National Anthem — Lana Del Rey (Modern Underground; Choreographer: Thierry Verger)
- Top 10 Couple dances:

Couple	Style	Music	Choreographer(s)	Results
Magda Zwierzyńska; Brian Poniatowski	Lyrical Jazz	Guardo che luna - Ferruccio Spinetti & Petra Magoni	Luciano di Natale	Bottom 3
Joanna Zwierzyńska; Mateusz Sobecko	Lyrical Hip Hop	Dance for You - Beyoncé	Tomasz Prządka (season 3)	Safe
Anna Matlewska; Stanisław Korotyński	Contemporary	Someone like You - Adele	Mariusz Olszewski	Safe
Karolina Dziemieszkiewkicz; Igor Leonik	Hip-Hop	Hearbeat - Nneka	Justyna Lichacy	Both Eliminated
Kinga Mucha; Bartosz Wiliniewicz	Modal Underground	Need You Tonight - Liv Tyler	Thierry Verger	Bottom 3

- Bottom 3 Couples solos:

Dancer	Style	Music	Result
Magdalena Zwierzyńska	Lyrical Hip-Hop	Can't Be Friends - Trey Songz	Safe
Brian Poniatowski	Contemporary	Earth Song (Hani's Club Experience) - Michael Jackson	Safe
Karolina "Cuki" Dziemieszkiewicz	Hip-Hop	I Can Transform Ya - Chris Brown	Eliminated
Igor Leonik	Contemporary	I Was Here - Beyoncé	Eliminated
Kinga Mucha	Hip-Hop	Black & Yellow - Wiz Khalifa	Safe
Bartosz Wilniewicz	Contemporary	The Unforgiven - Apocalyptica	Safe

- Eliminated:
  - Karolina "Cuki" Dziemieszkiewicz
  - Igor Leonik

=== Week 4: Top 8 (16 May 2012) ===
- Group Dances:

Dancers	Style	Music	Choreographer
Top 8 (Without Igor Leonik)	Hip-Hop	Where Have You Been - Rihanna	Dominic Lawrence
Top 4 Female Dancers	Hip-Hop/Jazz	212 - Azealia Banks	Marcin Mrożiński
Top 4 Male Dancers	Jazz	Temptation - Tom Waits	Katarzyna Kizior

- Top 8 Couple dances:

Couple	Style	Music	Choreographer(s)	Results
Joanna Zwierzyńska; Brian Poniatowski	Cha-Cha	Moves like Jagger - Maroon 5	Janja Lesar & Krzysztof Hulboj	Safe
Kinga Mucha; Stanisław Korotyński	Modern	Black Gold - Armand Amar & Sarah Nemtanu	Mariusz Olszewski	Both Eliminated
Magdalena Zwierzyńska; Bartosz Wilniewicz	Hip-Hop	Marry The Night - Lady Gaga	Dominic Lawrence	Bottom 3
Anna Matlewska; Igor Leonik	Contemporary	If You Go Away - Emiliana Torrini	Karolina Kroczak	Bottom 3

- Bottom 3 Couples solos:

Dancer	Style	Music	Result
Kinga Mucha	Hip-Hop	Dedication To My Ex - Lloyd ft. Andre 3000	Eliminated
Stanisław Korotyński	Hip-Hop	Betonowe Lasy Mokną - DonGuralEsko	Eliminated
Magdalena Zwierzyńska	Hip-Hop	Beez in The Trap - Nicki Minaj ft. 2 Chainz	Safe
Bartosz Wilniewicz	Contemporary	Everything - Lifehouse	Safe
Anna Matlewska	Contemporary	Holding out for a hero - Ella Mea Bowen	Safe
Igor Leonik	Contemporary	Oh! Darling — The Beatles	Safe

- Eliminated:
  - Kinga Mucha
  - Stanisław Korotyński

=== Week 5: Top 6 (23 May 2012) ===
- Group Dance:Body - Sean Paul(Hip-Hop/Dancehall; Choreographer: Joao Assuncao)
- Couple dances:

Couple	Style	Music	Choreographer(s)	Result
Joanna Zwierzyńska; Bartosz Wilniewicz	Jazz	Down - Jason Walker	Paweł Michno	Both Eliminated
Joanna Zwierzyńska; Bartosz Wilniewicz	Ragga	In Jamaica - Elephant Man	Joao Assuncao	Both Eliminated
Anna Matlewska; Brian Poniatowski	Hip-Hop L.A. Style	Turn Me On - David Guetta ft. Nicki Minaj	Ilona Bekier (season 5)	Safe
Anna Matlewska; Brian Poniatowski	Contemporary	Skinny Love - Birdy	Mariusz Olszewski	Safe
Magdalena Zwierzyńska; Igor Leonik	Contemporary	Girl With One Eye - Florence & The Machine	Katarzyna Kizior	Safe
Magdalena Zwierzyńska; Igor Leonik	Pop	Hit the Road Jack - Ray Charles	Rafał "Roofi" Kamiński (season 1)	Safe

- Top 6's solos:

Dancer	Style	Music	Result
Joanna Zwierzyńska	Jazz		Eliminated
Bartosz Wilniewicz	Contemporary		Eliminated
Anna Matlewska	Contemporary		Safe
Brian Poniatowski	Contemporary		Safe
Magdalena Zwierzyńska	Hip-Hop		Safe
Igor Leonik	Contemporary		Safe

- Eliminated:
  - Joanna Zwierzyńska
  - Bartosz Wilniewicz

=== Week 6: Top 4 (30 May 2012) ===
- Group Dance: Put Your Graffiti On Me - Kat Graham (Jazz; Choreographer: Matthew Tseng)
- Couple dances:

Couple	Style	Music	Choreographer(s)	Result
Anna Matlewska; Igor Leonik	Hip-Hop	We Found Love - Rihanna ft. Calvin Harris	Andrew Baterina	Leonik Eliminated
Magdalena Zwierzyńska; Brian Poniatowski	Jazz	Madly In Love With You - Sean McConnell	Matthew Tseng	Zwierzyńska Eliminated
Anna Matlewska; Magdalena Zwierzyńska	Pop	International Love - Pitbull ft. Chris Brown	Andrew Baterina	Zwierzyńska Eliminated
Igor Leonik; Brian Poniatowski	Modern	Path vol. 2 - Apocalyptica ft. Sandra Nasic	Karolina Kroczak	Leonik Eliminated

- Top 4's solos:

Dancer	Style	Music	Result
Anna Matlewska	Contemporary	Dziwny jest ten świat - Czesław Niemen	Safe
Brian Poniatowski	Contemporary	A Song for You- Donny Hathaway	Safe
Magdalena Zwierzyńska	Hip-Hop	Look at Me Now — Chris Brown feat. Lil Wayne & Busta Rhymes	Eliminated
Igor Leonik	Contemporary	I Don't Want to Miss a Thing - Aerosmith	Eliminated

- Results:
  - Winner: Brian Poniatowski
  - Runner Up: Anna Matlewska

=== Week 7: Finale - Top 2 (6 June 2012) ===
- Guest Dancer:
  - Patrizia Kazadi & Rafał "Roofi" Kamiński (season 1) - Troublemaker - Taio Cruz - Hip-Hop
- Group dances:

Dancers	Style	Music	Choreographer
Top 14	House	Dance Again - Jennifer Lopez ft. Pitbull	Jojo Diggs
Top 8 (Without Top 2)	Contemporary	Iron - Woodkid	Katarzyna Kizior

- Top 2 Couple dances:

Couple	Style	Music	Choreographer(s)
Anna Matlewska; Brian Poniatowski	Hip-Hop	Beautiful People - Chris Brown & Benny Benassi	Jojo Diggs
Anna Matlewska; Jakub Jóżwiak	Contemporary	Blinding - Florence And The Machine	Jonathan Huor
Anna Andrzejewska; Brian Poniatowski	Contemporary	Jóga - Björk	Jonathan Huor

- Top 2 solos:

Dancer	Style	Music	Result
Anna Matlewska	Contemporary	Wild Horses - Charlotte Martin	Runner-Up
Brian Poniatowski	Contemporary	Kiss from a Rose - Seal	Winner

- Results:
  - Winner: Brian Poniatowski
  - Runner Up: Anna Matlewska

== All-stars ==
During the season finale all-stars danced with the finalists as the part of the competition. Every dancer was asked which dancer they want to dance with. And the dreams came true, because the top 2 were privileged to dance with their favourite You Can Dance - Po Prostu Tańcz! dancer.

== Controversy ==
In his role as executive judge, Agustin Egurolla has overruled several of the majority decisions of the judges panel over the course of the season. The first of these was a decision to give auditioner Sarah Kukliński a ticket to boot camp, despite opposition from both Kinga Rusin and Michał Piróg. Later, in the Top 8 live show he made a unilateral decision to select Anna Matlewska and Igor Leonik as bottom (dance for your lives) dancers for that week, although the other two judges felt they should be safe. He said he felt Matlewska had only had to prove herself in contemporary styles so far in the competition, mitigating the impressiveness of her performance to that date.

== First for any So You Think You Can Dance series ==
- From this season every dancer has his/her own SMS number, and it won't be changed during the season.

== First for You Can Dance - Po Prostu Tańcz! ==
- SMS cost has reduced from last season. Now it is 2.46 PLN per SMS; in previous seasons it was 3.69 PLN per SMS.
- The winner gets a 3-month scholarship to the International Dance Academy in Los Angeles.

== Ratings ==
Episode	Date	Official rating (millions)	Share (%)	Share 16-49 (%)	Source(s)
Auditions 1	7 March	2.59	19.7	21.3	
Auditions 2	14 March	3.00	22.8	26.7	
Auditions 3	21 March	2.62	21.1	21.0	
Auditions 4	28 March	—N/a	—N/a	—N/a	
Auditions 5 & Santa Cruz 1	4 April	2.83	20.9	23.1	
Santa Cruz 2	11 April	2.76	21.5	23.0	
Santa Cruz 3	18 April	—N/a	—N/a	—N/a	
Live Show Top 14	25 April	—N/a	—N/a	—N/a	
Live Show Top 12	2 May	—N/a	—N/a	—N/a	
Live Show Top 10	9 May	—N/a	—N/a	—N/a	
Live Show Top 8	16 May	—N/a	—N/a	—N/a	
Live Show Top 6	23 May	—N/a	—N/a	—N/a	
Live Show Top 4	30 May	—N/a	—N/a	—N/a	
Live Show Top 2	6 June	2.6	21.1	—N/a	
Average	2012	2.54	20.6	21.3	
