= You Can Dance – Po Prostu Tańcz! season 6 =

You Can Dance – Po Prostu Tańcz!
- Season 6
- Hosted by: Patricia Kazadi
- Judges: Agustin Egurolla; Michał Piróg; Kinga Rusin
- Winner: Dominik Olechowski
- Runner-up: Paulina Przestrzelska

Release
- Original network: TVN (also TVN HD and TVN HD+1)
- Original release: 2 March – 1 June 2011

Season chronology
- ← Previous; Season 5 Next → Season 7

The sixth season of You Can Dance – Po prostu Tańcz began on 2 March 2011 on TVN. The dancers compete to win PLN 100,000 and a 3-month scholarship in dance school Broadway Dance Center, but first they have to go through auditions. Later, 36 contestants do the workshops abroad – this season in Casablanca, Morocco. This seasons on choreography camp special guest choreographer was Tyce Diorio. From fourteen people, two dancers are eliminated in each episode, to the final episode that features the top 2 contestants. For the first time the show is hosted by Patricia Kazadi. The judges are Agustin Egurolla, Michał Piróg and Kinga Rusin who joined the panel after hosting the five previous seasons.

== Auditions ==
Open auditions for this season were held in the following locations:

City	Venue	Audition
Gdańsk	Wybrzeże Theatre	12 December 2010
Lublin	Musical Theatre	14 December 2010
Kraków	Kraków Opera	4 January 2011
Wrocław	Polish Theatre	11 January 2011
Warsaw	Studio Theatre	14 January 2011

The song during Sneak Peeks at the end of the episode is Just Lose It – Eminem

=== Top 36 dancers ===
During the auditions judges picked 36 dancers. These dancers were taking part in choreography camp in Morocco.

City	Dancer	Age	Style	Number of dancers	Number of top 14 dancers
Gdańsk	Darek Bujnowski	16	Jazz/Hip-Hop	8	2
Gdańsk	Grzegorz Jankowski	18	Hip-Hop/Hutting	8	2
Gdańsk	Edyta Niemiec	27	Jazz	8	2
Gdańsk	Michał Maciejewski	25	Breakdance/Contemporary	8	2
Gdańsk	Paweł Kofman	21	Wacking	8	2
Gdańsk	Nadia Balsewicz	20	Erotic dance	8	2
Gdańsk	Piotr Nowicki^{1}	21	Hip-Hop/Pop	8	2
Gdańsk	Tomasz Piotrowski^{1}	20	Hip-Hop	8	2
Lublin	Alisa Floryńska	21	Hip-Hop/Dancehall	8	4
Lublin	Paweł Tolak	25	Hip-Hop/Popping	8	4
Lublin	Michalina Twarowska	20	Hip-Hop/Salsa	8	4
Lublin	Aleksander Tyburek	20	Popping/Electric Boogaloo	8	4
Lublin	Jakub Pursa	16	Jazz	8	4
Lublin	Szymon Pasterski^{1}		Breakdance/Contemporary	8	4
Lublin	Adrian Wilczko	23	Ballroom	8	4
Lublin	Joanna Kozłowska^{1}		Hip-Hop	8	4
Kraków	Agnieszka Szewczyk	20	Contemporary/Broadway	8	2
Kraków	Natalia Serhej^{1}	19	Hip-Hop	8	2
Kraków	Kamil Piotrowski^{1}	18	Contemporary	8	2
Kraków	Sonia Felbur^{1}	19	Hip-Hop/Contemporary	8	2
Kraków	Kinga Biegańska^{1}	16	Jazz/Modern	8	2
Kraków	Dominika Cybulska^{1}	25	Lyrical Jazz	8	2
Kraków	Maciej Kuchta^{1}	18	Contemporary	8	2
Kraków	Paulina Przestrzelska^{1}	19	Hip-Hop/House	8	2
Wrocław	Masha Tryputsen	23	Contemporary	9	5
Wrocław	Edyta Wajer	22	Hip-Hop	9	5
Wrocław	Sebastian Piotrowicz	22	Contemporary	9	5
Wrocław	Anna Tarnowska	20	Ballroom	9	5
Wrocław	Grzegorz Cherubiński	20	Boogie Woogie/Rock & Roll	9	5
Wrocław	Martyna Kapral^{2}	17	Hip-Hop	9	5
Wrocław	Dominik Olechowski	20	Contemporary	9	5
Wrocław	Marcos De Lima	22	National dances	9	5
Wrocław	Anna Tomczak^{1}	25	Hip-Hop	9	5
Warsaw	Sonia Mirpuri	17	Hip-Hop	3	1
Warsaw	Patryk Rybarski	26	Jazz/Pole dance	3	1
Warsaw	Magdalena Wójcik^{2}	18	Hip-Hop/Jazz	3	1
Total number of tickets to Casablanca					36

^1 These dancers were shown only in youcandance.tvn.pl website extras.

^2 These dancers earned the tickets after choreography round.

=== Returning Dancers ===
This season there were some returning dancers, who were trying their chances last seasons.

Dancer	Age	Style	Previous attempt(s)	This season Result
Edyta Niemiec	27	Jazz	Seasons 03, 05; Choreography Round	Top 36
Alisa Floryńska	21	Hip-Hop/Dancehall	Season 5; Top 36	Top 8
Michalina Twarowska	20	Hip-Hop/Salsa	Season 4; Final Choreography round (Dance for live)	Final Choreography round
Adrian Wilczko	23	Ballroom	Season 4; Top 36	Top 10
Agnieszka Szewczyk	20	Contemporary/Broadway	Season 5;Final Choreography round	Top 10
Paulina Przestrzelska	19	Hip-Hop/House	Season 5; Audition (Choreography Round)	Runner Up
Sebastian Piotrowicz	22	Contemporary	Season 5; Top 16 (Injury)	Top 4
Dominik Olechowski	20	Contemporary/Hip-Hop	Season 5; Final Choreography round (Dance for live)	Winner
Patryk Rybarski	26	Jazz/Pole Dance	Season 1; Final Choreography round	Top 36

== Choreography Camp (Casablanca) week ==
Judges: Agustin Egurolla, Kinga Rusin, Michał Piróg

Task/style	Music	Choreographer(s)
Hip-Hop	Moment 4 Life – Nicki Minaj ft. Drake	Gigi Torres
Salsa	Tu Loco Loco – Doug Beavers y Su Conjunto Rovira	Brian van der Kust
Jazz	Eppure Sentire – Elisa	Luciano Di Natale
Krump	Ante Up – M.O.P	Kwame "Big Wave" Osei
Gnawa's war dance	Played by drummer	Unknown
Moroccan Hip-Hop	Unknown	Unknown
Belly Dance	Unknown	NOOR
Final Choreography (Broadway)	All That Jazz – Renée Zellweger & Catherine Zeta-Jones	Tyce Diorio

=== Eliminations during Choreography Camp ===
- Dancers were practising choreographies during first three days of the Camp. Then there were no cuts, judges gave some dancers, who didn't handle the choreographies well yellow cards, second yellow equals red card.
- After rehearsals contestants performed in every style they practiced, after every style judges cut dancers.
- After these cuts remaining contestants went to Marrakesh to Final Choreography round with Tyce Diorio

Red Cards: Marcos De Lima, Aleksander Tyburek, Cuts after Hip-Hop: Maciej Kuchta, Cuts after Jazz: Paweł Kofman, Tomasz Piotrowski, Natalia Serhej, Sonja Mirpuri, Edyta Wajer Cuts after Salsa: Patryk Rybarski, Szymon Pasterski, Cuts after Final Choreography round: Kamil Piotrowski, Grzegorz Cherubiński, Dominika Cybulska, Michalina Twarowska, Kinga Biegańska Cuts after dancing for live: Piotr Nowicki, Martyna Kapral, Joanna Kozłowska, Sonja Felbur

== Top 14 Contestants ==
=== Women ===
Finalist	Age	Home Town	Dance Specialty	Elimination date
Paulina Przestrzelska	19	Warsaw	Hip-Hop	Runner Up
Anna Tarnowska	20	Wrocław	Ballroom	25 May 2011
Maryia (Masha) Triputsen	23	Minsk, Belarus	Contemporary	18 May 2011
Alisa Floryńska	21	Kyiv, Ukraine	Hip-Hop/Lyrical Hip-Hop/Dancehall	11 May 2011
Agnieszka Szewczyk	20	Warsaw	Contemporary/Broadway Jazz	4 May 2011
Anna Tomczak	25	Warsaw	Hip-Hop	27 April 2011
Magdalena Wójcik	19	Warsaw	Jazz/Hip-Hop	20 April 2011

=== Men ===
Finalist	Age	Home Town	Dance Specialty	Elimination date
Dominik Olechowski	20	Kraków	Contemporary	Winner
Sebastian Piotrowicz	22	Warsaw	Contemporary	18 May 2011; Re-entered competition (23 May 2011); 25 May 2011
Michał Maciejewski	25	Chotomów	Breakdance/Musical Theatre/Contemporary/Jazz	23 May 2011 (Injury)
Jakub Pursa	16	Jabłonna	Modern Jazz	11 May 2011
Adrian Wilczko	24	Białystok	Ballroom	4 May 2011
Paweł "Tolek" Tolak	26	Warsaw	Lyrical Hip-Hop/Popping	27 April 2011
Dariusz Bujnowski	16	Warsaw	Contemporary/Hip-Hop/Lyrical Hip-Hop	20 April 2011

== Elimination chart ==
Key:
Female	Male	Bottom 3 Couples	Eliminated	Injury	Withdrew	Winner	Runner-Up

	Week:	04/20	04/27	05/04	05/11	05/18	05/25	06/02
	Contestant	Result						
Final Top 2	Dominik Olechowski	Btm 3	Btm 3		Btm 3			WINNER
Final Top 2	Paulina Przestrzelska	Injury	Btm 3	Btm 3	Btm 3			Runner Up
Top 4	Sebastian Piotrowicz			Btm 3		~~Elim~~	Elim	
Top 4	Anna Tarnowska				Btm 3		Elim	
Top 4	Michał Maciejewski				Btm 3		WD	
Top 6	Maryia "Masha" Tryputsen			Btm 3		Elim		
Top 8	Jakub Pursa	Btm 3	Btm 3	Btm 3	Elim			
Top 8	Alisa Floryńska		Btm 3		Elim			
Top 10	Adrian Wilczko		Injury	Elim				
Top 10	Agnieszka Szewczyk	Btm 3	Btm 3	Elim				
Top 12	Paweł "Tolek" Tolak		Elim					
Top 12	Anna Tomczak		Elim					
Top 14	Dariusz Bujnowski	Elim						
Top 14	Magdalena Wójcik	Elim						

Note: Because of back injury Michał Maciejewski had to leave the competition. He was replaced by the male dancer, who was eliminated last week – Sebastian Piotrowicz. According to So You Think You Can Dance rules he will be allowed to come back next season, but not straight to the top 14, but only to audition.

== Performance nights ==
=== Week 1: Top 14 Showcase (13 April 2011) ===
- Group Dance: Forget You — Cee Lo Green (Jazz; Choreographer: Geneviève Dorion-Coupal)
- Musical Performance: Patricia Kazadi – Look Around
- Guest Dancers:
  - Jakub Jóżwiak & Paulina Figińska – season 5 Winner & Runner-Up (Contemporary) – La Ritournelle – Sebastian Tellier
  - Along with Patricia Kazadi performed 12 dancers from previous seasons: Marcin Mrożiński, Tomasz Prządka (season 3); Anna Kapera, Klaudia "Jadżka" Koruba, Rafał Kabungwe, Julia Żytko (season 4); Ilona Bekier; Aleksander Paliński; Jakub Piotrowicz; Adam Kościelniak; Katarzyna Bień; Leal Zielińska (season 5). The routine was choreographed by Agustin Egurolla
- Top 14 Couple dances:

Couple	Style	Music	Choreographer(s)
Magdalena Wójcik; Dariusz Bujnowski	Modern Jazz	Ewakuacja – Ewa Farna	Karolina Kroczak
Anna Tarnowska; Adrian Wilczko	Cha-Cha-Cha	S&M – Rihanna	Janja Lesar & Krzysztof Hulboj
Masha Triputsen; Michał Maciejewski	Contemporary	Fischikella – Czesław Śpiewa	Katarzyna Kizior
Paulina Przestrzelska; Dominik Olechowski	Hip-Hop	Do It Like a Dude – Jessie J	Romeo "Freedom" Ballayn
Alisa Floryńska; Sebastian Piotrowicz	Broadway	Express – Christina Aguilera	Geneviève Dorion-Coupal
Anna Tomczak; Paweł Tolak	House	The Time (Dirty Bit) – The Black Eyed Peas	Gabriel Francisco
Agnieszka Szewczyk; Jakub Pursa	Jazz	Grenade – Bruno Mars	Piotr Jagielski

This episode there were no eliminations, but Judges have picked the best and the worst performance of the week. The public voted and picked the best performance of the week

- According to Judges:
  - The Best Couple Performance: Masha Tryputsen & Michał Maciejewski
- Results of Voting
  - The Best Couple Performance: Masha Tryputsen & Michał Maciejewski

=== Week 2: Top 14 (20 April 2011) ===
- Group Dance: I Get It In — Omarion ft. Gucci Mane (Krump; Choreographer: Kwame "Big Wave" Osai)
- Top 14 Couple dances:

Couple	Style	Music	Choreographer(s)	Results
Anna Tarnowska; Adrian Wilczko	Jive	Rock&rollin' Love – Afromental	Jan Kliment	Safe
Alisa Floryńska; Sebastian Piotrowicz	Pop	Born This Way – Lady Gaga	Tomasz Prządka (season 3)	Safe
Masha Tryputsen; Michał Maciejewski	Lyrical Jazz	Better Days – Ayọ	Paweł Michno	Safe
Anna Kapera^{#} Dominik Olechowski	Contemporary	Bound To You – Christina Aguilera	Karolina Kroczak	Bottom 3
Magdalena Wójcik; Dariusz Bujnowski	Hip-Hop	Move (If You Wanna) – Mims	Marcin Mrożiński (season 3)	Both Eliminated
Agnieszka Szewczyk; Jakub Pursa	Broadway	Mack The Knife – Patricia Kazadi	Jacek Wazelin	Bottom 3
Anna Tomczak; Paweł Tolak	Krump	Bring It On Down (Battlezone) – Fii Stylz	Kwame "Big Wave" Osai	Safe

^{#} – This week Paulina Przestrzelska did not perform due to her knee injury. She was replaced by Anna Kapera – season 4 winner. She will be in bottom 3 next week.

- Bottom 3 Couples solos:

Dancer	Style	Music	Result
Dariusz Bujnowski	Hip-Hop	X Gon' Give It to Ya – DMX	Eliminated
Magdalena Wójcik	Jazz	Heartbeat – Nneka	Eliminated
Dominik Olechowski	Contemporary	All Roads – Amerie	Safe
Agnieszka Szewczyk	Contemporary	Better Days – Ayọ	Safe
Jakub Pursa	Contemporary	In This Shirt – The Irrepressibles	Safe

- Eliminated:
  - Magdalena Wójcik
  - Dariusz Bujnowski

=== Week 3: Top 12 (27 April 2011) ===
- Group Dance: Till The World Ends — Britney Spears (Wacking; Choreographer: Matt Cady)
- Top 12 Couple dances:

Couple	Style	Music	Choreographer(s)	Results
Anna Tomczak; Jakub Pursa	Modern	War in Me – Kenna	Katarzyna Kizior	Tomczak Eliminated
Alisa Floryńska; Paweł Tolak	Samba	Wheel N Stop – Basement Jaxx ft. Serocee	Mariusz Olszewski	Tolak Eliminated
Masha Tryputsen; Sebastian Piotrowicz	Contemporary	Heavy in Your Arms – Florence and The Machine	Mariusz Olszewski	Safe
Agnieszka Szewczyk; Dominik Olechowski	Pop	Million Dollar Bill – Whitney Houston	Rafał "Roofi" Kamiński (season 1)	Bottom 3
Paulina Przestrzelska; Łukasz Zięba ^{#^{1}}	Jazz	Where Were You – Maria Mena	Paweł Michno	Safe^{#^{2}}
Anna Tarnowska; Michał Maciejewski	Hip-Hop	Mama Knows Best – Jessie J	Matt Cady	Safe

^{#^{1}} – This week Adrian Wilczko did not perform due to his injury. He was replaced by Łukasz Zięba – season 4 Runner-Up. He will be in bottom 3 next week.
^{#^{2}} – Paulina Przestrzelska had to perform the solo because of last week absence.

- Bottom 3 Couples solos:

Dancer	Style	Music	Result
Paulina Przestrzelska	Hip-Hop	Bust Your Windows – Jazmine Sullivan	Safe
Jakub Pursa	Contemporary	Theme from Schindler's List – John Williams & Itzhak Perlman	Safe
Anna Tomczak	Hip-Hop	Just Can't Get Enough – Black Eyed Peas	Eliminated
Paweł Tolak	Lyrical hip-hop	Skin – Rihanna	Eliminated
Alisa Floryńska	Hip-Hop	Kill Dem – Busta Rhymes ft. Tosh & Pharrell Williams	Safe
Dominik Olechowski	Contemporary	Belief — Gavin DeGraw	Safe
Agnieszka Szewczyk	Broadway	Le Disko — Shiny Toy Guns	Safe

- Eliminated:
  - Anna Tomczak
  - Paweł Tolak

=== Week 4: Top 10 (4 May 2011) ===
- Group Dance: Sherlock Holmes theme – Hans Zimmer (Jazz; Choreographer: Paweł Michno)
- Guest Dancers:
  - Natalia Pełka – 10-year-old girl who auditioned in Warsaw. She performed with Marcin Mrożiński and Tomasz Prządka – (both season 3) – Fergalicious – Fergie
- Top 10 Couple dances:

Couple	Style	Music	Choreographer(s)	Results
Masha Tryputsen; Adrian Wilczko^{#}	Afro dance	Hussel – M.I.A.	Maria Foryś (season 1)	Wilczko Eliminated
Anna Tarnowska; Dominik Olechowski	American Smooth	A New Day Has Come – Céline Dion	Mariusz Olszewski	Safe
Alisa Floryńska; Michał Maciejewski	Jazz	Turning Tables – Adele	Matthew Tseng	Safe
Paulina Przestrzelska; Jakub Pursa	Hip-Hop	Oh My Love – Chris Brown	Cass Smith	Bottom 3
Agnieszka Szewczyk; Sebastian Piotrowicz	Contemporary	Drumming Song – Florence and the Machine	Matthew Tseng	Szewczyk Eliminated

^{#} – Adrian Wilczko a had to perform the solo because of last week absence.

- Bottom 3 Couples solos:

Dancer	Style	Music	Result
Masza Triputsen	Krump	I Can Transform Ya – Chris Brown	Safe
Adrian Wilczko	Jive	Choo Choo Ch'Boogie – Chilli Willi and the Red Hot Peppers	Eliminated
Paulina Przestrzelska	House	Barracuda X – Matt Kowalsky feat. MC Sqbass	Safe
Jakub Pursa	Contemporary	Cosmic Love – Florence and the Machine	Safe
Agnieszka Szewczyk	Contemporary	I'm Kissing You – Des'ree	Eliminated
Sebastian Piotrowicz	Contemporary	You Raise Me Up – Josh Groban	Safe

- Eliminated:
  - Agnieszka Szewczyk
  - Adrian Wilczko

=== Week 5: Top 8 (11 May 2011) ===
- Group Dances:

Dancers	Style	Music	Choreographer
Top 8	Broadway	Show Me How You Burlesque – Christina Aguilera	Mariusz Olszewski
Top 4 Male Dancers (with Patricia Kazadi)	Hip-Hop	Toyfriend – David Guetta ft. Wynter Gordon	Dominic Lawrence
Top 4 Female Dancers	Hip-Hop New Age	Blow – Kesha	Tomasz Prządka (season 3)

- Top 8 Couple dances:

Couple	Style	Music	Choreographer(s)	Results
Jakub Pursa; Anna Tarnowska	Contemporary	Gravity – Sara Bareilles	Mariusz Olszewski	Pursa Eliminated
Michał Maciejewski; Paulina Przestrzelska	Locking	War – Edwin Starr	Wojciech "Blacha" Blaszko	Bottom 3
Sebastian Piotrowicz; Masha Tryputsen	Modern	Je veux – Zaz	Karolina Kroczak	Safe
Dominik Olechowski; Alisa Floryńska	Hip-Hop	Who's That Chick? – Rihanna ft. David Guetta	Dominic Lawrence	Floryńska Eliminated

- Bottom 3 Couples solos:

Dancer	Style	Music	Result
Jakub Pursa	Contemporary	Waking Up – OneRepublic	Eliminated
Anna Tarnowska	Jive	I Got You (I Feel Good) – James Brown/Wake Me Up Before You Go-Go – Wham!	Safe
Michał Maciejewski	Breakdance	Habibi – Ali Hassan Kuban	Safe
Paulina Przestrzelska	Jazz	Addicted – Kelly Clarkson	Safe
Dominik Olechowski	Contemporary	The Finish Line – Train	Safe
Alisa Floryńska	Dancehall	Bobblehead [*] – Christina Aguilera	Eliminated

- Eliminated:
  - Alisa Floryńska
  - Jakub Pursa

=== Week 6: Top 6 (18 May 2011) ===
- Group Dance: Runnin – Lil Wayne ft. Shanell (Contemporary; Choreographer: Geneviève Dorion-Coupal)
- Couple dances:

Couple	Style	Music	Choreographer(s)	Result
Masha Tryputsen; Michał Maciejewski	Pop	This Instant – Sophia Fresh ft. T-Pain	Cass Smith	Tryputsen Eliminated
Masha Tryputsen; Michał Maciejewski	Contemporary	Closer – Kings of Leon	Geneviève Dorion-Coupal	Tryputsen Eliminated
Anna Tarnowska; Sebastian Piotrowicz	Lyrical Jazz	The Silence – Alexandra Burke	Jonathan Huor	Piotrowicz Eliminated
Anna Tarnowska; Sebastian Piotrowicz	Reggaeton	Rompe – Daddy Yankee	Cass Smith	Piotrowicz Eliminated
Paulina Przestrzelska; Dominik Olechowski	Hip-Hop	Roman's Revenge – Nicki Minaj	Marcin Mroziński (season 3)	Safe
Paulina Przestrzelska; Dominik Olechowski	Modern	Fix You – Coldplay	Jonathan Huor	Safe

- Top 6's solos:

Dancer	Style	Music	Result
Masha Tyrputsen	Contemporary	Whatcha Say – Jason Derulo	Eliminated
Michał Maciejewski	Contemporary	Ghetto Gospel – 2Pac	Safe
Anna Tarnowska	Contemporary/Samba	Best Girl – Taio Cruz/Jungle Drum – Emiliana Torrini	Safe
Sebastian Piotrowicz	Contemporary	Dream On – Aerosmith	Eliminated
Paulina Przestrzelska	Jazz	Back to Black – Amy Winehouse	Safe
Dominik Olechowski	Hip-Hop	Katy Perry – E.T.	Safe

- Eliminated:
  - Masha Tryputsen
  - Sebastian Piotrowicz

=== Week 7: Semi-Finale – Top 4 (25 May 2011) ===
- Group Dance: Judas – Lady Gaga (; Choreographer: Thierry Verger)
- Guest Dancer:
  - DzikiStyl Company – Dancers from previous seasons: Patryk Gacki (season 1), Wioletta Fiuk (season 3 winner), Kamil Kowalski, Paulina Figińska and Jakub Jóżwiak (season 5) along with Mikołaj Wieczór and Angelika Paradowska – Eye for an Eye – Unkle from "Dzieci innego Boga"
- Couple dances:

Couple	Style	Music	Choreographer(s)	Result
Anna Tarnowska; Dominik Olechowski	Modern	Babe I'm Gonna Leave You – Led Zeppelin	Katarzyna Kizior	Tarnowska Eliminated
Paulina Przestrzelska; Sebastian Piotrowicz	Jazz	You Lost Me – Christina Aguilera	Paweł Michno	Piotrowicz Eliminated
Sebastian Piotrowicz; Dominik Olechowski	Modal Underground	Sen – My Riot	Thierry Verger	Piotrowicz Eliminated
Paulina Przestrzelska; Anna Tarnowska	Hip-Hop	E.T. – Katy Perry ft. Kanye West	Ilona Bekier (season 5)	Tarnowska Eliminated

- Top 4's solos:

Dancer	Style	Music	Result
Anna Tarnowska	Rumba	Ahi Estas Tu – Chambao	Eliminated
Dominik Olechowski	Contemporary	This Woman's Work – Maxwell	Safe
Paulina Przestrzelska	Hip-Hop/House	Nowy Plan – Matt Kowalsky ft. MS Roza	Safe
Sebastian Piotrowicz	Contemporary	You Are So Beautiful – Joe Cocker	Eliminated

- Eliminated:
  - Anna Tarnowska
  - Sebastian Piotrowicz

=== Week 8: Finale – Top 2 (1 June 2011) ===
- Guest Dancer:
  - Patryk Rybarski (Top 36) & Katarzyna "Mila" Kordzińska (season 2) – Pole dance – Another Way To Die – Alicia Keys ft. Jack White
- Group dances:

Dancers	Style	Music	Choreographer
Top 14	Hip-Hop	Yeah 3x – Chris Brown	Matt Cady
Top 14 (Without Top 2)	Contemporary	Dżem – Modlitwa III by Kasia Kowalska	Mariusz Olszewski
Top 14 (Without Top 2)	Hip-Hop/Contemporary/Ballroom	Hałas – Patricia Kazadi	Matt Cady

- Top 2 Couple dances:

Couple	Style	Music	Choreographer(s)
Paulina Przestrzelska; Dominik Olechowski	Contemporary	For Bitter or Worse – Anouk	Mariusz Olszewski
Paulina Przestrzelska; Dominik Olechowski	Hip-Hop	Only Girl (In The World) – Rihanna	Matt Cady

- Top 2 solos:

Dancer	Style	Music	Result
Paulina Przestrzelska	Hip-Hop	Halo – Beyoncé	Runner-Up
Dominik Olechowski	Contemporary	This Bitter Earth – Dinah Washington & Max Richter	Winner

- Results:
  - Winner: Dominik Olechowski
  - Runner Up: Paulina Przestrzelska

== Special Episode ==
=== Taniec kontra Dance (Dance vs. Dance!) (11 June 2011) ===
This episode was live from Białystok. There were two teams – professional dancers from Dancing with the Stars (Taniec z Gwiazdam) and You Can Dance: Po prostu tańcz! dancers. DWTS team leader was Rafał Maserak (DWTS dancer) and YCD team Patricia Kazadi (YCD presenter). Piotr Gąsowski (DWTS presenter) was the presenter this show.

- Judges:
  - Michał Piróg – So You Think You Can Dance
  - Maja Sablewska – X Factor
  - Piotr Galiński – Dancing with the Stars
- Musical Guests: X Factor finalists:
  - William Malcolm – "Mercy"
  - Ada Szulc – "Don't Stop the Music"
  - Michał Szpak – "I Don't Wanna Miss a Thing"
- Contestants:
- You Can Dance Group:
  - Ilona Bekier (season 5)
  - Ada Kawecka (season 3)
  - Klaudia Koruba (season 4)
  - Anna Kapera (season 4 WINNER)
  - Maria Foryś (season 1)
  - Leal Zielińska (season 5)
  - Marcin Mroziński (season 3)
  - Karol Niecikowski (season 3)
  - Tomasz Prządka (season 3)
  - Adam Kościelniak (season 5)
  - Aleksander Paliński (season 5)
  - Rafał Kamiński (season 1)
- Dancing with the Stars Group:
  - Izabela Janachowska (season 9–12)
  - Janja Lesar (season 8–10,12)
  - Anna Głogowska (season 1–3, 7–8, 10–12)
  - Magdalena Soszyńska-Michno (season 1–3, 5–9, 11–12)
  - Paulina Biernat (season 11)
  - Nina Tyrka (season 7 & 12)
  - Robert Rowiński (season 3–4, 6, 11–12)
  - Jan Kliment (season 10–12)
  - Stefano Terrazzino (season 4–6, 8, 11)
  - Krzysztof Hulboj (season 8–10, 12)
  - Michał Uryniuk (season 7)
  - Cezary Olszewski (season 7–10, 12)
- Special performance: So You Think You Can Dance (Poland) (season 6) Top 14 dancers: Yeah 3x – Chris Brown (Hip-Hop); Choreographer: Matt Cady

Round	Team/Dancers	Dance	Music	Choreographer
1 (Own Choice Dances)	Dancing with the Stars Team	Salsa/Samba	Gloria Estefan – "Conga" performed by Adam Sztaba's orchestra	Jan Kliment
1 (Own Choice Dances)	You Can Dance Team	Hip-Hop	Let's Go – Busta Rhymes ft. Twista, Lil Jon & Yelawolf	Rafał "Roofi" Kamiński
2 (Style Chosen by Opposite Team)	Dancing with the Stars Team	Hip-Hop	Run The World (Girls) – Beyoncé	Sylwia Kuczyńska
2 (Style Chosen by Opposite Team)	You Can Dance Team	Cha-cha-cha	A Little Less Conversation (JXL Radio Edit Remix) – Elvis Presley	Mariusz Olszewski
3 (Battle)	Both teams	Ballroom/Hip-Hop	Picture Perfect – Chris Brown	Dancers
4 (Team Leaders Dances)	Patricia Kazadi (YCD team leader) & Rafal "Roofi" Kamiński	Hip-Hop	What's My Name – Rihanna ft. Drake	Rafał "Roofi" Kamiński
4 (Team Leaders Dances)	Rafał Maserak (DWTS team leader) & Magdalena Soszyńska-Michno	Jive/Cha-cha-cha	Hit the Road Jack – Ray Charles/S&M – Rihanna	Rafał Maserak; Magdalena Soszyńska-Michno

- Results:
  - 1st Place: Dancing with the Stars team
  - 2nd Plance: You Can Dance team

== First for any So You Think You Can Dance series ==
- On Top 6 show there was first ever reggaeton routine, it was danced by Anna Tarnowska & Sebastian Piotrowicz.

== Rating figures ==
Episode	Date	Official rating 4+	Share 4+	Official rating 16–49	Share 16–39
Auditions 1	2 March 2011	3 074 536	22,39%	1 681 639	25,46%
Auditions 2	9 March 2011	3 376 435	25,29%	1 765 986	28,36%
Auditions 3	16 March 2011	3 240 345	24,72%	1 694 593	27,81%
Auditions 4 Casablanca Week 1	23 March 2011	3 296 694	26,47%	1 670 997	29,31%
Casablanca Week 2	30 March 2011	3 162 112	23,87%	1 602 515	26,37%
Casablanca Week 3	6 April 2011	3 116 088	22,91%	1 665 771	26,40%
Live Show Top 14	13 April 2011	3 047 739	23,50%	1 637 953	26,40%
Live Show Top 14	20 April 2011	2 352 393	18,86%	1 155 086	19,89%
Live Show Top 12	27 April 2011	2 294 207	18,57%	1 167 594	20,33%
Live Show Top 10	4 May 2011	2 512 383	20,41%	1 247 557	21,20%
Live Show Top 8	11 May 2011	2 497 440	22,00%	1 266 647	23,60%
Live Show Top 6	18 May 2011	2 178 985	17,83%	1 032 318	17,67%
Live Show Top 4	25 May 2011	2 344 082	19,15%	1 123 400	19,26%
The Final Top 2	1 June 2011	2 414 215	19,87%	1 184 097	21,32%
Average	2011	2 687 398	21,39%	1 366 719	23,16
