= Taniec kontra Dance =

- Hosted by: Piotr Gąsowski
- Judges: Michał Piróg; Maja Sablewska; Piotr Galiński
- Winner: Dancing With The Stars team
- Runner-up: So You Think You Can Dance team
- Finals venue: Białystok

Release
- Original network: TVN
- Original release: 11 June 2011

Taniec kontra Dance (Eng. Dancing vs. Dance) was a Polish special television series which featured professional dancers from Dancing With The Stars and contestants of So You Think You Can Dance competing for viewers' votes. The event was staged on 11 June 2011 on Kościuszko Market Square in Białystok. Judge Piotr Galiński said after the event that Białystok was, in effect, the real winner, since it was the city's undisputed dance capital; several dancers on the You Can Dance team, including Ada Kawecka, Karol Niecikowski, and Rafał Kamiński, had trained at the city's Fair Play dance studio and taken their first steps in the same square where the event was held. The Dancing With The Stars team was mentored by Rafał Maserak and the So You Think You Can Dance team's leader was Patricia Kazadi. The judging panel consisted of Michał Piróg (judge on So You Think You Can Dance), Maja Sablewska (judge on X Factor) and Piotr Galiński (judge on Dancing With The Stars). Piotr Gąsowski, who is the presenter on Dancing With The Stars, presented the show. The competition was won by Dancing With The Stars team.

== Background ==
Taniec kontra Dance was the second such dance battle staged in Białystok, following a similarly formatted event the previous year, Dziewczyny kontra chłopaki. Po prostu bitwa! ("Girls versus Boys: Just a Battle!"). The crown awarded to the winner of that earlier contest was auctioned off during the 2011 event, with proceeds going to victims of that year's flooding in Poland.

== The teams ==
=== Dancing With The Stars team ===
- Rafał Maserak (THE LEADER)
- Izabela Janachowska (season 9-12)
- Janja Lesar (season 8-10,12)
- Anna Głogowska (season 1-3,7-8,10-12)
- Magdalena Soszyńska-Michno (season 1-3,5-9,11-12)
- Paulina Biernat (season 11)
- Nina Tyrka (season 7 & 12)
- Robert Rowiński (season 3-4,6,11-12)
- Jan Kliment (season 10-12)
- Stefano Terrazzino (season 4-6,8,11)
- Krzysztof Hulboj (season 8-10,12)
- Michał Uryniuk (season 7)
- Cezary Olszewski (season 7-10,12)

=== So You Think You Can Dance team ===
- Patricia Kazadi (THE LEADER)
- Ilona Bekier (season 5)
- Ada Kawecka (season 3)
- Klaudia Koruba (season 4)
- Anna Kapera (season 4 WINNER)
- Maria Foryś (season 1)
- Leal Zielińska (season 5)
- Marcin Mroziński (season 3)
- Karol Niecikowski (season 3)
- Tomasz Prządka (season 3)
- Adam Kościelniak (season 5)
- Aleksander Paliński (season 5)
- Rafał Kamiński (season 1)

Logo for Taniec kontra Dance

== Contest Performances ==
Round	Team/Dancers	Dance	Music	Choreographer
1 (Own Choice Dances)	Dancing with the Stars Team	Salsa/Samba	Gloria Estefan - "Conga" performed by Adam Sztaba's orchestra	Jan Kliment
1 (Own Choice Dances)	So You Think You Can Dance Team	Hip-Hop	"Let's Go" - Busta Rhymes ft. Lil Jon, Twista & Yelawolf	Rałał "Roofi" Kamiński
2 (Style Chosen by Opposite Team)	Dancing with the Stars Team	Hip-Hop	"Run the World (Girls)" - Beyoncé	Sylwia Kuczyńska
2 (Style Chosen by Opposite Team)	So You Think You Can Dance Team	Cha-cha-cha	"A Little Less Conversation" (JXL Radio Edit Remix) - Elvis Presley	Mariusz Olszewski
3 (Battle)	Both teams	Ballroom/Hip-Hop	"Picture Perfect" - Chris Brown	Dancers
4 (Dances by Team Leaders)	Patricia Kazadi (SYTYCD team leader) & Rafal "Roofi" Kamiński	Hip-Hop	"What's My Name?" - Rihanna ft. Drake	Rafał "Roofi" Kamiński
4 (Dances by Team Leaders)	Rafał Maserak (DWTS team leader) & Magdalena Soszyńska-Michno	Cha-cha-cha	"Hit the Road Jack" - Ray Charles / "S&M" - Rihanna	Rafał Maserak; Magdalena Soszyńska-Michno

== Guest Performances ==
The show featured music performances by X Factor finalists and Patricia Kazadi.

Performer	Song
William Malcolm	"Mercy"
Ada Szulc	"Don't Stop the Music"
Michał Szpak	"I Don't Want To Miss A Thing"
Patricia Kazadi	"Hałas"

== Broadcast and result ==
The event drew a crowd of thousands to Kościuszko Market Square, while the live TVN broadcast, which began at 5:20 pm, was watched by millions of viewers nationwide. The result was decided by viewer SMS voting, announced live by host Piotr Gąsowski; the Dancing With The Stars team was chosen as the winner, and judge Michał Piróg presented team leader Rafał Maserak with the winner's trophy.
