= You Can Dance – Po Prostu Tańcz! season 5 =

You Can Dance – Po Prostu Tańcz!
- Season 5
- Hosted by: Kinga Rusin
- Judges: Agustin Egurolla; Michał Piróg; Anna Mucha
- Winner: Jakub Jóźwiak
- Runner-up: Paulina Figińska

Release
- Original network: TVN, TVN HD
- Original release: March 3 – June 3, 2010

Season chronology
- ← Previous; Season 4 Next → Season 6

The fifth season of You Can Dance – Po prostu Tańcz. The dancers compete to win PLN 100,000 and a 3-month scholarship in dance school Broadway Dance Center, but first they have to go through auditions. Later, 36 contestants do the workshops abroad – this season in Tel Aviv, Israel. This seasons on choreography camp special guest choreographer was Travis Payne. From fourteen people, two dancers are eliminated in each episode, to the final episode that features the top two contestants. The show is hosted by Kinga Rusin. The judges are Agustin Egurolla, Michał Piróg and Anna Mucha. It premiered on 3 March 2010.

== Auditions ==
Season Background Song: Empire State of Mind – Jay-Z ft. Alicia Keys
Open auditions for this season were held in the following locations:

- Wrocław
- Poznań
- Gdańsk
- Kraków
- Warsaw

The song during Sneak Peeks at the end of the episode is Just Lose It – Eminem

=== Top 36 dancers ===
During the auditions judges picked 36 dancers. These dancers were taking part in choreography camp in Israel.

| City | Dancer | Age | Style | Number of dancers | Number of top 14 dancers |
|---|---|---|---|---|---|
| Wrocław | Piotr Piskorowski | 17 | Hip-Hop | 6 | 1 |
| Wrocław | Marcin Rębilas | 19 | Hip-Hop | 6 | 1 |
| Wrocław | Ewa Bielak | 21 | Hip-Hop | 6 | 1 |
| Wrocław | Dominik Olechowski^{1} | 19 | Contemporary | 6 | 1 |
| Wrocław | Agita Elskne^{1} | 27 | Hip-Hop | 6 | 1 |
| Wrocław | Bartek Górski^{1}^{2} | 21 | Contemporary | 6 | 1 |
| Poznań | Karolina Hussejn | 18 | Contemporary | 8 | 1 |
| Poznań | Mariusz Crovid | 23 | Hip-Hop/Dancehall | 8 | 1 |
| Poznań | Katarzyna Bień | 22 | Ballroom | 8 | 1 |
| Poznań | Paulina Wojtkowska^{2} | 18 | Contemporary | 8 | 1 |
| Poznań | Giulia Busalacchi^{1}^{2} | 19 | Jazz | 8 | 1 |
| Poznań | Łukasz Józefowicz^{1}^{2} | 20 | Jazz | 8 | 1 |
| Poznań | Agnieszka Szewczyk^{1}^{2} | 19 | Contemporary | 8 | 1 |
| Poznań | Rafał Milcewicz^{1} | 23 | Hip-Hop | 8 | 1 |
| Gdańsk | Paulina Turska | 21 | Salsa | 11 | 3 |
| Gdańsk | Leal Zielińska | 19 | Jazz/Contemporary | 11 | 3 |
| Gdańsk | Kamil Kowalski | 22 | Breakdance | 11 | 3 |
| Gdańsk | Paulina Figińska | 18 | Contemporary | 11 | 3 |
| Gdańsk | Jacek Januszko | 19 | Disco Travolta | 11 | 3 |
| Gdańsk | Bartosz Woszczyński | 17 | Contemporary | 11 | 3 |
| Gdańsk | Monika Czołpik | 17 | Hip-Hop/Dancehall | 11 | 3 |
| Gdańsk | Kacper Matuszewski^{2} | 26 | Krump | 11 | 3 |
| Gdańsk | Eliza Kujawska-Dziedzic^{1} | 25 | Jazz | 11 | 3 |
| Gdańsk | Anna Mrożińska^{1} | 24 | Contemporary | 11 | 3 |
| Gdańsk | Maciej Wrzaszcz^{1} | 18 | Hip-Hop | 11 | 3 |
| Kraków | Katarzyna Mieczkowska | 23 | Jazz | 8 | 7 |
| Kraków | Sebastian Piotrowicz^{2} | 21 | Contemporary | 8 | 7 |
| Kraków | Ilona Bekier | 22 | Hip-Hop | 8 | 7 |
| Kraków | Adam Kościelniak | 22 | Hip-Hop | 8 | 7 |
| Kraków | Tomasz Barański | 29 | Ballroom | 8 | 7 |
| Kraków | Anna Andrzejewska | 25 | Ballet/Contemporary | 8 | 7 |
| Kraków | Aleksancer Paliński | 19 | Modern | 8 | 7 |
| Kraków | Kamila Drapało^{2} | 17 | New Age/Contemporary | 8 | 7 |
| Warsaw | Jakub Piotrowicz | 21 | Contemporary | 3 | 2 |
| Warsaw | Alisa Floryńska^{2} | 20 | Hip-Hop/Dancehall | 3 | 2 |
| Warsaw | Jakub Jóżwiak | 25 | Contemporary/Jazz | 3 | 2 |
| Total number of tickets to Tel Aviv | | | | | 36 |

^1These dancers were shown only in youcandance.tvn.pl website extras or in special internet series You Can Dance Extra on Onet Vod.
^2These dancers earned the tickets after choreography round.

=== Returning Dancers ===
This season there were some returning dancers, who were trying their chances last seasons.

| Dancer | Age | Style | Previous attempt(s) | This season Result |
|---|---|---|---|---|
| Katarzyna Bień | 22 | Ballroom | Season 3; Audition (Choreography round) | Top 10 |
| Łukasz Jóżefowicz | 20 | Jazz | Seasons 1 and 3; Audition (Choreography Round) | Top 36 |
| Giulia Busalacchi | 20 | Jazz | Season 4; Audition | Top 36 |
| Damian Czeszewski | 25 | Ballroom | Season 1; Final Choreography round Season 2; Audition | Audition |
| Leal Zielińska | 19 | Jazz/Contemporary | Season 4; Audition | Top 8 |
| Paulina Figińska | 18 | Contemporary | Season 4; Top 36 | Runner-up |
| Kacper Matuszewski | 26 | Krump | Season 3; Final Choreography round (Dance for live) | Final Choreography round (leave) |
| Anna Andrzejewska | 25 | Ballet/Contemporary | Season 1; Final Choreography round (Dance for live) | Top 6 |
| Jakub Jóżwiak | 25 | Contemporary/Jazz | Season 1; Final Choreography round (Dance for live) | Winner |
| Magdalena Grzela | 25 | Ballroom | Season 4; Final Choreography round | Audition |

== Choreography Camp (Tel Aviv) week ==
Judges: Agustin Egurolla, Anna Mucha, Michał Piróg

| Task/style | Music | Choreographer(s) |
|---|---|---|
| Hora | Unknown | The Group (Dancers learnt this dance in Jaffa, 2 groups – Male and Female) |
| Hip-Hop | Tik Tok – Kesha | Anthony Kaye |
| Mambo | Unknown | Brian van der Kust |
| Contemporary | Hometown Glory – Adele | Yoram Karmi |
| Group Choreography (shown in extras) | Pump It – The Black Eyed Peas; I Can Transform Ya – Chris Brown ft. Lil Wayne; Bad Romance – Lady Gaga; Bring Me To Life – Evanescence | The Group |
| Modern Underground | Mindfields – The Prodigy | Thierry Verger |
| Final Choreography | They Don't Care About Us – Michael Jackson | Travis Payne |

== Top 14 Contestants ==
=== Women ===
| Finalist | Age | Home Town | Dance Specialty | Elimination date |
|---|---|---|---|---|
| Paulina Figińska | 18 | Zduńska Wola | Contemporary | Runner-up |
| Ilona Bekier | 22 | Nadarzyn | Hip-Hop | 26 May 2010 |
| Anna Andrzejewska | 25 | Łódź | Contemporary/Ballet | 19 May 2010 |
| Leal Zielińska | 17 | Sopot | Contemporary/Jazz/Hip-hop | 12 May 2010 |
| Katarzyna Bień | 22 | Radom | Ballroom | 5 May 2010 |
| Katarzyna Mieczkowska | 23 | Barlinek | Jazz | 28 April 2010 |
| Ewa Bielak | 21 | Kąty Wrocławskie | Hip-Hop | 21 April 2010 |

=== Men ===
| Finalist | Age | Home Town | Dance Specialty | Elimination date |
|---|---|---|---|---|
| Jakub Jóżwiak | 23 | Golina | Contemporary/Jazz | Winner |
| Tomasz Barański | 29 | Kielce | Ballrom Latin | 26 May 2010 |
| Aleksander Paliński | 19 | Brzesko | Contemporary/New Age | 19 May 2010 |
| Jakub Piotrowicz | 21 | Siedlce | Contemporary | 12 May 2010 |
| Adam Kościelniak | 22 | Warsaw | Hip-Hop | 5 May 2010; Re-entered competition (23 April 2010); 21 April 2010 |
| Bartosz Woszczyński | 17 | Siedlce | Contemporary/Jazz | 28 April 2010 |
| Sebastian Piotrowicz | 21 | Siedlce | Contemporary | Withdrew; 23 April 2010 |

== Elimination chart ==
Key:
| Female | Male | Bottom 3 Couples | Eliminated | Withdrew | Winner | Runner-up |

| | Week: | 04/21 | 04/28 | 05/05 | 05/12 | 05/19 | 05/26 | 06/03 |
| | Contestant | Result | | | | | | |
| Final Top 2 | Jakub Jóżwiak | | | Btm 3 | | | | WINNER |
| Final Top 2 | Paulina Figińska | Btm 3 | | | Btm 3 | | | Runner-up |
| Top 4 | Tomasz Barański | | Btm 3 | | Btm 3 | | Elim | |
| Top 4 | Ilona Bekier | Btm 3 | | Btm 3 | Btm 3 | | Elim | |
| Top 6 | Aleksander Paliński | Btm 3 | Btm 3 | Btm 3 | Btm 3 | Elim | | |
| Top 6 | Anna Andrzejewska | | | | | Elim | | |
| Top 8 | Jakub Piotrowicz | | | | Elim | | | |
| Top 8 | Leal Zielińska | | Btm 3 | Btm 3 | Elim | | | |
| Top 10 | Adam Kościelniak | ~~Elim~~ | | Elim | | | | |
| Top 10 | Katarzyna Bień | | Btm 3 | Elim | | | | |
| Top 12 | Bartosz Woszczyński | | Elim | | | | | |
| Top 12 | Katarzyna Mieczkowska | | Elim | | | | | |
| Top 12 | Sebastian Piotrowicz | Btm 3 | WD | | | | | |
| Top 14 | Ewa Bielak | Elim | | | | | | |

Note: According to the You Can Dance – Po Prostu Tańcz website Sebastian Piotrowicz was forced to leave the competition due to an injury. He was replaced by Adam Kościelniak, as the last male dancer eliminated, was brought back into the competition. According to rules Sebastian Piotrowicz will be allowed to come straight through top 14 dancers next season.

== Performance nights ==
=== Week 1: Top 14 Showcase (7 April 2010) ===
- Group Dance: Bohemian Rhapsody — Queen (Hip-Hop/Jazz; Choreographer: Anthony Kaye)
- Top 14 Couple dances:

| Couple | Style | Music | Choreographer(s) |
|---|---|---|---|
| Leal Zielińska; Bartosz Woszczyński | Modern | Smells Like Teen Spirit – Tori Amos | Katarzyna Kizior |
| Ilona Bekier; Sebastian Piotrowicz | Broadway | Big Spender – Shirley Bassey | Geneviève Dorion-Coupal |
| Katarzyna Mieczkowska; Jakub Piotrowicz | Pop | Try Sleeping with a Broken Heart — Alicia Keys | Rafał "Roofi" Kamiński (season 1) |
| Katarzyna Bień; Tomasz Barański | Salsa | Ran Kan Kan — Tito Puente | Jazzy Ruiz |
| Paulina Figińska; Aleksander Paliński | Contemporary | Toxic — Yael Naim | Geneviève Dorion-Coupal |
| Ewa Bielak; Adam Kościelniak | Hip-Hop | Imma Be – The Black Eyed Peas | Anthony Kaye |
| Anna Andrzejewska; Jakub Jóżwiak | Lyrical Jazz | Broken Hearted Girl – Beyoncé | Piotr Jagielski |

This episode there were no eliminations, but Judges have picked the best and the worst performance of the week. The public voted and picked the best performance of the week

- According to Judges:
  - The Best Couple Performance: Anna Andrzejewska & Jakub Jóżwiak
  - The Worst Couple Performance: Leal Zielińska & Bartosz Woszczyński
- Results of Voting
  - The Best Couple Performance: Paulina Figińska & Aleksander Paliński

=== Week 2: Top 14 (21 April 2010) ===
- Group Dance: Sweet Dreams – Beyoncé (Hip-Hop; Choreographer: Aziz Baki)
- Top 14 Couple dances:

| Couple | Style | Music | Choreographer(s) | Results |
|---|---|---|---|---|
| Ewa Bielak; Adam Kościelniak | Ragga Jam | So Fine – Sean Paul | Laure Courtellemont | Both Eliminated |
| Ilona Bekier; Sebastian Piotrowicz | Hip-Hop | I Can Transform Ya – Chris Brown | Aziz Baki | Bottom 3 |
| Katarzyna Mieczkowska; Jakub Piotrowicz | Contemporary | Testosteron – Kayah & String Royal Quartet | Karolina Kroczak | Safe |
| Paulina Figińska; Aleksander Paliński | Pop | Blah Blah Blah – Ke$ha | Aziz Baki | Bottom 3 |
| Leal Zielińska; Bartosz Woszczyński | Jazz | Hallelujah – Alexandra Burke | Paweł Michno | Safe |
| Katarzyna Bień; Tomasz Barański | Rumba | One – Bono ft. Mary J. Blige | Michał Malitowski | Safe |
| Anna Andrzejewska; Jakub Jóżwiak | Broadway | Feelin Good – Michael Bublé | Jacek Wazelin | Safe |

- Bottom 3 Couples solos:

| Dancer | Style | Music | Result |
|---|---|---|---|
| Ewa Bielak | Hip-Hop | Make Noise – Busta Rhymes | Eliminated |
| Adam Kościelniak | Hip-Hop | I Can Transform Ya – Chris Brown | Eliminated |
| Ilona Bekier | Hip-Hop | Make Me – Janet Jackson | Safe |
| Sebastian Piotowicz | Jazz | Feelin Good – Michael Bublé | Safe |
| Paulina Figińska | Contemporary | Precious Thing – Tori Amos | Safe |
| Aleksander Paliński | Jazz | I Surrender – Celine Dion | Safe |

- Eliminated:
  - Ewa Bielak
  - Adam Kościelniak

=== Week 3: Top 12 (28 April 2010) ===
- Group Dance: Sonata no. 2 in B flat minor Op. 35 – Fryderyk Chopin (Hip-Hop; Choreographer: Steve Bolton)
- Top 12 Couple dances:

| Couple | Style | Music | Choreographer(s) | Results |
|---|---|---|---|---|
| Katarzyna Bień; Bartosz Woszczyński | Hip-Hop | I Would Die 4 U – Prince | Steve Bolton; Kim Gingras (CA season 2) | Woszczyński eliminated |
| Paulina Figińska; Jakub Piotrowicz | Lyrical Jazz | New Years Day – Garou | Geneviève Dorion-Coupal; Vincent-Oliver Noiseux (CA season 1) | Safe |
| Anna Andrzejewska; Adam Kościelniak | Quickstep | Cinema Italiano – Kate Hudson | Maciej Zakliczyński | Safe |
| Katarzyna Mieczkowska; Tomasz Barański | Pop | One Love – Bob Marley | Piotr "GaUa" Gałczyk (season 1) | Mieczkowska Eliminated |
| Ilona Bekier; Jakub Jóżwiak | Contemporary | Scars – Basement Jaxx ft. Kelis Meleka & Chipmunk | Geneviève Dorion-Coupal; Kim Gingras (CA season 2); Vincent-Oliver Noiseux (CA season 1) | Safe |
| Leal Zielińska; Aleksander Paliński | Cha-Cha-Cha | Revolver – Madonna | Janja Lesar; Krzysztof Hulboj | Bottom 3 |

- Bottom 3 Couples solos:

| Dancer | Style | Music | Result |
|---|---|---|---|
| Katarzyna Bień | Cha-Cha-Cha | Beautiful Girls – Sean Kingston | Safe |
| Bartosz Woszczyński | Jazz | Leave – Glen Hansard | Eliminated |
| Katarzyna Mieczkowska | Jazz | Big in Japan – Guaro Apes | Eliminated |
| Tomasz Barański | Latin dance | Intro/Pergate/Raza De Mil Colores/Por Arriba, Por Abajo – Ricky Martin | Safe |
| Leal Zielińska | Jazz | Video Phone – Beyoncé feat. Lady Gaga | Safe |
| Aleksander Paliński | Jazz | Gravity – Sara Bareilles | Safe |

- Eliminated:
  - Katarzyna Mieczkowska
  - Bartosz Woszczyński

=== Week 4: Top 10 (5 May 2010) ===
- Group Dance: Creator – Santigold (Hip-Hop; Choreographer: Gigi Torres)
- Top 10 Couple dances:

| Couple | Style | Music | Choreographer(s) | Results |
|---|---|---|---|---|
| Katarzyna Bień; Aleksander Paliński | Lyrical Hip-Hop | Crawl – Chris Brown | Gigi Torres | Bień Eliminated |
| Anna Andrzejwska; Jakub Piotrowicz | Contemporary | Sweet Dreams (Are Made of This) – Marilyn Manson | Mariusz Olszewski | Safe |
| Ilona Bekier; Adam Kościelniak | Locking | Workin' Day And Night – Michael Jackson | Wojciech "Blacha" Blaszko | Kościelniak Eliminated |
| Leal Zielińska; Jakub Jóżwiak | Paso Doble | Bad Romance – Lady Gaga | Mariusz Olszewski | Bottom 3 |
| Paulina Figińska; Tomasz Barański | Modern Jazz | Happy – Leona Lewis | Jonathan Huor | Safe |

- Bottom 3 Couples solos:

| Dancer | Style | Music | Result |
|---|---|---|---|
| Katarzyna Bień | Jive/Hip-Hop/Jazz | Clumsy – Fergie | Eliminated |
| Aleksander Paliński | Jazz | Right Here Waiting – Richard Marx | Safe |
| Ilona Bekier | Afro Jazz | Heartbeat – Nneka | Safe |
| Adam Kościelniak | Lyrical hip-hop | Pretty Wings – Maxwell | Eliminated |
| Leal Zielińska | Jazz | Hurt – Christina Aguilera | Safe |
| Jakub Jóźwiak | Jazz | To Build a Home – The Cinematic Orchestra | Safe |

- Eliminated:
  - Adam Kościelniak
  - Katarzyna Bień

=== Week 5: Top 8 (12 May 2010) ===
- Group Dances:

| Dancers | Style | Music | Choreographer |
|---|---|---|---|
| Top 8 | Contemporary | The Lesser of Two Evils — The Witcher OST | Paweł Michno |
| Top 4 Male Dancers | Contemporary | Empire State of Mind – Alicia Keys ft. Jay-Z | Krystyna Mazurówna |
| Top 4 Female Dancers | Ragga Jam | Press It Up – Sean Paul | Joao Assuncao |

- Top 8 Couple dances:

| Couple | Style | Music | Choreographer(s) | Results |
|---|---|---|---|---|
| Paulina Figińska; Aleksander Paliński | Afro Jazz | Bird Flu – M.I.A. | Maria Foryś (season 1) | Bottom 3 |
| Leal Zielińska; Tomasz Barański | Contemporary | ATWA – System of a Down | Katarzyna Kizior | Zielińska Eliminated |
| Ilona Bekier; Jakub Piotrowicz | Jive | Broken Heels – Alexandra Burke | Mariusz Olszewski | Piotrowicz Eliminated |
| Anna Andrzejwska; Jakub Jóżwiak | Hip-Hop | Hard – Rihanna ft. Jeezy | Joao Assuncao | Safe |

- Bottom 3 Couples solos:

| Dancer | Style | Music | Result |
|---|---|---|---|
| Paulina Figińska | Contemporary | Sweet Dreams Medley – Beyoncé | Safe |
| Aleksander Paliński | Jazz | Ostatni – Edyta Bartosiewicz | Safe |
| Leal Zielińska | Jazz | Flaws and All – Beyoncé | Eliminated |
| Tomasz Barański | Jazz | This Woman's Work – Maxwell | Safe |
| Ilona Bekier | Hip-Hop | More than a Woman – Aalyiah | Safe |
| Jakub Piotowicz | Contemporary | Love's Divine – Seal | Eliminated |

- Eliminated:
  - Leal Zielińska
  - Jakub Piotowicz

=== Week 6: Top 6 (19 May 2010) ===
- Guest Dancers:
  - "Fresco Dance Company" – Running Two remix – Operation Phoenix
- Group Dances:

| Dancers | Style | Music | Choreographer |
|---|---|---|---|
| Top 6 | Contemporary | Aerosmith – Dream On | Yoram Karmi |
| Top 6 | Hip-Hop | Rude Boy — Rihanna | Anthony Kaye |

- Top 6 Couple dances:

| Couple | Style | Music | Choreographer(s) | Results |
|---|---|---|---|---|
| Anna Andrzejewska; Tomasz Barański | Jazz | Goodbye My Lover – James Blunt | Paweł Michno | Andrzejewska Eliminated |
| Ilona Bekier; Aleksander Paliński | Hip-Hop | Starry Eyed – Ellie Goulding | Anthony Kaye | Paliński Eliminated |
| Paulina Figińska; Jakub Jóżwiak | Contemporary | My All – Mariah Carey | Yoram Karmi | Safe |

- Top 6's solos:

| Dancer | Style | Music | Result |
|---|---|---|---|
| Anna Andrzejewska | Contemporary | Why – Annie Lennox | Eliminated |
| Tomasz Barański | Broadway | Fever – Michael Bublé | Safe |
| Ilona Bekier | Hip-Hop | Why Don't You Love Me – Beyoncé | Safe |
| Aleksander Paliński | Jazz | Kołysanka dla Nienajomej – Perfect | Eliminated |
| Paulina Figińska | Contemporary | Roads – Portishead | Safe |
| Jakub Jóżwiak | Contemporary | Traveling Without Moving – Jamiroquai | Safe |

- Eliminated:
  - Anna Andrzejewska
  - Aleksander Paliński

=== Week 7: Semi-finale – Top 4 (26 May 2010) ===
- Guest Dancers:
  - Rafał "Tito" Kryla (season 1) with children from his dance school – Don't Bring Me Down, Let's Get Re-Started, Simple Little Melody – The Black Eyed Peas, I See You – Leona Lewis, Rockin to the Beat – The Black Eyed Peas
- Group Dance: (I Like) Funky Music – Prince & New Power Generation (Funk;Choreographer: Daniel Celebe)
- Top 4 Couple dances:

| Couple | Style | Music | Choreographer(s) | Results |
|---|---|---|---|---|
| Ilona Bekier; Paulina Figińska | Dance hall | Break It Off – Sean Paul ft. Rihanna | Maria Foryś | Bekier Eliminated |
| Ilona Bekier; Tomasz Barański | Contemporary | Fallin' – Alicia Keys | Karolina Kroczak | Both Eliminated |
| Paulina Figińska; Jakub Jóżwiak | Contemporary | Hometown Glory – Adele | Mariusz Olszewski | Safe |
| Jakub Jóżwiak; Tomasz Barański | Electric Boogaloo | Total Funk Ultimate Collection – Brailey & George Clinton & Bootsy Coliln | Daniel Celebe | Barański Eliminated |

- Top 6's solos:

| Dancer | Style | Music | Result |
|---|---|---|---|
| Ilona Bekier | Hip-Hop | Say My Name – Destiny's Child | Eliminated |
| Tomasz Barański | Paso Doble | Fever Dream – Tyler Bates | Eliminated |
| Paulina Figińska | Contemporary | Lullaby – Lamb | Safe |
| Jakub Jóżwiak | Contemporary | Pretty Fin – Pati Yang | Safe |

- Eliminated:
  - Ilona Bekier
  - Tomasz Barański

=== Week 8: Finale – Top 2 (3 June 2010) ===
- Group dances:

| Dancers | Style | Music | Choreographer |
|---|---|---|---|
| Top 14 and season 4 Winner – Anna Kapera | Jazz | When Love Takes Over – David Guetta ft. Kelly Rowland | Stefanie Bland |
| Top 14 (Without Top 2) | Hip-Hop | OMG – Usher ft. will.i.am | Candice Brown |
| Top 14 (Without Top 2) | Contemporary | Nie Opuszczaj Mnie – Edyta Górniak | Mariusz Olszewski |

- Guest Dancers:
  - Anna Kapera season 4 winner performed in opening with Top 14
  - Jacek Januszko – He performed his own style called "Disco Travolta". He was the first ever contestant in SYTYCD PL which got ticket to Top 36 – You Should Be Dancing – Bee Gees
- Top 2 Couple dances:

| Couple | Style | Music | Choreographer(s) |
|---|---|---|---|
| Paulina Figńska; Jakub Jóżwiak | Hip-Hop | Video Phone – Beyoncé | Candice Brown |
| Paulina Figńska; Jakub Jóżwiak | Contemporary | Funhouse – Pink | Stefanie Bland |

- Top 2 solos:

| Dancer | Style | Music | Result |
|---|---|---|---|
| Paulina Figińska | Contemporary | Rabbit Heart (Raise It Up) – Florence + The Machine | Runner up |
| Jakub Jóżwiak | Contemporary | Giant Cat Woman – Pati Yang | Winner |

- Results:
  - Winner: Jakub Jóźwiak
  - Runner-up: Paulina Figińska

== Special Episode ==
=== Po Prostu Bitwa! (Just Battle!) (5 June 2010) ===
This episode was live from Białystok. There were two teams – Male and Female. Male team leader was Michał Piróg and Female team Anna Mucha. From 7 to 12 April on You Can Dance – Po Prostu Tańcz website was uploaded short movies. Later on 12 May 2010 Judges Picked 72 Dancers. Then on 15 May Judges Picked 48 Dancers. Then short films was uploaded and internauts voted. They picked 24 dancers (12 Male and 12 Female). 29.05 – 4.06 on these days were rehearsals to performance. On this episode this season top 14 performed twice. There was also Dancemob. It was danced by every person on audience. The movie with Pop choreography was published on official YCD website around month before event

- Judges: Katarzyna Skrzynecka, Piotr Gąsowski, Joanna Chitruszko
- Dancemob: Hit The Floor – Afromental – Pop
- You Can Dance Top 14's Group Dances:

| Dancers | Style | Music | Choreographer |
|---|---|---|---|
| Top 14 | Afro Jazz | Creator — Santigold | Gigi Torres |
| Top 14 | Hip-Hop | OMG – Usher ft. will.i.am | Candice Brown |

- Musical Guests:
  - Afromental – Radio Song
  - Agnieszka Chylińska – Nie Mogę Cię Zapomnieć
  - Afromental – The Bomb
- Female group:
  - Ida Nowakowska (season 1)
  - Justyna Białowąs (season 2)
  - Izabela Orzełowska (season 3)
  - Paulina Jaksim (season 3)
  - Adrianna Kawecka (season 3)
  - Adrianna Piechówka (season 4)
  - Aleksandra Chaberska (Biała Podlaska)
  - Agnieszka Miś (Dąbrowa Górnicza)
  - Magdalena Tyburska (Płock)
  - Ewelina Tomaszewicz (Suwałki)
  - Patrycja Kozłowska (Białystok)
  - Dominika Semeniuk (Piła)
  - Maja Krajewska (Bydgoszcz)
  - Luiza Smagowska (Radom)
  - Joanna Kolk (Działdowo)
  - Nicol Kupper (Kościerzyna)
  - Sylwia Murdzek (Pińczów)
  - Joanna Sokół (Skwierzyna)
- Male group:
  - Jakub Mędzrzycki (season 3)
  - Michał Pawłowski(season 3)
  - Tomasz Prządka (season 3)
  - Marcin Mrożiński (season 3)
  - Jakub Werel (season 4)
  - Damian Lipiński (Pabianice)
  - Mateusz Adamczyk (Leszno)
  - Jakub Kolasa (Ostrowiec Świętokrzyski)
  - Łukasz Kosicki (Bydgoszcz)
  - Maciej Kosicki (Bydgoszcz)
  - Mieszko Nagaj (Sanok)
  - Rafał Roczniak (Tuchów)
  - Kamil Rybiński (Radom)
  - Mateusz Włoch (Białe Błota)
  - Rafał Szłyk (Wodzisław Śląski)
  - Kajetan Luteracki (Łódź)
  - Jakub Kornalski (Konin)

=== Round 1 – Contemporary ===
- Group dances:

| Group | Style | Music | Choreographer |
|---|---|---|---|
| Female | Contemporary | All That I'm Living For – Evanescence | Mariusz Olszewski |
| Male with Michał Piróg | Contemporary | Don't Stop The Music – Basement Jaxx & Jamie Cullum | Katarzyna Kizior |

=== Round 2 – Hip-Hop ===
- Group dances:

| Group | Style | Music | Choreographer |
|---|---|---|---|
| Female | Hip-Hop | Don't Touch Me (Throw da Water on 'em) — Busta Rhymes | Rafał "Roofi" Kamiński (season 1) |
| Male | Hip-Hop | Boom Boom Pow – The Black Eyed Peas | Katarzyna Kizior |

=== Round 3 – Battle ===
- Male and Female groups – Smash Sumthin – Redman

The Battle was won after voting by Male group. They gained 57% of votes

== First for any So You Think You Can Dance series ==
- On Semi-finale episode there was first ever Electric Boogaloo routine, it was performed by Jakub Jóżwiak & Tomasz Barański.

== Rating Figures ==
| Episode | Date | Official rating 4+ | Share 4+ | Share 16–39 |
|---|---|---|---|---|
| Auditions 1 | 3 March 2010 | 3,299,051 | 22.72% | 25.97% |
| Auditions 2 | 10 March 2010 | 4,132,714 | 31.34% | 35.87% |
| Auditions 3 | 17 March 2010 | 3,729,185 | 27.73% | 30.95% |
| Auditions 4 Tel Aviv Week 1 | 24 March 2010 | 3,425,014 | 27.91% | 30.12% |
| Tel Aviv Week 2 | 31 March 2010 | 3,320,209 | 23.97% | 27.66% |
| Live Show Top 14 | 7 April 2010 | 3,212,078 | 25.09% | 28.72% |
| Live Show Top 14 | 21 April 2010 | 2,720,927 | 22.04% | 25.89% |
| Live Show Top 12 | 28 April 2010 | 2,378,343 | 18.69% | 20.44% |
| Live Show Top 10 | 5 May 2010 | 2,727,223 | 21.28% | 23.13% |
| Live Show Top 8 | 12 May 2010 | 2,540,376 | 20.36% | 22.84% |
| Live Show Top 6 | 19 May 2010 | 2,744,185 | 21.69% | 24.18% |
| Live Show Top 4 | 26 May 2010 | 3,013,932 | 24.86% | 27.14% |
| The Final Top 2 | 2 June 2010 | 2,827,035 | 21.41% | 22.63% |
| Average | 2010 | 2,997,082 | 23.30% | 26.05% |
