= You Can Dance – Po Prostu Tańcz! season 2 =

You Can Dance – Po Prostu Tańcz!
- Season 2
- Hosted by: Kinga Rusin
- Judges: Agustin Egurrola; Michał Piróg; Weronika Marczuk-Pazura; Izabella Miko (Week 9)
- Winner: Artur Ciecórski
- Runner-up: Katarzyna Kubalska

Release
- Original network: TVN
- Original release: March 5 – June 5, 2008

Season chronology
- ← Previous; Season 1 Next → Season 3

The Second season of You Can Dance – Po prostu Tańcz. The dancers compete to win PLN 100,000, and a 3-month scholarship in dance school Broadway Dance Center but first they have to go through auditions later 36 contestants do the workshops abroad country – this season Buenos Aires – Argentine, to get to the top 16 featured in the live show. In this season special guest choreographer was Marty Kudelka. From sixteen people, two dancers are eliminated in each episode (In Semi-final episode there was one contestant eliminated), to the final episode that features the top three contestants. The show is hosted by Kinga Rusin. The judges are Agustin Egurrola, Michał Piróg and Weronika Marczuk-Pazura. It premiered on 5 March 2008. Artur Cieciórski was announced as the winner 5 June 2007

== Changes from previous season ==
- In final choreography round with Guest Star Choreographer were participating only dancers in danger. The dancers which were picked to top 16 previously, might risked they place in finals and participate in the class.
- Dancers weren't coupled for 3 first live shows. After every single episode new couples were drawn.

== Auditions ==
Season Background Song: Destination Calabria – Alex Gaudino/Mission: Impossible theme

Open auditions for this season were held in the following locations:

- Bytom
- Kraków
- Gdańsk
- Warsaw

The song during sneak peeks at the end of the episode is Just Lose It – Eminem

=== Top 36 dancers ===
During the auditions judges picked 36 dancers. These dancers were taking part in choreography camp in Buenos Aires, Argentina.

City	Dancer	Age	Style	Number of dancers	Number of top 16 dancers
Bytom	Paulina Bagińska^{3}	18	Hip-Hop	6	0
Bytom	Grzegorz Moczko	25	Breakdance	6	0
Bytom	Damian Kublik	19	Hip-Hop	6	0
Bytom	Lena Kowalska	19	Contemporary	6	0
Bytom	Piotr Małecki	24	Contemporary	6	0
Kraków	Wesam El Mawafy	28	Bellydance	7	4
Kraków	Żaneta Majcher	18	Jazz	7	4
Kraków	Kamil Guzy	18	Ballet	7	4
Kraków	Kryspin Hermański^{2}	26	Ballet/Contemporary	7	4
Kraków	Anna Radomska^{2}	24	Ballroom	7	4
Kraków	Adrian Dobrzyński^{2}			7	4
Kraków	Anna Kłos^{2}		Contemporary	7	4
Gdańsk	Natalia Wojdak	21	Ballroom	8	4
Gdańsk	Patryk Rożniecki	19	Hip-Hop/New Style	8	4
Gdańsk	Kamil Węsierski	18	National dances/Ballet	8	4
Gdańsk	Ewa Radev^{2}	17	Jazz	8	4
Gdańsk	Artur Cieciórski	30	Hip-Hop/Disco Freestyle	8	4
Gdańsk	Ewa Mędrzycka	21	Jazz	8	4
Gdańsk	Patrycja Peters^{3}	21	Contemporary	8	4
Gdańsk	Adam Błachowicz^{1}	23	Locking	8	4
Warsaw: Day 1	Aneta Gąsiewicz	20	Dancehall/Hip-Hop	10	5
Warsaw: Day 1	Katarzyna Kordzińska	25	Jazz/Broadway	10	5
Warsaw: Day 1	Rafał Szostok	22	Breakdance	10	5
Warsaw: Day 1	Paweł Grala	23	Jazz	10	5
Warsaw: Day 1	Gieorgij Puchalski	19	Contemporary	10	5
Warsaw: Day 1	Katarzyna Kubalska	19	Ballet/Contemporary	10	5
Warsaw: Day 1	Edyta Fiuk^{1}		Hip-Hop	10	5
Warsaw: Day 1	Artur Bieńkowski^{2}			10	5
Warsaw: Day 1	Joanna Kozłowska^{2}		Hip-Hop	10	5
Warsaw: Day 1	Filip Wala^{2}	20	Ballroom	10	5
Warsaw: Day 2	Piotr Nawrocki	28	Hip-Hop/Breakdance/Capoeira	5	3
Warsaw: Day 2	Justyna Białowąs	21	Ballroom	5	3
Warsaw: Day 2	Barbara Zielińska	23	Salsa/Contemporary	5	3
Warsaw: Day 2	Łukasz Słaniewski	26	Contemporary	5	3
Warsaw: Day 2	Roksana Saniuk	23	Hip-Hop	5	3
Total number of tickets to Buenos Aires					36

^1These dancers were shown only in youcandance.tvn.pl website extras. ^2These dancers weren't shown anywhere. ^3These dancers earned the tickets after choreography round.

=== Returning Dancers ===
This season there were some returning dancers, who were trying their chances last seasons.

Dancer	Age	Style	Previous attempt(s)	This season Result
Paulina Bagińska	18	Hip-Hop	Season 1; Audition	Audition (Choreography round)
Marcin Konopacki	23	Hip-Hop	Season 1; Top 50	Audition
Żaneta Majcher	18	Jazz	Season 1; Top 50	Top 10
Ewa Mędrzycka	21	Jazz	Season 1; Audition	Top 36
Damian Czeszewski	23	Ballroom	Season 1; Final Choreography round	Audition
Rafał Szostok	22	Breakdance	Season 1; Audition (Choreography round)	Top 36

== Choreography Camp (Buenos Aires) week ==
Judges: Agustin Egurrola, Weronika Marczuk-Pazura, Michał Piróg

Task/style	Music	Choreographer(s)
Hip-Hop	No One – Alicia Keys	Viet Dang
Salsa	Unknown	Brian van der Kust & Joanna Szokalska
Jazz	Unknown	Piotr Jagielski
Argentine tango	Unknown	Nancy Louzan & Damian Essel
Final Choreography	Mirror – Ne-Yo	Marta Kudelka

== Top 16 Contestants ==
=== Women ===
Finalist	Age	Home Town	Dance Specialty	Elimination date
Katarzyna Kubalska	19	Białystok	Ballet/Contemporary	Runner up
Anna Radomska	24	Zielona Góra	Ballroom	28 May 2008
Justyna Białowąs	21	Wrocław	Ballroom	21 May 2008
Aneta Gąsiewicz	20	Warsaw	Dancehall	14 May 2008
Żaneta Majcher	18	Łańcut	Jazz	7 May 2008
Katarzyna "Milla" Kordzińska	25	Warsaw	Jazz/Broadway	16 April 2008; Re-entered competition (21 April 2008); 30 April 2008
Roksana Saniuk	23	Łódź	Hip Hop	23 April 2008
Natalia Wojdak	21	Gdańsk	Ballroom	Withdrew; 21 April 2008

=== Men ===
Finalist	Age	Home Town	Dance Specialty	Elimination date
Artur Cieciórski	30	Toruń	Hip-Hop/Disco Freestyle	Winner
Kryspin Hermański	26	Chorzów	Ballet/Contemporary	5 June 2008
Gieorgij Puchalski	19	Warsaw	Contemporary	21 May 2008
Kamil Guzy	18	Piekary Śląskie	Ballet/Contemporary	14 May 2008
Patryk Rożniecki	19	Porajów	Hip Hop/New Style	7 May 2008
Łukasz Słaniewski	26	Warsaw	Salsa/Modern jazz	30 April 2008
Kamil "Santi" Węsierski	18	Rumia	Jazz	23 April 2008
Filip Wala	20	Krotoszyn	Ballroom	16 April 2008

== Elimination chart ==
Key:
Female	Male	Bottom 3 Couples	Eliminated	Did not perform due to injury	Withdrew	Immunity and Winner	Runner-up

	Week:	04/16	04/23	04/30	05/07	05/14	05/21	05/28	06/05
	Contestant	Result							
Final Top 3	Artur Ciecórski		Btm 3			Btm 3			WINNER
Final Top 3	Katarzyna Kubalska				Btm 3				Runner-up
Final Top 3	Kryspin Hermañski					Btm 3			Elim
Top 4	Anna Radomska			Btm 3		Btm 3		Elim	
Top 6	Gieorgij Puchalski	SAFE	Btm 3	Btm 3	Btm 3		Elim		
Top 6	Justyna Białowąs			Btm 3		Btm 3	Elim		
Top 8	Kamil Guzy			Btm 3	Btm 3	Elim			
Top 8	Aneta Gąsiewicz	Btm 3	Btm 3		Btm 3	Elim			
Top 10	Patryk Rożniecki	Btm 3	Btm 3		Elim				
Top 10	Żaneta Majcher	SAFE	Btm 3		Elim				
Top 12	Łukasz Słaniewski	Btm 3		Elim					
Top 12	Katarzyna "Milla" Kordzińska	~~Elim~~		Elim					
Top 14	Kamil "Santi" Węsierski	Injury	Elim						
Top 14	Roksana Saniuk		Elim						
Top 14	Natalia Wojdak	Btm 3	WD						
Top 16	Filip Wala	Elim							

== Performance nights ==
=== Week 1: Top 16 Showcase (9 April 2008) ===
Group Performance: Ramalama (Bang, Bang) — Róisín Murphy
Musical Guest: Pinnawela – You Can Dance

Group	Style	Music	Choreographer(s)
Aneta Gąsiewicz; Roksana Saniuk; Artur Ciecórski; Patryk Rożniecki; Gieorgij Puchalski	Hip-hop	Feedback – Janet Jackson	David Hernandez Sanchez
Katarzyna "Milla" Kordzińska; Katarzyna Kubalska; Żaneta Majcher; Kamil Guzy; Kamil "Santi" Węsierski	Jazz	Hot – Avril Lavigne	Piotr Jagielski
Justyna Białowąs; Anna Radomska; Natalia Wojdak; Łukasz Słaniewski; Kryspin Hermański; Filip Wala	Salsa	Shake Your Pom Pom — Missy Elliott	Brian van der Kust

- Top 16's solos:

Dancer	Style	Music	Result
Aneta Gąsiewicz	Dance hall	Let's Get Rowdy — Fatman Scoop	
Kamil Guzy	Contemporary	Jak Anioła Głos — Feel	
Natalia Wojdak	Samba	Take Control — Ameriie	
Kamil Węsierski	Jazz	Believe in Me — Lenny Kravitz	
Żaneta Majcher	Jazz	Listen — Beyoncé	Safe^{#}
Łukasz Słaniewski	Modern	Song 2 — Blur	
Katarzyna Kubalska	Contemporary	I Like It Like That — Tito Nieves	
Kryspin Hermański	Contemporary	Headlock — Imogen Heap	
Anna Radomska	Tango/Jive	Straight to...number one — Touch and Go	
Artur Cieciórski	Hip-Hop	Real Man — Lexington Bridge	
Justyna Białowąs	Samba	L'ombelico del mondo – Jiovanotti	
Filip Wala	Jive	Reet Petite — Jackie Wilson	
Roksana Saniuk	Hip-Hop	Whatever U Like — Nicole Scherzinger	
Patryk Rożniecki	Hip-Hop	The Walk — Imogen Heap	
Katarzyna "Milla" Kordzińska	Broadway	Feeling Good — Michael Bublé	
Gieorgij Puchalski	Jazz	You and Me — Lifehouse	Safe^{#}

^{#} After Voting these dancers will be safe in next week

=== Week 2: Top 16 (16 April 2008) ===
Group Performance: So Much Better—Janet Jackson/Let Me Think About It – Ida Corr

Couple	Style	Music	Choreographer(s)	Results
Natalia Wojdak; Filip Wala	Samba	Rich Girl – Gwen Stefani	Arkadiusz Pavlovic	Bottom 3
Aneta Gąsiewicz; Patryk Rożniecki	Hip-Hop (Dance hall)	When You Gonna (Give It Up To Me) – Sean Paul ft. Keyshia Cole	Anna "Youya" Jujka	Bottom 3
Katarzyna Kordzińska; Łukasz Słaniewski	Modern	Hurt – Christina Aguilera	Katarzyna Kizor	Bottom 3
Katarzyna Kubalska; Kamil Guzy	Ballet	Hedonism (Just Because You Feel Good) – Skunk Anansie	Zofia Rudnicka	Safe
Roksana Saniuk; Kryspin Hermański	Hip-Hop	With You – Chris Brown	Viet Dang	Safe
Justyna Białowąs; Sasza Latuszkin^{#}	Cha-Cha	Like this, like that – Se Sa	Joanna Szokalska	Safe
Żaneta Majcher; Gieorgij Puchalski	Jazz	Bleeding Love—Leona Lewis	Piotr Jagielski	Safe

- Bottom 3 Couples solos:

Dancer	Style	Music	Result
Natalia Wojdak	Jive	Straight to...number One — Touch and Go	Safe
Filip Wala	Cha-Cha	Technologic — Daft Punk	Eliminated
Aneta Gąsiewicz	Hip-Hop	Rockstar — Prima J	Safe
Patryk Rożniecki	Hip-Hop	Speakerphone — Kylie Minogue	Safe
Katarzyna "Milla" Kordzińska	Hip-Hop	La Boulette – Diam's	Eliminated
Łukasz Słaniewski	Locking	Get Up Offa That Thing — James Brown	Safe

- Eliminated:
  - Katarzyna Kordzińska
  - Filip Wala
- New partners:
  - None. New partners are randomly assigned each week

^{#} Kamil "Santi" Węsierski did not perform due to injury, in next episode he has to perform his solo in bottom. He was substituted by choreographer's assistant – Szasza Latuszkin

=== Week 3: Top 12 (30 April 2008) ===
Group Performance: Beat It—Michael Jackson ft. Fergie

Couple	Style	Music	Choreographer(s)	Results
Justyna Białowąs; Łukasz Słaniewski	Modern Jazz	Soulmate – Natasha Bedingfield	Elżbieta Pańtak	Safe
Anna Radomska; Kamil "Santi" Węsierski	Hip-Hop	Low – Flo Rida ft. T-Pain	Anna "Yoyua" Jujka	Radomska Safe; Węsierski Eliminated
Katarzyna "Milla" Kordzińska; Kryspin Hermański	Jazz	It's oh so quiet – Björk	Jacek Wazelin	Safe
Katarzyna Kubalska; Kamil Guzy	Jive	369 – Cupid ft. B.o.B	Joanna Szokalska	Bottom 3
Aneta Gąsiewicz; Patryk Rożniecki	Pop	Maneater – Nelly Furtado	Katarzyna Kizor	Bottom 3
Żaneta Majcher; Gieorgij Puchalski	Viennese Waltz	Wreckless Love – Alicia Keys	Adam Król	Bottom 3
Roksana Saniuk; Artur Ciecórski	Jazz	Faint – Linkin Park	Piotr Jagielski	Saniuk Eliminated

- Bottom 3 Couples solos:

Dancer	Style	Music	Result
Aneta Gąsiewicz	Krump	Wall to Wall — Chris Brown	Safe
Patryk Rożniecki	Hip-Hop	4 Minutes — Madonna ft. Justin Timberlake	Safe
Żaneta Majcher	Jazz	Stop – Sam Brown	Safe
Gieorgij Puchalski	Broadway	Ha Ha Ha — Kevin Michael	Safe
Roksana Saniuk	Hip-Hop	Radar – Britney Spears	Eliminated
Artur Ciecórski	Hip-hop	Wadsyname (instrumental) — Nelly	Safe
Kamil "Santi" Węsierski	Contemporary	Dream Within a Dream — Britney Spears	Eliminated

- Eliminated:
  - Roksana Saniuk
  - Kamil "Santi" Węsierski

=== Week 4: Top 12 (7 May 2008) ===
Guest Judge: Iza Miko
Group Performance: Numb/Encore—Linkin Park & Jay-Z

Couple	Style	Music	Choreographer(s)	Results
Żaneta Majcher; Artur Ciecórski	Modern Jazz	Behind Blue Eyes – Limp Bizkit	Katarzyna Kizor	Safe
Anna Radomska; Gieorgij Puchalski	Hip-hop	I've Got What You Need – Afromental	Anna "Youya" Jujka	Bottom 3
Katarzyna Kubalska; Patryk Rożniecki	Pop	2 Hearts — Kylie Minogue	Katarzyna Kizior	Safe
Katarzyna "Milla" Kordzińska; Łukasz Słaniewski	Jazz	Stop & Stare – OneRepublic	Piotr Jagielski	Both Eliminated
Justyna Bialowąs; Kamil Guzy	Salsa	Work – Kelly Rowland	Konrad Dąbski; Joanna Dąbska	Bottom 3
Aneta Gąsiewicz; Kryspin Hermański	Rock & Roll	Are You Gonna Be My Girl – Jet	Joanna Szokalska	Safe

- Bottom 3 Couples solos:

Dancer	Style	Music	Result
Anna Radomska	Samba	Conga – Gloria Estefan	Safe
Gieorgij Puchalski	Jazz	A Song For You — Michael Bublé	Safe
Katarzyna "Milla" Kordzińska	Hip-hop	Block Rocin Beats – Chemical Brothers	Eliminated
Łukasz Słaniewski	Salsa	La Rumba Se Acabo – New Swing Sextet	Eliminated
Justyna Białowąs	Cha-Cha	And The Living Is Easy – The Guts	Eliminated
Kamil Guzy	Ballet	I Wanna Love You Forever — Jessica Simpson	Safe

- Eliminated:
  - Katarzyna "Milla" Kordzińska
  - Łukasz Słaniewski

=== Week 5: Top 10 (14 May 2008) ===
Group Performance: Jump Around—House of Pain/Good Vibrations – Marky Mark
Musical Guest: Jak Anioła Głos – Feel (With Top 10)

Couple	Style	Music	Choreographer(s)	Results
Justyna Białowąs; Artur Cieciórski	Pop	Scream – Timbaland	David Hernandez Sanchez	Safe
Katarzyna Kubalska; Kamil Guzy	Tango	You Know I am Not Good – Amy Winehouse	Adam Król	Bottom 3
Żaneta Majcher; Patryk Rożniecki	Contemporary	Bubbly – Colbie Caillat	Andrzej Morawiec	Both Eliminated
Aneta Gąsiewicz; Gieorgij Puchalski	Hip-hop	Ching-a-Ling – Missy Elliott	Krzysztof Mazur	Bottom
Anna Radomska; Kryspin Hermański	Samba	Take Control – Ameriie	Joanna Szokalska	Safe

- Bottom 3 Couples solos:

Dancer	Style	Music	Result
Katarzyna Kubalska	Contemporary	Queen of the Damned – Korn ft. Slipknot	Safe
Kamil Guzy	Contemporary	End of all Hope – Nightwish	Safe
Żaneta Majcher	Jazz	Lost – Anouk	Eliminated
Patryk Rożniecki	Hip-hop	Rock with U — Janet Jackson	Eliminated
Aneta Gąsiewicz	Hip hop	That's Right – Ciara	Safe
Gieorgij Puchalski	Jazz	In The End – Linkin Park	Safe

- Eliminated*:
  - Żaneta Majcher
  - Patryk Rożniecki

=== Week 6: Top 8 (21 May 2008) ===
Group Performance: Free Your Mind— En Vogue

- Couple dances:

Couple	Style	Music	Choreographer(s)	Result
Aneta Gąsiewicz; Kamil Guzy	House	Come on Girl — Taio Cruz	Justyna Lichacy	Both Eliminated
Aneta Gąsiewicz; Kamil Guzy	Afro Jazz	Wanna Be Starting Something — Michael Jackson ft. Akon	Eva Nitsch	Both Eliminated
Katarzyna Kubalska; Gieorgij Puchalski	Contemporary	Mercy – Duffy	David Hernandez Sanchez	Safe
Katarzyna Kubalska; Gieorgij Puchalski	Paso Doble	Conquest — The White Stripes	Joanna Szokalska	Safe
Justyna Białowąs; Kryspin Hermański	Salsa	Fever – La Lupe	Mariusz Olszewski	Bottom 3
Justyna Białowąs; Kryspin Hermański	Modern Jazz	Addicted—Kelly Clarkson	Katarzyna Kizior	Bottom 3
Anna Radomska; Artur Cieciórski	Hip-Hop	Release – Timbaland	Mariusz Olszewski	Bottom 3
Anna Radomska; Artur Cieciórski	Broadway	Beware of the Dog — Jamelia	Jacek Wazelin	Bottom 3

- Bottom 3 Couples solos:

Dancer	Style	Music	Result
Anna Radomska		You are The One That I Love – Grace soundtrack	Safe
Artur Cieciórski	Hip-Hop/Breakdance	Pussy Pop — Mystikal	Safe
Justyna Białowąs	Cha-Cha	Women Like a Man —Damien Rice	Safe
Kryspin Hermański	Jazz	Step Up – Samantha Jade	Safe

- Eliminated:
  - Aneta Gąsiewicz
  - Kamil Guzy

=== Week 7: Top 6 (28 May 2008) ===
Group Performance: The Anthem— Pitbull ft. Lil Jon

- Couple dances:

Couple	Style	Music	Choreographer(s)	Result
Katarzyna Kubalska; Kryspin Hermański	Contemporary	Going Under — Evanescence	Mariusz Olszewski	Safe
Katarzyna Kubalska; Kryspin Hermański	Hip-Hop	Ayo Technology — 50 Cent ft. Justin Timberlake	Justyna Lichacy	Safe
Justyna Białowąs; Artur Cieciórski	Pop	Hot Stuff – Craig David	Krzysztof "Soda" Rudziński	Białowąs Eliminated
Justyna Białowąs; Artur Cieciórski	Rock & Roll	Hit Me Up — Gia Farrell	Joanna Szokalska	Białowąs Eliminated
Anna Radomska; Gieorgij Puchalski	Latin	Who Let The Dogs Out – Baha Men	Joanna Szokalska	Puchalski Eliminated
Anna Radomska; Gieorgij Puchalski	Jazz	U + Ur Hand – Pink	Piotr Jagielski	Puchalski Eliminated

- Top 6's solos:

Dancer	Style	Music	Result
Katarzyna Kubalska	Contemporary	Gabriel – Lamb	Safe
Kryspin Hermański	Ballet	Do Kołyski – Dżem	Safe
Justyna Białowąs	Broadway	Love and Peace or Else — U2	Eliminated
Artur Cieciórski	Hip Hop	Believe in Me — Lenny Kravitz	Safe
Anna Radomska	Cha-Cha	Smooth Criminal —Michael Jackson	Safe
Gieorgij Puchalski	Modern	I Don't Wanna Miss a Thing – Aerosmith	Eliminated

- Eliminated:
  - Justyna Białowąs
  - Gieorgij Puchalski

=== Week 8: Semi-finale – Top 4 (28 May 2008) ===
On this episode weren't Group Performance

Couple	Style	Music	Choreographer(s)	Results
Katarzyna Kubalska; Artur Cieciórski	Hip-hop	Whine Up – Kat Deluna	Justyna Lichacy	Safe
Anna Radomska; Kryspin Hermański	Jazz	You Give Me Something—James Morrison	Paweł Michno	Radomska Eliminated
Anna Radomska; Artur Cieciórski	Jive	The Best Damn Thing — Avril Lavigne	Joanna Szokalska	Radomska Eliminated
Katarzyna Kubalska; Kryspin Hermański	Argentine Tango	Już Nigdy – Mieczysław Fogg & Mika Urbaniak	Piotr Wożniak	Safe
Anna Radomska; Katarzyna Kubalska	Pop	He's a Dream – Shandi	Katarzyna Kizor	Radomska Eliminated
Artur Cieciórski; Kryspin Hermański	Locking	Seed – The Roots	Krzysztof Mazur	Safe

- Top 4's solos:

Dancer	Style	Music	Result
Anna Radomska	Rumba	Iris – Goo Goo Dolls	Eliminated
Kryspin Hermański	Jazz	Fear of The Dark — Iron Maiden	Safe
Katarzyna Kubalska	Ballet	Maestro – Hans Zimmer	Safe
Artur Cieciórski	Hip-Hop/Breakdance	Hit the Floor – Twista ft. Pitbull	Safe

- Eliminated:
  - Anna Radomska

=== Week 9: Finale – Top 3 (5 June 2008) ===
Group Performance: Rhythm of the Night – Valery (Top 16)
Special Performance: You Can Dance – Pinnawela (Top 3)
Guest Performance: Good Luck – Basement Jaxx (Top 16 and first season winner Maciej Florek)

Couple	Style	Music	Choreographer(s)
Katarzyna Kubalska; Kryspin Hermański	Jazz	Better in Time – Leona Lewis	Piotr Jagielski
Artur Cieciórski; Kryspin Hermański	Hip-Hop	Party People—Nelly ft. Fergie	Wojciech Kuczyński
Katarzyna Kubalska; Artur Cieciórski	Pop	Kiss — Prince	David Hernandez Sanchez

- Top 10 Performances of season:

Place	Couple/Person	Style	Show
10	Anna Radomska & Artur Ciecórski	Jive	Top 4
9	Gieorgij Puchalski	Contemporary	Top 6
8	Kamil Guzy	Contemporary	Top 10
7	Katarzyna "Milla" Kordzińska & Kryspin Hermański	Broadway	Top 14
6	Żaneta Majcher & Artur Ciecórski	Modern Jazz	Top 12
5	Katarzyna Kubalska & Gieorgij Puchalski	Paso Doble	Top 8
4	Justyna Białowąs & Artur Ciecórski	Pop	Top 6
3	Justyna Białowąs & Kryspin Hermański	Modern Jazz	Top 8
2	Katarzyna Kubalska & Kryspin Hermański	Contemporary	Top 6
1	Żaneta Majcher & Gieorgij Puchalski	Jazz	Top 16

- Top 3's solos:

Dancer	Style	Music	Result
Kryspin Hermański	Ballet	Show Must Go On – Queen	3rd place
Katarzyna Kubalska	Contemporary	The Last Sunrise (Dusk Mix) — Aiden	Runner-up
Artur Cieciórski	Hip-Hop	Remember The Name – Fort Minor	Winner

- Results:
  - Winner: Artur Cieciórski
  - Runner-up: Katarzyna Kubalska
  - 3rd place: Kryspin Hermański

== First for any So You Think You Can Dance series ==
- First live show in season was the first ever live episode without elimination. The dancers performed only solos and 4 group dances.

== First for You Can Dance – Po Prostu Tańcz! ==
- First episode was for the first time showdown episode.
- From this season 36 dancers went on choreography camp instead of season's 1 50.
- First ever ballet routine performed by couple.

== Rating Figures ==
Episode	Date	Official rating 4+	Share 4+	Share 16–39
Auditions 1	5 March 2008	3,077,507	22.64%	26.38%
Auditions 2	12 March 2008	3,527,331	27.57%	31.66%
Auditions 3	19 March 2008	3,685,660	28.48%	31.05%
Auditions 4 Buenos Aires Week 1	26 March 2008	2,965,419	21.78%	24.59%
Buenos Aires Week 2	2 April 2008	3,168,673	23.10%	26.21%
Live Show Top 16	9 April 2008	3,267,513	27.83%	32.02%
Live Show Top 16	16 April 2008	3,135,031	27.56%	32.20%
Live Show Top 14	23 April 2008	2,949,739	24.37%	26.65%
Live Show Top 12	30 April 2008	2,616,401	21.40%	24.53%
Live Show Top 10	7 May 2008	2,692,353	23.16%	25.24%
Live Show Top 8	14 May 2008	2,741,304	23.52%	24.97%
Live Show Top 6	21 May 2008	2,525,034	18.90%	19.20%
Live Show Top 4	28 May 2008	3,020,502	26.30%	28.58%
The Final Top 3	5 June 2008	3,196,605	26.43%	30.35%
Average	2008	2,999,123	24.40%	27.23%
