= TVN HD =

Polish television channel

- Country: Poland

Programming
- Picture format: 1080i (HDTV) 16:9

Ownership
- Owner: TVN Group

History
- Launched: August 28, 2007

Links
- Website: tvn.pl

TVN HD+1
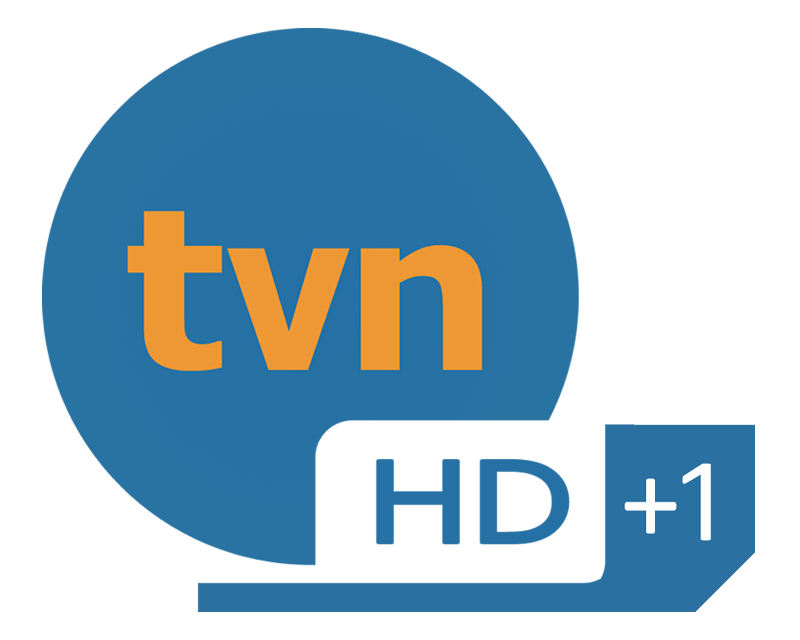
- Country: Poland

Programming
- Picture format: 1080i (HDTV) 16:9

Ownership
- Owner: TVN Group

History
- Launched: May 1, 2010

Links
- Website: tvn.pl

TVN HD was launched on August 28, 2007 it became available on digital platform n which also belongs to ITI Group The channel broadcasts TVN's programmes in 1080i and 16:9. On 1 May 2010, a timeshift channel of TVN HD was made called TVN HD+1.

== TVN HD+1 ==
On May 1, 2010 ITI Group launched a timeshift channel which is called TVN HD+1 and broadcasts TVN's programmes in 1080i and 16:9 with a one-hour delay time.

TVN HD+1 was closed on January 31, 2012.

== See also ==
- TVN
