= Geneviève Dorion-Coupal =

Canadian dancer

Geneviève Dorion-Coupal is a dancer, choreographer and artistic director native to Quebec, Canada. She has contributed to musicals, shows, theatre plays, and television programs. She has also made diverse incursions into the cinema and advertising.

== Musical and theatrical plays ==
She was part of the artistic direction of The Man in Black, a musical tribute to Johnny Cash, that was primarily presented at the Capitol de Québec and that toured Canada afterwards. She is also the choreographer of Love, a production of the Cirque du Soleil, inspired by the work of The Beatles, but also of Les Misérables, Generation Motown, Night Fever, Dalida and Chicago.

== Special events ==
She was in charge of the Québécois show at the Opening Night of the Vancouver Winter Olympics 2010.

== Broadcast television ==
The public has seen her work in the Québécois reality show Star Académie and on the Polish version of the show So You Think You Can Dance.
