= You Can Dance – Po Prostu Tańcz! season 3 =

You Can Dance – Po Prostu Tańcz!
- Season 3
- Hosted by: Kinga Rusin
- Judges: Agustin Egurrola; Michał Piróg; Weronika Marczuk-Pazura
- Winner: Wioletta Fiuk
- Runner-up: Gabriel Piotrowski

Release
- Original network: TVN
- Original release: September 3 – December 3, 2008

Season chronology
- ← Previous; Season 2 Next → Season 4

The first third season of You Can Dance – Po prostu Tańcz. The dancers compete to win PLN 100,000 and a 3-month scholarship in dance school Broadway Dance Center, but first they have to go through auditions. Later, 36 contestants do the workshops abroad – this season in Barcelona, Spain. This seasons on choreography camp special guest choreographer was Brian Friedman. From sixteen people, two dancers are eliminated in each episode (In the semi-final episode there was one contestant eliminated). In every episode couples are randomly picked. The final episode that features the top three contestants. The show is hosted by Kinga Rusin. The judges are Agustin Egurrola, Michał Piróg and Weronika Marczuk-Pazura. It premiered on 3 September 2008. Wioletta Fiuk was announced as the winner on 3 December 2008.

== Changes from Previous season ==
- During choreography camp every dancer had to participate in Final Choreography Round with Special Guest Choreographer. Right after group danced the results were announced by judges. This solution is used in every next season.
- In Final episode there were two rounds: In first only two left men were competing. The winner joined the best female dancer in final round.

== Auditions ==
Season Background Song: Destination Calabria – Alex Gaudino
Open auditions for this season were held in the following locations:

- Szczecin
- Kraków
- Wrocław
- Warsaw

The song during Sneek Peeks at the end of the episode is Just Lose It – Eminem

=== Top 36 dancers ===
During the auditions judges picked 36 dancers. These dancers were taking part in choreography camp in Barcelona, Spain.

City	Dancer	Age	Style	Number of dancers	Number of top 16 dancers
Szczecin	Gabriel Piotrowski	18	Hip-Hop	5	4
Szczecin	Izabela Orzełowska	18	Contemporary	5	4
Szczecin	Michał Pawłowski	20	Hip-Hop	5	4
Szczecin	Agnieszka Gołofit	19	Hip-Hop	5	4
Szczecin	Tomasz Prządka	19	Ballroom/Hip-Hop	5	4
Kraków	Agata Wiedro	20	Ballroom	6	3
Kraków	Wioletta Fiuk	22	Contemporary	6	3
Kraków	Paulina Jaksim^{3}	19	Ballet/Jazz	6	3
Kraków	Anita Florczak^{1}	20	Ballroom	6	3
Kraków	Aneta Bałoń^{1}		Ballroom	6	3
Kraków	Adrianna Piechówka	16	Ballroom	6	3
Wrocław	Justyna Banasiak	22	Contemporary	8	6
Wrocław	Justyna Świerczyńska	22	Erotic dance	8	6
Wrocław	Karol Niecikowski	24	Hip-Hop	8	6
Wrocław	Adrianna Kawecka	16	Hip-Hop	8	6
Wrocław	Klaudia Bryzek	22	Ballet/Contemporary	8	6
Wrocław	Barbara Derkowska	24	Hip-Hop/House	8	6
Wrocław	Marcin Mrożiński	20	Hip-Hop/Dancehhall/Krump/Wacking/Contemporary	8	6
Wrocław	Katarzyna Waligóra	26	Jazz	8	6
Warsaw	Paweł Kulik^{3}	23	Ballroom	17	3
Warsaw	Szymon Mazur	24	Ballet	17	3
Warsaw	Błażej Górski	19	Hip-Hop	17	3
Warsaw	Robert Magiera	21	Ballroom	17	3
Warsaw	Klaudia Śnios	20	Contemporary	17	3
Warsaw	Kacper Matuszewski	24	Krump	17	3
Warsaw	Mieszko Wiśniewski	18	Hip-Hop/Jazz	17	3
Warsaw	Jakub Mędrzycki	17	Contemporary	17	3
Warsaw	Marcin Kowalski^{2}	24	Breakdance	17	3
Warsaw	Jacek Suchecki^{1}		Contemporary	17	3
Warsaw	Iwona Tchórzewska^{1}		Contemporary	17	3
Warsaw	Mariusz Swatek^{1}		Breakdance	17	3
Warsaw	Tomasz Jóżwiak^{1}		Ballroom	17	3
Warsaw	Agnieszka Miś^{1}		Hip-Hop	17	3
Warsaw	Maciej Pela^{1}		Hip-Hop	17	3
Warsaw	Kamila Ganclarska^{2}		Jazz	17	3
Warsaw	Kamil Czarnecki^{2}	25	Jazz	17	3
Total number of tickets to Barcelona					36

^1These dancers were shown only in youcandance.tvn.pl website extras. ^2These dancers weren't shown anywhere. ^3These dancers earned the tickets after choreography round.

=== Returning Dancers ===
This season there were some returning dancers, who were trying their chances last seasons.

Dancer	Age	Style	Previous attempt(s)	This season Result
Michał Pawłowski	20	Hip-Hop	Season 2; Audition	Top 6
Wioletta Fiuk	22	Contemporary	Season 1; Top 50	Winner
Karol Niecikowski	24	Hip-Hop	Season 1; Final Choreography round (Dance for live)	Top 14
Marcin Mrożiński	20	Hip-Hop/Dancehhall/Krump/Wacking/Contemporary	Season 2; Audition	3rd place
Barbara Derkowska	24	Hip-Hop/House	Season 1; Top 50	Top 16
Katarzyna Waligóra	26	Jazz	Season 1; Top 50	Final Choreography round (Dance for live)
Marcin Kowalski	24	Breakdance	Season 2; Audition	Top 36
Jacek Suchecki		Contemporary	Season 1; Top 50	Top 36

== Choreography Camp (Barcelona) week ==
Judges: Agustin Egurrola, Weronika Marczuk-Pazura, Michał Piróg

Task/style	Music	Choreographer(s)
Hip-Hop	Backyard Betty – Spank Rock	Filip Czeszyk
Salsa	Chera Mia – David Calzado Y Su Charranga Habanera	Jorge Camaguay & Joanna Szokalska
Modern Jazz	REV 22:20 – Puscifer	Katarzyna Kizior
Pop	2 Nite – Janet Jackson	David Hernandez Sanchez
Flamenco	At The Top of Cerro De Polomares – Estrella Morente	Necho & La Tani
Final Choreography	Closer – Ne-Yo	Brian Friedman

=== Eliminations during Choreography Camp ===
- Dancers were practising choreographies during first three days of the Camp. Then there were no cuts, judges gave some dancers, who didn't handle the choreographies well yellow cards, second yellow equals red card.
- After rehearsals contestants performed only in chosen by choreographer style, then judges made cuts.
- After these cuts remaining contestants moved to Final Choreography round with special guest star Brian Friedman

Cuts after first round: Szymon Mazur, Iwona Tchórzewska, Aneta Bałoń, Agata Wiedro, Mariusz Swatek, Mieszko Wiśniewski, Jolanta Świerczyńska, Maciej Pela, Marcin Kowalski, Kamila Ganclarska, Cuts after Hip-Hop: Maciej Kuchta.
Cuts after Final Choreography round: Jacek Suchecki, Robert Magiera, Tomasz Jóżwiak, Agnieszka Miś, Paweł Kulik, Klaudia Śnios, Agnieszka Gołofit.
Cuts after dancing for live: Kacper Matuszewski, Katarzyna Waligóra, Adrianna Piechówka.

== Top 16 Contestants ==
=== Women ===
Finalist	Age	Home Town	Dance Specialty	Elimination date
Wioletta Fiuk	22	Siedlce	Contemporary	Winner
Adrianna Kawecka	16	Białystok	Hip-Hop	26 November 2008
Izabela Orzełowska	18	Siedlce	Contemporary	19 November 2008
Paulina Jaksim	19	Dosin	Ballet/Jazz	12 November 2008
Anita Florczak	20	Wrocław	Ballroom	5 November 2008
Justyna Banasiak	22	Szczecin	Jazz/Hip Hop	29 October 2008
Klaudia Bryzek	22	Warsaw	Ballet/Contemporary	22 November 2008
Barbara Derkowska	24	Zielona Góra	Hip-Hop/House	15 October 2008

=== Men ===
Finalist	Age	Home Town	Dance Specialty	Elimination date
Gabriel Piotrowski	18	Białystok	Hip-Hop	Runner-up
Marcin Mroziński	20	Zgierz	Hip-Hop/Dancehhall/Krump/Wacking/Contemporary	3 December 2008
Michał Pawłowski	20	Szczecin	Hip-Hop	19 November 2008
Jakub Mędrzycki	17	Siedlce	Contemporary	12 November 2008
Kamil Czarnecki	25	Kołobrzeg	Jazz	5 November 2008
Tomasz Prządka	19	Biała Podlaska	Ballroom	29 October 2008
Karol Niecikowski	24	Grajewo	Hip-Hop	22 October 2008
Błażej Górski	19	Białystok	Hip-Hop	15 October 2008

== Elimination chart ==
Key:
Female	Male	Bottom 3 Couples	Eliminated	Did not perform due to injury	Withdrew	Immunity and Winner	Runner-up

	Week:	10/15	10/22	10/29	11/05	11/12	11/19	11/26	12/03
	Contestant	Result							
Final Top 2	Wioletta Fiuk	SAFE			Btm 3	Btm 3			WINNER
Final Top 2	Gabriel Piotrowski	Btm 3	Btm 3						Runner-up
Top 3	Marcin Mroziński			Btm 3		Btm 3			Elim
Top 4	Adrianna Kawecka	Btm 3	Btm 3			Btm 3		Elim	
Top 6	Michał Pawłowski	Btm 3			Btm 3	Btm 3	Elim		
Top 6	Izabela Orzełowska				Btm 3		Elim		
Top 8	Jakub Mędrzycki	SAFE		Btm 3	Btm 3	Elim			
Top 8	Paulina Jaksim		Btm 3	Btm 3		Elim			
Top 10	Kamil Czarnecki		Btm 3		Elim				
Top 10	Anita Florczak			Btm 3	Elim				
Top 12	Tomasz Prządka			Elim					
Top 12	Justyna Banasiak	Btm 3		Elim					
Top 14	Karol Niecikowski		Elim						
Top 14	Klaudia Bryzek		Elim						
Top 16	Błażej Górski	Elim							
Top 16	Barbara Derkowska	Elim							

== Performance nights ==
=== Week 1: Top 16 Showcase (8 October 2008) ===
- Group Dance: Yeah Yeah — Bodyrox feat. Luciana/Walk These Dogs – DMX (House/Hip-Hop; Choreographer: Filip Czeszyk)
- Performances:

Group	Style	Music	Choreographer(s)
Paulina Jaksim; Klaudia Bryzek; Kamil Czarnecki; Gabriel Piotrowski	Jazz	Here Without You – 3 Doors Down	Piotr Jagielski
Anita Florczak; Justyna Banasiak; Michał Pawłowski; Tomasz Prządka	Salsa	Run The Show – Kat Deluna	Jhesus Aponte
Adrianna Kawecka; Barbara Derkowska; Błażej Górski; Karol Niecikowski	Hip-Hop	Don't Touch Me (Throw da Water on 'em) — Busta Rhymes	Justyna Lichacy
Wioletta Fiuk; Izabela Orzełowska; Jakub Mędrzycki; Marcin Mrożiński	Contemporary	End of the Century — Lulu Rouge	Thierry Verger

After Group performances Judges chose the best group and every person from this group had to perform their solo

- Solos:

Dancer	Style	Music	Result
Wioletta Fiuk	Contemporary	The Garden — Mirah	Safe^{#}
Jakub Mędrzycki	Contemporary	Hello — Lionel Richie	Safe^{#}
Izablea Orzełowska	Contemporary	Zasłoń Okno – Magda Sójka	
Marcin Mrożiński	Hip-Hop	Nu-Di-Ty — Kylie Minogue	

^{#}After Voting these dancers will be safe in next episode

=== Week 2: Top 16 (15 October 2008) ===
- Group Dance: Closer — Ne-Yo (Contemporary; Choreographer: Wojciech Mochiniej)
- Top 16 Couple Dances:

Couple	Style	Music	Choreographer(s)	Results
Adrianna Kawecka; Błażej Górski	Salsa/Hip-Hop	Salsaton MST – Remenea	Jhesus Aponte	Górski Eliminated
Anita Florczak; Tomasz Prządka	Quickstep	A Little Less Conversation remix – Elvis Presley	Maciej Zakliczyński	Safe
Wioletta Fiuk; Kamil Czarnecki	Jazz	We Are — Ana Johnsson	Piotr Jagielski	Safe
Barbara Derkowska; Michał Pawłowski	Cha-Cha-Cha	Oye Como Va — Celia Cruz	Jhesus Aponte	Derkowska Eliminated
Paulina Jaksim; Karol Nieckikowski	Hip-Hop	Because of You — Ne-Yo	Rafał "Roofi" Kamiński (season 1)	Safe
Izabela Orzełowska; Marcin Mrożiński	Contemporary	Take a Bow – Rihanna	Wojciech Mochniej	Safe
Klaudia Bryzek; Jakub Mędrzycki	Ballet	Nothing Else Matters — Metallica	Zofia Rudincka	Safe
Justyna Banasiak; Gabriel Piotrowski	Rock & Roll	Boom Boom Song – Big Head Todd & The Monsters	Joanna Szokalska; Paweł Przywina	Bottom 3

- Bottom 3 Couples solos:

Dancer	Style	Music	Result
Adrianna Kawecka	Hip-Hop	Cherry Bomb — Kylie Minogue	Safe
Błażej Górski	Hip-Hop	Swagg — Teyana Taylor	Eliminated
Barbara Derkowska	House	Where's Your Head At — Basement Jaxx	Eliminated
Michał Pawłowski	Hip-Hop	Yeah Yeah — Bodyrox ft. Luciana	Safe
Justyna Banasiak	Jazz	Hide and Seek – Imogen Heap	Safe
Gabriel Piotrowski	Hip-Hop	Strip Tease — Danity Kane	Safe

- Eliminated:
  - Barbara Derkowska
  - Błażej Górski

=== Week 3: Top 14 (22 October 2008) ===
- Group Dance: Disturbia — Rihanna (Hip-Hop; Choreographer: Anthony Kaye)
- Top 14 Couple dances:

Couple	Style	Music	Choreographer(s)	Results
Adrianna Kawecka; Kamil Czarnecki	Jive	I Kissed a Girl – Katy Perry	Joanna Szokalska	Bottom 3
Izabela Orzełowska; Jakub Mędrzycki	Afro Jazz	Church – T-Pain	Maria Foryś (season 1)	Safe
Klaudia Bryzek; Gabriel Piotrowski	Tango argentino	Tango de Roxxane — Moulin Rouge! soundtrack	Piotr Wożniak	Bryzek Eliminated
Paulina Jaksim; Karol Nieckiowski	Salsa	Que Hiciste — Jennifer Lopez	Konrad Dąbski; Joanna Dąbska	Niecikowski Eliminated
Anita Florczak; Michał Pawłowski	Modern Jazz	Gabriel — Lamb	Katarzyna Kizior	Safe
Wioletta Fiuk; Tomasz Prządka	Lyrical hip-hop	No Air – Jordin Sparks	Antony Kaye	Safe
Justyna Banasiak; Marcin Mrożński	Contemporary	Always – Bon Jovi	Mariusz Olszewski	Safe

- Bottom 3 Couples solos:

Dancer	Style	Music	Result
Adrianna Kawecka	Hip-Hop	You Know Me Better — Róisín Murphy	Safe
Kamil Czarnecki	Jazz	SexyBack – Justin Timberlake	Safe
Klaudia Bryzek	Contemporary	Angels – Robbie Williams	Eliminated
Gabriel Piotrowski	Hip-Hop	Creator – Santigold	Safe
Paulina Jaksim	Jazz	I Don't Wanna Miss a Thing – Aerosmith	Safe
Karol Niecikowski	Hip-Hop	Cherry – Lisa Shaw	Eliminated

- Eliminated:
  - Klaudia Bryzek
  - Karol Niecikowski

=== Week 4: Top 12 (29 October 2008) ===
- Group Performance: Just for Now — Imogen Heap (Modern Jazz; Choreographer: Katarzyna Kizior)
- Top 12 Couple dances:

Couple	Style	Music	Choreographer(s)	Results
Justyna Banasiak; Jakub Mędrzycki	Samba	I Fell in Love with the DJ – Che'Nelle	Mariusz Olszewski	Banasiak Eliminated
Izabela Orzełowska; Kamil Czarnecki	Pop	Just Dance – Lady Gaga	Eva Nitsch	Safe
Paulina Jaksim; Tomasz Prządka	Broadway	Big Spender — Sweet Charity	Jacek Wazelin	Prządka Eliminated
Anita Florczak; Marcin Mrożiński	Viennese Waltz	Iris — Goo Goo Dolls	Maciej Zakliczyński	Bottom 3
Adrianna Kawecka; Gabriel Piotrowski	Hip-hop	American Boy – Estelle ft. Kanye West	Eva Nitsch	Safe
Wioletta Fiuk; Michał Pawłowski	Modern Jazz	It's a Man's Man's Man's World – James Brown	Katarzyna Kizior	Safe

- Bottom 3 Couples solos:

Dancer	Style	Music	Result
Justyna Banasiak	Hip-Hop	I Got a Bottle – Trina ft. Missy Elliott	Eliminated
Jakub Mędrzycki	Contemporary	Is It Scary — Michael Jackson	Safe
Paulina Jaksim	Jazz	Listen — Beyoncé	Safe
Tomasz Prządka	Hip-hop	Stupid Shit – Girlicious	Eliminated
Anita Florcyak	Cha-Cha-Cha	Marina Gasolina – Bonde do Role	Safe
Marcin Mrożiński	Contemporary	Shithole Theme — Charlie Clouser	Safe

- Eliminated:
  - Justyna Banasiak
  - Tomasz Prządka

=== Week 5: Top 10 (5 November 2008) ===
- Group Performance: Womanizer — Britney Spears/Music For Twelve Sounds – Flykkiller (Contemporary; Choreographer: Michał Piróg)
- Top 14 Couple dances:

Couple	Style	Music	Choreographer(s)	Results
Anita Florczk; Jakub Mędrzycki	Jazz	Unfaithful – Rihanna	Piotr Jagielski	Florczak Eliminated
Adrianna Kawecka; Marcin Mrożiński	Krump	It's Okay (One Blood) – The Game	Regina Schweizer	Safe
Izabela Orzełowska; Michał Pawłowski	Foxtrot	Back to Black – Amy Winehouse	Maciej Zakliczyński	Bottom 3
Wioletta Fiuk; Rafał Czarnecki	Ragga Jam	Temperature – Sean Paul	Regina Schweizer	Czarnecki Eliminated
Paulina Jaksim; Gabriel Piotrowski	Contemporary	Stop – Sam Brown	Mariusz Olszewski	Safe

- Bottom 3 Couples solos:

Dancer	Style	Music	Result
Anita Florczak	Jazz	Lost – Anouk	Eliminated
Jakub Mędrzycki	Jazz	Oh! Darling — The Beatles	Safe
Izabela Orzełowska	Contemporary	Mama – Beth Hart	Safe
Michał Pawłowski	Hip-Hop/Contemporary	Different — Pendulum	Safe
Wioletta Fiuk	Contemporary	This Woman's Work – Maxwell	Safe
Kamil Czarnecki	Jazz	What's a Man to Do – Usher	Eliminated

- Eliminated*:
  - Anita Florczak
  - Kamil Czarnecki

=== Week 6: Top 8 (12 November 2008) ===
- Group Dances:

Dancers	Style	Music	Choreographer
Top 8	Ballroom	Juliana — Dark Latin Groove	Jhesus Aponte
Top 4 Male Dancers	Locking	It's Like That – Run DMC	Krzysztof Mazur
Top 4 Female Dancers	Modern	Another Way To Die – Alicia Keys	Katarzyna Kizior

- Top 8 Couple dances:

Couple	Style	Music	Choreographer(s)	Results
Izabela Orzełowska; Gabriel Piotowski	Modern	Hear Me – Kelly Clarkson	Katarzyna Kizior	Safe
Adrianna Kawecka; Marcin Mrożiński	Street Jazz	Catch Me if You Can – Matt Pokora	Natalia Madejczyk (season 1)	Bottom 3
Paulina Jaksim; Jakub Mędrzycki	Hip-Hop	Hit That – M.I.A	Anthony Kaye	Both Eliminated
Wioletta Fiuk; Marcin Mrożiński	Latin Jazz	Maria, Maria – Carlos Santana ft. Product G&B	Jhesus Aponte	Bottom 3

- Bottom 3 Couples solos:

Dancer	Style	Music	Result
Adrianna Kawecka	Hip-Hop	Hombre — M.I.A	Safe
Michał Pawłowski	Hip-Hop	Number One Fan – Dima Bilan	Safe
Paulina Jaksim	Afro Jazz	W'happy Mama – Zap Mama	Eliminated
Jakub Mędrzycki	Contemporary	No Bravery – James Blunt	Eliminated
Wioletta Fiuk	Jazz	Outta My Head – Ashlee Simpson	Safe
Marcin Mrożiński	Hip-Hop	Everyone Nose remix — N.E.R.D	Safe

- Eliminated:
  - Paulina Jaksim
  - Jakub Mędzycki

=== Week 7: Top 6 (19 November 2008) ===
- Group Performance: Shut Up and Let Me Go – The Ting Tings (Jazz; Choreographer: Piotr Jagielski)
- Top 6 Couple dances:

Couple	Style	Music	Choreographer(s)	Results
Izabela Orzełowska; Michał Pawłowski	Modern	If You Really Love Somebody – Alicia Keys ft. Lellow	Katarzyna Kizor	Both Eliminated
Wioletta Fiuk; Marcin Mrożiński	Latin	Paralyzer – Finger Eleven	Joanna Szokalska	Safe
Adrianna Kawecka; Gabriel Piotrowski	Jazz	Dancing — Elisa	Piotr Jagielski	Safe
Wioletta Fiuk; Michał Pawłowski	Dance hall	Get Ur Freak On — Missy Elliott ft. Nelly Furtado	Maria Foryś (season 1)	Pawłowski Eliminated
Izabela Orzełowska; Gabriel Piotrowski	Viennese Waltz	Dziwny Jest Ten Świat – Czesław Niemen	Maciej Zakliczyński	Orzełowska Eliminated
Adrianna Kawecka; Marcin Mrożiński	Hip-Hop	Elevator – Flo Rida ft. Timbaland	Rafał "Roofi" Kamiński (season 1)	Safe

- Top 6's solos:

Dancer	Style	Music	Result
Izabela Orzełowska	Contemporary	Red Football – Sinéad O'Connor	Eliminated
Michał Pawłowski	Hip-Hop/Locking	Here We Go remix — Timbaland ft. Dirtbag	Eliminated
Wioletta Fiuk	Contemporary	Wanted – Vanessa Carlton	Safe
Marcin Mrożiński	Hip-hop/Baltimore	Breakaway — Basement Jaxx	Safe
Adrianna Kawecka	Hip-Hop	Freakum Dress – Beyoncé	Safe
Gabriel Piotowski	Hip-Hop	Hussel – M.I.A	Safe

- Eliminated:
  - Izabela Orzełowska
  - Michał Pawłowski

=== Week 8: Semi-finale – Top 4 (26 November 2008) ===
- Group Performance: Mr. Sandman – The Chordettes (Hip-Hop); Choreographer: Rafał "Roofi" Kamiński (season 1)
- Guest Dancers: Maria Foryś, Natalia Madejczyk, Rafał Kamiński (season 1) – Chop Suey – System of a Down/Trust a Try – Janet Jackson
- Top 4 Couple dances:

Couple	Style	Music	Choreographer(s)	Results
Wioletta Fiuk; Marcin Mrożiński	Modern	Walk Away – Christina Aguilera	Katarzyna Kizor	Safe
Adrianna Kawecka; Gabriel Piotrowski	Hip-Hop	Xzibit	Justyna Lichacy	Kawecka Eliminated
Adrianna Kawecka; Wioletta Fiuk	Pop	Hot N Cold — Katy Perry	Natalia Madejczyk (season 1)	Kawecka Eliminated
Gabriel Piotrowski; Marcin Mrożiński	Modern Underground	This Is a New Shit — Marilyn Manson	Thierry Verger	Safe

- Top 4's solos:

Dancer	Style	Music	Result
Wioletta Fiuk	Contemporary	Bird Flu – M.I.A	Safe
Marcin Mrożiński	Contrast	What Sound — Lamb; Fantasy – Timbaland feat. Money	Safe
Adrianna Kawecka	Hip-Hop	We Belong Together – Mariah Carey	Eliminated
Gabriel Piotowski	Hip-Hop	War in Me – Kenna	Safe

- Eliminated:
  - Adrianna Kawecka

=== Week 9: Finale – Top 3 (2 December 2008) ===
- Group dances:

Dancers	Style	Music	Choreographer
Top 16	House/Krump	Flat Beat— Mr. Ozio/Pirates of Caribbean – J-Squad	Filip Czeszyk
Top 16 (Without Top 3)	Hip-Hop	Canned Heat – Jamiroquai	Rafał "Roofi" Kamiński (season 1)

- Top 3 Couple dances:

Couple	Style	Music	Choreographer(s)
Wioletta Fiuk; Gabriel Piotrowski	Pop	Whatever U Like – Nicole Scherzinger	Krzysztof "Soda" Rudziński
Wioletta Fiuk; Marcin Mrożiński	Jazz	When I Grow Up — Pussycat Dolls	Piotr Jagielski

- Top Male Dancers solos:

Dancer	Style	Music	Result
Gabriel Piotrowski	Hip-Hop	Breakdown – Wale/Diva – Beyoncé	Safe
Marcin Mrożiński	Hip-Hop/Dance hall	Machine Gun – Portishead/Diplo Rhythm – Diplo	Eliminated (3rd place)

- Final Performance

Couple	Style	Music	Choreographer(s)
Wioletta Fiuk; Gabriel Piotrowski	Hip-Hop	Go Hard or Go Home – E-40 ft. The Federation	Filip Czeszyk

- Top 2 solos:

Dancer	Style	Music	Result
Wioletta Fiuk	Contemporary	Scientist – Natasha Bedingfield	Winner
Gabriel Piotrowski	Hip-Hop/Jazz	Cosmic Journey – Solange Knowles	Runner-up

- Results:
  - Winner: Wioletta Fiuk
  - Runner-up: Gabriel Piotrowski
  - 3rd place: Marcin Mrożiński

== First for any So You Think You Can Dance series ==
- On top 10 Ragga Jam was danced for the first time in series, by couple Wioletta Fiuk & Kamil Czarnecki.

== First for You Can Dance – Po Prostu Tańcz! ==
- First ever Lyrical Hip-Hop performed by couple. Top 14 Wioletta Fiuk & Tomasz Prządka
- First ever Afro Jazz routine performed by couple. Top 14 Izabella Orzełowka & Jakub Mędrzycki
- First ever Krump routine performed by couple. Top 10 Adrianna Kawecka & Marcin Mrożiński
- First ever Ragga Jam routine performed in show. Top 10 Wioletta Fiuk & Kamil Czarnecki
- In finale there were two rounds. In first 2 males were competing to join top 2 along with the best female. It is controversial, because, that day there were two rounds of voting. After first the winner male votes weren't counted in next round, where he had to compete with top female dancer.

== Rating Figures ==
Episode	Date	Official rating 4+	Share 4+	Share 16–39
Auditions 1	3 September 2008	2,362,818	19.50%	20.00%
Auditions 2	10 September 2008	2,464,142	19.67%	21.30%
Auditions 3	17 September 2008	3,132,212	23.87%	27.39%
Barcelona Week 1	24 September 2008	2,905,715	23.31%	24.59%
Barcelona Week 2	1 October 2008	3,139,541	23.83%	26.19%
Live Show Top 16	8 October 2008	2,790,015	23.63%	25.51%
Live Show Top 16	15 October 2008	2,393,677	18.46%	20.30%
Live Show Top 14	22 October 2008	2,923,528	24.86%	26.98%
Live Show Top 12	29 October 2008	2,609,340	22.38%	24.06%
Live Show Top 10	5 November 2008	2,691,547	22.74%	24.74%
Live Show Top 8	12 November 2008	2,625,397	22.36%	24.19%
Live Show Top 6	19 November 2008	2,770,667	21.25%	24.68%
Live Show Top 4	26 November 2008	3,023,767	25.61%	26.74%
The Final 3	3 December 2008	2,970,536	24.16%	25.54%
Average	2008	2,765,374	22.57%	24.50%
