= You Can Dance – Po Prostu Tańcz! season 8 =

You Can Dance – Po Prostu Tańcz!
- Season 8
- Hosted by: Patricia Kazadi
- Judges: Agustin Egurrola; Michał Piróg; Kinga Rusin
- Winner: Mateusz Sobecko
- Runner-up: Natalia Gap

Release
- Original network: TVN
- Original release: 2 March – 1 June 2015

Season chronology
- ← Previous; Season 7 Next → Season 9

The eighth series of You Can Dance - Po prostu Tańcz! premiered on TVN on 2 March 2015. Agustin Egurrola, Michał Piróg and Kinga Rusin all returned as judges and Patricia Kazadi presents the show once again.

The auditions began on 5 January 2015 in Wrocław.

== Auditions ==
The auditions were held in five Polish cities throughout January 2015. The first day was an open audition, when the producers would choose auditionees, who would then perform in front of the judges and live audience. The filmed audition with judges took place on the following day. Footage from these auditions will be shown in first five episodes.

Air Date	Audition City	Audition Venue	Open audition	Filmed audition	Tickets
2 March 2015	Wrocław	Capitol Musical Theatre	5 January 2015	6 January 2015	8
9 March 2015; 16 March 2015^{1}	Kraków	ICE Kraków Congress Centre	7 January 2015	8 January 2015	11
16 March 2015	Poznań	Poznań Congress Centre	18 January 2015	19 January 2015	3
23 March 2015	Gdańsk	Gdańsk Shakespearean Theatre	11 January 2015	12 January 2015	11
30 March 2015	Warsaw	Torwar Hall	21 January 2015	22 January 2015	4^{2}
Total number of tickets					37^{2}

Notes

1. As the auditions in Kraków took more time than expected, some audition footage from Kraków was also featured in the episode broadcast on 16 March 2015.
2. Michał Piróg funded an extra ticket to Sevilla for Kasia Pursa after her audition in Warsaw, resulting in 37 dancers taking part in choreography camp, instead of usual 36.

=== Top 37 dancers ===
During the auditions judges picked 37 dancers. These dancers were taking part in choreography camp in Sevilla.

City	Dancer	Number of dancers	Number of top 14 dancers
Wrocław	Maksymilian Mazurek	8	3
Wrocław	Natalia Gap	8	3
Wrocław	Michał Kalcowski	8	3
Wrocław	Diana Król	8	3
Wrocław	Małgosia Kowalska	8	3
Wrocław	Włodek Kołobycz	8	3
Wrocław	Eugeniusz Salamon	8	3
Wrocław	Patryk Brdej	8	3
Kraków	Klaudia Sadło	11	5
Kraków	Evelina Stampa	11	5
Kraków	Michał Przybyła	11	5
Kraków	Małgorzata Rybińska	11	5
Kraków	Artur Golec	11	5
Kraków	Kacper Bożek	11	5
Kraków	Monika Radziszewska	11	5
Kraków	Mateusz Sobecko	11	5
Kraków	Michał Góral	11	5
Kraków	Martyna Andrzejczak	11	5
Kraków	Seweryn Siębrzuch	11	5
Poznań	Sara Janicka	3	2
Poznań	Dawid Rostkowski	3	2
Poznań	Mikołaj Strzyż	3	2
Gdańsk	Agata Stachowiak	11	3
Gdańsk	Paulina Woźniak	11	3
Gdańsk	Tomasz Węglewski	11	3
Gdańsk	Jowita Przystał	11	3
Gdańsk	Michał Daniluk	11	3
Gdańsk	Ernestina Papazyan	11	3
Gdańsk	Natalia Konarska	11	3
Gdańsk	Filip Drogoś	11	3
Gdańsk	Dawid Matlak	11	3
Gdańsk	Paulina Matysek	11	3
Gdańsk	Paulina Kubicka	11	3
Warsaw	Hubert Kozłowski	4	1
Warsaw	Piotr Szwarc	4	1
Warsaw	Kasia Pursa	4	1
Warsaw	Ewa Skonieczna	4	1

== Top 14 Contestants ==
=== Women ===
Finalist	Age	Home Town	Dance Specialty	Elimination date
Natalia Gap	17	Złotoryja	Contemporary	Runner-Up
Klaudia Sadło	18	Ostrowiec Świętokrzyski	Hip-Hop	18 May 2015 Re-entered competition (25 May 2015) 25 May 2015
Agata Stachowiak	16	Nakło nad Notecią	Contemporary	25 May 2015 - Withdrew
Sara Janicka	20	Poznań	Ballroom	11 May 2015
Paulina Kubicka	25	Warsaw	Hip-Hop	4 May 2015
Ernestina Papazyan	21	Yerevan, Armenia	Contemporary	27 April 2015
Monika Radziszewska	24	Białystok	Hip-Hop	20 April 2015

=== Men ===
Finalist	Age	Home Town	Dance Specialty	Elimination date
Mateusz Sobecko	22	Ruda Śląska	Hip-Hop	Winner
Michał Przybyła	22	Częstochowa	Contemporary	25 May 2015
Hubert Kozłowski	22	Warsaw	Breakdance	18 May 2015
Artur Golec	22	Gliwice	Hip-Hop	11 May 2015
Włodzimierz Kołobycz	19	Lviv, Ukraine	Contemporary	4 May 2015
Mikołaj Strzyż	22	Bielsko-Biała	Hip-Hop	27 April 2015
Patryk Brdej	21	Nowy Sącz	Hip-Hop	20 April 2015

== Elimination chart ==
Key:
Female	Male	Bottom 3 Couples	Eliminated	Withdrew	Winner	Runner-Up

	04/20	04/27	05/04	05/11	05/18	05/25	06/01
Contestant	Result						
Mateusz Sobecko				Btm 3			WINNER
Natalia Gap	Btm 3	Btm 3					Runner Up
Michał Przybyła			Btm 3			Elim	
Klaudia Sadło		Btm 3	Btm 3	Btm 3	~~Elim~~	Elim	
Agata Stachowiak				Btm 3		WD	
Hubert Kozłowski	Btm 3	Btm 3	Btm 3	Btm 3	Elim		
Artur Golec				Elim			
Sara Janicka			Btm 3	Elim			
Włodzimierz Kołobycz	Btm 3	Btm 3	Elim				
Paulina Kubicka			Elim				
Mikołaj Strzyż		Elim					
Ernestina Papazyan	Btm 3	Elim					
Patryk Brdej	Elim						
Monika Radziszewska	Elim						

== Performance shows ==
=== Week 1: Top 14 (20 April 2015) ===
- Group Dance: "Living for Love" - Madonna (Commercial; Choreographer: Tomasz Prządka (season 3)
- Top 14 Couple dances:

Couple	Style	Music	Choreographer(s)	Application voting		Results
Paulina Kubicka; Mikołaj Strzyż	Commercial	Flawless - Beyoncé	Sonia Soupha	88%	12%	Safe
Agata Stachowiak; Michał Przybyła	Contemporary	Elastic Heart - Sia	Julia Spiesser	86%	14%	Safe
Klaudia Sadło; Mateusz Sobecko	Dancehall	Come On to Me - Major Lazer & Sean Paul	Sonia Soupha	86%	14%	Safe
Sara Janicka; Artur Golec	Cha-cha-cha	Love Runs Out - OneRepublic	Joanna Szokalska	76%	24%	Safe
Ernestina Papazyan; Włodzimierz Kołobycz	Jazz	Take Me to Church - Hozier	Julia Spiesser	85%	15%	Bottom 3
Monika Radziszewska; Patryk Brdej	Salsa	Smooth Criminal - Michael Jackson	Agnieszka Abraham	57%	43%	Bottom 3
Natalia Gap; Hubert Kozłowski	Experimental	I Want You - Moloko	Wiola Fiuk (season 3)	88%	12%	Bottom 3

- Solos:

Dancer	Music	Result
Ernestina Papazyan	Crazy in Love (2014 Remix) - Beyoncé	Safe
Włodzimierz Kołobycz	Superman - Robin Thicke	Safe
Monika Radziszewska	Kill And Get Weh - Ryme Minista & Mavado	Eliminated
Patryk Brdej	Hey Ya! - Outkast	Eliminated
Natalia Gap	One - Ed Sheeran	Safe
Hubert Kozłowski	Everybody Dance Now - C+C Music Factory	Safe

- Eliminated:
  - Monika Radziszewska
  - Patryk Brdej

=== Week 2: Top 12 (27 April 2015) ===
- Group Dance: "G.D.F.R." - Flo Rida featuring Sage the Gemini and Lookas (Krump; Choreographer: Big Wave)
- Top 12 Couple dances:

Couple	Style	Music	Choreographer(s)	Application voting		Results
Natalia Gap; Włodzimierz Kołobycz	Jive	Runaway Baby - Bruno Mars	Joanna Szokalska	90%	10%	Bottom 3
Ernestina Papazyan; Mikołaj Strzyż	Hip-Hop	O.C.A.D - Muse	Ilona Bekier (season 5)	69%	31%	Bottom 3
Sara Janicka; Michał Przybyła	Jazz	What Kind of Man - Florence and the Machine	Lukas McFarlane	85%	15%	Safe
Agata Stachowiak; Artur Golec	Commercial	Trini Dem Girl - Nicki Minaj	Tomasz Prządka (season 3)	90%	10%	Safe
Paulina Kubicka; Mateusz Sobecko	Contemporary	Explosions - Ellie Goulding	Lukas McFarlane	92%	8%	Safe
Klaudia Sadło; Hubert Kozłowski	Krump	Power - Kanye West	Big Wave	72%	28%	Bottom 3

- Solos:

Dancer	Music	Result
Natalia Gap	New Romance - Azekel	Safe
Włodzimierz Kołobycz	Feeling Good - Michael Bublé	Safe
Ernestina Papazyan	Bounce - Iggy Azalea	Eliminated
Mikołaj Strzyż	Adorn - Miguel	Eliminated
Klaudia Sadło	Suga Suga - Baby Bash ft. Frankie J	Safe
Hubert Kozłowski	Renegades Of Funk - Rage Against the Machine	Safe

- Eliminated:
  - Ernestina Papazyan
  - Mikołaj Strzyż

=== Week 3: Top 10 (4 May 2015) ===
- Group Dance: "Love Me Like You Do" - Ellie Goulding (Jazz; Choreographer: Diana Matos)
- Guest Dancers:
  - Aleksandra Liashenko & Maksim Woitiul - Polish National Ballet first soloists - Don Quixote adagio
- Top 10 Couple dances:

Couple	Style	Music	Choreographer(s)	Application voting		Results
Klaudia Sadło; Michał Przybyła	Locking	Treasure - Bruno Mars	Wojciech "Blacha" Blaszko	89%	11%	Bottom 3
Paulina Kubicka; Włodzimierz Kołobycz	Modal Underground	Messiah - Madonna	Thierry Verger	62%	38%	Bottom 3
Sara Janicka; Hubert Kozłowski	Commercial Twerk	#Twerkit - Busta Rhymes feat. Nicki Minaj	Rafał "Roofi" Kamiński (season 1); Alisa Floryńska (season 6)	86%	14%	Bottom 3
Natalia Gap; Artur Golec	Contemporary	Zanim Pójdę - Happysad	Karolina Kroczak	78%	22%	Safe
Agata Stachowiak; Mateusz Sobecko	Hip-Hop	All Day - Kanye West feat. Theophilus London, Allan Kingdom & Paul McCartney	Diana Matos	90%	10%	Safe

- Solos:

Dancer	Music	Result
Klaudia Sadło	Body Language - Kid Ink feat. Usher & Tinashe	Safe
Michał Przybyła	Thinking Out Loud - Ed Sheeran	Safe
Paulina Kubicka	Burnin' Up - Jessie J feat. 2 Chainz	Eliminated
Włodzimierz Kołobycz	Peron - Jamal	Eliminated
Sara Janicka	All of Me - John Legend	Safe
Hubert Kozłowski	Kośił Jaś Koniczynę - Gienek Loska Band	Safe

- Eliminated:
  - Paulina Kubicka
  - Włodzimierz Kołobycz

=== Week 4: Top 8 (11 May 2015) ===
- Group Dances:

Dancers	Style	Music	Choreographer
Top 8 with Michał Piróg	Contemporary	Pibloktoq - Maria Peszek	Kaya Kołodziejczyk
Top 4 Female Dancers	Hip-Hop	7/11 - Beyoncé	Ilona Bekier (season 5)
Top 4 Male Dancers	Jazz	Can't Hold Us - Macklemore & Ryan Lewis feat. Ray Dalton	London Dyer

- Top 8 Couple dances:

Couple	Style	Music	Choreographer(s)	Application voting		Results
Sara Janicka; Mateusz Sobecko	Contemporary	Scarlett - Lemon	Mariusz Olszewski	86%	14%	Bottom 3
Agata Stachowiak; Hubert Kozłowski	American Smooth	Say Something - A Great Big World & Christina Aguilera	Mariusz Olszewski	79%	21%	Bottom 3
Klaudia Sadło; Artur Golec	Hip-Hop	212 - Azealia Banks	London Dyer	85%	15%	Bottom 3
Natalia Gap; Michał Przybyła	Jazz	Earned It - The Weeknd	Paweł Michno	91%	9%	Safe

- Solos:

Dancer	Music	Result
Sara Janicka	Jak Nie My To Kto - Mrozu feat. Tomson	Eliminated
Mateusz Sobecko	Shabba REMIX - A$AP Ferg feat. Shabba Ranks, Migos & Busta Rhymes	Safe
Agata Stachowiak	Wait - M83	Safe
Hubert Kozłowski	We Were In Love - Ta-ku	Safe
Klaudia Sadło	Anaconda - Nicki Minaj	Safe
Artur Golec	Take Shelter - Years & Years	Eliminated

- Eliminated:
  - Sara Janicka
  - Artur Golec

=== Week 5: Top 6 (18 May 2015) ===
- Group Dance: "Flashlight" - Jessie J (Jazz; Choreographer: Kasia Kizior)
- Guest Dancers:
  - Ida Nowakowska (Season 1) - Beneath Your Beautiful - Labrinth & Emeli Sandé
- Top 6 Couple dances:

Couple	Style	Music	Choreographer(s)	Application voting		Results
Klaudia Sadło; Marcin Mroziński(Season 3)	Hip-Hop/Dancehall/Krump/Wacking/Contemporary	Haunted - Beyoncé	Marcin Mroziński(Season 3)	85%	15%	Eliminated
Michał Przybyła; Paulina Figińska(Season 5)	Contemporary	Dreams - Gabrielle Aplin & Bastille	Paulina Figińska(Season 5)	85%	15%	Safe
Hubert Kozłowski; Natalia Madejczyk(Season 1)	Contemporary/Jazz	Crazy in Love - Sofia Karlberg	Natalia Madejczyk(Season 1)	79%	21%	Eliminated
Mateusz Sobecko; Adrianna Kawecka(Season 3)	Hip-Hop	Bitch Better Have My Money - Rihanna	Adrianna Kawecka(Season 3)	89%	11%	Safe
Natalia Gap; Łukasz Zięba(Season 4)	Contemporary/Jazz	If It Happens - SBTRKT feat. Sampha	Łukasz Zięba(Season 4)	81%	19%	Safe
Agata Stachowiak; Brian Poniatowski(Season 7)	Contemporary	Experience - I Virtuosi Italiani & Daniel Hope	Brian Poniatowski(Season 7)	93%	7%	Safe

- Solos:

Dancer	Music	Result
Klaudia Sadło	I See You - Jutty Ranx	Eliminated
Michał Przybyła	Lay Me Down - Sam Smith	Safe
Natalia Gap	You'll Find a Way - Santigold	Safe
Hubert Kozłowski	It's a Man's Man's Man's World - Seal	Eliminated
Agata Stachowiak	Holding Out for a Hero - Bonnie Tyler	Safe
Mateusz Sobecko	Drowning (STWO Remix) - Banks	Safe

- Eliminated:
  - Klaudia Sadło
  - Hubert Kozłowski

=== Week 6: Top 4 (25 May 2015) ===
- Group Dance: "Come Get It Bae" - Pharrell Williams (Broadway; Choreographer: Blake McGrath)
- Guest Dancers:
  - Bboy (Nikola Lawenda, Julia Kuczkowska, Marysia Malepsi, Jan Lewandowski, Daniel Haciński, Hubert Kozłowski, Piotr Szwarc) - Feel Right - Mark Ronson & Mystikal

Couple	Style	Music	Choreographer(s)	Application voting	Results
Klaudia Sadło; Natalia Gap	Hip-Hop	Partition - Beyoncé	Tomasz Prządka (season 3)		Sadło eliminated
Michał Przybyła; Mateusz Sobecko	Contemporary	Radioactive - Imagine Dragons	Gianluca Falvo		Przybyła eliminated
Michał Przybyła; Klaudia Sadło	Jazz	Latch - Disclosure & Sam Smith	Gianluca Falvo		Both eliminated
Mateusz Sobecko; Natalia Gap	Hip-Hop	Go Hard or Go Home - Wiz Khalifa & Iggy Azalea	Blake McGrath		Safe

- Solos:

Dancer	Music	Result
Klaudia Sadło	***Flawless - Beyoncé	Eliminated
Mateusz Sobecko	X - Chris Brown	Safe
Natalia Gap	Hush Hush; Hush Hush - The Pussycat Dolls	Safe
Michał Przybyła	Hopeless Wanderer - Mumford & Sons	Eliminated

- Eliminated:
  - Klaudia Sadło
  - Michał Przybyła

=== Week 7: Top 2 (3 June 2015) ===
- Guest Musical Guest: "Na zawsze" - Patricia Kazadi (with VOLT Group)
- Guest Dancers:
  - Fair Play Crew (with Rafał Kamiński from season 1 and Karol Niecikowski from season 3)
- Group dances:

Dancers	Style	Music	Choreographer
Top 14	Hip-Hop	Time of Our Lives - Pitbull & Ne-Yo	Matt Steffanina
Top 12	Jazz	Shake It Out - Florence and the Machine	

- Top 2 Couple dances:

Couple	Style	Music	Choreographer(s)	Application voting
Natalia Gap; Michał Przybyła	Jazz	Human - Christina Perri	Jonathan Huor	
Mateusz Sobecko; Monika Radziszewska	Hip-Hop	Hey Mama - David Guetta & Nicki Minaj & Afrojack	Matt Steffanina	
Natalia Gap; Mateusz Sobecko	Contemporary	Wrecking Ball - Miley Cyrus	Mariusz Olszewski	

- Top 2 solos:

Dancer	Music	Result
Natalia Gap	Impossible - James Arthur	Runner-Up
Mateusz Sobecko	See You Again - Wiz Khalifa	Winner

- Results:
  - Winner: Mateusz Sobecko
  - Runner Up: Natalia Gap

== All-stars ==
During top 6 dancers from previous season danced with the participants as the part of the competition.

== Ratings ==
Episode	Date	Viewers (millions)	Share (%)	Share 16-49 (%)	Source(s)
Auditions 1	2 March	2.12	15.1	18.2	
Auditions 2	9 March	1.88	13.8	—N/a	
Auditions 3	16 March	2.10	15.1	20.2	
Auditions 4	23 March	1.93	14.0	18.0	
Auditions 5	30 March	—N/a	—N/a	17.5	
Seville 1	6 April	—N/a	—N/a	—N/a	
Seville 2	13 April	—N/a	—N/a	18.7	
Live Show Top 14	20 April	—N/a	—N/a	18.3	
Live Show Top 12	27 April	—N/a	—N/a	—N/a	
Live Show Top 10	4 May	—N/a	—N/a	—N/a	
Live Show Top 8	11 May	—N/a	—N/a	—N/a	
Live Show Top 6	18 May	—N/a	—N/a	—N/a	
Live Show Top 4	25 May	—N/a	—N/a	—N/a	
Live Show Top 2	1 June	—N/a	—N/a	—N/a	
Average	2015	1.68	12.8	16.0	
