= You Can Dance – Po Prostu Tańcz! season 9 =

You Can Dance – Po Prostu Tańcz!
- Season 9
- Hosted by: Patricia Kazadi
- Judges: Agustin Egurrola; Michał Piróg; Ida Nowakowska; Maciej Florek
- Winner: Stefano Silvino
- Runner-up: Aleksandra Borkowska

Release
- Original network: TVN
- Original release: 17 February – 18 May 2016

Season chronology
- ← Previous; Season 8

The ninth series of You Can Dance – Po prostu Tańcz! premiered on TVN on 17 February 2016. This series was changed to the new format. The judging panel was extended by winner of the first season Maciej Florek and finalist of the same season Ida Nowakowska, who joined original judges Agustin Egurrola and Michał Piróg. Kinga Rusin didn't return as judge due to her commitments as host of an upcoming series Agent - Gwiazdy, a celebrity version of The Mole on TVN. Patricia Kazadi remains the host of the series.

Judges' auditions began on 7 January 2016 in Warsaw and ended on 12 January 2016.

== Auditions ==
Open audition began on 9 December 2015 in Wrocław and ended on 4 January 2016 in Warsaw.

Air date	Open audition date	Audition City	Audition Venue
17 February 2016	9 December 2015	Wrocław	National Music Forum
24 February 2016	15 December 2015	Gdańsk	Polish Baltic Philharmony
2 March 2016	18 December 2015	Szczecin	Azoty Arena
9 March 2016	20 December 2015	Katowice	International Congress Centre
16 March 2016	4 January 2016	Warsaw	Centrum Bankowo-Finansowe Nowy Świat
Total number of tickets			36

In a change from previous years, open auditions are not immediately followed by filmed auditions with judges and a live audience on the following day. These instead took place on 7, 8, 11 and 12 January 2016 in Transcolor Studio in Warsaw. The 36 selected dancers will then take part in a choreography camp in Malta.

=== Top 36 dancers ===
During the auditions judges picked 36 dancers. These dancers were taking part in choreography camp in Malta.

City	Dancer	Number of dancers	Number of top 14 dancers
Wrocław	Oliwia Ratyńska	6	4
Wrocław	Paulina Wiszowata	6	4
Wrocław	Nader Hasnaoui	6	4
Wrocław	Anna Dowganowska	6	4
Wrocław	Klaudia Antos^{1}	6	4
Wrocław	Jessica Ali^{2}	6	4
Gdańsk	Hanna Szychowicz	6	3
Gdańsk	Julia Adamczyk	6	3
Gdańsk	Tomasz Gruszecki	6	3
Gdańsk	Joachim Uetake	6	3
Gdańsk	Paulina Fedorowska	6	3
Gdańsk	Natalia Kubicka	6	3
Szczecin	Krzysztof Wróblewski	6	2
Szczecin	Aleksandra Borkowska	6	2
Szczecin	Daniel Chaciński	6	2
Szczecin	Artur Kuriata	6	2
Szczecin	Dominika Wójcikiewicz^{2}	6	2
Szczecin	Adam Papazyan^{1}	6	2
Katowice	Michał Kalcowski	5	3
Katowice	Maja Bratus	5	3
Katowice	Paulina Gajewska	5	3
Katowice	Bartosz Wójcik	5	3
Katowice	Paulina Mostowska	5	3
Krystian Stemplewski
Warsaw	Andrii Shkapoid	3	1
Warsaw	Michał Kazimierczak	3	1
Warsaw	Stefano Silvinio	3	1

^1These dancers were shown only in youcandance.tvn.pl website extras.

^2These dancers earned the tickets after the choreography round.

=== Returning dancers ===
This season there were some dancers returning from previous seasons.

Dancer	Previous attempt(s)	This season Result
Michał Kalcowski	Season 8; Workshops	TOP 6

== Choreography Camp (Malta) Week ==
Judges: Agustin Egurolla, Ida Nowakowska, Maciej Florek, Michał Piróg

Task/style	Choreographer(s)
Hip-Hop	TBA
Jazz	TBA
Krump	Orville Tchozn Small
Final choreography	Brian Friedman

== Top 14 contestants ==
=== Women ===
Finalist	Age	Home Town	Dance Specialty	Elimination date
Aleksandra Borkowska	19	Siedlce	Jazz	Runner-up
Hanna Szychowicz	16	Łódź	Contemporary	11 May 2016; Re-entered competition (27 April 2016); 20 April 2016
Anna Dowganowska	28	Lwów, Ukraine	Modern Jazz	4 May 2016
Klaudia Antos	19	Brzeźnica	Video Dance	27 April 2016
Julia Adamczyk	22	Warsaw	Ballroom – Latin	27 April 2016 – Withdrew
Maja Bratus	23	Łódź	Disco Dance	13 April 2016
Paulina Wiszowata	20	Niewiarowo	Hip-Hop	6 April 2016

=== Men ===
Finalist	Age	Home Town	Dance Specialty	Elimination date
Stefano Silvino	23	Sicily, Italy	Contemporary	Winner
Joachim Uetake	18	Poznań, Japan	Hip-Hop	11 May 2016
Michał Kalcowski	23	Bierutowo	Street Dance	4 May 2016
Nader Hasnaoui	26	Wrocław, Tunisia	Hip-Hop	27 April 2016; Re-entered competition (20 April 2016); 13 April 2016
Bartosz Wójcik	25	Ostrołęka	Jazz	20 April 2016
Artur Kuriata	21	Samborowo	Street Dance	20 April 2016 – Withdrew
Łukasz Józefowicz	26	Łódź	Contemporary	6 April 2016

== Elimination chart ==
Key:
Female	Male	Bottom 3 Couples	Eliminated	Withdrew	Winner	Runner-up

	04/06	04/13	04/20	04/27	05/04	05/11	05/18
Contestant	Result						
Stefano Silvino				Btm 3			WINNER
Aleksandra Borkowska			Btm 3				Runner-up
Joachim Uetake			Btm 3			Elim	
Hanna Szychowicz	Btm 3	Btm 3	~~Elim~~	Btm 3		Elim	
Anna Dowganowska	Btm 3			Btm 3	Elim		
Michał Kalcowski		Btm 3	Btm 3	Btm 3	Elim		
Nader Hasnaoui		~~Elim~~		Elim			
Klaudia Antos		Btm 3	Btm 3	Elim			
Julia Adamczyk				WD			
Bartosz Wójcik	Btm 3		Elim				
Artur Kuriata	Btm 3	Btm 3	WD				
Maja Bratus		Elim					
Łukasz Józefowicz	Elim						
Paulina Wiszowata	Elim						

== Performance shows ==
=== Week 1: Top 14 (6 April 2016) ===
- Group Dance: Devil's Whisper — Raury / Keeping Your Head Up (Don Diablo Remix) – Birdy (Krump/Jazz; Choreographer: Ida Nowakowska & Maciej Florek) with Ida Nowakowska & Maciej Florek (Season 1 contestants and new judges)
- Top 14 Couple dances:

Couple	Style	Music	Choreographer(s)	Results
Joachim Uetake; Klaudia Antos	Hip-Hop	Get Ugly – Jason Derulo	Justyna Lichacy	Safe
Stefano Silvino; Maja Bratus	Contemporary	Bird Set Free – Sia	Katarzyna Kizior	Safe
Bartosz Wójcik; Hanna Szychowicz	Jazz	How Deep Is Your Love – Calvin Harris & Disciples	Stephan Reynolds	Bottom 3
Artur Kuriata; Paulina Wiszowata	House	Wilk – Natalia Nykiel	Justyna Lichacy	Bottom 3
Nader Hasnaoui; Aleksandra Borkowska	Contemporary Breaking	Make Up & Costume – Alexandre Desplat (from The Danish Girl)	Natalia Madejczyk (Season 1)	Safe
Michał Kalcowski; Julia Adamczyk	Latino	Sax – Fleur East	Joanna Szokalska	Safe
Łukasz Józefowicz; Anna Dowganowska	Broadway	Friend Like Me – Ne-Yo	Stephan Reynolds	Bottom 3

- Bottom 3 Couples solos:

Dancer	Music	Result
Hanna Szychowicz	EdIT – Ants	Safe
Bartosz Wójcik	Worthy – Jacob Banks	Safe
Paulina Wiszowata	Wap Wap – Busy Signal	Eliminated
Artur Kuriata	Stitches – Shawn Mendes	Safe
Anna Dowganowska	Sweet People – Alyosha	Safe
Łukasz Józefowicz	Give Me Love – Ed Sheeran	Eliminated

- Eliminated:
  - Łukasz Józefowicz
  - Paulina Wiszowata

=== Week 2: Top 12 (13 April 2016) ===
- Group Dance: Light It Up (Remix) — Major Lazer feat. Nyla & Fuse ODG (Dancehall/Bollywood; Choreographer: Diana Matos)
- Top 12 Couple dances:

Couple	Style	Music	Choreographer(s)	Results
Bartosz Wójcik; Anna Dowganowska	Contemporary	What is Love – Kiesza	Karolina Kroczak	Safe
Joachim Uetake; Julia Adamczyk	Hip-Hop	Team – Iggy Azalea	Diana Matos	Safe
Artur Kuriata; Klaudia Antos	Afro Dance	Black Skinhead – Kanye West	Ilona Bekier (season 5)	Bottom 3
Nader Hasnaoui; Hanna Szychowicz	New Age	Work – Rihanna feat. Drake	Julia Żytko (season 4)	Bottom 3
Stefano Silvino; Aleksandra Borkowska	Jazz	Pillowtalk – Zayn	Diana Matos	Safe
Michał Kalcowski; Maja Bratus	L.A. Style	Trumpet Lights – Chris Brown feat. Sabrina Antionette	Marcin Mroziński (season 3)	Bottom 3

- Bottom 3 Couples solos:

Dancer	Music	Result
Klaudia Antos	Burnitup! – Janet Jackson & Missy Elliott	Safe
Artur Kuriata	Desire – Years & Years	Safe
Hanna Szychowicz	Uncover – Zara Larsson	Safe
Nader Hasnaoui	All Night – Parov Stelar	Eliminated
Maja Bratus	Who You Are – Jessie J	Eliminated
Michał Kalcowski	Bun Up the Dance – Dillon Francis & Skrillex	Safe

- Eliminated:
  - Nader Hasnaoui
  - Maja Bratus

=== Week 3: Top 10 (20 April 2016) ===
- Group Dance: Turn the Music Louder (Rumble) — KDA feat. Katy B & Tinie Tempah (Hip-Hop; Choreographer: Katarzyna Kizior)
- Guest Dancers:
  - Michał Piróg (YCD Judge) – Satin Birds – Abel Korzeniowski
  - Maciej Florek (YCD Judge) – TBA
  - Ida Nowakowska (YCD Judge) & Igor Leonik (season 7) – I Won't Dance – Frank Sinatra
  - Agustin Egurolla (YCD Judge) & Paulina Kubicka (season 8) – Ran Kan Kan – Tito Puente
- Top 10 Couple dances:

Couple	Style	Music	Choreographer(s)	Results
Joachim Uetake; Aleksandra Borkowska	Salsa	Sorry (Latino Remix) – Justin Bieber feat. J Balvin	Orville Tchozn Small	Bottom 3
Michał Kalcowski; Hanna Szychowicz	Krump	Work Hard, Play Hard – Wiz Khalifa	Orville Tchozn Small	Bottom 3
Stefano Silvino; Anna Dowganowska	Experimental	The Hanging Tree – James Newton Howard feat. Jennifer Lawrence	Wiola Fiuk (season 3)	Safe
Bartosz Wójcik; Klaudia Antos	Commercial	The Water Dacne – Chris Porter feat. Pitbull	Tomasz Prządka (season 3)	Bottom 3
Nader Hasnaoui; Julia Adamczyk	Jazz	When We Were Young – Adele	Paweł Michno	Safe

- Bottom 3 Couples solos:

Dancer	Music	Result
Aleksandra Borkowska	I Was Here – Beyoncé	Safe
Joachim Uetake	Don't Tell 'Em – Jeremih	Safe
Hanna Szychowicz	I See Fire – Ed Sheeran	Eliminated
Michał Kalcowski	One Touch (Remix) – Baauer feat. AlunaGeorge	Safe
Klaudia Antos	Give Me Love – Ciara	Safe
Bartosz Wójcik	Run Boy Run – Woodkid	Eliminated

- Eliminated:
  - Bartosz Wójcik
  - Hanna Szychowicz

=== Week 4: Top 8 (27 April 2016) ===
- Group dances:

Dancers	Style	Music	Choreographer
Top 8	Hip-Hop	Shut up and Dance – Walk the Moon	
Top 4 Street Dancers; Michał Kalcowski; Nader Hasnaoui; Joachim Uetake; Klaudia Antos	Hip-Hop	Android Porn – Kraddy	Maciej Florek (season 1)
Top 3 Stage Dancers; Anna Dowganowska; Aleksandra Borkowska; Stefano Silvino	Jazz	California Dreamin' – Sia	Ida Nowakowska (season 1)

- Top 8 Couple dances:

Couple	Style	Music	Choreographer(s)	Results
Michał Kalcowski; Klaudia Antos	Contemporary	W Dobrą Stronę – Dawid Podsiadło	Karolina Kroczak	Bottom 3
Nader Hasnaoui; Anna Dowganowska	Hip-Hop	What Do You Mean? – Justin Bieber		Bottom 3
Joachim Uetake; Aleksandra Borkowska	Jazz	Ostatni – Edyta Bartosiewicz	Paweł Michno	Safe
Stefano Silvino; Hanna Szychowicz	Dancehall	Outta Control – Sean Paul feat. Yolanda Be Cool & Mayra Verónica	Karolina 'Cuki' Dziemieszkiewicz (season 7)	Bottom 3

- Bottom 3 Couples solos:

Dancer	Music	Result
Klaudia Antos	Needed Me – Rihanna	Eliminated
Michał Kalcowski	Jungle Bae – Jack Ü feat. Bunji Garlin	Safe
Anna Dowganowska	Bottom of the Rive – Delta Rae	Safe
Nader Hasnaoui	Lush Life – Nat King Cole	Eliminated
Hanna Szychowicz	Read All About It – Emeli Sande	Safe
Stefano Silvino	The Ripe & Ruin – Alt-J	Safe

- Eliminated:
  - Nader Hasnaoui
  - Klaudia Antos

=== Week 5: Top 6 (4 May 2016) ===
- Group Dance: Bang Bang – will.i.am (Hip-Hop; Choreographer: TBA) with Natalia Madejczyk, Alisa Floryńska, Paulina Figińska, Mateusz Sobecko, Rafał Kamiński and Brian Poniatowski (dancers from previous seasons)
- Guest Dancers:
  - Dancers and actors from musical Wszystko gra – Wszystko, czego dziś chcę – Eliza Rycembel, Karolina Czarnecka & Irena Melcer (Choreographer: Agustin Egurolla)
    - Karolina Dziemieszkiewicz (Season 7)
    - Tomasz Prządka (Season 3)
    - Adrianna Piechota
    - Sebastian Fabijański (Actor)
    - Artur Golec (Season 8)
    - Igor Leonik (Season 7)
    - Włodzimierz Kołobycz (Season 8)
    - Piotr Jeznach (Season 4)
    - Jakub "Frycek" Frydrychewicz (Season 7)
    - Paulina Kubicka (Season 8)
    - Ilona Bekier (Season 5)
    - Klaudia Sadło (Season 8)
- Top 6 Couple dances:

Couple	Style	Music	Choreographer(s)	Results
Michał Kalcowski; Alisa Floryńska (Season 6)	Hip-Hop	Girls Like – Tinie Tempah feat. Zara Larsson	Alisa Floryńska (Season 6)	Eliminated
Aleksandra Borkowska; Brian Poniatowski (Season 7)	Contemporary	Dance for Me Wallis – Abel Korzeniowski (from W.E.)	Brian Poniatowski (Season 7)	Safe
Anna Dowganowska; Natalia Madejczyk (Season 1)	Contemporary	Rien – Éléphant	Natalia Madejczyk (Season 1)	Eliminated
Joachim Ueatake; Rafał Kamiński (Season 1)	Hip-Hop	Puttin' On the Ritz (Club des Belugas Mix) – Fred Astaire	Rafał Kamiński (Season 1)	Safe
Stefano Silvino; Paulina Figińska (Season 5)	Contemporary	Castle – Halsey	Paulina Figińska (Season 5)	Safe
Hanna Szychowicz; Mateusz Sobecko (Season 8)	Hip-Hop	Lord Knows – Meek Mill feat. Tory Lanez	Mateusz Sobecko (Season 8)	Safe

- Bottom 3 Couples solos:

Dancer	Music	Result
Aleksandra Borkowska	Hate or Glory – Gesaffelstein	Safe
Michał Kalcowski	Pass That Dutch – Missy Elliott	Eliminated
Anna Dowganowska	Talking to the Moon – Bruno Mars	Eliminated
Joachim Uetake	Y I Do – Zebra Katz	Safe
Hanna Szychowicz	Nathan Lanier – Torn	Safe
Stefano Silvino	Bang Bang – Asaf Avidan	Safe

- Eliminated:
  - Anna Dowganowska
  - Michał Kalcowski

=== Week 6: Top 4 (11 May 2016) ===
- Group Dance: Everybody Wants to Rule the World – Lorde (Jazz; Choreographer: TBA)
- Musical Guest: Nie mów nie – Dawid Kwiatkowski
- Top 4 Couple dances:

Couple	Style	Music	Choreographer(s)	Results
Stefano Silvino; Joachim Uetake	House	Paradise (Radio Edit) – Benny Benassi & Chris Brown		Uetake eliminated
Hanna Szychowicz; Aleksandra Borkowska	Contemporary	Game of Thrones Theme – Break of Reality (Cello cover)		Szychowicz eliminated
Joachim Uetake; Aleksandra Borkowska	Commercial	Kaktus – Bovska	Tomasz Prządka (season 3)	Uetake eliminated
Stefano Silvino; Hanna Szychowicz	Contemporary	One Million Bullets – Sia	Nicholas	Szychowicz eliminated

- Bottom 2 Couples solos:

Dancer	Music	Result
Aleksandra Borkowska	Bury Me – Brodinski feat. Maluca & Bricc Baby Shitro	Safe
Joachim Uetake	Murder – Justin Timberlake feat. Jay-Z	Eliminated
Hanna Szychowicz	Ólafur Arnalds – Brotsjór	Eliminated
Stefano Silvino	To Know Him is to Love Him – Amy Winehouse	Safe

- Eliminated:
  - Joachim Uetake
  - Hanna Szychowicz

=== Week 7: Top 2 (18 May 2016) ===
- Guest Dancers:
  - Caro Dance
- Group dances:

Dancers	Style	Music	Choreographer
Top 14		Welcome to the Jungle – Guns N' Roses	
Top 14 (without TOP 2)		Can't Stop the Feeling – Justin Timberlake	

- Top 2 Couple dances:

Couple	Style	Music	Choreographer(s)
Stefano Silvino; Aleksandra Borkowska		Don't Let Me Down – The Chainsmokers feat. Daya	Jerome Esplana
Aleksandra Borkowska; Bartosz Wójcik	Jazz	Wait – M83	Brian Poniatowski (Season 7)
Stefano Silvino; Klaudia Antos			

- Bottom 2 Couples solos:

Dancer	Music	Results
Aleksandra Borkowska	Sarajevo – Max Richter	Runner-up
Stefano Silvino	Tommy's Theme – Noisia	Winner

== Ratings ==
Episode	Date	Viewers (millions)	Share (%)	Share 16–49 (%)	Source(s)
Auditions 1	17 February	1.41	10.4	—N/a	
Auditions 2	24 February	1.59	11.5	—N/a	
Auditions 3	2 March	1.39	10.1	—N/a	
Auditions 4	9 March	1.59	11.7	—N/a	
Auditions 5	16 March	—N/a	—N/a	—N/a	
Malta 1	23 March	—N/a	—N/a	—N/a	
Malta 2	30 March	1.43	10.7	—N/a	
Live Show Top 14	6 April	—N/a	—N/a	—N/a	
Live Show Top 12	13 April	—N/a	—N/a	—N/a	
Live Show Top 10	20 April	—N/a	—N/a	—N/a	
Live Show Top 8	27 April	—N/a	—N/a	—N/a	
Live Show Top 6	4 May	—N/a	—N/a	—N/a	
Live Show Top 4	11 May	—N/a	—N/a	—N/a	
Live Show Top 2	18 May	—N/a	—N/a	—N/a	
Average	2016	1.31	10.3	13.2	
