= Ida Nowakowska =

Polish - American actress (born 1990)

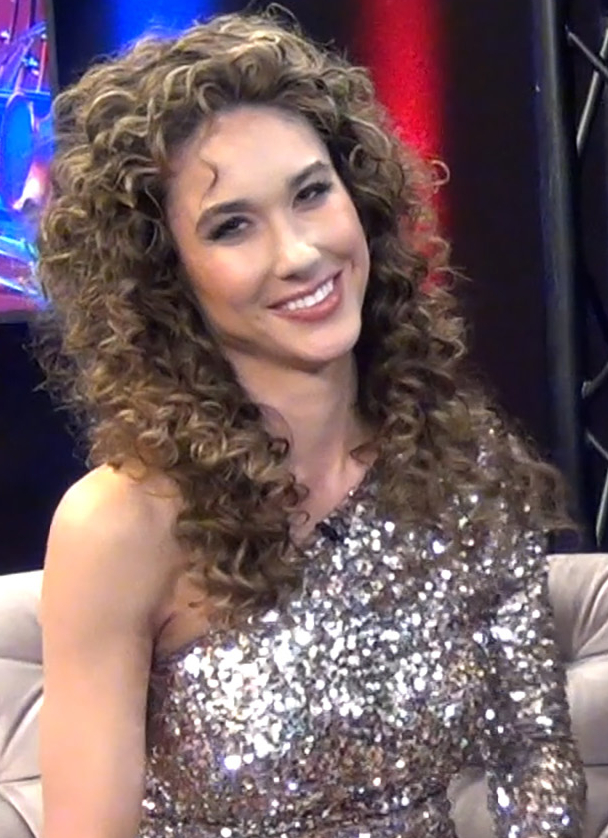
- Nowakowska in 2021
- Born: Ida Nowakowska; December 7, 1990 (age 35); Warsaw, Poland
- Other names: Ida Victoria, Ida Nowakowska-Herndon
- Occupations: Actress, dancer, singer, presenter, TV personality
- Years active: 1997–present
- Notable work: Metropolitan Opera, So You Think You Can Dance, Junior Eurovision Song Contest as presenter
- Spouse: Jack Herndon (m. 2015)
- Children: 1

Ida Nowakowska-Herndon (born December 7, 1990) is a Polish actress, dancer, singer, television personality and television presenter. Ranked 19th in the ranking of the 100 most valuable women's personal brands according to "Forbes Women Polska"; her market value in 2022 was estimated at over PLN 90 million.

She is the only artist in the history of the So You Think You Can Dance television show to dance, judge and host the TV series. She was a contestant on the first season of the Polish version of the show at the age of 16 years old (youngest contestant), then returned as a judge, was the host of the So You Think You Can Dance: The Next Generation, the Polish version of the TV series, then in the following season came back as the judge again.

== Early life and career ==
She studied in New York City at the prestigious Professional Performing Arts School (alumni of the school include Alicia Keys, Britney Spears among others) and Steps on Broadway and performed at the Metropolitan Opera in La Bayadere and Les Troyens and in the lead role in a musical Reel to Real in Lincoln Center. She was already the host of 89+ TV Series on TVP1 when she was only 12 years old.

In 2007, when she was only 16 years old, she was the finalist (and the youngest contestant) of the first season of the Polish version of So You Think You Can Dance. She was the host of TV show Przymierzalnia on Canal+.

She graduated from the National Ballet School in Warsaw winning the title of the best graduate of ballet schools in Poland.

She was a soloist of the top musical theater in Poland - "Roma" Musical Theater in Warsaw, where she performed in the musicals: Peter Pan, Dance of the Vampires, Cats (Victoria - The White Cat) and The Phantom of the Opera (Meg Giry). She was an actress and dancer at Studio Buffo theater, where she took part in the musicals: Metro and Romeo and Juliet.

She received a triple platinum for the “Phantom of the Opera” album where she sang the part of Meg Giry.

She played the main role in the film Out of Reach.

She graduated from the School of Theater, Film and Television from University of California, Los Angeles with a musical theatre specialty and a degree in political science from UCLA.

She returned as a judge for the Polish version of So You Think You Can Dance ninth season in 2016.

From 2019, she was a judge of the 3 seasons of Dance Dance Dance broadcast on TVP2 in Poland.

She was the host of Poland's Junior Bake Off and Bake off - Ale Ciacho!.

She was a judge on a CBS talent show The World's Best filmed in Los Angeles, California, the show was hosted by James Corden, the judges included Drew Barrymore, RuPaul, Faith Hill as well as experts from around the world.

She became the host of the popular Polish morning TV show Pytanie na Śniadanie, she remained the host of the show until January 2024.

She is the host of The Voice Kids, so far she has hosted 5 seasons of the show.

She hosted an innovative in history of television program in which she led 6 contestants in following the footsteps of the history of the Anders Army, in difficult conditions she travelled through Syberia, Kazakhstan, Iran, Israel and Italy (the final historical battle of Monte Cassino) filming the show titled Szlak Nadziei (Trail of Hope).

Nowakowska hosted the Junior Eurovision Song Contest 2019 in Gliwice on November 24, 2019. where she also presented a live dance performance.

She was the host of TV series about the United States of America Ameryka da się lubić where she was zooming in on the United States so Polish people could understand America better. She has always been the ambassador of Polish-American relations and friendship.

She has been the host of the New Year's Eve live TV broadcasting show Sylwester Marzeń z Dwójką where Jason Derulo, Black Eyed Peas among others performed (2019–2022).

On October 7, 2020, it was announced that Nowakowska would again host the Junior Eurovision Song Contest in Warsaw on November 29., additionally performing as a dancer as well. Ida is one of three presenters in the history of the Junior Eurovision Song Contest that has hosted the competition twice. She is also the first person to conduct the competition twice in a row. She also served as the spokesperson for Poland's jury votes at the Eurovision Song Contest between 2021 and 2023.

She is the host of the Virtuosos V4+ international talent show broadcast in multiple countries (2020–2024). The judges on the show include Placido Domingo, Stjepan Hauser, Matteo Bocelli and Dimash Qudaibergen.

== Awards ==
In 2009, she received the title of the best graduate of ballet schools in Poland at the "Gold Pointes" („Zlote Pointy” in Polish) competition.

In 2016, she received an award from the readers of Glamour magazine for winning the talent of the year category.

In 2021, she received the Silver and Gold BohaterON (HeroN Award) for implementing the Trail of Hope program, and also won the Party Stars plebiscite of the "Party" magazine.

In 2022, she received the award for a charismatic media personality and outstanding stage artist at the Polish Businesswomen Awards gala.

In 2023 she received the Audience Award (Wiktory) and the "Personality of the Year" statuette at the "Personality and Success" Gala in Warsaw.

In 2022, she was ranked 19th in the ranking of the 100 most valuable women's personal brands according to "Forbes Women Polska"; her market value was estimated at over PLN 90 million.

== Charity ==
She is an ambassador of Caritas, the "School for School" campaign supporting the education of children in Syria, the "Good Day" campaign for children evacuated from war-ravaged Ukraine.

She is an ambassador of the Solidarity Corps supporting volunteering.

She is an ambassador of the Special Olympics.

== Filmography ==
Year	Title	Role
1997	Bastard	
2004	Out of Reach	Irena Morawska
2010	Adolescent Ordeals	Alexis
2011	Suicide Room	Weronika
2011	Most Wanted	Dancer

Preceded by (Belarus) Evgeny Perlin, Zinaida Kupriyanovich and Helena Meraai	Junior Eurovision Song Contest presenter 2019, 2020; With: Aleksander Sikora and Roksana Węgiel (2019); Rafał Brzozowski and Małgorzata Tomaszewska (2020)	Succeeded by (France) Élodie Gossuin, Olivier Minne and Carla Lazzari
