= You Can Dance – Po prostu tańcz! =

- Created by: Simon Fuller; Nigel Lythgoe
- Directed by: Roch Fortin; Bartosz Łabęcki
- Presented by: Kinga Rusin (series 1–5); Patricia Kazadi (series 6–9); Maciej Dowbor (series 10–)
- Judges: Agustin Egurolla (series 1–9); Michał Piróg (series 1–9); Maciej Florek (series 9); Ida Nowakowska (series 9); Weronika Marczuk-Pazura (series 1–4); Anna Mucha (series 5); Kinga Rusin (series 6–8)
- Country of origin: Poland
- No. of seasons: 9
- No. of episodes: 117 + 3 specials

Production
- Executive producers: Ewa Leja (TVN); Grzegorz Piekarski (Golden Media Poland)
- Production locations: Various cities (auditions); Various cities around the world (choreography camps); live shows: Studio in Janki (series 1–4); Farat Film Studio, Warsaw (series 5–7); Transcolor Studio, Szeligi near Warsaw (series 8–)
- Running time: 45 mins auditions and choreography camp episodes 75 mins live shows
- Production companies: Golden Media Poland; Endemol Poland (series 8)

Original release
- Network: TVN
- Release: 5 September 2007 – 6 June 2012
- Release: 2 March 2015 – 18 May 2016
- Release: 26 February 2025 – present

Related
- You Can Dance – Nowa generacja (TVP; 2021, 2023)

You Can Dance – Po prostu tańcz! (You Can Dance – Just Dance!) is a televised Polish dance competition with a format based on the American show So You Think You Can Dance. Dancers compete to win PLN 100,000, and a 3-month scholarship in dance school Broadway Dance Center and International Dance Academy in Los Angeles from season 7 on. The winners to date are (in order of season): Maciek "Gleba" Florek, Artur Cieciórski, Wiola Fiuk, Ania Kapera, Jakub Jóżwiak, Dominik Olechowski, Brian Poniatowski, Mateusz Sobecko and Stefano Silvino.

== Format ==
As with most entries in the So You Think You Can Dance franchise, dancers are chosen by expert judges who pick an initial pool of talent from open auditions. In the Polish iteration, these dancers (usually numbering 36) then travel to advanced multidisciplinary workshops in countries abroad (equivalent to the 'Vegas Week' or 'Boot Camp' portions of other So You Think You Can Dance shows). Over successive waves of choreography rounds, the judges ultimately select 16 (seasons 1–4) or 14 (seasons 5-present) contestants to compete in the live competition shows. In the live portion of the competition, the Top 16 or 14 dancers compete as couples in duets and in group routines, competing for home viewer votes, with a bottom three couples picked by judges most nights and the male and female dancers garnering the fewest votes being eliminated. Each Season ends with a Top 3 or Top 2 finale.

=== Open auditions ===
The open auditions, the first stage in determining a season's finalists, take place in 5–6 major Polish cities each season and are typically open to anyone aged 16–30 at the time of their audition. The cities where auditions are held change from season to season but some, such as Warsaw and Gdańsk, Wrocław have featured in most seasons. This stage is divided into two parts: first is the pre-casting phase, in which dancers perform an improvised routine to the music given by pre-casting judges (usually choreographers). Dancers chosen to advance to the next round receive a blue wristband. During this next stage, dancers perform their routine (typically a solo, but duet and group routines are allowed as well) before a panel of show judges. This panel then decides on-the-spot whether the dancer demonstrated enough ability and performance value to proceed further. If the dancer exhibited exceptional ability in their performance, judges award a "ticket" to the next round, (the workshops), which are held each season in a city outside of Poland. Alternatively, if judges are on the fence about the dancer, they will ask the contestant to wait until the end of that day's auditions to participate in a short test of their ability to pick up professional choreography.

Season	Workshop Location	Special Guest Choreographer
1	Paris, France	Wade Robson
2	Buenos Aires, Argentina	Marty Kudelka
3	Barcelona, Spain	Brian Friedman
4	Lisbon, Portugal	Laurie Ann Gibson
5	Tel Aviv, Israel	Travis Payne
6	Casablanca, Morocco	Tyce Diorio
7	Santa Cruz, Spain	Tina Landon
8	Seville, Spain	Nappytabs
9	Malta	Brian Friedman

=== Workshops ===
The second stage of the selection process is a seven-day-long process in which the remaining dancers are tested for overall well-rounded dance ability, stamina, and their ability to perform under pressure. The dancers are put through a series of dance styles that are later prominent in the competition phase, such as hip-hop, jazz, ballroom and contemporary. Judges eliminate dancers during certain lessons by giving them yellow and red cards. After approximately three days, dancers perform in front of the judges and there are cuts after every genre. Remaining dancers advance to the final choreography round which features a special guest choreographer (often these are choreographers connected to original American version of the show: Tyce Diorio, Wade Robson, Brian Friedman). At the end of the workshops, usually less than 30 competitors remain in a pool that final contestants are chosen from. Most seasons have featured 16 top finalists for the competition portion of the show, but from season 5 through the most recent seasons, a Top 14 has been selected

=== Finalist selection ===
Finalists are selected during the final session at the end of workshops week. Dancers perform their final choreographed routine (usually in groups of 5 or 6) in front of the judges panel and the guest choreographer. After all groups have performed, the judges panel addresses each remaining contestant individually and reveals whether they will remain in the competition for the live shows, though sometimes they may ask for one last solo before making this determination.

=== Top 16/Top 14 to Top 10 ===
Following the finalist selection process, the show transitions into its regular competition phase, which lasts the rest of the season. The competition stage is divided into 7–9 weeks, with two contestants eliminated per week (or in the case of semi-finals in seasons 1–3, one contestant). Dancers are paired up in some seasons at random, and in others by judges into male-female couples that will stay paired until the last 2 or 3 weeks of the competition if neither is eliminated. These couples perform every week in randomly selected styles. These duets, as with all non-solo performances at this stage in the competition, are choreographed by professional choreographers, who are often noteworthy names in their own genres. Prior to most duet performances, a video packet of clips of the couple preparing to perform the routine is shown; these packets are intended not only to demonstrate the couple's efforts to master the routine, but also to give glimpses of the personalities of the dancers as well as to allow the choreographer to give insight as to the thematic, narrative, and artistic intentions of the piece. Following each duet performance, the panel of judges gives critical feedback.

After every performance episode, the judges pick a bottom three couples. Each of these six dancers are then in danger of elimination and must perform a solo as their last effort to impress and stay in the competition. It is at this point that viewers can vote for their favorite dancers. The eliminated dancers are then announced and given a brief send-off via a video montage.

=== Top 6 to Finale ===
Around the time that the show enters its 'Top Six' competitor phase, there are typically several format changes that take place. The judges give up their power to save dancers at this point, and eliminations are determined exclusively by viewer votes, with judges serving in only an advisory capacity. Each season undergoes one final format shake-up in its last week, which typically takes place when the show reaches a Top 2 (in seasons 1–3 – Top 3). In the final show, the remaining dancers typically each dance duets with all of their remaining fellow finalists as well as perform solos and participate in group numbers. The season finale episode is often the most elaborately produced show of a season and features the last performances of the competitors, guest dancers, additional group numbers and multiple video packets chronicling the course of the season's events, all culminating in the announcement of the winner of the competition.

=== Judge's panel ===
The judges panel has been consistently composed of three permanent judges, with only rare guest judges supplementing this number. In season 2 Izabella Miko joined the panel as additional judge. Agustin Egurolla serves as the executive judge of the panel and can overrule majority decisions, and has done so on two occasions. In season 5 Weronika Marczuk-Pazura left the show and was replaced by Anna Mucha, who in turn left the panel in season 6 and was replaced by the show's former host, Kinga Rusin.

=== Overview of format and presentation by season ===
Season	Dates	Time-slot	Host	Judges	Dancer showcase episode?	Number of finalists in first live show	Number of contestants remaining in finale	Point at which judges stop nomining bottom 3 couples
1	Autumn 2007 (September–December)	Wednesday 9.30 p.m (1–12); Sunday 8.00 (13)	Kinga Rusin	Agustin Egurolla; Michał Piróg; Weronika Marczuk-Pazura	No	16	3	Top 6
2	Spring 2008 (March–June)	Wednesday 9.30 p.m (1–13); Thursday 9.30 p.m. (14)	Kinga Rusin	Agustin Egurolla; Michał Piróg; Weronika Marczuk-Pazura	Yes	16	3	Top 6
3	Autumn 2008 (September–December)	Wednesday 9.30 p.m	Kinga Rusin	Agustin Egurolla; Michał Piróg; Weronika Marczuk-Pazura	Yes	16	3	Top 6
4	Spring 2009 (March–June)	Wednesday 9.30 p.m (1–12); Wednesday 8.50 p.m. (13)	Kinga Rusin	Agustin Egurolla; Michał Piróg; Weronika Marczuk-Pazura	No	16	2	Top 6
5	Spring 2010 (March–June)	Wednesday 9.30 p.m	Kinga Rusin	Agustin Egurolla; Michał Piróg; Anna Mucha	Yes	14	2	Top 6
6	Spring 2011 (March–June)	Wednesday 9.30 p.m	Patricia Kazadi	Agustin Egurolla; Michał Piróg; Kinga Rusin	Yes	14	2	Top 6
7	Spring 2012 (March–June)	Wednesday 9.30 p.m	Patricia Kazadi	Agustin Egurolla; Michał Piróg; Kinga Rusin	No	14	2	Top 6
8	Spring 2015 (March–June)	Monday 9.30 p.m	Patricia Kazadi	Agustin Egurolla; Michał Piróg; Kinga Rusin	No	14	2	Top 6
9	Spring 2016 (February–May)	Wednesday 9.30 p.m	Patricia Kazadi	Agustin Egurrola; Michał Piróg; Maciej "Gleba" Florek; Ida Nowakowska	No	14	2	Top 6
10	Spring 2025 (February–April)	Wednesday 8.50 p.m	Maciej Dowbor	Bartosz Porczyk; Mery Spolsky; Michał Danilczuk; Ryfa Ri	No	To be determined

=== Differences from the original So You Think You Can Dance ===
While basically similar in format to the American version of the show it is based upon, the Polish version of the show is different in a few respects. For example, Po prostu tańcz! has never featured a results show that is separate from the main weekly performance show, as the American version did in seasons 2–8 and as such the Polish show has not featured musical guests and only rarely presents guest or returning dancers. Po prostu tańcz! also features a smaller overall cast—the callbacks have been limited to a mere 36 to 50 dancers (depending on the season), as compared to numbers regularly over a hundred and even approaching two hundred in the U.S. "Vegas Week" and the number of finalists in the Polish show are numbered 14 or 16, as opposed to the American version's typical Top 20. Lastly, Po prostu tańcz! employs a judge's panel made up entirely of permanent members and has featured only one guest judge (Izabela Miko) on one occasion.

== Dance Styles and Choreographers ==
Over the course of its seven seasons, You Can Dance – Po Prostu Tańcz! has featured dozens of distinct dance styles in its choreographed routines. Most of these styles fall into four categories that are regularly showcased and can be found in almost every performance episode: western contemporary/classical styles, ballroom styles, hip-hop/street styles, and Jazz and its related styles. Various other forms of dance that do not especially fall into these broad categories are seen as well, but not as regularly. The following styles have all been seen in a choreographed duet or group routine; styles featured only in auditions or solos are not listed.

=== Classical Styles ===
Routines from the classically derived style of contemporary dance are the most common dances seen on the show, being seen in every performance episode of the series. While contemporary, lyrical, and modern dance are typically considered three separate (if overlapping) styles, has been to refer to all routines in this area as "contemporary". Ballet routines have occurred much more rarely, being seen only in seasons 2 and 3.

Genre	Styles
Western Classical styles
Western Classical styles	Contemporary, Lyrical, Modern, ballet, Modern Underground
Choreographers
Mariusz Olszewski, Katarzyna Kizior, Karolina Kroczak, Ksena Audrey, Geneviève Dorion-Coupal, Jonathan Huor, Stefanie Bland, Yoram Karmi, Wojciech Mochniej, Thierry Verger, Zofia Rudnicka, Nadia Ira Kodiche, Andrzej Morawiec, Elżbieta and Grzegorz Pańtak

=== Street and Club Styles ===
Hip-hop routines are also present in every performance episode.

Genre	Styles
Street and Contemporary Club Styles
Street and Contemporary Club Styles	Hip-hop, Popping, Locking, Lyrical Hip-hop, Krump, Waacking, Vogue, House, Dancehall, Reggaeton, Ragga, Ragga Jam, Hip-Hop L.A. Style, New Style
Choreographers
Justyna Lichacy, Anna Jujka, Anthony Kaye, Rafał "Roofi" Kamiński, Piotr "GaUa" Gałczyński, Marcin Mrożiński, Tomasz Prządka, Filip Czeszyk, Krzesztof Mazur, Krzysztof "Soda" Rudziński, David Hernandez Sanchez, Mariusz Mikołajek, Wojciech Kuczyński, Kelechi Onyele, Viet Dang, Eva Nitsch, Maria Foryś, Federica Neclerio, Gabriel Francisco, Diana Staniszewska, Caterina Felicioni, Joao Assuncao, Aziz Baki, Steve Bolton, Wojciech "Blacha" Blaszko, Daniel Celebe, Candice Brown, Romeo "Freedom" Ballayn, Matt Cady, Cass Smith, Dominic Lawrence, Antonio Baterina, Kwame "Big Wave" Osei, Agnieszka Bota, Ilona Bekier, Gigi Torres

=== Ballroom Styles ===
Ballroom styles are also seen usually in every performance episode until the Top 6.

Genre	Styles
Standard/Smooth Ballroom styles
Standard/Smooth Ballroom styles	Foxtrot, Tango, Argentine Tango, Quickstep, Waltz, Viennese Waltz
Latin/Rhythm Ballroom styles
Latin/Rhythm Ballroom styles	Jive, Mambo, Paso Doble, Rumba, Salsa, Samba
Choreographers
Maciej Zaklczyński, Joanna Szokalska, Janja Lesar & Krzysztof Hulboj, Jan Kliment, Michał Malitowski, Monika Grzelak and Przemysław Wereszczyński, Adam Król, Piotr Wożniak, Jacek Gumienny, Jhesus Aponte, Konrad and Joanna Dąbski, Arkadiusz Pavlovic, Brian van der Kust, Cris de la Pena,

=== Jazz, Broadway, and Musical Theater Styles ===
Jazz is featured in nearly all performance episodes. While these routines are typically labelled simply "Jazz", the genre is notable as being one of the most fusional featured on the show and various style combinations and sub-categories have been referenced.

Genre	Styles
Jazz Styles
Jazz Styles	Jazz, Modern Jazz, Lyrical Jazz, Afro Jazz, Pop-Jazz/Pop
Broadway
Broadway	Broadway
Choreographers
Jacek Wazelin, Piotr Jagielski, Paweł Michno, Katarzyna Kizior, Elżbieta Pańtak, Eva Nitsch, Maria Foryś, Natalia Madejczyk, Katarzyna Kizior, Jonathan Huor, Izabela Orzełowska, Geneviève Dorion-Coupal, Stefanie Bland, Karolina Kroczak, Matthew Tseng, Mariusz Olszewkski, Luciano di Natale

=== Regional/Traditional Styles ===
In addition to the broad categories above, many more styles that are less common in the Poland are sometimes featured.

Genre	Styles
Regional/Traditional Styles
Regional/Traditional Styles	Belly dance, Capoira
Choreographers
Jasmine Mazloum, Dominika Rembelska & Natalia Madejczyk

== Finalists ==
Male contestant	Female contestant	Spring season	Fall season

Season	Year(s)	Winner	Runner-up	3rd place	Host	Judges
1	2007	Maciej "Gleba" Florek (contemporary)	Rafał "Roofi" Kamiński (hip-hop)	Anna Bosak (ballroom)	Kinga Rusin	Augustin Egurola; Michał Piróg; Weronika Marczuk-Pazura
2	2008	Artur Cieciórski (hip-hop)	Katarzyna Kubalska (ballet)	Kryspin Hermański (ballet/contemporary)	Kinga Rusin	Augustin Egurola; Michał Piróg; Weronika Marczuk-Pazura
3	2008	Wioletta Fiuk (contemporary)	Gabriel Piotrowski (hip-hop)	Marcin Mroziński (contemporary/hip-hop)	Kinga Rusin	Augustin Egurola; Michał Piróg; Weronika Marczuk-Pazura
4	2009	Anna Kapera (ballet)	Łukasz Zięba (jazz)	—N/a	Kinga Rusin	Augustin Egurola; Michał Piróg; Weronika Marczuk-Pazura
5	2010	Jakub Jóźwiak (contemporary/jazz)	Paulina Figińska (contemporary)	—N/a	Kinga Rusin	Augustin Egurolla; Michał Piróg; Anna Mucha
6	2011	Dominik Olechowski (contemporary/hip-hop)	Paulina Przestrzelska (hip-hop)	—N/a	Patricia Kazadi	Augustin Egurolla; Michał Piróg; Kinga Rusin
7	2012	Brian Poniatowski (contemporary)	Anna Matlewska (contemporary)	—N/a	Patricia Kazadi	Augustin Egurolla; Michał Piróg; Kinga Rusin
8	2015	Mateusz Sobecko (hip-hop)	Natalia Gap (contemporary)	—N/a	Patricia Kazadi	Augustin Egurolla; Michał Piróg; Kinga Rusin
9	2016	Stefano Silvino (contemporary)	Aleksandra Borkowska (jazz)	—N/a	Patricia Kazadi	Augustin Egurolla; Michał Piróg; Maciej Florek; Ida Nowakowska
10	2025	Upcoming season			Maciej Dowbor	Bartosz Porczyk; Mery Spolsky; Michał Danilczuk; Ryfa Ri

== Seasons ==
=== Season 1 ===
The first season premiered 5 September 2007. Auditions were held in Bytom, Wrocław, Poznań, Gdańsk, and Warsaw. 50 of these Contestants were then sent to "Choreography Camp" in Paris, France, the last round of which featured special guest choreographer Wade Robson who taught the remaining finalists a pop-jazz routine from the third season of So You Think You Can Dance entitled "Cabaret Hoover," originally from "Les Triplettes de Belleville." From these dancers, a top 16 was selected and in the following weeks, during the main competition, two dancers (one guy and one girl) were voted off each week until the semi-finals, which eliminated only one dancer. Maciej "Gleba" Florek was announced winner during the 2 December 2007 finale.

=== Season 2 ===
The second season premiered 5 March 2008. Auditions were held in: Bytom, Kraków, Gdańsk and Warsaw. 36 Contestants were advanced to the Choreography Camp stage (held this year in Buenos Aires, Argentina). The special guest choreographer for season two was Marty Kudelka. Artur Ciecórski was announced as winner during the 5 June 2008 finale.

=== Season 3 ===
Season 3 premiered 3 September 2008. Auditions were being held in: Szczecin, Kraków, Wrocław and Warsaw. Choreography Camp in Barcelona, Spain, again with 36 contestant and featuring special guest choreographer Brian Friedman. Wioletta Fiuk was announced as winner during a 2 December 2008 finale.

=== Season 4 ===
Season 4 premiered 4 March 2009. Auditions were held in: Wrocław, Kraków, Gdańsk, Białystok and Warsaw. 36 advanced to Choreography Camp in Lisbon, Portugal with guest choreographer Laurie Ann Gibson. Anna Kapera was announced as winner during the 5 June 2009 finale

=== Season 5 ===
Season 5 premiered 3 March 2010. Auditions were held in: Wrocław, Poznań, Gdańsk, Kraków and Warsaw. 36 contestants advanced to Choreography Camp in Tel Aviv, Israel with special guest choreographer was Travis Payne.

=== Season 6 ===
Season 6 premiered on 2 March 2011. Auditions were held in: Gdańsk, Lublin, Wrocław, Kraków and Warsaw in December 2010 and January 2011. 36 Contestants advanced to Choreography Camp in Casablanca, Morocco. This season featured a Top 14, rather than the Top 16 of all previous seasons. After 8 weeks of competition, Dominik Olechowski was announced winner and was awarded a prize of a 3-month scholarship at Broadway Dance Centre and 100.000 PLN.

=== Season 7 ===
Season 7 was announced 25 November 2011. Auditions took place in December 2011 and January 2012 in Kraków, Lublin, Szczecin, Gdańsk and Warsaw. The season premiered in March 2012.

=== Season 8 ===
On 12 November 2014, it was announced that You Can Dance – Po Prostu Tańcz! would return to TVN for its eighth series in 2015.

=== Season 9 ===
On 27 November 2015 it was announced You Can Dance – Po Prostu Tańcz! will return for its ninth series in 2016.

=== Season 10 ===
On 23 October 2024 it was announced You Can Dance – Po Prostu Tańcz! will return for its tenth series in 26 February 2025 – 23 Apil 2025

== You Can Dance 4fun and You Can Dance Mix ==
=== You Can Dance 4fun ===
You Can Dance 4fun is a companion show that is broadcast on music channel 4fun.tv on Wednesdays at 21:00, before the main show on TVN. It features behind-the-scenes footage of You Can Dance – Po Prostu Tańcz! and the preparations for the show. It is presented by Jacek Januszko, auditionee of series 5 of the show, who now works as a presenter on 4fun.tv.

=== You Can Dance Mix ===
You Can Dance Mix is another spin-off show that features the contestants of You Can Dance – Po Prostu Tańcz!. It aires on 4fun.tv at 23:10, after the main TVN show. The contestants who were eliminated last week are back to set their own music charts. Viewers can also ask them questions by sending an SMS.

== Special season ==
=== Po prostu taniec – Just Dance ===
On 9 December 2007 TVN aired a special episode of Po Prostu taniec – So You Think You Can Dance and Taniec z Gwiazdami. 4 stars with 6th season Taniec z Gwiazdami and 4 dancer with 1st season So You Think You Can Dance have danced. Judges: Michał Piróg (from You Can Dance), Augustin Egurolla (from You Can Dance), Iwona Pavlowicz (from Dancing with the stars), Piotr Galiński (from Dancing with the stars). Show was presented by Kinga Rusin (winner 4th edition Dancing with the stars, You Can Dance presenter), Piotr Gąsowski (Dancing with the Stars presenter) and Katarzyna Skrzynecka (Dancing with the Stars presenter).

- Judges:
  - Augustin Egruolla – So You Think You Can Dance
  - Michał Piróg – So You Think You Can Dance
  - Iwona Pavlović – Dancing with the Stars
  - Piotr Galiński – Dancing with the Stars
- Presenters:
  - Kinga Rusin – So You Think You Can Dance
  - Katarzyna Skrzynecka – Dancing with the Stars
  - Piotr Gąsowski – Dancing with the Stars
- Musical Guests:
  - Isis Gee

No	Team	Dance	Music	Points jury	Place
1	Rafał Bryndal & Diana Staniszewska	Jive	"I Get Around" – Beach Boys	18 (5,5,4,4)	4. place
1	Rafał Bryndal & Diana Staniszewska	Pop	"Thriller" – Michael Jackson	31 (5,6,10,10)	4. place
2	Anna Guzik & Rafał Kamiński	Tango	"Libertango" – Ástor Piazzolla	24 (7,5,6,6)	1. place
2	Anna Guzik & Rafał Kamiński	Hip-Hop	"Yeah" – Usher	39 (9,10,10,10)	1. place
3	Mateusz Damięcki & Anna Bosak	Waltz	"Imagine" – John Lennon	34 (7,8,9,10)	2. place
3	Mateusz Damięcki & Anna Bosak	Jazz	"When You're Gone" – Avril Lavigne	33 (8,10,7,8)	2. place
4	Justyna Steczkowska & Maciej Florek	Tango	"Et Si Tu N'Existais Pas" – Toto Cutugno & Delanoë	17 (4,5,5,3)	3. place
4	Justyna Steczkowska & Maciej Florek	Modern	"Bring me to life" – Evanescence	39 (9,10,10,10)	3. place

Audience voting results

Anna & Rafał
Mateusz & Anna
Justyna & Maciej
Rafał & Diana

=== Po Prostu Bitwa! (Just Battle!) (5 June 2010) ===
This episode was live from Białystok. There were two teams – Male and Female. Male team leader was Michał Piróg and Female team Anna Mucha. From 7 to 12 April on You Can Dance – Po Prostu Tańcz website was uploaded short movies. Later on 12 May 2010 Judges Picked 72 Dancers. Then on 15 May Judges Picked 48 Dancers. Then short films was uploaded and internauts voted. They picked 24 dancers (12 Male and 12 Female). 29.05 – 4.06 on these days were rehearsals to performance. On this episode this season top 14 performed twice. There was also Dancemob. It was danced by every person on audience. The movie with Pop choreography was published on official YCD website around month before event

- Judges: Katarzyna Skrzynecka, Piotr Gąsowski, Joanna Chitruszko
- Dancemob: Hit The Floor – Afromental – Pop
- You Can Dance Top 14's Group Dances:

Dancers	Style	Music	Choreographer
Top 14	Afro Jazz	Creator — Santigold	Gigi Torres
Top 14	Hip-Hop	OMG – Usher ft. will.i.am	Candice Brown

- Musical Guests:
  - Afromental – Radio Song
  - Agnieszka Chylińska – Nie Mogę Cię Zapomnieć
  - Afromental – The Bomb
- Female group:
  - Ida Nowakowska (season 1)
  - Justyna Białowąs (season 2)
  - Izabela Orzełowska (season 3)
  - Paulina Jaksim (season 3)
  - Adrianna Kawecka (season 3)
  - Adrianna Piechówka (season 4)
  - Aleksandra Chaberska (Biała Podlaska)
  - Agnieszka Miś (Dąbrowa Górnicza)
  - Magdalena Tyburska (Płock)
  - Ewelina Tomaszewicz (Suwałki)
  - Patrycja Kozłowska (Białystok)
  - Dominika Semeniuk (Piła)
  - Maja Krajewska (Bydgoszcz)
  - Luiza Smagowska (Radom)
  - Joanna Kolk (Działdowo)
  - Nicol Kupper (Kościerzyna)
  - Sylwia Murdzek (Pińczów)
  - Joanna Sokół (Skwierzyna)
- Male group:
  - Jakub Mędzrzycki (season 3)
  - Michał Pawłowski(season 3)
  - Tomasz Prządka (season 3)
  - Marcin Mrożiński (season 3)
  - Jakub Werel (season 4)
  - Damian Lipiński (Pabianice)
  - Mateusz Adamczyk (Leszno)
  - Jakub Kolasa (Ostrowiec Świętokrzyski)
  - Łukasz Kosicki (Bydgoszcz)
  - Maciej Kosicki (Bydgoszcz)
  - Mieszko Nagaj (Sanok)
  - Rafał Roczniak (Tuchów)
  - Kamil Rybiński (Radom)
  - Mateusz Włoch (Białe Błota)
  - Rafał Szłyk (Wodzisław Śląski)
  - Kajetan Luteracki (Łódź)
  - Jakub Kornalski (Konin)

=== Taniec kontra Dance (Dance vs. Dance!) (11 June 2011) ===
This episode was live from Białystok. There were two teams – professional dancers from Dancing with the Stars (Taniec z Gwiazdam) and You Can Dance: Po prostu tańcz! dancers. DWTS team leader was Rafał Maserak (DWTS dancer) and YCD team Patricia Kazadi (YCD presenter). Piotr Gąsowski (DWTS presenter) was the presenter this show.

- Judges:
  - Michał Piróg – So You Think You Can Dance
  - Maja Sablewska – X Factor
  - Piotr Galiński – Dancing with the Stars
- Musical Guests: X Factor finalists:
  - William Malcolm – "Mercy"
  - Ada Szulc – "Don't Stop the Music"
  - Michał Szpak – "I Don't Wanna Miss a Thing"
- Contestants:
- You Can Dance Group:
  - Ilona Bekier (season 5)
  - Ada Kawecka (season 3)
  - Klaudia Koruba (season 4)
  - Anna Kapera (season 4 WINNER)
  - Maria Foryś (season 1)
  - Leal Zielińska (season 5)
  - Marcin Mroziński (season 3)
  - Karol Niecikowski (season 3)
  - Tomasz Prządka (season 3)
  - Adam Kościelniak (season 5)
  - Aleksander Paliński (season 5)
  - Rafał Kamiński (season 1)
- Dancing with the Stars Group:
  - Izabela Janachowska (season 9–12)
  - Janja Lesar (season 8–10,12)
  - Anna Głogowska (season 1–3,7–8,10–12)
  - Magdalena Soszyńska-Michno (season 1–3,5–9,11–12)
  - Paulina Biernat (season 11)
  - Nina Tyrka (season 7 & 12)
  - Robert Rowiński (season 3–4,6,11–12)
  - Jan Kliment (season 10–12)
  - Stefano Terrazzino (season 4–6,8,11)
  - Krzysztof Hulboj (season 8–10,12)
  - Michał Uryniuk (season 7)
  - Cezary Olszewski (season 7–10,12)
- Special performance: So You Think You Can Dance (Poland) (season 6) TOP 14:Yeah 3x – Chris Brown (Hip-Hop);Choreographer: Matt Cady
- Contest Performances:

Round	Team/Dancers	Dance	Music	Choreographer
1 (Own Choice Dances)	Dancing with the Stars Team	Salsa/Samba	Gloria Estefan – "Conga" performed by Adam Sztaba's orchestra	Jan Kliment
1 (Own Choice Dances)	You Can Dance Team	Hip-Hop	Let's Go – Travis Barker, ft. Busta Rhymes, Lil Jon, Twista & Yelawolf	Rałał "Roofi" Kamiński
2 (Style Chosen by Opposite Team)	Dancing with the Stars Team	Hip-Hop	Run the World (Girls) – Beyoncé	Sylwia Kuczyńska
2 (Style Chosen by Opposite Team)	You Can Dance Team	Cha-cha-cha	A Little Less Conversation (JXL Radio Edit Remix) – Elvis Presley	Mariusz Olszewski
3 (Battle)	Both teams	Ballroom/Hip-Hop	Picture Perfect – Chris Brown	Dancers
4 (Dances by Team Leaders)	Patricia Kazadi (YCD team leader) & Rafal "Roofi" Kamiński	Hip-Hop	What's My Name – Rihanna ft. Drake	Rafał "Roofi" Kamiński
4 (Dances by Team Leaders)	Rafał Maserak (DWTS team leader) & Magdalena Soszyńska-Michno	Cha-cha-cha	Hit the Road Jack – Ray Charles/S&M – Rihanna	Rafał Maserak; Magdalena Soszyńska-Michno

- Results:

1st place: Dancing with the Stars team 2nd place: You Can Dance team

== Ratings ==
Episode	Season 1	Season 2	Season 3	Season 4	Season 5	Season 6	Season 7	Season 8	Season 9	10 season
1	2,585,169 (5 September 2007)	3,077,507 (5 March 2008)	2,362,818 (3 September 2008)	(4 March 2009)	3,299,051 (3 March 2010)	3,074,536 (2 March 2011)	2,594,005 (7 March 2012)	2,124,225 (2 March 2015)	1,410,880 (17 February 2016)	(26 February 2025)
2	3,005,117 (12 September 2007)	3,527,331 (12 March 2008)	2,464,142 (10 September 2008)	(11 March 2009)	4,132,714 (10 March 2010)	3,376,435 (9 March 2011)	3,002,020 (14 March 2012)	1,876,513 (9 March 2015)	1,590,134 (24 February 2016)	(5 March 2025)
3	3,157,210 (19 September 2007)	3,685,660 (19 March 2008)	3,132,212 (17 September 2008)	(18 March 2009)	3,729,185 (17 March 2010)	3,240,345 (16 March 2011)	2,621,402 (21 March 2012)	2,102,143 (16 March 2015)	1,390,794 (2 March 2016)	(12 March 2025)
4	2,839,520 (26 September 2007)	2,965,419 (26 March 2008)	2,995,715 (24 September 2008)	2,916,761 (25 March 2009)	3,425,014 (24 March 2010)	3,296,694 (23 March 2011)	(28 March 2012)	1,930,773 (23 March 2015)	1,599,617 (9 March 2016)	(19 March 2025)
5	2,354,477 (3 October 2007)	3,168,673 (2 April 2008)	3,139,541 (1 October 2008)	2,378,640 (1 April 2009)	3,320,209 (31 March 2010)	3,162,112 (30 March 2011)	2,839,797 (4 April 2012)	(30 March 2015)	(16 March 2016)	(26 March 2025)
6	2,436,386 (10 October 2007)	3,267,513 (9 April 2008)	3,790,015 (8 October 2008)	2,523,118 (8 April 2009)	3,212,078 (7 April 2010)	3,116,088 (6 April 2011)	2,767,210 (11 April 2012)	(6 April 2015)	(23 March 2016)	(2 Apil 2025)
7	2,752,179 (17 October 2007)	3,135,031 (16 April 2008)	3,393,677 (15 October 2008)	2,318,115 (22 April 2009)	2,720,927 (21 April 2010)	3,047,739 (13 April 2011)	(18 April 2012)	(13 April 2015)	1,434,925 (30 March 2016)	(9 Apil 2025)
8	2,717,525 (24 October 2007)	2,949,739 (23 April 2008)	2,983,528 (22 October 2008)	2,404,531 (29 April 2009)	2,378,343 (28 April 2010)	2,352,393 (20 April 2011)	(25 April 2012)	(20 April 2015)	(6 April 2016)	(16 Apil 2025)
9	2,710,372 (31 October 2007)	2,616,401 (30 April 2008)	2,609,340 (29 October 2008)	2,195,119 (6 May 2009)	2,727,223 (5 May 2010)	2,294,207 (27 April 2011)	(2 May 2012)	(27 April 2015)	(13 April 2016)	(23 Apil 2025)
10	3,149,694 (7 November 2007)	2,692,353 (7 May 2008)	2,691,547 (5 November 2008)	2,101,043 (13 May 2009)	2,540,376 (12 May 2010)	2,512,383 (4 May 2011)	(9 May 2012)	(4 May 2015)	(20 April 2016)	–
11	3,192,178 (14 November 2007)	2,741,304 (14 May 2008)	3,625,397 (12 November 2008)	2,195,767 (20 May 2009)	2,744,185 (19 May 2010)	2,497,440 (11 May 2011)	(16 May 2012)	(11 May 2015)	(27 April 2016)	–
12	2,876,019 (21 November 2007)	2,525,034 (21 May 2008)	2,970,667 (19 November 2008)	2,151,985 (27 May 2009)	3,013,932 (26 May 2010)	2,497,440 (18 May 2011)	(23 May 2012)	(18 May 2015)	(4 May 2016)	–
13	4,386,793 (2 December 2007)	3,020,502 (28 May 2008)	3,523,767 (26 November 2008)	2,628,383 (3 June 2009)	2,827,035 (2 June 2010)	2,344,082 (25 May 2011)	(30 May 2012)	(25 May 2015)	(13 May 2016)	–
14	–	3,196,605 (5 June 2008)	2,970,536 (3 December 2008)	–	–	2,414,215 (1 June 2011)	2,610,337 (6 June 2012)	(1 June 2015)	(20 May 2016)	–
Average	2,959,699	2,999,123	2,765,374	2,510,193	2,997,082	2,687,398	2,547,665	1,688,444	1,315,849	1 314 850

=== Special series ===
Episode	Official rating 4+
Po prostu taniec (Just Dance) (9 December 2007)	4,960,174
Po prostu tańcz z gwiazdami (30 June 2008)	1 311 081
Po prostu Bitwa (Just Battle)! (5 June 2010)	1 557 398

== See also ==
- Dance on television

=== Similar shows ===
- The Ultimate Dance Battle
- Live to Dance/Got to Dance
- America's Best Dance Crew
- Superstars of Dance
- Dance India Dance
- Se Ela Dança, Eu Danço
