= You Can Dance – Po Prostu Tańcz! season 4 =

You Can Dance – Po Prostu Tańcz!
- Season 4
- Hosted by: Kinga Rusin
- Judges: Agustin Egurrola; Michał Piróg; Weronika Marczuk-Pazura
- Winner: Anna Kapera
- Runner-up: Łukasz Zięba

Release
- Original network: TVN, TVN HD
- Original release: March 4 – June 5, 2009

Season chronology
- ← Previous; Season 3 Next → Season 5

The fourth season of You Can Dance: Po prostu tańcz!. The dancers compete to win PLN 100,000 and a 3-month scholarship in dance school Broadway Dance Center, but first they have to go through auditions. Later, 36 contestants do the workshops abroad – this season in Lisbon, Portugal. This seasons on choreography camp special guest choreographer was Laurie Ann Gibson. From sixteen people, two dancers are eliminated in each episode, to the final episode that features the two contestants. The show is hosted by Kinga Rusin. The judges are Agustin Egurrola, Michał Piróg and Weronika Marczuk-Pazura. It premiered on 4 March 2009. Anna Kapera was announced as the winner on 5 June 2009.

== Auditions ==
Season Background Song: Poker Face – Lady Gaga
Open auditions for this season were held in the following locations:

- Wrocław
- Kraków
- Gdańsk
- Białystok
- Warsaw

The song during Sneek Peeks at the end of the episode is Just Lose It – Eminem

=== Top 36 dancers ===
During the auditions judges picked 36 dancers. These dancers were taking part in choreography camp in Lisboa, Portugal.

City	Dancer	Age	Style	Number of dancers	Number of top 16 dancers
Wrocław	Mieszko Wiśniewski	19	Hip-Hop/Jazz	7	3
Wrocław	Julia Żytko^{3}	16	Hip-Hop/Jazz	7	3
Wrocław	Jurij Żurajew	24	Ballroom	7	3
Wrocław	Mateusz Agiejczyk	22	Breakdance	7	3
Wrocław	Brajan Poniatowski	19	Contemporary	7	3
Wrocław	Marika Netzel^{1}	17	Hip-Hop	7	3
Wrocław	Krzysztof Kulling^{1}	17	Hip-Hop	7	3
Kraków	Łukasz Zięba	17	Contemporary	9	5
Kraków	Barbara Zielińska	24	Modern/Salsa	9	5
Kraków	Anna Kasprzak	23	Contemporary	9	5
Kraków	Paweł Olewiński^{1}	20	Contemporary	9	5
Kraków	Jakub Werel^{1}	19	Hip-Hop/Dancehall/Voughing	9	5
Kraków	Adrianna Piechówka^{1}	17	Ballroom	9	5
Kraków	Kaja Kudełko^{1}	16	Hip-Hop	9	5
Kraków	Łukasz Szotko^{1}		Hip-Hop	9	5
Kraków	Sylwia Dymek^{1}		Hip-Hop	9	5
Gdańsk	Michalina Twarowska	19	Hip-Hop/Salsa	4	1
Gdańsk	Sylwia Jarzyńska^{3}	17	Contemporary	4	1
Gdańsk	Ewa Radew^{3}	18	Jazz	4	1
Gdańsk	Maksymilian Hać	17	Hip-Hop/Popping	4	1
Białystok	Rafał Kabungwe	19	Ballroom/Hip-Hop	6	4
Białystok	Eliza Kindziuk^{3}	17	Contemporary	6	4
Białystok	Anna Kapera	25	Ballet	6	4
Białystok	Piotr Jeznach	19	Hip-Hop	6	4
Białystok	Adrian Wilczko^{1}	21	Ballroom	6	4
Białystok	Piotr Dąbrowski^{1}		Ballroom	6	4
Warsaw	Paweł Kulik	24	Breakdance/Contemporary	10	3
Warsaw	Martyna "Majka" Majak	22	Jazz	10	3
Warsaw	Klaudia "Jadżka" Koruba	22	Hip-Hop	10	3
Warsaw	Paulina Figińska	17	Contemporary	10	3
Warsaw	Magdalena Grzela^{3}	25	Ballroom	10	3
Warsaw	Krystian Waszkiewicz	19	Breakdance	10	3
Warsaw	Anna Szymoniak	23	Jazz/Pop	10	3
Warsaw	Jakub Konieczny^{1}^{3}	20	Ballroom/Jazz	10	3
Warsaw	Piotr Abramowicz^{1}		Hip-Hop	10	3
Warsaw	Katarzyna Wach^{1}	19	Ballet	10	3
Total number of tickets to Lisbona					36

^1These dancers were shown only in youcandance.tvn.pl website extras. ^2These dancers weren't shown anywhere. ^3These dancers earned the tickets after choreography round.

=== Returning Dancers ===
This season there were some returning dancers, who were trying their chances last seasons.

Dancer	Age	Style	Previous attempt(s)	This season Result
Mieszko Wiśniewski	19	Hip-Hop/Jazz	Season 3; Top 36	Top 16
Julia Żytko	16	Hip-Hop/Jazz	Season 2; Audition	Top 4
Krzysztof Kulling	17	Hip-Hop	Season 3; Audition (Choreography Round)	Final Choreography round
Barbara Zielińska	24	Modern/Salsa	Season 2; Final Choreography round (Dance for live)	Top 16
Adrianna Piechówka	17	Ballroom	Season 3; Final Choreography round (Dance for live)	Top 12
Ewa Radew	18	Jazz	Season 2; Top 36	Final Choreography round
Rafał Kabungwe	19	Hip-Hop/Ballroom	Season 1; Top 50	Top 10
Anna Kapera	25	Ballet	Season 1; Audition (Choreography round)	Winner
Piotr Jeznach	19	Hip-Hop	Season 3; Audition (Choreography round)	Top 4
Paweł Kulik	24	Breakdance/Contemporary	Season 3; Final Choreography round	Top 6
Anna Szymoniak	23	Jazz/Pop	Season 1; Top 50	Top 14

== Choreography Camp (Lizbona) week ==
Judges: Agustin Egurrola, Weronika Marczuk-Pazura, Michał Piróg

Task/style	Music	Choreographer(s)
Hip-Hop	I Don't Like The Look of It – Da Backwudz	Filip Czeszyk
Salsa	Magalenha – Sergio Mendez	Joanna Szokalska & Brian van der Kust
Breakdance	Squeeze Me – Kraak & Smaak	Omar "Roxrite" Delgado
Modern Underground	Invaders Must Die – The Prodigy	Thierry Verger
Final Choreography	Love Game – Lady Gaga	Laurie Ann Gibson

=== Eliminations during Choreography Camp ===
- Dancers were practising choreographies during first three days of the Camp. Then there were no cuts, judges gave some dancers, who didn't handle the choreographies well yellow cards, second yellow equals red card.
- After rehearsals contestants performed only in chosen by choreographer style, then judges made cuts.
- After these cuts remaining contestants moved to Final Choreography round with special guest star Laurie Ann Gibson

Cuts after first round: Marika Netzel, Anna Kasprzak, Paulina Figińska, Mateusz Agiejczyk, Sylwia Jarzyńska, Krystian Waszkiewicz, Brajan Poniatowski, Paweł Olewiński, Sylwia Dymek, Adrian Wilczko, Katarzyna Wach, Łukasz Szotko, Piotr Dąbrowski. Cuts after Final Choreography round: Anna Szymoniak^{1}, Piotr Abramowicz, Ewa Radew, Krzysztof Kulling, Magdalena Grzela.
Cuts after dancing for live: Michalina Twarowska, Martyna Majak, Jakub Konieczny.

^1 Anna Szymoniak was cut after Final Choreography round, but because of low level solos at dancing for live she was asked to perform her solo, and she moved to the top 16.

== Top 16 Contestants ==
=== Women ===
Finalist	Age	Home Town	Dance Specialty	Elimination date
Anna Kapera	25	Trzcianka	Ballet	Winner
Julia Żytko	16	Jastrzębie-Zdrój	Hip-Hop	27 May 2009
Klaudia "Jadźka" Koruba	22	Koszalin	Hip-Hop/Dancehall	20 May 2009
Eliza Kindziuk	17	Siedlce	Contemporary/Jazz	13 May 2009
Kaja Kudełko	16	Kraków	Hip-Hop	6 May 2009
Adrianna Piechówka	18	Wieliczka	Ballroom	29 April 2009
Anna Szymoniak	24	Łódź	Jazz	22 April 2009
Barbara Zielińska	24	Warsaw	Salsa/Contemporary	8 April 2008

=== Men ===
Finalist	Age	Home Town	Dance Specialty	Elimination date
Łukasz Zięba	18	Kraków	Jazz/Contemporary	Runner-up
Piotr Jeznach	20	Mońki	Hip-Hop	27 May 2009
Paweł Kulik	24	Otwock	Breakdance	20 May 2009
Jakub Werel	18	Gdańsk	Hip-Hop/Dancehall	13 May 2009
Rafał Kabungwe	19	Olsztyn	Hip-Hop/Ballroom	6 May 2009
Maksymilian Hać	17	Łódź	Hip-Hop/Popping	29 April 2009
Jurij Żurajew	24	Kyiv, Ukraine	Ballroom	22 April 2009
Mieszko Wiśniewski	19	Poznań	Hip-Hop/Jazz	8 April 2009

== Elimination chart ==
Key:
Female	Male	Bottom 3 Couples	Eliminated	Did not perform due to injury	Withdrew	Winner	Runner-up

	Week:	04/08	04/22	04/29	05/06	05/13	05/20	05/27	06/05
	Contestant	Result							
Final Top 2	Anna Kapera			Btm 3					WINNER
Final Top 2	Łukasz Zięba			Btm 3	Btm 3	Btm 3			Runner-up
Top 4	Piotr Jeznach							Elim	
Top 4	Julia Żytko		Btm 3			Btm 3		Elim	
Top 6	Paweł Kulik	Btm 3				Btm 3	Elim		
Top 6	Klaudia "Jadźka" Koruba	Btm 3	Btm 3		Btm 3	Btm 3	Elim		
Top 8	Jakub Werel				Btm 3	Elim			
Top 8	Eliza Kindziuk				Btm 3	Elim			
Top 10	Rafał Kabungwe		Btm 3	Btm 3	Elim				
Top 10	Kaja Kudełko			Btm 3	Elim				
Top 12	Maksymilian Hać	Btm 3	Btm 3	Elim					
Top 12	Adrianna Piechówka			Elim					
Top 14	Jurij Żurajew		Elim						
Top 14	Anna Szymoniak	Btm 3	Elim						
Top 16	Mieszko Wiśniewski	Elim							
Top 16	Barbara Zielińska	Elim							

== Performance nights ==
=== Week 1: Top 16 (8 April 2009) ===
- Group Dance: Deep Inside — Masters at Work/I Don't Like The Look of This – Da Backwudz (House/Hip-Hop; Choreographer: Filip Czeszyk)
- Guest Dancers:
  - Maciej "Gleba Florek & Anna Bosak, Artur Ciecórski & Katarzyna Kubalska, Wioletta Fiuk & Gabriel Piotrowski (Finalists of previous series) – Freedom – George Michael
  - Rafał "Roofi" Kamiński, Ida Nowakowska, Natalia Madejczyk, Anna Bosak, Maria Foryś Maciej "Gleba" Florek, Artur Ciecórski, Wioletta Fiuk – Yahiii, Yahaiieee – Magda Miton & Afromental/Fight For Your Life – Afromental & Andy Stewlocks Ninvall
- Top 16 Couple dances:

Couple	Style	Music	Choreographer(s)	Results
Anna Kapera; Jurij Żurajew	Broadway	Spider-Man – Michael Bublé	Jacek Wazelin	Safe
Jakub Werel; Kaja Kudełka	Dance hall	Hit The Floor – Big Ali & Dollarman	Maria Foryś (season 1)	Safe
Barbara Zielińska; Mieszko Wiśniewski	Salsa	Baila — Jennifer Lopez	Konrad Dąbski	Both Eliminated
Julia Żytko; Piotr Jeznach	Hip-Hop	Gotta Work — Amerie	Rafał "Roofi" Kamiński (season 1)	Safe
Eliza Kindziuk; Łukasz Zięba	Jazz	Sober — Pink	Piotr Jagielski	Safe
Klaudia "Jadźka" Koruba; Maksymilian Hać	Locking	Special Feelings – P.Diddy	Krzysztof Mazur	Bottom 3
Adrianna Piechówka; Rafał Kabungwe	Jive	The Boy Does Nothing — Alesha Dixon	Joanna Szokalska	Safe
Anna Szymoniak; Paweł Kulik	Modern Underground	Call Me When You're Sober – Evanescence	Thierry Verger	Bottom 3

- Bottom 3 Couples solos:

Dancer	Style	Music	Result
Barbara Zielińska	Jazz	I Write Sins Not Tragedies — Panic! at the Disco	Eliminated
Mieszko Wiśniewski	Hip-Hop/Jazz	Love Lockdown — Kanye West	Eliminated
Klaudia "Jadźka" Koruba	Hip-Hop	Gimmie The Light – Sean Paul	Safe
Maksymilian Hać	Popping	Stronger — Kanye West	Safe
Anna Szymoniak	Jazz	Genie 2.0 – Christina Aguilera	Safe
Paweł Kulik	Breakdance	Tainted Love — Marilyn Manson	Safe

- Eliminated:
  - Barbara Zielińska
  - Mieszko Wiśniewski

=== Week 2: Top 14 (22 April 2009) ===
- Group Dance: Sorry (remix) — Madonna (Modern Jazz; Choreographer: Katarzyna Kizior)
- Top 14 Couple dances:

Couple	Style	Music	Choreographer(s)	Results
Kaja Kudełko; Paweł Kulik	Hip-Hop	Dead and Gone – T.I. ft. Justin Timberlake	Fedrerica Neclerio	Safe
Anna Kaperaa; Piotr Jeznach	Salsa	Salsa Y Sabor – Tito Puente	Konrad Dąbski	Safe
Adrianna Piechówka; Jakub Werel	Wacking	XR2 — M.I.A.	Federica Neclerio	Safe
Eliza Kindziuk; Łukasz Ziemba	Modern Jazz	Brazen — Skunk Anansie	Katarzyna Kizor	Safe
Anna Szymonak; Rafał Kabungwe	Pop	Poker Face — Lady Gaga	Maria Foryś (season 1)	Szymoniak Eliminated
Klaudia "Jadżka" Koruba; Jurij Żurajew	Jazz	Gotta Be Somebody – Nickelback	Natalia Madejczyk (season 1)	Żurajew Eliminated
Julia Żytko; Maksymilian Hać	Quickstep	I Don't Feel Like Dancin' – Scissor Sister	Maciej Zakliczyński	Bottom 3

- Bottom 3 Couples solos:

Dancer	Style	Music	Result
Anna Szymoniak	Jazz	Smells Like Teen Spirit — Nirvana	Eliminated
Rafał Kabungwe	Hip-Hop	A Milli – Lil Wayne	Safe
Klaudia "Jadżka" Koruba	Hip-Hop	Bad Man – Missy Elliott	Safe
Jurij Żurajew	Jazz	James Bond Theme – Moby	Eliminated
Julia Żytko	Hip-Hop	I Luv U – Dizzie Rascal	Safe
Maksymilan Hać	Hip-hop	Ultimate Satisfaction — Ludacris	Safe

- Eliminated:
  - Anna Szymoniak
  - Jurij Żurajew

=== Week 3: Top 12 (29 April 2009) ===
- Group Dance: Show Me Love (Safari mix) — Mobin Masters & Robin S & Karina Chavez (Hip-Hop; Choreographer: Gabriel Francisco)
- Top 10 Couple dances:

Couple	Style	Music	Choreographer(s)	Results
Adrianna Piechówka; Maksymilian Hać	Hip-hop (New Style)	Stronger – Kanye West	Gabriel Francisco	Both Eliminated
Eliza Kindziuk; Piotr Jeznach	Cha-Cha-Cha	Get The Party Started – Shirley Bassey	Mariusz Olszewski	Safe
Klaudia "Jadźka" Koruba; Paweł Kulik	Contemporary	Trudno Kochać — Kayah	Mariusz Olszewski	Safe
Anna Kapera; Łukasz Zięba	Rock & Roll	Au szalalala – Shakin'Dudi	Jacek Gumienny	Bottom 3
Kaja Kudełko; Rafał Kabungwe	Jazz	Broken Strings – James Morrison & Nelly Furtado	Paweł Michno	Bottom 3
Julia Żytko; Jakub Werel	Modern Jazz	Breathe Me – Sia	Geneviève Dorion-Coupal	Safe

- Bottom 3 Couples solos:

Dancer	Style	Music	Result
Adrianna Piechówka	Rumba	You Make It Real – James Morrison	Eliminated
Maksymilian Hać	Hip-hop(New Style)	Everyone Nose — N.E.R.D.	Eliminated
Anna Kapera	Contemporary	Better Days — Ayọ	Safe
Łukasz Zięba	Jazz	24 – Jem	Safe
Kaja Kudełko	Hip-hop (New Style)	Yeah Yeah – Bodyrox ft. Luciana	Safe
Rafał Kabungwe	Hip-hop	Kiss Kiss — Chris Brown ft. T-Pain	Safe

- Eliminated:
  - Adrianna Piechówka
  - Maksymilian Hać

=== Week 4: Top 10 (6 May 2009) ===
- Group Dance: Cloud Nine — Evanescence (Contemporary; Choreographer: Mariusz Olszewski)
- Top 10 Couple Dances:

Couple	Style	Music	Choreographer(s)	Results
Kaja Kudełko; Łukasz Zięba	Argentine Tango	Cell Block Tango – Chicago soundtrack	Piotr Wożniak	Kudełko Eliminated
Julia Żytko; Piotr Jeznach	Modern Jazz	Out of my Mind – James Blunt	Katarzyna Kizior	Safe
Eliza Kindziuk; Rafał Kabungwe	Oldschool Hip-hop	Push Up – The Freestylers	Diana Staniszewska (season 1)	Kabungwe Eliminated
Klaudia "Jadźka" Koruba; Jakub Werel	Rumba	Why – Annie Lennox	Mariusz Olszewski	Bottom 3
Anna Kapera; Paweł Kulik	Street Jazz	Pray 4 Love – Afromental & Andy Stwelocks	Natalia Madejczyk (season 1)	Safe

- Bottom 3 Couples solos:

Dancer	Style	Music	Result
Kaja Kudełko	Hip-Hop (New Style)	O Saya – M.I.A.	Eliminated
Łukasz Zięba	Jazz	It's A Man's Man's Man's World — Seal	Safe
Eliza Kindziuk	Jazz	Black Cat – Janet Jackson	Safe
Rafał Kabungwe	Hip-hop	Playing With Fire — Lil Wayne & BettyWight	Eliminated
Klaudia "Jadźka" Koruba	Hip-hop	Wanna Be Startin' Something 2008 – Michael Jackson & Akon	Safe
Jakub Werel	Vouging	Spitfire – The Prodigy	Safe

- Eliminated*:
  - Kaja Kudełko
  - Rafał Kabungwe

=== Week 5: Top 8 (13 May 2009) ===
- Group Dances:

Dancers	Style	Music	Choreographer
Top 8	Hip-hop	Diva — Beyoncé/Go Girl – Pitbull & Trina & Young Boss (Hip-Hop	Rafał "Roofi" Kamiński (season 1)
Top 4 Female Dancers	Contemporary	Storm – Vanessa Mae	Mariusz Olszewski
Top 4 Male Dancers	Contemporary	In The Air Tonight – Nonpoint	Maruisz Olszewski

- Top 8 Couple dances:

Couple	Style	Music	Choreographer(s)	Results
Anna Kapera; Piotr Jeznach	Modern Jazz	Shape of My Heart – Sting	Katarzyna Kizior	Safe
Eliza Kindziuk; Jakub Werel	Mambo	Mambo no. 4 – Afromental & Andy "Stewelcoks" Ninvalle	Monika Grzelak; Przemysław Wereszczyński	Both Eliminated
Klaudia "Jadźka" Koruba; Paweł Kulik	Foxtrot	Down on my Knees – Ayọ	Adam Król	Bottom 3
Julia Żytko; Łukasz Zięba	Hip-hop	Rehab – Rihanna	Rafał "Roofi" Kamiński (season 1)	Bottom 3

- Bottom 3 Couples solos:

Dancer	Style	Music	Result
Eliza Kindziuk	Contemporary	Let It Be — Carol Woods & Timothy Mitchum	Eliminated
Jakub Werel	Dancehall	Straight Up – Sean Paul	Eliminated
Klaudia "Jadźka" Koruba	Hip-hop	Lady Marmalade – Christina Aguilera & Lil' Kim & Pink	Safe
Paweł Kulik	Breakdance	Mary, Mary – Run DMC	Safe
Julia Żytko	Jazz	Childhood Dreams – Nelly Furtado	Safe
Łukasz Zięba	Jazz	Push It Up On Me — Rihanna	Safe

- Eliminated:
  - Eliza Kindziuk
  - Jakub Werel

=== Week 6: Top 6 (20 May 2009) ===
- Group Dance: Let Me Entertain You – Robbie Williams (Jazz; Choreographer: Jonathan Huor)
- Guest Dancers: Swing latino: Quimbara – Celia Cruz & Johnny Pacheco
- Top 6 Couple dances:

Couple	Style	Music	Choreographer(s)	Results
Anna Kapera; Paweł Kulik	Hip-hop	Love Sex Magic – Justin Timberlake ft. Ciara	Caterina Felicioni	Kulik Eliminated
Julia Żytko; Łukasz Zięba	Modern Jazz	Fragile – Delta Goodrem	Joanathan Huor	Safe
Klaudia "Jadźka" Koruba; Piotr Jeznach	Locking	Get Up Offa That Thing — James Brown	Wojciech Blaszko	Koruba Eliminated
Julia Żytko; Paweł Kulik	Paso Doble	Dirty Diana — Piotr Cugowski	Joanna Szokalsak	Kulik Eliminated
Anna Kapera; Piotr Jeznach	Viennese Waltz	Lost – Anouk	Maciej Zakliczyński	Safe
Klaudia "Jadźka" Koruba; Łukasz Zięba	Contemporary	Hometown Glory – Adele	Caterina Felicioni	Koruba Eliminated

- Top 6's solos:

Dancer	Style	Music	Result
Julia Żytko	Hip-hop	Nasty Girl – Destiny's Child	Safe
Paweł Kulik	Breakdance	Hip Hop Is Dead — Nas	Eliminated
Anna Kapera	Ballet	Love You Crazay – En Vogue	Safe
Piotr Jeznach	Hip-hop	Circus — Britney Spears	Safe
Klaudia "Jadźka" Koruba	Dance hall	Breakout – Sean Paul	Eliminated
Łukasz Zięba	Contemporary	I Don't Wanna Miss a Thing – Aerosmith	Safe

- Eliminated:
  - Klaudia "Jadżka" Koruba
  - Paweł Kulik

=== Week 7: Semi-finale – Top 4 (27 May 2009) ===
- Group Dance: Right Round – Flo Rida ft. Kesha (Hip-Hop; Choreographer: Joao Assuncao)
- Guest Dancers: SPOKO – Fix Up – Dizzie Rascal/Bass Phenomeon – Krafty Kutz/It's Me Bitches – Swizz Beats
- Top 4 Couple dances:

Couple	Style	Music	Choreographer(s)	Results
Julia Żytko; Piotr Jeznach	Hip-hop	Get It – T.I.	Joao Assuncao	Both Eliminated
Anna Kapera; Łukasz Zięba	Jazz	Listen – Beyoncé	Paweł Michno	Safe
Julia Żytko; Anna Kapera	Pop-Jazz	Naughty Girl – Beyoncé; Heartburn — Alicia Keys	Maria Foryś (season 1); Izabela Orzełowska (season 3)	Żytko Eliminated
Piotr Jeznach; Łukasz Zięba	Capoeira	Tetsujin — Juno Reactor & Don Davis	Dominika Rembelska; Natalia Madejczyk (season 1)	Jeznach Eliminated

- Top 4's solos:

Dancer	Style	Music	Result
Julia Żytko	Hip-hop	Can I Have Like That – Pharrell Williams/Secret Place – Danity Kane	Eliminated
Piotr Jeznach	Jazz	Slow Dance in a Burning Room – John Mayer	Eliminated
Anna Kapera	Contemporary	Earth Intruders – Björk	Safe
Łukasz Zięba	Jazz	Wordplay – Jason Mraz	Safe

- Eliminated:
  - Julia Żytko
  - Piotr Jeznach

=== Week 8: Finale – Top 2 (3 June 2009) ===
- Group dances:

Dancers	Style	Music	Choreographer
Top 16	Vogue/House	Vogue — Madonna/Like This, Like That – Se Sa	Filip Czeszyk
Top 16 (Without Top 2)	Jazz	Beautiful Day – U2	Geneviève Dorion-Coupal

- Guest Dancers:
  - Wioletta Fiuk & Marcin Mroziński (Both season 3): Homeless – Leona Lewis
  - Fair Play Crew (Rafał "Roofi" Kamiński, Piotr Gałczyk, Błażej Górski, Gabriel Piotrowski, Karol Niecikowski, Piotr Jeznach, Piotr Abramowicz: Latin Thugs – Cypress Hill/U Can't Tell Me Nuffin – Dizzie Rascal/Waiting on the World to Change – John Mayer/Za Dużo Chcesz – ABC/Pushin' – Frank Stallone & Ray Pizzi & Jerry Hey
- Top 2 Couple dances:

Couple	Style	Music	Choreographer(s)
Anna Kapera; Łukasz Zięba	Hip-hop	Shawty Get Loose – Lil Mama	Krzysztof Mazur
Anna Kapera; Łukasz Zięba	Jazz	9 Crimes — Damien Rice & Lisa Hannigan	Geneviève Dorion-Coupal

- Top 2 solos:

Dancer	Style	Music	Result
Anna Kapera	Can-Can	I Can Can You – Vanessa Mae	Winner
Łukasz Zięba	Contemporary	Dziwny Jest Ten Świat – Czesław Niemen	Runner-up

- Results:
  - Winner: Anna Kapera
  - Runner-up: Łukasz Zięba

== First for any So You Think You Can Dance series ==
- On top 14 show there was first ever Wacking routine, it was danced by Adrianna Piechówka and Jakub Werel.

== First for You Can Dance – Po Prostu Tańcz! ==
- First ever Wacking. Top 14 Adrianna Piechówka & Jakub Werel.
- In finale there were two dancers. In semi-finale there were two dancers eliminated as at every other stage of the competition.

== Rating Figures ==
Episode	Date	Official rating 4+	Share 4+	Share 16–39
Auditions 1	4 March 2009	3,145,066	23.41%	26.29%
Auditions 2	11 March 2009	3,451,307	25.42%	28.23%
Auditions 3	18 March 2009	3,273,440	23.90%	25.45%
Lisbon Week 1	25 March 2009	2,916,761	21.92%	24.63%
Lisbon Week 2	1 April 2009	2,378,640	16.36%	17.70%
Live Show Top 16	8 April 2009	2,523,118	21.64%	22.30%
Live Show Top 14	22 April 2009	2,318,115	20.34%	22.35%
Live Show Top 12	29 April 2009	2,404,531	19.92%	22.08%
Live Show Top 10	6 May 2009	2,195,119	17.53%	18.76%
Live Show Top 8	13 May 2009	2,101,043	17.27%	17.64%
Live Show Top 6	20 May 2009	2,195,767	17.94%	17.82%
Live Show Top 4	27 May 2009	2,151,985	16.16%	16.70%
The Final 3	3 June 2009	2,628,383	17.99%	19.63%
Average	2009	2,510,193	19.59%	21.02%
