= I See You (Jutty Ranx song) =

Single by Jutty Ranx

from the album Jutty Ranx
- Released: November 2, 2012
- Genre: Synthpop; electronic
- Length: 3:39; 4:29 (Extended edit)
- Label: Spinnin' Records
- Songwriter(s): Justin Taylor; Jaakko Manninen; Ryan Malina
- Producer(s): Jutty Ranx

Jutty Ranx singles chronology
"I See You" (2012)	"Hello" (2013)

"I See You" is a song written by Californian electronic band Jutty Ranx and released in 2012 as the lead single from their debut studio album Jutty Ranx (2013). The song peaked at number 3 in the Italian chart in 2013. A music video for the song was released on YouTube on 2 November 2012 by Spinnin' Records.

== Music video ==
The official music video was released on the Spinnin' Records YouTube channel on 2 November 2012. It lasts for three minutes and forty-three seconds. The video was filmed in stop motion and shows Jutty Ranx singer Justin Taylor singing the song while post-it and other objects move around him.

== Charts ==
=== Weekly charts ===
Weekly chart performance for "I See You"
Chart (2013–2014)	Peak position
Belgium (Ultratip Bubbling Under Flanders)	47
Czech Republic (Rádio – Top 100)	37
France (SNEP)	55
Italy (FIMI)	3
Russia Airplay (TopHit) Slider & Magnit Remix	63
Switzerland (Schweizer Hitparade)	73
Ukraine Airplay (TopHit) Slider & Magnit Remix	69

=== Year-end charts ===
Year-end chart performance for "I See You"
Chart (2013)	Position
Italy (FIMI)	15
Russia Airplay (TopHit)	162

== Certifications and sales ==
Certifications for "I See You"
Region	Certification	Certified units/sales
Italy (FIMI)	2× Platinum	60,000^{‡}
^{‡} Sales+streaming figures based on certification alone.
