= Jutty Ranx =

American electronic dance music band

- Origin: Los Angeles, California, U.S.
- Genres: Electronic; EDM
- Years active: 2012–present
- Label: Independent
- Members: Jaakko Manninen; Justin Taylor; Ryan Malina
- Website: juttyranx.com

Jutty Ranx is an American electronic dance music band, consisting of vocalist Justin Taylor, DJ Jaakko Manninen (associated with the Finnish act Beats and Styles), and Ryan Malina. Their debut single "I See You" charted in the official Italian digital downloads, certified by FIMI, for 13 weeks, peaking at number 3 in March 2013; it was also certified 2× Platinum for selling more than 60,000 copies.

Jutty Ranx released their self-titled debut album in Italy on May 21, 2013, with summer release globally. Their second album, Discordia, was released on June 23, 2015.

== Discography ==
=== Studio albums ===
- Jutty Ranx (2013)
- Discordia (2015)

=== Singles ===
Year	Title	Peak chart positions					Certifications	Album
Year	Title	BEL (Vl)	CZE	FRA	ITA	SUI	Certifications	Album
2012	"I See You"	97	37	55	3	73	ITA: 2× Platinum	Jutty Ranx
