= Patricia Kazadi =

Polish actress, singer, and dancer

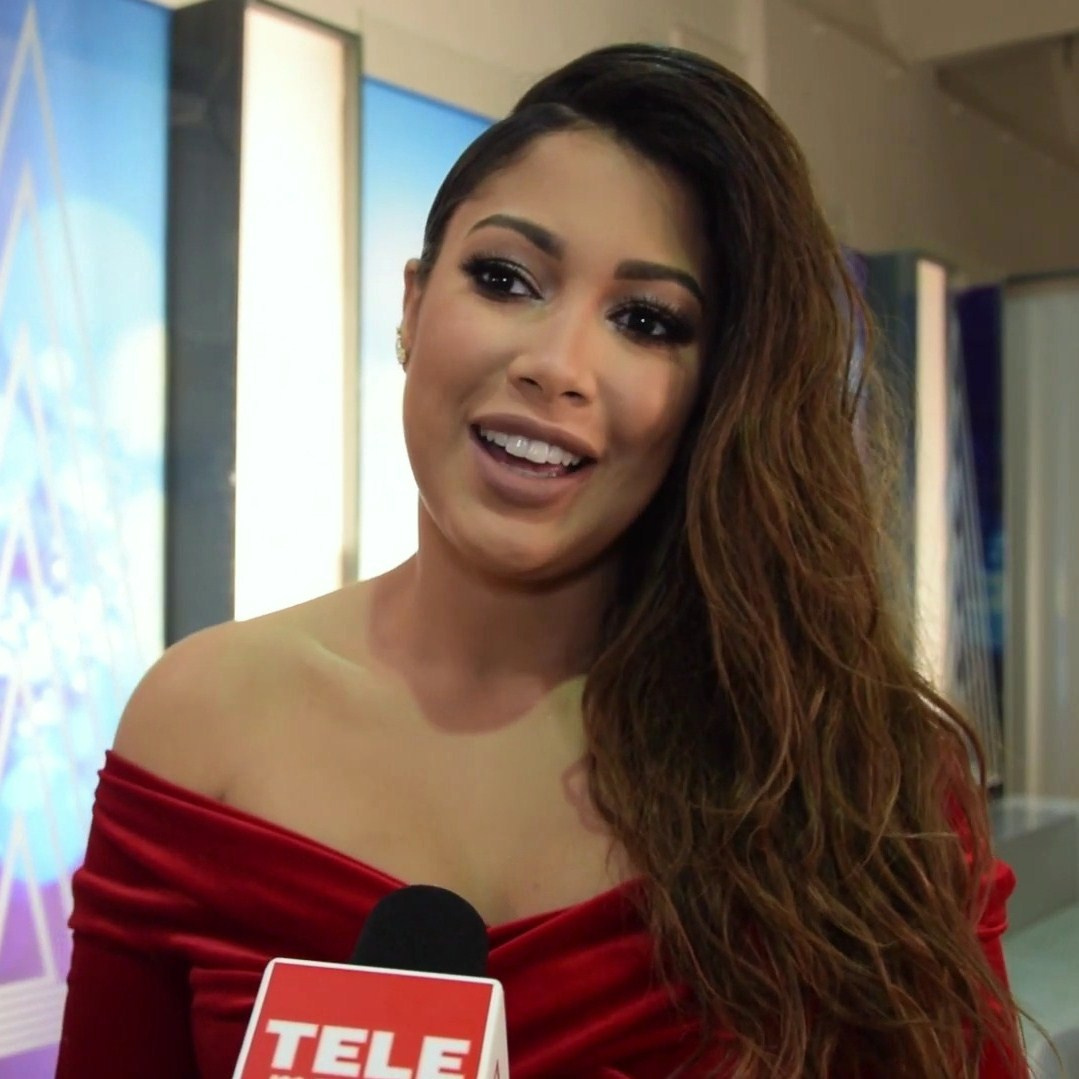
- Kazadi in 2018
- Born: 17 March 1988 (age 38); Warsaw, Poland
- Occupations: Actress, Singer, Dancer
- Musical career
- Genres: pop R&B
- Label: EMI Music Poland
- Website: www.patriciakazadi.com

Patricia "Trish" Tshilanda Kazadi (born 17 March 1988 in Warsaw) is a Polish actress, singer, dancer, and television personality.

== Parents ==
Kazadi's mother is from Łuków in Lublin Voivodeship, while her father is from the Democratic Republic of the Congo.

== Education ==
Kazadi was accepted into the Warsaw University of Technology, where she studied Administration full-time. Unable to complete all the required subjects, she opted for part-time studies at the Warsaw School of Economics. She plays the piano and composes music, and trained in modern dance for two years. She was involved in music, theater, and media from a young age. Kazadi was also a student of the Krzysztof Komeda Second Level School of Popular and Jazz Music in Warsaw.

== Television ==
- She was nurse Jagna Nowak on the TV series Ranczo
- She hosted Everyday English on TVN Lingua; the channel became defunct in 2009.
- From 5 September to 14 November 2010, Kazadi was on Season 12 of Taniec z gwiazdami, the Polish version of Dancing with the Stars. She danced with Łukasz Czarnecki and placed fourth.
- In 2007, she placed third in the second edition of Jak oni śpiewają (How They Sing, the Polish version of Soapstar Superstar). She made guest appearances in later editions, singing with Żora Koroliow (fourth edition) and Maciej Jachowski (fifth edition). On 22 December 2007 Kazadi sang on the holiday edition of the show, titled Jak oni śpiewają? – Jak oni świętują? (singing with Małgorzata Lewińska and Dominika Figurska), and on 30 May 2009 in a special broadcast titled Jak oni śpiewają – Dzień Dziecka (with Karolina Nowakowska, Aleksandra Szwed, and Monika Mrozowska), winning the Polsat Foundation Heart Statuette. In 2009, she participated in the sixth edition and placed fifth among eleven contestants.
- Kazadi took part in the Great Orchestra of Christmas Charity final in 2011, offering dinner with her and the opportunity to learn the behind the scene secrets of working at TVN Warsaw.
- In 2011 Kazadi replaced Kinga Rusin as the host of You Can Dance: Po prostu tańcz! (the Polish version of So You Think Can Dance).
- Since 2013 Kazadi has been the host of the Polish version of X Factor.
- In 2016 Kazadi got the role as Reri in the Polish biographical series Bodo, which tells the story of the actor and singer Eugene Bodo who died in the Russian Gulag in 1943.
- In 2025, Kazadi became the first Polish actress in Bridgerton, being cast for its fourth season.

== Music ==
Kazadi has made guest appearances on albums by Ten Typ Mes, Flexxip, Tewu, 2 Cztery 7, Gorzki and O$ka. In July 2010 she recorded and launched two single with DJ Krist Van D – "On Tonite" and “Be Without You".

== Commercials ==
She has appeared in commercials for mobile phone company Play and Axe Villa.

== Filmography ==
Title	Year	Role	Notes
Jak się pozbyć cellulitu	2011	Hanna Rubin (journalist)	
Ranczo (TV series)	2011-	Jagna Nowak (nurse)	
Licencja na wychowanie	2010	Jadzia Leszczyńska (Pawel's cousin)	
Święty interes	2010	Motema (Leszek's wife)	
Na Wspólnej	2009-2010	Beata Dolniak (Marta and Filip's neighbour)	
Balladyna	2009	journalist	
Rajskie klimaty	2009	Helena Wójcik (Andrzej's wife)	
Miłość na wybiegu	2009	modeling agency receptionist	
Funio, Szefunio i reszta... czyli dzieciaki ratują świat	2009	Józefin's mother	
Londyńczycy	2008-2009	Helen Hobbs (nurse)	
Fala zbrodni	2007-2008	Milena Bauman	
Egzamin z życia	2005-2008	Anna Chełmicka (Andrzej's sister)	
Daleko od noszy	2004	mother of a kidnapped child	

== Polish dubbing ==
Title	Year	Role	Notes
Gwiezdne wojny: Wojny klonów	2009	Suu	
The Powerpuff Girls (2016)	2017	Bliss (in the "Power of Four" special)	

== Discography ==
=== Albums ===
Trip (2013)

=== Singles ===
- 2008 - "Scream For Love"
- 2010 - "On Tonite" (DJ Krist Van D featuring Patricia Kazadi)
- 2010 - "Be Without You" (DJ Krist Van D featuring Patricia Kazadi)
- 2011 - "Hałas"
- 2011 - "Go Crazy"
- 2012 - "Wanna Feel You Now" (with M. Pokora)
- 2013 - "Przerywam sen"

=== Guest appearances ===
Year	Artist/Album	Song	Source
2009	Ten Typ Mes - Zamach na przeciętność	"Alkopoligamia [2006 R.] (Bonus Track)" (feat. Trish)	
2008	TeWu - Ślad po sobie	"Nie Śpij" (feat. Trish)	
2008	Gorzki - Kontrawersja	"Bounce" (feat. Damian (II), Trish)	
2008	2cztery7 - Spaleni innym słońcem	"Owinąłem Sobie Tą Grę..." (feat. Trish); "Upewnij Się" (feat. Trish); "Z Dostawą Do Domu" (feat. Piotr Pacak, Trish)	
2005	2cztery7 - Funk - dla smaku	"Dwa, Cztery, Siedem" (feat. Trish)	
2005	Slums Attack - Najlepszą obroną jest atak	"K.O. CHAM" (feat. St0ne, Trish)	
2004	O$ka - Przez $ Jak...	"Tak Zapomnieć" (feat. Ten Typ Mes, Trish)	
