= You Can Dance – Po Prostu Tańcz! season 1 =

You Can Dance – Po Prostu Tańcz!
- Season 1
- Hosted by: Kinga Rusin
- Judges: Agustin Egurrola; Michał Piróg; Weronika Marczuk-Pazura
- Winner: Maciej Florek
- Runner-up: Rafał Kamiński

Release
- Original network: TVN
- Original release: September 5 – December 2, 2007

Season chronology
- Next → Season 2

The first season of You Can Dance – Po prostu Tańcz. The dancers compete to win PLN 100,000 and a 3-month scholarship in dance school Broadway Dance Center, but first they have to go through auditions. Later, 50 contestants do the workshops abroad – this season in Paris, France. This seasons on choreography camp special guest choreographer was Wade Robson. From sixteen people, two dancers are eliminated in each episode (In the semi-final episode there was one contestant eliminated), to the final episode that features the top three contestants. The show is hosted by Kinga Rusin. The judges are Agustin Egurrola, Michał Piróg and Weronika Marczuk-Pazura. It premiered on 5 September 2007. Maciej Florek was announced as the winner on 2 December 2007.

== Auditions ==
Season Background Song: Right Here, Right Now – Fatboy Slim
Open auditions for this season were held in the following locations:

- Bytom, 27 July 2007
- Wrocław, 29 July 2007
- Poznań, 31 July 2007
- Gdańsk, 3 August 2007
- Warsaw 5 August 2007

The song during Sneek Peeks at the end of the episode is Just Lose It – Eminem

=== Top 50 dancers ===
During the auditions judges picked 50 dancers. These dancers were taking part in choreography camp in Paris, France.

City	Dancer	Age	Style	Number of dancers	Number of top 14 dancers
Bytom	Katarzyna Waligóra	25	Hip-Hop	7	1
Bytom	Michalina Rudek^{2}	18	Hip-Hop	7	1
Bytom	Artur Frontczak	17	Jazz	7	1
Wrocław	Rafał Kryla	28	Breakdance/Hip-Hop	7	4
Wrocław	Weronika Mleczko	19	Hip-Hop	7	4
Wrocław	Łukasz Skowron^{2}	26	Breakdance	7	4
Wrocław	Magdalena Góra^{2}	21	Hip-Hop	7	4
Wrocław	Mariusz Jasuwienas^{2}	24	Hip-Hop/Krump	7	4
Wrocław	Zbigniew Karbowski^{2}	25	Breakdance/Hip-Hop	7	4
Poznań	Barbara Derkowska	23	Hip-Hop	8	2
Poznań	Agata Bogońska^{2}	21	Hip-Hop/Ballet	8	2
Poznań	Diana Staniszewska	18	Popping	8	2
Poznań	Marcin Konopacki^{2}	22	Hip-Hop	8	2
Poznań	Victoria Okonkwo^{2}	17		8	2
Gdańsk	Maciej Florek	26	Contemporary	8	4
Gdańsk	Rafał "Roofi" Kamiński^{2}	26	Hip-Hop	8	4
Gdańsk	Karol Niecikowski^{2}	23	Hip-Hop	8	4
Gdańsk	Anna Bosak^{2}	19	Ballroom	8	4
Gdańsk	Maria Foryś	24	Afro Jazz/Dancehall	8	4
Gdańsk	Rafał Kabungwe	17	Hip-Hop/Ballroom	8	4
Warsaw	Patryk Gacki	21	Abstract style	20	5
Warsaw	Natalia Madejczyk	22	Contemporary/Jazz/Hip-Hop	20	5
Warsaw	Damian Czeszewski	21	Ballroom	20	5
Warsaw	Magdalena Choroszy	21	Ballroom	20	5
Warsaw	Ida Nowakowska	16	Ballet	20	5
Warsaw	Piotr Gałczyk	19	Hip-Hop	20	5
Warsaw	Patryk Rybarski	23	Jazz	20	5
Warsaw	Anna Szymoniak	22	Jazz	20	5
Warsaw	Wioletta Fiuk	21	Contemporary	20	5
Warsaw	Błażej Ciszek	24	Ballet	20	5
Warsaw	Anna Andrzejewska	23	Contemporary/Ballet	20	5
Warsaw	Jakub Jóżwiak	20	Contemporary/Jazz	20	5
Warsaw	Jacek Suchecki	20	Hip-Hop	20	5
Warsaw	Katarzyna Wis	21		20	5
Warsaw	Zyta Bujasz	23	Contemporary	20	5
Warsaw	Anna Matysiak	18	Jazz	20	5

^1These dancers were shown only in youcandance.tvn.pl website extras.

^2These dancers earned the tickets after choreography round.

== Choreography Camp (Paris) week ==
Judges: Agustin Egurrola, Weronika Marczuk-Pazura, Michał Piróg

Task/style	Music	Choreographer(s)
Hip-Hop	Fantasy – Timbaland feat. Money	Anthony Kaye
Salsa	La Malanga — Eddie Palmieri	Cris de la Pena
Pop	Ice Box – Omarion	Krzysztof "Soda" Rudziński
Jazz	Petite Soeur – Lââm	Piotr Jagielski
Modern Jazz	Unknown	Nadia Ira Kodiche
All (in groups)	Umbrella – Rihanna	The Group
Final Choreography (Pop-Jazz)	Cabaret Hoover from The Triplets of Belleville (Les Triplettes de Belleville)	Wade Robson

== Top 16 Contestants ==
=== Women ===
Contestant	Age	Home Town	Dance Specialty	Elimination date
Anna Bosak	19	Łódź	Ballroom	2 December 2007
Diana Staniszewska	18	Koszalin	Popping	21 November 2007
Natalia Madejczyk	22	Łódź	Contemporary/Jazz	14 November 2007
Maria Foryś	24	Gdańsk	Afro Jazz/Dancehall	7 November 2007
Ida Nowakowska	16	Warsaw	Ballet	31 October 2007
Agata Bogońska	21	Krzepielów	Hip-Hop/Ballet	24 October 2007
Magdalena Góra	21	Kraków	Hip-Hop	17 October 2007
Magdalena Choroszy	21	Wrocław	Ballroom	10 October 2007

=== Men ===
Finalist	Age	Home Town	Dance Specialty	Elimination date
Maciej "Gleba" Florek	26	Gdańsk	Contemporary	Winner
Rafał "Roofi" Kamiński	26	Grajewo	Hip-Hop	Runner-up
Rafał "Tito" Kryla	28	Mysłowice	Breakdance/Hip-Hop	14 November 2007
Piotr Gałczyk	19	Białystok	Hip-Hop	7 November 2007
Błażej Ciszek	24	Warsaw	Ballet	31 October 2007
Mariusz Jasuwienas	24	Kraków	Hip-Hop/Krump	24 October 2007
Zbigniew Karbowski	25	Wrocław	Breakdance/Hip-Hop	17 October 2007
Artur Frontczak	17	Łódź	Jazz	10 October 2007

== Elimination chart ==
Key:
Female	Male	Bottom 3 Couples	Eliminated	Did not perform due to injury	Immunity and Winner	Runner-up

			10/17	10/24	10/31	11/7	11/14	11/21	12/2
	Contestant	Result							
Final Top 3	Maciej "Gleba Florek			Btm 3		Btm 3			WINNER
Final Top 3	Rafał "Roofi" Kamiński	Btm 3	Btm 3		Btm 3				Runner-up
Final Top 3	Anna Bosak	Btm 3	Btm 3						Elim
Top 4	Diana Staniszewska			Btm 3	Btm 3	Btm 3		Elim	
Top 6	Rafał "Tito" Kryla			Injury	Btm 3	Btm 3	Elim		
Top 6	Natalia Madejczyk					Btm 3	Elim		
Top 8	Piotr Gałczyk			Btm 3	Btm 3	Elim			
Top 8	Maria Foryś			Btm 3	Btm 3	Elim			
Top 10	Błażej Ciszek				Elim				
Top 10	Ida Nowakowska				Elim				
Top 12	Mariusz Jasuwienas	Btm 3	Btm 3	Elim					
Top 12	Agata Bogońska	Btm 3	Btm 3	Elim					
Top 14	Zbigniew Karbowski		Elim						
Top 14	Magdalena Góra		Elim						
Top 16	Artur Frontczak	Elim							
Top 16	Magdalena Choroszy	Elim							

== Performance nights ==
=== Week 1: Top 16 ===
- Group Dance: The Way I Are — Timbaland ft. D.O.E. (Hip-Hop; Choreographer: Anthony Kaye)
- Guest Dancers:
  - Kamil Kucharzewski – 12-year-old boy, who auditioned in Wrocław – (Electric Boogie) – Born 2 Dance – Sonic Division
- Top 16 Couple dances:

Couple	Style	Music	Choreographer(s)	Result
Rafał "Tito"" Kryla; Ida Nowakowska	Hip-Hop	Love Stoned – Justin Timberlake	Anna Jujka	Safe
Natalia Madejczyk; Błażej Ciszek	Jazz	Say It Right – Nelly Furtado	Piotr Jagielski	Safe
Magdalena Choroszy; Artur Frontczak	Viedoclip Dance (Pop)	Me & U — Cassie	Krzysztof "Soda" Rudziński	Both Eliminated
Agata Bogońska; Mariusz Jasuwienas	Contemporary	Świat się pomylił — Patrycja Markowska	Andzej Morawiec	Bottom 3
Anna Bosak; Rafał "Roofi" Kamiński	Waltz	Beautiful — Christina Aguilera	Krzysztof Król	Bottom 3
Magdalena Góra; Zbigniew Karbowski	Broadway	All That Jazz from Chicago	Grzegorz Pańtak	Safe
Diana Staniszewska; Maciej "Gleba" Florek	Jive	Girlfriend – Avril Lavigne	Joanna Szokalska	Safe
Maria Foryś; Piotr Gałczyk	Hip-Hop (Dancehall)	Rock This Party (Everybody Dance Now) – Bob Sinclar	Kelechi Onyele	Safe

- Bottom 3 Couples solos:

Dancer	Style	Music	Result
Magdalena Choroszy	Cha-Cha	I Like It Like That – Tito Nieves	Eliminated
Artur Frontczak	Jazz	You Give Me Something – James Morrison	Eliminated
Agata Bogońska	Hip-Hop	All Nite (Don't Stop) – Janet Jackson	Safe
Mariusz Jasuwienas	Hip-Hop	Concentrate – Xzibit	Safe
Anna Bosak	Samba	Si Yo Llego, Yo Llego – Sergent Garcia	Safe
Rafał "Roofi" Kamiński	Hip-Hop	Should I Go – Brandy	Safe

- Eliminated:
  - Magdalena Choroszy
  - Artur Frontczak

=== Week 2: Top 14 ===
- Group Dance: Hey Boy, Hey Girl — Chemical Brothers (House/Stepping; Choreographer: Filip Czeszyk)
- Top 14 Couple dances:

Couple	Style	Music	Choreographer(s)	Result
Maria Foryś; Piotr Gałczyk	Jazz	Apologize – Timbaland	Piotr Jagielski	Safe
Magdalena Góra; Zbigniew Karbowski	Contemporary	You're Beautiful – James Blunt	Elżbieta and Grzegorz Pańtak	Both Eliminated
Diana Staniszewska; Maciej "Gleba" Florek	Mambo	Mambo de la Luz – Orq de la Luz	Chris de la Pena	Safe
Agata Bogońska; Mariusz Jasuwienas	Hip-Hop	What Goes Around — Justin Timberlake	Anna Jujka	Bottom 3
Rafał "Tito" Kryla; Ida Nowakowska	Tango	Objection (Tango) – Shakira	Adam Król	Safe
Anna Bosak; Rafał "Roofi" Kamiński	Disco	Sorry — Madonna	Iwona Orzełowska	Bottom 3
Natalia Madejczyk; Błażej Ciszek	Cha-Cha	Shut Up and Drive – Rihanna	Joanna Szokalska	Safe

- Bottom 3 Couples solos:

Dancer	Style	Music	Result
Magdalena Góra	Hip-Hop	Ready – Black Bob	Eliminated
Zbigniew Karbowski	Hip-Hop	Do You – Ne-Yo	Eliminated
Agata Bogońska	Hip-Hop	Love Stoned – Justin Timberlake	Safe
Mariusz Jasuwienas	Hip-Hop	James Bond Theme – Moby	Safe
Anna Bosak	Paso Doble		Safe
Rafał "Roofi" Kamiński	Hip-Hop	You'll Find A Way – Santigold	Safe

- Eliminated:
  - Magdalena Góra
  - Zbigniew Karbowski

=== Week 3: Top 12 (24 October 2007) ===
- Group Performance: Bring Me to Life — Evanescence
- Top 12 Couple dances:

Couple	Style	Music	Choreographer(s)	Results
Agato Bogońska; Mariusz Jasuwienas	Broadway	Cadillac Car – Dream Girls soundtrack	Jacek Wazelin	Both Eliminated
Natalia Madejczyk; Błażej Ciszek	Samba	Hey Mama – The Black Eyed Peas	Joanna Szokalska	Safe
Ida Nowakowska; Piotr Jagielski*	Jazz	The Sweet Escape — Gwen Stefani	Piotr Jagielski	Safe
Diana Staniszewska; Maciej "Gleba" Florek	Contemporary	My Immortal — Evanescence	Andrzej Morawiec	Bottom 3
Anna Bosak; Rafał "Roofi" Kamiński	Hip-hop	Pass That Dutch — Missy Elliott	Anna Jujka	Safe
Maria Foryś; Piotr Gałczyk	Videoclip Dance (Pop)	Crazy in Love – Beyoncé	Krzysztof "Soda" Rudziński	Bottom 3

- Bottom 3 Couples solos:

Dancer	Style	Music	Result
Agata Bogońska	Ballet	Imma Shine — YoungBloodz	Eliminated
Mariusz Jasuwienas	Hip-Hop (Krump)	Spaz Meter – J-Sqad	Eliminated
Diana Staniszewska	Popping	Rhythm Nation – Janet Jackson	Safe
Maciej "Gleba" Florek	Contemporary	In Dust — Chemical Brothers	Safe
Maria Foryś	Afro Jazz		Safe
Piotr Gałczyk	Hip-hop	Inspiration – Sistars	Safe

- Eliminated:
  - Magdalena Góra
  - Zbigniew Karbowski
- New partners:
  - None. Now that only the top ten remain, new partners are randomly assigned each week
- Rafał "Tito" Kryla did not perform due to injury, in next episode he has to perform his solo in bottom. He was substituted by choreographer – Piotr Jagielski

=== Week 4: Top 10 (31 October 2007) ===
- Group Performance: Numb/Encore — Linkin Park & Jay-Z
- Top 10 Couple dances:

Couple	Style	Music	Choreographer(s)	Results
Natalia Madejczyk; Rafał "Tito" Kryla	Jazz	Ain't No Other Man – Christina Aguilera	Katarzyna Kizor	Madejczyk Safe; Kryla in Bottom 3
Diana Staniszewska; Rafał "Roofi" Kamiński	Hip-hop	My Love – Justin Timberlake	Justyna Lichacy	Bottom 3
Anna Bosak; Maciej "Gleba" Florek	Contemporary	Because of You — Kelly Clarkson	Nadia Ira Kodiche	Safe
Maria Forys; Piotr Gałczyk	Hip-Hop (Dance hall)	Give It to You — Eve feat. Sean Paul	Justyna Lichacy	Bottom 3
Ida Nowakowska; Błażej Ciszek	Paso Doble	Teenagers – My Chemical Romance	Joanna Szokalska	Both Eliminated

- Bottom 3 Couples solos:

Dancer	Style	Music	Result
Diana Staniszewska	Popping	Pleasure Principal – Janet Jackson	Safe
Rafał "Roofi" Kamiński	Hip-hop	The Time is Now – Moloko	Safe
Maria Foryś	Afro Jazz	Bad Man – Missy Elliott	Safe
Piotr Gałczyk	Hip-hop	Last Night — P.Diddy feat. Keyshia Cole	Safe
Ida Nowakowska	Jazz	Unknown	Eliminated
Błażej Ciszek	Salsa/Jazz	Outro Lugar — Salomé de Bahia	Eliminated
Rafał "Kryla" Tito	Hip-hop	Clothes Off — Gym Class Heroes	Safe

- Eliminated:
  - Ida Nowakowska
  - Błażej Ciszek

=== Week 5: Top 8 (7 November 2007) ===
- Group Performance: Please Don't Stop The Music — Rihanna
- Top 8 Couple dances:

Couple	Style	Music	Choreographer(s)	Results
Maria Foryś; Rafał "Tito" Kryla	Hip-hop	Gimmie More – Britney Spears	Anthony Kaye	Foryś Eliminated; Kryla in Bottom 3
Diana Staniszewska; Piotr Gałczyk	Locking	Get Up (I Feel Like Being a) Sex Machine – James Brown	Krzysztof Mazur	Staniszwska in Bottom 3 Gałczyk Eliminated
Natalia Madejczyk; Maciej "Gleba" Florek	Salsa	Si, Si, No, No – Machito; Pa'lante – Tito Puente	Chris de la Pena	Bottom 3
Anna Bosak; Rafał "Roofi" Kamiński	Jazz	Jest już Ciemno – Feel	Piotr Jagielski	Safe

- Bottom 3 Couples solos:

Dancer	Style	Music	Result
Maria Foryś	Jazz	Teardrop – Massive Attack	Eliminated
Rafał "Tito" Kryla	Hip-hop	My Love — Justin Timberlake	Safe
Diana Staniszewska	Popping	Beat It – Michael Jackson	Safe
Piotr Gałczyk	Hip-hop	Slow — Sammie	Eliminated
Natalia Madejczyk	Hip hop	Ice Box – Omarion	Eliminated
Maciej "Gleba" Florek	Contemporary		Safe

- Eliminated*:
  - Maria Foryś
  - Piotr Gałczyk

=== Week 6: Top 6 (14 November 2007) ===
Group Performance: Fever — Michael Bublé

- Couple dances:

Couple	Style	Music	Choreographer(s)	Result
Natalia Madejczyk; Rafał "Roofi" Kamiński	Pop	S.O.S – Katarzyna Cerekwicka	Anna Jujka	Madejczyk Eliminated
Natalia Madejczyk; Rafał "Roofi" Kamiński	Argentine Tango	Santa Maria — Gotan Project	Piotr Wożniak	Madejczyk Eliminated
Diana Staniszewska; Rafał "Tito" Kryla	Hip-hop	Get It Poppin – Fat Joe feat. Nelly	Mariusz Mikołajekt	Kryla Eliminated
Diana Staniszewska; Rafał "Tito" Kryla	Bellydance	Whenever, Wherever — Shakira	Jasmine Mazloum	Kryla Eliminated
Anna Bosak; Maciej "Gleba" Florek	Jive	Candyman – Christina Aguilera	Joanna Szokalska	Safe
Anna Bosak; Maciej "Gleba" Florek	Jazz	When You're Gone — Avril Lavigne	Piotr Jagielski	Safe

- Top 6's solos:

Dancer	Style	Music	Result
Natalia Madejczyk	Jazz	The Right Man – Christina Aguilera	Eliminated
Rafał "Roofi" Kamiński	Hip-hop	I've Got What You Need — Afromental	Safe
Diana Staniszewska	Popping	Fantastic Voyage — Lakeside	Safe
Rafał "Tito" Kryla	Breakdance	Don't Stop Til You Get Enough — Michael Jackson	Eliminated
Anna Bosak	Ballroom	Fergalicious — Fergie	Safe
Maciej "Gleba" Florek	Contemporary	Shape of My Heart – Sting	Safe

- Eliminated:
  - Natalia Madejczyk
  - Rafał "Kryla" Tito

=== Week 7: Semi-finale – Top 4 (21 November 2007) ===
Group Performance: Fame – Irena Care/Wait a Minute – Pussycat Dolls & Timbaland

- Couple dances:

Couple	Style	Music	Choreographer(s)	Results
Diana Staniszewska; Maciej "Gleba" Florek	Rumba	I Wanna Love You – Akon & Snoop Dogg	Joanna Szokalska	Staniszewska Eliminated
Anna Bosak; Rafał "Roofi" Kamiński	Jazz	Here with Me – Dido	Katarzyna Kizior	Safe
Anna Bosak; Diana Staniszewska	Broadway	Sparkling Diamonds — Moulin Rouge! soundtrack	Jacek Wazelin	Staniszewska Eliminated
Rafał "Roofi" Kamiński; Maciej "Gleba" Florek	House	Let's Dance — Hi Tack	Filip Czeszyk	Safe

- Top 4's solos:

Dancer	Style	Music	Result
Diana Staniszewska	Moonwalk	Billie Jean – Michael Jackson	Eliminated
Maciej "Gleba" Florek	Contemporary	Good Luck — Basement Jaxx	Safe
Anna Bosak	Ballroom	El Tango de Roxxanne – Moulin Rouge! soundtrack	Safe
Rafał Kamiński	Hip-hop	Not The Only One — Amerie	Safe

- Eliminated:
  - Diana Staniszewska

=== Week 8: Finale – Top 3 (2 December 2007) ===
Group Performance: Top 16: (I've Had) The Time of My Life – Dirty Dancing soundtrack

Couple	Style	Music	Choreographer(s)
Rafał "Roofi" Kamińskia; Maciej "Gleba" Florek	Hip-hop	SexyBack – Justin Timberlake	Justyna Lichacy
Anna Bosak; Maciej "Gleba" Florek	Jazz	Taking Chances—Celine Dion	Piotr Jagielski
Anna Bosak; Rafał "Roofi" Kamiński	Modern	Nothing Compares 2 U — Sinéad O'Connor	Katarzyna Kizior

- Top 10 Performances:

The Song during Top 10 Performances is Gotta Work – Amerie

Place	Couple/Person	Style	Show
10	Rafał "Tito" Kryla	Breakdance	Top 8
9	Maria Foryś & Piotr Gałczyk	Dance hall	Top 16
8	Natalia Madejczyk & Rafał "Roofi" Kamiński	Pop	Top 6
7	Diana Staniszewska	Popping	Top 8
6	Magdalena Góra & Zbigniew Karbowski	Contemporary	Top 14
5	Ida Nowakowska & Rafał "Tito" Kryla	Tango	Top 14
4	Rafał "Roofi" Kamiński & Maciej "Gleba" Florek	House	Top 4
3	Natalia Madejczyk & Maciej "Gleba" Florek	Salsa	Top 8
2	Anna Bosak & Maciej "Gleba" Florek	Contemporary	Top 10
1	Natalia Madejczyk & Błażej Ciszek	Jazz	Top 16

- Top 3's solos:

Dancer	Style	Music	Result
Rafał "Roofi" Kamiński	Hip-Hop	Can We Do That Again – Timbaland & Magoo	Runner-up
Anna Bosak	Ballroom/Jazz	I'm so Excited — The Pointer Sisters	3rd place
Maciej "Gleba" Florek	Contemporary	Love's Divine – Seal	Winner

- Results:
  - Winner: Maciej "Gleba" Florek
  - Runner-up: Rafał "Roofi" Kamiński
  - 3rd place: Anna Bosak

== First for any So You Think You Can Dance series ==
- On semi-finale show there was first ever House performance on series ever. It was performed by Maciek Florek and Rafał Kamiński.

== Ratings ==
Episode	Date	Official rating 4+	Share 4+	Share 16–39
Autionons 1	5 September 2007	2,585,169	20.46%	21.92%
Autionons 2	12 September 2007	3,005,117	23.25%	23.93%
Autionons 3	19 September 2007	3,157,210	24.61%	27.48%
Paris Week 1	26 September 2007	2,839,520	22.75%	25.56%
Paris Week 2	3 October 2007	2,354,477	18.35%	18.84%
Live Show Top 16	10 October 2007	2,436,386	22.23%	25.14%
Live Show Top 14	17 October 2007	2,752,179	23.43%	25.94%
Live Show Top 12	24 October 2007	2,717,525	22.22%	24.21%
Live Show Top 10	31 October 2007	2,710,372	22.11%	24.35%
Live Show Top 8	7 November 2007	3,149,694	24.62%	27.23%
Live Show Top 6	14 November 2007	3,192,178	27.16%	30.18%
Live Show Top 4	21 November 2007	2,976,019	21.30%	23.29%
The Final Top 3	2 December 2007	4,386,793	26.64%	26.05%
Average	2007	2,959,699	23.25%	25.15%
