= Kinga Rusin =

Polish journalist

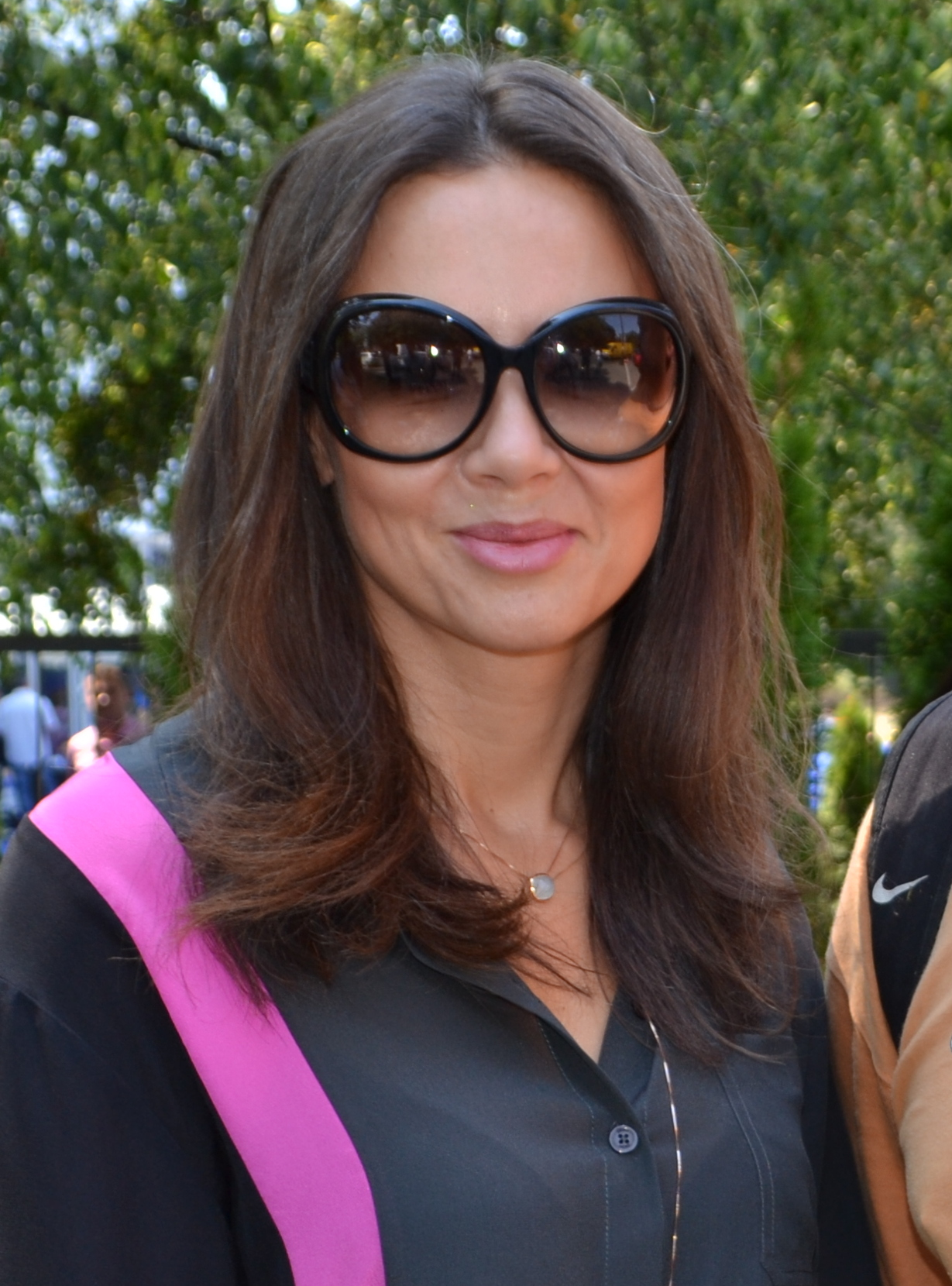
Kinga Rusin, 2015

Kinga Judyta Rusin-Lis (born 9 March 1971) is a popular Polish TV presenter.

She was born in Warsaw. Rusin graduated in Italian studies from Warsaw University. She began her career in media working for TVP (Polish National Television) as a program announcer. In 1994 she left Poland with her husband, Tomasz Lis, and worked as a women's magazines correspondent in the United States.

She returned to Poland with her husband in 1997 and began working for TVN, where she was the presenter of Wizjer.

Since 2005, she has been hosting the popular Polish morning show, Dzień Dobry TVN, and the Polish version of So You Think You Can Dance, Po prostu tańcz. In 2011 she became a judge for So you Think You Can Dance.

In 2006, she came first in a popular celebrity dancing show, during the fourth season of Taniec z gwiazdami (the Polish version of Dancing With The Stars). She danced with Stefano Terrazino. Moreover, she won a special episode of this show called Dancing with the Stars - the most beautiful dances (Taniec z gwiazdami – najpiękniejsze tańce).

She is the owner of the company Idea Media Wende Rusin.

Rusin is a co-owner of the "Pat & Rub" cosmetic brand, established in 2008. She published two books: "What about this life?" and "How to live a healthy and beautiful life, or eco-guide".

== Family ==
She married Tomasz Lis in June 1994. They have two daughters: Pola and Iga. They divorced on June 27, 2006.

Preceded by Rafał Mroczek & Aneta Piotrowska	Dancing with the Stars (Polish TV series) winner Season 4 (Autumn 2006 with Stefano Terrazino)	Succeeded by Krzysztof Tyniec & Kamila Kajak
