= Farma (Polish TV series) season 5 =

Farma
- Season 5
- Presented by: Marcelina Zawadzka; Ilona Krawczyńska; Milena Krawczyńska
- No. of days: 59
- No. of castaways: 21
- Winner: Aksel Rumenov
- Runners-up: Wojciech Wasilewski; Karolina Ura
- Location: Poland

Release
- Original network: Polsat
- Original release: February 16 – May 7, 2026

Season chronology
- ← Previous; Season 4 Next → Season 6

Farma (series 5) is the fifth series of Farma, the Polish version of the reality television franchise The Farm. The season like the previous consists of contestants competing on a farm like it was a century prior and complete tasks to win rewards. At the end of each week, a duel is held where the winner remains and the loser is eliminated from the game. This continues until the finale where the winner wins the grand prize, which has increased to PLN200,000. The season once again is hosted by Marcelina Zawadzka, Ilona Krawczyńska and Milena Krawczyńska with farmer Szymon Karaś returning to guide the contestants with tasks and Beata Oleszek who guide the contestants are food and gardening on the farm. The season premiered on 16 February 2026.

== Finishing order ==
(ages stated are at time of contest)

Contestant	Age	Residence	Entered	Exited	Status	Finish
Wanesa Okarmus	22	Kraków	Day 2	Day 4	1st Evicted; Day 4	21st
Adrian Sikora	27	Wieliczka	Day 2	Day 5	2nd Evicted; Day 5	20th
Wojciech Kossowski	36	Łódź	Day 1	Day 6	3rd Evicted; Day 6	19th
Janusz Stechura	36	Kiczory	Day 1	Day 9	Quit; Day 9	18th
Aleksandra Grudzińska	24	Warsaw	Day 2	Day 10	4th Evicted; Day 10	17th
Magdalena "Peonia" Sienkiewicz	56	Bielsko-Biała	Day 2	Day 13	5th Evicted; Day 13	16th
Wojciech Kisiel	47	Siechnice	Day 1	Day 14	Quit; Day 14	15th
Roland Sztejter	20	Wydminy	Day 1	Day 20	6th Evicted; Day 20	14th
Agnieszka "Lamia" Grochowska	48	Siedlce	Day 1	Day 25	7th Evicted; Day 25	13th
Andrzej Kliś	31	Żywiec/Oslo, Norway	Day 2	Day 30	8th Evicted; Day 30	12th
Ewa Suarez	37	Wrocław	Day 1	Day 36	Quit; Day 36	11th
Łukasz "Janosik" Januszczak	35	Kartuzy/Kühlungsborn, Germany	Day 2	Day 45	9th Evicted; Day 45	10th
Henryk Alczyński	51	Działdowo	Day 14	Day 50	10th Evicted; Day 50	9th
Rafał Ura	42	Dębno	Day 41	Day 53	11th Evicted; Day 53	8th
Aleksandra Gut	28	Łódź	Day 41	Day 55	12th Evicted; Day 55	7th
Agnieszka Białek	28	Łódź	Day 1	Day 56	13th Evicted; Day 56	6th
Dominika Piotrzkowska	34	Zblewo/Haderslev, Denmark	Day 8	Day 57	14th Evicted; Day 57	5th
Paulina Tabędzka	25	Kębłowo	Day 41	Day 59	15th Evicted; Day 59	4th
Karolina Ura	37	Dębno	Day 1	Day 59	2nd Runner-up; Day 59	3rd
Wojciech Wasilewski	52	Działdowo	Day 14	Day 59	Runner-up; Day 59	2nd
Aksel Rumenov	23	Kudowa-Zdrój	Day 8	Day 59	Winner; Day 59	1st

== The game ==
Week	Farmer of the Week	Duelers	Nominated by	Duel Winner	Nominated for Eviction	Evicted	Finish
1	Janusz						1st Evicted; Day TBD
