= Farma (Polish TV series) season 4 =

Farma
- Season 4
- Presented by: Marcelina Zawadzka; Ilona Krawczyńska; Milena Krawczyńska
- No. of days: 40
- No. of castaways: 15
- Winner: Bronisław "Bandi" Bandyk
- Runners-up: Żaneta Hałas; Łukasz "Surfer" Zarzycki
- Location: Mazovia, Poland

Release
- Original network: Polsat
- Original release: January 6 – February 28, 2025

Season chronology
- ← Previous; Season 3 Next → Season 5

Farma (series 4) is the fourth series of Farma, the Polish version of the reality television franchise The Farm. The season like the previous consists of contestants competing on a farm like it was a century prior and complete tasks to win rewards. At the end of each week, a duel is held where the winner remains and the loser is eliminated from the game. This continues until the finale where the winner wins the grand prize of PLN100,000. The season is presented by Marcelina Zawadzka and Ilona Krawczyńska where in addition, hosts alongside Ilona's sister Milena Krawczyńska who is new to the show. Farmer Szymon Karaś returns once again to judge and assist the contestants when needed. He appears alongside new to the show Beata Oleszek who'll judge the culinary aspects of the farm. The season premiered on Polsat on 6 January 2025.

== Finishing order ==
(ages stated are at time of contest)

Contestant	Age	Residence	Entered	Exited	Status	Finish
Julia Grabowska	21	Gliwice	Day 1	Day 4	Quit; Day 4	15th
Wojciech "Ojciec" Gawron	51	Łódź	Day 1	Day 5	1st Evicted; Day 5	14th
Katarzyna Tarnogórska	49	Warsaw	Day 1	Day 10	2nd Evicted; Day 10	13th
Arwena "Arwii" Tarasiuk-Wilczewska	36	Kraków	Day 11	Day 14	Quit; Day 14	12th
Jan Bandyk	19	Lipnica Wielka	Day 2	Day 21	3rd Evicted; Day 21	11th
Patrycja Cieśla	31	Gliwice	Day 1	Day 25	4th Evicted; Day 25	10th
Erwin Kornacki	29	Poznań	Day 11	Day 30	5th Evicted; Day 30	9th
Łukasz "Ananas" Olichwer	36	Zielona Góra	Day 1	Day 33	6th Evicted; Day 33	8th
Wioletta Radzanowska	35	Gdańsk/Hamburg, Germany	Day 1	Day 35	7th Evicted; Day 35	7th
Danuta Gołębiewska	38	Warsaw	Day 3	Day 36	8th Evicted; Day 36	6th
Michał Sokólski	35	Orzysz	Day 1	Day 37	9th Evicted; Day 37	5th
Kaja Jarosz	20	Rozprza	Day 3	Day 39	9th Evicted; Day 39	4th
Łukasz "Surfer" Zarzycki	30	Warsaw	Day 1	Day 40	2nd Runner-up; Day 40	3rd
Żaneta Hałas	37	Blackpool, England	Day 1	Day 40	Runner-up; Day 40	2nd
Bronisław "Bandi" Bandyk	57	Lipnica Wielka	Day 2	Day 40	Winner; Day 40	1st

== The game ==
Week	Farmer of the Week	Duelers	Nominated by	Duel Winner	Nominated for Eviction	Evicted
1	~~Wojciech~~ (Note: Due to Wojciech failing in his duties in maintaining the farm, Szymon removed him as the head of the farm which in turn, revoked his immunity.); Bronisław	Patrycja	Surfer	Patrycja	Julia; Żaneta; Wojciech	Julia; Day 4
1	~~Wojciech~~; Bronisław	Żaneta	Julia	Patrycja	Julia; Żaneta; Wojciech	Julia; Day 4
1	~~Wojciech~~; Bronisław	Wojciech	Szymon Karaś	Patrycja	Julia; Żaneta; Wojciech	Wojciech; Day 5
2	Danuta	Katarzyna	Danuta	Kaja	Katarzyna	Katarzyna; Day 10
2	Danuta	Kaja	Katarzyna	Kaja	Katarzyna	Katarzyna; Day 10
3	Erwin	Patrycja	Erwin	None	Patrycja	Arwii; Day 14
4	Michał	Erwin	Patrycja	Patrycja; Bronisław; Erwin	Danuta; Jan; Surfer	Jan; Day 21
4	Michał	Bronisław	Kaja	Patrycja; Bronisław; Erwin	Danuta; Jan; Surfer	Jan; Day 21
4	Michał	Surfer	Danuta	Patrycja; Bronisław; Erwin	Danuta; Jan; Surfer	Jan; Day 21
4	Michał	Jan	Kaja	Patrycja; Bronisław; Erwin	Danuta; Jan; Surfer	Jan; Day 21
5	Surfer	Ananas	Surfer	Danuta	Ananas; Patrycja	Patrycja; Day 25
5	Surfer	Danuta	Ananas	Danuta	Ananas; Patrycja	Patrycja; Day 25
5	Surfer	Patrycja	Danuta	Danuta	Ananas; Patrycja	Patrycja; Day 25
6	Żaneta	Erwin	Żaneta	Surfer; Wiola; Michał	Erwin; Danuta; Kaja	Erwin; Day 30
6	Żaneta	Surfer	Erwin	Surfer; Wiola; Michał	Erwin; Danuta; Kaja	Erwin; Day 30
6	Żaneta	Danuta	Wiola	Surfer; Wiola; Michał	Erwin; Danuta; Kaja	Erwin; Day 30
6	Żaneta	Kaja	Michał	Surfer; Wiola; Michał	Erwin; Danuta; Kaja	Erwin; Day 30
7.	Ananas	Danuta	Ananas	Danuta	None	Ananas; Day 33
7.	Ananas	Ananas	Danuta	Danuta	None	Ananas; Day 33
8.	Danuta	Kaja	Ananas	Bronisław; Kaja	None	Wioletta; Day 35
8.	Danuta	Bronisław	Kaja	Bronisław; Kaja	None	Wioletta; Day 35
8.	Danuta	Wioletta	Bronisław	Bronisław; Kaja	None	Wioletta; Day 35
9.	None	All	All	Surfer; Kaja	None	Danuta; Day 36
9.	None	All	All	Żaneta	None	Michał; Day 37
9.	None	All	All	Żaneta; Bronisław; Surfer	None	Kaja; Day 39
9.	None	All	All	None	None	Surfer 2nd Runner-up; Day 40
9.	None	All	All	None	None	Żaneta Runner-up; Day 40
9.	None	All	All	None	None	Bronisław Winner; Day 40
