= Maciej Czaczyk =

Polish Roman Catholic priest, singer, and guitarist

- Born: 17 March 1994 (age 32); Szczecin, Poland
- Religion: Catholic Church
- Church: Latin Church
- Ordained: 29 June 2019

Maciej Czaczyk
- Born: 17 March 1994 (age 32); Szczecin, Poland
- Genres: pop, pop rock, blues
- Occupations: singer, guitarist
- Instruments: guitar, piano
- Years active: 2011–2013
- Labels: HQT Music Group, Universal Music Polska

Maciej Czaczyk (born 17 March 1994 in Szczecin) is a Polish Roman Catholic priest, singer, and guitarist. He gained prominence as the winner of the second season of the Polish television talent show Must Be the Music in 2011.

== Biography ==
=== Early life ===
Maciej Czaczyk was born on 17 March 1994 in Szczecin, Poland, to Jacek Czaczyk. At the age of six, his parents enrolled him in piano lessons. His interest shifted to the guitar after his grandfather introduced him to the instrument, teaching him basic chords and inspiring further study. For four years, he honed his guitar skills under the guidance of Waldemar Baranowski from the band After Blues. During this period, he developed a passion for blues, particularly the work of Polish musician Tadeusz Nalepa.

=== Music career ===
Czaczyk performed using instruments manufactured by Gibson Guitar Corporation, primarily a Gibson Les Paul, alongside other Gibson electric guitars. He also used Marshall JCM 900 amplifiers, Marshall and Mesa/Boogie speaker cabinets, and Monster Cable cords.

In June 2011, Czaczyk auditioned for the second season of Must Be the Music on Polsat. His performance of Tadeusz Nalepa's I co earned him a spot in the semi-finals, where he performed Eric Clapton's ballad Tears in Heaven. In the final, he reprised I co, winning the competition through audience votes, securing a 100,000 PLN prize and a performance at Polsat's New Year's Eve event. In November 2011, he appeared as a guest on Polsat's Się kręci.

Following his victory, Czaczyk embarked on a concert tour, supported by musicians Paweł Rozmarynowski, Tomasz Lewandowski, and Tomasz Nawrocki. The tour included performances in Gryfino, Kraków, Katowice, Międzyrzecz, and at the 15th anniversary of the Polsat Foundation at the Grand Theatre in Warsaw. In 2012, he continued performing in cities such as Szczecin, Pyrzyce, Nowogard, Łobez, Luzino, Chojna, and Golub-Dobrzyń.

Czaczyk collaborated with Robert Janson on his debut album. The album was preceded by the singles Nie bój się, Dla Ciebie, and Liście na wietrze, the latter accompanied by a music video filmed in Poznań, Szczecin, and near Warsaw. Liście na wietrze topped the AirPlay chart for the most-played songs on Polish radio.

A magical, pop-rock, sometimes alternative album. I’m glad I met Mr. Robert Janson early in my journey. The album features excellent lyrics paired with diverse music, with the guitar playing many important roles.

— Maciej Czaczyk on his debut album

In February 2012, Czaczyk performed at the Gwiazdy Dobroczynności gala, organized by Newsweek Polska and supported by Polsat, TVP2, and TVN, held at the InterContinental Warsaw. Three days later, he contributed to recording Polsat's new programming schedule at Space Club. In October, he returned to the fourth season of Must Be the Music, premiering Liście na wietrze.

He was nominated for the Bocian award in the Culture category by the Gryfino County starosta for promoting the region. On 4 December 2012, he released his debut studio album, titled Maciej Czaczyk. The album was distributed digitally via iTunes, Deezer, and Muzodajnia. The final single, Sam już nie wiem, was described by Radio Eska as the "biggest hit for the winter break".

On 13 January 2013, Czaczyk and his band performed at the 21st Great Orchestra of Christmas Charity finale at Targ Węglowy in Gdańsk and at the Mechanical and IT School Complex in Lębork.

=== Priesthood ===
After completing his final exams in 2013, Czaczyk enrolled in the Archdiocesan Major Seminary of Szczecin. He was ordained a deacon on 2 March 2019 by Bishop Henryk Wejman at the Szczecin Cathedral. On 29 June 2019, he was ordained a priest by Archbishop Andrzej Dzięga. Following his ordination, he was appointed assistant pastor at the Roman Catholic Parish of St. John the Baptist in Myślibórz. On 27 August 2022, by decision of Archbishop Dzięga, he became assistant pastor at the Parish of St. John the Baptist in Szczecin.

== Discography ==
=== Studio albums ===
Year	Album details	Peak chart position
Year	Album details	(POL) monthly
2012	Maciej Czaczyk: Released: 4 December 2012; Label: HQT Music Group, Universal Music Polska; Format: CD, digital download	73

=== Singles ===
Year	Title	Peak chart positions			Album
Year	Title	POL (Airplay New)	RMF	WiR	Album
2012	Nie bój się	–	3	2	Maciej Czaczyk
2012	Dla Ciebie	–	7	2	Maciej Czaczyk
2012	Liście na wietrze	1	3	–	Maciej Czaczyk
2013	Sam już nie wiem	–	–	–	Maciej Czaczyk
"–" indicates the single did not chart
