= Must Be the Music (Polish TV series) =

- Genre: Talent show
- Directed by: Jan Kepinski
- Presented by: Maciej Rock (1–); Patricia Kazadi (12-); Adam Zdrójkowski (12-); Paulina Sykut-Jeżyna (1–11)
- Judges: Dawid Kwiatkowski (12-); Sebastian Karpiel-Bułecka (12-); Natalia Szroeder (12-); Miuosh (12-); Elżbieta Zapendowska (1–11); Adam Sztaba (1–11); Kora Jackowska † (1–11); Tymon Tymański (11); Piotr Rogucki (7–10); Wojciech Łozowski (1–6)
- Country of origin: Poland
- No. of seasons: 13
- No. of episodes: 136

Production
- Running time: 90–120 min
- Production companies: Intergalactic (1–2); Jake Vision (3–11); Endemol Shine Polska (12-)

Original release
- Network: Polsat
- Release: 5 March 2011 – 8 May 2016
- Release: 7 March 2025 – present

Must Be the Music. Tylko muzyka (series 12 uses a shortened title: Must Be the Music) is a Polish television musical talent competition contested by aspiring singers and musicians drawn from public auditions based on a British show of the same name.

The winning act in the first run of the programme (series 1–11) received PLN 100,000. In the initial televised audition phase as well as the semi-finals and final, contestants sing in front of the judges. and a live audience behind the judges. During the live finals, the public voted for their favourite act, which they wished to keep in the competition.

The show was broadcast on Polsat. In June 2016, the network decided to cancel the show after its eleventh season. The show came back with its twelfth season in Spring 2025. The series had been renewed for thirteenth season that's set to air in March 2026. March 2027.

== Timeline ==
Timeline of coaches
Coach	Seasons													
Coach	1	2	3	4	5	6	7	8	9	10	11	12	13	14
Kora Jackowska †														
Elżbieta Zapendowska														
Adam Sztaba														
Wojciech Łozowski														
Piotr Rogucki														
Tymon Tymański														
Sebastian Karpiel-Bułecka														
Natalia Szroeder														
Miuosh														
Dawid Kwiatkowski														

=== Gallery ===
Current coaches

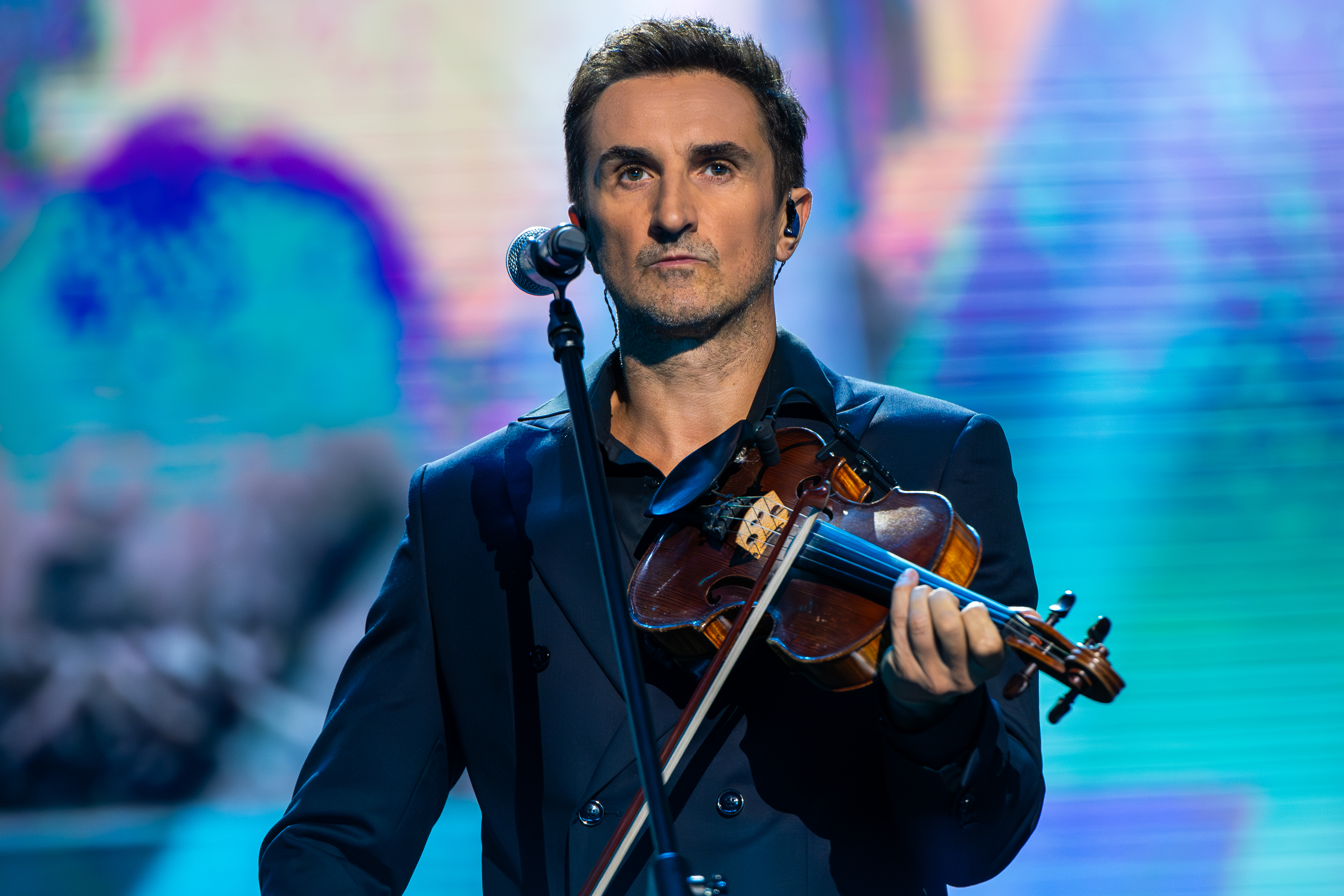
Sebastian Karpiel-Bułecka (12–)

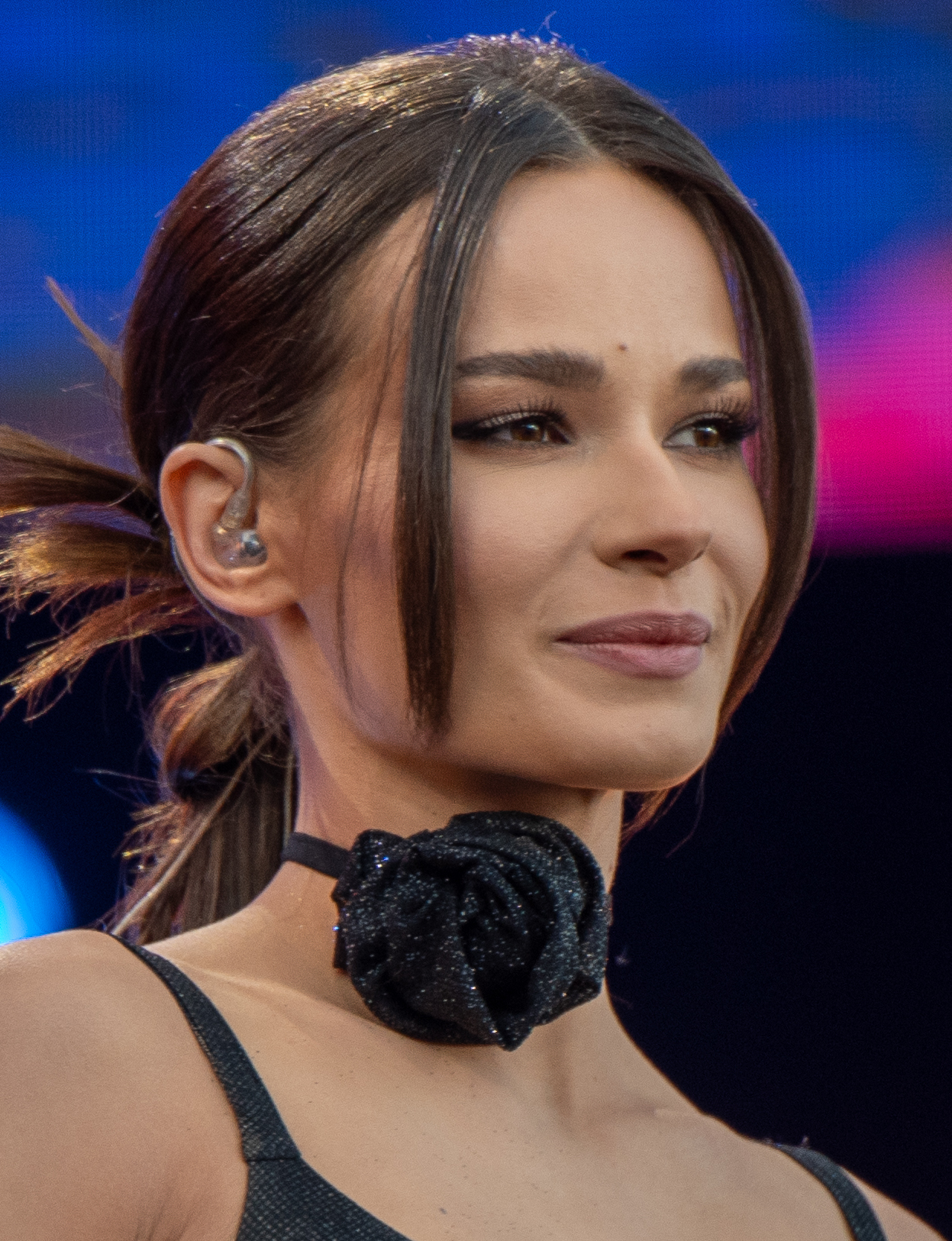
Natalia Szroeder (12–)

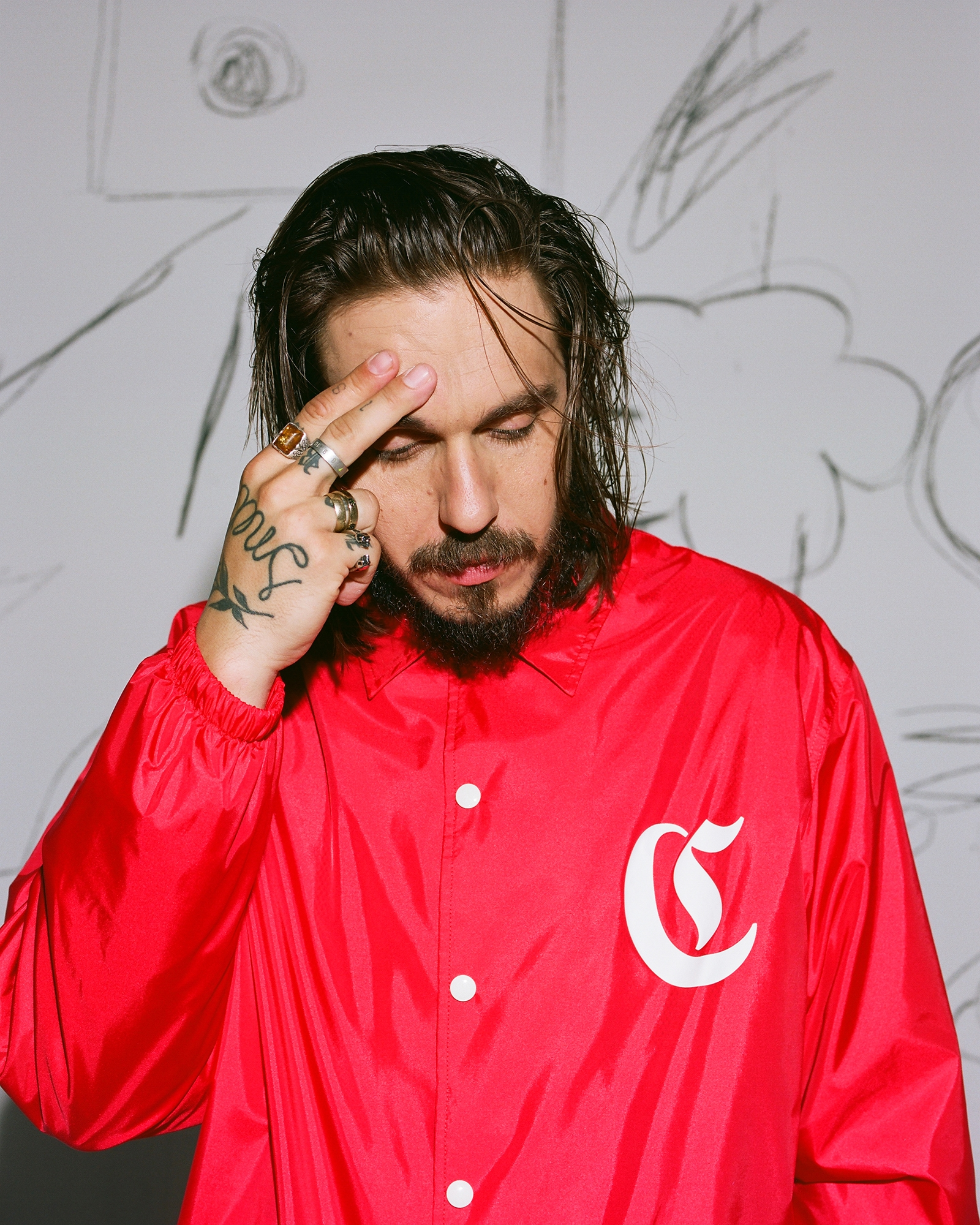
Miuosh (12–)

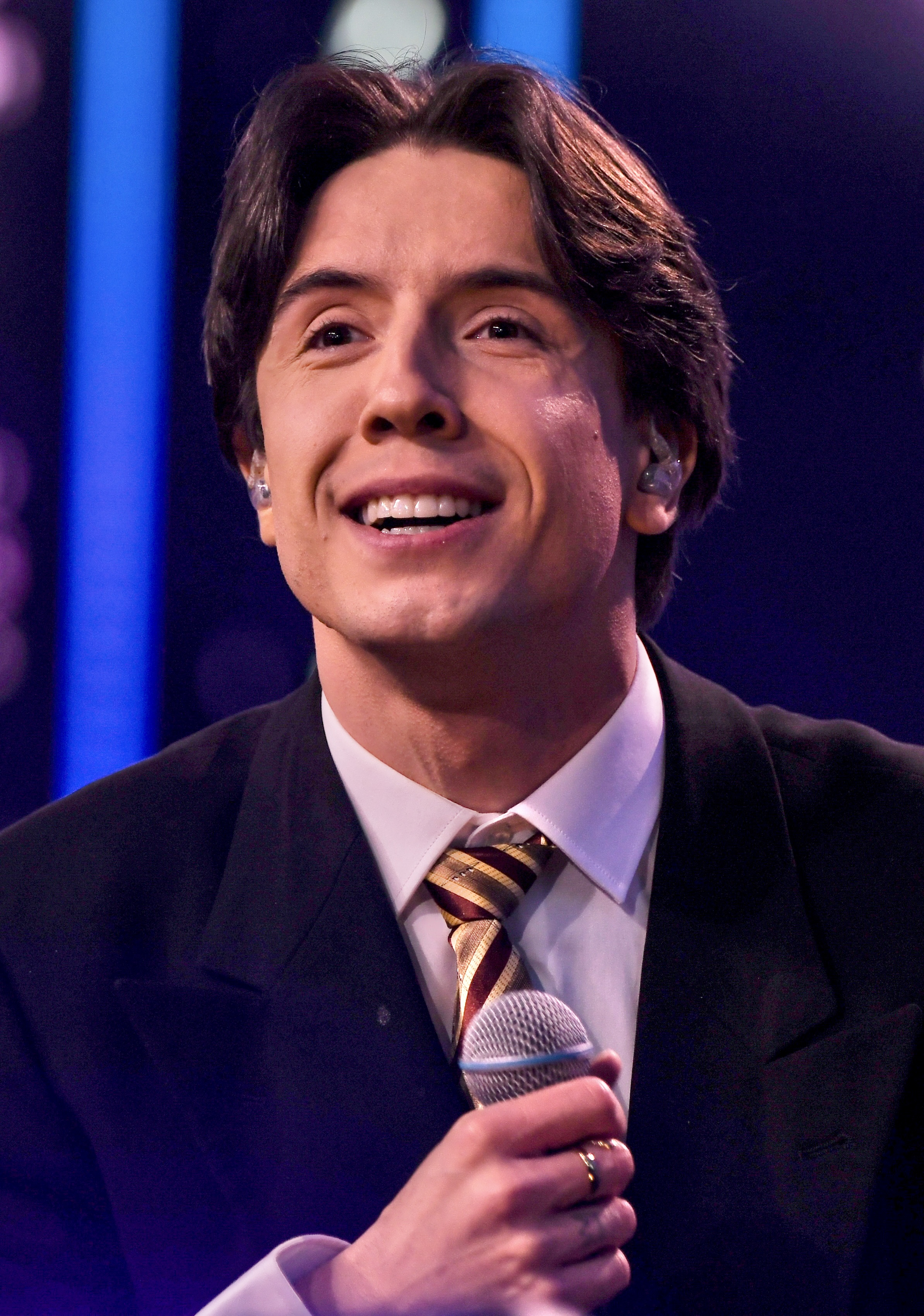
Dawid Kwiatkowski (12–)
Former coaches

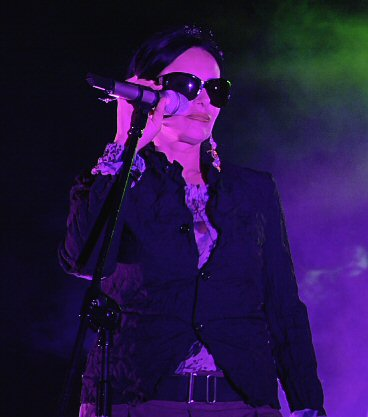
Kora Jackowska † (1–11)

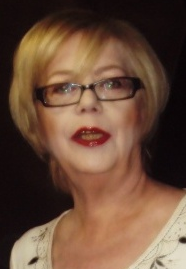
Elżbieta Zapendowska (1–11)

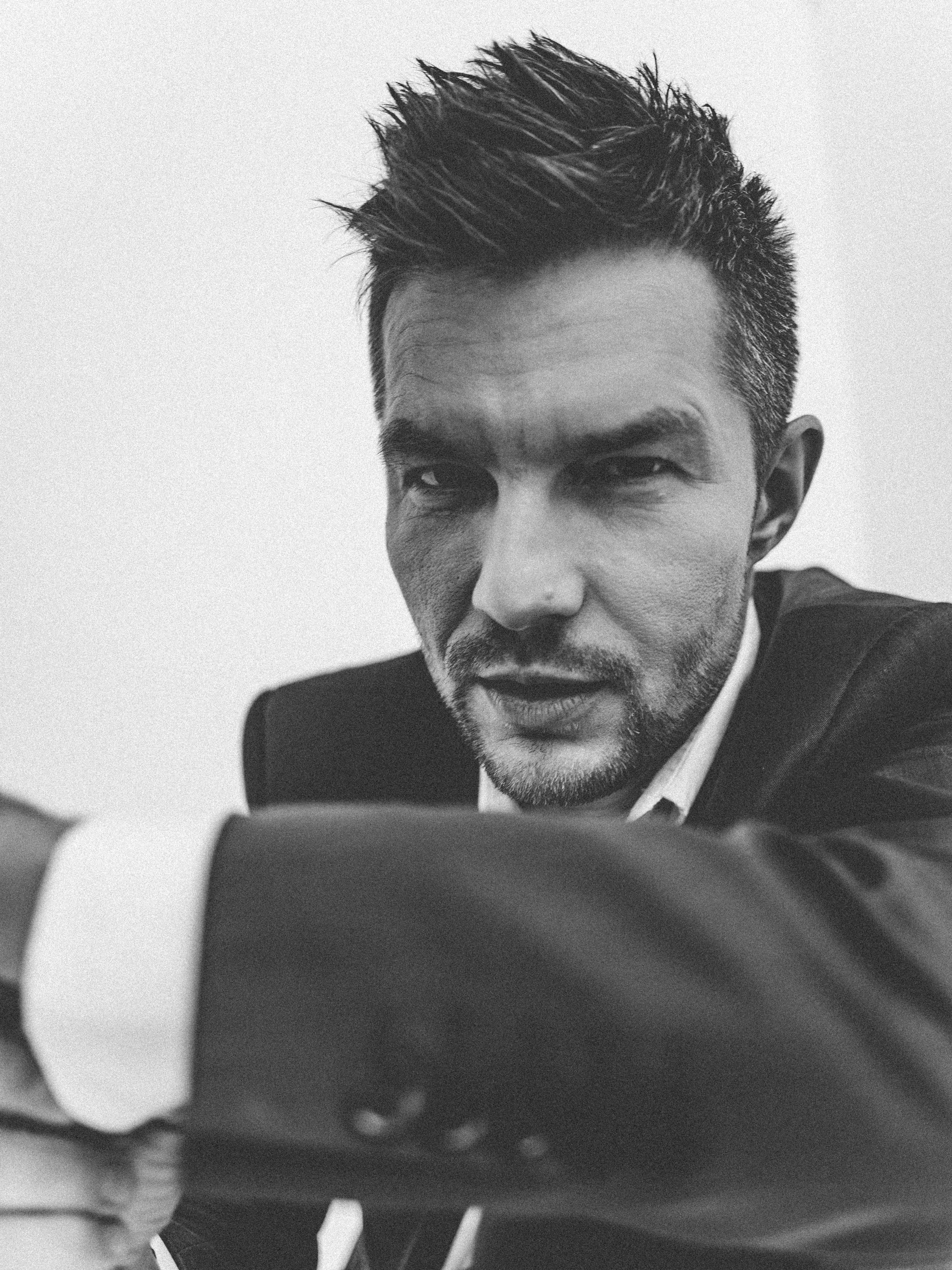
Adam Sztaba (1–11)

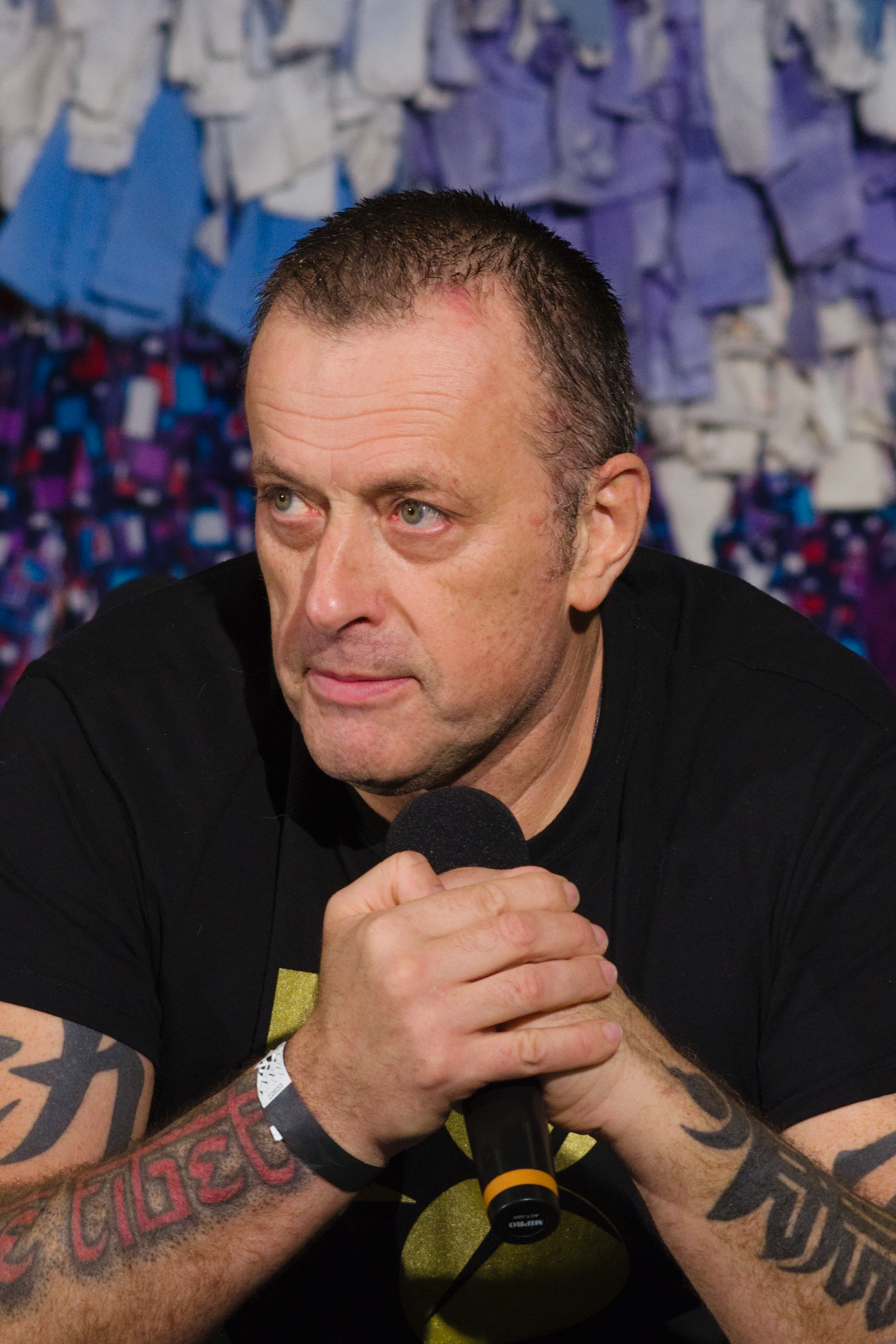
Tymon Tymański (11)

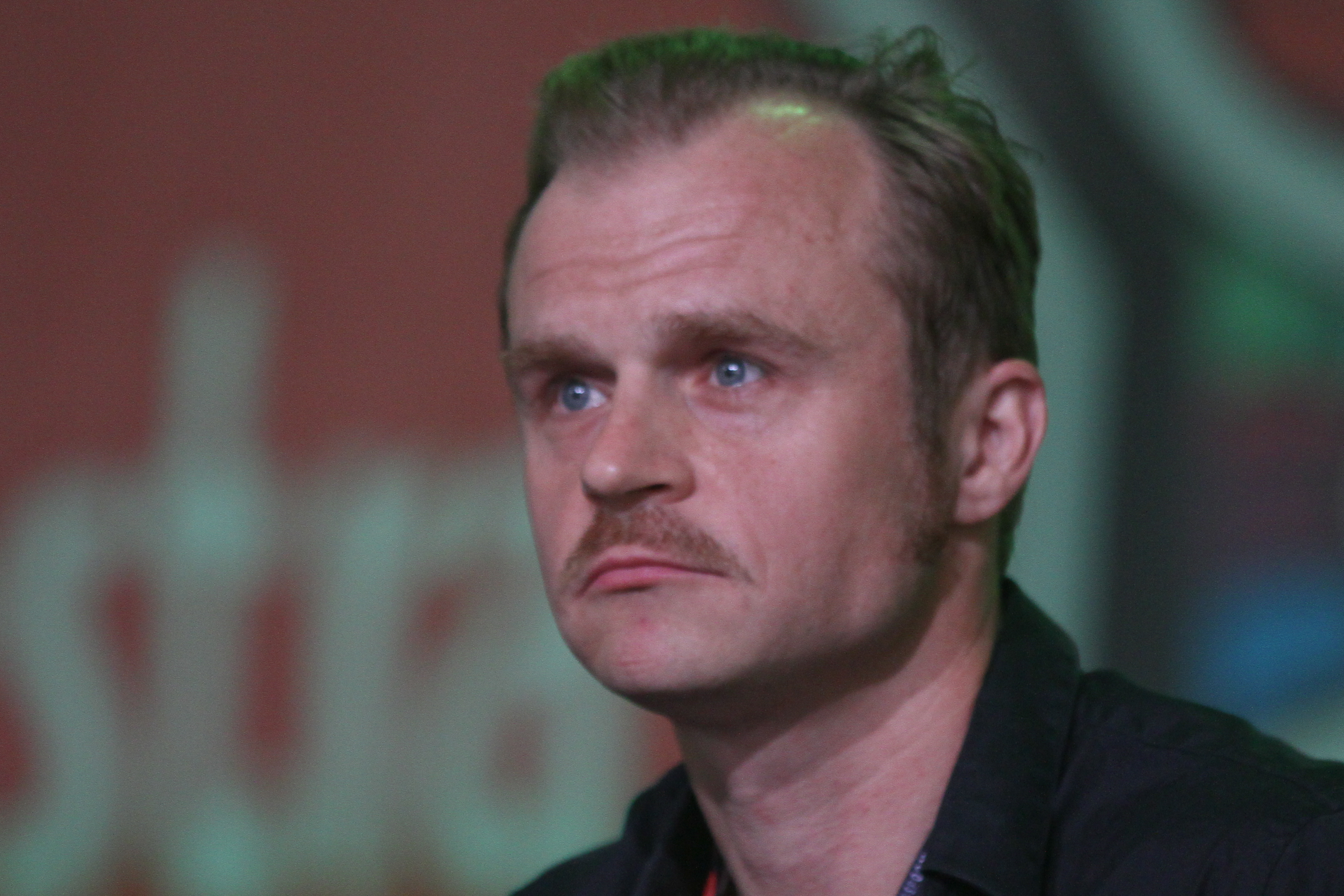
Piotr Rogucki (7–10)

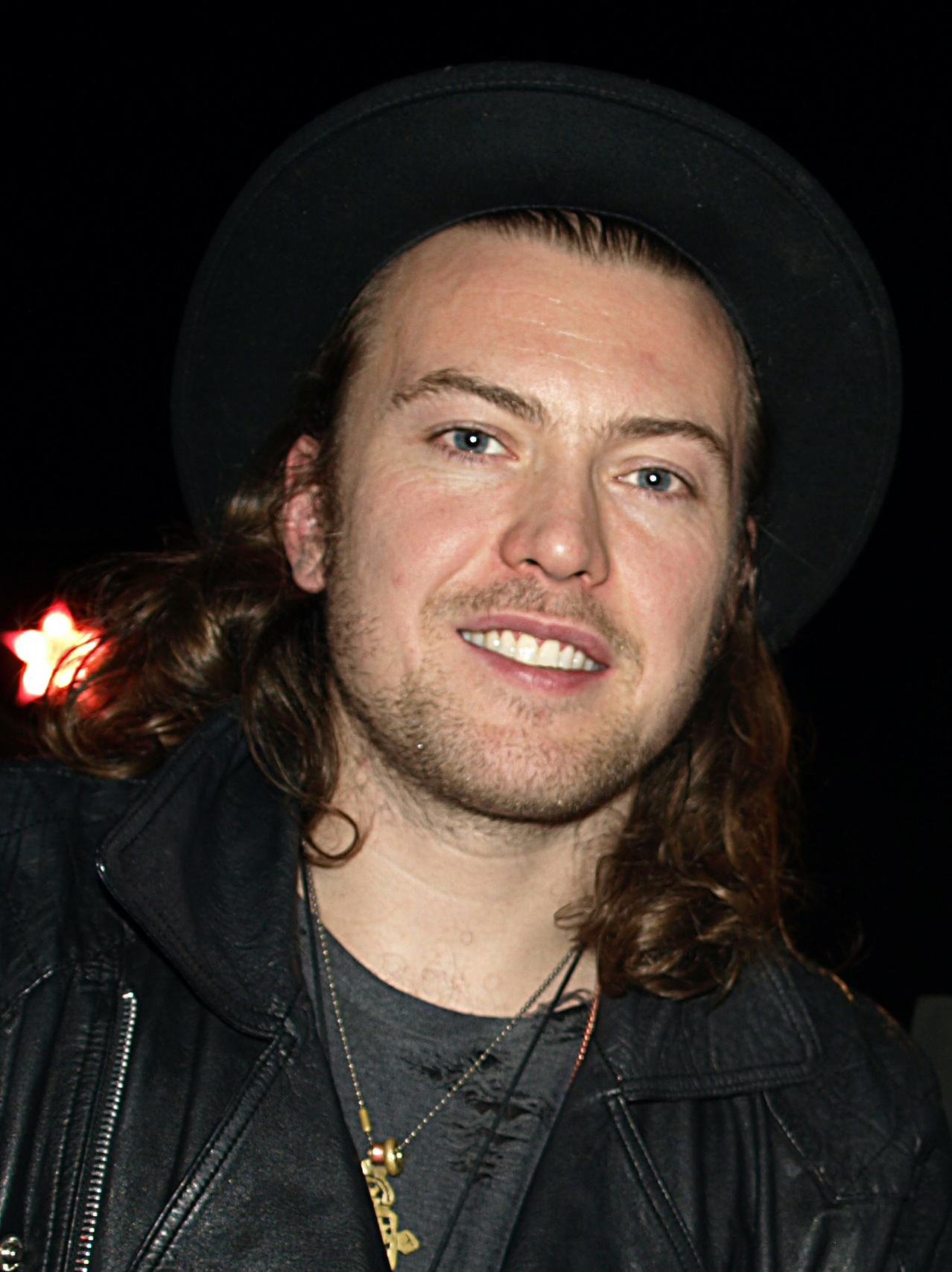
Wojciech Łozowski (1–6)

=== Judges ===
Lineup of judges by seat order
Season	Year	Judges			
Season	Year	1	2	3	4
1	Spring 2011	Wojtek	Kora	Ela	Adam
2	Fall 2011	Wojtek	Kora	Ela	Adam
3	Spring 2012	Wojtek	Kora	Ela	Adam
4	Fall 2012	Wojtek	Kora	Ela	Adam
5	Spring 2013	Wojtek	Kora	Ela	Adam
6	Fall 2013	Wojtek	Kora	Ela	Adam
7	Spring 2014	Piotr	Kora	Ela	Adam
8	Fall 2014	Piotr	Kora	Ela	Adam
9	Spring 2015	Piotr	Kora	Ela	Adam
10	Fall 2015	Piotr	Kora	Ela	Adam
11	Spring 2016	Tymon	Kora	Ela	Adam
12	Spring 2025	Sebastian	Natalia	Mioush	Dawid
13	Spring 2026	Sebastian	Natalia	Mioush	Dawid
14	Spring 2027	Sebastian	Natalia	Mioush	Dawid

=== Timeline ===
Timeline of main hosts
Host	Seasons													
Host	1	2	3	4	5	6	7	8	9	10	11	12	13	14
Maciej Rock														
Paulina Sykut-Jeżyna														
Patricia Kazadi														
Adam Zdrójkowski														

== Results ==
Series	Winner	Runner-up	Third Place	Finalists	Semi-finalists
1	Enej	Conrado Yanez	Tomasz Dolski	Marcin Czyżewski, Little Breaver, PodobaMiSię, Rotten Bark, Piotr Restecki, NOKO	Jazzbratem, Red Lips, Krystian Maliszewski, Rafał Radomski, Tea Time Boogie, Marcin Diling, Hrabia, Sebastian Rutkowski, Michał & Grzesiek, Trio chłopaków, Magda Wasylik, Sway, Daniel Jarociński, Arletta Rzepiela, The Gospel Time, Tomasz Cebo, Heroes Get Remembered, Wiktor Sommer, Daniel Boczniewicz, Boogie Boys, Justyna Jeleń, Paweł Myszczyszn, Olivia Livki
2	Maciej Czaczyk	Eris Is My Homegirl	Marcelina Olak	Raggafaya, InoRos, Natalia Zozula, Kamień Kamień Kamień, Atmasfera, MashMish	Nikola Pustała, Aleksandra Zygmunt, Serge Bourbon-Suszyński, Miesiączek/Niedojadło, Wiesław Iwasyszyn, Wioletta Marcinkiewicz, Roman Wojciechowski, Majestic. Krzysztof Przybyszewski. The Bardons. Ewa Dani-Sikocińska, Dominika Barabas, Renata Sachadyn, Anna Karwan. Wojciech Czarniawski, Dzień Dobry, De Nuevo, Bruk Braders, PLAN, Freex Family, Maciej Czaczyk, Urszula Drożdż, Limboski, Blamed
3	LemON	Najlepszy Przekaz w Mieście	Katarzyna Moś	Tax Free, Michał Kuczyński, Chłopcy kontra Basia, Pocket Size Sun, Klezmafour, Jakub Szyperski, Sebastian „Biały" Białek	Oliwia Wieczorek, Ifi Ude, Tomasz Madzia, Venflon, Jimmie Wilson, Piotr Wiśniewski, Bliss, Hanka!!!, Ustronsky, November Project, Irena, Dominika Kurdziel, Regeneration, CzessBand, Szulerzy, Teddy Jr., Aleksandra Pęczek, Empire Kuba Szyperski, Getho Lamarre, Backstage Acoustic, Mama Selita, Leszek Sypniewski
4	Tomasz Kowalski	Oberschlesien	Maciej Krystkowiak	Przemysław Radziszewski, Iwona Kmiecik, Katarzyna Grzesiek, Piotr Kita, Tune, Bass, Michał Łoniewski	Mateusz Ziółko, Trzynasta w samo południe, Tomasz Mrozek, The Toobes, Olga Matuszewska & Matu, Oho!Koko, Ilona "Potania" Chylińska, Hatbreakers, G.D.P. Squad, Dziubek Band, Jenna Eight, Jan Niezbędny Band, Jamaican Accordion, Beer Coaster, Aneta Majeran, All Sounds Allowed, Alicja Monczkowska, Alicetea, Dolls Insane, Dawid "Klepson" Klabecki, Camero Cat, Brain's All Gone
5	Piotr Szumlas & Jakub Zaborski	Materia	—	Czarno to widzę, Megitza, Katedra, Natalia Pikuła, Ego Trip, Lachersi, Fairytaleshow, Patrycja Baczyńska	Bubliczki, Dariusz Wickowski, Ellie, Hasiok, Future Folk, Hoyraky, Hubert Bąk, Joanna Kaczmarkiewicz, Łukasz Starszy Ryś, MoMo, Naaman, One, Palce Lizać, Paweł Janas, Patryk Kumór, Pawkin, Primetime, Roy, Propabanda East Collective, Sayes, Singin' Birds, Susanna & Aleksander, The Rookles
6	ShataQS	BE.MY	—	Aneta Rzewnicka, El Saffron, Jolanta Tubielewicz, Pora Wiatru	Ewa Lewandowska, Joanna "Soul" Wołoczko, Jadwiga Kuzaka, Yana Bazhychka, Patrycja Nowicka, Liliana Iżyk, Katarzyna Zaręba, Paweł "Bis" Rząsa, Jakub Kusior, Marcin Czerwiński, Łukasz Szczepanik, Rocket, Pajujo, Zgredybillies, Studio Sztama, Babsztyl, Sarcast, Roots Rockets, Mistic. Sandaless, Offensywa, Terra Bite
7	SACHIEL	Dharni & K-Leah	—	Piękni & Młodzi, The Sixpounder, Janusz Cielecki, Kraków Street Band, PeterBeth, Rootzmans, Paulina Czapla, Kasia Świątczak	Klaudia Wieczorek "Kuna", Paulina Czapla, Halina & Julia Cembrzyńskie, Milena Dywan & Marika Janowska, Luiza Ganczarska, Katarzyna, Świątczak, Klaudia Budner, Kamila Adamiec, Karolina Charko, One, The Sixpounder, HERSON, Rootzmans, Afera Blues Group, Kasia Sochacka, Straight Jack Cat, Kraków Street Band, Natalia Walczak, TaLLib, Workplace, Frument Project, Storo, ASIA ASH, Fila Band, Azzja & Hubert, Abraxas Quartet, PeterBeth, Maja Kaszyca, Albo i Nie, Riffertone, Dharni & K-Leah, Wojciech Rakoczy, Błażej Papiernik, Antoni Smykiewicz, Janusz Cielecki, Piotr Tymiński, John Banzaiuml, Waldemar Wiśniewski
8	Besides	Maria Markiewicz	—	Lorein, Patsin M-ski Blue, Cała Praga Śpiewa, BAPU, Paula Brzóska	Blanka & Nocny Koncert, Dimmi Destino, Marzena Gargas, Karolina Głowala, HCR, Amanda Lepusińska, Radioaktywny Świat, Sayes, Underground, Wasabi, Zielone Ludki
9	Marcin Patrzałek	Nina Karpińska	—	Katarzyna Góras, Justyna Sawicka, Black Radio, Roots Rockets, Reggaeside	Wojciech Bochra, Rosa, Romuald Ardanowski, Roxana Tutaj, People of the Haze, Łukasz Boliński & Patryk Komosa, Nicole Skrętkowska, Miąższ, Magdalena Dąbkowska, Hello My Sunshine, Call The Sun
10	Conrado Yanez	Hope	—	Jackpot, The Lions, Iza Kowalewska, Moose the Tramp, Bubliczki	Anna Buczkowska, Joanna Zubkowicz, Jimmie Wilson, Janusz Sztyber, Joyride, Jona Ardyn, Hollow Quartet, Colours of Tango, Animators, Extra, Zielone Ludki
11	Olga Maria Garstka	Michał Matuszewski	—	Anna Cyzon, Piotr Zubek, Joryj Kłoc, Daniel Koszyk, Strain, AdE, FairyTaleShow (FTS), YUUKI, Na Tak, Brian Allan	—N/a
12	Alien i Majtis	Kuba i Kuba	Bonaventura	Dawid Dubajka, Helena Ciuraba, Zosia Karbowiak i Miód, Kuba i Kuba, Bonaventura, Gracjana Górka, Alien x Majtis, Weronika Ryba	Dirty Horns, Aterra, Kajetan Wolas, Hengelo, Ala Mikuśkiewicz, Roland Bilicki & Gypsy Kings, Ania Szlagowska, PoPieronie & Grupa Śpiewacza Poliana, Walimy w Kocioł, Marek Niedzielski
13	Marcelina „Marcycha” Ruczyńska	Piotr Odoszewski	Imasleep	Asia Smajdor, Duet z Pienin, Imasleep, Julia Gawlik, Marcelina „Marcycha” Ruczyńska, Piotr Odoszewski, Robert Wiewióra, Wiktoria „VICKY” Konończuk	Asia Smajdor, Duet z Pienin, Imasleep, Jan Marczewski, Julia Gawlik, Kapela Szczupaki, Laura Moskal, Liván & Latin Boys, Marcelina „Marcycha” Ruczyńska, Maryla Modzelan, Mateusz Gędek, Piotr Odoszewski, Polimorfizm, Robert Wiewióra, Sad Smiles, Wiktoria „Vicky” Konończuk, Zespół GiS
14					

== Viewership ==
Series	Premiere	Final	Episodes	Average
1	5 March 2011	7 May 2011	1–10 (10)	3 420 904
2	4 September 2011	6 November 2011	11–20 (10)	3 321 501
3	4 March 2012	13 May 2012	21–30 (10)	3 493 140
4	2 September 2012	4 November 2012	31–40 (10)	3 352 544
5	24 February 2013	12 May 2013	41–51 (11)	3 254 789
6	1 September 2013	24 November 2013	52–63 (12)	2 724 228
7	2 March 2014	25 May 2014	64–75 (12)	2 475 596
8	14 September 2014	23 November 2014	76–85 (10)	2 427 623
9	15 March 2015	24 May 2015	86–95 (10)	2 282 352
10	6 September 2015	22 November 2015	96–105 (10)	2 089 338
11	6 March 2016	8 May 2016	106–115 (10)	2 003 246
12	7 March 2025	16 May 2025	116–125 (10)	879 000
13	6 March 2026	15 May 2026	126–136 (11)	910 000
13	2027	2027	137–
