= Zielnowo =

Zielnowo may refer to the following villages in Poland:

- Zielnowo, Kuyavian-Pomeranian Voivodeship
- Zielnowo, Pomeranian Voivodeship
- Zielnowo, West Pomeranian Voivodeship
