= Adrian Petk =

Polish footballer

Personal information
- Date of birth: 12 August 2001 (age 25)
- Place of birth: Zelewo, Poland
- Height: 1.79 m (5 ft 10 in)
- Position: Midfielder

Team information
- Current team: Wikęd Luzino
- Number: 16

Youth career
- 2010–2014: Gryf Wejherowo
- 2014–2015: Gedania Gdańsk
- 2015–2018: Lechia Gdańsk

Senior career*
Years	Team	Apps	(Gls)
2018–2020	Lechia Gdańsk	0	(0)
2018–2020	Lechia Gdańsk II	36	(3)
2020–2021	Miedź Legnica	0	(0)
2020–2021	Miedź Legnica II	16	(0)
2021–2022	GKS Przodkowo	17	(0)
2022–	Wikęd Luzino	95	(13)
- * Club domestic league appearances and goals as of 17:48, 5 June 2026 (UTC)

Adrian Petk (born 12 August 2001) is a Polish professional footballer who plays as midfielder for III liga club Wikęd Luzino.

== Biography ==
=== Early years ===
Born in the small town of Zelewo, Petk started training with his biggest local team, Gryf Wejherowo, from the age of 9. After being a prolific scorer with Gryf, Petk started training with Gedania Gdańsk from 2014 to 2015, before joining the youth teams of Ekstraklasa side Lechia Gdańsk in 2015. From 2015 until 2018 he mostly trained with the Lechia Gdańsk Academy, before joining Lechia Gdańsk II and occasionally training with the first team for the 2018–19 season. In his first season with Lechia II, he played 23 games, scoring one goal.

=== Lechia Gdańsk ===
In July 2019, at the age of 17, Petk signed his first professional contract with Lechia, until June 2022.

=== Miedź Legnica ===
On 10 August 2020, he moved to Miedź Legnica.

== Honours ==
Wikęd Luzino

- IV liga Pomerania: 2022–23, 2024–25
