= Waldemar Malak =

Polish weightlifter (1970–1992)

Medal record

Men's weightlifting

Representing Poland

Olympic Games
Bronze medal – third place	1992 Barcelona	– 100 kg

Waldemar Malak (July 17, 1970 in Gdańsk – November 13, 1992) was a weightlifter from Poland. He represented his native country at the 1992 Summer Olympics in Barcelona, where he received the bronze medal in the first heavyweight category of weightlifting.

On November 14, 1992, Malak was killed in a car accident in Charwatynia at the age of 22.
