= Wyszecino =

- Village
- Location within Poland
- Coordinates: 54°30′39″N 18°5′5″E
- Country: Poland
- Voivodeship: Pomeranian
- County: Wejherowo
- Gmina: Luzino
- Population: 481

Wyszecino [vɨʂɛˈt͡ɕinɔ] is a village in the administrative district of Gmina Luzino, within Wejherowo County, Pomeranian Voivodeship, in northern Poland.

For details of the history of the region, see History of Pomerania.
