= Kębłowski Młyn =

- Settlement
- Location within Poland
- Coordinates: 54°36′32″N 18°4′16″E
- Country: Poland
- Voivodeship: Pomeranian
- County: Wejherowo
- Gmina: Luzino

Kębłowski Młyn [kɛmˈbwɔfski ˈmwɨn] is a settlement in the administrative district of Gmina Luzino, within Wejherowo County, Pomeranian Voivodeship, in northern Poland.

For details of the history of the region, see History of Pomerania.
