= Gmina Luzino =

Gmina Luzino Gmina Lëzëno Luzino Commune
- Gmina
- Coat of arms
- Interactive map of Gmina Luzino; Gmina Lëzëno
- Coordinates (Luzino): 54°33′46″N 18°6′11″E
- Country: Poland
- Voivodeship: Pomeranian
- County: Wejherowo
- Seat: Luzino

Government
  - Mayor: Jarosław Piotr Wejer

Area
  - Total: 111.94 km^{2} (43.22 sq mi)

Population (2006)
  - Total: 12,880
  - Density: 115.1/km^{2} (298.0/sq mi)
- Website: http://www.luzino.pl

Gmina Luzino (Kashubian: Gmina Lëzëno) is a rural gmina (administrative district) in Wejherowo County, Pomeranian Voivodeship, in northern Poland. Its seat is the village of Luzino, which lies approximately 11 kilometres (7 mi) south-west of Wejherowo and 41 km (25 mi) north-west of the regional capital Gdańsk.

The gmina covers an area of 111.94 square kilometres (43.2 sq mi), and as of 2006 its total population is 12,880.

== Villages ==
Gmina Luzino contains the villages and settlements of Barłomino, Bożejewo, Charwatynia, Dąbrówka, Dąbrówka-Młyn, Kębłowo, Kębłowska Tama, Kębłowski Młyn, Kochanowo, Ludwikówko, Luzino, Milwino, Milwińska Huta, Nowe Kębłowo, Robakowo, Rzepecka, Sychowo, Tępcz, Wyszecino, Wyszecka Huta, Zelewo and Zielnowo.

== Surface structure ==
According to data from 2004, the municipality of Luzino has an area of 111.93 km², including:

- agricultural land: 49% of the area (5048,8 ha),
- forestland: 42.4% of the area (4743 ha). The municipality constitutes 8.73% of the county's area.

== Neighbouring gminas ==
Gmina Luzino is bordered by the gminas of Gniewino, Łęczyce, Linia, Szemud and Wejherowo.
