= Nowe Kębłowo =

- Village
- Location within Poland
- Coordinates: 54°35′9″N 18°6′45″E
- Country: Poland
- Voivodeship: Pomeranian
- County: Wejherowo
- Gmina: Luzino

Nowe Kębłowo [ˈnɔvɛ kɛmˈbwɔvɔ] is a village in the administrative district of Gmina Luzino, within Wejherowo County, Pomeranian Voivodeship, in northern Poland.

For details of the history of the region, see History of Pomerania.
