= Dąbrówka-Młyn =

- Settlement
- Location within Poland
- Coordinates: 54°33′51″N 18°10′34″E
- Country: Poland
- Voivodeship: Pomeranian
- County: Wejherowo
- Gmina: Luzino

Dąbrówka-Młyn [dɔmˈbrufka ˈmwɨn] is a settlement in the administrative district of Gmina Luzino, within Wejherowo County, Pomeranian Voivodeship, in northern Poland.

For details of the history of the region, see History of Pomerania.
