= Farma (Polish TV series) season 1 =

Farma
- Season 1
- Presented by: Marcelina Zawadzka; Ilona Krawczyńska
- No. of days: 30
- No. of castaways: 15
- Winner: Kuba "Wojna" Wojnowski
- Runners-up: Tomasz Bodziony; Kinga Kazimierczak
- Location: Noteć Forest, Poland

Release
- Original network: Polsat
- Original release: January 17 (on Polsat) – February 25, 2022

Season chronology
- Next → Series 2

Farma (series 1) is the first series of Farma, the Polish version of the reality television franchise The Farm. The series was announced in late 2021 to air on Polsat in early 2022. The first season of the show has 15 Poles live on a farm like it was 100 years ago for 30 days. They have to carry out tasks to earn prizes and luxury for the farm. The winner receives 100,000 zł. The presenters of the show are Marcelina Zawadzka and Ilona Krawczyńska. The season premiered on 17 January 2022 on Polsat (after a pre-release on a streaming platform Polsat Box Go a few days earlier).

== Finishing order ==
(ages stated are at time of contest)

Contestant	Age	Residence	Entered	Exited	Status	Finish
Kinia Kaleta	34	Łódź	Day 1	Day 5	1st Evicted; Day 5	15th
Marta Basandowska	31	Kraków	Day 1	Day 10	2rd Evicted; Day 10	14th
Gosia Karolczak	34	Kalisz	Day 4	Day 10	3nd Evicted; Day 10	13th
Beata Lisowska	39	Radlin	Day 1	Day 12	4th Evicted; Day 12	12th
Iza "Ruda" Staniszewska	50	Łódź	Day 1	Day 15	5th Evicted; Day 15	11th
Marlena "Viki" Paczyńska	23	Poznań	Day 16	Day 20	Ejected; Day 20	10th
Bartłomiej Czyżyk	50	Świnoujście	Day 16	Day 20	6th Evicted; Day 20	9th
Karol Da Costa	31	Kraków	Day 1	Day 25	7th Evicted; Day 25	8th
Monika Idzikowska	43	Sochocin	Day 1	Day 26	8th Evicted; Day 26	7th
Jakub "Zima" Zimowski	37	Mosiny	Day 2	Day 27	9th Evicted; Day 27	6th
Rafał Rzemek	22	Pułtusk	Day 1	Day 28	10th Evicted; Day 28	5th
Karol "Lolek" Kotomski	32	Malta/Warsaw	Day 1	Day 29	11th Evicted; Day 29	4th
Kinga Kazimierczak	20	Łódź	Day 1	Day 30	2nd Runner-Up; Day 30	3rd
Tomasz Bodziony	44	Zakopane	Day 1	Day 30	Runner-Up; Day 30	2nd
Kuba "Wojna" Wojnowski	33	Oslo, Norway	Day 1	Day 30	Winner; Day 30	1st

== The game ==
=== Weeks 1 to 5 ===
Week		Duelers	Nominated by	Duel Winner	Nominated
1		Jakub Z.	Tomasz	Jakub Z.	Kinia; Tomasz
1		Tomasz	Jakub Z.	Jakub Z.	Kinia; Tomasz
1		Kinia	Kinga (Note: Kinga had to nominate last dueler for receiving immunity at the start of the week.)	Jakub Z.	Kinia; Tomasz
2		Gosia	Monika	Izabela	Gosia; Kinga; Marta
2		Marta	Gosia	Izabela	Gosia; Kinga; Marta
2		Kinga	Marta	Izabela	Gosia; Kinga; Marta
2		Izabela	Kinga	Izabela	Gosia; Kinga; Marta
3	Day 12	Beata	Yellow Team	Jakub Z.	None (Note: There were no nominations after this duel. Beata has been evicted automatically for losing the duel.)
3	Day 12	Jakub Z.	Green Team	Jakub Z.	None
3	Day 15	Monika	Karol K.	Karol K.	Izabela (Note: As the Green team has collected more coins in the weekly task, they received the ability to "Automatically Nominate" one member of the opposing team. They selected Izabela.); Monika
3	Day 15	Karol K.	Izabela	Karol K.	Izabela; Monika
4		Bartłomiej	Nominated; Automatically (Note: Bartłomiej and Marlena were automatically nominated to the Duel as new contestants.)	Monika Rafał	Bartłomiej; Kinga
4		~~Marlena~~ (Note: Marlena has been ejected from the farm after refusing to participate in the duel.)	Nominated; Automatically	Monika Rafał	Bartłomiej; Kinga
4		Rafał	Bartłomiej	Monika Rafał	Bartłomiej; Kinga
4		Kinga	Marlena	Monika Rafał	Bartłomiej; Kinga
4		Monika	Karol D.	Monika Rafał	Bartłomiej; Kinga
5		Karol D.	Jakub Z.	Kuba W.	Jakub Z. Karol D.
5		Jakub Z.	Karol D.	Kuba W.	Jakub Z. Karol D.
5		Kuba W.	Jakub Z.	Kuba W.	Jakub Z. Karol D.

=== Week 6 ===
Day	Duelers	Results	Nominated
Day 26	Jakub Z. Karol K. Kinga; Kuba W. Monika; Rafał; Tomasz	Kuba W. - 25 points Karol K. - 15 points Rafał - 11 points Tomasz - 11 points Jakub Z. - 9 points Monika - 3 points Kinga - 1 points	Kinga; Monika
Day 27	Kuba W. & Kinga; Karol K. & Jakub Z. Rafał & Tomasz	Rafał & Tomasz - 1st. place Kuba W. & Kinga - 2nd. place Karol K. & Jakub Z. - 3rd. place	All farmers (Note: After the duel hosts informed contestants that all teams at least once broke the rules of the challenge. Because of that, all farmers have been nominated.)
Day 28	Karol K. Kinga; Kuba W. Rafał; Tomasz	Kuba W. - 1st. place Tomasz - 2nd place Karol K. - 3rd place Rafał & Kinga - Did not finished	Kinga; Rafał
Day 29	Karol K. Kinga; Tomasz	Kinga - Winner; Tomasz & Karol K. - Did not finished	Karol K. Tomasz

== Voting history ==
	Week 1	Week 2	Week 3		Week 4	Week 5	Week 6					
	Week 1	Week 2	Day 12	Day 15	Week 4	Week 5	Day 26	Day 27	Day 28	Day 29	Finale	
Farmer of the Week	Tomasz	Monika	Iza; Karol K.		Karol D.	Jakub Z.	None					
Nominations (pre-duel)	Jakub Z. Kinia; Tomasz	Gosia; Izabela; Kinga; Marta	Jakub Z. Beata	Monika; Karol K.	Bartłomiej; Kinga; ~~Marlena~~; Monika; Rafał	Karol D. Kuba W. Jakub Z.	None					
Duel Winner	Jakub Z.	Izabela	Jakub Z.	Karol K.	Monika; Rafał	Kuba W.	None					
Nominations (post-duel)	Kinia; Tomasz	Gosia; Kinga; Marta	None	Monika; Izabela	Bartłomiej; Kinga	Jakub Z. Karol D.	Kinga; Monika	All farmers	Kinga; Rafał	Karol K. Tomasz		
Kuba W.	Tomasz	Marta	Not eligible	Izabela	Bartłomiej	Duel; Winner	Monika	Karol K.	Rafał	Karol K.	Winner (Day 30)	
Tomasz	Nominated	Marta	Not eligible	Izabela	Bartłomiej	Jakub Z.	Kinga	Jakub Z.	Kinga	Nominated	Runner-Up (Day 30)	
Kinga	Tomasz	Nominated	Not eligible	Izabela	Nominated	Karol D.	Nominated	Jakub Z.	Nominated	Karol K.	Third Place (Day 30)	
Karol K.	Tomasz	Marta	Not eligible	Duel; Winner	Bartłomiej	Karol D.	Monika	Jakub Z.	Rafał	Nominated	Evicted (Day 29)	
Rafał	Tomasz	Marta	Not eligible	Izabela	Duel; Winner	Karol D.	Monika	Jakub Z.	Nominated	Evicted (Day 28)		
Jakub Z.	Duel; Winner	Gosia	Duel; Winner	Izabela	Bartłomiej	Nominated	Kinga	Karol K.	Evicted (Day 27)			
Monika	Kinia	Gosia	Not eligible	Nominated	Duel; Winner	Karol D.	Nominated	Evicted (Day 26)				
Karol D.	Tomasz	Marta	Not eligible	Izabela	Bartłomiej	Nominated	Evicted (Day 25)					
Bartłomiej	Not on Farm				Nominated	Evicted (Day 20)						
Marlena	Not on Farm				Ejected (Day 20)							
Izabela	Kinia	Duel; Winner	Not eligible	Nominated	Evicted (Day 15)							
Beata	Kinia	Gosia	Duel Loser	Evicted (Day 12)								
Gosia	Not eligible	Nominated	Evicted (Day 10)									
Marta	Kinia	Nominated	Evicted (Day 10)									
Kinia	Nominated	Evicted (Day 5)										
Notes	1 , 2, 3	4	5, 6	5 , 7, 8	9, 10	none	11	11, 12	11	11, 13	11, 14	
Ejected	None				Marlena	None						
Evicted	Kinia; 4 of 9 votes to save	Gosia; 3 of 8 votes to evict	Beata; Lost the Duel	Izabela; 5 of 5 votes to evict	Bartłomiej; 5 of 5 votes to evict	Karol D. 4 of 5 votes to evict	Monika; 3 of 5 votes to evict	Jakub Z 4 of 6 votes to evict	Rafał; 2 of 3 votes to evict	Karol K. 2 of 2 votes to evict	Kinga; Fewest votes to win	Tomasz; Fewest votes to win
Evicted	Kinia; 4 of 9 votes to save	Marta; 5 of 8 votes to evict	Beata; Lost the Duel	Izabela; 5 of 5 votes to evict	Bartłomiej; 5 of 5 votes to evict	Karol D. 4 of 5 votes to evict	Monika; 3 of 5 votes to evict	Jakub Z 4 of 6 votes to evict	Rafał; 2 of 3 votes to evict	Karol K. 2 of 2 votes to evict	Kuba W. Most votes to win	

=== Notes ===
- ^Note 1: Gosia joined the farm on Day 4. Because of that she was immune for the first week but was unable to vote.
- ^Note 2: Tomasz as Farmer of the Week received immunity which he can use on himself, or give to someone else. He decided to give it to Kinga.
- ^Note 3: Contestants voted on who they wanted to save, instead of whom to evict.
- ^Note 4: This week was a double eviction. Two contestants with the most votes were evicted, instead of one.
- ^Note 5: This week contestants were divided into 2 teams (indicated by and ).
- ^Note 6: On Day 12 each team had to choose 1 member of the opposing team to a duel. The loser of the duel was automatically evicted.
- ^Note 7: Jakub Z. received immunity for winning the previous Duel.
- ^Note 8: As the Green team has collected more coins in the weekly task, they received the ability to "Automatically Nominate" one member of the opposing team. They selected Izabela.
- ^Note 9: Bartłomiej and Marlena as new contestants have been automatically nominated to a duel. They have been given a task to select themselves the opponents to a duel. Bartłomiej selected Rafał, while Marlena selected Kinga.
- ^Note 10: On Day 20 Marlena has been Ejected from the Farm for refusing to participate in the Duel. Karol D as Farmer of the Week has nominated Monika as a replacement nominee.
- ^Note 11: For the final week, there is no Farmer of the Week or Nomination Ceremony. Instead, all of the contestants participate in the daily challenges in which 2 contestants with the worst results get nominated.
- ^Note 12: Contestants competed as duets in the daily duel. After the duel hosts informed contestants that all teams at least once broke the rules of the challenge. Because of that, all farmers have been nominated.
- ^Note 13: For winning daily duel on day 28 Kuba W. automatically advanced to the finale, making him immune for Day 29.
- ^Note 14: During the finale, the public voted for which finalist should win.
