= Farma (Polish TV series) season 2 =

Farma
- Season 2
- Presented by: Marcelina Zawadzka; Ilona Krawczyńska
- No. of days: 40
- No. of castaways: 16
- Winner: Tomasz Wędzony
- Runners-up: Gabriele Dadej; Urszula Karpała
- Location: Siedliska, Poland

Release
- Original network: Polsat
- Original release: January 2 – February 24, 2023

Season chronology
- ← Previous; Season 1 Next → Season 3

Farma (series 2), is the second series of Farma, the Polish version of the reality television franchise The Farm. The season consists of 16 Poles live on a farm like it was 100 years ago for 40 days. Much like last season, they have to carry out tasks to earn prizes and luxury for the farm. The winner receives 100,000 zł. The season premiered on 2 January 2023 (after a pre-release on a streaming platform Polsat Box Go a few days earlier).

== Finishing order ==
(ages stated are at time of contest)

Contestant	Age	Residence	Entered	Exited	Status	Finish
Wioleta Jończyk	36	Kielce	Day 3	Day 5	1st Evicted; Day 5	16th
Joanna Łukaszczyk	37	Koszalin	Day 2	Day 6	2nd Evicted; Day 6	15th
Shivakumar Shekar	52	Brzesko	Day 2	Day 11	3rd Evicted; Day 11	14th
Natalia "Nati" Topczyńska	33	Gdynia	Day 3	Day 16	4th Evicted; Day 16	13th
Natalia "Ruda" Drogowska	39	Warsaw	Day 1	Day 21	5th Evicted; Day 21	12th
Maciej "Lobo" Linke	50	Bydgoszcz	Day 11	Day 26	6th Evicted; Day 26	11th
Adam Nowak	50	Bydgoszcz	Day 1	Day 29	7th Evicted; Day 29	10th
Edyta Sobczyk	37	Fuengirola, Spain	Day 10	Day 29	8th Evicted; Day 29	9th
Kamil Knut	27	Wieliczka	Day 8	Day 35	9th Evicted; Day 35	8th
Anna Małysa	28	Wrocław	Day 1	Day 36	10th Evicted; Day 36	7th
Paweł Czubkowski	26	Warsaw	Day 1	Day 37	11th Evicted; Day 37	6th
Piotr Czubkowski	26	Warsaw	Day 1	Day 38	12th Evicted; Day 38	5th
Natalia "Młoda" Adamczewska	29	Poznań	Day 1	Day 39	13th Evicted; Day 39	4th
Urszula Karpała	46	Zwoleń	Day 1	Day 40	2nd Runner-up; Day 40	3rd
Gabriele Dadej	26	Kraków	Day 1	Day 40	Runner-up; Day 40	2nd
Tomasz Wędzony	45	Żory	Day 8	Day 40	Winner; Day 40	1st

== The game ==
Week	Head of Farm	1st Dueler	2nd Dueler	Evicted	Finish
1	Anna	Wioleta	Ruda	Wioleta	1st Evicted; Day 5
1	Anna	Joanna	Shivakumar	Joanna	2nd Evicted; Day 6
2	Ruda	Piotr; Shivakumar	Adam; Tomasz	Shivakumar	3rd Evicted; Day 11
3	Adam	Nati; Anna; Ruda	Kamil; Gabriele; Tomasz	Nati	4th Evicted; Day 16
4	Młoda	Piotr	Lobo; Ruda	Ruda	5th Evicted; Day 21
5	Gabriele	Adam; Lobo	Kamil; Paweł	Lobo	6th Evicted; Day 26
6	Tomasz	Kamil; Edyta	Paweł; Adam	Adam	7th Evicted; Day 29
6	Tomasz	Kamil; Edyta	Paweł; Adam	Edyta	8th Evicted; Day 29
7	Młoda	Gabriele; Anna; Piotr	Tomasz; Ula; Kamil	Kamil	9th Evicted; Day 35
8	None	All	All	Anna	10th Evicted; Day 36
8	None	All	All	Paweł	11th Evicted; Day 37
8	None	All	All	Piotr	12th Evicted; Day 38
8	None	All	All	Młoda	13th Evicted; Day 39
8	None	All	All	Urzula	2nd Runner-up; Day 40
8	None	All	All	Gabriele	Runner-up; Day 40
8	None	All	All	Tomasz	Winner; Day 40
