= Magnes (album) =

Studio album by Reni Jusis
- Released: 5 June 2006
- Genre: Dance
- Label: Pink Pong

Reni Jusis chronology
Trans Misja (2003)	Magnes (2006)

Professional ratings
Review scores
Source	Rating
infomusic.pl	link
muzyczna.pl	link
onet.pl	link

Magnes is the fifth solo studio album released by Polish pop singer Reni Jusis. This dance album contains six original songs, one cover song (Ocale Cie by 2 Plus 1), three English-language versions of her older songs ("Single Bite Lover", "Leniviec", "How Can I Ever Forget You") and remixes of the first singles. The first ten tracks segue into each other, like a continuous club set.

== Track listing ==
All tracks are written by Jusis, except where noted.

Standard Edition
No.	Title	Writer(s)	Length
1.	"Magnes"		6:48
2.	"Ocalę Cię"	Janusz Kruk	4:29
3.	"Ginger Girl"	Jusis, Sebastian Mavin Magassouba	4:35
4.	"Mixtura"		5:31
5.	"Go Spinning"	Gaba Kulka	5:24
6.	"Kilka Prostych Prawd"		5:24
7.	"Single Bite Lover"	Mirosław Demucha	3:55
8.	"Leniviec"	Jusis, Jarosław Płocica	4:14
9.	"How Can I Ever Forget You"	Jusis, Demucha	5:39
10.	"Niemy krzyk"		6:51
11.	"Magnes (Tundra & Tayga Latin House Mix)"		7:07
12.	"Kilka Prostych Prawd (Extended Version)"		4:28
Total length:			64:05

== Singles ==
- Kilka Prostych Prawd (pop version, which on album is named Extended Version)
- Magnes
- Mixtura
- Niemy krzyk
