= Robakowo, Pomeranian Voivodeship =

Robakowo
- Village
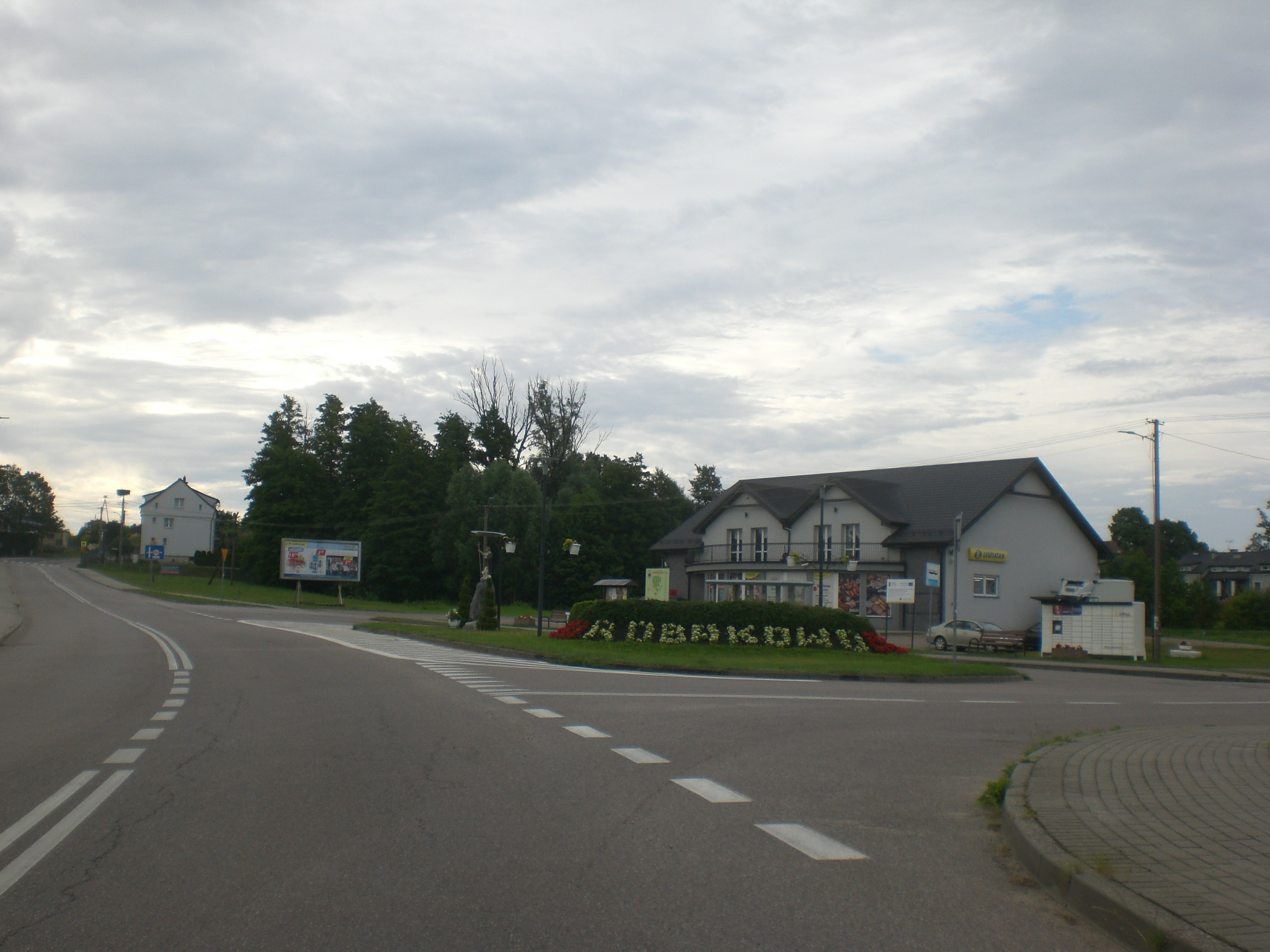

- Location within Poland
- Coordinates: 54°33′41″N 18°8′34″E
- Country: Poland
- Voivodeship: Pomeranian
- County: Wejherowo
- Gmina: Luzino
- Population: 629

Robakowo [rɔbaˈkɔvɔ] is a village in the administrative district of Gmina Luzino, within Wejherowo County, Pomeranian Voivodeship, in northern Poland.

For details of the history of the region, see History of Pomerania.
