= Farma (Polish TV series) =

Reality TV show

Farma is the Polish version of the reality television franchise The Farm. The series was announced in late 2021 to air on Polsat in early 2022. A group of contestants lives on a farm in conditions that existed 100 years ago. They carry out tasks to earn prizes and luxury for the farm as well as nominate and vote for other players to eliminate them from the game. The winner of a season receives PLN 100,000.

Series list

1. The broadcast of the first season on Polsat started on 17 January 2022 (after a pre-release on a streaming platform Polsat Box Go a few days earlier).
2. The broadcast of the second season on Polsat started on 2 January 2023 (after a pre-release on a streaming platform Polsat Box Go a few days earlier).
3. The broadcast of the third season on Polsat started on 8 January 2024 (after a pre-release on a streaming platform Polsat Box Go a few days earlier).
4. The broadcast of the fourth season on Polsat is set to start on 6 January 2025.
5. The broadcast of the fifth season on Polsat is set to start on 16 February 2026.
