= Gmina Lipnica Wielka =

Gmina Lipnica Wielka Lipnica Wielka Commune
- Gmina
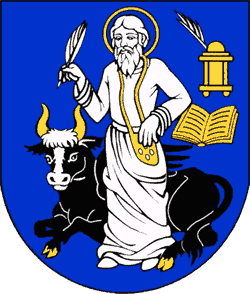
- Coat of arms
- Interactive map of Gmina Lipnica Wielka
- Coordinates (Lipnica Wielka): 49°29′N 19°37′E
- Country: Poland
- Voivodeship: Lesser Poland
- County: Nowy Targ
- Seat: Lipnica Wielka

Area
  - Total: 67.47 km^{2} (26.05 sq mi)

Population (2006)
  - Total: 5,592
  - Density: 82.88/km^{2} (214.7/sq mi)
- Website: http://www.lipnicaw.ugm.pl

Gmina Lipnica Wielka is a rural gmina (administrative district) in Nowy Targ County, Lesser Poland Voivodeship, in southern Poland, on the Slovak border. Its seat is the village of Lipnica Wielka, which lies approximately 29 kilometres (18 mi) west of Nowy Targ and 69 km (43 mi) south of the regional capital Kraków. It also contains the village of Kiczory.

The gmina covers an area of 67.47 square kilometres (26.1 sq mi), and as of 2006 its total population is 5,592.

== Neighbouring gminas ==
Gmina Lipnica Wielka is bordered by the gminas of Jabłonka and Zawoja. It also borders Slovakia.
