= Trans Misja =

Studio album by Reni Jusis
- Released: August 23, 2003
- Genre: Dance; electronic
- Length: 60:45
- Label: Pomaton EMI
- Producer: Reni Jusis; Michał Przytuła

Reni Jusis chronology
Elektrenika (2001)	Trans Misja (2003)	Magnes (2006)

Singles from Trans Misja
- 1. "Kiedyś Cię Znajdę"; 2. "Ostatni Raz (Nim Zniknę)"; 3. "It's Not Enough"; 4. "Let's Play Pink Ping-Pong"

Professional ratings
Review scores
Source	Rating
cgm.pl	4 thumbs up

Trans Misja is the fourth studio album by Polish pop/dance singer Reni Jusis. The album was produced by Jusis and Michał Przytuła, who also worked on Elektrenika in 2001. They wrote most songs while S. Magassouba and M. Demucha wrote English lyrics. Trans Misja is a reminder of the electropop of the 1970s and 1980s. The album contains the hit single, "Kiedyś cię znajdę," which brought the singer back on the charts and is regarded her most famous song, next to "Zakręcona," her first hit from 1998.

Trans Misja was well-received, peaking at #4 on the Polish Album Chart. The album met with a positive reception from critics. It won a Fryderyk Award (Polish Grammy) in the category Album Roku Dance/Electronika/Muzyka Klubowa (Album of the Year Dance/Electronic/Club) and was nominated for Song of the Year and Record of the Year for Kiedyś cię znajdę. A year later, It's Not Enough was nominated for Video of the Year.

== OLiS ==
Trans Misja debuted at #29 on the Polish Album Chart and rose to #13 the following week. It reached its peak three weeks after release, reaching #4. In total, it spent 24 weeks on the chart.

== Track listing ==
1. "Wynurzam się" – 9:05
2. "Kiedyś cię znajdę" – 5:44
3. "Raczej inaczej" – 5:27
4. "Let's play pink ping-pong" – 3:49
5. "Ostatni raz (nim zniknę)" – 4:56
6. "Kto pokocha?" – 5:09
7. "It's not enough" – 4:07
8. "Jeśli zostaniesz..." – 5:45
9. "W zwolnionym tempie" – 5:27
10. "Not real (cyber girl nr 6)" – 5:21
11. "Trans misja" – 5:23
