= Elektrenika =

Studio album by Reni Jusis
- Released: June 25, 2001
- Genre: House; electronic
- Length: 55:02
- Label: Pomaton EMI
- Producer: Reni Jusis; Michał Przytuła

Reni Jusis chronology
Era Renifera (1999)	Elektrenika (2001)	Trans Misja (2003)

Singles from Elektrenika
- 1. "Nic o mnie nie wiecie" 2. "Nigdy Ciebie Nie Zapomnę ("Jakby Przez Sen")"

Elektrenika is the third studio album by Polish singer Reni Jusis. Most of the lyrics and half of compositions were written by Jusis herself. Michał Przytuła is composer of the other half of material. Przytuła who worked with Jusis on her previous projects as a record engineer gets a producer credit with this album.

Elektrenika marked Jusis musical metamorphosis. While her two previous albums were heavily influenced by R&B and Hip-Hop music, Elektrenika was an 80's inspired, electronic record with mostly house and club rhythms. It was her first attempt at a dance music scene. "Electrenic Night Tour" helped Jusis to promote the album and herself as a dance artist. The album spawned two hits Nic o mnie nie wiecie and "Nigdy Ciebie Nie Zapomnę" ("Jakby Przez Sen") which is now known as a Polish club classic.

In 2001 Elektrenika was nominated to Fryderyk Award in Album of the Year Techno/Elektronic/Dance category.

Professional ratings
Review scores
Source	Rating
nuta.pl	link

== OLiS ==
Although heavy promotion Elektrenika sold rather poorly. Album debuted at #23 on Polish Album Chart and it was its highest position on the list.

== Track listing ==
1. "Czuję, że czuję się dobrze"
2. "Nic o mnie nie wiecie"
3. "Dla Ciebie wyjdę z siebie"
4. "Nie dokazuj, nie dokazuj miły"
5. "Pozwól, że zabiorę Cię do domu"
6. "Śniło mi się"
7. "Jutro odpowiem"
8. "Tylu tu ludzi"
9. "Czy czujesz jak płonę"
10. "A nie mówiłam"
11. "Jakby przez sen"
12. "Nic o mnie nie wiecie" (Renix)

== Singles ==
1. "Nic o mnie nie wiecie"
2. "Nigdy Ciebie Nie Zapomnę"
