= Wyszecka Huta =

- Village
- Location within Poland
- Coordinates: 54°31′29″N 18°3′48″E
- Country: Poland
- Voivodeship: Pomeranian
- County: Wejherowo
- Gmina: Luzino

Wyszecka Huta [vɨˈʂɛt͡ska ˈxuta] is a village in the administrative district of Gmina Luzino, within Wejherowo County, Pomeranian Voivodeship, in northern Poland.

For details of the history of the region, see History of Pomerania.
