= Farma (Polish TV series) season 3 =

Farma
- Season 3
- Presented by: Marcelina Zawadzka; Ilona Krawczyńska
- No. of days: 40
- No. of castaways: 16
- Winner: Angelika Kałużna
- Runners-up: Amanda Bokisz; Maciej Rudzki
- Location: Poland
- No. of episodes: 40

Release
- Original network: Polsat
- Original release: January 8 (Polsat); January 5, 2024 (Polsat Box Go) – March 1, 2024

Season chronology
- ← Previous; Season 2 Next → Season 4

Farma (series 3) is the third series of Farma, the Polish version of the reality television franchise The Farm. The season consists of 16 Poles live on a farm like it was 100 years ago and face against each other to win the grand prize of PLN100,000. The main twist this season is that all the starting contestants on the farm were women. No men joined the farm on the first couple of days. The series is hosted again by Marcelina Zawadzka and Ilona Krawczyńska and its broadcast on Polsat started on 8 January 2024 (after a pre-release on a streaming service Polsat Box Go a few days earlier).

== Finishing order ==
(ages stated are at time of contest)

Contestant	Age	Residence	Entered	Exited	Status	Finish
Kamila Rolak	25	Warsaw	Day 1	Day 5	1st Evicted; Day 5	16th
Tomasz "Tomek" Pawełczyk	44	Łódź	Day 6	Day 10	2nd Evicted; Day 10	15th
Piotr Żabicki	49	Warsaw	Day 4	Day 17	3rd Evicted; Day 17	14th
Magdalena Żuchowska	32	Warsaw	Day 1	Day 18	4th Evicted; Day 18	13th
Daria Borkowska	28	Złotów	Day 1	Day 19	5th Evicted; Day 19	12th
Mateusz Sowik	31	Warsaw	Day 15	Day 26	6th Evicted; Day 26	11th
Tobiasz Baraniak	28	Warsaw	Day 3	Day 30	7th Evicted; Day 30	10th
Seweryn Kiełpin	35	Warsaw	Day 4	Day 30	8th Evicted; Day 30	9th
Annie Ostrowska	33	Warsaw	Day 16	Day 32	9th Evicted; Day 32	8th
Marta Suwińska	33	Koszalin	Day 1	Day 35	10th Evicted; Day 35	7th
Marcin Jeliński	31	Gdańsk	Day 3	Day 37	11th Evicted; Day 37	6th
Małgorzata "Margaret" Mikulska	40	Oleśnica	Day 1	Day 38	12th Evicted; Day 38	5th
Renata Zalewska	49	Wysokie	Day 1	Day 39	13th Evicted; Day 39	4th
Maciej Rudzki	23	Radomsko	Day 11	Day 40	2nd Runner-up; Day 40	3rd
Amanda Bokisz	31	Świeradów-Zdrój	Day 1	Day 40	Runner-up; Day 40	2nd
Angelika Kałużna	25	Łódź	Day 1	Day 40	Winner; Day 40	1st

== The game ==
Week	Farmer of the Week	Duelers	Nominated by	Duel Winner	Nominated for Eviction	Evicted
1	Małgorzata	Magdalena	Małgorzata	Marta	Magdalena; Kamila	Kamila
1	Małgorzata	Kamila	Magdalena	Marta	Magdalena; Kamila	Kamila
1	Małgorzata	Marta	Kamila	Marta	Magdalena; Kamila	Kamila
2	Magdalena	Tomek	Marcin	Renata	Małgorzata; Tomek	Tomek
2	Magdalena	Małgorzata	Piotr	Renata	Małgorzata; Tomek	Tomek
2	Magdalena	Renata	Tobiasz	Renata	Małgorzata; Tomek	Tomek
3	Angelika	Małgorzata	Marcin	Amanda (Note: This week there was no duel amongst the nominees, instead there was a duel to decide the new head of farm amongst the ones who made the nominations.)	Małgorzata; Amanda; Marta	None
3	Angelika	Amanda	Daria	Amanda	Małgorzata; Amanda; Marta	None
3	Angelika	Marta	Seweryn	Amanda	Małgorzata; Amanda; Marta	None
4	Amanda	Piotr	Amanda	Seweryn	Piotr; Seweryn	Piotr
4	Amanda	Seweryn	Amanda	Seweryn	Piotr; Seweryn	Piotr
4	Amanda	Magdalena	Amanda	Marcin	Magdalena; Marcin	Magdalena
4	Amanda	Marcin	Amanda	Marcin	Magdalena; Marcin	Magdalena
4	Amanda	Renata	Amanda	Renata	Daria; Renata	Daria
4	Amanda	Daria	Amanda	Renata	Daria; Renata	Daria
5	Marcin	Małgorzata	Marcin	Małgorzata	Amanda; Mateusz; Tobiasz	Mateusz
5	Marcin	Tobiasz	Małgorzata	Małgorzata	Amanda; Mateusz; Tobiasz	Mateusz
5	Marcin	Amanda	Marcin	Małgorzata	Amanda; Mateusz; Tobiasz	Mateusz
5	Marcin	Mateusz	Marcin	Małgorzata	Amanda; Mateusz; Tobiasz	Mateusz
6	Renata	Małgorzata	Marcin	Małgorzata	Tobiasz; Seweryn	Tobiasz; Seweryn
6	Renata	Tobiasz	Małgorzata	Małgorzata	Tobiasz; Seweryn	Tobiasz; Seweryn
6	Renata	Seweryn	Tobiasz	Małgorzata	Tobiasz; Seweryn	Tobiasz; Seweryn
7	Maciej	Annie	Maciej	Marta	Annie	Annie; Marta
7	Maciej	Marta	Maciej	Marta	Annie	Annie; Marta
7	Maciej	Marta	Małgorzata	Marta	Annie	Annie; Marta
7	Maciej	Marcin	Maciej	Marcin	Annie	Annie; Marta
8	None	All		Amanda; Angelika; Maciej		Marcin; Małgorzata; Renata

== Voting history ==
	Week 1	Week 2
Farmer of the Week	Małgorzata	Magdalena
Nominations (pre-duel)	Magdalena; Kamila; Marta	
Duel Winner	Marta	
Nominations (post-duel)	Magdalena; Kamila	
Amanda		
Angelika		
Daria		
Marcin		
Magdalena	Nominated	
Marta		
Małgorzata		
Piotr		
Renata		
Seweryn		
Tobiasz		
Kamila	Nominated	Evicted (Day 5)
Notes	1	
Evicted	Kamila	

=== Notes ===
- ^Note1 : Male farmers entered the farm few days after the game started. Because of that they were immune from nominations.
