= Era Renifera =

Studio album by Reni Jusis
- Released: November 6, 1999
- Genre: Funk; hip-hop; dance
- Length: 48:18
- Label: Pomaton EMI
- Producer: Reni Jusis

Reni Jusis chronology
Zakręcona (1998)	Era Renifera (1999)	Elektrenika (2001)

Era Renifera is the second studio album by Polish singer Reni Jusis. Musically it's a mixture of many genres just like Jusis previous record Zakręcona. Elements of reggae can also be heard. Two cover versions were recorded: Lech Janerka's "Konstytucje" and 10 CC's"Dreadlock holiday".

Era Renifera was nominated to Pop Album of The Year (Album Roku Pop) and Video of the Year (Teledysk Roku) "W głowie woda" on Fryderyki Awards.

== Track listing ==
1. Intro
2. W głowie woda
3. Miej oczy otwarte
4. Konstytucje
5. O.W.Mewa
6. To lubię
7. Dreadlock holiday
8. Śpiew syReni
9. Kombinacje
10. Komunikat
11. Uciekaj - buzi, buzi
12. Przepraszam bardzo
13. Oda do telewizora
14. Idzie Reni
15. To już przesada
16. Era Renifera
17. Peace & Love

== Singles ==
1. Dreadlock holiday
2. W głowie woda
3. Uciekaj - buzi, buzi
4. Miej oczy otwarte
