= Reni Jusis =

Polish pop singer and songwriter

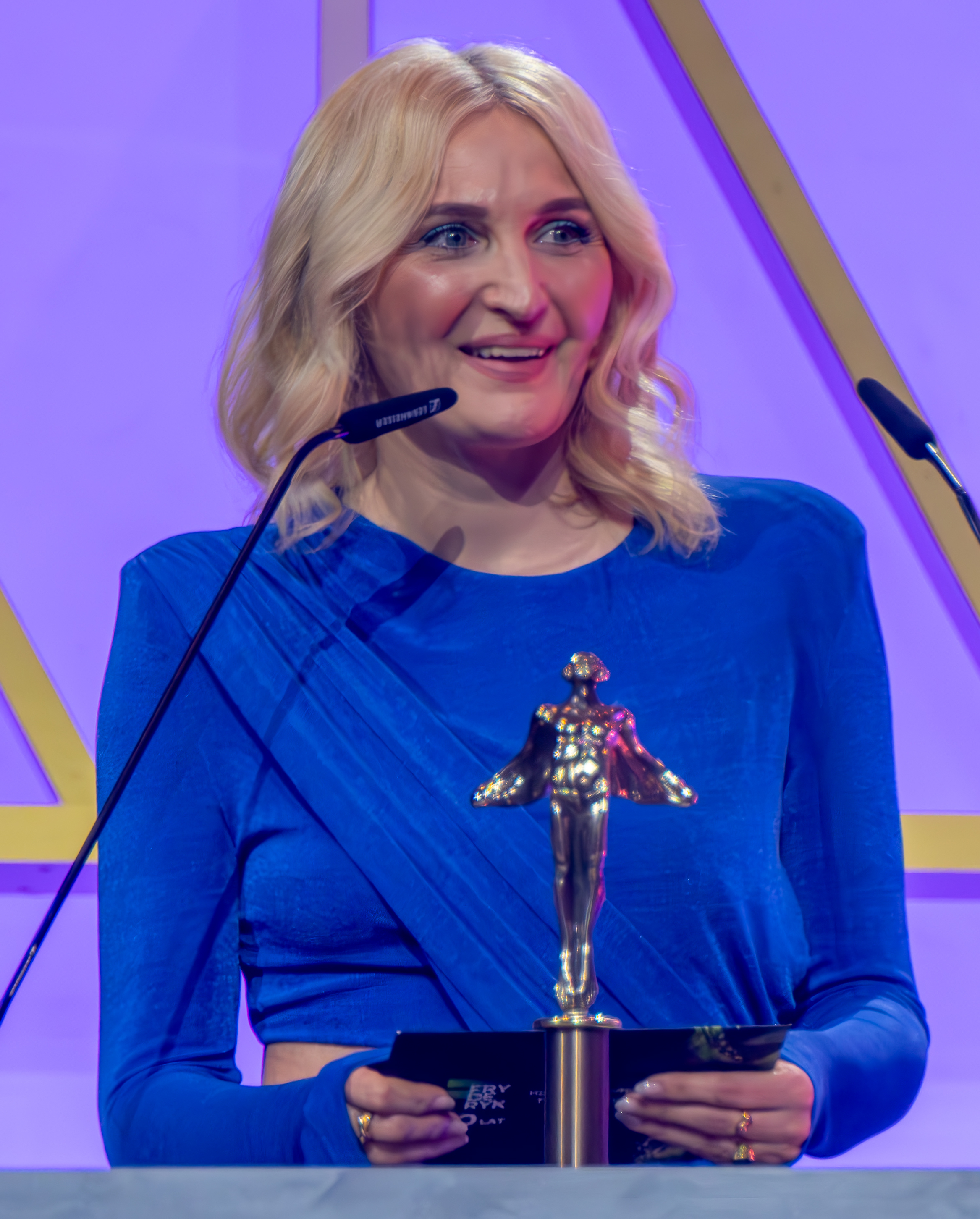
- Jusis in 2024
- Born: Renata Jusis; March 29, 1974 (age 52); Konin, Poland
- Occupations: Singer; songwriter; record producer
- Spouse: Tomasz Makowiecki
- Musical career
- Genres: Pop; dance; R&B
- Years active: 1997–present
- Label: Sony Music Poland
- Website: renijusis.pl

Reni Jusis (born March 29, 1974, in Konin, raised in Mielno) is a Polish pop singer, songwriter and producer. At first, Jusis recorded R&B music, which evolved into electronic dance style in later albums. After ten years of her career, she recorded piano pop music.

== History ==
=== Beginnings ===
Reni Jusis began performing on stage early as a child. Her first success was winning a local vacation song contest. Later she performed in one of the most popular child groups in Poland, Gawęda.

Jusis is musically educated. First she took piano lessons in music elementary school and music high school. In 1993, she performed in the musical Fatamorgana ("Mirage") with the music of her school friend Adam Sztaba at the Baltycki Teatr Dramatyczny in Koszalin. It was the first step in her career, because there she was discovered by music producer and later rapper Yaro.

Yaro offered Reni the chance to be a backing vocalist in his rock band and later he toured with her. They also were a couple. Finally Yaro changed the band's line-up and style. He began making rap music and Reni sang refrains in his songs. They were a support act for the most popular rapper in Poland, Liroy. Thanks to him they met world-famous Polish jazz musician Michal Urbaniak who took them under his artistic care. Together they even created a few songs, but they never were released. Still, Urbaniak recommended Jusis to Polish record companies which brought about her record contract with Polish division of EMI Music. In 1997 Yaro and Reni published the album Yazzda, with smash hit Rowery dwa ("Two Bikes").

=== Solo debut ===
After that success Yaro began work on Reni's solo debut album, which was released next year. The first effect was massive hit Zakrecona ("Twisted"), which gave title for her album. It was released with a mixture of R&B, funk and hip-hop music. All songs were written by Reni mainly with Yaro. In that year Jusis also graduated in choir conducting from the Academy of Music in Poznań. In 1999 the album Zakrecona earned 3 awards of Polish Music Industry Fryderyk Awards for: Best Debut Of The Year, Best Song Of The Year and Best Rap/Hip-Hop Album Of The Year. Reni gained fame and respect of the music industry. Unfortunately artistic and private conflicts caused the end of the collaboration and relationship between Yaro and Reni.

Her second album Era Renifera ("Era of the Reindeer" – a play on words, because word "reindeer" in Polish contains Reni's name) from 1999 also was a mixture of black rhythms, but this time with the addition of reggae. She produced the whole album herself, and also composed and wrote most of the songs. This album contained the very popular cover of 10CC hit Dreadlock Holiday.

=== Music metamorphosis ===
Another album Elektrenika ("Electrenic" – mix of words "electronic" and "Reni") was released after a two-year break and was the breakthrough turn in Jusis' sound for electronic music based on club rhythms, 2-step and house, inspired by the music from the 80's. Almost all lyrics were written by Reni, just like half of the compositions. Another half was composed by her with Michal Przytula, who also produced the whole album with her. Przytula earlier worked with Reni on her previous albums as a record engineer. Elektrenika was promoted by "Electrenic Night Tour" which helped her to gain popularity among the fans of club music. The album brought two big hits, Nic o mnie nie wiecie ("You Don't Know Anything About Me") and Nigdy Ciebie nie zapomnę ("I Never Forget You") known on the record as Jakby przez sen ("Like Through A Dream").

Jusis' fourth album Trans Misja ("Trance Mission" – a play on the words "trance", "mission" and "transmission"), released after another two-year break in 2003, continued the music direction from the previous album, but offered different styles – including songs in the electro-pop style. This time Jusis produced and composed the whole album and wrote almost all lyrics. Michal Przytula remained record engineer and even became Reni's manager. Trans Misja achieved more success than previous albums thanks to three huge hits Kiedyś Cię znajdę ("Someday I Find You"), Ostatni raz (nim zniknę) ("The Last Time Before I Disappear"), It's Not Enough and still more popular club tournee "Top Secret Tour". The completion of this success was another Fryderyk Award, this time for Best Dance/Electronic/Club Album of the Year.

=== Club icon ===
For Reni Jusis' fifth album Magnes ("Magnet"), her fans had to wait three years, until 2006. In the meantime, Reni left her record label and established her own, named Pink Pong Records, connected with Polish division of Universal Music. In the beginning of 2006, EMI released the 5-disc box set Dyskografia ("Discography") containing Reni Jusis' first four albums and a DVD featuring all her solo music videos.

The album Magnes was produced and almost entirely composed by Jusis and Przytuła (as Mic Microphone). Reni also penned almost all the lyrics. The lead single, Kilka prostych prawd ("A Few Simple Truths"), was released in late 2005, nine months before the album. The electro-pop song outwardly signaled that the sound of the new material would be the same as on the previous record. Still, Magnes turned out to be a radical dance album; additionally, all songs were merged into each other, like one continuous club set. This album consolidated Reni Jusis' position as an icon of Polish club music. The release of the album was accompanied by the second single, the eponymous title track Magnes ("Magnet"). Apart from seven new tracks, the album also featured new English language versions of three older hit songs (Leniviec, Nigdy Ciebie nie zapomnę (as How Can I Ever Forget You) and Kto pokocha (as Single Bite Lover) and remixes of album's first two singles. The next singles released from the album were Mixtura ("Mixture") and Niemy krzyk ("Mute Shout").

Magnes also won another Fryderyk Award in 2007 for Best Club Album of the Year. The album was supported by a major club tour, the "Magnes Live Tour". The tour was promoted by a brand new single, Motyle ("Butterflies").

=== Acoustic turn ===
After a nearly two-year break, Reni Jusis announced the release of an album of acoustic music. The album got released in 2009 under the title Iluzjon cz. I ("Iluzjon, Part I") and was promoted by the single A mogło być tak pięknie ("It Could Have Been So Lovely"). It was released by Jusis' own new record label, Amfibia Records. The new project wasn't only a stylistic turning point in her career but also a turn in the way of performing. This time the artist planned to perform in old theatres instead of clubs, because of the album's title, which is the name of the old cinema Jusis used to go to when she was young. Unfortunately sales of this album were so poor that Jusis didn't go on tour. Jusis explained that the sudden turn in her style is caused by the aim of going back to her first musical fascinations. 'The concert of Soyka & Yanina impressed me of all concerts the most,' she spoke. 'It was after this particular concert that I started to think of my own music career and founding a band consisting of eminent musicians. Not until today, after ten-year-long career, I had been ready to take up this challenge', she confessed.

While working on this album she married the vocalist and composer Tomek Makowiecki, on August 8, 2008. On January 1, 2010, Jusis gave birth to their son, Teofil.

In July 2010 Jusis recorded the song Twoją wiarę mam ("I Have Your Faith") for the Polish version of the soundtrack to Walt Disney's Tinker Bell and the Great Fairy Rescue. In February 2011 she dubbed a Polish version of the computer game Test Drive Unlimited 2.

In November 2011 Jusis released her first book, written with Magda Targosz, Poradnik dla zielonych rodziców ("A Guide For Green Parents"), promoting the raising of children in accordance with ecology.

=== Return to dance music ===
In 2016, almost seven years after her last album, Jusis released her new one with dance music, called Bang!. It was released by the Polish division of Sony Music. Her new avant-garde electronic sound was almost entirely created by producer Stendek. Jusis penned all the lyrics. The album was promoted by singles Bejbi Siter ("Babysitter"), Zombi świat ("Zombie World") and Delta, followed by club tournee "Bang! Tour".

== Discography ==
Title	Album details	Peak chart positions	Certifications
Title	Album details	POL	Certifications
Zakręcona	Released: June 20, 1998; Label: Pomaton EMI; Formats: CD, digital download	—	POL: 50 + Gold
Era Renifera	Released: November 6, 1999; Label: Pomaton EMI; Formats: CD, digital download	—	
Elektrenika	Released: June 21, 2001; Label: Pomaton EMI; Formats: CD, digital download	23	
Trans Misja	Released: August 25, 2003; Label: Pomaton EMI; Formats: CD, digital download	4	
Magnes	Released: June 5, 2006; Label: Pink Pong Records; Formats: CD	4	
Iluzjon	Released: April 27, 2009; Label: Universal Music Poland; Formats: CD	8	
Bang!	Released: April 15, 2016; Label: Sony Music Poland; Formats: CD	21	
Ćma	Released: September 21, 2018; Label: Sony Music Poland; Formats: CD	31	
