= Adam Sztaba =

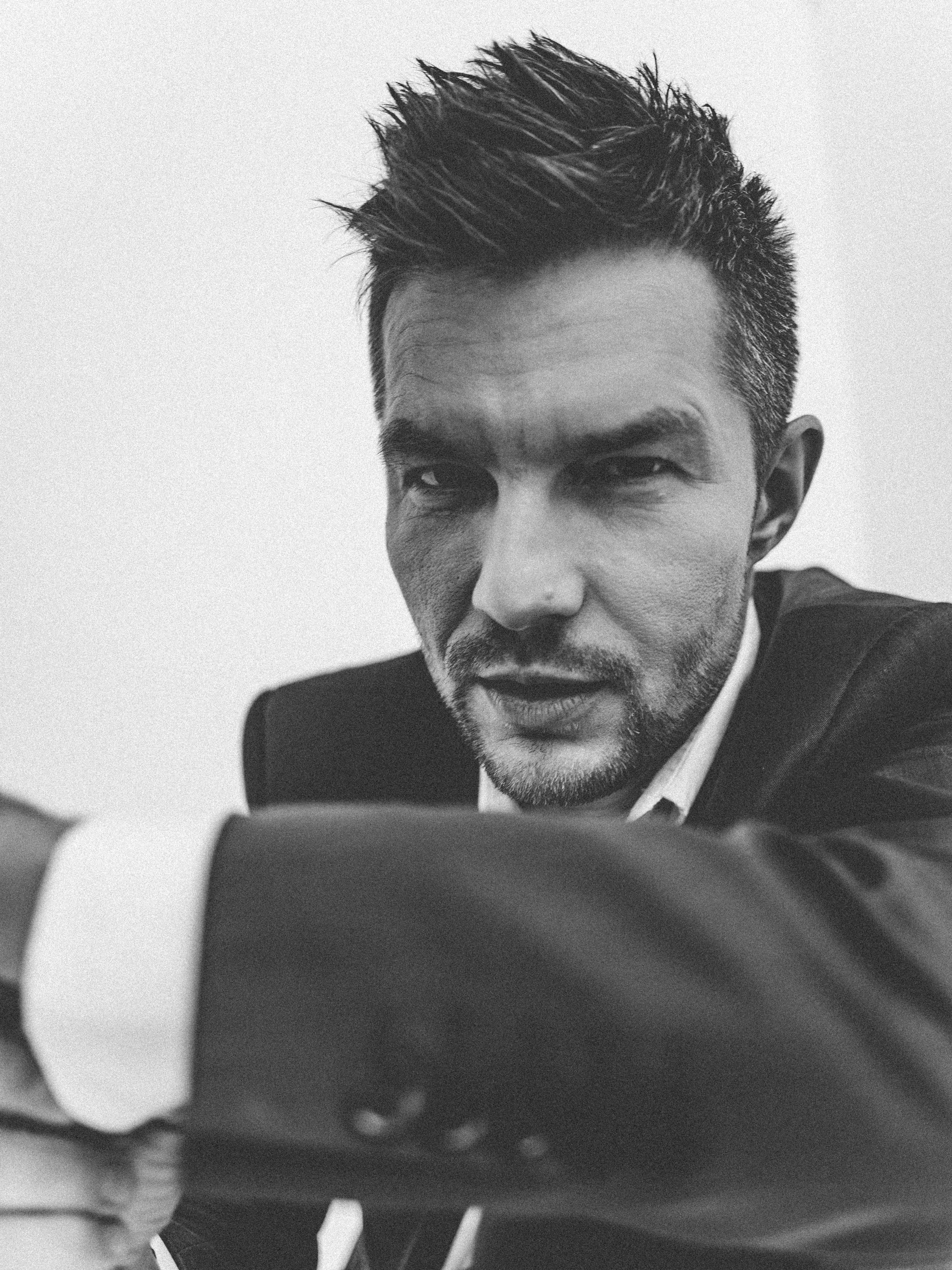
- Sztaba in 2019

Background information
- Born: Adam Marcin Sztaba; 15 February 1975 (age 50)
- Origin: Koszalin, Poland
- Genres: classical music, pop
- Occupations: Composer, pianist, conductor, arranger and music producer
- Instruments: piano, keyboard instruments
- Years active: 1992–present

Adam Sztaba (Polish pronunciation: [ˈadam ˈʂtaba]; born 15 February 1975 in Koszalin, Poland) is a Polish composer, music producer, conductor, arranger, pianist and television personality.

== Career ==
He was born in 1975 in Koszalin. He studied at the Musical High School in Koszalin and subsequently graduated in composition from Fryderyk Chopin Music Academy (now Chopin University of Music) under Professor Zbigniew Rudziński.

He made his debut at age 18 by composing music for the musical Mirage? In 2003, together with Tomasz Filipczak, he composed the music for the first Polish show dance "Opentaniec". In 2005 he founded the Adam Sztaba Orchestra. He was the musical director, arranger and conductor of many well-known television programs, including Idol (Polish edition), SOPOT FESTIVAL 2005 and 2006, and Dancing with the Stars (Polish edition of Strictly Come Dancing). In 2008 he was the director of the academy of the television program Star Academy (Polish edition). He also composed and recorded music for the 2009 film From Full To Full. In September 2010 he was music director of the inauguration of the European Special Olympic Games 2010 in Warsaw.

In December 2010 he performed with Sting and conducted the Polish Radio Symphony Orchestra in a concert to celebrate the 85th anniversary of the Polish Radio. In July 2011 he was the music director of the concert on the occasion of the beginning of Poland's EU Presidency and performed with Chris Botti, Dolores O'Riordan, Michael Bolton and Kenny G. He was a judge in the Polish edition of the TV show Must Be the Music. In 2016 he was musical director and conductor of the World Youth Day 2016 in Kraków, the musical highlight of which was the concert titled "Credo in Misericordiam Dei" with almost 2 million pilgrims attending.

He is an author of numerous symphony pieces and works for film and theatre, often commissioned by Polish cultural institutions and individual artists. His recent works include "Leopoldinum", "Polonaise" and "Riffenuto" composed for the Polish Institute of Music and Dance and included in an educational app Orkiestrownik.

His compositions have roots in Polish folk music. He often adds a rhythm section or electronics to his orchestral pieces. Consequently, he also frequently conducts contemporary orchestral works with an enhanced rhythmic element.

He has been sharing his knowledge and skills with young composers and arrangers through nationwide workshops. He annually conducts charity summer concerts in Zakopane, organised by Pro Artis Foundation for young disabled singers, where the participants share their passion for the folk music heritage of the Polish mountains.

Since January 2020, Adam Sztaba has been the music director and the conductor of the Man of La Mancha musical (directress - Anna Wieczur - Bluszcz), staged in Dramatic Theatre of Warsaw.

He has collaborated with many Polish and international artists such as: Sting, Michael Bolton, Dolores O'Riordan, Caro Emerald, Quincy Jones, Lemar, Dita von Teese, The Cranberries, Chris Botti, José Carreras, Edyta Górniak, Lutricia McNeal, Kayah, Ania Dąbrowska, Violetta Villas, Maryla Rodowicz, Natalia Kukulska, Reni Jusis, Kasia Kowalska, Kenny G, Ewa Malas-Godlewska, Lemar, NDR Bigband, Ive Mendes, Terence Blnachard, Helena Vondráčková, Katarzyna Groniec, Halina Frąckowiak, José Cura, Grzegorz Turnau, Seweryn Krajewski, Janusz Józefowicz, Drupi, Karel Gott, Krzysztof Krawczyk, Przemysław Gintrowski, Piotr Cugowski, Perfect, Sinfonia Varsovia, Atom String Quartet, Grupa MoCarta, Polish Radio Symphony Orchestra, Polish National Radio Symphony Orchestra.

== Filmography ==
- Wrota Europy (1999, music)
- Świąteczna przygoda (2000, music)
- Niania, episode 1 (2005, as a pianist)
- Niania, episode 38 (2006, as a pianist)
- Kryminalni, (2006, music)
- Od pełni do pełni (2009, music)
- Pierwsza miłość (2010, as himself)
- Do Dzwonka Cafe (2012, as himself)

== See also ==
- Music of Poland
- List of Polish composers
