= Zelewo =

- Village
- Location within Poland
- Coordinates: 54°37′26″N 18°4′18″E
- Country: Poland
- Voivodeship: Pomeranian
- County: Wejherowo
- Gmina: Luzino
- Population: 371

Zelewo [zɛˈlɛvɔ] is a village in the administrative district of Gmina Luzino, within Wejherowo County, Pomeranian Voivodeship, in northern Poland.

For details of the history of the region, see History of Pomerania.
