= Kiczory, Lesser Poland Voivodeship =

Kiczory
- Village
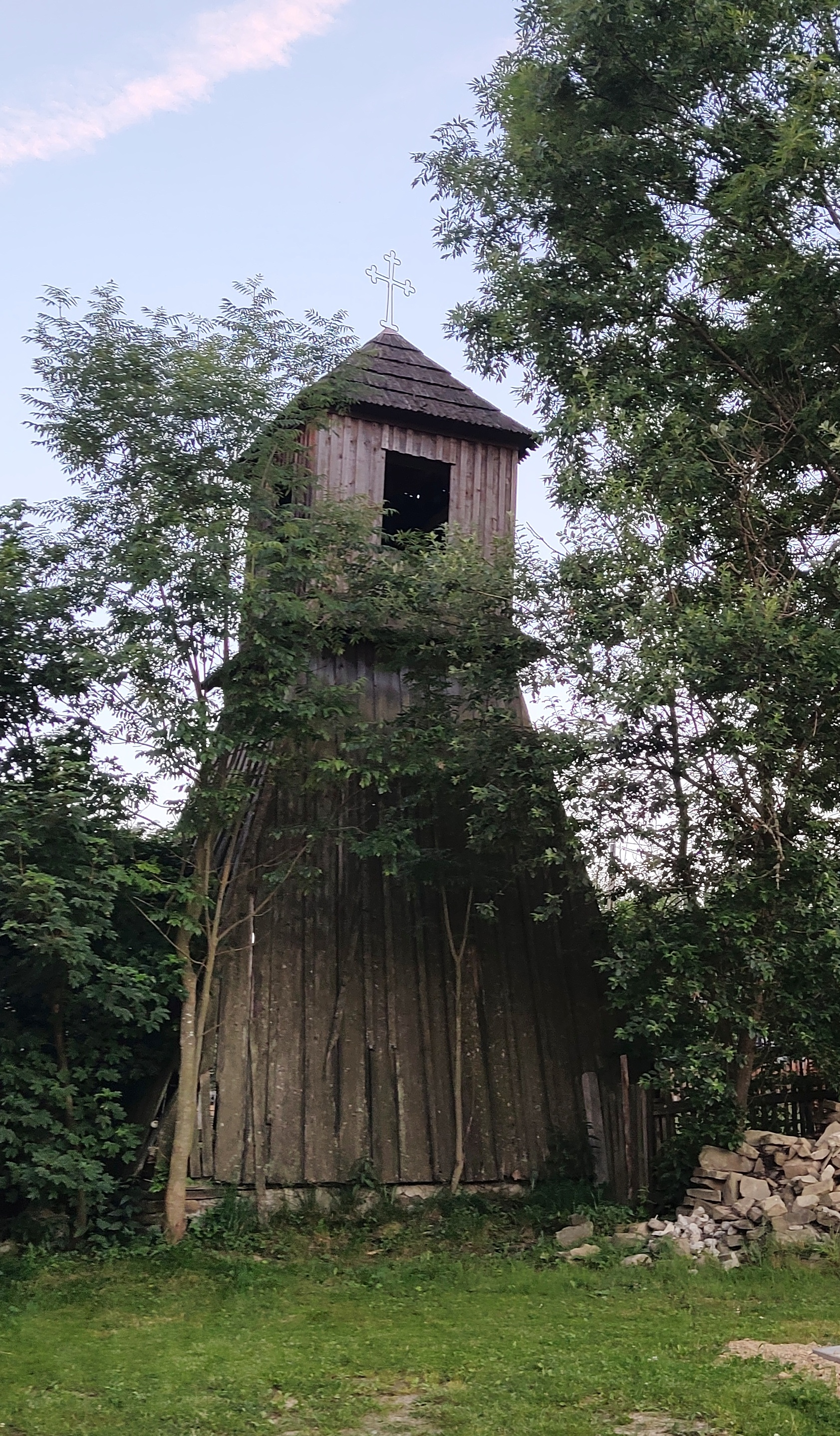
- Bell tower

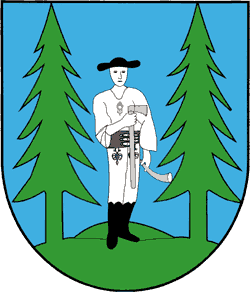
- Coat of arms

- Location within Poland
- Coordinates: 49°32′43″N 19°32′43″E
- Country: Poland
- Voivodeship: Lesser Poland
- County: Nowy Targ
- Gmina: Lipnica Wielka
- Elevation: 750 m (2,460 ft)

Population
  - Total: 500
- Time zone: UTC+1 (CET)
  - Summer (DST): UTC+2 (CEST)
- Vehicle registration: KNT

Kiczory [kiˈt͡ʂɔrɨ] is a village in the administrative district of Gmina Lipnica Wielka, within Nowy Targ County, Lesser Poland Voivodeship, in southern Poland, close to the border with Slovakia.

The village lies in the drainage basin of the Black Sea (through Orava, Váh and Danube rivers), in the historical region of Orava (Polish: Orawa).

== History ==
The area became part of Poland in the 10th or early 11th century, and later it passed to Hungary. It became again part of Poland following World War I.
