= Kębłowo, Pomeranian Voivodeship =

Kębłowo
- Village
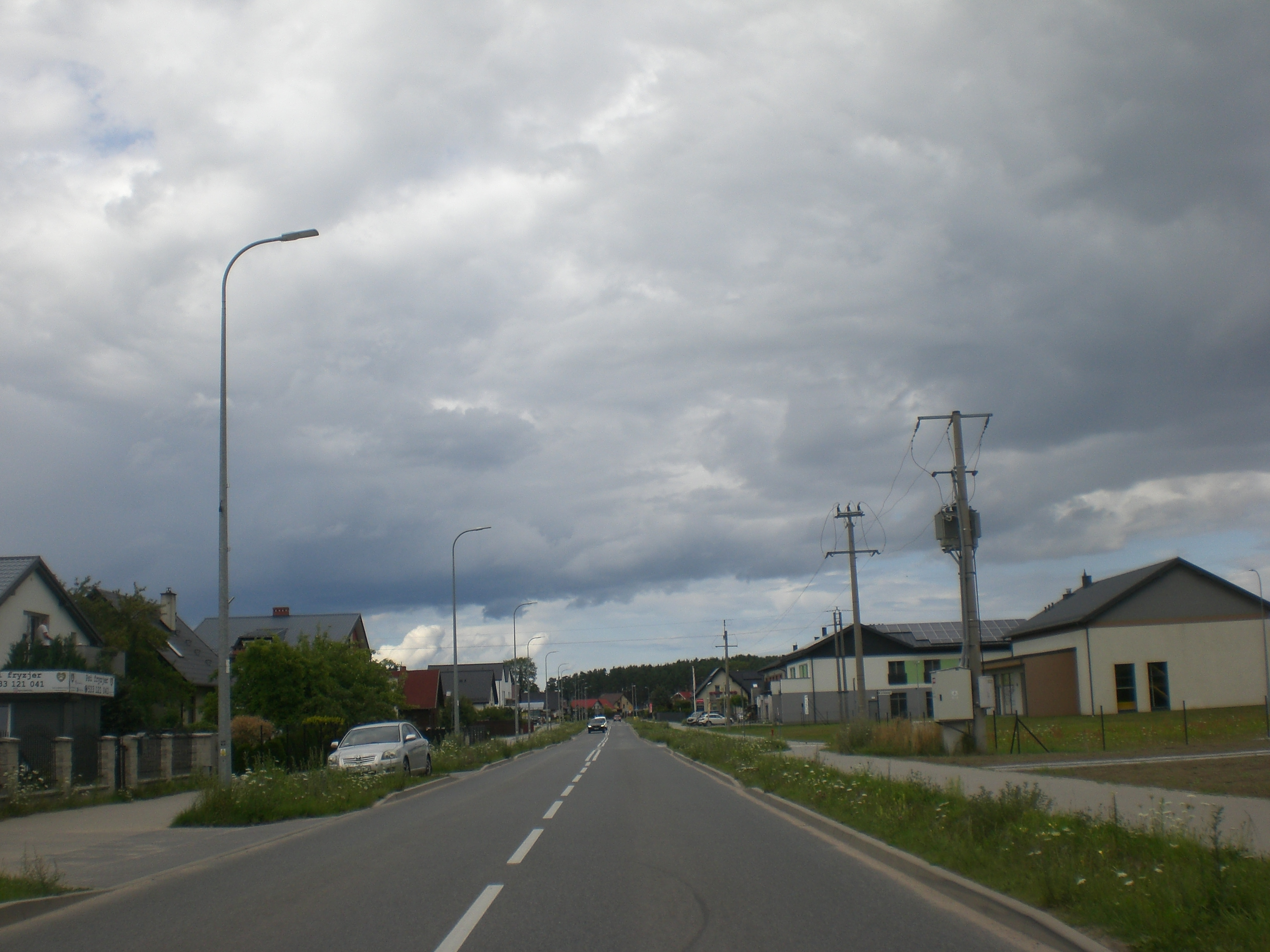

- Location within Poland
- Coordinates: 54°35′46″N 18°5′52″E
- Country: Poland
- Voivodeship: Pomeranian
- County: Wejherowo
- Gmina: Luzino
- Population: 1,610

Kębłowo [kɛmˈbwɔvɔ] is a village in the administrative district of Gmina Luzino, within Wejherowo County, Pomeranian Voivodeship, in northern Poland.

For details of the history of the region, see History of Pomerania.
