= Lipnica Wielka, Nowy Targ County =

Lipnica Wielka
- Village
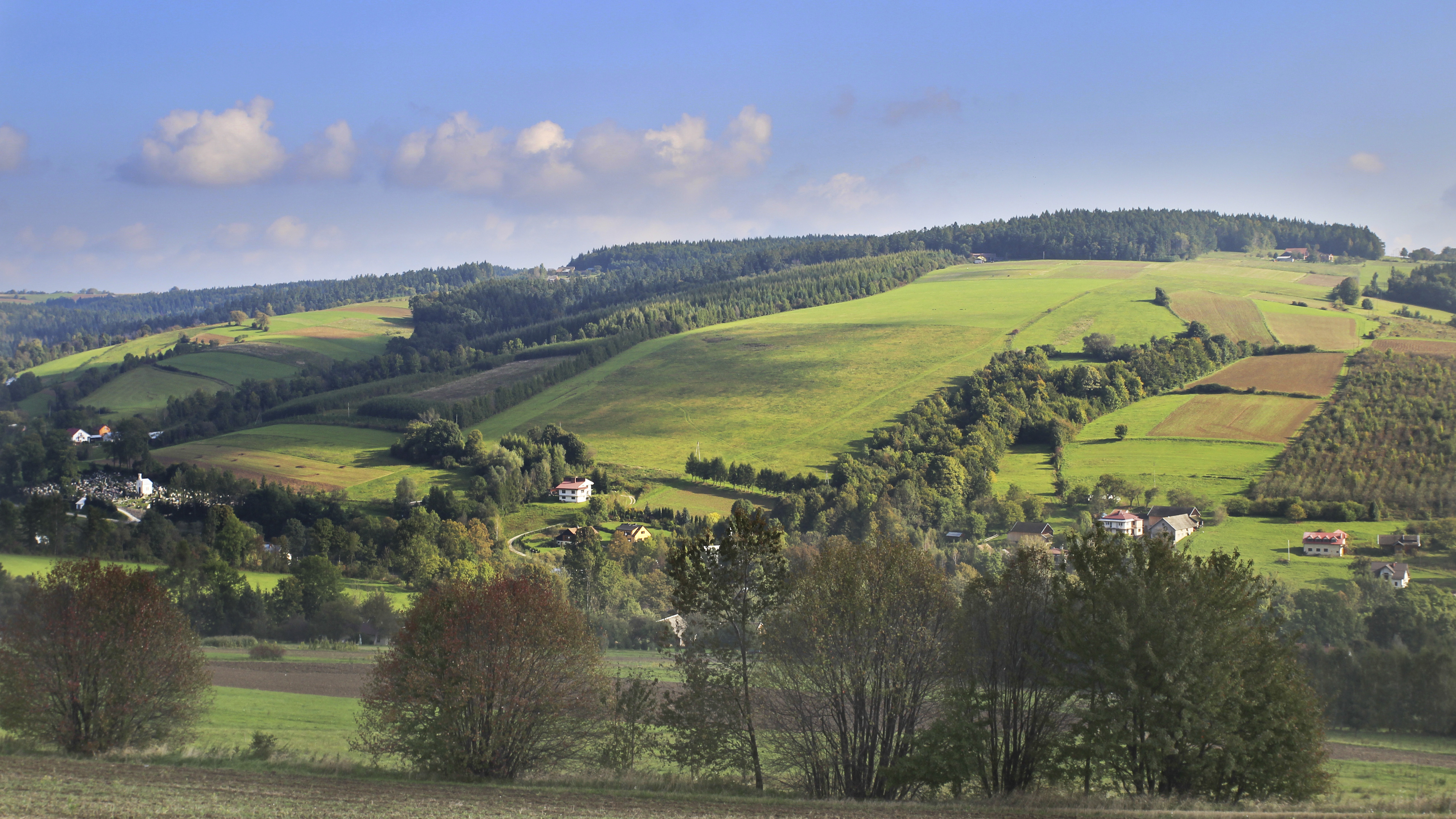
- View on Lipnica Wielka

- Location within Poland
- Coordinates: 49°29′N 19°37′E
- Country: Poland
- Voivodeship: Lesser Poland
- County: Nowy Targ
- Gmina: Lipnica Wielka
- Time zone: UTC+1 (CET)
  - Summer (DST): UTC+2 (CEST)
- Vehicle registration: KNT

Lipnica Wielka (Polish: [lipˈɲit͡sa ˈvjɛlka]; Hungarian: Alsólipnica) is a village in Nowy Targ County, Lesser Poland Voivodeship, in southern Poland, close to the border with Slovakia. It is the seat of the gmina (administrative district) called Gmina Lipnica Wielka.

The village lies in the drainage basin of the Black Sea (through Orava, Váh and Danube rivers), in the historical region of Orava (Polish: Orawa).

== History ==
The area became part of Poland in the 10th or early 11th century, and later it passed to Hungary. In 1880, the village had a predominantly Polish population of 2,828. It became again part of Poland following World War I. During World War II, from 1939 to 1945, it was occupied by the Slovak Republic.
