= Charwatynia =

- Settlement
- Location within Poland
- Coordinates: 54°34′14″N 18°3′52″E
- Country: Poland
- Voivodeship: Pomeranian
- County: Wejherowo
- Gmina: Luzino

Charwatynia [xarvaˈtɨɲa] is a settlement in the administrative district of Gmina Luzino, within Wejherowo County, Pomeranian Voivodeship, in northern Poland.

For details of the history of the region, see History of Pomerania.
