= Luzino =

Village in Kashubia

Luzino Lëzëno
- Village
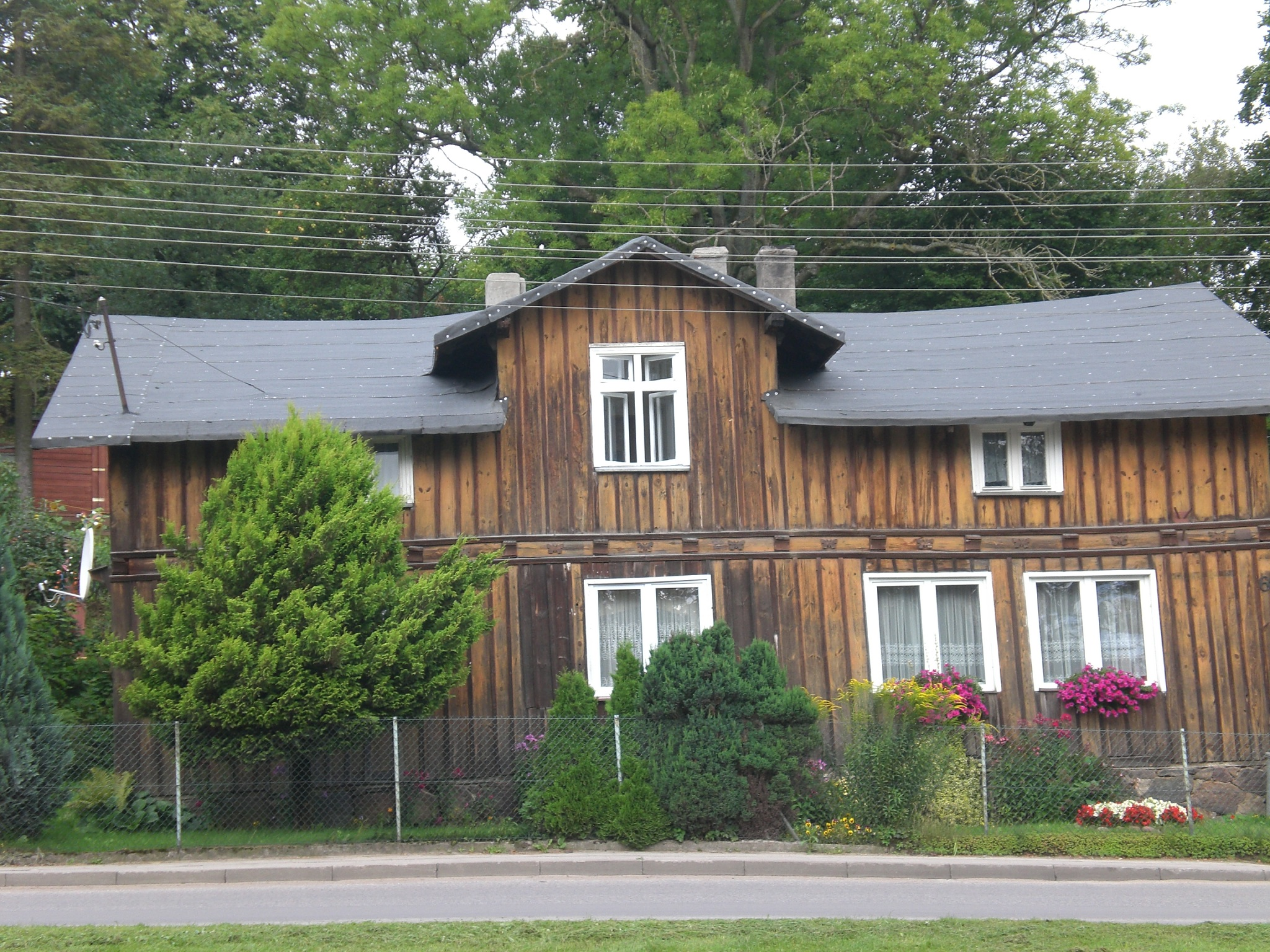

- Location within Poland
- Coordinates: 54°33′46″N 18°6′11″E
- Country: Poland
- Voivodeship: Pomeranian
- County: Wejherowo
- Gmina: Luzino
- Population: 6,985
- Time zone: UTC+1 (CET)
  - Summer (DST): UTC+2 (CEST)
- Vehicle registration: GWE
- Website: http://www.luzino.pl

Luzino [luˈʑinɔ] is a village in Wejherowo County, Pomeranian Voivodeship, in northern Poland. It is the seat of the gmina (administrative district) called Gmina Luzino. It is located in the ethnocultural region of Kashubia in the historic region of Pomerania.

== History ==
Luzino was a private church village of the monastery in Żukowo, administratively located in the Puck County in the Pomeranian Voivodeship of the Kingdom of Poland. It was annexed by Prussia in the First Partition of Poland in 1772. Following World War I, Poland regained independence and control of the village.

During the German occupation of Poland (World War II), the occupiers carried out executions of several Poles in the village, as part of the Intelligenzaktion. The local Polish school principal was murdered in November 1939 during the massacres in Piaśnica. In 1940, the occupiers also carried out expulsions of Poles, who were transported to a temporary transit camp in Kartuzy and then deported to the General Government in the more eastern part of German-occupied Poland, while their houses and farms were handed over to German colonists as part of the Lebensraum policy. In 1942, the Germans renamed the village to Freienau, and in 1943 to Lintzau. The German occupation ended in 1945, and the historic name was restored.
