= List of programmes broadcast by TVN =

The list consists of major formats that were or have been produced for TVN (Polish television channel) and aired as a premiere on this channel – unless otherwise stated.

== List of programmes ==
Ongoing shows (as of mid-2025) are in bold type.

=== News / Current affairs ===
- **Fakty** **(since 1995)**
- **Uwaga! (since 2002)**
- **Superwizjer (since 2001**, since 2017 also on TVN24)
- Kawa na ławę (2006–2010; later moved to TVN24)
- Kropka nad i (1997–2003; later moved to TVN24)
- Najsztub pyta (2004–2005)
- Teraz my! (2005–2010)

=== Morning shows ===
- **Dzień dobry TVN (since 2005)**
  - **Dzień Dobry Wakacje (since 2010)**

=== Talk shows ===
- Na językach (2013–2016)
- 36,6 °C (2017–2020)
- **Kuba Wojewódzki (since 2006**; previously on Polsat)
- Pod napięciem (1998–2006)
- Rozmowy w toku (2000–2016)
- Urzekła mnie twoja historia (2001)

=== Other ===
- **Autentyczni (since 2023) – based on The A Talks**
- **Co za tydzień (since 2001)**
- Efekt domina (2014–2021)
- **Kobieta na krańcu świata (2009–2021, since 2023)**
- **Maja w ogrodzie (since 2009)**
- Misja Martyna (2004–2005)
- Pascal: Po prostu gotuj! (2004–2009)
- Wybacz mi (2000)

=== TV Series ===
==== Drama ====
- 39 i pół (2008–2009)
  - 39 i pół tygodnia (2019)
- Brzydula (2008–2009) – based on Yo soy Betty, la fea
- Druga szansa (2016–2018)
- Julia (2011–2012; 10 additional miniepisodes and a 2-episode spin-off in 2013 on Player)
- Lekarze (2012–2014)
- Magda M. (2005–2007)
- Majka (2009–2010)
- Miasteczko (2000–2001)
- Mój agent (on TVN: 2023; preceded by a release on Player)
- Na noże (2016)
- **Na Wspólnej** **(since 2003) – based on Barátok közt**
- Prawo Agaty (2012–2015)
- Prosto w serce (2010–2011)
- Przepis na życie (2011–2013)
- Tajemnica zawodowa (2021–2022; series 2 originally released on Player)
- Teraz albo nigdy! (2008–2009)
- Usta usta (2010–2011, 2020–2022) – based on Cold Feet

==== Sitcoms ====
- Anioł Stróż (2005)
- Camera Café (2004) – based on Caméra Café
- Hela w opałach (2006–2007, 2010–2011) – based on Grace Under Fire
- Ja, Malinowski (1999)
- Kasia i Tomek (2002–2004) – based on Un gars, une fille
- Niania (2005–2009) – based on The Nanny
- Wszyscy kochają Romana (2011–2012) – based on Everybody Loves Raymond

==== Crime ====
- Behawiorysta (on TVN: 2023; preceded by a release on Player in 2022)
- Belle Epoque (2017)
- Chyłka (on TVN: 2019–2021, 2023; preceded by a release on Player)
- Kryminalni (2004–2008)
- Motyw (on TVN: 2020; preceded by a release on Player)
- Odwróceni (2007)
- Odwróceni. Ojcowie i córki (2019)
- Pati (on TVN: 2023; preceded by a release on Player) – Chyłka spin-off
- Pułapka (2018–2019)
- Szadź (on TVN: 2020–2021, 2023; preceded by a release on Player)
- Twarzą w twarz (2007–2008)
- Układ warszawski (2011)
- Żywioły Saszy. Ogień (on TVN: 2021; preceded by a release on Player)

==== Docu-soap ====
- Adopcje (2002–2003)
- Alfabet mafii (2004)
- Cela nr (1999–2001)
- Detektyw (2001–2006)
- Generał (2009)
- Granice (2004–2005)
- Jarmark Europa (2004)
- Katastrofy górnicze (2010)
- Kryminalne gry (2002–2003)
- Polska Jasienicy (2010)
- Supergliny (1998–2000)
- Szpieg (2008)
- Wielkie ucieczki (2006)
- Wracajcie, skąd przyszliście (2018)

==== Pseudo-documentary ====
- 19+ (2016–2019; later moved to TVN 7)
- **Detektywi (2005–2012, since 2023)**
- Sąd rodzinny (2008–2011) – based on Richter Alexander Hold
- Sędzia Anna Maria Wesołowska (2006–2011; later moved to TTV and Player) – based on Richter Alexander Hold
- Szkoła (2014–2019; later moved to TVN 7)
- Szpital (2013–2020)
- **Ukryta prawda (since 2012) – based on Familien im Brennpunkt**
- W11 – Wydział Śledczy (2004–2014) – based on K11 – Kommissare im Einsatz

==== Animation ====
- Kosmiczny wykop (2020)

=== Reality ===
==== Game/Quiz shows ====
- Chwila prawdy (2002–2004) – based on Happy Family Plan
- Dobra cena (1997–1998) – based on The Price Is Right
- Dzieciaki z klasą (2004–2005) – based on Britain's Brainest Kid
- Milion w minutę (2011–2012) – based on Minute to Win It
- Milionerzy (1999–2003, 2008–2010, 2017–2025; in 2025 moved to Polsat) – based on Who Wants to Be a Millionaire?
- Najsłabsze ogniwo (2004–2005) – based on The Weakest Link
- Oko za oko (2002) – based on Dog Eat Dog
- **The Floor (since 2025) – based on The Floor**

==== Talent shows ====
- Droga do gwiazd (2001–2002)
- Mali giganci (2015–2017) – based on Pequeños Gigantes
- **Mam talent! (2008–2019, 2021–2022, since 2024) – based on Got Talent**
- Mask Singer (2022) – based on The Masked Singer / King of Mask Singer
- Mini Playback Show (1997–1999)
- Taniec z gwiazdami (2005–2011; later moved to Polsat) – based on Dancing with the Stars
- X Factor (2011–2014) – based on The X Factor
- You Can Dance – Po prostu tańcz! (2007–2012, 2015–2016, 2025) – based on So You Think You Can Dance
- Zostań gwiazdą (1998–1999) – based on Soundmixshow

==== Competition, dating etc ====
- Agent / Agent – Gwiazdy (2000–2002, 2016–2019) – based on De Mol / The Mole
- Azja Express / Ameryka Express / **Afryka Express** **(2016–2018, 2020, since 2023) – based on Peking Express**
- Big Brother (2001–2002; later moved to TV4 and TVN 7) – based on Big Brother
- Ekspedycja (2001) – based on 71 Degrees North
- Hipnoza (2018) – based on You're Back in the Room
- Kawaler do wzięcia (2003) – based on The Bachelor
- **Lego Masters (since 2020) – based on Lego Masters**
- **MasterChef (since 2012) – based on MasterChef**
  - MasterChef Junior (2016–2023)
  - **MasterChef Nastolatki (since 2024)**
- Power Couple (2021) – based on זוג מנצח VIP (Power Couple)
- Project Runway (2014–2015) – based on Project Runway
- Projekt Lady (2016–2020; later moved to TVN7) – based on Ladette to Lady
- **The Traitors. Zdrajcy (since 2024) – based on The Traitors**
- Top Model. Zostań modelką / **Top Model** **(2010–2011, 2013–2016, since 2018) – based on Top Model**
- **Ugotowani** / Ugotowani w parach **(2010–2018, 2023, since 2025) – based on Come Dine with Me**
- Wipeout – Wymiatacze (2011) – based on Wipeout
- Wyprawa Robinson (2004) – based on Expedition Robinson (a Survivor format)

==== Other ====
- Ananasy z mojej klasy (2000–2002) – based on The Class Reunion
- Ciao Darwin (2004–2005) – based on Ciao Darwin
- Dla ciebie wszystko (2003–2004) – based on I'd Do Anything
- Iron Majdan (2018)
- Jestem jaki jestem (2003–2004)
- **Kuchenne rewolucje (since 2010) – based on Kitchen Nightmares**
- Mamy cię! (2004–2005, 2015) – based on Surprise Sur Prise
- Maraton uśmiechu (1997–2007)
- My Way (2019)
- Perfekcyjna pani domu (2012–2014) – based on Anthea Turner: Perfect Housewife
- Piekielny hotel (2015) – based on Hotel Hell
- Superniania (2006–2008) – based on Supernanny
- Surowi rodzice (2012–2014) – based on The World's Strictest Parents
- Szymon Majewski Show (2005–2011)
- Szymon na żywo (2012)
- **Ślub od pierwszego wejrzenia (2016–2018, since 2021; betweentimes moved to TVN 7 and brought back to TVN) – based on Married at First Sight**
- Totalne remonty Szelągowskiej (2020–2024)
- Usterka (2002–2004; later moved to TTV)
- Żony Hollywood (2015, 2017) – based on Hollywood Wives

== Schedule (Fall 2025) ==
=== Fall 2025 primetime schedule ===
PM	7:00	7:15	7:30	7:45	8:00	8:15	8:30	8:45	9:00	9:15	9:30	9:45	10:00	10:15	10:30
Monday	Fakty		sports news and weather forecast + Uwaga! + Doradca smaku			Na Wspólnej			The Floor		Bitwa o gości				
Tuesday	Fakty		sports news and weather forecast + Uwaga! + Doradca smaku			Na Wspólnej			The Floor		Ślub od pierwszego wejrzenia				
Wednesday	Fakty		sports news and weather forecast + Uwaga! + Doradca smaku			Na Wspólnej			The Floor		Top Model (to 11:10 pm)				
Thursday	Fakty		sports news and weather forecast + Uwaga! + Doradca smaku			Na Wspólnej			The Floor		Kuchenne rewolucje				
Friday	Fakty		sports news and weather forecast + Uwaga!		SUPERKINO (movies)										
Saturday	Fakty		sports news and weather forecast	Afryka Express								movies			
Sunday	Fakty		sports news and weather forecast	MasterChef							movies				

=== Fall 2025 access-primetime schedule ===
==== Weekdays ====
PM	3:45	4:00	4:15	4:30	4:45	5:00	5:15	5:30	5:45	6:00	6:15	6:30	6:45
Monday	Ukryta prawda				Szpital św. Anny					Detektywi			
Tuesday	Ukryta prawda				Szpital św. Anny					Detektywi			
Wednesday	Ukryta prawda				Szpital św. Anny					Detektywi			
Thursday	Ukryta prawda				Szpital św. Anny					Detektywi			
Friday	Ukryta prawda				Szpital św. Anny					Detektywi			

==== Weekends ====
PM	5:15	5:30	5:45	6:00	6:15	6:30	6:45
Saturday	Unboxing – Wielkie otwarcie (Oct.–)			Ugotowani			
Sunday	movies / reruns			Pogromcy chaosu			

=== Fall 2025 late night schedule ===
PM	10:45	11:00	11:15	11:30
Tuesday	Kuba Wojewódzki			

== Older schedules ==
=== Schedule (Spring 2025) ===
==== Spring 2025 primetime schedule ====
===== mid-February–March =====
PM	7:00	7:15	7:30	7:45	8:00	8:15	8:30	8:45	9:00	9:15	9:30	9:45	10:00	10:15	10:30	10:45
Monday	Fakty			Uwaga!	Doradca smaku	Na Wspólnej		MasterChef Nastolatki						movies		
Tuesday	Fakty			Uwaga!	Doradca smaku	Na Wspólnej		Kuba Wojewódzki					movies			
Wednesday	Fakty			Uwaga!	Doradca smaku	Na Wspólnej		You Can Dance – Po prostu tańcz!								movies
Thursday	Fakty			Uwaga!	Doradca smaku	Na Wspólnej		Kuchenne rewolucje					movies			
Friday	Fakty			Uwaga!	SUPERKINO (movies)											
Saturday	Fakty		Mam talent!							movies						
Sunday	Fakty		The Traitors. Zdrajcy							The Traitors. Arena		movies				

===== April–mid-May =====
PM	7:00	7:15	7:30	7:45	8:00	8:15	8:30	8:45	9:00	9:15	9:30	9:45	10:00	10:15	10:30	10:45
Monday	Fakty		sports news and weather forecastUwaga! Doradca smaku			Na Wspólnej		MasterChef Nastolatki / Zróbmy sobie dom						movies		
Tuesday	Fakty		sports news and weather forecastUwaga! Doradca smaku			Na Wspólnej		Kuba Wojewódzki					movies			
Wednesday	Fakty		sports news and weather forecastUwaga! Doradca smaku			Na Wspólnej		You Can Dance – Po prostu tańcz!								movies
Thursday	Fakty		sports news and weather forecastUwaga! Doradca smaku			Na Wspólnej		Kuchenne rewolucje					movies			
Friday	Fakty		sports news and weather forecastUwaga!		SUPERKINO (movies)											
Saturday	Fakty		sports news and weather forecast	Mam talent!							movies					
Sunday	Fakty		sports news and weather forecast	The Traitors. Zdrajcy							movies					

===== Mid-May–mid-June =====
PM	7:00	7:15	7:30	7:45	8:00	8:15	8:30	8:45	9:00	9:15	9:30	9:45	10:00	10:15	10:30	10:45
Monday	Fakty		sports news and weather forecastUwaga! Doradca smaku			Na Wspólnej			Zróbmy sobie dom				movies			
Tuesday	Fakty		sports news and weather forecastUwaga! Doradca smaku			Na Wspólnej			The Floor				movies			
Wednesday	Fakty		sports news and weather forecastUwaga! Doradca smaku			Na Wspólnej			The Floor				movies			
Thursday	Fakty		sports news and weather forecastUwaga! Doradca smaku			Na Wspólnej			The Floor				movies			
Friday	Fakty		sports news and weather forecastUwaga!		SUPERKINO (movies)											
Saturday	Fakty		sports news and weather forecast	Milionerzy			movies									
Sunday	Fakty		sports news and weather forecast	Milionerzy		Milionerzy			movies							

==== Spring 2025 access-primetime schedule ====
===== mid-February–March =====
PM	4:30	4:45	5:00	5:15	5:30	5:45	6:00	6:15	6:30	6:45
Monday	Detektywi					Szpital św. Anny				sports news and weather forecast
Tuesday	Detektywi					Szpital św. Anny				sports news and weather forecast
Wednesday	Detektywi					Szpital św. Anny				sports news and weather forecast
Thursday	Detektywi					Ukryta prawda				sports news and weather forecast
Friday	Detektywi					Ukryta prawda				sports news and weather forecast
Saturday	reruns / movies / ski jumping									sports news and weather forecast
Sunday	reruns / movies									sports news and weather forecast

===== April =====
PM	4:45	5:00	5:15	5:30	5:45	6:00	6:15	6:30	6:45
Monday	Detektywi					Szpital św. Anny			
Tuesday	Detektywi					Szpital św. Anny			
Wednesday	Detektywi					Szpital św. Anny			
Thursday	Detektywi					Ukryta prawda			
Friday	Detektywi					Ukryta prawda			
Saturday	reruns / movies								
Sunday	reruns / movies								

=== Schedule (Fall 2024) ===
==== Fall 2024 primetime schedule ====
PM	7:00	7:15	7:30	7:45	8:00	8:15	8:30	8:45	9:00	9:15	9:30	9:45	10:00	10:15	10:30	10:45
Monday	Fakty			Uwaga!	Doradca smaku	Na Wspólnej		B&B Love (Sep.–Oct.) Milionerzy (Nov.–Dec.)			Totalne remonty Szelągowskiej				movies	
Tuesday	Fakty			Uwaga!	Doradca smaku	Na Wspólnej		B&B Love (Sep.–Oct.) Milionerzy (Nov.–Dec.)			Ślub od pierwszego wejrzenia				see below	
Wednesday	Fakty			Uwaga!	Doradca smaku	Na Wspólnej		B&B Love (Sep.–Oct.) Milionerzy (Nov.–Dec.)			Top Model					
Thursday	Fakty			Uwaga!	Doradca smaku	Na Wspólnej		B&B Love (Sep.–Oct.) Milionerzy (Nov.–Dec.)			Kuchenne rewolucje				movies	
Friday	Fakty			Uwaga!	SUPERKINO (movies)											
Saturday	Fakty		Azja Express							movies						
Sunday	Fakty		MasterChef							movies						

==== Fall 2024 access-primetime schedule ====
PM	4:30	4:45	5:00	5:15	5:30	5:45	6:00	6:15	6:30	6:45
Monday	Ukryta prawda					Detektywi				sports news and weather forecast
Tuesday	Ukryta prawda					Detektywi				sports news and weather forecast
Wednesday	Ukryta prawda					Detektywi				sports news and weather forecast
Thursday	Ukryta prawda					Detektywi				sports news and weather forecast
Friday	Ukryta prawda					Detektywi				sports news and weather forecast
Saturday	reruns									sports news and weather forecast
Sunday	reruns									sports news and weather forecast

==== Fall 2024 late night schedule ====
PM	10:30	10:45	11:00	11:15	11:30	11:45	12:00 am
Tuesday	Kuba Wojewódzki					Superwizjer	

=== Schedule (Spring 2024) ===
==== Primetime schedule ====
PM	7:00	7:15	7:30	7:45	8:00	8:15	8:30	8:45	9:00	9:15	9:30	9:45	10:00	10:15	10:30	10:45
Monday	Fakty			sports news and weather forecast and Uwaga! and Doradca smaku		Na Wspólnej			Milionerzy		Skazana					movies
Tuesday	Fakty			sports news and weather forecast and Uwaga! and Doradca smaku		Na Wspólnej			Milionerzy		Pokonaj mnie, jeśli potrafisz					movies
Wednesday	Fakty			sports news and weather forecast and Uwaga! and Doradca smaku		Na Wspólnej			Milionerzy		The Traitors. Zdrajcy					
Thursday	Fakty			sports news and weather forecast and Uwaga! and Doradca smaku		Na Wspólnej			Milionerzy		Kuchenne rewolucje					movies
Friday	Fakty		sports news and weather forecast	Uwaga!	SUPERKINO (movies)											
Saturday	Fakty		sports news and weather forecast	Uwaga!	Mam talent!									movies		
Sunday	Fakty		sports news and weather forecast	Uwaga!	MasterChef Nastolatki						movies					

==== Access-primetime schedule ====
PM	5:00	5:15	5:30	5:45	6:00	6:15	6:30	6:45
Monday	Ukryta prawda				Detektywi			
Tuesday	Ukryta prawda				Detektywi			
Wednesday	Ukryta prawda				Detektywi			
Thursday	Ukryta prawda				Detektywi			
Friday	Ukryta prawda				Detektywi			

==== Late night schedule ====
PM	10:45	11:00	11:15	11:30	11:45	12:00 am
Tuesday	Kuba Wojewódzki				Superwizjer	

=== Schedule (Fall 2023) ===
==== Primetime schedule ====
PM	7:00	7:15	7:30	7:45	8:00	8:15	8:30	8:45	9:00	9:15	9:30	9:45	10:00	10:15	10:30
Monday	Fakty			sports news and weather forecast and Uwaga! and Doradca smaku		Na Wspólnej			Milionerzy		Pati (–) / Behawiorysta (–)				
Tuesday	Fakty			sports news and weather forecast and Uwaga! and Doradca smaku		Na Wspólnej			Milionerzy		Ślub od pierwszego wejrzenia				
Wednesday	Fakty			sports news and weather forecast and Uwaga! and Doradca smaku		Na Wspólnej			Milionerzy		Totalne remonty Szelągowskiej				
Thursday	Fakty			sports news and weather forecast and Uwaga! and Doradca smaku		Na Wspólnej			Milionerzy		Kuchenne rewolucje				
Friday	Fakty		sports news and weather forecast	Uwaga!	SUPERKINO (movies)										
Saturday	Fakty		sports news and weather forecast	Uwaga!	Top Model						movies				
Sunday	Fakty		sports news and weather forecast	Uwaga!	MasterChef						Szadź (–) / movies (–)				

==== Access-primetime schedule ====
PM	4:45	5:00	5:15	5:30	5:45	6:00	6:15	6:30	6:45
Monday	Detektywi					Ukryta prawda			
Tuesday	Detektywi					Ukryta prawda			
Wednesday	Detektywi					Ukryta prawda			
Thursday	Zapisane w gwiazdach () / Detektywi (–)					Ukryta prawda			
Friday	Zapisane w gwiazdach					Ukryta prawda			

==== Late night schedule ====
PM	10:45	11:00	11:15	11:30	11:45	12:00 am
Tuesday	Kuba Wojewódzki				Superwizjer	

=== Schedule (Spring 2023) ===
==== Primetime schedule ====
PM	7:00	7:15	7:30	7:45	8:00	8:15	8:30	8:45	9:00	9:15	9:30	9:45	10:00	10:15	10:30
Monday	Fakty			sports news and weather forecast and Uwaga! and Doradca smaku		Na Wspólnej			Milionerzy		Skazana				
Tuesday	Fakty			sports news and weather forecast and Uwaga! and Doradca smaku		Na Wspólnej			Milionerzy		Nastolatki rządzą… kasą				
Wednesday	Fakty			sports news and weather forecast and Uwaga! and Doradca smaku		Na Wspólnej			Milionerzy		Ugotowani w parach				
Thursday	Fakty			sports news and weather forecast and Uwaga! and Doradca smaku		Na Wspólnej			Milionerzy		Kuchenne rewolucje				
Friday	Fakty		sports news and weather forecast	Uwaga!	SUPERKINO (movies)										
Saturday	Fakty		sports news and weather forecast	Uwaga!	Azja Express						movies				
Sunday	Fakty		sports news and weather forecast	Uwaga!	MasterChef						Mój agent				

==== Access-primetime schedule ====
PM	4:15	4:30	4:45	5:00	5:15	5:30	5:45	6:00	6:15	6:30	6:45
Monday	Kto to wie?			Sekrety życia				Ukryta prawda			
Tuesday	Kto to wie?			Sekrety życia				Ukryta prawda			
Wednesday	Kto to wie?			Sekrety życia				Ukryta prawda			
Thursday	Kto to wie?			Sekrety życia				Ukryta prawda			
Friday	Kto to wie?			Sekrety życia				Ukryta prawda			

==== Late night schedule ====
PM	10:45	11:00	11:15	11:30
Tuesday	Kuba Wojewódzki			
Sunday	Superwizjer		movies	

=== Schedule (Fall 2019) ===
==== Primetime and late night schedule ====
PM	8:00	8:15	8:30	8:45	9:00	9:15	9:30	9:45	10:00	10:15	10:30	10:45	11:00	11:15	11:30	11:45
Monday	Uwaga!	Na Wspólnej			Milionerzy		Top Model						movie			
Tuesday	Uwaga!	Na Wspólnej			Milionerzy		Pułapka				Kuba Wojewódzki				Superwizjer	
Wednesday	Uwaga!	Na Wspólnej			Milionerzy		Starsza pani musi fiknąć				movie					
Thursday	Uwaga!	Na Wspólnej			Milionerzy		Kuchenne rewolucje				movie					
Friday	SUPERKINO (movies)															
Saturday	Mam talent!								movie							
Sunday	MasterChef						39,5 tygodnia				movie					

==== Early fringe schedule ====
PM	3:30	3:45	4:00	4:15	4:30	4:45	5:00	5:15	5:30	5:45	6:00	6:15	6:30	6:45	7:00	7:15	7:30	7:45
Monday	Szkoła				19+		Ukryta prawda				Szpital				Fakty		sports news and weather forecast	Uwaga!
Tuesday	Szkoła				19+		Ukryta prawda				Szpital				Fakty		sports news and weather forecast	Uwaga!
Wednesday	Szkoła				19+		Ukryta prawda				Szpital				Fakty		sports news and weather forecast	Uwaga!
Thursday	Szkoła				19+		Ukryta prawda				Szpital				Fakty		sports news and weather forecast	Uwaga!
Friday	Szkoła				19+		Ukryta prawda				Szpital				Fakty		sports news and weather forecast	Uwaga!
Saturday	replays										36,6 °C				Fakty		sports news and weather forecast	Uwaga!
Sunday	movie						Big Brother Tydzień				replays				Fakty		sports news and weather forecast	Uwaga!

=== Schedule (Spring 2019) ===
==== Primetime schedule ====
PM	7:00	7:15	7:30	7:45	8:00	8:15	8:30	8:45	9:00	9:15	9:30	9:45	10:00	10:15
Monday	Fakty		sports news and weather forecast	Uwaga!	Uwaga! and Doradca smaku	Na Wspólnej			Milionerzy		movie			
Tuesday	Fakty		sports news and weather forecast	Uwaga!	Uwaga! and Doradca smaku	Na Wspólnej			Milionerzy		Diagnoza			
Wednesday	Fakty		sports news and weather forecast	Uwaga!	Uwaga! and Doradca smaku	Na Wspólnej			Milionerzy		Agent – Gwiazdy			
Thursday	Fakty		sports news and weather forecast	Uwaga!	Uwaga! and Doradca smaku	Na Wspólnej			Milionerzy		Kuchenne rewolucje			
Friday	Fakty		sports news and weather forecast	Uwaga!	SUPERKINO (movies)									
Saturday	Fakty		sports news and weather forecast	Uwaga!	Chyłka				movie					
Sunday	Fakty		sports news and weather forecast	Uwaga!	MasterChef Junior						Szóstka			

==== Early fringe schedule ====
PM	3:30	3:45	4:00	4:15	4:30	4:45	5:00	5:15	5:30	5:45	6:00	6:15	6:30	6:45
Monday	Szkoła				19+		Szpital				Ukryta prawda			
Tuesday	Szkoła				19+		Szpital				Ukryta prawda			
Wednesday	Szkoła				19+		Szpital				Ukryta prawda			
Thursday	Szkoła				19+		Szpital				Ukryta prawda			
Friday	Szkoła				19+		Szpital				Ukryta prawda			
Saturday	replays										36,6 °C			
Sunday	movie						Big Brother Tydzień				replays			

==== Late night schedule ====
PM	10:30	10:45	11:00	11:15	11:30	11:45
Tuesday	Kuba Wojewódzki				Superwizjer	

=== Schedule (Fall 2018) ===
==== Primetime schedule ====
PM	8:00	8:15	8:30	8:45	9:00	9:15	9:30	9:45	10:00	10:15	10:30	10:45	11:00	11:15
Monday	Uwaga!	Na Wspólnej			Milionerzy		Top Model				Ślub od pierwszego wejrzenia			
Tuesday	Uwaga!	Na Wspólnej			Milionerzy		Diagnoza				Kuba Wojewódzki			
Wednesday	Uwaga!	Na Wspólnej			Milionerzy		Ameryka Express						movie	
Thursday	Uwaga!	Na Wspólnej			Milionerzy		Kuchenne rewolucje				movie			
Friday	SUPERKINO (movies)													
Saturday	Mam talent!								movie					
Sunday	MasterChef						Pułapka / Pod powierzchnią				movie			

==== Early fringe schedule ====
PM	3:30	3:45	4:00	4:15	4:30	4:45	5:00	5:15	5:30	5:45	6:00	6:15	6:30	6:45	7:00	7:15	7:30	7:45
Monday	Szkoła				19+		Ukryta prawda				Szpital				Fakty		sports news and weather forecast	Uwaga!
Tuesday	Szkoła				19+		Ukryta prawda				Szpital				Fakty		sports news and weather forecast	Uwaga!
Wednesday	Szkoła				19+		Ukryta prawda				Szpital				Fakty		sports news and weather forecast	Uwaga!
Thursday	Szkoła				19+		Ukryta prawda				Szpital				Fakty		sports news and weather forecast	Uwaga!
Friday	Szkoła				19+		Ukryta prawda				Szpital				Fakty		sports news and weather forecast	Uwaga!
Saturday	repeats										36,6 °C				Fakty		sports news and weather forecast	Uwaga!
Sunday	movie / repeats										Domowe rewolucje				Fakty		sports news and weather forecast	Uwaga!

=== Schedule (Spring 2018) ===
==== Primetime schedule ====
PM	8:00	8:15	8:30	8:45	9:00	9:15	9:30	9:45	10:00	10:15	10:30	10:45	11:00	11:15
Monday	Uwaga!	Na Wspólnej			Milionerzy		Druga szansa				Iron Majdan			
Tuesday	Uwaga!	Na Wspólnej			Milionerzy		Diagnoza				Kuba Wojewódzki			
Wednesday	Uwaga!	Na Wspólnej			Milionerzy		Agent – Gwiazdy				movie			
Thursday	Uwaga!	Na Wspólnej			Milionerzy		Kuchenne rewolucje				movie			
Friday	SUPERKINO (movie)								SUPERKINO (movie)					
Saturday	Hipnoza				movie								movie	
Sunday	MasterChef Junior						movie							

==== Early fringe schedule ====
PM	5:00	5:15	5:30	5:45	6:00	6:15	6:30	6:45	7:00	7:15	7:30	7:45
Monday	Ukryta prawda				Szpital				Fakty		sports news and weather forecast	Uwaga!
Tuesday	Ukryta prawda				Szpital				Fakty		sports news and weather forecast	Uwaga!
Wednesday	Ukryta prawda				Szpital				Fakty		sports news and weather forecast	Uwaga!
Thursday	Ukryta prawda				Szpital				Fakty		sports news and weather forecast	Uwaga!
Friday	Ukryta prawda				Szpital				Fakty		sports news and weather forecast	Uwaga!
Saturday	Kuchenne rewolucje (R)				36,6 °C				Fakty		sports news and weather forecast	Uwaga!
Sunday	movie				Ugotowani				Fakty		sports news and weather forecast	Uwaga!

=== Schedule (Fall 2017) ===
==== Primetime schedule ====
PM	8:00	8:15	8:30	8:45	9:00	9:15	9:30	9:45	10:00	10:15	10:30	10:45	11:00	11:15
Monday	Uwaga!	Na Wspólnej			Milionerzy		Druga szansa				Ślub od pierwszego wejrzenia			
Tuesday	Uwaga!	Na Wspólnej			Milionerzy		Diagnoza				Kuba Wojewódzki			
Wednesday	Uwaga!	Na Wspólnej			Milionerzy		Azja Express						movie	
Thursday	Uwaga!	Na Wspólnej			Milionerzy		Kuchenne rewolucje				movie			
Friday	SUPERKINO (movie)								movie					
Saturday	Mam talent!								movie					
Sunday	MasterChef						movie							

==== Early fringe schedule ====
PM	5:00	5:15	5:30	5:45	6:00	6:15	6:30	6:45	7:00	7:15	7:30	7:45
Monday	Ukryta prawda				Szpital				Fakty		sports news and weather forecast	Uwaga!
Tuesday	Ukryta prawda				Szpital				Fakty		sports news and weather forecast	Uwaga!
Wednesday	Ukryta prawda				Szpital				Fakty		sports news and weather forecast	Uwaga!
Thursday	Ukryta prawda				Szpital				Fakty		sports news and weather forecast	Uwaga!
Friday	Ukryta prawda				Szpital				Fakty		sports news and weather forecast	Uwaga!
Saturday	replays				36,6 °C				Fakty		sports news and weather forecast	Uwaga!
Sunday	replays				Drzewo marzeń				Fakty		sports news and weather forecast	Uwaga!

=== Schedule (Spring 2017) ===
==== Primetime schedule ====
PM	8:00	8:15	8:30	8:45	9:00	9:15	9:30	9:45	10:00	10:15	10:30	10:45	11:00	11:15
Monday	Uwaga!	Na Wspólnej			Milionerzy		Druga szansa				Żony Hollywood			
Tuesday	Uwaga!	Na Wspólnej			Milionerzy		Agent - Gwiazdy				Kuba Wojewódzki			
Wednesday	Uwaga!	Na Wspólnej			Milionerzy		Belle Epoque				movie			
Thursday	Uwaga!	Na Wspólnej			Milionerzy		Kuchenne rewolucje				movie			
Friday	SUPERKINO (movie)								SUPERKINO (movie)					
Saturday	movie								movie					
Sunday	MasterChef Junior						movie							

==== Early fringe schedule ====
PM	5:00	5:15	5:30	5:45	6:00	6:15	6:30	6:45	7:00	7:15	7:30	7:45
Monday	Ukryta prawda				Szpital				Fakty TVN		sports news and weather forecast	Uwaga!
Tuesday	Ukryta prawda				Szpital				Fakty TVN		sports news and weather forecast	Uwaga!
Wednesday	Ukryta prawda				Szpital				Fakty TVN		sports news and weather forecast	Uwaga!
Thursday	Ukryta prawda				Szpital				Fakty TVN		sports news and weather forecast	Uwaga!
Friday	Ukryta prawda				Szpital				Fakty TVN		sports news and weather forecast	Uwaga!
Saturday	Kuchenne rewolucje (R)				36,6 °C				Fakty TVN		sports news and weather forecast	Uwaga!
Sunday	Belle Epoque (R)				Ugotowani				Fakty TVN		sports news and weather forecast	Uwaga!

=== Schedule (Fall 2016) ===
==== Primetime schedule ====
PM	8:00	8:15	8:30	8:45	9:00	9:15	9:30	9:45	10:00	10:15	10:30	10:45	11:00	11:15
Monday	Uwaga!	Na Wspólnej			Singielka		Druga szansa				movie			
Tuesday	Uwaga!	Na Wspólnej			Singielka		Top Model				Kuba Wojewódzki			
Wednesday	Uwaga!	Na Wspólnej			Singielka		Azja Express				movie			
Thursday	Uwaga!	Na Wspólnej			Singielka		Kuchenne rewolucje				movie			
Friday	SUPERKINO (movie)								SUPERKINO (movie)					
Saturday	Mam talent!								movie					
Sunday	MasterChef						Na noże				movie			

==== Early fringe schedule ====
PM	5:00	5:15	5:30	5:45	6:00	6:15	6:30	6:45	7:00	7:15	7:30	7:45
Monday	Ukryta prawda				Szpital				Fakty TVN		sports news and weather forecast	Uwaga!
Tuesday	Ukryta prawda				Szpital				Fakty TVN		sports news and weather forecast	Uwaga!
Wednesday	Ukryta prawda				Szpital				Fakty TVN		sports news and weather forecast	Uwaga!
Thursday	Ukryta prawda				Szpital				Fakty TVN		sports news and weather forecast	Uwaga!
Friday	Ukryta prawda				Szpital				Fakty TVN		sports news and weather forecast	Uwaga!
Saturday	Masterchef (R)				Kuchenne rewolucje (R)				Fakty TVN		sports news and weather forecast	Uwaga!
Sunday	movie				Ugotowani				Fakty TVN		sports news and weather forecast	Uwaga!

=== Schedule (Spring 2016) ===
==== Primetime schedule ====
PM	8:00	8:15	8:30	8:45	9:00	9:15	9:30	9:45	10:00	10:15	10:30	10:45	11:00	11:15
Monday	Na Wspólnej			Singielka			Druga szansa				Na językach			
Tuesday	Na Wspólnej			Singielka			Agent – gwiazdy				Kuba Wojewódzki			
Wednesday	Na Wspólnej			Singielka			You Can Dance: Po prostu tańcz!				movie			
Thursday	Na Wspólnej			Singielka			Kuchenne rewolucje				movie			
Friday	SUPERKINO (movie)								SUPERKINO (movie)					
Saturday	Mali giganci								movie					
Sunday	MasterChef Junior						movie							

==== Early fringe schedule ====
PM	5:00	5:15	5:30	5:45	6:00	6:15	6:30	6:45	7:00	7:15	7:30	7:45
Monday	Ukryta prawda				Szpital				Fakty TVN		sports news and weather forecast	Uwaga!
Tuesday	Ukryta prawda				Szpital				Fakty TVN		sports news and weather forecast	Uwaga!
Wednesday	Ukryta prawda				Szpital				Fakty TVN		sports news and weather forecast	Uwaga!
Thursday	Ukryta prawda				Szpital				Fakty TVN		sports news and weather forecast	Uwaga!
Friday	Ukryta prawda				Szpital				Fakty TVN		sports news and weather forecast	Uwaga!
Saturday	MasterChef Junior (R)				Kuchenne rewolucje (R)				Fakty TVN		sports news and weather forecast	Uwaga!
Sunday	movie		Sablewskiej sposób na...		Ugotowani				Fakty TVN		sports news and weather forecast	Uwaga!

=== Schedule (Fall 2015) ===
==== Primetime schedule ====
PM	8:00	8:15	8:30	8:45	9:00	9:15	9:30	9:45	10:00	10:15	10:30	10:45	11:00	11:15
Monday	Na Wspólnej			Ten moment			Top Model				Na językach			
Tuesday	Na Wspólnej			Ten moment			Aż po sufit!				Kuba Wojewódzki			
Wednesday	Na Wspólnej			Kto poślubi mojego syna?				Żony Hollywood				movie		
Thursday	Na Wspólnej			Kuchenne rewolucje				movie						
Friday	SUPERKINO (movie)								SUPERKINO (movie)					
Saturday	Mam talent!								movie					
Sunday	Aplauz, Aplauz!						MasterChef						movie	

==== Early fringe schedule ====
PM	5:00	5:15	5:30	5:45	6:00	6:15	6:30	6:45	7:00	7:15	7:30	7:45
Monday	Ukryta prawda		Singielka		Szpital				Fakty TVN		sports news and weather forecast	Uwaga!
Tuesday	Ukryta prawda		Singielka		Szpital				Fakty TVN		sports news and weather forecast	Uwaga!
Wednesday	Ukryta prawda		Singielka		Szpital				Fakty TVN		sports news and weather forecast	Uwaga!
Thursday	Ukryta prawda		Singielka		Szpital				Fakty TVN		sports news and weather forecast	Uwaga!
Friday	Ukryta prawda		Singielka		Szpital				Fakty TVN		sports news and weather forecast	Uwaga!
Saturday	Top Model (R)				Kuchenne rewolucje (R)				Fakty TVN		sports news and weather forecast	Uwaga!
Sunday	movie				Ugotowani				Fakty TVN		sports news and weather forecast	Uwaga!

== Feature films and TV movies ==
- Bokser (The Fighter) – 2012
- Cisza (Silence) – 2010
- Generał – zamach na Gibraltarze (The General – The Gibraltar Assassination) – 2009
- Heniek (Henry)
- Kochaj i tańcz (Love and Dance) – 2009
- Krzysztof (Christopher) – 2010
- Laura (Laura) – 2010
- Listy do M. (Letters to Santa) – 2011
- Listy do M. 2 (Letters to Santa 2) – 2015
- Listy do M. 3 (Letters to Santa 3) – 2017
- Los Numeros (Los Numeros) – 2011
- Mój biegun (My Pole) – 2013
- Mój rower (My Father's Bike) – 2012
- Nad życie (Agata – Lose to Win) – 2012
- Obce niebo (Strange Heaven)
- Oszukane (Deceived) – 2012
- Podatek od miłości – 2017/2018
- Świadek koronny (The State Witness) – 2007
