= Michał Piróg =

Polish dancer, choreographer

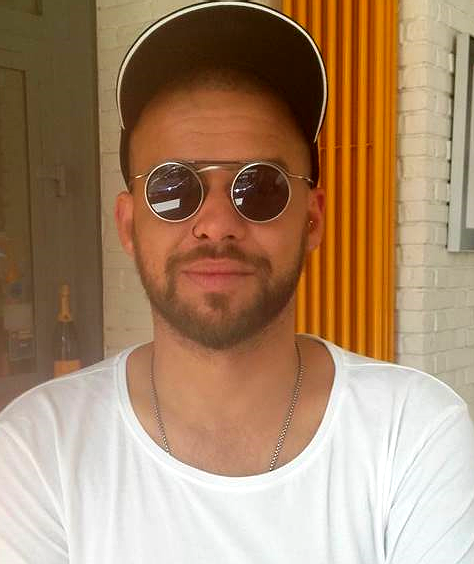
- Piróg in 2016
- Born: May 28, 1979 (age 46); Kielce, Poland
- Occupations: dancer, choreographer, actor, TV presenter

Michał Paweł Piróg (born 28 May 1979, Kielce) is a Polish dancer, choreographer, TV presenter, actor and television personality.

== Life and career ==
He graduated from the Cyprian Norwid High School No. 3 in Kielce and studied philosophy at the Jagiellonian University in Kraków. He is a self-taught dancer. At the age of 19, he started to work as a dancer at the Kielce Dance Theatre. He appeared in numerous theatre and television productions including Piotr Galiński's ballet performance Być albo brać ("To Be or To Take"), John Kander's Chicago at the Komedia Theatre in Warsaw, Andrew Lloyd Webber's Cats at the Roma Music Theatre in Warsaw, Ballady morderców ("Murder Ballads") at the Bajka Kinoteatr as well as Neil LaBute's play Fat Pig at the Powszechny Theatre in Warsaw.

He worked as a dancer and choreographer in the Droga do gwiazd TV program broadcast on TVN Channel. In 2006, he co-hosted, alongside Edyta Herbuś, the W rytmie MTV programme. In 2007, he became one of the judges on the You Can Dance: Po prostu tańcz! talent show. In the same year, he appeared in Polish rock band Ira's music video to the song Trochę wolniej. In 2008, he co-hosted, together with Joanna Liszowska and Rafał Maserak, the Twój prywatny instruktor tańca show ("Your Private Dance Teacher"). In 2010, he started to work as a host in Poland's edition of the Top Model television series, initially aired on TVN Style. He has collaborated with singer Andrzej Piaseczny and Plastic music band and worked on choreography to their music videos.

He also works as a dance instructor at the Autorska Szkoła Musicalowa in Olsztyn and organizes numerous dance and acting workshops across Poland. As a professional dancer he specializes in jazz, modern jazz, afro jazz, modern dance, funky jazz and broadway jazz and has collaborated with a number of theatres in Poland, France, Belgium and Switzerland.

He established a two-year dancing project Horn Dance Company in partnership with Joanna Wasiuk. In 2017, he appeared alongside Piotr Czaykowski, on TVN's reality show Asia Express.

== Personal life ==
He is gay. He is Jewish from his mother's side and has an older brother Sebastian. He is a member of the Jewish Religious Community of Warsaw.

== Filmography ==
- 2009: Zamiana as Joni
- 2014: Wkręceni 2 as juror
- 2016: Druga szansa as himself
- 2016-2017: Wmiksowani.pl as Zibi Dól
- 2017: Drunk History - Pół litra historii as narrator
