= Pride and Modernity =

Neo-Nazi organisation in Poland

- Duma i Nowoczesność
- Logo of the Pride and Modernity
- Established: 19 September 2011; 15 years ago
- Dissolved: August 2019; 7 years ago
- Type: Charity
- Headquarters: Wodzisław Śląski
- Location: Silesian Voivodeship
- Leader: Mateusz S.
- Deputy leader: Jacek Lanuszy
- Publication: Blue Eyes
- Website: din.org.pl
- KRS №: 0000400463

Pride and Modernity (Polish: Duma i Nowoczesność; DiN) was a Polish neo-Nazi organisation that was banned by the public prosecutor's office in 2019 for promoting fascism, after some of its members were filmed celebrating the birth of Adolf Hitler.

== Foundation ==
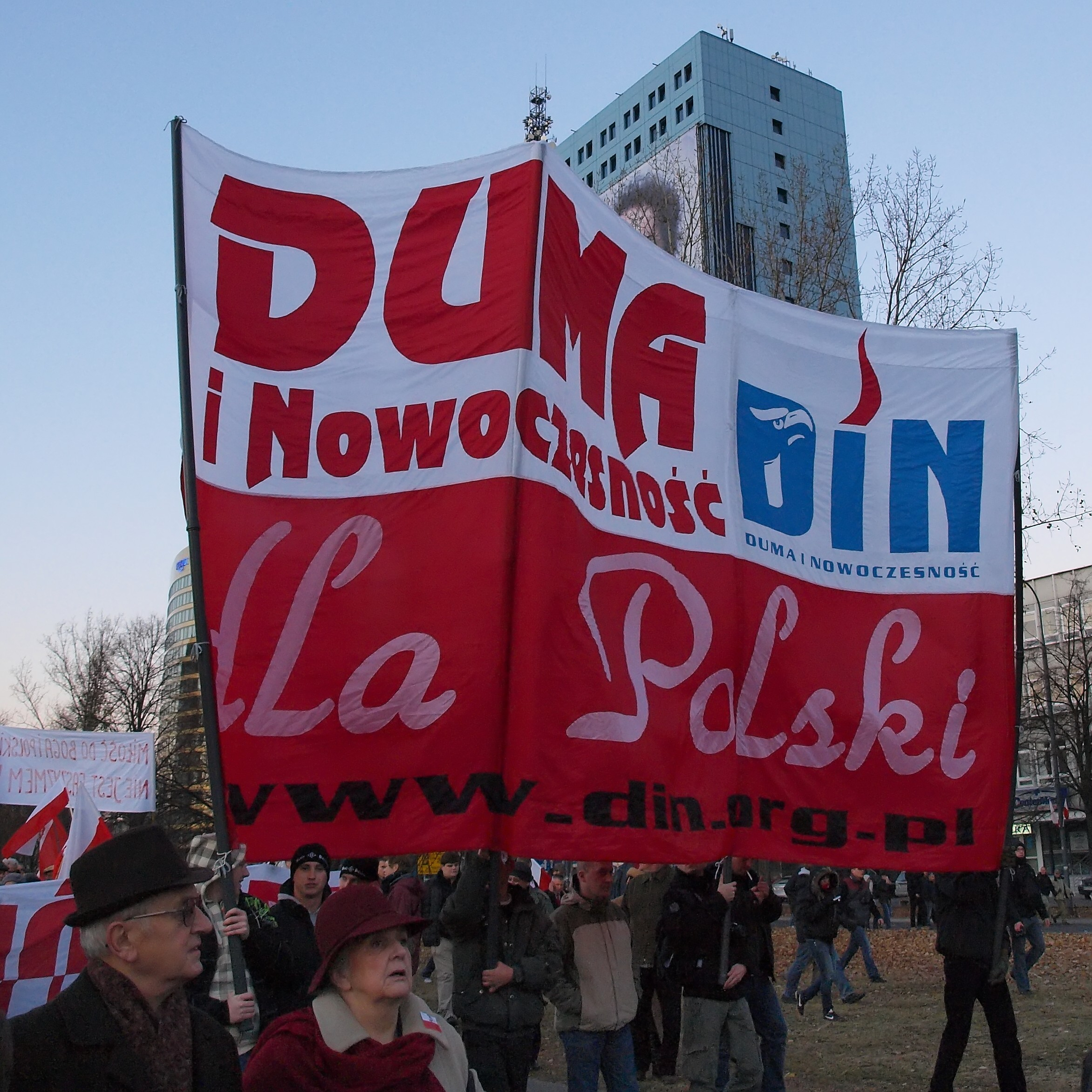
DiN supporters on the Independence March, 2011

The group was founded on 19 September 2011, with the stated aim of pursuing charitable work, which included campaigning against the so-called genocide of Afrikaners.

== Dissolution ==
=== Hitler's birthday incident ===
In 2017 DiN's leader, known as Mateusz S. due to Polish privacy laws, organised a party celebration on the occasion of the 128th anniversary of Hitler's birthday. Attended by 11 other members of DiN, the party involved Nazi symbols including the swastika and attendees dressing up in the uniforms of the Schutzstaffel and Wehrmacht. The event was secretly filmed by a journalist conducting an undercover investigation for TVN. In 2018 the footage of the birthday party was aired as part of a documentary titled Polscy neonaziści on TVN's Superwizjer show.

The DiN's deputy leader Jacek Lanuszy, who at the time worked in the Sejm for Robert Winnicki, initially dismissed the incident before attempting to distance his group from the event. However, the documentary brought widespread condemnation of DiN from across the political spectrum. The Prime Minister Mateusz Morawiecki made a statement about the documentary on social media, while his interior minister Joachim Brudzinski also spoke out against the group.

Following the airing of the documentary, the Internal Security Agency arrested the attendees of the event. House searches uncovered Nazi propaganda at the residences of those detained. In June 2022, six of those arrested were convicted of promoting fascism under article 256 and given suspended prison sentences of between 3-16 months. In 2024, the defendants appealed, but their sentences were upheld by the court. The TVN documentary also contained footage of DiN members performing Nazi salutes at a festival they organised called Eagle's Nest (Orle Gniazdo) held in Tychy. On behalf of the Modern party, Adam Szłapka called for the local mayor Andrzej Dziuba to submit a request for an investigation into the activities of the Eagle's Nest Foundation too.

=== Aftermath ===
The public outcry over the TVN documentary led to DiN being legally dissolved in 2019 for propagating Nazism by the public prosecutor's office in Gliwice, on the request of the starost of Wodzisław Śląski. The court based its decision on the evidence that the DiN were aware of the party in honour of Hitler, which had been organised by Mateusz S., the leader of DiN, and that eleven members of the organisation were also in attendance. The argument by representatives of DiN that it had not been involved in organising the birthday party or the Eagle's Nest festival was dismissed.
