= Azja Express =

- Genre: Reality
- Presented by: Agnieszka Woźniak-Starak (series 1–3); Daria Ładocha (series 4–6); Izabella Krzan (series 7–)
- Country of origin: Poland
- Original language: Polish
- No. of seasons: 6
- No. of episodes: 65

Production
- Producers: Eccholine, TVN
- Production locations: Asia: Cambodia, Laos, Thailand, Vietnam, Sri Lanka, India, Turkey, Georgia, Uzbekistan South and Central America: Ecuador, Peru, Colombia, Guatemala

Original release
- Network: TVN
- Release: September 7, 2016

Azja Express (series 3 and 4 as Ameryka Express, series 7 as Afryka Express) is the Polish version of the reality show Peking Express that has been broadcast on TVN since 2016. The show aims at demonstrating how couples of celebrities deal with the challenges and pitfalls of attempting a long-distance hitchhike to a strange city, together with all the difficulties presented by trying to communicate in a language they don't understand.

== Series overview ==
| Installment | Year | Winning couple | Route | Visited countries |
|---|---|---|---|---|
| Azja Express | 2016 | Michał Żurawski, Ludwik Borkowski | Hải Dương to Bangkok | Vietnam, Laos, Cambodia, Thailand |
| Azja Express | 2017 | Antoni Pawlicki, Paweł Ławrynowicz | Sigiriya to Mumbai | Sri Lanka, India |
| Ameryka Express | 2018 | Aleksandra Domańska, Dawid Domański | San Antonio de Ibarra to Cusco | Ecuador, Peru |
| Ameryka Express | 2020 | Karolina Pisarek, Marta Gajewska-Komorowska | Antigua to Cartagena | Guatemala, Colombia |
| Azja Express | 2023 | Angelika Trochonowicz, Łukasz Trochonowicz | Istanbul to Tashkent | Turkey, Georgia, Uzbekistan |
| Azja Express | 2024 | Jan Błachowicz, Józef Gąsienica-Gładczan | Manila to Taipei | Philippines, Taiwan |
| Afryka Express | 2025 | Edyta Zając, Michał Mikołajczak | Kilimanjaro to Nairobi | Tanzania, Kenya |
| Azja Express | 2026 | | Bali to Singapore | Indonesia, Malaysia, Singapore |

== Travel ==
=== Season I ===
| Season | Route | Visited countries |
|---|---|---|
| 2016 | Hai Duong, Vietnam to Bangkok, Thailand | Vietnam, Laos, Cambodia, Thailand |

| Episode | Country | Route |
|---|---|---|
| 1 | Vietnam | Hai Duong --- Hạ Long ---Night--- Haiphong |
| 2 | Vietnam | Haiphong --- Tam Cốc-Bích Động ---Night--- Hanoi |
| 3 | Vietnam | Lào Cai --- Bắc Hà --- Ban Pho ---Night--- Tạ Văn |
| 4 | Vietnam | Tạ Văn --- Na Phat ---Night--- Muong Pon --- Điện Biên Phủ |
| 5 | Laos | Ban Sang Ha --- Ban Pa Ho --- Luang Prabang ---Night--- Piengfa |
| 6 | Laos | Piengfa --- Houamouang --- Nathon (Night) --- Vientiane |
| 7 | Laos | Vientiane --- Ban Nam Lo --- Pakkading ---Night--- Thakhek |
| 8 | Laos | Thakhek --- Kengkabao (Night) --- Naphong --- Paxe |
| 9 | Cambodia | Stung Treng --- Sandan --- Kratie ---Night--- Meak Thmey |
| 10 | Cambodia | Meak Thmey --- Chamkar Andoung ---Night--- Wat Preak Bankang --- Phnom Penh |
| 11 | Cambodia | Phnom Penh --- Andoung Chron --- Andoung Rusey --- Chong Koh (Night) --- Battambang |
| 12 | Cambodia | Battambang --- Preah Netr Preah --- Siem Reap (Night) --- Angkor --- Angkor Wat |
| 13 | Thailand | Wat Maha That --- Suan Som Deij --- Suphanburi --- Sathon Port Thonburi --- Lumpini Park Bangkok --- (Night) --- Wat Suthat --- Pratunam --- Pak Klong Talad --- Wat Rakhang --- Prince Palace Hotel --- Wat Pho |

=== Season II ===
| Season | Route | Visited countries |
|---|---|---|
| 2017 | Sigiriya, Sri Lanka to Mumbai, India | Sri Lanka, India |

=== Season IV ===
| Season | Route | Visited countries |
|---|---|---|
| 2020 | | Guatemala, Colombia |

| Episode | Country | Route |
|---|---|---|
| 1 | Guatemala | Antigua Guatemala --- Cocales --- San Lucas Tolimán --- Night--- Chichicastenango |
| 2 | Guatemala | Chichicastenango --- Agua Escondida --- Night--- Tecpán --- Sumpango |
| 3 | Guatemala | San Pedro Sacatepéquez --- Night--- Pacaya --- Guatemala City (Plazuela Espana --- Diamanete De Beisbol) |
| 4 | Guatemala | Guatemala City --- Sanarate --- Guastatoya --- Night--- Cobán |
| 5 | Guatemala | Cobán --- Night --- Sayaxche --- San Benito |
| 6 | Guatemala | Tikal --- Night --- Castle of San Felipe de Lara |
| 7 | Guatemala | San Felipe --- Rio Dulce --- Night - Zacapa |
| 8 | Colombia | Bogotá --- Lago Foquene --- Chiquinquira --- Night - Socorro |
| 9 | Colombia | Socorro --- Night --- San Gil --- Bucaramanga |
| 10 | Colombia | Bucaramanga --- San Alberto --- San Martín, Cesar --- Night --- La Playa de Belén |

== Season I ==
| Place | Celebrity | Occupation/Job | Companion | Occupation/Job |
|---|---|---|---|---|
| 1 | Michał Żurawski | Actor | Ludwik Borkowski | Actor |
| 2 | Agnieszka Włodarczyk | Actress | Maria Konarowska | Actress |
| 3 | Izabella Miko | Actress | Leszek Stanek | Actor |
| 4 | Pascal Brodnicki | Chef, TVN star | Paweł Dobrzański | Chef |
| 5 | Renata Kaczoruk | Model | Weronika Budziło | Lawyer |
| 6 | Hanna Lis | Journalist | Łukasz Jemioł | Designer |
| 7 | Małgorzata Rozenek-Majdan | TVN presenter | Radosław Majdan | Football player |
| 8 | Przemysław Saleta | Boxer | Dariusz Kuźniak | Chef |

| Place | Episode | | | | | | | | | | | | | | | | | | | | | | | | | | | | | | |
| Place | 1 | | 2 | | 3 | | 4 | | 5 | | 6^{1} | | | | 7 | | 8 | | 9 | | 10 | | 11 | | 12 | | 13 | | | | |
| Place | Day 1 | Day 2 | | | | | | | | | | | | | | | | | | | | | | | | | | | | | |
| Place | Day 1 | Day 2 | | Day 3 | | | | | | | | | | | | | | | | | | | | | | | | | | | |
| Place | Day 1 | Day 2 | | Day 3 | Day 4 | Day 5 | | | | | | | | | | | | | | | | | | | | | | | | | |
| Place | Day 1 | Day 2 | | Day 3 | Day 4 | Day 5 | | Day 6 | | | | | | | | | | | | | | | | | | | | | | | |
| Place | Day 1 | Day 2 | | Day 3 | Day 4 | Day 5 | | Day 6 | Day 7 | Day 8 | | | | | | | | | | | | | | | | | | | | | |
| Place | Day 1 | Day 2 | | Day 3 | Day 4 | Day 5 | | Day 6 | Day 7 | Day 8 | | | Day 9 | | | | | | | | | | | | | | | | | | |
| Place | Day 1 | Day 2 | | Day 3 | Day 4 | Day 5 | | Day 6 | Day 7 | Day 8 | | | Day 9 | | Day 10 | Day 11 | | | | | | | | | | | | | | | |
| Place | Day 1 | Day 2 | | Day 3 | Day 4 | Day 5 | | Day 6 | Day 7 | Day 8 | | | Day 9 | | Day 10 | Day 11 | | Day 12 | | | | | | | | | | | | | |
| Place | Day 1 | Day 2 | | Day 3 | Day 4 | Day 5 | | Day 6 | Day 7 | Day 8 | | | Day 9 | | Day 10 | Day 11 | | Day 12 | Day 13 | Day 14 | | | | | | | | | | | |
| Place | Day 1 | Day 2 | | Day 3 | Day 4 | Day 5 | | Day 6 | Day 7 | Day 8 | | | Day 9 | | Day 10 | Day 11 | | Day 12 | Day 13 | Day 14 | | Day 15 | | | | | | | | | |
| Place | Day 1 | Day 2 | | Day 3 | Day 4 | Day 5 | | Day 6 | Day 7 | Day 8 | | | Day 9 | | Day 10 | Day 11 | | Day 12 | Day 13 | Day 14 | | Day 15 | Day 16 | Day 17 | | | | | | | |
| Place | Day 1 | Day 2 | | Day 3 | Day 4 | Day 5 | | Day 6 | Day 7 | Day 8 | | | Day 9 | | Day 10 | Day 11 | | Day 12 | Day 13 | Day 14 | | Day 15 | Day 16 | Day 17 | | Day 18 | | | | | |
| Place | Day 1 | Day 2 | | Day 3 | Day 4 | Day 5 | | Day 6 | Day 7 | Day 8 | | | Day 9 | | Day 10 | Day 11 | | Day 12 | Day 13 | Day 14 | | Day 15 | Day 16 | Day 17 | | Day 18 | Day 19 | | Day 20 | | |
|---|---|---|---|---|---|---|---|---|---|---|---|---|---|---|---|---|---|---|---|---|---|---|---|---|---|---|---|---|---|---|---|
| 1 | Izabella & Leszek | Pascal & Paweł | Michał & Ludwik (10 000 zł) | Renata & Weronika | Małgorzata & Radosław | Hanna & Łukasz | Michał & Ludwik | Renata & Weronika | Michał & Ludwik (5000 zł) | Hanna & Łukasz | Renata | Leszek | Pascal | Izabella | Michał & Ludwik | Renata & Weronika | Pascal & Paweł (10 000 zł) | Pascal & Paweł | Michał & Ludwik (5000 zł) | Agnieszka & Maria | Renata & Weronika (10 000 zł) | Michał & Ludwik; Pascal & Paweł | Pascal & Paweł (5000 zł) | Pascal & Paweł (27 kg) | Michał & Ludwik | Izabella & Leszek (30 000 zł) | Michał & Ludwik | Michał & Ludwik (40 000 zł) | Michał & Ludwik (10 000 zł) | Michał & Ludwik (20 000 zł) | Michał & Ludwik (90 000 zł) |
| 2 | Małgorzata & Radosław | Hanna & Łukasz | Hanna & Łukasz | Michał & Ludwik | Hanna & Łukasz | Pascal & Paweł | Małgorzata & Radosław | Agnieszka & Maria | Izabella & Leszek | - | Pascal | Izabella | Weronika | Michał | Agnieszka & Maria (5000 zł) | Agnieszka & Maria | Agnieszka & Maria | Agnieszka & Maria (5000 zł) | Renata & Weronika | Izabella & Leszek | Michał & Ludwik | - | Michał & Ludwik | Michał & Ludwik (27.5 kg) | Pascal & Paweł (10 000 zł) | Michał & Ludwik | Agnieszka & Maria (5000 zł) | Agnieszka & Maria | Agnieszka & Maria | Agnieszka & Maria | Agnieszka & Maria |
| 3 | Pascal & Paweł (5000 zł) | Małgorzata & Radosław | Małgorzata & Radosław | Agnieszka & Maria | Pascal & Paweł | Renata & Weronika | - | Pascal & Paweł | Hanna & Łukasz | - | - | - | Ludwik | Maria | Hanna & Łukasz | Michał & Ludwik | Hanna & Łukasz | Michał & Ludwik | Pascal & Paweł | Renata & Weronika | Pascal & Paweł | Izabella & Leszek | Agnieszka & Maria | Izabella & Leszek (24 kg) | Izabella & Leszek | Pascal & Paweł | Izabella & Leszek | Izabella & Leszek | - | - | - |
| 4 | Hanna & Łukasz | Agnieszka & Maria | Renata & Weronika | Małgorzata & Radosław | Renata & Weronika (5000 zł) | Małgorzata & Radosław | - | Izabella & Leszek | Renata & Weronika | - | - | - | Agnieszka | Paweł | Pascal & Paweł | Pascal & Paweł | Izabella & Leszek | Izabella & Leszek (10 000 zł) | - | Michał & Ludwik | Izabella & Leszek | Renata & Weronika | Izabella & Leszek | Agnieszka & Maria (28 kg) | - | - | - | - | - | - | - |
| 5 | Agnieszka & Maria | Renata & Weronika | - | Izabella & Leszek | - | - | - | Michał & Ludwik | Agnieszka & Maria | - | - | - | Leszek | Renata | Izabella & Leszek | Hanna & Łukasz; Izabella & Leszek | Michał & Ludwik | Hanna & Łukasz | - | Pascal & Paweł | - | - | - | - | - | - | - | - | - | - | - |
| 6 | - | Przemysław & Dariusz | - | Hanna & Łukasz | - | - | - | Małgorzata & Radosław | Pascal & Paweł | - | - | - | - | - | Renata & Weronika | - | - | - | - | - | - | - | - | - | - | - | - | - | - | - | - |
| 7 | - | Izabela & Leszek | - | Przemysław & Dariusz | - | - | - | - | - | - | - | - | - | - | - | - | - | - | - | - | - | - | - | - | - | - | - | - | - | - | - |
| 8 | - | Michał & Ludwik | - | - | - | - | - | - | - | - | - | - | - | - | - | - | - | - | - | - | - | - | - | - | - | - | - | - | - | - | - |
| Couple with immunity | - | - | Pascal & Paweł | | - | - | Hanna & Łukasz (10 000 zł) | Hanna & Łukasz | - | - | Hanna (5000 zł) | Łukasz (5000 zł) | Hanna & Łukasz | | - | - | Renata & Weronika | Renata & Weronika (5000 zł) | - | - | Agnieszka & Maria | Agnieszka & Maria (20 000 zł) | - | - | Agnieszka & Maria | | - | - | - | - | - |

Immunity in the next episode
Elimination
Amulet
Minus one place (Black flag)
Couple with amulet from eliminated couple
The couple voluntarily left the show.
Minus one place and elimination

1. In episode 6 contestants raced in mixed-up pairs - one person was a "speeder" and the other one was a "blocker".

=== Ratings ===
| Episode | Date | Audience | Share 4+ | Share 16-49 |
|---|---|---|---|---|
| 1 | 7 September | 2 078 063 | 17,24% | 24,43% |
| 2 | 14 September | 1 592 865 | 12,73% | 18,02% |
| 3 | 21 September | 1 571 624 | 13,32% | 19,75% |
| 4 | 28 September | 1 578 534 | 12,89% | 19,19% |
| 5 | 5 October | 1 540 576 | 12,10% | 18,80% |
| 6 | 12 October | 1 661 980 | 13,56% | 19,83% |
| 7 | 19 October | 1 433 410 | 11,63% | 16,60% |
| 8 | 26 October | 1 514 545 | 11,93% | 18,25% |
| 9 | 2 November | 1 440 826 | 10,56% | 15,16% |
| 10 | 9 November | 1 603 796 | 12,97% | 19,94% |
| 11 | 16 November | 1 688 925 | 13,17% | 19,59% |
| 12 | 23 November | 1 501 301 | 12,20% | 16,84% |
| 13 | 30 November | 1 843 822 | 14,50% | 19,92% |
| Average | 2016 | 1 619 600 | 12,96% | 18,91% |

== Season II ==
| Place | Celebrity | Occupation/Job | Companion | Occupation/Job |
|---|---|---|---|---|
| 1 | Antoni Pawlicki | Actor | Paweł Ławrynowicz | Actor |
| 2 | Michał Piróg | Choreographer | Piotr Czaykowski | Model |
| 3^{2} | Stanisław Karpiel-Bułecka | Future Folk singer | Marta Wierzbicka | Soap opera actress |
| 4 | Joanna Przetakiewicz | Fashion designer | Łukasz Jakóbiak | YouTube star |
| 5 | Zuzanna Bijoch | Model | Julia Bijoch | Zuzanna's sister |
| 6 | Dorota Gardias | TVN Weather presenter | Katarzyna Domeracka | Businesswoman |
| 7 | Marta Wierzbicka | Soap opera actress | Oliwia Cabaj | Photographer |
| 8 | Stanisław Karpiel-Bułecka | Future Folk singer | Szymon Chyc-Magdzin | Future Folk singer and violinist |
| 9 | Tymon Tymański | Musician | Lucas Tymanski | Tymon's son |

| Place | Episode | | | | | | | | | | | | | | | | | | | | | | | | | | | | | |
| Place | 1 | | 2 | | 3 | | 4 | | 5 | | 6 | | 7 | | 8 ^{3} | | | | 9 | | 10 ^{4} | | 11 | | 12 | | 13 | | | |
| Place | Day 1 | Day 2 | | | | | | | | | | | | | | | | | | | | | | | | | | | | |
| Place | Day 1 | Day 2 | | Day 3 | | | | | | | | | | | | | | | | | | | | | | | | | | |
| Place | Day 1 | Day 2 | | Day 3 | Day 4 | Day 5 | | | | | | | | | | | | | | | | | | | | | | | | |
| Place | Day 1 | Day 2 | | Day 3 | Day 4 | Day 5 | | Day 6 | | | | | | | | | | | | | | | | | | | | | | |
| Place | Day 1 | Day 2 | | Day 3 | Day 4 | Day 5 | | Day 6 | Day 7 | Day 8 | | | | | | | | | | | | | | | | | | | | |
| Place | Day 1 | Day 2 | | Day 3 | Day 4 | Day 5 | | Day 6 | Day 7 | Day 8 | | Day 9 | | | | | | | | | | | | | | | | | | |
| Place | Day 1 | Day 2 | | Day 3 | Day 4 | Day 5 | | Day 6 | Day 7 | Day 8 | | Day 9 | Day 10 | Day 11 | | | | | | | | | | | | | | | | |
| Place | Day 1 | Day 2 | | Day 3 | Day 4 | Day 5 | | Day 6 | Day 7 | Day 8 | | Day 9 | Day 10 | Day 11 | | | Day 12 | | | | | | | | | | | | | |
| Place | Day 1 | Day 2 | | Day 3 | Day 4 | Day 5 | | Day 6 | Day 7 | Day 8 | | Day 9 | Day 10 | Day 11 | | | Day 12 | | Day 13 | Day 14 | | | | | | | | | | |
| Place | Day 1 | Day 2 | | Day 3 | Day 4 | Day 5 | | Day 6 | Day 7 | Day 8 | | Day 9 | Day 10 | Day 11 | | | Day 12 | | Day 13 | Day 14 | | Day 15 | | | | | | | | |
| Place | Day 1 | Day 2 | | Day 3 | Day 4 | Day 5 | | Day 6 | Day 7 | Day 8 | | Day 9 | Day 10 | Day 11 | | | Day 12 | | Day 13 | Day 14 | | Day 15 | Day 16 | Day 17 | | | | | | |
| Place | Day 1 | Day 2 | | Day 3 | Day 4 | Day 5 | | Day 6 | Day 7 | Day 8 | | Day 9 | Day 10 | Day 11 | | | Day 12 | | Day 13 | Day 14 | | Day 15 | Day 16 | Day 17 | | Day 18 | | | | |
| Place | Day 1 | Day 2 | | Day 3 | Day 4 | Day 5 | | Day 6 | Day 7 | Day 8 | | Day 9 | Day 10 | Day 11 | | | Day 12 | | Day 13 | Day 14 | | Day 15 | Day 16 | Day 17 | | Day 18 | Day 19 | | Day 20 | |
|---|---|---|---|---|---|---|---|---|---|---|---|---|---|---|---|---|---|---|---|---|---|---|---|---|---|---|---|---|---|---|
| 1 | Marta & Oliwia | Marta & Oliwia | Stanisław & Szymon | Zuzanna & Julia | Joanna & Łukasz | Michał & Piotr | Zuzanna & Julia (10 000 zł) | - | Antoni & Paweł | Joanna & Łukasz | Antoni & Paweł (10 000 zł) | Michał & Piotr (10 000 zł) | Michał & Piotr | Dorota & Katarzyna | Dorota (5000 zł) | Antoni | Łukasz | Paweł | Marta & Stanisław (15 000 zł) | Michał & Piotr | Antoni (& Paweł) | Marta (& Stanisław) | Michał & Piotr; Marta & Stanisław | Antoni & Paweł | Marta & Stanisław | Michał & Piotr | Antoni & Paweł (15 000 zł) | Michał & Piotr (45 000 zł) | Antoni & Paweł (15 000 zł) | Antoni & Paweł (55 000 zł) |
| 2 | Dorota & Katarzyna (5000 zł) | Dorota & Katarzyna; Zuzanna & Julia | Joanna & Łukasz | Antoni & Paweł; Michał & Piotr | Zuzanna & Julia (5000 zł) | Joanna & Łukasz | Joanna & Łukasz | - | Joanna & Łukasz (5000 zł) | Antoni & Paweł | Dorota & Katarzyna | Zuzanna & Julia | Zuzanna & Julia (5000 zł) | Zuzanna & Julia | Stanisław | Katarzyna (5000 zł) | Antoni | Dorota | Antoni & Paweł | Marta & Stanisław | Marta (& Stanisław) | Antoni (& Paweł) (20 000 zł) | Joanna & Łukasz (25 000 zł) | Michał & Piotr | - | Joanna & Łukasz | Michał & Piotr | Antoni & Paweł | Michał & Piotr | Michał & Piotr |
| 3 | Joanna & Łukasz | - | Zuzanna & Julia | Joanna & Łukasz | Michał & Piotr | Dorota & Katarzyna | Dorota & Katarzyna | - | Marta & Oliwia | Marta & Oliwia | Zuzanna & Julia | Antoni & Paweł | - | Joanna & Łukasz | Paweł | Łukasz | Piotr | Joanna | Michał & Piotr (5000 zł) | Zuzanna & Julia; Joanna & Łukasz; Antoni & Paweł | Łukasz (& Joanna) | Łukasz (& Joanna) | Antoni & Paweł (15 000 zł) | Joanna & Łukasz | - | - | Marta & Stanisław (30 000 zł) | Marta & Stanisław | - | - |
| 4 | Michał & Piotr | - | Antoni & Paweł | Dorota & Katarzyna | Antoni & Paweł | - | Antoni & Paweł | - | - | - | Marta & Oliwia | Dorota & Katarzyna | - | Michał & Piotr | Joanna & Piotr; Michał & Marta | | Marta | Michał | Zuzanna & Julia | - | Julia (& Zuzanna) | Julia (& Zuzanna) | - | Marta & Stanisław | - | - | - | - | - | - |
| 5 | Antoni & Paweł | - | Michał & Piotr | Stanisław & Szymon | Stanisław & Szymon | - | Stanisław & Szymon | - | - | - | Michał & Piotr | Oliwia | - | Marta & Stanisław | - | - | Katarzyna | Stanisław | Joanna & Łukasz | - | - | - | - | - | - | - | - | - | - | - |
| 6 | Zuzanna & Julia | - | Dorota & Katarzyna | Tymon & Lucas | Dorota & Katarzyna | - | Marta & Oliwia | Szymon | - | - | - | - | - | Antoni & Paweł | - | - | - | - | - | - | - | - | - | - | - | - | - | - | - | - |
| 7 | Stanisław & Szymon | - | Tymon & Lucas | - | Marta & Oliwia | Antoni & Paweł | - | - | - | - | - | - | - | - | - | - | - | - | - | - | - | - | - | - | - | - | - | - | - | - |
| 8 | Tymon & Lucas | - | - | - | - | - | - | - | - | - | - | - | - | - | - | - | - | - | - | - | - | - | - | - | - | - | - | - | - | - |
| Couple with immunity | - | - | Marta & Oliwia (10 000 zł) | Marta & Oliwia | - | - | Michał & Piotr | | - | - | Joanna & Łukasz | | - | - | Zuzanna & Julia | | | | - | - | Michał & Piotr | | - | - | Antoni & Paweł | Antoni & Paweł (10 000 zł) | - | - | - | - |

Immunity in the next episode
Elimination
Amulet
Couple with amulet from eliminated couple
The couple lost money
Minus one place and elimination

1. Stanisław & Marta with their partners got eliminated in episodes 4 & 6, but were brought back to the competition in episode 7 as one couple.
2. In episode 8 contestants raced in mixed-up pairs - one person was a "speeder" and the other one was a "blocker".
3. In episode 10 couples were separated - one person was racing and the other one was trying to help them by doing challenges.

== Season III ==
| Place | Celebrity | Occupation/Job | Companion | Occupation/Job |
|---|---|---|---|---|
| 1 | Aleksandra Domańska | Actress | Dawid Domański | Domańska's brother |
| 2 | Pamela Stafanowicz | Influencer Fit Lovers | Mateusz Janusz | Influencer Fit Lovers |
| 3 | Maciej Musiałowski | Actor | Anna Małysa | Maciej's friend |
| 4 | Tomasz Karolak | Actor | Jakub Urbański | Photographer |
| 5 | Filip Chajzer | TV Presenter | Zygmunt Chajzer | TV Presenter |
| 6 | Lara Gessler | Restaurateur | Piotr Sałata | Fashion designer |
| 7^{5} | Magda Steczkowska | Singer | Katarzyna Meller | TV Presenter |
| 8 | Magda Steczkowska | Singer | Piotr Królik | Drummer |
| 9 | Katarzyna Meller | TV Presenter | Monika Zagajewska | Businesswoman |

| Place | Episode | | | | | | | | | | | | | | | | | | | | | | | | | | | | | |
| Place | 1 | | 2 | | 3 | | 4 | | 5 | | | 6 | | 7 | | 8 | | 9 ^{6} | | 10 | | | 11 | | 12 | | | 13 | | |
| Place | Day 1 | Day 2 | | | | | | | | | | | | | | | | | | | | | | | | | | | | |
| Place | Day 1 | Day 2 | | Day 3 | | | | | | | | | | | | | | | | | | | | | | | | | | |
| Place | Day 1 | Day 2 | | Day 3 | Day 4 | Day 5 | | | | | | | | | | | | | | | | | | | | | | | | |
| Place | Day 1 | Day 2 | | Day 3 | Day 4 | Day 5 | | Day 6 | | | | | | | | | | | | | | | | | | | | | | |
| Place | Day 1 | Day 2 | | Day 3 | Day 4 | Day 5 | | Day 6 | Day 7 | Day 8 | | | | | | | | | | | | | | | | | | | | |
| Place | Day 1 | Day 2 | | Day 3 | Day 4 | Day 5 | | Day 6 | Day 7 | Day 8 | | Day 9 | | | | | | | | | | | | | | | | | | |
| Place | Day 1 | Day 2 | | Day 3 | Day 4 | Day 5 | | Day 6 | Day 7 | Day 8 | | Day 9 | Day 10 | | Day 11 | | | | | | | | | | | | | | | |
| Place | Day 1 | Day 2 | | Day 3 | Day 4 | Day 5 | | Day 6 | Day 7 | Day 8 | | Day 9 | Day 10 | | Day 11 | | | Day 12 | | | | | | | | | | | | |
| Place | Day 1 | Day 2 | | Day 3 | Day 4 | Day 5 | | Day 6 | Day 7 | Day 8 | | Day 9 | Day 10 | | Day 11 | | | Day 12 | | | Day 13 | Day 14 | | | | | | | | |
| Place | Day 1 | Day 2 | | Day 3 | Day 4 | Day 5 | | Day 6 | Day 7 | Day 8 | | Day 9 | Day 10 | | Day 11 | | | Day 12 | | | Day 13 | Day 14 | | Day 15 | | | | | | |
| Place | Day 1 | Day 2 | | Day 3 | Day 4 | Day 5 | | Day 6 | Day 7 | Day 8 | | Day 9 | Day 10 | | Day 11 | | | Day 12 | | | Day 13 | Day 14 | | Day 15 | Day 16 | Day 17 | | | | |
| Place | Day 1 | Day 2 | | Day 3 | Day 4 | Day 5 | | Day 6 | Day 7 | Day 8 | | Day 9 | Day 10 | | Day 11 | | | Day 12 | | | Day 13 | Day 14 | | Day 15 | Day 16 | Day 17 | | Day 18 | | |
| Place | Day 1 | Day 2 | | Day 3 | Day 4 | Day 5 | | Day 6 | Day 7 | Day 8 | | Day 9 | Day 10 | | Day 11 | | | Day 12 | | | Day 13 | Day 14 | | Day 15 | Day 16 | Day 17 | | Day 18 | Day 19 | |
|---|---|---|---|---|---|---|---|---|---|---|---|---|---|---|---|---|---|---|---|---|---|---|---|---|---|---|---|---|---|---|
| 1 | Pamela & Mateusz (5000 zł) | Lara & Piotr | Tomasz & Jakub (10 000 zł) | Pamela & Mateusz; Maciej & Anna | Pamela & Mateusz | Tomasz & Jakub | Pamela & Mateusz (10 000 zł) | Aleksandra & Dawid | Filip & Zygmunt | Lara & Piotr | Filip & Zygmunt | Pamela & Mateusz | Pamela & Mateusz | Lara & Piotr (10 000 zł) | Aleksandra & Dawid; Maciej & Anna | Lara & Piotr | Maciej & Anna (5.2 m) | Filip & Pamela | Filip & Pamela | Maciej & Anna | Maciej & Anna | Maciej & Anna | Pamela & Mateusz (10 000 zł) | Pamela & Mateusz | Maciej & Anna | Aleksandra & Dawid (10 000 zł) | Maciej & Anna | Maciej & Anna (15 000 zł) | Aleksandra & Dawid (50 000 zł) | Aleksandra & Dawid (60 000 zł) |
| 2 | Magda & Piotr | Tomasz & Jakub | Filip & Zygmunt | Pamela & Mateusz; Maciej & Anna | Aleksandra & Dawid | - | - | Maciej & Anna | Lara & Piotr | - | Maciej & Anna | Aleksandra & Dawid | Filip & Zygmunt | Maciej & Anna | Aleksandra & Dawid; Maciej & Anna | Tomasz & Jakub | Pamela & Mateusz (6.5 m) | Aleksandra & Zygmunt | Mateusz & Jakub | Aleksandra & Dawid | Pamela & Mateusz (5000 zł) | Tomasz & Jakub (5000 zł) | Maciej & Anna (15 000 zł) | Maciej & Anna | Tomasz & Jakub | Maciej & Anna | Aleksandra & Dawid | Pamela & Mateusz | Pamela & Mateusz | Pamela & Mateusz |
| 3 | Katarzyna & Monika | - | Magda & Piotr | Aleksandra & Dawid | Lara & Piotr (5000 zł) | - | - | Filip & Zygmunt | Maciej & Anna (5000 zł) | - | Tomasz & Jakub | Filip & Zygmunt (5000 zł) | Maciej & Anna | Tomasz & Jakub | Filip & Zygmunt | Maciej & Anna (5000 zł) | Tomasz & Jakub (12 m) (15 000 zł) | Mateusz & Jakub | Aleksandra & Zygmunt | - | - | Pamela & Mateusz | Tomasz & Jakub | Tomasz & Jakub | Aleksandra & Dawid | Tomasz & Jakub | Tomasz & Jakub | Aleksandra & Dawid | Maciej & Anna | - |
| 4 | Maciej & Anna | - | - | Filip & Zygmunt | Maciej & Anna | - | - | Lara & Piotr | Pamela & Mateusz; Magda & Katarzyna | - | Pamela & Mateusz | Lara & Piotr | Lara & Piotr | Aleksandra & Dawid | Tomasz & Jakub; Lara & Piotr | Aleksandra & Dawid | Aleksandra & Dawid (26 m) | Tomasz & Dawid | Tomasz & Dawid | - | - | Aleksandra & Dawid | Aleksandra & Dawid | Aleksandra & Dawid | - | | | | | |
| 5 | Aleksandra & Dawid | - | - | Magda & Piotr | Tomasz & Jakub | - | - | Pamela & Mateusz | Pamela & Mateusz; Magda & Katarzyna | - | Magda & Katarzyna | Tomasz & Jakub | Tomasz & Jakub | Filip & Zygmunt | Tomasz & Jakub; Lara & Piotr | Pamela & Mateusz | Filip & Zygmunt (11.5 m) | - | - | - | - | Filip & Zygmunt | - | | | | | | | |
| 6 | Filip & Zygmunt | - | - | Tomasz & Jakub | Magda & Piotr | Magda & Piotr | - | Piotr | Tomasz & Jakub | - | | Maciej & Anna | Aleksandra & Dawid | - | - | Filip & Zygmunt | Lara & Piotr (24.5 m) | - | | | | | | | | | | | | |
| 7 | Lara & Piotr | - | - | Monika | Filip & Zygmunt | Filip & Zygmunt | - | | | | | | | | | | | | | | | | | | | | | | | |
| 8 | Tomasz & Jakub | Filip & Zygmunt | - | | | | | | | | | | | | | | | | | | | | | | | | | | | |
| Couple with immunity | - | | Lara & Piotr | | - | | Tomasz & Jakub | | Aleksandra & Dawid | | Aleksandra & Dawid; Lara & Piotr | - | | Pamela & Mateusz | | - | | Maciej & Anna (10 000 zł) | Maciej & Anna | - | | | | | Pamela & Mateusz | | Pamela & Mateusz (30 000 zł) | - | | |

Immunity in the next episode
Elimination
Amulet
Lost money
Couple with amulet from eliminated couple
The couple lost money
Plus one place

1. Magda & Katarzyna with their partners got eliminated in episodes 2 & 4, but were brought back to the competition in episode 5 as one couple.
2. In episode 9 contestants raced in mixed-up pairs - one person was a "speeder" and the other one was a "blocker".

=== Ratings ===
| Episode | Date | Audience | Share 4+ | Share 16-49 |
|---|---|---|---|---|
| 1 | 5 September | 1 568 759 | 13.42% | 20.45% |
| 2 | 12 September | 1 493 727 | 13.05% | 20.21% |
| 3 | 19 September | 1 525 971 | 12.83% | 18.22% |
| 4 | 26 September | 1 651 135 | 14.28% | 20.96 |
| 5 | 3 October | 1 636 462 | 13.58% | 18.91% |
| 6 | 10 October | 1 506 638 | 12.68% | 17.63% |
| 7 | 17 October | 1 615 760 | 13.94% | 19.59% |
| 8 | 24 October | 1 490 836 | 11.72% | 17.33% |
| 9 | 31 October | 1 524 974 | 12.09% | 16.40% |
| 10 | 7 November | 1 271 263 | 10.57% | 15.02% |
| 11 | 13 November | 1 394 352 | 11.65% | 16.25% |
| 12 | 20 November | 1 568 690 | 13.00% | 17.98% |
| 13 | 27 November | 1 633 469 | 13.28% | 19.95% |
| 2018 | Season III | 1 532 734 | 12.77% | 18.34% |

== Season IV ==
| Place | Celebrity | Occupation/Job | Companion | Occupation/Job |
|---|---|---|---|---|
| 1 | Karolina Pisarek | Model, Top Model runner-up | Marta Gajewska-Komorowska | Model |
| 2 | Grzegorz Collins | TVN Turbo & Discovery Channel presenter | Rafał Collins | TVN Turbo & Discovery Channel presenter |
| 3 | Paweł Deląg | Actor | Dariusz Lipka | Paweł's friend |
| 4 | Małgorzata Heretyk | YouTuber, 19+ actress | Ernest Musiał | YouTuber, 19+ actor |
| 5 | Patrycja Markowska | Singer | Żaneta Lubera | Singer, The Voice of Poland semi-finalist |
| 6 | Marcin Różalski | Kick boxer, MMA fighter | Bartosz Fabiński | MMA fighter |
| 7 | Grażyna Wolszczak | Actress | Filip Sikora | Son of Grażyna |
| 8 | Iwona Burnat-Benjamin | Żony Hollywood star | Reggie Benjamin | Żony Hollywood star, singer |

| Place | Episode | | | | | | | | | | | | | | | | | | | | | | | | | | |
| Place | 1 | | 2 | | 3 | | 4 | | 5 | | | 6 | | 7 | | 8 | | 9 | | 10 | | 11 | 12 | | 13 | | |
| Place | Day 1 | Day 2 | | | | | | | | | | | | | | | | | | | | | | | | | |
| Place | Day 1 | Day 2 | | Day 3 | | | | | | | | | | | | | | | | | | | | | | | |
| Place | Day 1 | Day 2 | | Day 3 | Day 4 | Day 5 | | | | | | | | | | | | | | | | | | | | | |
| Place | Day 1 | Day 2 | | Day 3 | Day 4 | Day 5 | | Day 6 | | | | | | | | | | | | | | | | | | | |
| Place | Day 1 | Day 2 | | Day 3 | Day 4 | Day 5 | | Day 6 | Day 7 | Day 8 | | | | | | | | | | | | | | | | | |
| Place | Day 1 | Day 2 | | Day 3 | Day 4 | Day 5 | | Day 6 | Day 7 | Day 8 | | Day 9 | | | | | | | | | | | | | | | |
| Place | Day 1 | Day 2 | | Day 3 | Day 4 | Day 5 | | Day 6 | Day 7 | Day 8 | | Day 9 | Day 10 | | Day 11 | | | | | | | | | | | | |
| Place | Day 1 | Day 2 | | Day 3 | Day 4 | Day 5 | | Day 6 | Day 7 | Day 8 | | Day 9 | Day 10 | | Day 11 | Day 12 | | | | | | | | | | | |
| Place | Day 1 | Day 2 | | Day 3 | Day 4 | Day 5 | | Day 6 | Day 7 | Day 8 | | Day 9 | Day 10 | | Day 11 | Day 12 | Day 13 | | Day 14 | | | | | | | | |
| Place | Day 1 | Day 2 | | Day 3 | Day 4 | Day 5 | | Day 6 | Day 7 | Day 8 | | Day 9 | Day 10 | | Day 11 | Day 12 | Day 13 | | Day 14 | Day 15 | | | | | | | |
| Place | Day 1 | Day 2 | | Day 3 | Day 4 | Day 5 | | Day 6 | Day 7 | Day 8 | | Day 9 | Day 10 | | Day 11 | Day 12 | Day 13 | | Day 14 | Day 15 | Day 16 | | | | | | |
| Place | Day 1 | Day 2 | | Day 3 | Day 4 | Day 5 | | Day 6 | Day 7 | Day 8 | | Day 9 | Day 10 | | Day 11 | Day 12 | Day 13 | | Day 14 | Day 15 | Day 16 | Day 17&18 | | | | | |
| Place | Day 1 | Day 2 | | Day 3 | Day 4 | Day 5 | | Day 6 | Day 7 | Day 8 | | Day 9 | Day 10 | | Day 11 | Day 12 | Day 13 | | Day 14 | Day 15 | Day 16 | Day 17&18 | Day 19 | Day 20 | | Day 21 | |
|---|---|---|---|---|---|---|---|---|---|---|---|---|---|---|---|---|---|---|---|---|---|---|---|---|---|---|---|
| 1 | Grzegorz & Rafał | Grażyna & Filip | Grzegorz & Rafał (10 000 zł) | Patrycja & Żaneta | Grzegorz & Rafał | Małgorzata & Ernest | Patrycja & Dariusz | Paweł & Żaneta | - | Grzegorz & Rafał | Małgorzata & Ernest | Karolina & Marta (10 000 zł) | Małgorzata & Ernest | Grażyna & Filip (10 000 zł) | Małgorzata & Ernest | Małgorzata & Ernest | Karolina & Marta | Małgorzata & Ernest | Małgorzata & Ernest | Grzegorz & Rafał (10 000 zł) | Małgorzata & Ernest | Paweł & Dariusz (10 000 zł) | Grzegorz & Rafał | Grzegorz & Rafał (45 000 zł) | Karolina & Marta | Grzegorz & Rafał (30 000 zł) | Karolina & Marta (45 000 zł) |
| 2 | Małgorzata & Ernest | - | Karolina & Marta | Grzegorz & Rafał | Karolina & Marta | Grzegorz & Rafał | Karolina & Rafał | Grażyna & Bartosz | - | Karolina & Marta (5000 zł) | Karolina & Marta | Paweł & Dariusz | Paweł & Dariusz | Małgorzata & Ernest | Karolina & Marta (10 000 zł) | Grzegorz & Rafał | Paweł & Dariusz | Patrycja & Żaneta (10 000 zł) | Patrycja & Żaneta | Małgorzata & Ernest (20 000 zł) | Grzegorz & Rafał | Grzegorz & Rafał | Karolina & Marta (5000 zł) | Karolina & Marta | Grzegorz & Rafał (10 000 zł) | Karolina & Marta | Grzegorz & Rafał |
| 3 | Karolina & Marta (5000 zł) | - | Małgorzata & Ernest | Marcin & Bartosz | Małgorzata & Ernest (5000 zł) | Karolina & Marta | Grzegorz & Marta | Patrycja & Dariusz | - | Małgorzata & Ernest | Grażyna & Filip | Grzegorz & Rafał | Marcin & Bartosz | Grzegorz & Rafał | Patrycja & Żaneta | Karolina & Marta (5000 zł) | Małgorzata & Ernest | Paweł & Dariusz | Grzegorz & Rafał | Karolina & Marta | - | Karolina & Marta | Paweł & Dariusz | Małgorzata & Ernest | Paweł & Dariusz | - | - |
| 4 | Marcin & Bartosz; Dariusz & Żaneta | - | Marcin & Bartosz | Karolina & Marta | Patrycja & Żaneta | Marcin & Bartosz | Paweł & Żaneta | Grzegorz & Marta | - | Patrycja & Żaneta | Grzegorz & Rafał | Małgorzata & Ernest | Grzegorz & Rafał | Karolina & Marta | Grzegorz & Rafał | Paweł & Dariusz | Patrycja & Żaneta | Grzegorz & Rafał | Paweł & Dariussz | Patrycja & Żaneta | - | Patrycja & Żaneta | Małgorzata & Ernest | Paweł & Dariusz | - | | |
| 5 | Grażyna & Filip | - | Paweł & Dariusz | Małgorzata & Ernest | Grażyna & Filip | Grażyna & Filip | Grażyna & Bartosz | Karolina & Rafał | - | Grażyna & Filip | Patrycja & Żaneta | Patrycja & Żaneta | Karolina & Marta | Paweł & Dariusz | Marcin & Bartosz | Patrycja & Żaneta | Grzegorz & Rafał | Marcin & Bartosz | Marcin & Bartosz | Paweł & Dariusz | - | | | | | | |
| 6 | Iwona & Reggie | - | Patrycja & Żaneta | Paweł & Dariusz | Paweł & Dariusz | Paweł & Dariusz | Marcin & Filip | Marcin & Filip | - | Paweł & Dariusz | Paweł & Dariusz | - | Patrycja & Żaneta | Marcin & Bartosz | Paweł & Dariusz | Marcin & Bartosz | Marcin & Bartosz | - | | | | | | | | | |
| 7 | - | - | Iwona & Reggie | Iwona & Reggie | Marcin & Bartosz | Patrycja & Żaneta | - | - | - | - | - | - | - | Patrycja & Żaneta | Grażyna & Filip | - | | | | | | | | | | | |
| Couple with immunity | - | | Grażyna & Filip | | - | | Małgorzata & Ernest (10 000 zł) | Małgorzata & Ernest | - | | | Grażyna & Filip | | - | | | | Karolina & Marta | | - | | Małgorzata & Ernest (10 000 zł) | - | | | | |

=== Ratings ===
| Episode | Date | Audience | Share 4+ | Share 16-49 |
|---|---|---|---|---|
| 1 | 4 March | 1 060 593 | 9.19% | |
| 2 | 11 March | 1 005 318 | 8.26% | |
| 3 | 18 March | 1 126 093 | 9.48% | |
| 4 | 25 March | | | |
| 5 | 1 April | 1 164 211 | 8.79% | |
| 6 | 8 April | | | |
| 7 | 15 April | | | |
| 8 | 22 April | | | |
| 9 | 29 April | | | |
| 10 | 6 May | | | |
| 11 | 13 May | 1 171 528 | 9.57% | |
| 12 | 20 May | | | |
| 13 | 27 May | 1 228 172 | 10.28% | 16.42% |
| Average | 2020 | 1 082 048 | 8.70% | 13.25% |
