= Peking Express =

Reality game show

- Genre: Reality
- Created by: Ludo Poppe
- Theme music composer: Brian Tyler
- Countries of origin: Belgium; Netherlands
- Original language: Dutch
- No. of seasons: 7
- No. of episodes: 76

Production
- Producer: Gert van Kerckhove
- Production location: Various
- Running time: 60 minutes

Original release
- Network: Net5 (Netherlands); Play4, Q2 (Belgium)
- Release: 14 March 2004 – 28 May 2017

Related
- The Amazing Race

Peking Express is a Dutch–Flemish reality game show that follows a series of couples as they hitchhike to or from Beijing (only in the first three seasons; the following seasons are set elsewhere around the world). The series, first broadcast on 14 March 2004, ran until 2008, and was revived in 2012 (as a sole Dutch production), and again in 2017. In the Netherlands, it was screened by Net5 and in Belgium by VT4 during its original 2000s run before moving to Q2 in 2017. The game show concept has also been sold to a number of countries around the world since 2005.

== General theme ==
The theme of the show is to demonstrate how various couples deal with the challenges and pitfalls of attempting a long-distance hitchhike to a strange city, together with all the difficulties presented by trying to communicate in a language they don't understand. Tension was added by including couples who had broken up "in real life", but were willing to work together for the sake of winning the race.

In somewhat similar fashion to The Amazing Race, couples that come in last at various checkpoints along the way are eliminated from further competition. In the second series, each of the couples was given €1 per person/per day as their stipend along the route.

== Theme music ==
The music used during the opening sequence is "Summon the Worms" from Brian Tyler's soundtrack to the 2003 miniseries Frank Herbert's Children of Dune.

== Winning couples in the international versions ==
=== Africa ===
==== Moroccan seasons ====
Dakar Fès Express	Season	Winning couple	Route	Visited countries
Dakar Fès Express	2011	Hind & Abd el Hakim	Dakar to Fez	Senegal; Mauritania; Western Sahara; Morocco
Dakar Fès Express	2012	Samid Ghilan & Younès Lazrak	Sulawesi to Manado	Indonesia

=== America ===
==== Colombian seasons ====
Asia Express	Season	Winning couple	Route	Visited countries
Asia Express	2016	Jairo & Eliseo	Hai Duong to Bangkok	Vietnam; Laos; Cambodia; Thailand

==== Mexican season ====
Abandonados Asia	Season	Winning couple	Route	Visited countries
Abandonados Asia	2016	Gabriel Hernesto Villareal & Guillermo Villareal	Hai Duong to Bangkok	Vietnam; Cambodia; Laos; Thailand
Abandonados Asia	2024	Mafer García & Amor Carlin	Chiang Rai to Kuala Lumpur	Thailand; Malaysia

=== Asia ===
==== Israeli seasons ====
פקין אקספרס - מסלול הדרקון Peking Express - The Dragon Track	Season	Host	Winning couple	Route	Visited countries
פקין אקספרס - מסלול הדרקון Peking Express - The Dragon Track	2024	Oz Zehavi	Ram Strauss & Tal Eros	Siem Reap to Bangkok	Cambodia; Laos; Thailand

=== Europe ===
==== Belgium/Netherlands seasons ====
Peking Express	Season	Winning couple	Route	Visited countries
Peking Express	2004	Rani & Hans	Moscow to Beijing	Russia; Mongolia; China
Peking Express	2005	Karla & Sophie	Beijing to Mumbai	China; Nepal; India
Peking Express	2006	Yves & Wendy	Mekong Delta to Lhasa	Vietnam; Cambodia; Laos; China
Peking Express	2006 VIP	Chimène van Oosterhout & Bart Veldkamp	Gangotri to Kochi	India
Peking Express	2007	Pascal & Miranda	Rio de Janeiro to Lima	Brazil; Bolivia; Peru
Peking Express	2008	Mark & Marlinde	Mexico City to Caracas	Mexico; Nicaragua; Venezuela
Peking Express	2012	Annebet & Quintin	Seoul to Manila	South Korea; Philippines
Peking Express	2017	Brecht & Cedric	Hạ Long to Angkor	Vietnam; Laos; Cambodia

Croatian seasons

In this version, there are only celebrity couples.

Asia Express	Season	Season's subtitle	Hosting		Winning couple	Route	Visited countries
Asia Express	Season	Season's subtitle	Main host	Co-host	Winning couple	Route	Visited countries
Asia Express	2026	Zmajeva ruta The Dragons' Route	Antonija Blaće	Ante Travizija	Upcoming	Siem Reap to Bangkok	Cambodia Laos Thailand

==== Czech seasons ====
Asia Express	Season	Winning couple	Route	Visited countries
Asia Express	2026	Vavřinec Hradilek & Tomáš Slavík	Angkor to Bangkok	Cambodia; Laos; Thailand

==== Denmark/Sweden/Norway seasons ====
Peking Express	Season	Winning couple	Route	Visited countries
Peking Express	2007	Tyra & Stefan	Moscow to Beijing	Russia; Mongolia; China

==== French seasons ====
Pékin Express	Season	Season's subtitle	Host	Winning couple	Route	Visited countries
Pékin Express	2006	La Route du Transsibérien; The Transsiberian Route	Stéphane Rotenberg	Fathi & Médi	Paris to Beijing	France; Russia; Mongolia; China
Pékin Express	2007	La Route de l'Himalaya; The Himalayan Route	Stéphane Rotenberg	Nadine & Sylvie	Beijing to Mumbai	China; Nepal; India
Pékin Express	2008	La Route des Incas; The Incas' Route	Stéphane Rotenberg	Gérard & Cédric	Rio de Janeiro to Lima	Brazil; Bolivia; Peru
Pékin Express	2009	La Route des Dragons; The Dragons' Route	Stéphane Rotenberg	Albert & Laurence	Ha Long bay to Bali	Vietnam; Cambodia; Laos; Thailand; Indonesia
Pékin Express	2010	La Route du bout du monde The Edge of the World's Route	Stéphane Rotenberg	Cécilia & Mathieu	Equator/Amazon rainforest to Ushuaia	Ecuador; Chile; Argentina
Pékin Express	2010 VIP	Duos de choc Shock duos	Stéphane Rotenberg	Taïg Khris & Chloé (season 5)	Bhatwari to Pondichery	India
Pékin Express	2011	La Route des grands fauves The Big Cats' Route	Stéphane Rotenberg	Jean-Pierre & François	Cairo to Cape Town	Egypt; Kenya; Tanzania; Lesotho; South Africa
Pékin Express	2012 All-Stars	Le Passager mystère The Mystery Passenger	Stéphane Rotenberg	Ludovic & Samuel (season 7)	Seoul to Sydney	South Korea; Philippines; Australia
Pékin Express	2013	Le Coffre maudit The Cursed Chest	Stéphane Rotenberg	Linda & Salim	Havana to Miami	Cuba; Mexico; United States
Pékin Express	2014 All-Stars	À la découverte des mondes inconnus Discovering the Unknown Worlds	Stéphane Rotenberg	Caroline (season 4) & Sabrina	Man Lawae to Colombo	Myanmar; India; Bhutan; Sri Lanka
Pékin Express	2018	La Course infernale The Infernal Race	Stéphane Rotenberg	Christina & Didier	Kuching to Tokyo	Malaysia; Philippines; Japan
Pékin Express	2019	La Route des 50 volcans The 50 Volcanoes' Route	Stéphane Rotenberg	Laeticia & Aurélie	lake Atitlan to Bogotá	Guatemala; Costa Rica; Colombia
Pékin Express	2020 All-Stars	Retour sur la Route Mythique; Return on the Mythical Route	Stéphane Rotenberg	Julie & Denis (season 9)	Moscow to Beijing	Russia; China
Pékin Express	2021	Sur les pistes de la Terre Rouge (episodes 1-3); On the Red Soil's Tracks La route des 3 continents (episodes 4-10); The 3 Continents' Route	Stéphane Rotenberg	Christophe & Claire	Entebbe to Istanbul	Uganda; Greece; Turkey
Pékin Express	2022	Sur les terres de l'Aigle Royal; On the Royal Eagle's Lands	Stéphane Rotenberg	Lucas & Nicolas	Son-Kul to Dubai	Kyrgyzstan; Uzbekistan; Jordan; United Arab Emirates
Pékin Express	2022 VIP	Duos de choc Shock duos	Stéphane Rotenberg	Inès Reg & Anaïs	Negombo to Colombo	Sri Lanka
Pékin Express	2023	Le choix secret The secret choice	Stéphane Rotenberg	Xavier & Céline	Lake Titicaca to Rio de Janeiro	Bolivia; Paraguay; Brazil
Pékin Express	2024	Sur les traces du tigre d'or In the footsteps of the golden tiger	Stéphane Rotenberg	Romain & Laura	Bali to Hanoi	Indonesia; Malaysia; Vietnam
Pékin Express	2024 All-Stars	L'épopée des Maharadjas; The epic of Maharadjas	Stéphane Rotenberg	Jean-Claude & Axel	Agra to New Delhi	India
Pékin Express	2025	La route des tribus légendaires The legendary tribes' route	Stéphane Rotenberg	Cécile & Marion	Arusha to Johannesburg	Tanzania; Mozambique; Lesotho; South Africa
Pékin Express	2025	La route des glaces The ice route	Stéphane Rotenberg	Nathalie & Charlotte	Shymkent to Astana	Kazakhstan
Pékin Express	2026	Au royaume des dragons In the kingdoms of dragons	Stéphane Rotenberg	Anna & Anthony	Kathmandu to Bangkok	Nepal; China; Thailand
Pékin Express	2027	La Route de l'Eau; The water route	Stéphane Rotenberg	TBA	TBA	TBA

==== German seasons ====
Peking Express	Season	Winning couple	Route	Visited countries
Peking Express	2005	Anja & Marc	Moscow to Beijing	Russia; Mongolia; China
Star Race	2012	Jimi & Nino	Bolinao to Manila	Philippines

==== Greek seasons ====
In this version, there are only celebrity couples.

Asia Express	Season	Winning couple	Route	Visited countries
Asia Express	2022	Konstantinos Vassalos & Fipster	Angkor to Bangkok	Cambodia; Laos; Thailand

==== Hungarian seasons ====
In this version, there are mainly Hungarian VIP couples.

Ázsia Expressz	Season	Season's subtitle	Host	Winning couple	Route	Visited countries
Ázsia Expressz	2017	A sárkány útja	Ördög Nóra	Ambrus Attila & Berki Krisztián	Ha long bay to Bangkok	Vietnam; Cambodia; Laos; Thailand
Ázsia Expressz	2019		Ördög Nóra	Horváth Gréta & Meggyes Dávid	Negombo to Chiang Mai	Sri Lanka; India; Thailand
Ázsia Expressz	2022		Ördög Nóra	Halastyák Fanni & Szlépka Armand	Wadi rum to Tashkent	Jordan; Turkey; Georgia; Uzbekistan
Ázsia Expressz	2023	Felfedezzük Amerikát!	Ördög Nóra	Kucsera Gábor & Tóth Dávid	Mineral De Pozos to Antigua Guatemala	Mexico; Guatemala
Ázsia Expressz	2024		Ördög Nóra	Béres Anett & Sáfrány Emese	Lucena to Taipei	Philippines; Taiwan
Ázsia Expressz	2025		Ördög Nóra	Bódi Hunor & Bódi Megyer	Penang to Bali	Malaysia; Indonesia
Ázsia Expressz	2026	Felfedezzük Amerikát!	Ördög Nóra	TBD	Lake Titicaca to Rio De Janeiro	Bolivia; Brazil

==== Italian seasons ====
In this version, there are mainly VIP couples.

Pechino Express	Season	Season's subtitle	Hosting		Winning couple	Route	Visited countries
Pechino Express	Season	Season's subtitle	Main host	Co-host	Winning couple	Route	Visited countries
Pechino Express	2012	Avventura in Oriente (Adventure in the East)	Emanuele Filiberto di Savoia	–	Alessandro Sampaoli & Debora Villa (Gli attori)	Haridwar to Beijing	India; Nepal; China
Pechino Express	2013	Obiettivo Bangkok (Goal: Bangkok)	Costantino della Gherardesca	–	Massimiliano Rosolino & Marco Maddaloni (Gli sportivi)	Hanoi to Bangkok	Vietnam; Cambodia; Laos; Thailand
Pechino Express	2014	Ai confini dell'Asia (At the boundaries of Asia)	Costantino della Gherardesca	–	Stefano Corti & Alessandro Onnis (I coinquilini)	Mandalay to Bali	Myanmar; Malaysia; Singapore; Indonesia
Pechino Express	2015	Il nuovo mondo (The new world)	Costantino della Gherardesca	–	Antonio Andrea Pinna & Roberto Bertolini (Gli antipodi)	Quito to Rio de Janeiro	Ecuador; Peru; Brazil
Pechino Express	2016	Le civiltà perdute (The lost civilizations)	Costantino della Gherardesca	–	Alessio Stigliano & Alessandro Tenace (I socialisti)	Bogotá to Mexico City	Colombia; Guatemala; Mexico
Pechino Express	2017	Verso il Sol Levante (Towards the Rising Sun)	Costantino della Gherardesca	–	Ema Stokholma & Valentina Pegorer (Le clubber)	Pagbilao to Tokyo	Philippines; Taiwan; Japan
Pechino Express	2018	Avventura in Africa (Adventure in Africa)	Costantino della Gherardesca	–	Patrizia Rossetti & Maria Teresa Ruta (Le signore della TV)	Tangier to Cape Town	Morocco; Tanzania; South Africa
Pechino Express	2020	Le stagioni dell'Oriente (The seasons of the East)	Costantino della Gherardesca	–	Nicole Rossi & Jennifer Poni (Le collegiali)	Ko Phra Thong to Seoul	Thailand; China; South Korea
Pechino Express	2022	La rotta dei Sultani (The sultans route)	Costantino della Gherardesca	Enzo Miccio	Victoria Cabello & Paride Vitale (I pazzeschi)	Uçhisar to Dubai	Turkey; Uzbekistan; Jordan; United Arab Emirates
Pechino Express	2023	La via delle Indie (The Indies route)	Costantino della Gherardesca	Enzo Miccio	Joe Bastianich & Andrea Belfiore (Gli italoamericani)	Mumbai to Angkor	India; Malaysia; Cambodia
Pechino Express	2024	La rotta del Dragone (The route of the Dragon)	Costantino della Gherardesca	Gianluca Colucci "Fru"	Damiano Carrara & Massimiliano Carrara (I pasticceri)	Tam Cốc to Sigiriya	Vietnam; Laos; Sri Lanka
Pechino Express	2025	Fino al tetto del mondo (To the roof of the world)	Costantino della Gherardesca	Gianluca Colucci "Fru"	Jury Chechi & Antonio Rossi (I Medagliati)	El Nido to Kathmandu	Philippines; Thailand; Nepal
Pechino Express	2026	L'estremo Oriente (The Far East)	Costantino della Gherardesca	Guido Meda, Giulia Salemi and Lillo	Chanel Totti & Filippo Laurino (I raccomandati)	Bali to Kyoto	Indonesia; China; Japan
Pechino Express	2027	La rotta dei due oceani (The route of the two oceans)	Costantino della Gherardesca	–	TBD	TBA to Rio de Janeiro	Chile; Argentina; Brazil

==== Polish seasons ====
In this version, there are only celebrity couples.

Azja Express	Season	Winning couple	Route	Visited countries
Azja Express	2016	Michał Żurawski & Ludwik Borkowski	Hai Duong to Bangkok	Vietnam; Laos; Cambodia; Thailand
Azja Express	2017	Antoni Pawlicki & Paweł Ławrynowicz	Sigiriya to Mumbai	Sri Lanka; India
Ameryka Express	2018	Aleksandra Domańska & Dawid Domański	San Antonio de Ibarra to Cusco	Ecuador; Peru
Ameryka Express	2020	Karolina Pisarek & Marta Gajewska-Komorowska	Antigua Guatemala to Cartagena	Guatemala; Colombia
Azja Express	2023	Angelika Trochonowicz & Luka Trochonowicz	Istanbul to Tashkent	Turkey; Georgia; Uzbekistan
Azja Express	2024	Jan Błachowicz & Józef Gąsienica-Gładczan	Manila to Taipei	Philippines; Taiwan
Afryka Express	2025	Edyta Zając & Michał Mikołajczak	Kilimanjaro to Nairobi	Tanzania; Kenya
Azja Express	2026	TBD	Bali to Singapore	Indonesia; Malaysia; Singapore

==== Romanian seasons ====
In this version, there are only celebrity couples.

Asia Express România	Season	Season's subtitle	Hosting		Winning couple	Route	Visited countries
Asia Express România	Season	Season's subtitle	Main host	Co-host	Winning couple	Route	Visited countries
Asia Express România	2018	Drumul dragonului (The Dragon Road)	Gina Pistol	Marius Damian	Raluka & Ana Baniciu	Hạ Long to Bangkok	Vietnam; Laos; Cambodia; Thailand
Asia Express România	2019	Drumul elefantului (The Elephant Road)	Gina Pistol	Liviu Vârciu & Andrei Ștefănescu	CRBL & Ionuț "Oase" Dongo	Negombo to Mumbai	Sri Lanka; India
Asia Express România	2020	Drumul comorilor (The Treasure Road)	Gina Pistol	Ionuț "Oase" Dongo & Marius Damian	Sorin Bontea & Răzvan Fodor	Lucena to Taipei	Philippines; Taiwan
Asia Express România	2021	Drumul împăraților (The Emperors Road)	Irina Fodor	Ionuț "Oase" Dongo & Marius Damian	Mihai Petre & Elwira Petre	Edirne to Jerusalem	Turkey; Georgia; Jordan; Israel
America Express România	2023	Drumul aurului (The Golden Road)	Irina Fodor	Ionuț "Oase" Dongo & Marius Damian	Cătălin Bordea & Nelu Cortea	Querétaro to Cartagena	Mexico; Guatemala; Colombia
America Express România	2023	Drumul soarelui (The Sun Road)	Irina Fodor	Marius Damian	Laura Giurcanu & Sânziana Negru	Medellín to Buenos Aires	Colombia; Ecuador; Argentina
Asia Express România	2024	Drumul zeilor (The Gods Road)	Irina Fodor	Marius Damian	Nicolai Tand & Sorin Brotnei	Chiang Rai to Bali	Thailand; Malaysia; Indonesia
Asia Express România	2025	Drumul eroilor (The Heroes Road)	Irina Fodor	Marius Damian	Gabriel Tamaș & Dan Alexa	Atulayan Island to Seoul	Philippines; Vietnam; South Korea
Asia Express România	2026	Drumul mătăsii (The Silk Road)	Irina Fodor	Marius Damian	Gabriel Torje & Alin Alexuc-Ciurariu	Bukhara to Shanghai	Uzbekistan; China

==== Spanish seasons ====
Pekín Express	Season	Season's subtitle	Winning couple	Route	Visited countries
Pekín Express	2008	La Ruta del Transiberiano; The Trans-Siberian Route	Fernando & María (couple in crisis)	Pskov to Beijing	Russia; Mongolia; China
Pekín Express	2009	La Ruta del Himalaya; The Himalayan Route	Carmela & Antonio (rural friends)	Beijing to Mumbai	China; Nepal; India
Pekín Express	2010	La Ruta del Dragón; The Route of the Dragon	Sandra & Belinda (sisters)	Hanoi to Bali	Vietnam; Cambodia; Laos; Thailand; Indonesia
Pekín Express	2011	Aventura en África; Adventure in Africa	Mar & Vanesa (sisters)	Great Rift Valley, Kenya to Cape Town	Kenya; Tanzania; South Africa
Pekín Express	2015	La Ruta de los Mil Templos; The Route of the Thousand Temples	Ángel & Bea (siblings-in-law)	Mandalay to Singapore	Myanmar; Malaysia; Singapore
Pekín Express	2016	La Ruta de los Elefantes; The Route of the Elephants	Matías & Nabil (geek cousins)	Anuradhapura to Mumbai	Sri Lanka; India
Pekín Express	2024	Objetivo Angkor; Objective Angkor	Alba & Alex (siblings-in-law)	Cát Bà Island to Angkor	Vietnam; Laos; Cambodia

== International versions ==
A German version was shown in 2005. The concept has also been sold to Scandinavia where it was broadcast for the first time in the autumn of 2007. The Scandinavian version is shown on Kanal 5 in Sweden, TVNorge in Norway and Kanal 5 in Denmark.

A French version named Pékin Express is screened by M6, with twenty-two season, as of 2026. It can be seen on TV5 outside France. In Spain, the first four seasons of local version Pekín Express aired on Cuatro from 2008 to 2011; Atresmedia acquired the rights in 2015 and has produced two seasons since. An Italian version has been produced since 2012 by RAI and shown on Rai 2 successfully until 2020, when it passed on Sky Uno. In Poland, the series has been broadcast on TVN since 2016 and was known for its first two seasons, which were set in Asia, as Azja Express. From season 3 onwards, it has been known as Ameryka Express, with its production location changing to America; a fourth season premiered in spring 2020. In Romania, the series has aired successfully on Antena 1 since 2018 as Asia Express România for its first four seasons, with the next two seasons in 2023 being titled America Express România, following the changing of its production location into Americas, and then returning to Asia since 2024. In Greece, the series has started airing on Star Channel as Asia Express in fall 2022.

Country	Name	Channel	Route	Host	Website
Belgium (Dutch); Netherlands	Peking Express	Net5; VT4 (2004–2008); Q2 (2017)	2004: Moscow – Beijing; 2005: Peking – Mumbai; 2006: Rach Gia – Lhasa; 2006: Gangotri – Kochi; 2007: Rio de Janeiro – Lima; 2008: Mexico City – Caracas; 2012: Seoul – Manila; 2017: Hạ Long – Angkor	Ernst-Paul Hasselbach (2004); Art Rooijakkers and Roos Van Acker (2005–2008); Sol Wortelboer (2012); Sean Dhondt and Rik van de Westelaken (2017)	Official website Netherlands; Official website Belgium
Belgium (French)	Pékin Express	RTL	2012: Wori – Manado	Michel De Maegd	Official website
Colombia	Asia Express	Caracol Televisión	2016: Hanoi – Bangkok	Ivan Lalinde	Official website
Croatia	Asia Express: Zmajeva ruta	RTL	2026: Siem Reap – Bangkok	Antonija Blaće; Ante Travizija	TBA
Czechia	Asia Express	Prima	2026: Angkor – Bangkok; 2027: TBA – TBA	Jakub Štáfek; Vašek Matějovský	Official website
Denmark; Sweden; Norway	Peking Express	TVNorge; Kanal 5	2007: Moscow – Beijing	Thomas Mygind; Martin Björk; Synnøve Skarbø	Official website Norway
France; Belgium; Switzerland; Monaco	Pékin Express	M6	2006: Paris – Pskov – Beijing; 2007: Beijing – Mumbai; 2008: Rio de Janeiro – Lima; 2009: Ha Long Bay – Bali; 2010: Nueva Loja – Ushuaia; 2010: Gangotri – Pondicherry; 2011: Cairo – Cape Town; 2012: Seoul – Sydney; 2013: Habana – Miami; 2014: Lashio – Colombo; 2018: Kuching – Tokyo; 2019: lake Atitlan – Bogotá; 2020: Moscow – Beijing; 2021: Entebbe – Istanbul; 2022: Son-Kul – Dubai; 2022: Negombo – Colombo; 2023: La Paz – Rio de Janeiro; 2024: Bali – Hanoi; 2024: Agra – Delhi; 2025: Arusha – Johannesburg; 2025: Shymkent – Astana; 2026: Kathmandu – Bangkok	Stéphane Rotenberg	Official website
Germany	Peking Express; Star Race	RTL	2005: Moscow – Beijing; 2012: Bolinao – Manila	Patrice Bouédibéla; Roberta Brandao	
Greece	Asia Express	Star	2022: Angkor – Bangkok	Petros Polychronidis	Official website
Hungary	Ázsia Expressz	TV2	2017: Hải Dương – Bangkok; 2019: Negombo – Chiang Mai; 2022: Aqaba – Tashkent; 2023: Mexico City – Antigua Guatemala; 2024: Lucena – Taipei; 2025: Penang – Bali; 2026: La Paz – Rio de Janeiro	Nóra Ördög	Official website
Israel	פקין אקספרס - מסלול הדרקון; Peking Express - The Dragon Road	Channel 13	2024: Siem Reap – Bangkok	Oz Zehavi	האתר הרשמי של פקין אקספרס
Italy	Pechino Express	Rai 2 (2012–2020); Sky Uno, TV8 (2022–)	2012: Haridwar – Beijing; 2013: Hanoi – Bangkok; 2014: Mandalay – Bali; 2015: Quito – Rio de Janeiro; 2016: Bogotá – Mexico City; 2017: Pagbilao – Tokyo; 2018: Tangier – Cape Town; 2020: Ko Phra Thong – Seoul; 2022: Uçhisar – Dubai; 2023: Mumbai – Angkor; 2024: Tam Cốc – Sigiriya; 2025: El Nido – Kathmandu; 2026: Bali - Kyoto; 2027: TBA – Rio de Janeiro	Emanuele Filiberto di Savoia (2012); Costantino della Gherardesca (2013–); Enzo Miccio (2022–2023); Gianluca "Fru" Colucci (2024–)	Official website
Mexico	Abandonados Asia	Azteca 7 Azteca Uno	2016: Hanoi – Bangkok; 2024: Chiang Rai – Kuala Lumpur	Paola Nuñez	Official website
Morocco	Dakar Fès Express	2M	2011: Dakar – Fez; 2012: Wori – Manado	Hicham Mesrar	Official website
Poland	Azja Express (1–2, 5–6, 8); Ameryka Express (3–4); Afryka Express (7)	TVN	2016: Hanoi – Bangkok; 2017: Sigiriya – Mumbai; 2018: San Antonio de Ibarra – Cusco; 2020: Antigua – Cartagena; 2023: Istanbul – Tashkent; 2024: Lucena – Taipei; 2025: Kilimanjaro – Nairobi; 2026: Bali – Singapore	Agnieszka Woźniak-Starak (2016–2018); Daria Ładocha (2020, 2023–2024); Izabela Krzan (2025)	Official website
Portugal	A Grande Aventura	TVI	2012: Manado Tua – Manado	Fernanda Serrano	Official website
Romania	Asia Express România (1–4, 7–); America Express România (5–6)	Antena 1	2018: Hạ Long – Bangkok; 2019: Negombo – Mumbai; 2020: Lucena – Taipei; 2021: Edirne – Jerusalem; 2023: Querétaro City – Cartagena; 2023: Medellín – Buenos Aires; 2024: Chiang Rai – Bali; 2025: Atulayan Island – Seoul; 2026: Bukhara – Shanghai	Gina Pistol (2018–2020); Marius Damian (2018, 2020–); Liviu Vârciu (2019); Andrei Ștefănescu (2019); Ionuț "Oase" Dongo (2020–2023); Irina Fodor (2021–)	Official website
Spain	Pekín Express	Cuatro (2008–2011); Antena 3 (2015) laSexta (2016); Max (2024)	2008: Pskov – Beijing; 2009: Beijing – Mumbai; 2010: Hanoi – Bali; 2011: Rift Valley – Cape Town; 2015: Mandalay – Singapore; 2016: Anuradhapura – Mumbai; 2024: Cát Bà Island – Angkor	Paula Vázquez (2008); Raquel Sánchez Silva (2009–2010); Jesús Vázquez (2011); Cristina Pedroche (2015–2016); Miguel Ángel Muñoz (2024)	Official website (Cuatro); Official website (Antena 3); Official website (laSexta)
