= Pascal Brodnicki =

Polish-French cook

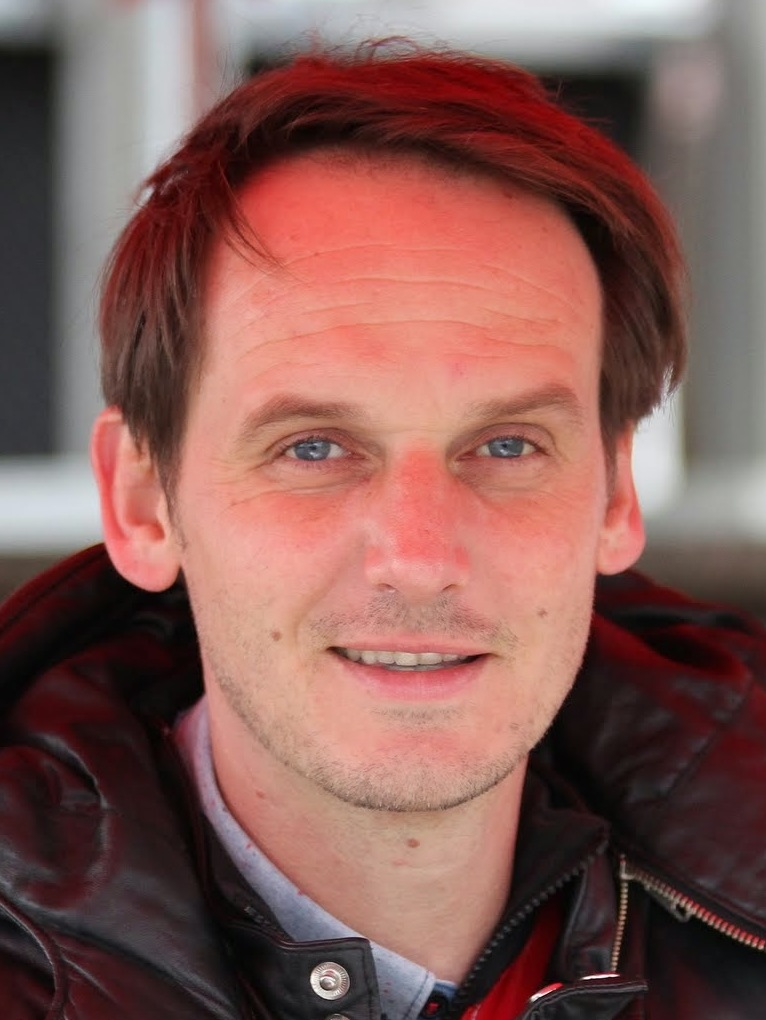
Pascal Brodnicki

Pascal Brodnicki (born. 5 September 1976 in France) is a Polish-French cook.

Born in France, he worked in many famous restaurants (Chelsea Hotel in London, or Les Pyrénées in France).

He currently lives in Poland. He hosts a TV program "Pascal: Po prostu gotuj! in TVN. He released two books: Po prostu gotuj and Po prostu mi to ugotuj.
