= Wori =

Coordinates: 1°36′N 124°51′E

Wori is an administrative district (kecamatan) in North Minahasa Regency of North Sulawesi Province, Indonesia. It has a land area of 87.14 km^{2} and includes the offshore islands of Mantehage and Nain in the Celebes Sea as well as the northwest coast districts of North Minahasa. Mantehage and Nain Islands form part of the Bunaken National Park. The population was 17,980 at the 2010 Census and 20,749 at the 2020 Census; as of mid 2022, the estimated population of Wori District was 21,414 people, of whom 17,298 inhabited the Minahasan coastal districts, 1,529 were on Mantehage Island and 2,587 on Nain Island. The administrative centre is in the town of Wori. The district is composed of 20 villages, all rated as desa, which share the postcode of 95376.

Kode Wilayah	Name of Desa	Area in sq. km	Pop'n mid 2022 Estimate
71.06.04.2001	Tiwoho	6.34	1,450
71.06.04.2002	Wori	5.50	3,351
71.06.04.2003	Kima Bajo	3.75	1,055
71.06.04.2004	Talawaan Banlik	8.80	1,174
71.06.04.2005	Talawaan Atas	3.26	865
71.06.04.2006	Budo	3.23	912
71.06.04.2007	Darunu	5.80	834
71.06.04.2013	Kulu	4.53	1,129
71.06.04.2014	Bulu	2.44	897
71.06.04.2015	Lansa	6.60	1,484
71.06.04.2016	Lantung	4.00	802
71.06.04.2017	Ponto	1.40	695
71.06.04.2018	Minaesa	1.50	1,636
71.06.04.2010	Mantehage I / Buhias	7.10	639
71.06.04.2008	Mantehage III / Tinongko	3.30	520
71.06.04.2011	Mantehage / Bango	3.30	467
71.06.04.2012	Mantehage II / Tangkasi	5.14	371
71.06.04.2009	Nain	2.15	1,636
71.06.04.2019	Nain Tatampi	1.50	448
71.06.04.2020	Nain Satu	7.50	503
71.06.04	Totals	87.14	21,414^{(a)}

Note: (a) comprising 10,959 males and 10,455 females.

- Budo
- Bulo
- Darunu
- Kima Bajo
- Kulu
- Lansa
- Lantung
- Mantehage Bango
- Mantehage Buhias
- Mantehage Tangkas
- Mantehage Tinongko
- Minaesa
- Nain
- Ponto
- Talawaan Atas
- Talawaan Bantik
- Tiwoho
- Wori
