= Ugotowani =

- Genre: Cooking
- Country of origin: Poland
- Original language: Polish
- No. of series: 10
- No. of episodes: 238

Production
- Running time: Season 1-6: 45 minutes Season 7-8: 30 minutes 45 minutes (Best Of); Season 9-13: 45 minutes

Original release
- Network: TVN
- Release: 3 October 2010 – 6 May 2018
- Release: 1 March – 17 May 2023

Ugotowani is a TVN television programme shown in Poland. It was the Polish version of the Channel 4's Come Dine with Me. The show has four amateur chefs competing against each other hosting a dinner party for the other contestants. Each competitor then rates the host's performance with the winner winning a 5,000 zł cash prize. An element of comedy is added to the show by a comedian, who provides a dry and "bitingly sarcastic" narration.

== Series summary ==
Series	Episodes	Premiere	Finale	Aired
One	10	3 October 2010	5 December 2010	Sunday 5:00 pm
Two	15	11 September 2011	18 December 2011	Sunday 6:00 pm
Three	12	9 September 2012	25 November 2012	Sunday 6:00 pm
Four	12	24 February 2013	19 May 2013	Sunday 6:00 pm
Five	15	8 September 2013	15 December 2013	Sunday 6:00 p.m.
Six	12	2 March 2014	25 May 2014	Sunday 6:00 pm
Seven	52	1 September 2014	27 November 2014	Monday–Thursday 8:45 pm and Sunday 6:00 pm
Eight	64	9 February 2015	28 May 2015	Monday–Thursday 8:45 pm and Sunday 6:00 pm
Nine	13	6 September 2015	29 November 2015	Sunday 6:00 pm
Ten	12	21 February 2016	15 May 2016	Sunday 6:00 pm
Eleven	12	11 September 2016	27 November 2016	Sunday 6:00 pm
Twelve	10	19 February 2017	30 April 2017	Sunday 6:00 pm

== Series Guide ==
=== Series 1: Autumn 2010 - Sunday 5:00 pm ===
Episodes	Premiered	Location	Viewers	Share (4+)	Share (16-49)
1	3 October 2010	Warsaw	1 167 279	10,64%	13,87%
2	10 October 2010	Warsaw	1 212 764	11,07%	14,23%
3	17 October 2010	Poznań	1 248 782	10,09%	14,11%
4	24 October 2010	Wrocław	1 674 378	13,19%	18,22%
5	31 October 2010	Warsaw	1 422 052	11,27%	14,85%
6	7 November 2010	Silesia	1 910 453	13,07%	17,00%
7	14 November 2010	Szczecin	1 750 095	13,29%	18,75%
8	21 November 2010	Kraków	1 898 565	14,55%	19,49%
9	28 November 2010	Łódź	1 935 253	13,71%	17,85%
10	5 December 2010	Kraków	1 998 587	14,23%	18,49%
Average	2010	-	1 621 677	12,61%	16,80%

=== Series 2: Autumn 2011 - Sunday 6.00 p.m. ===
Episodes	Premiered	Location	Viewers	Share (4+)	Share (16-49)
1	11 September 2011	Warsaw	1 569 505	16,05%	21,63%
2	18 September 2011	Lublin	1 807 643	16,27%	19,53%
3	25 September 2011	Warsaw	2 007 660	17,64%	22,53%
4	2 October 2011	Poznań			
5	9 October 2011	Kraków			
6	16 October 2011	Opole			
7	23 October 2011	Łódź			
8	30 October 2011	Pomerania			
9	6 November 2011	Wrocław			
10	13 November 2011	Bydgoszcz	2 627 503	17,62%	22,43%
11	20 November 2011	Silesia			
12	27 November 2011	Zielona Góra	2 741 776	19,04%	26,65%
13	4 December 2011	Warsaw	2 473 941	16,47%	22,77%
14	11 December 2011	Łódź	2 942 170	19,88%	27,83%
15	18 December 2011	Kraków	2 614 584	17,23%	22,43%
Average	2011	-	2 280 403	16,82%	22,25%

=== Series 3: Autumn 2012 - Sunday 6.00 p.m. ===
Episodes	Premiered	Location	Viewers	Share (4+)	Share (16-49)
1	9 September 2012	Poznań			
2	16 September 2012	Warsaw			
3	23 September 2012	Rzeszów			
4	30 September 2012	Warsaw			
5	7 October 2012	Szczecin			
6	14 October 2012	Częstochowa			
7	21 October 2012	Silesia			
8	28 October 2012	Podhale			
9	4 November 2012	Tricity			
10	11 November 2012	Kraków			
11	18 November 2012	Wrocław			
12	25 November 2012	Warsaw			
Average	2012	-			

=== Series 4: Spring 2013 - Sunday 6.00 p.m. ===
Episodes	Premiered	Location	Viewers	Share (4+)	Share (16-49)
1	24 February 2013	Kraków			21,27%
2	3 March 2013	Białystok	2 858 591	18,91%	25,20%
3	10 March 2013	Poznań			
4	17 March 2013	Warsaw; Celebrity Special; Anna Wendzikowska; Stefano Terrazzino; Maciej Zień; Małgorzata Potocka	2 753 319	18,76%	26,87%
5	24 March 2013	Łódź	2 669 758	18,44%	25,66%
6	7 April 2013	Wrocław			24,13%
7	14 April 2013	Toruń			26,23%
8	21 April 2013	Warsaw			
9	28 April 2013	Tricity			
10	5 May 2013	Warsaw			
11	12 May 2013	Olsztyn			
12	19 May 2013	London			
Average	Spring 2013	-	2 340 893	17,77%	23,94%

=== Series 5: Autumn 2013 - Sunday 6.00 p.m. ===
Episodes	Premiered	Location	Viewers	Share (4+)	Share (16-49)
1	8 September 2013	Warsaw	1 959 407	19,30%	29,10%
2	15 September 2013	Kraków	2 424 968	20,00%	26,80%
3	22 September 2013	Koszalin	2 673 259	20,50%	26,90%
4	29 September 2013	Szczecin	2 182 908	16,80%	22,50%
5	6 October 2013	Cieszyn	2 345 859	17,30%	22,30%
6	13 October 2013	Bydgoszcz	2 436 235	18,20%	25,70%
7	20 October 2013	Warsaw	1 821 470	13,50%	16,70%
8	27 October 2013	Lublin	2 305 557	16,10%	21,70%
9	3 November 2013	Warsaw	2 664 950	16,90%	20,90%
10	10 November 2013	Celebrity Special; Michał Szpak; Rafał Brzozowski; Marta Wierzbicka; Natalia Nguyen	2 525 324	17,60%	24,70%
11	17 November 2013	Kielce	2 542 127	17,70%	23,90%
12	24 November 2013	Tarnów	3 213 505	20,60%	25,80%
13	1 December 2013	Toruń	2 635 960	17,40%	23,50%
14	8 December 2013	Zielona Góra	2 507 543	17,00%	21,70%
15	15 December 2013	Warsaw	2 613 998	16,80%	21,90%
Average	Autoumn	2013	2 457 993	17,68%	23,45%

=== Series 6: Spring 2014 - Sunday 6.00 p.m. ===
Episodes	Premiered	Location	Viewers	Share (4+)	Share (16-49)
1	2 March 2014	Warsaw			
2	9 March 2014	Częstochowa			
3	16 March 2014	Bielsko-Biała			
4	23 March 2014	Łódź			19.92%
5	30 March 2014	Warsaw			
6	6 April 2014	Warsaw			
7	13 April 2014	Białystok			
8	20 April 2014	Wrocław			
9	4 May 2014	Jelenia Góra			
10	11 May 2014	Radom			22.35%
11	18 May 2014	Grudziądz			
12	25 May 2014	Warsaw			

=== Series 7: Autumn 2014 - Monday-Thursday 8:50 p.m & Sunday 5:00 p.m/6:00 p.m (Best Of) ===
Episodes	Premiered	Location	Viewers	Share (4+)	Share (16-49)
1-5	1–7 September 2014	Poznań	1 639 647	9,21 %	12,63 %
6-10	8–14 September 2014	Warsaw			
11-15	15–21 September 2014	Lublin			
16-20	22–28 September 2014	Warsaw			
21-25	29 September–5 October 2014	Opole			
26-30	6–12 October 2014	Warsaw			
31-35	13–19 October 2014	Tricity			
36-40	20–26 October 2014	Szczecin			
41-45	27 October–2 November 2014	Masuria			
46-50	3–9 November 2014	Celebrity Special; Filip Chajzer; Otylia Jędrzejczak; Michał Witkowski; Kasia Klich			
51-55	10–16 November 2014	Silesia			
56-60	17–23 November 2014	Łódź			
61-65	24–29 November 2014	Warsaw			

=== Series 8: Spring 2015 - Monday-Thursday 8:50 p.m & Sunday 5:00 p.m/6:00 p.m (Best Of) ===
Episodes	Premiered	Location	Viewers	Share (4+)	Share (16-49)
1 - 5	9–15 February 2015	Bielsko-Biała	1 189 800	7,27 %	9,63 %
6 - 10	16–22 February 2015	"MasterChef Contestant" Special - Tricity; Monika Goździalska; Diana Volonkhova; Charles Daigneault; Daniel Hucik			
11 - 15	23 February - 1 March 2015	Poznań			
16 - 20	2–8 March 2015	Warsaw			
21 - 25	9–15 March 2015	Wrocław			
26 - 30	16–22 March 2015	Kraków			
31 - 35	23–29 March 2015	"Types of Diets" Special - Warsaw; Alicja Głąbicka; Maciej Dejnacki; Ewa Trusiewicz; Piotr Koluch			
36 - 40	30 March - 5 April 2015	Rzeszów			
41 - 45	6–12 April 2015	Zielona Góra			
46 - 50	13–19 April 2015	Wrocław			
51 - 55	20–26 April 2015	Celebrity Special - Warsaw; Magda Steczkowska; Kazimiera Szczuka; Jakub "Jacob" Bartnik; Piotr Najsztub			
56 - 60	27 April - 3 May 2015	Silesia			
61 - 65	4–10 May 2015	"Sport Star" Special - Warsaw; Tomasz Puzon; Ewa Brodnicka; Tomasz Wojda; Aniela Bogusz			
66 - 70	11–17 May 2015	Gorzów Wielkopolski			
71 - 75	18–24 May 2015	Bydgoszcz			
76 - 80	25–31 May 2015	Białystok			
