= 19+ =

Polish television series

- Genre: paradocumentary
- Theme music composer: Szparagi
- Country of origin: Poland
- Original language: Polish
- No. of seasons: 11
- No. of episodes: 731

Production
- Running time: 22 minutes

Original release
- Network: TVN
- Release: 7 November 2016 – 23 May 2022

19+ is a Polish paradocumentary series airing on TVN. It premiered on 7 November 2016. The series focused on a group of students that has just graduated from secondary school and are embarking on their adult lives. The main character, Mela, has started up a videoblog about her life and those of her friends, and the series shows her and others recording videos, as well as scenes from their unrecorded lives.

== Cast ==
- Małgorzata Heretyk as Melania „Mela” (Melanie) Trzeciak
- Anna Zuch as Lena Gawrońska
- Żaneta Kussa as Katarzyna Czerkawska (Kasia)
- Michał Wilk as Rafał Malewicz
- Marcin Dąbrowski as Oskar (Oscar) Prus
- Marcel Opaliński as Kamil Pawlak
- Diana Dudlińska as Lucyna Kruczek (Lucy, Greenpeace)
- Kamil Sobczyk as Sebastian Szumiec (Seba)
- Julia Drybczewska as Milena Dobek
- Paulina Łabuda as Alicja „Ala” Motyl (Alice Butterfly)
- Konrad Żygadło as Stanisław Matusiak (Staszek)
- Wiktor Durda as Kacper Borek
- Natalia Koszyk as Jolanta Wysocka (Jola)
- Beniamin Andrzejewski as Ireneusz Sobczak (Irek)
- Dominika Przywara as Magdalena Staszak
- Ernest Musiał as Arkadiusz Brzozowski
- Malwina Roczniok as Iwona Małkowska (Mela's enemy)
- Justyna Grzybowska as Zuzanna Jurewicz/Matylda Bogusz
- Daniel Tecław as Bruno Wasiak
- Marcelina Ziętek as Kaja Jarosik
- Patryk Dębosz as Paweł Kwapiński
- Izabela Maciuszek as Marta Prus (Oscar's mother)
- Renata Furdyna Makowska as Aneta Pawlak Czerkawska) (Kasia's mother)
- Piotr Urbaniak as Mariusz Pawlak (Kamil's father)
- Karolina Strauss as Ela Tkaczyk
- Tomasz Hajduk as Szczepan Kapusta („Frodo”)
- Grzegorz Widera as Marek Motyl (Ala's father)
- Weronika Witek as Sara Rogalska
- Tymoteusz Kutz as Filip Sagaj
- Magdalena Sonik as Julia Malewicz (daughter of Kasia and Rafał, child)
- Marek Ulman as Gabriel Herman
- Jerzy Cisak as Stanisław Trzeciak (Mela's father)
- Anita Nissenbaum as Ewa Trzeciak (Mela's mother)
- Magdalena Król as Monika Różycka
- Kacper Kosiba as Bartek Trzeciak (Mela's brother)
- Kinga Brodecka as Pola Kaszuba
- Andrzej Skorupa as Miłosz Dusak
- Gabriela Bukowska as Magdalena Wolska
- Hubert Dyl as Krzysztof Markowski („Prezes”)
- Karol Szczepanik as Marcel Piekarski
- Łukasz Pawlak as Jan Król
- Aneta Kołodziejek jako Ala's mother
- Katarzyna Piotrowska-Ornatkiewicz as Marzena Gawrońska (Lena's mother)
- Alicja Wróbel as Alicja Pawlak (Kamil's mother)
- Jacek Januchowski as Tadeusz Kruczek (Lucy's father)
- Danuta Bukowska as Magdalena's mother
- Aneta Jarosz as Barbara Szumiec (Sebastian's mother)
- Zofia Rusek as Zofia Sobczak (Irek's grandmother)
- Marek Wolny as Marian Szumiec (Sebastian's father)
- Marcin Przybyłek as Aleksander (Kasia's father)
- Edyta Tarchała as mother of Arkadiusz
- Mirosław Skibiński as Tomasz Markowski (father of Krzysztof)
