= Taniec z gwiazdami season 23 =

Taniec z gwiazdami
- Season 23
- Hosted by: Krzysztof Ibisz; Paulina Sykut-Jeżyna
- Judges: Andrzej Grabowski; Iwona Pavlović; Michał Malitowski
- Celebrity winner: Damian Kordas
- Professional winner: Janja Lesar
- No. of episodes: 10

Release
- Original network: Polsat
- Original release: 13 September – 22 November 2019

Season chronology
- ← Previous; Season 22 Next → Season 24

The 23rd season of Taniec z gwiazdami, the Polish edition of Dancing with the Stars, started on 13 September 2019. This is the tenth season aired on Polsat. Paulina Sykut-Jeżyna and Krzysztof Ibisz returned as host and Iwona Pavlović, Michał Malitowski and Andrzej Grabowski returned as judges. Ola Jordan did not return as a judge.

On 22 November, Damian Kordas and his partner Janja Lesar were crowned the champions.

== Couples ==
Celebrity	Notability (Known for)	Professional partner	Status
Reni Jusis	Singer-songwriter	Misha Steciuk	Eliminated 1st on 13 September 2019
Rafał Szatan	Actor, singer and Barbara Kurdej-Szatan's husband	Lenka Klimentová	Eliminated 2nd on 20 September 2019
Joanna Lazer	Red Lips singer	Rafał Maserak	Eliminated 3rd on 27 September 2019
Adam Małczyk	Comedian	Hanna Żudziewicz	Eliminated 4th on 4 October 2019
Akop Szostak	Bodybuilder, MMA fighter and personal trainer	Sara Janicka	Eliminated 5th on 11 October 2019
Ola Kot	Eska TV presenter	Tomasz Barański	Eliminated 6th on 25 October 2019
Monika Miller	Photomodel and Leszek Miller's granddaughter	Jan Kliment	Eliminated 7th on 8 November 2019
Magda Bereda	Singer and influencer	Kamil Kuroczko	Eliminated 8th on 8 November 2019
Sandra Kubicka	Model	Adam Adamonis (Weeks 1–5, 7); Wojciech Jeschke (Week 6, 8–9)	Third Place on 15 November 2019
Barbara Kurdej-Szatan	Actress, singer and television presenter	Jacek Jeschke	Runners-up on 22 November 2019
Damian Kordas	Cook and MasterChef winner	Janja Lesar	Winners on 22 November 2019

== Scores ==
Couple	Place	1	2	3	4	5	6	7	6+7	8		9		10
Damian & Janja	1	21	22	23	27†	30†	24+3=27	29†	56	30†	+28=58†	29+29=58	—	29+27+30=86
Barbara & Jacek	2	29†	22	27†	26	30†	27+3=30†	26	56	27	+28=55	30+30=60†	+30=90†	27+29+30=86
Sandra & Adam / Wojciech	3	23	27†	21	26	28	28	28+1=29†	57†	30†	+24=54	27+30=57‡	+30=87‡	
Magda & Kamil	4	12‡	12‡	12‡	11‡	17‡	18‡	15‡	33‡	18‡	+19=37‡			
Monika & Jan	5	15	16	22	17	21	19	23+1=24	43	18‡				
Ola & Tomasz	6	19	21	20	22	20	17+3=20	22+1=23	43					
Akop & Sara	7	13	15	16	17	18+3=21								
Adam & Hanna	8	27	24	23	17									
Joanna & Rafał	9	23	26	21										
Rafał & Lenka	10	19	17											
Reni & Misha	11	22												

Red numbers indicate the lowest score for each week.
Green numbers indicate the highest score for each week.
indicates the couple eliminated that week.
indicates the returning couple that finished in the bottom two or three.
indicates the couple saved from elimination by immunity.
indicates the winning couple.
indicates the runner-up.
indicates the couple in third place.

== Average score chart ==
This table only counts for dances scored on a 30-points scale.

Rank by average	Place	Couple	Total points	Number of dances	Average
1	2	Barbara & Jacek	418	15	27.9
2	1	Damian & Janja	378	14	27.0
3	3	Sandra & Adam / Wojciech	322	12	26.8
4	9	Joanna & Rafał	70	3	23.3
5	8	Adam & Hanna	91	4	22.8
6	11	Reni & Misha	22	1	22.0
7	6	Ola & Tomasz	141	7	20.1
8	5	Monika & Jan	151	8	18.9
9	10	Rafał & Lenka	36	2	18.0
10	7	Akop & Sara	79	5	15.8
11	4	Magda & Kamil	134	9	14.9

== Highest and lowest scoring performances ==
The best and worst performances in each dance according to the judges' 30-point scale:

Dance	Best dancer(s)	Highest score	Worst dancer(s)	Lowest score
Jive	Sandra Kubicka	30	Magda Bereda	11
Cha-cha-cha	Barbara Kurdej-Szatan	30	Magda Bereda	12
Waltz	Damian Kordas	28	Rafał Szatan	19
Tango	Sandra Kubicka; Barbara Kurdej-Szatan	30	Monika Miller	16
Foxtrot	Barbara Kurdej-Szatan	27	Akop Szostak	18
Viennese Waltz	Barbara Kurdej-Szatan	30	Akop Szostak	15
Quickstep	Damian Kordas	30	Magda Bereda	12
Rumba	Barbara Kurdej-Szatan	27	Magda Bereda	12
Paso Doble	Damian Kordas	30	Akop Szostak	17
Samba	Damian Kordas	29	Ola Kot	22
Contemporary	Sandra Kubicka	30	Sandra Kubicka	28
Charleston	Barbara Kurdej-Szatan	30	Magda Bereda	15
Salsa	Sandra Kubicka	28		
Bollywood	Magda Bereda	19		
Showdance	Barbara Kurdej-Szatan; Damian Kordas	30		

== Couples' highest and lowest scoring dances ==
According to the 30-point scale:

Couples	Highest scoring dance(s)	Lowest scoring dance(s)
Damian & Janja	Quickstep, Paso Doble, Showdance (30)	Jive (21)
Barbara & Jacek	Viennese Waltz, Cha-cha-cha, Charleston, Tango, Showdance (30)	Cha-cha-cha (22)
Sandra & Adam / Wojciech	Contemporary, Jive, Tango (30)	Paso Doble (21)
Magda & Kamil	Bollywood (19)	Jive (11)
Monika & Jan	Paso Doble (23)	Cha-cha-cha (15)
Ola & Tomasz	Waltz, Samba (22)	Quickstep (17)
Akop & Sara	Foxtrot (18)	Cha-cha-cha (13)
Adam & Hanna	Tango (27)	Cha-cha-cha (17)
Joanna & Rafał	Jive (26)	Cha-cha-cha (21)
Rafał & Lenka	Waltz (19)	Jive (17)
Reni & Misha	Waltz (22)	Waltz (22)

== Weekly scores ==
Unless indicated otherwise, individual judges scores in the charts below (given in parentheses) are listed in this order from left to right: Andrzej Grabowski, Iwona Pavlović and Michał Malitowski.

=== Week 1: Season Premiere ===
Running order

Couple	Score	Dance	Music	Result
Damian & Janja	21 (8,6,7)	Jive	"Cheap Thrills"—Sia	Safe
Monika & Jan	15 (7,4,4)	Cha-cha-cha	"I Will Survive"—Gloria Gaynor	Safe
Rafał & Lenka	19 (8,6,5)	Waltz	"Hello"—Lionel Richie	Safe
Magda & Kamil	12 (6,3,3)	Cha-cha-cha	"Za krokiem krok"—Cleo	Safe
Joanna & Rafał	23 (9,8,6)	Waltz	"Hero"—Mariah Carey	Safe
Ola & Tomasz	19 (8,5,6)	Jive	"Man! I Feel Like A Woman!"—Shania Twain	Safe
Adam & Hanna	27 (10,9,8)	Tango	"Hernando's Hideaway"—Archie Bleyer	Safe
Sandra & Adam	23 (9,7,7)	Cha-cha-cha	"Let's Get Loud"—Jennifer Lopez	Safe
Reni & Misza	22 (9,7,6)	Waltz	"When We Were Young"—Adele	Eliminated
Akop & Sara	13 (6,3,4)	Cha-cha-cha	"Początek"—Męskie Granie Orkiestra	Safe
Barbara & Jacek	29 (10,10,9)	Tango	"Love Me like You Do"—Ellie Goulding	Safe

=== Week 2 ===
Running order

Couple	Score	Dance	Music	Result
Rafał & Lenka	17 (7,5,5)	Jive	"It's Not Unusual"—Tom Jones	Eliminated
Ola & Tomasz	21 (9,6,6)	Foxtrot	"Somethin' Stupid"—Frank Sinatra and Nancy Sinatra	Safe
Akop & Sara	15 (7,4,4)	Viennese Waltz	"Ochi chyornye"—Violetta Villas	Safe
Barbara & Jacek	22 (9,7,6)	Cha-cha-cha	"Sugar"—Maroon 5	Safe
Magda & Kamil	12 (6,3,3)	Quickstep	"Despacito"—Luis Fonsi & Daddy Yankee	Safe
Adam & Hanna	24 (9,8,7)	Jive	"La Bamba"—Ritchie Valens	Safe
Monika & Jan	16 (7,4,5)	Tango	"Try"—Pink	Safe
Joanna & Rafał	26 (9,9,8)	Jive	"I'm So Excited" – The Pointer Sisters	Safe
Damian & Janja	22 (9,7,6)	Foxtrot	"I Want It That Way"—Backstreet Boys	Safe
Sandra & Adam	27 (10,9,8)	Waltz	"Wielka miłość"—Seweryn Krajewski	Safe

=== Week 3: Hometown Glory ===
Running order

Couple	Score	Dance	Music	Result
Akop & Sara	16 (7,4,5)	Jive	"Don't Stop Me Now"—Queen	Safe
Barbara & Jacek	27 (10,9,8)	Foxtrot	"Isn't She Lovely"—Stevie Wonder	Safe
Magda & Kamil	12 (6,2,4)	Rumba	"Señorita"—Shawn Mendes and Camila Cabello	Safe
Damian & Janja	23 (9,7,7)	Cha-cha-cha	"Heaven Is a Place on Earth"—Belinda Carlisle	Safe
Sandra & Adam	21 (8,8,5)	Paso Doble	"Meluzyna"—Małgorzata Ostrowska	Safe
Joanna & Rafał	21 (8,7,6)	Cha-cha-cha	"To co nam było"—Red Lips	Eliminated
Monika & Jan	22 (9,6,7)	Rumba	"True Colors"—Cyndi Lauper	Safe
Adam & Hanna	23 (9,8,6)	Quickstep	"Miłość w Zakopanem"—Sławomir	Safe
Ola & Tomasz	20 (9,5,6)	Cha-cha-cha	"Ostatni raz zatańczysz ze mną"—Krzysztof Krawczyk	Safe

=== Week 4: 80s Week ===
Running order

Couple	Score	Dance	Music	Result
Sandra & Adam	26 (10,9,7)	Foxtrot	"I Just Called to Say I Love You"—Stevie Wonder	Safe
Magda & Kamil	11 (6,2,3)	Jive	"Take On Me"—A-ha	Safe
Ola & Tomasz	22 (9,7,6)	Waltz	"If You Don't Know Me by Now"—Simply Red	Safe
Akop & Sara	17 (7,5,5)	Paso Doble	"Another One Bites the Dust"—Queen	Safe
Monika & Jan	17 (8,4,5)	Quickstep	"Słodkiego, miłego życia"—Kombi	Safe
Adam & Hanna	17 (7,6,4)	Cha-cha-cha	"Billie Jean"—Michael Jackson	Eliminated
Damian & Janja	27 (10,8,9)	Paso Doble	"The Final Countdown"—Europe	Safe
Barbara & Jacek	26 (10,8,8)	Samba	"Conga"—Gloria Estefan	Safe

=== Week 5: Auntie's Nameday Party ===
Individual judges scores in the charts below (given in parentheses) are listed in this order from left to right: Andrzej Grabowski, Iwona Pavlović and Kris Adamski.

Running order

Couple	Score	Dance	Music	Result
Akop & Sara; Sandra & Adam; Barbara & Jacek; Ola & Tomasz; Magda & Kamil; Damian & Janja; Monika & Jan	3 - - - - - -	Improvisation; Marathon	"Jesteś szalona"—Boys	
Magda & Kamil	17 (8,4,5)	Viennese Waltz	"Weź nie pytaj"—Paweł Domagała	Safe
Akop & Sara	18 (7,5,6)	Foxtrot	"Ona tańczy dla mnie"—Weekend	Eliminated
Ola & Tomasz	20 (7,6,7)	Rumba	"Belye rozy"—Yuri Shatunov	Safe
Monika & Jan	21 (8,6,7)	Jive	"Ruda tańczy jak szalona"—Czadoman	Safe
Sandra & Adam	28 (10,9,9)	Tango	"Takie tango"—Budka Suflera	Safe
Barbara & Jacek	30 (10,10,10)	Viennese Waltz	"Biały miś"—Tymon Tymański	Safe
Damian & Janja	30 (10,10,10)	Quickstep	"Prawy do lewego"—Kayah & Goran Bregović	Safe

=== Week 6: 100th Episode - Polish Radio Hits ===
No elimination took place.

Running order

Couple	Score	Dance	Music
Ola & Tomasz	17 (7,5,5)	Quickstep	"Trofea"—Dawid Podsiadło
Barbara & Jacek	27 (10,9,8)	Rumba	"Kto nie kochał"—Piotr Cugowski
Damian & Janja	24 (9,8,7)	Tango	"Bądź duży"—Natalia Nykiel
Monika & Jan	19 (8,6,5)	Foxtrot	"Nie żałuję"—Natalia Zastępa
Magda & Kamil	18 (8,4,6)	Tango	"Dobrze jest, jak jest"—Roksana Węgiel
Sandra & Wojciech*	28 (9,10,9)	Contemporary	"Zakryj"—Sarsa

Dance-offs
Couple	Judges votes	Dance	Music	Result
Damian & Janja	Monika, Damian, Damian	Cha-cha-cha	"Sway"—Dean Martin	Winner (3 pts)
Monika & Jan	Monika, Damian, Damian	Cha-cha-cha	"Sway"—Dean Martin	Loser
Barbara & Jacek	Barbara, Barbara, Sandra	Foxtrot	"Fever"—Peggy Lee	Winner (3 pts)
Sandra & Wojciech*	Barbara, Barbara, Sandra	Foxtrot	"Fever"—Peggy Lee	Loser
Magda & Kamil	Ola, Ola, Ola	Jive	"Hit the Road Jack"—Ray Charles	Loser
Ola & Tomasz	Ola, Ola, Ola	Jive	"Hit the Road Jack"—Ray Charles	Winner (3 pts)

*Due to injury, Adam was unable to dance this week.

=== Week 7: Family and Friends Dances ===
Running order

Couple	Score	Dance	Music	Result
Magda & Kamil (Monika Bereda)	15 (7,5,3)	Charleston	"The Charleston"—James P. Johnson	Safe
Magda & Kamil (Monika Bereda)	-	Samba	"The Lazy Song"—Bruno Mars	Safe
Barbara & Jacek (Janusz Kurdej)	26 (10,8,8)	Quickstep	"Thinking Out Loud"—Ed Sheeran	Safe
Barbara & Jacek (Janusz Kurdej)	-	Rumba	"Wind of Change"—Scorpions	Safe
Ola & Tomasz (Jakub Wajda)	22 (9,6,7)	Samba	"Acapella"—Mikolas Josef ft. Fito Blanko & Frankie J	Eliminated
Ola & Tomasz (Jakub Wajda)	1 (-,-,1)	Swing	"All About That Bass"—Meghan Trainor	Eliminated
Sandra & Adam (Harry Jefferson)	28 (10,9,9)	Salsa	"Bailando"—Enrique Iglesias	Safe
Sandra & Adam (Harry Jefferson)	1 (-,1,-)	Tango	"Toxic"—Britney Spears	Safe
Damian & Janja (Renata Kordas)	29 (10,10,9)	Contemporary	"Hej Wy!"—Kortez	Safe
Damian & Janja (Renata Kordas)	-	Cha-cha-cha	"Oh, Pretty Woman"—Roy Orbison	Safe
Monika & Jan (Leszek Miller)	23 (9,7,7)	Paso Doble	"Hej hej!"—Daria Zawiałow	Safe
Monika & Jan (Leszek Miller)	1 (1,-,-)	Waltz	"Yesterday"—The Beatles	Safe

=== Week 8: Movie Week ===
Running order

Couple	Score	Dance	Music	Movie	Result
Monika & Jan	18 (8,5,5)	Jive	"You Never Can Tell"—Chuck Berry	Pulp Fiction	1st Eliminated
Monika & Jan	-	Contemporary	"Shallow"—Lady Gaga & Bradley Cooper	A Star Is Born	1st Eliminated
Magda & Kamil	18 (8,4,6)	Tango	"Mamma Mia"—ABBA	Mamma Mia!	2nd Eliminated
Magda & Kamil	19 (8,6,5)	Bollywood	"Jai Ho! (You Are My Destiny)"—The Pussycat Dolls	Slumdog Millionaire	2nd Eliminated
Barbara & Jacek	27 (10,8,9)	Waltz	"All by Myself"—Jamie O'Neal	Bridget Jones's Diary	Safe
Barbara & Jacek	28 (10,10,8)	Paso Doble	"Pirates of the Caribbean Theme"	Pirates of the Caribbean	Safe
Damian & Janja	30 (10,10,10)	Paso Doble	"Canción del Mariachi"—Antonio Banderas	Desperado	Safe
Damian & Janja	28 (10,9,9)	Waltz	"Unchained Melody"—The Righteous Brothers	Ghost	Safe
Sandra & Wojciech	30 (10,10,10)	Contemporary	"Swan Lake"—Pyotr Ilyich Tchaikovsky	Black Swan	Safe
Sandra & Wojciech	24 (9,7,8)	Viennese Waltz	"Earned It"—The Weeknd	Fifty Shades of Grey	Safe

=== Week 9: Trio Challenge (Semi-final) ===
Running order

Couple	Score	Dance	Music	Result
Sandra & Wojciech (Robert Wabich)	27 (10,9,8)	Paso Doble	"Meluzyna"—Małgorzata Ostrowska	Bottom two
Sandra & Wojciech (Robert Wabich)	30 (10,10,10)	Jive	"Choo Choo Ch'Boogie"—Indigo Swing	Bottom two
Damian & Janja (Dawid Kwiatkowski)	29 (10,9,10)	Jive	"Cheap Thrills"—Sia	Safe
Damian & Janja (Dawid Kwiatkowski)	29 (10,10,9)	Samba	"Cotton Eye Joe"—Rednex	Safe
Barbara & Jacek (Elżbieta Romanowska)	30 (10,10,10)	Cha-cha-cha	"Sugar"—Maroon 5	Bottom two
Barbara & Jacek (Elżbieta Romanowska)	30 (10,10,10)	Charleston	"Five Foot Two, Eyes of Blue"—Spike Jones	Bottom two

Dance-off

Running order

Couple	Score	Dance	Music	Result
Sandra & Wojciech	30 (10,10,10)	Tango	"I've Seen That Face Before (Libertango)"—Grace Jones	Third place
Barbara & Jacek	30 (10,10,10)	Tango	"I've Seen That Face Before (Libertango)"—Grace Jones	Safe

=== Week 10: Season Finale ===
Running order

Couple	Score	Dance	Music	Result
Barbara & Jacek	27 (10,9,8)	Rumba	"Kto nie kochał"—Piotr Cugowski	Runners-up
Barbara & Jacek	29 (10,10,9)	Contemporary	"Let me dream"—Michał Szpak	Runners-up
Barbara & Jacek	30 (10,10,10)	Showdance	"Dumka na dwa serca"—Edyta Górniak & Mieczysław Szcześniak	Runners-up
Damian & Janja	29 (10,9,10)	Paso Doble	"Canción del Mariachi"—Antonio Banderas	Winners
Damian & Janja	27 (10,9,8)	Cha-cha-cha	"Za krokiem krok"—Cleo	Winners
Damian & Janja	30 (10,10,10)	Showdance	"Ostatni"—Edyta Bartosiewicz	Winners

Other Dances

Couple	Dance	Music
Sandra & Wojciech	Viennese Waltz	"What The World Needs Now Is Love"—Jackie DeShannon
Magda & Kamil	Viennese Waltz	"What The World Needs Now Is Love"—Jackie DeShannon
Monika & Jan	Viennese Waltz	"What The World Needs Now Is Love"—Jackie DeShannon
Ola & Tomasz	Viennese Waltz	"What The World Needs Now Is Love"—Jackie DeShannon
Akop & Sara	Viennese Waltz	"What The World Needs Now Is Love"—Jackie DeShannon
Adam & Hanna	Viennese Waltz	"What The World Needs Now Is Love"—Jackie DeShannon
Joanna & Rafał	Viennese Waltz	"What The World Needs Now Is Love"—Jackie DeShannon
Rafał & Lenka	Viennese Waltz	"What The World Needs Now Is Love"—Jackie DeShannon
Reni & Misha	Viennese Waltz	"What The World Needs Now Is Love"—Jackie DeShannon

== Dance chart ==
The celebrities and professional partners danced one of these routines for each corresponding week:

- Week 1 (Season Premiere): Cha-cha-cha, Jive, Tango, Waltz
- Week 2: One unlearned dance (introducing Viennese Waltz, Foxtrot, Quickstep)
- Week 3 (Hometown Glory): One unlearned dance (introducing Rumba, Paso Doble)
- Week 4 (80s Week): One unlearned dance (introducing Samba)
- Week 5 (Auntie's Nameday Party): Improvisation Marathon and one unlearned dance
- Week 6 (100th Episode - Polish Radio Hits): One unlearned dance (introducing Contemporary) and dance-offs
- Week 7 (Family and Friends Dances): One unlearned dance (introducing Salsa, Charleston, Swing) and one repeated dance
  Monika & Jan, Magda & Kamil and Ola & Tomasz: Two unlearned dances
- Week 8 (Movie Week): One unlearned dance (introducing Bollywood) and one repeated dance
  Barbara & Jacek: Two unlearned dances
- Week 9 (Semi-final: Trio Challenge): One repeated dance, one unlearned dance and dance-offs
- Week 10 (Season Finale): Couple's favorite dance of the season, one unlearned dance and Showdance

Couple	1	2	3	4	5		6		7		8		9			10		
Damian & Janja	Jive	Foxtrot	Cha-cha-cha	Paso Doble	Improvisation (Marathon)	Quickstep	Tango	Cha-cha-cha	Contemporary	Cha-cha-cha	Paso Doble	Waltz	Jive	Samba	- (Immunity)	Paso Doble	Cha-cha-cha	Showdance
Barbara & Jacek	Tango	Cha-cha-cha	Foxtrot	Samba	Improvisation (Marathon)	Viennese Waltz	Rumba	Foxtrot	Quickstep	Rumba	Waltz	Paso Doble	Cha-cha-cha	Charleston	Tango	Rumba	Contemporary	Showdance
Sandra & Adam / Wojciech	Cha-cha-cha	Waltz	Paso Doble	Foxtrot	Improvisation (Marathon)	Tango	Contemporary	Foxtrot	Salsa	Tango	Contemporary	Viennese Waltz	Paso Doble	Jive	Tango			Viennese Waltz
Magda & Kamil	Cha-cha-cha	Quickstep	Rumba	Jive	Improvisation (Marathon)	Viennese Waltz	Tango	Jive	Charleston	Samba	Tango	Bollywood						Viennese Waltz
Monika & Jan	Cha-cha-cha	Tango	Rumba	Quickstep	Improvisation (Marathon)	Jive	Foxtrot	Cha-cha-cha	Paso Doble	Waltz	Jive							Viennese Waltz
Ola & Tomasz	Jive	Foxtrot	Cha-cha-cha	Waltz	Improvisation (Marathon)	Rumba	Quickstep	Jive	Samba	Swing								Viennese Waltz
Akop & Sara	Cha-cha-cha	Viennese Waltz	Jive	Paso Doble	Improvisation (Marathon)	Foxtrot												Viennese Waltz
Adam & Hanna	Tango	Jive	Quickstep	Cha-cha-cha														Viennese Waltz
Joanna & Rafał	Waltz	Jive	Cha-cha-cha															Viennese Waltz
Rafał & Lenka	Waltz	Jive																Viennese Waltz
Reni & Misha	Waltz																	Viennese Waltz

Highest scoring dance
Lowest scoring dance
Performed, but not scored
Bonus points
Gained bonus points for winning this dance-off
Gained no bonus points for losing this dance-off

== Guest performances ==
Date	Artist(s)	Song(s)	Dancers
13 September 2019	Tomasz Szymuś's Orchestra	"Sing, Sing, Sing (With a Swing)"	All professional dancers, celebrities and judges
27 September 2019	Łukasz Zagrobelny	"Ostatni raz zatańczysz ze mną"	Ola Kot and Tomasz Barański
4 October 2019	Piotr Cugowski	"Another One Bites the Dust"	Akop Szostak and Sara Janicka
4 October 2019	Piotr Cugowski	"Daj mi żyć"	
4 October 2019	Grzegorz Skawiński	"Słodkiego miłego życia"	Monika Miller and Jan Kliment
11 October 2019
11 October 2019	Adam Asanov	"Bałkanica"	All professional dancers, celebrities and judges
11 October 2019	Czadoman	"Ruda tańczy jak szalona"	Monika Miller and Jan Kliment
11 October 2019	Adam Asanov & Czadoman	"La Bamba"	All professional dancers and celebrities
18 October 2019	Piotr Cugowski	"Kto nie kochał"	Barbara Kurdej-Szatan & Jacek Jeschke
18 October 2019	Natalia Zastępa	"Nie żałuję"	Monika Miller & Jan Kliment
25 October 2019	Agnieszka Hekiert	"Porządek świata"	-
8 November 2019	Tomasz Szymuś's Orchestra	"James Bond Theme"	All professional dancers and celebrities
8 November 2019	Tomasz Szymuś's Orchestra	"My Heart Will Go On"	All professional dancers and celebrities
8 November 2019	Tomasz Szymuś's Orchestra	"The Incredibles Theme (???)"	All professional dancers and celebrities
8 November 2019	Red Lips	"Cappuccino"	-
15 November 2019	Michał Bajor	"Quando Quando Quando"	All professional dancers and celebrities
15 November 2019	Michał Bajor	"Jak ten śnieg pada"	Iwona Pavlović and Rafał Maserak
15 November 2019	Marcin Wyrostek	"I've Seen That Face Before (Libertango)"	Sandra Kubicka & Wojciech Jeschke
15 November 2019	Marcin Wyrostek	"Cicha woda"	Barbara Kurdej-Szatan & Jacek Jeschke
15 November 2019	Reni Jusis	"Kiedyś Cię znajdę"	-
22 November 2019	Tomasz Szymuś's Orchestra	"Can't Take My Eyes Off Of You"	All professional dancers and celebrities
22 November 2019	Rafał Szatan	"Kto nie kochał"	Barbara Kurdej-Szatan & Jacek Jeschke
22 November 2019	Tomasz Szymuś's Orchestra	"(I've Had) The Time of My Life"	Hania & Łukasz Skowron
22 November 2019	Michał Szpak	"Let me dream"	Barbara Kurdej-Szatan & Jacek Jeschke
22 November 2019	Cleo	"Za krokiem krok"	Damian Kordas & Janja Lesar
22 November 2019	Tomasz Szymuś's Orchestra	"La Cumparsita"	Christian Marquez & Virgina Gomez, Facundo Pinero & Vanesa Villalba, Manuela Rossi & Juan Malizia, Patrycja Cisowska–Grzybek & Jakub Grzybek
22 November 2019	Katarzyna Łaska	"Chcę uwierzyć snom"	Ramada Dance School (Opole)
22 November 2019	Anna Karwan	"What The World Needs Now Is Love"	All professional dancers and celebrities

== Rating figures ==
Date	Episode	Official rating 4+	Share 4+	Official rating 16–49	Share 16–49	Official rating 16–59	Share 16–59
13 September 2019	1	2 128 753	15.37%				
20 September 2019	2	2 061 030	14.41%				
27 September 2019	3	2 113 472	14.68%				
4 October 2019	4	2 045 609	14.31%				
11 October 2019	5	2 161 947	14.88%				
18 October 2019	6	2 263 082	15.76%				
25 October 2019	7	2 473 992	17.35%				
8 November 2019	8	2 176 552	15.42%				
15 November 2019	9	2 345 736	15.86%				
22 November 2019	10	2 653 257	18.09%				
Average	Fall 2019	2 244 954	15.63%	557 760	10.88%	950 060	12.49%
