= Dancing with the Stars. Taniec z gwiazdami =

- Created by: BBC Worldwide; ITI Group (2005–2011); Rochstar (2014–2022); Jake Vision (2024–present)
- Directed by: Michał Bandurski (32–present); Wojciech Iwański (1–7, 27–31); Agata Lipnicka-Modrzejewska (14–26); Maciej Sobociński (13); Jan Kepinski (8–12)
- Presented by: Krzysztof Ibisz (14–present); Paulina Sykut-Jeżyna (18–present); Izabela Janachowska (25–26); Anna Głogowska (14–17); Natasza Urbańska (13); Piotr Gąsowski (6–13); Katarzyna Skrzynecka (2–12); Hubert Urbański (1–5); Magdalena Mołek (1)
- Judges: Iwona Pavlović (1–present); Rafał Maserak (27–present); Tomasz Wygoda (27–present); Julia Wieniawa (32–present); Ewa Kasprzyk (27–31); Andrzej Grabowski (14–26); Michał Malitowski (14–21, 23–26); Andrzej Piaseczny (25–26); Ola Jordan (21–22); Beata Tyszkiewicz (1–12, 14–20); Piotr Galiński (1–13); Jolanta Fraszyńska (13); Janusz Józefowicz (13); Zbigniew Wodecki (†) (1–12)
- Country of origin: Poland
- No. of seasons: 31
- No. of episodes: 330

Production
- Production locations: Transcolor Studio, Szeligi near Warsaw (2005–2011); ATM Studio, Warsaw (2014–2022); Studia Łubinowa - Cyfrowy Polsat (2024–present)
- Running time: approx. 65 to 120 minutes per episode (excluding commercials)

Original release
- Network: TVN
- Release: 16 April 2005 – 27 November 2011
- Network: Polsat
- Release: 7 March 2014 – 31 October 2022
- Network: Polsat
- Release: 3 March 2024 – present

Dancing with the Stars. Taniec z gwiazdami (previously simply Taniec z gwiazdami [ˈtaɲɛd͡z z ɡvjazˈdami]) is a Polish light entertainment reality television series broadcast by Polsat. It is the Polish version of the British reality TV competition Strictly Come Dancing and is part of the Dancing with the Stars franchise.

The show first aired on TVN in the spring of 2005. Since then, a new season has aired every autumn and spring, except for a break in 2012–2013.

Every Sunday, ratings average more than 7 million viewers for the first airing. The highest-rated episode was the second-season finale when ratings were around 8 million people.

Since the beginning of the show, there have been four different presenters. Magda Mołek was the female host only during the show's first season. Hubert Urbański, hosted initially with Mołek during the first season, and stayed with the show until mid-2007 after the fifth season. Katarzyna Skrzynecka, an actress and singer, was the female co-host in seasons 2–12. Piotr Gąsowski was introduced in 2007 as the new host to replace Urbański. He is an entertainer and an actor. In season 13, Katarzyna Skrzynecka was replaced by Natasza Urbańska as the female co-host. In season 14, both hosts were replaced by television host Krzysztof Ibisz and Anna Głogowska, a dancer, television host, and the winner of the 13th season. She was the female co-host in seasons 14–17. In season 18, Anna Głogowska was replaced by Paulina Sykut-Jeżyna as the female host. In season 25, Izabela Janachowska, a former professional dancer, joined the host team. Izabela Janachowska left the show after the 26th season.

The judging panel is composed of Iwona Pavlović, a retired professional dancer and currently a dancing judge; Rafał Maserak, dancer, choreographer, dance instructor and television personality, Tomasz Wygoda, dancer, actor, choreographer, teacher and Julia Wieniawa, actress and singer.

== Format ==
The show pairs several celebrities with professional dancers who each week compete against each other to impress a panel of judges and the viewing public to survive potential elimination. Through a telephone poll, viewers vote on who should stay in the competition. The poll results are combined with the ranking of the panel of judges. The couple with the lowest number of points drop out from each episode. Each judge performs a mark out of ten, giving an overall total of forty (thirty in seasons 22-24).

== Cast timeline ==
Color key:

Host	Co-host	Contestant	Professional	Judge	Choreographer	Musical director	Guest Judge	Guest host	Director	Narrator

Cast member	Seasons on TVN													Seasons on Polsat																		
Cast member	1	2	3	4	5	6	7	8	9	10	11	12	13	14	15	16	17	18	19	20	21	22	23	24	25	26	27	28	29	30	31	32
Michał Bandurski																																
Agata Lipnicka-Modrzejewska																																
Maciej Sobociński																																
Jan Kepinski																																
Wojciech Iwański																																
Grzegorz Pawlak																																
Krzysztof Ibisz																																
Mikołaj "Bagi" Bagiński																																
Piotr Gąsowski																																
Hubert Urbański																																
Paulina Sykut-Jeżyna																																
Izabela Janachowska																																
Anna Głogowska																																
Natasza Urbańska																																
Katarzyna Skrzynecka																																
Magda Mołek																																
Iwona Pavlović																																
Rafał Maserak																																
Tomasz Wygoda																																
Julia Wieniawa																																
Ewa Kasprzyk																																
Andrzej Grabowski																																
Michał Malitowski																																
Andrzej Piaseczny																																
Ola Jordan																																
Beata Tyszkiewicz																																
Piotr Galiński																																
Jolanta Fraszyńska																																
Janusz Józefowicz																																
Zbigniew Wodecki (†)																																
Jolanta Kwaśniewska																																
Edyta Górniak																																
Maryla Rodowicz																																
Agata Kulesza																																
Kayah																																
Beata Kozidrak																																
Małgorzata Socha																																
Krzysztof Adamski																																
Stefano Terrazzino																																
Robert Kupisz																																
Tomasz Szymuś																																
Adam Sztaba																																
Jacek Jeschke																																
Michał Jeziorowski																																
Janja Lesar																																
Jakub Pursa																																
Maciej Zakliczyński																																
Tomasz Barański																																
Krzysztof Hulboj																																
Kamila Kajak-Mosejcuk																																
Joanna Szokalska																																
Agustin Egurrola																																
Colin James																																

=== Judges ===
Lineup of judges by seat order
Season	Year	Judges			
Season	Year	1	2	3	4
1	Spring 2005	Iwona	Zbigniew	Beata	Piotr
2	Fall 2005	Iwona	Zbigniew	Beata	Piotr
3	Spring 2006	Iwona	Zbigniew	Beata	Piotr
4	Fall 2006	Iwona	Zbigniew	Beata	Piotr
5	Spring 2007	Piotr	Beata	Zbigniew	Iwona
6	Fall 2007	Piotr	Beata	Zbigniew	Iwona
7	Spring 2008	Iwona	Zbigniew	Beata	Piotr
8	Fall 2008	Iwona	Zbigniew	Beata	Piotr
9	Spring 2009	Iwona	Zbigniew	Beata	Piotr
10	Fall 2009	Iwona	Zbigniew	Beata	Piotr
11	Spring 2010	Iwona	Zbigniew	Beata	Piotr
12	Fall 2010	Iwona	Zbigniew	Beata	Piotr
13	Spring 2011	Iwona	Janusz	Jolanta	Piotr
14	Spring 2014	Andrzej G.	Iwona	Beata	Michał
15	Fall 2014	Michał	Beata	Iwona	Andrzej G.
16	Spring 2015	Andrzej G.	Iwona	Beata	Michał
17	Fall 2015	Andrzej G.	Iwona	Beata	Michał
18	Spring 2016	Andrzej G.	Iwona	Beata	Michał
19	Fall 2016	Iwona	Andrzej G.	Beata	Michał
20	Spring 2017	Iwona	Andrzej G.	Beata	Michał
21	Spring 2018	Iwona	Andrzej G.	Ola	Michał
22	Spring 2019	Iwona	Andrzej G.	Ola	—
23	Fall 2019	Andrzej G.	Iwona	Michał	—
24	Spring, Fall 2020	Andrzej G.	Iwona	Michał	—
25	Fall 2021	Andrzej P.	Iwona	Michał	Andrzej G.
26	Fall 2022	Andrzej P.	Iwona	Michał	Andrzej G.
27	Spring 2024	Rafał	Ewa	Tomasz	Iwona
28	Fall 2024	Rafał	Ewa	Tomasz	Iwona
29	Spring 2025	Rafał	Ewa	Tomasz	Iwona
30	Fall 2025	Rafał	Ewa	Tomasz	Iwona
31	Spring 2026	Rafał	Ewa	Tomasz	Iwona
32	Fall 2026	Tomasz	Julia	Rafał	Iwona
33	Spring 2027	Tomasz	Julia	Rafał	Iwona
34	Fall 2027	Tomasz	Julia	Rafał	Iwona

== Series overview ==
Season	No. of stars	No. of weeks	Duration dates	Celebrity honor places			
Season	No. of stars	No. of weeks	Duration dates	Winner	Second place	Third place	Fourth place
1) Spring 2005	8	8	16 April – 4 June 2005	Olivier Janiak & Kamila Kajak	Witold Paszt (†) & Anna Głogowska	Andrzej Nejman & Magdalena Soszyńska-Michno	Katarzyna Skrzynecka & Marcin Hakiel
2) Fall 2005	10	10	11 September – 4 December 2005	Katarzyna Cichopek & Marcin Hakiel	Małgorzata Foremniak & Rafał Maserak	Jakub Wesołowski & Edyta Herbuś	Agnieszka Rylik & Marcin Olszewski
3) Spring 2006	10	10	5 March – 14 May 2006	* Rafał Mroczek & Aneta Piotrowska	Aleksandra Kwaśniewska & Rafał Maserak	Joanna Koroniewska & Robert Kochanek	Joanna Jabłczyńska & Piotr Kiszka
4) Fall 2006	10	10	10 September – 12 November 2006	Kinga Rusin & Stefano Terrazzino	Peter J. Lucas & Dominika Kublik-Marzec	Marcin Mroczek & Edyta Herbuś	Przemysław Sadowski & Ewa Szabatin
5) Spring 2007	10	10	4 March – 6 May 2007	‡ Krzysztof Tyniec & Kamila Kajak	Ivan Komarenko & Blanka Winiarska	Katarzyna Tusk & Stefano Terrazzino	Kasia Cerekwicka & Żora Korolyov (†)
6) Fall 2007	14	12	9 September – 25 November 2007	Anna Guzik & Łukasz Czarnecki	Justyna Steczkowska & Stefano Terrazzino	Mateusz Damięcki & Ewa Szabatin	Rafał Bryndal & Magdalena Soszyńska-Michno
7) Spring 2008	14	13	2 March – 25 May 2008	Magdalena Walach & Cezary Olszewski (†)	Mariusz Pudzianowski & Magdalena Soszyńska-Michno	Tamara Arciuch & Łukasz Czarnecki	Robert Janowski & Anna Bosak
8) Fall 2008	14	13	7 September – 30 November 2008	Agata Kulesza & Stefano Terrazzino	Natalia Lesz & Łukasz Czarnecki	Marta Żmuda Trzebiatowska & Adam Król	Steve Allen & Anna Głogowska
9) Spring 2009	12	11	8 March – 17 May 2009	Dorota Gardias & Andrej Mosejcuk	Bartek Kasprzykowski & Blanka Winiarska	Jay Delano & Kamila Kajak	Monika Richardson & Krzysztof Hulboj
10) Fall 2009	12	12	6 September – 29 November 2009	Anna Mucha & Rafał Maserak	Natasza Urbańska & Ján Kliment	Michał Kwiatkowski & Janja Lesar	Radosław Majdan & Izabela Janachowska
11) Spring 2010	12	12	7 March – 13 June 2010	Julia Kamińska & Rafał Maserak	Katarzyna Glinka & Stefano Terrazzino	Katarzyna Grochola & Ján Kliment	Olga Bołądź & Łukasz Czarnecki
12) Fall 2010	14	13	5 September – 28 November 2010	Monika Pyrek & Robert Rowiński	Paweł Staliński & Izabela Janachowska	Edyta Górniak & Ján Kliment	Patricia Kazadi & Łukasz Czarnecki
13) Fall 2011	14	13	4 September – 27 November 2011	Kacper Kuszewski & Anna Głogowska	Bilguun Ariunbaatar & Janja Lesar	Weronika Marczuk & Ján Kliment	Katarzyna Zielińska & Rafał Maserak
14) Spring 2014	12	11	7 March – 23 May 2014	Aneta Zając & Stefano Terrazzino	Joanna Moro & Rafał Maserak	Dawid Kwiatkowski & Janja Lesar	Klaudia Halejcio & Tomasz Barański
15) Fall 2014	12	11	5 September – 14 November 2014	Agnieszka Sienkiewicz & Stefano Terrazzino	Anna Wyszkoni & Ján Kliment	Marcelina Zawadzka & Rafał Maserak	Mateusz Banasiuk & Hanna Żudziewicz
16) Spring 2015	12	11	6 March – 22 May 2015	Krzysztof Wieszczek & Agnieszka Kaczorowska	Tatiana Okupnik & Tomasz Barański	Julia Pogrebińska & Rafał Maserak	Ewa Kasprzyk & Jan Kliment
17) Fall 2015	11	10	11 September – 13 November 2015	Ewelina Lisowska & Tomasz Barański	Łukasz Kadziewicz & Agnieszka Kaczorowska	Cleo & Ján Kliment	Małgorzata Pieńkowska & Stefano Terrazzino
18) Spring 2016	11	10	4 March – 13 May 2016	Anna Karczmarczyk & Jacek Jeschke	Elżbieta Romanowska & Rafał Maserak	Julia Wróblewska & Ján Kliment	Rafał Jonkisz & Valeriya Zhuravlyova
19) Fall 2016	11	10	2 September – 4 November 2016	Robert Wabich & Hanna Żudziewicz	Olga Kalicka & Rafał Maserak	Misheel Jargalsaikhan & Ján Kliment	Adam Zdrójkowski & Wiktoria Omyła
20) Spring 2017	11	10	3 March – 12 May 2017	* Natalia Szroeder & Ján Kliment	Iwona Cichosz & Stefano Terrazzino	Marcin Korcz & Wiktoria Omyła	Dominika Gwit & Żora Korolyov (†)
21) Spring 2018	11	10	2 March – 11 May 2018	Beata Tadla & Ján Kliment	Katarzyna Dziurska & Tomasz Barański	Popek & Janja Lesar	Dariusz Wieteska & Katarzyna Vu Manh
22) Spring 2019	12	11	1 March – 17 May 2019	Joanna Mazur & Ján Kliment	Tomasz Gimper Działowy & Natalia Głębocka	Tamara Gonzalez Perea & Rafał Maserak	Jakub Kucner & Lenka Klimentová
23) Fall 2019	11	10	13 September – 22 November 2019	Damian Kordas & Janja Lesar	Barbara Kurdej-Szatan & Jacek Jeschke	Sandra Kubicka & Wojciech Jeschke	Magda Bereda & Kamil Kuroczko
24) 2020	11	10	6 March – 23 October 2020	Edyta Zając & Michał Bartkiewicz	Julia Wieniawa & Stefano Terrazzino	Sylwester Wilk & Hanna Żudziewicz	Sylwia Lipka & Rafał Maserak
25) Fall 2021	10	9	30 August – 25 October 2021	Piotr Mróz & Hanna Żudziewicz	Magdalena Kajrowicz-Zapała & Rafał Maserak	Oliwia Bieniuk & Michał Bartkiewicz	Sylwia Bomba & Jacek Jeschke
26) Fall 2022	11	10	29 August – 31 October 2022	Ilona Krawczyńska & Robert Rowiński	Jacek Jelonek & Michał Danilczuk	Wiesław Nowobilski & Janja Lesar	Natalia Janoszek & Rafał Maserak
27) Spring 2024	12	10	3 March – 5 May 2024	‡ Anita Sokołowska & Jacek Jeschke	Roksana Węgiel & Michał Kassin	Julia Maffashion Kuczyńska & Michał Danilczuk	Maciej Musiał & Daria Syta
28) Fall 2024	12	10	15 September – 17 November 2024	Vanessa Aleksander & Michał Bartkiewicz	Julia Żugaj & Wojciech Kucina	Maciej Zakościelny & Sara Janicka	Majka Jeżowska & Michał Danilczuk
29) Spring 2025	12	10	2 March – 11 May 2025	Maria Jeleniewska & Jacek Jeschke	Filip Gurłacz & Agnieszka Kaczorowska	Adrianna Borek & Albert Kosiński	Tomasz Wolny & Daria Syta
30) Fall 2025	12	10	14 September – 16 November 2025	Mikołaj "Bagi" Bagiński & Magdalena Tarnowska	Maurycy Popiel & Sara Janicka	Wiktoria Gorodecka & Kamil Kuroczko	Katarzyna Zillmann & Janja Lesar; Tomasz Karolak & Izabela Skierska
31) Spring 2026	12	10	1 March – 10 May 2026	Gamou Fall & Hanna Żudziewicz	Magdalena Boczarska & Jacek Jeschke	Sebastian Fabijański & Julia Suryś	Paulina Gałązka & Michał Bartkiewicz
32) Fall 2026	12	12	6 September 2026 - 29 November 2026				

* Youngest male winner at age 23; youngest female winner at age 22
‡ Oldest male winner at age 51; oldest female winner at age 48

== Professional dancers ==
Each season, celebrities are paired with professional dance partners who instruct them in the various dance styles, design their choreography, and perform with them each week in the competition. Color key:

Professional	Finalist	Winner	Last Place	Withdrew

Professional dancer	Seasons on TVN													Seasons on Polsat																		
Professional dancer	1	2	3	4	5	6	7	8	9	10	11	12	13	14	15	16	17	18	19	20	21	22	23	24	25	26	27	28	29	30	31	32
Krystian Rzymkiewicz																																
Estelle Francois																																
Kacper Rutka																																
Magdalena Tarnowska																																
Daria Syta-Grobelna																																
Izabela Skierska																																
Michał Kassin																																
Julia Suryś-Stromecka																																
Roman Osadchiy																																
Michał Bartkiewicz																																
Sara Janicka																																
Kamil Kuroczko																																
Albert Kosiński																																
Klaudia Rąba																																
Wojciech Kucina																																
Mieszko Masłowski																																
Jacek Jeschke																																
Hanna Żudziewicz-Jeschke																																
Stefano Terrazzino																																
Piotr Musiałkowski																																
Agnieszka Kaczorowska																																
Janja Lesar																																
Lenka Klimentová																																
Jan Kliment																																
Michał Danilczuk																																
Marcin Zaprawa																																
Magdalena Perlińska																																
Kamil Gwara																																
Katarzyna Vu Manh																																
Marcin Hakiel																																
Dominik Rudnicki-Sipajło																																
Sylwia Madeńska																																
Wiktoria Omyła																																
Robert Rowiński																																
Rafał Maserak																																
Jakub Lipowski																																
Paulina Biernat																																
Misha Steciuk																																
Adam Adamonis																																
Tomasz Barański																																
Wojciech Jeschke																																
Michał Jeziorowski																																
Natalia Głębocka																																
Valeriya Zhuravlyova																																
Oskar Dziedzic																																
Żora Korolyov																																
Magdalena Molęda																																
Nina Tyrka																																
Magdalena Soszyńska																																
Robert Kochanek																																
Paulina Janicka																																
Krzysztof Hulboj																																
Przemysław Modrzyński																																
Łukasz Czarnecki																																
Izabela Janachowska																																
Andrej Mosejcuk																																
Kamila Kajak-Mosejcuk																																
Michał Stukan																																
Bianka Żubrowska																																
Przemysław Juszkiewicz																																
Blanka Winiarska																																
Anna Głogowska																																
Cezary Olszewski																																
Katarzyna Krupa																																
Aneta Piotrowska																																
Sławomir Turski																																
Agnieszka Pomorska																																
Adam Król																																
Anna Bosak																																
Mario Di Somma																																
Milan Plačko																																
Alesya Surova																																
Amy Bennett																																
Michał Uryniuk																																
Ewa Szabatin																																
Dominika Kublik-Marzec																																
Michał Skawiński																																
Kinga Jurecka																																
Marek Fiksa																																
Paweł Godek																																
Izabela Mika																																
Edyta Herbuś																																
Piotr Kiszka																																
Kamila Drezno																																
Marcin Olszewski																																
Michał Szuba																																

== Dances ==
Color key:

Latin dance	Ballroom dance	Other dance

Dance	Seasons on TVN													Seasons on Polsat																		
Dance	1	2	3	4	5	6	7	8	9	10	11	12	13	14	15	16	17	18	19	20	21	22	23	24	25	26	27	28	29	30	31	32
Cha-cha-cha																																
Waltz																																
Rumba																																
Quickstep																																
Jive																																
Tango																																
Paso Doble																																
Foxtrot																																
Samba																																
Freestyle																																
Viennese Waltz																																
Salsa																																
American Smooth																																
American Smooth Waltz																																
American Smooth Quickstep																																
American Smooth Foxtrot																																
Argentine Tango																																
Fusion																																
Charleston																																
Swing																																
Contemporary																																
Dancehall																																
Hip-hop																																
Disco																																
Boogie-woogie																																
Bollywood																																
Pop																																
Jazz																																
Broadway																																
Showdance																																
Lambada																																
Musical																																
Rock and Roll																																
Twist																																
Country																																
K-pop																																
Mambo																																
Bachata																																
Brazilian Zouk																																
Kizomba																																
Krakowiak																																
Oberek																																
Kujawiak																																
Mazur																																
Polonez																																
Vogue																																
Funk																																
Polka																																
Mazurek																																
Góralski																																
Csárdás																																

Group Dance Chart

Dance	Seasons on TVN													Seasons on Polsat																		
Dance	1	2	3	4	5	6	7	8	9	10	11	12	13	14	15	16	17	18	19	20	21	22	23	24	25	26	27	28	29	30	31	32
Viennese Waltz																																
Freestyle																																
Mambo																																
Swing																																
Salsa																																
Rumba																																
Foxtrot																																
Cha-cha-cha																																
Rock and Roll																																
Bollywood																																
Jive																																
Disco																																
Boogie-woogie																																
Improvisation																																
Charleston																																

== Records ==
=== Number of perfect scores ===
The scores below represent the perfect scores the celebrities gained in their original season.

Celebrities

# of max. notes (50s or 40s or 30s)	Season	Place	Celebrity	Professional partner
11	10; 10; 11	Champion; Runner-up; Runner-up	Anna Mucha; Natasza Urbańska; Katarzyna Glinka	Rafał Maserak; Jan Kliment; Stefano Terrazzino
10	11; 28; 30	Champion; Champion; 3rd place	Julia Kamińska; Vanessa Aleksander; Wiktoria Gorodecka	Rafał Maserak; Michał Bartkiewicz; Kamil Kuroczko
9	27; 29; 29	Runner-up; Champion; Runner-up	Roksana Węgiel; Maria Jeleniewska; Filip Gurłacz	Michał Kassin; Jacek Jeschke; Agnieszka Kaczorowska
8	7; 12; 13; 18	Champion; 4th place Runner-up; Champion	Magdalena Walach; Patricia Kazadi; Bilguun Ariunbaatar; Anna Karczmarczyk	Cezary Olszewski; Łukasz Czarnecki; Janja Lesar; Jacek Jescke
7	6; 8; 9; 9; 12; 17; 18; 26; 31; 31; 31	Runner-up; Champion; Champion; Runner-up; Champion; Champion; Runner-up; Runner-up; Runner-up; Runner-up; Runner-up	Justyna Steczkowska; Agata Kulesza; Dorota Gardias; Bartek Kasprzykowski; Monika Pyrek; Ewelina Lisowska; Elżbieta Romanowska; Jacek Jelonek; Magdalena Boczarska; Paulina Gałązka; Sebastian Fabijański	Stefano Terrazzino; Stefano Terrazzino; Andrej Mosejcuk; Blanka Winiarska; Robert Rowiński; Tomasz Barański; Rafał Maserak; Michał Danilczuk; Jacek Jeschke; Michał Bartkiewicz; Julia Suryś
6	5; 8; 12; 19; 22; 24; 25; 28; 30; 30; 31	Champion; 3rd place Runner-up; Champion; Champion; Runner-up; Runner-up; 3rd place 4th place Runner-up; Champion	Krzysztof Tyniec; Marta Żmuda Trzebiatowska; Paweł Staliński; Robert Wabich; Joanna Mazur; Julia Wieniawa; Magdalena Kajrowicz-Zapała; Maciej Zakościelny; Katarzyna Zillmann; Maurycy Popiel; Gamou Fall	Kamila Kajak; Adam Król; Izabela Janachowska; Hanna Żudziewicz; Jan Kliment; Stefano Terrazzino; Rafał Maserak; Sara Janicka; Janja Lesar; Sara Janicka; Hanna Żudziewicz
5	6; 12; 14; 15; 16; 19; 20; 23; 25; 27; 27; 29	3rd place 3rd place Runner-up; Runner-up; Runner-up; Runner-up; Champion; Runner-up; Champion; Champion; 3rd place 5th place	Mateusz Damięcki; Edyta Górniak; Joanna Moro; Anna Wyszkoni; Tatiana Okupnik; Olga Kalicka; Natalia Szroeder; Barbara Kurdej-Szatan; Piotr Mróz; Anita Sokołowska; Julia Kuczyńska; Blanka	Ewa Szabatin; Jan Kliment; Rafał Maserak; Jan Kliment; Tomasz Barański; Rafał Maserak; Jan Kliment; Jacek Jeschke; Hanna Żudziewicz; Jacek Jeschke; Michał Danilczuk; Mieszko Masłowski
4	3; 7; 22; 24; 26; 26; 32	Champion; 3rd place 3rd place Champion; Champion; 4th place TBA	Rafał Mroczek; Tamara Arciuch; Tamara Gonzalez Perea; Edyta Zając; Ilona Krawczyńska; Natalia Janoszek; Helena Englert	Aneta Piotrowska; Łukasz Czarnecki; Rafał Maserak; Michał Bartkiewicz; Robert Rowiński; Rafał Maserak; Roman Osadchiy
3	2; 2; 6; 8; 11; 13; 14; 15; 15; 16; 17; 17; 18; 20; 21; 21; 23; 23; 27; 28; 28; 30; 32	Champion; Runner-up; Champion; Runner-up; 4th place Champion; Champion; Champion; 3rd place Champion; Runner-up; 3rd place 5th place Runner-up; Champion; Runner-up; Champion; 3rd place 5th place Runner-up; 5th place Champion; TBA	Katarzyna Cichopek; Małgorzata Foremniak; Anna Guzik; Natalia Lesz; Olga Bołądź; Kacper Kuszewski; Aneta Zając; Agnieszka Sienkiewicz; Marcelina Zawadzka; Krzysztof Wieszczek; Łukasz Kadziewicz; Cleo; Izu Ugonoh; Iwona Cichosz; Beata Tadla; Katarzyna Dziurska; Damian Kordas; Sandra Kubicka; Krzysztof Szczepaniak; Julia Żugaj; Filip Bobek; Mikołaj Bagiński; Izabela Kuna	Marcin Hakiel; Rafał Maserak; Łukasz Czarnecki; Łukasz Czarnecki; Łukasz Czarnecki; Anna Głogowska; Stefano Terrazzino; Stefano Terrazzino; Rafał Maserak; Agnieszka Kaczorowska; Agnieszka Kaczorowska; Jan Kliment; Hanna Żudziewicz; Stefano Terrazzino; Jan Kliment; Tomasz Barański; Janja Lesar; Wojciech Jeschke; Sara Janicka; Wojciech Kucina; Hanna Żudziewicz; Magdalena Tarnowska; Michał Bartkiewicz
2	1; 3; 4; 4; 5; 7; 8; 10; 11; 12; 14; 16; 20; 27; 31; 32; 32	Champion; Runner-up; Champion; 4th place Runner-up; Runner-up; 6th place 3rd place 6th place 6th place 4th place 3rd place 3rd place 4th place 7th place TBA; TBA	Olivier Janiak; Aleksandra Kwaśniewska; Kinga Rusin; Przemysław Sadowski; Ivan Komarenko; Mariusz Pudzianowski; Alan Andersz; Michał Kwiatkowski; Oceana; Maria Niklińska; Klaudia Halejcio; Julia Pogrebińska; Marcin Korcz; Maciej Musiał; Izabella Miko; Mandaryna; Dominik Rupiński	Kamila Kajak; Rafał Maserak; Stefano Terrazzino; Ewa Szabatin; Blanka Winiarska; Magdalena Soszyńska-Michno; Blanka Winiarska; Janja Lesar; Przemysław Juszkiewicz; Tomasz Barański; Tomasz Barański; Rafał Maserak; Wiktoria Omyła; Daria Syta; Albert Kosiński; Krystian Rzymkiewicz; Estelle François
1	1; 1; 3; 6; 7; 8; 8; 9; 9; 10; 11; 11; 13; 13; 14; 22; 24; 24; 25; 25; 25; 26; 28; 29; 29; 30; 30; 32; 32	Runner-up; 4th place 4th place 4th place 6th place 5th place 7th place 3rd place 4th place 6th place 3rd place 9th place 3rd place 6th place 3rd place 6th place 3rd place 5th place 5th place 6th place 7th place 6th place 6th place 3rd place 6th place 7th place 8th place 5th place 8th place	Witold Paszt; Katarzyna Skrzynecka; Joanna Jabłczyńska; Rafał Bryndal; Wojciech Łozowski; Oleg Savkin; Marek Włodarczyk; Jay Delano; Monika Richardson; Zygmunt Chajzer; Katarzyna Grochola; Aleksandra Szwed; Weronika Marczuk; Katarzyna Pakosińska; Dawid Kwiatkowski; Agnieszka Radwańska; Sylwester Wilk; Anna Karwan; Łukasz Jurkowski; Kinga Sawczuk; Izabela Małysz; Jamala; Rafał Zawierucha; Adrianna Borek; Michał Barczak; Marcin Rogacewicz; Aleksander Sikora; Piotr „Guma” Gumulec; Krzysztof Kwiatkowski	Anna Głogowska; Marcin Hakiel; Piotr Kiszka; Magdalena Soszyńska-Michno; Blanka Winiarska; Katarzyna Krupa; Kamila Kajak; Kamila Kajak; Krzysztof Hulboj; Blanka Winiarska; Jan Kliment; Robert Rowiński; Jan Kliment; Stefano Terrazzino; Janja Lesar; Stefano Terrazzino; Hanna Żudziewicz; Jan Kliment; Wiktoria Omyła; Jakub Lipowski; Stefano Terrazzino; Jacek Jeschke; Daria Syta; Albert Kosiński; Magdalena Tarnowska; Agnieszka Kaczorowska; Daria Syta; Julia Suryś-Stromecka; Sara Janicka

Professionals

- 64: Rafał Maserak
- 45: Stefano Terrazzino
- 33: Jan Kliment
- 32: Jacek Jeschke
- 25: Michał Bartkiewicz
- 22: Hanna Żudziewicz
- 21: Łukasz Czarnecki
- 20: Janja Lesar
- 18: Tomasz Barański
- 17: Agnieszka Kaczorowska
- 16: Sara Janicka
- 13: Blanka Winiarska
- 12: Michał Danilczuk, Robert Rowiński
- 10: Kamila Kajak, Kamil Kuroczko
- 9: Michał Kassin
- 8: Cezary Olszewski, Julia Suryś
- 7: Andrej Mosejcuk, Ewa Szabatin
- 6: Izabela Janachowska, Adam Król
- 5: Mieszko Masłowski
- 4: Anna Głogowska, Marcin Hakiel, Aneta Piotrowska, Daria Syta, Magdalena Tarnowska, Roman Osadchiy
- 3: Wojciech Jeschke, Wojciech Kucina, Wiktoria Omyła, Magdalena Soszyńska-Michno, Albert Kosiński
- 2: Przemysław Juszkiewicz, Krystian Rzymkiewicz, Estelle François
- 1: Piotr Kiszka, Katarzyna Krupa, Krzysztof Hulboj, Jakub Lipowski, Valeriya Zhuravlyova

=== Highest-scoring celebrities ===
The scores presented below represent the best overall accumulative average scores the celebrity gained each season. Seasons where the scores were out of 30 have been rounded out of 40.

Rank	Season	Place	Celebrity	Professional	Average score
1	30	3rd	Wiktoria Gorodecka	Kamil Kuroczko	39.21
2	10	Runner-up	Natasza Urbańska	Ján Kliment	39.18
3	29	Champion	Maria Jeleniewska	Jacek Jeschke	38.93
4	11	6th	Oceana Mahlmann	Przemysław Juszkiewicz	38.86
5	29	Runner-up	Filip Gurłacz	Agnieszka Kaczorowska	38.80
6	11	Runner-up	Katarzyna Glinka	Stefano Terrazzino	38.76
7	18	Runner-up	Elżbieta Romanowska	Rafał Maserak	38.73
8	31	Runner-up	Magdalena Boczarska	Jacek Jeschke	38.69
9	18	5th	Izu Ugonoh	Hanna Żudziewicz	38.63
9	30	4th	Katarzyna Zillmann	Janja Lesar	38.63
10	12	4th	Patricia Kazadi	Łukasz Czarnecki	38.50
11	31	Champion	Gamou Fall	Hanna Żudziewicz	38.46
12	28	Champion	Vanessa Aleksander	Michał Bartkiewicz	38.40
13	18	Champion	Anna Karczmarczyk	Jacek Jeschke	38.38
14	16	Runner-up	Tatiana Okupnik	Tomasz Barański	38.28
15	17	Champion	Ewelina Lisowska	Tomasz Barański	38.26
16	10	Champion	Anna Mucha	Rafał Maserak	38.24
17	27	Runner-up	Roksana Węgiel	Michał Kassin	38.20
18	9	Champion	Dorota Gardias	Andrej Mosejcuk	38.06
19	14	Runner-up	Joanna Moro	Rafał Maserak	38.00
19	15	Runner-up	Anna Wyszkoni	Ján Kliment	38.00
19	19	Runner-up	Olga Kalicka	Rafał Maserak	38.00
20	31	Runner-up	Sebastian Fabijański	Julia Suryś	37.92
21	24	Runner-up	Julia Wieniawa	Stefano Terrazzino	37.90
22	11	Champion	Julia Kamińska	Rafał Maserak	37.88
23	6	3rd	Mateusz Damięcki	Ewa Szabatin	37.83
24	7	Champion	Magdalena Walach	Cezary Olszewski	37.82
25	31	Runner-up	Paulina Gałązka	Michał Bartkiewicz	37.77
26	6	Runner-up	Justyna Steczkowska	Stefano Terrazzino	37.67
27	8	3rd	Marta Żmuda Trzebiatowska	Adam Król	37.57
28	12	3rd	Edyta Górniak	Ján Kliment	37.50
29	27	Champion	Anita Sokołowska	Jacek Jeschke	37.33
30	12	Runner-up	Paweł Staliński	Izabela Janachowska	37.29
31	16	3rd	Julia Pogrebińska	Rafał Maserak	37.27
32	8	Runner-up	Natalia Lesz	Łukasz Czarnecki	37.24
33	28	Runner-up	Julia Żugaj	Wojciech Kucina	37.20
34	12	Champion	Monika Pyrek	Robert Rowiński	37.18
34	26	Runner-up	Jacek Jelonek	Michał Danilczuk	37.18
35	23	Runner-up	Barbara Kurdej-Szatan	Jacek Jeschke	37.16
32	5	Champion	Krzysztof Tyniec	Kamila Kajak	37.14
32	30	Runner-up	Maurycy Popiel	Sara Janicka	37.14
36	17	3rd	Cleo	Ján Kliment	37.07
37	8	Champion	Agata Kulesza	Stefano Terrazzino	37.06
38	22	Champion	Joanna Mazur	Ján Kliment	37.02
39	19	Champion	Robert Wabich	Hanna Żudziewicz	37.00
39	25	Runner-up	Magdalena Kajrowicz-Zapała	Rafał Maserak	37.00
39	26	4th	Natalia Janoszek	Rafał Maserak	37.00
40	12	6th	Maria Niklińska	Tomasz Barański	36.88
41	2	Champion	Katarzyna Cichopek	Marcin Hakiel	36.86
42	13	Runner-up	Bilguun Ariunbaatar	Janja Lesar	36.65
43	9	Runner-up	Bartłomiej Kasprzykowski	Blanka Winiarska	36.60
44	20	Champion	Natalia Szroeder	Ján Kliment	36.59
45	17	Runner-up	Łukasz Kadziewicz	Agnieszka Kaczorowska	36.53
45	23	3rd	Tamara Gonzalez-Perea	Rafał Maserak	36.53
45	20	Runner-up	Iwona Cichosz	Stefano Terrazino	36.53
45	26	Champion	Ilona Krawczyńska	Robert Rowiński	36.53

=== Lowest-scoring celebrities ===
The scores presented below represent the worst overall accumulative average scores the celebrity gained each season. Seasons where the scores were out of 30 have been rounded out of 40.

Rank	Season	Place	Celebrity	Professional	Average score
1	13	14th	Zbigniew Urbański	Izabela Janachowska	13.00
1	21	10th	Jarosław Kret	Lenka Klimentová	13.00
2	22	8th	Justyna Żyła	Tomasz Barański	14.93
3	26	10th	Krzysztof Rutkowski	Sylwia Madeńska	16.00
4	22	11th	Dominika Tajner-Wiśniewska	Wojciech Jeschke	16.67
5	10	11th	Iga Wyrwał	Łukasz Czarnecki	17.00
6	27	6th	Dagmara Kaźmierska	Marcin Hakiel	18.25
7	3	10th	Paolo Cozza	Kamila Drezno	18.50
7	21	11th	Antek Smykiewicz	Agnieszka Kaczorowska	18.50
8	24	10th	Tomasz Oświeciński	Janja Lesar / Wiktoria Omyła	19.11
9	23	4th	Magda Bereda	Kamil Kuroczko	19.85
10	14	11th	Jacek Lenartowicz	Paulina Biernat	20.00
10	16	10th	Norbert 'Norbi' Dudziuk	Nina Tyrka	20.00
10	24	11th	Marcin Bosak	Wiktoria Omyła	20.00
10	25	9th	Wojciech Węcławowicz	Paulina Biernat	20.00
11	11	10th	Przemysław Saleta	Izabela Janachowska	20.50
11	13	12th	Kazimierz Mazur	Bianka Żubrowska	20.50
12	12	11th	Anna Kalata	Krzysztof Hulboj	21.00
13	23	7th	Akop Szostak	Sara Janicka	21.07
14	14	9th	Karolina Szostak	Andrej Mosejcuk	21.33
15	27	12th	Adam Kszczot	Katarzyna Vu Manh	21.50
16	31	12th	Małgorzata Potocka	Mieszko Masłowski	22.00
17	9	8th	Francys Sudnicka	Łukasz Czarnecki	22.20
18	21	6th	Krzysztof Gojdź	Valeriya Zhuravlyova	22.33
19	27	8th	Kamil Baleja	Magdalena Perlińska	22.40
20	22	10th	Paweł Dudek	Valeriya Zhuravlyova	22.67
21	12	13th	Agnieszka Jaskółka	Rafał Maserak	23.00
21	27	11th	Małgorzata Ostrowska-Królikowska	Kamil Gwara	23.00
21	28	11th	Michał Meyer	Klaudia Rąba	23.00
22	8	10th	Ilona Felicjańska	Robert Kochanek	23.25
23	24	6th	Bogdan Kalus	Lenka Klimentová	23.43
24	29	11th	Cezary Trybański	Izabela Skierska	23.50
25	9	6th	Paweł Nastula	Magdalena Soszyńska-Michno	23.57
26	13	5th	Michał Szpak	Paulina Biernat	23.60
27	24	7th	Mikołaj Jędruszczak	Sylwia Madeńska	23.62
28	5	8th	Rafał Olbrychski	Ewa Szabatin	24.00
28	8	13th	Anna Popek	Cezary Olszewski	24.00
28	13	8th	Aleksandra Kisio	Łukasz Czarnecki	24.00
28	19	11th	Tomasz Ciachorowski	Natalia Głębocka	24.00
28	20	9th	Tomasz Zimoch	Paulina Biernat	24.00
28	23	10th	Rafał Szatan	Lenka Klimentová	24.00
28	27	10th	Beata Olga Kowalska	Mieszko Masłowski	24.00
29	9	9th	Marcin Chochlew	Janja Lesar	24.25
30	24	9th	Nicole Bogdanowicz	Kamil Kuroczko	24.27

=== Professionals with the Most Wins ===
Professional	Wins
Stefano Terrazzino	4
Ján Kliment	3
Jacek Jeschke	3
Hanna Żudziewicz-Jeschke	3
Michał Bartkiewicz	2
Kamila Kajak-Mosejcuk	2
Rafał Maserak	2
Robert Rowiński	2

== Specials ==
=== The All-Time Final ===
==== Couples ====
Celebrity	Occupation	Professional partner	Season	Status
Witold Paszt	Singer	Anna Głogowska	1 (runner-up)	Eliminated 1
Olivier Janiak	TV Presenter	Kamila Kajak	1 (winner)	Eliminated 2
Małgorzata Foremniak	Actress	Rafał Maserak	2 (runner-up)	Eliminated 3
Aleksandra Kwaśniewska	Daughter of the former Polish president Aleksander Kwaśniewski	Michał Skawiński	3 (runner-up)	Third Place
Rafał Mroczek	Actor	Aneta Piotrowska	3 (winner)	Second Place
Katarzyna Cichopek	Actress, TV Presenter	Marcin Hakiel	2 (winner)	Winners

==== Scores ====
Team	Part 1	Part 2	Part 3
Katarzyna & Marcin	40+40=80	40+40=80	40
Rafał & Aneta	36+38=74	40+40=80	40
Aleksandra & Michał	37+39=76	38+39=77	Eliminated
Małgorzata & Rafał	40+39=79	39+39=78	Eliminated
Olivier & Kamila	32+40=72	Eliminated	
Witold & Anna	34+36=70	Eliminated	

Opening: "Everybody Needs Somebody to Love" – Solomon Burke (Group VOLT)

Running order

Couple	Score	Style	Music
Olivier & Kamila	32 (7,8,9,8)	Paso Doble	"Cancion del Mariachi" – Antonio Banderas
Olivier & Kamila	40 (10,10,10,10)	Quickstep	"Billy-A-Dick" – Bette Midler
Olivier & Kamila	-	Rumba	"Bésame Mucho" – The Beatles
Olivier & Kamila	-	Foxtrot	"Have You Met Miss Jones?" – Frank Sinatra
Olivier & Kamila	-	Freestyle	"Polskie drogi" – theme song
Małgorzata & Rafał	40 (10,10,10,10)	Waltz	"Dumka na dwa serca" – Edyta Górniak & Mieczysław Szcześniak
Małgorzata & Rafał	39 (9,10,10,10)	Jive	"Hafanana" – Afric Simone
Małgorzata & Rafał	39 (9,10,10,10)	Tango	"Money, Money, Money" – ABBA
Małgorzata & Rafał	39 (9,10,10,10)	Rumba	"Endless Love" – Lionel Richie
Małgorzata & Rafał	-	Freestyle	"Free Your Mind" – En Vogue
Witold & Anna	34 (7,9,9,9)	Jive	"Hit the Road Jack" – Ray Charles
Witold & Anna	36 (7,10,10,9)	Waltz	"Three Times a Lady" – The Commodores
Witold & Anna	-	Paso Doble	"El Conquistador" – Jose Esparza
Witold & Anna	-	Tango	"My Heart Belongs To Daddy" – Marilyn Monroe
Witold & Anna	-	Freestyle	"Money, Money" – from Cabaret
Rafał & Aneta	36 (8,10,10,8)	Quickstep	"Wonderwall" – Oasis
Rafał & Aneta	38 (9,10,10,9)	Samba	"Mujer Latina" – Thalía
Rafał & Aneta	40 (10,10,10,10)	Waltz	"Sunrise, Sunset" from "Fiddler on the Roof"
Rafał & Aneta	40 (10,10,10,10)	Jive	"Help!" – The Beatles
Rafał & Aneta	40 (10,10,10,10)	Freestyle	"Cry – Michael Jackson "Black or White" – Michael Jackson
Aleksandra & Michał	37 (8,9,10,10)	Paso Doble	"Pieśń o małym rycerzu" – Wojciech Kilar (Theme from "Przygody pana Michała")
Aleksandra & Michał	39 (9,10,10,10)	Quickstep	"Puttin' on the Ritz" – Fred Astaire
Aleksandra & Michał	38 (8,10,10,10)	Tango	"The Phantom of the Opera" from "The Phantom of the Opera"
Aleksandra & Michał	39 (9,10,10,10)	Rumba	"Nine Million Bicycles" – Katie Melua
Aleksandra & Michał	-	Freestyle	"I Will Always Love You" – Whitney Houston "Queen of the Night" – Whitney Houston
Katarzyna & Marcin	40 (10,10,10,10)	Waltz	"He Was Beautiful" – Stanley Myers
Katarzyna & Marcin	40 (10,10,10,10)	Cha-cha-cha	"Sway" – Pablo Beltrán Ruiz
Katarzyna & Marcin	40 (10,10,10,10)	Rumba	"Wonderful Life" – Black
Katarzyna & Marcin	40 (10,10,10,10)	Tango	Moulin Rouge – El Tango De Roxanne
Katarzyna & Marcin	40 (10,10,10,10)	Freestyle	"(I've Had) The Time of My Life" – Bill Medley & Jennifer Warnes "Do You Love Me" – The Contours
Małgorzata & Rafał; Aleksandra & Michał; Witold & Anna; Olivier & Kamila; Rafał & Aneta; Katarzyna & Marcin	-	Group Viennese Waltz	"I Have Nothing" – Whitney Houston

==== Dance Chart ====
Couple	Part 1		Part 2		Part 3
Katarzyna & Marcin	Waltz	Cha Cha Cha	Tango	Rumba	Freestyle
Rafał & Aneta	Quickstep	Samba	Waltz	Jive	Freestyle
Aleksandra & Michał	Paso Doble	Quickstep	Tango	Rumba	Eliminated
Małgorzata & Rafał	Waltz	Jive	Tango	Rumba	Eliminated
Olivier & Kamila	Paso Doble	Quickstep	Eliminated		
Witold & Anna	Jive	Waltz	Eliminated		

=== Dancing on Tour ===
In May and June 2006, Seasons 1-3 participants went on a tour around Poland with a specially prepared dance show. The gig was called Dancing with the Stars – Dancing in your city (Taniec z Gwiazdami – Taniec w twoim Mieście). The pairs featured in the tour:

- Agnieszka Rylik (female boxer) and Marcin Olszewski,
- Małgorzata Foremniak (actress) and Rafał Maserak,
- Aleksandra Kwaśniewska (daughter of former Polish president Aleksander Kwaśniewski) and Michał Skawińśki,
- Katarzyna Cichopek (actress) and Marcin Hakiel,
- Rafał Mroczek (actor) and Aneta Piotrowska,
- Conrado Moreno (showman) and Magda Soszyńska,
- Piotr Gąsowski (actor) and Anna Głogowska.

=== 'Best Of' episode ===
On 13 May 2007, TVN aired a special episode of Taniec z Gwiazdami – Najpiękniejsze tańce. This time, the audience was choosing the best dance from previous seasons. The jury went dancing too and was being judged by a special one-night panel of Kuba Wojewódzki (TV personality), Szymon Majewski (comedian and TV host), and Kazimiera Szczuka (literary critic and historian, feminist, writer, host of the Polish version of The Weakest Link). The pairs performing in this episode were:

- Joanna Jabłczyńska (actress) and Piotr Kiszka (Waltz)
- Joanna Liszowska (actress) and Robert Kochanek (Samba)
- Przemysław Sadowski (actor) and Ewa Szabatin (Jive)
- Aleksandra Kwaśniewska (daughter of the former president of Poland Aleksander Kwaśniewski) and Michał Skawiński (Tango)
- Krzysztof Tyniec (actor, cabaretman) and Kamila Kajak (Foxtrot)
- Kinga Rusin (TVN presenter) and Stefano Terrazino (Rumba)

Place	No	Star	Dancer	Dance	Music	%
1.	4	Kinga Rusin	Stefano Terrazzino	Rumba	"A Whiter Shade of Pale" — Procol Harum	28,29%
2.	5	Krzysztof Tyniec	Kamila Kajak	Foxtrot	"Singin' in the Rain" – Gene Kelly	19,4%
3.	3	Aleksandra Kwaśniewska	Michał Skawiński	Tango	"The Phantom of the Opera" – The Phantom of the Opera	19,01%
4.	6	Przemysław Sadowski	Ewa Szabatin	Jive	"If I Had a Hammer" — Lee Hays	15,93%
5.	2	Joanna Liszowska	Robert Kochanek	Samba	"Conga" — Gloria Estefan	13,05%
6.	1	Joanna Jabłczyńska	Piotr Kiszka	Waltz	"Michelle" — The Beatles	4,31%.

=== Po prostu taniec (Just Dance!) ===
On 9 December 2007 TVN aired a special episode of Po Prostu taniec - So You Think You Can Dance and Taniec z Gwiazdami. 4 participants of 6th season of Taniec z Gwiazdami and four dancers of 1st season of So You Think You Can Dance have danced.

- Judges:
  - Augustin Egurrolla – So You Think You Can Dance
  - Michał Piróg – So You Think You Can Dance
  - Iwona Pavlović – Dancing with the Stars
  - Piotr Galiński – Dancing with the Stars
- Presenters:
  - Kinga Rusin – So You Think You Can Dance
  - Katarzyna Skrzynecka – Dancing with the Stars
  - Piotr Gąsowski – Dancing with the Stars
- Musical Guests:
  - Isis Gee

No	Team	Dance	Music	Points jury	Place
1	Rafał Bryndal & Diana Staniszewska	Jive	"I Get Around" – Beach Boys	18 (5,5,4,4)	4. place
1	Rafał Bryndal & Diana Staniszewska	Pop	"Thriller" – Michael Jackson	31 (5,6,10,10)	4. place
2	Anna Guzik & Rafał Kamiński	Tango	"Libertango" – Ástor Piazzolla	24 (7,5,6,6)	1. place
2	Anna Guzik & Rafał Kamiński	Hip-Hop	"Yeah" – Usher	39 (9,10,10,10)	1. place
3	Mateusz Damięcki & Anna Bosak	Waltz	"Imagine" - John Lennon	34 (7,8,9,10)	2. place
3	Mateusz Damięcki & Anna Bosak	Jazz	"When You're Gone" - Avril Lavigne	33 (8,10,7,8)	2. place
4	Justyna Steczkowska & Maciej Florek	Tango	"Et Si Tu N'Existais Pas" – Toto Cutugno & Delanoë	17 (4,5,5,3)	3. place
4	Justyna Steczkowska & Maciej Florek	Modern	"Bring me to life" – Evanescence	39 (9,10,10,10)	3. place

Audience voting results

Anna & Rafał
Mateusz & Anna
Justyna & Maciej
Rafał & Diana

=== Guinness World record ===
On 31 August 2008 in Kraków, the Guinness World Record was achieved. Augustin Egurolla (You Can Dance judge) and Iwona Pavlović (DWTS judge) were teaching 1635 people how to dance cha-cha-cha.

Stars from Dancing with the Stars

Star	Dancer	Dance
Anna Guzik (6th Season Winner)	Łukasz Czarnecki	Salsa
Isis Gee (6th Season)	Żora Korolyov	Cha-cha-cha
Mariusz Pudzianowski (7th Season Runner-Up)	Magdalena Soszyńska-Michno	Argentine Tango
Tomasz Schimscheiner (7th Season)	Kamila Kajak	Waltz

Dancers from So You Think You Can Dance"

- 1st season: Maciej Florek, Maria Foryś, Ida Nowakowska, Piotr Gałczyk oraz Mariusz Jasuwienas
- 2nd season: Artur Cieciórski, Katarzyna Kubalska, Gieorgij Puchalski, Anna Radomska i Justyna Białowąs
- Musical guests:
  - Matt Pokora – "Catch Me If You Can," "Through the eyes," "Dangerous"
  - Patrycja Markowska – "Świat się pomylił"

== Rating figures ==
Ratings figures by episode and season on TVN
Episode	I Season	II Season	III Season	IV Season	V Season	VI Season	VII Season	VIII Season	IX Season	X Season	XI Season	XII Season	XIII Season
1	2 889 087 (16 April 2005)	4 363 854 (11 September 2005)	6 895 176 (5 March 2006)	5 985 982 (10 September 2006)	5 028 912 (4 March 2007)	5 425 324 (9 September 2007)	5 256 123 (2 March 2008)	4 295 811 (7 September 2008)	4 319 529 (8 March 2009)	4 628 285 (6 September 2009)	4 577 667 (7 March 2010)	4 261 993 (5 September 2010)	4 286 482 (4 September 2011)
2	3 631 027 (23 April 2005)	4 069 941 (18 September 2005)	6 997 775 (12 March 2006)	6 035 684 (17 September 2006)	5 417 743 (11 March 2007)	5 269 482 (16 September 2007)	5 237 203 (9 March 2008)	4 481 064 (14 September 2008)	4 149 096 (15 March 2009)	3 785 949 (13 September 2009)	4 670 450 (14 March 2010)	4 293 571 (12 September 2010)	4 081 186 (11 September 2011)
3	3 341 743 (30 April 2005)	4 047 240 (2 October 2005)	7 247 603 (19 March 2006)	6 175 603 (24 September 2006)	5 164 393 (18 March 2007)	4 965 785 (23 September 2007)	5 034 347 (16 March 2008)	4 699 663 (21 September 2008)	4 136 099 (22 March 2009)	4 498 035 (20 September 2009)	4 633 925 (21 March 2010)	4 352 478 (19 September 2010)	3 960 975 (18 September 2011)
4	3 360 527 (7 May 2005)	4 158 432 (16 October 2005)	7 096 456 (26 March 2006)	6 175 212 (1 October 2006)	5 119 496 (25 March 2007)	4 907 646 (30 September 2007)	4 222 470 (23 March 2008)	4 439 893 (28 September 2008)	4 091 280 (29 March 2009)	4 842 243 (27 September 2009)	4 480 723 (28 March 2010)	4 118 160 (26 September 2010)	4 120 271 (25 September 2011)
5	3 391 588 (14 May 2005)	4 311 679 (30 October 2005)	6 740 146 (9 April 2006)	6 503 560 (8 October 2006)	4 753 618 (1 April 2007)	4 868 410 (7 October 2007)	4 904 038 (30 March 2008)	5 029 136 (5 October 2008)	3 916 182 (5 April 2009)	4 367 128 (4 October 2009)	3 848 158 (4 April 2010)	4 345 232 (3 October 2010)	3 802 996 (2 October 2011)
6	3 425 985 (21 May 2005)	4 812 545 (6 November 2005)	5 397 241 (16 April 2006)	6 499 586 (15 October 2006)	4 332 760 (8 April 2007)	4 789 419 (14 October 2007)	4 693 681 (6 April 2008)	4 420 153 (12 October 2008)	3 080 254 (12 April 2009)	4 952 120 (11 October 2009)	4 041 457 (25 April 2010)	4 644 528 (10 October 2010)	3 539 262 (9 October 2011)
7	2 901 281 (28 May 2005)	4 876 285 (13 November 2005)	6 613 159 (23 April 2006)	6 371 524 (22 October 2006)	4 509 445 (15 April 2007)	4 710 523 (21 October 2007)	4 452 588 (13 April 2008)	5 082 535 (19 October 2008)	3 644 024 (19 April 2009)	5 059 740 (18 October 2009)	3 710 595 (2 May 2010)	4 868 327 (17 October 2010)	3 824 196 (16 October 2011)
8	3 879 102 (4 June 2005)	5 650 915 (20 November 2005)	6 020 520 (30 April 2006)	6 593 505 (29 October 2006)	4 606 325 (22 April 2007)	5 051 129 (28 October 2007)	4 704 676 (20 April 2008)	4 739 194 (26 October 2008)	3 224 559 (26 April 2009)	4 779 107 (25 October 2009)	3 981 377 (9 May 2010)	4 676 420 (24 October 2010)	4 120 223 (23 October 2011)
9	–	5 938 148 (27 November 2005)	6 656 151 (7 May 2006)	6 764 410 (5 November 2006)	4 621 309 (29 April 2007)	5 702 785 (4 November 2007)	4 483 703 (27 April 2008)	4 780 743 (2 November 2008)	3 421 426 (3 May 2009)	4 933 441 (8 November 2009)	4 363 045 (16 May 2010)	4 356 524 (31 October 2010)	4 181 987 (30 October 2011)
10	–	7 743 241 (4 December 2005)	7 401 241 (14 May 2006)	6 917 683 (12 November 2006)	5 601 889 (6 May 2007)	5 711 799 (11 November 2007)	4 673 942 (4 May 2008)	4 481 183 (9 November 2008)	3 484 505 (10 May 2009)	5 220 602 (15 November 2009)	4 021 094 (23 May 2010)	4 697 868 (7 November 2010)	3 990 285 (6 November 2011)
11	–	–	–	–	–	5 822 995 (18 November 2007)	4 178 707 (11 May 2008)	4 969 114 (16 November 2008)	3 852 979 (17 May 2009)	5 331 116 (22 November 2009)	3 777 830 (30 May 2010)	4 970 335 (14 November 2010)	4 226 253 (13 November 2011)
12	–	–	–	–	–	6 614 399 (25 November 2007)	4 494 322 (18 May 2008)	5 005 415 (23 November 2008)	–	6 248 429 (29 November 2009)	4 575 752 (13 June 2010)	4 998 573 (21 November 2010)	4 574 627 (20 November 2011)
13	–	–	–	–	–	–	5 170 269 (25 May 2008)	5 352 000 (30 November 2008)	–	–	–	5 694 227 (28 November 2010)	4 709 919 (27 November 2011)
Average	3 375 275	5 001 238	6 743 493	6 389 535	4 949 989	5 329 070	4 731 236	4 752 337	3 802 880	4 864 325	4 269 697	4 625 858	4 094 982

Ratings figures by episode and season on Polsat
Episode	XIV Season	XV Season	XVI Season	XVII Season	XVIII Season	XIX Season	XX Season	XXI Season	XXII Season	XXIII Season	XXIV Season	XXV Season	XXVI Season	XXVII Season	XXVIII Season	XXIX Season	XXX Season	XXXI Season	XXXII Season
1	3 819 856 (7 March 2014)	3 319 486 (5 September 2014)	3 513 198 (6 March 2015)	3 119 775 (11 September 2015)	2 856 323 (4 March 2016)	2 670 864 (2 September 2016)	2 286 955 (3 March 2017)	3 130 450 (2 March 2018)	3 053 228 (1 March 2019)	2 128 753 (13 September 2019)	1 893 503 (6 March 2020)	1 852 606 (30 August 2021)	1 251 903 (29 August 2022)	1 894 094 (3 March 2024)	(15 September 2024)	(2 March 2025)	(14 September 2025)	(1 March 2026)	[6 September 2026]
2	3 552 522 (14 March 2014)	3 184 963 (12 September 2014)	3 313 965 (13 March 2015)	3 136 721 (18 September 2015)	3 004 968 (11 March 2016)	2 598 673 (9 September 2016)	2 371 369 (10 March 2017)	3 050 786 (9 March 2018)	2 461 784 (8 March 2019)	2 061 030 (20 September 2019)	1 965 091 (13 March 2020)	1 105 216 (6 September 2021)	1 230 526 (5 September 2022)	1 868 253 (10 March 2024)	(22 September 2024)	(9 March 2025)	(21 September 2025)	(8 March 2026)	[13 September 2026]
3	3 722 358 (21 March 2014)	3 238 614 (19 September 2014)	3 291 148 (20 March 2015)	3 447 225 (25 September 2015)	2 985 182 (18 March 2016)	2 792 135 (16 September 2016)	2 598 483 (17 March 2017)	3 104 801 (16 March 2018)	2 506 667 (15 March 2019)	2 113 472 (27 September 2019)	1 435 388 (4 September 2020)	1 340 496 (13 September 2021)	1 188 455 (12 September 2022)	1 861 462 (17 March 2024)	(29 September 2024)	(16 March 2025)	(28 September 2025)	[15 March 2026]	[20 September 2026]
4	4 090 934 (28 March 2014)	3 531 712 (26 September 2014)	3 280 674 (27 March 2015)	3 457 870 (2 October 2015)	2 839 764 (1 April 2016)	2 895 818 (23 September 2016)	2 568 147 (24 March 2017)	2 637 679 (23 March 2018)	2 810 446 (22 March 2019)	2 045 609 (4 October 2019)	1 669 344 (11 September 2020)	(20 September 2021)	978 046 (19 September 2022)	1 892 267 (24 March 2024)	(6 October 2024)	(23 March 2025)	(5 October 2025)	[22 March 2026]	[27 September 2026]
5	3 728 753 (4 April 2014)	3 836 941 (3 October 2014)	3 146 447 (10 April 2015)	3 151 611 (9 October 2015)	2 603 323 (8 April 2016)	2 793 907 (30 September 2016)	2 749 566 (31 March 2017)	2 363 373 (6 April 2018)	2 439 087 (29 March 2019)	2 161 947 (11 October 2019)	1 672 948 (18 September 2020)	(27 September 2021)	1 155 062 (26 September 2022)	1 441 117 (31 March 2024)	(13 October 2024)	(30 March 2025)	(12 October 2025)	[29 March 2026]	[4 October 2026]
6	3 516 767 (11 April 2014)	3 638 255 (10 October 2014)	3 284 017 (17 April 2015)	3 311 635 (16 October 2015)	2 938 911 (16 April 2016)	3 072 937 (7 October 2016)	2 444 888 (7 April 2017)	2 351 841 (13 April 2018)	2 473 422 (5 April 2019)	2 263 082 (18 October 2019)	1 832 806 (25 September 2020)	(4 October 2021)	1 096 323 (3 October 2022)	1 456 566 (7 April 2024)	(20 October 2024)	(6 April 2025)	(19 October 2025)	[5 Aprii 2026]	[11 October 2026]
7	3 120 514 (25 April 2014)	3 756 147 (17 October 2014)	3 107 330 (24 April 2015)	3 489 039 (23 October 2015)	2 817 648 (22 April 2016)	3 125 450 (14 October 2016)	3 207 466 (21 April 2017)	2 320 371 (20 April 2018)	2 481 900 (12 April 2019)	2 473 992 (25 October 2019)	1 839 253 (2 October 2020)	(11 October 2021)	1 144 489 (10 October 2022)	1 872 912 (14 April 2024)	(27 October 2024)	(13 April 2025)	(26 October 2025)	[12 Apii 2026]	[18 October 2026]
8	3 278 548 (2 May 2014)	3 580 026 (24 October 2014)	2 963 385 (1 May 2015)	3 427 794 (30 October 2015)	2 837 022 (29 April 2016)	2 946 185 (21 October 2016)	2 886 073 (28 April 2017)	2 328 269 (27 April 2018)	2 149 230 (26 April 2019)	2 176 552 (8 November 2019)	1 832 806 (9 October 2020)	1 425 639 (18 October 2021)	1 029 668 (17 October 2022)	1 807 948 (21 April 2024)	(3 November 2024)	(27 April 2025)	(2 November 2025)	[19 Apil 2026]	[25 October 2026]
9	3 336 610 (9 May 2014)	3 687 710 (31 October 2014)	2 975 085 (8 May 2015)	3 774 114 (6 November 2014)	2 921 546 (6 May 2015)	2 981 345 (28 October 2016)	2 626 691 (5 May 2017)	2 041 094 (4 May 2018)	2 263 521 (3 May 2019)	2 345 736 (15 November 2019)	1 832 806 (16 October 2020)	1 383 576 (25 October 2021)	1 087 378 (24 October 2022)	1 673 145 (28 April 2024)	(10 November 2024)	(4 May 2025)	(9 November 2025)	[26 Apil 2026]	[2 November 2026]
10	3 696 914 (16 May 2014)	3 980 107 (7 November 2014)	2 993 132 (15 May 2015)	3 568 550 (13 November 2015)	3 036 144 (13 May 2015)	3 297 409 (4 November 2016)	2 885 999 (12 May 2017)	2 549 063 (11 May 2018)	2 275 451 (10 May 2019)	2 653 257 (22 November 2019)	2 043 568 (23 October 2020)	–	1 209 293 (31 October 2022)	1 937 399 (5 May 2024)	2 110 000 (17 November 2024)	(11 May 2025)	(16 November 2025)	[3 May 2026]	[9 November 2026]
11	3 538 174 (23 May 2014)	4 533 381 (14 November 2014)	3 620 176 (22 May 2015)	–	–	–	–	–	2 599 730 (17 May 2019)	-	-	-	-	-	-	-	-	-	-
Average	3 581 995	3 662 489	3 234 655	3 383 995	2 886 204	2 913 881	2 657 187	2 599 740	2 506 601	2 244 954	1 742 112	1 346 110	1 137 114	1 784 502	1 640 000	1 750 000	2 050 000	1 810 000	
