= Taniec z gwiazdami season 25 =

Polish TV show

Taniec z gwiazdami
- Season 25
- Hosted by: Krzysztof Ibisz; Paulina Sykut-Jeżyna
- Judges: Andrzej Piaseczny; Iwona Pavlović; Michał Malitowski; Andrzej Grabowski
- Celebrity winner: Piotr Mróz
- Professional winner: Hanna Żudziewicz
- No. of episodes: 9

Release
- Original network: Polsat
- Original release: 30 August – 25 October 2021

Season chronology
- ← Previous; Season 24 Next → Season 26

The 25th season of Taniec z gwiazdami, the Polish edition of Dancing with the Stars, started on 30 August 2021. This was the twelfth season aired on Polsat. For the first time show was aired on Mondays. Krzysztof Ibisz, Paulina Sykut-Jeżyna and new presenter Izabela Janachowska was the hosts. Iwona Pavlović, Michał Malitowski and Andrzej Grabowski returned as judges while Andrzej Piaseczny joined as the fourth judge.

On 25 October, Piotr Mróz and his partner Hanna Żudziewicz were crowned the champions.

== Couples ==
Celebrity	Notability	Professional partner	Status	Source(s)
Denis Urubko	Mountaineer	Janja Lesar	Eliminated 1st on 30 August 2021	
Wojciech Węcławowicz	Pentathlete and influencer known as Fit Oldboy	Paulina Biernat	Eliminated 2nd on 6 September 2021	
Radosław Liszewski	Weekend singer	Lenka Klimentová	Eliminated 3rd on 13 September 2021	
Izabela Małysz	Adam Małysz's wife	Stefano Terrazzino	Eliminated 4th on 20 September 2021	
Kinga Sawczuk	Social media personality	Jakub Lipowski	Eliminated 5th on 27 September 2021	
Łukasz Jurkowski	Sports commentator and Ninja Warrior Polska host	Wiktoria Omyła	Eliminated 6th on 4 October 2021	
Sylwia Bomba	Gogglebox. Przed telewizorem star	Jacek Jeschke	Eliminated 7th on 11 October 2021	
Oliwia Bieniuk	Photomodel and Anna Przybylska's daughter	Michał Bartkiewicz	Third Place on 18 October 2021	
Magdalena Kajrowicz-Zapała	Actress and singer	Rafał Maserak	Runners-up on 25 October 2021	
Piotr Mróz	Gliniarze actor	Hanna Żudziewicz	Winners on 25 October 2021	

== Scores ==
Couple	Place	1	2	3	4	5	6	7	8		9
Piotr & Hanna	1	31†	33†	35+8=43	28+40=68	40†	36+40=76†	34+39=73	33+40=73	—	37+39+40=116
Magdalena & Rafał	2	30	30	40+5=45†	36+34=70	35+3=38	34+40=74	40+38=78†	39+40=79†	+40=119†	37+39+40=116
Oliwia & Michał	3	28	19‡	25+3=28	31+34=65	27‡	23+25=48‡	29+28=57	28+32=60‡	+32=92‡	
Sylwia & Jacek	4	28	22	27+2=29	24+34=58‡	29+3=32	25+36=61	26+30=56‡			
Łukasz & Wiktoria	5	27	25	29+7=36	25+40=65	31+3=34	25+33=58				
Kinga & Jakub	6	30	32	33+6=39	32+40=72†	31					
Izabela & Stefano	7	25	25	22+1=23‡	26+40=66						
Radosław & Lenka	8	26	26	24+4=28							
Wojciech & Paulina	9	20‡	20								
Denis & Janja	10	25									

Red numbers indicate the lowest score for each week.
Green numbers indicate the highest score for each week.
indicates the couple eliminated that week.
indicates the returning couple that finished in the bottom two or three.
indicates the couple saved from elimination by immunity.
indicates the winning couple.
indicates the runner-up.
indicates the couple in third place.
indicates the couple withdrew from the competition.

== Average score chart ==
This table only counts for dances scored on a 40-points scale.

Rank by average	Place	Couple	Total points	Number of dances	Average
1	2	Magdalena & Rafał	592	16	37.0
2	1	Piotr & Hanna	545	15	36.3
3	6	Kinga & Jakub	198	6	33.0
4	5	Łukasz & Wiktoria	235	8	29.4
5	4	Sylwia & Jacek	281	10	28.1
6	3	Oliwia & Michał	361	13	27.8
7	7	Izabela & Stefano	138	5	27.6
8	8	Radosław & Lenka	76	3	25.3
9	10	Denis & Janja	25	1	25.0
10	9	Wojciech & Paulina	40	2	20.0

== Highest and lowest scoring performances ==
The best and worst performances in each dance according to the judges' 40-point scale:

Dance	Best dancer(s)	Highest score	Worst dancer(s)	Lowest score
Quickstep	Magdalena Kajrowicz-Zapała	40	Oliwia Bieniuk	19
Waltz	Piotr Mróz	40	Izabela Małysz	25
Jive	Piotr Mróz	39	Sylwia Bomba	22
Cha-cha-cha	Piotr Mróz	39	Wojciech Węcławowicz	20
Tango	Piotr Mróz	40	Izabela Małysz	26
Samba	Kinga Sawczuk	30	Izabela Małysz	22
Viennese Waltz	Kinga Sawczuk	32	Wojciech Węcławowicz	20
Rumba	Magdalena Kajrowicz-Zapała; Piotr Mróz	40	Łukasz Jurkowski; Izabela Małysz	25
Foxtrot	Sylwia Bomba	36	Sylwia Bomba	27
Contemporary	Piotr Mróz	37	Kinga Sawczuk	32
Charleston	Magdalena Kajrowicz-Zapała	35		
Swing	Oliwia Bieniuk	32	Oliwia Bieniuk	23
Paso Doble	Magdalena Kajrowicz-Zapała	39	Piotr Mróz	36
Hip-hop	Sylwia Bomba	26		
Salsa	Magdalena Kajrowicz-Zapała	40	Oliwia Bieniuk	28
Disco	Piotr Mróz	34		
Bollywood	Oliwia Bieniuk	29		
Mambo Marathon	Piotr Mróz	8	Izabela Małysz	1
Team Dance	Łukasz Jurkowski; Izabela Małysz; Piotr Mróz; Kinga Sawczuk	40	Magdalena Kajrowicz-Zapała; Sylwia Bomba; Oliwia Bieniuk	34
Freestyle	Magdalena Kajrowicz-Zapała; Piotr Mróz	40		

== Couples' highest and lowest scoring dances ==
According to the 40-point scale:

Couples	Highest scoring dance(s)	Lowest scoring dance(s)
Piotr & Hanna	Team Dance, Rumba, Waltz, Tango, Freestyle (40)	Tango (28)
Magdalena & Rafał	Rumba (3x), Salsa, Quickstep, Freestyle (40)	Quickstep, Waltz (30)
Oliwia & Michał	Team Dance (34)	Quickstep (19)
Sylwia & Jacek	Foxtrot (36)	Jive (22)
Łukasz & Wiktoria	Team Dance (40)	Rumba, Samba, Cha-cha-cha (25)
Kinga & Jakub	Team Dance (40)	Samba (30)
Izabela & Stefano	Team Dance (40)	Samba (22)
Radosław & Lenka	Cha-cha-cha, Samba (26)	Quickstep (24)
Wojciech & Paulina	Cha-cha-cha, Viennese Waltz (20)	Cha-cha-cha, Viennese Waltz (20)
Denis & Janja	Viennese Waltz (25)	Viennese Waltz (25)

== Weekly scores ==
Unless indicated otherwise, individual judges scores in the charts below (given in parentheses) are listed in this order from left to right: Andrzej Piaseczny, Iwona Pavlović, Michał Malitowski and Andrzej Grabowski.

=== Week 1: Season Premiere ===
Running order

Couple	Score	Dance	Music	Result
Łukasz & Wiktoria	27 (9,6,5,7)	Quickstep	"Despacito"—Luis Fonsi & Daddy Yankee	Safe
Izabela & Stefano	25 (9,4,4,8)	Waltz	"Orła cień"—Varius Manx	Safe
Piotr & Hanna	31 (9,7,7,8)	Jive	"The Heat Is On"—Glenn Frey	Safe
Magdalena & Rafał	30 (9,7,6,8)	Quickstep	"Miłość w Zakopanem"—Sławomir	Safe
Wojciech & Paulina	20 (9,2,3,6)	Cha-cha-cha	"I'm Too Sexy"—Right Said Fred	Safe
Sylwia & Jacek	28 (9,5,6,8)	Tango	"Sex Bomb"—Tom Jones	Safe
Radosław & Lenka	26 (9,5,5,7)	Cha-cha-cha	"You're My Heart, You're My Soul"—Modern Talking	Safe
Kinga & Jakub	30 (9,6,7,8)	Samba	"Iko Iko (My Bestie)"—Justin Wellington feat. Small Jam	Safe
Denis & Janja	25 (9,3,5,8)	Viennese Waltz	"Ochi chyornye"—Violetta Villas	Eliminated
Oliwia & Michał	28 (9,5,6,8)	Cha-cha-cha	"Szampan"—Sanah	Safe

=== Week 2: Love Night ===
Running order

Couple	Score	Dance	Music	Result
Piotr & Hanna	33 (10,8,6,9)	Waltz	"Wielka miłość"—Seweryn Krajewski	Safe
Sylwia & Jacek	22 (7,4,4,7)	Jive	"Marry You"—Bruno Mars	Safe
Wojciech & Paulina	20 (8,3,3,6)	Viennese Waltz	"Chodź, przytul, przebacz"—Andrzej Piaseczny	Eliminated
Oliwia & Michał	19 (7,3,4,5)	Quickstep	"Crazy in Love"—Beyoncé feat. Jay Z	Safe
Łukasz & Wiktoria	25 (8,5,5,7)	Rumba	"Shallow"—Lady Gaga & Bradley Cooper	Safe
Kinga & Jakub	32 (9,8,7,8)	Viennese Waltz	"Perfect"—Ed Sheeran	Safe
Radosław & Lenka	26 (7,6,6,7)	Samba	"All That She Wants"—Ace of Base	Safe
Magdalena & Rafał	30 (9,7,6,8)	Waltz	"Oczarowanie"—Zbigniew Wodecki	Safe
Izabela & Stefano	25 (7,6,4,8)	Rumba	"Un-Break My Heart"—Toni Braxton	Safe

=== Week 3: Hometown Glory ===
Running order

Couple	Score	Dance	Music	Result
Kinga & Jakub	33 (9,8,7,9)	Cha-cha-cha	"Bez Ciebie"—Dawid Kwiatkowski	Safe
Oliwia & Michał	25 (9,4,5,7)	Viennese Waltz	"When a Man Loves a Woman"—Percy Sledge	Safe
Piotr & Hanna	35 (10,9,7,9)	Cha-cha-cha	"Pod wiatr"—Grzegorz Hyży	Safe
Sylwia & Jacek	27 (8,6,5,8)	Foxtrot	"I Want It That Way"—Backstreet Boys	Safe
Izabela & Stefano	22 (8,3,3,8)	Samba	"(I'll Never Be) Maria Magdalena"—Sandra	Safe
Łukasz & Wiktoria	29 (9,7,5,8)	Viennese Waltz	"Sen o Warszawie"—Czesław Niemen	Safe
Magdalena & Rafał	40 (10,10,10,10)	Rumba	"Nie żałuję"—Edyta Geppert	Safe
Radosław & Lenka	24 (8,3,5,8)	Quickstep	"Joyride"—Roxette	Eliminated
Piotr & Hanna; Łukasz & Wiktoria; Kinga & Jakub; Magdalena & Rafał; Radosław & Lenka; Oliwia & Michał; Sylwia & Jacek; Izabela & Stefano	8; 7; 6; 5; 4; 3; 2; 1	Mambo; Marathon	"Mambo Italiano"—Rosemary Clooney	

=== Week 4: You Decide! ===
Couples performed one unlearned dance to music selected by the general public on social media.

Running order

Couple	Score	Dance	Music	Result
Sylwia & Jacek	24 (8,4,5,7)	Cha-cha-cha	"Kocham"—Cleo	Safe
Piotr & Hanna	28 (7,5,8,8)	Tango	"Czułe miejsce"—Baranovski	Safe
Magdalena & Rafał	36 (9,9,9,9)	Cha-cha-cha	"Love Again"—Dua Lipa	Safe
Kinga & Jakub	32 (9,8,7,8)	Contemporary	"I Ciebie też, bardzo"—Męskie Granie Orkiestra	Safe
Izabela & Stefano	26 (8,3,6,9)	Tango	"Believer"—Imagine Dragons	Eliminated
Oliwia & Michał	31 (9,7,7,8)	Rumba	"Too Good at Goodbyes"—Sam Smith	Safe
Łukasz & Wiktoria	25 (9,6,3,7)	Samba	"Bailando"—Enrique Iglesias	Safe
Magdalena & Rafał; Sylwia & Jacek; Oliwia & Michał	34 (10,9,7,8)	Salsa	"La Pantera Mambo"—Orquesta La 33	
Łukasz & Wiktoria; Izabela & Stefano; Piotr & Hanna; Kinga & Jakub	40 (10,10,10,10)	Charleston	"Sing, Sing, Sing (With a Swing)"—Louis Prima	

=== Week 5: Trio Challenge ===
Running order

Couple	Score	Dance	Music	Result
Oliwia & Michał (Szymon Bieniuk)	27 (9,5,6,7)	Jive	"Blinding Lights"—The Weeknd	Safe
Łukasz & Wiktoria (Paulina Powierza)	31 (9,7,7,8)	Tango	"I Wanna Be Your Slave"—Måneskin	Safe
Magdalena & Rafał (Leokadia Kajrowicz)	35 (10,8,8,9)	Charleston	"Być kobietą"—Alicja Majewska	Safe
Piotr & Hanna (Agnieszka Wasilewska)	40 (10,10,10,10)	Rumba	"Shape of My Heart"—Sting	Safe
Sylwia & Jacek (Agnieszka Antoniak)	29 (9,4,8,8)	Quickstep	"Ain't Your Mama"—Jennifer Lopez	Safe
Kinga & Jakub (Kacper Sawczuk)	31 (10,6,7,8)	Foxtrot	"Girls Like You"—Maroon 5 feat. Cardi B	Eliminated

Dance-offs
Couple	Dance	Music	Result
Magdalena & Rafał	Cha-cha-cha	"Ale jazz!"—Sanah & Vito Bambino	Winner (3 pts)
Oliwia & Michał	Cha-cha-cha	"Ale jazz!"—Sanah & Vito Bambino	Loser
Piotr & Hanna	Tango	"Don't Stop The Music"—Rihanna	Loser
Sylwia & Jacek	Tango	"Don't Stop The Music"—Rihanna	Winner (3 pts)
Łukasz & Wiktoria	Samba	"Ramię w ramię"—Kayah & Viki Gabor	Winner (3 pts)
Kinga & Jakub	Samba	"Ramię w ramię"—Kayah & Viki Gabor	Loser

=== Week 6: ABBA Week ===
Running order

Couple	Score	Dance	Music	Result
Magdalena & Rafał	34 (9,8,7,10)	Tango	"Voulez-Vous"—ABBA	Bottom two
Magdalena & Rafał	40 (10,10,10,10)	Rumba	"Set Fire to the Rain"—Adele	Bottom two
Oliwia & Michał	23 (8,3,5,7)	Swing	"Honey, Honey"—ABBA	Safe
Oliwia & Michał	25 (9,4,5,7)	Quickstep	"Sorry"—Justin Bieber	Safe
Piotr & Hanna	36 (9,9,9,9)	Paso Doble	"Gimme! Gimme! Gimme! (A Man After Midnight)"—ABBA	Safe
Piotr & Hanna	40 (10,10,10,10)	Waltz	"Hero"—Mariah Carey	Safe
Łukasz & Wiktoria	25 (9,5,4,7)	Cha-cha-cha	"Mamma Mia"—ABBA	Eliminated
Łukasz & Wiktoria	33 (9,8,7,9)	Quickstep	"Forgive Me Friend"—Smith & Thell	Eliminated
Sylwia & Jacek	25 (8,5,5,7)	Samba	"Dancing Queen"—ABBA	Safe
Sylwia & Jacek	36 (9,8,9,10)	Foxtrot	"Just the Way You Are"—Bruno Mars	Safe

=== Week 7: Around the World ===
Running order

Couple	Score	Dance	Music	Result
Sylwia & Jacek	26 (7,5,6,8)	Hip-hop	"Gettin' Jiggy wit It"—Will Smith	Eliminated
Sylwia & Jacek	30 (8,7,7,8)	Quickstep	"Flying"—Nice Little Penguins	Eliminated
Magdalena & Rafał	40 (10,10,10,10)	Salsa	"La Vida Es Un Carnaval"—Celia Cruz	Safe
Magdalena & Rafał	38 (10,9,9,10)	Waltz	"Always Remember Us This Way"—Lady Gaga	Safe
Piotr & Hanna	34 (9,8,8,9)	Disco	"Gangnam Style"—PSY	Safe
Piotr & Hanna	39 (9,10,10,10)	Jive	"Dance with Me Tonight"—Olly Murs	Safe
Oliwia & Michał	29 (8,6,7,8)	Bollywood	"Jai Ho! (You Are My Destiny)"—The Pussycat Dolls	Bottom two
Oliwia & Michał	28 (8,6,7,7)	Rumba	"Beneath Your Beautiful"—Labrinth featuring Emeli Sandé	Bottom two

=== Week 8: Trio Challenge (Semi-final) ===
Running order

Couple	Score	Dance	Music	Result
Oliwia & Michał (Edyta Zając)	28 (8,6,7,7)	Salsa	"Tico Tico"—Edmundo Ros	Bottom two
Oliwia & Michał (Edyta Zając)	32 (9,8,7,8)	Swing	"My Baby Just Cares for Me"—Nina Simone	Bottom two
Piotr & Hanna (Mariusz Węgłowski)	33 (9,8,8,8)	Foxtrot	"I Wanna Be Loved by You"—Marilyn Monroe	Safe
Piotr & Hanna (Mariusz Węgłowski)	40 (10,10,10,10)	Tango	"Enjoy the Silence"—Depeche Mode	Safe
Magdalena & Rafał (Marcin Korcz)	39 (10,10,9,10)	Paso Doble	"Malagueña"—Ernesto Lecuona	Bottom two
Magdalena & Rafał (Marcin Korcz)	40 (10,10,10,10)	Quickstep	"I'm So Excited"—The Pointer Sisters	Bottom two

Dance-off

Running order

Couple	Score	Dance	Music	Result
Oliwia & Michał	32 (9,7,8,8)	Cha-cha-cha	"Szampan"—Sanah	Third place
Magdalena & Rafał	40 (10,10,10,10)	Rumba	"Nie żałuję"—Edyta Geppert	Safe

=== Week 9: Season Final ===
Running order

Couple	Score	Dance	Music	Result
Magdalena & Rafał	37 (10,9,8,10)	Jive	"Słodkiego, miłego życia"—Kombi	Runners-up
Magdalena & Rafał	39 (10,10,9,10)	Tango	"Voulez-Vous"—ABBA	Runners-up
Magdalena & Rafał	40 (10,10,10,10)	Freestyle	"Wracam do domu"—Justyna Steczkowska	Runners-up
Piotr & Hanna	37 (10,9,8,10)	Contemporary	"Przytul mnie"—Kombi	Winners
Piotr & Hanna	39 (10,10,9,10)	Cha-cha-cha	"Pod wiatr"—Grzegorz Hyży	Winners
Piotr & Hanna	40 (10,10,10,10)	Freestyle	"Czarna polana"—Kayah feat. Atanas Valkov "Prócz ciebie, nic"—Kayah & Krzysztof Kiljański	Winners

Other Dances

Couple	Dance	Music
Oliwia & Michał	Viennese Waltz	"Lubię wracać tam, gdzie byłem"—Zbigniew Wodecki
Sylwia & Jacek	Viennese Waltz	"Lubię wracać tam, gdzie byłem"—Zbigniew Wodecki
Łukasz & Wiktoria	Viennese Waltz	"Lubię wracać tam, gdzie byłem"—Zbigniew Wodecki
Kinga & Jakub	Viennese Waltz	"Lubię wracać tam, gdzie byłem"—Zbigniew Wodecki
Izabela & Stefano	Viennese Waltz	"Lubię wracać tam, gdzie byłem"—Zbigniew Wodecki
Radosław & Lenka	Viennese Waltz	"Lubię wracać tam, gdzie byłem"—Zbigniew Wodecki
Wojciech & Paulina	Viennese Waltz	"Lubię wracać tam, gdzie byłem"—Zbigniew Wodecki
Denis & Janja	Viennese Waltz	"Lubię wracać tam, gdzie byłem"—Zbigniew Wodecki

== Dance chart ==
The celebrities and professional partners danced one of these routines for each corresponding week:

- Week 1 (Season Premiere): Quickstep, Waltz, Jive, Cha-cha-cha, Tango, Samba, Viennese Waltz
- Week 2 (Love Night): One unlearned dance (introducing Rumba)
- Week 3 (Hometown Glory): One unlearned dance (introducing Foxtrot) and Mambo Marathon
- Week 4 (You Decide!): One unlearned dance (introducing Contemporary) and Team Dance (Salsa and Charleston)
- Week 5 (Trio Challenge): One unlearned dance (introducing Charleston) and dance-offs
- Week 6 (ABBA Week): One unlearned dance (introducing Swing, Paso Doble) and one repeated dance
- Week 7 (Around the World): One unlearned uncommon dance (Hip-hop, Salsa, Disco, Bollywood) and one repeated dance
- Week 8 (Semi-final: Trio Challenge): One unlearned dance, one repeated dance (Judges' choice) and dance-offs
- Week 9 (Season Final): One unlearned dance, one repeated dance (rivals' choice) and Freestyle

Couple	1	2	3		4		5		6		7		8			9		
Piotr & Hanna	Jive	Waltz	Cha-cha-cha	Mambo (Marathon)	Tango	Charleston (Team Dance)	Rumba	Tango	Paso Doble	Waltz	Disco	Jive	Foxtrot	Tango	- (Immunity)	Contemporary	Cha-cha-cha	Freestyle
Magdalena & Rafał	Quickstep	Waltz	Rumba	Mambo (Marathon)	Cha-cha-cha	Salsa (Team Dance)	Charleston	Cha-cha-cha	Tango	Rumba	Salsa	Waltz	Paso Doble	Quickstep	Rumba	Jive	Tango	Freestyle
Oliwia & Michał	Cha-cha-cha	Quickstep	Viennese Waltz	Mambo (Marathon)	Rumba	Salsa (Team Dance)	Jive	Cha-cha-cha	Swing	Quickstep	Bollywood	Rumba	Salsa	Swing	Cha-cha-cha			Viennese Waltz
Sylwia & Jacek	Tango	Jive	Foxtrot	Mambo (Marathon)	Cha-cha-cha	Salsa (Team Dance)	Quickstep	Tango	Samba	Foxtrot	Hip-hop	Quickstep						Viennese Waltz
Łukasz & Wiktoria	Quickstep	Rumba	Viennese Waltz	Mambo (Marathon)	Samba	Charleston (Team Dance)	Tango	Samba	Cha-cha-cha	Quickstep								Viennese Waltz
Kinga & Jakub	Samba	Viennese Waltz	Cha-cha-cha	Mambo (Marathon)	Contemporary	Charleston (Team Dance)	Foxtrot	Samba										Viennese Waltz
Izabela & Stefano	Waltz	Rumba	Samba	Mambo (Marathon)	Tango	Charleston (Team Dance)												Viennese Waltz
Radosław & Lenka	Cha-cha-cha	Samba	Quickstep	Mambo (Marathon)														Viennese Waltz
Wojciech & Paulina	Cha-cha-cha	Viennese Waltz																Viennese Waltz
Denis & Janja	Viennese Waltz																	Viennese Waltz

Highest scoring dance
Lowest scoring dance
Performed, but not scored
Bonus points
Not performed due to withdrawal
Gained bonus points for winning this dance-off
Gained no bonus points for losing this dance-off

== Guest performances ==
Date	Artist(s)	Song(s)	Dancers
6 September	Sławomir Zapała	"Oczarowanie"	Magdalena Kajrowicz-Zapała & Rafał Maserak
20 September	Andrzej Piaseczny	"Miłość"	NEXT Dance Group
27 September	Dawid Kwiatkowski	"Bez ciebie" "Proste"	NEXT Dance Group
4 October	Roksana Węgiel	"Korona"	NEXT Dance Group
11 October	Cleo	"Dom" "Kocham"	NEXT Dance Group
11 October	Magda Bereda	"Always Remember Us This Way"	Magdalena Kajrowicz-Zapała & Rafał Maserak
18 October	Ewa Farna	"Znak"	NEXT Dance Group
25 October	Kombi	"Słodkiego, miłego życia"	Magdalena Kajrowicz-Zapała & Rafał Maserak
25 October	Kombi	"Przytul mnie"	Piotr Mróz & Hanna Żudziewicz
25 October	Doda	"Don't Wanna Hide"	—
25 October	Alicja Majewska	"Odkryjemy miłość nieznaną"	Michał Bartkiewicz & Wiktoria Omyła
25 October	Alicja Majewska & Andrzej Piaseczny	"Lubię wracać tam, gdzie byłem"	All participating couples
