= Taniec z gwiazdami season 1 =

Taniec z gwiazdami
- Season 1
- Hosted by: Hubert Urbański; Magda Mołek
- Judges: Iwona Pavlović; Piotr Galiński; Beata Tyszkiewicz; Zbigniew Wodecki
- Celebrity winner: Olivier Janiak
- Professional winner: Kamila Kajak
- No. of episodes: 8

Release
- Original network: TVN
- Original release: 16 April – 4 June 2005

Season chronology
- Next → Season 2

The 1st season of Taniec z gwiazdami, the Polish edition of Dancing with the Stars, started on 16 April 2005 and ended on 4 June 2005. It was broadcast by TVN. Magda Mołek and Hubert Urbański were the hosts, and the judges were: Iwona Szymańska-Pavlović, Zbigniew Wodecki, Beata Tyszkiewicz and Piotr Galiński.

On 4 June, Olivier Janiak and his partner Kamila Kajak were crowned the champions.

== Couples ==
| Celebrity | Notability | Professional partner | Status |
|---|---|---|---|
| Robert Kudelski | Na Wspólnej actor | Agnieszka Pomorska | Eliminated 1st on 23 April 2005 |
| Agnieszka Włodarczyk | Film and television actress | Michał Skawiński | Eliminated 2nd on 30 April 2005 |
| Klaudia Carlos | Sports presenter | Rafał Maserak | Eliminated 3rd on 7 May 2005 |
| Anna Korcz | Na Wspólnej actress | Robert Kochanek | Eliminated 4th on 14 May 2005 |
| Katarzyna Skrzynecka | Actress and singer | Marcin Hakiel | Eliminated 5th on 21 May 2005 |
| Andrzej Nejman | Złotopolscy actor | Magdalena Soszyńska | Third place on 28 May 2005 |
| Witold Paszt | Vox singer | Anna Głogowska | Runners-up on 4 June 2005 |
| Olivier Janiak | TVN presenter | Kamila Kajak | Winners on 4 June 2005 |

== Scores ==
| Couple | Place | 1 | 2 | 1+2 | 3 | 4 | 5 | 6 | 7 | 8 |
|---|---|---|---|---|---|---|---|---|---|---|
| Olivier & Kamila | 1 | 35 | 33 | 68 | 32‡ | 37 | 35 | 39+36=75† | 29+33=62‡ | 35+40+40=115 |
| Witold & Anna | 2 | 27 | 36† | 63 | 33 | 24‡ | 36 | 32+34=66‡ | 33+39=72† | 38+37+40=115 |
| Andrzej & Magdalena | 3 | 29 | 32 | 61 | 34 | 34 | 28‡ | 36+36=72 | 32+36=68 | |
| Katarzyna & Marcin | 4 | 25 | 35 | 60 | 34 | 40† | 39† | 31+36=67 | | |
| Anna & Robert | 5 | 18‡ | 30 | 48‡ | 34 | 24‡ | 33 | | | |
| Klaudia & Rafał | 6 | 36† | 34 | 70† | 36† | 29 | | | | |
| Agnieszka & Michał | 7 | 26 | 34 | 60 | 33 | | | | | |
| Robert & Agnieszka | 8 | 23 | 26‡ | 49 | | | | | | |

Red numbers indicate the lowest score for each week.
Green numbers indicate the highest score for each week.
indicates the couple eliminated that week.
indicates the returning couple that finished in the bottom two.
indicates the winning couple of the week.
indicates the runner-up of the week.

Notes:
Week 1: Klaudia Carlos scored 36 out of 40 for their first dances and it was the highest score in Week 1. Anna Korcz got 18 points for her Waltz, making it the lowest score of the week and this season. There was no elimination this week.

Week 2: Witold Paszt got 36 points for the Quickstep and it was the highest score in Week 2. Anna Korcz made the biggest weekly improvement in 1st season, after scoring 12 points more than in Week 1. Robert Kudelski got 26 points for his Rumba, making it the lowest score of the week. Robert & Agnieszka were eliminated.

Week 3: Klaudia Carlos was on top of the leaderboard, having 36 points for her Jive. Olivier Janiak got 32 points for his Tango, making it the lowest score of the week. Agnieszka & Michał were eliminated.

Week 4: Katarzyna Skrzynecka got the first perfect score in the history of the show for her Paso Doble. Witold Paszt and Anna Korcz got 24 points for their dances, making it the lowest score of the week. Klaudia & Rafał were eliminated.

Week 5: Katarzyna Skrzynecka scored 39 points for her Samba and was on the top of the leaderboard. Witold Paszt made another biggest weekly improvement in 1st season, after scoring 12 points more than in Week 4. Andrzej Nejman got 28 points for his Samba, making it the lowest score of the week. Apart from competition all the couples danced group Viennese Waltz. Anna & Robert were eliminated.

Week 6: All the couples danced two dances. Olivier Janiak was on the top of the leaderboard, getting 39 out of 40 points for his Quickstep and 36 out of 40 for his Cha-Cha-Cha. Katarzyna & Marcin were eliminated.

Week 7: All the couples danced two new dances. Witold Paszt got 39 out of 40 points for his Paso Doble and it was the highest score in Week 7. Andrzej & Magdalena were eliminated.

Week 8: Both couples performed three dances: their favorite Latin dance, their favorite Ballroom dance and a Freestyle. Both couples got their first perfect scores: Olivier & Kamila for Foxtrot and Freestyle, Witold & Anna for Freestyle. Olivier Janiak became the first winner in the history of the show.

== Average chart ==
| Rank by average | Place | Team | Average | Total | Best Score | Worst Score |
|---|---|---|---|---|---|---|
| 1. | 1. | Olivier Janiak & Kamila Kajak | 35.3 | 424 | 40 | 29 |
| 2. | 4. | Katarzyna Skrzynecka & Marcin Hakiel | 34.3 | 240 | 40 | 25 |
| 3. | 2. | Witold Paszt & Anna Głogowska | 34.1 | 409 | 40 | 24 |
| 4. | 6. | Klaudia Carlos & Rafał Maserak | 33.8 | 135 | 36 | 29 |
| 5. | 3. | Andrzej Nejman & Magdalena Soszyńska | 33.0 | 297 | 36 | 28 |
| 6. | 7. | Agnieszka Włodarczyk & Michał Skawiński | 31.0 | 93 | 34 | 26 |
| 7. | 5. | Anna Korcz & Robert Kochanek | 27.8 | 139 | 34 | 18 |
| 8. | 8. | Robert Kudelski & Agnieszka Pomorska | 24.5 | 49 | 26 | 23 |
| All couples | | | 31.73 | 1786 | | |

== Episodes ==
=== Week 1 ===
Individual judges scores in charts below (given in parentheses) are listed in this order from left to right: Piotr Galiński, Beata Tyszkiewicz, Zbigniew Wodecki, Iwona Pavlović.

Running order

| Couple | Score | Style | Music |
|---|---|---|---|
| Katarzyna & Marcin | 25 (6,7,7,5) | Cha-Cha-Cha | "Let's Get Loud" — Jennifer Lopez |
| Robert & Agnieszka | 23 (5,7,7,4) | Waltz | "I Wonder Why" — Curtis Stigers |
| Witold & Anna | 27 (6,9,7,5) | Cha-Cha-Cha | "Sex Bomb" — Tom Jones |
| Agnieszka & Michał | 26 (5,8,7,6) | Waltz | "Come Away With Me" — Norah Jones |
| Klaudia & Rafał | 36 (9,9,9,9) | Cha-Cha-Cha | "Lady Marmalade" — Christina Aguilera, Lil' Kim, Mýa, Pink |
| Anna & Robert | 18 (3,6,6,3) | Waltz | "You Light Up My Life" — Debby Boone |
| Andrzej & Magdalena | 29 (6,8,8,7) | Cha-Cha-Cha | "She Bangs" — Ricky Martin |
| Olivier & Kamila | 35 (9,9,9,8) | Waltz | "If You Don't Know Me by Now" — Simply Red |

=== Week 2 ===
Individual judges scores in charts below (given in parentheses) are listed in this order from left to right: Piotr Galiński, Beata Tyszkiewicz, Iwona Pavlović, Zbigniew Wodecki.

Running order

| Couple | Score | Style | Music | Results |
|---|---|---|---|---|
| Olivier & Kamila | 33 (8,9,8,8) | Rumba | "Bésame Mucho" — Jimmy Dorsey and His Orchestra | Safe |
| Andrzej & Magdalena | 32 (8,8,8,8) | Quickstep | "Sing, Sing, Sing" — Louis Prima | Safe |
| Robert & Agnieszka | 26 (6,8,5,7) | Rumba | "Out of Reach" — Gabrielle | Eliminated |
| Klaudia & Rafał | 34 (8,9,8,9) | Quickstep | "Sparkling Diamonds" — Nicole Kidman | Safe |
| Agnieszka & Michał | 34 (8,9,8,9) | Rumba | "I Just Can't Stop Loving You" — Michael Jackson | Safe |
| Katarzyna & Marcin | 35 (9,10,7,9) | Quickstep | "Mack the Knife" — Bobby Darin | Safe |
| Anna & Robert | 30 (7,8,7,8) | Rumba | "Careless Whisper" — Wham! | Bottom two |
| Witold & Anna | 36 (10,10,7,9) | Quickstep | "You're the One That I Want" — John Travolta & Olivia Newton-John | Safe |

=== Week 3 ===
Individual judges scores in charts below (given in parentheses) are listed in this order from left to right: Piotr Galiński, Beata Tyszkiewicz, Iwona Pavlović, Zbigniew Wodecki.

Running order

| Couple | Score | Style | Music | Results |
|---|---|---|---|---|
| Witold & Anna | 33 (8,9,7,9) | Jive | "Hit the Road Jack" — Ray Charles | Safe |
| Olivier & Kamila | 32 (7,8,8,9) | Tango | "Toxic" — Britney Spears | Bottom two |
| Andrzej & Magdalena | 34 (8,9,8,9) | Jive | "I'm Still Standing" — Elton John | Safe |
| Anna & Robert | 34 (9,9,8,8) | Tango | "El Tango de Roxanne" — from Moulin Rouge! | Safe |
| Klaudia & Rafał | 36 (9,9,9,9) | Jive | "Mambo No. 5" — Lou Bega | Safe |
| Agnieszka & Michał | 33 (8,9,7,9) | Tango | "Tanguera" — Sexteto Major | Eliminated |
| Katarzyna & Marcin | 34 (8,9,8,9) | Jive | "Wake Me Up Before You Go-Go" — Wham! | Safe |

=== Week 4 ===
Individual judges scores in charts below (given in parentheses) are listed in this order from left to right: Iwona Pavlović, Zbigniew Wodecki, Beata Tyszkiewicz, Piotr Galiński.

Running order

| Couple | Score | Style | Music | Results |
|---|---|---|---|---|
| Anna & Robert | 24 (5,7,7,5) | Paso Doble | "España cañí" — Pascual Marquina Narro | Bottom two |
| Witold & Anna | 24 (4,10,6,4) | Foxtrot | "Fever" — Peggy Lee | Safe |
| Klaudia & Rafał | 29 (6,9,8,6) | Foxtrot | "New York, New York" — Frank Sinatra | Eliminated |
| Olivier & Kamila | 37 (8,10,10,9) | Foxtrot | "Have You Met Miss Jones?" — Robbie Williams | Safe |
| Katarzyna & Marcin | 40 (10,10,10,10) | Paso Doble | "Malagueña" — Ernesto Lecuona | Safe |
| Andrzej & Magdalena | 34 (9,9,9,7) | Foxtrot | "Big Spender" — Shirley Bassey | Safe |

=== Week 5 ===
Individual judges scores in charts below (given in parentheses) are listed in this order from left to right: Iwona Pavlović, Zbigniew Wodecki, Beata Tyszkiewicz, Piotr Galiński.

Running order

| Couple | Score | Style | Music | Results |
|---|---|---|---|---|
| Andrzej & Magdalena | 28 (7,8,8,5) | Samba | "Love Is in the Air" — John Paul Young | Safe |
| Anna & Robert | 33 (7,8,9,9) | Samba | "Volare" — Gipsy Kings | Eliminated |
| Olivier & Kamila | 35 (8,9,10,8) | Samba | "Soul Bossa Nova" — Quincy Jones | Bottom two |
| Witold & Anna | 36 (8,9,10,9) | Samba | "Livin' la Vida Loca" — Ricky Martin | Safe |
| Katarzyna & Marcin | 39 (9,10,10,10) | Samba | "Bailamos" — Enrique Iglesias | Safe |
| Katarzyna & Marcin; Witold & Anna; Anna & Robert; Andrzej & Magdalena; Olivier & Kamila | N/A | Group Viennese Waltz | "I Have Nothing" — Whitney Houston | |

=== Week 6 ===
Individual judges scores in charts below (given in parentheses) are listed in this order from left to right: Iwona Pavlović, Zbigniew Wodecki, Beata Tyszkiewicz, Piotr Galiński.

Running order

| Couple | Score | Style | Music | Results |
|---|---|---|---|---|
| Katarzyna & Marcin | 31 (6,8,9,8) | Rumba | "Hero" — Enrique Iglesias | Eliminated |
| Katarzyna & Marcin | 36 (9,9,9,9) | Foxtrot | "Dream a Little Dream of Me" — Doris Day | Eliminated |
| Witold & Anna | 32 (7,9,8,8) | Waltz | "Three Times a Lady" — The Commodores | Bottom two |
| Witold & Anna | 34 (8,9,8,9) | Rumba | "How Deep Is Your Love" — Bee Gees | Bottom two |
| Andrzej & Magdalena | 36 (9,9,9,9) | Paso Doble | "Ole España" - traditional music | Safe |
| Andrzej & Magdalena | 36 (9,9,9,9) | Tango | "Jealousy" — Jacob Gade | Safe |
| Olivier & Kamila | 39 (10,10,10,9) | Quickstep | "Billy-A-Dick" — Bette Midler | Safe |
| Olivier & Kamila | 36 (8,9,10,9) | Cha-Cha-Cha | "Smooth" — Carlos Santana & Rob Thomas | Safe |

=== Week 7 ===
Individual judges scores in charts below (given in parentheses) are listed in this order from left to right: Iwona Pavlović, Zbigniew Wodecki, Beata Tyszkiewicz, Piotr Galiński.

Running order

| Couple | Score | Style | Music | Results |
|---|---|---|---|---|
| Andrzej & Magdalena | 32 (8,8,9,7) | Rumba | "Endless Love" — Diana Ross & Lionel Richie | Eliminated |
| Andrzej & Magdalena | 36 (9,9,9,9) | Waltz | "What a Wonderful World" — Louis Armstrong | Eliminated |
| Witold & Anna | 33 (6,9,9,9) | Tango | "My Heart Belongs to Daddy" — Marilyn Monroe | Safe |
| Witold & Anna | 39 (9,10,10,10) | Paso Doble | "El Conquistador" — José Esparza | Safe |
| Olivier & Kamila | 29 (6,8,9,6) | Paso Doble | "Cancion del Mariachi" — Antonio Banderas | Bottom two |
| Olivier & Kamila | 33 (6,9,10,8) | Jive | "You Can't Hurry Love" — Phil Collins | Bottom two |

=== Week 8: Final ===
Individual judges scores in charts below (given in parentheses) are listed in this order from left to right: Iwona Pavlović, Zbigniew Wodecki, Beata Tyszkiewicz, Piotr Galiński.

Running order

| Couple | Score | Style | Music | Results |
|---|---|---|---|---|
| Witold & Anna | 38 (9,10,10,9) | Paso Doble | "El Conquistador" — Jose Esparza | Runners-up |
| Witold & Anna | 37 (7,10,10,10) | Quickstep | "You're the One That I Want" — John Travolta & Olivia Newton-John | Runners-up |
| Witold & Anna | 40 (10,10,10,10) | Freestyle | "Money, Money" — from Cabaret | Runners-up |
| Olivier & Kamila | 35 (8,9,10,8) | Cha-Cha-Cha | "Smooth" — Carlos Santana & Rob Thomas | Winners |
| Olivier & Kamila | 40 (10,10,10,10) | Foxtrot | "Have You Met Miss Jones?" — Robbie Williams | Winners |
| Olivier & Kamila | 40 (10,10,10,10) | Freestyle | Theme song from Polskie drogi | Winners |

Non-scored dances

| Couple | Style | Music |
|---|---|---|
| Robert & Agnieszka | Waltz | "I Wonder Why" — Curtis Stigers |
| Agnieszka & Michał | Tango | "Tanguera" — Sexteto Major |
| Klaudia & Rafał | Jive | "Mambo No. 5" — Lou Bega |
| Anna & Robert | Paso Doble | "España cañí" — Pascual Marquina Narro |
| Katarzyna & Marcin | Samba | "Moliendo Cafe" |
| Andrzej & Magdalena | Jive | "I'm Still Standing" — Elton John |

== Dance schedule ==
The celebrities and professional partners danced one of these routines for each corresponding week.

- Week 1: Cha-Cha-Cha or Waltz
- Week 2: Rumba or Quickstep
- Week 3: Jive or Tango
- Week 4: Paso Doble or Foxtrot
- Week 5: Samba & Group Viennese Waltz
- Week 6: Two unlearned dances
- Week 7: Two unlearned dances
- Week 8: Favorite Latin dance, favorite Ballroom dance & Freestyle

== Dance chart ==
| Team | Week 1 | Week 2 | Week 3 | Week 4 | Week 5 | | Week 6 | | Week 7 | | Week 8 Final | | |
|---|---|---|---|---|---|---|---|---|---|---|---|---|---|
| Olivier & Kamila | Waltz | Rumba | Tango | Foxtrot | Samba | Group Viennese Waltz | Quickstep | Cha-Cha-Cha | Paso Doble | Jive | Cha-Cha-Cha | Foxtrot | Freestyle |
| Witold & Anna | Cha-Cha-Cha | Quickstep | Jive | Foxtrot | Samba | Group Viennese Waltz | Waltz | Rumba | Tango | Paso Doble | Paso Doble | Quickstep | Freestyle |
| Andrzej & Magdalena | Cha-Cha-Cha | Quickstep | Jive | Foxtrot | Samba | Group Viennese Waltz | Paso Doble | Tango | Rumba | Waltz | | | |
| Katarzyna & Marcin | Cha-Cha-Cha | Quickstep | Jive | Paso Doble | Samba | Group Viennese Waltz | Rumba | Foxtrot | | | | | |
| Anna & Robert | Waltz | Rumba | Tango | Paso Doble | Samba | Group Viennese Waltz | | | | | | | |
| Klaudia & Rafał | Cha-Cha-Cha | Quickstep | Jive | Foxtrot | | | | | | | | | |
| Agnieszka & Michał | Waltz | Rumba | Tango | | | | | | | | | | |
| Robert & Agnieszka | Waltz | Rumba | | | | | | | | | | | |

Highest scoring dance
Lowest scoring dance
Performed, but not scored

== Weekly results ==
The order is based on the judges' scores combined with the viewers' votes.

| Order | Week 2 | Week 3 | Week 4 | Week 5 | Week 6 | Week 7 | Week 8 Final |
|---|---|---|---|---|---|---|---|
| 1 | Klaudia & Rafał | Andrzej & Magdalena | Katarzyna & Marcin | Katarzyna & Marcin | Olivier & Kamila | Witold & Anna | Olivier & Kamila |
| 2 | Olivier & Kamila | Klaudia & Rafał | Olivier & Kamila | Witold & Anna | Andrzej & Magdalena | Olivier & Kamila | Witold & Anna |
| 3 | Katarzyna & Marcin | Katarzyna & Marcin | Witold & Anna | Andrzej & Magdalena | Witold & Anna | Andrzej & Magdalena | |
| 4 | Witold & Anna | Anna & Robert | Andrzej & Magdalena | Olivier & Kamila | Katarzyna & Marcin | | |
| 5 | Andrzej & Magdalena | Witold & Anna | Anna & Robert | Anna & Robert | | | |
| 6 | Agnieszka & Michał | Olivier & Kamila | Klaudia & Rafał | | | | |
| 7 | Anna & Robert | Agnieszka & Michał | | | | | |
| 8 | Robert & Agnieszka | | | | | | |

This couple came in first place with the judges.
This couple came in first place with the judges and gained the highest number of viewers' votes.
This couple gained the highest number of viewers' votes.
This couple came in last place with the judges and gained the highest number of viewers' votes.
This couple came in last place with the judges.
This couple came in last place with the judges and was eliminated.
This couple was eliminated.
This couple won the competition.
This couple came in second in the competition.
This couple came in third in the competition.

=== Audience voting results ===
The percentage of votes cast by a couple in a particular week is given in parentheses.

| Order | Week 2 | Week 3 | Week 4 | Week 5 | Week 6 | Week 7 | Week 8 Final |
|---|---|---|---|---|---|---|---|
| 1 | Olivier & Kamila | Andrzej & Magdalena | Katarzyna & Marcin | Katarzyna & Marcin | Olivier & Kamila | Olivier & Kamila | Olivier & Kamila |
| 2 | Klaudia & Rafał | Klaudia & Rafał | Witold & Anna | Andrzej & Magdalena | Andrzej & Magdalena | Witold & Anna | Witold & Anna |
| 3 | Andrzej & Magdalena | Katarzyna & Marcin | Olivier & Kamila | Witold & Anna | Witold & Anna | Andrzej & Magdalena | |
| 4 | Katarzyna & Marcin | Witold & Anna | Andrzej & Magdalena | Olivier & Kamila | Katarzyna & Marcin | | |
| 5 | Witold & Anna | Olivier & Kamila | Anna & Robert | Anna & Robert | | | |
| 6 | Anna & Robert | Anna & Robert | Klaudia & Rafał | | | | |
| 7 | Robert & Agnieszka | Agnieszka & Michał | | | | | |
| 8 | Agnieszka & Michał | | | | | | |

== Rating figures ==
| Episode | Date | Official rating 4+ | Share 4+ | Share 16-39 | Cite |
|---|---|---|---|---|---|
| 1 | 16 April 2005 | 2 889 087 | 19,87% | 20,66% | |
| 2 | 23 April 2005 | 3 631 027 | 24,61% | 24,60% | |
| 3 | 30 April 2005 | 3 341 743 | 24,29% | 23,09% | |
| 4 | 7 May 2005 | 3 360 527 | 21,81% | 21,24% | |
| 5 | 14 May 2005 | 3 391 588 | 23,89% | 22,49% | |
| 6 | 21 May 2005 | 3 425 985 | 25,64% | 23,71% | |
| 7 | 28 May 2005 | 2 901 281 | 23,08% | 23,71% | |
| 8 | 4 June 2005 | 3 879 102 | 28,37% | 26,32% | |
| Average | - | 3 375 275 | 24,06% | 23,32% | |
