= Sandra Kubicka =

Polish model and TV presenter (born 1995)

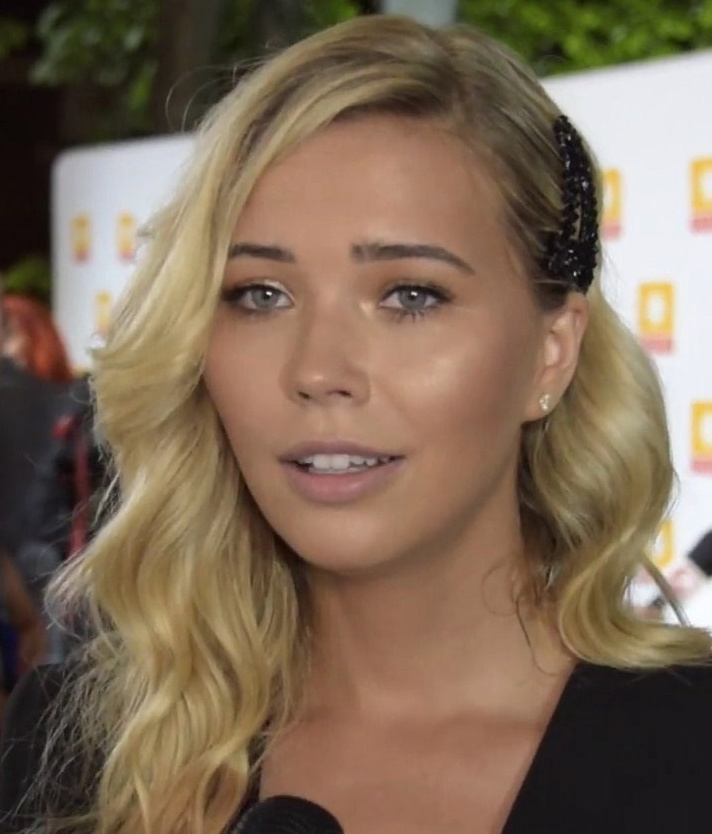
- Kubicka in 2019
- Born: 22 January 1995 (age 31); Łódź, Poland
- Citizenship: Poland
- Occupation: Fashion model
- Years active: 2009-present
- Spouse: Aleksander Milwiw-Baron (m. 2024; div. 2025)
- Children: 1
- Website: sandrakubicka.com

Sandra Kubicka
- Modelling information
- Height: 174 cm (5 ft 9 in)
- Hair colour: Light brown
- Eye colour: Hazel
- Agency: Next Model Management, Avant Models

Sandra Kubicka (Polish pronunciation: [ˈsandra kuˈbit͡ska], born 22 January 1995 in Łódź) is a Polish celebrity and TV presenter, and a former photo model. She resides in both Miami and Warsaw.

== Early life and career ==
Born in Łódź, she grew up without a father, with whom she had no contact. When she was six, her mother emigrated to the United States to work, during which time Sandra was raised by her grandparents. At the age of 12, she joined her mother and moved to Miami.

=== Modeling career ===
At the age of 13, she entered a local modeling competition, after which she was spotted by a recruiter from the Next Model Management agency and began her modeling career. As a teenager, she participated in photoshoots for youth brands. After reaching adulthood, she participated in numerous commercial projects and advertising campaigns. She took part in photo shoots for the American edition of Playboy magazine, Treats! magazine and the Polish edition of Glamour. The Maxim magazine included her in the list of "100 Sexiest Names in America".

After fourteen years in this career, she retired from modeling.

=== Television career ===
In 2019, she took third place in the 10th season of Polsat's version of the TV show Dancing with the Stars, a version of Britain's Strictly Come Dancing. In 2023, she hosted the TVP dating program Love Me or Leave Me. Kochaj albo rzuć, and the music program Rytmy Dwójki (Rhythms of Two).

== Personal life ==
She was engaged to DJ Cedric Gervais and entrepreneur Kaio Alves Gonçalves. In 2021, she began a relationship with musician Aleksander Milwiw-Baron, a member of the band Afromental, whom she married on 6 April 2024. Kubicka had a son with Milwiw-Baron, who was born on 16 May 2024. On 9 March 2025, she announced her separation from Milwiw-Baron. However, a few months later, she confirmed the withdrawal of the divorce papers. In December 2025, media reports circulated that she had filed for another divorce.

She suffers from polyendocrine metabolic ovarian syndrome (PMOS). At the age of 19, she underwent breast augmentation surgery.
