= Hindi dance music =

Music genre

Hindi dance music encompasses a wide range of songs predominantly featured in the Hindi cinema with a growing worldwide attraction. The music became popular among overseas Indians in places such as South Africa, Mauritius, Fiji, the Caribbean, Canada, the United Kingdom, the Netherlands and the United States of America and eventually developed a global fan base.

== Recognition ==
While Hindi dance music forms part of the music of Hindi cinema, the wide-based genre songs became popular by the early-to-mid-2000s after the worldwide success of the Punjabi song "Mundian To Bach Ke" which charted in various international music charts, and other famous dance songs such as "Kajra Re". By the late 2000s, Hindi dance music attained worldwide recognition following the success of the Oscar-winning song "Jai Ho". By the 2010s, due to the growing fan base of EDM, Hindi dance music began incorporating EDM, prompting the recognition of songs such as "Baby Doll". The style of music was also an influence for British singer M.I.A. and her album Matangi. Not to mention; Hindi songs are often sampled in some of today's hits and even songs from over the years; songs like "Whoopty" by CJ came from the Bollywood title song "Sanam Re", even Britney Spears' song "Toxic" came from an old school Hindi film song.

== Hindi film dance ==
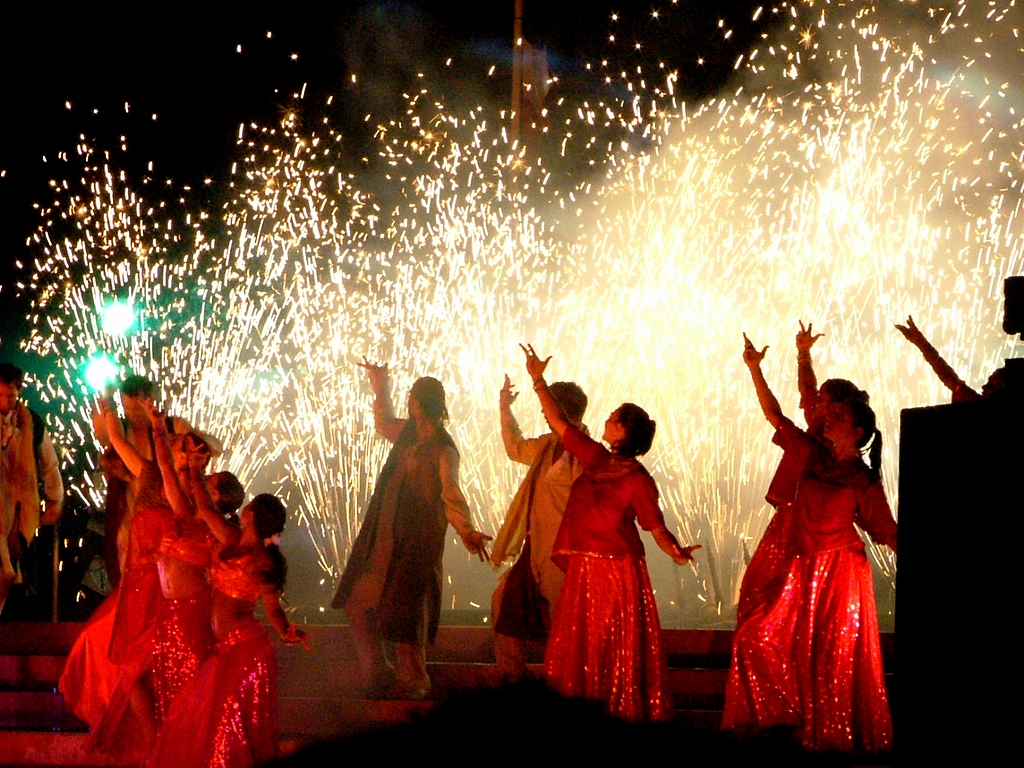
Bollywood dances usually follow filmi songs.

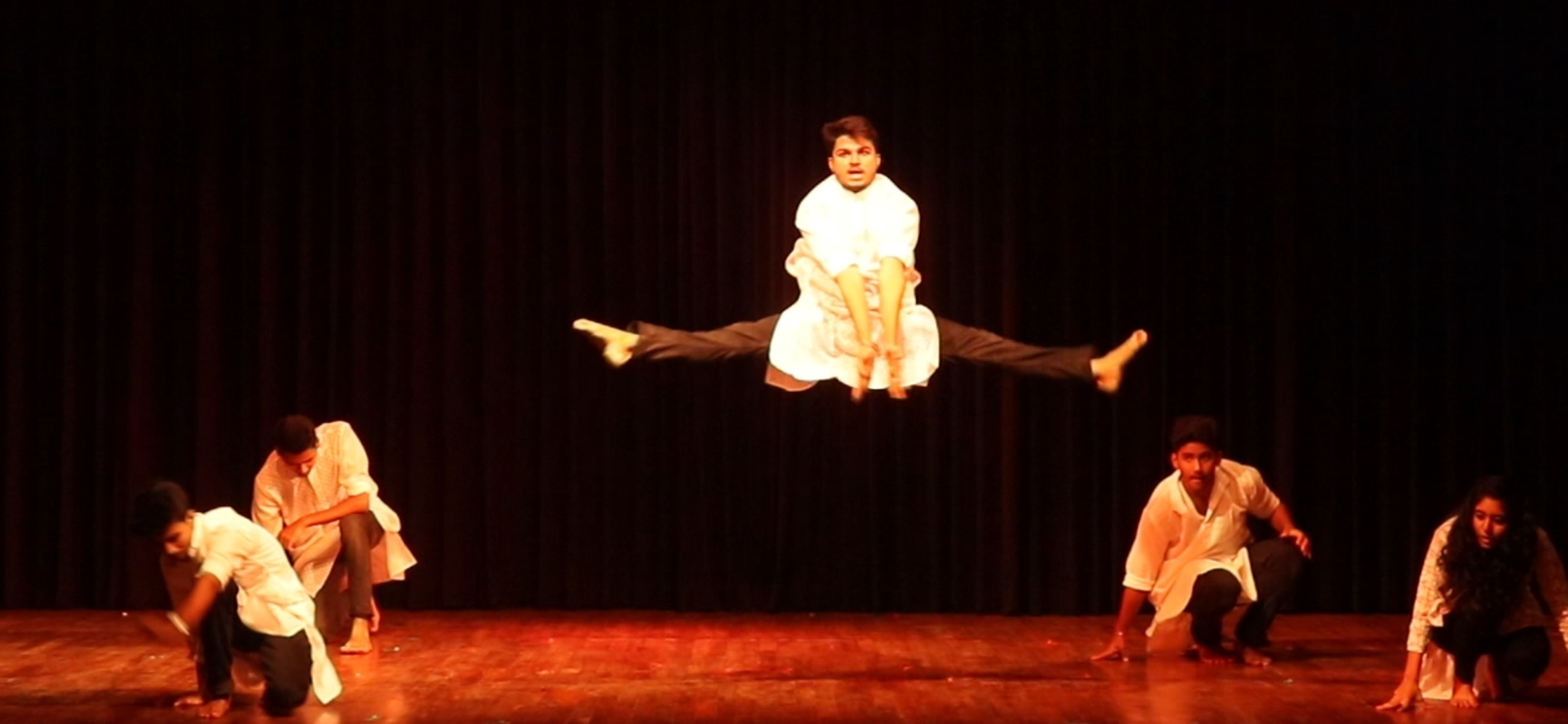
Bollywood dance performance by students in college.

The filmi music and dances in Hindi films are a synthesis of formal and folk Indian traditional music and dance traditions, in fusion with Middle Eastern techniques. The dances in older Hindi films represented supposed dances of the common people, although they involved original choreography. Bollywood dances have evolved as a unique and energetic style. Since they are group dances, they are often used as joyful exercise music. The style of dance has also highly influenced international artists and appears in songs such as "Don't Phunk with My Heart", "Come & Get It", "Legendary Lovers", "Bounce" and "Never Give Up" as well as EDM hit "Lean On", "Biba", "Goosebump" (which is soundtrack of Kung Fu Yoga), "Show" and Eurovision-winning song "Toy".

The choreography of Hindi film dances takes inspiration from Indian folk dances, classical dances (like kathak) as well as disco and from earlier Hindi filmi dances.

== Hindi film choreographers ==
Some of the notable choreographers of past years were

- B. Sohanlal (Sahib Bibi Aur Ghulam, Jewel Thief, Chaudhvin ka Chand)
- Lachhu Maharaj (Mahal, Pakeezah, Mughal-e-Azam)
- Chiman Seth (Mother India)
- Krishna Kumar (Awaara, Madhosh, Andaz)

Among the modern choreographers the notable are:

- Shiamak Davar (Taal, Bunty aur Babli, Dil To Pagal Hai)
- Saroj Khan (Baazigar, Soldier, Veer-Zaara)
- Ahmed Khan (Rangeela, Pardes, Mere Yaar Ki Shaadi Hai)
- Raju Khan (Lagaan, Krrish)
- Vaibhavi Merchant (Dhoom, Swades, Rang de Basanti)
- Remo (Jo Bole So Nihal, Pyaar Ke Side Effects, Waqt)
- Farah Khan (Kabhi Khushi Kabhie Gham, Monsoon Wedding, Dil Chahta Hai)
- Piyush Bhagat and Shazia Samji "Hook Up Song" from the movie (Student of the Year 2)

== See also ==
- Dance music
- Babul (Hindi word)
- Item number
- Hindi wedding songs
