= Taniec z gwiazdami season 9 =

Taniec z gwiazdami
- Season 9
- Hosted by: Piotr Gąsowski; Katarzyna Skrzynecka
- Judges: Iwona Pavlović; Piotr Galiński; Beata Tyszkiewicz; Zbigniew Wodecki
- Celebrity winner: Dorota Gardias
- Professional winner: Andrej Mosejcuk
- No. of episodes: 11

Release
- Original network: TVN
- Original release: 8 March – 17 May 2009

Season chronology
- ← Previous; 8 Next → 10

The 9th season of Taniec z Gwiazdami, the Polish edition of Dancing With the Stars, started on 6 September 2009 and ended on 29 November 2009. It was broadcast by TVN. Katarzyna Skrzynecka and Piotr Gąsowski continued as the hosts, and the judges were: Iwona Szymańska-Pavlović, Zbigniew Wodecki, Beata Tyszkiewicz and Piotr Galiński.

On 17 May, Dorota Gardias and her partner Andrej Mosejcuk were crowned the champions.

== Couples ==
Celebrity	Occupation	Professional partner	Status
Weronika Książkiewicz	Film and television actress	Rafał Maserak	Withdrew on 8 March 2009
Tomasz Sobczak	Film and television actor	Katarzyna Krupa	Eliminated 1st on 15 March 2009
Dorota Deląg	39 i pół actress	Marcin Hakiel	Eliminated 2nd on 22 March 2009
Marcin Chochlew	Na Wspólnej actor	Janja Lesar	Eliminated 3rd on 29 March 2009
Francys Sudnicka	Model	Łukasz Czarnecki	Eliminated 4th on 5 April 2009
Wojciech Medyński	Film and television actor	Izabela Janachowska	Eliminated 5th on 12 April 2009
Paweł Nastula	Judoka & Mixed martial artist	Magdalena Soszyńska-Michno	Eliminated 6th on 19 April 2009
Anna Nowak-Ibisz	Soap opera actress	Cezary Olszewski †	Eliminated 7th on 26 April 2009
Monika Richardson	TVP presenter	Krzysztof Hulboj	Eliminated 8th on 3 May 2009
Jay Delano	Former R'n'G singer	Kamila Kajak	Third place on 10 May 2009
Bartek Kasprzykowski	Film and television actor	Blanka Winiarska	Second place on 17 May 2009
Dorota Gardias	Model & TVN weather presenter	Andrej Mosejcuk	Winners on 17 May 2009

== Scores ==
Couple	Place	1	2	1+2	3	4	5	6	7	8	9	10	11
Dorota & Andrej	1	34	38†	72†	40†	40†	33	40†	38†	36	40+38=78†	39+35=74†	40+40+40=120
Bartek & Blanka	2	35†	33	68	31	40†	38	40†	34	40†	40+33=73	36+29=65	40+40+40=120
Jay & Kamila	3	32	34	66	34	32	40†	38	33	35	33+33=66‡	30+34=64‡	
Monika & Krzysztof	4	31	37	68	32	37	40†	35	37	36	34+38=72		
Anna & Cezary	5	25	26	51	34	38	32	29	30	28‡			
Paweł & Magdalena	6	26	19	45	28	20‡	28	24‡	20‡				
Wojciech & Izabela	7	33	34	67	31	37	30	34					
Francys & Łukasz	8	20‡	18‡	38‡	21‡	29	23‡						
Marcin & Janja	9	20‡	22	42	22	33							
Dorota & Marcin	10	26	20	46	28								
Tomasz & Katarzyna	11	25	29	54									
Weronika & Rafał	12	—											

Red numbers indicate the lowest score for each week.
Green numbers indicate the highest score for each week.
indicates the couple eliminated that week.
indicates the returning couple that finished in the bottom two.
indicates the winning couple of the week.
indicates the runner-up of the week.
indicates the third place couple of the week.
indicates the couple withdrew from the competition.

Notes:

Week 1: Bartek Kasprzykowski scored 35 out of 40 on his first dance (Waltz), making it the highest Week 1 score in this episode. Francys Barraza Sudnicka and Marcin Chochlew got 20 points for their Cha-cha-cha, making it the lowest score of the week. Because of Weronika's dance was scheduled the first one but the actress announced her withdrawal from the show, even though she decided to dance her first Cha-cha-cha. Weronika's withdrawal, there was no elimination this week.

Week 2: Dorota Gardias scored 38 out of 40 for her Rumba, making it the highest Week 2 score in history of the show, thereby equalizing the record obtained by Marta Żmuda-Trzebiatowska in Season 8. Francys Barraza Sudnicka got 20 points for her Quickstep, making it the lowest score of the week and this season. Tomasz & Katarzyna were eliminated despite being 11 points from the bottom.

Week 3: Dorota Gardias received the first perfect score of the season as well as the earliest perfect score in history of the show, thereby equalizing the record obtained by Mateusz Damięcki (Season 6), Agata Kulesza and Alan Andersz (both Season 8). Francys Barraza Sudnicka got 21 points for her Jive, making it the lowest score of the week, which led them to be on the bottom of the leaderboard for the third consecutive week. Dorota & Marcin were eliminated despite being 7 points from the bottom.

Week 4: Bartek Kasprzykowski received his first perfect score for the Paso Doble and Dorota Gardias received her second perfect score for the Paso Doble. Paweł Nastula got 20 points for his Paso Doble, making it the lowest score of the week. Marcin & Janja were eliminated despite being 13 points from the bottom.

Week 5: Monika Richardson received her first perfect score for the Viennese Waltz and Jay Delano received his first perfect score for the Samba, which was the first perfect score for samba in history of the show. Francys Barraza Sudnicka got 23 points for her Viennese Waltz, making it the lowest score of the week. Francys & Łukasz were eliminated.

Week 6: All couples danced to songs from famous comedy movies. Bartek Kasprzykowski received his second perfect score for the Quickstep and Dorota Gardias received her third perfect score for the Foxtrot. Paweł Nastula got 24 points for his Jive, making it the lowest score of the week. Wojciech & Izabela were eliminated despite being 10 points from the bottom.

Week 7: All couples danced to Spanish songs. Dorota Gardias scored 38 out of 40 on her dance (Cha-cha-cha), making it the highest Week 7 score in this episode. Paweł Nastula got 20 points for his Cha-cha-cha, making it the lowest score of the week. Paweł & Magdalena were eliminated.

Week 8: All couples danced to Polish songs. Bartek Kasprzykowski received his third perfect score for the Foxtrot. Anna Nowak-Ibisz got 28 points for her Samba, making it the lowest score of the week. Anna & Cezary were eliminated.

Week 9: Bartek Kasprzykowski received his 4th perfect score for the Viennese Waltz and Dorota Gardias received her 4th perfect score for the Quickstep. Jay Delano got 3 points for his Paso Doble and Quickstep, making it the lowest score of the week. Monika & Krzysztof were eliminated despite being 6 points from the bottom.

Week 10: Dorota Gardias scored 39 out of 40 on her dance (Viennese Waltz), making it the highest Week 10 score in this episode. Jay & Kamila were eliminated.

Week 11: Both Dorota Gardias and Bartek Kasprzykowski got 120 out of 120 points, making it the first-season finale in a row with both couples getting the highest possible score. Both couples had to perform three dances: their favorite Latin dance, their favorite Ballroom dance and a Freestyle. Dorota Gardias won the competition, having cast 60.28 percent of the votes. This is the 6th time the winner was on the first place according to the judges' scoreboard.

== Average chart ==
Rank by average	Place	Couple	Average	Total	Best Score	Worst Score
1.	1.	Dorota Gardias & Andrej Mosejcuk	38	571	40	33
2.	2.	Bartek Kasprzykowski & Blanka Winiarska	37	549	40	29
3.	4.	Monika Richardson & Krzysztof Hulboj	36	357	40	31
4.	3.	Jay Delano & Kamila Kajak	34	408	40	30
5.	7.	Wojciech Medyński & Izabela Janachowska	33	199	37	30
6.	5.	Anna Nowak & Cezary Olszewski	30	242	38	25
7.	11.	Tomasz Sobczak & Katarzyna Krupa	27	54	29	25
8.	10.	Dorota Deląg & Marcin Hakiel	24	74	28	20
9.	9.	Marcin Chochlew & Janja Lesar	24	97	33	20
10.	6.	Paweł Nastula & Magdalena Soszyńska-Michno	23	165	28	19
11.	8.	Francys Barraza Sudnicka & Łukasz Czarnecki	22	111	29	18
12.	12.	Weronika Książkiewicz & Rafał Maserak	0	0	–	–
Everyteam			32	2829		

== Average dance chart ==
Couples	Averages	Best Dances	Worst Dances
Dorota & Andrej	38.1	Tango (twice), Paso Doble, Foxtrot, Quickstep, Rumba, Freestyle (40)	Samba (33)
Bartek & Blanka	36.6	Paso Doble (twice), Quickstep (twice), Foxtrot, Viennese Waltz, Freestyle (40)	Tango (29)
Monika & Krzysztof	35.7	Viennese Waltz (40)	Waltz (31)
Jay & Kamila	34.0	Samba (40)	Viennese Waltz (30)
Wojciech & Izabela	33.1	Foxtrot (37)	Samba (30)
Anna & Cezary	30.2	Paso Doble (38)	Waltz (25)
Tomasz & Katarzyna	27.0	Quickstep (29)	Cha-Cha-Cha (25)
Dorota & Marcin	24.6	Jive (28)	Quickstep (20)
Marcin & Janja	24.3	Foxtrot (33)	Cha-Cha-Cha (20)
Paweł & Magdalena	23.5	Tango, Viennese Waltz (28)	Rumba (19)
Francys & Łukasz	22.2	Foxtrot (29)	Quickstep (18)

== Highest and lowest scoring performances ==
The best and worst performances in each dance according to the judges' marks are as follows:

Dance	Best dancer	Best score	Worst dancer	Worst score
Cha-Cha-Cha	Dorota Gardias	38	Paweł Nastula; Francys Barraza Sudnicka; Marcin Chochlew	20
Waltz	Monika Richardson	38	Anna Nowak-Ibisz	25
Quickstep	Bartek Kasprzykowski; Dorota Gardias	40	Francys Barraza Sudnicka	18
Rumba	Dorota Gardias	40	Paweł Nastula	19
Jive	Bartek Kasprzykowski; Dorota Gardias	36	Francys Barraza Sudnicka	21
Tango	Dorota Gardias	40	Paweł Nastula	28
Foxtrot	Bartek Kasprzykowski; Dorota Gardias	40	Francys Barraza Sudnicka	29
Paso Doble	Bartek Kasprzykowski; Dorota Gardias	40	Paweł Nastula	20
Samba	Jay Delano	40	Anna Nowak-Ibisz	28
Viennese Waltz	Monika Richardson; Bartek Kasprzykowski	40	Francys Barraza Sudnicka	23
Freestyle	Bartek Kasprzykowski; Dorota Gardias	40		

== The Best Score (40) ==
Couple	Dance	Episode
Dorota Gardias & Andrej Mosejcuk	Tango	3
Dorota Gardias & Andrej Mosejcuk	Paso Doble	4
Dorota Gardias & Andrej Mosejcuk	Foxtrot	6
Dorota Gardias & Andrej Mosejcuk	Quickstep	9
Dorota Gardias & Andrej Mosejcuk	Rumba	11
Dorota Gardias & Andrej Mosejcuk	Tango	11
Dorota Gardias & Andrej Mosejcuk	Freestyle	11
Bartek Kasprzykowski & Blanka Winiarska	Paso Doble	4
Bartek Kasprzykowski & Blanka Winiarska	Quickstep	6
Bartek Kasprzykowski & Blanka Winiarska	Foxtrot	8
Bartek Kasprzykowski & Blanka Winiarska	Viennese Waltz	9
Bartek Kasprzykowski & Blanka Winiarska	Paso Doble	11
Bartek Kasprzykowski & Blanka Winiarska	Quickstep	11
Bartek Kasprzykowski & Blanka Winiarska	Freestyle	11
Jay Delano & Kamila Kajak	Samba	5
Monika Richardson & Krzysztof Hulboj	Viennese Waltz	5

== Episodes ==
=== Week 1 ===
Individual judges scores in charts below (given in parentheses) are listed in this order from left to right: Iwona Szymańska-Pavlović, Zbigniew Wodecki, Beata Tyszkiewicz and Piotr Galiński.

Running order

Couple	Score	Style	Music
Weronika & Rafał	N/A	Cha-Cha-Cha	"American Pie" — Don McLean
Paweł & Magdalena	26 (4,7,9,6)	Waltz	"When I Fall in Love" — Rick Astley
Dorota & Marcin	26 (5,7,8,6)	Cha-Cha-Cha	"Heart of Glass" – Blondie
Anna & Cezary	25 (6,6,8,5)	Waltz	"Amazing Grace" – John Newton
Jay & Kamila	32 (7,9,9,7)	Cha-Cha-Cha	"Amor Verdadero" — Jose Marquetti
Wojciech & Izabela	33 (7,9,9,8)	Waltz	"Fascination" — Jane Morgan
Francys & Łukasz	20 (3,7,7,3)	Cha-Cha-Cha	"Guantanamera" — Joseíto Fernández
Dorota & Andrej	34 (8,9,9,8)	Waltz	"Mały Książę" — Katarzyna Sobczyk
Tomasz & Katarzyna	25 (4,8,8,5)	Cha-Cha-Cha	"What Am I Gonna Do (I'm So in Love with You)" — Rod Stewart
Monika & Krzysztof	31 (6,9,9,7)	Waltz	"Just Once" — Quincy Jones & James Ingram
Marcin & Janja	20 (3,7,7,3)	Cha-Cha-Cha	"Heaven Is a Place on Earth" — Belinda Carlisle
Bartek & Blanka	35 (8,9,10,8)	Waltz	"Without You" — Mariah Carey

=== Week 2 ===
Running order

Couple	Score	Style	Music
Wojciech & Izabela	34 (8,9,9,8)	Rumba	"Sealed with a Kiss" — Bobby Vinton
Marcin & Janja	22 (4,6,8,4)	Quickstep	"Top of the World" — The Carpenters
Dorota & Andrej	38 (9,10,10,9)	Rumba	"Diamonds Are Forever" – Shirley Bassey
Francys & Łukasz	18 (2,7,7,2)	Quickstep	"When the Saints Go Marching In" — James Milton Black
Monika & Krzysztof	37 (8,10,10,9)	Rumba	"Shape of My Heart" — Sting
Tomasz & Katarzyna	29 (5,9,9,6)	Quickstep	"I Got Rhythm" — Judy Garland
Paweł & Magdalena	19 (2,7,8,2)	Rumba	"Sign Your Name" — Terence Trent D'Arby
Dorota & Marcin	20 (2,8,7,3)	Quickstep	"East of the Rockies" — Sydney Robin & Lou Singer
Bartek & Blanka	33 (7,9,9,8)	Rumba	"Your Song" — Elton John
Jay & Kamila	34 (6,10,10,8)	Quickstep	"You Wanna Be Americano" — Lou Bega
Anna & Cezary	26 (5,8,8,5)	Rumba	"Walk On By" — Dionne Warwick

=== Week 3 ===
Running order

Couple	Score	Style	Music
Francys & Łukasz	21 (3,7,8,3)	Jive	"Be My Guest" — Fats Domino
Bartek & Blanka	31 (6,9,9,7)	Tango	"Catch Me If You Can" — Matt Pokora
Jay & Kamila	34 (7,10,10,7)	Jive	"You Never Can Tell" — Chuck Berry
Monika & Krzysztof	32 (6,9,9,8)	Tango	"Last Tango in Paris" — Gato Barbieri
Dorota & Marcin	28 (5,8,8,7)	Jive	"Shake" — Sam Cooke
Anna & Cezary	34 (8,9,9,8)	Tango	"Hot Stuff" — Donna Summer
Marcin & Janja	22 (4,7,8,3)	Jive	"So Long" — ABBA
Dorota & Andrej	40 (10,10,10,10)	Tango	"Twist in My Sobriety" — Tanita Tikaram
Wojciech & Izabela	31 (6,9,9,7)	Jive	"I'm Still Standing" — Elton John
Paweł & Magdalena	28 (5,8,9,6)	Tango	"Jealousy" — Paris Hilton

=== Week 4 ===
Running order

Couple	Score	Style	Music
Monika & Krzysztof	37 (8,10,10,9)	Paso Doble	"Baila Torero" — Orquestra Del Tendido
Jay & Kamila	32 (6,9,9,8)	Foxtrot	"Sweet About Me" — Gabriella Cilmi
Paweł & Magdalena	20 (2,7,8,3)	Paso Doble	"Espana Cani" — Pascual Marquina Narro
Wojciech & Izabela	37 (8,10,10,9)	Foxtrot	"C'est Si Bon" — Eartha Kitt
Anna & Cezary	38 (9,10,10,9)	Paso Doble	"Tragedy" — Bee Gees
Marcin & Janja	33 (7,9,9,8)	Foxtrot	"These Foolish Things (Remind Me of You)" — Rod Stewart
Bartek & Blanka	40 (10,10,10,10)	Paso Doble	"Ayo Mi Son" — Legin Resel
Francys & Łukasz	29 (5,8,9,7)	Foxtrot	"You and the Night and the Music" — Arthur Schwartz
Dorota & Andrej	40 (10,10,10,10)	Paso Doble	"La Campanera" — Aniceto Molina

=== Week 5 ===
Running order

Couple	Score	Style	Music
Dorota & Andrej	33 (7,9,10,7)	Samba	"Sing It Back" — Moloko
Anna & Cezary	32 (8,8,9,7)	Viennese Waltz	"Sophie" — Tomasz Szymuś
Wojciech & Izabela	30 (6,9,9,6)	Samba	"Volare" — Domenico Modugno
Francys & Łukasz	23 (3,8,8,4)	Viennese Waltz	"On the Hills of Manchuria" – Ilya Shatrov
Bartek & Blanka	38 (10,9,10,9)	Samba	"Tequila" — The Champs
Paweł & Magdalena	28 (6,8,9,5)	Viennese Waltz	"Morning Has Broken" — Cat Stevens
Jay & Kamila	40 (10,10,10,10)	Samba	"Black Machine" — Jazz Machine
Monika & Krzysztof	40 (10,10,10,10)	Viennese Waltz	"Once Upon A December" — Stephen Flaherty

=== Week 6: Movie Themes Week ===
Running order

Couple	Score	Style	Music
Anna & Cezary	29 (5,8,9,7)	Cha-Cha-Cha	"Ghostbusters" — Ray Parker Jr.
Wojciech & Izabela	34 (7,9,10,8)	Tango	"La Cumparsita" — Gerardo Matos Rodríguez
Monika & Krzysztof	35 (7,10,10,8)	Samba	"Soul Bossa Nova" — Quincy Jones
Bartek & Blanka	40 (10,10,10,10)	Quickstep	"Alternatywy 4" — Jerzy Matuszkiewicz
Paweł & Magdalena	24 (4,7,9,4)	Jive	"The Heat Is On" — Glenn Frey
Dorota & Andrej	40 (10,10,10,10)	Foxtrot	"Love and Marriage" — Frank Sinatra
Jay & Kamila	38 (8,10,10,10)	Rumba	"When You Say Nothing at All" — Keith Whitley
Anna & Cezary; Wojciech & Izabela; Monika & Krzysztof; Bartek & Blanka; Paweł & Magdalena; Dorota & Andrej; Jay & Kamila	N/A	Group Swing	"The Pink Panther Theme" — Henry Mancini

=== Week 7: Spanish Week ===
Running order

Couple	Score	Style	Music
Bartek & Blanka	34 (8,9,10,7)	Cha-Cha-Cha	"Cuéntame que te pasó" – Rosario Flores
Monika & Krzysztof	37 (9,10,10,8)	Quickstep	"Quince amos tiene mi amor" — Ramon Arcusa
Paweł & Magdalena	20 (2,8,8,2)	Cha-Cha-Cha	"I Need to Know" — Marc Anthony
Jay & Kamila	33 (6,10,10,7)	Tango	"Carmen" — Georges Bizet
Dorota & Andrej	38 (9,10,10,9)	Cha-Cha-Cha	"Marcia Baila" — Les Rita Mitsouko
Anna & Cezary	30 (5,8,10,7)	Foxtrot	"Volveras" — Gloria Estefan
Bartek & Blanka; Monika & Krzysztof; Paweł & Magdalena; Jay & Kamila; Dorota & Andrej; Anna & Cezary	N/A	Group Salsa	"Cambio Dolor" — Natalia Oreiro

=== Week 8: Polish Week ===
Running order

Couple	Score	Style	Music
Dorota & Andrej	36 (9,9,10,8)	Jive	"Wszystko mi mówi, że mnie ktoś pokochał" — Skaldowie
Jay & Kamila	35 (7,9,10,9)	Waltz	"Czy mnie jeszcze pamiętasz?" — Czesław Niemen
Anna & Cezary	28 (5,8,9,6)	Samba	"Ciągle pada" — Czerwone Gitary
Bartek & Blanka	40 (10,10,10,10)	Foxtrot	"Zacznij od Bacha" — Zbigniew Wodecki
Monika & Krzysztof	36 (8,10,10,8)	Cha-Cha-Cha	"Do nieba, do piekła" — Blue Café
Dorota & Andrej; Jay & Kamila; Anna & Cezary; Bartek & Blanka; Monika & Krzysztof	N/A	Group Viennese Waltz	"To, co chciałbym Ci dać" — Pectus

=== Week 9 ===
Running order

Couple	Score	Style	Music
Jay & Kamila	33 (7,9,9,8)	Paso Doble	"Viva España" – Leo Caerts
Jay & Kamila	33 (6,10,10,7)	Quickstep	"Just a Girl" — No Doubt
Bartek & Blanka	40 (10,10,10,10)	Viennese Waltz	"The Highlander Theme" — Michael Kamen
Bartek & Blanka	33 (7,9,10,7)	Rumba	"Kiss Me" — Sixpence None the Richer
Monika & Krzysztof	34 (7,9,10,8)	Jive	"In the Mood" – Glenn Miller
Monika & Krzysztof	38 (9,10,10,9)	Waltz	"Nothing Compares 2 U" — Sinéad O'Connor
Dorota & Andrej	40 (10,10,10,10)	Quickstep	"Vabank" — Henryk Kuźniak
Dorota & Andrej	38 (9,10,10,9)	Paso Doble	"By the Way" — Red Hot Chili Peppers

=== Week 10 ===
Running order

Couple	Score	Style	Music
Dorota & Andrej	39 (10,10,10,9)	Viennese Waltz	"Have You Ever Really Loved A Woman" – Bryan Adams
Dorota & Andrej	35 (8,10,10,7)	Cha-Cha-Cha	"Honey, Honey" — ABBA
Bartek & Blanka	36 (9,10,10,7)	Jive	"See You Later Alligator" — Bill Haley & His Comets
Bartek & Blanka	29 (6,9,9,5)	Tango	"To Tylko Tango" — Maanam
Jay & Kamila	30 (6,9,10,5)	Viennese Waltz	"Have I Told You Lately" – Van Morrison
Jay & Kamila	34 (8,9,10,7)	Jive	"Mambo No.5" — Lou Bega

=== Week 11: Final ===
Running order

Couple	Score	Style	Music
Bartek & Blanka	40 (10,10,10,10)	Paso Doble	"Ayo Mi Son" – Legin Resel
Bartek & Blanka	40 (10,10,10,10)	Quickstep	"Alternatywy 4" – Jerzy Matuszkiewicz
Bartek & Blanka	40 (10,10,10,10)	Freestyle	"Nokturn" opus no. 9 – Frédéric Chopin
Dorota & Andrej	40 (10,10,10,10)	Rumba	"Diamonds Are Forever" – Shirley Bassey
Dorota & Andrej	40 (10,10,10,10)	Tango	"Twist in My Sobriety" – Tanita Tikaram
Dorota & Andrej	40 (10,10,10,10)	Freestyle	"The Battle" – Hans Zimmer

Other Dances

Couple	Style	Music
Jay & Kamila	Samba	"Black Machine" — Jazz Machine
Monika & Krzysztof	Tango	"Last Tango in Paris" — Gato Barbieri
Anna & Cezary	Paso Doble	"Tragedy" — Bee Gees
Paweł & Magdalena	Viennese Waltz	"Morning Has Broken" — Cat Stevens
Wojciech & Izabela	Rumba	"Sealed with a Kiss" — Bobby Vinton
Francys & Łukasz	Jive	"Be My Guest" — Fats Domino
Marcin & Janja	Jive	"So Long" — ABBA
Dorota & Marcin	Quickstep	"East of the Rockies" — Sydney Robin & Lou Singer
Tomasz & Katarzyna	Cha-Cha-Cha	"What Am I Gonna Do (I'm So in Love with You)" — Rod Stewart
Agata Kulesza & Stefano Terrazzino (8th Season Winner)	Freestyle	"Song from a Secret Garden" – Secret Garden
Tomasz & Katarzyna; Dorota & Marcin; Marcin & Janja; Francys & Łukasz; Wojciech & Izabela; Anna & Cezary; Monika & Krzysztof; Jay & Kamila	Group Freestyle	"Boogie Wonderland" — Earth, Wind & Fire

== Dance chart ==
The celebrities and professional partners danced one of these routines for each corresponding week.

- Week 1 (Season Premiere): Cha-Cha-Cha or Waltz
- Week 2: Rumba or Quickstep
- Week 3: Jive or Tango
- Week 4: Paso Doble or Foxtrot
- Week 5: Samba or Viennese Waltz
- Week 6 (Movie Themes Week): One unlearned dance & Group Swing
- Week 7 (Spanish Week): One unlearned dance & Group Salsa
- Week 8 (Polish Week): One unlearned dance & Group Viennese Waltz
- Week 9: One unlearned & one repeated dance
- Week 10 (The Semifinal): One unlearned & one repeated dance
- Week 11 (The Final): Favorite Latin dance, favorite Ballroom dance & Freestyle

Couple	Week 1	Week 2	Week 3	Week 4	Week 5	Week 6		Week 7		Week 8		Week 9		Week 10		Week 11 Final		
Dorota & Andrej	Waltz	Rumba	Tango	Paso Doble	Samba	Foxtrot	Group Swing	Cha-Cha-Cha	Group Salsa	Jive	Group Viennese Waltz	Quickstep	Paso Doble	Viennese Waltz	Cha-Cha-Cha	Rumba	Tango	Freestyle
Bartek & Blanka	Waltz	Rumba	Tango	Paso Doble	Samba	Quickstep	Group Swing	Cha-Cha-Cha	Group Salsa	Foxtrot	Group Viennese Waltz	Viennese Waltz	Rumba	Jive	Tango	Paso Doble	Quickstep	Freestyle
Jay & Kamila	Cha-Cha-Cha	Quickstep	Jive	Foxtrot	Samba	Rumba	Group Swing	Tango	Group Salsa	Waltz	Group Viennese Waltz	Paso Doble	Quickstep	Viennese Waltz	Jive			Samba
Monika & Krzysztof	Waltz	Rumba	Tango	Paso Doble	Viennese Waltz	Samba	Group Swing	Quickstep	Group Salsa	Cha-Cha-Cha	Group Viennese Waltz	Jive	Waltz					Tango
Anna & Cezary	Waltz	Rumba	Tango	Paso Doble	Viennese Waltz	Cha-Cha-Cha	Group Swing	Foxtrot	Group Salsa	Samba	Group Viennese Waltz							Paso Doble
Paweł & Magdalena	Waltz	Rumba	Tango	Paso Doble	Viennese Waltz	Jive	Group Swing	Cha-Cha-Cha	Group Salsa									Viennese Waltz
Wojciech & Izabela	Waltz	Rumba	Jive	Foxtrot	Samba	Tango	Group Swing											Rumba
Francys & Łukasz	Cha-Cha-Cha	Quickstep	Jive	Foxtrot	Viennese Waltz													Jive
Marcin & Janja	Cha-Cha-Cha	Quickstep	Jive	Foxtrot														Jive
Dorota & Marcin	Cha-Cha-Cha	Quickstep	Jive															Quickstep
Tomasz & Katarzyna	Cha-Cha-Cha	Quickstep																Cha-Cha-Cha
Weronika & Rafał	Cha-Cha-Cha																	

Highest scoring dance
Lowest scoring dance
Performed, but not scored

== Weekly results ==
The order is based on the judges' scores combined with the viewers' votes.

Order	Week 1	Week 2	Week 3	Week 4	Week 5	Week 6	Week 7	Week 8	Week 9	Week 10	Week 11 Final
1	Dorota & Andrej	Dorota & Andrej	Dorota & Andrej	Dorota & Andrej	Monika & Krzysztof	Dorota & Andrej	Dorota & Andrej	Dorota & Andrej	Dorota & Andrej	Bartek & Blanka	Dorota & Andrej
2	Bartek & Blanka	Bartek & Blanka	Jay & Kamila	Bartek & Blanka	Jay & Kamila	Bartek & Blanka	Monika & Krzysztof	Bartek & Blanka	Bartek & Blanka	Dorota & Andrej	Bartek & Blanka
3	–	Jay & Kamila	Paweł & Magdalena	Monika & Krzysztof	Dorota & Andrej	Jay & Kamila	Jay & Kamila	Monika & Krzysztof	Jay & Kamila	Jay & Kamila	
4	–	Monika & Krzysztof	Bartek & Blanka	Wojciech & Izabela	Bartek & Blanka	Monika & Krzysztof	Bartek & Blanka	Jay & Kamila	Monika & Krzysztof		
5	–	Wojciech & Izabela	Monika & Krzysztof	Anna & Cezary	Paweł & Magdalena	Paweł & Magdalena	Anna & Cezary	Anna & Cezary			
6	–	Paweł & Magdalena	Anna & Cezary	Paweł & Magdalena	Wojciech & Izabela	Anna & Cezary	Paweł & Magdalena				
7	–	Francys & Łukasz	Francys & Łukasz	Francys & Łukasz	Anna & Cezary	Wojciech & Izabela					
8	–	Dorota & Marcin	Wojciech & Izabela	Jay & Kamila	Francys & Łukasz						
9	–	Marcin & Janja	Marcin & Janja	Marcin & Janja							
10	–	Anna & Cezary	Dorota & Marcin								
11	–	Tomasz & Katarzyna									
12	Weronika & Rafał										

This couple came in first place with the judges.
This couple came in first place with the judges and gained the highest number of viewers' votes.
This couple gained the highest number of viewers' votes.
This couple came in last place with the judges.
This couple came in last place with the judges and was eliminated.
This couple was eliminated.
This couple withdrew from the competition.
This couple won the competition.
This couple came in second in the competition.
This couple came in third in the competition.

== Audience voting results ==
The percentage of votes cast by a couple in a particular week is given in parentheses.

Order	Week 2	Week 3	Week 4	Week 5	Week 6	Week 7	Week 8	Week 9	Week 10	Week 11 Final
1	Dorota & Andrej (19.26)	Dorota & Andrej (37.07)	Dorota & Andrej (35.1)	Dorota & Andrej (22.3)	Dorota & Andrej (23.89)	Dorota & Andrej (27.08)	Dorota & Andrej (24.75)	Dorota & Andrej (34.61)	Bartek & Blanka (40.52)	Dorota & Andrej (60.28)
2	Bartek & Blanka (15.87)	Paweł & Magdalena (10.86)	Bartek & Blanka (15.05)	Monika & Krzysztof (19.2)	Bartek & Blanka (17.88)	Jay & Kamila (16.42)	Bartek & Blanka (24.57)	Bartek & Blanka (24.3)	Dorota & Andrej (38.94)	Bartek & Blanka (39.72)
3	Paweł & Magdalena (14.2)	Francys & Łukasz (7.89)	Paweł & Magdalena (12.5)	Jay & Kamila (14.78)	Jay & Kamila (13.86)	Monika & Krzysztof (16.02)	Monika & Krzysztof (20.11)	Jay & Kamila (20.77)	Jay & Kamila (20.54)	
4	Jay & Kamila (9.22)	Jay & Kamila (7.44)	Monika & Krzysztof (8.16)	Bartek & Blanka (11.45)	Paweł & Magdalena (13.76)	Bartek & Blanka (14.62)	Jay & Kamila (19.27)	Monika & Krzysztof (20.32)		
5	Francys & Łukasz (8.54)	Marcin & Janja (7.36)	Francys & Łukasz (7.01)	Paweł & Magdalena (9.89)	Anna & Cezary (13.01)	Anna & Cezary (13.79)	Anna & Cezary (11.3)			
6	Monika & Krzysztof (7.97)	Bartek & Blanka (7.2)	Wojciech & Izabela (6.94)	Francys & Łukasz (9.17)	Monika & Krzysztof (8.91)	Paweł & Magdalena (12.07)				
7	Wojciech & Izabela (6.29)	Monika & Krzysztof (6.62)	Jay & Kamila (5.82)	Wojciech & Izabela (7.77)	Wojciech & Izabela (8.69)					
8	Dorota & Marcin (5.58)	Wojciech & Izabela (6.15)	Anna & Cezary (4.94)	Anna & Cezary (5.44)						
9	Marcin & Janja (5.14)	Anna & Cezary (5.46)	Marcin & Janja (4.4)							
10	Anna & Cezary (4.17)	Dorota & Marcin (3.95)								
11	Tomasz & Katarzyna (3.76)									

== Guest performances ==
Episode	Date	Singer/Star	Song	Dancer
1	8 March 2009	Tomasz Szymuś's Orchestra	"Dirty Diana"	Ewa Szabatin, Marcin Olszewski, Monika Grzelak, Przemysław Wereszczyński, Katarzyna Vu Manh, Krystian Radziejowski, Sylwia Maczek, Paweł Rymarczyk, Dorota Thomas, Konrad Dąbski & Anna Bosak (Dancers from Kochaj i tańcz)
2	15 March 2009	Tomasz Szymuś's Orchestra	"Do You Love Me"	Group VOLT
3	22 March 2009	Tomasz Szymuś's Orchestra	"Let's Dance"	Group VOLT
4	29 March 2009	Tomasz Szymuś's Orchestra	"Big Spender"	Group VOLT
5	5 April 2009	Piotr Kupicha i Iwona Węgrowska	"Pokonaj siebie"	–
5	5 April 2009	Piotr Kupicha	"Pokaż mi niebo"	Group VOLT
6	12 April 2009	Tomasz Szymuś's Orchestra	"Douliou-douliou Saint-Tropez"	Group VOLT
7	19 April 2009	Tomasz Szymuś's Orchestra	"Furia"	Sangre Flamenco
7	19 April 2009	Tomasz Szymuś's Orchestra	"Flamenco"	Sangre Flamenco
8	26 April 2009	Audiofeels	"Eye of the Tiger" "Hero" "Tragedy"	–
8	26 April 2009	Audiofeels	"Ai No Corrida"	–
9	3 May 2009	Jade Ewen	"It's My Time"
9	3 May 2009	Tomasz Szymuś's Orchestra	"Baila"	Group VOLT
10	10 May 2009	Gabriella Cilmi	"Sweet About Me"	–
10	10 May 2009	Gabriella Cilmi	"Sanctuary"	–
11	17 May 2009	Lenka	"Bring Me Down"	Group VOLT
11	17 May 2009	Lenka	"The Show"	Dorota Gardias & Andrej Mosejcuk; Bartek Kasprzykowski & Blanka Winiarska

== Rating figures ==
Episode	Date	Official rating 4+	Share 4+	Official rating 16–39	Share 16–39
1	8 March 2009	4 319 529	25.14%	1 949 470	24.34%
2	15 March 2009	4 149 096	24.51%	1 802 285	23.22%
3	22 March 2009	4 136 099	23.66%	1 837 412	22.51%
4	29 March 2009	4 091 280	24.12%	1 708 393	22.56%
5	5 April 2009	3 916 182	22.99%	1 567 220	20.67%
6	12 April 2009	3 080 254	19.98%	1 217 633	18.33%
7	19 April 2009	3 644 024	21.58%	1 474 258	19.83%
8	26 April 2009	3 224 559	20.06%	1 326 068	18.83%
9	3 May 2009	3 421 426	21.63%	1 325 175	19.08%
10	10 May 2009	3 484 505	21.84%	1 437 254	21.04%
11	17 May 2009	3 852 979	25.46%	1 535 730	23.58%
Average	Season 9	3 802 880	23.08%	1 587 835	21.58%
