= Twoja twarz brzmi znajomo =

Polish reality TV show

- Genre: Reality celebrity talent show
- Presented by: Maciej Rock; Agnieszka Hyży
- Judges: Małgorzata Walewska; Stefano Terrazzino; Piotr Gąsowski; Justyna Steczkowska
- Country of origin: Poland
- Original language: Polish
- No. of seasons: 23
- No. of episodes: 235 (including 2 Christmas specials; excluding 9 special, non-competitive episodes)

Production
- Production company: Endemol Shine Polska

Original release
- Network: Polsat
- Release: 8 March 2014 – present

Twoja twarz brzmi znajomo (Polish: Your Face Sounds Familiar) is a Polish talent show broadcast by Polsat that is based on the Spanish version of the series. The show involves eight celebrities and/or artists (singers, actors and television personalities) portraying various iconic singers in order to win a cash prize for a charity of their choice.

== Format ==
The show challenges celebrities (singers and actors) to impersonate different music artists every week, which are chosen by the show's "Randomiser". Afterwards they are judged by the panel of celebrity judges. The 'randomiser' can choose any older or younger artist available in the machine, or even a singer of the opposite sex, or a deceased singer. The winner of each episode receives 15,000 PLN (10,000 PLN in seasons 1–22) and the winner of the whole show wins 150,000 PLN (100,000 PLN in seasons 1–22). The 2nd place winner in each episode receives a check for 5,000 PLN, which they donate to charity, a charitable cause; additionally, in the final, the runner-up receives a check for 20,000 PLN, which they also donate to a charitable cause.

=== Voting ===
The contestants are awarded points from the judges (and each other) based on their singing and dance routines. The points go from 1 to 7 and 10, with 10 being the judge's favorite of the night. After that, each contestant gives 5 points to a fellow contestant of their choice (known as "Bonus" points) 1 to 17, from 21, and from 18 to 20 editions awards 4 points. The judges' score is combined with the "Bonus" points.

== Cast ==
=== Hosts ===
Hosts	Season																						
Hosts	1.	2.	3.	4.	5.	6.	7.	8.	9.	10.	11.	12.	13.	14.	15.	16.	17.	18.	19.	20.	21.	22.	23.
Maciej Rock																		●	●	●	●	●	●
Agnieszka Hyży																					●	●	●
Maciej Dowbor	●	●	●	●	●	●	●	●	●	●	●	●	●	●	●	●	●	●	●	●			
Piotr Gąsowski	●	●	●	●	●	●	●	●	●	●	●	●	●	●	●	●	●						

=== Judges ===
Judges	Season																						
Judges	1.	2.	3.	4.	5.	6.	7.	8.	9.	10.	11.	12.	13.	14.	15.	16.	17.	18.	19.	20.	21.	22.	23.
Małgorzata Walewska	●	●	●	●	●	●	●	●	●	●	●	●	●	●	●	●	●	●	●	●	●	●	●
Piotr Gąsowski																				●	●	●	●
Justyna Steczkowska																					●	●	●
Stefano Terrazzino																					●	●	●
Robert Janowski																	●	●	●	●			
Paweł Domagała																		●	●				
Katarzyna Skrzynecka		●	●	●	●	●	●	●	●	●	●	●	●	●	●	●	●						
Michał Wiśniewski															●	●	●						
Krzysztof Cugowski																●							
Andrzej „Gromee” Gromala															●								
Adam Strycharczuk													●	●									
Kacper Kuszewski									●	●	●	●	●	●									
Paweł Królikowski (†)	●	●	●	●	●	●	●	●	●	●	●	●											
Bartłomiej Kasprzykowski					●	●	●	●															
Adam „DJ Adamus” Jaworski	●	●	●	●																			
Katarzyna Kwiatkowska	●																						

Coaches

Coach	Season																						
Coach	1.	2.	3.	4.	5.	6.	7.	8.	9.	10.	11.	12.	13.	14.	15.	16.	17.	18.	19.	20.	21.	22.	23.
Coach	Vocal coach																						
Agnieszka Hekiert	●	●	●	●	●	●	●	●	●	●	●	●	●	●	●	●	●	●	●	●	●	●	●
Nika Lubowicz				●	●	●				●	●	●	●	●	●	●	●	●	●	●			
Izabela Puk							●	●	●	●	●	●	●	●	●	●	●	●	●	●			
Julia Chmielnik	●	●	●	●																			
Alicja Węgorzewska-Whiskerd	●																						
Piotr Hajduk			●																				
Bartosz Caboń				●																			
Paweł Jasionowski					●																		
Agnieszka Wilczyńska					●	●																	
Marcin Miller						●																	
Anna Ozner							●																
Olga Szomańska							●																
Ewelina Kordy								●															
Dance coach
Maciej Zakliczyński																			●	●	●	●	●
Igor Leonik																		●	●	●			
Krzysztof „Kris” Adamski	●	●	●	●	●	●	●	●	●	●	●	●	●	●	●	●	●	●					
Agnieszka Boruta	●	●	●	●	●	●																	
Marcin Olszewski	●																						
Adam Beta							●	●				●	●	●	●								
Adrianna Piechówka												●	●	●	●	●	●	●					
Ernestina Papazyan												●	●	●	●								
Ewelina Adamska-Porczyk												●											

Art directors

Artistic director	Season																						
Artistic director	1.	2.	3.	4.	5.	6.	7.	8.	9.	10.	11.	12.	13.	14.	15.	16.	17.	18.	19.	20.	21.	22.	23.
Agnieszka Hekiert	●	●	●	●	●	●	●	●	●	●	●	●	●	●	●	●	●	●	●	●	●	●	●
Music director	Season																						
Music director	1.	2.	3.	4.	5.	6.	7.	8.	9.	10.	11.	12.	13.	14.	15.	16.	17.	18.	19.	20.	21.	22.	23.
Marcin Urban				●	●	●	●	●	●	●	●	●	●	●	●	●	●	●	●	●	●	●	●
Zygmunt Kukla	●	●	●																				
Creative director (choreography director)	Season																						
Creative director (choreography director)	1.	2.	3.	4.	5.	6.	7.	8.	9.	10.	11.	12.	13.	14.	15.	16.	17.	18.	19.	20.	21.	22.	23.
Maciej Zakliczyński																			●	●	●	●	●
Krzysztof „Kris” Adamski	●	●	●	●	●	●	●	●	●	●	●	●	●	●	●	●	●	●					

== Series overview ==
Season	Broadcast dates	No. of stars	No. of weeks	Celebrity honor places			
Season	Broadcast dates	No. of stars	No. of weeks	Winner	Second place	Third place	Fourth place
1) Spring 2014	March 8 – April 26, 2014	8	8	Katarzyna Skrzynecka	Agnieszka Włodarczyk	Mariusz Totoszko	Artur Chamski
2) Fall 2014	September 6 – November 22, 2014	8	9	Marek Kaliszuk	Marcin Przybylski	Joanna Liszowska	Barbara Melzer
3) Spring 2015	March 7 – May 9, 2015	8	10	Stefano Terrazzino	Robert Rozmus	Grzegorz Wilk	Kaja Paschalska
4) Fall 2015	September 5 – November 7, 2015	8	10	Bartłomiej Kasprzykowski	Zofia Zborowska	Monika Dryl	Michał Kwiatkowski
5) Spring 2016	March 12 – May 14, 2016	8	10	Aleksandra Szwed	Dariusz Kordek	Jerzy Grzechnik	Katarzyna Pakosińska
6) Fall 2016	September 3 – November 19, 2016	8	10	* Maria Tyszkiewicz	Olga Szomańska	Kamil Bijoś	Michał Rudaś
7) Spring 2017	March 4 – May 6, 2017	8	10	Kasia Popowska	Joanna Jabłczyńska	Sławomir Zapała	Zofia Nowakowska
8) Fall 2017	September 9 – November 11, 2017	8	10	Kacper Kuszewski	Krzysztof Antkowiak	Anna Dereszowska	Beata Olga Kowalska
9) Spring 2018	March 3 – May 19, 2018	8	10	Filip Lato	Jan Traczyk	Anna Guzik	Krzysztof Szczepaniak
10) Fall 2018	September 8 – November 17, 2018	8	10	Mateusz Ziółko	Rafał Szatan	Marek Molak	Adriana Kalska
11) Spring 2019	February 23 – May 18, 2019	8	12	Kazimierz Mazur	Katarzyna Dąbrowska	Elżbieta Romanowska	Antek Smykiewicz
12) Fall 2019	September 7 – November 23, 2019	8	12	Adam Strycharczuk	Emilia Komarnicka-Klynstra	Ewelina Lisowska	Łukasz Zagrobelny
13) 2020	March 7 – November 7, 2020	8	12	Paweł Czadoman Dudek	Filip Gurłacz	Gosia Andrzejewicz	Marta Gałuszewska
14) Spring 2021	March 5 – May 14, 2021	8	10	Lesław Żurek	Paweł Góral	Michał Meyer	Maja Hyży
15) Fall 2021	September 10 – November 12, 2021	8	10	‡ Robert Janowski	Barbara Kurdej-Szatan	Adam Zdrójkowski	Katarzyna Łaska
16) Spring 2022	March 4 – May 13, 2022	8	10	Johan Danzel Waem	Andrzej Kozłowski	Anna Rusowicz	Wiktoria Viki Gabor
17) Fall 2022	September 2 – November 4, 2022	8	10	Kasia Wilk	Katarzyna Polewany	Janusz Radek	Katarzyna Ucherska
18) Spring 2023	March 3 – May 12, 2023	8	10	Oskar Cyms	Daria Marcinkowska	Julia Kamińska	Natalia Janoszek
19) Fall 2023	September 1 – November 3, 2023	8	10	* Kuba Szmajkowski	Nick Sinckler	Marcin Januszkiewicz	Ewelina Flinta
20) Spring 2024	March 8 – May 17, 2024	8	10	Filip Lato	Stefano Terrazzino	Mateusz Ziółko	Maria Tyszkiewicz
21) Fall 2024	September 6 – November 8, 2024	8	10	Kuba Szyperski	Patricia Kazadi	Aleksander Sikora	Barbara Wypych
22) Fall 2025	September 5 – November 7, 2025	8	10	Natalia Muianga	Kamil Studnicki	Modest Ruciński	Krystian Ochman
23) Fall 2026	September 4 – November 6, 2026	8	10	‡ Maria Sadowska	Rafał Brzozowski	Ula Milewska	Marcin Maciejczak
24) Fall 2027	September 2027	8	10				

* Youngest male winner at age 21; youngest female winner at age 25
‡ Oldest male winner at age 60; oldest female winner at age 50

== Season 1 (2014) ==
The first season premiered on 8 March 2014 – 26 April 2014. Piotr Gąsowski and Maciej Dowbor were the hosts. The judges were Paweł Królikowski, Katarzyna Kwiatkowska, DJ Adamus and Małgorzata Walewska.

=== Contestants ===
Celebrity	Known for	Episodes won	Episodes lost	Result
Katarzyna Skrzynecka	Actress, singer and television presenter	2nd, Final	6th	Winner
Agnieszka Wlodarczyk	Actress and singer	7th	-	2nd place
Mariusz Totoszko	Singer and Idol finalist	3rd	2nd	3rd place
Artur Chamski	Actor and singer	5th	-	4th place
Paweł Tucholski	Actor	-	-	5th place
Paulina Paulla Ignasiak	Singer	6th	1st, 4th	6th place
Julia Pietrucha	Actress	1st	4th, 5th, 6th	6th place
Bilguun Ariunbaatar	Comedian and television presenter	4th	3rd, 7th	8th place

== Season 2 (2014) ==
The second season premiered on 6 September 2014 – 22 November 2014. Piotr Gąsowski and Maciej Dowbor returned as the hosts. The judges were Paweł Królikowski, DJ Adamus and Małgorzata Walewska. Katarzyna Kwiatkowska was replaced by Katarzyna Skrzynecka as new judge. The previous edition was won by Katarzyna Skrzynecka and opened the new edition.

=== Contestants ===
Celebrity	Known for	Episodes won	Episodes lost	Result
Marek Kaliszuk	Actor	5th, Final	-	Winner
Marcin Przybylski	Actor and theater director	6th	1st	2nd place
Joanna Liszowska	Actress	1st, 7th	-	3rd place
Barbara Melzer	Actress and singer	-	-	4th place
Jacek Kawalec	Actor	8th	3rd, 7th	5th place
Magda Steczkowska	Singer	3rd	6th, 8th	6th place
Jakub Molęda	Singer	4th	2nd, 5th	7th place
Maja Bohosiewicz	Actress	2nd	4th	8th place

== Season 3 (2015) ==
The third season premiered on 7 March 2015 – 9 May 2015. Piotr Gąsowski and Maciej Dowbor returned as the hosts. The judges were Paweł Królikowski, DJ Adamus, Małgorzata Walewska and Katarzyna Skrzynecka. The previous edition was won by Marek Kaliszuk and opened the new edition.

=== Contestants ===
Celebrity	Known for	Episodes won	Episodes lost	Result
Stefano Terrazzino	Dancer and singer	5th, 6th, Final	7th	Winner
Robert Rozmus	Actor and singer	1st, 9th	3rd	2nd place
Grzegorz Wilk	Singer	4th	3rd	3rd place
Kaja Paschalska	Actress and singer	8th	1st	4th place
Mateusz Jakubiec	Actor	7th	6th	5th place
Kasia Cerekwicka	Singer	2nd	8th	6th place
Anna Czartoryska-Niemczycka	Actress and singer	-	4th	7th place
Katarzyna Ankudowicz	Actress	3rd	2nd, 5th, 9th	8th place

== Season 4 (2015) ==
The fourth season premiered on 5 September 2015 – 7 November 2015. Piotr Gąsowski and Maciej Dowbor returned as the hosts. The judges were Paweł Królikowski, DJ Adamus, Małgorzata Walewska and Katarzyna Skrzynecka. The previous edition was won by Stefano Terrazzino and opened the new edition.

=== Contestants ===
Celebrity	Known for	Episodes won	Episodes lost	Result
Bartłomiej Kasprzykowski	Actor	3rd, 9th, Final	2nd	Winner
Zofia Zborowska	Actress	4th	1st, 6th	2nd place
Monika Dryl	Actress	2nd	-	3rd place
Michał Kwiatkowski	Singer and Star Academy runner-up	8th	3rd, 6th, 9th	4th place
Katarzyna Glinka	Actress	7th	4th, 9th	5th place
Michał Grobelny	Singer and The Voice of Poland contestant	1st, 6th	7th	5th place
Natalia Szroeder	Singer	5th	8th	7th place
Krzysztof Respondek	Actor and comedian	-	5th	8th place

== Season 5 (2016) ==
The fifth season premiered on 12 March 2016 – 14 May 2016. Piotr Gąsowski and Maciej Dowbor returned as the hosts. The judges were Paweł Królikowski, Małgorzata Walewska and Katarzyna Skrzynecka. DJ Adamus was replaced by Bartłomiej Kasprzykowski as new judge. The previous edition was won by Bartłomiej Kasprzykowski and opened the new edition.

=== Contestants ===
Celebrity	Known for	Episodes won	Episodes lost	Result
Aleksandra Szwed	Actress and television presenter	Final	4th, 5th	Winner
Dariusz Kordek	Actor	2nd	1st	2nd place
Jerzy Grzechnik	Actor, singer and The Voice of Poland contestant	1st, 8th, 9th	6th	3rd place
Katarzyna Pakosińska	Actress and comedian	3rd	-	4th place
Agnieszka Twardowska	Singer and The Voice of Poland contestant	5th	3rd	5th place
Adam Fidusiewicz	Actor	7th	-	6th place
Katarzyna Zielińska	Actress	6th	7th	7th place
Marcin Rogacewicz	Actor	4th	2nd, 3rd, 8th, 9th	8th place

== Season 6 (2016) ==
The sixth season premiered on 3 September 2016 – 19 November 2016. Piotr Gąsowski and Maciej Dowbor returned as the hosts. Paweł Królikowski, Małgorzata Walewska, Katarzyna Skrzynecka and Bartłomiej Kasprzykowski. The previous edition was won by Aleksandra Szwed and opened the new edition.

=== Contestants ===
Celebrity	Known for	Episodes won	Episodes lost	Result
Maria Tyszkiewicz	Singer and actress	2nd, 9th, Final	5th, 7th	Winner
Olga Szomańska	Singer and actress	1st, 7th	9th	2nd place
Kamil Bijoś	Singer and The Voice of Poland semi-finalist	3rd	-	3rd place
Michał Rudaś	Singer and The Voice of Poland contestant	6th	4th	4th place
Joanna Moro	Actress	8th	1st	5th place
Radosław Pazura	Actor	5th	2nd	6th place
Olga Borys	Actress	-	3rd, 8th, 9th	7th place
Mateusz Banasiuk	Actor	4th	1st, 6th, 8th	8th place

== Season 7 (2017) ==
The seventh season premiered on 4 March 2017 – 6 May 2017. Piotr Gąsowski and Maciej Dowbor returned as the hosts. Paweł Królikowski, Małgorzata Walewska, Katarzyna Skrzynecka and Bartłomiej Kasprzykowski. The previous edition was won by Maria Tyszkiewicz and opened the new edition.

=== Contestants ===
Celebrity	Known for	Episodes won	Episodes lost	Result
Kasia Popowska	Singer and Mam talent! contestant	5th, Final	-	Winner
Joanna Jabłczyńska	Actress	2nd, 4th, 7th	3rd, 6th, 8th	2nd place
Sławomir Zapała	Actor and singer	3rd, 9th	4th, 5th	3rd place
Zofia Nowakowska	Singer and actress	1st	-	4th place
Paweł Jasionowski	Disco polo singer	6th	1st, 5th, 7th	5th place
Krzysztof Kwiatkowski	Actor	-	-	6th place
Monika Borzym	Singer	8th	2nd, 9th	7th place
Jakub Świderski	Actor	-	7th	8th place

== Season 8 (2017) ==
The eighth season will premiere on 9 September 2017 – 11 November 2017. Piotr Gąsowski and Maciej Dowbor will return as the hosts. Paweł Królikowski, Małgorzata Walewska, Katarzyna Skrzynecka and Bartłomiej Kasprzykowski. The previous edition was won by Kasia Popowska and opened the new edition.

=== Contestants ===
Celebrity	Known for	Episodes won	Episodes lost	Result
Kacper Kuszewski	Actor and singer	9th, Final	-	Winner
Krzysztof Antkowiak	Singer	1st, 6th	5th	2nd place
Anna Dereszowska	Actress and singer	4th, 5th	3rd	3rd place
Beata Olga Kowalska	Actress	8th	6th, 9th	4th place
Kasia Moś	Singer, Eurovision and Must Be The Music finalist	7th	8th	5th place
Mariusz Ostrowski	Actor	3rd	1st, 2nd, 4th	6th place
Marcel Sabat	Actor	2nd	-	7th place
Aleksandra Gintrowska	Singer, actress and Eurovision national selections finalist	-	7th	8th place

== Season 9 (2018) ==
The ninth season premiered on 3 March 2018 – 19 May 2018. Piotr Gąsowski and Maciej Dowbor returned as the hosts. Paweł Królikowski, Małgorzata Walewska and Katarzyna Skrzynecka. Bartłomiej Kasprzykowski was replaced by Kacper Kuszewski as new judge. The previous edition was won by Kacper Kuszewski and opened the new edition. Joanna Liszowska appeared as a guest judge, replacing Małgorzata Walewska in the fifth episode.

=== Contestants ===
Celebrity	Known for	Episodes won	Episodes lost	Result
Filip Lato	Singer and The Voice of Poland contestant	7th, 9th, Final	2nd, 6th	Winner
Jan Traczyk	Actor, singer and The Voice of Poland contestant	-	-	2nd place
Anna Guzik	Actress	6th	3rd	3rd place
Krzysztof Szczepaniak	Actor	1st, 3rd	6th	4th place
Joanna Ruda Lazer	Singer and Must Be the Music semifinalist	5th, 8th	-	5th place
Natalia Krakowiak	Actress, singer and The Voice of Poland contestant	2nd	9th	6th place
Izabella Miko	Actress, dancer and model	4th	7th	7th place
Andrzej Młynarczyk	Actor	-	1st, 4th, 5th, 8th	8th place

== Season 10 (2018) ==
The tenth season premiered on 8 September 2018 – 17 November 2018. Piotr Gąsowski and Maciej Dowbor returned as the hosts. Paweł Królikowski, Małgorzata Walewska, Katarzyna Skrzynecka and Kacper Kuszewski. The previous edition was won by Filip Lato and opened the new edition. Stefano Terrazzino appeared as a guest judge, replacing Małgorzata Walewska in the eighth episode.

=== Contestants ===
Celebrity	Known for	Episodes won	Episodes lost	Result
Mateusz Ziółko	Singer, Mam talent! finalist and The Voice of Poland winner	4th, 6th, 7th, Final	-	Winner
Rafał Szatan	Actor, singer and The Voice of Poland contestant	2nd, 8th	-	2nd place
Marek Molak	Actor, singer and The Voice of Poland contestant	3rd	4th, 5th	3rd place
Adriana Kalska	Actress	1st, 5th	2nd, 6th	4th place
Honorata Skarbek	Singer	-	5th	5th place
Bogumił Boogie Romanowski	Disco polo singer	9th	1st	6th place
Michalina Sosna	Actress	-	-	7th place
Katarzyna Maciąg	Actress	-	3rd, 7th, 8th, 9th	8th place

== Season 11 (2019) ==
The eleventh season premiered on 23 February 2019 – 18 May 2019. Piotr Gąsowski and Maciej Dowbor returned as the hosts. Paweł Królikowski, Małgorzata Walewska, Katarzyna Skrzynecka and Kacper Kuszewski. The previous edition was won by Mateusz Ziółko and opened the new edition. Piotr Polk appeared as a guest judge, replacing Małgorzata Walewska in the tenth episode. Paweł Królikowski could not appear in the final as a juror because of illness.

=== Contestants ===
Celebrity	Known for	Episodes won	Episodes lost	Result
Kazimierz Mazur	Actor	7th, Final	3rd, 6th	Winner
Katarzyna Dąbrowska	Actress and singer	1st, 9th	-	2nd place
Elżbieta Romanowska	Actress	3rd, 10th	1st	3rd place
Antek Smykiewicz	Singer and The Voice of Poland finalist	5th	4th	4th place
Marta Wiejak	Actress	2nd	3rd, 8th	5th place
Stanisław Karpiel-Bułecka	Singer, Must Be the Music contestant and skier	8th, 11th	2nd, 10th	6th place
Iga Krefft	Actress and singer	6th	11th	7th place
Kamil Pawelski	Fashion blogger and singer	4th	1st, 5th, 7th, 9th	8th place

== Season 12 (2019) ==
The twelfth season premiered on 7 September 2019 – 23 November 2019. Piotr Gąsowski and Maciej Dowbor returned as the hosts. Paweł Królikowski, Małgorzata Walewska, Katarzyna Skrzynecka and Kacper Kuszewski. The previous edition was won by Kazimierz Mazur and opened the new edition. Kazimierz Mazur appeared as a guest judge, replacing Kacper Kuszewski in the eleventh episode.

=== Contestants ===
Celebrity	Known for	Episodes won	Episodes lost	Result
Adam Strycharczuk	YouTuber and singer	8th, 10th, Final	5th	Winner
Emilia Komarnicka-Klynstra	Actress and singer	7th	10th	2nd Place
Ewelina Lisowska	Singer and X Factor semifinalist	9th, 11th	-	3rd Place
Łukasz Zagrobelny	Singer and Eurovision national selections finalist	4th, 5th	7th	4th Place
Ewelina Ruckgaber	Actress and television presenter	3rd	11th	5th Place
Jeremi Sikorski	Singer and actor	6th	2nd, 4th, 8th	5th Place
Katarzyna Ptasińska	Actress	2nd	1st, 3rd, 9th	7th Place
Robert Koszucki	Actor and television presenter	1st	6th	8th Place

== Season 13 (2020) ==
The thirteenth season premiered on 7 March 2020 – 14 March 2020 to 5 September 2020 – 7 November 2020 due to the COVID-19 pandemic. Piotr Gąsowski and Maciej Dowbor returned as the hosts. The judges were Małgorzata Walewska, Katarzyna Skrzynecka and Kacper Kuszewski. Paweł Królikowski, due to his death on 27 February 2020, was replaced by Adam Strycharczuk as a new judge. The previous edition was won by Adam Strycharczuk and opened the new edition.

=== Contestants ===
Celebrity	Known for	Episodes won	Episodes lost	Result
Paweł Czadoman Dudek	Disco polo singer	4th, Final	6th	Winner
Filip Gurłacz	Actor	2nd	-	2nd Place
Gosia Andrzejewicz	Singer	3rd, 11th	-	3rd Place
Marta Gałuszewska	Singer and The Voice of Poland winner	7th, 9th	8th	4th Place
Karol Dziuba	Actor	5th	4th, 11th	5th place
Natalia Avelon	Actress, singer and model	8th	1st, 10th	6th place
Kamila Boruta	Actress	6th, 10th	9th	7th place
Maurycy Popiel	Actor	1st	2nd, 3rd, 5th, 7th	8th place

== Season 14 (2021) ==
The fourteenth season premiered on 5 March 2021 – 14 May 2021. Piotr Gąsowski and Maciej Dowbor returned as the hosts. The judges were Małgorzata Walewska, Katarzyna Skrzynecka, Kacper Kuszewski and Adam Strycharczuk. The previous edition was won by Paweł Czadoman Dudek and opened the new edition. Due to the COVID-19 epidemic, the edition was carried out without the participation of the public, except for the final episode.

=== Contestants ===
Celebrity	Known for	Episodes won	Episodes lost	Result
Lesław Żurek	Actor	3rd, 9th, Final	-	Winner
Paweł Góral	Actor	1st	-	2nd Place
Michał Meyer	Actor	2nd	3rd	3rd Place
Maja Hyży	Singer and X Factor semifinalist	6th	2nd, 9th	4th Place
Tamara Arciuch	Actress	8th	9th	5th place
Magdalena Narożna	Disco polo singer and Must Be the Music finalist	7th	1st, 4th	6th place
Anna-Maria Sieklucka	Actress and singer	4th	2nd, 5th, 7th	7th place
Piotr Gawron-Jedlikowski	Actor	5th	6th, 8th	8th place

== Season 15 (2021) ==
The fifteenth season premiered on 10 September 2021 – 12 November 2021. Piotr Gąsowski and Maciej Dowbor returned as the hosts. The judges are Małgorzata Walewska and Katarzyna Skrzynecka. Kacper Kuszewski and Adam Strycharczuk was replaced by Michał Wiśniewski and Gromee as new judges. The previous edition was won by Lesław Żurek and opened the new edition. Sławomir Zapała appeared as a guest judge, replacing Małgorzata Walewska in the fourth episode. Stefano Terrazzino appeared as a guest judge, replacing Katarzyna Skrzynecka in the fifth episode.

=== Contestants ===
Celebrity	Known for	Episodes won	Episodes lost	Result
Robert Janowski	Singer, actor and television presenter	1st, Final	-	Winner
Barbara Kurdej-Szatan	Actress and singer	9th	-	2nd Place
Adam Zdrójkowski	Actor	7th	-	3rd Place
Katarzyna Łaska	Singer and actress	4th	3rd	4th Place
Paulina Sykut-Jeżyna	Journalist, television presenter and Idol contestant	2nd	-	5th place
Krzysztof Chris Cugowski	Actor and singer	3rd, 5th	1st, 2nd, 4th, 6th	6th place
Tomasz Ciachorowski	Actor	8th	5th, 7th	7th place
Klara Williams	Actress	6th	2nd, 8th, 9th	8th place

== Season 16 (2022) ==
The sixteenth season premiered on 4 March 2022 – 13 May 2022. Piotr Gąsowski and Maciej Dowbor returned as the hosts. The judges are Małgorzata Walewska, Katarzyna Skrzynecka and Michał Wiśniewski. Gromee was replaced by Krzysztof Cugowski as new judge. The previous edition was won by Robert Janowski and opened the new edition. Krzysztof Cugowski in the 2nd and 3rd episodes of the 16th edition, he did not appear in the studio of the program due to being in quarantine, which caused him to connect remotely. Robert Janowski appeared as a guest judge, replacing Michał Wiśniewski in the fourth episode. Due to the COVID-19 epidemic, audiences were wearing masks for five episodes, but audiences were maskless for the remainder of the episodes.

=== Contestants ===
Celebrity	Known for	Episodes won	Episodes lost	Result
Johan Danzel Waem	Singer	4th, Final	-	Winner
Andrzej Kozłowski	Actor and comedian	8th	-	2nd Place
Ania Rusowicz	Singer	3rd, 9th	5th, 7th	3rd Place
Wiktoria Viki Gabor	Singer, The Voice Kids finalist and Junior Eurovision winner	2nd	-	4th Place
Anna Jurksztowicz	Singer	5th	-	5th place
Patryk Cebulski	Actor	1st	-	6th place
Maciej Radel	Actor	6th	5th	7th place
Karolina Pisarek	Model and Top Model finalist	7th	1st, 2nd, 3rd, 4th, 6th, 8th, 9th	8th place

== Season 17 (2022) ==
The seventeenth season premiered on 2 September 2022 – 4 November 2022. Piotr Gąsowski and Maciej Dowbor returned as the hosts. The judges are Małgorzata Walewska, Katarzyna Skrzynecka and Michał Wiśniewski. Krzysztof Cugowski was replaced by Robert Janowski as new judge. The previous edition was won by Johan Danzel Waem and opened the new edition. Lesław Żurek appeared as a guest judge, replacing Michał Wiśniewski in the fourth episode.

=== Contestants ===
Celebrity	Known for	Episodes won	Episodes lost	Result
Kasia Wilk	Singer	1st, Final	-	Winner
Katarzyna Polewany	Actress	5th, 9th	-	2nd Place
Janusz Radek	Singer, actor and Eurovision national selections finalist	2nd, 8th	5th	3rd Place
Katarzyna Ucherska	Actress	6th	1st, 4th	4th Place
Robert Szpręgiel	Opera singer	3rd	6th	5th place
Ewa Błachnio	Comedian	-	-	6th place
Michał Milowicz	Actor, singer and director	7th	3rd, 8th	7th place
Jakub Zdrójkowski	Actor	4th	2nd, 7th, 9th	8th place

== Season 18 (2023) ==
The eighteenth season premiered on 3 March 2023 – 12 May 2023. Maciej Dowbor returned as the host. Piotr Gąsowski was replaced by Maciej Rock as the host. Małgorzata Walewska and Robert Janowski returned as the judges. Katarzyna Skrzynecka and Michał Wiśniewski were both replaced by Paweł Domagała as the new judge - for the first time in the show's history, the participants will be assessed by three judges. Also for the first time, one of the contestants was not a celebrity and had to win an audition; Daniel Jaroszek was later announced to be the winner of the audition as the eighth contestant. The previous edition was won by Kasia Wilk and opened the new edition. The scoring rules have also changed. Now the participants give each other 4 points. Anna Dereszowska appeared as a guest judge, replacing Małgorzata Walewska in the fourth episode.

=== Contestants ===
Celebrity	Known for	Episodes won	Episodes lost	Result
Oskar Cyms	Singer and TikTok personality	3rd, 4th, 8th, Final	1st, 7th	Winner
Daria Marcinkowska	Singer, The Voice of Poland contestant and Eurovision national selections finalist	9th	-	2nd Place
Julia Kamińska	Actress	5th, 6th	8th	3rd Place
Natalia Janoszek	Actress, film producer and singer	7th	2nd, 4th, 6th	4th Place
Daniel Jaroszek	Non-celebrity contestant chosen via open auditions	-	6th	5th place
Piotr Stramowski	Actor	-	3rd	6th place
Katarzyna Kołeczek	Actress	-	-	7th place
Krzysztof Ibisz	Journalist and television presenter	1st, 2nd	4th, 5th, 9th	8th place

== Season 19 (2023) ==
The nineteenth season premiered between 1 September – 3 November 2023. Maciej Dowbor and Maciej Rock returned as the hosts. Małgorzata Walewska, Robert Janowski and Paweł Domagała returned as the judges. Krzysztof „Kris” Adamski was replaced by Maciej Zakliczyński as the dance coach. Also for the second time, one of the contestants was not a celebrity and had to win an audition; Jagoda Szydłowska was later announced to be the winner of the audition as the eighth contestant. The previous edition was won by Oskar Cyms and opened the new edition. Joanna Liszowska appeared as a guest judge, replacing Paweł Domagała in the fifth episode.

=== Contestants ===
Celebrity	Known for	Episodes won	Episodes lost	Result
Kuba Szmajkowski	Singer, The Voice Kids and double Eurovision national selections finalist	2nd, 5th, Final	9th	Winner
Nick Sinckler	Singer and Fabryka Gwiazd finalist	3rd	-	2nd Place
Marcin Januszkiewicz	Actor and singer	4th	1st	3rd Place
Ewelina Flinta	Singer and Idol finalist	7th	4th, 6th	4th Place
Jagoda Szydłowska	Non-celebrity contestant chosen via open auditions	1st	3rd, 8th	5th place
Pola Gonciarz	Actress	6th	5th, 7th	6th place
Magdalena Kumorek	Actress and singer	9th	5th	7th place
Jakub Gąsowski	Actor and journalist	8th	2nd	8th place

== Season 20: Najlepsi! (2024) ==
The twentieth season premiered on 8 March 2024 – 17 May 2024. Maciej Dowbor and Maciej Rock returned as the hosts. Małgorzata Walewska and Robert Janowski returned as the judges. Paweł Domagała was replaced by Piotr Gąsowski as the new judge who returns to this program. Marcin Przybylski, a finalist of the second edition of this program, became a coach for acting tasks. The previous edition was won by Kuba Szmajkowski and opened the new edition. For the first time, this series will feature the finalists of previous seasons. For this reason, the title of the program received the note "The Best!". In the final episode of the edition, the winner was chosen by the viewers - by SMS voting.

=== Contestants ===
Celebrity	Known for	Original season	Episodes won	Episodes lost	Result
Filip Lato	Singer and The Voice of Poland contestant	Series IX	8th, Final	-	Winner
Stefano Terrazzino	Dancer and singer	Series III	6th	2nd, 5th, 7th	2nd Place
Mateusz Ziółko	Singer, Mam talent! finalist and The Voice of Poland winner	Series X	4th	1st	3rd Place
Maria Tyszkiewicz	Singer and actress	Series VI	5th	-	4th Place
Katarzyna Skrzynecka	Actress, singer and television presenter	Series I	1st	4th, 8th	5th place
Barbara Kurdej-Szatan	Actress and singer	Series XV	9th	-	6th place
Kacper Kuszewski	Actor and singer	Series VIII	3rd	9th	7th place
Aleksandra Szwed	Actress and television presenter	Series V	2nd, 7th	3rd, 6th, 8th	7th place

== Season 21 (2024) ==
The twenty-first season premiered on 6 September – 8 November 2024. Maciej Rock returned as the host. Maciej Dowbor was replaced by Agnieszka Hyży as the host. Małgorzata Walewska and Piotr Gąsowski returned as the judges. Robert Janowski was replaced by Stefano Terrazzino and Justyna Steczkowska as new judges. The program returns to a lineup of 4 jurors and the contestants again award each other 5 points. The previous edition was won by Filip Lato and opened the new edition.

=== Contestants ===
Celebrity	Known for	Episodes won	Episodes lost	Result
Kuba Szyperski	Actor and Must Be the Music finalist	3rd, 5th, Final	-	Winner
Patricia Kazadi	Actress, singer and television presenter	1st, 2nd	-	2nd Place
Aleksander Sikora	Journalist and television presenter	8th	-	3rd Place
Barbara Wypych	Actress	7th	4th	4th Place
Renata Reni Jusis	Singer	4th	6th, 8th, 9th	5th place
Joanna Osyda	Actress	6th	4th, 7th	6th place
Damian Kret	Actor	9th	1st, 3rd, 6th	7th place
Bartek Wrona	Singer	-	2nd, 5th	8th place

== Season 22 (2025) ==
The twenty-second season premiered on 5 September 2025 – 7 November 2025. Maciej Rock and Agnieszka Hyży returned as the hosts. Małgorzata Walewska, Piotr Gąsowski, Stefano Terrazzino and Justyna Steczkowska returned as the judges. The previous edition was won by Kuba Szyperski and opened the new edition. From the 5th episode onwards, the second-placed competitor wins PLN 5,000. Natalia Kukulska appeared as a guest judge, replacing Justyna Steczkowska in the seventh episode. Majka Jeżowska appeared as a guest judge, replacing Małgorzata Walewska in the eighth episode.

=== Contestants ===
Celebrity	Known for	Episodes won	Episodes lost	Result
Natalia Muianga	Singer, Mam talent! finalist and The Voice of Poland quarter-finalist	1st, 3rd, Final	-	Winner
Kamil Studnicki	Actor	2nd, 7th	3rd	2nd Place
Modest Ruciński	Actor	6th	9th	3rd Place
Krystian Ochman	Singer, The Voice of Poland winner and Eurovision finalist	4th	-	4th Place
Andrzej Nejman	Actor and director	8th	-	5th place
Edyta Herbuś	Dancer, actress, television presenter and Dancing Eurovision winner	-	1st, 4th, 6th, 8th	6th place
Marta Bijan	Singer and X Factor finalist	5th, 9th	7th	7th place
Julia Żugaj	Influencer and singer	-	2nd, 5th	8th place

== Season 23 (2026) ==
The twenty-three season premiered on 4 September 2026 – 6 November 2025. Maciej Rock and Agnieszka Hyży returned as the hosts. Małgorzata Walewska, Piotr Gąsowski, Stefano Terrazzino and Justyna Steczkowska returned as the judges. The previous edition was won by Natalia Muianga and opened the new edition. Starting with this season, the winner of each episode receives 15,000 PLN, and the overall winner of the season wins 150,000 PLN and, starting with this edition, the runner-up also receives 20,000 PLN after the final, which they then donate to a cause of their choosing. Tatiana Okupnik appeared as a guest judge, replacing Justyna Steczkowska in the third episode.

=== Contestants ===
Celebrity	Known for	Episodes won	Episodes lost	Result
Maria Sadowska	Singer and director	9th, Final	8th	Winner
Rafał Brzozowski	Singer, television presenter, The Voice of Poland and Eurovision semi-finalist	4th	-	2nd Place
Ula Milewska	Actress and singer	1st, 6th	2nd, 5th, 9th	3rd Place
Marcin Maciejczak	Singer and The Voice Kids winner	2nd, 8th	3rd	4th Place
Ida Nowakowska	Dancer and television presenter	3rd, 7th	8th	5th place
Gabriel Fleszar	Singer and The Voice of Poland contestant	-	1st, 6th	6th place
Marcin Miller	Disco polo singer	5th	4th, 7th	7th place
Gabriela bryska Nowak-Skyrpan	Singer	-	-	8th place

== Season 24 (2027) ==
The twenty-fourth season will premiere in September 2027. Maciej Rock and Agnieszka Hyży will return as the hosts. Małgorzata Walewska, Piotr Gąsowski, Stefano Terrazzino and Maria Sadowska will return as the judges.

== Christmas episodes ==
The first episode premiered on December 18, 2020. The contestants were four women and five men:

- Gosia Andrzejewicz, Katarzyna Dąbrowska, Ewelina Lisowska, Katarzyna Skrzynecka
- Paweł Dudek, Marek Kaliszuk, Filip Lato, Adam Strycharczuk, Stefano Terrazzino

The winners were Katarzyna Skrzynecka as Ella Fitzgerald, Gosia Andrzejewicz as Mariah Carey, Paweł Dudek as Rod Stewart and Adam Strycharczuk as Louis Armstrong.

The second episode premiered on December 17, 2021. The contestants were five women and four men:

- Gosia Andrzejewicz, Agnieszka Hekiert, Barbara Kurdej-Szatan, Joanna Liszowska, Katarzyna Skrzynecka
- Robert Janowski, Sławomir Zapała, Adam Zdrójkowski, Lesław Żurek

The winner was Agnieszka Hekiert as Rod Stewart.

== Special episodes ==
First issue date	Episode subject	Time of broadcast
November 11, 2018	The most interesting performances of the winners of the previous editions and the four finalists of the tenth edition	Sunday 15.45
February 10, 2019	The best performances in the program	Sunday 15.45
February 17, 2019	The best performances in the program	Sunday 15.45
April 12, 2020	Best Final Performances	Sunday 15.45
May 2, 2020	The best performances with Polish hits	Saturday 22.00
May 9, 2020	Best male performances in female roles	Saturday 22.00
May 16, 2020	The most moving performances	Saturday 22.00
May 23, 2020	The best dance hits	Saturday 22.00
May 30, 2020	The best performances in duets	Saturday 22.00

== Viewing figures ==
Episode	Season 1	Season 2	Season 3	Season 4	Season 5	Season 6	Season 7	Season 8	Season 9	Season 10	Season 11	Season 12	Season 13	Season 14	Season 15	Season 16	Season 17	Season 18	Season 19	Season 20	Season 21	Season 22	Season 23
1	2 804 932 (March 8, 2014)	2 350 000 (September 6, 2014)	2 898 003 (March 7, 2015)	2 160 415 (September 5, 2015)	2 370 186 (March 12, 2016)	2 012 816 (September 3, 2016)	1 945 902 (March 4, 2017)	1 423 830 (September 9, 2017)	1 846 549 (March 3, 2018)	1 288 626 (September 8, 2018)	1 501 097 (February 23, 2019)	1 264 579 (September 7, 2019)	1 449 657 (March 7, 2020)	1 816 909 (March 5, 2021)	1 661 900 (September 10, 2021)	1 457 951 (March 4, 2022)	1 250 972 (September 2, 2022)	1 503 506 (March 3, 2023)	925 293 (September 1, 2023)	1 433 280 (March 8, 2024)	(September 6, 2024)	(September 5, 2025)	(September 4, 2026)
2	2 728 234 (March 15, 2014)	2 214 927 (September 13, 2014)	2 742 968 (March 14, 2015)	2 060 038 (September 12, 2015)	2 284 325 (March 19, 2016)	1 883 449 (September 10, 2016)	2 013 568 (March 11, 2017)	1 532 485 (September 16, 2017)	1 483 200 (March 10, 2018)	1 481 858 (September 15, 2018)	1 779 769 (March 2, 2019)	1 027 206 (September 14, 2019)	1 281 425 (March 14, 2020)	1 750 957 (March 12, 2021)	1 616 239 (September 17, 2021)	1 619 388 (March 11, 2022)	1 452 757 (September 9, 2022)	1 466 715 (March 10, 2023)	954 812 (September 8, 2023)	1 345 285 (March 15, 2024)	(September 13, 2024)	(September 12, 2025)	(September 11, 2026)
3	3 004 825 (March 22, 2014)	2 274 403 (September 20, 2014)	2 317 824 (March 21, 2015)	2 188 183 (September 19, 2015)	1 672 664 (March 26, 2016)	2 116 066 (September 17, 2016)	1 794 225 (March 18, 2017)	1 927 514 (September 23, 2017)	1 742 086 (March 17, 2018)	1 247 258 (September 22, 2018)	1 806 001 (March 9, 2019)	1 003 280 (September 21, 2019)	910 653 (September 5, 2020)	1 541 31 (March 19, 2021)	1 572 324 (September 24, 2021)	1 586 581 (March 18, 2022)	1 386 978 (September 16, 2022)	1 548 107 (March 17, 2023)	1 063 461 (September 15, 2023)	1 210 964 (March 22, 2024)	(September 20, 2024)	(September 19, 2025)	(September 18, 2026)
4	2 990 224 (March 29, 2014)	2 821 668 (September 27, 2014)	2 315 194 (March 28, 2015)	2 250 384 (September 26, 2015)	(April 2, 2016)	2 595 758 (September 24, 2016)	1 856 677 (March 25, 2017)	1 719 446 (September 30, 2017)	1 707 269 (March 24, 2018)	(September 29, 2018)	1 710 085 (March 16, 2019)	1 512 174 (September 28, 2019)	874 416 (September 12, 2020)	(March 26, 2021)	1 707 375 (October 1, 2021)	1 564 920 (March 25, 2022)	1 590 449 (September 23, 2022)	1 166 519 (March 24, 2023)	1 118 209 (September 22, 2023)	1 373 989 (April 5, 2024)	(September 27, 2024)	(September 26, 2025)	(September 25, 2026)
5	3 288 930 (April 5, 2014)	2 662 937 (October 18, 2014)	2 489 717 (April 4, 2015)	1 916 274 (October 3, 2015)	2 447 592 (April 9, 2016)	2 256 778 (October 15, 2016)	1 695 433 (April 1, 2017)	1 867 754 (October 7, 2017)	1 486 183 (March 31, 2018)	(October 6, 2018)	1 534 987 (March 23, 2019)	1 545 731 (October 5, 2019)	882 342 (September 19, 2020)	(April 9, 2021)	(October 8, 2021)	1 511 290 (April 1, 2022)	1 596 953 (September 30, 2022)	1 379 993 (March 31, 2023)	1 184 710 (September 29, 2023)	1 436 831 (April 12, 2024)	(October 4, 2024)	(October 3, 2025)	(October 2, 2026)
6	3 062 660 (April 12, 2014)	2 618 963 (October 25, 2014)	2 530 271 (April 11, 2015)	2 348 162 (October 10, 2015)	2 443 597 (April 16, 2016)	2 069 577 (October 22, 2016)	1 723 804 (April 8, 2017)	1 765 867 (October 14, 2017)	(April 7, 2018)	(October 13, 2018)	1 683 660 (March 30, 2019)	1 536 034 (October 12, 2019)	900 212 (September 26, 2020)	(April 16, 2021)	(October 15, 2021)	1 528 448 (April 8, 2022)	1 450 609 (October 7, 2022)	1 477 089 (April 14, 2023)	1 277 893 (October 6, 2023)	1 438 182 (April 19, 2024)	(October 11, 2024)	(October 10, 2025)	(October 9, 2026)
7	2 853 028 (April 19, 2014)	2 521 812 (November 8, 2014)	2 743 109 (April 18, 2015)	2 437 700 (October 17, 2015)	(April 23, 2016)	2 144 422 (October 29, 2016)	1 438 578 (April 15, 2017)	1 461 091 (October 21, 2017)	1 514 728 (April 21, 2018)	1 764 480 (October 20, 2018)	1 696 531 (April 6, 2019)	1 428 606 (October 19, 2019)	941 302 (October 3, 2020)	(April 23, 2021)	1 724 418 (October 22, 2021)	1 534 449 (April 22, 2022)	1 387 283 (October 14, 2022)	1 386 236 (April 21, 2023)	1 182 462 (October 13, 2023)	1 359 637 (April 26, 2024)	(October 18, 2024)	(October 17, 2025)	(October 16, 2026)
8	3 277 717 (April 26, 2014)	2 497 632 (November 8, 2014)	2 418 910 (April 25, 2015)	2 485 141 (October 24, 2015)	(April 30, 2016)	(November 5, 2016)	2 037 206 (April 22, 2017)	1 905 781 (October 28, 2017)	(April 28, 2018)	1 933 296 (October 27, 2018)	1 691 923 (April 13, 2019)	1 378 177 (October 26, 2019)	1 003 499 (October 10, 2020)	(April 30, 2021)	1 722 848 (October 29, 2021)	1 308 690 (April 29, 2022)	1 468 083 (October 21, 2022)	1 270 004 (April 28, 2023)	1 133 178 (October 20, 2023)	1 179 621 (May 3, 2024)	(October 25, 2024)	(October 24, 2025)	(October 23, 2026)
9	–	2 667 958 (November 22, 2014)	2 163 015 (May 2, 2015)	2 365 196 (October 31, 2015)	2 330 224 (May 7, 2016)	(November 12, 2016)	1 966 961 (April 29, 2017)	1 646 446 (November 4, 2017)	(May 5, 2018)	1 931 077 (November 3, 2018)	1 238 458 (April 20, 2019)	1 453 095 (November 2, 2019)	1 019 816 (October 17, 2020)	1 749 490 (May 7, 2021)	1 756 674 (November 5, 2021)	1 564 830 (May 6, 2022)	1 465 485 (October 28, 2022)	1 446 600 (May 5, 2023)	1 260 672 (October 27, 2023)	1 208 881 (May 10, 2024)	(November 1, 2024)	(October 31, 2025)	(October 30, 2026)
10	–	–	2 348 153 (May 9, 2015)	2 367 789 (November 7, 2015)	(May 14, 2016)	(November 19, 2016)	2 110 386 (May 6, 2017)	1 889 534 (November 11, 2017)	1 448 274 (May 19, 2017)	(November 17, 2018)	1 488 454 (May 4, 2019)	1 490 365 (November 9, 2019)	(October 24, 2020)	(May 14, 2021)	1 868 440 (November 12, 2021)	1 449 915 (May 13, 2022)	1 700 412 (November 4, 2022)	1 514 598 (May 12, 2023)	1 351 228 (November 3, 2023)	1 236 041 (May 17, 2024)	(November 8, 2024)	(November 7, 2025)	(November 6, 2026)
11	–	–	–	–	–	–	–	–	–	–	1 544 830 (May 11, 2019)	1 547 023 (November 16, 2019)	(October 31, 2020)	–	–	–	–	–	–	–	–	–	–
12	–	–	–	–	–	–	–	–	–	–	1 442 850 (May 18, 2019)	1 695 468 (November 23, 2019)	1 284 833 (November 7, 2020)	–	–	–	–	–	–	–	–	–	–
Average viewing	3 001 319	2 514 394	2 483 957	2 250 862	2 064 075	2 118 144	1 858 628	1 713 856	1 528 939	1 618 551	1 592 795	1 407 015	962 551	1 647 594	1 674 568	1 511 092	1 475 397	1 417 401	1 145 114	1 322 250	1 214 230	1 214 230	
