= Barbara Kurdej-Szatan =

Polish actress and singer (born 1985)

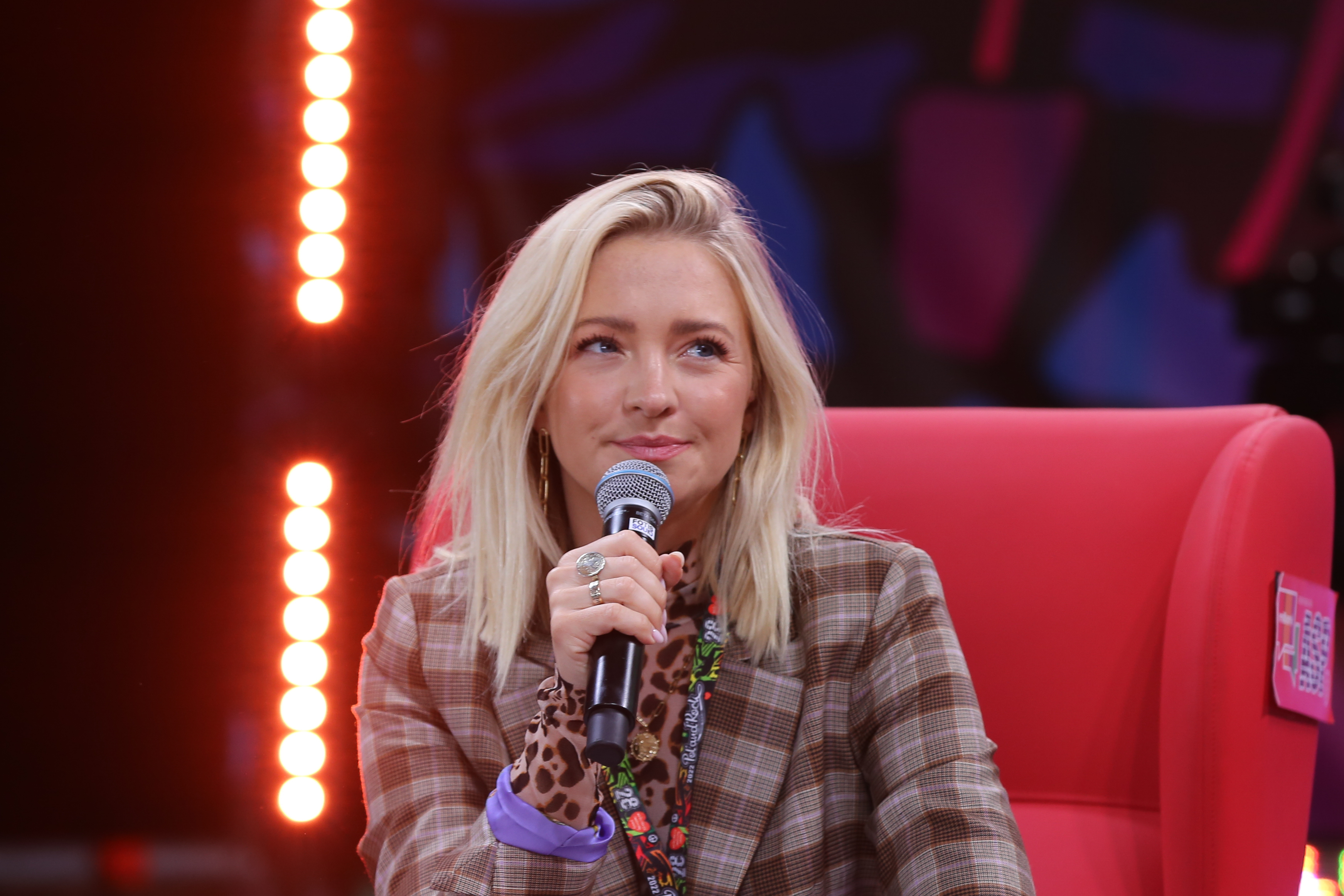
- Kurdej-Szatan in 2022
- Born: Barbara Dominika Kurdej; 22 August 1985 (age 41); Opole, Poland
- Education: National Academy of Theatre Arts
- Occupations: Actress; Television presenter; Singer
- Spouse: Rafał Szatan (m. 2011)
- Children: 2

Barbara Dominika Kurdej-Szatan (Note: Polish pronunciation: [barˈba.ra dɔ.miˈɲi.ka ˈkur.dɛj ˈʂa.tan]) (born 22 August 1985) is a Polish actress, singer, and television presenter. She starred as Basia Mazurek in the 2014 romantic comedy film Dzień dobry, kocham cię!, Jadźka Zarówna in the 2015 comedy film Wkręceni 2, and Andżela in the 2017 comedy drama film 7 Things That You Don't Know About Men, Samanta in the 2025 Christmas romantic comedy film Gingerbread Heart. Kurdej-Szatan also portrayed main characters on the TVP2 drama television series L for Love (2014–2021) as Joanna Chodakowska, the Polsat crime drama television series W rytmie serca (2017–2020) as Maria Biernacka-Żmuda, the Polsat Box Go comedy series Domek na szczęście (2022) as Marianna Bondarek, and in the TVP1 drama series Zaraz wracam (2025–2026) as Ewa Franaszek. She achieved a nation-wide recognizability though her appearances in series of commercials of the cellular network company Play, aired from 2013 to 2022, where she portrayed a store salesperson. She is also a stage and voice actress, and a singer. Kurdej-Szatan also co-hosted the TVP2 game show Kocham cię, Polsko! (2016–2018), TVP2 talent show The Voice of Poland (2016–2018), TVP2 talent show The Voice Kids (2018–2019), and the TVP2 talent show Dance Dance Dance (2019), TTV game show Project Cupid (2022). She also hosted the Zoom TV talk show Poranny rogal (2022), and the TVP2 game show Cudowne lata (2024–2025).

== Early life, education, and musical background ==
Barbara Kurdej-Szatan was born on 22 August 1985 in Opole, Poland, to Janusz Kurdej and Eliza Wyszomirska-Kurdej. She is a sister of actress Katarzyna Kurdej. Her maternal grandfather was writer and poet Bogumił Wyszomirski.

As a child, Kurdej-Szatan sang for seven years in the choir Cantores Opolienses "Legenda", with which she performed in the numerous national and international contests. She also attended Andrzej Głowacki's acting classes, as well as musical school for two years, where she played violin. Later, she performed in Opelskie Studio Piosenki (Opole Song Studio) and in the Opole Gospel Choir, with which she participated in concerts such as the Opole National Festival of Polish Song. In 2009, she graduated with a degree in acting from the National Academy of Theatre Arts in Kraków, Poland. While studying, she sang in the music group Marsels.

== Career ==
From 2008 to 2010, Kurdej-Szatan performed in the New Theatre in Poznań. Since 2010, she performs in the 6th Floor Theatre, and since 2012, in the Roma Musical Theatre, both located in Warsaw. Additionally she appeared in television series such as Plebania (2006), Two Sides of the Coin (2006), Na dobre i na złe (2011), The Clan (2011), Barwy szczęścia (2012–2013), and First Love (2014), as well as in feature films Enen (2009) and Ciacho (2010). In 2012, Kurdej-Szatan competed together with the band Soul City in the TVN talent show X Factor. Since 2015, she performs in the Kraków Variété Theatre.

Kurdej-Szatan achieved a nation-wide recognizability though her appearances in series of commercials of the cellular network company Play, aired from 2013 to 2022. She portrayed a store salesperson together with Maciej Łagodziński.

Kurdej-Szatan starred as Basia Mazurek in the 2014 romantic comedy film Dzień dobry, kocham cię!, for which she also recorded a theme song together with Liber. From 2014 to 2021, Kurdej-Szatan also played Joanna Chodakowska, one of main characters on the TVP2 drama television series L for Love. In 2014, she also begun working with Polish Television, for which she hosted or co-hosted shows such as Kocham cię, Polsko! (2016–2018), The Voice of Poland (2016–2018), The Voice Kids (2018–2019), and Dance Dance Dance (2019). Additionally, in 2014, Kurdej-Szatan co-hosted the Opole National Festival of Polish Song and the concert Sabat Czarownic in Kielce. In 2019, she stopped working with the Polish Television, which was unofficially speculated to be related to her participation in anti-government protests and her endorsement of Rafał Trzaskowski, an opposition candidate in the 2020 presidential election.

Kurdej-Szatan portrayed Jadźka Zarówna in the 2015 comedy film Wkręceni 2, and Andżela in the 2017 comedy drama film 7 Things That You Don't Know About Men. Between 2017 and 2020, she starred as Maria Biernacka-Żmuda in the Polsat crime drama television series W rytmie serca, and in 2018, she portrayed secondary characters of Weronik and Kasia in the romantic comedy films Being Unlucky Is Not a Sin and Narzeczony na niby, respectively. Additionally, she and her husband, Rafał Szatan, appeared on the Polsat talk show The Story of My Life. Historia naszego życia, and in 2019, she was a contestant in the talent show Dancing with the Stars. Taniec z gwiazdami, and co-hosted the concert Przebojowe Opole. Jedziemy na wakacje, which aired on Polsat. During the COVID-19 pandemic, Kurdej-Szatan took part in a series of online concerts streamed on Instagram, as well as an online campaign focused on reading fairy tales to children. She also formed the band MaKuSza with her family, including her husband and her sister. In 2021 and 2024, Kurdej-Szatan participated in the Polsat talent show Twoja twarz brzmi znajomo.

On 4 November 2021, during the border crisis at the Belarus–Poland border, Kurdej-Szatan posted a recording of officers, most likely of the Polish Border Guard, wrestling with mothers holding children in their arms. Kurdej-Szatan left an emotion-fueled comment, including vulgar language, criticising the officers. Her comments, such as calling the officers "machines without hearts and brains" and "murderers", stirred controversy. On 6 November 2021, she posted an apology for her "vulgar and inappropriate language" used in her statements. On 9 November 2021, Jacek Kurski, the chairperson of the Polish Television, informed the public of her firing from the network. The public prosecutor's office began an investigation, charging her with insulting officers of the Border Guard in May 2022. In December 2022, the regional court in Pruszków dismissed the case due to the lack of elements for a criminal offence. Following this, the public prosecutor's office filed a complaint regarding the court proceedings, and in February 2023, the district court in Warsaw dismissed the case.

In 2022, Kurdej-Szatan participated in a Polsat talent show Mask Singer, co-hosted the TTV game show Project Cupid, and hosted the Zoom TV talk show Poranny rogal. She also took part in an advertising campaign for the online newspaper Wyborcza.pl, and portrayed Marianna Bondarek, one of the main characters in the Polsat television series Domek na szczęście.

In March 2022, Kurdej-Szatan founded the charity foundation Z Porywu Serca, aimed at helping refugees of the Russo–Ukrainian war, and those crossing the Poland–Belarus border. In 2023, Kurdej-Szatan portrayed Marianna Bondarek, one of the main characters in the Polsat Box Go comedy series Domek na szczęście, and starred in two romantic comedy films, Miłość ma cztery łapy and Tips for Cheating 2, portraying characters of Jowita and Gosia, respectively. In 2024, Kurdej-Szatan co-hosted a TVP2 game show Cudowne lata. On 26 October 2024, she co-hosted a TVP1 charity concert for the victims of the Central European floods. In 2024 and 2025, she was a contestant in TVP1 game show Jaka to melodia?, and later appeared as a guess singer in 2025. Kurdej-Szatan was also a contestant in the Amazon Prime Video game show LOL: Kto się śmieje ostatni in 2025. She starred as Samanta in the 2025 Christmas romantic comedy film Gingerbread Heart, and as Ewa Franaszek in the TVP1 drama series Zaraz wracam. She also appeared in the 2026 comedy drama film Baśka, and in the television series Wmiksowani.pl (2026), Mały Grand Hotel (2019), Mecenas Porada (2022), Komisarz Alex (2025), and St. Anne's Hospital (2026).

Kurdej-Szatan is also a voice actress, having performed in the Polish-language dubbing versions of films. She voiced Thistlewit in Maleficent (2014) and Maleficent: Mistress of Evil (2019), Dawn Bellwether in Zootopia (2016) and Zootopia 2 (2025), Captain Celaeno in My Little Pony: The Movie (2017), Lola Bunny in Space Jam: A New Legacy (2021), and Gloria in Barbie (2023). She also acted in the radio dramas such as Lalka (2020), Siekierki, czyli dzialkowy przewrót palacowy (2022), and Biosfera (2026).

== Personal life ==
In 2011, she married actor and singer Rafał Szatan. Together they have two children, Hanna (born 2012), and Henryk (born 2020). Kurdej-Szatan resides in Warsaw, Poland.

== Filmography ==
=== Films ===
Year	Title	Role	Notes	Ref.
2006	Iskra	No data	Short film	
2009	Enen	Iwona	Feature film	
2010	Ciacho	Receptionist	Feature film	
2014	Dzień dobry, kocham cię!	Basia Mazurek	Feature film	
2015	Wkręceni 2	Jadźka Zarówna	Feature film	
2017	7 Things That You Don't Know About Men	Andżela	Feature film	
2018	Narzeczony na niby	Kasia	Feature film	
2018	Unlucky Is Not a Sin	Weronika	Feature film	
2020	Swingers	Sylwia	Feature film	
2022	Love on the Front Page	Herself	Feature film	
2023	Miłość ma cztery łapy	Jowita	Feature film	
2023	Tips for Cheating 2	Gosia	Feature film	
2025	Gingerbread Heart	Samanta	Feature film	
2026	Baśka	Natasza	Feature film	

=== Television series ===
Year	Title	Role	Notes	Ref.
2006	Plebania	Iwona	2 episodes	
2006	Two Sides of the Coin	Nurse	Episode no. 14	
2007	I kto tu rządzi?	Natasza	Episode: "Czerwony smok" (no. 12)	
2011	The Clan	Anita Sochacka	3 episodes	
2011	Na dobre i na złe	Halinka	Episode: "Śmiertelnie zakochani" (no. 451)	
2011	Usta usta	Woman in a hotel	Episode no. 33	
2012–2013	Barwy szczęścia	Hairdresser's client	2 episodes	
2014	First Love	Agnieszka Sikorska	Recurring role	
2014–2021	L for Love	Joanna Chodakowska	Main role; 62 episodes	
2016	Wielkie teorie Darwina	Herself	Webseries; episode no. 3	
2016	Wmiksowani.pl	Sabina Piorun-Drągalska	3 episodes	
2017–2020	W rytmie serca	Maria Biernacka-Żmuda	Main role; 61 episodes	
2019	Father Matthew	Sylwia Lehman	Episode: "Nieboszczyk na plebanii" (no. 273)	
2019	Mały Grand Hotel	Hotel guest	Episode no. 4	
2021	Świat pełen niespodzianek	Basia	Television special	
2022	Domek na szczęście	Marianna Bondarek	20 episodes	
2022	Mecenas Porada	Berenika Gajda	Episode: "Super szewc"	
2025	Komisarz Alex	Paulina Majewska	Episode: "Klub zołz"	
2025	#Spotted	Psychologist	Web miniseries	
2025–2026	Zaraz wracam	Ewa Franaszek	Main role; 100 episodes	
2026	St. Anne's Hospital	Ilona Soboń	Recurring role; 5 episodes	

=== Television programmes ===
Year	Title	Role	Notes	Ref.
2012	X Factor	Herself (contestant)	Talent show; 12 episodes	
2013, 2017, 2021	Kuba Wojewódzki	Herself (guest)	Talk show; 3 episodes	
2014	Top Model	Herself (guest)	Reality show; episode aired 27 October 2014	
2015	Mamy cię!	Herself (guest)	Reality show; episode aired 8 March 2025	
2016	Lip Sync Battle Ustawka	Herself (contestant)	Talent show; episode aired 10 February 2016	
2016	Magiel towarzyski	Herself (guest)	Talk show; 1 episode	
2016–2018	Kocham cię, Polsko!	Herself (host)	Game show; 44 episodes	
2016–2018	The Voice of Poland	Herself (host)	Talent show; 36 episodes	
2018	Big Music Quiz	Herself (contestant)	Game show; episode aired 11 May 2018	
2018	The Story of My Life. Historia naszego życia	Herself (guest)	Talk show; episode aired 23 March 2018	
2018–2019	The Voice Kids	Herself (host)	Talent show; 32 episodes	
2019	Dance Dance Dance	Herself (host)	Talent show; 8 episodes	
2019	Dancing with the Stars. Taniec z gwiazdami	Herself (contestant)	Talent show; 10 episodes	
2021	To tylko kilka dni	Herself (guest)	Reality show; episode aired 13 June 2021	
2021, 2024	Twoja twarz brzmi znajomo	Herself (contestant)	Talent show; 20 episodes	
2022	Mask Singer	Herself (contestant)	Talent show; 3 episodes	
2022	Poranny rogal	Herself (host)	Talk show; 5 episodes	
2022	Project Cupid	Herself (host)	Game show; 10 episodes	
2024–2025	Cudowne lata	Herself (host)	Game show; 24 episodes	
2024–2025	Jaka to melodia?	Herself (contestant)	Game show; 2 episodes	
2024–2025	Pacześ Show	Herself (guest)	Talk show; episode aired 15 April 2024	
2025	Jaka to melodia?	Herself (contestant)	Game show; 2 episodes	
2025	LOL: Kto się śmieje ostatni	Herself (contestant)	Game show; 3 episodes	
2026	Hitster	Herself (contestant)	Game show; episode aired 3 October 2026	

=== Polish-language dubbing ===
Year	Title	Role	Notes	Ref.
2014	Maleficent	Thistlewit	Feature film	
2016	Barbie: Star Light Adventure	Barbie (singing voice)	Feature film	
2016	Zootopia	Dawn Bellwether	Feature film	
2017	My Little Pony: The Movie	Captain Celaeno	Feature film	
2019	Maleficent: Mistress of Evil	Thistlewit	Feature film	
2021	Space Jam: A New Legacy	Lola Bunny	Feature film	
2023	Barbie	Gloria	Feature film	
2025	Zootopia 2	Dawn Bellwether	Feature film	

=== Radio dramas ===
Year	Title	Role	Notes	Ref.
2015	Trzy świnki	Ryjek		
2020	Lalka	Kazimiera Wąsowska		
2022	Siekierki, czyli dzialkowy przewrót palacowy	Natalia	Radio drama series; 8 episodes	
2026	Biosfera	Évelyne	Radio drama series; 8 episodes	

== Theatre credits ==
Year	Title	Role	Venue	Director	Ref.
2008	Proces	Leni	National Academy of Theatre Arts (Kraków, Poland)	Wojciech Kościelniak	
2008	Sen nocy letniej	Helena	National Academy of Theatre Arts (Kraków, Poland)	Wojciech Kościelniak	
2010	Lobotomobil	Mrs. Nash	New Theatre (Poznań, Poland)	Janusz Wiśniewski	
2010	W sobotę o ósmej	Zoe	New Theatre (Poznań, Poland)	Mariusz Puchalski	
2010	Mary Stuart	Second voice	New Theatre (Poznań, Poland)	Waldemar Zawodziński	
2012	Deszczowa piosenka	Lina Lamont	Roma Musical Theatre (Warsaw, Poland)	Wojciech Kępczyński	
2013	Ale musicale!	No data	Roma Musical Theatre (Warsaw, Poland)	Sebastian Gonciarz	
2013	Old Love	No data	Gudejko Theatre (Warsaw, Poland)	Andrzej Chichłowski	
2014	Bromba w sieci	Malwinka	6th Floor Theatre (Warsaw, Poland)	Maciej Wojtyszko	
2015	Legalna blondynka	Elle Woods	Kraków Variété Theatre (Kraków, Poland)	Janusz Józefowicz	
2016	Miłość w Saybrook	Sandy	6th Floor Theatre (Warsaw, Poland)	Eugeniusz Korin	
2017	Chicago	Roxie Hart	Kraków Variété Theatre (Kraków, Poland)	Wojciech Kościelniak	
2021	Porwanie	No data	Spektaklove Scene (Warsaw, Poland)	Artur Barciś	
2022	O mało co...	No data	Adria Art (Bydgoszcz, Poland)	Jakub Wons	
2023	Do dwóch razy sztuka	Alexandra	Kraków Variété Theatre (Kraków, Poland)	Anna Gryszkówna	
2023	Kalina nie chce spać	No data	Comedy Theatre (Warsaw, Poland)	Agata Puszcz	
2023	Superprodukcja, czyli kręcimy Krzyżaków	Actress	Relax Scene (Warsaw, Poland)	Michał Paszczyk	
2024	Najlepsze na 6.piętrze	No data	6th Floor Theatre (Warsaw, Poland)	Eugeniusz Korin	
2025	Aniołki Mussoliniego	Giuditta Lescano	Roma Musical Theatre (Warsaw, Poland)	Łukasz Czuj	
2025	Genialny pomysł	Marion	Capitol Theatre (Warsaw, Poland)	Wojciech Adamczyk	
2025	Ina. Wolisz, kiedy się śmieję	No data	Danuta Baduszkowa Musical Theatre (Gdynia, Poland)	Katarzyna Dudzic-Grabińska	
2025	Karnawał warszawski	No data	Comedy Theatre (Warsaw, Poland)	Sławomir Narloch	

== Discography ==
=== Albums ===
Title	Details	Peak chart positions	Certifications	Ref.
Razem w święta (compilation album)	Released: December 2015; Label: Agora, Nu Music; Formats: CD, download, streaming	—N/a	—N/a	
Dwa głosy, jedno serce (compilation album)	Released: January 2025; Label: Studio Pro-Media; Formats: CD, download, streaming	—N/a	—N/a	

=== Singles ===
Title	Year	Peak positions	Certifications	Album	Ref.
"Dzień dobry, kocham cię" (with Librer)	2014	—N/a	—N/a	—N/a	
"Widok na sens" (with Marcin Lutz)	2023	—N/a	—N/a	—N/a	
"Bo Święta, to…" (with Rafał Szatan, Hanna Szatan, Henryk Szatan)	2025	—N/a	—N/a	Dwa głosy, jedno serce	

== Accolades and nominations ==
Awards and nominations received by Barbara Kurdej-Szatan
Award	Year	Category	Nominated work	Result	Ref.
Gwiazdy Plejady	2019	Best Style	—N/a	Won	
Snake Award	2015	Worst Actress	Dzień dobry, kocham cię!	Won	
Snake Award	2016	Worst Actress	Wkręceni 2	Nominated	
Snake Award	2019	Worst Actress	Unlucky Is Not a Sin	Nominated	
Telecameras	2015	Best Actress	—N/a	Won	
Telecameras	2016	Best Actress	—N/a	Won	
Telecameras	2017	Best Actress	—N/a	Won	
Telecameras	2018	Golden Telecamera	—N/a	Won	
TVN Turbo Plebiscite	2013	Woman of the Year	—N/a	Nominated	
