= Filip Lato =

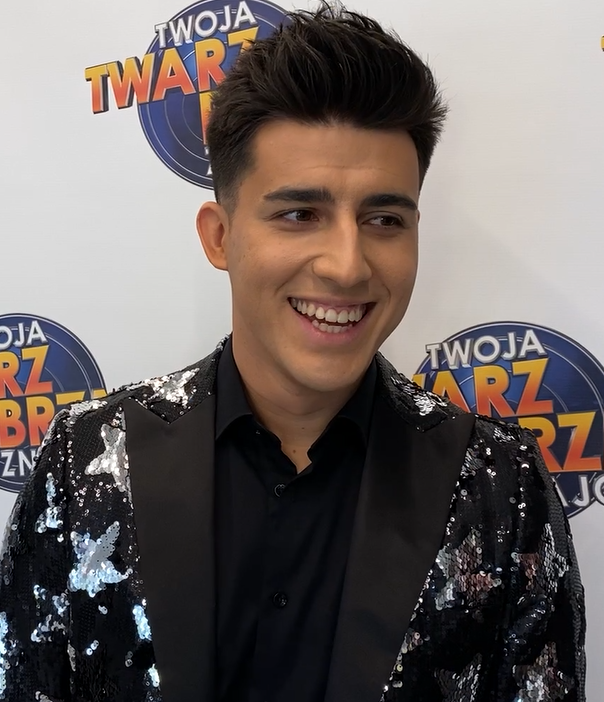
- Born: 31 October 1991 (age 34); Warsaw, Poland
- Occupations: Singer, musician, lawyer
- Years active: 2016–present

Filip Lato (born October 31, 1991) is a Polish singer, musician, and lawyer.

== Career ==
Lato plays the guitar and piano. In the autumn of 2016, he participated in the seventh season of the TVP2 program The Voice of Poland, where he reached the live episodes. On June 21, 2017, he recorded the single "100" with the band Sound’n’Grace, which achieved commercial success, including reaching third place on the AirPlay – Top chart for the most-played songs on Polish radio stations. On October 9 of the same year, he released his first solo track "Czy chcesz, czy nie" ("Whether You Want It or Not"), which was used in the soundtracks of the TV series W rytmie serca (Polsat) and Barwy szczęścia (TVP2).

In 2018, he won the final of the ninth season of the entertainment program Twoja twarz brzmi znajomo on Polsat and became a soloist on the musical quiz show Jaka to melodia? on TVP1. On October 5 of the same year, he released the album Halo Ziemia (Hello, Earth), which was promoted with the singles: "Halo Ziemia" (reached 21 place on the AirPlay – Top chart), "Krawiec", and "Zanim nas policzysz", recorded with Jula. In the spring of 2019, he was one of the jurors on the entertainment show Śpiewajmy razem. All Together Now on Polsat. In 2020, he appeared in the Christmas episode of Twoja twarz brzmi znajomo, and in the spring of 2024, he won the final of Twoja twarz brzmi znajomo. Najlepsi. In the autumn of 2024, he participated in the 15th season of Dancing with the Stars (Taniec z gwiazdami) on Polsat. On October 25, 2024, he released the single "Przy tobie" ("By Your Side").

He is educated as a lawyer, specializing in commercial law.

== Discography ==
=== Studio albums ===
| Year | Album | Release date | Label | Format |
|---|---|---|---|---|
| 2018 | Halo Ziemia | October 5, 2018 | Gorgo Music, My Music | CD, digital download |

=== Singles ===
As a main artist:

| Year | Title | Certifications | Album |
|---|---|---|---|
| 2018 | "Halo Ziemia" | – | Halo Ziemia |
| 2018 | "Krawiec" ("Tailor") | – | Halo Ziemia |
| 2019 | "Zanim nas policzysz" ("Before You Count Us") feat. Jula | Platinum (POL) | Halo Ziemia |
| 2024 | "Przy tobie" ("By Your Side") | – | – |

As a guest artist:

| Year | Title | Album |
|---|---|---|
| 2017 | "100" (with Sound’n’Grace, guest: Filip Lato) | Życzenia |
| 2018 | "Kiedy pytasz" (DJ Remo, guest: Filip Lato and Eldo) | Sekret |
