= Wszyscy kochają Romana =

- Genre: Sitcom
- Written by: Katarzyna Krzysztopik; Karol Klementewic
- Directed by: Jerzy Bogajewicz
- Starring: Bartłomiej Kasprzykowski; Aneta Todorczuk-Perchuć; Anna Seniuk; Joachim Lamża; Tede
- Country of origin: Poland
- Original language: Polish
- No. of seasons: 1
- No. of episodes: 4

Production
- Running time: 22 minutes

Original release
- Network: TVN
- Release: 2 September 2011

Wszyscy kochają Romana (Everybody Loves Roman) is a Polish television sitcom that premiered on TVN on 2 September 2011. The series is a Polish-language adaptation of the American Emmy Awards winner, Everybody Loves Raymond and stars Bartłomiej Kasprzykowski as the titular Roman, a newspaper sportswriter.

The first four episodes were aired on Friday nights at 8:00 pm. On 30 September 2011 TVN announced the suspension of the series due to low ratings. Joanna Górska, TVN PR chief said that the network was looking for a new timeslot for the series. The last 11 episodes will be aired.

== Cast and characters ==
- Bartłomiej Kasprzykowski as Roman (Ray)
- Aneta Todorczuk-Perchuć as Dorota (Debra)
- Anna Seniuk as Maryla (Marie)
- Joachim Lamża as Zygmunt (Frank)
- Tede as Robert (Robert)

== Episodes ==
Season	Timeslot	Episodes	Originally aired	
Season	Timeslot	Episodes	Season premiere	Season finale
1	Friday 8:00 PM 2 Sep – 23 Sep	15	2 September 2011	—N/a
