= Małgorzata Walewska =

Polish opera singer

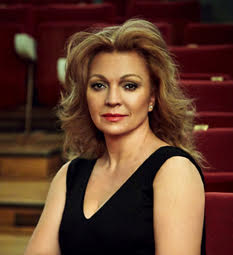
- Born: 5 July 1965 (age 61); Warsaw, Polish People's Republic
- Education: Chopin University of Music
- Occupation: Opera singer (mezzo-soprano)
- Website: malgorzatawalewska.com

Małgorzata Walewska (born 5 July 1965) is a Polish opera singer, dramatic mezzo-soprano.

== Biography ==
=== Education ===
Born in Warsaw, Poland, Małgorzata Walewska graduated from the Fryderyk Chopin Academy of Music under the tutelage of Halina Słonicka. She is a laureate and finalist of many international competitions, such as Alfredo Kraus in Las Palmas., Luciano Pavarotti in Philadelphia, Belvedere in Vienna and Stanisław Moniuszko in Warsaw.

=== Operatic career ===
During her studies, in 1991 Walewska debuted as Aza in Manru at the Polish National Opera. Her next engagements included Bremen Theater and the Vienna State Opera where she debuted as Polina in The Queen of Spades followed by performances of Carmen, Maddalena in Rigoletto, Olga in Eugene Onegin, Pierotto in Linda di Chamounix. There, for the first time, she worked with such great artists as Luciano Pavarotti and Plácido Domingo. The following years brought her engagements at the Semperoper in Dresden, where she performed the part of Ms. Quickly in Falstaff, and Ulrica in Un ballo in maschera (1999), and at the Deutsche Oper Berlin, again as Ms. Quickly, as Amneris in Aida, and for the first time as Azucena in Il trovatore. In 2006 Walewska debuted at the Metropolitan Opera in New York as Dalila in Samson et Dalila, where José Cura was her stage partner. At the Metropolitan Opera Walewska also sung the parts of Santuzza and Amneris. In 2006 she also sung the role of Eboli in Don Carlos on the stage of the New National Theater in Tokyo. In 2007 she came back to the Deutsche Oper Berlin to sing the title role in Cassandra, and again in 2011 to sing Dalila. Other important debuts on international stages were Azucena at the Royal Opera House in Covent Garden (2009), Amme in Die Frau ohne Schatten at the Palacio de Bellas Artes in Mexico City (2012) and Dalila at the Grand Théâtre de Genève (2012), where the orchestra was conducted by Michel Plasson. In 2015 she added the part of Kundry in Richard Wagner's Parsifal at the Poznań Grand Theatre and sung the role of Countess in The Queen of Spades at the Opéra national du Rhin in Strassburg. In 2016 Walewska had her role debut as the Widow in Władysław Żeleński's opera Goplana at the Polish National Opera. The production won an Award for Rediscovered Work at the 2017 International Opera Awards. In June 2018, the artist performed the part of Mistress Quickly at the Cologne Opera.

=== Concert career ===
Małgorzata Walewska has a very rich concert repertoire. She often gives recitals with the accompaniment of piano or harp. Her program includes songs of Polish and international composers such as G. Fauré, F. Schubert, S. Moniuszko, K. Szymanowski, F. Chopin, or P. Tchaikovsky, as well as song cycles such as Les nuits d'été by H. Berlioz or Wesendonck Lieder by R. Wagner. Since 2013 she sings French song repertoire, such as for example songs of R. Hahn, to the accompaniment of a harp played by Małgorzata Zalewska.

=== Recordings and awards ===
Małgorzata Walewska recorded numerous CDs, starting with pieces which belong to her usual repertoire (e.g. Voce di donna published by Sony Classical), through Christmas Carols (Christmas Time - Traditional Polish Christmas Carols published by DUX), Crossover arrangements (Walewska and Friends issued by DUX, or Mezzo by Sony Music Poland CD), arias of G.F. Händel's, and religious and organ pieces (Farny issued by DUX). On the list of the American magazineTime in 1999, she was included among the ten most famous Poles as "one of the stars that illuminate the way for Poland in the next millennium". In a ranking Pearls of the Polish Economy 2008 she was awarded with Honorary Pearl in the culture category, for promoting Polish culture in the world. In October 2016, Małgorzata Walewska has received a Gloria Artis medal of the highest class in recognition of her tremendous contribution to Polish culture. It is the most prestigious decoration bestowed by the Polish Ministry of Culture and National Heritage. In the 2017/2018 season Małgorzata Walewska has recorded W. Kilar's Missa pro pace with Podlaska Philharmonic Orchestra under the baton of Mirosław Jacek Błaszczyk as well as the part of Jochebed, the mother of Moses in A. Rubinstein's religious opera Moses with Polish Sinfonia Iuventus Orchestra under the baton of Michail Jurowski.

=== Other engagements ===
Since 2014 she is one of the Juries in a popular TV show Twoja twarz brzmi znajomo (polish version of Your Face Sounds Familiar). In 2015, Małgorzata Walewska was nominated Artistic Director of the Ada Sari International Vocal Artistry Festival and Competition held in Nowy Sącz, Poland.

=== Private life ===
Małgorzata Walewska currently lives in Warsaw in Poland. She has one daughter, Alicja Kokosińska, who is a promising young set designer.

== Repertoire ==
=== Opera ===
- Béla Bartók, A kékszakállú herceg vára, Judit
- Georges Bizet, Carmen, Carmen
- Hector Berlioz, La damnation de Faust, Marguerite
- Vittorio Gnecchi, Cassandra, Cassandra
- Pietro Mascagni, Cavalleria rusticana, Santuzza
- Jules Massenet, Werther, Charlotte
- Claudio Monteverdi, L'incoronazione di Poppea, Arnalta
- Ignacy Jan Paderewski, Manru, Aza
- Amilcare Ponchielli, La Gioconda, La Cieca
- Camille Saint-Saëns, Samson et Dalila, Dalila
- Richard Strauss, Die Frau ohne Schatten, Die Amme
- Igor Stravinsky, Oedipus Rex, Jocasta
- Pyotr Ilyich Tchaikovsky, Eugene Onegin, Olga
- Pyotr Ilyich Tchaikovsky, The Queen of Spades, Polina, Countess
- Giuseppe Verdi, Aida, Amneris
- Giuseppe Verdi, Don Carlos, Princess Eboli
- Giuseppe Verdi, Falstaff, Mistress Quickly
- Giuseppe Verdi, Il trovatore, Azucena
- Giuseppe Verdi, Nabucco, Fenena
- Giuseppe Verdi, Rigoletto, Maddalena
- Giuseppe Verdi, Un ballo in maschera, Ulrica
- Richard Wagner, Parsifal, Kundry

=== Oratorio ===
- Johann Sebastian Bach, Magnificat
- Ludwig van Beethoven, Symphony No. 9
- Anton Bruckner, Te Deum
- Gustav Mahler, Symphonies No. 2 and 3
- Wolfgang Amadeus Mozart, Coronation Mass
- Giovanni Battista Pergolesi, Stabat Mater
- Gioachino Rossini, Stabat Mater
- Gioachino Rossini, Petite messe solennelle
- Giuseppe Verdi, Messa da Requiem

== Discography ==
- 1993 – Gala Lirica Vol.1; Orquesta Sinfónica y Coro de RTVE - Habanera from G. Bizet's Carmen (recording from the laureate concert of Spanish Competitions in Madrid)
- 1995 – Te Deum; A.Bruckner - C.Gounod
- 2000 – first solo recording Voce Di Donna
- 2000 – Mezzo
- 2001 – Guest appearance on the CD Ave Maria - Najpiękniejsze Pieśni Maryjne – utwory „Ave Maria” i „Zdrowaś Maryja” - Małgorzata Walewska was awarded by the Field Bishop with a Milito pro Christo medal for an outstanding interpretation of Ave Maria. The album quickly reached platinum status
- 2001 – CD with the soundtrack for the movie Quo Vadis and Jerzy Kawalerowicz's song promoting the film - Dove Vai - another CD with platinum status
- 2002 – Guest appearance on a CD of the band I Muvrini - Umani; the song Erein eta joan
- 2004 – Walewska and Friends - double album issued by Dux, it was distinguished with the Ace of Empik- an award for the best selling album
- 2007 – Szymanowski, Wagner Songs – Małgorzata Walewska and Oskar Jezior
- 2009 – Farny - Małgorzata Walewska and Robert Grudzień - album recorded in July 2009 in a church in Kazimierz Dolny
- 2011 – Christmas Time - Traditional Polish Christmas Carols - CD with traditional Polish Christmas Carols
- 2012 – Mezzo - reedition of Małgorzata Walewska's CD Mezzo enriched by the song Dove Vai with participation of Fiolka and Michał Bajor
- 2014 – The Spirit of Tango - an album with live arecording of a concert with the participation of Martín Palmeri – piano, Mario Stefano Pietrodarchi – bandoneon, Amadeus Polish Radio Chamber Orchestra and the Chamber Choir of the Adam Mickiewicz University in Poznań
- 2017 - Wojciech Kilar: Missa pro pace - a recording of Wojciech Kilar's "Missa pro pace" with Podlaska Philharmonic Orchestra under the baton of Mirosław Jacek Błaszczyk
