= Aneta Todorczuk-Perchuć =

Polish actress and vocalist (born 1978)

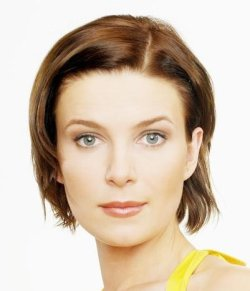

Aneta Todorczuk-Perchuć (born 9 December 1978, in Białystok) is a Polish actress and vocalist. She is affiliated with the Warsaw musical theatre, Studio Buffo.

== Films ==
- 2002–2007 - Samo Życie
- 2004–2006 - Pensjonat pod Różą
- 2004 - Stacyjka
- 2001 - Kameleon
- 1999–2006 - Na dobre i na złe
