= Katarzyna Skrzynecka =

Polish actress

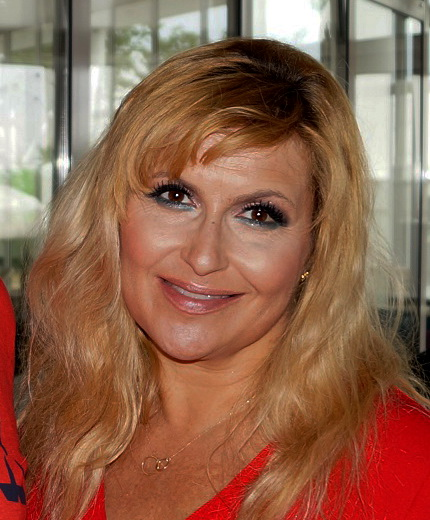
- Katarzyna Skrzynecka
- Born: Katarzyna Barbara Skrzynecka; 3 December 1970 (age 55); Warsaw, Poland
- Occupations: Singer, actress
- Years active: 1985–present

Katarzyna Barbara Skrzynecka (born 3 December 1970) is a Polish actress and singer. She appeared in the comedy television series Bao-Bab, czyli zielono mi in 2003.

Skrzynecka won the first season of Polsat's show Twoja twarz brzmi znajomo, choosing to perform as Sarah Brightman and Andrea Bocelli's "Time to Say Goodbye" in the final. She is now a judge on the panel of the show.
