= Kasia Wilk =

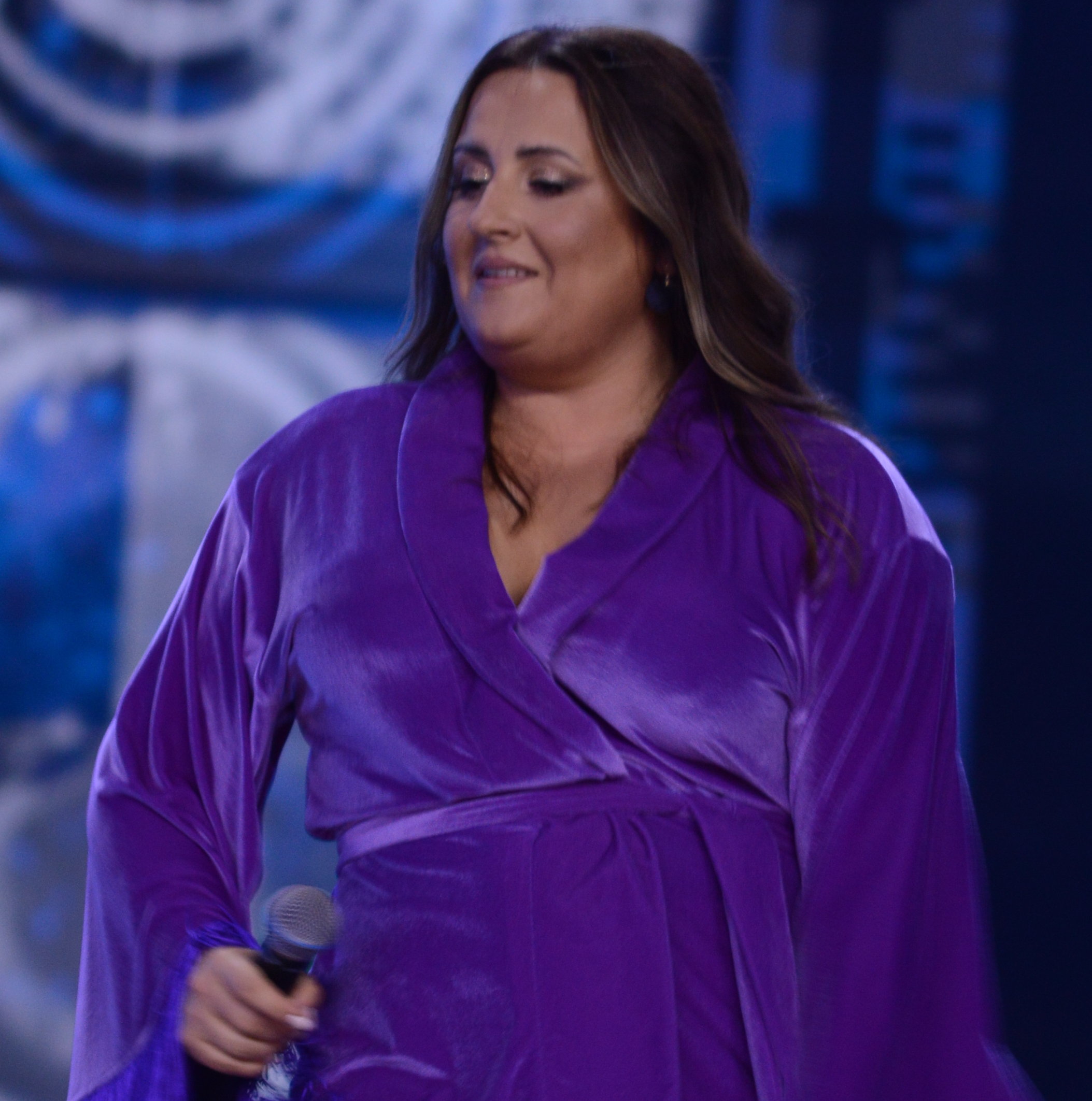

Background information
- Born: 3 January 1982 (age 44)
- Origin: Lubin, Poland
- Genres: Pop
- Occupation: singer
- Labels: My Music, Universal Music Poland
- Website: www.kasiawilk.com

Katarzyna Wilk (born 3 January 1982 in Lubin, Poland) is a Polish contemporary rhythm and blues singer, more commonly known as Kasia Wilk.

In 2008, she began her solo career with the hit single "Pierwszy raz" which reached position 51 on the Polish National Top 50 music chart. Previously she was a vocalist for KTO TO, Dreamland, and Groovestreet. She has also collaborated with Mezo. In 2004, she received an award at the Polish National Song Festival in memory of Anna Jantar.

== Discography ==
=== Solo albums ===
Title	Album details
Unisono	Released: 3 November 2008; Label: My Music; Formats: CD, digital download
Drugi raz	Released: 28 November 2011; Label: Universal Music Poland; Formats: CD, digital download

=== Collaborative albums ===
Title	Album details	Peak chart positions	Sales	Certifications
Title	Album details	POL	Sales	Certifications
Jedenaście with KTO TO	Released: 26 September 2005; Label: My Music; Formats: CD, digital download	3		
Eudaimonia with Mezo and Tabb	Released: 16 October 2006; Label: UMC Records; Formats: CD, digital download	17	POL: 15,000+	POL: Gold
"—" denotes a recording that did not chart or was not released in that territory.
