= Anna Nowak =

Polish actress and TV presenter (born 1966)

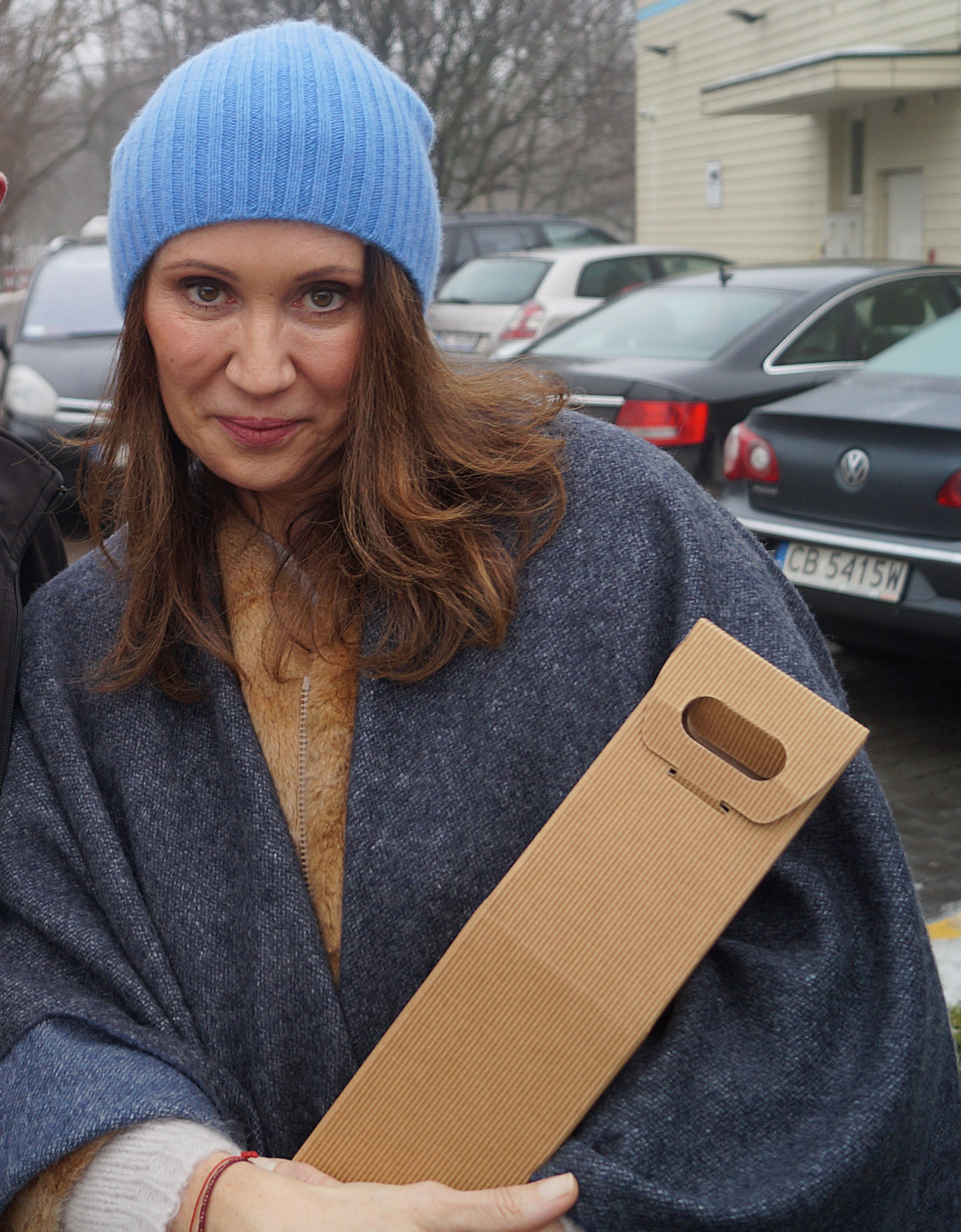
- Nowak in 2017.
- Born: 10 October 1966 (age 59); Warsaw, Poland
- Occupations: Actress, TV presenter
- Spouse: Krzysztof Ibisz
- Children: 1

Anna Nowak-Ibisz (born 10 October 1966) is a Polish actress and TV presenter.

== Career ==
In 1989 Nowak graduated from the Acting Department of the Łódź Film School, and then until 1993, she was associated with the Studio Theater in Warsaw. She made her theater debut on 24 February 1990. In the years 1990–2009, she played the role of a Polish immigrant Urszula Winicka in the series Lindenstraße, the first soap opera on German television. From 8 March to 26 April 2009, she participated in the ninth edition of the TVN entertainment program Taniec z Gwiazdami, and together with Cezary Olszewski, she took fifth place. Since 2011, she has been running the program Pani gadget, and from 2019 also Pani gadget erotic, both broadcast on TVN Style. In 2017, she took part in the advertising campaign of the Winiary food brand.

== Personal life ==
From 2005 to 2009, Nowak was the wife of Krzysztof Ibisz, with whom she has a son, Vincent (born in 2006).
