= Bartłomiej Kasprzykowski =

Polish actor

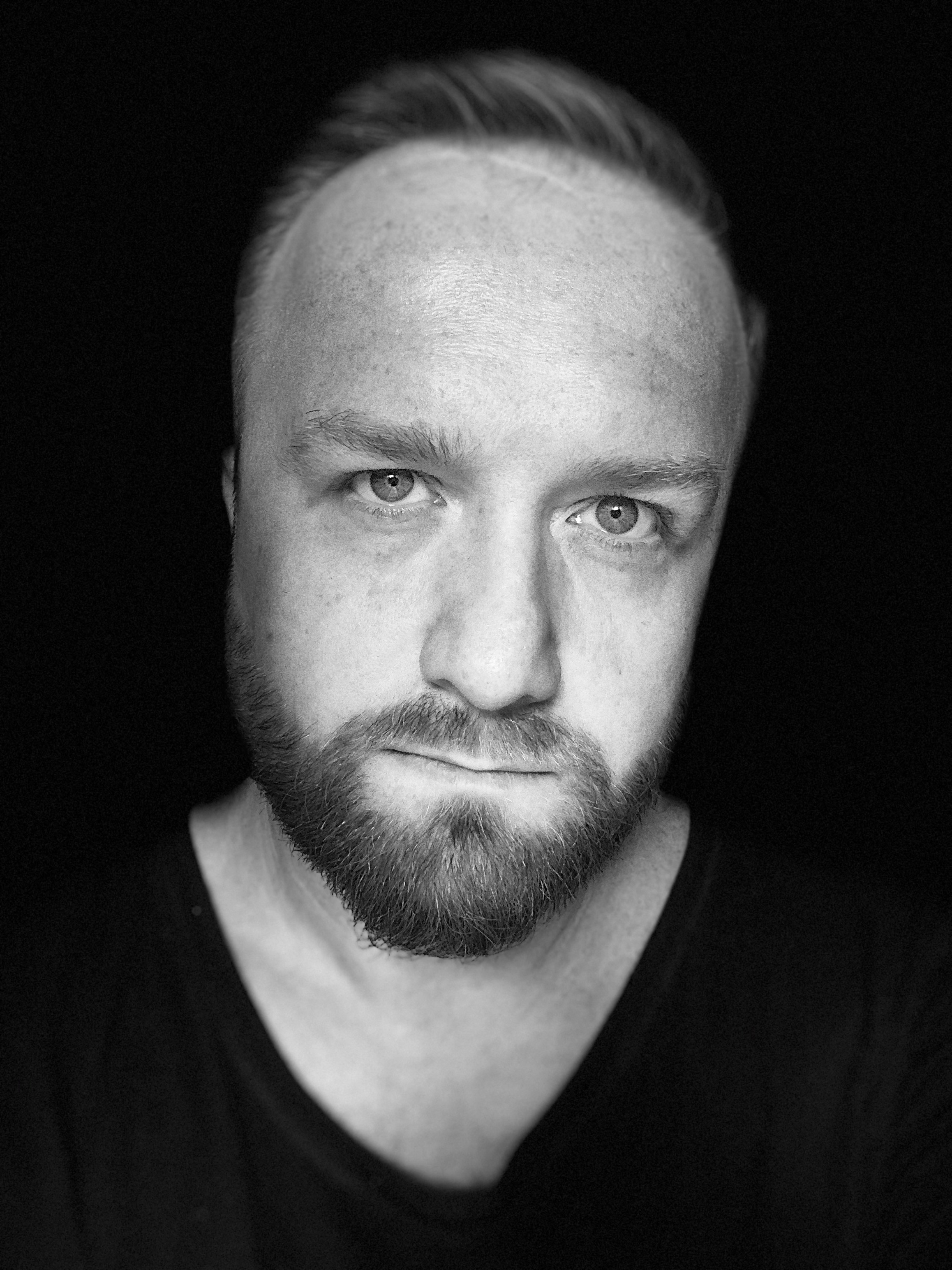
Bartek Kasprzykowski, 2022

Bartłomiej "Bartek" Kasprzykowski (born 19 May 1977) is a Polish actor. He participated in Taniec z gwiazdami, the Polish version of Dancing with the Stars. He also won the fourth edition of Twoja twarz brzmi znajomo - the Polish version of Your Face Sounds Familiar.

== Actor ==
- 1998: Syzyfowe prace − as Andrzej Radek
- 1999: Świat według Kiepskich − as a policeman (episode 22)
- 2000: Syzyfowe prace − as Andrzej Radek
- 2000: Nie ma zmiłuj − as Rysiek, a salesman
- 2005: Karol - człowiek, który został papieżem − as cpt. Łukowski
- 2005–2007: Magda M. − as Wojciech Płaska
- 2007: Hania − as Janek Gabriel, Ola's friend
- 2007: Niania − as Bartek (odc. 82)
- 2007: Halo Hans! − Karol vel Jan Kos vel Hans Klopss, agent J-24
- 2008–2009: Teraz albo nigdy! − as Robert Orkisz, Marta's husband
- 2008–2016: Ranczo − as Father Robert
- 2009: Grzeszni i bogaci − as Rodżer Blejk
- 2009: Dom nad rozlewiskiem − as the dentist Janusz Lisowski
- 2010: Duch w dom − as dentist (episode 1)
- 2010: Milczenie jest złotem − as Jurek
- 2011: Wszyscy kochają Romana − as Roman
- 2011: Życie nad rozlewiskiem − as the dentist Janusz Lisowski (episode 8)
- 2012: Na dobre i na złe − as Wywrocki (episode 472)

=== Dubbing ===
- 2008: Asterix na olimpiadzie − as Mordikus
- 2010: Toy Story 3 − as Ken
