= Be My Guest (Fats Domino song) =

Single by Fats Domino
- B-side: "I've Been Around"
- Released: October 1959
- Recorded: September 26, 1959
- Genre: New Orleans rhythm and blues
- Length: 2:08
- Label: Imperial Records
- Songwriters: Fats Domino, John Marascalco, Tommy Boyce
- Producer: Dave Bartholomew

Fats Domino singles chronology
"I Want To Walk You Home" (1959)	"Be My Guest" (1959)	"Country Boy" (1960)

"Be My Guest" is a song written by Fats Domino, John Marascalco and Tommy Boyce. Arranged and produced by Dave Bartholomew and recorded by Domino on September 26, 1959, it was released as a single by Imperial Records the following month and reached number 8 on the Billboard pop chart, number 2 on the R&B chart, and number 11 on the UK singles chart.

The song was Boyce's first hit as a writer. He reportedly waited six hours at Domino's hotel room to present him with the demo, and got Domino to promise to listen to the song. In later years Boyce went on to further success, notably writing songs for the Monkees with Bobby Hart.

While many of Fats Domino's and other New Orleans rhythm and blues recordings became popular in the Caribbean, as they were heard on radio there, the accentuated off beat rhythm of "Be My Guest" has been specifically mentioned as contributing to the development of ska music in Jamaica in the late 1950s and early 1960s, by being played frequently on local sound systems. Other musicians who have recorded the song included Emile Ford and the Checkmates (1960), Millie Small (1965), and Daniel O'Donnell (2005).
