= Robert Janowski =

Polish actor, singer, veterinarian, TV presenter

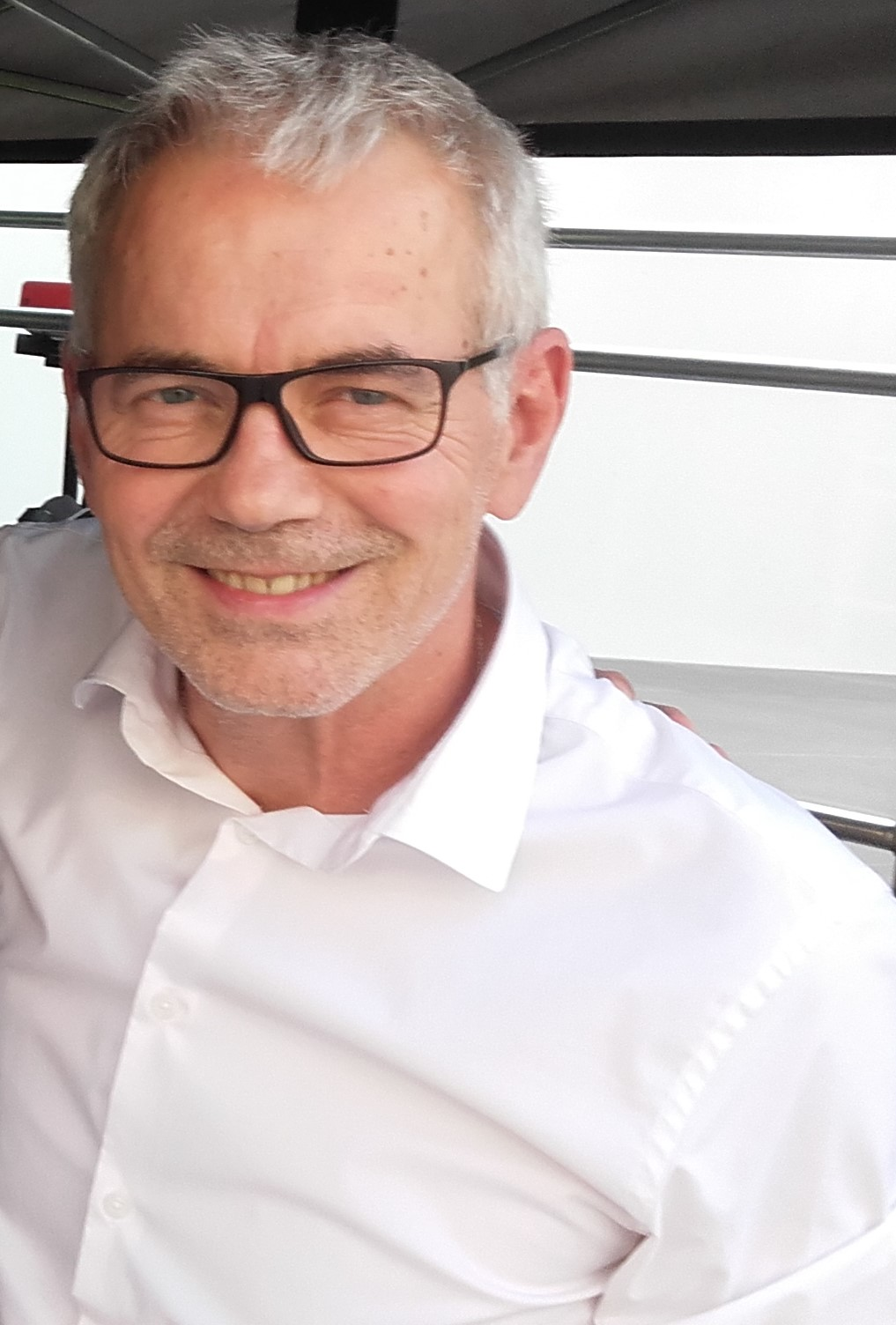
- Robert Janowski, 2020
- Born: Robert Mariusz Janowski; 22 March 1961 (age 65); Inowrocław, Poland
- Occupations: Singer, actor, TV presenter, journalist
- Known for: Metro; Jaka to melodia?
- Website: www.robertjanowski.pl

Robert Mariusz Janowski (born 22 March 1961) is a Polish singer, TV presenter and musical journalist. He is also a veterinarian by profession. He is known for the role of Jan in the musical Metro in the 1990s and for hosting the TV programme Jaka to melodia? (Polish version of Name That Tune) from 1997–2018. Besides his acting and musical achievements, Janowski has also published several books of poetry.
