= Jaka to melodia? =

- Directed by: Zbigniew Proszowski (in the beginning); Marek Bik; Agnieszka Krótki-Żmijewska (2017/2018 season); Mikołaj Dobrowolski (since 11 March 2020)
- Presented by: Robert Janowski (1997–2018, 2024–); Jacek Borkowski (Note: Stood in for Janowski for six episodes in April 2001.) (2001); Norbi (2018–2019); Rafał Brzozowski (2019–2024)
- Country of origin: Poland
- Original language: Polish
- No. of episodes: ca. 5525

Production
- Running time: 24–42 minutes
- Production companies: Media Corporation (1997–2018); ZPR Media (2018-present)

Original release
- Network: TVP1
- Release: 4 September 1997 – present

Jaka to melodia? (meaning "What Melody Is It?") is the licensed Polish variation of the classic game show Name That Tune, running every year since 1997 on TVP1. It is licensed by Prestige Entertainment Group and Sandy Frank Film Syndication. The show is noted for frequently interrupting game play to feature performances of the songs guessed either by the host or by other singers, all accompanied by a live band.

The program is hosted by Rafał Brzozowski, a singer, who replaced Norbi in 2019, as TVP swapped the two hosts; Norbi was swapped to TVP's Wheel of Fortune, while Brozowski went to Jaka to melodia?. On the 6 August 2024, it was announced that Robert Janowski would return to Jaka to melodia? on the 31 August.

== Gameplay ==
=== Round 1 ===
Three players compete for cash. They are shown five artists, each starting at 100 PLN. The value increases by 10 PLN until it reaches 200 PLN if no one correctly identifies the song. The first person to buzz in and name that tune wins the cash value shown. Play continues until all five artists are used. Control is determined by the person who gave the last correct answer, and begins with the player in the middle. Whenever no correct guess occurs, the person to the right of the person who gave the last correct answer (or first person if the third player gave the last correct answer) originally selected the next artist. This was later changed to so that the one who gave the last correct answer would always pick the next artist if no guess occurred.

=== Round 2 ===
Same as Round 1, except the cash value for each artist starts at 200 zlotys and counts down by 10 zlotys from 200 to 100. At the end of this round, the third-place contestant is eliminated from gameplay, but keeps their cash and also wins a set of chocolates. Tie-breakers are used if the two low scores are equal.

=== Round 3: Bid-a-Note ===
Six artists are shown although only five are in play, and the host gives clues for contestants. Each player alternates between selecting the topic and giving the opening bid. The player in first place selects the first topic. The other player places a bid based on the clues to how many notes they need to guess the title, and the pianist plays those notes. If the note guesser gets the tune right, he/she wins 200 zlotys. If not, the topic selector wins 200 zlotys. Play alternates between players until five artists are used, or until one player wins 600 zlotys. The person with the biggest grand total at the end wins and goes on to the final round. The other player leaves with their cash and chocolates.

Rules were subsequently changed to follow the classic rules of Bid-a-Note. The player who bids no longer guesses the title automatically. Instead, the format is changed to an auction format. If the player bids two or more notes, the opponent can bid fewer notes. Once a player bids one note or the opponent passes, the auction ends and the player with the low bid will guess. Play is still to 600 zlotys, though, and this is added to the grand total to determine the winner.

=== Round 4: Golden Medley ===
In the Golden Medley round, the player has 30 seconds to guess seven tunes. Each tune named awards 250 zlotys. If all seven are guessed, the player wins an additional 10,000 zlotys. Players hit their buzzer to stop the clock. They can pass on any tunes and come back if time permits. When the clock reaches zero, the player will have one final opportunity to guess automatically. The game ends on any wrong answer, including not answering when the clock has reached zero.

=== Performances ===
In the first three rounds, the host will occasionally call for a performance of the tune just guessed, always done only after a correct answer. This is used to fill the time as TVP is a public broadcasting channel, it is non-commercial. Because of this, the show begins after the titles with a performance, and a performance happens during the credits. The host himself will sometimes provide the vocals. Other performances involve the actual artists themselves (one 2012 episode had Basia performing her hit song Baby, You're Mine after a celebrity contestant guessed the title).
