= Poland in the Eurovision Song Contest 2019 =

- Eurovision Song Contest 2019
- Participating broadcaster: Telewizja Polska (TVP)
- Country: Poland
- Selection process: Internal selection
- Announcement date: Artist: 15 February 2019; Song: 8 March 2019

Competing entry
- Song: "Fire of Love (Pali się)"
- Artist: Tulia
- Songwriters: Nadia Dalin; Sonia Krasny; Allan Rich; Jud Friedmann

Placement
- Semi-final result: Failed to qualify (11th)

Participation chronology

Poland was represented at the Eurovision Song Contest 2019 with the song "Fire of Love (Pali się)" written by Nadia Dalin, Sonia Krasny, Allan Rich and Jud Friedmann. The song was performed by the group Tulia. In January 2019, the Polish broadcaster Telewizja Polska (TVP) announced that the Polish entry for the 2019 contest in Tel Aviv, Israel would be selected through an internal selection. Tulia was announced as the Polish entrant on 15 February 2019, while the song "Fire of Love (Pali się)" was presented to the public on 8 March 2019.

Poland was drawn to compete in the first semi-final of the Eurovision Song Contest which took place on 14 May 2019. Performing during the show in position 4, "Fire of Love (Pali się)" was not announced among the top 10 entries of the first semi-final and therefore did not qualify to compete in the final. It was later revealed that Poland placed eleventh out of the 17 participating countries in the semi-final with 120 points.

== Background ==
Prior to the 2019 contest, Poland had participated in the Eurovision Song Contest twenty-one times since its first entry in 1994. Poland's highest placement in the contest, to this point, has been second place, which the nation achieved with its debut entry in 1994 with the song "To nie ja!" performed by Edyta Górniak. Poland has only, thus far, reached the top ten on two other occasions, when Ich Troje performing the song "Keine Grenzen – Żadnych granic" finished seventh in 2003, and when Michał Szpak performing the song "Color of Your Life" finished eighth in 2016. Between 2005 and 2011, Poland failed to qualify from the semi-final round six out of seven years with only their 2008 entry, "For Life" performed by Isis Gee, managing to take the nation to the final during that period. After once again failing to qualify to the final in 2011, the country withdrew from the contest during 2012 and 2013. Since returning to the contest in 2014, Poland managed to qualify to the final each year before failing to qualify to the final in 2018 with their entry "Light Me Up" performed by Gromee featuring Lukas Meijer.

The Polish national broadcaster, Telewizja Polska (TVP), broadcasts the event within Poland and organises the selection process for the nation's entry. TVP confirmed Poland's participation in the 2019 Eurovision Song Contest on 4 May 2018. Between 2016 and 2018, TVP organised televised national finals that featured a competition among several artists and songs in order to select the Polish entry for the Eurovision Song Contest. However, on 23 January 2019, TVP announced that the Polish entry for the 2019 Eurovision Song Contest would be selected via an internal selection. The last time the Polish entry was selected internally was in 2015.

== Before Eurovision ==
=== Internal selection ===
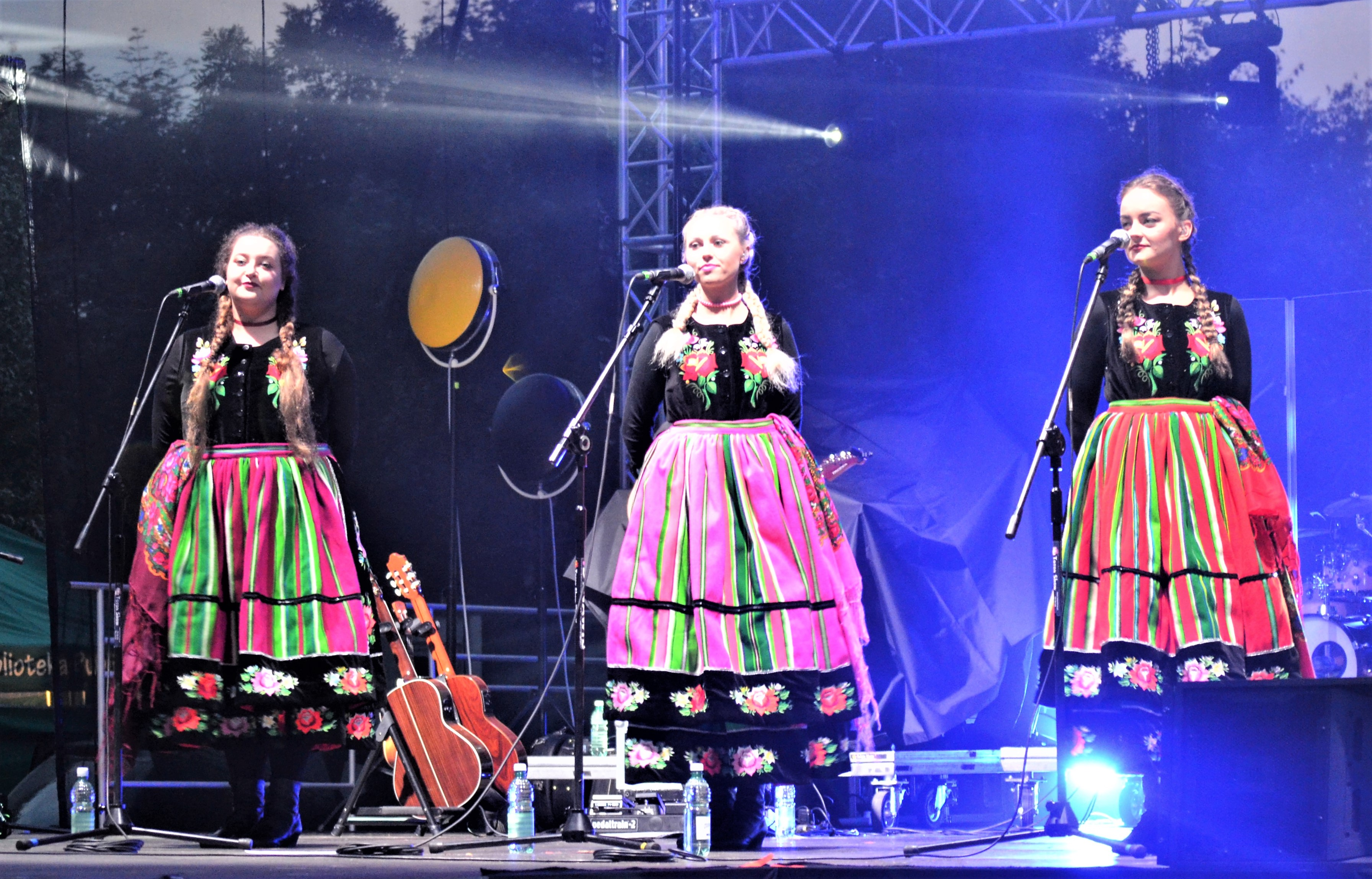
The group Tulia was internally selected to represent Poland in the Eurovision Song Contest 2019

TVP announced in January 2019 that the Polish entry for the 2019 Eurovision Song Contest would be selected via an internal selection and would be presented in February 2019. The broadcaster opened a submission period for interested artists and songwriters to submit their entries between 23 January 2019 and 5 February 2019. TVP received 140 submissions at the closing of the deadline, including entries from Lidia Kopania, who represented Poland in the Eurovision Song Contest in 2009, and Magdalena Tul, who represented Poland in the Eurovision Song Contest in 2011. A selection committee, which among its members included director Konrad Smuga, reviewed the received submissions and selected the Polish entry.

On 15 February 2019, it was announced that the group Tulia would represent Poland in the Eurovision Song Contest 2019. The song "Fire of Love (Pali się)", written by Nadia Dalin, Sonia Krasny, Allan Rich and Jud Friedmann, was presented to the public on 8 March 2019 via the release of the official music video, directed by Anna Zofia Powierża, on the official Eurovision Song Contest's YouTube channel. A Polish language version of the song, titled "Pali się", was also recorded and released in November 2018, but was edited for the Eurovision Song Contest and featured additional lyrics in English.

==== Music video controversy ====
The music video for the Polish version of "Fire of Love (Pali się)" featured a wayside cross but was removed in the music video for the bilingual Eurovision version. Following allegations of censorship and discrimination against Christians despite both videos being nearly identical apart from the erasure of the cross, General Director of TVP Jacek Kurski called for the record company Universal Music Polska to restore the original version of the music video. Tulia's management later stated in an interview that the cross was removed due to European Broadcasting Union (EBU) restrictions on the promotion of political institutions, and that they themselves were not responsible for the editing of the video. However, a figure of John of Nepomuk is still visible in the background of the music video for the Eurovision version.

=== Promotion ===
Tulia made several appearances across Europe to specifically promote "Fire of Love (Pali się)" as the Polish Eurovision entry. On 6 April, Tulia performed during the Eurovision in Concert event which was held at the AFAS Live venue in Amsterdam, Netherlands and hosted by Cornald Maas and Marlayne. On 14 April, Tulia performed during the London Eurovision Party, which was held at the Café de Paris venue in London, United Kingdom and hosted by Nicki French and Paddy O'Connell. Tulia also performed during the Eurovision Spain Pre-Party, which was held at the Sala La Riviera venue in Madrid, Spain on 19 and 20 April.

== At Eurovision ==
According to Eurovision rules, all nations with the exceptions of the host country and the "Big Five" (France, Germany, Italy, Spain and the United Kingdom) are required to qualify from one of two semi-finals in order to compete for the final; the top ten countries from each semi-final progress to the final. The European Broadcasting Union (EBU) split up the competing countries into six different pots based on voting patterns from previous contests, with countries with favourable voting histories put into the same pot. On 28 January 2019, a special allocation draw was held which placed each country into one of the two semi-finals, as well as which half of the show they would perform in. Poland was placed into the first semi-final, to be held on 14 May 2019, and was scheduled to perform in the first half of the show.

Once all the competing songs for the 2019 contest had been released, the running order for the semi-finals was decided by the shows' producers rather than through another draw, so that similar songs were not placed next to each other. Poland was set to perform in position 4, following the entry from Finland and before the entry from Slovenia.

The two semi-finals and the final were broadcast in Poland on TVP1, TVP2 and TVP Polonia with commentary by Artur Orzech. The three shows also aired on a one-day delay on TVP Rozrywka. The Polish spokesperson, who announced the top 12-point score awarded by the Polish jury during the final, was Mateusz Szymkowiak.

=== Semi-final ===
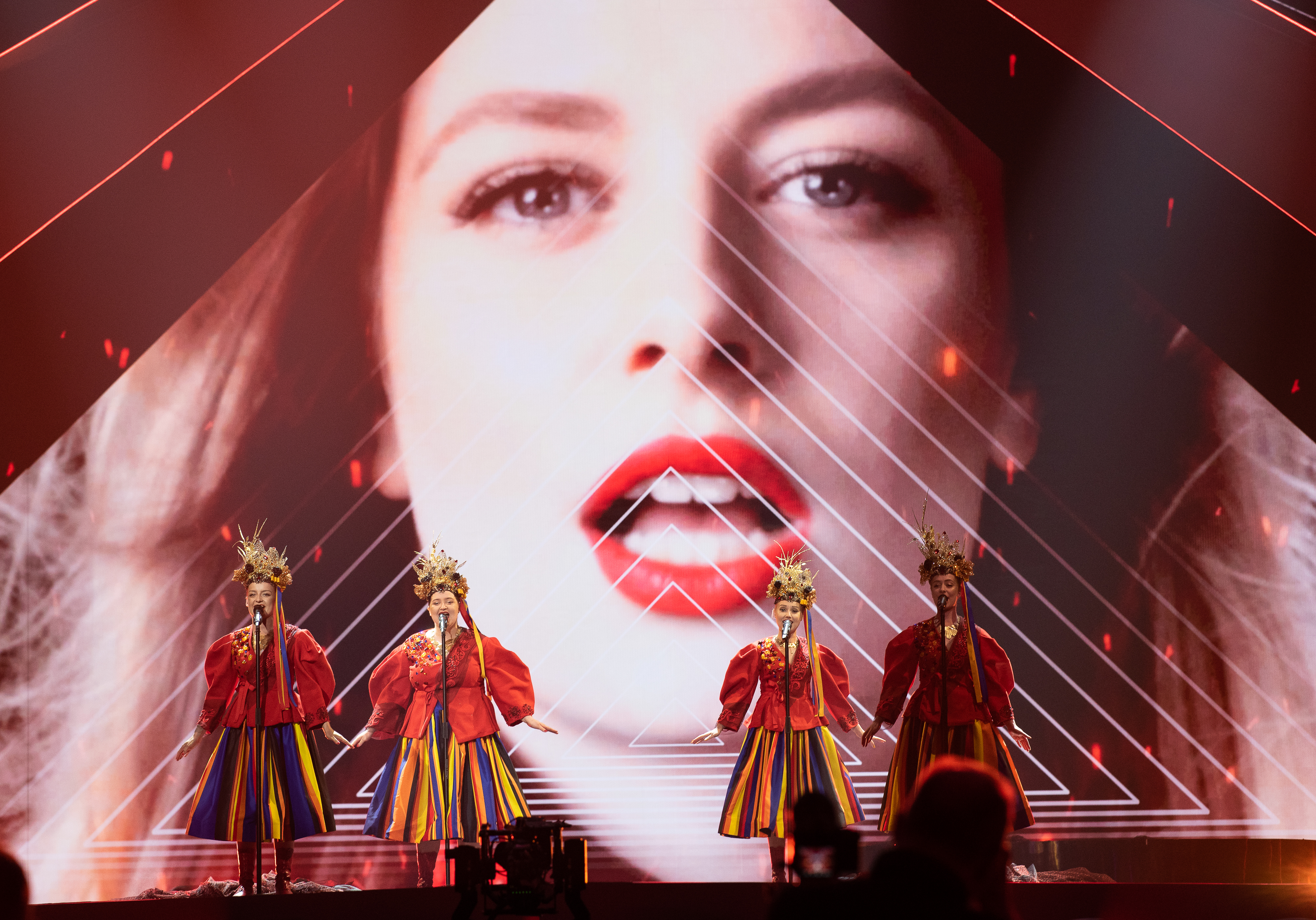
Tulia during a rehearsal before the first semi-final

Tulia took part in technical rehearsals on 4 and 9 May, followed by dress rehearsals on 13 and 14 May. This included the jury show on 13 May where the professional juries of each country watched and voted on the competing entries.

The Polish performance featured the members of Tulia performing in red veils, which they removed to reveal red tops and multi-coloured frilled skirts with gold traditional headwear and coloured ribbons. The performers initially stood in a circle on a rotating raised round platform before moving into position facing the audience with forward and back arrangements and performing a choreographed routine. The stage was predominately in red and yellow colours with the LED screens displaying a close-up video of the four singers in black and white. The Polish performance was directed by Konrad Smuga.

At the end of the show, Poland was not announced among the top 10 entries in the first semi-final and therefore failed to qualify to compete in the final. It was later revealed that Poland placed eleventh in the semi-final, receiving a total of 120 points: 60 points from the televoting and 60 points from the juries. Following unconfirmed reports that the votes of Czech juror Jitka Zelenková had been reversed, Poland would have qualified to the final instead of Belarus, which placed tenth in the semi-final with a difference of 2 points. With the old voting system, Poland would also have qualified instead of Belarus and place ninth with 67 points.

=== Voting ===
Voting during the three shows involved each country awarding two sets of points from 1-8, 10 and 12: one from their professional jury and the other from televoting. Each nation's jury consisted of five music industry professionals who are citizens of the country they represent, with their names published before the contest to ensure transparency. This jury judged each entry based on: vocal capacity; the stage performance; the song's composition and originality; and the overall impression by the act. In addition, no member of a national jury was permitted to be related in any way to any of the competing acts in such a way that they cannot vote impartially and independently. The individual rankings of each jury member as well as the nation's televoting results were released shortly after the grand final.

Below is a breakdown of points awarded to Poland and awarded by Poland in the first semi-final and grand final of the contest, and the breakdown of the jury voting and televoting conducted during the two shows:

==== Points awarded to Poland ====
Points awarded to Poland (Semi-final 1)
| Score | Televote | Jury |
|---|---|---|
| 12 points | | |
| 10 points | | Finland |
| 8 points | France; Iceland | Australia; Hungary |
| 7 points | Czech Republic | Czech Republic; Estonia |
| 6 points | Finland; Hungary | Belarus |
| 5 points | Australia; Belarus; Belgium; San Marino | Israel |
| 4 points | | |
| 3 points | | Portugal; Serbia; Slovenia |
| 2 points | Estonia; Israel | |
| 1 point | Slovenia | |

==== Points awarded by Poland ====
Points awarded by Poland (Semi-final 1)
| Score | Televote | Jury |
|---|---|---|
| 12 points | Iceland | Australia |
| 10 points | Australia | Serbia |
| 8 points | Slovenia | Slovenia |
| 7 points | Estonia | Czech Republic |
| 6 points | San Marino | Hungary |
| 5 points | Czech Republic | Iceland |
| 4 points | Serbia | Cyprus |
| 3 points | Hungary | Belgium |
| 2 points | Belarus | Portugal |
| 1 point | Belgium | Finland |

Points awarded by Poland (Final)
| Score | Televote | Jury |
|---|---|---|
| 12 points | Iceland | Australia |
| 10 points | Netherlands | Slovenia |
| 8 points | Norway | North Macedonia |
| 7 points | Italy | Serbia |
| 6 points | Australia | France |
| 5 points | Switzerland | Denmark |
| 4 points | Slovenia | Malta |
| 3 points | Russia | Iceland |
| 2 points | Azerbaijan | Azerbaijan |
| 1 point | Czech Republic | Norway |

==== Detailed voting results ====
The following members comprised the Polish jury:

- Anna Wyszkoni (jury chairperson) – musician, vocalist
- Maciej Durczak – music producer
- Dominika Gawęda – singer of Blue Café
- Paweł Rurak-Sokal – musician, composer, represented Poland in the 2004 contest as part of Blue Café
- Rafał Brzozowski – singer, composer, future Polish representative in the 2021 contest

Detailed voting results from Poland (Semi-final 1)
| R/O | Country | Jury | | | | | | | Televote | |
| R/O | Country | A. Wyszkoni | M. Durczak | D. Gawęda | P. Rurak-Sokal | R. Brzozowski | Rank | Points | Rank | Points |
|---|---|---|---|---|---|---|---|---|---|---|
| 01 | Cyprus | 12 | 14 | 6 | 5 | 9 | 7 | 4 | 14 | |
| 02 | Montenegro | 13 | 15 | 12 | 7 | 8 | 11 | | 16 | |
| 03 | Finland | 9 | 11 | 11 | 14 | 6 | 10 | 1 | 15 | |
| 04 | Poland | | | | | | | | | |
| 05 | Slovenia | 2 | 3 | 2 | 3 | 3 | 3 | 8 | 3 | 8 |
| 06 | Czech Republic | 5 | 5 | 3 | 2 | 7 | 4 | 7 | 6 | 5 |
| 07 | Hungary | 6 | 6 | 4 | 6 | 4 | 5 | 6 | 8 | 3 |
| 08 | Belarus | 15 | 13 | 14 | 11 | 5 | 13 | | 9 | 2 |
| 09 | Serbia | 4 | 4 | 1 | 1 | 2 | 2 | 10 | 7 | 4 |
| 10 | Belgium | 8 | 8 | 7 | 9 | 13 | 8 | 3 | 10 | 1 |
| 11 | Georgia | 14 | 12 | 13 | 10 | 14 | 14 | | 13 | |
| 12 | Australia | 1 | 1 | 5 | 4 | 1 | 1 | 12 | 2 | 10 |
| 13 | Iceland | 3 | 2 | 9 | 15 | 10 | 6 | 5 | 1 | 12 |
| 14 | Estonia | 11 | 9 | 8 | 12 | 12 | 12 | | 4 | 7 |
| 15 | Portugal | 7 | 7 | 10 | 8 | 16 | 9 | 2 | 11 | |
| 16 | Greece | 16 | 10 | 15 | 13 | 15 | 16 | | 12 | |
| 17 | San Marino | 10 | 16 | 16 | 16 | 11 | 15 | | 5 | 6 |

Detailed voting results from Poland (Final)
| R/O | Country | Jury | | | | | | | Televote | |
| R/O | Country | A. Wyszkoni | M. Durczak | D. Gawęda | P. Rurak-Sokal | R. Brzozowski | Rank | Points | Rank | Points |
|---|---|---|---|---|---|---|---|---|---|---|
| 01 | Malta | 12 | 21 | 4 | 4 | 20 | 7 | 4 | 22 | |
| 02 | Albania | 15 | 14 | 18 | 16 | 18 | 20 | | 23 | |
| 03 | Czech Republic | 11 | 15 | 6 | 9 | 10 | 11 | | 10 | 1 |
| 04 | Germany | 21 | 20 | 19 | 25 | 16 | 21 | | 24 | |
| 05 | Russia | 8 | 13 | 26 | 24 | 11 | 16 | | 8 | 3 |
| 06 | Denmark | 17 | 7 | 7 | 7 | 5 | 6 | 5 | 16 | |
| 07 | San Marino | 25 | 24 | 22 | 26 | 17 | 26 | | 19 | |
| 08 | North Macedonia | 9 | 9 | 1 | 2 | 3 | 3 | 8 | 15 | |
| 09 | Sweden | 14 | 10 | 13 | 11 | 15 | 15 | | 12 | |
| 10 | Slovenia | 3 | 3 | 2 | 1 | 6 | 2 | 10 | 7 | 4 |
| 11 | Cyprus | 20 | 17 | 12 | 14 | 25 | 19 | | 20 | |
| 12 | Netherlands | 10 | 12 | 14 | 13 | 7 | 14 | | 2 | 10 |
| 13 | Greece | 23 | 19 | 25 | 17 | 26 | 24 | | 25 | |
| 14 | Israel | 16 | 26 | 24 | 18 | 21 | 23 | | 21 | |
| 15 | Norway | 7 | 5 | 15 | 23 | 9 | 10 | 1 | 3 | 8 |
| 16 | United Kingdom | 26 | 23 | 16 | 12 | 13 | 18 | | 26 | |
| 17 | Iceland | 6 | 4 | 17 | 22 | 12 | 8 | 3 | 1 | 12 |
| 18 | Estonia | 13 | 11 | 21 | 21 | 14 | 17 | | 13 | |
| 19 | Belarus | 18 | 18 | 20 | 20 | 24 | 22 | | 17 | |
| 20 | Azerbaijan | 5 | 8 | 10 | 10 | 19 | 9 | 2 | 9 | 2 |
| 21 | France | 2 | 2 | 11 | 6 | 8 | 5 | 6 | 11 | |
| 22 | Italy | 24 | 25 | 9 | 3 | 23 | 13 | | 4 | 7 |
| 23 | Serbia | 4 | 6 | 3 | 5 | 2 | 4 | 7 | 18 | |
| 24 | Switzerland | 19 | 16 | 8 | 15 | 4 | 12 | | 6 | 5 |
| 25 | Australia | 1 | 1 | 5 | 8 | 1 | 1 | 12 | 5 | 6 |
| 26 | Spain | 22 | 22 | 23 | 19 | 22 | 25 | | 14 | |
