= Taniec z gwiazdami season 21 =

Taniec z gwiazdami
- Season 21
- Hosted by: Krzysztof Ibisz; Paulina Sykut-Jeżyna
- Judges: Iwona Pavlović; Andrzej Grabowski; Ola Jordan; Michał Malitowski
- Celebrity winner: Beata Tadla
- Professional winner: Jan Kliment
- No. of episodes: 10

Release
- Original network: Polsat
- Original release: 2 March – 11 May 2018

Season chronology
- ← Previous; Season 20 Next → Season 22

The 21st season of Taniec z gwiazdami, the Polish edition of Dancing With the Stars, started on 2 March 2018. This is the eighth season aired on Polsat. Paulina Sykut-Jeżyna and Krzysztof Ibisz returned as hosts and Iwona Pavlović, Michał Malitowski and Andrzej Grabowski returned as judges. Ola Jordan replaced Beata Tyszkiewicz as the fourth judge.

On 11 May, Beata Tadla and her partner Jan Kliment were crowned the champions.

== Couples ==
Celebrity	Occupation	Professional partner	Status
Antek Smykiewicz	Singer & The Voice of Poland runner-up	Agnieszka Kaczorowska	Eliminated 1st on 9 March 2018
Jarosław Kret	Nowa TV weather presenter	Lenka Klimentová	Eliminated 2nd on 9 March 2018
Wiktoria Gąsiewska	Actress & television presenter	Oskar Dziedzic	Eliminated 3rd on 16 March 2018
Martyna Kupczyk	Nasz nowy dom designer	Żora Korolyov †	Eliminated 4th on 23 March 2018
Renata Kaczoruk	Model and actress	Michał Jeziorowski	Eliminated 5th on 6 April 2018
Krzysztof Gojdź	Doctor of aesthetic medicine	Valeriya Zhuravlyova	Eliminated 6th on 13 April 2018
Angelika Mucha	YouTuber and influencer known as Littlemooonster96	Rafał Maserak	Eliminated 7th on 20 April 2018
Dariusz Wieteska	Na sygnale actor	Katarzyna Vu Manh	Eliminated 8th on 27 April 2018
Popek	Rapper, actor and MMA fighter	Janja Lesar	Third place on 4 May 2018
Katarzyna Dziurska	Personal trainer and bodybuilder	Tomasz Barański	Runners-up on 11 May 2018
Beata Tadla	Nowa TV presenter	Jan Kliment	Winners on 11 May 2018

== Scores ==
Couple	Place	1	2	1+2	3	4	5	6	7	8	9		10
Beata & Jan	1	28	23	51	22	31	31	35	35+27=62	30+32=62	40+34=74†	—	33+40+39=112‡
Katarzyna & Tomasz	2	30†	31†	61†	24	30	39†	34+2=36†	37+35=72†	35+38=73†	37+35=72	+40=112†	35+40+40=115†
Popek & Janja	3	28	22	50	32†	27	36	29	22+35=57‡	34+37=71	27+30=57‡	+35=92‡	
Dariusz & Katarzyna	4	19	30	49	20	24	28+3=31	24+1=25‡	28+31=59	22+26=48‡			
Angelika & Rafał	5	22	24	46	19	28	34	29+2=31	25+33=58				
Krzysztof & Valeriya	6	23	21	44	18‡	20‡	28	24+1=25‡					
Renata & Michał	7	30†	30	60	31	38†	23‡						
Martyna & Żora	8	21	23	44	27	27							
Wiktoria & Oskar	9	27	30	57	26								
Jarosław & Lenka	10	12‡	14‡	26‡									
Antek & Agnieszka	11	19	18	37									

Red numbers indicate the lowest score for each week.
Green numbers indicate the highest score for each week.
indicates the couple eliminated that week.
indicates the returning couple that finished in the bottom two or three.
indicates the couple saved from elimination by immunity.
indicates the winning couple.
indicates the runner-up.
indicates the couple in third place.

== Average score chart ==
This table only counts for dances scored on a traditional 40-points scale.

Rank by average	Place	Couple	Total points	Number of dances	Average
1	2	Katarzyna & Tomasz	560	16	35.0
2	1	Beata & Jan	480	15	32.0
3	7	Renata & Michał	152	5	30.4
4	3	Popek & Janja	394	13	30.3
5	9	Wiktoria & Oskar	83	3	27.7
6	5	Angelika & Rafał	214	8	26.8
7	4	Dariusz & Katarzyna	252	10	25.2
8	8	Martyna & Żora	98	4	24.5
9	6	Krzysztof & Valeriya	134	6	22.3
10	11	Antek & Agnieszka	37	2	18.5
11	10	Jarosław & Lenka	26	2	13.0

== Highest and lowest scoring performances ==
The best and worst performances in each dance according to the judges' 40-point scale are as follows:

Dance	Best dancer(s)	Highest score	Worst dancer(s)	Lowest score
Cha-cha-cha	Katarzyna Dziurska	40	Jarosław Kret	12
Jive	Katarzyna Dziurska; Beata Tadla	30	Antek Smykiewicz	19
Tango	Katarzyna Dziurska; Popek	35	Dariusz Wieteska	19
Waltz	Popek	35	Popek	28
Jazz	Angelika Mucha	24		
Paso Doble	Katarzyna Dziurska	37	Krzysztof Gojdź	21
Viennese Waltz	Katarzyna Dziurska	35	Beata Tadla	22
Salsa	Wiktoria Gąsiewska	26	Jarosław Kret	14
Foxtrot	Renata Kaczoruk	38	Beata Tadla	23
Quickstep	Katarzyna Dziurska	35	Antek Smykiewicz; Krzysztof Gojdź	18
Rumba	Katarzyna Dziurska	38	Dariusz Wieteska	24
Samba	Katarzyna Dziurska	37	Popek; Dariusz Wieteska	22
Argentine Tango	Beata Tadla	40	Dariusz Wieteska	26
Contemporary	Katarzyna Dziurska; Beata Tadla	40	Beata Tadla	35
Freestyle	Katarzyna Dziurska	40	Beata Tadla	39

== Couples' highest and lowest scoring dances ==
According to the traditional 40-point scale:

Couples	Highest scoring dance(s)	Lowest scoring dance(s)
Beata & Jan	Argentine Tango, Contemporary (40)	Viennese Waltz (22)
Katarzyna & Tomasz	Contemporary, Cha-cha-cha, Freestyle (40)	Quickstep (24)
Popek & Janja	Contemporary (37)	Cha-cha-cha, Samba (22)
Dariusz & Katarzyna	Rumba (31)	Tango (19)
Angelika & Rafał	Samba (34)	Quickstep (19)
Krzysztof & Valeriya	Foxtrot (28)	Quickstep (18)
Renata & Michał	Foxtrot (38)	Cha-cha-cha (23)
Martyna & Żora	Viennese Waltz, Rumba (27)	Tango (21)
Wiktoria & Oskar	Viennese Waltz (30)	Salsa (26)
Jarosław & Lenka	Salsa (14)	Cha-cha-cha (12)
Antek & Agnieszka	Jive (19)	Quickstep (18)

== Weekly scores ==
Unless indicated otherwise, individual judges scores in the charts below (given in parentheses) are listed in this order from left to right: Iwona Pavlović, Andrzej Grabowski, Ola Jordan and Michał Malitowski.

=== Week 1: Season Premiere ===
No elimination took place. At the end of the show it was revealed that Popek & Janja had the highest combined total of judges' scores and viewer votes, and the bottom two were Antek & Agnieszka and Jarosław & Lenka, who had the lowest total of judges' scores.

Running order

Couple	Score	Dance	Music
Beata & Jan	28 (6,9,8,5)	Cha-cha-cha	"Havana"—Camila Cabello
Antek & Agnieszka	19 (3,6,6,4)	Jive	"Locked Out of Heaven"—Bruno Mars
Martyna & Żora	21 (4,7,7,3)	Tango	"Don't Stop The Music"—Rihanna
Jarosław & Lenka	12 (2,5,4,1)	Cha-cha-cha	"Moves like Jagger"—Maroon 5 featuring Christina Aguilera
Katarzyna & Tomasz	30 (6,9,8,7)	Jive	"Crazy Little Thing Called Love"—Queen
Dariusz & Katarzyna	19 (3,6,6,4)	Tango	"Co mi Panie dasz?"—Bajm
Renata & Michał	30 (6,9,8,7)	Waltz	"You Light Up My Life"—Whitney Houston
Wiktoria & Oskar	27 (5,8,8,6)	Jive	"Happy"—Pharrell Williams
Krzysztof & Valeriya	23 (4,8,7,4)	Tango	"Aleja gwiazd"—Zdzisława Sośnicka
Angelika & Rafał	22 (3,7,7,5)	Cha-cha-cha	"Can't Stop the Feeling"—Justin Timberlake
Popek & Janja	28 (6,9,7,6)	Waltz	"Beauty and the Beast"—Ariana Grande and John Legend

=== Week 2: Passion Night ===
Running order

Couple	Score	Dance	Music	Result
Katarzyna & Tomasz	31 (7,9,8,7)	Cha-cha-cha	"Flashdance... What a Feeling"—Irene Cara	Safe
Angelika & Rafał	24 (4,8,7,5)	Jazz	"Love Yourself"—Justin Bieber	Safe
Krzysztof & Valeriya	21 (5,7,6,3)	Paso Doble	"Theme from Mission: Impossible"—Lalo Schifrin	Safe
Wiktoria & Oskar	30 (7,9,8,6)	Viennese Waltz	"Flower Waltz"—Pyotr Ilyich Tchaikovsky	Safe
Jarosław & Lenka	14 (2,6,4,2)	Salsa	"Despacito"—Luis Fonsi	Eliminated
Renata & Michał	30 (6,9,8,7)	Tango	"Back to Black"—Amy Winehouse	Safe
Popek & Janja	22 (5,8,4,5)	Cha-cha-cha	"Kung Fu Fighting"—Carl Douglas	Safe
Beata & Jan	23 (4,8,6,5)	Foxtrot	"Śniadanie do łóżka"—Andrzej Piaseczny	Safe
Antek & Agnieszka	18 (3,7,5,3)	Quickstep	"Super Mario Bros. theme"—Koji Kondo	Eliminated
Martyna & Żora	23 (4,7,7,5)	Cha-cha-cha	"Sugar"—Maroon 5	Safe
Dariusz & Katarzyna	30 (7,9,8,6)	Paso Doble	"It's My Life"—Bon Jovi	Safe

=== Week 3: Wedding Party ===
Running order

Couple	Score	Dance	Music	Result
Angelika & Rafał	19 (3,6,6,4)	Quickstep	"Prawy do lewego"—Kayah & Goran Bregović	Safe
Renata & Michał	31 (7,10,8,6)	Rumba	"Od dziś"—Paulla	Bottom two
Katarzyna & Tomasz	24 (4,8,7,5)	Quickstep	"Jedzie pociąg z daleka"—Ryszard Rynkowski	Safe
Martyna & Żora	27 (5,9,7,6)	Viennese Waltz	"Mam cudownych rodziców"—Urszula Sipińska	Safe
Wiktoria & Oskar	26 (5,9,6,6)	Salsa	"Przez twe oczy zielone"—Akcent	Eliminated
Popek & Janja	32 (8,9,8,7)	Rumba	"Zawsze tam, gdzie Ty"—Lady Pank	Safe
Krzysztof & Valeriya	18 (3,8,4,3)	Quickstep	"Żono moja"—Masters	Safe
Beata & Jan	22 (4,8,6,4)	Viennese Waltz	"Moje jedyne marzenie"—Anna Jantar	Safe
Dariusz & Katarzyna	20 (5,7,6,2)	Cha-cha-cha	"Ostatni raz zatańczysz ze mną"—Krzysztof Krawczyk	Safe

=== Week 4: Polish Friday ===
Running order

Couple	Score	Dance	Music	Result
Beata & Jan	31 (8,9,8,6)	Samba	"100"–Sound'n'Grace feat. Filip Lato	Bottom two
Krzysztof & Valeriya	20 (4,8,5,3)	Cha-cha-cha	"Light Me Up"—Gromee feat. Lukas Meijer	Safe
Dariusz & Katarzyna	24 (5,9,6,4)	Rumba	"Color of Your Life"—Michał Szpak	Safe
Angelika & Rafał	28 (6,9,8,5)	Argentine Tango	"Swoje szczęście znam"—Feel	Safe
Renata & Michał	38 (10,10,10,8)	Foxtrot	"Zagubiony"—Enej	Safe
Martyna & Żora	27 (6,8,7,6)	Rumba	"Mimochodem"—Anna Wyszkoni	Eliminated
Popek & Janja	27 (4,9,7,7)	Tango	"W płomieniach"—Mateusz Ziółko	Safe
Katarzyna & Tomasz	30 (7,9,7,7)	Samba	"Piątek"—Lanberry	Safe

=== Week 5: Hometown Glory ===
Running order

Couple	Score	Dance	Music	Result
Dariusz & Katarzyna	28 (7,9,7,5)	Quickstep	"A Little Less Conversation"—Elvis Presley	Bottom two
Renata & Michał	23 (4,8,5,6)	Cha-cha-cha	"I Don't Like It, I Love It"—Flo Rida feat. Robin Thicke and Verdine White	Eliminated
Beata & Jan	31 (8,9,7,7)	Rumba	"Careless Whisper"—George Michael	Safe
Popek & Janja	36 (9,10,9,8)	Paso Doble	"Human"—Rag'n'Bone Man	Safe
Katarzyna & Tomasz	39 (10,10,10,9)	Contemporary	"Dusk Till Dawn"—Zayn Malik feat. Sia	Safe
Krzysztof & Valeriya	28 (6,9,8,5)	Foxtrot	"Every Breath You Take"—The Police	Safe
Angelika & Rafał	34 (8,9,9,8)	Samba	"Nie mów mi nie"—Marta Gałuszewska	Safe
Dariusz & Katarzyna; Katarzyna & Tomasz; Popek & Janja; Angelika & Rafał; Beata & Jan; Renata & Michał; Krzysztof & Valeriya	3 - - - - - -	Disco (Marathon)	"Ride on Time"—Black Box "What Is Love?"—Haddaway	

=== Week 6: The Crazy 90's ===
Running order

Couple	Score	Dance	Music	Result
Krzysztof & Valeriya	24 (4,10,5,5)	Salsa	"It's My Life"—Dr. Alban	Eliminated
Katarzyna & Tomasz	34 (8,10,9,7)	Foxtrot	"I Want It That Way"—Backstreet Boys	Safe
Angelika & Rafał	29 (6,9,8,6)	Jive	"No Limit"—2 Unlimited	Safe
Popek & Janja	29 (7,9,7,6)	Viennese Waltz	"Crazy"—Aerosmith	Safe
Dariusz & Katarzyna	24 (5,9,5,5)	Salsa	"Coco Jamboo"—Mr. President	Bottom two
Beata & Jan	35 (9,10,9,7)	Contemporary	"(Everything I Do) I Do It for You"—Bryan Adams	Safe

Dance-offs
Couple	Judges votes	Dance	Music	Result
Beata & Jan	Angelika, Beata, Angelika, Angelika	Samba	"The Rhythm of the Night"—Corona	Loser
Angelika & Rafał	Angelika, Beata, Angelika, Angelika	Samba	"The Rhythm of the Night"—Corona	Winner (2 pts)
Katarzyna & Tomasz	Katarzyna, Popek, Katarzyna, Katarzyna	Jive	"Be My Lover"—La Bouche	Winner (2 pts)
Popek & Janja	Katarzyna, Popek, Katarzyna, Katarzyna	Jive	"Be My Lover"—La Bouche	Loser
Dariusz & Katarzyna	Dariusz, Krzysztof, Dariusz, Krzysztof	Cha-cha-cha	"Rhythm Is a Dancer"—Snap!	Draw (1 pts)
Krzysztof & Valeriya	Dariusz, Krzysztof, Dariusz, Krzysztof	Cha-cha-cha	"Rhythm Is a Dancer"—Snap!	Draw (1 pts)

=== Week 7: Dedications Night ===
Running order

Couple	Score	Dance	Music	Result
Popek & Janja	22 (4,8,5,5)	Samba	"Chained to the Rhythm"—Katy Perry featuring Skip Marley	Bottom two
Popek & Janja	35 (9,10,9,7)	Waltz	"Faded"—Alan Walker	Bottom two
Angelika & Rafał	25 (3,9,7,6)	Tango	"A wszystko to... (bo ciebie kocham)"—Ich Troje	Eliminated
Angelika & Rafał	33 (7,10,8,8)	Cha-cha-cha	"There's Nothing Holdin' Me Back"—Shawn Mendes	Eliminated
Dariusz & Katarzyna	28 (6,9,7,6)	Foxtrot	"You Are Not Alone"—Michael Jackson	Safe
Dariusz & Katarzyna	31 (8,9,7,7)	Rumba	"Ruchome piaski"—Varius Manx	Safe
Beata & Jan	35 (8,10,9,8)	Paso Doble	"Like a Prayer"—Madonna	Safe
Beata & Jan	27 (5,9,7,6)	Foxtrot	"Kill Em with Kindness"—Selena Gomez	Safe
Katarzyna & Tomasz	37 (9,10,9,9)	Samba	"Livin' la Vida Loca"—Ricky Martin	Safe
Katarzyna & Tomasz	35 (7,10,9,9)	Viennese Waltz	"Perfect"—Ed Sheeran	Safe

=== Week 8: Romantic Places ===
Running order

Couple	Score	Dance	Music	Result
Katarzyna & Tomasz	35 (8,10,9,8)	Tango	"Can't Get You Out of My Head"—Kylie Minogue	Bottom two
Katarzyna & Tomasz	38 (10,10,10,8)	Rumba	"Paris Paris"—Malcolm McLaren & Catherine Deneuve	Bottom two
Dariusz & Katarzyna	22 (5,8,6,3)	Samba	"Locked Away"—Rock City ft. Adam Levine	Eliminated
Dariusz & Katarzyna	26 (6,8,6,6)	Argentine Tango	"Santa María (Del Buen Ayre)"—Gotan Project	Eliminated
Beata & Jan	30 (6,9,7,8)	Jive	"Feel It Still"—Portugal. The Man	Safe
Beata & Jan	32 (8,9,8,7)	Viennese Waltz	"Ti amo"—Umberto Tozzi	Safe
Popek & Janja	34 (9,10,8,7)	Cha-cha-cha	"Love Me Again"—John Newman	Safe
Popek & Janja	37 (9,10,9,9)	Contemporary	"Empire State of Mind"—Alicia Keys	Safe

=== Week 9: Semifinal ===
Running order

Couple (Judge)	Score	Dance	Music	Result
Beata & Jan (Iwona Pavlović)	40 (10,10,10,10)	Argentine Tango	"El Choclo"—Ángel Villoldo	Safe
Beata & Jan (Iwona Pavlović)	34 (8,10,8,8)	Cha-cha-cha	"Rzuć to wszystko co złe"—Zbigniew Wodecki	Safe
Popek & Janja (Ola Jordan)	27 (6,9,8,4)	Jive	"Gettin' in the Mood"—The Brian Setzer Orchestra	Bottom two
Popek & Janja (Ola Jordan)	30 (7,9,8,6)	Viennese Waltz	"Lubię wracać tam, gdzie byłem"—Zbigniew Wodecki	Bottom two
Katarzyna & Tomasz (Michał Malitowski)	37 (8,10,10,9)	Paso Doble	"Don't Let Me Be Misunderstood"—The Animals	Bottom two
Katarzyna & Tomasz (Michał Malitowski)	35 (8,10,9,8)	Foxtrot	"Zacznij od Bacha"—Zbigniew Wodecki	Bottom two

Dance-off

Running order

Couple	Score	Dance	Music	Result
Popek & Janja	35 (8,10,9,8)	Tango	"W płomieniach"—Mateusz Ziółko	Third place
Katarzyna & Tomasz	40 (10,10,10,10)	Contemporary	"Dusk Till Dawn"—Zayn Malik feat. Sia	Safe

=== Week 10: Season Finale ===
Running order

Couple	Score	Dance	Music	Result
Katarzyna & Tomasz	35 (8,9,9,9)	Quickstep	"Jedzie pociąg z daleka"—Ryszard Rynkowski	Runners-up
Katarzyna & Tomasz	40 (10,10,10,10)	Cha-cha-cha	"O Pani!"—Grzegorz Hyży	Runners-up
Katarzyna & Tomasz	40 (10,10,10,10)	Freestyle	"Niech żyje bal"—Maryla Rodowicz	Runners-up
Beata & Jan	33 (8,9,8,8)	Foxtrot	"Kill Em with Kindness"—Selena Gomez	Winners
Beata & Jan	40 (10,10,10,10)	Contemporary	"Byle jak"—Margaret	Winners
Beata & Jan	39 (9,10,10,10)	Freestyle	"Tennessee"—Hans Zimmer from "Pearl Harbor"	Winners

Other Dances

Couple	Dance	Music

== Dance chart ==
The celebrities and professional partners danced one of these routines for each corresponding week:

- Week 1 (Season Premiere): Cha-cha-cha, Jive, Tango, Waltz
- Week 2 (My passion): One unlearned dance (introducing Foxtrot, Quickstep, Salsa, Paso Doble, Viennese Waltz, Jazz)
- Week 3 (Wedding Party): One unlearned dance (introducing Rumba)
- Week 4 (Polish Friday): One unlearned dance (introducing Samba, Argentine Tango)
- Week 5 (Hometown Glory): One unlearned dance (introducing Contemporary) and Disco Marathon
- Week 6 (The Crazy 90's): One unlearned dance and dance-offs
- Week 7 (Dedications Night): One unlearned dance and one repeated dance
- Week 8 (Romantic Places): One unlearned dance and one repeated dance
  Dariusz & Katarzyna and Katarzyna & Tomasz: One unlearned Latin dance & One unlearned Ballroom dance
- Week 9 (Semifinal: Judges' choice and Zbigniew Wodecki Tribute): Judges' choice, one repeated dance and dance offs
- Week 10 (Season Finale): Rivals' choice, couple's favorite dance of the season and Freestyle

Couple	1	2	3	4	5		6		7		8		9			10		
Beata & Jan	Cha-cha-cha	Foxtrot	Viennese Waltz	Samba	Rumba	Disco (Marathon)	Contemporary	Samba	Paso Doble	Foxtrot	Jive	Viennese Waltz	Argentine Tango	Cha-cha-cha	- (Immunity)	Foxtrot	Contemporary	Freestyle
Katarzyna & Tomasz	Jive	Cha-cha-cha	Quickstep	Samba	Contemporary	Disco (Marathon)	Foxtrot	Jive	Samba	Viennese Waltz	Tango	Rumba	Paso Doble	Foxtrot	Contemporary	Quickstep	Cha-cha-cha	Freestyle
Popek & Janja	Waltz	Cha-cha-cha	Rumba	Tango	Paso Doble	Disco (Marathon)	Viennese Waltz	Jive	Samba	Waltz	Cha-cha-cha	Contemporary	Jive	Viennese Waltz	Tango			Salsa
Dariusz & Katarzyna	Tango	Paso Doble	Cha-cha-cha	Rumba	Quickstep	Disco (Marathon)	Salsa	Cha-cha-cha	Foxtrot	Rumba	Samba	Argentine Tango						Salsa
Angelika & Rafał	Cha-cha-cha	Jazz	Quickstep	Argentine Tango	Samba	Disco (Marathon)	Jive	Samba	Tango	Cha-cha-cha								Salsa
Krzysztof & Valeriya	Tango	Paso Doble	Quickstep	Cha-cha-cha	Foxtrot	Disco (Marathon)	Salsa	Cha-cha-cha										Salsa
Renata & Michał	Waltz	Tango	Rumba	Foxtrot	Cha-cha-cha	Disco (Marathon)												Salsa
Martyna & Żora	Tango	Cha-cha-cha	Viennese Waltz	Rumba														Salsa
Wiktoria & Oskar	Jive	Viennese Waltz	Salsa															Salsa
Jarosław & Lenka	Cha-cha-cha	Salsa																Salsa
Antek & Agnieszka	Jive	Quickstep																Salsa

Highest scoring dance
Lowest scoring dance
Performed, but not scored
Bonus points
Gained bonus points for winning this dance-off
Gained no bonus points for losing this dance-off

== Call-out order ==
Order	Week 2	Week 3	Week 4	Week 5	Week 6	Week 7	Week 8	Week 9	Week 10
1	Katarzyna & Tomasz				Beata & Jan	Katarzyna & Tomasz	Popek & Janja	Beata & Jan	Beata & Jan
2	Angelika & Rafał				Angelika & Rafał	Dariusz & Katarzyna	Beata & Jan	Katarzyna & Tomasz	Katarzyna & Tomasz
3	Popek & Janja				Katarzyna & Tomasz	Beata & Jan	Katarzyna & Tomasz	Popek & Janja	
4	Wiktoria & Oskar				Popek & Janja	Popek & Janja	Dariusz & Katarzyna		
5	Krzysztof & Valeriya				Dariusz & Katarzyna	Angelika & Rafał			
6	Martyna & Żora			Dariusz & Katarzyna	Krzysztof & Valeriya				
7	Renata & Michał		Beata & Jan	Renata & Michał					
8	Beata & Jan	Renata & Michał	Martyna & Żora						
9	Dariusz & Katarzyna	Wiktoria & Oskar							
10	Jarosław & Lenka								
10	Antek & Agnieszka								

This couple came in first place with the judges.
This couple came in last place with the judges.
This couple came in last place with the judges and was eliminated.
This couple was eliminated.
This couple withdrew from the competition.
This couple was saved from elimination by immunity.
This couple won the competition.
This couple came in second in the competition.
This couple came in third in the competition.

== Guest performances ==
Date	Artist(s)	Song(s)	Dancers
2 March 2018	Tomasz Szymuś's Orchestra	"Just Dance"	All professional dancers, celebrities and judges
16 March 2018	Paweł Jasionowski	"Cudownych rodziców mam"	Martyna Kupczyk & Żora Korolyov
16 March 2018	Paweł Jasionowski	"Żono moja"	Krzysztof Gojdź & Valeriya Zhuravlyova
16 March 2018	Antek Smykiewicz	"Zawsze tam, gdzie ty"	Popek & Janja Lesar
23 March 2018	Gromee & Lukas Meijer	"Light Me Up"	Krzysztof Gojdź & Valeriya Zhuravlyova
23 March 2018	Michał Szpak	"Color of Your Life"	Dariusz Wieteska & Katarzyna Vu Manh
23 March 2018	Mateusz Ziółko	"W płomieniach"	Popek & Janja Lesar
23 March 2018	Enej	"Zagubiony"	Renata Kaczoruk & Michał Jeziorowski
23 March 2018	Anna Wyszkoni	"Mimochodem"	Martyna Kupczyk & Żora Korolyov
23 March 2018	Sound'n'Grace & Filip Lato	"100"	Beata Tadla & Jan Kliment
23 March 2018	Feel	"Swoje szczęście znam"	Angelika Mucha & Rafał Maserak
23 March 2018	Lanberry	"Piątek"	Katarzyna Dziurska & Tomasz Barański
23 March 2018	Lanberry & Feel	"Gotowi na wszystko"	Hanna Żudziewicz & Jacek Jeschke
6 April 2018	Marta Gałuszewska	"Nie mów mi nie"	Angelika Mucha & Rafał Maserak
13 April 2018	Tomasz Szymuś's Orchestra	"The Rhythm of the Night"	All professional dancers and celebrities
20 April 2018	Michał Wiśniewski	"A wszystko to... (bo ciebie kocham)"	Angelika Mucha & Rafał Maserak
20 April 2018	Kasia Stankiewicz	"Ruchome piaski"	Dariusz Wieteska & Katarzyna Vu Manh
27 April 2018	Pectus	"Barcelona"	Kamil Kuroczko & Sara Janicka
4 May 2018	Natalia Szroeder	"Z Tobą chcę oglądać świat"	-
11 May 2018	Tomasz Szymuś's Orchestra	"Despacito"	All professional dancers and celebrities
11 May 2018	Tomasz Szymuś's Orchestra	"Libertango"	All professional dancers
11 May 2018	Grzegorz Hyży	"O Pani!"	Katarzyna Dziurska & Tomasz Barański
11 May 2018	Margaret	"Byle jak"	Beata Tadla & Jan Kliment
11 May 2018	Sławomir Zapała i Magdalena Kajrowicz	"Miłość w Zakopanem"	-

== Rating figures ==
Date	Episode	Official rating 4+	Share 4+	Official rating 16–49	Share 16–49	Official rating 16–59	Share 16–59
2 March 2018	1	3 130 450	20.43%	882 139	15.45%	1 409 276	16.47%
9 March 2018	2	3 050 786	19.93%	1 034 866	17.90%	1 524 935	17.91%
16 March 2018	3	3 104 801	19.71%				
23 March 2018	4	2 637 679	16.53%				
6 April 2018	5	2 363 373	15.88%				
13 April 2018	6	2 351 841	16.86%				
20 April 2018	7	2 320 371	17.18%				
27 April 2018	8	2 328 269	16.63%				
4 May 2018	9	2 041 094	15.50%				
11 May 2018	10	2 549 063	19.50%	724 273	15.16%	1 121 261	15.85%
Average	Spring 2018	2 599 740	17.94%	739 539	13.93%	1 154 443	14.60%
