= Półmrok =

Studio album by Tulia
- Released: 21 May 2021
- Genre: Folk; alternative rock
- Length: 42:02
- Label: Universal
- Producer: Marcin Kindla

Tulia chronology
Tulia (2018)	Półmrok (2021)	Nim gwiazda zgaśnie (2021)

Singles from Półmrok
- 1. "Rzeka" Released: 22 November 2019; 2. "Burza" Released: 4 December 2020; 3. "Marcowy" Released: 19 March 2021; 4. "Przepięknie" Released: 21 May 2021; 5. "Narkotyk" Released: 13 August 2021

Półmrok is the second studio album by Polish folk band Tulia. It was released by Universal Music Polska on 21 May 2021.

Półmrok is a combination of folk and alternative rock, and was executive produced by Marcin Kindla. It spawned five singles "Rzeka", "Burza", "Marcowy", "Przepięknie" and "Narkotyk".

== Track listing ==
All tracks are written by Sonia Krasny and Nadia Dalin, except where noted. All tracks are produced by Marcin Kindla. Tracks 11 and 12 are all listed as bonus tracks.

Półmrok – Standard edition
No.	Title	Length
1.	"Marcowy"	3:04
2.	"Półmrok"	3:35
3.	"Burza"	4:18
4.	"Walcz"	4:27
5.	"Samotność"	2:28
6.	"Rzeka"	3:33
7.	"Narkotyk"	2:22
8.	"Czas"	3:03
9.	"Noc"	4:54
10.	"Przepięknie" (writer: Sonia Krasny, Patrycja Nowicka, Nadia Dalin)	3:35
11.	"Długość dźwięku samotności" (writer: Artur Rojek, Przemysław Myszor, Wojciech Powaga, Jacek Kuderski, Wojciech Kuderski)	3:53
12.	"Fire of Love (Pali się)" (writer: Sonia Krasny, Allan Rich, Jud Friedman, Nadia Dalin)	2:45
Total length:		42:02

== Release history ==
Release history for Półmrok
Region	Date	Format	Label	Ref.
Various	21 May 2021	CD; digital download; streaming	Universal	
