= List of number-one singles of 2018 (Poland) =

This is a list of the songs that reached number-one position in official Polish single chart in ZPAV in 2018.

== Chart history ==
Issue date	Song	Artist(s)	Reference(s)
January 6	"Wolves"	Selena Gomez and Marshmello	
January 13	"Wolves"	Selena Gomez and Marshmello	
January 20	"Wolves"	Selena Gomez and Marshmello	
January 27	"Anywhere"	Rita Ora	
February 3	"Beautiful Trauma"	Pink	
February 10	"Breathe"	Jax Jones featuring Ina Wroldsen	
February 17	"Crazy"	Lost Frequencies and Zonderling	
February 24	"Crazy"	Lost Frequencies and Zonderling	
March 3	"Gotowi na wszystko"	Feel and Lanberry	
March 10	"La Louze"	Shanguy	
March 17	"La Louze"	Shanguy	
March 24	"La Louze"	Shanguy	
March 31	"Light Me Up"	Gromee featuring Lukas Meijer	
April 7	"Light Me Up"	Gromee featuring Lukas Meijer	
April 14	"Light Me Up"	Gromee featuring Lukas Meijer	
April 21	"Light Me Up"	Gromee featuring Lukas Meijer	
April 28	"Wonderland"	C-BooL	
May 5	"Wonderland"	C-BooL	
May 12	"Wonderland"	C-BooL	
May 19	"Wonderland"	C-BooL	
May 26	"Wonderland"	C-BooL	
June 2	"Flames"	David Guetta and Sia	
June 9	"Flames"	David Guetta and Sia	
June 16	"One Kiss"	Calvin Harris and Dua Lipa	
June 23	"One Kiss"	Calvin Harris and Dua Lipa	
June 30	"Melody"	Lost Frequencies featuring James Blunt	
July 7	"One Kiss"	Calvin Harris and Dua Lipa	
July 14	"Solo"	Clean Bandit featuring Demi Lovato	
July 21	"Solo"	Clean Bandit featuring Demi Lovato	
July 28	"Małomiasteczkowy"	Dawid Podsiadło	
August 4	"Solo"	Clean Bandit featuring Demi Lovato	
August 11	"Małomiasteczkowy"	Dawid Podsiadło	
August 18	"King of the Jungle"	Shanguy	
August 25	"In My Mind"	Dynoro and Gigi D'Agostino	
September 1	"In My Mind"	Dynoro and Gigi D'Agostino	
September 8	"In My Mind"	Dynoro and Gigi D'Agostino	
September 15	"In My Mind"	Dynoro and Gigi D'Agostino	
September 22	"One Last Time"	Gromee featuring Jesper Jenset	
September 29	"Weź nie pytaj"	Paweł Domagała	
October 6	"Weź nie pytaj"	Paweł Domagała	
October 13	"Weź nie pytaj"	Paweł Domagała	
October 20	"Weź nie pytaj"	Paweł Domagała	
October 27	"Promises"	Calvin Harris and Sam Smith	
November 3	"Promises"	Calvin Harris and Sam Smith	
November 10	"Promises"	Calvin Harris and Sam Smith	
November 17	"Promises"	Calvin Harris and Sam Smith	
November 24	"Let You Love Me"	Rita Ora	
December 1	"Zakryj"	Sarsa	
December 8	"Let You Love Me"	Rita Ora	
December 15	"High Hopes"	Panic! at the Disco	
December 22	"Wystarczę ja"	Paweł Domagała	
December 29	"Wystarczę ja"	Paweł Domagała	

== Number-one artists ==
Position	Artist	Weeks at #1
1	Calvin Harris	7
2	Paweł Domagała	6
3	C-BooL	5
3	Gromee	5
4	Lukas Meijer (as featuring)	4
4	Shanguy	4
4	Dynoro	4
4	Gigi D'Agostino	4
4	Sam Smith	4
5	Selena Gomez	3
5	Marshmello	3
5	Lost Frequencies	3
5	Dua Lipa	3
5	Clean Bandit	3
5	Demi Lovato (as featuring)	3
5	Rita Ora	3
6	Zonderling	2
6	David Guetta	2
6	Sia	2
6	Dawid Podsiadło	2
7	Pink	1
7	Jax Jones	1
7	Ina Wroldsen (as featuring)	1
7	Feel	1
7	Lanberry	1
7	James Blunt (as featuring)	1
7	Jesper Jenset (as featuring)	1
7	Sarsa	1
7	Panic! at the Disco	1

== See also ==
- Polish Music Charts
- List of number-one albums of 2018 (Poland)
