= Taniec z gwiazdami season 20 =

Taniec z gwiazdami
- Season 20
- Hosted by: Krzysztof Ibisz; Paulina Sykut-Jeżyna
- Judges: Andrzej Grabowski; Iwona Pavlović; Beata Tyszkiewicz; Michał Malitowski
- Celebrity winner: Natalia Szroeder
- Professional winner: Jan Kliment
- No. of episodes: 10

Release
- Original network: Polsat
- Original release: 3 March – 12 May 2017

Season chronology
- ← Previous; Season 19 Next → Season 21

The 20th season of Taniec z gwiazdami, the Polish edition of Dancing With the Stars, started on 3 March 2017. This is the seventh season aired on Polsat. Krzysztof Ibisz and Paulina Sykut-Jeżyna returned as hosts and Beata Tyszkiewicz, Iwona Pavlović, Michał Malitowski and Andrzej Grabowski returned as judges.

On 12 May, Natalia Szroeder and her partner Jan Kliment were crowned the champions.

== Couples ==
Celebrity	Occupation	Professional partner	Status
Katarzyna Sawczuk	Actress, singer & The Voice of Poland runner-up	Wojciech Jeschke	Eliminated 1st on 3 March 2017
Robert Koszucki	Na dobre i na złe actor and Mister Poland 1997	Hanna Żudziewicz	Eliminated 2nd on 10 March 2017
Tomasz Zimoch	Journalist & sports commentator	Paulina Biernat	Eliminated 3rd on 17 March 2017
Paulina Chylewska	TVP presenter	Jacek Jeschke	Eliminated 4th on 24 March 2017
Mariusz Kałamaga	Comedian & radio-television presenter	Valeriya Zhuravlyova	Eliminated 5th on 31 March 2017
Monika Mariotti	Druga szansa actress	Rafał Maserak	Eliminated 6th on 7 April 2017
Michał Malinowski	Na Wspólnej and Pierwsza miłość actor	Agnieszka Kaczorowska	Eliminated 7th on 21 April 2017
Dominika Gwit	Film and television actress	Żora Korolyov †	Eliminated 8th on 28 April 2017
Marcin Korcz	Przyjaciółki actor	Wiktoria Omyła	Third place on 5 May 2017
Iwona Cichosz	Miss Deaf International 2016 and actress	Stefano Terrazzino	Runners-up on 12 May 2017
Natalia Szroeder	Singer and television presenter	Jan Kliment	Winners on 12 May 2017

== Scores ==
Couple	Place	1	2	3	4	5	6	7	8	9		10
Natalia & Jan	1	31	36	32	40†	37†	35+35=70	31+40=71	36+38=74†	35+37=72‡	+40=112‡	39+40+40=119†
Iwona & Stefano	2	33	38†	38†	30	36+2=38†	35+36=71	39+37=76†	40+33=73	35+40=75	—	37+37+40=114‡
Marcin & Wiktoria	3	36	35	32	30+3=33	36+1=37	38+36=74†	36+37=73	34+2+38=74†	36+40=76†	+40=116†	
Dominika & Żora	4	29	32	30	31	29	32+35=67	27+29=56‡	29+31=60‡			
Michał & Agnieszka	5	30	31	35	27‡	27+2=29	30+35=65‡	34+35=69				
Monika & Rafał	6	28	33	32	33	32	33+36=69					
Mariusz & Valeriya	7	29	35	25‡	32	25+1=26‡						
Paulina & Jacek	8	37†	28	29	37							
Tomasz & Paulina	9	25‡	19‡	28								
Robert & Hanna	10	32	26									
Katarzyna & Wojciech	11	29										

Red numbers indicate the lowest score for each week.
Green numbers indicate the highest score for each week.
indicates the couple eliminated that week.
indicates the returning couple that finished in the bottom two or three.
indicates the couple saved from elimination by immunity.
indicates the winning couple.
indicates the runner-up.
indicates the couple in third place.

== Average score chart ==
This table only counts for dances scored on a traditional 40-points scale.

Rank by average	Place	Couple	Total points	Number of dances	Average
1	1	Natalia & Jan	622	17	36.6
2	2	Iwona & Stefano	584	16	36.5
3	3	Marcin & Wiktoria	504	14	36.0
4	8	Paulina & Jacek	131	4	32.8
5	6	Monika & Rafał	227	7	32.4
6	5	Michał & Agnieszka	284	9	31.6
7	4	Dominika & Żora	334	11	30.4
8	7	Mariusz & Valeriya	146	5	29.2
9	10	Robert & Hanna	58	2	29.0
9	11	Katarzyna & Wojciech	29	1	29.0
11	9	Tomasz & Paulina	72	3	24.0

== Highest and lowest scoring performances ==
The best and worst performances in each dance according to the judges' 40-point scale are as follows:

Dance	Best dancer(s)	Highest score	Worst dancer(s)	Lowest score
Jive	Iwona Cichosz	40	Mariusz Kałamaga; Dominika Gwit	29
Tango	Natalia Szroeder	39	Monika Mariotti	28
Cha-cha-cha	Natalia Szroeder; Marcin Korcz	40	Robert Koszucki	26
Waltz	Paulina Chylewska	37	Tomasz Zimoch	25
Samba	Natalia Szroeder	40	Mariusz Kałamaga	25
Salsa	Natalia Szroeder	35	Tomasz Zimoch	19
Rumba	Iwona Cichosz	39	Tomasz Zimoch	28
Argentine Tango	Iwona Cichosz	38	Dominika Gwit	29
Quickstep	Natalia Szroeder; Marcin Korcz; Iwona Cichosz	37	Mariusz Kałamaga	25
Foxtrot	Natalia Szroeder	37	Dominika Gwit; Natalia Szroeder	31
Viennese Waltz	Paulina Chylewska	37	Dominika Gwit	29
Contemporary	Iwona Cichosz	40	Michał Malinowski	27
Charleston	Dominika Gwit	32		
Paso Doble	Marcin Korcz	40	Marcin Korcz	38
Team Dance	Iwona Cichosz; Marcin Korcz; Monika Mariotti	36	Natalia Szroeder; Dominika Gwit; Michał Malinowski	35
Musical	Natalia Szroeder	40	Iwona Cichosz	37
Freestyle	Natalia Szroeder; Iwona Cichosz	40		

== Couples' highest and lowest scoring dances ==
According to the traditional 40-point scale:

Couples	Highest scoring dance(s)	Lowest scoring dance(s)
Natalia & Jan	Cha-cha-cha (twice), Samba, Musical, Freestyle (40)	Jive, Foxtrot (31)
Iwona & Stefano	Contemporary, Jive, Freestyle (40)	Waltz (30)
Marcin & Wiktoria	Cha-cha-cha, Paso Doble (40)	Contemporary (30)
Dominika & Żora	Team Dance (35)	Cha-cha-cha (27)
Michał & Agnieszka	Viennese Waltz, Team Dance, Cha-cha-cha (35)	Cha-cha-cha, Contemporary (27)
Monika & Rafał	Team Dance (36)	Tango (28)
Mariusz & Valeriya	Argentine Tango (35)	Quickstep, Samba (25)
Paulina & Jacek	Waltz, Viennese Waltz (37)	Cha-cha-cha (28)
Tomasz & Paulina	Rumba (28)	Salsa (19)
Robert & Hanna	Tango (32)	Cha-cha-cha (26)
Katarzyna & Wojciech	Tango (29)	Tango (29)

== Weekly scores ==
Unless indicated otherwise, individual judges scores in the charts below (given in parentheses) are listed in this order from left to right: Iwona Pavlović, Andrzej Grabowski, Beata Tyszkiewicz and Michał Malitowski.

=== Week 1: Season Premiere ===
Running order

Couple	Score	Dance	Music	Result
Natalia & Jan	31 (7,9,8,7)	Jive	"Shake It Off"—Taylor Swift	Safe
Robert & Hanna	32 (8,9,10,5)	Tango	"Argentino Paso"—Carlos Ortega	Safe
Dominika & Żora	29 (6,9,9,5)	Cha-cha-cha	"Lovefool"—The Cardigans	Safe
Michał & Agnieszka	30 (6,9,9,6)	Jive	"Swing it"—Bus Stop	Safe
Paulina & Jacek	37 (10,10,10,7)	Waltz	"Imagine"—John Lennon	Safe
Mariusz & Valeriya	29 (5,9,9,6)	Jive	"Treat You Better"—Shawn Mendes	Safe
Iwona & Stefano	33 (7,10,9,7)	Cha-cha-cha	"Cake by the Ocean"—DNCE	Safe
Tomasz & Paulina	25 (3,8,10,4)	Waltz	"She"—Charles Aznavour	Safe
Katarzyna & Wojciech	29 (5,9,9,6)	Tango	"I Kissed a Girl"—Katy Perry	Eliminated
Marcin & Wiktoria	36 (9,10,9,8)	Cha-cha-cha	"Can't Feel My Face"—The Weeknd	Safe
Monika & Rafał	28 (5,9,9,5)	Tango	"Kriminaltango"—Kurt Feltz	Safe

=== Week 2: Latin Night ===
Running order

Couple	Score	Dance	Music	Result
Monika & Rafał	33 (7,10,9,7)	Samba	"Aquarela do Brasil"—Ary Barroso	Safe
Michał & Agnieszka	31 (6,9,9,7)	Salsa	"Conga"—Gloria Estefan	Safe
Iwona & Stefano	38 (10,9,10,9)	Rumba	"Samba Pa Ti"—Carlos Santana	Safe
Robert & Hanna	26 (4,8,8,6)	Cha-cha-cha	"Sofia"—Álvaro Soler	Eliminated
Dominika & Żora	32 (8,9,8,7)	Rumba	"Chan Chan"—Buena Vista Social Club	Safe
Marcin & Wiktoria	35 (7,10,10,8)	Argentine Tango	"Santa María (Del Buen Ayre)"—Gotan Project	Safe
Paulina & Jacek	28 (5,8,9,6)	Cha-cha-cha	"Waiting for Tonight"—Jennifer Lopez	Safe
Tomasz & Paulina	19 (1,6,8,4)	Salsa	"Danza Kuduro"—Don Omar featuring Lucenzo	Bottom two
Mariusz & Valeriya	35 (9,9,9,8)	Argentine Tango	"Passione"—Neffa	Safe
Natalia & Jan	36 (9,9,9,9)	Samba	"Livin' la Vida Loca"—Ricky Martin	Safe

=== Week 3: TV Night ===
Running order

Couple	Score	Dance	Music	TV series	Result
Marcin & Wiktoria	32 (7,9,9,7)	Jive	"I'll Be There for You"—The Rembrandts	Friends	Safe
Iwona & Stefano	38 (10,10,10,8)	Argentine Tango	"The X-Files"—Mark Snow	"The X-Files"	Safe
Mariusz & Valeriya	25 (5,8,8,4)	Quickstep	"Alternatywy 4"—Jerzy Matuszkiewicz	"Alternatywy 4"	Safe
Dominika & Żora	30 (6,9,8,7)	Salsa	"Cambio Dolor"—Natalia Oreiro	"Muñeca brava"	Safe
Natalia & Jan	32 (8,9,9,6)	Viennese Waltz	"With a Little Help from My Friends"—Joe Cocker	"The Wonder Years"	Safe
Tomasz & Paulina	28 (1,8,9,10)	Rumba	"07 zgłoś się"—Włodzimierz Korcz	"07 zgłoś się"	Eliminated
Monika & Rafał	32 (7,9,9,7)	Foxtrot	"Love and Marriage"—Frank Sinatra	"Married... with Children"	Bottom two
Paulina & Jacek	29 (4,10,10,5)	Salsa	"Sex and the City Theme"—Tom Findlay & Douglas J. Cuomo	"Sex and the City"	Safe
Michał & Agnieszka	35 (9,10,10,6)	Viennese Waltz	"Game of Thrones Theme"—Ramin Djawadi	"Game of Thrones"	Safe

=== Week 4: The Crazy 80's ===
Running order

Couple	Score	Dance	Music	Result
Michał & Agnieszka	27 (4,8,10,5)	Cha-cha-cha	"Celebration"—Kool & the Gang	Safe
Dominika & Żora	31 (8,8,8,7)	Foxtrot	"Careless Whisper"—Wham!	Safe
Natalia & Jan	40 (10,10,10,10)	Cha-cha-cha	"Bad"—Michael Jackson	Safe
Monika & Rafał	33 (7,9,9,8)	Rumba	"The Power of Love"—Jennifer Rush	Bottom two
Paulina & Jacek	37 (9,10,10,8)	Viennese Waltz	"Stop!"—Sam Brown	Eliminated
Mariusz & Valeriya	32 (8,9,9,6)	Cha-cha-cha	"I Want to Break Free"—Queen	Safe
Iwona & Stefano	30 (5,9,10,6)	Waltz	"Against All Odds (Take a Look at Me Now)"—Phil Collins	Safe
Marcin & Wiktoria	30 (6,8,8,8)	Contemporary	"Forever Young"—Alphaville	Safe
Marcin & Wiktoria; Natalia & Jan; Dominika & Żora; Michał & Agnieszka; Monika & Rafał; Mariusz & Valeriya; Iwona & Stefano; Paulina & Jacek	3 - - - - - - -	Jive (Maraton)	"I'm Still Standing"—Elton John	

=== Week 5: My Place on Earth ===
Running order

Couple	Score	Dance	Music	Result
Iwona & Stefano	36 (8,10,10,8)	Jive	"Do You Love Me"—The Contours	Safe
Marcin & Wiktoria	36 (9,9,10,8)	Foxtrot	"Sweet Dreams (Are Made of This)"—Eurythmics	Bottom two
Monika & Rafał	32 (7,9,9,7)	Cha-cha-cha	"Baila morena"—Zucchero	Safe
Michał & Agnieszka	27 (5,8,8,6)	Contemporary	"Beneath Your Beautiful"—Labrinth featuring Emeli Sandé	Safe
Natalia & Jan	37 (9,10,10,8)	Quickstep	"Satellite"—Lena Meyer-Landrut	Safe (Immunity)
Mariusz & Valeriya	25 (4,8,8,5)	Samba	"Mas que Nada"—Sérgio Mendes	Eliminated
Dominika & Żora	29 (6,8,8,7)	Argentine Tango	"Somebody That I Used to Know"—Gotye featuring Kimbra	Safe

Dance-offs
Couple	Judges votes	Dance	Music	Result
Iwona & Stefano	Iwona, Iwona, Iwona, Iwona	Rumba	"All of Me"—John Legend	Winner (2 pts)
Monika & Rafał	Iwona, Iwona, Iwona, Iwona	Rumba	"All of Me"—John Legend	Loser
Marcin & Wiktoria	Marcin, Mariusz, Marcin, Mariusz	Cha-cha-cha	"Moves like Jagger"—Maroon 5 featuring Christina Aguilera	Draw (1 pt)
Mariusz & Valeriya	Marcin, Mariusz, Marcin, Mariusz	Cha-cha-cha	"Moves like Jagger"—Maroon 5 featuring Christina Aguilera	Draw (1 pt)
Dominika & Żora	Michał, Michał, Dominika, Michał	Salsa	"Duele El Corazon"—Enrique Iglesias featuring Wisin	Loser
Michał & Agnieszka	Michał, Michał, Dominika, Michał	Salsa	"Duele El Corazon"—Enrique Iglesias featuring Wisin	Winner (2 pts)

=== Week 6: Circus Night ===
Running order

Couple	Score	Dance	Music	Result
Dominika & Żora	32 (8,9,9,6)	Charleston	"Bella Donna Twist"—Raphaël Beau	Bottom two
Natalia & Jan	35 (9,10,10,6)	Tango	"La cumparsita"—Gerardo Matos Rodríguez	Safe
Monika & Rafał	33 (6,10,9,8)	Quickstep	"Hollywood Wiz"— Guy Dubuc & Marc Lessard	Eliminated
Marcin & Wiktoria	38 (9,10,10,9)	Paso Doble	"Y Viva España"—Samantha	Safe
Iwona & Stefano	35 (10,10,10,5)	Samba	"Soul Bossa Nova"—Quincy Jones	Safe
Michał & Agnieszka	30 (5,9,10,6)	Tango	"Tickle Tango"—Simon Carpentier	Safe
Iwona & Stefano; Marcin & Wiktoria; Monika & Rafał	36 (8,10,10,8)	Freestyle (Team U Cioci na Imieninach)	"Przez twe oczy zielone"—Akcent	
Natalia & Jan; Dominika & Żora; Michał & Agnieszka	35 (9,8,9,9)	Freestyle (Team Paka z Trzepaka)	"...Baby One More Time"—Britney Spears	

=== Week 7: Disco Polo Night ===
Running order

Couple	Score	Dance	Music	Result
Marcin & Wiktoria	36 (8,10,10,8)	Cha-cha-cha	"Wymarzona"—MIG	Safe
Marcin & Wiktoria	37 (9,10,10,8)	Quickstep	"You Wanna Be Americano"—Lou Bega	Safe
Michał & Agnieszka	34 (8,10,10,6)	Foxtrot	"Oops!... I Did It Again"—Britney Spears	Eliminated
Michał & Agnieszka	35 (8,10,10,7)	Cha-cha-cha	"Jesteś szalona"—Boys	Eliminated
Dominika & Żora	27 (5,8,8,6)	Cha-cha-cha	"Ona jest taka cudowna"—Piękni i młodzi	Bottom two
Dominika & Żora	29 (6,8,8,7)	Viennese Waltz	"Like I'm Gonna Lose You"—Meghan Trainor feat. John Legend	Bottom two
Iwona & Stefano	39 (10,10,10,9)	Rumba	"Wicked Game"—Chris Isaak	Safe
Iwona & Stefano	37 (9,10,10,8)	Quickstep	"Żono moja"—Masters	Safe
Natalia & Jan	31 (7,9,8,7)	Foxtrot	"Ona tańczy dla mnie"—Weekend	Safe
Natalia & Jan	40 (10,10,10,10)	Samba	"Shape of You"—Ed Sheeran	Safe

=== Week 8: Dedications Night ===
Running order

Couple	Score	Dance	Music	Result
Natalia & Jan	36 (9,10,10,7)	Contemporary	"Fix You"—Coldplay	Bottom two
Natalia & Jan	38 (9,10,10,9)	Jive	"Lustra"—Natalia Szroeder	Bottom two
Iwona & Stefano	40 (10,10,10,10)	Contemporary	"Do kołyski"—Dżem	Safe
Iwona & Stefano	33 (8,9,9,7)	Cha-cha-cha	"This Girl"—Kungs vs. Cookin' on 3 Burners	Safe
Dominika & Żora	29 (6,8,8,7)	Jive	"Everybody Needs Somebody to Love"—John Belushi & Dan Aykroyd	Eliminated
Dominika & Żora	31 (7,8,8,8)	Salsa	"Locked Away"—Rock City ft. Adam Levine	Eliminated
Marcin & Wiktoria	34 (8,10,10,6)	Viennese Waltz	"Delilah"—Tom Jones	Safe
Marcin & Wiktoria	38 (9,10,10,9)	Tango	"Królowa łez"—Agnieszka Chylińska	Safe
Wiktoria; Iwona; Żora; Marcin; Jan; Natalia; Dominika; Stefano	2 - - - - - - -	Improvisation	"Rivers of Babylon"—Boney M. "Celebration"—Kool & the Gang	

=== Week 9: Trio Challenge (Semi-final) ===
Running order

Couple	Score	Dance	Music	Result
Iwona & Stefano (Emilia Cichosz)	35 (8,10,10,7)	Viennese Waltz	Soundtrack from Amélie	Safe
Iwona & Stefano (Emilia Cichosz)	40 (10,10,10,10)	Jive	"Ruda tańczy jak szalona"—Czadoman	Safe
Marcin & Wiktoria (Olga Korcz)	36 (8,10,10,8)	Samba	"Jedno niebo"—Bayer Full	Bottom two
Marcin & Wiktoria (Olga Korcz)	40 (10,10,10,10)	Cha-cha-cha	"Can't Stop the Feeling"—Justin Timberlake	Bottom two
Natalia & Jan (Staszek Szroeder)	35 (7,10,9,9)	Salsa	"Sorry"—Justin Bieber (Spanish Version)	Bottom two
Natalia & Jan (Staszek Szroeder)	37 (9,10,10,8)	Foxtrot	"Tańcz, tańcz, tańcz"—Long & Junior	Bottom two

Dance-off

Running order

Couple	Score	Dance	Music	Result
Marcin & Wiktoria	40 (10,10,10,10)	Paso Doble	"Y Viva España"—Samantha	Eliminated
Natalia & Jan	40 (10,10,10,10)	Cha-cha-cha	"Bad"—Michael Jackson	Safe

=== Week 10: Season Finale ===
Running order

Couple	Score	Dance	Music	Result
Natalia & Jan (Iwona Pavlović)	39 (10,10,10,9)	Tango	"La cumparsita"—Gerardo Matos Rodríguez	Winners
Natalia & Jan (Iwona Pavlović)	40 (10,10,10,10)	Musical	"Gimme! Gimme! Gimme! (A Man After Midnight)" "SOS" "Waterloo"—ABBA	Winners
Natalia & Jan (Iwona Pavlović)	40 (10,10,10,10)	Freestyle	Soundtrack from Avatar "I See You"—Leona Lewis	Winners
Iwona & Stefano (Michał Malitowski)	37 (10,10,8,9)	Samba	"Soul Bossa Nova"—Quincy Jones	Runners-up
Iwona & Stefano (Michał Malitowski)	37 (8,10,10,9)	Musical	"I Have a Dream" "Money, Money, Money" "Dancing Queen"—ABBA	Runners-up
Iwona & Stefano (Michał Malitowski)	40 (10,10,10,10)	Freestyle	"Now We Are Free" Soundtrack from Gladiator	Runners-up

Other Dances

Couple	Dance	Music
Katarzyna & Wojciech	Tango	"I Kissed a Girl"—Katy Perry
Robert & Hanna	Tango	"I Kissed a Girl"—Katy Perry
Monika & Rafał	Cha-cha-cha	"Baila morena"—Zucchero
Michał & Agnieszka	Cha-cha-cha	"Celebration"—Kool & the Gang
Tomasz & Paulina	Waltz	"She"—Charles Aznavour
Paulina & Jacek	Waltz	"She"—Charles Aznavour
Dominika & Żora	Salsa	"Cambio Dolor"—Natalia Oreiro
Mariusz & Valeriya	Jive	"Treat You Better"—Shawn Mendes
Marcin & Wiktoria	Jive	"Treat You Better"—Shawn Mendes

== Dance chart ==
The celebrities and professional partners danced one of these routines for each corresponding week:

- Week 1 (season Premiere): Cha-cha-cha, Waltz, Jive, Tango
- Week 2 (Latin Night): One unlearned dance (introducing Rumba, Samba, Argentine Tango, Salsa)
- Week 3 (TV Series' Themes Night): One unlearned dance (introducing Quickstep, Foxtrot, Viennese Waltz)
- Week 4 (Crazy 80's Night): One unlearned dance (introducing Contemporary) and Jive Marathon
- Week 5 (My Place on Earth): One unlearned dance and dance-offs
- Week 6 (Circus Night): One unlearned dance (introducing Paso Doble, Charleston) and Team Dance Freestyle
- Week 7 (Disco Polo Night): One unlearned dance and one repeated dance
- Week 8 (Dedications Night): One unlearned dance, improvised medley and one repeated dance
- Week 9 (Semi-final: Trio Challenge): One unlearned dance (trio dances), one repeated dance and dance-offs
- Week 10 (season Finale): Judges' choice, Musical dance from Mamma Mia and Freestyle

Couple	1	2	3	4		5		6		7		8			9			10		
Natalia & Jan	Jive	Samba	Viennese Waltz	Cha-cha-cha	Jive; Marathon	Quickstep	- (Immunity)	Tango	Freestyle (Team Paka z Trzepaka)	Foxtrot	Samba	Contemporary	Improvisation	Jive	Salsa	Foxtrot	Cha-cha-cha	Tango	Musical	Freestyle
Iwona & Stefano	Cha-cha-cha	Rumba	Argentine Tango	Waltz	Jive; Marathon	Jive	Rumba	Samba	Freestyle (Team U Cioci na Imieninach)	Rumba	Quickstep	Contemporary	Improvisation	Cha-cha-cha	Viennese Waltz	Jive	- (Immunity)	Samba	Musical	Freestyle
Marcin & Wiktoria	Cha-cha-cha	Argentine Tango	Jive	Contemporary	Jive; Marathon	Foxtrot	Cha-cha-cha	Paso Doble	Freestyle (Team U Cioci na Imieninach)	Cha-cha-cha	Quickstep	Viennese Waltz	Improvisation	Tango	Samba	Cha-cha-cha	Paso Doble			Jive
Dominika & Żora	Cha-cha-cha	Rumba	Salsa	Foxtrot	Jive; Marathon	Argentine Tango	Salsa	Charleston	Freestyle (Team Paka z Trzepaka)	Cha-cha-cha	Viennese Waltz	Jive	Improvisation	Salsa						Salsa
Michał & Agnieszka	Jive	Salsa	Viennese Waltz	Cha-cha-cha	Jive; Marathon	Contemporary	Salsa	Tango	Freestyle (Team Paka z Trzepaka)	Foxtrot	Cha-cha-cha									Cha-cha-cha
Monika & Rafał	Tango	Samba	Foxtrot	Rumba	Jive; Marathon	Cha-cha-cha	Rumba	Quickstep	Freestyle (Team U Cioci na Imieninach)											Cha-cha-cha
Mariusz & Valeriya	Jive	Argentine Tango	Quickstep	Cha-cha-cha	Jive; Marathon	Samba	Cha-cha-cha													Jive
Paulina & Jacek	Waltz	Cha-cha-cha	Salsa	Viennese Waltz	Jive; Marathon															Waltz
Tomasz & Paulina	Waltz	Salsa	Rumba																	Waltz
Robert & Hanna	Tango	Cha-cha-cha																		Tango
Katarzyna & Wojciech	Tango																			Tango

Highest scoring dance
Lowest scoring dance
Performed, but not scored
Bonus points
Gained bonus points for winning this dance-off
Gained no bonus points for losing this dance-off

== Call-out order ==
Order	Week 1 (Note: Week 1: Katarzyna & Wojciech were eliminated. The order of the other couples is based on the judges' scores.)	Week 2	Week 3	Week 4	Week 5	Week 6	Week 7	Week 8	Week 9	Week 10
1	Paulina & Jacek	Natalia & Jan	Michał & Agnieszka	Marcin & Wiktoria	Natalia & Jan	Iwona & Stefano	Iwona & Stefano	Iwona & Stefano	Iwona & Stefano	Natalia & Jan
2	Marcin & Wiktoria	Marcin & Wiktoria	Iwona & Stefano	Natalia & Jan	Dominika & Żora	Natalia & Jan	Natalia & Jan	Marcin & Wiktoria	Natalia & Jan	Iwona & Stefano
3	Iwona & Stefano	Iwona & Stefano	Natalia & Jan	Dominika & Żora	Monika & Rafał	Marcin & Wiktoria	Marcin & Wiktoria	Natalia & Jan	Marcin & Wiktoria	
4	Robert & Hanna	Mariusz & Valeriya	Paulina & Jacek	Michał & Agnieszka	Iwona & Stefano	Michał & Agnieszka	Dominika & Żora	Dominika & Żora		
5	Natalia & Jan	Monika & Rafał	Dominika & Żora	Mariusz & Valeriya	Michał & Agnieszka	Dominika & Żora	Michał & Agnieszka			
6	Michał & Agnieszka	Paulina & Jacek	Marcin & Wiktoria	Iwona & Stefano	Marcin & Wiktoria	Monika & Rafał				
7	Dominika & Żora	Dominika & Żora	Mariusz & Valeriya	Monika & Rafał	Mariusz & Valeriya					
8	Mariusz & Valeriya	Michał & Agnieszka	Monika & Rafał	Paulina & Jacek						
9	Monika & Rafał	Tomasz & Paulina	Tomasz & Paulina							
10	Tomasz & Paulina	Robert & Hanna								
11	Katarzyna & Wojciech									

This couple came in first place with the judges.
This couple came in last place with the judges.
This couple came in last place with the judges and was eliminated.
This couple was eliminated.
This couple withdrew from the competition.
This couple was saved from elimination by immunity.
This couple won the competition.
This couple came in second in the competition.
This couple came in third in the competition.

== Guest performances ==
Date	Artist(s)	Song(s)	Dancers
3 March 2017	Tomasz Szymuś's Orchestra	"Hold My Hand"	All professional dancers
10 March 2017	Tomasz Szymuś's Orchestra	"Tic Tic Tac"	All professional dancers and celebrities
10 March 2017	Rey Ceballo & Tripulacion Cubana	"Aquarela do Brasil"	Monika Mariotti & Rafał Maserak
10 March 2017	Rey Ceballo & Tripulacion Cubana	"Conga"	Michał Malinowski & Agnieszka Kaczorowska
10 March 2017	Rey Ceballo & Tripulacion Cubana	"Chan Chan"	Dominika Gwit & Żora Korolyov
10 March 2017	Rey Ceballo & Tripulacion Cubana	"Danza Kuduro"	Tomasz Zimoch & Paulina Biernat
10 March 2017	Rey Ceballo & Tripulacion Cubana	"Livin' la Vida Loca"	Natalia Szroeder & Jan Kliment
10 March 2017	Rey Ceballo & Tripulacion Cubana	"Quedate Con Todo"	—
10 March 2017	Patrycja Jopek	"Passione"	Mariusz Kałamaga & Valeriya Zhuravlyova
24 March 2017	Kasia Cerekwicka	"Stop!"	Paulina Chylewska & Jacek Jeschke
24 March 2017	Natalia Szroeder	"Forever Young"	Marcin Korcz & Wiktoria Omyła
7 April 2017	Julia from The Ocelot	"La cumparsita"	Natalia Szroeder & Jan Kliment
7 April 2017	Rafał Jonkisz with Acrobats	"Hollywood Wiz"	Monika Mariotti & Rafał Maserak
7 April 2017	Rafał Jonkisz with Acrobats	"Y Viva España"	Marcin Korcz & Wiktoria Omyła
7 April 2017	Rafał Jonkisz with Acrobats	"Soul Bossa Nova"	Iwona Cichosz & Stefano Terrazzino
7 April 2017	Ola and Mateusz from The Ocelot	"Tickle Tango"	Michał Malinowski & Agnieszka Kaczorowska
7 April 2017	Natalia Szroeder	"Zamienię Cię"	—
21 April 2017	Tomasz Szymuś's Orchestra	"Przez twe oczy zielone"	All professional dancers and celebrities
21 April 2017	M.I.G	"Wymarzona"	Marcin Korcz & Wiktoria Omyła
21 April 2017	Piękni i Młodzi	"Ona jest taka cudowna"	Dominika Gwit & Żora Korolyov
21 April 2017	Radosław Liszewski and Weekend	"Ona tańczy dla mnie"	Natalia Szroeder & Jan Kliment
21 April 2017	Marcin Miller and Boys	"Jesteś szalona"	Michał Malinowski & Agnieszka Kaczorowska
21 April 2017	Paweł Jasionowski and Masters	"Żono moja"	Iwona Cichosz & Stefano Terrazzino
28 April 2017	Artur Chamski and Marek Kaliszuk	"Safe and Sound"	All professional dancers and celebrities
5 May 2017	Bayer Full	"Jedno niebo"	Marcin Korcz & Wiktoria Omyła
5 May 2017	Czadoman	"Ruda tańczy jak szalona"	Iwona Cichosz & Stefano Terrazzino
5 May 2017	Long & Junior	"Tańcz, tańcz, tańcz"	Natalia Szroeder & Jan Kliment
5 May 2017	Tomasz Szymuś's Orchestra	"El Tango de Roxanne"	Hanna Żudziewicz, Jacek Jeschke & Wojciech Jeschke
5 May 2017	Doda	"Sens"	VOLT dance group
12 May 2017	Tomasz Szymuś's Orchestra	"Perdóname" "Hold My Hand"	All professional dancers and celebrities
12 May 2017	Tomasz Szymuś's Orchestra	"Dholi Taro Dhol Baaje"	Mohini Indian Dance Group
12 May 2017	Tomasz Szymuś's Orchestra	"Memory"	Musical "Cats"
12 May 2017	Tomasz Szymuś's Orchestra	"Slip Jig and Reel"	Treblers
12 May 2017	Tomasz Szymuś's Orchestra	"Libertango" "Love Is in the Air" "What Is Love" "I'm Ready for Love"	Janja Lesar & Jan Kliment, Paulina Biernat & Stefano Terrazzino, Wiktoria Omyła & Rafał Maserak

== Rating figures ==
Date	Episode	Official rating 4+	Share 4+	Official rating 16–49	Share 16–49	Official rating 16–59	Share 16–59
3 March 2017	1	2 286 955	15.33%	—N/a	—N/a	—N/a	—N/a
10 March 2017	2	2 371 369	15.85%	—N/a	—N/a	—N/a	—N/a
17 March 2017	3	2 598 483	17.24%	—N/a	—N/a	—N/a	—N/a
24 March 2017	4	2 568 147	17.55%	—N/a	—N/a	—N/a	—N/a
31 March 2017	5	2 749 566	19.10%	—N/a	—N/a	—N/a	—N/a
7 April 2017	6	2 444 888	15.98%	—N/a	—N/a	—N/a	—N/a
21 April 2017	7	3 207 466	20.62%	943 996	16.22%	1 473 530	17.03%
28 April 2017	8	2 886 073	18.58%	—N/a	—N/a	—N/a	—N/a
5 May 2017	9	2 626 691	18.25%	—N/a	—N/a	—N/a	—N/a
12 May 2017	10	2 885 999	20.94%	—N/a	—N/a	1 204 880	15.91%
Average	Spring 2017	2 657 187	17.91%	684 168	12.45%	1 152 697	13.86%
