= Tulia (given name) =

Tulia is a feminine given name. It may refer to the following people:

- Tulia Ackson, Deputy Speaker of the National Assembly of Tanzania
- Tulia Biczak, Polish singer and namesake of the musical group Tulia (band)
- Tulia Ciámpoli (1915–1981), Argentine actress, dancer, and violinist
- Tulia Medina (born 1983), Colombian weightlifter
