= Cool Me Down =

Cool Me Down may refer to:

- Cool Me Down (Margaret song), a 2016 single by Polish singer Margaret
- Cool Me Down (Gromee and Inna song), 2021 single by Gromee and Inna
