= List of number-one albums of 2018 (Poland) =

This is a list of number-one albums of 2018 in Poland, per the OLiS chart.

== Chart history ==
Issue date	Album	Artist(s)	Reference
January 4	Christmas	Michael Bublé	
January 11	Bravo Hits: Zima 2018	Various artists	
January 18	Bravo Hits: Zima 2018	Various artists	
January 25	Smooth Jazz Cafe 17	Various artists	
February 1	Smooth Jazz Cafe 17	Various artists	
February 8	Postanawia umrzeć	Bonson	
February 15	Empik prezentuje: Best Love Songs	Various artists	
February 22	The Greatest Hits	Sławomir	
March 1	Wiedza o społeczeństwie	Lao Che	
March 8	W drodze po szczęście	O.S.T.R.	
March 15	W drodze po szczęście	O.S.T.R.	
March 22	W drodze po szczęście	O.S.T.R.	
March 29	Ground Zero Mixtape	PRO8L3M	
April 5	To tu	KęKę	
April 12	To tu	KęKę	
April 19	To tu	KęKę	
April 26	Soma 0,5 mg	Taconafide	
May 10	V8T	Kali and Flvwlxss	
May 17	Soma 0,5 mg	Taconafide	
May 24	Mołotow	Borixon	
May 31	Proverbium	Małach	
June 7	Dobrze, że jesteś	Zbigniew Wodecki	
June 14	Evolve	Imagine Dragons	
June 21	Evil_Things	Guzior	
June 28	Mej duszy dziecko	Hinol Polska Wersja	
July 5	1976: A Space Odyssey	Zbigniew Wodecki and Mitch & Mitch	
July 12	BOA	ReTo	
July 19	Blue & Lonesome	The Rolling Stones	
July 26	Café Belga	Taco Hemingway	
August 2	Café Belga	Taco Hemingway	
August 9	I Will Always Love You: The Best of Whitney Houston	Whitney Houston	
August 16	I Will Always Love You: The Best of Whitney Houston	Whitney Houston	
August 23	I Will Always Love You: The Best of Whitney Houston	Whitney Houston	
August 30	Sweetener	Ariana Grande	
September 6	You Want It Darker	Leonard Cohen	
September 13	Wszystko co złe	Sarius	
September 20	Dreamer	Michał Szpak	
September 27	Maleńczuk gra Młynarskiego	Maciej Maleńczuk	
October 4	Mini dom	Kortez	
October 11	Wasteland	Riverside	
October 18	Mutylator	Słoń	
October 25	Basta	Nosowska	
November 1	Małomiasteczkowy	Dawid Podsiadło	
November 8	Małomiasteczkowy	Dawid Podsiadło	
November 15	Małomiasteczkowy	Dawid Podsiadło	
November 22	Małomiasteczkowy	Dawid Podsiadło	
November 29	1984	Paweł Domagała	
December 6	Trapstar	Young Multi	
December 13	Kwiat polskiej młodzieży	Bedoes and Kubi Producent	
December 20	Czerwony dywan	Paluch	

== See also ==
- List of number-one singles of 2018 (Poland)
