= It Don't Matter =

2021 single by Alok, Sofi Tukker and Inna

Single by Alok, Sofi Tukker and Inna
- Released: 7 May 2021
- Genre: Deep house
- Length: 2:53
- Label: Controversia
- Songwriters: Nick Audino; Charlotte Bühler; Sophie Hawley; Lewis Hughes; OHYES; Alok Achkar Peres Petrillo
- Producers: Alok; Lewis Hughes; OHYES; Sofi Tukker

Alok singles chronology
"Another You" (2021)	"It Don't Matter" (2021)	"My Head (Can't Get You Out)" (2021)

Sofi Tukker singles chronology
"Spa" (2020)	"It Don't Matter" (2021)	"Mon Cheri" (2021)

Inna singles chronology
"Cool Me Down" (2021)	"It Don't Matter" (2021)	"Maza" (2021)

Lyric video
- "It Don't Matter" on YouTube

"It Don't Matter" is a song by Brazilian DJ Alok, American house music DJ duo Sofi Tukker and Romanian singer Inna. It was released as an exclusively streamable Spotify Single on 7 May 2021 by Controversia. The track was written by Nick Audino, Charlotte Bühler, Sofi Tukker's Sophie Hawley, Lewis Hughes, OHYES and Alok, while the production was handled by Alok alongside Hughes, OHYES and Sofi Tukker. Musically, "It Don't Matter" has been described as a deep house song by music critics and talks about having thoughts of a special someone regardless of that person's distance. Aided by a lyric video uploaded to YouTube simultaneously with the track's release, "It Don't Matter" reached number 27 on Billboard's US Dance/Electronic Songs chart, as well as the top five in the Commonwealth of Independent States (CIS), Hungary, Russia and Poland. It received a gold certification in the latter country and a platinum one in Brazil.

== Background and composition ==
"It Don't Matter" was written by Nick Audino, Charlotte Bühler, Sofi Tukker's Sophie Hawley, Lewis Hughes, OHYES and Alok―credited under his real name Alok Achkar Peres Petrillo―while the production was handled by Alok, Hughes, OHYES and Sofi Tukker. It was exclusively released for streaming on Spotify as a Spotify Single on 7 May 2021 by Controversia, a Spinnin' Records imprint owned by Alok. Upon premiere, the song was included on various million-follower playlists on the platform, most notably Mint―the largest electronic music playlist―New Music Friday, Dance Paradise and Girls' Might. A remix of "It Don't Matter" made by Ekanta Jake, Alok's mother, was issued the day before the original track's release by Controversia. "It Don't Matter" was eventually released on digital platforms other than Spotify in November 2021.

Musically, "It Don't Matter" is a bass-driven deep house song about having thoughts of a special someone regardless of that person's distance. While Kaido Strange of Mxdwn Music opined that the track could be about the artists' fans, We Rave You's Lilla Vásárhelyi praised the song's catchiness and noticed a "haunting and electrifying melody that will strike an emotional chord after every listening". Alex Ștefănescu, writing for InfoMusic, thought that "It Don't Matter" was "rhythmic, but somewhat discreet and soft". The song's lyrics in the refrain include: "It don't matter where I go, it don't matter where I'll be / 'Cause you're always in my head like a song I can't forget".

== Promotion and commercial performance ==
An accompanying lyric video for "It Don't Matter" was uploaded to Alok's YouTube channel on 7 May 2021, having been edited by Sergio Twardowski and featuring motion lyrics programmed by Brandon Ventura. The clip also includes footage of the artists travelling around the world for concerts prior to the COVID-19 pandemic, prompting Strange to notice their "joy ... of touring and performing for people". For further promotion, Inna performed the track live during her Summer Live Sessions series on YouTube on 17 August 2021, and at the 2021 Untold Festival with Alok in October 2021.

Upon release, "It Don't Matter" debuted and peaked at number 27 on Billboard's US Dance/Electronic Songs chart with 509,000 first-week domestic streams. It served as Alok's third, Sofi Tukker's eighth and Inna's first entry on the ranking; the song is the latter's first to enter a dance Billboard chart since her 2010 single "Sun Is Up" had peaked at number four on the publication's Dance/Mix Show Airplay ranking. Later in 2021, "It Don't Matter" further reached number three in Poland, as well as numbers two and five in Russia and the Commonwealth of Independent States (CIS), respectively. The song was certified platinum in Brazil and in Poland.

== Track listing ==
Digital download / streaming
No.	Title	Length
1.	"It Don't Matter"	2:53
2.	"It Don't Matter" (Ekanta Jake remix)	2:26
3.	"It Don't Matter" (Extended Mix)	3:52

== Charts ==
=== Weekly charts ===
Weekly chart performance for "It Don't Matter"
Chart (2021–2023)	Peak position
Belarus Airplay (TopHit)	79
CIS Airplay (TopHit)	4
Hungary (Single Top 40)	5
Kazakhstan Airplay (TopHit)	36
Lithuania Airplay (TopHit)	88
Moldova Airplay (TopHit)	59
Poland (Polish Airplay Top 100)	3
Russia Airplay (TopHit)	2
Ukraine Airplay (TopHit)	12
US Hot Dance/Electronic Songs (Billboard)	27

=== Monthly charts ===
Monthly chart performance for "It Don't Matter"
Chart (2021)	Peak position
CIS (TopHit)	7
Russia Airplay (TopHit)	5

=== Year-end charts ===
2021 year-end chart performance for "It Don't Matter"
Chart (2021)	Position
CIS (TopHit)	23
Poland (ZPAV)	24
Russia Airplay (TopHit)	14

2022 year-end chart performance for "It Don't Matter"
Chart (2022)	Position
Russia Airplay (TopHit)	31
Ukraine Airplay (TopHit)	28

2023 year-end chart performance for "It Don't Matter"
Chart (2023)	Position
Belarus Airplay (TopHit)	119
Ukraine Airplay (TopHit)	88

2024 year-end chart performance for "It Don't Matter"
Chart (2024)	Peak position
Belarus Airplay (TopHit)	152

2025 year-end chart performance for "It Don't Matter"
Chart (2025)	Peak position
Belarus Airplay (TopHit)	142

== Certifications ==
Certifications for "It Don't Matter"
Region	Certification	Certified units/sales
Brazil (Pro-Música Brasil)	Platinum	80,000^{‡}
Poland (ZPAV)	Platinum	50,000^{‡}
^{‡} Sales+streaming figures based on certification alone.

== See also ==
- List of music released by Romanian artists that has charted in major music markets
