= Bayer Full =

Bayer Full is one of the most popular disco polo bands from Poland. It was founded in 1984 by Sławomir Świerzyński. As of 2013, they have sold 16.5 million records since their inception.

== Meaning of the name ==
The name of the group is slang expression and could be translated as "tommyrot" or "poppycock".

== Discography ==
- 'Blondyneczka' – 'Little Blonde' – 1992
- 'Wakacyjna Dziewczyna' – 'Holiday Girl' – 1993
- 'Kolorowe Oczy' – 'Colourful Eyes – 1994
- 'Legenda Bayer Full' – The collection of 5 radio cassettes – 1998
- 'Od Biesiady do Wesela – Wiatr Miłości' – "From Feast to Wedding – The Wind of Love' – 1998
- 'Biesiada Turystyczna – Gdzie ta Keja' – "Tourist Feast – Where's The Quayside' 1999
- 'Bayer Full – czyste melodyjne brzmienie 1984 – 1999' – "Bayer Full – Pure Melodious Sound 1984 – 1999' – 2000
- 'Album Weselny' – 'The Wedding Album' – 2000
- 'Album Świąteczny' – 'The Christmas Album' – 2000
- 'Przeboje dancingowe – pierwsza godzina zabawy' – 'Dancing-party Hits – The First Hour of Fun' – 2001
- 'Ty Polsko wiesz' – 'You, Poland, Know" – 2002
- 'Złote przeboje 1994 – 2005 – 20 lat biesiady Bayer Full' – 'Goldies 1994–2005 – 20 Years of Bayer Full's Feast' – 2005
- 'Baw się razem z nami' – 'Play With Us' – 2006

=== Singles ===
- 'Majteczki w kropeczki' – 'Polka Dot Panties'
- 'Blondyneczka' – 'Little Blonde Girl' - based on the melody of Soleado
- 'Moja muzyka' – 'My Music'

== Controversy ==
In 2010, a Polish news correspondent living in China named Krzysztof Darewicz intended promoting Polish music at the Expo 2010 held in Shanghai, China. Darewicz was approached by Bayer Full's frontman Sławomir Świerzyński, who convinced him to partner with Bayer Full. Darewicz was originally against the idea, stating that since the disco polo genre had been considered dated in Poland by the time of this engagement, he wanted to contract a young boy band instead. Nevertheless, Darewicz agreed to write Chinese language versions of some of Bayer Full's songs, and adapt them to the Chinese market. These songs were used as promotional materials for Chinese television networks, and for Bayer Full's concerts, but were never released as an album. Before even departing to China, Świerzyński began speaking about the band's ventures to the Polish media, claiming that the band had received an order for 67 million records, which was proven to be false. Shortly after the band's trip to China, they performed a concert in Wólka Kosowska for a delegation from the Chinese embassy in Poland, but were found to be lip-syncing their songs' Chinese lyrics.

The following year, Bayer Full released their Chinese language recordings as an album to be sold in Poland, and did not credit Darewicz in any way. Świerzyński denied that an album was released, instead suggesting the band simply partnered with a Polish website to release the songs as MP3 files, which the involved website denied. In 2013, another eight Chinese language songs were released as MP3 files by the Polish firm Empik, again without crediting Darewicz. Świerzyński denied that the band signed a contract with Empik, which Empik disputed.

In a January 2013 interview with the Polish newspaper Polska Metropolia Warszawska, Świerzyński disputed Darewicz's account of events, claiming instead that after he left a couple of CDs at a hotel in Hong Kong, a Chinese radio producer found the CDs and requested the band come to China perform in Chinese. Świerzyński claims that after a failed attempt to write and perform Polish language versions of various Chinese songs, he personally worked on translating the band's songs into Chinese for an entire year. He reported that he was treated like "the Tsar's child" in China. He also claimed that the reason why Bayer Full had not been invited to the National Festival of Polish Song in Opole and the Sopot International Song Festival was due to the organizers were "afraid" that the band would overshadow others.

In March 2021, Krzysztof Darewicz vowed to sue the band, claiming authorship over their Chinese language songs. Świerzyński disputes this, stating that Darewicz merely translated the songs, and cannot claim authorship. However, Darewicz claims that the songs were not merely translated, but further adapted to suit Chinese audiences, enabling him to claim authorship of the songs.
