= Tulia (band) =

Polish band

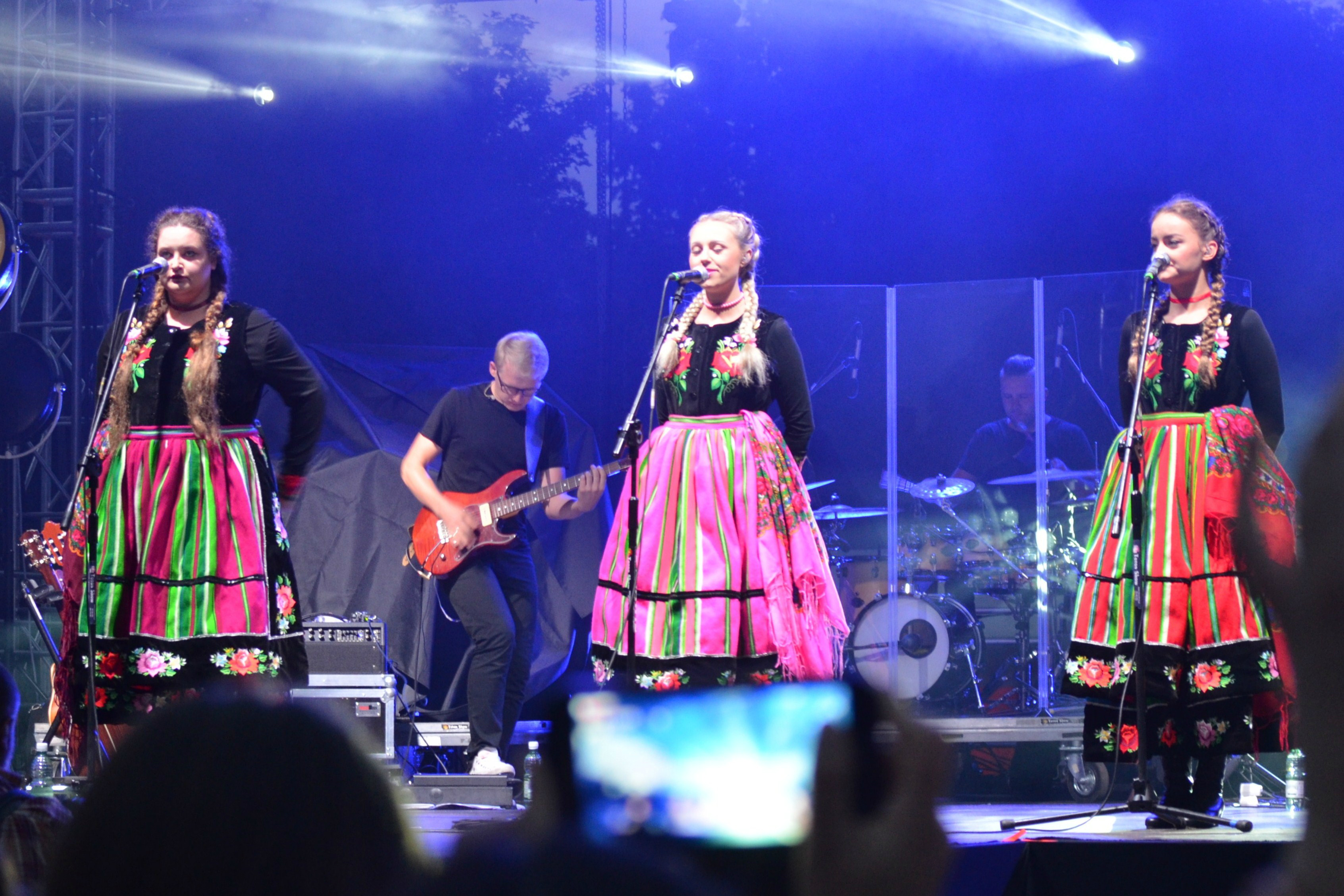
- Tulia in 2018

Background information
- Origin: Szczecin, Poland
- Genre: Folk
- Years active: 2017–present
- Label: Universal Music Poland
- Members: Dominika Siepka; Patrycja Nowicka; Tulia Białobrzeska
- Past members: Joanna Sinkiewicz

Tulia is a Polish folk music group. The band was formed in 2017, in Szczecin, Poland. There are three singers in the band: Dominika Siepka, Patrycja Nowicka and Tulia Białobrzeska née Biczak, whose name was chosen as the name of the band. They received major attention in Poland in 2017, after sharing a cover of Depeche Mode's song "Enjoy the Silence" on YouTube.

The group use the white voice singing technique.

== Career ==
In 2017 they recorded and uploaded their own version of Enjoy the Silence by Depeche Mode which in the same month was published on the band's fanpage. In November 2017, in Szczecin, Tulia band was officially formed.

In February 2018, they realised an official video to the song. It scored over 11 million views on YouTube. In the same month they presented a video clip to their cover of "Nieznajomy" by Dawid Podsiadło.

On 25 May 2018, they released their first album, called Tulia and distributed by Universal Music Poland, which includes a number of original songs, as well as covers of Polish and international artists. The album went platinum in Poland, selling more than 30,000 copies from the date of release.

On 9 June 2018, they performed their song "Jeszcze Cię nie ma" at 55. Krajowy Festiwal Piosenki Polskiej w Opolu. They received three statuettes: judges' prize, public's prize and a special prize from ZAiKS.

On 16 November 2018, Tulia (deluxe edition) was released in which their new original songs were added.

== Eurovision Song Contest 2019 ==
On 15 February 2019, it was announced that Tulia had been chosen by Polish public TV broadcaster TVP to represent Poland in the Eurovision Song Contest 2019. The selected song was Fire of Love (Pali się). Before the contest they took part in several promoting parties.

On 14 May 2019, they performed in the first semi-final and placed 11th with 120 points, missing the final by 2 points.

== Members ==
Tulia Białobrzeska née Biczak (born 16 June 1993) is the oldest member of the band. She studied culture. The group was named after her since it was her idea to cover Enjoy the Silence by Depeche Mode which eventually gained them recognition.

Dominika Siepka (born 13 June 1995) studied pre-school and early-school education. Apart from singing, she is a teacher.

Patrycja Nowicka (born 28 March 1998) graduated from music school. Concentrated mostly on singing, she sometimes plays violin during live performances.

Joanna Sinkiewicz (born 2 August 1998) studies cosmetology and classical music. She left the group in August 2019 due to personal issues.

== Discography ==
=== Albums ===
Title	Details	Peak chart positions	Sales	Certifications
Title	Details	POL	Sales	Certifications
Tulia	Released: 25 May 2018; Label: Universal Music Polska; Format: CD, LP, digital download, streaming	7	POL: 30,000	POL: Platinum
Półmrok	Released: 21 May 2021; Label: Universal Music Polska; Formats: CD, digital download, streaming	—		
Nim gwiazda zgaśnie	Released: 26 November 2021; Label: Universal Music Polska; Formats: CD, digital download, streaming	—		
"—" denotes a recording that did not chart or was not released in that territory.

=== Singles ===
Title	Year	Album
"Enjoy the Silence"	2017	Tulia
"Nieznajomy"	2018	Tulia
"Jeszcze Cię nie ma"	2018	Tulia
"Wstajemy już"	2018	Tulia
"Pali się"	2018	Tulia
"Fire of Love (Pali się)"	2019	Non-album single
"Trawnik" (featuring Kasia Kowalska)	2019	Tulia
"Rzeka"	2019	Półmrok
"Burza"	2020	Półmrok
"Marcowy"	2021	Półmrok
"Przepięknie"	2021	Półmrok
"Narkotyk"	2021	Półmrok
"Nim gwiazda zgaśnie"	2021	Nim gwiazda zgaśnie
"Przerwany" (with Halina Mlynkova)	2023	Non-album singles
"Ćmy" (with Pectus)	2023	Non-album singles

=== As featured artist ===
Title	Year	Peak chart positions		Certifications	Album
Title	Year	POL Streaming	POL Songs	Certifications	Album
"Pusty pokój, ale płyty diamentowe" (Kubi Producent featuring Szpaku and Tulia)	2024	15	15	ZPAV: Gold	Sen, którego nigdy nie miałem
"Jagódki" (Vixen featuring Tulia)	2024	—	—		Non-album single
"—" denotes a recording that did not chart or was not released in that territory.

=== Promotional singles ===
Title	Year	Album
"Długość dźwięku samotności"	2019	Półmrok
"Czerwone korale"	2023	Non-album singles
"Kołysanka o niedoli"	2026	Non-album singles

=== Guest appearances ===
Title	Year	Other artist(s)	Album
"Dwa miasta"	2019	Pectus	Kobiety/Wojciech Młynarski
"Przed snem"	2024	Various artists	Lipcowe'45
"W drzwiach"	2024	Various artists	Lipcowe'45

== Awards ==
- Fryderyk 2019 for New Face of Fonography

Awards and achievements
Preceded by Gromee feat. Lukas Meijer with "Light Me Up"	Poland in the Eurovision Song Contest; 2019	Succeeded by Alicja with "Empires"
