= Cool Me Down (Gromee and Inna song) =

2021 single by Gromee and Inna

Single by Gromee and Inna

from the album Tiny Sparks
- Released: 23 April 2021
- Genre: Dance
- Length: 2:43
- Label: Sony
- Songwriters: Nicholas Audino; Andrzej Gromala; Moa Hammar; Lewis Hughes; Cassandra Ströberg; Te Whiti Warbrick

Gromee singles chronology
"Worth It" (2020)	"Cool Me Down" (2021)	"Talk to Me" (2021)

Inna singles chronology
"Flashbacks" (2020)	"Cool Me Down" (2021)	"It Don't Matter" (2021)

Music video
- "Cool Me Down" on YouTube

"Cool Me Down" is a song by Polish disc jockey Gromee and Romanian singer Inna, released on 23 April 2021 for digital download and streaming as a single by Sony Music Entertainment Poland. Included on Gromee's extended play (EP) Tiny Sparks (2022), it was written by Nicholas Audino, Gromee, Moa Hammar, Lewis Hughes, Cassandra Ströberg and Te Whiti Warbrick. A dance track that a few music critics praised for its catchiness, the song lyrically speaks about the passion between two lovers. "Cool Me Down" was a moderate commercial success, achieving its highest peak in Poland, at number two on the Polish Airplay Top 100. For promotion, a music video was uploaded to Gromee's YouTube channel simultaneously with the song's release, and it was also performed live at the RMF FM i Polsatu event in August 2021.

== Background and release ==
Gromee had been a fan of Inna's for a long time, and sent her a demo of "Cool Me Down", desiring to collaborate with her. She liked it and work on the song was supposed to be done at Gromee's studio in Kraków, Poland, however due to the COVID-19 pandemic, the track was completed online via file exchange. Initially, Gromee was dissatisfied with Inna's vocals, prompting her to poke fun at the fact that he made her record the song several times during an interview. "Cool Me Down" was written by Nicholas Audino, Gromee under his real name of Andrzej Gromala, Moa Hammar, Lewis Hughes, Cassandra Ströberg and Te Whiti Warbrick, and was released for digital download and streaming as a single in various countries on 23 April 2021 by Sony Music Entertainment Poland. Both Gromee and Inna had previously teased the song's release and its cover on their social media accounts to positive reactions.

== Composition and reception ==
Jonathan Vautrey, writing for Wiwibloggs, stated that Gromee "deliver[ed] a catchy dance track that Inna adds her flair to"; he further identified "Cool Me Down" to be about the "fiery passion" between two lovers, citing lyrics such as "'Cause when we get too close / It's like the room is set on fire, on fire" and "Don't tryna cool me down / Oh, na na na / I need another round". While an editor of RMF FM observed how "Cool Me Down" has a "mesmerizing refrain" and that it was destined to become a summer hit, InfoMusic's Raluca Chirilă noticed the song "fits perfectly on a holiday playlist" with its "dynamic beats and [...] club vibe". Commercially, the song was a moderate success, peaking at numbers two, 12 and 147 on radio airplay rankings in Poland, the Czech Republic and the Commonwealth of Independent States (CIS), respectively.

== Music video and promotion ==
An accompanying music video was uploaded to Gromee's YouTube channel on 23 April 2021, and was directed by Maciej Zdrojewski, who also served as the director of photography. Other involvements were Moon Films and Loops Productions as the production companies, ATM as providers for the camera equipment, Magda Betlejewska as the executive producer, Piotr Fryta Kornobis as the production manager, Monika Mierzejewska as the production assistant, Adam Jedynak as the focus puller, Mariusz Pieńkoś as the gaffer and heliographer, Aleksandra Przyłuska as the make-up artist, and Yellowoz and Filip as the stagehands. The visual portrays Inna singing to the song, wearing black and silver outfits while interspersed shots of Gromee are also shown. For further promotion, Inna performed the track during her Summer Live Sessions series on YouTube, and with Gromee for the RMF FM i Polsatu event, both in August 2021.

== Track listing ==
- Digital download and streaming
1. "Cool Me Down" (Extended Version) – 3:46
2. "Cool Me Down" – 2:43

== Charts ==
=== Weekly charts ===
Weekly chart performance for "Cool Me Down"
Chart (2021)	Peak position
CIS Airplay (TopHit)	147
Czech Republic Airplay (ČNS IFPI)	12
Poland Airplay (ZPAV)	2

=== Year-end charts ===
2021 year-end chart performance for "Cool Me Down"
Chart (2021)	Position
Poland (ZPAV)	33

== Certifications ==
Certifications for "Cool Me Down"
Region	Certification	Certified units/sales
Poland (ZPAV)	Gold	25,000^{‡}
^{‡} Sales+streaming figures based on certification alone.

== Release history ==
Release dates and formats for "Cool Me Down"
Country	Date	Format(s)	Label	Ref.
Various	23 April 2021	Digital download; streaming	Sony	
