= Tulia (album) =

Studio album by Tulia
- Released: 25 May 2018
- Genres: Folk; alternative rock
- Label: Universal Music Polska

Singles from Tulia
- 1. "Enjoy the Silence" Released: 2017; 2. "Nieznajomy" Released: 30 March 2018; 3. "Jeszcze Cię nie ma" Released: 20 April 2018; 4. "Wstajemy już" Released: 2018; 5. "Pali się" Released: 2018

Tulia is the debut studio album by Polish folk band Tulia. The album was released in May 2018 and re-released in November 2018. The album peaked at number 7 on the Polish charts and has been certified platinum.

== Track listing ==
No.	Title	Writer(s)	Length
1.	"Nieznajomy"	Bogdan Kondracki, Dawid Podsiadło	4:29
2.	"Eli Lama Sabachtani"	Robert Gawliński	3:43
3.	"Nie Pytaj O Polskę"	Grzegorz Ciechowski	4:03
4.	"Jeszcze Cię Nie Ma"		3:32
5.	"Kiedy Powiem Sobie Dość"	Agnieszka Chylińska, Grzegorz Skawiński	5:20
6.	"Wstajemy Już"		3:01
7.	"Nigdy Więcej Nie Tańcz Ze Mną"	Ania Dąbrowska	2:56
8.	"To Nie Ptak"	Kayah, Goran Bregović	4:22
9.	"To Wychowanie"		2:59
10.	"Uciekaj Moje Serce"	Agnieszka Osiecka, Seweryn Krajewski	4:14
11.	"Krakowski Spleen"	Olga Jackowska	5:16

Special Edition
No.	Title	Writer(s)	Length
12.	"Jaskółka Uwięziona"		6:13
13.	"Enjoy the Silence"	Martin Gore	4:27
14.	"Nothing Else Matters"		4:48
15.	"Zazdrość"		1:10

Deluxe Edition
No.	Title	Length
16.	"Trawnik" (featuring Kasia Kowalska)	3:07
17.	"Nie Zabieraj"	3:12
18.	"Pali się"	2:51
19.	"Dreszcze"	2:31
20.	"Nasza Kolysanka" (featuring Marcin Wyrostek)	4:06

== Charts ==
Chart (2018)	Peak position
Poland Oficjalna Lista Sprzedaży	7

== Release history ==
Region	Date	Format	Edition(s)	Label	Catalogue
Worldwide	25 May 2018	CD; digital download; streaming; LP	Standard	Universal Music Polska	677180
Worldwide	25 May 2018	CD; digital download; streaming; LP	Special Edition	Universal Music Polska	675926
Worldwide	9 November 2018	CD; digital download; streaming; LP	Deluxe Edition	Universal Music Polska	772079
