= Gromee =

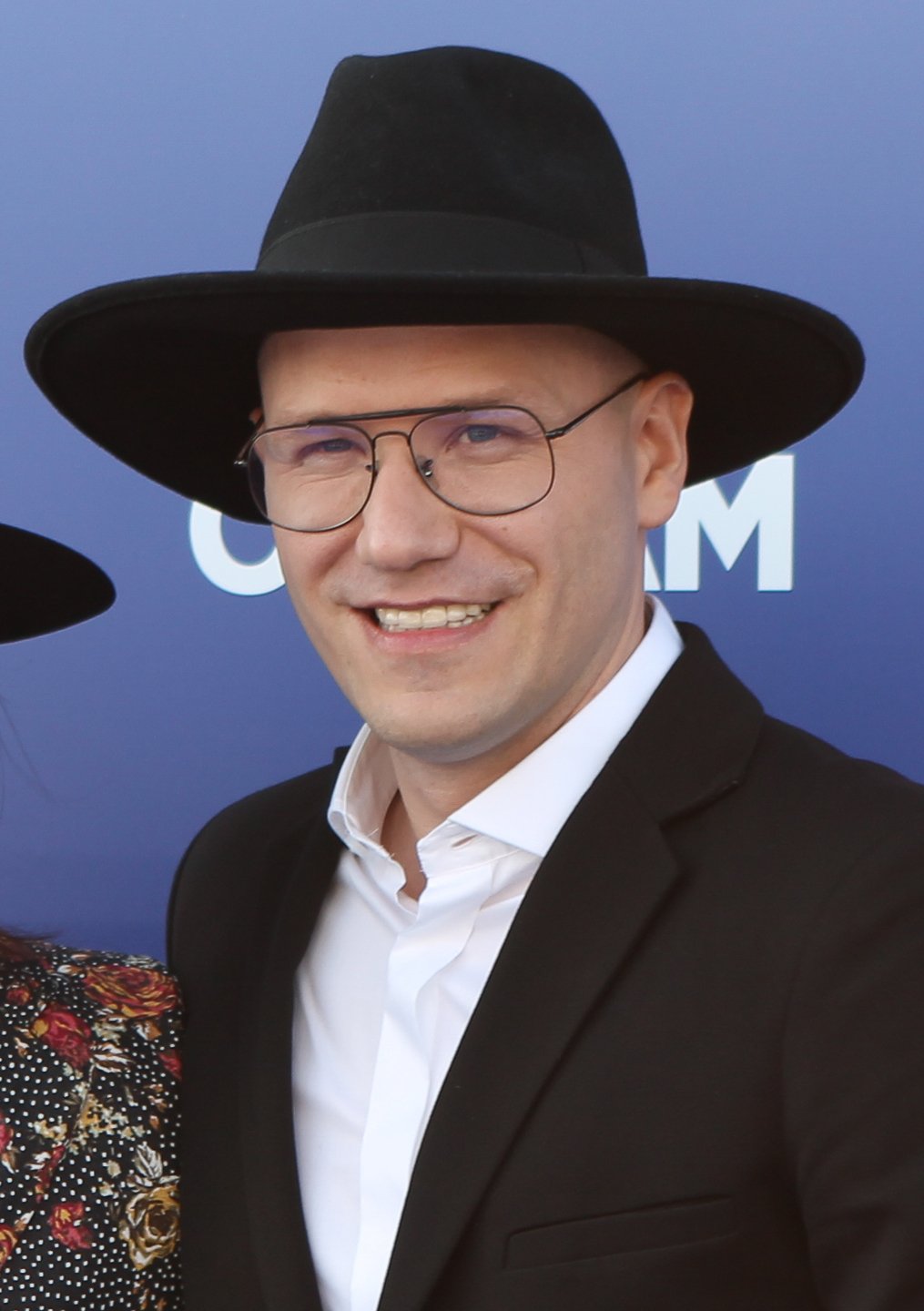
- Gromee in 2018

Background information
- Born: Andrzej Gromala; 14 December 1978 (age 47); Kraków, Poland
- Genres: House
- Occupations: DJ; record producer; remixer; songwriter
- Years active: 2010–present
- Labels: Kingztown; Sony
- Website: gromeeofficial.com

Andrzej Gromala (IPA: [ˈand͡ʐɛj grɔˈmala]; born 14 December 1978), better known by his stage name Gromee, is a Polish DJ, record producer, remixer and owner of Kingztown Music.

== Personal Life and Career ==
In 2016 he signed a record deal with Sony Music. At the Eska Music Awards 2017 he won the award for Best DJ/Producer.

He won the Polish national final for the Eurovision Song Contest 2018 in Lisbon, Portugal. Together with Swedish singer Lukas Meijer, he represented his home country at the Eurovision Song Contest 2018 in Lisbon with the song "Light Me Up".

His solo projects have included Andreas Moe, known for being part of Tiesto's or Hardwell's tracks. He has performed at numerous music festivals. In April 2016 Gromee was the support act for Mariah Carey’s first ever Polish concert. His 2016 summer single "Fearless" reached 10th position on the radio and 2nd position on the TV Airplay Chart and earning a Platinum Record award. His next single, "Spirit", recorded together with Mahan Moin, was his first no. 1 on the Polish Radio Airplay Chart.

In 2018, he married Sara Chmiel.

In 2019, he wrote the theme song for the Junior Eurovision Song Contest 2019 in Gliwice, Poland, "Share the Joy". He also wrote the theme song for Junior Eurovision Song Contest 2020 in Warsaw, Poland, as well as composing the Polish entry, "I'll Be Standing", sung by Ala Tracz.

== Discography ==
=== Studio albums ===
Title	Album details	Peak chart positions	Certifications
Title	Album details	POL	Certifications
Chapter One	Released: 16 March 2018; Labels: Sony Music; Formats: CD, digital download	8	ZPAV: Gold

=== Extended plays ===
Title	Details
Tiny Sparks	Released: 6 May 2022; Labels: Sony Music; Formats: CD, digital download

=== Singles ===
==== As lead artist ====
Title	Year	Peak chart positions					Certifications	Album
Title	Year	POL Air.	POL Streaming	CZE Air.	SVK Air.	CIS Air.	Certifications	Album
"Open Up Your Heart" (featuring Jayden Felder)	2011	—	*	—	—	—		Non-album singles
"You Make Me Say" (featuring Tommy Gunn and Ali Tennant)	2012	—	*	—	—	—		Non-album singles
"Live for the Light" (featuring Ali Tennant)	2012	—	*	—	—	—		Non-album singles
"Hurricane" (featuring Terri B!)	2012	—	*	—	—	—		Chapter One
"Gravity" (featuring Andreas Moe)	2013	—	*	—	—	—		Chapter One
"All Night" (featuring WurlD)	2013	—	*	—	—	—		Non-album singles
"Live Forever" (featuring Wrethov)	2014	—	*	—	—	198		Non-album singles
"Follow You" (featuring WurlD)	2015	11	*	—	—	—	ZPAV: Gold	Chapter One
"2BA"	2015	—	*	—	—	—		Chapter One
"Who Do You Love" (featuring WurlD)	2015	—	*	—	—	—		Chapter One
"Fearless" (featuring May-Britt Scheffer and Raz Nitzan)	2016	10	*	—	—	—	ZPAV: 2× Platinum	Chapter One
"Spirit" (featuring Mahan Moin)	2016	1	*	—	—	182	ZPAV: Platinum	Chapter One
"All Night 2017" (featuring WurlD)	2017	—	*	—	—	—		Chapter One
"Runaway" (featuring Mahan Moin)	2017	7	*	—	—	—	ZPAV: Gold	Chapter One
"Seagulls"	2017	—	*	—	—	—		Non-album singles
"Without You" (featuring Lukas Meijer)	2017	9	*	—	—	—	ZPAV: Platinum	Chapter One
"Zaśnieżone miasta" (featuring Sound'n'Grace)	2017	23	32	—	—	—		Non-album singles
"Light Me Up" (featuring Lukas Meijer)	2018	1	*	16	27	99	ZPAV: 2× Platinum	Chapter One
"One Last Time" (featuring Jesper Jenset)	2018	1	*	33	—	—	ZPAV: 3× Platinum	Non-album singles
"Love Me Now" (featuring WurlD and Devvon Terrell)	2019	62	*	—	—	—		Non-album singles
"Górą Ty" (with Golec uOrkiestra featuring Bedoes)	2019	2	*	—	—	—		Symphoetnic
"Love You Better"	2019	10	*	—	—	—		Non-album singles
"Król" (with Edyta Górniak)	2019	10	*	—	—	—	ZPAV: 2× Platinum	Non-album singles
"Share the Joy"	2019	2	*	—	—	—		Non-album singles
"Sweet Emotions" (with Jesper Jenset)	2020	6	*	—	—	—		Tiny Sparks
"Powiedz mi (kto w tych oczach mieszka)" (featuring Ania Dąbrowska and Abradab)	2020	6	*	—	—	—	ZPAV: Platinum	Tiny Sparks
"Worth It" (featuring Ásdís)	2020	1	*	—	—	146	ZPAV: Gold	Tiny Sparks
"Cool Me Down" (with Inna)	2021	2	*	12	—	147	ZPAV: Gold	Tiny Sparks
"Talk to Me" (with Catali)	2021	23	*	—	—	—		Tiny Sparks
"Broken" (with Olivia Addams)	2021	95	*	—	—	—		Tiny Sparks
"Send Me Your Love" (with Antonia)	2022	5	*	—	—	—		Tiny Sparks
"Aura" (with Wiatr)	2022	—	*	—	—	—		Non-album singles
"Sztuka latania" (with Wac Toja, Sara Chmiel and Jan Borysewicz)	2022	33	*	—	—	—	ZPAV: Gold	Non-album singles
"Ostatni walczyk" (with Sara Chmiel)	2022	—	*	—	—	—		Non-album singles
"Ty i ja" (with Sara Chmiel)	2023	14	—	—	—	—		Non-album singles
"Don't Stop the Party" (with Iraida)	2023	—	—	—	—	—		Non-album singles
"Lost You"	2023	—	—	—	—	—		Non-album singles
"Lover" (featuring Kaeyra)	2023	—	—	—	—	—		Non-album singles
"Deja Vu" (with Gamuel Sori and Kairos Grove)	2024	—	—	—	—	—		Non-album singles
"The Way It Goes" (with Iraida)	2024	—	—	—	—	—		Non-album singles
"Tylko Ty" (with Golec uOrkiestra)	2024	—	—	—	—	—		Non-album singles
"Helium"	2024	—	—	—	—	—		Non-album singles
"Goodbye"	2025	—	—	—	—	—		Non-album singles
"Nie zobaczy nikt" (with Sara Chmiel)	2025	—	—	—	—	—		Non-album singles
"Fire" (with Tyler Shaw)	2025	46	—	—	—	—		Non-album singles
"—" denotes a recording that did not chart or was not released in that territory. "*" denotes the chart did not exist at that time.

Awards and achievements
Preceded by Kasia Moś with "Flashlight"	Poland in the Eurovision Song Contest; 2018 (with Lukas Meijer)	Succeeded by Tulia with "Fire of Love (Pali się)"
