= Lukas Meijer =

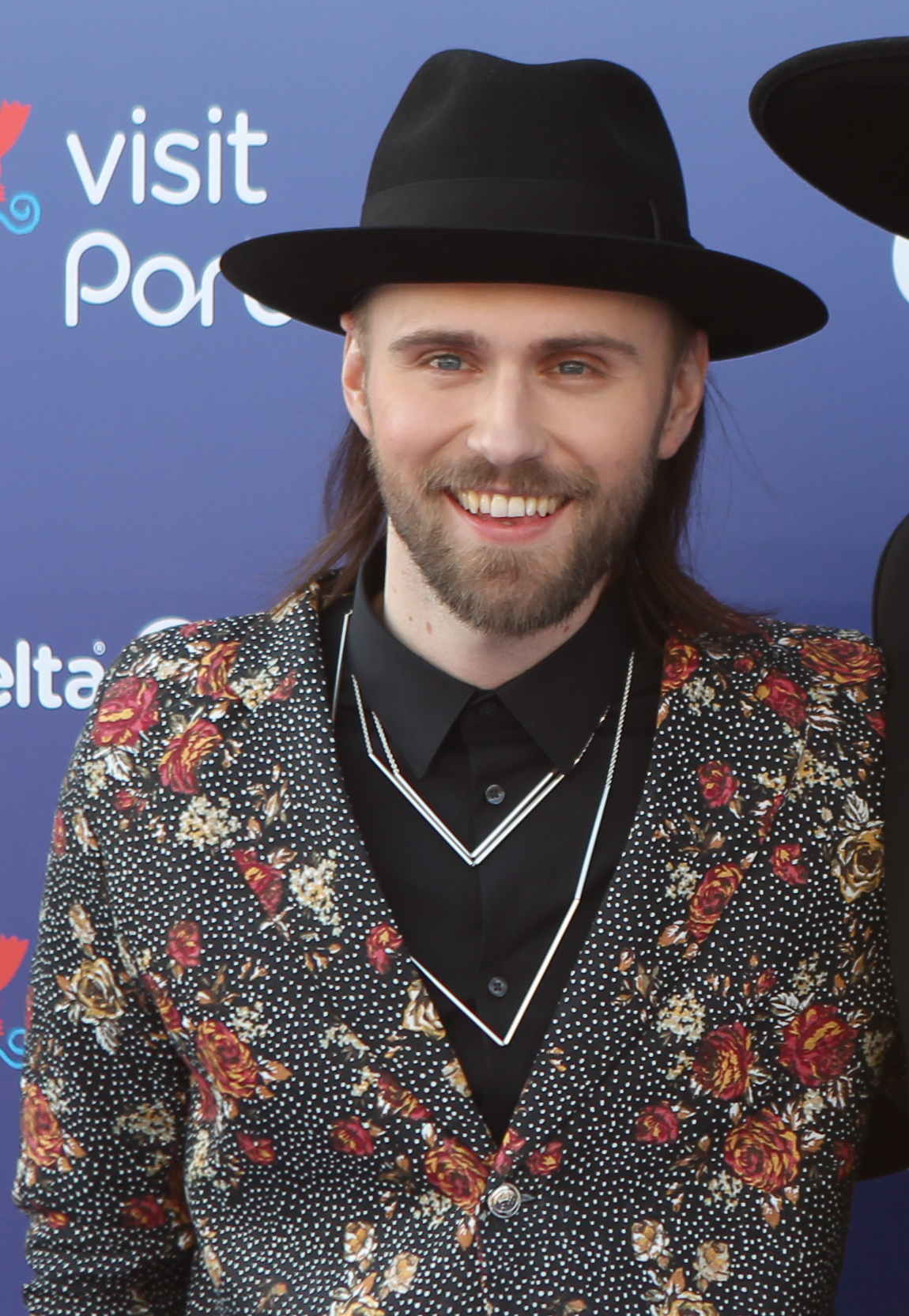
- Meijer in 2018

Background information
- Born: 21 August 1988 (age 37); Ulricehamn, Sweden
- Genres: Rock
- Occupations: Musician, singer, songwriter
- Instrument: Guitar

Lukas Meijer (born 21 August 1988) is a Swedish rock musician, guitarist, singer and songwriter, vocalist of band No Sleep For Lucy.

Together with Polish DJ Gromee, he represented Poland at the Eurovision Song Contest 2018 in Lisbon, Portugal, with the song "Light Me Up".

== Biography ==
He spent his childhood in Ulricehamn. He graduated from high school in Tingsholm and studied at the Uppsala University. In his youth he practiced ice hockey. His brother, Sebastian Meijer, is a professional ice hockey player. Lukas was very close to signing a hockey contract but decide to become a musician instead.

== Discography ==
=== Singles ===
Title	Year	Album
"Lycka är vår tid"	2013	Non-album single

=== As featured artist ===
Title	Year	Peak chart positions				Sales	Certifications	Album
Title	Year	POL	LIT	SLO	RUS	Sales	Certifications	Album
"Without You" (Gromee featuring Lukas Meijer)	2017	9	—	—	—	POL: 20,000	POL: Platinum	Chapter One
"Light Me Up" (Gromee featuring Lukas Meijer)	2018	1	17	27	99	POL: 40,000	POL: 2× Platinum	Chapter One

Awards and achievements
Preceded by Kasia Moś with "Flashlight"	Poland in the Eurovision Song Contest; 2018 (with Gromee)	Succeeded by Tulia with "Fire of Love (Pali się)"
