= Light Me Up (Gromee song) =

2018 single by Gromee and Lukas Meijer

Single by Gromee featuring Lukas Meijer

from the album Chapter One
- Released: 15 February 2018
- Recorded: 2018
- Genre: Tropical house
- Length: 3:38
- Label: Sony Music Poland
- Songwriters: Mahan Moin; Christian Rabb
- Producers: Andrzej Gromala; Lukas Meijer

Gromee singles chronology
"Zaśnieżone miasta" (2017)	"Light Me Up" (2018)	"One Last Time" (2018)

Lukas Meijer singles chronology
"Without You" (2017)	"Light Me Up" (2018)

Music video
- "Light Me Up" on YouTube

(Poland) "Light Me Up"

Eurovision Song Contest 2018 entry
- Country: Poland
- Artist: Gromee feat. Lukas Meijer
- Language: English
- Composers: Gromee; Lukas Meijer
- Lyricists: Mahan Moin; Christian Rabb

Finals performance
- Semi-final result: 14th
- Semi-final points: 81

Entry chronology
- ◄ "Flashlight" (2017)
- "Pali się" (2019) ►

"Light Me Up" is a song by Polish music producer Gromee featuring vocals by Swedish singer Lukas Meijer. The song was released as a digital download on 15 February 2018. The song was written by Gromee, Lukas Meijer, Mahan Moin and Christian Rabb.

== Eurovision Song Contest ==
The song represented Poland in the Eurovision Song Contest 2018 in Lisbon, Portugal. The song competed in the second semi-final, held on 10 May 2018. It did not advance to the grand final.

== Chart performance ==
In April, "Light Me Up" peaked at number 1 in Poland and stayed on the top for 4 weeks in a row becoming the most successful Polish entry for Eurovision at this chart. The song got an airplay in Czech Republic, Slovakia and Russia a few weeks before Poland's performance on second semi final as well.

== Music video ==
The official music video is filmed in Barcelona.

== Track listing ==
Digital download
No.	Title	Length
1.	"Light Me Up" (featuring Lukas Meijer)	3:38

== Charts ==
=== Weekly charts ===
Chart (2018)	Peak position
Czech Republic Airplay (ČNS IFPI)	16
Poland Airplay (ZPAV)	1
Poland Dance (ZPAV)	4
Poland (Video Chart)	1
Russia Airplay (Tophit)	99
Slovakia Airplay (ČNS IFPI)	27

=== Year-end charts ===
Chart (2018)	Position
Poland (ZPAV)	7

== Certifications ==
Region	Certification	Certified units/sales
Poland (ZPAV)	2× Platinum	40,000^{‡}
^{‡} Sales+streaming figures based on certification alone.

== Release history ==
Region	Date	Format	Label
Various	15 February 2018	Digital download	Sony Music Poland

== See also ==
- List of number-one singles of 2018 (Poland)
