= Pali się =

2019 song by Tulia

Single by Tulia

from the album Tulia (Deluxe Edition)
- Released: 23 November 2018
- Length: 2:45
- Label: Universal Music Polska
- Composer(s): Nadia Dalin
- Lyricist(s): Sonia Krasny; Allan Rich; Jud Friedmann

Tulia singles chronology
"Wstajemy już" (2018)	"Pali się" (2018)	"Trawnik" (2019)

Music video
- "Fire of Love (Pali się)" on YouTube

Eurovision Song Contest 2019 entry
- Country: Poland
- Artist(s): Tulia
- Languages: Polish, English
- Composer(s): Nadia Dalin
- Lyricist(s): Sonia Krasny; Allan Rich; Jud Friedmann

Finals performance
- Semi-final result: 11th
- Semi-final points: 120

Entry chronology
- ◄ "Light Me Up" (2018)
- "Empires" (2020) ►

"Pali się" ([ˈpa.lʲi ɕɛ]) is a song by Polish band Tulia. A bilingual version with additional English text, titled "Fire of Love (Pali się)", represented Poland in the Eurovision Song Contest 2019 in Tel Aviv. It did not progress to the final.

== Eurovision Song Contest ==
The song was selected to represent Poland in the Eurovision Song Contest 2019 after Tulia was internally selected by the Polish broadcaster. On 28 January 2019, a special allocation draw was held which placed each country into one of the two semi-finals, as well as which half of the show they would perform in. Poland was placed into the first semi-final, to be held on 14 May 2019, and was scheduled to perform in the first half of the show. Once all the competing songs for the 2019 contest had been released, the running order for the semi-finals was decided by the show's producers rather than through another draw, so that similar songs were not placed next to each other. Poland performed in position 4, and did not qualify for the final. It was later revealed that Poland was placed 11th in the semi-final, receiving 120 points, missing qualification by 2 points. It is also the best-scoring Eurovision song which failed to qualify to the final.

== Music video ==
The wayside cross with the band walking alongside the road featured in the original music video.

The team's representatives confirmed that the main inspiration in the making of the music video was the film Cold War, directed by Paweł Pawlikowski. The video features cameos by Polish actors Jędrzej Tarank, Bartłomiej Firlet and Piotr Miazga from the television series Ojciec Mateusz.

=== Controversy ===
The original music video for the song featured a wayside cross, although this cross was later removed in the music video for the song's Eurovision version. Following the realisation that the cross had been removed, allegations of censorship and discrimination against Christians arose. General director of Polish broadcaster Telewizja Polska (TVP) Jacek Kurski called for the record company Universal Music Polska to restore the original version of the music video. The two videos are nearly identical, apart from the erasure of the cross in the Eurovision version.

Tulia's management stated in an interview that the cross was removed due to European Broadcasting Union (EBU) restrictions on the promotion of political institutions; they also added that they themselves were not responsible for the editing of the video. However, a figure of John of Nepomuk is still visible in the background of the Eurovision version music video.

== Track listing ==
Digital download
No.	Title	Length
1.	"Fire of Love (Pali Się)"	2:45
