= Taniec z gwiazdami season 7 =

Taniec z gwiazdami
- Season 7
- Hosted by: Piotr Gąsowski; Katarzyna Skrzynecka
- Judges: Iwona Pavlović; Piotr Galiński; Beata Tyszkiewicz; Zbigniew Wodecki
- Celebrity winner: Magdalena Walach
- Professional winner: Cezary Olszewski
- No. of episodes: 13

Release
- Original network: TVN
- Original release: 2 March – 25 May 2008

Season chronology
- ← Previous; 6 Next → 8

The 7th season of Taniec z gwiazdami, the Polish edition of Dancing with the Stars, started on 2 March 2008 and ended on 25 May 2008. It was broadcast by TVN. Katarzyna Skrzynecka and Piotr Gąsowski continued as the hosts, and the judges were: Iwona Szymańska-Pavlović, Zbigniew Wodecki, Beata Tyszkiewicz and Piotr Galiński.

On 25 May, Magdalena Walach and her partner Cezary Olszewski were crowned the champions.

== Couples ==
Celebrity	Occupation	Professional partner	Status
Michał Lesień	Film and television actor	Katarzyna Krupa	Eliminated 1st on 2 March 2008
Agnieszka Cegielska	TVN weather presenter	Żora Korolyov †	Eliminated 2nd on 9 March 2008
Katarzyna Figura	Film and television actress	Rafał Maserak	Eliminated 3rd on 16 March 2008
Tomasz Schimscheiner	Na Wspólnej actor	Kamila Kajak	Eliminated 4th on 23 March 2008
Marina Łuczenko	Singer and actress	Michał Uryniuk	Eliminated 5th on 30 March 2008
Małgorzata Socha	Film and television actress	Robert Kochanek	Eliminated 6th on 6 April 2008
Łukasz Zagrobelny	Singer	Anna Głogowska	Eliminated 7th on 13 April 2008
Marek Kaliszuk	Film and television actor	Nina Tyrka	Eliminated 8th on 20 April 2008
Wojciech Łozowski	Singer and television presenter	Blanka Winiarska	Eliminated 9th on 27 April 2008
Elisabeth Duda	Film and television actress	Mario Di Somma	Eliminated 10th on 4 May 2008
Robert Janowski	Actor, singer and Jaka to melodia? host	Anna Bosak	Eliminated 11th on 11 May 2008
Tamara Arciuch	Film and television actress	Łukasz Czarnecki	Third Place on 18 May 2008
Mariusz Pudzianowski	World's Strongest Man champion	Magdalena Soszyńska-Michno	Second Place on 25 May 2008
Magdalena Walach	Film and television actress	Cezary Olszewski †	Winners on 25 May 2008

== Scores ==
Couple	Place	1	2	3	4	5	6	7	8	9	10	11	12	13
Magdalena & Cezary	1	-	35†	38†	29	40†	35	40†	34	38†	40+37=77†	38+40=78†	39+40=79†	40+40+40=120†
Mariusz & Magdalena	2	24‡	-	29	34	34	37†	29‡	31	31‡	26+28=54‡	34+35=69	40+36=76‡	36+40+38=114‡
Tamara & Łukasz	3	-	32	34	28	38	33	40†	31	32	40+34=74	38+40=78†	38+40=78	
Robert & Anna	4	32	-	26	29	36	36	33	29‡	32	29+29=58	29+34=63‡		
Elisabeth & Mario	5	-	27‡	32	38†	27	34	31	37†	32	35+39=74			
Wojciech & Blanka	6	32	-	36	29	36	34	40†	35	34				
Marek & Nina	7	30	-	27	35	31	37†	33	30					
Łukasz & Anna	8	28	-	20‡	31	26‡	30‡	37						
Małgorzata & Robert	9	-	30	21	32	37	33							
Marina & Michał	10	-	34	33	22‡	30								
Tomasz & Kamila	11	33†	-	31	28									
Katarzyna & Rafał	12	-	31	30										
Agnieszka & Żora	13	-	30											
Michał & Katarzyna	14	25												

Red numbers indicate the lowest score for each week.
Green numbers indicate the highest score for each week.
indicates the couple eliminated that week.
indicates the returning couple that finished in the bottom two.
indicates the winning couple of the week.
indicates the runner-up of the week.
indicates the third place couple of the week.

Notes:

Week 1: Only male celebrities' dances were judged in this episode. Female celebrities danced a group Mambo. Tomasz Schimscheiner was on the top of the leaderboard having scored 33 out of 40 for his Waltz. Mariusz Pudzianowski got 24 points for his Cha-cha-cha, making it the lowest score of the week. Michał & Katarzyna were eliminated.

Week 2: Only female celebrities' dances were judged in this episode. Male celebrities danced a group Swing. Magdalena Walach scored 35 points for her Quickstep and won the episode. Elisabeth Duda got 27 points for her Quickstep, making it the lowest score of the week. Agnieszka & Żora were eliminated despite being 3 points from the bottom.

Week 3: Magdalena & Cezary were on the top of the leaderboard again with 38 points for their Tango. Łukasz Zagrobelny got the season's lowest score (20) for his Jive. Katarzyna & Rafał were eliminated despite being 10 points from the bottom.

Week 4: Elisabeth Duda was on top of the leaderboard, having scored 38 out of 40 for her Paso Doble, but the episode was won by Mariusz Pudzianowski. Marina Łuczenko got 22 points for herPaso Doble, making it the lowest score of the week. Tomasz & Kamila were eliminated despite being 6 points from the bottom.

Week 5: Magdalena Walach got the first perfect score of the season for her Viennese Waltz. Łukasz Zagrobelny got 26 points for his Salsa, making it the lowest score of the week. Marina & Michał were eliminated despite being 4 points from the bottom.

Week 6: Mariusz Pudzianowski and Marek Kaliszuk both scored 37 points for American Smooth and were on top of the leaderboard. Łukasz Zagrobelny got 30 points for his American Smooth, making it the lowest score of the week. Małgorzata & Robert were eliminated despite being 3 points from the bottom.

Week 7: Magdalena Walach, Tamara Arciuch and Wojciech Łozowski all got a perfect score in this episode. Mariusz Pudzianowski got 29 points for his Rumba, making it the lowest score of the week. Łukasz & Anna were eliminated despite being 8 points from the bottom.

Week 8: Elisabeth Duda was on top of the leaderboard for the second time, but the episode was won by Mariusz Pudzianowski. Robert Janowski got 29 points for his Tango, making it the lowest score of the week. Marek & Nina were eliminated despite being 1 points from the bottom.

Week 9: Magdalena Walach scored 38 out of 40 for her Foxtrot and won the episode. Mariusz Pudzianowski got 31 points for his Tango, making it the lowest score of the week. Wojciech & Blanka were eliminated despite being 3 points from the bottom.

Week 10: Magdalena & Cezary got their third perfect score for the American Smooth and Tamara Arciuch got her second perfect score for the American Smooth. Even though he was at the bottom of the leaderboard, Mariusz Pudzianowski took the second place in the episode. Elisabeth & Mario were eliminated, despite being 20 points from the bottom. This was the highest score difference between the eliminated and the lowest-scoring couple in history of the show.

Week 11: Magdalena Walach and Tamara Arciuch both scored 38 points for Jive and 40 points for Tango. Robert & Anna were eliminated.

Week 12: Every couple got a perfect score for the Argentine Tango. Tamara & Łukasz were eliminated.

Week 13: Magdalena & Cezary got the highest possible score with perfect scores for all three dances: Jive, Argentine Tango and Freestyle. Mariusz & Magdalena received a perfect score only for the Argentine Tango. Magdalena Walach & Cezary Olszewski were proclaimed the winners of this season. This marks the fifth time the winner was also on the first place on the judges' general scoreboard and the second time one couple's Freestyle didn't get a perfect score. Peter J. Lucas didn't get a perfect score for his Freestyle too, in Season 4.

== Average chart ==
Rank by average	Place	Couple	Average	Total	Best Score	Worst Score
1.	1.	Magdalena Walach & Cezary Olszewski	38	643	40	29
2.	3.	Tamara Arciuch & Łukasz Czarnecki	36	498	40	28
3.	6.	Wojciech Łozowski & Blanka Winiarska	35	276	40	29
4.	5.	Elisabeth Duda & Mario Di Somma	33	332	39	27
5.	2.	Mariusz Pudzianowski & Magdalena Soszyńska-Michno	33	562	40	24
6.	7.	Marek Kaliszuk & Nina Tyrka	32	223	37	27
7.	4.	Robert Janowski & Anna Bosak	31	374	36	26
8.	11.	Tomasz Schimscheiner & Kamila Kajak	31	92	33	28
9.	9.	Małgorzata Socha & Robert Kochanek	31	153	37	21
10.	12.	Katarzyna Figura & Rafał Maserak	31	61	31	30
11.	13.	Agnieszka Cegielska & Żora Koroliow	30	30	30	30
12.	10.	Marina Łuczenko & Michał Uryniuk	30	119	34	22
13.	8.	Łukasz Zagrobelny & Anna Głogowska	29	172	37	20
14.	14.	Michał Lesień & Katarzyna Krupa	25	25	25	25
All couples			33	3558		

== Average dance chart ==
Couples	Averages	Best Dances	Worst Dances
Magdalena & Cezary	37.8	Viennese Waltz, Waltz, American Smooth, Tango, Argentine Tango (twice), Jive, Freestyle (40)	Paso Doble (29)
Tamara & Łukasz	35.6	Waltz, American Smooth, Tango, Argentine Tango (40)	Paso Doble (28)
Wojciech & Blanka	34.5	Rumba (40)	Foxtrot (29)
Elisabeth & Mario	33.2	Cha-Cha-Cha (39)	Quickstep, Viennese Waltz (27)
Mariusz & Magdalena	33.0	Argentine Tango (twice) (40)	Cha-Cha-Cha (24)
Marek & Nina	31.9	American Smooth (37)	Jive (27)
Robert & Anna	31.2	Salsa, American Smooth (36)	Jive (26)
Tomasz & Kamila	30.7	Waltz (33)	Foxtrot (28)
Małgorzata & Robert	30.6	Viennese Waltz (37)	Tango (21)
Katarzyna & Rafał	30.5	Rumba (31)	Tango (30)
Agnieszka & Żora	30.0	Rumba (30)	Rumba (30)
Marina & Michał	29.8	Rumba (34)	Paso Doble (22)
Łukasz & Anna	28.7	Cha-Cha-Cha (37)	Jive (20)
Michał & Katarzyna	25.0	Cha-Cha-Cha (25)	Cha-Cha-Cha (25)

== Highest and lowest scoring performances ==
The best and worst performances in each dance according to the judges' marks are as follows:

Dance	Best dancer	Best score	Worst dancer	Worst score
Cha-Cha-Cha	Elisabeth Duda	39	Mariusz Pudzianowski	24
Waltz	Magdalena Walach; Tamara Arciuch	40	Łukasz Zagrobelny	28
Quickstep	Magdalena Walach; Wojciech Łozowski	35	Elisabeth Duda	27
Rumba	Wojciech Łozowski	40	Mariusz Pudzianowski	29
Jive	Magdalena Walach	40	Łukasz Zagrobelny	20
Tango	Tamara Arciuch; Magdalena Walach	40	Małgorzata Socha	21
Foxtrot	Magdalena Walach	38	Tomasz Schimscheiner	28
Paso Doble	Elisabeth Duda	38	Marina Łuczenko	22
Samba	Magdalena Walach	35	Mariusz Pudzianowski	26
Viennese Waltz	Magdalena Walach	40	Elisabeth Duda	27
American Smooth	Tamara Arciuch; Magdalena Walach	40	Łukasz Zagrobelny	30
Salsa	Magdalena Walach	39	Łukasz Zagrobelny	26
Argentine Tango	Magdalena Walach; Mariusz Pudzianowski; Tamara Arciuch	40		
Freestyle	Magdalena Walach	40	Mariusz Pudzianowski	38

== Episodes ==
Individual judges scores in the charts below (given in parentheses) are listed in this order from left to right: Iwona Szymańska-Pavlović, Zbigniew Wodecki, Beata Tyszkiewicz and Piotr Galiński.

=== Week 1 ===
Running order

Couple	Score	Style	Music
Michał & Katarzyna	25 (5,6,8,6)	Cha-Cha-Cha	"I Wanna Be the Only One"—Eternal
Łukasz & Anna	28 (5,7,9,7)	Waltz	"Can You Feel the Love Tonight"—Elton John
Mariusz & Magdalena	24 (4,7,8,5)	Cha-Cha-Cha	"Cuéntame Que Te Pasó"—Rosario Flores
Tomasz & Kamila	33 (8,8,9,8)	Waltz	"Against All Odds (Take a Look at Me Now)"—Phil Collins
Wojciech & Blanka	32 (7,8,9,8)	Cha-Cha-Cha	"Murder on the Dancefloor"—Sophie Ellis-Bextor
Marek & Nina	30 (7,8,8,7)	Waltz	"My Heart Will Go On"—Céline Dion
Robert & Anna	32 (6,9,9,8)	Cha-Cha-Cha	"Joe le taxi"—Vanessa Paradis
Małgorzata & Robert; Tamara & Łukasz; Marina & Michał; Magalena & Cezary; Agnieszka & Żora; Elisabeth & Mario; Katarzyna & Rafał	N/A	Group Mambo	"I Still Haven't Found What I'm Looking For"—U2

=== Week 2 ===
Running order

Couple	Score	Style	Music
Małgorzata & Robert	30 (7,7,9,7)	Rumba	"Wicked Game"—Chris Isaak
Tamara & Łukasz	32 (7,9,9,7)	Quickstep	"Sparkling Diamonds"—Marilyn Monroe
Marina & Michał	34 (8,9,9,8)	Rumba	"Sorry Seems to Be the Hardest Word"—Elton John
Magdalena & Cezary	35 (8,9,9,9)	Quickstep	"Mack the Knife"—Bobby Darin
Agnieszka & Żora	30 (6,8,9,7)	Rumba	"Say You, Say Me"—Lionel Richie
Elisabeth & Mario	27 (5,8,8,6)	Quickstep	"You're the One That I Want"—John Travolta & Olivia Newton-John
Katarzyna & Rafał	31 (7,8,9,7)	Rumba	"If There's Any Justice"—Lemar
Łukasz & Anna; Mariusz & Magdalena; Tomasz & Kamila; Wojciech & Blanka; Marek & Nina; Robert & Anna	N/A	Group Swing	"This Will Be"—Eric Brice

=== Week 3 ===
Running order

Couple	Score	Style	Music
Robert & Anna	26 (4,7,9,6)	Jive	"Part-Time Lover"—Stevie Wonder
Elisabeth & Mario	32 (6,9,9,8)	Tango	"Voyage Voyage"—Desireless
Marek & Nina	27 (6,7,8,6)	Jive	"I'm So Excited"—The Pointer Sisters
Tamara & Łukasz	34 (7,9,10,8)	Tango	"Little Lies"—Fleetwood Mac
Łukasz & Anna	20 (3,6,7,4)	Jive	"Crazy Little Thing Called Love"—Queen
Katarzyna & Rafał	30 (6,8,9,7)	Tango	"Sweet Dreams (Are Made of This)"—Eurythmics
Wojciech & Blanka	36 (8,9,10,9)	Jive	"Footloose"—Kenny Loggins
Małgorzata & Robert	21 (3,6,8,4)	Tango	"Here Comes the Rain Again"—Eurythmics
Mariusz & Magdalena	29 (5,8,9,7)	Jive	"Wake Me Up Before You Go-Go"—Wham!
Marina & Michał	33 (7,9,9,8)	Tango	"Jealousy"—Paris Hilton
Tomasz & Kamila	31 (6,8,9,8)	Jive	"Just a Gigolo"—Leonello Casucci
Magdalena & Cezary	38 (8,10,10,10)	Tango	"You Don't Fool Me"—Queen

=== Week 4 ===
Running order

Couple	Score	Style	Music
Wojciech & Blanka	29 (6,8,9,6)	Foxtrot	"Me and My Shadow"—Dave Dreyer
Magdalena & Cezary	29 (6,8,10,5)	Paso Doble	"Livin' on a Prayer"—Bon Jovi
Tomasz & Kamila	28 (5,9,9,5)	Foxtrot	"Ain't That a Kick in the Head?"—Dean Martin
Małgorzata & Robert	32 (7,9,9,7)	Paso Doble	"Don't Let Me Be Misunderstood"—The Animals
Robert & Anna	29 (5,8,9,7)	Foxtrot	"Dream a Little Dream of Me"—Fabian Andre & Wilbur Schwandt
Marina & Michał	22 (3,7,9,3)	Paso Doble	"Free Your Mind"—En Vogue
Łukasz & Anna	31 (6,9,9,7)	Foxtrot	"Your Song"—Elton John
Elisabeth & Mario	38 (8,10,10,10)	Paso Doble	"Smooth Criminal"—Michael Jackson
Marek & Nina	35 (8,10,10,7)	Foxtrot	"All That Jazz"—Liza Minnelli
Tamara & Łukasz	28 (5,9,9,5)	Paso Doble	"(I Just) Died in Your Arms"—Cutting Crew
Mariusz & Magdalena	34 (7,9,10,8)	Foxtrot	"Hello, Dolly!"—Louis Armstrong

=== Week 5 ===
Running order

Couple	Score	Style	Music
Marek & Nina	31 (7,8,9,7)	Salsa	"Santo Santo"—Só Pra Contrariar
Marina & Michał	30 (7,8,9,6)	Viennese Waltz	"Fallin'"—Alicia Keys
Robert & Anna	36 (8,9,10,9)	Salsa	"Bailando Contigo"—Daniel Santacruz
Elisabeth & Mario	27 (4,8,9,6)	Viennese Waltz	"Where the Wild Roses Grow"—Nick Cave & Kylie Minogue
Łukasz & Anna	26 (5,7,9,5)	Salsa	"Mi Tierra"—Gloria Estefan
Magdalena & Cezary	40 (10,10,10,10)	Viennese Waltz	"What a Wonderful World"—Louis Armstrong
Mariusz & Magdalena	34 (7,9,10,8)	Salsa	"Dr. Beat"—Miami Sound Machine
Tamara & Łukasz	38 (9,10,10,9)	Viennese Waltz	"True Colors"—Cyndi Lauper
Wojciech & Blanka	36 (8,8,10,10)	Salsa	"Hot Hot Hot"—Arrow
Małgorzata & Robert	37 (8,9,10,10)	Viennese Waltz	"Morning Has Broken"—Cat Stevens

=== Week 6 ===
Running order

Couple	Score	Style	Music
Łukasz & Anna	30 (5,8,9,8)	American Smooth	"Call Me Irresponsible"—Jimmy Van Heusen
Małgorzata & Robert	33 (8,8,10,7)	Samba	"I Don't Feel Like Dancin'"—Scissor Sisters
Wojciech & Blanka	34 (8,8,10,8)	American Smooth	"Do Nothing till You Hear from Me"—Duke Ellington
Tamara & Łukasz	33 (7,8,10,8)	Samba	"Crazy in Love"—Beyoncé Knowles
Mariusz & Magdalena	37 (9,9,10,9)	American Smooth	"Orange Colored Sky"—Nat King Cole
Elisabeth & Mario	34 (5,9,10,10)	Samba	"Hips Don't Lie"—Shakira & Wyclef Jean
Robert & Anna	36 (7,10,10,9)	American Smooth	"Blue Moon"—Richard Rodgers & Lorenz Hart
Magdalena & Cezary	35 (6,10,10,9)	Samba	"Blame It on the Boogie"—The Jacksons
Marek & Nina	37 (9,10,9,9)	American Smooth	"It Had to Be You"—Isham Jones

=== Week 7 ===
Running order

Couple	Score	Style	Music
Mariusz & Magdalena	29 (6,8,9,6)	Rumba	"She Will Be Loved"—Maroon 5
Marek & Nina	33 (7,9,10,7)	Cha-Cha-Cha	"Señorita"—Justin Timberlake
Magdalena & Cezary	40 (10,10,10,10)	Waltz	"She"—Charles Aznavour & Herbert Kretzmer
Wojciech & Blanka	40 (10,10,10,10)	Rumba	"Whatever Happens"—Michael Jackson
Elisabeth & Mario	31 (6,9,9,7)	Waltz	"(You Make Me Feel Like) A Natural Woman"—Aretha Franklin
Robert & Anna	33 (7,9,9,8)	Rumba	"Right Here Waiting"—Richard Marx
Tamara & Łukasz	40 (10,10,10,10)	Waltz	"You Light Up My Life"—Kasey Cisyk
Łukasz & Anna	37 (8,10,10,9)	Cha-Cha-Cha	"Rock DJ"—Robbie Williams

=== Week 8: French Week ===
Running order

Couple	Score	Style	Music
Magdalena & Cezary	34 (6,10,10,8)	Rumba	"Paris Paris"—Malcolm McLaren & Catherine Deneuve
Robert & Anna	29 (5,10,9,5)	Tango	"Et si tu n'existais pas"—Joe Dassin
Tamara & Łukasz	31 (5,9,10,7)	Rumba	"Je t'aime... moi non plus"—Serge Gainsbourg
Marek & Nina	30 (6,9,9,6)	Quickstep	Theme song from The Umbrellas of Cherbourg
Wojciech & Blanka	35 (8,9,10,8)	Quickstep	"Milord"—Édith Piaf
Elisabeth & Mario	37 (9,9,10,9)	Rumba	"Paroles, paroles"—Dalida & Alain Delon
Mariusz & Magdalena	31 (6,9,10,6)	Waltz	"Ne me quitte pas"—Jacques Brel
Magdalena & Cezary; Tamara & Łukasz; Elisabeth & Mario; Robert & Anna; Marek & Nina; Wojciech & Blanka; Mariusz & Magdalena	N/A	Group Viennese Waltz	"Sous le ciel de Paris"—Édith Piaf

=== Week 9: James Bond Week ===
Running order

Couple	Score	Style	Music	Movie
Tamara & Łukasz	32 (7,9,9,7)	Foxtrot	"You Only Live Twice"—Nancy Sinatra	You Only Live Twice
Wojciech & Blanka	34 (8,8,10,8)	Paso Doble	"Die Another Day"—Madonna	Die Another Day
Elisabeth & Mario	32 (7,9,9,7)	Foxtrot	"We Have All the Time in the World"—Louis Armstrong	On Her Majesty's Secret Service
Mariusz & Magdalena	31 (6,9,10,6)	Tango	"A View to a Kill"—Duran Duran	A View to a Kill
Magdalena & Cezary	38 (9,10,10,9)	Foxtrot	"Goldfinger"—Shirley Bassey	Goldfinger
Robert & Anna	32 (7,9,9,7)	Paso Doble	"The Living Daylights"—a-ha	The Living Daylights
Magdalena & Cezary; Tamara & Łukasz; Elisabeth & Mario; Robert & Anna; Wojciech & Blanka; Mariusz & Magdalena	N/A	Group Freestyle	"GoldenEye"—Tina Turner	GoldenEye

=== Week 10 ===
Running order

Couple	Score	Style	Music
Elisabeth & Mario	35 (7,10,10,8)	American Smooth	"Only You (And You Alone)"—The Platters
Elisabeth & Mario	39 (9,10,10,10)	Cha-Cha-Cha	"Cosmic Girl"—Jamiroquai
Robert & Anna	29 (5,9,10,5)	Samba	"Over My Shoulder"—Mike + The Mechanics
Robert & Anna	29 (5,9,9,6)	Viennese Waltz	"Memory"—Andrew Lloyd Webber
Magdalena & Cezary	40 (10,10,10,10)	American Smooth	"Straighten Up and Fly Right"—Nat King Cole
Magdalena & Cezary	37 (8,10,10,9)	Cha-Cha-Cha	"The Loco-Motion"—Gerry Goffin & Carole King
Mariusz & Magdalena	26 (5,8,9,4)	Samba	"Don't You Worry 'bout a Thing"—Stevie Wonder
Mariusz & Magdalena	28 (4,10,10,4)	Viennese Waltz	"You Don't Know Me"—Eddy Arnold
Tamara & Łukasz	40 (10,10,10,10)	American Smooth	"New York, New York"—Liza Minnelli
Tamara & Łukasz	34 (7,10,10,7)	Cha-Cha-Cha	"Unchain My Heart"—Ray Charles

=== Week 11: Polish Week ===
Running order

Couple	Score	Style	Music
Mariusz & Magdalena	34 (7,10,10,7)	Quickstep	"Żegnaj kotku"—Hanna Banaszak
Mariusz & Magdalena	35 (8,10,10,7)	Cha-Cha-Cha	"Intymnie"—Ryszard Rynkowski
Tamara & Łukasz	38 (9,10,10,9)	Jive	"Nikt na świecie nie wie"—Czerwone Gitary
Tamara & Łukasz	40 (10,10,10,10)	Tango	"Tango Memento Vitae"—Stanisław Sojka
Robert & Anna	29 (6,9,9,5)	Quickstep	"Nie dokazuj"—Marek Grechuta
Robert & Anna	34 (7,10,10,7)	Cha-Cha-Cha	"Gaj"—Marek Grechuta
Magdalena & Cezary	38 (9,10,10,9)	Jive	"Płonąca stodoła"—Czesław Niemen
Magdalena & Cezary	40 (10,10,10,10)	Tango	"Kraków — ocean wolnego czasu"—Maanam

=== Week 12 ===
Running order

Couple	Score	Style	Music
Magdalena & Cezary	39 (9,10,10,10)	Salsa	"Vehicle"—Jim Peterik
Magdalena & Cezary	40 (10,10,10,10)	Argentine Tango	"Por una Cabeza"—Carlos Gardel
Mariusz & Magdalena	40 (10,10,10,10)	Argentine Tango	"El Choclo"—Ángel Villoldo
Mariusz & Magdalena	36 (8,10,10,8)	Paso Doble	"Let's Dance"—David Bowie
Tamara & Łukasz	38 (9,10,10,9)	Salsa	"Moliendo Café"—Hugo Blanco
Tamara & Łukasz	40 (10,10,10,10)	Argentine Tango	"Tanguera"—Mariano Mores

=== Week 13: Final ===
Running order

Couple	Score	Style	Music
Magdalena & Cezary	40 (10,10,10,10)	Jive	"Płonąca stodoła"—Czesław Niemen
Magdalena & Cezary	40 (10,10,10,10)	Argentine Tango	"Por una Cabeza"—Carlos Gardel
Magdalena & Cezary	40 (10,10,10,10)	Freestyle	"Jesse"—Janis Ian
Mariusz & Magdalena	36 (9,9,10,8)	Cha-Cha-Cha	"Intymnie"—Ryszard Rynkowski
Mariusz & Magdalena	40 (10,10,10,10)	Argentine Tango	"El Choclo"—Ángel Villoldo
Mariusz & Magdalena	38 (9,10,10,9)	Freestyle	"It Is You (I Have Loved)"—Dana Glover "I'm a Believer"—Smash Mouth (both songs from Shrek)

Another Dances

Couple	Style	Music
Tamara & Łukasz	Tango	"Tango Memento Vitae" — Stanisław Soyka
Robert & Anna	American Smooth	"Blue Moon" - Richard Rodgers & Lorenz Hart
Elisabeth & Mario	Rumba	"Paroles, paroles" - Dalida & Alain Delon
Wojciech & Blanka	Jive	"Footloose" — Kenny Loggins (from Footloose)
Marek & Nina	Waltz	"My Heart Will Go On" - Celine Dion
Łukasz & Anna	Cha-Cha-Cha	"Rock DJ" - Robbie Williams
Małgorzata & Robert	Paso Doble	"Don't Let Me Be Misunderstood" - The Animals
Marina & Michał	Rumba	"Sorry Seems to Be the Hardest Word" - Elton John
Tomasz & Kamila	Waltz	"Against All Odds (Take a Look at Me Now)" - Phil Collins
Katarzyna & Rafał	Tango	"Sweet Dreams (Are Made of This)" - Eurythmics
Agnieszka & Żora	Rumba	"Say You, Say Me" - Lionel Richie
Michał & Katarzyna	Cha-Cha-Cha	"I Wanna Be the Only One" - Eternal
Anna Guzik & Łukasz Czarnecki (6th Season Winner)	Argentine Tango	"Libertango" - Ástor Piazzolla

== Dance chart ==
The celebrities and professional partners danced one of these routines for each corresponding week.

- Week 1: Cha-Cha-Cha or Waltz (Men) & Group Mambo (Women)
- Week 2: Rumba or Quickstep (Women) & Group Swing (Men)
- Week 3: Jive (Men) or Tango (Women)
- Week 4: Paso Doble (Women) or Foxtrot (Men)
- Week 5: Salsa (Men) or Viennese Waltz (Women)
- Week 6: Samba (Women) or American Smooth (Men)
- Week 7: One unlearned dance
- Week 8: One unlearned dance & Group Viennese Waltz (French Song Week)
- Week 9: One unlearned dance & Group Freestyle
- Week 10: One unlearned Latin dance & One unlearned Ballroom dance
- Week 11: One unlearned & one repeated dance (Polish Week)
- Week 12: Argentine Tango & final unlearned Latin dance
- Week 13: Favorite Latin dance, favorite Ballroom dance & Freestyle

Couple	Week 1	Week 2	Week 3	Week 4	Week 5	Week 6	Week 7	Week 8		Week 9		Week 10		Week 11		Week 12		Week 13 Final		
Magdalena & Cezary	Group Mambo	Quickstep	Tango	Paso Doble	Viennese Waltz	Samba	Waltz	Rumba	Group Viennese Waltz	Foxtrot	Group Freestyle	American Smooth	Cha-Cha-Cha	Jive	Tango	Salsa	Argentine Tango	Jive	Argentine Tango	Freestyle
Mariusz & Magdalena	Cha-Cha-Cha	Group Swing	Jive	Foxtrot	Salsa	American Smooth	Rumba	Waltz	Group Viennese Waltz	Tango	Group Freestyle	Samba	Viennese Waltz	Quickstep	Cha-Cha-Cha	Argentine Tango	Paso Doble	Cha-Cha-Cha	Argentine Tango	Freestyle
Tamara & Łukasz	Group Mambo	Quickstep	Tango	Paso Doble	Viennese Waltz	Samba	Waltz	Rumba	Group Viennese Waltz	Foxtrot	Group Freestyle	American Smooth	Cha-Cha-Cha	Jive	Tango	Salsa	Argentine Tango			Tango
Robert & Anna	Cha-Cha-Cha	Group Swing	Jive	Foxtrot	Salsa	American Smooth	Rumba	Tango	Group Viennese Waltz	Paso Doble	Group Freestyle	Samba	Viennese Waltz	Quickstep	Cha-Cha-Cha					American Smooth
Elisabeth & Mario	Group Mambo	Quickstep	Tango	Paso Doble	Viennese Waltz	Samba	Waltz	Rumba	Group Viennese Waltz	Foxtrot	Group Freestyle	American Smooth	Cha-Cha-Cha							Rumba
Wojciech & Blanka	Cha-Cha-Cha	Group Swing	Jive	Foxtrot	Salsa	American Smooth	Rumba	Quickstep	Group Viennese Waltz	Paso Doble	Group Freestyle									Jive
Marek & Nina	Waltz	Group Swing	Jive	Foxtrot	Salsa	American Smooth	Cha-Cha-Cha	Quickstep	Group Viennese Waltz											Waltz
Łukasz & Anna	Waltz	Group Swing	Jive	Foxtrot	Salsa	American Smooth	Cha-Cha-Cha													Cha-Cha-Cha
Małgorzata & Robert	Group Mambo	Rumba	Tango	Paso Doble	Viennese Waltz	Samba														Paso Doble
Marina & Michał	Group Mambo	Rumba	Tango	Paso Doble	Viennese Waltz															Rumba
Tomasz & Kamila	Waltz	Group Swing	Jive	Foxtrot																Waltz
Katarzyna & Rafał	Group Mambo	Rumba	Tango																	Tango
Agnieszka & Żora	Group Mambo	Rumba																		Rumba
Michał & Katarzyna	Cha-Cha-Cha																			Cha-Cha-Cha

Highest scoring dance
Lowest scoring dance
Performed, but not scored

== Weekly results ==
The order is based on the judges' scores combined with the viewers' votes.

Order	Week 1	Week 2	Week 3	Week 4	Week 5	Week 6	Week 7	Week 8	Week 9	Week 10	Week 11	Week 12	Week 13 Final
1	Robert & Anna	Magdalena & Cezary	Magdalena & Cezary	Mariusz & Magdalena	Magdalena & Cezary	Mariusz & Magdalena	Magdalena & Cezary	Mariusz & Magdalena	Magdalena & Cezary	Magdalena & Cezary	Magdalena & Cezary	Magdalena & Cezary	Magdalena & Cezary
2	Wojciech & Blanka	Marina & Michał	Wojciech & Blanka	Elisabeth & Mario	Robert & Anna	Robert & Anna	Wojciech & Blanka	Elisabeth & Mario	Robert & Anna	Mariusz & Magdalena	Tamara & Łukasz	Mariusz & Magdalena	Mariusz & Magdalena
3	Marek & Nina	Elisabeth & Mario	Mariusz & Magdalena	Robert & Anna	Mariusz & Magdalena	Marek & Nina	Tamara & Łukasz	Magdalena & Cezary	Mariusz & Magdalena	Robert & Anna	Mariusz & Magdalena	Tamara & Łukasz	
4	Tomasz & Kamila	Małgorzata & Robert	Tamara & Łukasz	Magdalena & Cezary	Wojciech & Blanka	Magdalena & Cezary	Robert & Anna	Robert & Anna	Elisabeth & Mario	Tamara & Łukasz	Robert & Anna		
5	Mariusz & Magdalena	Katarzyna & Rafał	Robert & Anna	Małgorzata & Robert	Małgorzata & Robert	Elisabeth & Mario	Mariusz & Magdalena	Tamara & Łukasz	Tamara & Łukasz	Elisabeth & Mario			
6	Łukasz & Anna	Tamara & Łukasz	Marina & Michał	Marek & Nina	Tamara & Łukasz	Tamara & Łukasz	Elisabeth & Mario	Wojciech & Blanka	Wojciech & Blanka				
7	Michał & Katarzyna	Agnieszka & Żora	Marek & Nina	Łukasz & Anna	Łukasz & Anna	Wojciech & Blanka	Marek & Nina	Marek & Nina					
8			Tomasz & Kamila	Marina & Michał	Elisabeth & Mario	Łukasz & Anna	Łukasz & Anna						
9			Elisabeth & Mario	Tamara & Łukasz	Marek & Nina	Małgorzata & Robert							
10			Łukasz & Anna	Wojciech & Blanka	Marina & Michał								
11			Małgorzata & Robert	Tomasz & Kamila									
12			Katarzyna & Rafał										

This couple came in first place with the judges.
This couple came in first place with the judges and gained the highest number of viewers' votes.
This couple gained the highest number of viewers' votes.
This couple came in last place with the judges and gained the highest number of viewers' votes.
This couple came in last place with the judges.
This couple came in last place with the judges and was eliminated.
This couple was eliminated.
This couple won the competition.
This couple came in second in the competition.
This couple came in third in the competition.

== Audience voting results ==
Order	Week 1	Week 2	Week 3	Week 4	Week 5	Week 6	Week 7	Week 8	Week 9	Week 10	Week 11	Week 12	Week 13 Final
1	Mariusz & Magdalena (46.5)	Elisabeth & Mario (19.16)	Mariusz & Magdalena (32.09)	Mariusz & Magdalena (36.97)	Mariusz & Magdalena (33.79)	Mariusz & Magdalena (30.21)	Mariusz & Magdalena (35.97)	Mariusz & Magdalena (34.01)	Mariusz & Magdalena (35.25)	Mariusz & Magdalena (37.22)	Magdalena & Cezary (31.7)	Magdalena & Cezary (35.1)	Magdalena & Cezary (58.57)
2	Robert & Anna (23.79)	Magdalena & Cezary (17.72)	Robert & Anna (17.22)	Robert & Anna (14.91)	Robert & Anna (12.92)	Robert & Anna (16.94)	Magdalena & Cezary (16.43)	Robert & Anna (26.63)	Robert & Anna (21.6)	Robert & Anna (24.91)	Tamara & Łukasz (26.77)	Mariusz & Magdalena (32.98)	Mariusz & Magdalena (41.43)
3	Marek & Nina (9.51)	Marina & Michał (16.1)	Magdalena & Cezary (15.87)	Magdalena & Cezary (8.9)	Magdalena & Cezary (12.16)	Magdalena & Cezary (13.04)	Robert & Anna (15.17)	Magdalena & Cezary (12.04)	Magdalena & Cezary (14.51)	Magdalena & Cezary (16.23)	Mariusz & Magdalena (21.17)	Tamara & Łukasz (31.92)	
4	Wojciech & Blanka (6.91)	Małgorzata & Robert (14.95)	Wojciech & Blanka (6.54)	Marina & Michał (7.22)	Wojciech & Blanka (8.75)	Marek & Nina (11.01)	Wojciech & Blanka (7.62)	Elisabeth & Mario (8.16)	Elisabeth & Mario (11.74)	Tamara & Łukasz (11.33)	Robert & Anna (20.36)		
5	Łukasz & Anna (6.15)	Katarzyna & Rafał (13.53)	Łukasz & Anna (6.2)	Elisabeth & Mario (6.93)	Łukasz & Anna (7.36)	Tamara & Łukasz (7.49)	Elisabeth & Mario (7.56)	Tamara & Łukasz (7.16)	Tamara & Łukasz (8.5)	Elisabeth & Mario (10.31)			
6	Tomasz & Kamila (4.19)	Agnieszka & Żora (11.8)	Marek & Nina (4.73)	Tamara & Łukasz (6.35)	Małgorzata & Robert (6.38)	Elisabeth & Mario (6.5)	Tamara & Łukasz (6.83)	Marek & Nina (6.32)	Wojciech & Blanka (8.4)				
7	Michał & Katarzyna (2.95)	Tamara & Łukasz (6.74)	Małgorzata & Robert (4.19)	Małgorzata & Robert (4.15)	Elisabeth & Mario (5.87)	Łukasz & Anna (5.75)	Marek & Nina (5.43)	Wojciech & Blanka (5.68)					
8			Tamara & Łukasz (3.93)	Łukasz & Anna (4.31)	Tamara & Łukasz (5.7)	Wojciech & Blanka (5.33)	Łukasz & Anna (4.99)						
9			Marina & Michał (2.67)	Wojciech & Blanka (4.38)	Marek & Nina (4.37)	Małgorzata & Robert (3.73)							
10			Tomasz & Kamila (2.3)	Marek & Nina (3.58)	Marina & Michał (2.7)								
11			Elisabeth & Mario (2.15)	Tomasz & Kamila (2.3)									
12			Katarzyna & Rafał (2.11)										

== Guest performances ==
Episode	Date	Singer/Star	Song	Dancers
1	2 March 2008	STOMP		-
2	9 March 2008	Justyna Steczkowska	"It's Raining Men"	Group VOLT
2	9 March 2008	Justyna Steczkowska	"Tu i tu"	Group VOLT
3	16 March 2008	Tomasz Szymuś's Orchestra	"Greased Lightnin'"	Group VOLT
4	23 March 2008	Tomasz Szymuś's Orchestra	"I Will Follow Him"	Group VOLT
5	30 March 2008	Tomasz Szymuś's Orchestra	"Mujer Latina"	Group VOLT
6	6 April 2008	Magdalena Navarrete	"Rumba Del Bongo"	Group VOLT
6	6 April 2008	Tomasz Szymuś's Orchestra	"One"	Group VOLT
7	13 April 2008	Marina Łuczenko	"Respect"	-
7	13 April 2008	Tomasz Karolak & Dirty Track	"Anarchia"	Group VOLT
8	20 April 2008	Magda Femme & Iwona Węgrowska	"Jak diament"	Group VOLT
8	20 April 2008	Tomasz Szymuś's Orchestra	"Because We Can"	Group VOLT
9	27 April 2008	Asia Si	"Wake Up Older"	Group VOLT
10	4 May 2008	Edita Malovcic	"Because"	Group VOLT
10	4 May 2008	Edita Malovcic	"Better Brother"	Group VOLT
11	11 May 2008	Ewelina Flinta & Łukasz Zagrobelny	"Nie kłam, że kochasz mnie"	Group VOLT
11	11 May 2008	Olga Jackowska & 5th Element	"Lucciola"	-
12	18 May 2008	Nate James	"The Message"	Group VOLT
12	18 May 2008	Nate James	"Universal"	Group VOLT
13	25 May 2008	Zbigniew Wodecki	"Ty mnie, ja tobie"	Group VOLT
13	25 May 2008	Tamara Arciuch, Marina Łuczenko, Elisabeth Duda, Marek Kaliszuk, Wojciech Łozowski, Robert Janowski i Łukasz Zagrobelny	"Kasa i sex"	All couples

== Rating figures ==
Episode	Date	Official rating 4+	Share 4+	Share 16-39
1	2 March 2008	5 241 695	30,55%	31,12%
2	9 March 2008	5 230 103	31,23%	31,74%
3	16 March 2008	5 002 321	30,01%	28,97%
4	23 March 2008	4 180 084	26,90%	25,46%
5	30 March 2008	4 891 724	28,78%	28,83%
6	6 April 2008	4 666 217	27,89%	27,99%
7	13 April 2008	4 478 455	27,53%	28,04%
8	20 April 2008	4 674 258	27,85%	27,54%
9	27 April 2008	4 481 056	28,19%	29,27%
10	4 May 2008	4 666 341	29,04%	28,88%
11	11 May 2008	4 181 225	27,85%	26,29%
12	18 May 2008	4 452 341	27,71%	26,89%
13	25 May 2008	5 170 269	32,94%	33,17%
Average	Season 7	4 733 279	29,07%	28,88%
