= Krzysztof Gonciarz =

Polish internet creator, filmmaker, journalist and YouTuber

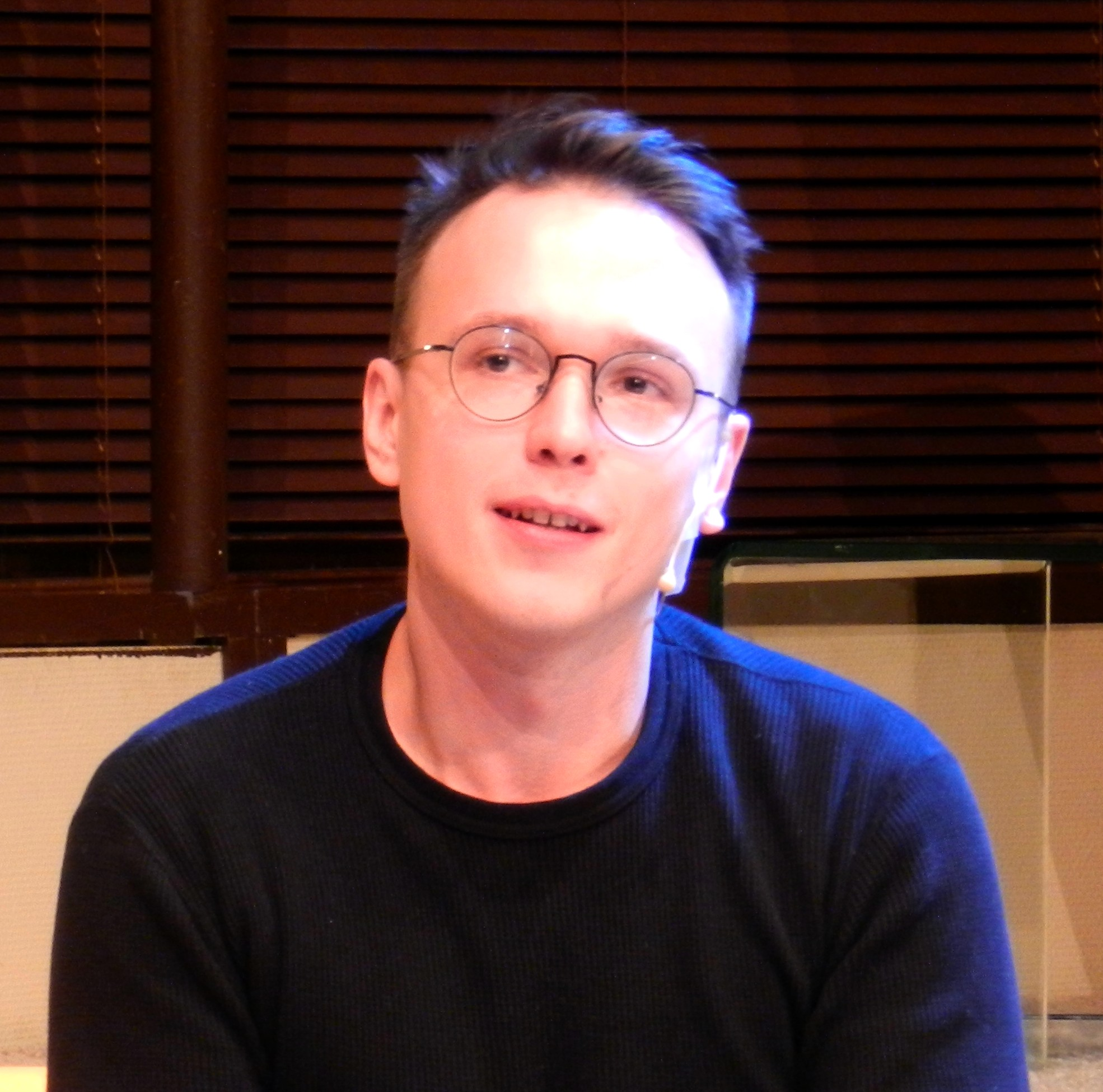
- Krzysztof Gonciarz in 2016.
- Born: Krzysztof Gonciarz; 19 June 1985 (age 41); Kraków, Poland
- Occupations: YouTuber; filmmaker; journalist

YouTube information
- Channels: Krzysztof Gonciarz; Zapytaj Beczkę; TheUwagaPies
- Years active: 2011–present
- Subscribers: 954 thousand (Krzysztof Gonciarz); 786 thousand (Zapytaj Beczkę); 157 thousand (TheUwagaPies)
- Views: 286.5 million (Krzysztof Gonciarz); 221.5 million (Zapytaj Beczkę); 19.3 million (TheUwagaPies)
- Last updated: 2 April 2024
- Website: krzysztofgonciarz.com

Krzysztof Jan Gonciarz (born 19 June 1985; Polish: [ˈkʂɘ̟ʂ.tɔf ˈjan ˈɡɔn.t͡ɕaʂ]) is an internet creator, filmmaker, journalist, and YouTuber, responsible of the channels Zapytaj Beczkę, Krzysztof Gonciarz, and TheUwagaPies on YouTube. He is the owner and creator of Japanese-based filmmaking company Tofu Media. He formerly worked as a journalist for Gry-Online.

== Biography ==
Krzysztof Gonciarz was born on 19 June 1985, in the city of Kraków, Poland. He graduated from the Jagiellonian University in Kraków, with a degree in the cultural studies.

From 2008 to 2012, he was a journalist for the Gry-Online internet website about the video games. In 2012, he voiced the character of Stuart Zurgo in the Polish-language dubbing of the video game Ratchet & Clank: Full Frontal Assault.

On 29 April 2011, Gonciarz had created his first channel on YouTube service, originally titled Wybuchające Beczki (translation from Polish: exploding barrels), and later renamed to Krzysztof Gonciarz. On 30 November 2011, he had created his second channel, originally titled TheBeeczka, where he began exclusively posting comedy videos. His first channel became host to his other videos, which includes vlogs, reviews, travel videos, and sponsored projects. In 2016, TheBeeczka was renamed to Zapytaj Beczkę (translation from Polish: ask the barrel).

In 2014, he moved to Tokyo, Japan, to the district of Shibuya, where he established his film production company, Tofu Media. In 2018, the company had opened its branch in Poland.

In 2014, he had started his third YouTube channel, titled TheUwagaPies, on which, together with Katarzyna Męcińska, he began posting English-language vlogs.

In 2016, in the partnership with semiconductor chip manufacturer Intel, he had created series of videos promoting the company's products. The series consisted of four videos filmed in different places across Asia. It included: More than one life filmed in Hong Kong, If You Were Born Japanese filmed in Tokyo, 48 hours in Seoul filmed in Seoul, South Korea, and Step One filmed in Taiwan.

In 2017, Krzysztof Gonciarz, had created a short film, titled The Breakup based on the Black Mirror television series, that was produced as part of the webseries Little Black Mirror. The series were produced for Netflix Polska by Jacek Ambrosiewicz, in collaboration with four Polish-language YouTube channels, which included Krzysztof Gonciarz, Emce (co-created by Huyen Pham and Marcin Nguyen), Grupa Filmowa Darwin (co-created by Jan Jurkowski and Marek Hucz), and Martin Stankiewicz. All four episodes were released on 19 January 2018, on the YouTube channel of their respective creators. The video produced by Gonciarz, featured him and Kasia Mecinski, and used realism and ordinary technology, such as a Panasonic Lumix DC-GH5 that emulates vlog aesthetics.

In February 2018, in the partnership with Eurosport television network, he had created the series of video showcasing the behind the scenes of the organization of the 2018 Winter Olympics in Pyeongchang County, South Korea. Following the success of the series, Eurosport had signed with him the contract, to make another series of videos during the 2020 Summer Olympics.

In 2019, the Manggha Museum of Japanese Art and Technology in Kraków, Poland hosted the art exhibition created by Gonciarz, titled Tokio 24. The exhibition included the 20-minute long video depicting the daily cycle of Tokyo, the room of "micro-delights", and the room of neon lights. It was available from 12 July 2019 to 29 September 2019. It became the most popular art exhibition hosted by the museum.

In 2021, Gonciarz again in the partnership with Eurosport, he had created the series of video showcasing the behind the scenes of the organization of the 2020 Summer Olympics in Tokyo, Japan.

== Controversies ==
In September 2023, three women accused Gonciarz of forcing them into taking narcotics as well as physical violence and sexist treatment. Soon after, model Hanna Koczewska, who was his former romantic partner, also accused him of such abuse. In response, Gonciarz published a statement, in which he apologised for his behaviour, and stated that he did not understand his behaviour at the time, and that he was currently undergoing therapy.

== Private life ==
Gonciarz lives in Shibuya, Tokyo, Japan, where he moved to in 2014. In 2023, he came out as bisexual.

== Filmography ==
Year	Title	Role	Notes	Ref.
2012	Ratchet & Clank: Full Frontal Assault	Stuart Zurgo	Polish-language dubbing	
2018	Little Black Mirror	Krzysztof	Miniseries; episode: "The Breakup"; also director and screenwriter	
2020	Kuba Wojewódzki	Himself (guest)	Talkshow; 1 episode	

== Books ==
- 2011: Wybuchające Beczki – zrozumieć gry wideo
- 2012: U Mad? The Internet's Guide to Idiots (published under pen name Christopher Gonciarz)
- 2012: WebShows: Sekrety Wideo w Internecie
- 2019: Rozum i Godność Człowieka (written together with Bartek Przybyszewski)
- 2021: Róża, a co chcesz wiedzieć? Część druga (anthology by multiple authors)
