= Marek Hucz =

Polish actor, filmmaker and YouTuber (born 1988)

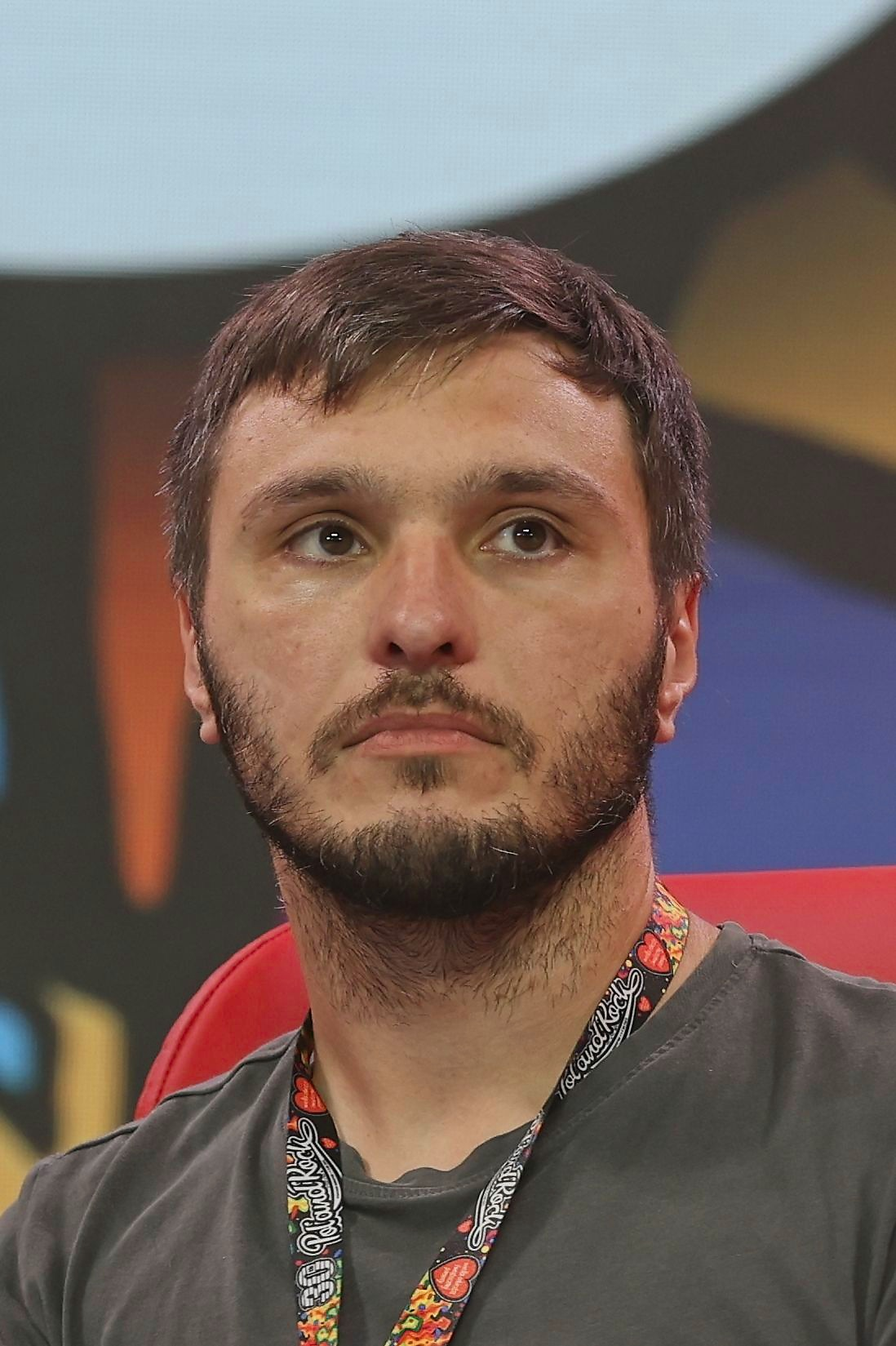
- Hucz in 2024.
- Born: 20 December 1988 (age 37); Bytom, Poland
- Occupations: Actor; Screenwriter; Producer
- Years active: 2009–present

Marek Piotr Hucz (Polish: [ˈma.rɛk ˈpjɔtr ˈxut͡ʂ]; born 20 December 1988) is a Polish stage, film and television actor, producer, and director. Together with Jan Jurkowski, he is a co-founder of Darwin Film Group which publishes its productions on YouTube.

== Biography ==
Marek Hucz was born on 20 December 1988 in Bytom, Poland. He graduated high school in Zabrze, where he co-founded theatre group 3xM, and later attended postgraduate acting classes in Kraków. In 2013, he graduated in acting from the National Academy of Theatre Arts in Kraków. While studying, he debuted on stage of the Bagatela Theatre in Warsaw. He also performed in Łaźnia Nowa Theatre in Kraków, and TrzyRzecze Theatre in Warsaw.

In 2012, together with his classmate, Jan Jurkowski, he founded the Darwin Film Group, which begun producing short films, such as series Wielkie Konflikty published on YouTube. Another popular series produced by them included Szorty Darwina, Dziennik Internetowy, and Groovy Movie, among others. In 2016, they filmed television series Wielkie Teorie Darwina for TVN, and also released some of their miniseries on its streaming service, Player.pl. In 2017, they made episode "1%" for web-miniseries Little Black Mirror, as part of promotional campaign of Netflix television series Black Mirror. In 2021, they produced another series for TVN, titled Misja.

In 2019, Hucz and Jurkowski published book To (nie) koniec świata, in which they wrote about their works and unproduced stories of the Darwin Film Group.

== Filmography ==
Year	Title	Role	Notes
2012	Days of Honor	Student	Television series; episode: "Kanał" (no. 60)
2012–2013	Wielkie Budowle	Various roles	Webseries; 5 episodes; also screenwriter and producer
2012–2014	Mistrz Motyl	Tamagoczi	Webseries; 5 episodes; also screenwriter and producer
2013	Człowiek bez wartości	—N/a	Short film; second director
2013	Wielkie Pytania Polskie	Various roles	Webseries; 8 episodes; lso screenwriter and producer
2014	Okruchy śmierci i życia	Narrator	Documentary film
2014	Videoblogi Ludwika	Priest	Webseries; episode no. 7; also screenwriter and producer
2014	Zaginione poematy Juliusza Słowackiego	Juliusz Słowacki	Webseries; 4 episodes; also screenwriter and producer
2014–2019	Wielkie Konflikty	Various roles	Webseries; 32 episodes; also screenwriter, producer, and director
2015	Pielęgniarki		Television series; episode no. 86
2015–2021	Szorty Darwina	Various roles	Webseries; 29 episodes; also screenwriter, producer and director
2016	Wielkie Teorie Darwina	Various roles	Television series; 5 episodes; also screenwriter and producer
2016–2022	Zakazane Spoty Darwina	Various roles	Webseries; 14 episodes; also screenwriter and producer
2017	Little Black Mirror	Nurse	Webseries; also screenwriter and producer; episode: "1%" (no. 1)
2017	W rytmie serca	PE teacher	Television series; episode: "Kto tu kłamie?" (no. 2)
2017–2022	Groovy Movie	Various roles	Webseries; 5 episodes; also screenwriter and producer
2019	Mały Grand Hotel	Gold Paulini	Television series; episode no. 6
2020	Ainbo: Spirit of the Amazon	Vaca	Television series; voice; Polish-language dubbing
2020–2022	Byli sobie Ludzie	Speaker #2	Webseries 15 episodes; also screenwriter and producer
2021	The God of the Internet	Himself	Feature film
2021	Misja	Arkadiusz Słowacki	Television series; 10 episodes; also screenwriter and producer
2022–2024	Z Archiwum N	God	Webseries; 12 episodes; also screenwriter and producer
2023	Camera Cafe. Nowe parzenie	Stripier	Television series; episode no. 22
2023	Friends	Dorota's client	Television series; episode no. 281
2024	Na sygnale	Damian	Television series; episode: "Zaginiony" (no. 647)

== Stage credits ==
Year	Title	Role	Director	Theatre
2009	Woyzeck		Andrzej Domalik	Bagatela Theatre (Warsaw)
2010	A Streetcar Named Desire	Tax collector	Dariusz Starczewski	Bagatela Theatre (Warsaw)
2010	Kubuś i reszta		Ewa Kaim	National Academy of Theatre Arts (Kraków)
2010	Nadobnisie i koczkodany	Mandelbaum	Adam Nawojczyk	National Academy of Theatre Arts (Kraków)
2011	Ja-jestem-nim		Szymon Kaczmarek	National Academy of Theatre Arts (Kraków)
2012	The Brothers Karamazov	Mitia	Anna Leśniak	National Academy of Theatre Arts (Kraków)
2012	Healter Skelter		Paweł Świątek	National Academy of Theatre Arts (Kraków)
2013	Smutki tropików		Paweł Świątek	Łaźnia Nowa Theatre (Kraków)
2016	Dogs Barking	Neil	Maciej Wiktor	TrzyRzecze Theatre (Warsaw)

== Bibliography ==
- 2019: To (nie) koniec świata (together with Jan Jurkowski; Altenberg; ISBN 978-83-952354-6-7)

== Awards ==
Year	Award	Category	Nominated work	Result	Ref.
2018	Grand Video Awards	Entertainment	Gwiezdny Szeryf	Won	
