= Iwona Wszołkówna =

Polish actress (born 1975)

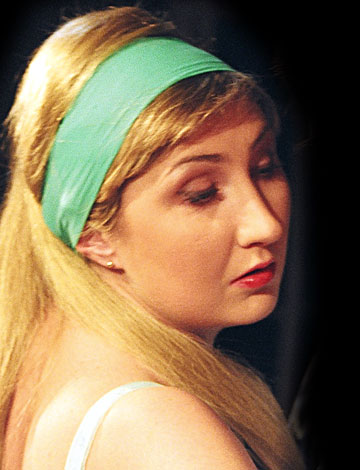
Iwona Wszołkówna

Iwona Wszołkówna (Iwona Wszołek) (born April 13, 1975) is a Polish film and theater actress.

== Biography ==
In 2000, she graduated from the AST National Academy of Theatre Arts in Kraków. In the same year, she started working at the Współczesny Theater in Warsaw. Married to the director Jerzy Bogajewicz, has two children: son Antoni (born 2005) and daughter Tina (born 2007).

== Filmography ==
- 2003: Kasia i Tomek – Regina
- 2003: Zaginiona
- 2004: Camera Café – Asia
- 2004: Kryminalni – waitress Lucyna
- 2004: The Wedding (Polish: Wesele) – Januszewska, senior bridesmaid
- 2005: Anioł Stróż – Kamila
- 2005: Boża podszewka II – Frida
- 2005–2009: Niania – Jola, an employee of Jarosiński's wedding dress salon, a friend of Frania
- 2006: Ale się kręci
- 2006: Just Love Me (Polish: Tylko mnie kochaj) – neighbor Julii
- 2006: 39 i pół – Macińska
- 2011: Wszyscy kochają Romana – Ola, a friend Doroty
- 2011: Pokaż kotku, co masz w środku – Janina Zientara, wife of the policeman Zygmunt
- 2014: The Mighty Angel (Polish: Pod mocnym aniołem) – alcoholic Joanna
- 2015: True Law (Polish: Prawo Agaty) – Jola Kruk
