= Jan Jurkowski =

Polish actor, filmmaker and YouTuber (born 1989)

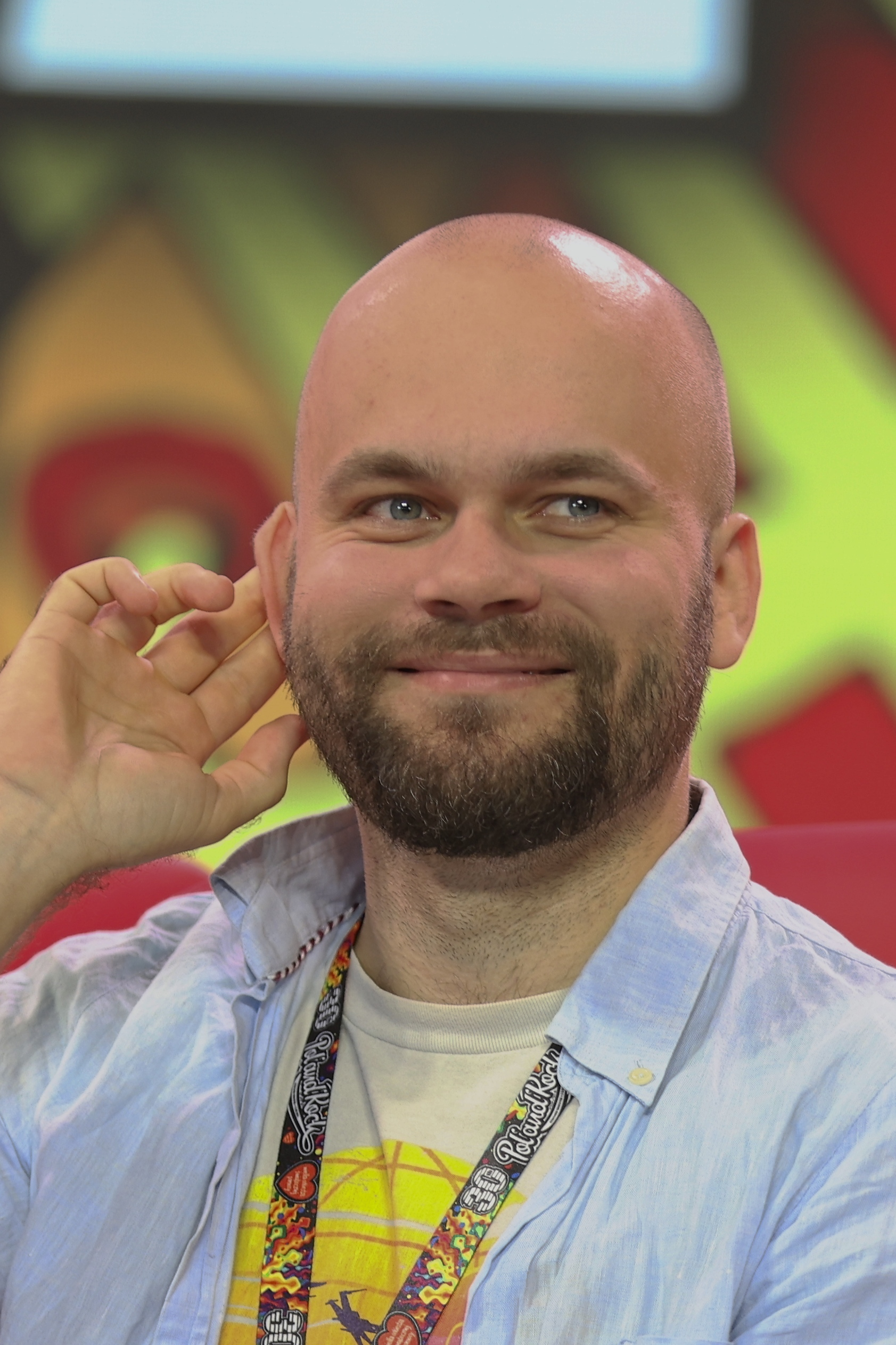
- Jurkowski in 2024.
- Born: 1989 (age 36–37)
- Occupations: Actor; director; screenwriter; editor
- Years active: 2009–present

Jan Jurkowski (Polish: [ˈjan jurˈkɔf.ski]; born 1989) is a Polish stage, film and television actor, director, screenwriter, and editor. Together with Marek Hucz, he is a co-founder of Darwin Film Group which publishes its productions on YouTube.

== Biography ==
Jan Jurkowski was born in 1989. In 2013, he graduated acting from the National Academy of Theatre Arts in Kraków. While studying, he debuted on stage of the Bagatela Theatre in Warsaw in 2009. In 2011, he performed in an audioplay of Polish Radio based on The Wedding. In 2013, he began performing in the Wojciech Bogusławski Theatre in Kalisz, and in 2015, in the Łaźnia Nowa Theatre in Kraków.

In 2012, together with his classmate, Marek Hucz, he founded the Darwin Film Group, which begun producing short films publishef on YouTube, such as series Wielkie Konflikty, Szorty Darwina, Dziennik Internetowy, and Groovy Movie, among others. In 2016, they filmed television series Wielkie Teorie Darwina for TVN, and also released some of their miniseries on its streaming service, Player.pl. In 2017, they made episode "1%" for web-miniseries Little Black Mirror, as part of promotional campaign of Netflix television series Black Mirror. In 2021, they produced another series for TVN, titled Misja.

In 2019, Jurkowski and Hucz published book To (nie) koniec świata, in which they wrote about their works and unproduced stories of the Darwin Film Group.

== Filmography ==
Year	Title	Role	Notes
2012–2013	Patologiczna Krawcowa	Pathological Seamstress	Webseries; voice; 10 episodes; also director, screenwriter, and editor
2012–2013	Wielkie Budowle	Various roles	Webseries; 5 episodes; also director, screenwriter, and editor
2013	Mistrz Motyl	Techniczny	Webseries; 2 episodes; also director, screenwriter, and editor
2013	Wielkie Pytania Polskie	Ludwik Montgomery	Webseries; 25 episodes; also director, screenwriter, and editor
2013–2014	Videoblogi Ludwika	Ludwik Montgomery	Webseries; 11 episodes; also director, screenwriter, and editor
2014–2019	Wielkie Konflikty	Various roles	Webseries; 31 episodes; also director, screenwriter, and editor
2015–2021	Shorty Darwina	Various roles	Webseries; 28 episodes; also director, screenwriter, and editor
2015–2024	Dziennik Internetowy	Various roles	Webseries; 13 episodes; also director, screenwriter, and editor
2016	Wielkie Teorie Darwina	Various roles	Television series; 5 episodes; also director, screenwriter, and editor
2016–2021	Zakazane Spoty Darwina	Various roles	Webseries; 14 episodes; also director, screenwriter, and editor
2017	Dzielni chłopcy	Football fan	Television play
2017	Little Black Mirror	Mr. Aboth	Webseries; episode: "1%" (no. 1); also director, screenwriter, and editor
2017	Volta	Paweł	Feature film
2017–2022	Groovy Movie	Various roles	Webseries; 5 episodes; also director, screenwriter, and editor
2018	My Strange Older Brother	Brother	Short film; voice
2019	Bajki Darwina	Various roles	Webseries; 2 episodes; also director, screenwriter, and editor
2019	Malibu Rescue		Television series; voice; Polish-language dubbing
2019	Mały Grand Hotel	Gold Paulini	Television series; episode no. 6
2020	Ainbo: Spirit of the Amazon	Pancho	Television series; voice; Polish-language dubbing
2020	I'm Here	Son-in-law	Short film; voice
2020–2022	Byli sobie Ludzie	Speaker #1	Webseries; 15 episodes; also director, screenwriter, and editor
2021	Misja	Arkadiusz Słowacki	Television series; 10 episodes; also screenwriter and producer
2022–2023	Z Archiwum N	Various roles	Webseries; 2 episodes; also director, screenwriter, and editor
2023	Camera Cafe. Nowe parzenie	Police officer	Television series; episode no. 22
2024	Jak nie zabiłem swojego ojca i jak bardzo tego żałuję		Television play
2024	Seasons	Screenwriter	Feature film

== Stage credits ==
Year	Title	Role	Director	Theatre
2009	Woyzeck	Andrzej Domalik		Bagatela Theatre (Warsaw)
2010	Nadobnisie i koczkodany	Mandelbaum	Adam Nawojczyk	National Academy of Theatre Arts (Kraków)
2011	Ja-jestem-nim		Szymon Kaczmarek	National Academy of Theatre Arts (Kraków)
2011	Witkacy – Jedyne wyjście	Nadrazil Żywiołowicz	Marcin Kuźmiński	Juliusz Słowacki Theatre (Kraków)
2011	Witkacy – Jedyne wyjście	Izydor	Marcin Kuźmiński	Juliusz Słowacki Theatre (Kraków)
2012	Healter Skelter		Paweł Świątek	National Academy of Theatre Arts (Kraków)
2013	Versus	Leszek Pękalski	Szymon Kaczmarek	Wojciech Bogusławski Theatre (Kalisz)
2014	Diabełek Pawełek	Diabełek Pawełek	Mikołaj Mikołajczyk	Wojciech Bogusławski Theatre (Kalisz)
2014	Fantazy	Jan	Maciej Podstawny	Wojciech Bogusławski Theatre (Kalisz)
2014	The Government Inspector	Piotr Bobczyński	Jacek Jabrzyk	Aleksander Węgierko Drama Theatre (Białystok)
2014	The Master and Margarita	Azazello	Magdalena Miklasz	Malabar Hotel Theatre (Warsaw)
2014	The Master and Margarita	Pontius Pilate	Magdalena Miklasz	Malabar Hotel Theatre (Warsaw)
2014	The Master and Margarita	Grigory Danilovich Rimsky	Magdalena Miklasz	Malabar Hotel Theatre (Warsaw)
2015	Pelcia, czyli jak żyć, żeby nie odnieść sukcesu		Joanna Szczepkowska	Łaźnia Nowa Theatre (Kraków)
2015	Skowyt		Maciej Podstawn	Łaźnia Nowa Theatre (Kraków)
2019	Sokrates	Socrates	Joanna Szczepkowska	Na Dole Theatre (Warsaw)
2020	Lem vs. P.K. Dick	Stanisław Lem	Mateusz Pakuła	Łaźnia Nowa Theatre (Kraków)
2023	Jak nie zabiłem swojego ojca i jak bardzo tego żałuję		Mateusz Pakuła	Łaźnia Nowa Theatre (Kraków)
2024	The Play That Goes Wrong	Chris	Janusz Szydłowsk	Kraków Variété Theatre (Kraków)

== Audioplay credits ==
Year	Title	Role	Director	Radio
2011	The Wedding		Andrzej Seweryn	Polish Radio
2016	The Merchant of Venice	Gratiano	Mariusz Malec	Polish Radio

== Bibliography ==
- 2019: To (nie) koniec świata (together with Marek Hucz; Altenberg; ISBN 978-83-952354-6-7)

== Awards ==
Year	Award	Category	Nominated work	Result	Ref.
2014	Jacek Woszczerowicz Award	—N/a	Versus (play directed by Szymon Kaczmarek)	Won	
2018	Grand Video Awards	Entertainment	Gwiezdny Szeryf	Won	
