= Niania =

Polish comedy television series

- Genre: Sitcom
- Based on: The Nanny by Fran Drescher and Peter Marc Jacobson
- Screenplay by: Bartosz Kurowski; Marcin Pieszczyk; Beata Pasek; Małgorzata Sikorska-Miszczuk; Agata Węgrzynowska
- Directed by: Jerzy Bogajewicz
- Starring: Agnieszka Dygant; Tomasz Kot; Adam Ferency; Tamara Arciuch; Maria Maciejowska; Roger Karwiński; Emilia Stachurska; Elżbieta Jarosik; Barbara Wrzesińska; Krystyna Rutkowska-Ulewicz; Iwona Wszołkówna
- Theme music composer: Łukasz Targosz, Maciej Pawłowski, Robert Docew
- Opening theme: "Niania", written by Łukasz Targosz, performed by Andrzej Lampert
- Country of origin: Poland
- Original language: Polish
- No. of seasons: 6
- No. of episodes: 135 (list of episodes)

Production
- Producers: TVN; Dariusz Gąsiorowski; Marzena Bober; Renata Walczyk
- Camera setup: Multi-camera

Original release
- Network: TVN
- Release: 10 September 2005 – 24 October 2009

Niania is a Polish comedy television series directed by Jerzy Bogajewicz, which aired on TVN from 10 September 2005 to 24 October 2009. It was based on the American original The Nanny licensed by CBS, which aired in the 1990s.

== Production ==
The script for the series was based on the original version of the script written by Peter Marc Jacobson and Fran Drescher, the lead character (Fran Fine) in the American version. The title character in the Polish adaptation was played by Agnieszka Dygant. Each episode featured a guest appearance by a well-known figure from the world of show business, altogether nearly 300 celebrities.

The series was shot from 19 July 2005 to 25 February 2009 at the Farat Film recording studio. A total of 134 out of 147 original episodes were shot, which were divided into 9 seasons of 15 episodes each. The 100th episode of the series was produced in autumn 2008, which was an opportunity for the creators of the original to come to Poland. The series gained the recognition of Fran Drescher, as well as the main producer, Sony Columbia Pictures Television International, which evaluated the Polish adaptation as the version most similar to the original among all the licences granted.

The series' audience reached over 4 million viewers. Niania was twice awarded a Telekamera in the "best comedy series" category: in 2007 (197,947 votes) and 2008, and also came second in 2009.

In 2019, Polsat Television bought the exclusive rights to show the series from TVN. It aired on Super Polsat from 10 June 2019 to 8 February 2020, on Polsat CC Extra from 3 March 2020, and on Polsat Seriale and Polsat Café from 6 April.

== Plot ==
Franciszka Maj (Agnieszka Dygant), 30, loses her job at the bridal shop run by her would-be fiancé, Daniel Jarosiński (Wojciech Medyński/Artur Dziurman). As a cosmetics saleswoman she offers the goods at the Skalski family's house, at a time when the search for a babysitter for the children of a wealthy television producer, Maksymilian (Tomasz Kot), is on. She eventually gets the job, becoming the nanny of the widower's three children: the reserved Zuzia (Emilia Stachurska), the rascally Adaś (Roger Karwiński) and the shy Małgosia (Maria Maciejowska).

While taking care of the children, the employer and the nanny fall in love with each other. Their relationship is all the more difficult because they share class differences and views on various issues, and often cannot get along. The family is accompanied by a butler, Konrad (Adam Ferency), who often demonstrates greater shrewdness and intelligence than his employer. Maximilian's co-worker Karolina Łapińska (Tamara Arciuch), who unsuccessfully seeks Skalski's affection, is constantly the object of the butler's malicious jokes and insults.

=== Episodes ===
Series	Episodes	Originally released		Average audience
Series	Episodes	First released	Last released	Average audience
1	15	10 September 2005	24 December 2005	3,309,928
2	15	4 March 2006	10 June 2006	3,171,422
3	15	9 August 2006	16 December 2006	3,470,578
4	15	10 March 2007	16 June 2007	3,036,724
5	15	8 September 2007	15 December 2007	3,327,784
6	15	1 March 2008	7 June 2008	2,962,917
7	15	6 September 2008	20 December 2008	3,068,559
8	14	7 March 2009	25 April 2009	2,676,236
9	15	2 May 2009; 12 September 2009	23 May 2009; 24 October 2009	2,676,236

== Characters ==
=== Main ===
Franciszka Zofia Skalska (née Maj, born 23 December 1975) (Agnieszka Dygant) is a 30-year-old nasal-voiced woman, who works for Mr. Maksymilian Skalski as the nanny to his three children: Małgosia, Adaś and Zuzia. She is the daughter of Teresa and Stefan Maj and granddaughter of Apolonia Lipiec. After several years, she married Maks, to whom she gave birth to twins, Maria Magdalena and Franciszek Józef.

Maksymilian Maria Skalski (Tomasz Kot) is a 40-year-old rich TV producer who becomes a workaholic after the death of his wife Anna. He is honest, though sometimes distant and ironic. His feelings for Frania Maj developed, but the man tried to hide it. He is the son of Janusz and Elżbieta Skalski, brother of Joanna (Katarzyna Figura) and Aleks (Rafał Królikowski), and step-brother of Zdenka (Katarzyna Skrzynecka). His grandmother is Matylda Skalska (Barbara Krafftówna).

Małgosia Skalska (Maria Maciejowska) is Maks's oldest child. Initially shy and morbidly insecure, under Frania's influence she turned into a feisty, joyful girl – she started going to parties, dating boys, and making her first serious decisions, which she always shared with Frania. She married photomodel Michał (Zhora Korolyov).

Adaś Maks Skalski (Roger Karwiński) is Maks's son, with whom no nanny could make contact after his mother's death, until Frania Maj came along. He took an interest in girls, loved to mess around and tease his sisters.

Zuzia Skalska (Emilia Stachurska) is Maks's youngest child. She went to therapy because she was closed off and introverted. Thanks to Frania, she gradually opens up. The nanny is a source of maternal warmth for her, which Zuzia really missed after the loss of her mother.

Karolina Łapińska (Tamara Arciuch) is a 30-year-old business partner of Maks. She is elegant and classy, but stiff, pretentious and conceited. She did not like children and tried to hide it. She saw Frania as a rival in attempts to win Maks's affections. She despised Konrad for years, but a year after Maks married Frania, she married the butler and became pregnant with him. She is the daughter of a sailor and sister of Karol (Arkadiusz Brykalski), a doctor at the University of Gdańsk.

Konrad (Adam Ferency) is a butler. His father worked in the British embassy and was also a butler. He himself graduated from Jagiellonian University. An extremely intelligent and witty commentator on family life in the Skalski's house. Although he is Maks's employee, he is often like a father or a friend to him, always offering him advice. At first he is the only one to notice the feelings developing between Frania and Maks, so he makes subtle allusions to them. He is friends with Frania, for years he despised Karolina Łapińska, but a year after his boss married Frania, he married Karolina. In the last episode of the series it was revealed that they are expecting a baby.

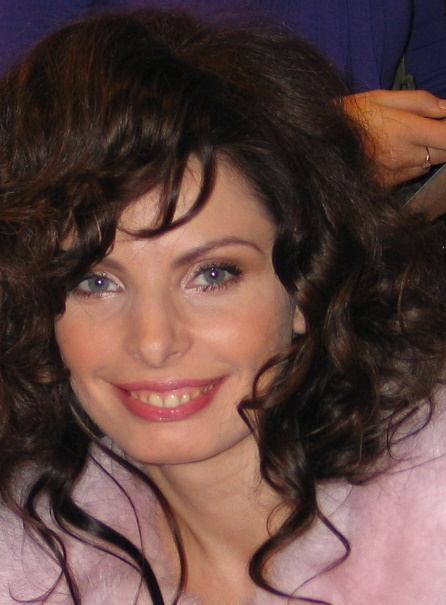
Agnieszka Dygant as Frania Maj

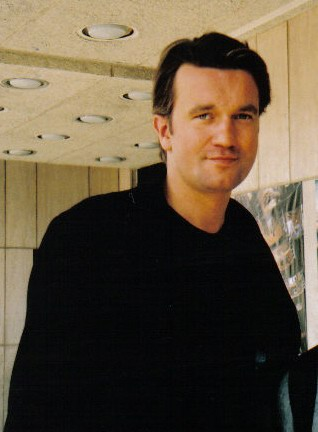
Tomasz Kot as Maks Skalski

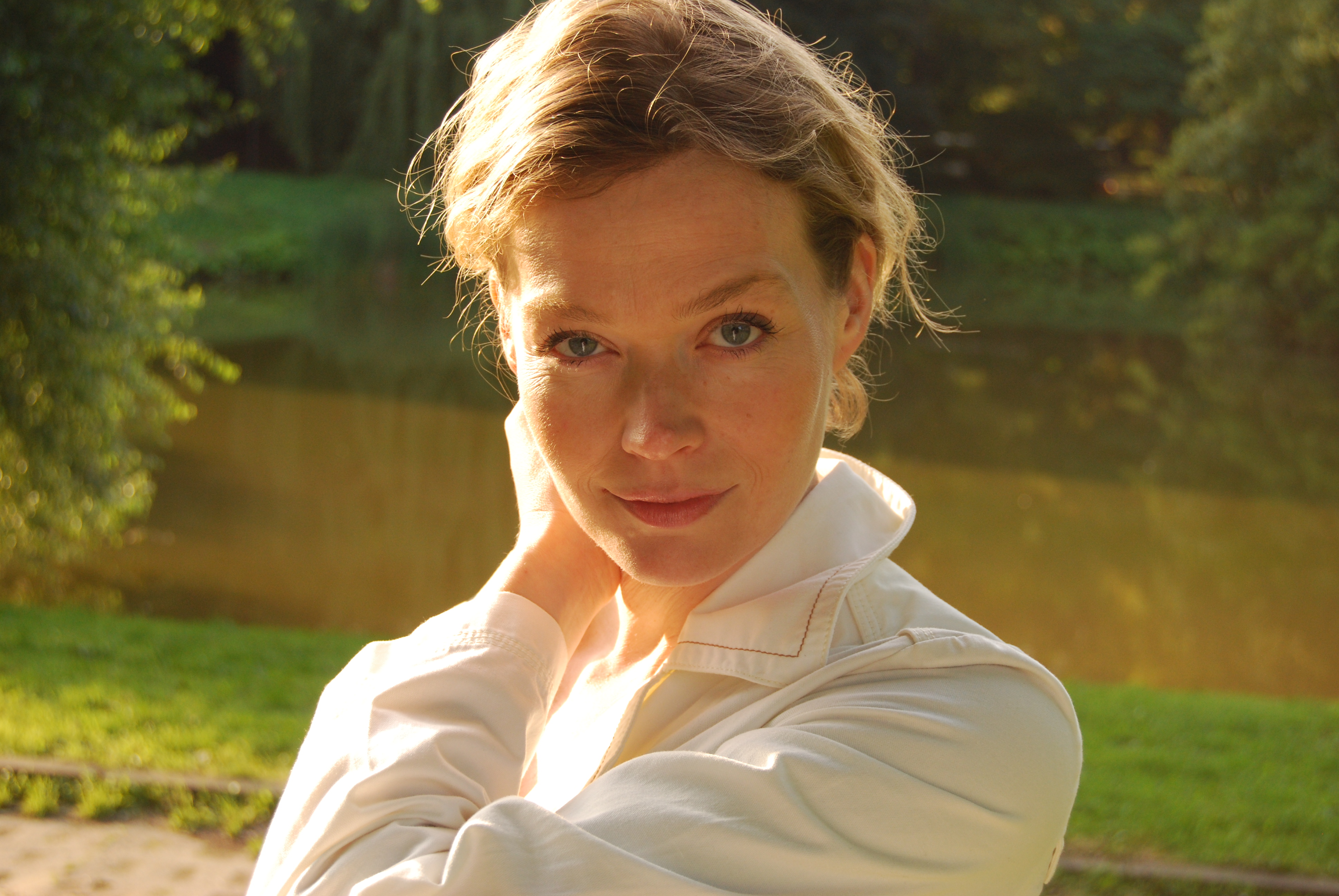
Tamara Arciuch as Karolina

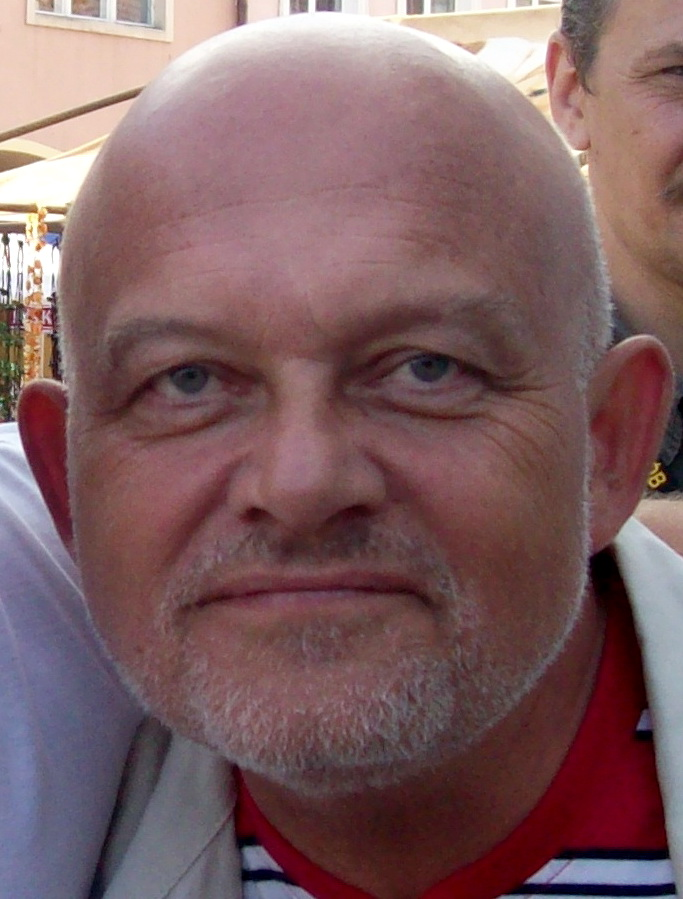
Adam Ferency as Konrad

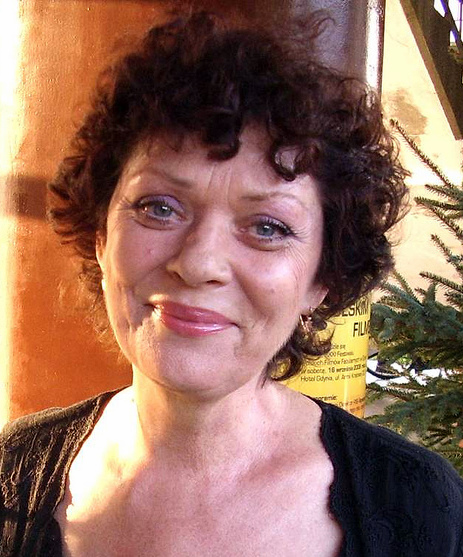
Elżbieta Jarosik as Teresa Maj

=== Secondary ===
Teresa Kwiryna Maj (née Lipiec) (Elżbieta Jarosik) is Frania's 50-year-old mother. Delighted with Frania's new job, she sees promising prospects. She dreams that Frania will settle down (she mainly sees Maks as her husband) and wants to have grandchildren. In an episode of bank robbery, Teresa talks about her hypoglycaemia, which explains why she eats a hearty meal or thinks about food in almost every scene. She comes from the town of Tłuszcz.

Stefan Maj (Marian Opania) is Teresa's husband and Frania's father. He is on a disability pension. His favourite pastime is watching television.

Apolonia Lipiec (née Bąk, born 1933) (Barbara Wrzesińska/Krystyna Rutkowska-Ulewicz) is Frania's grandmother. She watches over her granddaughter, sometimes excessively. She has dementia. Her fiancé is Czesław (Stanisław Tym), a retired military officer.

Jolka Ząbkowska (Iwona Wszołkówna) is Frania's best friend since school times. She lives with her parents in Praga district, on Ząbkowska Street. Not very intelligent and not very bright, but nice and open. Unsuccessfully searches for a life partner.

Character	Original character	Actor
Frania Maj	Fran Fine	Agnieszka Dygant
Maks Skalski	Maxwell Sheffield	Tomasz Kot
Konrad	Niles	Adam Ferency
Karolina Łapińska	C. C. Babcock	Tamara Arciuch
Małgosia Skalska	Margaret Sheffield	Maria Maciejowska
Adaś Skalski	Brighton Sheffield	Roger Karwiński
Zuzia Skalska	Grace Sheffield	Emilia Stachurska
Teresa Maj	Sylvia Fine	Elżbieta Jarosik
Apolonia Lipiec	Yetta Rosenberg	Barbara Wrzesińska/Krystyna Rutkowska-Ulewicz
Jolka Ząbkowska	Val Toriello	Iwona Wszołkówna

== Opening credits ==
Opening sequence describes (with the main characters in animated form) the story of how Frania Maj went from being fired from the bridal shop by Daniel Jarosiński to becoming the nanny of the Skalski's children.

The animated opening sequence begins with Frania Maj walking into the bridal shop, only to be kicked out by an unseen Daniel Jarosiński. Then, she hitches a ride in a tram, crosses the bridge from Praga, Warsaw to Centrum and arrives at the Skalski's mansion. Maksymilian Skalski opens the door and observes Frania. Then, he pulls her inside and she falls into the flower pot. Konrad dusts her off and puts a cap on her head that reads Niania. Frania whistles for Małgosia, Adaś, and Zuzia and the four of them form a conga line. Karolina arrives at the door and Frania bumps the door with her hip to close it in her face. Finally, the Skalskis, Konrad and Frania gather on the couch for a group picture. Interestingly, above the sofa on the wall there is a stylized name of the broadcaster, TVN television. However, when Fran presses the camera's button, smoke emits from the camera, covering the entire group and the broadcaster's name in dust and messing up clothes.
