= Run Boy Run (film) =

2013 German-Polish-French film by Pepe Danquart

- Film poster
- German: Lauf Junge lauf
- Directed by: Pepe Danquart
- Written by: Heinrich Hadding; Pepe Danquart
- Based on: Run, Boy, Run by Uri Orlev
- Produced by: Uwe Spiller
- Starring: Andrzej Tkacz; Kamil Tkacz; Zbigniew Zamachowski
- Cinematography: Daniel Gottschalk
- Edited by: Richard Marizy
- Music by: Stéphane Moucha
- Release date: November 5, 2013 (Cottbus Film Festival)
- Running time: 107 minutes
- Countries: Germany; France; Poland
- Languages: German; Polish; Yiddish; Russian

Run Boy Run (German: Lauf Junge lauf; Polish: Biegnij, chłopcze, biegnij; French: Cours sans te retourner) also titled Escape From Warsaw in the UK is a 2013 German-Polish-French co-production of the film director and producer Pepe Danquart. The film is an adaptation of the 2000 novel Run, Boy, Run by Uri Orlev, based on the life of Yoram Fridman (1934–2017 (Rishon LeZion)), who as an eight-year-old Jewish boy in 1942, escaped the Warsaw Ghetto and survived, largely on his own, for the next three years in rural Nazi German-occupied Poland.

The screenplay is by Heinrich Hadding and Pepe Danquart. The film was also partially shot in Riga, Latvia. The world premiere of the film took place on November 5, 2013, at the FilmFestival Cottbus in Germany.

== Cast ==
- Andrzej Tkacz as Srulik Frydman / Jurek Staniak
- Kamil Tkacz as Srulik Frydman / Jurek Staniak
- Zbigniew Zamachowski as Hersch Frydman, Father of Srulik
- Mirosław Baka as Mateusz Wróbel
- Grażyna Szapołowska as Ewa Staniak
- Przemysław Sadowski as Kowalski
- Olgierd Łukaszewicz as Doctor Żurawski
- Izabela Kuna as Kowalska
- Elisabeth Duda as Magda Janczyk
- Jeanette Hain as Mrs Herman
- Rainer Bock as SS Officer
- Itay Tiran as Mosze
- Katarzyna Bargiełowska as Riwa Fridman, mother of Srulik
- Urs Rechn as SS Scharführer
- Julia Stachowicz as Sofia
- Grażyna Błęcka-Kolska as Mania Wróbel
- Lech Dyblik as Fisherman
