= Legenda Tatr =

1995 film directed by Wojciech Solarz

- Directed by: Wojciech Solarz
- Written by: Wojciech Solarz
- Cinematography: Zbigniew Wichłacz
- Edited by: Elżbieta Kurkowska
- Music by: Wojciech Kilar
- Release date: 1995
- Running time: 106 minutes
- Country: Poland
- Language: Polish

Legenda Tatr is a Polish historical film written and directed by Wojciech Solarz. It was released in 1995.

== Cast ==
- Rafał Królikowski as Andrzej
- Ryszard Sobolewski as blacksmith Fakla
- Andrzej Kozak as Bartek Zwyrtała
- Jerzy Trela as Mudroń
- Krzysztof Jasiński as harnaś Nowobilski
- Tomasz Schimscheiner as Franek Walczaków

Source.
