= Przemysław Branny =

Polish singer and actor (1970–2026)

- Przemysław Branny (2006)
- Born: 24 December 1970; Český Těšín, Czechoslovakia
- Died: 3 October 2026 (aged 55)
- Education: AST National Academy of Theatre Arts in Kraków
- Occupations: Actor; singer
- Awards: Cross of Merit (Bronze) Cross of Merit (Silver) Gloria Artis Medal for Merit to Culture (Bronze)
- Website: www.branny.pl

Przemysław Branny (24 December 1970 – 3 October 2026) was a Polish actor and singer.

== Life and career ==
=== Early life and education ===
Przemysław Branny was born on 24 December 1970. He completed his primary and middle school education at Polish-language schools in Czechoslovakia. As a child, he played several lead roles with the Polish Stage of the theatre in Český Těšín. From 1989 to 1993, he studied at the Ludwik Solski State Theatre School in Kraków. Branny completed his studies with graduation performances directed by Krystian Lupa and Jerzy Stuhr.

=== Theatre ===
Branny made his debut at the age of eight on the stage of the theatre in Český Těšín, playing the role of Wawrzuś in the play Historia żółtej ciżemki (The Story of the Yellow Shoe). During his studies, he performed in musical productions (STU Theatre – Plac Merkurego; School Stage – Dolina Ronsewal).

He was permanently associated with the Bagatela Theatre in Kraków., in which he played roles such as Kantor in the production The Magician of Lublin (music by Z. Konieczny, directed by J. Szurmiej), Perchik (Fiddler on the Roof, directed by J. Szurmiej), and Dick (the musical The Secret Garden, directed by J. Szydłowski); he also appeared in the two-person musical comedy Wystarczy noc (directed by W. Śmigasiewicz) and The Trial (directed by W. Śmigasiewicz). He also performed dramatic roles, including Malcolm (Macbeth, directed by W. Śmigasiewicz), Filip (*Dożywocie*, directed by T. Obara), Caramanchel (Zielony Gil, directed by T. Dutkiewicz), Tim (Noises Off, directed by K. Orzechowski), Andrzej (Three Sisters, directed by A. Domalik), Mitch (A Streetcar Named Desire, directed by M. Meszaros), and Kopyrda (Hulajgęba, based on Ferdydurke by Witold Gombrowicz, directed by W. Śmigasiewicz). Further, he played a lead role in the production Takie większe Wesele (based on the work of Tadeusz Nowak, directed by Andrzej Róg), organized by Loch Camelot – among other venues, at Wolnica Square in Kraków – on 15 September 2000.

Branny also collaborated with other theatres (including the Gliwice Musical Theatre – They're Playing Our Song, and the Ludowy Theatre in Kraków – George & Ira Gershwin, directed by J. Szurmiej)..

=== Music ===
Branny performed across Poland with his own programme or as a soloist in major stage concerts.

From 1992, he collaborated with the Loch Camelot cabaret, recording several television programmes with the group (Alicja w Krainie Camelot, Nad naszym domem jasność, Pisanki Śpiewanki, Zdrowie pań dziewiczych i krępych, Uczta duchów). He was a key figure in the concert of Jewish songs titled Pieśń o Złotej Krainie (Song of the Golden Land).

He participated in numerous music and entertainment programmes recorded by Telewizja Polska S.A. (including Kabaret Olgi Lipińskiej, Spotkania z Balladą, Niech no tylko zakwitną jabłonie – TV Theatre, Piosenki Warsa, Co nam w duszy gra, Gale galicyjskie, Śmiech o wolności, Towarzystwo Pana Brzechwy, and Statek szalony, czyli płyniemy...).

Branny performed recitals such as Pteromania (TV recording, 1995), Że ty, że ja je t’aime (1997), and Nokturn Niekochanego (Bagatela Theatre, 1999). He also sang in concerts featuring Zygmunt Konieczny's film and theatre music, including Noc listopadowa, Serce moje gram (Stanisław Wyspiański), Norwid bezdomny – Bal (C.K. Norwid), and Litania Polska (Jan Twardowski).

He was a soloist in the oratorio Tu Es Petrus, composed by Piotr Rubik and Zbigniew Książek. He also performed in the third part of the Holy Cross Triptych (Tryptyk Świętokrzyski), titled Psałterz wrześniowy. In 1997, he recorded his first solo album, Że ty, że ja je t’aime. In 2007, he performed in the Leśniów Oratorio Siedem Pieśni Marii (Seven Songs of Mary) – composed by Zbigniew Książek and Bartłomiej Gliniak – as well as in the Kalwaria Oratorio (Oratorium Kalwaryjskie) by the same composers.

=== Film ===
In 1993, he played a leading role in the film Death Like a Slice of Bread (Śmierć jak kromka chleba), directed by Kazimierz Kutz.

=== Death ===
Branny died on 3 October 2026, at the age of 55.

== Awards ==
- 1993: Stage Song Review (Przegląd Piosenki Aktorskiej) in Wrocław – 2nd Prize and Audience Award
- 1994: Polish Song Festival in Opole – 1st Prize (shared with Katarzyna Jamróz) in the Cabaret Section
- 2005: "Jedynka" Festival in Sopot: "Jedynka" Summer Hit – 1st Prize (shared with Olga Szomańska and Piotr Rubik)
- 2007: TOPtrendy 2007 – 1st Prize (Audience Award), shared with the performers of oratorios by Piotr Rubik and Zbigniew Książek: Olga Radwan, Małgorzata Markiewicz, Joanna Słowińska, Janusz Radek, and Maciej Miecznikowski.

He received the City of Kraków Creative Scholarship in the field of performing arts.

== Decorations ==
- Bronze Cross of Merit (2009, "for achievements in artistic activity")
- Silver Cross of Merit (2019, "for services to Polish culture")
- Bronze Medal for Merit to Culture "Gloria Artis" (2024)
