= Marek Litewka =

Polish actor (1948–2024)

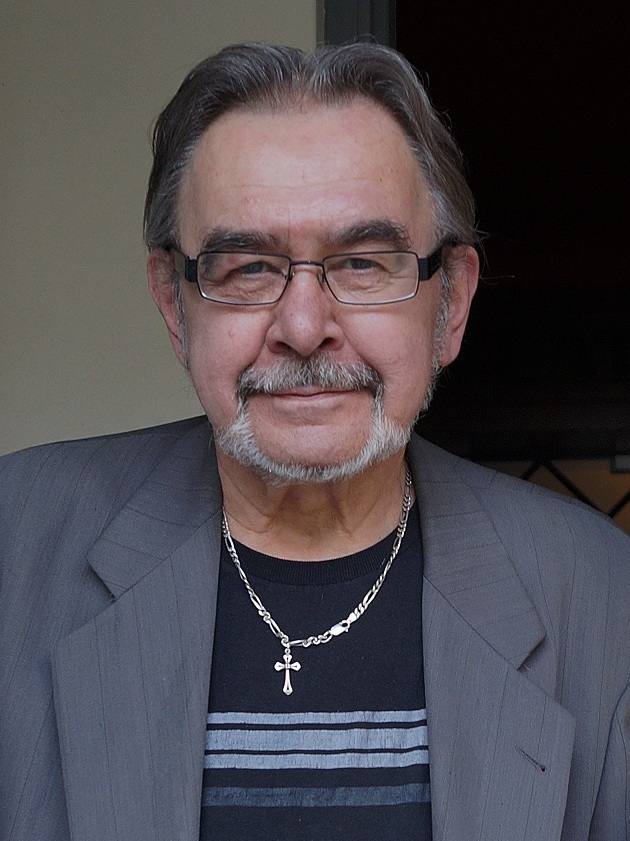
- Litewka in 2018
- Born: 6 August 1948; Kraków, Poland
- Died: 12 January 2024 (aged 75)
- Occupation: Actor

Marek Litewka (6 August 1948 – 12 January 2024) was a Polish actor.

== Biography ==
Litewka graduated from the Acting Department of the State Higher School of Theatre in Krakow in 1974. Initially, he performed at the Ludwik Solski Theatre in Tarnów (1974–1975), before moving to Kraków, where he performed at the Helena Modrzejewska Stary Theatre (1975–2003), the Bagatela Theatre (2003–2006) and the STU Theatre (2007–2016).

Litewka appeared in thirty-two Television Theatre productions (1973–2021) and three Polish Radio Theatre programmes (1973–1989).

His most notable films include Camera Buff (1979) and The Constant Factor (1980).

Litewka died on 12 January 2024, at the age of 75.
