= Magdalena Walach =

Polish actress (born 1976)

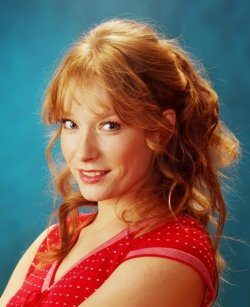
- Born: Magdalena Walach; 13 May 1976 (age 49); Racibórz, Poland
- Occupation: Actress
- Years active: 1999–present
- Spouse: Paweł Okraska

Magdalena Walach (born 13 May 1976) is a Polish film and theater actress. In 1999 she completed studies at the Ludwik Solski Academy for the Dramatic Arts in Kraków. She is a member of the Bagatela Theatre acting company. Walach is married to actor Paweł Okraska, with whom she had their son Piotr (2006).

== Career ==
Magdalena Walach is a graduate of Ludwik Solski Academy for the Dramatic Arts (1999). A role in a musical adaptation of The Secret Garden, directed by Janusz Szydłowski, was the start of her involvement in the Bagatela Theatre. Since that premiere, she has played roles in performances of "Balladyny", "Kosmosu", "Stosunków na szczycie", "Trzech sióstr" and "Rewizora". She has also appeared on the stages of other Kraków and Warsaw theaters, and also performed in several Television Theatre stagings.

Walach competed in the seventh season of Taniec z gwiazdami (Dancing with the Stars), winning first place with dancer Cezary Olszewski. She received a perfect score from judges on 8 occasions.

== Filmography ==
Title	Year	Role	Notes
The Eastern Gate	2025	Maria Niedzwiecka	2 episodes
Listy do M. Pozegnania i powroty	2024	Ewa	Main cast
Bokser (Boxer)	2024	Mother of Jedrzej	Main cast
Polowanie	2023	Anna Król	Main cast
Na Bank Sie Uda	2019	Sabina Czernecka	Main cast
Po Prostu Przyjazn		Magda	Main cast
Zyc Nie Umierac (Life Must Go On)	2015	Malgoska	Main cast
Ziarno Prawdy	2015	Barbara Sobieraj	Main cast
Mój Biegun (My Own Pole)	2013	Ula (Jasia's mother)	main cast
Komisarz Alex (Commissioner Alex)	2011–present	Lucyna Szmidt	main cast
Instynkt (Instinct)	2011	Magda Janik (murderer)	guest appearance
Usta Usta (Mouth to Mouth)	2011	Alex Najman	guest appearance
M jak Miłość (L for Love)	2010–present	Agnieszka Olszewska (prosecutor)	main cast
Dance 4 U	2010	Iza	main cast
Ojciec Mateusz	2009	Monika	guest appearance
Enen	2009	Renata	main cast
Tancerze (Dancers)	2009–2010	Alicja Pawłowicz (dance teacher)	main cast
Jak żyć?	2008	birthing class instructor	episode
Kryminalni (Crime Detectives)	2008	Ewelina Tulewicz	guest appearance
Twarzą w twarz (Face to Face)	2007–2008	Marta Michalska/Marta Waszak	main cast
Officer	2005	Iwona (Darek's wife)	guest appearance
Pensjonat pod Różą	2004–2006	Iwa Mroczkiewicz	main cast
Marcinelle	2003	Giselle	
Miodowe lata	2003	Samanta	guest appearance
The Supplement	2002	friend	episode
Life as a Fatal Sexually Transmitted Disease	2000	waitress	episode

== Television theatre ==
Title	Year	Role	Notes
Teorban	2008	Joanna	
Sesja kastingowa	2002		
Klub kawalerów	2000	Marynia Mirska	
Teatr niekonsekwencji	1997		

== Polish dubbing ==
Title	Year	Role	Notes
Wyprawa na Księżyc 3D	2008	Nat's mother	
Niania (Nanny McPhee)	2005	Evangeline	
