= Elisabeth Duda =

Polish actress and writer

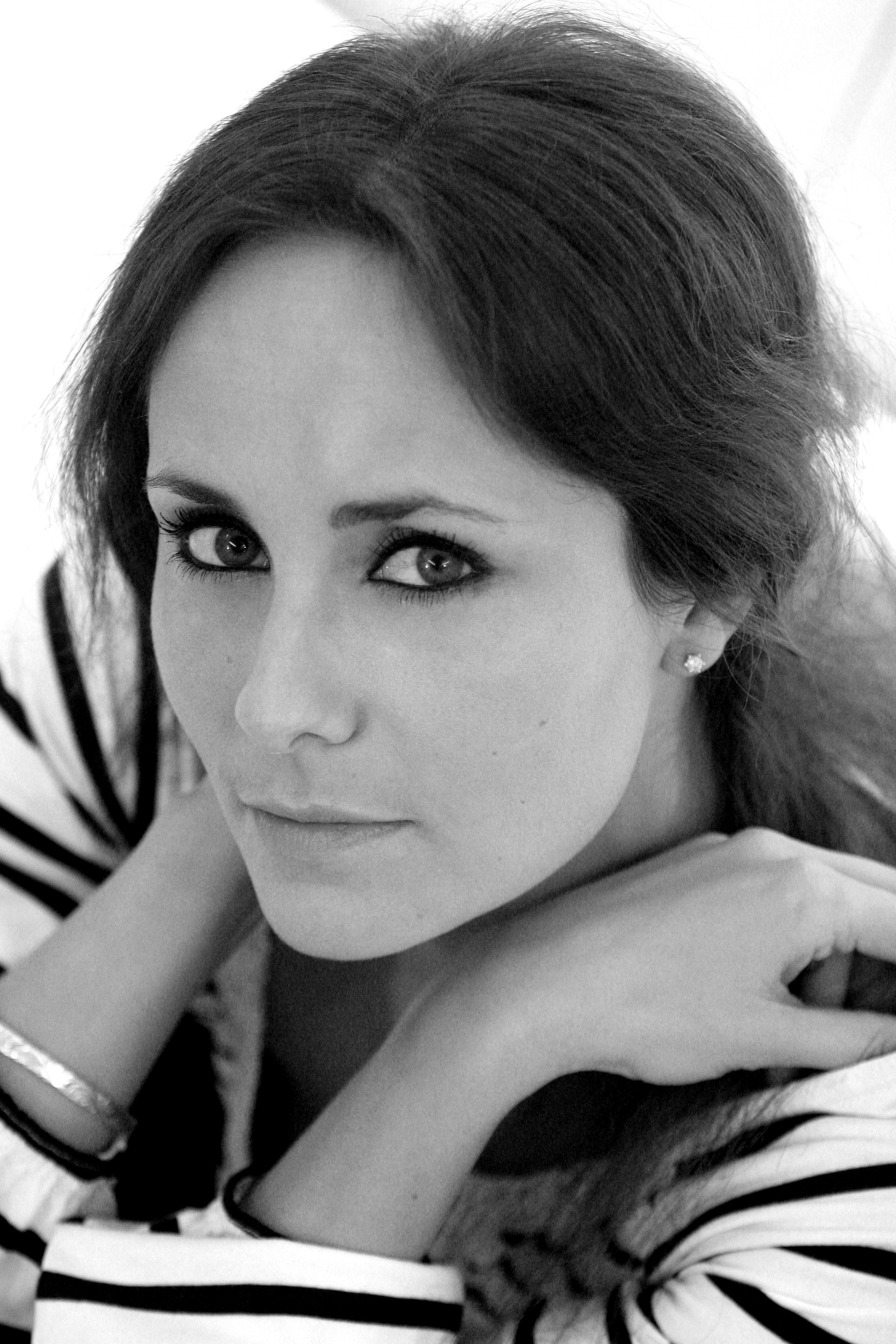
- Elisabeth Duda
- Born: Elisabeth Duda; 1979; France

Elisabeth Duda (born 1979) is a Polish film and television actress and writer.

== Early life ==
Duda was born in France. Her father is from France and her mother is Polish.

== Filmography ==
- 2002: Dwie kawy
- 2003 – 2008 : Europa da się lubić
- 2006: Bezład
- 2008: Taniec z gwiazdami
- 2008: Niania as Jacqueline
- 2008: Agentki as Celine
- 2008: Projekt plaża
- 2009: Goście, goście w TVN Warszawa
- 2011: Celles qui aimaient Richard Wagner as Cosima Wagner
- 2011: Śladami Marii Skłodowskiej-Curie as Maria Skłodowska-Curie
- 2013: Run Boy Run
- 2017: Coexister
- 2018: Dilili in Paris

== Book ==
- Żożo i Lulu (2010)
- Mój Paryż (2010)
- Europa w kuchni (2007)
- W 60 minut dookoła Polski (2006)
