= Tomasz Schimscheiner =

Polish actor (born 1967)

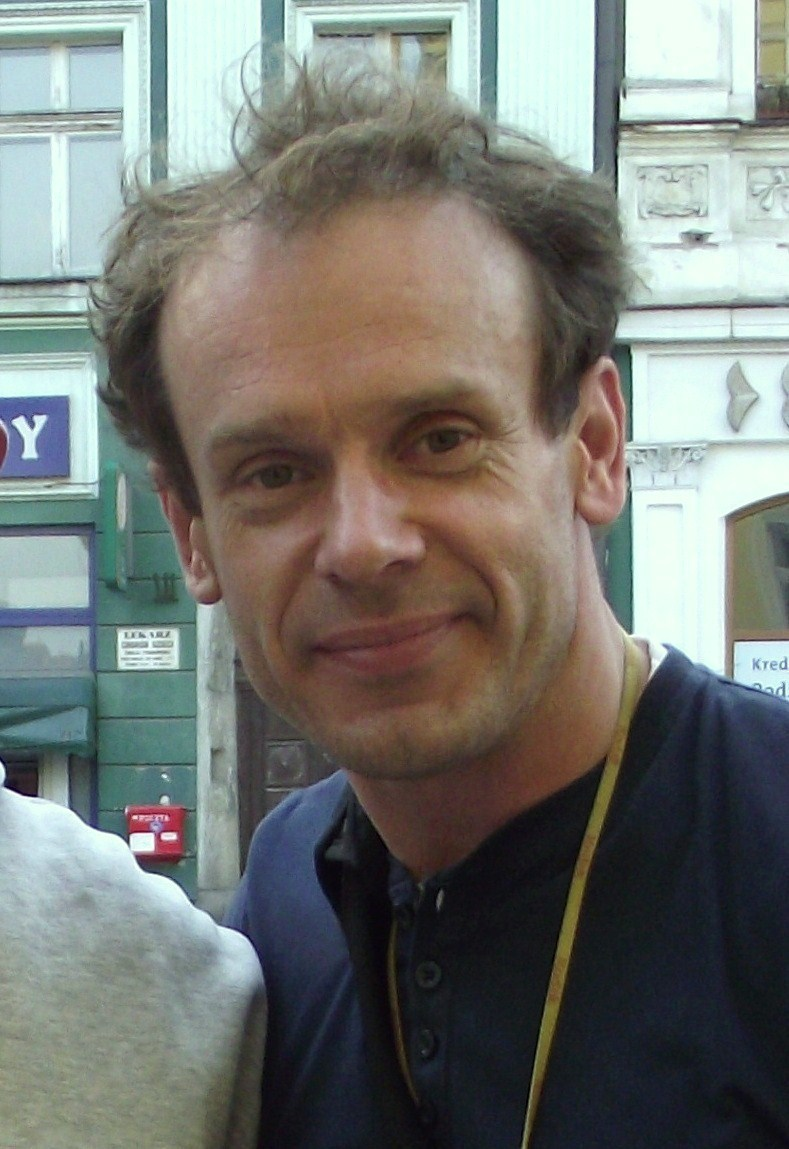
- Born: 26 February 1967 (age 59); Kraków, Poland
- Occupation: Actor

Tomasz Schimscheiner (born 26 February 1967) is a Polish actor. He plays at the Ludowy Theatre in Kraków. He is the father of actress Lena Schimscheiner.

== Filmography ==
- Zawrócony (1994) as opposition activist handing out leaflets
- Śmierć jak kromka chleba (1994) as miner
- Legenda Tatr (1994) as Franek Walczaków
- Pułkownik Kwiatkowski (1995) as "Sergeant" Kowicki, a member of Colonel Kwiatkowski's security detail
- Sława i chwała (1997) as Kostia, soldier in the train (episode 2)
- Duże zwierzę (2000) as foreman
- Anioł w Krakowie (2002) 2 roles: the angel Lubega, Elvis Presley in Purgatory; also Assistant Director
- Na Wspólnej (2003–2026; TV series) as Andrzej Brzozowski
- Zakochany anioł (2005) as angel Lubega
- Bezmiar sprawiedliwości (2006) as Andrzej, subsidiary prosecutor
- Proste rzeczy (2021) as Błażej's uncle
- Aniela (2025; TV series) as Mariusz (episode 5)
- Czarna śmierć (2025; TV series) as Zbigniew Majza (episodes 5–7)

Source.
