= Tamara Arciuch =

Polish actress (born 1975)

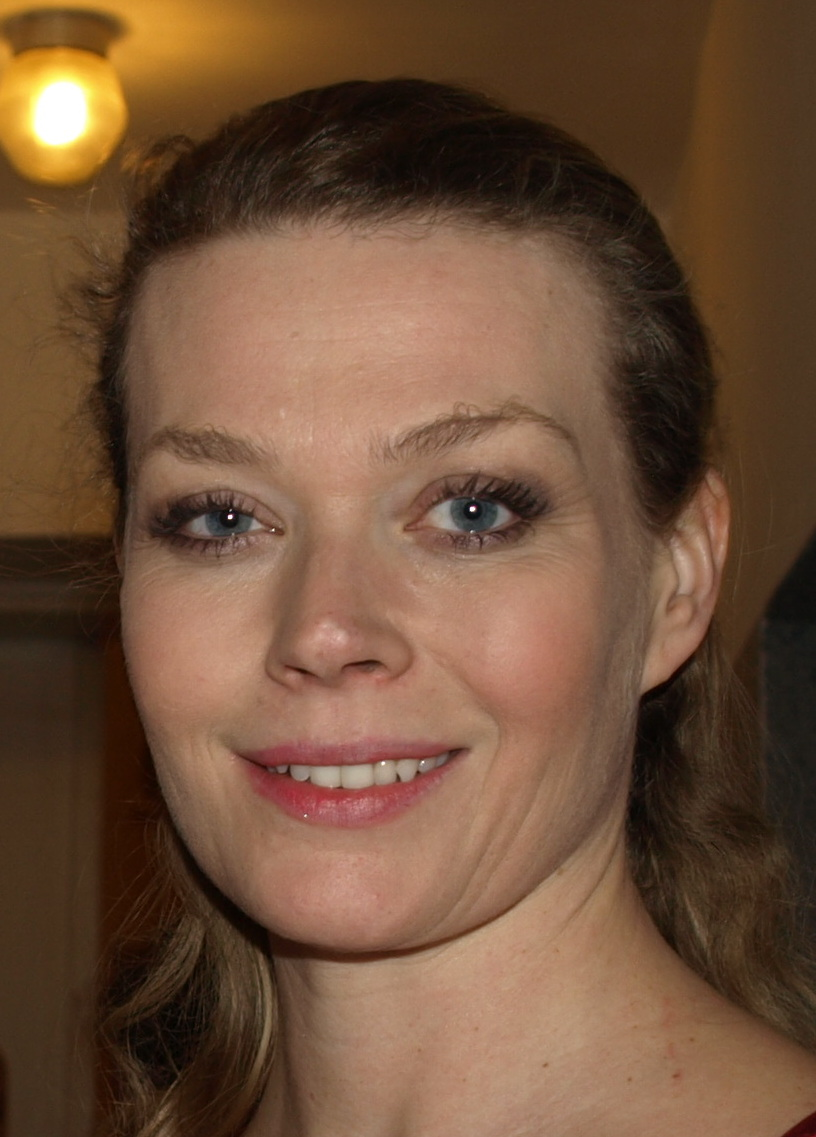
- Arciuch in 2013
- Born: 24 March 1975 (age 51); Skierniewice, Poland
- Occupation: actress
- Years active: 1997-present
- Spouse: Bernard Szyc (1997-2011; divorced)
- Partner: Bartłomiej Kasprzykowski (since 2009)

Tamara Arciuch (born 24 March 1975 in Skierniewice) is a Polish actress.

== Life and career ==
Arciuch was born in Skierniewice. In 1997 she graduated from the AST National Academy of Theatre Arts in Kraków and began performing on stage. In 1998 she made her film debut and in 2000 she co-starred in British miniseries Anna Karenina. Her later career was on polish soap operas, before her female leading role in the 2004 film The Wedding directed by Wojciech Smarzowski. From 2005 to 2009 she starred in the sitcom Niania. In 2007 she appeared on the Polish version of TV programme Dancing with the Stars.

From 2010 to 2018, Arciuch starred on the soap opera, L for Love and from 2010 to 2020 played a recurring role on the detective drama series, Father Matthew.

== Personal life ==
She was married to Bernard Szyc. Together they have a son named Krzysztof. She has a son Michał (b. 2009) with her partner Bartłomiej Kasprzykowski.

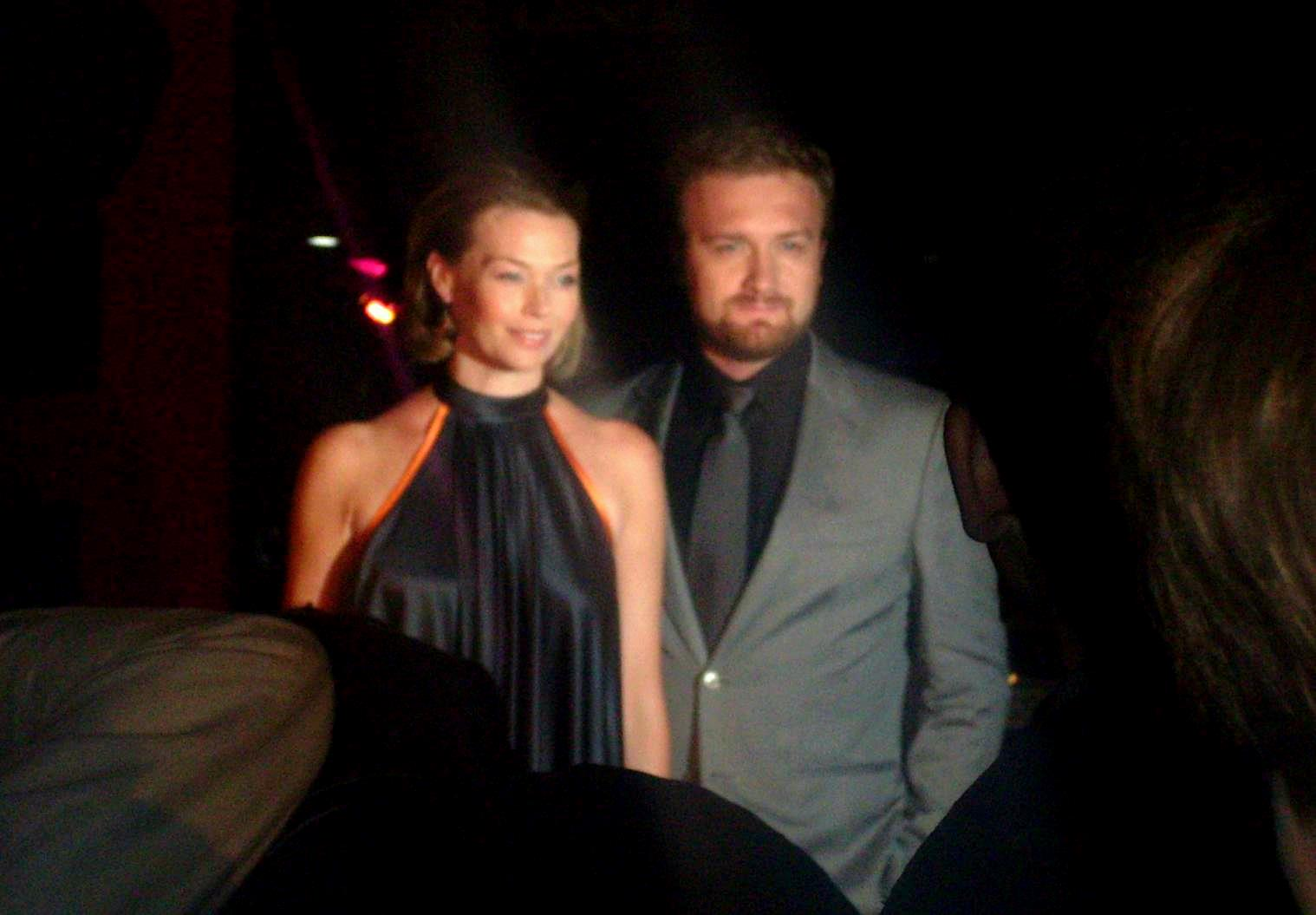
Arciuch and Bartłomiej Kasprzykowski at the Polish Film Festival in Gdynia in 2009

== Filmography ==
- 2011: Och, Karol – Agata
- 2010: Lincz – Attorney Łubieńska
- 2010: M jak Miłość (L for Love) – Anna Gruszyńska
- 2010: Ojciec Mateusz (Father Matthew) – Mayor of Sandomierz Justyna Malec
- 2010: Operacja Reszka – Jasnowłosa
- 2009: Złoty środek – Wiktoria
- 2008: Mniejsze zło – Doctor
- 2008: Trzeci oficer – Stella
- 2008: Nie kłam, kochanie
- 2007: Halo Hans! (inspired by 'Allo 'Allo!) – Beautiful Girl
- 2006: Oficerowie – Stella
- 2005: Niania (Polish version of The Nanny) – Karolina Łapińska
- 2005–2007: Egzamin z życia – Prostitute
- 2004–2008: Pierwsza miłość – Mrs. Iwonka
- 2004: Długi weekend – Felusi's Mother
- 2004–2007: Kryminalni (Crime Detectives) – An actress (2004), Wanda Umańska (2007)
- 2004–2005: Oficer – Stella Lewandowska
- 2004: Camera Café – Wife
- 2004: The Wedding – Kasia
- 2002–2003: Psie serce – Renata
- 2002–2003: Kasia and Tomek – Dentist
- 2000–2001: Adam and Ewa – Monika Rozdrażewska
- 2000: Anna Karenina – Princess Sorokina
- 2000: Sukces – Anetka Grudzińska
- 2000: Piotrek zgubił dziadka oko, a Jasiek chce dożyć spokojnej starości – Danka Dryblas
- 2002–2003: Lokatorzy – Anna Moc-Cieszkowska (2002), Diana (2003)
- 1999: Tygrysy Europy – Ania
- 1999: Na dobre i na złe – Viola
- 1997: Młode wilki 1/2 – Agata (Anna's friend)
