= Yurek Bogayevicz =

Polish film director

- Born: Jerzy Bogajewicz; 2 June 1949 (age 77); Poznań, Poland
- Occupations: Film director, screenwriter, film producer

Yurek Bogajevicz (born Jerzy Bogajewicz in Poznań, 2 June 1949) is a Polish film director, screenwriter, actor and producer. He directed, among others, Anna (1987), Three of Hearts (1993) and Exit in Red (1996).

== Filmography ==
Film

| Year | Title | Director | Writer | Producer |
|---|---|---|---|---|
| 1987 | Anna | Yes | Yes | Yes |
| 1993 | Three of Hearts | Yes | No | No |
| 1996 | Exit in red | Yes | No | No |
| 2001 | Edges of the Lord | Yes | Yes | No |

Television

- Kasia i Tomek (2002–2003)
- Caméra Café (2004)
- Niania (2005–2006)
- Stacja (2010)

Acting roles

- Pies – as Jerzy Mazurek (1973)
- Pozwólcie nam do woli fruwać nad ogrodem – as Staszek (1974)
- Polskie drogi (1976)
- Pora na czarownice – as Passer-by on the station (1993)
- Kasia i Tomek – as Psychologist (2002-2003)
