= Łaźnia Nowa Theatre =

Theatre in Poland

Coordinates: 50°04′41″N 20°02′53″E

- Teatr Łaźnia Nowa
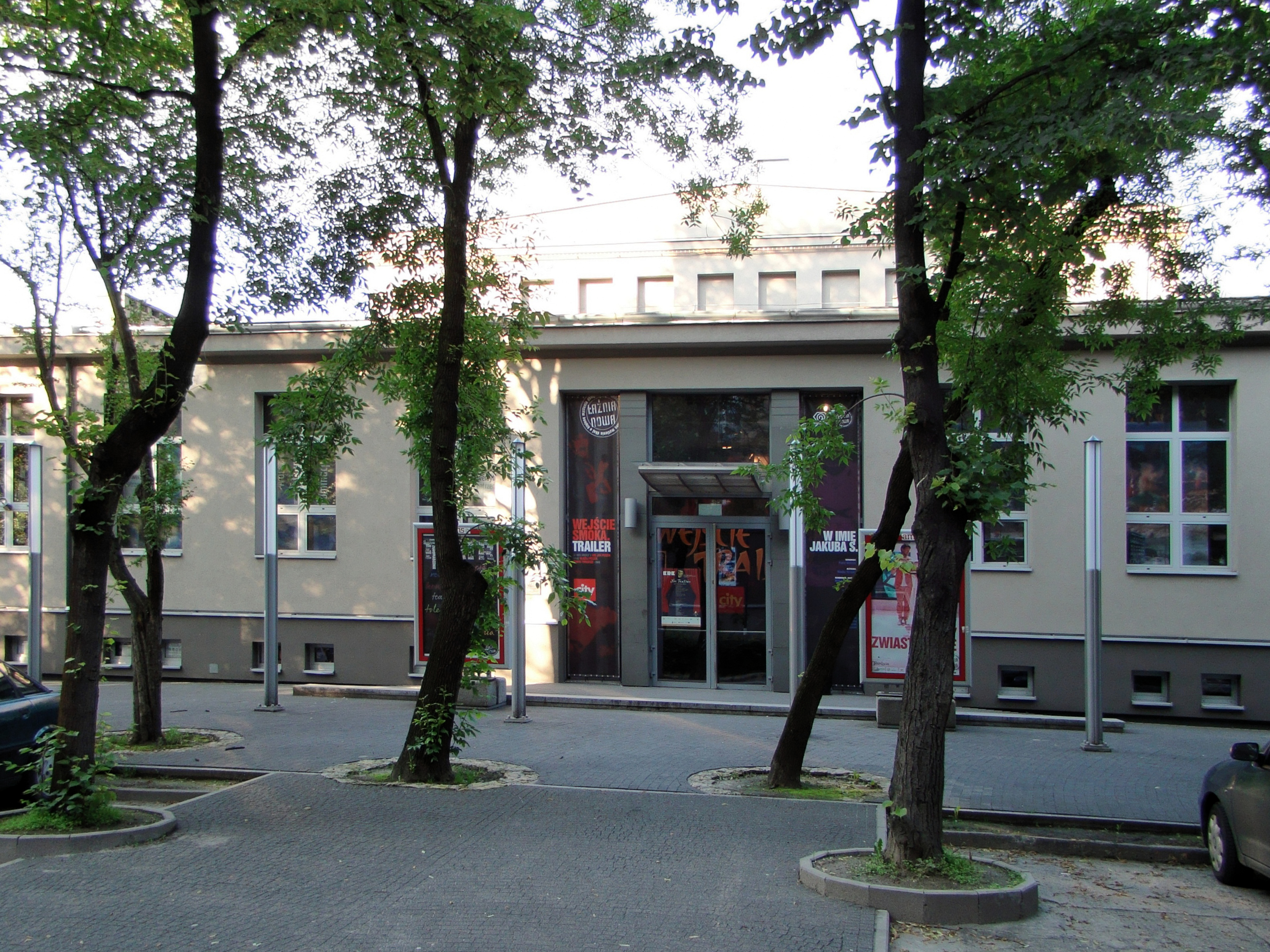
- Entrance to the building of Łaźnia Nowa Theatre
- Interactive map of Łaźnia Nowa Theatre
- Address: os. Szkolne 25; Kraków; Poland
- Type: Theatre

Construction
- Opened: 2005; 21 years ago
- Years active: 2005-present

Website
- www.laznianowa.pl

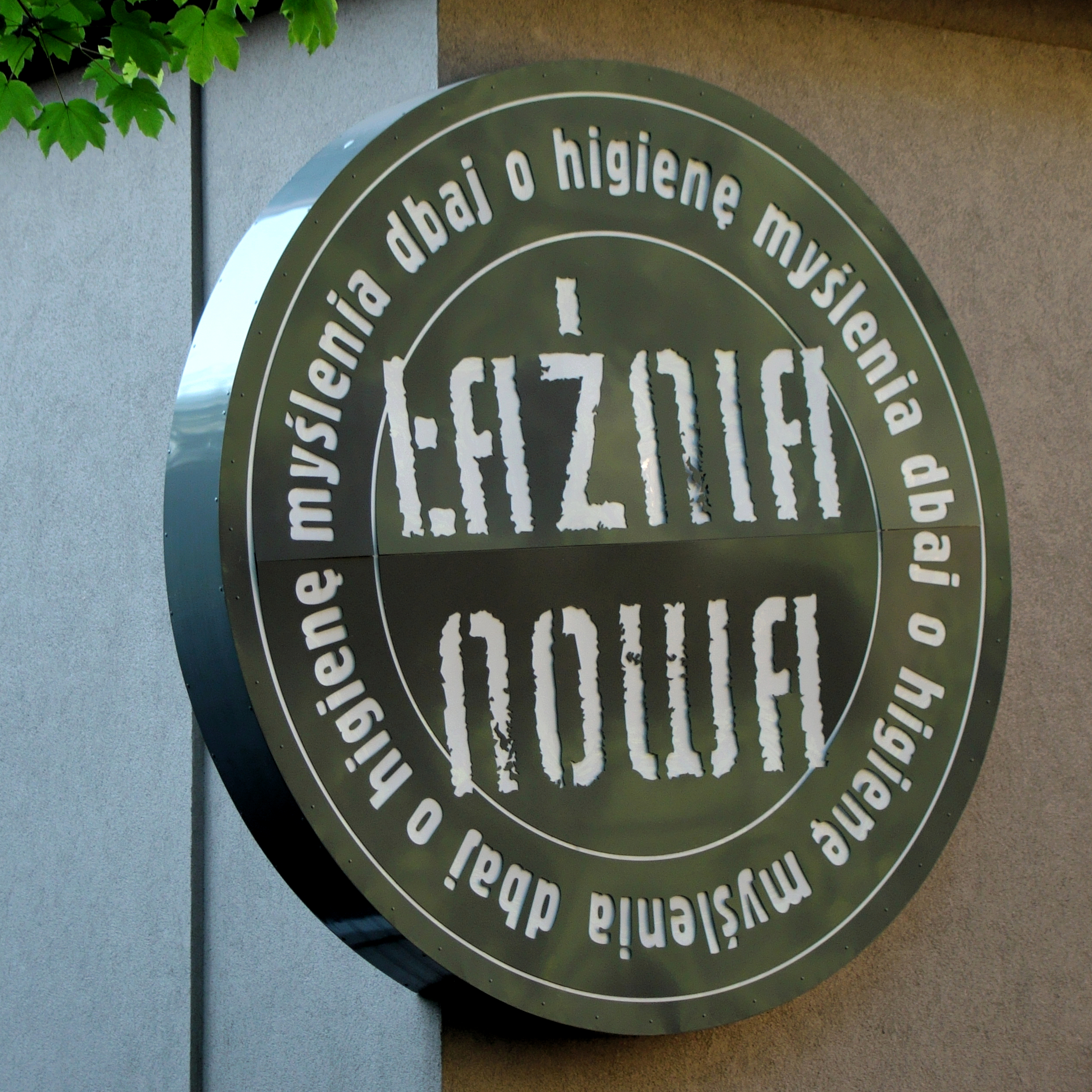
Signboard of the theatre

Łaźnia Nowa Theatre is the newest dramatic theatre in Kraków, Poland, founded in 2005. It is located in the district of Nowa Huta which was built from the ground up during the 1950s' Communist policy of Socialist realism. Appropriately, the theatre is residing in the post-industrial halls of a former technical school.

Łaźnia Nowa Theatre was preceded by Łaźnia Theatre, located in Kazimierz (former Jewish district of Kraków). The theatre was originally located in a cellar which used to serve as a Jewish mikvah, hence the name łaźnia (public bath in Polish). After the theatre was moved to the district of Nowa Huta (literally New Steelworks), the word Nowa (New) was added to its name.

== Artistic philosophy ==
The creators of the theatre assert that all art conveys a positive message, resulting from the very act of creation. In their productions they spread the same message about their district. The theatre is surrounded by blocks of flats, green spaces, churches and supermarkets. Its objective is to reflect that neighborhood including people who live and work there.

District of Nowa Huta, built as a satellite industrial town by the communist government, always used to evoke strong emotions. Planned as a huge centre of heavy industry, Nowa Huta was to become also an ideal town for the communist propaganda. It was the litmus paper of political and social climate in Poland. The inhabitants of Nowa Huta were strongly affected by its history up to the end of communism. Once one of Pope John Paul II's favorite places and the heart of the Solidarity resistance movement, Nowa Huta witnessed the downfall of its industrial prominence and became stereotyped by mass media in a negative fashion. Łaźnia Nowa Theatre aims to challenge such stereotypes.

== Recent shows ==
- Cukier w normie, premiered in April 2005
- Mieszkam tu, May 2005
- Oedipus – drama from Nowa Huta, November 2005
- From Poland with love, March 2006
