= Bagatela Theatre =

Theatre in Krakow, Poland

Tadeusz Boy-Żeleński "Bagatela" Theatre
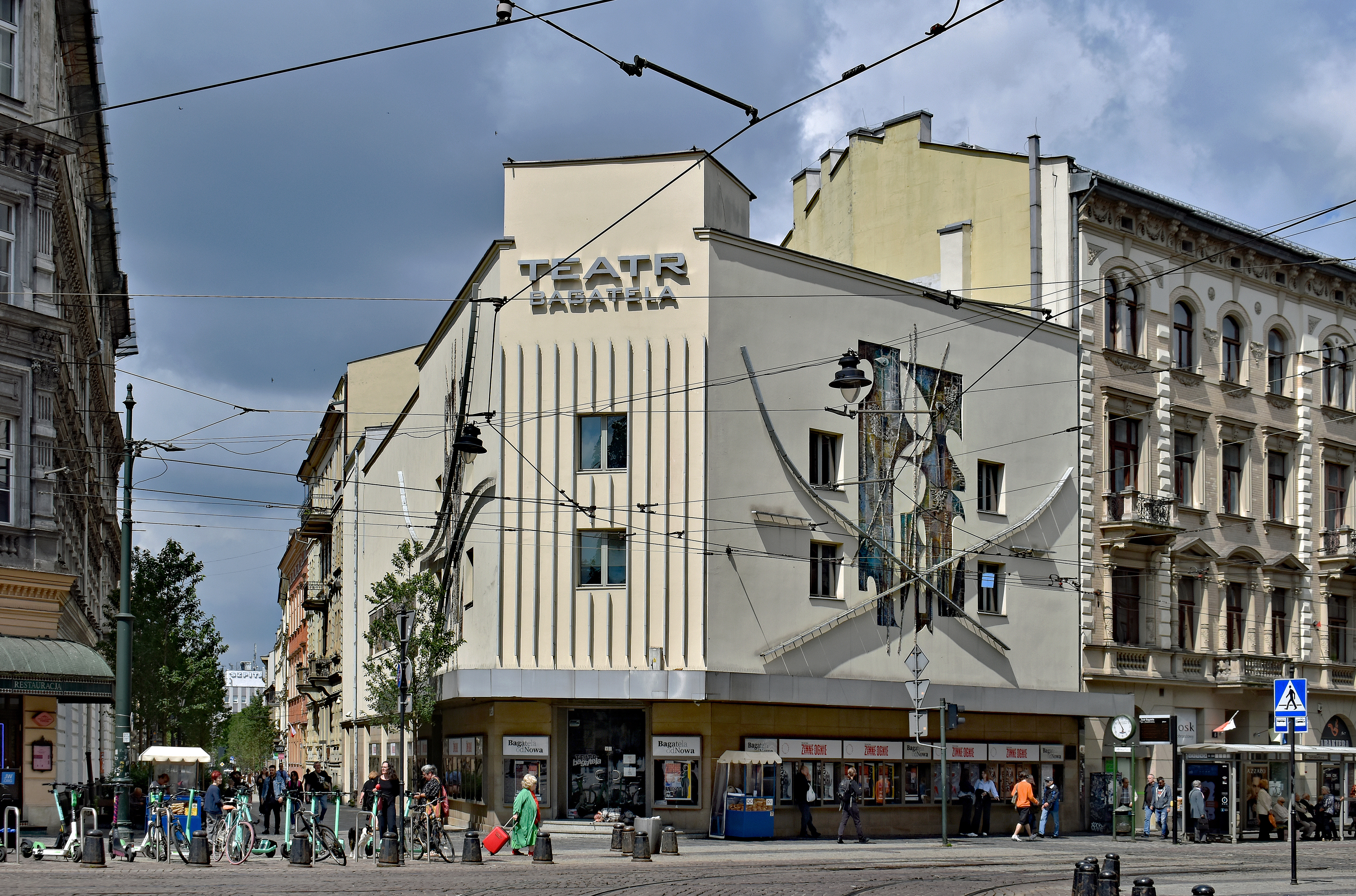
- Bagatela Theatre
- Interactive map of Tadeusz Boy-Żeleński "Bagatela" Theatre
- Address: 6 Karmelicka Street; Kraków; Poland
- Coordinates: 50°03′49″N 19°55′56.5″E

Construction
- Opened: 1918

Website
- https://bagatela.pl/

Historic Monument of Poland
- Designated: 1994-09-08
- Part of: Kraków historical city complex
- Reference no.: M.P. 1994 nr 50 poz. 418

The Bagatela (Polish: Teatr "Bagatela" im. Tadeusza Boya-Żeleńskiego), theatre in Kraków is situated at the junction of Karmelicka Street and Krupnicza Street. The theatre's intimate "new stage" is located on 7 Józefa Sarego Street.

== History ==
The theatre's history dates back to 1918, when Marian Dąbrowski, publisher and editor of Kraków's "Ilustrowany Kurier Codzienny" (English: Illustrated Daily Courier, commonly known as IKC, also Ikac) initiated the creation of the stage. The building was designed by architect Janusz Zarzecki during 1918 - 1919, and its interior was designed by painter and decorator Henry Uziembło. In 1926, due to financial difficulties and increase in the popularity of the cinema, the theatre was reclassified as a cinema. A fire that broke out the night of 6/7 April 1928 completely destroyed the interior. In 1938, the building was modernized and renamed "Scala". It became the most elegant cinema in Kraków. Housed here during 1946 - 1948 was an intimate theatre. Since 1949 it has been home to the Państwowy Teatr Młodego Widza (English: State Theatre of the Young Viewer). The Rozmaitości Theatre was established here in 1957. The theatre returned to being called Bagatela in 1970, and was dedicated to the memory of Tadeusz Boy-Żeleński in 1972. The writer and doctor lived in a flat in the area for many years.

Roman Polanski made his debut here as a young man. The theatre was originally designed for children but nowadays shows musicals, comedies and other light entertainments suitable for families.

== Actors ==
- Krzysztof Bochenek
- Jakub Bohosiewicz
- Przemysław Branny
- Urszula Grabowska
- Aleksandra Godlewska
- Agnieszka Grochowicz
- Marcin Kobierski
- Alina Kamińska
- Alicja Kobielska
- Grzegorz Kliś
- Tomasz Kot
- Anna Krakowiak
- Wojciech Leonowicz
- Marek Litewka
- Katarzyna Litwin
- Ewa Mitoń
- Tomasz Obara
- Małgorzata Piskorz
- Piotr Różanski
- Sławomir Sośnierz
- Dariusz Starczewski
- Ewelina Starejki
- Przemysław Tejkowski
- Dariusz Toczek
- Magdalena Walach
- Juliusz Krzysztof Warunek
- Witold Surówka
- Krystyna Stankiewicz
