= Jak oni śpiewają season 4 =

Jak oni śpiewają
- Season 4
- Hosted by: Katarzyna Cichopek; Krzysztof Ibisz
- Judges: Edyta Górniak; Rudi Schuberth; Elżbieta Zapendowska
- Winner: Artur Chamski
- Runner-up: Karolina Nowakowska

Release
- Original network: Polsat
- Original release: September 6 – December 6, 2008

Season chronology
- ← Previous; Season 3 Next → Season 5

The 4th season of Jak oni śpiewają, the Polish edition of Soapstar Superstar, started on September 6, 2008 and ended on December 6, 2008. It was broadcast by Polsat. Joanna Liszowska and Krzysztof Ibisz as the hosts, and the judges were: Edyta Górniak, Elżbieta Zapendowska and Rudi Schuberth.

== Stars ==
Celebrity	Character	Soap	Status
Alżbeta Leńska	Edyta Jeżowska	"Pierwsza miłość" Polsat	Eliminated 1st on September 13, 2008
Jacek Kawalec	Tomasz Witebski	"Ranczo" TVP1	Eliminated 2nd on September 20, 2008
Jolanta Fraszyńska	Monika Zybert	"Na dobre i na złe" TVP2	Withdrew on September 27, 2008
Jerzy Zelnik	Waldemar Jasnyk	Teraz albo nigdy! TVN	Eliminated 4th on October 4, 2008
Katarzyna Galica	Hilda Klopss	"Halo, Hans" Polsat	Eliminated 5th on October 11, 2008
Jacek Poniedziałek	Rafał Lubomski	"M jak miłość" TVP2	Eliminated 6th on October 18, 2008
Monika Mrozowska	Majka Kwiatkowska	"Rodzina zastępcza" Polsat	Eliminated 7th on October 25, 2008
Łukasz Dziemidok	Patryk Skalski	"Pierwsza miłość" Polsat	Eliminated 8th on November 8, 2008
Żora Koroliow	Anatolij Romanow	"Egzamin z życia" TVP2	Eliminated 9th on November 15, 2008
Elżbieta Romanowska	Jola	"Ranczo" TVP1	Eliminated 10th on November 22, 2008
Anna Mucha	Madzia Marszałek	"M jak miłość" TVP2	Eliminated 11th on November 29, 2008
Tomasz Stockinger	Paweł Lubicz	"Klan" TVP1	Eliminated 12th on December 6, 2008
Aleksandra Szwed	Eliza Kwiatowska	"Rodzina zastępcza" Polsat	Third Place on December 6, 2008
Karolina Nowakowska	Olga Ziober	"M jak miłość" TVP2	Second Place on December 6, 2008
Artur Chamski	Kamil Stefański	"Fala zbrodni" Polsat	Winners on December 6, 2008

== Guest Performances ==
Episode	Date	Artist(s)	Song(s)
3	September 20, 2008	Blue Café	"Czas nie będzie czekał"
6	October 11, 2008	Stachursky	"Jedwab"
10	November 15, 2008	Feel & Iwona Węgrowska	"Pokonaj siebie"
10	November 15, 2008	Feel & Iwona Węgrowska	"Jak anioła głos"
11	November 22, 2008	Kombi	"Awinion"
12	November 29, 2008	The Fantastic Four	"My Girl"
12	November 29, 2008	The Fantastic Four	"Can't Take My Eyes Off You"
12	November 29, 2008	Maryla Rodowicz	"Ech, mała"

== Scores ==
Couple	Place	1	2	3	4	5	6	7	8	9	10	11	12	13
Artur Chamski	1	4.8	5.5	5.5	5.4	5.9	6.0	4.3	6.0	6.0	6.0	4.6+5.9=10.5	5.8+5.9=11.7	6.0+5.5+6.0=17.5
Karolina Nowakowska	2	4.5	5.0	5.5	6.0	5.3	6.0	5.0	5.9	5.3	6.0	4.8+5.3=10.1	5.9+6.0=11.9	5.3+6.0+6.0=17.3
Aleksandra Szwed	3	5.3	5.5	6.0	5.8	5.5	4.5	4.6	5.3	5.5	4.9	5.9+4.8=10.7	6.0+6.0=12.0	5.3+5.3=10.6
Tomasz Stockinger	4	4.3	4.4	4.3	5.0	5.3	4.5	6.0	5.4	6.0	5.5	4.5+4.0=8.5	6.0+6.0=12.0	5.7
Anna Mucha	5	1.9	4.5	5.0	4.3	5.5	5.5	6.0	4.5	5.3	4.9	3.0+5.5=8.5		
Elżbieta Romanowska	6	3.0	3.5	5.3	5.8	5.8	6.0	4.8	4.0	5.5	5.3			
Żora Koroliow	7	3.4	3.1	4.6	4.5	3.3	3.4	3.3	4.9	5.8				
Łukasz Dziemidok	8	2.0	3.5	3.3		4.0	4.4	5.3	4.5					
Monika Mrozowska	9	4.8	3.8	5.0	4.1	5.4	5.0	5.5						
Jacek Poniedziałek	10					4.3	3.3							
Katarzyna Galica	11	3.3	4.3	3.4	4.3	3.3								
Jerzy Zelnik	12	5.3	5.0	5.8	5.9									
Jolanta Fraszyńska	13	3.6	4.8	5.8										
Jacek Kawalec	14	4.0	5.1											
Alżbeta Leńska	15	3.3												

Red numbers indicate the lowest score for each week.
Green numbers indicate the highest score for each week.
indicates the star eliminated that week.
indicates the returning stars that finished in the bottom two.
indicates the star who has got immunitet
indicates the star withdrew.

=== The Best Score (6.0) ===
No	Star	Song	Episode	6.0
1	Elżbieta Romanowska	Sparkling diamonds	6	1
2	Tomasz Stockinger	Nie wierz nigdy kobiecie	7	4
2	Tomasz Stockinger	Everybody needs somebody	9	4
2	Tomasz Stockinger	Acapulco	12	4
2	Tomasz Stockinger	Just a gigolo	12	4
3	Aleksandra Szwed	Trzynastego	3	3
3	Aleksandra Szwed	Baila	12	3
3	Aleksandra Szwed	Zanim zrozumiesz	12	3
5	Anna Mucha	Cherry cherry lady	7	1
9	Artur Chamski	Love is all around	6	6
9	Artur Chamski	Na zawsze i na wieczność	8	6
9	Artur Chamski	Nie ma miłości bez zazdrości	9	6
9	Artur Chamski	A gdy jest już ciemno	10	6
9	Artur Chamski	Last Christmas	13	6
9	Artur Chamski	Hello	13	6
13	Karolina Nowakowska	Mercy	4	6
13	Karolina Nowakowska	Singing in the rain	6	6
13	Karolina Nowakowska	Och, życie, kocham cię nad życie	10	6
13	Karolina Nowakowska	Ostatni	12	6
13	Karolina Nowakowska	Waterloo	13	6
13	Karolina Nowakowska	Woman in love	13	6

== Song Chart ==
Star	Week 1	Week 2	Week 3	Week 4	Week 5	Week 6	Week 7	Week 8	Week 9	Week 10	Week 11		Week 12		Week 13 Final		
Artur Chamski	Na jednej z dzikich plaż	Nothing's gonna change my love for you	Help!	You're beautiful	Ai no corrida	Love is all around	Nasz Disneyland	Na zawsze i na wieczność	Nie ma miłości bez zazdrości	A gdy jest już ciemno	Wolność i swoboda	Ślad	Senza una donna	Imię deszczu	Last Christmas	Voulez-Vous	Hello
Karolina Nowakowska	Iść w stronę słońca	Touch Me	Wszystko mi mówi, że mnie ktoś pokochał	Mercy	I will survive	Singing in the rain	Płynie w nas gorąca krew	Don't stop the music	Nie kłam, że kochasz mnie	Och, życie, kocham cię nad życie	Jesteś szalona	Nasze rendez-vous	Sara perche ti amo	Ostatni	All I want for Christmas is you	Waterloo	Woman in love
Aleksandra Szwed	Gdy nie ma dzieci	It's raining man	Trzynastego	Say it right	Jak minął dzień?	Over the rainbow	Thriller	Biała armia	Hit the road, Jack	Black and White	Bierz co chcesz	Słodkiego, miłego życia	Baila	Zanim zrozumiesz	White Christmas	Dancing queen	
Tomasz Stockinger	Dziewczyny lubią brąz	Dolce vita	Love me tender	Dawna dziewczyno	Copacabana	Killer	Nie wierz nigdy kobiecie	Miasto budzi się	Everybody needs somebody	Wypijmy za błędy	Majteczki w kropeczki	Pokolenie	Acapulco	Just a gigolo	Dzień jeden w roku		
Anna Mucha	Boys, boys, boys	Words	Satisfaction	Lasciate mi cantare	Kiedy byłem małym chłopcem	Gdybym był bogaty	Cherry cherry lady	Yellow lemon tree	Czy te oczy mogą kłamać	Ev'ry night	Bo wszyscy Polacy to jedna rodzina	Królowie życia	Oczy czarne				
Elżbieta Romanowska	Let's get loud!	Kolorowe sny	Nie bądź taki szybki, Bill	Jesteś lekiem na całe zło	Jadą wozy kolorowe	Sparkling diamonds	Kocham cię, kochanie moje	Push the button	Baw mnie	Tyle słońca w całym mieście							
Żora Korolyow	Tic tic tac	La camisa negra	La bamba	Zatańczysz ze mną jeszcze raz	Bo z dziewczynami	I'm a believer	Karma chameleon	Niekochanie	Summer nights	Najwięcej witaminy mają polskie dziewczyny							
Łukasz Dziemidok	W dzień gorącego lata	Life is life	Light my fire		No woman, no cry	Do it for you	Skóra	Jedwab	Malczik								
Monika Mrozowska	Monika, dziewczyna ratownika	Życie cudem jest	Przyjdzie na to czas	Ella elle l'a	YMCA	Take my breath away	Like a virgin										
Jacek Poniedziałek					Imagine	Uciekaj moje serce											
Katarzyna Galica	Pocałuj noc	Hej szalała, szalała	Sugar sugar	Listen to your heart	Mamma mia												
Jerzy Zelnik	Don’t worry, be happy	The sound of San Francisco	Yesterday	Intymnie													
Jolanta Fraszyńska	Motylem jestem	Jak się masz, kochanie?	Autostop														
Jacek Kawalec	Baśka	Mój jest ten kawałek podłogi															
Alżbieta Leńska	Uh la la la																

Not scored
Highest scoring dance
Lowest scoring dance
