= Jak oni śpiewają =

- Presented by: Krzysztof Ibisz, Katarzyna Cichopek, Joanna Liszowska, Michalina Sosna, Mariusz Czerkawski
- Country of origin: Poland
- No. of seasons: 7

Production
- Running time: 150 minutes (finals – about 180 min.)

Original release
- Network: Polsat
- Release: 2007 – 2009
- Network: TVP2
- Release: 2020

Jak oni śpiewają (How They Sing) is a Polish TV show based on a British talent show Soapstar Superstar.

== Presenters ==
Years	Series	Presenter
2007–2009	1–6; How They Celebrate (Christmas Special); How The Sing – Child's Day (Special)	Krzysztof Ibisz
2007–2009	1–4; How They Celebrate (Christmas Special); How The Sing – Child's Day (Special); 6	Katarzyna Cichopek
2008–2009	4 (3rd episode); 5	Joanna Liszowska
2020	7	Michalina Sosna
2020	7	Mariusz Czerkawski

== The judging panel ==
Years	Series	Judge
2007–2009	1–6; How They Celebrate (Christmas Special); How The Sing – Child's Day (Special)	Edyta Górniak
2007–2009	1–6; How They Celebrate (Christmas Special); How The Sing – Child's Day (Special)	Elżbieta Zapendowska
2007–2009	1–6; How They Celebrate (Christmas Special); How The Sing – Child's Day (Special)	Rudi Schuberth
2020	7	Helena Vondráčková
2020	7	Majka Jeżowska
2020	7	Mariusz Kałamaga

=== 4th Judge ===
Episode	1 Season	2 Season	3 Season	4 Season	5 Season
1	–	–	–	Adam Sztaba	Katarzyna Cichopek
2	–	–	Joanna Kurowska	Piotr Rubik	Marcin Miller
3	Piotr Szwedes	Dariusz Jakubowski	Tomasz Bednarek	Paweł Rurak-Sokal	Andrzej Piaseczny
4	Dominika Figurska	Piotr Skarga	Anna Janocha	Tomasz Karolak	Jan Borysewicz
5	Małgorzata Lewińska	Małgorzata Teodorska	Wojciech Medyński	Michał Wiśniewski	Mariusz Pudzianowski
6	Małgorzata Ostrowska-Królikowska	Aleksandra Woźniak	Michał Koterski	Stachursky	Justyna Steczkowska
7	Marek Siudym	Katarzyna Sowińska	Monika Dryl	Krzysztof Cugowski	Marek Starybrat
8	Andrzej Nejman	Katarzyna Zielińska	Dariusz Kordek	Dariusz Maciborek	Łukasz Zagrobelny
9	Łukasz Płoszajski	Jakub Przebindowski	Grażyna Szapołowska	Jacek Cygan	Ryszard Rynkowski
10	Włodzimierz Matuszak	Joanna Trzepiecińska	Aneta Zając	Piotr Kupicha	Łukasz Golec
11	Marzena Kipel-Sztuka	Jakub Tolak	Olga Bończyk	Grzegorz Skawiński	Beata Kozidrak; Damian Aleksander
12	Edyta Herbuś	Mikołaj Krawczyk	–	Maryla Rodowicz; Basia Balbierz	–
13	Robert Moskwa	Patricia Kazadi	Kacper Kuszewski	–	–

== Seasons ==
Season	# of Stars	# of Weeks	Season premiere Date	Season finale Date	Winner	Runner-up	Third place	Other contestants (in order from 4th to last place)
1 – Spring 2007	13	13	March 3, 2007	June 2, 2007	Agnieszka Włodarczyk	Natasza Urbańska	Robert Moskwa	Edyta Herbuś, MarzenaKipel-Sztuka, WłodzimierzMatuszak, ŁukaszPłoszajski, Andrzej Nejman, Marek Siudym, Małgorzata Ostrowska-Królikowska, Małgorzata Lewińska, Dominika Figurska, Piotr Szwedes
2 – Autumn 2007	13	13	September 8, 2007	December 15, 2007	Joanna Liszowska	Piotr Polk	Patricia Kazadi	Mikołaj Krawczyk, Jakub Tolak, Joanna Trzepiecińska, Jakub Przebindowski, Katarzyna Zielińska, Katarzyna Sowińska, Aleksandra Woźniak, Małgorzata Teodorska, Piotr Skarga, Dariusz Jakubowski
3 – Spring 2008	13	13	March 8, 2008	May 31, 2008	Krzysztof Respondek	Joanna Jabłczyńska	Kacper Kuszewski	Olga Bończyk, Aneta Zając, Grażyna Szapołowska, Dariusz Kordek, Monika Dryl, Michał Koterski, Wojciech Medyński, Anna Janocha, Tomasz Bednarek, Joanna Kurowska
4 – Autumn 2008	15	13	September 6, 2008	December 6, 2008	Artur Chamski	Karolina Nowakowska	Aleksandra Szwed	Tomasz Stockinger, Anna Mucha, Elżbieta Romanowska, Żora Koroliow, Łukasz Dziemidok, Monika Mrozowska, Jacek Poniedziałek, Katarzyna Galica, Jerzy Zelnik, Jolanta Fraszyńska, Jacek Kawalec, Alżbeta Lenska
5 – Spring 2009	14	12	March 7, 2009	May 23, 2009	Laura Samojłowicz	Maciej Jachowski	Robert Kudelski	Aleksandra Zienkiewicz, Krzysztof Hanke, Bożena Dykiel, Maria Niklińska, Jacek Borkowski, Samuel Palmer, Aleksandra Nieśpielak, Daniel Wieleba, Katarzyna Żak, Marcin Kwaśny, Andrzej Deskur
6 – Autumn 2009	11	10	September 12, 2009	November 23, 2009	Krzysztof Respondek	Agnieszka Włodarczyk	Artur Chamski	Joanna Liszowska, Patricia Kazadi, Robert Kudelski, Laura Samojłowicz, Joanna Jabłczyńska, Karolina Nowakowska, Maciej Jachowski, Robert Moskwa
7 - Spring 2020	11	10	February 28, 2020	March 13, 2020	Przemysław Babiarz, Beata Chmielowska-Olech, Tadeusz Chudecki, Aleksiej Jarowienko, Jacek Lenartowicz, Monika Pyrek, Marcel Sabat, Milena Sadowska, Aleksandra Szwed, Marcin Urbaś, 11. Robert Koszucki			

=== How They Celebrate (Christmas Special) ===
Running order

Star	Song
Agnieszka Włodarczyk	"Gdy śliczna panna"
Joanna Liszowska	Mariah Carey - "All I Want for Christmas Is You"
Katarzyna Cichopek	"Lulujże Jezuniu"
Katarzyna Sowińska; Włodzimierz Matuszak	"Wśród nocnej ciszy"
Edyta Górniak; Rudi Schuberth	"Anioł Pasterzom Mówił"
Patricia Kazadi; Małgorzata Lewińska; Dominika Figurska	De Su - "Kto wie?"
Łukasz Płoszajski; Marzena Kipel-Sztuka; Dariusz Jakubowski	Czerwone Gitary - "Jest taki dzień"
Edyta Herbuś; Jakub Tolak	Mieczysław Szcześniak & Kayah - "Raduj się świecie"
Joanna Trzepiecińska; Andrzej Nejman	Wham! - "Last Christmas"
Aleksandra Woźniak; Jakub Przebidnowski	John Lennon - "Happy Christmas"
Małgorzata Teodorska	Dean Martin - "Let It Snow! Let It Snow! Let It Snow!"

=== How The Sing – Child's Day ===
Individual judges scores in charts below (given in parentheses) are listed in this order from left to right: Agnieszka Włodarczyk, Krzysztof Respondek, Artur Chamski, Laura Samojłowicz.

Running order

Star	Score	Song
Edyta Górniak; Elżbieta Zapendowska; Małgorzata Żak; Rudi Schuberth	6.0 (6,6,6,6)	Tokens - "Lion Sleeps Tonight"

Individual judges scores in charts below (given in parentheses) are listed in this order from left to right: Edyta Górniak, Rudi Schuberth, Elżbieta Zapendowska, Małgorzata Żak

Running order

Star	Score	Song
Robert Kudelski; Olga Bończyk	6.0 (6,6,6,6)	Andrzej Piaseczny - "Chodź, przytul, przebacz"
Joanna Liszowska	6.0 (6,6,6,6)	Feel - "A gdy jest już ciemno"
Robert Kudelski; Krzysztof Hanke; Dariusz Kordek; Dariusz Jakubowski	6.0 (6,6,6,6)	VOX - "Bananowy song"
Jakub Tolak; Andrzej Nejman; Daniel Wielaba; Maciej Jachowski; Żora Koroliow	5.6 (6,5,6,5.5)	Bee Gees - "How Deep Is Your Love"
Agnieszka Włodarczyk	6.0 (6,6,6,6)	Varius Manx - "Pocałuj noc"
Aleksandra Zienkiewicz; Aneta Zając; Mikołaj Krawczyk; Łukasz Dziemidok	5.9 (6, 6, 5.5, 6)	The Rembrandts - "I'll Be There For You"
Aleksandra Szwed; Karolina Nowakowska; Patricia Kazadi; Monika Mrozowska	6.0 (6,6,6,6)	Spice Girls - "Wannabe"
Agnieszka Włodarczyk, Joanna Liszowska, Artur Chamski, Krzysztof Respondek, Laura Samojłowicz	-	Songs from movie
Agnieszka Włodarczyk, Joanna Liszowska, Artur Chamski, Krzysztof Respondek, Laura Samojłowicz	-	Songs from movie
Rudi Schuberth & Wały Jagiellońskie	-	Wały Jagiellońskie - "Monika dziewczyna ratownika"
All Stars	-	Michael Jackson - "We Are the World"

== Statistics ==
=== Perfect 12's (6.0+6.0) ===
Celebrity	Season	Episode	Songs
Agnieszka Włodarczyk	1	10	Deszcze niespokojne Och, życie, kocham cię nad życie
Agnieszka Włodarczyk	1	11	Dziś prawdziwych Cyganów już nie ma I'm so excited
Natasza Urbańska	1	11	Jest taki samotny dom Private dancer
Joanna Liszowska	2	8	Psalm dla ciebie Strong enough
Piotr Polk	2	8	Something stupid Za młodzi, za starzy
Piotr Polk	2	9	Yellow submarine Hotel California
Piotr Polk	2	13	Dziś prawdziwych Cyganów już nie ma Mambo number five
Joanna Trzepiecińska	2	8	Something stupid Over the rainbow
Jakub Przebindowski	2	8	Psalm dla ciebie Can't take my eyes of you
Olga Bończyk	3	10	Serca gwiazd Zatańczysz ze mną jeszcze raz
Kacper Kuszewski	3	12	Z tobą chcę oglądać świat Tajemnice Mundialu
Joanna Jabłczyńska	3	12	Radość najpiękniejszych lat Futbol
Krzysztof Respondek	3	12	Naiwne pytania Do boju, Polsko!
Aleksandra Szwed	4	12	Baila; Zanim zrozumiesz
Tomasz Stockinger	4	12	Acapulco; Just a gigolo
Laura Samojłowicz	5	9	Laciate mi cantare Nie budzcie marzeń ze snu
Maciej Jachowski	5	9	Senza una donna Wznieś serce nad zło
Krzysztof Hanke	5	9	Nie płacz, kiedy odjadę Baby, ach te baby!
Krzysztof Respondek	6	5	Pokaż na co cię stać Pamięć
Artur Chamski	6	5	Pokaż na co cię stać New York, New York
Joanna Liszowska	6	5	Lady marmolade Life is a cabaret
Patricia Kazadi	6	5	Sing-Sing; Let the sunshine in
Joanna Liszowska	6	6	Dziś prawdziwych Cyganów już nie ma Śpij kochany, śpij
Agnieszka Włodarczyk	6	6	Nie żałuję Powiedz
Krzysztof Respondek	6	6	When I need you Bal wszystkich świętych
Krzysztof Respondek	6	9	La donna mobile Niepokonan
Agnieszka Włodarczyk	6	9	Habanera; Always
Joanna Liszowska	6	9	Libiamo ne lieti calic Still loving you
Artur Chamski	6	10	Livin'la vida loca Black or white

=== Perfect 18's (6.0+6.0+6.0) ===
Celebrity	Season	Episode	Songs
Natasza Urbańska	1	12	Czerwone korale Who wants to live for ever? Mamo, nasza mamo
Joanna Liszowska	2	13	I will survive Kolorowe jarmarki Sunny
Maciej Jachowski	5	12	S.O.S. Czas nas uczy pogody I want to know, what love is
Agnieszka Włodarczyk	6	10	Bailamos; The way you make me fell Daj mi tę noc

=== Perfect 24's (6.0+6.0+6.0+6.0) ===
Celebrity	Season	Episode	Songs
Krzysztof Respondek	3	13	Nie mogę ci wiele dać Kryzysowa narzeczona Hakuna matata Wakacje z blondynką
Joanna Jabłczyńska	3	13	Sway; Zawsze tam, gdzie ty Wyginam śmiało ciało Piechotą do lata

== Average Scores of All Stars ==
Those in bold are couples who won the competition.

Rank by average	Place	Celebrity	Perfect 6.0s	Total	Number of vote songs	Season	Average
1	**1st**	**Krzysztof Respondek**	13	127	22	3	5.77
2	**1st**	**Joanna Liszowska**	10	114.8	20	2	5.74
3	2nd	Natasza Urbańska	9	120.3	21	1	5.73
4	**1st**	**Laura Samojłowicz**	6	96.8	17	5	5.7
5	2nd	Piotr Polk	9	108.1	19	2	5.69
6	3rd	Kacper Kuszewski	4	107.5	19	3	5.66
7	4th	Olga Bończyk	5	73.4	13	3	5.65
8	2nd	Joanna Jabłczyńska	8	124.6	22	3	5.63
9	8th	Monika Dryl	0	39.4	7	3	5.62
10	5th	Patricia Kazadi	4	56.1	10	6	5.61
11	**1st**	**Artur Chamski**	6	95.1	17	4	5.59
12	6th	Bożena Dykiel	2	55.9	10	5	5.59
13	**1st**	**Agnieszka Włodarczyk**	9	117.1	21	1	5.57
14	3rd	Patricia Kazadi	5	100.3	18	2	5.57
15	**1st**	**Krzysztof Respondek**	8	94.3	17	6	5.54
16	2nd	Maciej Jachowski	6	94.1	17	5	5.53
17	3rd	Robert Kudelski	3	88.6	16	5	5.53
18	4th	Joanna Liszowska	6	77.5	14	6	5.53
19	6th	Grażyna Szapołowska	0	50.2	10	3	5.52
20	2nd	Karolina Nowakowska	6	93.8	17	4	5.51
21	12th	Jerzy Zelnik	0	22	4	4	5.5
22	5th	Krzysztof Hanke	5	71.4	13	5	5.49
23	3rd	Artur Chamski	7	87	16	6	5.43
24	2nd	Agnieszka Włodarczyk	8	92	17	6	5.41
25	4th	Aleksandra Zienkiewicz	1	81	15	5	5.4
26	6th	Joanna Trzepiecińska	2	53.9	10	2	5.39
27	3rd	Aleksandra Szwed	3	86.2	16	4	5.38
28	11th	Katarzyna Żak	0	16	3	5	5.34
29	8th	Jaonna Jabłczyńska	2	26.6	5	6	5.32
30	7th	Jacek Borkowski	2	42.1	8	5	5.27
31	7th	Jakub Przebindowski	2	42.1	8	2	5.26
32	7th	Laura Samojłowicz	2	30.8	6	6	5.13
33	4th	Tomasz Stockinger	4	76.9	15	4	5.12
34	7th	Dariusz Kordek	1	41	8	3	5.12
35	10th	Wojciech Medyński	0	20.4	4	3	5.1
35	13th	Andrzej Deskur	0	5.1	1	5	5.1
37	9th	Marek Siudym	0	25.2	5	1	5.04
38	8th	Samuel Palmer	1	30.1	6	5	5.02
39	3rd	Robert Moskwa	1	84.8	17	1	4.99
40	4th	Mikołaj Krawczyk	1	70	14	2	4.98
41	5th	Jakub Tolak	2	69.5	14	2	4.96
42	8th	Katarzyna Zielińska	0	34.4	7	2	4.92
43	6th	Elżbieta Romanowska	1	49	10	4	4.9
43	9th	Karolina Nowakowska	0	14.7	3	6	4.9
45	8th	Andrzej Nejman	0	33.9	7	1	4.85
46	9th	Michał Koterski	0	24	5	3	4.8
46	9th	Monika Mrozowska	0	33.6	7	4	4.8
48	10th	Daniel Wieleba	0	19.1	4	5	4.78
49	9th	Katarzyna Sowińska	0	23.7	5	2	4.74
50	13th	Jolanta Fraszyńska	0	14.2	3	4	4.73
51	9th	Aleksandra Nieśpielak	0	23.6	4	5	4.72
52	5th	Anna Mucha	1	55.9	12	4	4.65
53	12th	Marcin Kwaśny	0	9.3	2	5	4.65
55	5th	Marzena Kipiel-Sztuka	0	55.6	12	1	4.64
56	5th	Aneta Zając	0	55.6	12	3	4.63
57	14th	Jacek Kawalec	0	9.1	2	4	4.55
58	12th	Tomasz Bednarek	0	8.8	2	3	4.4
59	13th	Joanna Kurowska	0	4.3	1	3	4.3
60	6th	Włodzimierz Matuszak	0	42.3	10	1	4.23
61	10th	Aleksandra Woźniak	0	16.8	4	2	4.2
62	7th	Łukasz Płoszajski	0	33.2	8	1	4.15
63	6th	Robert Kudelski	1	37.3	9	6	4.14
64	11th	Małgorzata Lewińska	0	12.4	3	1	4.13
65	4th	Edyta Herbuś	0	57.8	14	1	4.12
66	11th	Anna Janocha	0	12.3	3	3	4.1
66	10th	Maciej Jachowski	0	8.2	2	6	4.1
68	10th	Małgorzata Ostrowska-Królikowska	0	16.3	4	1	4.08
69	11th	Małgorzata Teodorska	0	12.1	3	2	4.04
70	7th	Żora Koroliow	0	36.3	9	4	4.03
71	8th	Łukasz Dziemidok	0	26.9	7	4	3.84
72	10th	Jacek Poniedziałek	0	7.6	2	4	3.8
73	11th	Katarzyna Galica	0	18.6	5	4	3.72
74	13th	Piotr Szwedes	0	3.7	1	1	3.7
75	12th	Dominika Figurska	0	7.3	2	1	3.65
76	11th	Robert Moskwa	0	3.5	1	6	3.5
78	12th	Piotr Skarga	0	6.8	2	2	3.4
79	15th	Alżbieta Leńska	0	3.3	1	4	3.3
80	13th	Dariusz Jakubowski	0	2.8	1	2	2.8
Rank by average	Place	Couple	Perfect 6.0s	Total	Number of vote songs	Season	Average

== Viewing figures ==
Episode	1st edition	2nd edition	3rd edition	4th edition	5th edition	6th edition	7th edition
1	5 689 616 (March 3, 2007)	3 490 226 (September 8, 2007)	3 882 171 (March 8, 2008)	2 902 586 (September 6, 2008)	3 574 107 (March 7, 2009)	2 614 126 (September 12, 2009)	(February 28, 2020)
2	5 034 580 (March 10, 2007)	3 988 506 (September 15, 2007)	3 721 652 (March 15, 2008)	2 915 086 (September 13, 2008)	3 455 327 (March 14, 2009)	2 762 120 (September 19, 2009)	(March 6, 2020)
3	4 824 807 (March 17, 2007)	3 719 651 (September 22, 2007)	3 691 033 (March 22, 2008)	3 516 900 (September 20, 2008)	3 217 357 (March 21, 2009)	2 478 670 (September 26, 2009)	(March 13, 2020)
4	4 598 613 (March 24, 2007)	3 887 115 (September 29, 2007)	3 869 518 (March 29, 2008)	3 056 273 (September 27, 2008)	3 365 570 (March 28, 2009)	2 551 552 (October 3, 2009)	—
5	4 565 689 (March 31, 2007)	4 230 733 (October 6, 2007)	4 049 315 (April 5, 2008)	3 172 681 (4 October 2008)	2 930 012 (April 4, 2009)	2 671 967 (October 10, 2009)	—
6	4 134 708 (April 14, 2007)	4 231 970 (October 20, 2007)	3 787 760 (April 12, 2008)	2 870 249 (October 11, 2008)	2 462 815 (April 11, 2009)	2 324 515 (October 17, 2009)	—
7	3 798 140 (April 21, 2007)	4 210 394 (October 27, 2007)	3 643 252 (April 19, 2008)	2 846 947 (October 18, 2008)	2 958 539 (April 18, 2009)	2 594 931 (October 31, 2009)	—
8	4 244 063 (April 28, 2007)	4 309 850 (November 3, 2007)	3 611 380 (April 26, 2008)	3 038 753 (October 25, 2008)	3 122 794 (April 25, 2009)	3 014 888 (November 7, 2009)	—
9	4 204 654 (May 5, 2007)	4 049 478 (November 10, 2007)	3 182 446 (May 3, 2008)	3 498 515 (November 8, 2008)	2 762 761 (May 2, 2009)	3 141 112 (November 14, 2009)	—
10	4 726 703 (May 12, 2007)	3 853 187 (November 24, 2007)	3 128 871 (May 10, 2008)	3 377 363 (November 8, 2008)	2 601 118 (May 9, 2009)	3 563 374 (November 21, 2009)	—
11	3 949 779 (May 19, 2007)	4 216 436 (December 1, 2007)	3 383 989 (May 17, 2008)	3 351 051 (November 22, 2008)	2 966 945 (May 16, 2009)	—	—
12	3 708 186 (May 26, 2007)	4 311 673 (December 8, 2007)	3 351 302 (May 24, 2008)	3 121 808 (November 29, 2008)	3 338 217 (May 23, 2009)	—	—
13	4 977 556 (June 2, 2007)	4 758 730 (December 15, 2007)	3 284 740 (May 31, 2008)	4 255 764 (December 6, 2008)	—	—	—
Average viewing	4 507 262	4 109 762	3 583 305	3 234 688	3 077 198	2 785 239	
