= Jak oni śpiewają season 2 =

Jak oni śpiewają
- Season 2
- Hosted by: Katarzyna Cichopek; Krzysztof Ibisz
- Judges: Edyta Górniak; Rudi Schuberth; Elżbieta Zapendowska
- Winner: Joanna Liszowska
- Runner-up: Piotr Polk

Release
- Original network: Polsat
- Original release: September 8 – December 15, 2007

Season chronology
- ← Previous; Season 1 Next → Season 3

The 2nd season of Jak oni śpiewają, the Polish edition of Soapstar Superstar, started on September 8, 2007, and ended on December 15, 2007. It was broadcast by Polsat. Katarzyna Cichopek and Krzysztof Ibisz as the hosts, and the judges were: Edyta Górniak, Elżbieta Zapendowska and Rudi Schuberth.

== Stars ==
Celebrity	Character	Soap	Status
Dariusz Jakubowski	Dariusz Wójcik	"Na dobre i na złe" TVP2	Eliminated 1st on September 22, 2007
Piotr Skarga	Piotr Nowik	"Mamuśki" Polsat	Eliminated 2nd on September 29, 2007
Małgorzata Teodorska	Irka Tosiek	"Plebania" TVP1	Eliminated 3rd on October 6, 2007
Aleksandra Woźniak	Agata Gabriel	"Złotopolscy" TVP2	Eliminated 4th on October 20, 2007
Katarzyna Sowińska	Katarzyna Tudor	"Tylko miłość" Polsat	Eliminated 5th on October 27, 2007
Katarzyna Zielińska	Marta Walawska	"Barwy szczęścia" TVP2	Eliminated 6th on November 3, 2007
Jakub Przebindowski	Karol Kopczyński	"Na Wspólnej" TVN	Eliminated 7th on November 10, 2007
Joanna Trzepiecińska	Alutka Kossoń	"Rodzina zastępcza" Polsat	Eliminated 8th on November 24, 2007
Jakub Tolak	Daniel Ross	"Klan" TVP1	Eliminated 9th on December 1, 2007
Mikołaj Krawczyk	Paweł Krzyżanowski	"Pierwsza miłość" Polsat	Eliminated 10th on December 8, 2007
Patricia Kazadi	Anna Chełmicka	"Egzamin z życia" TVP2	Third Place on December 15, 2009
Piotr Polk	Ryszrad Majewski	"Samo życie" Polsat	Second Place on December 15, 2009
Joanna Liszowska	Dorota Lewkiewicz	"Na dobre i na złe" TVP2	Winners on December 15, 2009

== Guest Performances ==
Episode	Date	Artist(s)	Song(s)
11	December 1, 2007	Actors from TV series "Halo, Hans"	Song from "Halo, Hans"

== Scores ==
Couple	Place	1	2	3	4	5	6	7	8	9	10	11	12	13
Joanna Liszowska	1	–	5.8	5.8	5.5	5.8	5.8	6.0	6.0+6.0=12.0	5.4+6.0=11.4	4.8+6.0=10.8	5.3+6.0=11.3	5.5+6.0+5.9=17.4	6.0+6.0+6.0=18.0
Piotr Polk	2	–	5.2	5.3	5.3	6.0	5.8	5.4	6.0+6.0=12.0	6.0+6.0=12.0	5.6+5.6=11.2	5.3+6.0=11.3	6.0+5.8+5.6=17.4	6.0+6.0=12.0
Patricia Kazadi	3	–	4.7	5.8	5.8	4.8	5.8	6.0	5.7+6.0=11.7	5.3+5.8=11.1	4.9+6.0=10.9	5.3+6.0=11.3	5.9+5.8+5.9=17.6	6.0
Mikołaj Krawczyk	4	–	4.5	4.9	4.6	4.4	4.9	4.8	5.0+5.5=10.5	4.9+5.8=10.7	5.3+6.0=11.3	5.3+5.0=10.3		
Jakub Tolak	5	–	4.3	5.0	4.8	5.3	5.9	4.8	5.7+5.9=11.6	6.0+5.9=11.9	5.3+6.0=11.3	5.3		
Joanna Trzepiecińska	6	–	5.2	5.5	5.9	5.0	4.9	5.3	6.0+6.0=12.0	5.5+5.0=10.5				
Jakub Przebindowski	7	–	4.0	5.0	5.8	4.8	5.3	5.5	6.0+6.0=12.0					
Katarzyna Zielińska	8	–	4.5	4.3	4.9	5.8	5.0	5.3	5.0					
Katarzyna Sowińska	9	–	4.5	4.5	5.6	4.0	4.8							
Aleksandra Woźniak	10	–	4.0	3.5	4.4	5.0								
Małgorzata Teodorska	11	–	3.5	4.0	4.6									
Piotr Skarga	12	–	2.5	4.4										
Dariusz Jakubowski	13	–	2.8											

Red numbers indicate the lowest score for each week.
Green numbers indicate the highest score for each week.
indicates the star eliminated that week.
indicates the returning stars that finished in the bottom two.
indicates the star who has got immunitet

=== Average Chart ===
Place	Star	Average	Total	Best Score	Worst Score	Number of songs
1.	Joanna Liszowska	5.74	114.80	6.00	4.70	20
2.	Piotr Polk	5.69	108.10	6.00	5.00	19
3.	Patricia Kazadi	5.58	100.30	6.00	4.60	18
4.	Joanna Trzepiecińska	5.39	53.90	6.00	4.80	10
5.	Jakub Przebindowski	5.26	42.10	6.00	4.00	8
6.	Mikołaj Krawczyk	5.00	70	6.00	4.30	14
7.	Jakub Tolak	4.96	69.5	6,00	4.30	14
8.	Katarzyna Zielińska	4.92	34.40	5.70	4.20	7
9.	Katarzyna Sowińska	4.74	23.70	5.60	4.00	5
10.	Aleksandra Woźniak	4.20	16.80	5.00	3.50	4
11.	Małgorzata Teodorska	4.04	12.10	4.60	3.50	3
12.	Piotr Skarga	3.40	6.80	4.30	2.50	2
13.	Dariusz Jakubowski	2.80	2.80	2.80	2.80	1
Everystar						

Judge/Episode	1	2	3	4	5	6	7	8	9	10	11	12	13	Average
Edyta Górniak	-	4.0	4.4	4.9	4.6	5.0	4.8	5.8	5.3	5.2	5.3	5.6	6.0	5.0
Elżbieta Zapendowska	-	3.6	4.1	4.3	4.6	4.7	5.0	5.5	5.4	5.3	5.2	5.6	6.0	4.9
Rudi Schuberth	-	5.1	5.1	5.4	5.3	5.5	5.6	6.0	5.7	5.6	6.0	6.0	6.0	5.5

=== The Best Score (6.0) ===
No	Star	Song	Episode	6.0
1	Piotr Polk	"Pretty Woman"	5	9
1	Piotr Polk	"Somethin' Stupid"	8	9
1	Piotr Polk	"Za młodzi, za starzy"	8	9
1	Piotr Polk	"Yellow Submarine"	9	9
1	Piotr Polk	"Hotel California"	9	9
1	Piotr Polk	"What A Wonderful World"	11	9
1	Piotr Polk	"Rock and Roll Is King"	12	9
1	Piotr Polk	"Dziś prawdziwych cyganów już nie ma"	13	9
1	Piotr Polk	"Mambo No. 5"	13	9
4	Joanna Trzepiecińska	"Somethin' Stupid"	8	2
4	Joanna Trzepiecińska	"Over The Rainbow"	8	2
5	Jakub Tolak	"Help!"	9	2
5	Jakub Tolak	"Warszawa"	10	2
9	Mikołaj Krawczyk	"Jesteś szalona"	10	1
10	Patricia Kazadi	"Lovefool"	5	5
10	Patricia Kazadi	"The Power Of Love"	8	5
10	Patricia Kazadi	"Killing Me Softly"	10	5
10	Patricia Kazadi	"Nie bądź taki szybki Bill"	11	5
10	Patricia Kazadi	"Thriller"	13	5
11	Joanna Liszowska	"Moje miasto nocą"	7	10
11	Joanna Liszowska	"Psalm dla Ciebie"	8	10
11	Joanna Liszowska	"Strong Enough"	8	10
11	Joanna Liszowska	"To był piękne dni"	9	10
11	Joanna Liszowska	"Niech żyje bal"	10	10
11	Joanna Liszowska	"When the Rain Begins to Fall"	11	10
11	Joanna Liszowska	"Bal wszystkich świętych"	12	10
11	Joanna Liszowska	"I Will Survive"	13	10
11	Joanna Liszowska	"Kolorowe jarmarki"	13	10
11	Joanna Liszowska	"Sunny"	13	10
13	Jakub Przebindowski	"Psalm dla Ciebie"	8	2
13	Jakub Przebindowski	"Can't Take My Eyes Off Of You"	8	2

== Episodes ==
=== Week 1 ===
Running order

Star	Score	Song
Piotr Polk	–	Zucchero Fornaciari – "Baila (Sexy Thing)"
Aleksandra Woźniak	–	2+1 – "Windą do nieba"
Katarzyna Sowińska	–	Amanda Lear – "Enigma (Give a Bit of Mmh to Me)"
Joanna Trzepiecińska	–	Cher – "Dove l'Amore"
Jakub Tolak	–	Mr. Zoob – "Mój jest ten kawałek podłogi"
Katarzyna Zielińska	–	Ewelina Flinta – "Żałuję"
Dariusz Jakubowski	–	Afric Simone – "Hafanana"
Małgorzata Teodorska	–	Maanam – "Kocham Cię, kochanie moje"
Mikołaj Krawczyk	–	Yugopolis & Paweł Kukiz – "Miasto budzi się"
Patricia Kazadi	–	Sugababes – "Push The Button"
Joanna Liszowska	–	Gloria Estefan – "Conga"
Piotr Skarga	–	Lady Pank – "Strach się bać"
Jakub Przebindowski	–	Michael Bublé – "Sway"

=== Week 2 ===
Individual judges scores in charts below (given in parentheses) are listed in this order from left to right: Edyta Górniak, Elżbieta Zapendowska, Rudi Schuberth.

Running order

Star	Score	Song
Piotr Polk	5.1 (5,4.5,6)	Garou – "Gitan"
Aleksandra Woźniak	4.0 (4,3,5)	Ricchi e Poveri – "Mamma Maria"
Katarzyna Sowińska	4.5 (4.5,4,5)	Eurythmics – "Sweet Dreams (Are Made of This)"
Joanna Trzepiecińska	5.1 (5,4.5,6)	Bajm – "Myśli i słowa"
Jakub Tolak	4.3 (4,4,5)	Robert Gawliński – "Nie stało się nic"
Katarzyna Zielińska	4.5 (4,4,5.5)	Kylie Minogue – "Can't Get You Out of My Head"
Dariusz Jakubowski	2.8 (1,2.5,5)	Ryszard Rynkowski – "Dziewczyny lubią brąz"
Małgorzata Teodorska	3.5 (3.5,2,5)	Village People – "Y.M.C.A."
Mikołaj Krawczyk	4.5 (5,3.5,5)	Stachursky – "Z każdym Twym oddechem"
Patricia Kazadi	4.6 (5,4,5)	Whitney Houston – "I Wanna Dance With Somebody"
Joanna Liszowska	5.6 (6,5,6)	Tina Turner – "Simply The Best"
Piotr Skarga	2.5 (1,2.5,4)	Krzysztof Krawczyk – "Chciałem być"
Jakub Przebindowski	4.0 (4,3.5,4.5)	Boney M – "Rivers of Babilon"

=== Week 3 ===
Individual judges scores in charts below (given in parentheses) are listed in this order from left to right: Edyta Górniak, Elżbieta Zapendowska, Rudi Schuberth, Dariusz Jakubowski

Running order

Star	Score	Song
Piotr Polk	5.0 (5,5,5,5)	Lionel Richie – "Hello"
Aleksandra Woźniak	3.5 (3,3,4,4)	ABBA – "Knowing Me, Knowing You"
Katarzyna Sowińska	4.8 (5,4,5,5)	Tanita Tikaram – "Twist In My Sobriety"
Joanna Trzepiecińska	5.5 (5,5,6,6)	Skaldowie – "Medytacje wiejskiego listonosza"
Jakub Tolak	5.0 (4,5,5,6)	Andrzej Piaseczny – "Mocniej"
Katarzyna Zielińska	4.2 (4,3,5,5)	Bolter – "Daj mi tę noc"
Małgorzata Teodorska	4.0 (3,3,5,5)	Kasia Cerekwicka – "Na kolana"
Mikołaj Krawczyk	4.8 (4,3.5,6,6)	Ricky Martin – "Livin' La Vida Loca"
Patricia Kazadi	5.7 (6,5,6,6)	Kayah – "Supermenka"
Joanna Liszowska	5.7 (6,5,6,6)	Danuta Rinn – "Gdzie Ci Mężczyźni?"
Piotr Skarga	4.3 (4,3.5,4,6)	Chuck Berry – "Let's Twist Again"
Jakub Przebindowski	5.0 (4,5,5,6)	Stevie Wonder – "I Just Called To Say I Love You"

=== Week 4 ===
Individual judges scores in charts below (given in parentheses) are listed in this order from left to right: Edyta Górniak, Elżbieta Zapendowska, Rudi Schuberth, Piotr Skarga

Running order

Star	Score	Song
Piotr Polk	5.2 (5,4,6,6)	Los Lobos – "Canción del Mariachi"
Aleksandra Woźniak	4.3 (3,3,5,6)	Belinda Carlisle – "La luna"
Katarzyna Sowińska	5.6 (6,4.5,6,6)	Maanam – "To tylko tango"
Joanna Trzepiecińska	5.8 (6,5.5,6,6)	Rod Stewart – "When I Need You"
Jakub Tolak	4.7 (4,4,5,6)	Bryan Adams – "Please Forgive Me"
Katarzyna Zielińska	4.8 (4,4.5,5,6)	In-Grid – "Tu es foutu"
Małgorzata Teodorska	4.6 (4,3.5,5,6)	Halina Frąckowiak – "Papierowy księżyc"
Mikołaj Krawczyk	4.6 (5,3.5,4,6)	Kobranocka – "Kocham Cię jak Irlandię"
Patricia Kazadi	5.7 (6,5,6,6)	Britney Spears – "Baby One More Time"
Joanna Liszowska	5.5 (5,5,6,6)	Cher – "The Shoop Shoop Song (It's in His Kiss)"
Jakub Przebindowski	5.7 (6,5,6,6)	Golec uOrkiestra – "Ściernisko"

=== Week 5 ===
Individual judges scores in charts below (given in parentheses) are listed in this order from left to right: Edyta Górniak, Elżbieta Zapendowska, Rudi Schuberth, Małgorzata Teodorska

Running order

Star	Score	Song
Piotr Polk	6.0 (6,6,6,6)	Roy Orbison – "Oh, Pretty Woman"
Aleksandra Woźniak	5.0 (5,4,5,6)	Kasia Kowalska – "To co dobre"
Katarzyna Sowińska	4.0 (2,4,4,6)	Justyna Steczkowska – "Za karę"
Joanna Trzepiecińska	5.0 (5,6,6,3)	Maryla Rodowicz – "Dziś prawdziwych cyganów już nie ma"
Jakub Tolak	5.2 (5,5,5,6)	Myslovitz – "Długość dźwięku samotności"
Katarzyna Zielińska	5.7 (6,5,6,6)	Janusz Laskowski – "Kolorowe jarmarki"
Mikołaj Krawczyk	4.3 (3,3.5,5,6)	The Rolling Stones – "(I Can't Get No) Satisfaction"
Patricia Kazadi	4.7 (4,4,5,6)	Wanda i Banda – "Nie będę Julią"
Joanna Liszowska	5.7 (6,5,6,6)	Gipsy Kings – "Bamboleo"
Jakub Przebindowski	4.7 (4,4,5,6)	Drupi – "Sereno é"

=== Week 6 ===
Individual judges scores in charts below (given in parentheses) are listed in this order from left to right: Edyta Górniak, Elżbieta Zapendowska, Rudi Schuberth, Aleksandra Woźniak

Running order

Star	Score	Song
Piotr Polk	5.7 (6,5,6,6)	Joe Dassin – "Et si tu n'existais pas"
Katarzyna Sowińska	4.8 (4,4,5,6)	Boney M – "One Way Ticket"
Joanna Trzepiecińska	4.8 (4,4.5,5,6)	2+1 – "Iść w stronę słońca"
Jakub Tolak	5.8 (6,5.5,6,6)	Lady Pank – "Zostawcie Titanica"
Katarzyna Zielińska	5.0 (5,4,5,6)	Brathanki – "W kinie, w Lublinie – kochaj mnie"
Mikołaj Krawczyk	4.8 (4,4.5,5,6)	Norbi – "Kobiety są gorące"
Patricia Kazadi	5.7 (5,6,6,6)	Christina Aguilera, P!nk, Lil' Kim & Mýa – "Lady Marmalade"
Joanna Liszowska	5.7 (6,5,6,6)	Barbra Streisand – "Woman In Love"
Jakub Przebindowski	5.2 (5,4,6,6)	Krzysztof Krawczyk – "Byle było tak"

ABBA MIX

Star	Song
Patricia Kazadi	"Dancing Queen"
Aleksandra Woźniak	"S.O.S."
Mikołaj Krawczyk & Katarzyna Sowińska	"Money Money Money"
Piotr Polk	"Thank You For The Music"
Katarzyna Zielińska	"Super Trouper"
Joanna Trzepiecińska & Jakub Przebindowski	"Fernando"
Joanna Liszowska	"Mamma Mia"
Jakub Tolak	"Waterloo"

=== Week 7 ===
Individual judges scores in charts below (given in parentheses) are listed in this order from left to right: Edyta Górniak, Elżbieta Zapendowska, Rudi Schuberth, Katarzyna Sowińska

Running order

Star	Score	Song
Piotr Polk	5.3 (4,5.5,6,6)	Dean Martin – "Everybody Loves Somebody"
Joanna Trzepiecińska	5.2 (4,5,6,6)	Simply Red – "If You Don't Know Me By Now"
Jakub Tolak	4.7 (4,4,5,6)	Jan Borysewicz & Paweł Kukiz – "Jeśli tylko chcesz"
Katarzyna Zielińska	5.2 (4,5,6,6)	Andrzej Rosiewicz – "Najwięcej witaminy"
Mikołaj Krawczyk	4.7 (4.5,3.5,5,6)	Artur Gadowski – "Ona jest ze snu"
Patricia Kazadi	6.0 (6,6,6,6)	The Cardigans – "Lovefool"
Joanna Liszowska	6.0 (6,6,6,6)	De Mono – "Moje miasto nocą"
Jakub Przebindowski	5.5 (6,5,5,6)	Piotr Szczepanik – "Kochać"

=== Week 8 ===
Individual judges scores in charts below (given in parentheses) are listed in this order from left to right: Edyta Górniak, Elżbieta Zapendowska, Rudi Schuberth

Running order

Star	Score	Song
Piotr Polk & Joanna Trzepiecińska	6.0 (6,6,6)	Robbie Williams & Nicole Kidman – "Somethin' Stupid"
Jakub Tolak & Patricia Kazadi	5.6 (6,5,6)	Olivia Newton-John & John Travolta – "You're the One That I Want"
Mikołaj Kraczyk & Katarzyna Zielińska	5.0 (5,4,6)	Ricchi e Poveri – "Sarà perché ti amo"
Jakub Przebindowski & Joanna Liszowska	6.0 (6,6,6)	Janusz Radek & Małgorzata Markiewicz – "Psalm dla Ciebie"

Individual judges scores in charts below (given in parentheses) are listed in this order from left to right: Edyta Górniak, Elżbieta Zapendowska, Rudi Schuberth, Katarzyna Zielińska

Running order

Star	Score	Song
Piotr Polk	6.0 (6,6,6,6)	Ryszard Rynkowski – "Za młodzi, za starzy"
Joanna Trzepiecińska	6.0 (6,6,6,6)	Judy Garland – "Over The Rainbow"
Jakub Tolak	5.8 (6,5.5,6,6)	Queen – "The Show Must Go On"
Mikołaj Krawczyk	5.5 (5,5,6,6)	Gipsy Kings – "La Bamba"
Patricia Kazadi	6.0 (6,6,6,6)	Jennifer Rush – "The Power Of Love"
Joanna Liszowska	6.0 (6,6,6,6)	Cher – "Strong Enough"
Jakub Przebindowski	6.0 (6,6,6,6)	Gloria Gaynor – "Can't Take My Eyes Off Of You"

=== Week 9 ===
Individual judges scores in charts below (given in parentheses) are listed in this order from left to right: Edyta Górniak, Elżbieta Zapendowska, Rudi Schuberth, Jakub Przebidnowski

Running order

Star	Score	Song
Piotr Polk	6.0 (6,6,6,6)	The Beatles – "Yellow Submarine"
Piotr Polk	6.0 (6,6,6,6)	The Eagles – "Hotel California"
Joanna Trzepiecińska	5.5 (5,5,6,6)	The Beatles – "Yesterday"
Joanna Trzepiecińska	5.0 (4,5,5,6)	Maryla Rodowicz – "Sing, sing"
Jakub Tolak	6.0 (6,6,6,6)	The Beatles – "Help!"
Jakub Tolak	5,8 (6,5.5,6,6)	O.N.A. – "Kiedy powiem sobie dość"
Mikołaj Krawczyk	4.8 (4,4.5,5,6)	The Beatles – "Twist and Shout"
Mikołaj Krawczyk	5.7 (6,5,6,6)	Lady Pank – "Zawsze tam gdzie ty"
Patricia Kazadi	5.2 (5,5,5,6)	The Beatles – "She Loves You"
Patricia Kazadi	5.7 (5,6,6,6)	The Doors – "Light My Fire
Joanna Liszowska	5.3 (5,5,5.5,6)	The Beatles – "All You Need Is Love"
Joanna Liszowska	6.0 (6,6,6,6)	Halina Kunicka – "To były piękne dni"

=== Week 10 ===
Individual judges scores in charts below (given in parentheses) are listed in this order from left to right: Edyta Górniak, Elżbieta Zapendowska, Rudi Schuberth, Joanna Trzepiecińska

Running order

Star	Score	Song
Piotr Polk	5.6 (5,5.5,6,6)	Kombii – "Pokolenie" duet with Grzegorz Skawiński
Piotr Polk	5.6 (5,5.5,6,6)	Burt Bacharach – "Raindrops Keep Falling On My Head"
Joanna Trzepiecińska	–	Alicja Majewska – "Być kobietą" duet with Alicja Majewska
Jakub Tolak	5.3 (5,5,5,6)	Gosia Andrzejewicz – "Pozwól żyć" duet with Gosia Andrzejewicz
Jakub Tolak	6.0 (6,6,6,6)	T.Love – "Warszawa"
Mikołaj Krawczyk	5.3 (5,5,5,6)	Golec uOrkiestra – "Lornetka" duet with Golec uOrkiestra
Mikołaj Krawczyk	6.0 (6,6,6,6)	Boys – "Jesteś szalona"
Patricia Kazadi	4.8 (4,4.5,5,6)	VOX – "Bananowy song" duet with Witold Paszt
Patricia Kazadi	6.0 (6,6,6,6)	The Fugees – "Killing Me Softly"
Joanna Liszowska	4.7 (4,4,5,6)	De Mono – "Zostańmy razem" duet with Andrzej Krzywy
Joanna Liszowska	6.0 (6,6,6,6)	Maryla Rodowicz – "Niech żyje bal"

=== Week 11 ===
Individual judges scores in charts below (given in parentheses) are listed in this order from left to right: Edyta Górniak, Elżbieta Zapendowska, Rudi Schuberth

Running order

Star	Score	Song
Piotr Polk	5.3 (5,5,6)	Herman Hupfeld – "As Time Goes By"
Mikołaj Krawczyk	5.3 (5,5,6)	Elektryczne gitary – "Kiler"
Patricia Kazadi	5.3 (5,5,6)	Whitney Houston – "I Will Always Love You"
Joanna Liszowska	5.3 (5,5,6)	Céline Dion – "My Heart Will Go On"
Jakub Tolak	5.3 (5,5,6)	The Troggs – "Love is all around"

Individual judges scores in charts below (given in parentheses) are listed in this order from left to right: Edyta Górniak, Elżbieta Zapendowska, Rudi Schuberth, Jakub Tolak

Running order

Star	Score	Song
Piotr Polk	6.0 (6,6,6,6)	Louis Armstrong – "What A Wonderful World"
Mikołaj Krawczyk	5.2 (5,4,6,6)	Czesław Niemen – "Płonąca stodoła"
Patricia Kazadi	6.0 (6,6,6,6)	Kasia Sobczyk – "Nie bądź taki Szybki Bill"
Joanna Liszowska	6.0 (6,6,6,6)	Jermaine Jackson – "When the Rain Begins to Fall"

=== Week 12 ===
Individual judges scores in charts below (given in parentheses) are listed in this order from left to right: Edyta Górniak, Elżbieta Zapendowska, Rudi Schuberth, Mikołaj Krawczyk

Running order

Star	Score	Song
Piotr Polk	5.6 (5,5.5,6,6)	Eric Clapton – "Tears In Heaven"
Piotr Polk	5,8 (6,5.5,6,6)	Czesław Niemen – "Pod papugami"
Piotr Polk	6.0 (6,6,6,6)	Electric Light Orchestra – "Rock 'n' Roll Is King"
Joanna Liszowska	5.5 (5,5,6,6)	The Animals – "House of the Rising Sun"
Joanna Liszowska	6.0 (6,6,6,6)	Budka Suflera – "Bal wszystkich świętych"
Joanna Liszowska	5.8 (6,5.5,6,6)	Wham! – "Careless Whisper"
Patricia Kazadi	5.8 (6,5.5,6,6)	Lombard – "Szklana pogoda"
Patricia Kazadi	5.7 (5,6,6,6)	Andrzej Dąbrowski – "Do zakochania jeden krok"
Patricia Kazadi	5.8 (6,5.5,6,6)	Katie Melua – "Nine Million Bicycles"

=== Week 13 ===
Individual judges scores in charts below (given in parentheses) are listed in this order from left to right: Edyta Górniak, Elżbieta Zapendowska, Rudi Schuberth.

Running order

Star	Score	Song
Joanna Liszowska	6.0 (6,6,6,6)	Gloria Gaynor – "I Will Survive"
Patricia Kazadi	6.0 (6,6,6,6)	Michael Jackson – "Thriller"

Individual judges scores in charts below (given in parentheses) are listed in this order from left to right: Edyta Górniak, Elżbieta Zapendowska, Rudi Schuberth, Patricia Kazadi

Running order

Star	Score	Song
Joanna Liszowska	6.0 (6,6,6,6)	Janusz Laskowski – "Kolorowe jarmarki"
Joanna Liszowska	6.0 (6,6,6,6)	Boney M – "Sunny"
Piotr Polk	6.0 (6,6,6,6)	Maryla Rodowicz – "Dziś prawdziwych cyganów już nie ma"
Piotr Polk	6.0 (6,6,6,6)	Lou Bega – "Mambo No. 5"

Other Performance

Star	Song
Jakub Tolak	Wojciech Kilar – "W stepie szerokim"
Piotr Skarga	Wojciech Kilar – "W stepie szerokim"
Dariusz Jakubowski	Wojciech Kilar – "W stepie szerokim"
Mikołaj Krawczyk	Wojciech Kilar – "W stepie szerokim"
Jakub Przebindowski	Wojciech Kilar – "W stepie szerokim"
Aleksandra Woźniak	2+1 – "Chodź, pomaluj mój świat"
Jakub Tolak	2+1 – "Chodź, pomaluj mój świat"
Małgorzata Teodorska	Wojciech Gąsowski – "Tylko wróć"
Mikołaj Krawczyk	Wojciech Gąsowski – "Tylko wróć"
Piotr Skarga	Wojciech Gąsowski – "Tylko wróć"
Jakub Przebindowski	Wojciech Gąsowski – "Tylko wróć"
Joanna Trzepiecińska	Seweryn Krajewski – "Uciekaj serce moje"
Katarzyna Sowińska	Edmund Fetting – "Deszcze niespokojne"
Katarzyna Zielińska	Edmund Fetting – "Deszcze niespokojne"

== Rating Figures ==
Episode	Date	Official rating 4+	Share 4+	Share 16–49
1	September 8, 2007	3 490 226	23,88%	22,18%
2	September 15, 2007	3 988 506	28,97%	28,95%
3	September 22, 2007	3 719 651	28,07%	27,31%
4	September 29, 2007	3 887 115	27,45%	25,57%
5	October 6, 2007	4 230 733	29,64%	27,03%
6	October 20, 2007	4 231 970	28,06%	25,96%
7	October 27, 2007	4 210 394	27,90%	26,10%
8	November 3, 2007	4 309 850	28,09%	25,31%
9	November 10, 2007	4 049 478	27,71%	25,92%
10	November 24, 2007	3 853 187	26,41%	24,18%
11	December 1, 2007	4 216 436	28,05%	25,11%
12	December 8, 2007	4 311 673	29,55%	26,22%
13	December 15, 2007	4 758 730	31,66%	29,53%
Average	–			
