= Mateusz Polit =

Polish choreographer (born 1975)

Mateusz Polit (born 17 September 1975 in Kielce) is a Polish director, choreographer, modern dance lecturer, producer of theatre plays, dance and music shows, television programs, multimedia spectacles and gala concerts. He is the founder of an international ensemble Art Project Ballet.

== Education ==
Born in Kielce, Polit is a graduate of Ballet School of Feliks Parnell in Lodz, the Music Academy of Feliks Nowowiejski in Bydgoszcz (Department of Choir Music and Music Education) and Cracow University of Economics. He participated in foreign apprenticeships in Académie de la Danse in Paris, Alvin Ailey's American Dance Theater in New York and took part in Global Vibration workshops in Dance Work School in London.

== Career ==
He started his dance career under the supervision of Andrzej Król. He first appeared at the Kielce Dance Theatre in the play Feelings whose premiere took place in December 1995 on the stage of the Theatre of Stefan Jaracz in Olsztyn. He worked for the Kielce Dance Theatre (solo parts in plays To be or to take), Quo Vadis, For you Lord. He also performed as a musical actor and dancer in productions of the Music Theatre Roma in Warsaw as well as of the Buffo Theatre in Warsaw.

After an injury he got while working on the play Miss Saigon, he started his career as a dance lecturer, director and choreographer. In 2002 he founded an international ballet ensemble Art Project Ballet, gathering dancers, actors and acrobats. He also owns a company Art Project (2006) which deals with the production of artistic events. It produces TV programs, gala concerts as well as film and multimedia materials.

=== Choreography work ===
As a choreographer Mateusz co-operates with Polish and foreign TV stations (TVP, TVN, Polsat, BBC, Rai, Eurosport). He prepared choreography of the National Festival of Polish Song in Opole in 2006 and 2016. What's more, he is the creator of such shows as Miss Poland, as well as New Year's Eve concerts on TVP (2005/2006 and 2007/2008). He is the author of the arrangement of the concert for the Polsat 15th Anniversary, Telecameras gala in 2008, as well as Sopot International Song Festival in years 2008–2010. Moreover, he has taken part in the production of such TV programs as Idol, Gwiazdy tańczą na lodzie (Stars on Ice), Szymon Majewski Show, Top Model, Kocham Cię, Polsko, (I Love You, Poland), Celebrity Splash, Cabarets Live, Jak oni śpiewają (Soapstar Superstar). In 2009 he directed and prepared choreography of the concert Show The Jacksons and Tribute to Michael Jackson. Furthermore, he was also responsible for the arrangement of the opening ceremony at the European Handball Championships 2016.

=== Director’s work ===
He came out in 2003 as a co-director and choreographer of the play Funny Games in the Stara Prochownia Theatre in Warsaw. In 2005 he was commissioned by EBU (European Broadcasting Union) to direct the Eurovision Young Dancers contest.

In 2006 Daniel Libeskind ordered him to create a play Architect’s Dream, which was a dance interpretation of the architect's works. Its premiere took place in Teatr Wielki – National Opera in Warsaw. In 2009 he directed a multimedia modern ballet performance Sins presented in the Syrena Theatre in Warsaw. In 2011 Mateusz Polit got interested in children's matters, which resulted in directing and preparing choreography of a spectacle for the youngest entitled Mechanic Magician’s Shop performed in the Theatre of the Little Spectator in Warsaw. The play, inspired by A Tale of a Steel Hedgehog by Jan Brzechwa, was welcomed by the reviewers.

He also directed a social campaign and a gala for the 10th anniversary of the All of Poland Reads to Kids Foundation as well as the gala of the International Children's Song and Dance Festival in Konin.

In 2016, during the World Youth Day in Cracow, he created a spectacle of the Way of the Cross with the participation of Pope Francis at Cracow Blonia.

Mateusz Polit has taken part in numerous events and artistic projects in Poland and abroad (shows, spectacles, festivals, TV programs, commercials, business galas and many other). He has co-operated with Garou, SNAP, Tom Jones, London Beat, Lou Bega, Boney M., Fun Factory, La Toya Jackson and Shakin' Stevens. In his performances he introduces multimedia animations, elements of computer graphics, black trax systems, aerial stunts, water curtains and Virtual Reality (VR) projects.

== Selected projects ==
2003:

- Funny Games (Stara Prochownia Theatre), co-direction and choreography of the play

2005:

- Eurovision Young Dancers contest – direction of the event for EBU and TVP

2006:

- Architect’s Dream – direction of the spectacle

2007-2008:

- Jak oni śpiewają (Soapstar Superstar) – choreography of the program for TVP

2009:

- Sailing – production and direction of the spectacle for the International Tall Ship Races

2011:

- Four Elements – choreography of an authorial dance show
- Sins – choreography and direction of the play
- Mechanic Magician’s Shop – direction and choreography of the children's play

2013:

- Notes from Silver Screen – directing and production of the opera play in Turkey

2014:

- FIVB Volleyball World Championship 2014 – choreography of the volleyball Mundial's closing ceremony

2015:

- Celebrity Splash – direction of the artistic part of the program's series for Polsat TV

2016:

- International Children's Song and Dance Festival in Konin – direction of the festival gala
- EHF Men's Handball Euro Championship 2016 - direction of the opening ceremony
- World Youth Day – direction of the spectacle of the Way of the Cross
