= Anioł Stróż =

- Genre: Comedy
- Directed by: Filip Zylber
- Starring: Waldemar Barwiński; Rafał Cieszyński; Joanna Trzepiecińska; Jolanta Fraszyńska; Wiktor Zborowski; Zuzanna Madejska; Jan Jędrzejczyk
- Country of origin: Poland
- Original language: Polish
- No. of seasons: 1
- No. of episodes: 13

Production
- Executive producer: Ewa Leja
- Running time: 30 minutes

Original release
- Network: TVN
- Release: September 5 – November 28, 2005

Anioł Stróż (Polish pronunciation: [ˈaɲɔw ˈstruʂ], Guardian Angel) is a Polish television comedy series that premiered on September 5, 2005, on TVN. The series was directed by Filip Zylber. It is broadcast every Monday at 9:30 pm on channel TVN.

== Plot ==
Anna Górska is a new divorcee with two children, Martyna and Kuba. Trying to make ends meet, she decides to return to work, but needs to hire someone to look after the children. Together with her sister Beata, Anna gets the idea to hire someone in exchange for living under their roof.

== Cast ==
Actor	Role
Waldemar Barwiński	Gabriel
Rafał Cieszyński	Eryk
Joanna Trzepiecińska	Anna Górska
Jolanta Fraszyńska	Beata
Wiktor Zborowski	Saint Piotr
Zuzanna Madejska	Martyna Górska
Jan Jędrzejczyk	Kuba Górski
The Holy Ghost	God
