= Jolanta Fraszyńska =

Polish actress (born 1968)

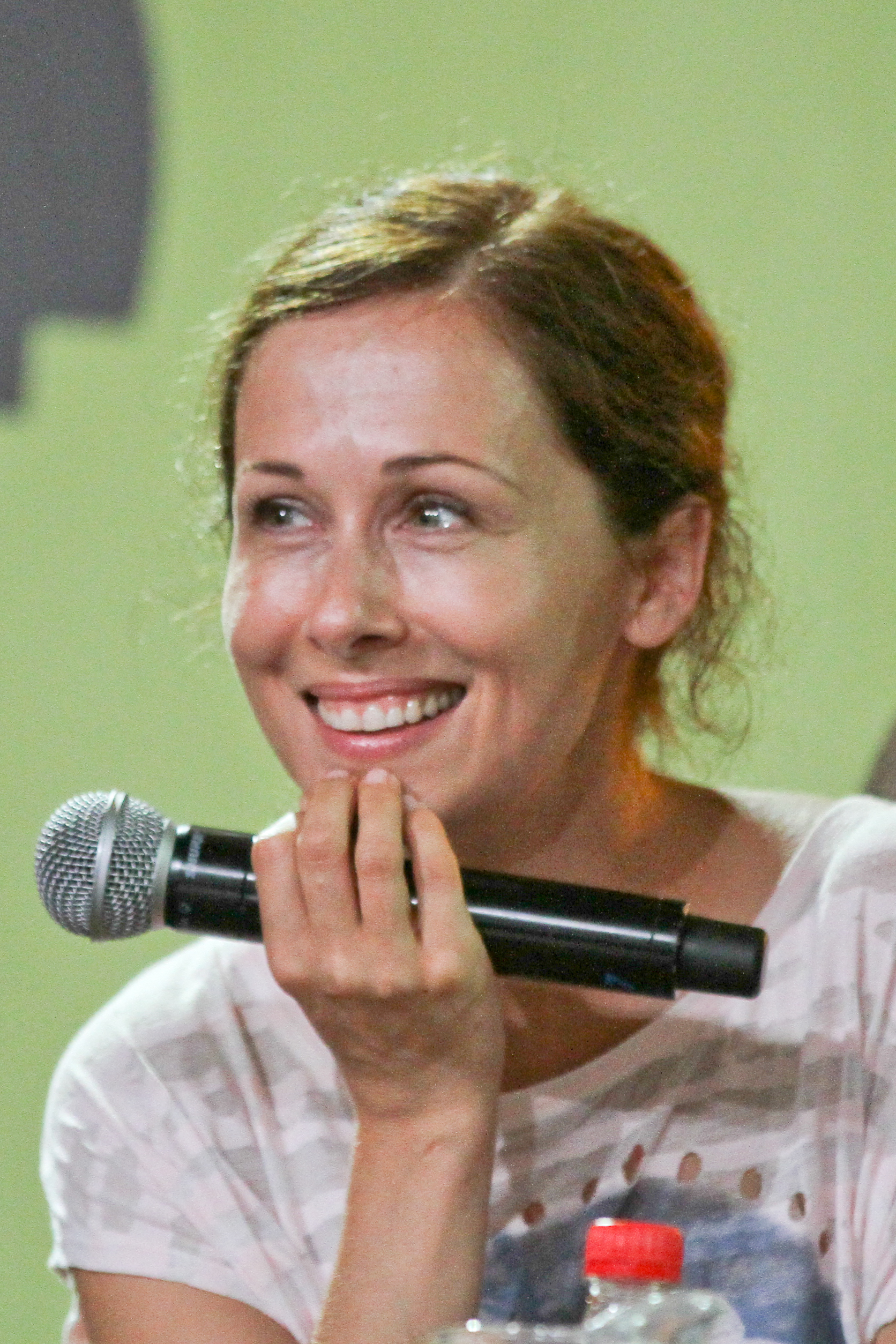
- Jolanta Fraszyńska (2014)
- Born: 14 December 1968 (age 57); Mysłowice
- Spouse(s): Robert Gonera (divorced); Grzegorz Kuczeriszka (divorced)
- Website: http://www.fraszynska.pl/

Jolanta Fraszyńska (born 14 December 1968 in Mysłowice) is a Polish actress in film and theater.

== Biography ==
Fraszyńska spent her childhood in Mysłowice, Poland. As a six year old she began performing in the singing and dancing program of the local cultural center WSS "Społem", and later in the church-affiliated arts organization Oaza. She matriculated at the State Higher Theater School in Wrocław (wrocławska Państwowa Wyższa Szkoła Teatralna) upon completing her studies at the pre-school academy Studium Wychowania Przedszkolnego. In 1990 she completed further schooling in Kraków at the Państwowa Szkoła Teatralna im. Ludwika Solskiego. During 1991–1998 she worked as actress in the theater Teatr Polski in Wrocław. In 1998 she moved to Warsaw at the leading Teatr Dramatyczny. She took part in twenty-five productions of the television-broadcast Teatr Telewizji.

She debuted in cinematic work in 1991, playing Ania in In flagranti, a film by Wojciech Biedroń.

From 6 September 2008 she had participated in the 4th edition of the television program Jak oni śpiewają, but 28 September 2008 she was forced to cancel owing to health problems, ultimately taking 13th place in the overall competition. In 2011 she joined the jury panel of the 13th edition of Polish Dancing with the Stars (Taniec z gwiazdami), thereby replacing actress Beata Tyszkiewicz.

== Private life ==
Fraszyńska has two daughters: Nastazja (born 1990), from her first marriage with fellow actor Robert Gonera and Aniela (born 12 May 2004), with her second husband Grzegorz Kuczeriszka, a film cameraman, whom she divorced in the spring of 2010.

For two years she was an ambassador for a social charity campaign Ogólnopolska Kampania Społeczna Forum Against Depression.

Jolanta Fraszyńska decided to participate in a Playboy Polska pictorial, featured in the May 1999 issue. She has also authored one of the fables in the anthology Bajki gwiazd (2005), available in print and as a recording.

== Filmography ==
=== Film roles ===
- 1986: Budniokowie i inni
- 1989: Szklany dom – ciężarna córka mieszkanki kamienicy
- 1989: Powroty
- 1991: In flagranti – Ania, studentka doktora Nowaka
- 1992: Białe małżeństwo – Bianka
- 1992: Żegnaj Rockefeller – Julia Kuczmańska, dziewczyna Michała
- 1992: Enak – dziewczyna z komitetu wyborczego
- 1993: Wow (installments 12 and 13)
- 1993: Pora na czarownice – Jola Markowska
- 1993: Łowca. Ostatnie starcie – psycholog Tereska, przyjaciółka Parviny
- 1993: Goodbye Rockefeller – Julia Kuczmańska, dziewczyna Michała
- 1995: Prowokator – urzędniczka na poczcie
- 1996: Maszyna zmian. Nowe przygody – Ewa (installment 1)
- 1997: Królowa złodziei – Francoise
- 1997: Wojenna narzeczona – Ania, kelnerka w restauracji Dąbrowskiego (odc. 3 i 4)
- 1997: Boża podszewka – Elżutka Jurewicz, siostra Marysi
- 1998: Ekstradycja 3 – haker Ćma
- 1998: Sto minut wakacji – Danuta Milley
- 1999: Sto minut wakacji – Danuta Milley
- 1999: Kiler-ów 2-óch – Aldona Lipska
- 1999–2010: Na dobre i na złe – Monika Zybert-Jędras
- 1999: Ja, Malinowski – Eliza
- 2000: Dom – Jola, córka Ekstra-mocnego (odc. 24 i 25)
- 2001: Zostać miss – Katarzyna Wolska, reporterka radia „Stolica”
- 2001: Domek dla Julii – Julia
- 2001: Pieniądze to nie wszystko – Małgosia, sekretarka Turkota
- 2001: Cisza – przyjaciółka Mimi
- 2001: Kocham Klarę – aktorka Jola Kapuścińska (odc. 13)
- 2003: Zróbmy sobie wnuka – sprzedawczyni
- 2004: Ławeczka – Kasia
- 2005: Skazany na bluesa – Małgorzata „Gola” Riedel, żona Ryśka
- 2005: Pitbull – żona tirowca (odc. 4)
- 2005: Anioł Stróż – Beata, siostra Anny
- 2008: Niania – Sandra (odc. 109)
- 2008: Hotel pod żyrafą i nosorożcem – Anna Miłobędzka
- 2010–2011: Licencja na wychowanie – Roma Barańska
- 2012: Hotel 52 – Grażyna Jabłońska (odc. 54)
- 2012: Ja to mam szczęście – Wanda (odc. 34)
- 2012: Sęp – sędzia
- 2015: M jak miłość – Zuzanna Marszałek
- 2015: Ojciec Mateusz – laborantka Agnieszka Murawska (odc. 171)

=== Polish-language dubbing roles ===
- 2009: Esterhazy – mother of Polish family
- 2007: Mr. Magorium's Wonder Emporium – Molly Mahoney
- 2005: Hoodwinked – Red Riding Hood
- 2000: The Road to El Dorado – Chel
- 1998: Rudolph the Red-Nosed Reindeer: The Movie – Zoey
- 1998: Mulan – Fa Mulan
- 1995: Grający z talerza – Janka
- 2013: Wreck-It Ralph – Vanellope von Schweetz
- 2018: Ralph Breaks the Internet – Vanellope von Schweetz, Fa Mulan

== Selected theater roles ==
- 1991: Nasze miasto, thesis performance – Emilka
- 1991: Ania z Zielonego wzgórza by Lucy Maud Montgomery – Ania
- 1992: Pułapka by Tadeusz Różewicz
- 1992: Płatonow by Anton Czechov – Sasza
- 1993: Płatonow – akt pominięty by Anton Czechov – Sasza
- 1994: Romeo i Julia – Julia
- 1997: Hedda Gabler by Henrik Ibsen – Pani Elvsted
- 1998: Niezidentyfikowane szczątki ludzkie by Brad Fraser – Jerri
- 1999: Opera żebracza by Václav Havel – Jeny
- 1999: Hamlet – Guildenstern
- 1999: Powrót Odysa by Stanisław Wyspiański
- 2001: Wymazywanie by Thomas Bernhard
- 2008: Ucho Van Gogha Fred Apka – She
- 2010: Fredro dla dorosłych mężów i żon by Aleksander Fredro

=== Television theater ===
- 1992: Obcy bliscy by Gundmundur Steinsson – Marta
- 1992: Roberto Zucco – Little girl
- 1993: Gyubal Wahazar – Świntusia Macabrescu
- 1999: Dybuk – Gitel
- 2006: Umarli ze Spoon River – Dora Williams
