= 2XL (TV series) =

- Genre: Drama
- Directed by: Bodo Kox
- Starring: Edyta Jungowska; Elżbieta Romanowska; Przemysław Sadowski; Ewa Kaim; Piotr Stramowski
- Country of origin: Poland
- Original language: Polish
- No. of seasons: 1
- No. of episodes: 13

Production
- Running time: 44 minutes
- Production company: Akson Studio

Original release
- Network: Polsat
- Release: 5 September – 28 November 2013

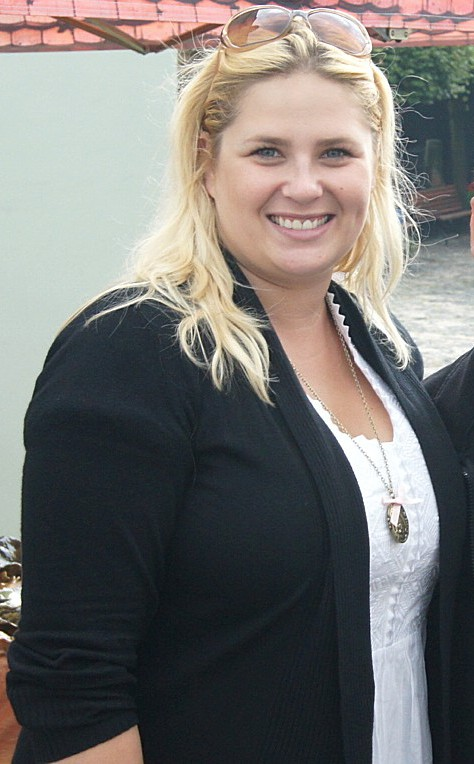
Romanowska Elżbieta

2XL is a Polish drama television series, broadcast on Polsat in 2013.

== Plot ==
Agata Dec is a professional biologist, she is successful at her job, but she has a lot of self-esteem problems associated with obesity. She eats only salads and drinks a lot of coffee, which leads to frequent fainting. Finally, she goes to the hospital, where a doctor advises her to contact a dietitian. That leads her to meeting Laura Zabawska who is also struggling with being overweight. As a result of problems in her marriage, she seeks solace in chocolates. Both ladies soon became good friends.

== Cast ==
Actor	Role
Edyta Jungowska	Laura Zabawska
Elżbieta Romanowska	Agata Dec
Ewa Kaim	Bożena, Agata's friend
Marek Kaliszuk	Jurek, Agata's friend
Przemysław Sadowski	Karol, Laura's husband
Natalia Klimas	Ola Bielewicz, Laura's sister
Filip Bobek	Albert Bielewicz
Piotr Rogucki	Alek, Agata's co-worker
Bartłomiej Nowosielski	Igor, Agata's co-worker
Piotr Polk	Agata's boss
Piotr Stramowski	Robert, Agata's co-worker
