= Edyta Jungowska =

Polish actress (born 1966)

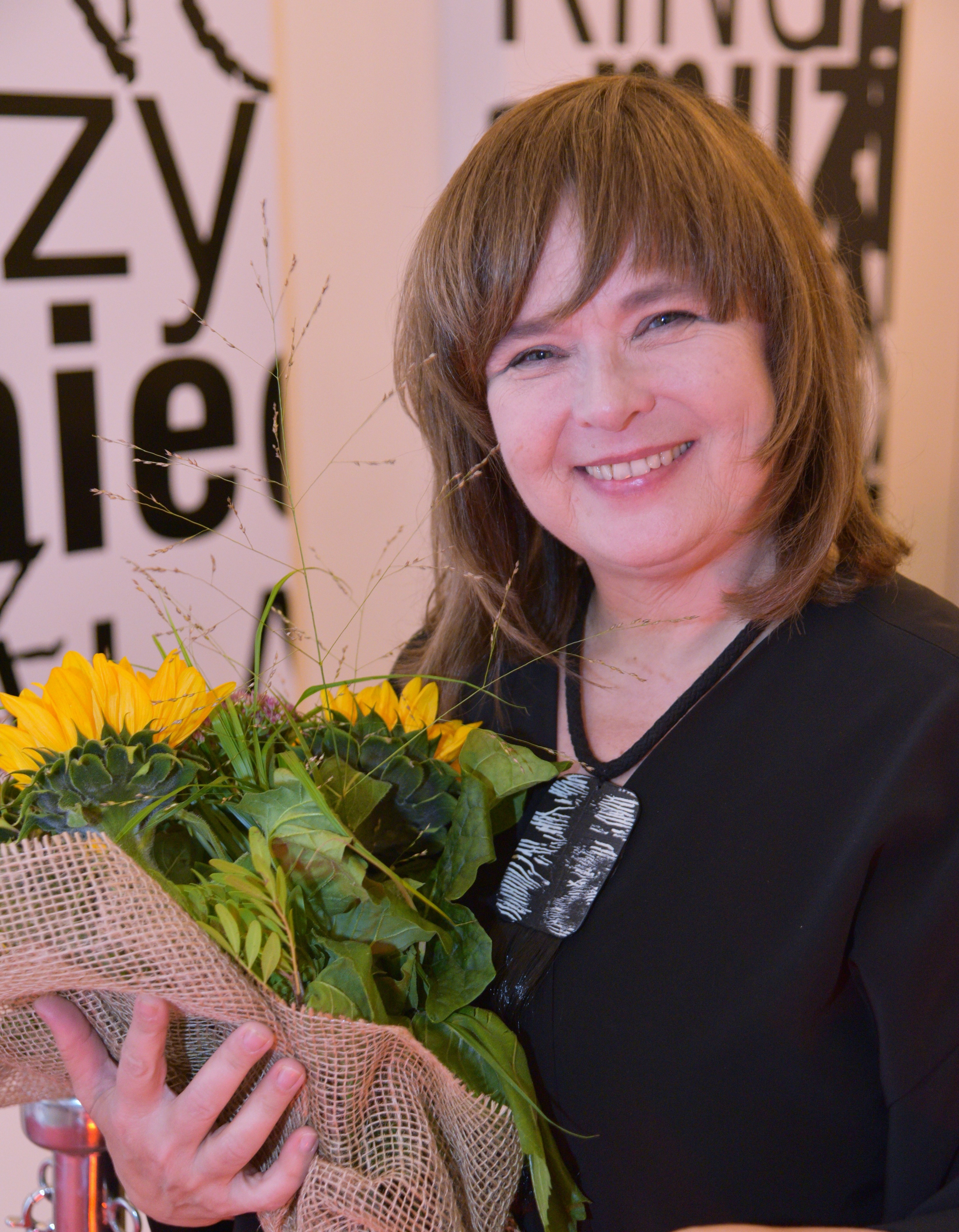
- Edyta Jungowska
- Born: 1 February 1966 (age 60); Warsaw, Poland
- Occupation: Actress
- Years active: 1984–present

Edyta Jungowska (born 1 February 1966 in Warsaw, Poland) is a Polish theater, film and television actress.

== Career ==
She is graduated from Aleksander Zelwerowicz State Theatre Academy in Warsaw (1989). The first theatrical success was with the role of Miss Maliczewska in spectacle Zapolska, Zapolska directed by Adam Hanuszkiewicz in 1990.

In television, she debuted with the role of Constanze Mozart in Peter Shaffer's drama Amadeus directed by Maciej Wojtyszko. She has to her credit nearly 30 roles in theatrical TV. In 1995 she first appeared in the TV show Kabaret Olgi Lipińskiej, where she worked until the year 2000. She has gained wide popularity for her role as Bożena Van Graaf in Polish TV series Na dobre i na złe (For better and for worse).

== Selected filmography ==
=== Actress ===
- 1984: Szaleństwa panny Ewy as Julka, Ewa's fellow
- 1999–2012: Na dobre i na złe (For better and for worse) as Bożena Van Graaf
- 1999: Badziewiakowie as Halina Badziewiakowa
- 2004: Cudownie ocalony as Hanka
- 2007: Ja wam pokażę! as Judyta
- 2010–2013: Klan (Clan) as Małgorzata Antoniak
- 2013: 2XL as Laura Zabawska
- 2019: Ojciec Mateusz as Alicja Witko (one episode)
- 2022: Detektyw Bruno as ciocia
- 2025: Oskar, Patka i złoto Bałtyku as ciocia

=== Dubbing in Polish ===
- 1981–1990: The Smurfs – Nat
- 1993–1998: Animaniacs – Dot Warner
- 1995: Toy Story – Bou
- 1998–2004: The Powerpuff Girls – Buttercup
- 1999: Toy Story 2 – Bou
- 2001–2003: Braceface – Maria Wong
- 2007: Casper's Scare School – Casper
