= Chris Cowey =

British television producer

Chris Cowey (born c. 1961 in Sunderland) is an English television producer specialising in music shows. He is best known for producing Top of the Pops from 1997 until 2003.

Cowey co-presented the Tyne Tees television pop show All Right Now and spent several years as a DJ at Sunderland Mayfair (Mecca) in the late 1970s. He also produced the Channel 4 music show The White Room between 1995 and 1996 and worked on The Tube in Newcastle in the 1980s. He co-presented Check It Out 1979 to 1982 and was one of the interviewers of the notorious appearance of John Lydon (Johnny Rotten) when he walked off set, leaving Cowey shaken.

He became one of the judges on the ITV1 reality show Soapstar Superstar in 2006 and reprised this role in 2007.

He is a supporter of Sunderland A.F.C.
