= Aleksandra Szwed =

Polish actress and singer (born 1990)

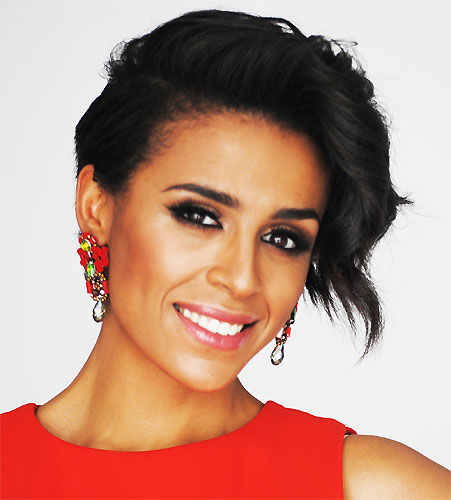
- Szwed in 2016
- Born: 8 August 1990 (age 36); Warsaw, Poland
- Education: SWPS University
- Occupations: Actress; television presenter; singer; model
- Years active: 1999–present

Aleksandra Szwed (Polish: [a.lɛkˈsan.dra ˈʂfɛt]; born 8 August 1990) is a Polish actress, television presenter, and singer. She is best known for starring as Eliza in the Polsat sitcom television series Foster Family. She also portrayed Liliana Górecka in Barwy szczęścia (2013–2017), Patrycja Blechacz in Leśniczówka (2018–2021), Magda Rosiak in Na Wspólnej (2021–2023), Melisa in First Love (2022–2026), and Kalina Skrzywińska in Pawned & Perilous (2023–2026). Szwed also stares as Kalina Skrzywińska in the TV Puls drama series Pawned & Perilous (2023–2026). Additionally, she appeared in the feature films Fighter (2019), Raz, jeszcze raz (2019), and Wheel of Love (2023). Szwed also hosted the Polsat reality show Ekipa na swoim in 2013, and the Polsat game show Ninja Warrior Polska in 2019, and was one of the jurors in the Polsat talent show Śpiewajmy razem. All Together Now. Furthermore, she recorded singles "Ach Ten Pan!" (2013), "For Once in My Life" (2015), "I Won't Give Up" (2016), and "Ty coś w sobie masz" (2016). Szwed is also a model and fashion designer.

== Early life and education ==
Aleksandra Szwed was born on 8 August 1990, in Warsaw, Poland. Her mother is of Polish descent, and her father of Nigerian descent. When she was one-year-old, her father left her family. She grew up with her mother and step-father in Warsaw.

In 2014, Szwed graduated from the SWPS University in Warsaw, with a master's degree in cultural studies.

== Career ==
As a child, Szwed was a member of the performing group with singer Majka Jeżowska. In 1995 and 1996, she appeared in the TVP1 children's entertainment show Ziarno, and from 1997 to 1998, in children's and youth entertainment show 5-10-15. Szwed also performed with children's theatrical troupes, including with Tintilo at the Rampa Theatre in Warsaw, and later with Teatrzyk Lustereczko at the Ochota Youth Cultural Center in Warsaw.

From 1999 to 2009, Szwed portrayed Eliza, one of the main characters in the Polsat sitcom television series Foster Family. She also had minor roles in television series such as Niania (2008), Off the Stretcher (2008), Teraz albo nigdy! (2009), The Ranch (2012), Na krawędzi (2013), Family.pl (2016), and Father Matthew (2018). Szwed also had several major recurring roles in television series, including Liliana Górecka in Barwy szczęścia (2013–2017), Patrycja Blechacz in Leśniczówka (2018–2021), Magda Rosiak in Na Wspólnej (2021–2023), Melisa in First Love (2022–2026). She also stars as Kalina Skrzywińska in the TV Puls drama series Pawned & Perilous (2023–2026). Szwed also appeared in the feature films Fighter (2019), Raz, jeszcze raz (2019), and Wheel of Love (2023). Furthermore, she is also a stage actress, having performed at venues such as the Capitol Theatre in Warsaw, Och-Teatr in Warsaw, the Polonia Theatre in Warsaw, and the Wrocław Polish Theatre. Additionally, she voiced characters in the Polish-language dubbing versions of video games Until Dawn (2015), Battlefield 1 (2016), Star Wars Battlefront II (2017), and Torment: Tides of Numenera (2017).

In 2008, together with dancer Sławomir Borowiecki, Szwed in the TVP2 talent show Gwiazdy tańczą na lodzie. She also participated in the Polsat talent show Jak oni śpiewają, and the TVP2 game show Fort Boyard. In 2010, Szwed participated in the Polsat talent show Dancing with the Stars. Taniec z gwiazdami. She hosted the reality shows Operacja: Stylówa in 2012, and Ekipa na swoim in 2013. In 2016, and later again in 2024, Szwed competed and won on the Polsat talent show Twoja twarz brzmi znajomo. She was one of the jurors in the Polsat talent show Śpiewajmy razem. All Together Now in 2018 and 2019, and a host of the Polsat game show Ninja Warrior Polska in 2019. In 2020, Szwed participated in the TVP2 talent show Star Voice. Gwiazdy mają głos.

In 2004, Szwed recorded songs for the Polish-language dubbing of the Nickelodeon action adventure animated series Winx Club. They were later released on the album Winx na koncercie in 2009. In 2009, Szwed took part in the Polish pre-selections to the Eurovision Song Contest, in which she performed song "All My Life" in a duet with Marco Bocchino. She also recorded singles "Ach Ten Pan!" (2013), "For Once in My Life" (2015), "I Won't Give Up" (2016), and "Ty coś w sobie masz" (2016). Szwed also regularly performed vocally on the TVP1 game show Jaka to melodia?.

She is also a model, fashion designer, and master of ceremonies.

== Personal life ==
Szwed has two children together with basketball player Krzysztof Białkowski, a son born in 2015, and a daughter born in 2021. She resides in Warsaw, Poland.

She was brought up in the Roman Catholic faith, and she declares herself as a non-denominational Christian.

== Filmography ==
=== Film ===
Year	Title	Role	Notes	Ref.
2012	Dead Children	Gosia	Short film	
2012	Panienki z Park Avenue	Ewa	Short film	
2019	Fighter	Agata	Feature film	
2019	Raz, jeszcze raz	Ewelina	Feature film	
2023	Wheel of Love	Airport hostess	Feature film	

=== Television series ===
Year	Title	Role	Notes	Ref.
1999–2009	Foster Family	Eliza	Main role; 306 episodes	
2008	Niania	Zoya	Episode: "Zoya, córka Frani"	
2008	Off the Stretcher	Tola Wajdor	Episode: "Materiał na panią doktor"	
2009	Teraz albo nigdy!	Franka Drabczyk	12 episodes	
2012	The Ranch	Marysia	Episode: "Tchnienie Las Vegas"	
2013	Na krawędzi	Bayo Akijame	4 episodes	
2013–2017	Barwy szczęścia	Liliana Górecka	Recurring role; 50 episodes	
2016	Family.pl	Aleksandra Wielopolska	Episode: "Boskie życie"	
2018	Father Matthew	Monika Lineker	Episode: "Tajemnica chemika"	
2018–2021	Leśniczówka	Patrycja Blechacz	Main role; 48 episodes	
2019	Miłość na zakręcie	Ewa	Recurring role; 28 episodes	
2021	Sexify	Expo presenter	Episode no. 4	
2021	Komisarz Mama	Emilia	Episode no. 6	
2021	Ekler	Sister Bonfilia	Web series; 4 episodes	
2021–2023	Na Wspólnej	Magda Rosiak	Recurring role; 24 episodes	
2022–2026	First Love	Melisa	Recurring role; 64 episodes	
2023–2026	Pawned & Perilous	Kalina Skrzywińska	Main role	

=== Television programmes ===
Year	Title	Role	Notes	Ref.
1995–1996	Ziarno	Herself	Entertainment show	
1997–1999	5-10-15	Herself	Entertainment show	
2006	Rozmowy w toku	Herself (guest)	Talk show; episode aired 23 January 2006	
2008	Gwiazdy tańczą na lodzie	Herself (contestant)	Talent show; 12 episodes	
2008	Fort Boyard	Herself (contestant)	Game show; 2 episodes	
2008–2009	Jak oni śpiewają	Herself (contestant)	Talent show; 14 episodes	
2009	Kuba Wojewódzki	Herself (guest)	Talk show; episode aired 3 March 2009	
2009	Szymon Majewski Show	Herself (guest)	Reality show; episode aired 12 October 2009	
2010	Dancing with the Stars. Taniec z gwiazdami	Herself (contestant)	Talent show; 4 episodes	
2010	Królowie Densfloru	Herself (contestant)	Talent show; 6 episodes	
2012	Operacja: Stylówa	Herself (host)	Reality show; 17 episodes	
2013	Ekipa na swoim	Herself (host)	Reality show; 9 episodes	
2015	Mamy cię!	Herself (guest)	Reality show; episode aired 19 April 2015	
2016, 2024	Twoja twarz brzmi znajomo	Herself (contestant)	Talent show; 20 episodes	
2018	Big Music Quiz	Herself (contestant)	Game show; episode aired 25 March 2018	
2018–2026	Jaka to melodia?	Herself (guest singer)	Game show	
2018–2019	Śpiewajmy razem. All Together Now	Herself (juror)	Talent show; 15 episodes	
2019	Ninja Warrior Polska	Herself (host)	Game show; 7 episodes	
2020	Star Voice. Gwiazdy mają głos	Herself (contestant)	Talent show; 3 episodes	
2020	Anything Goes. Ale Jazda	Herself (contestant)	Game show; episode aired 2 October 2020	
2023	LOL: Kto się śmieje ostatni	Herself	Game show; 2 episodes	
2025	Magda gotuje Internet	Herself (guest)	Talk show; episode aired 5 January 2025	
2025	Złote czasy telewizji	Herself (guest)	Talk show	

=== Polish-language dubbing ===
Year	Title	Role	Notes	Ref.
2004	Winx Club	Musical performance	Television series	
2015	Until Dawn	Emily Davis	Video game	
2016	Battlefield 1	Zara Ghufran	Video game	
2017	Star Wars Battlefront II	Iden Versio	Video game	
2017	Torment: Tides of Numenera	Matkina	Video game	

=== Audio plays ===
Year	Title	Role	Notes	Ref.
2021	Biały ląd	Elodie Kinyama		
2022	Wymazane archiwum. Zła woda			

=== Audiobooks ===
Year	Title	Author	Publisher	ISBN	Ref.
2019	Dzikie Dziecko Miłości	Aneta Jadowska	SQN	9788381295659	
2021	Gwałt	Joanna Chmielewska	Storyside	9789152150382	

== Theatre credits ==
Year	Title	Role	Venue	Director	Ref.
2003	Eutedemis, czyli po drugiej stronie lustra	Eutedemis	Ochota Youth Cultural Center (Warsaw, Poland)	No data	
2003	O dobry dzień	No data	Rampa Theatre (Warsaw, Poland)	No data	
2006	Panna	Miss	Ochota Youth Cultural Center, Warsaw	No data	
2006	Jaś i Małgosia	Gretel	Ochota Youth Cultural Center (Warsaw, Poland)	No data	
2010	Antoine	Josephine Baker	Polonia Theatre (Warsaw, Poland)	Jakub Przebindowski	
2010	Antoine	Francis	Polonia Theatre (Warsaw, Poland)	Jakub Przebindowski	
2010	Antoine	Ivett	Polonia Theatre (Warsaw, Poland)	Jakub Przebindowski	
2012	Dwie połówki pomarańczy	Alex	Capitol Theatre (Warsaw, Poland)	Maria Ciunelis	
2013	Siostrunie	Sister Mary Leo	Ale! Teatr (Warsaw, Poland)	Mariusz Kiljan	
2016	Przepraszam, co pan tu robi?	Maria	Wrocław Polish Theatre (Wrocław, Poland)	Arkadiusz Grochot	
2017	Alibi od zaraz	Julie	Capitol Theatre (Warsaw, Poland)	Marcin Sławiński	
2023	Okno na parlament	Italian maid	Och-Theatre (Warsaw, Poland)	Krystyna Janda	
2024	Łóżko pełne cudzoziemców	Brenda	Capitol Theatre, Warsaw	Jerzy Bończak	
2024	Szalone nożyczki, czyli kto zabił?	Barbara	PrisMedia (Warsaw, Poland)	Rafał Szumski	

== Discography ==
=== Albums ===
Title	Details	Peak chart positions	Certifications	Ref.
Winx na koncercie (with Katarzyna Łaska and Katarzyna Owczarz)	Released: 2 January 2009; Label: Sony BMG; Formats: DVD	—N/a	—N/a	

=== Singles ===
Title	Year	Peak positions	Certifications	Album	Ref.
"All My Life" (with Marek Bocchin)	2009	—N/a	—N/a	—N/a	
"Ach Ten Pan!"	2013	—N/a	—N/a	—N/a	
"For Once in My Life" (with Vintage Vegas)	2015	—N/a	—N/a	—N/a	
"Last Christmas" (cover of the song by Wham!)	2015	—N/a	—N/a	—N/a	
"I Won't Give Up"	2016	—N/a	—N/a	—N/a	
"Powiedz, że nie kochasz" (cover of "99 Luftballons" by Nena)	2016	—N/a	—N/a	—N/a	
"Ty coś w sobie masz"	2016	—N/a	—N/a	—N/a	
