= Check It Out (British TV series) =

- Genre: Youth-oriented magazine; rock music; social issues
- Presented by: Chris Cowey
- Country of origin: United Kingdom
- Original language: English
- No. of series: 3

Production
- Producer: Tyne Tees Television
- Production company: Tyne Tees Television

Original release
- Network: ITV
- Release: 1979 – 1982

Check it Out is a youth-oriented television series produced twice weekly by Tyne Tees Television for ITV from 1979 to 1982. It presented a mix of rock music performances and segments dealing with social issues including homelessness and homosexuality.

Check it Out was produced concurrently with Tyne Tees' new music series Alright Now, from 1979 to 1980.

The show was notorious for an appearance by the band Public Image Ltd, in which John Lydon became angry at the interviewer's questions and walked out of the studio. It was co-presented by future Top of the Pops producer Chris Cowey.
