= Karolina Nowakowska =

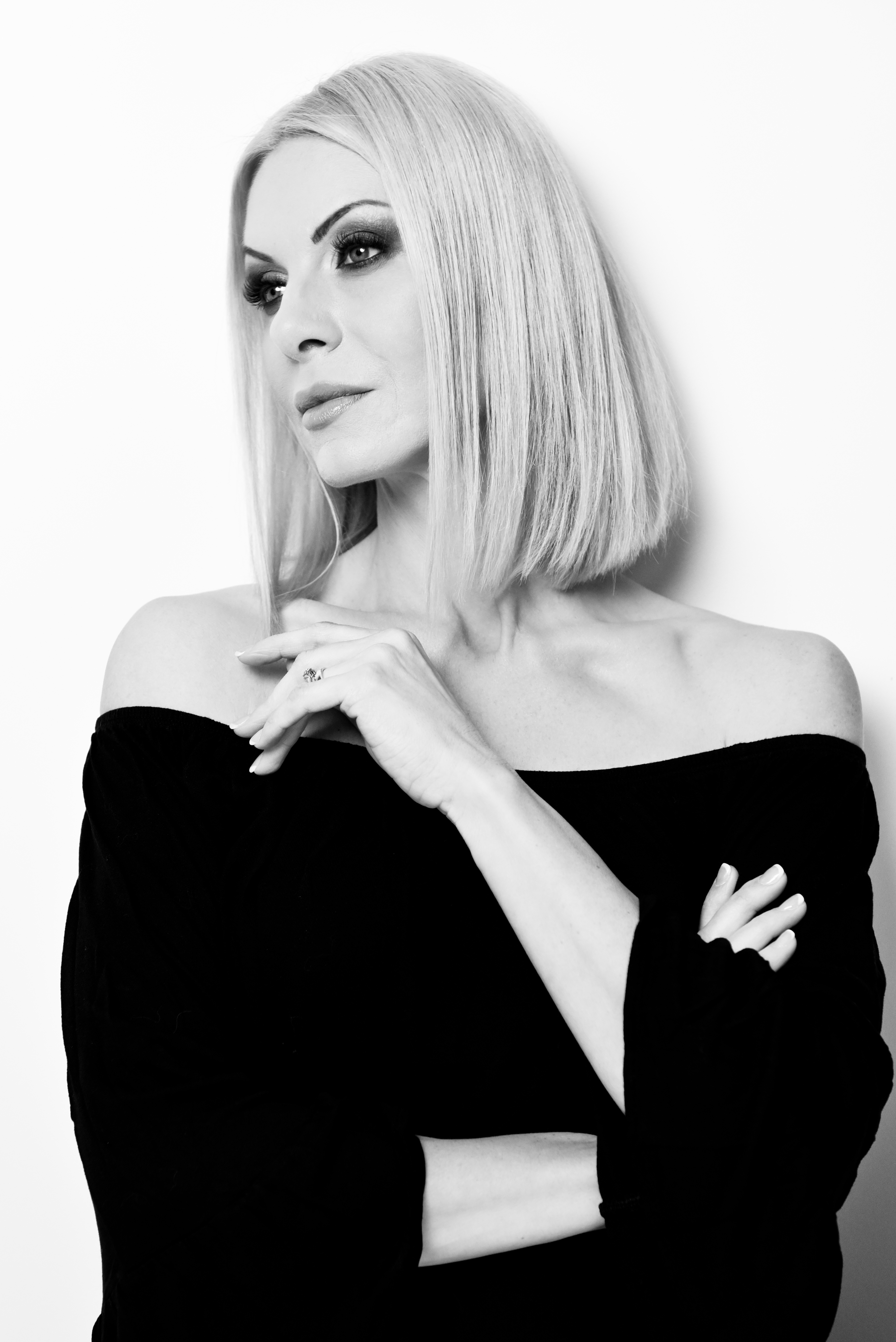

Background information
- Birth name: Karolina Nowakowska
- Born: 17 May 1982 (age 43)
- Origin: POL Warsaw, Poland
- Genres: pop
- Occupation(s): actress, singer
- Years active: 1993 - present

Karolina Nowakowska (born 17 May 1982 in Warsaw) is a Polish actress, dancer and vocalist. Known primarily with the role of Olga in the M jak miłość. She played among others in the city law, Pitbull 2, Na wspólnej, Kryminalni. She is a graduate of the Higher School of Journalism M. Wankowicz and music school. Then she studied acting in school at Warsaw's Jewish Theater. Carolina as a dancer in step won, among others Champion of the Czech Republic (1996), the Champion of Poland (1999) and the Polish Cup (2001). From 7 March to 25 April took part in the second edition of the Stars dancing on ice. Her partner was Filip Bernadowski. Dropped out in the 7th section, covering 6 place. From 6 September to 6 December 2008, she participated in the fourth edition of the program Jak oni śpiewają(Soapstar Superstar), taking second place.

== Filmography ==
- Mięso (Ironica) (1993) as dziewczynka w stroju komunijnym
- Decyzja należy do ciebie (1999) as Anielka
- Policjanci (1999) as Bożenka
- To my (2000) as herself
- Kariera Nikosia Dyzmy (2002)
- Kasia i Tomek (2002–2003) as Uczestniczka prezentacji kosmetyków
- Samo Życie (2002–2008) as Joasia, recepcjonista w redakcji gazety 'Samo Życie'
- Lokatorzy (2003) as panna młoda, klientka restauracji Jacka
- Na Wspólnej (2003–2008) as a wife of Damian
- Zostać miss 2 (2003) as Magda "Komandoska"
- Dziki (2004)
- Kryminalni (2004–2008) as Barmanka/Sabina, żona Łukasza Czecha
- Klinika samotnych serc (2005) as Gabi, modelka
- Pogromczynie mitów (2005) as Ankietowana
- Pitbull (2005–2008) as Prosecutor
- M jak Miłość (2007–2008) as Olga Jankowska, girlfriend of Kuba
- Prawo miasta (2007) as recepcjonistka w firmie Woytowicza

== Teatr TV ==
- Portret słabego pianisty (1994) as Ola
- Blues (1999) as Girl

== Polish dubbing ==
- Szóstka w pracy (2004)
- Battle B-Daman (2005) as Karat
