= Ja, Malinowski =

- Genre: Comedy
- Written by: Stefan Friedmann
- Directed by: Filip Zylber
- Starring: Grzegorz Warchoł; Edyta Olszówka; Olaf Lubaszenko
- Composer: Kuba Sienkiewicz
- Country of origin: Poland
- Original language: Polish
- No. of seasons: 1
- No. of episodes: 16

Production
- Producer: Dariusz Pietrykowski
- Editor: Katarzyna Rudnik
- Camera setup: Fullscreen
- Running time: 24–29 minutes
- Production company: ITI Film Studio

Original release
- Network: TVN
- Release: 4 September – 24 October 1999

Ja, Malinowski (Polish: [ˈja ma.liˈnɔf.ski]; lit. 'I, Malinowski') is a Polish-language comedy television series, directed by Filip Zylber, written by Stefan Friedmann, and produced by Dariusz Pietrykowski. It was distributed by TVN with its episodes airing from 4 September 1999 to 24 October 1999. The show had 16 episodes.

== Plot ==
Roman Malinowski and Laura Malinowska are a married couple that emigrated from Poland during the communist era to Chicago, Illinois, United States, to better their economic situation. There, they had two twin boys Dave and Antek. In the 1990s, Roman won 7.5 million United States dollars. As such, the family decided to return to Poland, where they begin living luxurious lives with their newly acquired wealth.

== Cast ==
- Grzegorz Warchoł as Roman Malinowski
- Edyta Olszówka as Laura Malinowska
- Olaf Lubaszenko as Koryl
- Piotr Adamczyk as Pijaszewski
- Tomasz Sapryk as Miruś
- Jolanta Fraszyńska as Eliza
- Patryk Jezierski as Jezior
- Alan Andersz as Dave
- Mateusz Maksiak as Antek
- Piotr Machalica as Artur Oziębło
- Ewa Błaszczyk as Patrycja Oziębło

== Production ==
Ja, Malinowski was directed by Filip Zylber, written by Stefan Friedmann, and produced by Dariusz Pietrykowski. The music was done by Piotr Mikołajczak and Zbigniew Stelmasiak, and music by Kuba Sienkiewicz, and editing by Katarzyna Rudnik. The show was produced ITI Film Studio, and distributed by TVN. Its first episode aired on 4 September 1999, and its final episode, on 24 October 1999. The show had one season, consisting of 16 episodes, each lasting from 24 to 29 minutes.

== List of episodes ==
- "Szatoróż"
- "Przeprowadzka"
- "Zwyczajny dzień"
- "Ręce do pracy"
- "Wuj Teofil"
- "Ziemia wysypana"
- "Odwiedziny rodziny"
- "Rajska wyspa"
- "Maraton z uśmiechem"
- "Wieczór kawalerski"
- "Człowiek z gazety"
- "Nie przeminęło z wiatrem"
- "Firma budowlana 'Logo'"
- "Koryl się żeni"
- "Awaria"
- "Koniec z nami"
