= Billy Sammeth =

American television producer and agent

Billy Sammeth (December 3, 1951 – June 18, 2018) was an American talent manager, writer, and television producer and personality.

== Early life ==
Billy Sammeth was born December 3, 1951, in Brooklyn, New York. At the age of twelve, he moved with his family to California, where Sammeth's father, Philip, was an executive at Walt Disney Productions, pioneering the character merchandising division (licensing the Davy Crockett Coonskin Cap to then unknown toy company, Mattel).

== Career ==
=== Management ===
In 1969, only a week after beginning college in Columbus, Ohio, Sammeth sustained a brain concussion from a horseback riding injury and was sent home to his parents in California on a medical leave of absence. His father soon arranged a job for him in the mail room of a public relations firm in Hollywood that represented many celebrity personalities including The Osmond Brothers. Sammeth and the Osmond Brothers became fast friends and Sammeth continued to work with the Osmond Brothers as their public relations representative even while attending school.

Sammeth dropped out of college in 1971 and began work at MGM records for Mike Curb. Soon after, Osmondmania became a worldwide phenomena, and at the age of 21, he was credited with launching the Osmondmania craze in teenage publications throughout the world. writing weekly articles under Donny's name, making all traveling arrangements, touring with the Osmonds and overseeing the licensing of everything from Osmond lunch boxes, pillow cases, bubble gum and Halloween costumes.

In 1973, Sammeth joined the highly respected Katz-Gallin Enterprises, Personal Management Firm that not only represented the Osmonds, but many of the biggest names in Hollywood. He eventually began managing the careers of Joan Rivers, Cher, Olivia Newton-John, Lily Tomlin, Dolly Parton, and many others. He soon became the scale show booker for Katz-Gallin, booking clients on shows such as Hollywood Squares, The Merv Griffin Show, the Mike Douglas Show, Dinah!, and The Tonight Show.

In 1983, Sammeth left Katz-Gallin and set up his own agency, The Bill Sammeth Organization, which is still in existence. His first clients were Cher, Joan Rivers, Olivia Newton-John and KC and the Sunshine Band.

=== Television and Writing ===
Sammeth appeared on ITV’s Soapstar Superstar with Cilla Black, where he was referred to as the "American Simon Cowell", and his no holds barred commentary led him to be known as “that over the top, over opinionated American Manager” in the English dailies. On Sammeth’s very first show, he took exception to contestant Wendy Peters wardrobe, and advised her to accentuate the positive and to cover up the negative, “like your arms”, which led to immediate press for the show and Sammeth. For the second season, the judging team consisted of Sammeth, Martine McCutcheon, and Michael Ball.

Sammeth also wrote for The Late Show starring Joan Rivers which aired on Fox from 1986 to 1988. He executive produced the TV Movie Joan Rivers and Friends Salute Heidi Abromowitz in 1985, as well Cher...at the Mirage in 1990. He also appeared in the documentary Joan Rivers: A Piece of Work.

=== Lawsuits ===
In 1999, after being fired by Cher, days before singing the national anthem at the Super Bowl, Sammeth sued the singer/actress for "unspecified damages", claiming that he was to receive 15% of the profits of Cher's album Believe.

Sammeth sued Joan Rivers for defamation and owed money, after he was fired directly after Rivers' win on The Celebrity Apprentice. He claims that her portrayal of him as the "missing manager" in her documentary Joan Rivers: A Piece of Work was defamatory to his career and that she owed him money for expenses he covered with his own credit cards during the filming of Celebrity Apprentice.

=== Awards and nominations ===
Sammeth was nominated as Personal Manager of the Year in the Pollstar Awards and was awarded Personal Manager of the Year by the Conference of Personal Managers in 1985.
