= Monika Mrozowska =

Polish actress (born 1980)

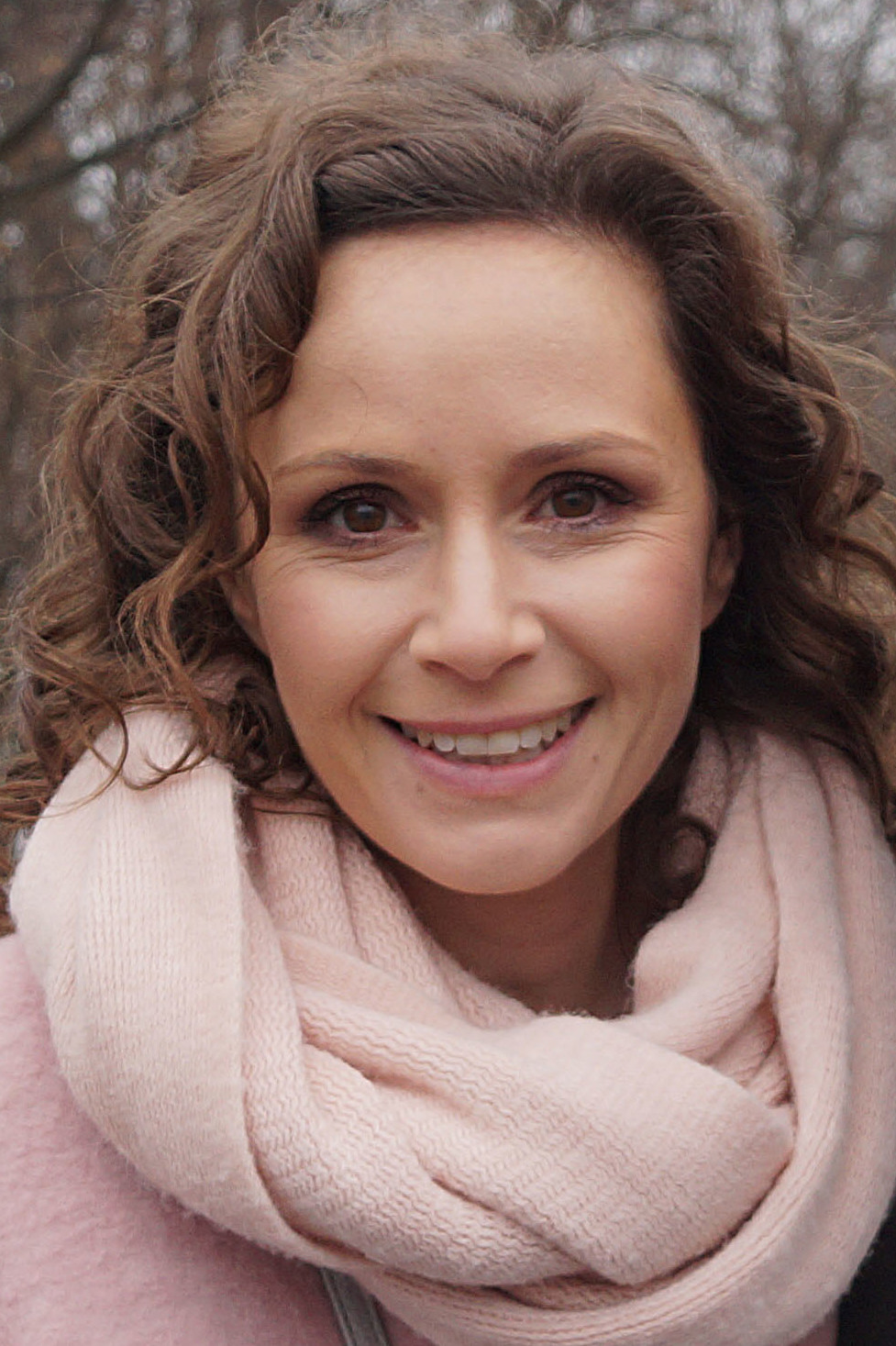
- Monima Mrozowska in 2017.
- Born: 14 May 1980 (age 45); Warsaw, Poland
- Occupation: Actress
- Years active: 1999–present
- Children: 4

Monika Kinga Mrozowska (Polish: [mɔˈɲi.ka ˈkiŋ.ɡa mrɔˈzɔf.ska]; born 14 May 1980) is a film and television actresses. She is best known for her role as Maja Kwiatkowska in television series Foster Family (1999–2009).

== Biography ==
Monika Mrozowska was born on 14 May 1980 in Warsaw, Poland.

As a child, she was a member of a children's dance and singing group Fasolki, and in 1990, she acted in a television film Joseph Conrad, which was later also released as a miniseries.

From 1999 to 2009, she portrayed Maja Kwiatkowska, one of the main characters in the television series Foster Family, which gave her nation-wide recognizability. In 1999 and 2000, she also appeared in a few plays of the Polish Television. She also appeared in the 2021 film Portret podwójny. She portrayed Joanna Zarańska in series Hotel 52, in 2011, Magdalena Chodorowska in series Sprawiedliwi – Wydział Kryminalny, from 2016 to 2020. She also appeared in the television series Usta usta (2010), Na dobre i na złe (2012), The Clan (2017), Friends (2017), and Father Matthew (2023).

She was also a contestant in the talen shows Jak oni śpiewają (2008), Celebrity Splash! (2015), and Agent (2016).

She has a degree in pedagogy and briefly worked as a school teacher, and studied ceramic making.

== Private life ==
From 2003 to 2012, she was married to Maciej Szaciłło, with whom she had two children. From 2012 to 2018, she was in a relationship with filmmaker Sebastian Jaworski, and from 2019 to 2021, she was in a relationship with producer Maciej Auguścik-Lipka, having one child with each of them. She is vegetarian.

== Filmography ==
=== Films ===
Year	Title	Role	Notes
1990	Joseph Conrad	Ludmiła	Feature film
1999	Blues	Monika	Television play
1999	W Nieparyżu i gdzie indziej	Hania	Television play
2000	Sandra K.	Marysia	Television play
2001	Portret podwójny	Leaflet distributor	Feature film

=== Television series ===
Year	Title	Role	Notes
1991	Joseph Conrad	Ludmiła	Miniseries; 3 episodes
1999–2009	Foster Family	Maja Kwiatkowska	Main role; 152 episodes
2010	Usta usta	Maria	Episode no. 23
2011	Hotel 52	Joanna Zarańska	9 episodes
2012	Na dobre i na złe	Roma Żbik	Episode: "Pamięć serca" (no. 498)
2016–2020	Sprawiedliwi – Wydział Kryminalny	Magdalena Chodorowska	Recurring role
2017	Friends	Beata's friend	2 episodes
2017	The Clan	Natalia Blum	17 episodes
2023	Father Matthew	Edyta Zacharska	Episode: "Co Bóg daje" (no. 391)
