= Śpiewajmy razem. All Together Now =

Musical Talent Competition

- Genre: Reality, Talent show
- Presented by: Igor Kwiatkowski (1); Mariusz Kałamaga (2)
- Country of origin: Poland
- Original language: Polish
- No. of seasons: 2
- No. of episodes: 16

Production
- Running time: 66 minutes
- Production company: Endemol Shine Polska

Original release
- Network: Polsat
- Release: 5 September 2018 – 24 April 2019

Related
- All Together Now

Śpiewajmy razem. All Together Now is a Polish television musical talent competition based on a British show All Together Now hosted by Mariusz Kałamaga (previously Igor Kwiatkowski) and broadcast on Polsat. The first season premiered on September 5, 2018.

== Format ==
Contestants on the program showcase their skills before a hundred member jury. One juror eventually joins in on the singing for the contestants. Each episode the best ranked contestants pass on to the next round of the competition including the jurors' first place pick and the extra time winner (for which the second and third place winners go). The contestants are fighting to become finalists and to earn a cash prize and to become the winner.

== Summary ==
To date, 2 seasons have been broadcast, as summarised below. A few months later, Polsat announced that they had no plans for a third season.

Season	Start	Finish	Winner	Runner-up	Third Place	Presenter(s)
1	5 September 2018	24 October 2018	Mateusz Łopaciuk	Natalia Zaręba	Mariusz Suchożebrski	Igor Kwiatkowski
2	6 March 2019	24 April 2019	Salwin Merstein-Siwak	Beata Noszczyńska	Tomasz Filipczak	Mariusz Kałamaga

== Episodes ==
There were eight episodes broadcast in each season.

== Jurors ==
Singer Ewa Farna was the captain of the jury in the first edition, but she was replaced with Beata Kozidrak for the next season. Others involved in the show include Saszan, Nick Sinckler, Ramona Rey, Stanisław Karpiel-Bułecka, Paweł Stasiak, Arkadiusz Kłusowski, Madox, Alia Fay, Tabb and Dariusz Kordek.
