= Miss Poland =

Miss Poland may refer to:

- Miss Polonia
- Miss Polski
