= Elżbieta Romanowska =

Polish actress (born 1983)

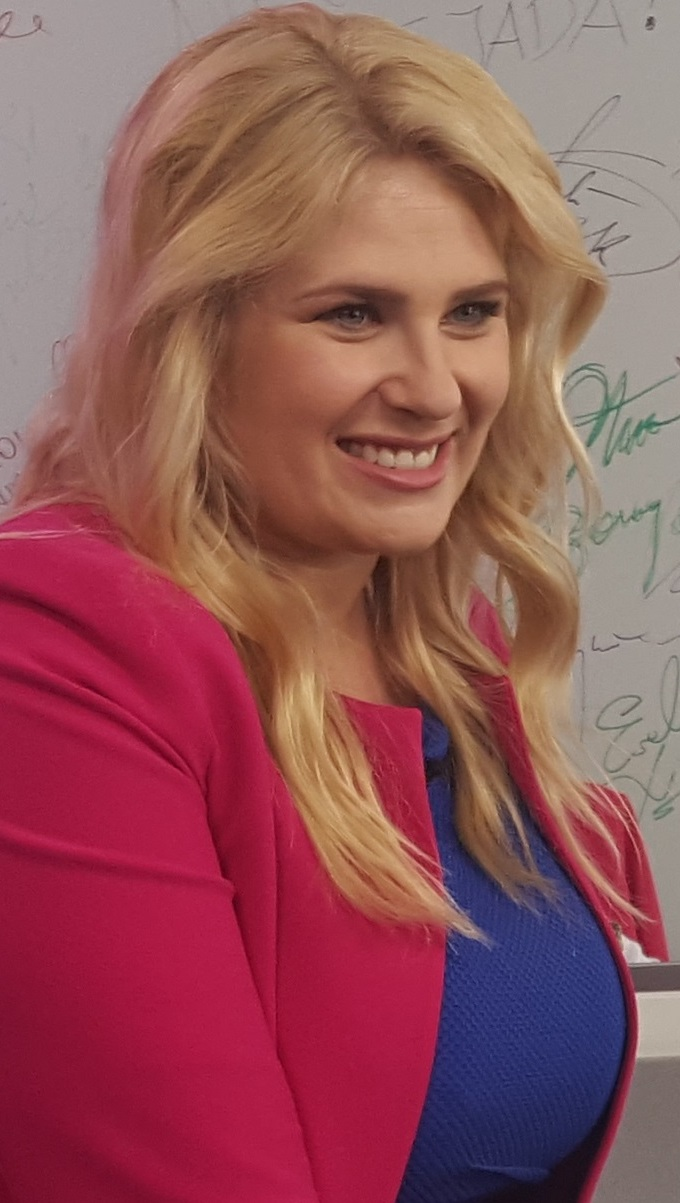
- Elżbieta Romanowska
- Born: 4 June 1983 (age 42); Głogów, Poland
- Occupation: Actress
- Years active: 2007–present

Elżbieta Romanowska (born 4 June 1983 in Głogów, Poland) is a Polish film, television and theater actress. A graduate of the Ludwik Solski Academy for the Dramatic Arts in Wrocław, she is best known for the Polish TV series Ranczo (Ranch) and 2XL.

In 2008 she participated in the 4th edition of the show Jak oni śpiewają (How They Sing), taking 6th place.

== Selected filmography ==
- 2007: Na Wspólnej as Pamela
- 2007: Na dobre i na złe as Basia Osiak
- 2008–2016: Ranczo (Ranch) as shopkeeper Jola
- 2009: M jak miłość (L for Love) as pregnant Bogusia
- 2009: BrzydUla as Aldona Turek, sister of Adam
- 2010: Ciacho as nurse
- 2010: Licencja na wychowanie as Kasia
- 2011: Jak się pozbyć cellulitu as Krystian's wife
- 2011: 1920 Bitwa warszawska as milkmaid
- 2012: Ja to mam szczęście as Paula, Tadeusz's girl
- 2012: Prawo Agaty as Maja Lipiec, friend of Iwona (ep. 12)
- 2013–present: 2XL as Agata Dec
- 2014–present: Słodkie życie (Sweet Life) as Klara
- 2015–present: Pierwsza miłość (First love) as ???
