= Joanna Liszowska =

Polish actress, singer and model

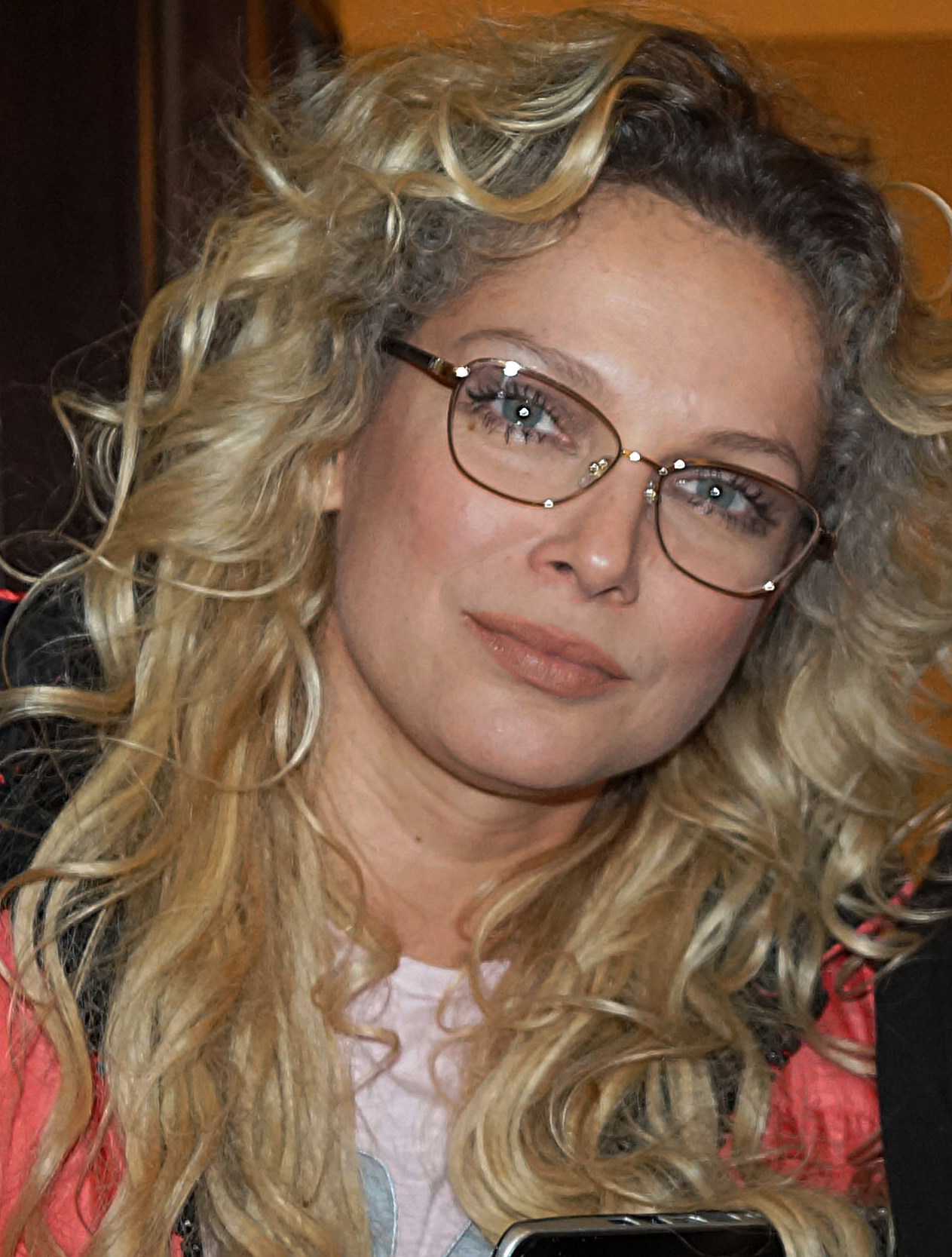
- Born: 12 December 1978 (age 47); Kraków, Poland
- Education: Ludwik Solski Academy for the Dramatic Arts
- Occupations: Actress, singer, model, television personality
- Spouse: Ola Serneke
- Children: 2 (daughters)
- Musical career
- Genres: Pop
- Instrument: Vocals
- Years active: 2001–present

Joanna Patrycja Liszowska Serneke (born 12 December 1978 in Kraków), is a Polish actress, singer and model.

In 2007, Liszowska won the 2nd season of Jak oni śpiewają, the Polish edition of Soapstar Superstar.

From 2012, she is a juror in the Polish program Got to Dance – Tylko Taniec.

== Filmography ==
- Szpital na perypetiach (2002) – Edyta Kąkola-Kulawik
- Kasia i Tomek (2003) – Ewa
- M jak miłość (TV series, 2003–2004) – Zuzia - a nurse
- Miodowe lata (TV series, 2003) – Joanna
- Psie serce (TV, 2003) – Ala ("Max")
- Rodzinka (2003) – Eliza Przepiórka
- Czwarta władza (2004) – Maryla
- Święta polskie (TV series, 2004)
- Kryminalni (TV series, 2005–2006) – Iza - journalist
- Kto nigdy nie żył... (2005) – Ela
- Lawstorant (2005) – Marta
- Legenda (2005) – Lucyna
- Na dobre i na złe (TV) – Dorota Lewkiewicz-Czyż, radiologist
- U fryzjera (TV, 2006) – Laura
- Who Never Lived (2006)
- Sztuczki (2007) – Violka

== Discography ==
- 2007: Jak Oni Śpiewają?
