= Katarzyna Cichopek =

Polish actress (born 1982)

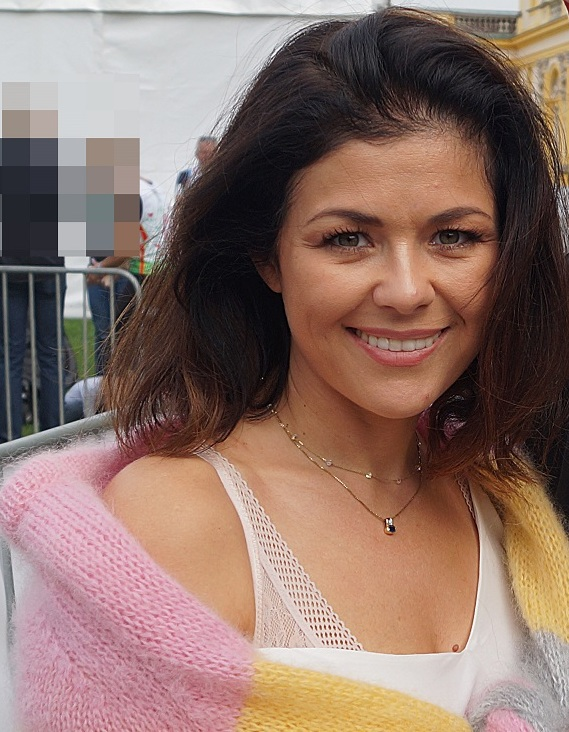
- Born: 7 October 1982 (age 43); Warsaw, Poland
- Occupation: Actress

Katarzyna Cichopek (born 7 October 1982 in Warsaw, Poland) is a Polish actress.

She is best known to the Polish audience as Kinga Zduńska, starring in the series M jak miłość (L for Love) which is watched by nearly 10 million people. She is the winner of the popular TV show Taniec z Gwiazdami (Polish Dancing with the Stars). She was the host of Jak oni śpiewają? (Polish version of Soapstar Superstar).

== Career ==
=== 1997 ===
Cichopek acted in the serial Boża podszewka as Elżutka.

=== 2000 ===
She was in the serial M jak miłość as Kinga Zduńska.

=== 2004 ===
She took part in the serial Dziki as Zosia Walczakowa.

=== 2005 ===
She was on the Polish Dancing with the stars: Taniec z Gwiazdami.

Cichopek became laureate of the award Viva! Najpiękniejsi.

=== 2006 ===
She became presenter of the festival "TOPTrendy".

=== 2007 ===
She became presenter on popular show Jak Oni Śpiewają? (Soapstar Superstar) and at the festival "TOPTrendy."

In the Eurovision Dance Contest 2007 Kasia Cichopek and Marcin Hakiel were in 4 place.

=== 2008 ===
She married Marcin Hakiel. They have a son Adam (born 2009) and a daughter Helena (born 2013), who in June 2021 performed for the first time on the stage of the Musical Theater "Roma".

Cichopek was a guest star in TV series Agentki as Anna Migdalska, I kto tu rządzi? as Iwona, and Daleko od noszy as Joasia.

=== 2009 ===
She took part in the TV series Tancerze as Klaudia.

=== 2010 ===
She made her debut as a theater actress on the stage of the Kamienica Theater in Warsaw.

=== 2013 ===
She played in the music video for the song "All at once" by Liber and Natalia Szroeder.

== Actress ==
- Boża podszewka (1997) as Elżutka
- Dziki (2004) as Zosia Walczakowa
- M jak miłość (2000- ) as Kinga Filarska-Zduńska

== Dancing with the Stars ==
In 2005 Cichopek took part in season 2 of Taniec z Gwiazdami. She danced with Marcin Hakiel and won the season.

Week	Dance	Points
1	Waltz (International Standard)	36
2	Rumba	36
3	Tango	36
4	Paso doble	36
5	Samba	36
6	Foxtrot	35
7	Jive	34
8	Quickstep and Rumba	(34 and 40) 74
9	Cha-cha and Waltz (International Standard)	(35 and 40) 75
10 FINALE	Samba, Tango and Freestyle	(39,39 and 40) 118

On September 4, 2006 she and partner Marcin Hakiel won "Finał Finałów" - finale season 3.

Period	Dance	Points
1	Waltz (International Standard) and Cha-cha	(40 and 40) 80
2	Rumba and Tango	(40 and 40) 80
3	Freestyle	40

== See also ==
- Eurovision Dance Contest
- Eurovision Dance Contest 2007

Preceded by Olivier Janiak & Kamila Kajak	Dancing with the Stars (Polish TV series) winner Season 2 (Autumn 2005 with Marcin Hakiel)	Succeeded by Rafał Mroczek & Aneta Piotrowska
