= Jacek Kawalec =

Polish actor, game show and television personality

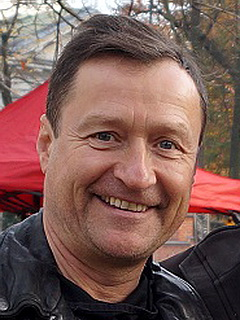

Jacek Kawalec (born 29 September 1961 in Warsaw) is a Polish actor, game show and television personality.

He gained popularity as a host of one of the first American shows to be licensed and remade to be broadcast on Polish television - 'Randka w ciemno' (the format of The Dating Game). After he quit the show in 1998, due to a fire accident which was broadcast live, Kawalec became a dubbing actor in animated films with leading roles in such hits as Finding Nemo (Gdzie jest Nemo?) or Ice Age (Epoka lodowcowa).

In 2006 he received a role in the popular TVP TV series Ranczo; he created (2006–2009, 2011–2016) the character of a local teacher of Polish literature.
