= Joanna Trzepiecińska =

Polish actress (born 1965)

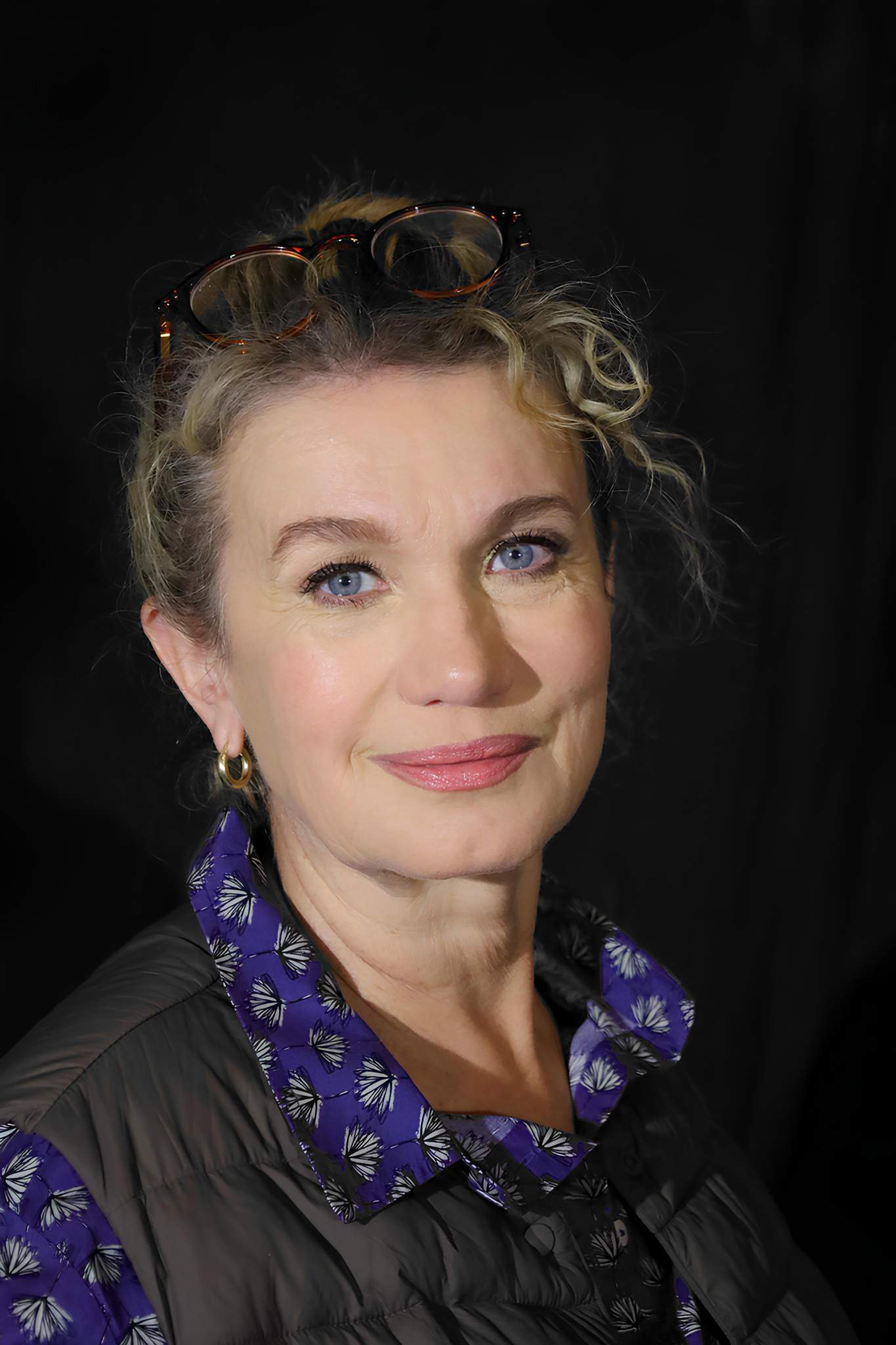
- Joanna Trzepiecińska in 2025
- Born: 7 September 1965 (age 60); Tomaszów Mazowiecki, Poland
- Occupation: Actress
- Years active: 1987–present

Joanna Trzepiecińska (born 7 September 1965 in Tomaszów Mazowiecki, Poland) is a Polish film, television and theater actress, best known for playing in the Polish TV series Rodzina zastępcza (Foster Family).

== Filmography ==
=== Actress ===
- 1987 Rzeka kłamstwa as Joanna Macieszanka
- 1988 Dotknięci as Wanda Milewska
- 1989 Czarny wąwóz as Lotka
- 1989 Stan strachu as Iwona
- 1989 Sztuka kochania as Anna
- 1990 Kanalia as Tamara
- 1990 Powrót wilczycy as Iza Ziębalska
- 1990 W środku Europy as Bożena
- 1991 Nad rzeką, której nie ma as Marta
- 1991 Obywatel świata as Joasia
- 1991 Panny i wdowy as Karolina
- 1991 Papierowe małżeństwo (Paper Marriage) as Alicja Strzałkowska
- 1993 Balanga as the woman
- 1993 Do widzenia wczoraj. Dwie krótkie komedie o zmianie systemu as Zosia's Mother
- 1993 Łowca. Ostatnie starcie as Parvina
- 1994 Molly as Kasia
- 1994 Blood of the Innocent as Anna
- 1995 Dzieje mistrza Twardowskiego as the ghost of Barbara Radziwiłłówna
- 1995 Prowokator as Anna Kawielin
- 1996 Bar Atlantic as Hanka Rupcuś-Gąsienica
- 2000–2005 Plebania as Anna Stajniak
- 2000–2009 Rodzina zastępcza/Rodzina zastępcza plus (Foster Family / Foster Family and Others) as Alutka Kossoń
- 2002 Na dobre i na złe as Renata Zawadzka
- 2005 Anioł Stróż as Anna Górska
- 2006–2007 Pogoda na piątek as Jola
- 2008–2011 Barwy szczęścia as Renata
- 2008 I kto tu rządzi? as Anka
- 2014 Na Wspólnej as Betty Sulinsky, Nicole's Mother

=== Dubbing in Polish ===
- 1997 Anastasia as Anya / Anastasia (second dub)
- 2000 The Miracle Maker as Mary Magdalene
- 2000 The Adventures of Rocky and Bullwinkle as Natasha Fatale
- 2003 Finding Nemo as Dory
- 2003 Exploring the Reef as Dory
- 2004 Shark Tale as Angie
- 2005 Robots as Cappy
- 2007 Bee Movie as Vanessa
- 2008 Beverly Hills Chihuahua as Aunt Wanda
