= Jerzy Zelnik =

Polish actor (born 1945)

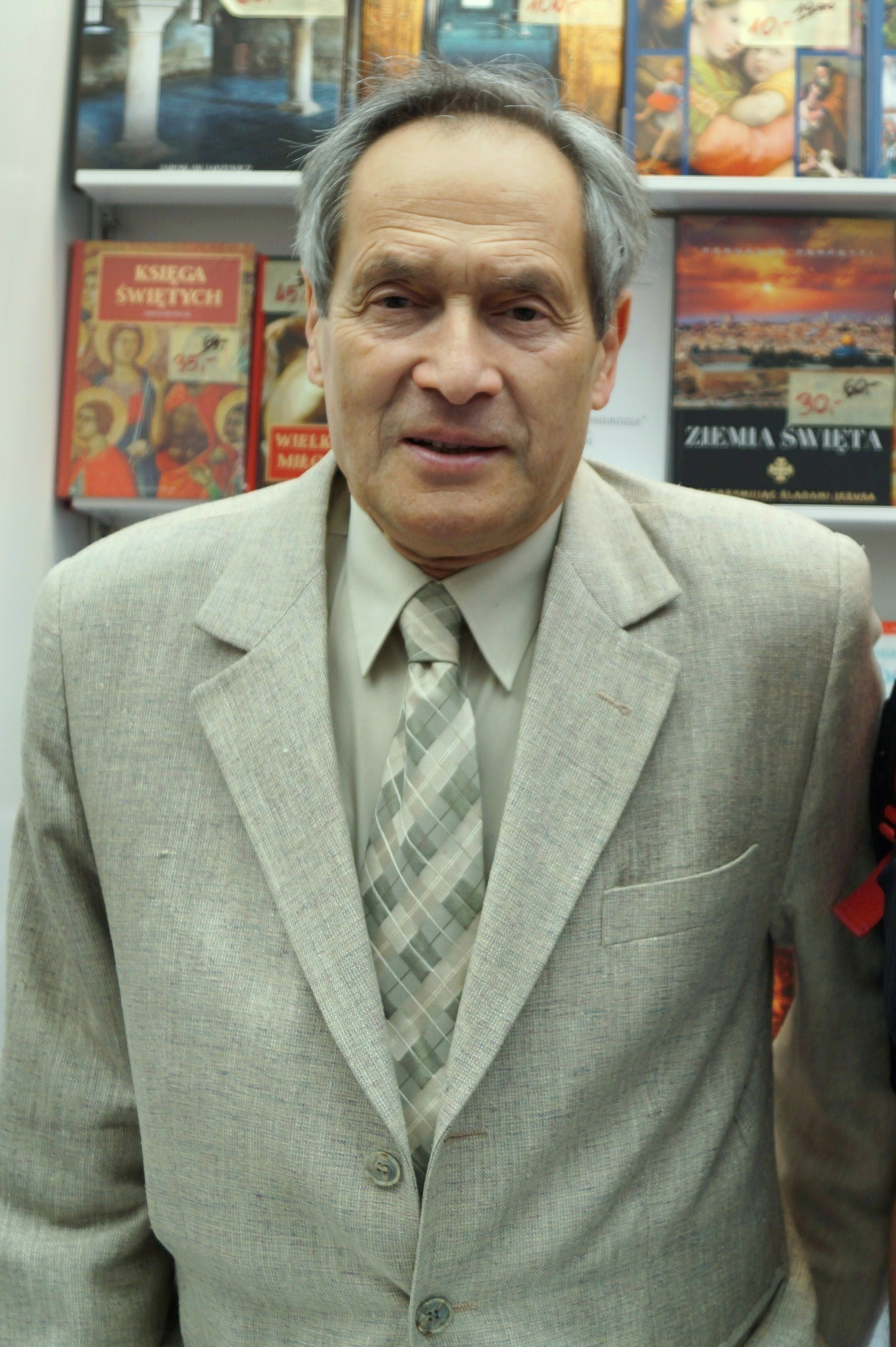
- Born: 14 September 1945 (age 80); Kraków, Poland
- Occupation: Actor
- Years active: 1963–present

Jerzy Zelnik (born 14 September 1945) is a Polish actor. He has appeared in more than 60 films and television shows since 1963. He was awarded the Badge of Merit in Culture (1997) and Knight's Cross of the Order of Polonia Restituta (2007).

== Selected filmography ==
- Pharaoh (1966)
- Landscape After the Battle (1970)
- The Story of Sin (1975)
- The Promised Land (1975)
- The Last Ferry (1989)
- Chopin: Desire for Love (2002)
