= Soapstar Superstar =

British television series

- Genre: Talent show
- Presented by: Ben Shephard (2006); Fern Britton (2006); Zoe Ball (2007)
- Judges: Billy Sammeth; Chris Cowey; Cilla Black (2006); Martine McCutcheon (2007); Michael Ball (2007); David Gest (2007)
- Country of origin: United Kingdom
- Original language: English
- No. of series: 2
- No. of episodes: 18

Production
- Production location: Granada Studios
- Running time: 60 to 90 minutes
- Production company: Granada

Original release
- Network: ITV
- Release: 6 January 2006 – 13 January 2007

Soapstar Superstar is a British talent show that aired on ITV from 6 January 2006 to 13 January 2007. The show's format works in a similar format to that of Pop Idol and The X Factor, in that the competition features a group of soap opera actors performing in front of a celebrity panel of judges, with the weakest performers being eliminated when they receive the fewest votes from the judges and a public vote. Unlike these shows, the audience decides upon the song contestants sung in the next round, with the eliminated contestant joining the judging panel for that episode to save one of the other contestants and decide on which song they would sing next.

== Presenters and judges ==
The first series was hosted by Fern Britton and Ben Shephard, with Jayne Middlemiss and Duncan James hosting a companion show for the series on ITV2, entitled Soapstar Superstar: Extra Tracks. For the second series, the show was presented by Zoe Ball, with the ITV2 companion show, retitled as Soapstar Superstar: Bonus Tracks, hosted by Mark Durden-Smith, Sheree Murphy and Rob Deering. Both series featured Billy Sammeth and Chris Cowey as part of the judging panel, with assistance from Cilla Black in 2006, and Martine McCutcheon and Michael Ball in 2007.

== Series overview ==
=== Series 1 results ===
Place	Actor	Soap
1st	Richard Fleeshman	Coronation Street
2nd	Andy Whyment	Coronation Street
3rd	Lucy Pargeter	Crossroads & Emmerdale
4th	Roxanne Pallett	Emmerdale
5th	Lee Otway	Hollyoaks
6th	Wendi Peters	Coronation Street
7th	Shobna Gulati	Coronation Street
8th	Nicholas Bailey	EastEnders
9th	Michael Greco	EastEnders
10th	Sammy Winward	Emmerdale

=== Series 2 results ===
Place	Actor	Soap
1st	Antony Cotton	Coronation Street
2nd	Hayley Tamaddon	Emmerdale
3rd	Mark Furze	Home and Away
4th	Tupele Dorgu	Coronation Street
5th	Gemma Atkinson	Hollyoaks
6th	Alan Fletcher	Neighbours
7th	Leon Lopez ^{1}	Brookside
8th	Matthew Wolfenden	Emmerdale
9th	Verity Rushworth	Emmerdale
10th	Jane Danson	Coronation Street
11th	Elaine Lordan	EastEnders

- ^1 Lopez was a replacement for Ben Freeman, who was forced to deal with a court case abroad at the time.

== Transmissions ==
Series	Start date	End date	Episodes
1	6 January 2006	14 January 2006	8
2	5 January 2007	13 January 2007	10

== Controversy ==
On 18 October 2007, after an in-depth investigation of ITV phone-in shows by Deloitte, it was revealed that phone-in votes for songs and even votes for contestants to go through to the next round had been manipulated by the programme makers. This involved some 20% of the viewers' votes for songs being ignored, and Jane Danson and Tupele Dorgu being put up for eviction in the first episode when the bottom two contestants by votes were actually Verity Rushworth and Leon Lopez.

As a result, Granada Television, who produced the programme, was fined £1.2 million by Ofcom. ITV aired an Ofcom summary of findings announcement just before the final of the second series of Britain's Got Talent on 31 May 2008. It was shown again on 8 June 2008 before that night's episode of Coronation Street.

== Cancellation ==
Despite drawing in impressive viewing figures, ITV felt that the show had reached its "natural conclusion", and thus announced on 25 May 2007 that the programme had been axed. Amongst its reasons for the decision was the belief that the programme had become too similar to the broadcaster's other hit show, The X Factor.

== International versions ==
The Polish edition of Soapstar Superstar, Jak oni śpiewają (How They Sing) aired from 3 March until 2 June 2007. It was won by Agnieszka Włodarczyk (Weronika Potoczny from "Plebania"). The second season ran from 8 September until 15 December 2007. The winner was Joanna Liszowska (Dorota Lewkiewicz from "Na dobre i na złe"). The third season aired from 8 March until 31 May 2008. It was won by Krzysztof Respondek (Michał Jeleń from "Barwy Szczęścia"). The fourth season ran from 6 September until 6 December 2008. The winner was Artur Chamski. The 5th season won Laura Samojłowicz. The 6th season was won by Krzysztof Respondek again (it was All Star Season). The relaunch, broadcast on public channel TVP2, was announced on 12 February 2020 and is renamed to Star Voice. Gwiazdy mają głos (Star Voice - Stars have voice). Hosted by Michalina Sosna and Mariusz Czerkawski, it would start broadcasting on 28 February 2020.

In Belgium, the third season of Steracteur Sterartiest is currently airing on één, all editions were hosted by Katja Retsin and Thomas Vanderveken.
