= Jak oni śpiewają season 5 =

Jak oni śpiewają
- Season 5
- Hosted by: Joanna Liszowska; Krzysztof Ibisz
- Judges: Edyta Górniak; Rudi Schuberth; Elżbieta Zapendowska
- Winner: Laura Samojłowicz
- Runner-up: Maciej Jachowski

Release
- Original network: Polsat
- Original release: March 7 – May 23, 2009

Season chronology
- ← Previous; Season 4 Next → Season 6

The 5th season of Jak oni śpiewają, the Polish edition of Soapstar Superstar, started on March 7, 2009, and ended on May 23, 2009. It was broadcast by Polsat. Joanna Liszowska and Krzysztof Ibisz continued as the hosts, and the judges were: Edyta Górniak, Elżbieta Zapendowska and Rudi Schuberth.

== Stars ==
Celebrity	Character	Soap	Status
Andrzej Deskur	Radek Lewański	"Na kocią łapę" Polsat	Eliminated 1st on March 14, 2009
Marcin Kwaśny	Marcin Wilczyński	"Rezerwat"	Eliminated 2nd on March 21, 2009
Katarzyna Żak	Kazimiera Solejukowa	"Ranczo" TVP1	Eliminated 3rd on March 28, 2009
Daniel Wieleba	-	Lotto	Eliminated 4th on April 4, 2009
Aleksandra Nieśpielak	Anka	"Barwy szczęścia" TVP2	Eliminated 5th on April 11, 2009
Samuel Palmer	Sam Smith	"Barwy szczęścia" TVP2	Eliminated 6th on April 18, 2009
Jacek Borkowski	Piotr Rafalski	"Klan" TVP1	Eliminated 7th on April 25, 2009
Maria Niklińska	Jagoda	"Pierwsza miłość" Polsat	Eliminated 8th on May 2, 2009
Bożena Dykiel	Maria Zięba	"Na Wspólnej" TVN	Eliminated 9th on May 9, 2009
Krzysztof Hanke	Hubert Dworniok	"Święta wojna" TVP2	Eliminated 10th on May 16, 2009
Aleksandra Zienkiewicz	Kinga Żukowska	"Pierwsza miłość" Polsat	Eliminated 11th on May 23, 2009
Robert Kudelski	Michał Brzozowski	"Na Wspólnej" TVN	Third Place on May 23, 2009
Maciej Jachowski	Ireneusz Podleśny	"M jak miłość" TVP2	Second Place on May 23, 2009
Laura Samojłowicz	Maja Chojnacka	"M jak miłość" TVP2	Winner on May 23, 2009

== Scores ==
Couple	Place	1	2	3	4	5	6	7	8	9	10	11	12
Laura Samojłowicz	1	5.1	5.3	4.8	5.8	5.5	5.8	6.0	5.9	6.0 + 6.0 = 12.0	5.5 + 6.0 = 11.5	5.5 + 5.9 = 11.4	5.7 + 6.0 + 6.0 = 17.7
Maciej Jachowski	2	4.8	4.3	5.9	5.3	5.5	5.8	5.9	6.0	6.0 + 6.0 = 12.0	4.5 + 5.5 = 10.0	4.8 + 5.8 = 10.6	6.0 + 6.0 + 6.0 = 18.0
Robert Kudelski	3	5.8	4.3	6.0	5.3	5.0	5.5	5.9	5.6	5.0 + 6.0 = 11.0	5.9 + 5.8 = 11.7	5.8 + 5.7 = 11.5	5.0 + 6.0 = 11.0
Aleksandra Zienkiewicz	4	5.3	4.1	4.5	5.8	5.8	5.8	5.8	6.0	5.5. + 5.9 = 11.4	4.8 + 5.3 = 11.1	4.1 + 5.8 = 9.9	5.5
Krzysztof Hanke	5	5.6	6.0	5.0	5.9	5.9	5.6	4.8	6.0	6.0 + 6.0 = 12.0	5.8 + 6.0 = 11.8	3.8	
Bożena Dykiel	6	5.5	4.8	5.3	5.8	5.8	6.0	5.5	6.0	5.3 + 5.9 = 11.2			
Maria Niklińska	7	4.3	5.0	5.4	4.5	5.3	5.8	4.8	5.8				
Jacek Borkowski	8	5.5	3.8	5.9	5.5	4.6	6.0	4.8	6.0				
Samuel Palmer	9	4.5	6.0	5.3	4.0	4.5	5.8						
Aleksandra Nieśpielak	10	5.0	4.5	5.0	5.3	3.8							
Daniel Wieleba	11	4.5	5.8	5.5	3.3								
Katarzyna Żak	12	5.6	5.1	5.3									
Marcin Kwaśny	13	5.5	3.8										
Andrzej Deskur	14	5.1											

Red numbers indicate the lowest score for each week.
Green numbers indicate the highest score for each week.
indicates the star eliminated that week.
indicates the returning stars that finished in the bottom two.
indicates the star who has got immunitet

=== Best Score (6.0) ===
No.	Star	Song	Episode	6.0
1	Krzysztof Hanke	Macho, Krzysztof Kasowski	2	5
1	Krzysztof Hanke	Mój przyjacielu, Krzysztof Krawczyk	8	5
1	Krzysztof Hanke	Nie płacz, kiedy odjadę, Marino Marini	9	5
1	Krzysztof Hanke	Baby, ach te baby!, Ryszard Rynkowski & Andrzej Zaucha	9	5
1	Krzysztof Hanke	Ściernisko, Golec uOrkiestra	10	5
2	Samuel Palmer	Wake me up before you go go, Wham!	2	1
3	Aleksandra Zienkiewicz	Dumka na dwa serca, Edyta Górniak & Mieczysław Szcześniak	8	1
5	Bożena Dykiel	Jesteśmy na wczasach, Wojciech Młynarski	6	2
5	Bożena Dykiel	Czy te oczy mogą kłamać?, Jan Pietrzak	8	2
7	Maciej Jachowski	The time of my life, Dirty Dancing	8	6
7	Maciej Jachowski	Senza una donna, Zucchero	9	6
7	Maciej Jachowski	Wznieś serce nad zło, Ryszard Rynkowski	9	6
7	Maciej Jachowski	S.O.S, Kasia Cerekwicka	12	6
7	Maciej Jachowski	Czas nas uczy pogody, Grażyna Łobaszewska	12	6
7	Maciej Jachowski	I Want to Know What Love is, Foreigner	12	6
8	Robert Kudelski	Et si tu n'existais pas, Joe Dassin	3	3
8	Robert Kudelski	Baila, Zucchero	9	3
8	Robert Kudelski	Şımarık, Tarkan	12	3
12	Laura Samojłowicz	Strong Enough, Cher	7	6
12	Laura Samojłowicz	Lasciate Mi Cantare, Toto Cutugno	9	6
12	Laura Samojłowicz	Nie budźcie marzeń ze snu, Ryszard Rynkowski	9	6
12	Laura Samojłowicz	No one, Alicia Keys	10	6
12	Laura Samojłowicz	I would do anything for love, Meat Loaf	12	6
12	Laura Samojłowicz	Knockin' on heaven's door, Guns N' Roses	12	6
14	Jacek Borkowski	Czerwony autobus, Jacek Kaczmarski	6	2
14	Jacek Borkowski	Z tobą chcę oglądać świat, Zdzisława Sośnicka & Zbigniew Wodecki	8	2

=== Average Chart ===
Place	Star	Average	Best Score	Worst Score	Total	Number of songs
1.	Laura Samojłowicz	5.70	6.0	4.8	96.8	17
2.	Bożena Dykiel	5.59	6.0	4.8	55.9	10
3.	Krzysztof Hanke	5.50	6.0	3.8	71.4	13
4.	Robert Kudelski	5.53	6.0	4.3	88.6	16
5.	Maciej Jachowski	5.54	6.0	4.3	94.1	17
6.	Aleksandra Zienkiewicz	5.40	6.0	4.1	81	15
7.	Katarzyna Żak	5.34	5.6	5.1	16	3
8.	Jacek Borkowski	5.27	6.0	3.8	42.1	8
9.	Maria Niklińska	5.11	5.8	4.3	40.9	8
10.	Andrzej Deskur	5.10	5.1	5.1	5.1	1
11.	Samuel Palmer	5.02	6.0	4.0	30.1	6
12.	Daniel Wieleba	4.78	5.8	3.3	19.1	4
13.	Aleksandra Nieśpielak	4.72	5.3	3.8	23.6	5
14.	Marcin Kwaśny	4.65	5.5	3.8	9.3	2
Everystar		5.48	6.0	3.3	674	123

== Guest Performances ==
Episode	Date	Artist(s)	Song(s)
1	March 7, 2009	Artur Chamski (4th Season Winner)	"Kilka Słów"
3	March 21, 2009	Andrzej Piaseczny	"Chodź, przytul, przebacz"
6	April 11, 2009	Edyta Górniak	"Dziwny jest ten świat"
8	April 25, 2009	Karolina Nowakowska & Łukasz Zagrobelny	"Nie kłam że kochasz mnie"
8	April 25, 2009	Joanna Liszowska & Krzysztof Ibisz	"Total Eclipse of the Heart"
9	May 2, 2009	Ryszard Rynkowski	"Leżę sobie"
9	May 2, 2009	Drupi	"Sereno é"
10	May 9, 2009	Golec uOrkiestra	"Góralskie tango"
10	May 9, 2009	Feel	"Pokaż mi niebo"
10	May 9, 2009	Rudi Schuberth	"Ciebie brak"
11	May 16, 2009	Damian Aleksander & Edyta Krzemień	"The Phantom of the Opera"
11	May 16, 2009	Bajm	"Zabierz mnie tam"
12	May 23, 2009	Edyta Górniak	"I Will Always Love You"
12	May 23, 2009	Justyna Steczkowska	"Skłam"
12	May 23, 2009	Joanna Liszowska & Piotr Rubik	"Teraz wiem"

== Episodes ==
=== Week 1 ===
Individual judges scores in charts below (given in parentheses) are listed in this order from left to right: Edyta Górniak, Elżbieta Zapendowska, Rudi Schuberth, Katarzyna Cichopek.

Running order

Star	Score	Song
Krzysztof Hanke	5.6 (5,6,5.5,6)	Łaskowyj Maj - "Biełyje Rozy"
Samuel Palmer	4.5 (3,5,4,6)	Barry Manilow - "Copacabana"
Aleksandra Zienkiewicz	5.3 (5,5,5,6)	Zbigniew Wodecki - "Chałupy Welcome To"
Andrzej Deskur	5.1 (4,6,4.5,6)	Carlos Santana & Maná - "Corazón espinado"
Bożena Dykiel	5.5 (5,6,5,6)	Janusz Gniatkowski - "Kuba, wyspa jak wulkan gorąca"
Maria Niklińska	4.3 (3,5,3,6)	Madonna - "La Isla Bonita"
Maciej Jachowski	4.8 (4,5,4,6)	Franek Kimono - "King Bruce Lee - karate mistrz"
Robert Kudelski	5.8 (5,6,6,6)	Garou - "Gitan"
Katarzyna Żak	5.6 (5,6,5.5,6)	"My Cyganie"
Marcin Kwaśny	5.5 (5,6,5,6)	Antonio Banderas - "Canción del mariachi"
Daniel Wieleba	4.5 (3,5,4,6)	The Shorts - "Comment ça va"
Laura Samojłowicz	5.1 (5,6,3.5,6)	Afric Simone - "Hafanana"
Aleksandra Nieśpielak	5.0 (4,5,5,6)	Vaya Con Dios - "Nah Neh Nah"
Jacek Borkowski	5.5 (5,6,5,6)	Frank Sinatra - "New York, New York"

=== Week 2 ===
Individual judges scores in charts below (given in parentheses) are listed in this order from left to right: Edyta Górniak, Elżbieta Zapendowska, Rudi Schuberth, Marcin Miller.

Running order

Star	Score	Song
Krzysztof Hanke	6.0 (6,6,6,6)	K.A.S.A. - "Macho"
Samuel Palmer	6.0 (6,6,6,6)	Wham! - "Wake Me Up Before You Go-Go"
Aleksandra Zienkiewicz	4.1 (4,4,4.5,4)	ABBA - "S.O.S."
Bożena Dykiel	4.8 (4,5,4,6)	Shazza - "Bierz, co chcesz"
Maria Niklińska	5.0 (5,5,4,6)	Andy Williams - "Can't Take My Eyes Off Of You"
Maciej Jachowski	4.3 (3,5,4,5)	Haddaway - "What Is Love"
Robert Kudelski	4.5 (4,5,4,5)	Enrique Iglesias - "Bailamos"
Katarzyna Żak	5.1 (4,5,5.5,6)	Modern Talking - "You're My Heart, You're My Soul"
Marcin Kwaśny	3.8 (2,4,3,6)	Boys - "Jesteś szalona"
Daniel Wieleba	5.8 (6,6,5,6)	Norbi - "Kobiety są gorące"
Laura Samojłowicz	5.3 (4,6,5,6)	Kylie Minogue - "In Your Eyes"
Aleksandra Nieśpielak	4.5 (4,5,4,5)	Rihanna - "Don't Stop The Music"
Jacek Borkowski	3.8 (1,5,4,5)	Tom Jones - "Sex Bomb"
Andrzej Deskur	-	Ich Troje -"A wszystko to bo ciebie kocham"

=== Week 3 ===
Individual judges scores in charts below (given in parentheses) are listed in this order from left to right: Edyta Górniak, Elżbieta Zapendowska, Rudi Schuberth, Andrzej Piaseczny.

Running order

Star	Score	Song
Krzysztof Hanke	5.0 (6,5,4,5)	Andrzej Dąbrowski - "Do zakochania jeden krok"
Samuel Palmer	5.3 (6,5,5,5)	Perfect - "Kołysanka dla nieznajomej"
Aleksandra Zienkiewicz	4.5 (4,5,4,5)	Roxette - "Listen To You Heart"
Bożena Dykiel	5.3 (5,6,5,5)	Budka Suflera - "Takie Tango"
Maria Niklińska	5.4 (6,6,4.5,5)	The Cardigans - "Lovefool"
Maciej Jachowski	5.9 (6,6,5.5,6)	Ten Sharp - "You"
Robert Kudelski	6.0 (6,6,6,6)	Joe Dassin - "Et si tu n'existais pas"
Katarzyna Żak	5.3 (6,6,4,5)	Rod Stewart - "When I Need You"
Daniel Wieleba	5.5 (6,6,5,5)	De Pres - "Bo jo cie kochom"
Laura Samojłowicz	4.8 (4,5,5,5)	T.Love - "I Love You"
Aleksandra Nieśpielak	5.0 (6,6,4,4)	Beverly Craven - "Promise Me"
Jacek Borkowski	5.9 (6,6,5.5,6)	Charles Aznavour - "She"

=== Week 4 ===
Individual judges scores in charts below (given in parentheses) are listed in this order from left to right: Edyta Górniak, Elżbieta Zapendowska, Rudi Schuberth, Jan Borysewicz.

Running order

Star	Score	Song
Krzysztof Hanke	5.9 (6,6,5.5,6)	Chłopcy z Placu Broni - "O! Ela"
Samuel Palmer	4.0 (4,4,3,5)	Limahl - "Never Ending Story"
Aleksandra Zienkiewicz	5.8 (6,6,5,6)	Bajm - "Nie ma wody na pustyni"
Bożena Dykiel	5.8 (6,6,5,6)	Andrzej Rybiński - "Nie liczę godzin i lat"
Maria Niklińska	4.5 (4,5,4,5)	Halina Frąckowiak - "Papierowy księżyc"
Maciej Jachowski	5.3 (5,5,5,6)	Lady Pank - "Tacy Sami"
Robert Kudelski	5.3 (6,5,5,5)	Europe - "The Final Countdown"
Daniel Wieleba	3.3 (2,4,3,4)	Shakin Stevens - "Cry Just a Little Bit"
Laura Samojłowicz	5.8 (6,6,5,6)	Eurythmics - "Sweet Dreams"
Aleksandra Nieśpielak	5.3 (5,5,5,6)	Edyta Geppert - "Och, życie, kocham Cię nad życie"
Jacek Borkowski	5.5 (6,5,5,6)	VOX - "Zabiorę Cię Magdaleno"

=== Week 5 ===
Individual judges scores in charts below (given in parentheses) are listed in this order from left to right: Edyta Górniak, Elżbieta Zapendowska, Rudi Schuberth, Mariusz Pudzianowski.

Running order

Star	Score	Song
Krzysztof Hanke	5.9 (6,6,5.5,6)	Trzy Korony - "10 w skali Beauforta"
Samuel Palmer	4.5 (4,4,4,6)	Carl Douglas - "Kung Fu Fighting"
Aleksandra Zienkiewicz	5.8 (6,6,5,6)	Bolesław Mec - "Jej portret"
Bożena Dykiel	5.8 (6,6,5,6)	Halina Frąckowiak - "Bądź gotowy dziś do drogi"
Maria Niklińska	5.3 (6,5,4,6)	Anna Jantar - "Nic nie może wiecznie trwać"
Maciej Jachowski	5.5 (5,6,6,5)	Joe Cocker - "You Are So Beautiful"
Robert Kudelski	5.0 (4,5,5,6)	Halina Kunicka - "Od nocy do nocy"
Laura Samojłowicz	5.5 (6,6,4,6)	Maryla Rodowicz - "Wielka woda"
Aleksandra Nieśpielak	3.8 (2,4,3,6)	Eruption - "One Way Ticket"
Jacek Borkowski	4.6 (4,5,4.5,5)	Zbigniew Wodecki - "Lubię wracać tam, gdzie byłem"
Daniel Wieleba	-	Afric Simone - "Ramaya"

=== Week 6 ===
Individual judges scores in charts below (given in parentheses) are listed in this order from left to right: Edyta Górniak, Elżbieta Zapendowska, Rudi Schuberth, Justyna Steczkowska.

Running order

Star	Score	Song
Krzysztof Hanke	5.6 (5,6,5.5,6)	Wały Jagiellońskie - "Córka rybaka"
Samuel Palmer	5.8 (6,6,5,6)	Rotary - "Na jednej z dzikich plaż"
Aleksandra Zienkiewicz	5.8 (6,6,5,6)	Brathanki - "W kinie, w Lublinie - kochaj mnie!"
Bożena Dykiel	6.0 (6,6,6,6)	Wojciech Młynarski - "Jesteśmy na wczasach"
Maria Niklińska	5.8 (6,6,5,6)	Irena Santor - "Już nie ma dzikich plaż"
Maciej Jachowski	5.8 (6,6,5,6)	VOX - "Szcześliwej drogi już czas"
Robert Kudelski	5.5 (5,6,5,6)	Czesław Niemen - "Sen o Warszawie"
Laura Samojłowicz	5.8 (6,6,5,6)	Krywań - "Szalała, szalała"
Jacek Borkowski	6.0 (6,6,6,6)	Jacek Kaczmarski - "Czerwony autobus"
Aleksandra Nieśpielak	-	Czerwone Gitary - "Płoną góry, płoną lasy"

=== Week 7 ===
Individual judges scores in charts below (given in parentheses) are listed in this order from left to right: Edyta Górniak, Elżbieta Zapendowska, Rudi Schuberth, Marek Starybrat.

Running order

Star	Score	Song
Krzysztof Hanke	4.8 (4,5,5,5)	T.Love - "Chłopaki nie płaczą"
Aleksandra Zienkiewicz	5.8 (6,6,5,6)	Katy Perry - "Hot n Cold"
Bożena Dykiel	5.5 (4,6,6,6)	Kayah & Goran Bregović - "Prawy do lewego"
Maria Niklińska	4.8 (4,5,4,6)	Jennifer Paige - "Crush"
Maciej Jachowski	5.9 (6,6,5.5,6)	Artur Gadowski - "Ona jest ze snu"
Robert Kudelski	5.9 (6,6,5.5,6)	Robbie Williams - "Feel"
Laura Samojłowicz	6.0 (6,6,6,6)	Cher - "Strong Enough"
Jacek Borkowski	4.8 (4,5,5,5)	Elton John - "Sacrifice"
Samuel Palmer	-	Maroon 5 - "This Love"

=== Week 8 ===
Individual judges scores in charts below (given in parentheses) are listed in this order from left to right: Edyta Górniak, Elżbieta Zapendowska, Rudi Schuberth, Łukasz Zagrobelny.

Running order

Star	Score	Song
Krzysztof Hanke duet with Krzysztof Respondek	6.0 (6,6,6,6)	Krzysztof Krawczyk & Goran Bregović - "Mój przyjacielu"
Aleksandra Zienkiewicz duet with Piotr Polk	6.0 (6,6,6,6)	Edyta Górniak & Mieczysław Szcześniak - "Dumka na dwa serca"
Bożena Dykiel duet with Kacper Kuszewski	6.0 (6,6,6,6)	Jan Pietrzak - "Czy te oczy mogą kłamać"
Maria Niklińska duet with Aleksandra Szwed	5.8 (6,6,5,6)	Baccara - "Yes Sir, I Can Boogie"
Maciej Jachowski duet with Patricia Kazadi	6.0 (6,6,6,6)	Bill Medley & Jennifer Warnes - "(I've Had) The Time of My Life"
Robert Kudelski duet with Joanna Jabłczyńska	5.6 (5,6,6,5.5)	Krzysztof Kiljański & Kayah - "Prócz Ciebie nic"
Laura Samojłowicz duet with Artur Chamski	5.9 (6,6,5.5,6)	Jermaine Jackson & Pia Zadora - "When the Rain Begins to Fall"
Jacek Borkowski duet with Agnieszka Włodarczyk	6.0 (6,6,6,6)	Zdzisława Sośnicka & Zbigniew Wodecki - "Z Tobą chcę oglądać świat"

=== Week 9 ===
Individual judges scores in charts below (given in parentheses) are listed in this order from left to right: Edyta Górniak, Elżbieta Zapendowska, Rudi Schuberth, Ryszard Rynkowski.

Running order

Star	Score	Song
Krzysztof Hanke	6.0 (6,6,6,6)	Andrzej Zaucha & Ryszard Rynkowski - "Baby, ach te baby"
Krzysztof Hanke	6.0 (6,6,6,6)	Marino Marini - "Nie płacz, kiedy odjadę" duet with Marco Bocchino
Aleksandra Zienkiewicz	5.5 (5,6,5,6)	Ricchi e Poveri - "Sara perche ti amo" duet with Jakub Tolak
Aleksandra Zienkiewicz	5.9 (6,6,5.5,6)	Ryszrad Rynkowski - "Dary losu"
Bożena Dykiel	5.3 (4,6,5,6)	Ricchi e Poveri - "Mamma Maria" duet with Balanga Italiana
Bożena Dykiel	5.9 (6,6,5.5,6)	Ryszrad Rynkowski - "Wypijmy za błędy"
Maciej Jachowski	6.0 (6,6,6,6)	Ryszrad Rynkowski - "Wznieś serce nad zło"
Maciej Jachowski	6.0 (6,6,6,6)	Zucchero - "Senza una donna" duet with Stefano Terrazzino
Robert Kudelski	5.0 (4,5,5,6)	Ryszard Rynkowski - "Za młodzi za starzy"
Robert Kudelski	6.0 (6,6,6,6)	Zucchero - "Baila morena"
Laura Samojłowicz	6.0 (6,6,6,6)	Toto Cutugno - "Laciate mi cantare" duet with Joanna Trzepiecińska
Laura Samojłowicz	6.0 (6,6,6,6)	Ryszrad Rynkowski - "Nie budźcie marzeń ze snu"

=== Week 10 ===
Individual judges scores in charts below (given in parentheses) are listed in this order from left to right: Edyta Górniak, Elżbieta Zapendowska, Rudi Schuberth, Łukasz Golec.

Running order

Star	Score	Song
Krzysztof Hanke	5.8 (6,6,5,6)	Elvis Presley - "Tutti Frutti"
Krzysztof Hanke	6.0 (6,6,6,6)	Golec uOrkiestra - "Ściernisko"
Aleksandra Zienkiewicz	4.9 (3,5,5.5,6)	Katarzyna Sobczyk - "Trzynastego"
Aleksandra Zienkiewicz	5.3 (5,5,5,6)	Jamelia - "Superstar"
Maciej Jachowski	4.5 (3,5,4,6)	Czesław Niemen - "Płonie stodoła"
Maciej Jachowski	5.5 (6,5,5,6)	Stachursky - "Z każdym twym oddechem"
Robert Kudelski	5.9 (6,6,5.5,6)	Chuck Berry - "Rock and Roll Music"
Robert Kudelski	5.8 (6,6,5,6)	Feel - "Jak anioła głos" duet with Piotr Kupicha
Laura Samojłowicz	5.5 (5,6,5,6)	Elvis Presley - "Hound Dog"
Laura Samojłowicz	6.0 (6,6,6,6)	Alicia Keys - "No One"
Bożena Dykiel	-	Katarzyna Sobczyk - "O mnie się nie martw"

=== Week 11 ===
Individual judges scores in charts below (given in parentheses) are listed in this order from left to right: Edyta Górniak, Elżbieta Zapendowska, Rudi Schuberth, Damian Aleksander.

Running order

Star	Score	Song
Krzysztof Hanke	3.4 (2,4,4,3.5)	"Gdybym był bogaty" from "Fiddler on the Roof"
Aleksandra Zienkiewicz	4.1 (3,5,4,4.5)	"Don't Cry For Me Argentina" from "Evita"
Maciej Jachowski	4.8 (4,5,5,5)	"Fame" from "Fame"
Robert Kudelski	5.8 (6,6,5.5,5.5)	Queen - "The Show Must Go On"
Laura Samojłowicz	5.5 (5,6,5,6)	"Aquarius" from "Hair"

Individual judges scores in charts below (given in parentheses) are listed in this order from left to right: Edyta Górniak, Elżbieta Zapendowska, Rudi Schuberth, Beata Kozidrak.

Running order

Star	Score	Song
Aleksandra Zienkiewicz	5.8 (6,6,5,6)	Bajm - "Płynie w nas gorąca krew"
Maciej Jachowski	5.8 (6,6,5,6)	Bajm - "Biała Armia"
Robert Kudelski	5.8 (6,6,5,6)	Bajm - "Co mi, Panie, dasz?"
Laura Samojłowicz	5.9 (6,6,5.5,6)	Bajm - "Szklanka wody"

=== Week 12 ===
Individual judges scores in charts below (given in parentheses) are listed in this order from left to right: Edyta Górniak, Elżbieta Zapendowska, Rudi Schuberth.

Running order

Star	Score	Song
Aleksandra Zienkiewicz	5.5 (6,6,4.5)	Patrycja Markowska - "Świat się pomylił" duet with Patrycja Markowska
Robert Kudelski	5.0 (4,6,5)	PIN - "Niekochanie" duet with Andrzej Lampert
Robert Kudelski	6.0 (6,6,6)	Tarkan - "Simarik (Kiss Kiss)"
Maciej Jachowski	6.0 (6,6,6)	Kasia Cerekwicka - "S.O.S." duet with Kasia Cerekwicka
Maciej Jachowski	6.0 (6,6,6)	Grażyna Łobaszewska - "Czas nas uczy pogody"
Maciej Jachowski	6.0 (6,6,6)	Foreigner - "I Want To Know What Love Is"
Laura Samojłowicz	5.7 (6,6,5)	Bracia - "Jeszcze raz" duet with Piotr Cugowski
Laura Samojłowicz	6.0 (6,6,6)	Meat Loaf - "I'd Do Anything For Love"
Laura Samojłowicz	6.0 (6,6,6)	Guns N' Roses - "Knockin' On Heaven's Door"
Laura Samojłowicz	-	"Będę twoja"

Another Songs

Star	Song
Andrzej Deskur	Ivan & Delfin - "Czarne oczy"
Marcin Kwaśny	Wilki - "Baśka"
Katarzyna Żak	Danuta Rinn - "Gdzie Ci Mężczyźni?"
Daniel Wieleba	Sokół & Pono - "W Aucie"
Aleksandra Nieśpielak	Kayah - "Supermenka"
Samuel Palmer	Andrzej Rosiewicz - "Najwięcej witaminy"
Jacek Borkowski	Jerzy Połomski - "Bo z dziewczynami"
Maria Niklińska	Alicja Majewska - "Być kobietą"
Bożena Dykiel	Kasia Klich - "Lepszy model"
Krzysztof Hanke	Czarno-Czarni - "Nogi"

== Song Chart ==
Star	Week 1	Week 2	Week 3	Week 4	Week 5	Week 6	Week 7	Week 8	Week 9		Week 10		Week 11		Week 12 Final			
Lauar Samojłowicz	Hafanana	In your eyes	I love you	Sweet dreams	Wielka woda	Hej, szalała, szalała	Strong enough	When the rain begins to fall	Laciate mi cantare	Nie budzcie marzeń ze snu	Hound dog	No one	Aquarius	Szklanka wody	Jeszcze raz	I would do anything for love	Knockin' on heaven's door	Będę twoja
Maciej Jachowski	King Bruce Lee, karate mistrz	What is love?	You	Tacy sami	You're so beautiful	Szczęśliwej drogi już czas	Ona jest ze snu	The time of my life	Senza una donna	Wznieś serce nad zło	Płonąca stodoła	Z każdym twym oddechem	Fame	Biała armia	S.O.S.	Czas nas uczy pogody	I want to know, what love is	
Robert Kudelski	Gitan	Bailamos	Et si tu n'existais pas	The final countdown	Od nocy do nocy	Sen o warszawie	Feel	Prócz ciebie nic	Baila	Za młodzi, za starzy	Rock n roll music	Jak anioła głos	The show mus go on	Co mi, Panie, dasz?	Niekochanie	Şımarık		
Aleksandra Zienkiewicz	Chałupy	S.O.S.	Listen to your heart	Nie ma wody na pustyni	Jej portret	W kinie w Lublinie	Hot n cold	Dumka na dwa serca	Sara perche ti amo	Dary losu	Trzynastego	Superstar	Don't cry for me, Argentina	Płynie w nas gorąca krew	Świat się pomylił			
Krzysztof Hanke	Biełyje rozy	Macho	Do zakochania jeden krok	O, Ela	10 w skali Beauforta	Córko rybaka	Chłopaki nie płaczą	Mój przyjacielu	Nie płacz, kiedy odjadę	Baby, ach te baby!	Tutti frutti	Ściernisko	Gdybym był bogaty					
Bożena Dykiel	Kuba, wyspa jak wulkan gorąca	Bierz co chcesz	Takie tango	Nie liczę godzin i lat	Bądź gotowy dziś do drogi	Jesteśmy na wczasach w tych góralskich lasach	Prawy do lewego	Czy te oczy mogą kłamać?	Mamma Maria	Wypijmy za błędy	O mnie się nie martw							
Maria Niklińska	La isla Bonita	Can't take my eyes of you	Lovefool	Papierowy księżyc	Nic nie może wiecznie trwać	Już nie ma dzikich plaż	Crush	Yes sir, I can boogie										
Jacek Borkowski	New York, New York	Sex bomb	She	Zabiorę cię, Magdaleno	Lubię wracać tam, gdzie byłem	Czerwony autobus	Sacrifice	Z tobą chcę oglądać świat										
Samuel Palmer	Copacabana	Wake me up before you go	Kołysanka dla nieznajomej	Never ending story	Kung fu fighting	Na jednej z dzikich plaż	This love											
Aleksandra Nieśpielak	Nah neh nah	Please, don't stop the music	Promise me	Och, życie, kocham cię nad życie	One way ticket	Płoną góry, płoną lasy												
Daniel Wieleba	Comment ca va?	Kobiety są gorące	Bo jo cię kochom	Cry just a little bit	Ramaya													
Katarzyna Żak	My Cyganie	You're my heart, you're my soul	When I need you															
Marcin Kwaśny	Cancion del Mariachi	Jesteś szalona																
Andrzej Deskur	Corazon espinado	A wszystko to, bo ciebie kocham																

Not scored
Highest scoring dance
Lowest scoring dance

== Rating Figures ==
Episode	Date	Official rating 4+	Share 4+	Share 16–39
1	March 7, 2009	3 574 107	24,29%	20,15%
2	March 14, 2009	3 455 327	22,74%	20,01%
3	March 21, 2009	3 217 357	21,78%	18,62%
4	March 28, 2009	3 365 570	22,47%	19,37%
5	April 4, 2009	2 930 012	20,62%	16,29%
6	April 11, 2009	2 462 815	17,18%	14,26%
7	April 18, 2009	2 958 539	20,99%	18,01%
8	April 25, 2009	3 122 794	23,95%	21,71%
9	May 2, 2009	2 762 761	21,42%	17,78%
10	May 9, 2009	2 601 118	21,13%	17,34%
11	May 16, 2009	2 966 945	21,46%	17,94%
12	May 23, 2009	3 338 217	26,24%	21,82%
Average	–	3 077 198	22,09%	18,66%
