= Taniec z gwiazdami season 12 =

Taniec z gwiazdami
- Season 12
- Hosted by: Piotr Gąsowski; Katarzyna Skrzynecka
- Judges: Iwona Pavlović; Piotr Galiński; Beata Tyszkiewicz; Zbigniew Wodecki
- Celebrity winner: Monika Pyrek
- Professional winner: Robert Rowiński
- No. of episodes: 13

Release
- Original network: TVN
- Original release: 5 September – 28 November 2010

Season chronology
- ← Previous; 11 Next → 13

The 12th season of Taniec z Gwiazdami, the Polish edition of Dancing With the Stars, started on 5 September 2010 and ended on 28 November 2010. It was broadcast by TVN. Katarzyna Skrzynecka and Piotr Gąsowski continued as the hosts, and the judges were: Iwona Szymańska-Pavlović, Zbigniew Wodecki, Beata Tyszkiewicz and Piotr Galiński.

On 28 November, Monika Pyrek and her partner Robert Rowiński were crowned the champions.

== Couples ==
| Celebrity | Occupation | Professional partner | Status |
|---|---|---|---|
| Maciej Jachowski | M jak miłość and Na Wspólnej actor | Janja Lesar | Eliminated 1st on 5 September 2010 |
| Agnieszka Jaskółka | Psy actress and model | Rafał Maserak | Eliminated 2nd on 12 September 2010 |
| Robert Korzeniowski | Olympic racewalker | Anna Głogowska | Eliminated 3rd on 19 September 2010 |
| Anna Kalata | Former Minister of Labour and Social Policy | Krzysztof Hulboj | Eliminated 4th on 26 September 2010 |
| Marcin Kwaśny | Film and television actor | Nina Tyrka | Eliminated 5th on 3 October 2010 |
| Andrzej Deskur | Majka actor | Katarzyna Krupa | Eliminated 6th on 10 October 2010 |
| Andrzej Młynarczyk | M jak miłość actor | Blanka Winiarska | Eliminated 7th on 17 October 2010 |
| Dorota Zawadzka | Superniania host | Cezary Olszewski † | Eliminated 8th on 24 October 2010 |
| Maria Niklińska | Actress and singer | Tomasz Barański | Eliminated 9th on 31 October 2010 |
| Andrzej Gołota | Olympic boxer | Magdalena Soszyńska-Michno | Eliminated 10th on 7 November 2010 |
| Patricia Kazadi | Actress and singer | Łukasz Czarnecki | Eliminated 11th on 14 November 2010 |
| Edyta Górniak | Singer & Eurovision 1994 runner-up | Jan Kliment | Third place on 21 November 2010 |
| Paweł Staliński | Model | Izabela Janachowska; Anna Głogowska (Week 10) | Second place on 28 November 2010 |
| Monika Pyrek | Olympic vaulter | Robert Rowiński; Krzysztof Hulboj (Week 12) | Winners on 28 November 2010 |

== Scores ==
| Couple | Place | 1 | 2 | 3 | 4 | 5 | 6 | 7 | 8 | 9 | 10 | 11 | 12 | 13 |
|---|---|---|---|---|---|---|---|---|---|---|---|---|---|---|
| Monika & Robert | 1 | - | 35 | 36 | 35 | 36 | 32 | 40† | 37 | 40† | 37+36=73 | 32+40=72‡ | 36+40=76 | 40+40+40=120 |
| Paweł & Izabela | 2 | 36 | - | 32 | 39 | 38 | 37 | 40† | 35 | 39 | 29+37=66 | 38+40=78 | 40+34=74‡ | 40+40+40=120 |
| Edyta & Jan | 3 | - | 34 | 39 | 35 | 40† | 35 | 39 | 40† | 40† | 33+39=72 | 34+40=74 | 37+40=77† | |
| Patricia & Łukasz | 4 | - | 38† | 40† | 40† | 33 | 40† | 40† | 40† | 33 | 38+40=78† | 40+40=80† | | |
| Andrzej & Magdalena | 5 | 30 | - | 28 | 25 | 25 | 22 | 38 | 21‡ | 28‡ | 27+35=62‡ | | | |
| Maria & Tomasz | 6 | - | 27 | 36 | 38 | 40† | 39 | 39 | 40† | 36 | | | | |
| Dorota & Cezary | 7 | - | 32 | 30 | 28 | 24‡ | 18‡ | 24‡ | 29 | | | | | |
| Andrzej & Blanka | 8 | 33 | - | 29 | 30 | 32 | 25 | 37 | | | | | | |
| Andrzej & Katarzyna | 9 | 37† | - | 29 | 36 | 26 | 28 | | | | | | | |
| Marcin & Nina | 10 | 28‡ | - | 19‡ | 27 | 29 | | | | | | | | |
| Anna & Krzysztof | 11 | - | 20‡ | 23 | 20‡ | | | | | | | | | |
| Robert & Anna | 12 | 33 | - | 23 | | | | | | | | | | |
| Agnieszka & Rafał | 13 | - | 23 | | | | | | | | | | | |
| Maciej & Janja | 14 | 32 | | | | | | | | | | | | |

Red numbers indicate the lowest score for each week.
Green numbers indicate the highest score for each week.
indicates the couple eliminated that week.
indicates the returning couple that finished in the bottom two.
indicates the winning couple of the week.
indicates the runner-up of the week.
indicates the third place couple of the week.

Notes:

Week 1: Andrzej Deskur scored 37 out of 40 on his first dance (Waltz). It was the second highest score ever in Week 1, the actual record belongs to Natasza Urbańska who scored 38 on her Cha Cha Cha in Week 1 of Season 10. Marcin Kwaśny got 28 points for his Waltz, making it the lowest score of the week. Maciej & Janja were eliminated despite being 4 points from the bottom.

Week 2: Patricia Kazadi scored 38 out of 40 on her first dance (Rumba). It was the second highest score ever in Week 2, the actual record belongs to Katarzyna Glinka who scored 39 on her Quickstep in Week 2 of Season 11. Anna Kalata got 20 points for her Rumba, making it the lowest score of the week. Agnieszka & Rafał were eliminated despite being 3 points from the bottom.

Week 3: Patricia Kazadi received the first perfect score of the season for her Tango. Marcin Kwaśny got 19 points for his Tango, making it the lowest score of the week. Robert & Anna were eliminated despite being 4 points from the bottom.

Week 4: Patricia Kazadi received her second perfect score for the Paso Doble. Anna Kalata got 20 points for her Paso Doble, making it the lowest score of the week. Anna & Krzysztof were eliminated.

Week 5: Edyta Górniak and Maria Niklińska got their first perfect scores. Dorota Zawadzka got 24 points for her Samba, making it the lowest score of the week. Marcin & Nina were eliminated despite being 5 points from the bottom.

Week 6: Patricia Kazadi received her third perfect score for the Salsa. Dorota Zawadzka got 18 points for her Waltz in American Smooth, making it the lowest score of the week. Andrzej & Katarzyna were eliminated despite being 10 points from the bottom.

Week 7: All couples danced to songs from Polish comedy movies. Monika Pyrek and Paweł Staliński got their first perfect scores. Patricia Kazadi received her 4th perfect score for the Quickstep. There was a three-way tie on the first place, with Monika Pyrek, Paweł Staliński and Patricia Kazadi all getting perfect scores. There was also a two-way tie on the second place, with Edyta Górniak and Maria Niklińska all getting 39 out of 40. Dorota Zawadzka got 24 points for her Cha-cha-cha, making it the lowest score of the week. Dorota & Cezary were on the bottom of the leaderboard for the third consecutive week. Andrzej & Blanka were eliminated despite being 13 points from the bottom.

Week 8: All couples danced to songs from love movies. Maria Niklińska and Edyta Górniak received their second perfect scores. Patricia Kazadi received her 5th perfect score for the Cha-cha-cha, having scored three perfect scores in a row. Andrzej Gołota got 21 points for his Rumba, making it the lowest score of the week. Dorota & Cezary were eliminated despite being 8 points from the bottom.

Week 9: All couples danced to the most famous songs of Anna Jantar. Monika Pyrek received her second perfect score for the Tango and Edyta Górniak received her third perfect score for the Samba. Andrzej Gołota got 28 points for his Tango, making it the lowest score of the week. Maria & Tomasz were eliminated despite being 8 points from the bottom.

Week 10: Patricia Kazadi received her 6th perfect score for the Rumba. Andrzej Gołota got 27 points for his Cha-cha-cha and 35 points for his Waltz, making it the lowest score of the week. Andrzej & Magdalena were on the bottom of the leaderboard for the third consecutive week. Andrzej & Magdalena were eliminated.

Week 11: Patricia Kazadi got two perfect scores for her Paso Doble and Foxtrot. Paweł Staliński received his second perfect score for the Viennese Waltz, Monika Pyrek received her third perfect score for the Viennese Waltz and Edyta Górniak received her 4th perfect score for the Rumba. Patricia & Łukasz were eliminated despite receiving perfect scores.

Week 12: Monika Pyrek, Edyta Górniak and Paweł Staliński received perfect score for the Argentine Tango. Edyta & Jan were eliminated despite topping the leaderboard.

Week 13: Both Monika Pyrek and Paweł Staliński got 120 out of 120 points, making it the 4th-season finale in a row with both couples getting the highest possible score. Both couples had to perform three dances: their favorite Latin dance, their favorite Ballroom dance and a Freestyle. Monika Pyrek won the competition, having cast 55.35 percent of the votes. This is the second time the season's winner was on the 4th place on the judges' general scoreboard and the 6th time the winner was not on the first place according to the judges' scoreboard.

== Average scores ==
| Rank by average | Place | Couple | Average | Total | Best Score | Worst Score |
|---|---|---|---|---|---|---|
| 1. | 4. | Patricia Kazadi & Łukasz Czarnecki | 38.5 | 462 | 40 | 33 |
| 2. | 3. | Edyta Górniak & Jan Kliment | 37.5 | 525 | 40 | 33 |
| 3. | 2. | Paweł Staliński & Izabela Janachowska | 37.3 | 634 | 40 | 29 |
| 4. | 1. | Monika Pyrek & Robert Rowiński | 37.2 | 632 | 40 | 32 |
| 5. | 6. | Maria Niklińska & Tomasz Barański | 36.9 | 295 | 40 | 27 |
| 6. | 14. | Maciej Jachowski & Janja Lesar | 32.0 | 32 | 32 | 32 |
| 7. | 9. | Andrzej Deskur & Katarzyna Krupa | 31.2 | 156 | 37 | 26 |
| 8. | 8. | Andrzej Młynarczyk & Blanka Winiarska | 31.0 | 186 | 37 | 25 |
| 9. | 12. | Robert Korzeniowski & Anna Głogowska | 28.0 | 56 | 33 | 23 |
| 10. | 5. | Andrzej Gołota & Magdalena Soszyńska-Michno | 27.9 | 279 | 38 | 21 |
| 11. | 7. | Dorota Zawadzka & Cezary Olszewski | 26.4 | 185 | 32 | 18 |
| 12. | 10. | Marcin Kwaśny & Nina Tyrka | 25.8 | 103 | 29 | 19 |
| 13. | 13. | Agnieszka Jaskółka & Rafał Maserak | 23.0 | 23 | 23 | 23 |
| 14. | 11. | Anna Kalata & Krzysztof Hulboj | 21.0 | 63 | 23 | 20 |
| All couples | | | 34 | 3631 | | |

== Couples' highest and lowest scoring dances ==
| Couples | Average Score | Best Dances | Worst Dances |
|---|---|---|---|
| Patricia & Łukasz | 38.5 | Tango, Paso Doble (twice), Salsa, Quickstep, Cha-Cha-Cha, Rumba, Foxtrot (40) | Viennese Waltz, Jive (33) |
| Edyta & Jan | 37.5 | Viennese Waltz, Waltz, Samba, Rumba, Argentine Tango (40) | Foxtrot (33) |
| Paweł & Izabela | 37.3 | Rumba, Viennese Waltz (twice), Argentine Tango, Paso Doble, Freestyle (40) | Jive (29) |
| Monika & Robert | 37.2 | Cha-Cha-Cha (twice), Tango (twice), Viennese Waltz, Argentine Tango, Freestyle (40) | Waltz in American Smooth, Jive (32) |
| Maria & Tomasz | 36.9 | Samba, Tango (40) | Quickstep (27) |
| Maciej & Janja | 32.0 | Cha-Cha-Cha (32) | Cha-Cha-Cha (32) |
| Andrzej & Katarzyna | 31.2 | Waltz (37) | Samba (26) |
| Andrzej & Blanka | 31.0 | Foxtrot (37) | Salsa (25) |
| Robert & Anna | 28.0 | Waltz (33) | Jive (23) |
| Andrzej & Magdalena | 27.9 | Quickstep (38) | Rumba (21) |
| Dorota & Cezary | 26.4 | Quickstep (32) | Waltz in American Smooth (18) |
| Marcin & Nina | 25.8 | Viennese Waltz (29) | Tango (19) |
| Agnieszka & Rafał | 23.0 | Rumba (23) | Rumba (23) |
| Anna & Krzysztof | 21.0 | Tango (23) | Rumba, Paso Doble (20) |

== Highest and lowest scoring performances ==
The best and worst performances in each dance according to the judges' marks are as follows:

| Dance | Best dancer | Best score | Worst dancer | Worst score |
|---|---|---|---|---|
| Cha-Cha-Cha | Monika Pyrek; Patricia Kazadi | 40 | Dorota Zawadzka | 24 |
| Waltz | Edyta Górniak | 40 | Marcin Kwaśny | 28 |
| Quickstep | Patricia Kazadi | 40 | Maria Niklińska | 27 |
| Rumba | Paweł Staliński; Patricia Kazadi; Edyta Górniak | 40 | Anna Kalata | 20 |
| Jive | Edyta Górniak | 39 | Robert Korzeniowski | 23 |
| Tango | Patricia Kazadi; Maria Niklińska; Monika Pyrek | 40 | Marcin Kwaśny | 19 |
| Foxtrot | Patricia Kazadi | 40 | Andrzej Gołota | 25 |
| Paso Doble | Patricia Kazadi; Paweł Staliński | 40 | Anna Kalata | 20 |
| Samba | Maria Niklińska; Edyta Górniak | 40 | Dorota Zawadzka | 24 |
| Viennese Waltz | Edyta Górniak; Paweł Staliński; Monika Pyrek | 40 | Andrzej Gołota | 25 |
| Salsa | Patricia Kazadi | 40 | Andrzej Gołota | 22 |
| Waltz in American Smooth | Maria Niklińska | 39 | Dorota Zawadzka | 18 |
| Quickstep in American Smooth | Andrzej Deskur | 28 | | |
| Foxtrot in American Smooth | Paweł Staliński | 37 | | |
| Argentine Tango | Paweł Staliński; Monika Pyrek; Edyta Górniak | 40 | | |
| Freestyle | Paweł Staliński; Monika Pyrek | 40 | | |

== Episodes ==
Individual judges scores in charts below (given in parentheses) are listed in this order from left to right: Iwona Szymańska-Pavlović, Zbigniew Wodecki, Beata Tyszkiewicz and Piotr Galiński.

=== Week 1 ===
Running order

| Couple | Score | Style | Music |
|---|---|---|---|
| Andrzej & Magdalena | 30 (6,8,9,7) | Waltz | "What The World Needs Now Is Love" — Jackie DeShannon |
| Paweł & Izabela | 36 (8,9,10,9) | Cha-Cha-Cha | "Addicted to Love" – Robert Palmer |
| Andrzej & Katarzyna | 37 (8,9,10,10) | Waltz | "Three Times a Lady" – Commodores |
| Maciej & Janja | 32 (6,9,9,8) | Cha-Cha-Cha | "Marcia Baila" – Les Rita Mitsouko |
| Marcin & Nina | 28 (5,8,9,6) | Waltz | "Dumka na dwa serca" – Edyta Górniak & Mieczysław Szcześniak |
| Andrzej & Blanka | 33 (7,9,9,8) | Cha-Cha-Cha | "You're the First, the Last, My Everything" – Barry White |
| Robert & Anna | 33 (7,8,10,8) | Waltz | "Against All Odds (Take a Look at Me Now)" – Phil Collins |
| Maria & Tomasz; Anna & Krzysztof; Monika & Robert; Agnieszka & Rafał; Dorota & Cezary; Patricia & Łukasz; Edyta & Jan | N/A | Group Salsa | The song from Honeymoon |

=== Week 2 ===
Running order

| Couple | Score | Style | Music |
|---|---|---|---|
| Maria & Tomasz | 27 (5,8,9,5) | Quickstep | "Billy-A-Dick" – Bette Midler |
| Anna & Krzysztof | 20 (3,7,8,2) | Rumba | "I Don't Wanna Lose You" – Tina Turner |
| Monika & Robert | 35 (8,8,10,9) | Quickstep | "Lemon Tree" – Fool's Garden |
| Agnieszka & Rafał | 23 (4,7,9,3) | Rumba | "Can't Stop Loving You" – Phil Collins |
| Dorota & Cezary | 32 (7,8,10,7) | Quickstep | "Mrs. Robinson" – Simon & Garfunkel |
| Patricia & Łukasz | 38 (9,9,10,10) | Rumba | "Crush" – Jennifer Paige |
| Edyta & Jan | 34 (7,10,10,7) | Quickstep | "Diamonds Are a Girl's Best Friend" — Marilyn Monroe |
| Andrzej & Magdalena; Paweł & Izabela; Andrzej & Katarzyna; Marcin & Nina; Andrzej & Blanka; Robert & Anna | N/A | Group Swing | "Mercy" – Duffy |

=== Week 3 ===
Running order

| Couple | Score | Style | Music |
|---|---|---|---|
| Paweł & Izabela | 32 (7,9,9,7) | Tango | "Summer Wine" – Lee Hazlewood & Nancy Sinatra |
| Monika & Robert | 36 (8,9,10,9) | Jive | "Maneater" – Hall & Oates |
| Marcin & Nina | 19 (2,7,8,2) | Tango | "Für Elise" – Ludwig van Beethoven |
| Maria & Tomasz | 36 (8,9,10,9) | Jive | "Would You...?" – Touch and Go |
| Andrzej & Blanka | 29 (6,8,9,6) | Tango | "Enjoy the Silence" – Depeche Mode |
| Andrzej & Magdalena | 28 (5,8,10,5) | Jive | "I'm Still Standing" – Elton John |
| Anna & Krzysztof | 23 (4,8,8,3) | Tango | "Tango Notturno" – Hans-Otto Borgmann |
| Andrzej & Katarzyna | 29 (5,9,10,5) | Jive | "Porque te vas" – Jeanette |
| Patricia & Łukasz | 40 (10,10,10,10) | Tango | "Capriccioso" – Joe Loss |
| Robert & Anna | 23 (3,7,9,4) | Jive | "Part-Time Lover" – Stevie Wonder |
| Edyta & Jan | 39 (9,10,10,10) | Tango | "El Tango de Roxanne" from Moulin Rouge! |
| Dorota & Cezary | 30 (6,9,9,6) | Jive | "Why Do Fools Fall in Love" – Frankie Lymon & The Teenagers |

=== Week 4 ===
Running order

| Couple | Score | Style | Music |
|---|---|---|---|
| Andrzej & Blanka | 30 (6,8,9,7) | Paso Doble | "Ayo Mi Son" — Legin Resel |
| Andrzej & Katarzyna | 36 (8,10,10,8) | Foxtrot | "The Pink Panther Theme" – Henry Mancini |
| Anna & Krzysztof | 20 (3,7,8,2) | Paso Doble | "Baila Torero" – Orquesta del Tendido |
| Monika & Robert | 35 (8,9,9,9) | Foxtrot | "Blue Velvet" – Bernie Wayne & Lee Morris |
| Paweł & Izabela | 39 (10,9,10,10) | Paso Doble | "La Campanera" – Aniceto Molina |
| Maria & Tomasz | 38 (9,10,10,9) | Foxtrot | "Dolce Vita" – Ryan Paris |
| Marcin & Nina | 27 (5,8,9,5) | Paso Doble | "El Gato Montes" — Manuel Penella |
| Dorota & Cezary | 28 (5,8,9,6) | Foxtrot | "Always Look on the Bright Side of Life" – Monty Python |
| Edyta & Jan | 35 (8,9,10,8) | Paso Doble | "Paso Royale" – Engelbert Humperdinck |
| Andrzej & Magdalena | 25 (4,8,9,4) | Foxtrot | "Love and Marriage" – Frank Sinatra |
| Patricia & Łukasz | 40 (10,10,10,10) | Paso Doble | "Malagueña" – Ernesto Lecuona |

=== Week 5 ===
Running order

| Couple | Score | Style | Music |
|---|---|---|---|
| Marcin & Nina | 29 (6,8,9,6) | Viennese Waltz | "Breakaway" – Kelly Clarkson |
| Dorota & Cezary | 24 (4,7,8,5) | Samba | "La Bamba" – Ritchie Valens |
| Andrzej & Blanka | 32 (7,8,9,8) | Viennese Waltz | "Back in 1876" – Rolfe Kent |
| Andrzej & Katarzyna | 26 (4,8,9,5) | Samba | "Bamboléo" – Gipsy Kings |
| Andrzej & Magdalena | 25 (5,8,8,4) | Viennese Waltz | "Secondo Waltz" – Dmitri Shostakovich |
| Monika & Robert | 36 (8,9,10,9) | Samba | "Bailamos" – Enrique Iglesias |
| Patricia & Łukasz | 33 (7,9,9,8) | Viennese Waltz | "Have You Ever Really Loved a Woman?" – Bryan Adams |
| Maria & Tomasz | 40 (10,10,10,10) | Samba | "Si Ya Se Acabó" – Jennifer Lopez |
| Edyta & Jan | 40 (10,10,10,10) | Viennese Waltz | "Wspomnienie" – Czesław Niemen |
| Paweł & Izabela | 38 (9,10,10,9) | Samba | "Ain't It Funny" – Jennifer Lopez |

=== Week 6 ===
Running order

| Couple | Score | Style | Music |
|---|---|---|---|
| Monika & Robert | 32 (7,9,9,7) | Waltz in American Smooth | "Just the Way You Are" – Billy Joel |
| Paweł & Izabela | 37 (9,10,10,8) | Foxtrot in American Smooth | "The Way You Make Me Feel" – Michael Jackson |
| Andrzej & Blanka | 25 (4,8,9,4) | Salsa | "Vehicle" – The Ides of March |
| Dorota & Cezary | 18 (2,7,8,1) | Waltz in American Smooth | "Could I Have This Dance" – Anne Murray |
| Andrzej & Magdalena | 22 (4,8,8,2) | Salsa | "Salsa Italiana" – El Rubio Loco |
| Andrzej & Katarzyna | 28 (6,9,10,3) | Quickstep in American Smooth | "The Dirty Boogie" – The Brian Setzer Orchestra |
| Edyta & Jan | 35 (8,9,10,8) | Salsa | "La Vida Es Un Carnaval" – Celia Cruz |
| Maria & Tomasz | 39 (9,10,10,10) | Waltz in American Smooth | "Come Away with Me" – Norah Jones |
| Patricia & Łukasz | 40 (10,10,10,10) | Salsa | "Yo No Se Mañana" – Luis Enrique |

=== Week 7: Polish Comedies Theme Week ===
Running order

| Couple | Score | Style | Music | Movie |
|---|---|---|---|---|
| Dorota & Cezary | 24 (4,8,8,4) | Cha-Cha-Cha | "Motylem jestem" – Irena Jarocka | Czterdziestolatek |
| Maria & Tomasz | 39 (9,10,10,10) | Rumba | "Historia jednej znajomości" – Czerwone Gitary | Rejs |
| Patricia & Łukasz | 40 (10,10,10,10) | Quickstep | "Vabank" – Henryk Kuźniak | Vabank |
| Monika & Robert | 40 (10,10,10,10) | Cha-Cha-Cha | "Baw mnie" – Seweryn Krajewski | Och, Karol |
| Andrzej & Blanka | 37 (8,10,10,9) | Foxtrot | "Czterdzieści lat minęło" – Andrzej Rosiewicz | Czterdziestolatek |
| Paweł & Izabela | 40 (10,10,10,10) | Rumba | "Zmysły precz" – Anna Jurksztowicz | Kingsajz |
| Andrzej & Magdalena | 38 (10,10,10,8) | Quickstep | "Co ty tutaj robisz" – Elektryczne gitary | Kiler |
| Edyta & Jan | 39 (9,10,10,10) | Jive | "Chłopaki nie płaczą" – T.Love | Chłopaki nie płaczą |

=== Week 8: Movies Theme Week ===
Running order

| Couple | Score | Style | Music | Movie |
|---|---|---|---|---|
| Paweł & Izabela | 35 (8,9,10,8) | Waltz | "I Will Always Love You" – Whitney Houston | The Bodyguard |
| Monika & Robert | 37 (7,10,10,10) | Rumba | "(Where Do I Begin?) Love Story" – Francis Lai | Love Story |
| Dorota & Cezary | 29 (6,9,9,5) | Viennese Waltz | "When a Man Loves a Woman" – Percy Sledge | When a Man Loves a Woman |
| Andrzej & Magdalena | 21 (3,8,8,2) | Rumba | "When You Say Nothing at All" – Ronan Keating | Notting Hill |
| Edyta & Jan | 40 (10,10,10,10) | Waltz | "Angel" – Sarah McLachlan | City of Angels |
| Patricia & Łukasz | 40 (10,10,10,10) | Cha-Cha-Cha | "Oh, Pretty Woman" – Roy Orbison | Pretty Woman |
| Maria & Tomasz | 40 (10,10,10,10) | Tango | "The Phantom of the Opera" – Emmy Rossum & Gerard Butler | The Phantom of the Opera |

=== Week 9: Anna Jantar Week ===
Running order

| Couple | Score | Style | Music |
|---|---|---|---|
| Patricia & Łukasz | 33 (7,9,9,8) | Jive | "Co ja w tobie widziałam" – Anna Jantar |
| Andrzej & Magdalena | 28 (5,9,9,5) | Tango | "Nic nie może wiecznie trwać" – Anna Jantar |
| Maria & Tomasz | 36 (8,10,10,8) | Cha-Cha-Cha | "Mój, tylko mój" – Anna Jantar |
| Paweł & Izabela | 39 (9,10,10,10) | Quickstep | "Najtrudniejszy pierwszy krok" – Anna Jantar |
| Edyta & Jan | 40 (10,10,10,10) | Samba | "Tyle słońca w całym mieście" – Anna Jantar |
| Monika & Robert | 40 (10,10,10,10) | Tango | "Nie wierz mi, nie ufaj mi" – Anna Jantar |
| Patricia & Łukasz; Andrzej & Magdalena; Maria & Tomasz; Paweł & Izabela; Edyta & Jan; Monika & Robert | N/A | Group Viennese Waltz | "Moje jedyne marzenie" – Anna Jantar |

=== Week 10 ===
Running order

| Couple | Score | Style | Music |
|---|---|---|---|
| Monika & Robert | 37 (9,9,10,9) | Salsa | "Demasiado Corazon" – Willy DeVille |
| Monika & Robert | 36 (8,10,10,8) | Quickstep | "We No Speak Americano" – Yolanda Be Cool & DCUP |
| Patricia & Łukasz | 38 (9,10,10,9) | Waltz | "Amazing Grace" – John Newton |
| Patricia & Łukasz | 40 (10,10,10,10) | Rumba | "Love's Divine" – Seal |
| Paweł & Anna* | 29 (5,8,9,7) | Jive | "We Didn't Start the Fire" – Billy Joel |
| Paweł & Anna* | 37 (8,10,10,9) | Tango | "Parachute" – Cheryl Cole |
| Andrzej & Magdalena | 27 (4,10,10,3) | Cha-Cha-Cha | "Sweet Like Cola" – Lou Bega |
| Andrzej & Magdalena | 35 (7,10,10,8) | Waltz | "Georgia on My Mind" – Ray Charles |
| Edyta & Jan | 33 (6,10,10,7) | Foxtrot | "Manhattan" – Ella Fitzgerald |
| Edyta & Jan | 39 (9,10,10,10) | Salsa | "La Luz del Ritmo" – Los Fabulosos Cadillacs |

*Due to injury, Izabela was unable to dance this week.

=== Week 11 ===
Running order

| Couple | Score | Style | Music |
|---|---|---|---|
| Edyta & Jan | 34 (7,9,10,8) | Quickstep | "Jožin z bažin" – Ivan Mládek |
| Edyta & Jan | 40 (10,10,10,10) | Rumba | "Liberian Girl" – Michael Jackson |
| Paweł & Izabela | 38 (9,10,10,9) | Cha-Cha-Cha | "Carino" – Jennifer Lopez |
| Paweł & Izabela | 40 (10,10,10,10) | Viennese Waltz | "On the Hills of Manchuria" – Ilya Shatrov |
| Patricia & Łukasz | 40 (10,10,10,10) | Paso Doble | "Pride (In the Name of Love)" – U2 |
| Patricia & Łukasz | 40 (10,10,10,10) | Foxtrot | "I Won't Dance" – Jerome Kern |
| Monika & Robert | 32 (6,9,10,7) | Jive | "Hey Boy (Get Your Ass Up)" – Blog 27 |
| Monika & Robert | 40 (10,10,10,10) | Viennese Waltz | "Where the Wild Roses Grow" – Nick Cave and the Bad Seeds & Kylie Minogue |

=== Week 12 ===
Running order

| Couple | Score | Style | Music |
|---|---|---|---|
| Monika & Krzysztof* | 36 (8,9,10,9) | Paso Doble | "Bad Romance" – Lady Gaga |
| Monika & Krzysztof* | 40 (10,10,10,10) | Argentine Tango | "Sensuel" – Carlos Ortega |
| Paweł & Izabela | 40 (10,10,10,10) | Argentine Tango | "A La Gran Muñeca" – Carlos di Sarli |
| Paweł & Izabela | 34 (7,9,10,8) | Salsa | "Coge la Botella" — Yumurí |
| Edyta & Jan | 37 (9,9,10,9) | Cha-Cha-Cha | "Sway" – Dean Martin |
| Edyta & Jan | 40 (10,10,10,10) | Argentine Tango | "Tango De Los Asesinos" – John Powell |

*Due to injury, Robert was unable to dance this week.

=== Week 13: Final ===
Running order

| Couple | Score | Style | Music |
|---|---|---|---|
| Paweł & Izabela | 40 (10,10,10,10) | Paso Doble | "La Campanera" – Aniceto Molina |
| Paweł & Izabela | 40 (10,10,10,10) | Viennese Waltz | "On the Hills of Manchuria" – Ilya Shatrov |
| Paweł & Izabela | 40 (10,10,10,10) | Freestyle | "Caruso" – Lucio Dalla |
| Monika & Robert | 40 (10,10,10,10) | Cha-Cha-Cha | "Baw mnie" – Seweryn Krajewski |
| Monika & Robert | 40 (10,10,10,10) | Tango | "Nie wierz mi, nie ufaj mi" – Anna Jantar |
| Monika & Robert | 40 (10,10,10,10) | Freestyle | "Nothing Compares 2 U" – Sinéad O'Connor |

Other Dance

| Couple | Style | Music |
|---|---|---|
| Edyta & Jan | Rumba | "Liberian Girl" – Michael Jackson |
| Patricia & Łukasz | Salsa | "Yo No Se Mañana" – Luis Enrique |
| Andrzej & Magdalena | Waltz | "Georgia on My Mind" – Ray Charles |
| Maria & Tomasz | Samba | "Si Ya Se Acabó" – Jennifer Lopez |
| Dorota & Cezary | Jive | "Why Do Fools Fall in Love" – Frankie Lymon & The Teenagers |
| Andrzej & Blanka | Paso Doble | "Ayo Mi Son" — Legin Resel |
| Andrzej & Katarzyna | Foxtrot | "The Pink Panther Theme" – Henry Mancini |
| Marcin & Nina | Viennese Waltz | "Breakaway" – Kelly Clarkson |
| Anna & Krzysztof | Tango | "Tango Notturno" – Hans-Otto Borgmann |
| Robert & Anna | Waltz | "Against All Odds (Take a Look at Me Now)" – Phil Collins |
| Agnieszka & Rafał | Rumba | "Can't Stop Loving You" – Phil Collins |
| Maciej & Janja | Cha-Cha-Cha | "Marcia Baila" – Les Rita Mitsouko |
| Maciej & Janja; Agnieszka & Rafał; Robert & Anna; Anna & Krzysztof; Marcin & Nina; Andrzej & Katarzyna; Andrzej & Blanka; Dorota & Cezary; Maria & Tomasz; Andrzej & Magdalena; Patricia & Łukasz; Edyta & Jan | Group Freestyle | "Waka Waka (This Time for Africa)" – Shakira |
| Julia Kamińska & Rafał Maserak (11th Season Winners) | Freestyle | "Lux Æterna" — Clint Mansell |

== Dance schedule ==
The celebrities and professional partners danced one of these routines for each corresponding week.

- Week 1: Cha-Cha-Cha or Waltz (Men) & Group Salsa (Women)
- Week 2: Rumba or Quickstep (Women) & Group Swing (Men)
- Week 3: Jive or Tango
- Week 4: Paso Doble or Foxtrot
- Week 5: Samba or Viennese Waltz
- Week 6: Salsa or an unlearned Ballroom dance in American Smooth style
- Week 7: One unlearned dance (Comedy Week)
- Week 8: One unlearned dance (Love Stories Week)
- Week 9: One unlearned dance & Group Viennese Waltz (Anna Jantar Week)
- Week 10: One unlearned & one repeated dance
- Week 11: One unlearned & one repeated dance
- Week 12: Argentine Tango & final unlearned Latin dance
- Week 13: Favorite Latin dance, favorite Ballroom dance & Freestyle

== Dance chart ==
| Couple | 1 | 2 | 3 | 4 | 5 | 6 | 7 | 8 | 9 | | 10 | | 11 | | 12 | | 13 | | |
|---|---|---|---|---|---|---|---|---|---|---|---|---|---|---|---|---|---|---|---|
| Monika & Robert | Group Salsa | Quickstep | Jive | Foxtrot | Samba | Waltz in American Smooth | Cha-Cha-Cha | Rumba | Tango | Group Viennese Waltz | Salsa | Quickstep | Jive | Viennese Waltz | Paso Doble | Argentine Tango | Cha-Cha-Cha | Tango | Freestyle |
| Paweł & Izabela | Cha-Cha-Cha | Group Swing | Tango | Paso Doble | Samba | Foxtrot in American Smooth | Rumba | Waltz | Quickstep | Group Viennese Waltz | Jive | Tango | Cha-Cha-Cha | Viennese Waltz | Argentine Tango | Salsa | Paso Doble | Viennese Waltz | Freestyle |
| Edyta & Jan | Group Salsa | Quickstep | Tango | Paso Doble | Viennese Waltz | Salsa | Jive | Waltz | Samba | Group Viennese Waltz | Foxtrot | Salsa | Quickstep | Rumba | Cha-Cha-Cha | Argentine Tango | | | Rumba |
| Patricia & Łukasz | Group Salsa | Rumba | Tango | Paso Doble | Viennese Waltz | Salsa | Quickstep | Cha-Cha-Cha | Jive | Group Viennese Waltz | Waltz | Rumba | Paso Doble | Foxtrot | | | | | Salsa |
| Andrzej & Magdalena | Waltz | Group Swing | Jive | Foxtrot | Viennese Waltz | Salsa | Quickstep | Rumba | Tango | Group Viennese Waltz | Cha-Cha-Cha | Waltz | | | | | | | Waltz |
| Maria & Tomasz | Group Salsa | Quickstep | Jive | Foxtrot | Samba | Waltz in American Smooth | Rumba | Tango | Cha-Cha-Cha | Group Viennese Waltz | | | | | | | | | Samba |
| Dorota & Cezary | Group Salsa | Quickstep | Jive | Foxtrot | Samba | Waltz in American Smooth | Cha-Cha-Cha | Viennese Waltz | | | | | | | | | | | Jive |
| Andrzej & Blanka | Cha-Cha-Cha | Group Swing | Tango | Paso Doble | Viennese Waltz | Salsa | Foxtrot | | | | | | | | | | | | Paso Doble |
| Andrzej & Katarzyna | Waltz | Group Swing | Jive | Foxtrot | Samba | Quickstep in American Smooth | | | | | | | | | | | | | Foxtrot |
| Marcin & Nina | Waltz | Group Swing | Tango | Paso Doble | Viennese Waltz | | | | | | | | | | | | | | Viennese Waltz |
| Anna & Krzysztof | Group Salsa | Rumba | Tango | Paso Doble | | | | | | | | | | | | | | | Tango |
| Robert & Anna | Waltz | Group Swing | Jive | | | | | | | | | | | | | | | | Waltz |
| Agnieszka & Rafał | Group Salsa | Rumba | | | | | | | | | | | | | | | | | Rumba |
| Maciej & Janja | Cha-Cha-Cha | | | | | | | | | | | | | | | | | | Cha-Cha-Cha |

Highest scoring dance
Lowest scoring dance
Performed, but not scored

== Weekly results ==
| Order | Week 1 | Week 2 | Week 3 | Week 4 | Week 5 | Week 6 | Week 7 | Week 8 | Week 9 | Week 10 | Week 11 | Week 12 | Week 13 Final |
|---|---|---|---|---|---|---|---|---|---|---|---|---|---|
| 1 | Andrzej & Blanka | Edyta & Jan | Edyta & Jan | Patricia & Łukasz | Edyta & Jan | Patricia & Łukasz | Monika & Robert | Maria & Tomasz | Monika & Robert | Monika & Robert | Monika & Robert | Paweł & Izabela | Monika & Robert |
| 2 | Paweł & Izabela | Patricia & Łukasz | Patricia & Łukasz | Edyta & Jan | Paweł & Izabela | Edyta & Jan | Paweł & Izabela | Patricia & Łukasz | Paweł & Izabela | Paweł & Izabela | Edyta & Jan | Monika & Robert | Paweł & Izabela |
| 3 | Andrzej & Magdalena | Dorota & Cezary | Andrzej & Magdalena | Monika & Robert | Patricia & Łukasz | Maria & Tomasz | Andrzej & Magdalena | Monika & Robert | Edyta & Jan | Patricia & Łukasz | Paweł & Izabela | Edyta & Jan | |
| 4 | Robert & Anna | Monika & Robert | Monika & Robert | Maria & Tomasz | Maria & Tomasz | Dorota & Cezary | Maria & Tomasz | Edyta & Jan | Andrzej & Magdalena | Edyta & Jan | Patricia & Łukasz | | |
| 5 | Andrzej & Katarzyna | Anna & Krzysztof | Dorota & Cezary | Andrzej & Magdalena | Andrzej & Magdalena | Monika & Robert | Patricia & Łukasz | Andrzej & Magdalena | Patricia & Łukasz | Andrzej & Magdalena | | | |
| 6 | Marcin & Nina | Maria & Tomasz | Maria & Tomasz | Paweł & Izabela | Monika & Robert | Paweł & Izabela | Edyta & Jan | Paweł & Izabela | Maria & Tomasz | | | | |
| 7 | Maciej & Janja | Agnieszka & Rafał | Andrzej & Blanka | Dorota & Cezary | Andrzej & Blanka | Andrzej & Magdalena | Dorota & Cezary | Dorota & Cezary | | | | | |
| 8 | | | Marcin & Nina | Andrzej & Blanka | Dorota & Cezary | Andrzej & Blanka | Andrzej & Blanka | | | | | | |
| 9 | | | Paweł & Izabela | Andrzej & Katarzyna | Andrzej & Katarzyna | Andrzej & Katarzyna | | | | | | | |
| 10 | | | Andrzej & Katarzyna | Marcin & Nina | Marcin & Nina | | | | | | | | |
| 11 | | | Anna & Krzysztof | Anna & Krzysztof | | | | | | | | | |
| 12 | | | Robert & Anna | | | | | | | | | | |

This couple came in first place with the judges.
This couple came in first place with the judges and gained the highest number of viewers' votes.
This couple gained the highest number of viewers' votes.
This couple came in first place with the judges and was eliminated.
This couple came in last place with the judges and gained the highest number of viewers' votes.
This couple came in last place with the judges.
This couple came in last place with the judges and was eliminated.
This couple was eliminated.
This couple won the competition.
This couple came in second in the competition.
This couple came in third in the competition.

== Audience voting results ==
The percentage of votes cast by a couple in a particular week is given in parentheses.

| Order | Week 1 | Week 2 | Week 3 | Week 4 | Week 5 | Week 6 | Week 7 | Week 8 | Week 9 | Week 10 | Week 11 | Week 12 | Week 13 Final |
|---|---|---|---|---|---|---|---|---|---|---|---|---|---|
| 1 | Andrzej & Magdalena (34.61) | Edyta & Jan (22.56) | Andrzej & Magdalena (18.01) | Patricia & Łukasz (19.24) | Andrzej & Magdalena (13.85) | Dorota & Cezary (24.22) | Monika & Robert (19.30) | Maria & Tomasz (18.7) | Monika & Robert (32.55) | Paweł & Izabela (28.73) | Monika & Robert (40.28) | Paweł & Izabela (38.63) | Monika & Robert (55.35) |
| 2 | Andrzej & Blanka (22.59) | Dorota & Cezary (17.17) | Marcin & Nina (12.37) | Andrzej & Magdalena (15.96) | Edyta & Jan (12.06) | Patricia & Łukasz (12.5) | Andrzej & Magdalena (14.15) | Monika & Robert (16.65) | Paweł & Izabela (18.21) | Monika & Robert (26.29) | Edyta & Jan (21.98) | Monika & Robert (36.44) | Paweł & Izabela (44.65) |
| 3 | Marcin & Nina (11.09) | Anna & Krzysztof (14.22) | Edyta & Jan (11.69) | Edyta & Jan (11.3) | Paweł & Izabela (10.87) | Edyta & Jan (12.48) | Paweł & Izabela (13.42) | Patricia & Łukasz (16.65) | Andrzej & Magdalena (13.08) | Edyta & Jan (18.08) | Paweł & Izabela (20.00) | Edyta & Jan (24.93) | |
| 4 | Paweł & Izabela (8.96) | Patricia & Łukasz (12.08) | Patricia & Łukasz (10.98) | Monika & Robert (9.64) | Patricia & Łukasz (10.79) | Andrzej & Magdalena (10.62) | Dorota & Cezary (13.17) | Andrzej & Magdalena (16.59) | Patricia & Łukasz (12.94) | Patricia & Łukasz (14.77) | Patricia & Łukasz (17.74) | | |
| 5 | Robert & Anna (8.55) | Maria & Tomasz (11.92) | Dorota & Cezary (7.69) | Dorota & Cezary (7.95) | Dorota & Cezary (10.48) | Andrzej & Blanka (9.96) | Maria & Tomasz (11.92) | Edyta & Jan (12.59) | Edyta & Jan (12.14) | Andrzej & Magdalena (12.13) | | | |
| 6 | Maciej & Janja (7.33) | Agnieszka & Rafał (11.25) | Andrzej & Blanka (7.08) | Andrzej & Blanka (7.52) | Monika & Robert (9.49) | Monika & Robert (9.3) | Edyta & Jan (10.27) | Paweł & Izabela (10.48) | Maria & Tomasz (11.08) | | | | |
| 7 | Andrzej & Katarzyna (6.87) | Monika & Robert (10.8) | Monika & Robert (7.02) | Maria & Tomasz (6.76) | Andrzej & Blanka (9.29) | Maria & Tomasz (8.14) | Andrzej & Blanka (9.7) | Dorota & Cezary (8.34) | | | | | |
| 8 | | | Maria & Tomasz (6.58) | Marcin & Nina (6.03) | Maria & Tomasz (8.31) | Paweł & Izabela (6.72) | Patricia & Łukasz (8.07) | | | | | | |
| 9 | | | Paweł & Izabela (5.44) | Anna & Krzysztof (5.92) | Andrzej & Katarzyna (7.49) | Andrzej & Katrzyna (6.06) | | | | | | | |
| 10 | | | Anna & Krzysztof (5.11) | Paweł & Izabela (5.78) | Marcin & Nina (7.37) | | | | | | | | |
| 11 | | | Andrzej & Katarzyna (4.59) | Andrzej & Katarzyna (3.9) | | | | | | | | | |
| 12 | | | Robert & Anna (3.44) | | | | | | | | | | |

== Guest performances ==
| Episode | Date | Artist(s) | Song(s) | Dancer(s) |
|---|---|---|---|---|
| 1 | 5 September 2010 | Jozef Holly | "Great Balls of Fire" | VOLT Dance Group |
| 1 | 5 September 2010 | Jozef Holly | "Could We Try"/"Asturias" | VOLT Dance Group |
| 2 | 12 September 2010 | Lou Bega | "Sweet Like Cola" | VOLT Dance Group |
| 3 | 19 September 2010 | Joe Cocker | "Hard Knocks" | – |
| 3 | 19 September 2010 | Joe Cocker | "Unchain My Heart" | – |
| 4 | 26 September 2010 | Julia Kamińska | "Big Spender" | VOLT Dance Group |
| 5 | 3 October 2010 | Tomasz Szymuś's Orchestra | "California Gurls" | VOLT Dance Group |
| 6 | 10 October 2010 | Caro Emerald | "A Night Like This" | Janja Lesar & Krzysztof Hulboj, Nina Tyrka & Michał Uryniuk |
| 7 | 17 October 2010 | Golec uOrkiestra | "Ściernisko" | – |
| 8 | 24 October 2010 | Tomasz Szymuś's Orchestra | "I Say a Little Prayer" | VOLT Dance Group |
| 8 | 24 October 2010 | Tomasz Szymuś's Orchestra | "The Look of Love"/"Mas Que Nada" | Michał Malitowski & Joanna Leunis |
| 9 | 31 October 2010 | Tomasz Szymuś's Orchestra | "Wielka dama tańczy sama" | VOLT Dance Group |
| 9 | 31 October 2010 | Natalia Kukulska | "Radość najpiękniejszych lat" | – |
| 10 | 7 November 2010 | Zbigniew Wodecki | "Szklana pogoda" | VOLT Dance Group |
| 11 | 14 November 2010 | Afromental | "Rock&Rollin'love" | – |
| 12 | 21 November 2010 | Pauline | "Never Said I Was an Angel" | VOLT Dance Group |
| 13 | 28 November 2010 | Edyta Górniak | "When I Look at You" | Ján Kliment |

== Rating figures ==
| Date | Episode | Official rating 4+ | Share 4+ | Official rating 16–39 | Share 16–39 |
|---|---|---|---|---|---|
| 5 September 2010 | 1 | 4 261 993 | 27.80% | 1 754 592 | 25.95% |
| 12 September 2010 | 2 | 4 293 571 | 27.69% | 1 733 311 | 24.64% |
| 19 September 2010 | 3 | 4 352 478 | 29.15% | 1 626 997 | 23.48% |
| 26 September 2010 | 4 | 4 118 160 | 26.26% | 1 569 621 | 21.59% |
| 3 October 2010 | 5 | 4 345 232 | 27.59% | 1 722 293 | 23.47% |
| 10 October 2010 | 6 | 4 644 528 | 28.99% | 1 768 557 | 24.39% |
| 17 October 2010 | 7 | 4 868 327 | 29.18% | 1 753 978 | 22.77% |
| 24 October 2010 | 8 | 4 676 420 | 27.85% | 1 749 496 | 22.65% |
| 31 October 2010 | 9 | 4 356 524 | 27.66% | 1 607 606 | 22.98% |
| 7 November 2010 | 10 | 4 697 868 | 28.08% | 1 748 685 | 22.67% |
| 14 November 2010 | 11 | 4 970 335 | 30.01% | 1 932 796 | 25.43% |
| 21 November 2010 | 12 | 4 998 573 | 29.56% | 1 892 106 | 24.59% |
| 28 November 2010 | 13 | 5 694 227 | 32.72% | 2 353 516 | 28.93% |
| Average | Season 12 | 4 625 858 | 28.70% | 1 782 714 | 24.14% |
