= Jak oni śpiewają season 6 =

Jak oni śpiewają
- Season 6
- Hosted by: Katarzyna Cichopek; Krzysztof Ibisz
- Judges: Edyta Górniak; Rudi Schuberth; Elżbieta Zapendowska
- Winner: Krzysztof Respondek
- Runner-up: Agnieszka Włodarczyk

Release
- Original network: Polsat
- Original release: September 12 – November 21, 2009

Season chronology
- ← Previous; Season 5

The 6th season of Jak oni śpiewają, the Polish edition of Soapstar Superstar, started on September 12, 2009, and ended on November 21, 2009. It was broadcast by Polsat. Katarzyna Cichopek and Krzysztof Ibisz continued as the hosts, and the judges were: Edyta Górniak, Elżbieta Zapendowska and Rudi Schuberth.

== Stars ==
Celebrity	Status
Robert Moskwa	Eliminated 1st on September 19, 2009
Maciej Jachowski	Eliminated 2nd on September 26, 2009
Karolina Nowakowska	Eliminated 3rd on October 3, 2009
Joanna Jabłczyńska	Eliminated 4th on October 10, 2009
Laura Samojłowicz	Withdrew on October 17, 2009
Robert Kudelski	Eliminated 6th on October 31, 2009
Patricia Kazadi	Eliminated 7th on November 7, 2009
Joanna Liszowska	Eliminated 8th on November 14, 2009
Artur Chamski	Third Place on November 21, 2009
Agnieszka Włodarczyk	Second Place on November 21, 2009
Krzysztof Respondek	Winner on November 21, 2009

== Scores ==
Couple	Place	1	2	3	4	5	6	7	8	9	10
Krzysztof Respondek	1	5.7	4.2	5.0	5.7	6.0 + 6.0 = 12.0	6.0 + 6.0 = 12.0	5.2 + 5.5 = 10.7	4.2 + 5.5 = 9.7	6.0 + 6.0 = 12.0	6.0 + 5.3 + 6.0 = 17.3
Agnieszka Włodarczyk	2	2.3	5.0	5.3	5.8	6.0 + 4.7 = 10.7	6.0 + 6.0 = 12.0	5.7 + 4.7 = 10.4	5.2 + 5.3 = 10.5	6.0 + 6.0 = 12.0	6.0 + 6.0+ 6.0 = 18.0
Artur Chamski	3	3.5	5.7	4.7	4.2	6.0 + 6.0 = 12.0	6.0 + 5.7 = 11.7	5.7 + 6.0 = 11.7	4.5 + 5.3 = 9.8	5.7 + 6.0 = 11.7	6.0 + 6.0 = 12.0
Joanna Liszowska	4	5.3	5.3	3.3	5.8	6.0 + 6.0 = 12.0	6.0 + 6.0 = 12.0	5.8 + 5.7 = 11.5	5.0 + 5.3 = 10.3	6.0 + 6.0 = 12.0	
Patricia Kazadi	5	5.7	5.5	6.0	5.0	6.0 + 6.0 = 12.0	5.7 + 6.0 = 11.7	4.7 + 5.5 = 10.2			
Robert Kudelski	6	2.8	3.5	4.3	5.3	3.0 + 3.7 = 6.7	4.0 + 6.0 = 10.0	4.7			
Laura Samojłowicz	7	4.7	5.3	6.0	6.0	3.0 + 5.8 = 8.8					
Joanna Jabłczyńska	8	4.2	5.2	5.2	6.0	6.0					
Karolina Nowakowska	9	4.0	5.7	5.0							
Maciej Jachowski	10	3.2	5.0								
Robert Moskwa	11	3.5									

Red numbers indicate the lowest score for each week.
Green numbers indicate the highest score for each week.
indicates the star eliminated that week.
indicates the returning stars that finished in the bottom two.
indicates the star who has got immunitet.
indicates the star withdrew.

=== The Best Score (6.0) ===
No	Star	Song	Episode	6.0
1	Joanna Jabłczyńska	All you need is love, The Beatles	4	2
1	Joanna Jabłczyńska	Sing,Sing, Maryla Rodowicz	5	2
2	Artur Chamski	Pokaż na co cię stać, Feel	5	7
2	Artur Chamski	New York, New York, Frank Sinatra	5	7
2	Artur Chamski	Psalm Dla Ciebie, Piotr Rubik	6	7
2	Artur Chamski	You are not alone, Michael Jackson	7	7
2	Artur Chamski	Zawsze tam,gdzie ty, Lady Pank	9	7
2	Artur Chamski	Livin'la vida loca, Ricky Martin	10	7
2	Artur Chamski	Black or white, Michael Jackson	10	7
3	Agnieszka Włodarczyk	Lady marmolade, Christina Aguilera, Lil' Kim, Mýa i Pink	5	8
3	Agnieszka Włodarczyk	Nie żałuję, Edyta Geppert	6	8
3	Agnieszka Włodarczyk	Powiedz, Ich Troje	6	8
3	Agnieszka Włodarczyk	Habanera, Opera	9	8
3	Agnieszka Włodarczyk	Always, Bon Jovi	9	8
3	Agnieszka Włodarczyk	Bailamos, Enrique Iglesias	10	8
3	Agnieszka Włodarczyk	The way you make me fell, Michael Jackson	10	8
3	Agnieszka Włodarczyk	Daj mi tę noc, Bolter	10	8
6	Robert Kudelski	Urke, Wilki	6	1
8	Laura Samojłowicz	This is the life, Amy Macdonald	3	2
8	Laura Samojłowicz	Fever, Elvis Presley	4	2
10	Patricia Kazadi	Poker face, Lady Gaga	3	4
10	Patricia Kazadi	Sing-Sing, Maryla Rodowicz	5	4
10	Patricia Kazadi	Let the sunshine, Hair	5	4
10	Patricia Kazadi	Mam już dość, Ich Troje	6	4
11	Joanna Liszowska	Lady marmolade, Christina Aguilera, Lil' Kim, Mýa i Pink	5	4
11	Joanna Liszowska	Life is a cabaret, Liza Minnelli	5	4
11	Joanna Liszowska	Dziś prawdziwych Cyganów już nie ma, Maryla Rodowicz	6	4
11	Joanna Liszowska	Śpij kochany, śpij, Kayah	6	4

=== Average Chart ===
Place	Star	Average	Total	Best Score	Worst Score	Number of songs
1.	Patricia Kazadi	5.61	56.1	6.0	4.7	10
2.	Krzysztof Respondek	5.54	94.3	6.0	4.2	17
3.	Joanna Liszowska	5.53	77.5	6.0	3.3	14
4.	Artur Chamski	5.43	87	6.0	3.5	16
5.	Agnieszka Włodarczyk	5.41	92	6.0	2.3	17
6.	Joanna Jabłczyńska	5.32	26.6	6.0	4.2	5
7.	Laura Samojłowicz	5.13	30.8	6.0	3.0	6
8.	Karolina Nowakowska	4.90	14.7	5.7	4.0	3
9.	Robert Kudelski	4.15	37.3	6.0	2.8	9
10.	Maciej Jachowski	4.10	8.2	5.0	3.2	2
11.	Robert Moskwa	3.50	3.5	3.5	3.5	1
Everystar		5.18	518	6.0	2.3	100

== Episodes ==
=== Week 1 ===
Individual judges scores in charts below (given in parentheses) are listed in this order from left to right: Edyta Górniak, Rudi Schuberth, Elżbieta Zapendowska

Running order

Star	Score	Song
Joanna Jabłczyńska	4.2 (4,5,3.5)	Michael Jackson – "Heal the World"
Artur Chamski	3.5 (3,4,3.5)	Robert Janson – "Małe Szczęścia"
Agnieszka Włodarczyk	2.3 (2,3,2)	The Mamas & the Papas – "California Dreaming"
Maciej Jachowski	3.2 (3,3,3.5)	Elton John – "I'm Still Standing"
Krzysztof Respondek	5.7 (6,6,5)	Michael Bolton – "When a Man Loves a Woman"
Karolina Nowakowska	4.0 (4,5,3)	Feel & Iwona Węgrowska – "Pokonaj Siebie"
Robert Kudelski	2.8 (2,3,3.5)	Ricky Martin – "Maria"
Laura Samojłowicz	4.7 (4,6,4)	Janis Joplin – "Piece of My Heart"
Robert Moskwa	3.5 (3,4,3.5)	Elektryczne Gitary – "Co Ty Tutaj Robisz?"
Patricia Kazadi	5.7 (6,6,5)	Tina Turner – "What's Love Got to Do with It"
Joanna Liszowska	5.3 (5,6,5)	Queen – "Somebody to Love"

=== Week 2 ===
Individual judges scores in charts below (given in parentheses) are listed in this order from left to right: Edyta Górniak, Rudi Schuberth, Elżbieta Zapendowska

Running order

Star	Score	Song
Joanna Jabłczyńska	5.2 (5,6,4.5)	Diana King – "Shy Guy"
Artur Chamski	5.7 (6,6,5)	The Rasmus – "In the Shadows"
Agnieszka Włodarczyk	5.0 (4,6,5)	Monika Brodka – "Miełeś Być"
Maciej Jachowski	5.0 (5,5,5)	Magma – "Aicha"
Krzysztof Respondek	4.2 (4,5,3.5)	Kombii – "Awinion"
Karolina Nowakowska	5.7 (6,6,5)	Nelly Furtado – "Maneater"
Robert Kudelski	3.5 (3,4,3.5)	Lou Bega – "Mambo No. 5"
Laura Samojłowicz	5.3 (5,6,5)	Kayah & Goran Bregović – "Prawy Do Lewego"
Patricia Kazadi	5.5 (5,6,5.5)	Kayah – "Testosteron"
Joanna Liszowska	5.3 (5,6,5)	Everything but the Girl – "Missing"
Edyta Górniak	–	Czesław Niemen – "Dziwny jest ten świat"

=== Week 3 ===
Individual judges scores in charts below (given in parentheses) are listed in this order from left to right: Edyta Górniak, Rudi Schuberth, Elżbieta Zapendowska

Running order

Star	Score	Song
Joanna Jabłczyńska	5.2 (4,6,5.5)	Katy Perry – "I Kissed a Girl"
Artur Chamski	4.7 (4,5,5)	Pectus – "Jeden Moment"
Agnieszka Włodarczyk	5.3 (6,6,4)	Edyta Górniak – "To Nie Tak Jak Myślisz"
Maciej Jachowski	–	Artur Gadowski – "Szczęśliwego Nowego Yorku"
Krzysztof Respondek	5.0 (5,5,5)	PIN – "Konstelacje"
Karolina Nowakowska	5.0 (5,5,5)	Bajm – "Ta Sama Chwila"
Robert Kudelski	4.3 (4,5,4)	Eric Clapton – "Layla"
Laura Samojłowicz	6.0 (6,6,6)	Amy Macdonald – "This Is the Life"
Patricia Kazadi	6.0 (6,6,6)	Lady Gaga – "Poker Face"
Joanna Liszowska	3.3 (2,5,3)	Agnes – "Release Me"

=== Week 4 ===
Individual judges scores in charts below (given in parentheses) are listed in this order from left to right: Edyta Górniak, Rudi Schuberth, Elżbieta Zapendowska

Running order

Star	Score	Song
Joanna Jabłczyńska	6.0 (6,6,6)	The Beatles – "All You Need Is Love"
Artur Chamski	4.2 (3,5,4.5)	Bee Gees – "Stayin Alive"
Agnieszka Włodarczyk	5.8 (6,6,5.5)	Tina Turner – "Simply the Best"
Krzysztof Respondek	5.7 (6,6,5)	Bob Marley – "No Woman, No Cry"
Karolina Nowakowska	–	Cher – "Strong Enough"
Robert Kudelski	5.3 (6,5,5)	Elton John – "Can You Feel the Love Tonight"
Laura Samojłowicz	6.0 (6,6,6)	Elvis Presley – "Fever"
Patricia Kazadi	5.0 (4,5,6)	Madonna – "La Isla Bonita"
Joanna Liszowska	5.8 (6,6,5.5)	Queen – "We Are the Champions"

=== Week 5 ===
Individual judges scores in charts below (given in parentheses) are listed in this order from left to right: Edyta Górniak, Rudi Schuberth, Elżbieta Zapendowska

Running order

Star	Score	Song
Joanna Jabłczyńska & Patricia Kazadi	6.0 (6,6,6)	Maryla Rodowicz – "Sing, Sing"
Artur Chamski & Krzysztof Respondek	6.0 (6,6,6)	Feel – "Pokaż Na Co Cię Stać"
Agnieszka Włodarczyk & Joanna Liszowska	6.0 (6,6,6)	Christina Aguilera & Lil' Kim & Mýa & P!nk – "Lady Marmalade"
Robert Kudelski & Laura Samojłowicz	3.0 (2,4,3)	Robbie Williams & Nicole Kidman – "Something Stupid"

Running order

Star	Score	Song
Artur Chamski	6.0 (6,6,6)	Frank Sinatra – "New York City" from "New York, New York"
Agnieszka Włodarczyk	4.7 (4,5,5)	ABBA – "Dancing Queen" from "Mamma Mia"
Krzysztof Respondek	6.0 (6,6,6)	"Memory" from "Cats" duet with Daria Druzgała
Robert Kudelski	3.7 (3,4,4)	"Belle" from "Notre-Dame de Paris"
Laura Samojłowicz	5.8 (6,6,5.5)	"Total Eclipse of the Heart" from "Dance of the Vampires" duet with Marcin Mroziński
Patricia Kazadi	6.0 (6,6,6)	"Let the Sun Shine In" from "Hair"
Joanna Liszowska	6.0 (6,6,6)	"Life is a Cabaret" from "Cabaret"
Edyta Górniak	–	"Litania" from "Metro"

=== Week 6 ===
Individual judges scores in charts below (given in parentheses) are listed in this order from left to right: Edyta Górniak, Rudi Schuberth, Elżbieta Zapendowska

Running order

Star	Score	Song
Artur Chamski	6.0 (6,6,6)	Andrzej Piaseczny – "Chodź, Przytul, Przebacz"
Artur Chamski	5.7 (5,6,6)	Piotr Rubik – "Psalm Dla Ciebie"
Agnieszka Włodarczyk	6.0 (6,6,6)	Edyta Geppert – "Nie Żałuję"
Agnieszka Włodarczyk	6.0 (6,6,6)	Ich Troje – "Powiedz"
Krzysztof Respondek	6.0 (6,6,6)	Rod Stewart – "When I Need You"
Krzysztof Respondek	6.0 (6,6,6)	Budka Suflera – "Bal Wszystkich Świętych"
Robert Kudelski	4.0 (3,5,4)	Garou – "Seul"
Robert Kudelski	6.0 (6,6,6)	Wilki – "Urke"
Patricia Kazadi	5.7 (5,6,6)	Edyta Bartosiewicz – "Ostatni"
Patricia Kazadi	6.0 (6,6,6)	Ich Troje – "Mam Już Dość" duet with Michał Wiśniewski
Joanna Liszowska	6.0 (6,6,6)	Maryla Rodowicz – "Dziś Prawdziwych Cyganów Już Nie Ma"
Joanna Liszowska	6.0 (6,6,6)	Kayah & Goran Bregović – "Śpij, Kochanie Śpij"

== Song Chart ==
Star	Week 1	Week 2	Week 3	Week 4	Week 5		Week 6		Week 7		Week 8			Week 9				Week 10 Final			
Krzysztof Respondek	When a man loves a woman	Awinion	Konstelacje	No woman, no cry	Pokaż na co cię stać	Pamięć	When I need you	Bal wszystkich świętych	Ale to już było	Dni, których nie znamy	I just call to say 'I love you'	Wspomnienie	A wszystko to, bo ciebie kocham	La donna mobile	Niepokonani	Niebo z moich stron	We are the world	Cancion del Mariachi	Beat it	Zabiorę cię...	O, Hela!
Agnieszka Włodarczyk	California dreaming	Miałeś być	To nie tak, jak myślisz	Simply the best	Lady marmolade	Dancing queen	Nie żałuję	Powiedz	Especially for you	Nic nie może wiecznie trwać	My heart will go on	Jest taki samotny dom	Czerwone korale	Habanera	Always	Życie cudem jest	We are the world	Bailamos	The way you make me fell	Daj mi tę noc	Odkryjemy miłość nieznaną
Artur Chamski	Małe szczęścia	In the shadows	Jeden moment	Stayin alive	Pokaż na co cię stać	New York, New York	Psalm dla ciebie	Chodź, przytul, przebacz	Especially for you	You are not alone	Raindrops keep falling on my head	Nie chcę więcej	Całuj mnie	Nessun Dorma	Zawsze tam,gdzie ty	Tolerancja	We are the world	Livin'la vida loca	Black or white		
Joanna Liszowska	Somebody to love	Missing	Release me	We are the champions	Lady marmolade	Life is a cabaret	Dziś prawdziwych Cyganów już nie ma	Śpij kochany, śpij	Ale to już było	My heart belongs to daddy	Say you, say me	Jaka róża, taki cierń	Biała armia	Libiamo ne lieti calic	Still loving you	Radość najpiękniejszych lat	We are the world				
Patricia Kazadi	What's love got to do with it?	Testosteron	Poker face	La isla bointa	Sing-Sing	Let the sunshine in	Ostatni	Mam już dość	Z Tobą chcę oglądać świat	Pod papugami			Zanim zrozumieszs								
Robert Kudelski	Maria	Mambo Nr. 5	Layla	Can you feel the love tonight?	Something stupid	Belle	Seul	Urke	Z tobą chcę oglądać świat	Ostatnia niedziela											
Laura Samojłowicz	Piece of my heart	Prawy do lewego	This is the life	Fever	Something stupid	Total eclipse of the heart															
Joanna Jabłczyńska	Heal the world	Shy Guy	I kissed a girl	All you need is love	Sing-Sing																
Karolina Nowakowska	Pokonaj siebie	Maneater	Ta sama chwila	Strong Enough																	
Maciej Jachowski	I'm still standing	Aisha	Szczęśliwego Nowego Yorku																		
Robert Moskwa	Co ty tutaj robisz?																				

Not scored
Highest scoring
Lowest scoring

== Rating Figures ==
Episode	Date	Official rating 4+	Share 4+	Share 16–39
1	September 12, 2009	2 614 126	18,58%	16,35%
2	September 19, 2009	2 762 120	19,98%	18,16%
3	September 26, 2009	2 478 670	17,21%	14,94%
4	October 3, 2009	2 551 552	16,85%	13,92%
5	October 10, 2009	2 671 967	17,19%	14,32%
6	October 17, 2009	2 324 515	16,71%	13,11%
7	October 31, 2009	2 594 931	16,88%	14,96%
8	November 7, 2009	3 014 888	19,18%	16,37%
9	November 14, 2009	3 141 112	20,23%	15,13%
10	November 21, 2009	3 563 374	24,29%	21,01%
Average	–	2 785 239	18,81%	15,87%
