= Jachowski =

Jachowski (feminine: Jachowska, plural: Jachowscy) is a Polish surname. Notable people with the surname include:

- Maciej Jachowski (born 1977), Polish actor and singer

== See also ==
- 11743 Jachowski (1999 JP130), a main-belt asteroid discovered in 1999
