= Seweryn Krajewski =

Polish singer (born 1947)

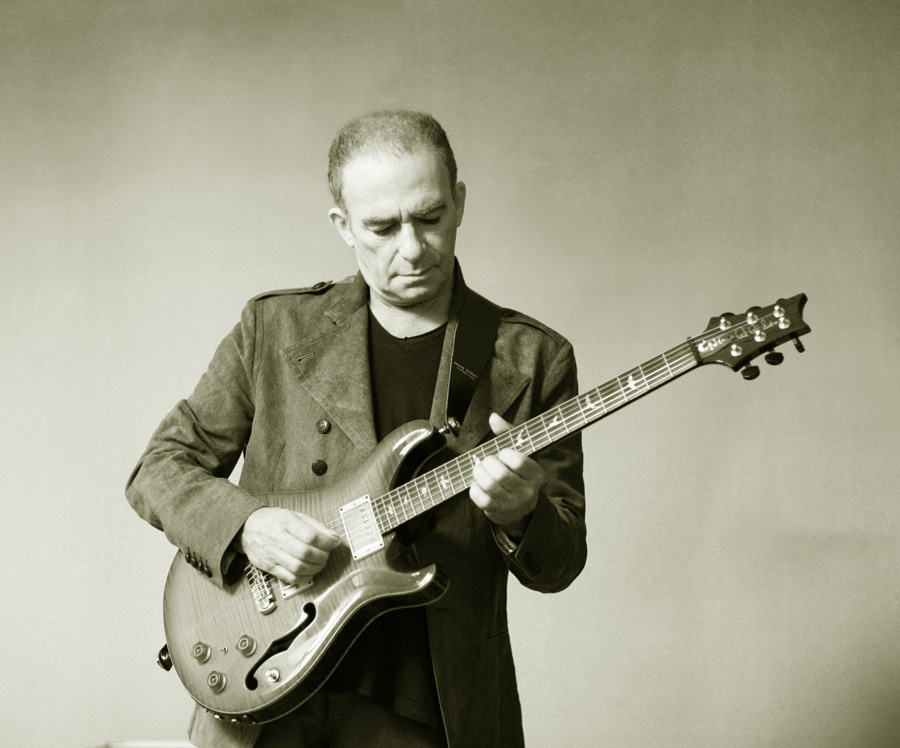

Background information
- Born: 3 January 1947 (age 79); Nowa Sól, Poland
- Genres: Pop, pop rock
- Occupations: Musician, singer
- Instruments: Guitar, piano, bass, violin
- Labels: Polskie Nagrania Muza, Soliton, Wydawnictwo św. Stanisława BM, Sony Music Entertainment Poland
- Website: http://sewerynkrajewskifundacja.com/

Seweryn Krajewski (born 3 January 1947, Nowa Sól, Poland) is a Polish singer and songwriter who rose to fame in the 1960s and 70s with the popular Polish band Czerwone Gitary. After leaving the group in 1997, he recorded several solo albums.

He has written songs for many popular Polish singers including Irena Jarocka, Maryla Rodowicz, Urszula Sipińska, Zdzisława Sośnicka, Edyta Geppert and many others.

== Discography ==
=== Studio albums ===
Title	Album details	Peak chart positions	Sales	Certifications
Title	Album details	POL	Sales	Certifications
Strofki na gitarę	Released: 1981; Label: Polskie Nagrania Muza; Formats: LP, CD	—		
Uciekaj moje serce	Released: 1983; Label: Wifon; Formats: LP	—		
Reflective Moods	Released: 1986; Label: Coloursound Library; Formats: LP	—		
Baw mnie	Released: 1986; Label: Wifon; Formats: LP	—		
Romantic Reflections	Released: 1987; Label: Coloursound Library; Formats: LP	—		
Części zamienne	Released: 1989; Label: Polskie Nagrania Muza; Formats: LP, CD, CS	—		
Koniec	Released: 1995; Label: Tra - La - La; Formats: CD	—		
Najpiękniejsza	Released: 1995; Label: Tra - La - La; Formats: CD	—		
Czekasz na tę jedną chwilę...	Released: 1998; Label: Yesterday; Formats: CD	—		
Lubię ten smutek	Released: 30 January 2001; Label: Soliton; Formats: CD	—		
Jestem	Released: 27 August 2003; Label: Sony Music Entertainment Poland; Formats: CD	9		
Jak tam jest	Released: 21 February 2011; Label: Sony Music Entertainment Poland; Formats: CD, digital download	1	POL: 30,000+	POL: Platinum
"—" denotes a recording that did not chart or was not released in that territory.

=== Collaborative albums ===
Title	Album details	Peak chart positions	Sales	Certifications
Title	Album details	POL	Sales	Certifications
Zimowe piosenki (with Andrzej Piaseczny)	Released: 13 November 2012; Label: Sony Music Entertainment Poland; Formats: CD, digital download	1	POL: 30,000+	POL: Platinum
"—" denotes a recording that did not chart or was not released in that territory.

=== Live albums ===
Title	Album details	Peak chart positions	Sales	Certifications
Title	Album details	POL	Sales	Certifications
Na przekór nowym czasom - live (with Andrzej Piaseczny)	Released: 30 November 2009; Label: Sony Music Entertainment Poland; Formats: CD, digital download	2	POL: 60,000+	POL: 2× Platinum
"—" denotes a recording that did not chart or was not released in that territory.

=== Compilation albums ===
Title	Album details	Peak chart positions
Title	Album details	POL
Złota kolekcja. Pogoda na szczęście	Released: 17 November 2001; Label: Pomaton; Formats: CD	2
"—" denotes a recording that did not chart or was not released in that territory.

=== Other releases ===
Title	Album details	Notes
Seweryn Krajewski śpiewa wiersze Karola Wojtyły	Released: 24 March 2009; Label: Wydawnictwo św. Stanisława BM; Formats: CD	"Nowe cuda" book insert (ISBN 978-83-7422-221-1)
