= Andrzej Deskur (actor) =

Polish actor (born 1972)

- Deskur in 2014
- Born: 28 May 1972 (age 54); Warsaw, Poland
- Education: AST National Academy of Theatre Arts
- Occupation: Actor
- Years active: 1994–present
- Children: 4
- Relatives: Andrzej Maria Deskur (uncle)

Andrzej Deskur (born 28 May 1972) is a Polish actor.

== Biography ==
Deskur was born in Warsaw. He is a nephew of Cardinal Andrzej Maria Deskur, after whom he was named. He graduated from the AST National Academy of Theatre Arts in Kraków.

He began his career acting at the Ludowy Theatre. In 2009, he competed on the fifth season of Jak oni śpiewają. The following year, he competed on the 12th season of Taniec z gwiazdami.

=== Personal life ===
Deskur was married to Beata Nowak, with whom he has two daughters. He also has two children with his current wife, Tomiła Łojewska.

== Selected filmography ==
=== Film ===
- Our God's Brother (1997)
- All My Loved Ones (1999)
- Ryś (2007)
- Traffic Department (2012)
- Sprawiedliwy (2015)
- Volta (2017)
- Chopin, a Sonata in Paris (2025)

=== Television ===
- Na dobre i na złe (2000–2005)
- Karol: A Man Who Became Pope (2005)
- Magda M. (2005–2007)
- Fala zbrodni (2006–2007)
- Majka (2010)
- Days of Honor (2011)
- Galeria (2012–2014)
- First Love (2014)
- Singielka (2016)
- Druga szansa (2017)
- The Crown of the Kings (2018–2019)
- Blondynka (2018–2020)
- Friends (2023)
- The Doll (2026)
