= Bożena Dykiel =

Polish actress (1948–2026)

Bozena Dykiel
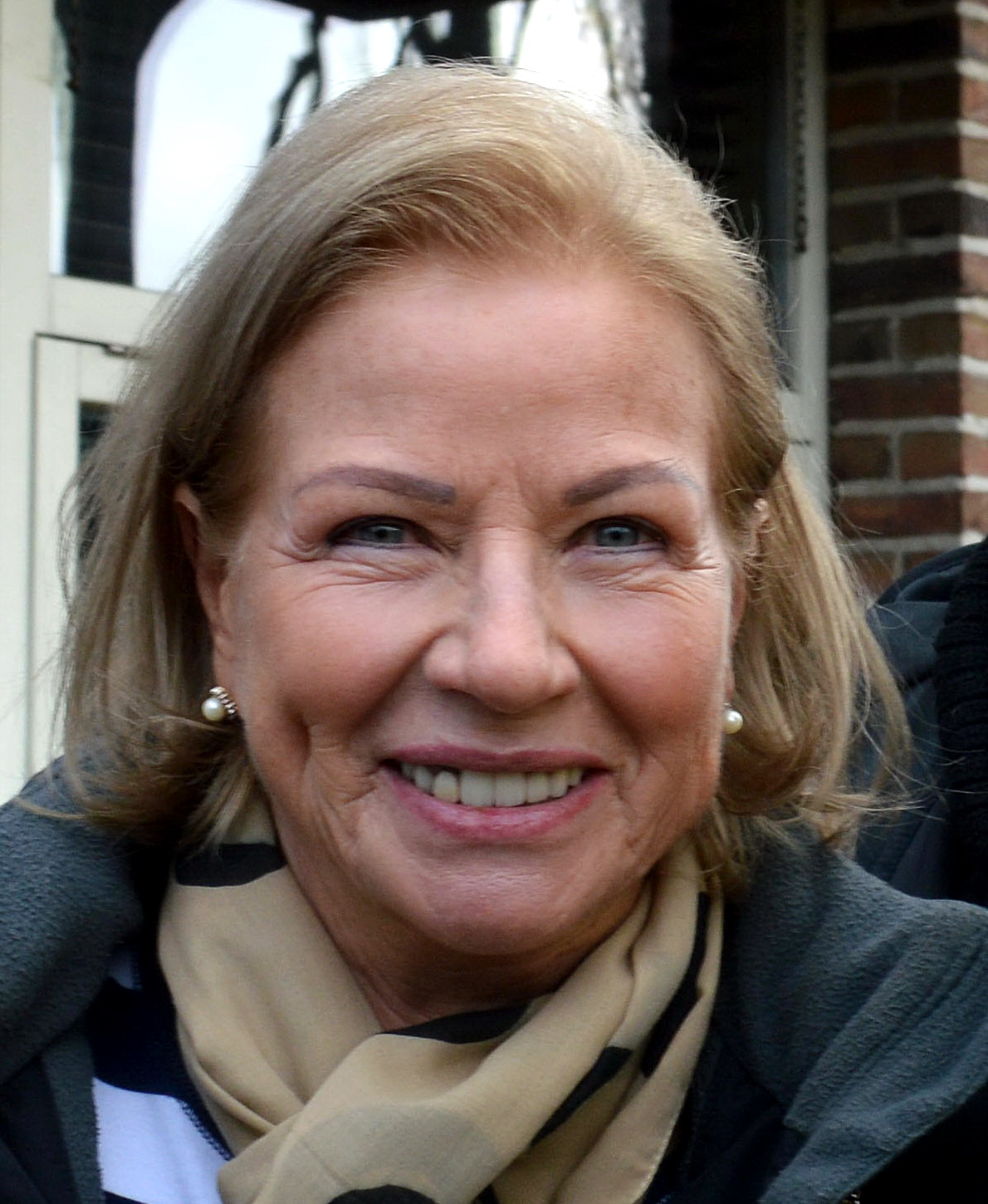
- Dykiel in 2018
- Born: 26 August 1948; Grabowo, Poland
- Died: 12 February 2026 (aged 77)
- Occupation: Actress
- Years active: 1972–2026

Bożena Dykiel (Polish: [bɔːˈʐɛna ˈdɨkʲel]; 26 August 1948 – 12 February 2026) was a Polish theatre and film actress. She died on 12 February 2026, at the age of 77.

== Filmography ==
- Trzeba zabić tę miłość (1972) as nurse
- Na Wspólnej as Maria Zięba (2003–2026; TV series)

Source.
