= Anna Kalata =

Polish politician (born 1964)

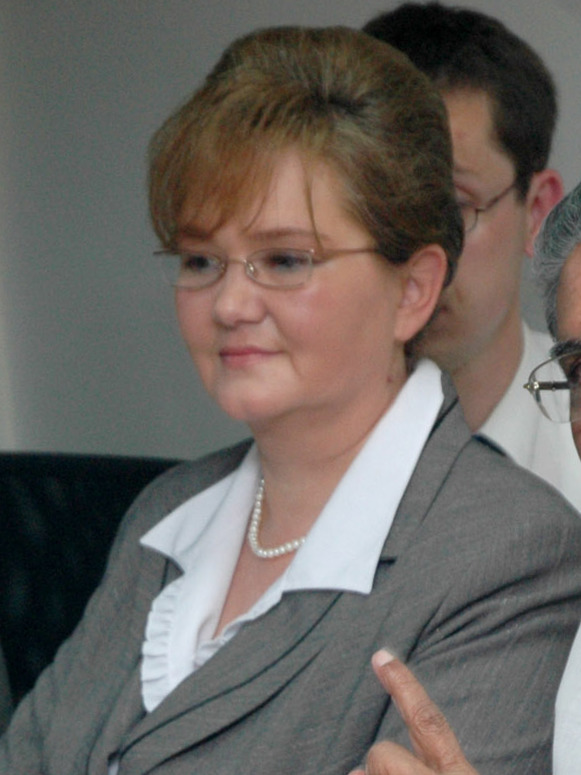
Anna Kalata (2007)

Anna Kalata (born 10 May 1964, Milanówek, Poland) is a Polish politician, celebrity and occasional actress. She was a member of the populist Samoobrona party. In Jarosław Kaczyński's cabinet she was the minister of labour and social policy. She participated in the 12th season of Taniec z Gwiazdami (the Polish version of Dancing With The Stars). After losing 38 kilograms (84 lb) she appeared on the cover of Shape magazine.
