= Ryszard Rynkowski =

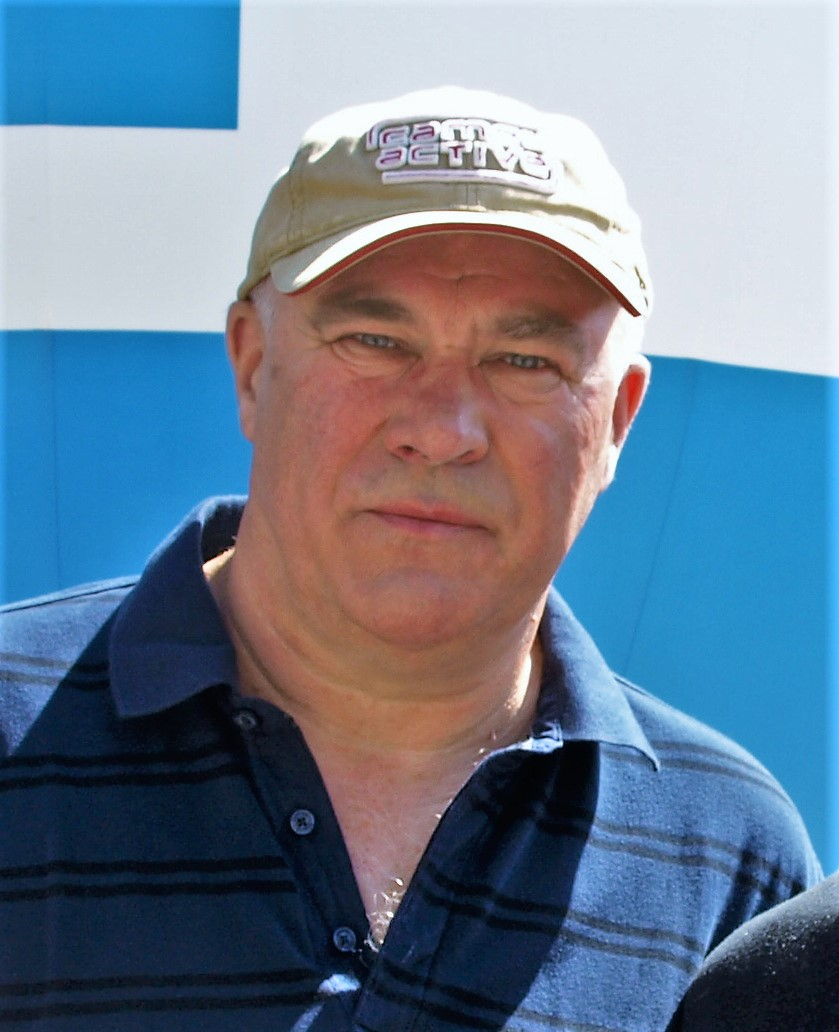

Background information
- Born: October 9, 1951 (age 74); Elbląg
- Genres: Pop
- Instrument: Piano
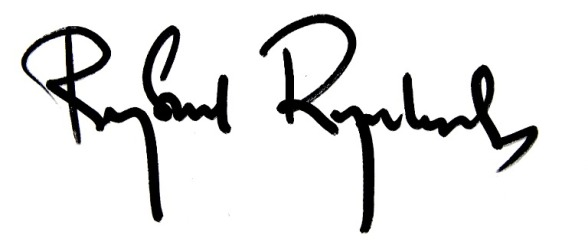

Ryszard Rynkowski (born October 9, 1951, in Elbląg) is a Polish singer, composer, pianist and actor. In the years 1978—1987 accompanist of Vox music band, a solo artist since 1987. His trademark is the scratchy, smoky voice. Joe Cocker himself therefore also called him the "Polish Joe Cocker".

He was awarded with the Knight's Cross of the Order of Polonia Restituta and the Order of the Smile. He also is honorary citizen of Elbląg, Poland.

== Biography ==
=== Early career ===
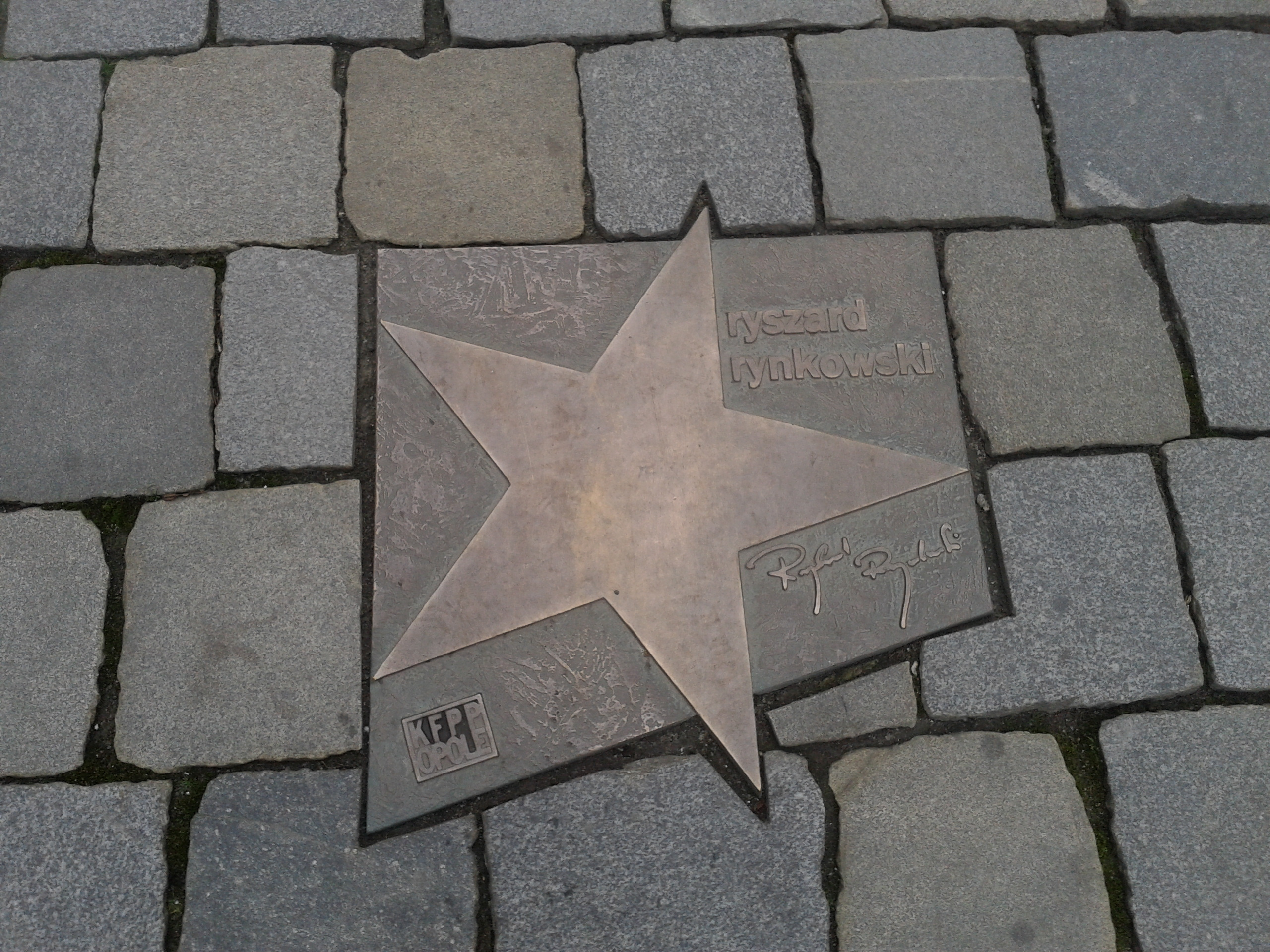
Ryszard Rynkowski's star in Opole

As a child he learned the piano, first from an organist in his home parish and then at a state music school. He then played in various amateur bands in Elbląg. From 1967 to 1970 he studied at the gymnasium Juliusz Słowacki in Elbląg, where he directed the cabaret "Tak To Bywa". With this cabaret he won 2nd place at a competition of schools in northern Poland in 1968. He then studied at the Faculty of Music Education in Olsztyn.

He made his musical debut in 1972 with the group El at the 5th Student Cultural Festival in Olsztyn. In 1973 he moved to Warsaw and began working at the Warsaw Operetta and Theatre Targówek (later renamed Rampa Theatre).

From 1977 to 1978 he was the pianist of the Gramine Blues Group, a Polish vocal/instrumental ensemble. At the same time, he wrote the music for the play Rapsod Polski, which was performed in Pruszków near Warsaw by a theatre group led by Bolesław Jastrzębski accompanied by a VIP band. He was then a member of the band Victoria Singers, which changed its name to Vox in 1979. He wrote numerous songs for this band, including:

- Masz w oczach dwa nieba (3rd prize for KFPP Opole '79) (KFPP = National Festival of Polish Song in Opole),
- Bananowy Song (awarded the Bronze Lyre at the Bratislava Festival 1980),
- Szczęśliwej drogi, już czas.

=== Solo career ===
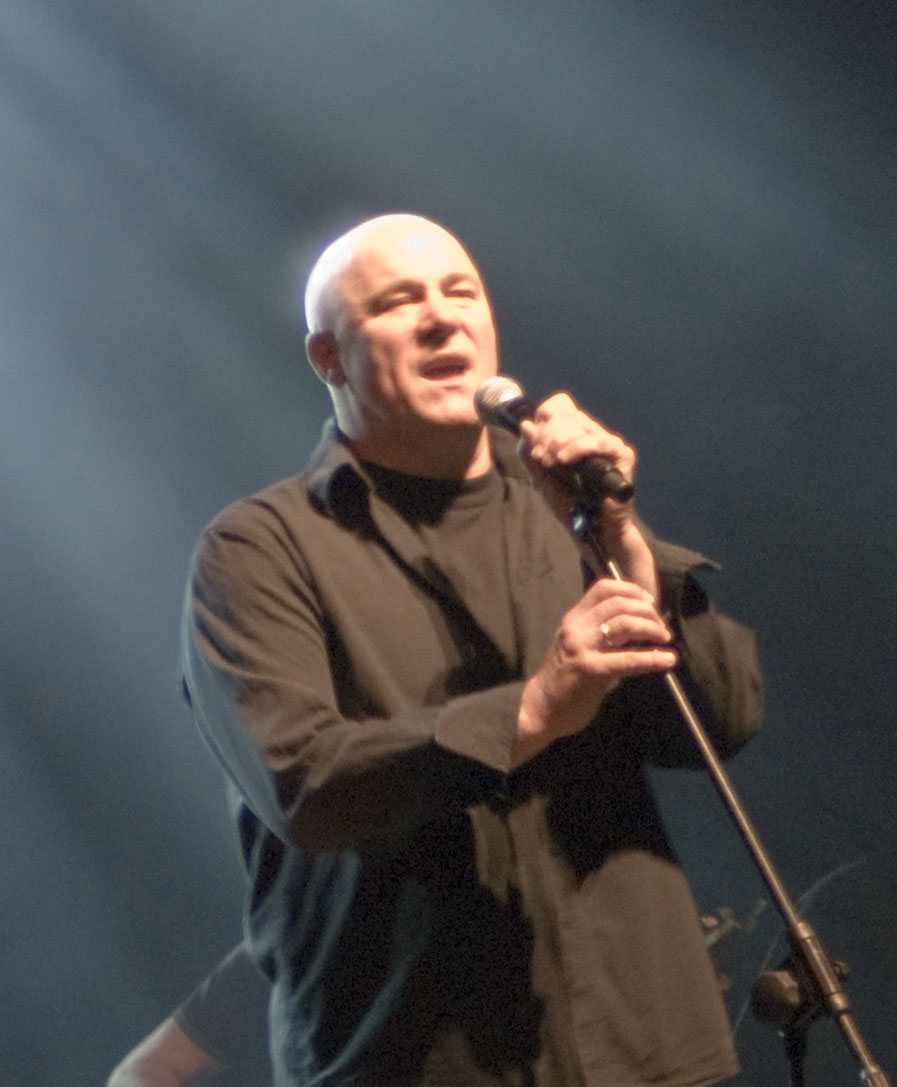
Ryszard Rynkowski - concert in Poznań 2008

After parting ways with the group Vox in 1987, he embarked on a solo career. He managed to emerge as the winner of the National Festival of Polish Songs in Opole in 1979, 1989, 1990 and 1994 respectively.

In 1993, he appeared in the title role of "Pan Twardowski" in the musical of the same name. In 2001, he was named Singer of the Year by Phonographic Academy of Poland and received the annual "Fryderyk" award as a distinction. Prize.

On 10 December 2001, Rynkowski and Joe Cocker gave a joint charity concert in Warsaw, which culminated with a duet by the two (High Time We Went). In this way, Rynkowski celebrated his 50th birthday, which was celebrated in September of that year. Another joint concert took place on 5 July 2002 in Szczecin at the Pogoń Stadium. This collaboration led to, that the album Ten typ tak ma, released the following year in 2003, was recorded with support from some of Joe Cocker's band, including Deric Dyer, Nick Milo and Jack Bruno, and bassist Dale Davis (Tina Turner, Amy Winehouse).

In 2011 he took part in the recording of the song Mazurski cud, created as part of the campaign "Mazury Cud Natury" (The Wonder of Nature in Masuria) to promote the region of Masuria.

In December 2011, he appeared in the multimedia spectacle 16.12.1981 directed by Łukasz Kobiela, which took place on the 30th anniversary of the pacification of the Wujek Coal Mine in Katowice. This "pacification" was the bloody suppression of a strike by mine workers in Katowice.

In 2019, Ryszard Rynkowski participated as a judge in the Polish TV show "Szansa na sukces" (A Chance for Success), a Polish equivalent of the German DSDS.

== Private life ==
His first wife Hanna died of breast cancer in 1996. This marriage produced a daughter, Marta (born 1978). In 2006 he remarried, after the new relationship remained a secret for a long time. He met his second wife, Edyta, 22 years younger, at a "Meet and Greet" after one of his concerts. In October 2008, his second child, son Ryszard Junior, was born. On 3 April 2009, the singer's first grandson was born, Jan and in 2010 his second grandson, Ignacy.

In 2002, the Elbląg city councillors granted him honorary citizenship of the city of Elbląg.

In 2005, he supported the election campaign of the PiS party and participated in the "Spring of Poles" concert series.

On the night of 15 to 16 November 2016, he threatened his family with suicide. The reason was marital problems and a resulting nervous breakdown. However, after talking to the police for a few minutes, the singer calmed down and handed over the gun to the officers. The pistol in his hand was loaded with live ammunition.

Due to the COVID-19 pandemic, Rynkowski, like many of his fellow musicians, was basically unemployed, which in turn plunged him into a deep emotional crisis. To make matters worse, the singer had been experiencing increasing problems with mobility in his hip for some time, which made him realise that he would no longer be able to perform larger concerts or even tours. In 2011, his wife Edyta was finally able to persuade him to invest the rest of his savings in a rehabilitation centre at his home Brodnica, where people with limb and spinal injuries are helped, thus guaranteeing him and his family, also for the future, a secure income.

== Discography ==
Alben

Year	Title	Position	ZPAV
Year	Title	Official list of sales	ZPAV
1991	Szczęśliwej drogi już czas: Publisher: Polskie Nagrania Muza	–	
1991	Una Luz en la Oscuridad: Publisher: Vede Records	–	
1995	Jedzie pociąg z daleka: Publisher: Agencja Artystyczna MTJ	–	
1995	Kolędy. Dziś nadzieja rodzi się: Publisher: Agencja Artystyczna MTJ	–	
1998	Jawa: Publisher: Pomaton EMI	-	Gold.
2000	Dary losu: Publisher: Pomaton EMI	6.	2× Platin
2001	Intymnie: Publisher: Pomaton EMI	3	Platin.
2002	Kolędy: Publisher: Pomaton EMI	30	
2003	Ten typ tak ma: Publisher: Pomaton EMI	3	
2009	Zachwyt: Publisher: Pomaton EMI	4: Gold	
2011	Ryszard Rynkowski: Publisher: EMI Music Poland	42	
2012	Razem: Publisher: EMI Music Poland	-	Gold
„—“: The item was not listed.

Compilations

Year	Title	Position	ZPAV
Year	Title	Official list of sales	ZPAV
1998	Złota kolekcja – Inny nie będę: Publisher: Pomaton EMI	13	2× Platin
2005	Złota kolekcja – Śpiewająco: Publisher: Pomaton EMI	–	
„—“ The item was not listed.

Single

Year	Title	Position
Year	Title	polish radio hit list
2001	Dziewczyny lubią brąz	35

== Musical ==
- Pan Twardowski – Musical, P 1993 Polonia Records, Polonia CD 014.

== Filmography ==
Year	Title	Role
2000	Zaduszki narodowe 2000. Sybir, ostatnie pożegnanie (National All Souls Day 2000. Siberia, the last farewell)	
1991	V.I.P.	"Fuks", Mr. Jeremy's bat
1990	Zabić na końcu (Kill at the end)	singer
1988	Alchemik (Alchemist)	Troubadour
1988	Alchemik Sendivius (Alchemist Sendivius) (Miniserie)	Troubadour

== Medals awarded ==
- 2002: Order of the Smile (Order Uśmiechu)
- 2010: Knight's Cross of the Order of Polonia Restituta (Order of Polonia Restituta)
- 2015: silver medal "Gloria Artis Medal for Cultural Merit" (Srebrny Medal "Zasłużony Kulturze Gloria Artis")
