= Zdzisława Sośnicka =

Polish singer (born 1945)

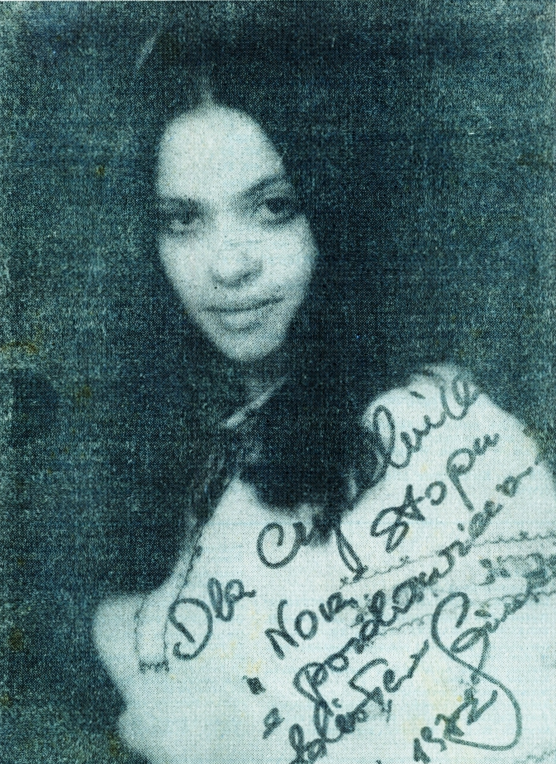
- Sośnicka in 1972

Background information
- Also known as: Barbara Bajer
- Born: 29 August 1945 (age 80); Kalisz, Poland
- Genres: Pop; pop rock; disco; funk; post-disco; rock
- Occupations: Musician, composer
- Instrument: Piano
- Years active: 1963–present
- Labels: Polskie Nagrania Muza; Sony Music Entertainment Poland; EMI Music Poland

Zdzisława Barbara Sośnicka (born 29 August 1945, in Kalisz) is a Polish singer who became popular in the 1970s and 1980s. She was awarded a Grand Prix at the 1988 National Festival of Polish Song in Opole for her entire body of work.

== Popular songs ==
- Dom, który mam (lyr. Jan Zalewski, mus. Marek Sewen)
- Taki dzień się zdarza raz (lyr. Jadwiga Urbanowicz, mus. Leszek Bogdanowicz, Barbara Bajer)
- Kochać znaczy żyć (lyr. Jonasz Kofta, mus. Barbara Bajer)
- Bez ciebie jesień (lyr. Jacek Bukowski, mus. Mikołaj Hertel)
- A kto się kocha w tobie (lyr. Bohdan Olewicz, mus. Andrzej Korzyński)
- Deszczowy wielbiciel (lyr. Jacek Cygan, mus. Seweryn Krajewski)
- Julia i ja (lyr. Bohdan Olewicz, mus. Marceli Trojan)
- Jak nazwać jutro bez ciebie (lyr. Janusz Kondratowicz, mus. Seweryn Krajewski)
- Żegnaj lato na rok (lyr. Bohdan Olewicz, mus. Wojciech Trzciński)
- Aleja gwiazd (lyr. Marek Dutkiewicz, mus. Romuald Lipko)
- Serce pali się raz (lyr. Marek Dutkiewicz, mus. Romuald Lipko)
- Człowiek nie jest sam (lyr. Jacek Cygan, mus. Wojciech Trzciński)
- Będzie co ma być (lyr. Marek Dutkiewicz, mus. Romuald Lipko)
- W kolorze krwi
- Naga noc
- Dobra miłość (orig. Andrzej i Eliza)
- Pamięć (Polish version of "Memory", Andrew Lloyd Webber)
- Nie czekaj mnie w Argentynie (Polish version of "Don't cry for me, Argentina", Andrew Lloyd Webber)
- Najzwyczajniej w świecie

== Discography ==
=== Albums ===
- 1972 Zdzisława Sośnicka
- 1974 Zdzisława Sośnicka 2
- 1977 Moja muzyka
- 1980 Odcienie samotności 2 LP
- 1984 Realia
- 1987 Aleja gwiazd
- 1989 Serce
- 1990 Musicale
- 1990 Musicals
- 1997 The best of Zdzisława Sośnicka
- 1998 Magia Serc
- 2000 Złota Kolekcja – Kochać, znaczy żyć
- 2014 – Antologia - Wydanie wznowionych 10 CD
- 2014 – Zaśpiewane - niewydane
- 2015 - Tańcz choćby płonął świat

=== Singles ===
- 1972 – Dom który mam / Codziennie pomyśl o mnie chociaż raz
- 1972 – Inne łzy / Tak niewiele mogę tobie dać
- 1974 – Nie ma drogi dalekiej / Taki dzień się zdarza raz
- 1974 – Inne łzy / Tak niewiele mogę tobie dać
- 1977 – Na nas czas / Żyj sobie sam
- 1977 – Jeden świat / Kochać znaczy żyć (Sopot '77)
- 1980 – Nie czekaj mnie w Argentynie / Pamiętam wczoraj
- 1980 – Raz na jakiś czas / W każdym moim śnie
- 1980 – Żegnaj lato na rok / Tak chciałabym twoją żoną być
- 1980 – A kto się kocha w Tobie / Nuda / Chcę być z tobą sam na sam / Czy to warto
- 1984 – Uczymy się żyć bez końca / Realia
- 1997 - Co ma być to będzie
- 2004 – Jak mamy żyć (with Tede)
- 2015 - Tańcz choćby płonął świat
- 2015 - Chodźmy stąd
