= Laura Samojłowicz =

Polish actress and singer

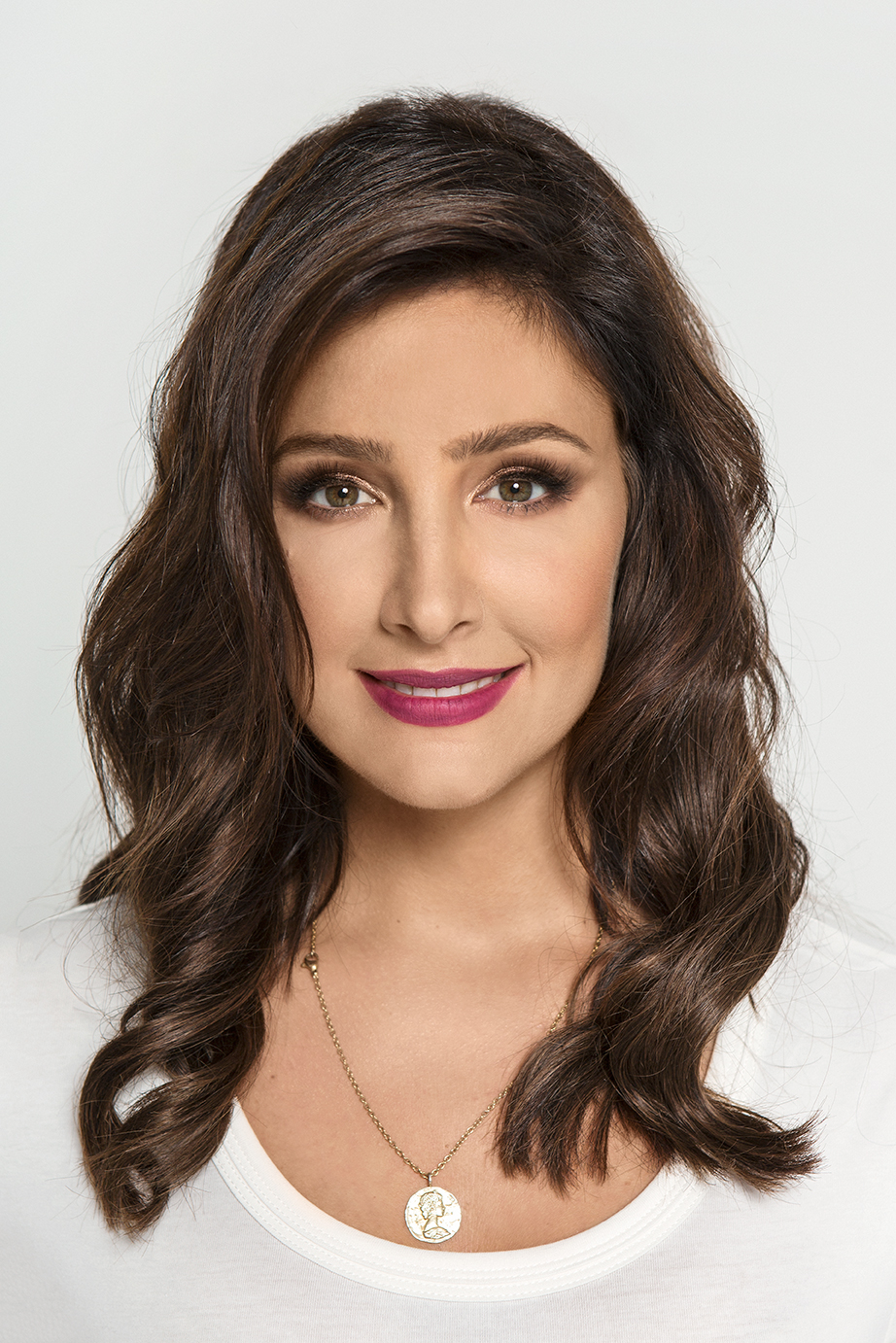
- Born: 14 February 1985 (age 41); Hamburg, West Germany
- Occupation: Actress
- Years active: 2007–present

Laura Samojłowicz (born 14 February 1985 in Hamburg, West Germany) is a Polish actress and singer. She was born in Germany. She and her family returned to Poland when she was 4 years old. She won season 5 of the Polish version of Soapstar Superstar.

She auditioned for 6th season of The Voice of Poland but failed to progress to the next round as none of the four coaches spun their chairs around.

== Filmography ==
Year	Title	Role	Notes
2007	Między nami	Girl	Short film
2007	Rodzina zastępcza plus	Girl in bed	1 episode
2007-2008	Egzamin z życia	Marlena	6 episodes
2007-2010 2021-2022	M jak miłość	Maja Chojnacka	85 episodes
2008	Trzeci oficer	Secretary	1 episode
2008	Wydział zabójstw	Anna Witkoś	1 episode
2009	Wódeczka i panienki	Cool chick	
2009	39 i pół	Samanta	3 episodes
2009	Akademia		1 episode
2009	Ojciec Mateusz	Gosia	1 episode
2010-2012	Hotel 52	Natalia Lipska	78 episodes
2011	Dancing for You	Julka	
