= Maria Niklińska =

Polish actress and singer

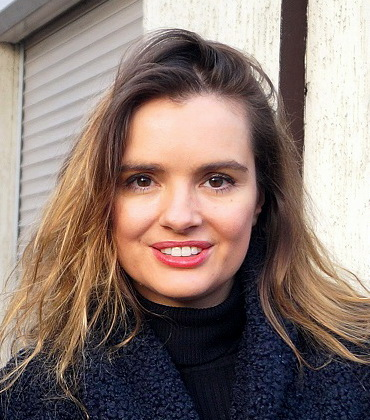
- Niklińska in 2018
- Born: 28 December 1983 (age 42); Warsaw, Poland
- Education: The Aleksander Zelwerowicz National Academy of Dramatic Art in Warsaw
- Occupations: actress, singer
- Musical career
- Genres: Pop
- Label: Universal Music Polska

Maria Niklińska (born 28 December 1983) is a Polish actress and singer. In 2003, she starred in the film An Ancient Tale: When the Sun Was a God directed by Jerzy Hoffman.

== Career ==
=== Acting activities ===
She made her acting debut as Es-toch in The Secret of Sagal. She has appeared in the following series: Klan (as Agata Wilczyńska), Pierwsza miłość (as Jagoda Borawska), Na dobre i na złe and Kryminalni. Her film debut was the role of Żywia in Jerzy Hoffman's An Ancient Tale: When the Sun Was a God. She also played Tosia in the movie Ja wam pokażę!

She played in the play Imieniny, dir. Aleksandra Konieczna at the National Theater in Warsaw and the impresario performance Tiramisu. She also played Ophelia in the play Hamlet 44, dir. Paweł Passini, made to commemorate the 64th anniversary of the outbreak of the Warsaw Uprising. She played Aniela in Śluby panieńskie, dir. Jan Englert at the National Theater, she also appeared in Václav Havel's Leaving, dir. Izabella Cywińska, staged at the Ateneum Theater in Warsaw. From February 14, 2010, she played in the play Pamiętnik cnotliwego rozpustnika (directed by Emilian Kamiński), staged at the Kamienica Theater.

At the Capitol Theater, she performed in the play Carmen, czyli sztuka na 10 telefonów komórkowych.

== Discography ==
Singles

- "Na północy" (2014, Universal Music Polska)
- "Na północy (remixy)" (2014, Universal Music Polska)

Music videos

- "Na północy" (2014, directed: Michał Braum)
