= Edyta Geppert =

Polish singer

- Geppert in 2025

Background information
- Born: 27 November 1953 (age 72)
- Origin: Nowa Ruda, Poland
- Genres: Sung poetry jazz
- Occupation: singer
- Years active: 1970s–present
- Labels: PolyGram Poland, Universal Music Poland, Agencja Artystyczna Edyta
- Website: Official Website of Edyta Geppert

Edyta Geppert (born 27 November 1953 in Nowa Ruda, Poland) is a popular Polish singer.

Geppert was born to a Polish father and Hungarian mother. She is married to Piotr Loretz. They have one son Mieczysław (born in 1988).

== Awards ==
- 1984 – Grand Prix at the National Festival of Polish Song in Opole for the song Jaka róża, taki cierń
- 1986 – Grand Prix at the National Festival of Polish Song in Opole for the song Och, życie, kocham cię nad życie
- 1995 – Grand Prix at the National Festival of Polish Song in Opole for the song Idź swoją drogą

== Discography ==
=== Studio albums ===
Title	Album details	Peak chart positions	Sales	Certifications
Title	Album details	POL	Sales	Certifications
Och, życie kocham cię nad życie	Released: 1986; Label: Arston/Polskie Nagrania; Formats: LP, CD	—		
Historie prawdziwe	Released: 1991; Label: ZPR Records; Formats: CD	—		
Follow The Call	Released: 1992; Label: ZPR Records; Formats: CD, CS	—		
Śpiewajmy	Released: 1994; Label: Kompania Muzyczna Pomaton; Formats: CD	—		
Pytania do księżyca	Released: 1997; Label: PolyGram Mercury; Formats: CD	—		
Pamiętnik, czyli kocham cię życie	Released: 1998; Label: ZPR Records; Formats: CD	—	POL: 50,000+	POL: Gold
Debiut	Released: 5 May 1999; Label: PolyGram Poland; Formats: CD	—		
Wierzę piosence	Released: 18 November 2002; Label: Universal Music Poland; Formats: CD	—		
Śpiewam życie (with Kroke)	Released: 2 October 2006; Label: Agencja Artystyczna Edyta/EMI; Formats: CD, digital download	11	POL: 15,000+	POL: Gold
Nic nie muszę – 25-Lecie	Released: 29 September 2008; Label: Agencja Artystyczna Edyta/EMI; Formats: CD	8	POL: 15,000+	POL: Gold
Święta z bajki	Released: 14 November 2011; Label: Agencja Artystyczna Edyta/EMI; Formats: CD	37		
"—" denotes a recording that did not chart or was not released in that territory.

=== Live albums ===
Title	Album details	Peak chart positions	Sales	Certifications
Title	Album details	POL	Sales	Certifications
Edyta Geppert Recital – Live	Released: 1986; Label: Pronit/P.Z. Polmark; Formats: LP, CD	—		
Moje królestwo (with Krzysztof Herdzin)	Released: 2 May 2006; Label: Agencja Artystyczna Edyta/EMI; Formats: CD	24	POL: 15,000+	POL: Gold
"—" denotes a recording that did not chart or was not released in that territory.
