= Maciej Jachowski =

Polish actor and singer

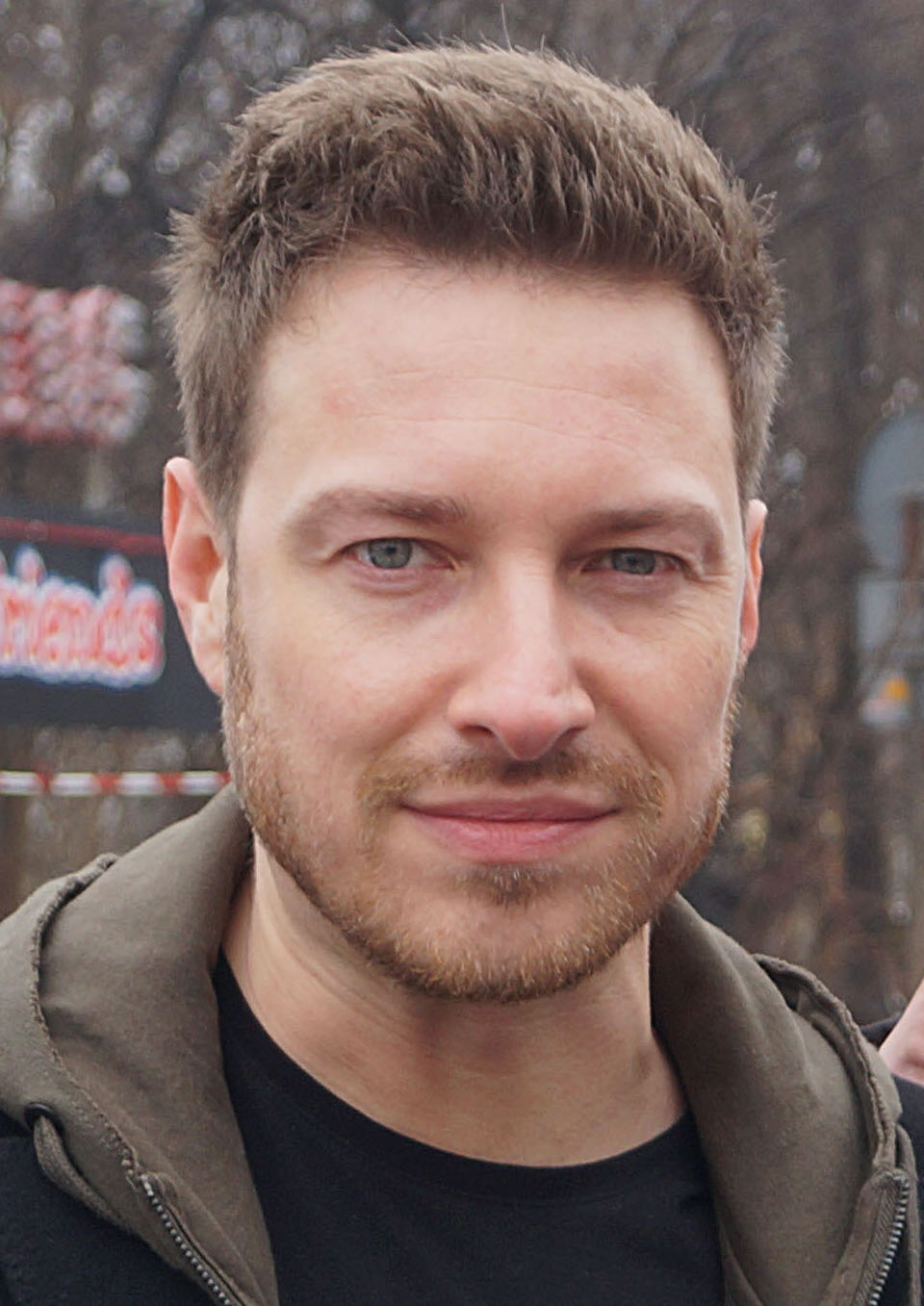
- Born: 8 July 1977 (age 48); Warsaw, Poland
- Occupation(s): Actor, singer
- Years active: 2006–present
- Website: www.maciejjachowski.pl/en

Maciej Jachowski (born 8 July 1977) is a Polish actor and singer.

== Career ==
His TV debut was in the dramatic documentary telenovela Sekcja 998 (TVP2, 2006). In the TVP2 soap opera M jak miłość, Jachowski plays Irek Podleśny, a colleague of Olga (Karolina Nowakowska). He has appeared in 39 i pół (TVN, 2009), Samo Życie (Polsat, 2009), and Na dobre i na złe (TVP2, 2010). In the soap opera Na Wspólnej (TVN, 2010), Jachowski plays the role of Piotr Czubak. He played the role of Krzysztof in the feature film Fenomen (2010).

Jachowski participated in the fifth edition of the Polsat entertainment show Jak oni śpiewają (2009), in which he finished in second place. He later appeared in the show's sixth edition titled Pojedynek Mistrzów (2010).

He participated in the twelfth edition of Taniec z gwiazdami, finishing last (14th place) with dance partner Janja Lesar.

== Filmography ==
Film roles
Title	Year	Role	Notes
Och, Karol 2	2011	Karol's office friend	
Fenomen	2010	Fenomen	

Television roles
Title	Year	Role	Notes
Na Wspólnej	2010–present	Piotr Czubak	
Na dobre i na złe	2010	Kamil	
Samo Życie	2009	illegal street car race participant (guest)	
39 i pół	2009	bank clerk (guest)	
M jak miłość	2007–present	Ireneusz Podleśny	
Sekcja 998	2006	team captain	
