= Jak oni śpiewają season 1 =

Jak oni śpiewają
- Season 1
- Hosted by: Katarzyna Cichopek; Krzysztof Ibisz
- Judges: Edyta Górniak; Rudi Schuberth; Elżbieta Zapendowska
- Winner: Agnieszka Włodarczyk
- Runner-up: Natasza Urbańska

Release
- Original network: Polsat
- Original release: March 3 – June 2, 2007

Season chronology
- Next → Season 2

The 1st season of Jak oni śpiewają, the Polish edition of Soapstar Superstar, started on March 3, 2007 and ended on June 2, 2007. It was broadcast by Polsat. Katarzyna Cichopek and Krzysztof Ibisz as the hosts, and the judges were: Edyta Górniak, Elżbieta Zapendowska and Rudi Schuberth.

== Stars ==
Celebrity	Character	Soap	Status
Piotr Szwedes	Tomasz Gabriel	"Złotopolscy" TVP2	Eliminated 1st on March 17, 2007
Dominika Figurska	Ewa Nowicka	"M jak miłość" TVP2	Eliminated 2nd on March 24, 2007
Małgorzata Lewińska	Patrycja Cwał-Wiśniewska	"Sąsiedzi" TVP1	Eliminated 3rd on March 31, 2007
Małgorzata Ostrowska-Królikowska	Grażyna Lubicz	"Klan" TVP1	Eliminated 4th on April 14, 2007
Marek Siudym	Władysław Biernacki	"Złotopolscy" TVP2	Eliminated 5th on April 21, 2007
Andrzej Nejman	Waldemar Złotopolski	"Złotopolscy" TVP2	Eliminated 6th on April 28, 2007
Łukasz Płoszajski	Artur Kulczycki	"Pierwsza miłość" Polsat	Eliminated 7th on May 5, 2007
Włodzimierz Matuszak	Antoni Wójtowicz	"Plebania" TVP1	Eliminated 8th on May 12, 2007
Marzena Sztuka	Halina Kiepska	"Świat według Kiepskich" Polsat	Eliminated 9th on May 19, 2007
Edyta Herbuś	Urszula	"Na Wspólnej" TVN	Eliminated 10th on May 26, 2007
Robert Moskwa	Artur Rogowski	"M jak miłość" TVP2	Third Place on June 2, 2007
Natasza Urbańska	Silene Arbekajte-Nawrocka	"Fala zbrodni" Polsat	Second Place on June 2, 2007
Agnieszka Włodarczyk	Weronika Potoczny	"Plebania" TVP1	Winners on June 2, 2007

== Guest Performances ==
Episode	Date	Artist(s)	Song(s)
3	March 17, 2007	Fergie	"Glamorous"
3	March 17, 2007	Fergie	"London Bridge"
11	May 19, 2007	Melanie C	"First Day of My Life"
11	May 19, 2007	Melanie C	"The Moment You Believe"
13	June 2, 2007	Edyta Górniak	"Stop"

== Scores ==
Couple	Place	1	2	3	4	5	6	7	8	9	10	11	12	13
Agnieszka Włodarczyk	1	–	4.0	5.0	6.0	5.8	5.0	5.4	5.3+6.0=11.3	5.8+6.0=11.8	6.0+6.0=12.0	6.0+6.0=12.0	5.3+5.6+6.0=16.9	5.3+5.3+5.5+6.0=22.1
Natasza Urbańska	2	–	5.0	5.4	6.0	5.0	5.9	6.0	5.7+6.0=11.7	5.8+5.9=11.7	5.3+5.0=10.3	6.0+6.0=12.0	6.0+6.0+6.0=18.0	5.5+5.8+6.0+5.8=23.1
Robert Moskwa	3	–	3.0	3.3	4.8	4.4	5.1	4.5	5.7+5.8=11.4	5.2+5.8=11.0	5.7+5.0=10.7	5.5+5.8=11.3	5.9+5.5+6.0=17.4	
Edyta Herbuś	4	–	3.8	3.8	3.6	3.7	4.5	5.3	4.7+3.0=7.7	3.0+5.3=8.3	4.2+4.3=8.5	3.7+5.0=8.7		
Marzena Sztuka	5	–	4.0	4.4	4.8	4.4	4.4	5.9	4.7+5.8=10.5	4.0+4.6=8.6	4.8+4.8=9.6	4.7		
Włodzimierz Matuszak	6	–	3.0	3.6	4.1	4.1	4.0	3.9	4.7+5.5=10.2	5.3+4.4=9.7	3.3			
Łukasz Płoszajski	7	–	3.0	3.4	3.1	3.6	4.9	4.6	4.7+5.1=9.8					
Andrzej Nejman	8	–	4.0	4.0	5.5	4.6	4.9	5.8	5.3					
Marek Siudym	9	–	4.3	4.5	5.5	5.6	5.4							
Małgorzata Ostrowska-Królikowska	10	–	3.3	4.3	5.0	3.9								
Małgorzata Lewińska	11	–	3.5	4.1	5.0									
Dominika Figurska	12	–	3.3	3.8										
Piotr Szwedes	13	–	3.5											

Red numbers indicate the lowest score for each week.
Green numbers indicate the highest score for each week.
indicates the star eliminated that week.
indicates the returning stars that finished in the bottom two.
indicates the star who has got immunitet

=== Average Chart ===
Place	Star	Average	Total	Best Score	Worst Score	Number of songs
1.	Natasza Urbańska	5.73	120.30	6.00	5.00	21
2.	Agnieszka Włodarczyk	5.58	117.10	6.00	4.00	21
3.	Marek Siudym	5.04	25.20	5.60	4.30	5
4.	Robert Moskwa	4.99	84.8	6.00	3.00	17
5.	Andrzej Nejman	4.85	33.90	5.70	4.00	7
6.	Marzena Kipiel-Sztuka	4.64	55.60	5.90	4.00	12
7.	Włodzimierz Matuszak	4.23	42.30	5.90	3.00	10
8.	Łukasz Płoszajski	4.15	33.20	5.10	3.00	8
9.	Małgorzata Lewińska	4.14	12.40	5.00	3.30	3
10.	Edyta Herbuś	4.13	57.80	5.20	3.00	14
11.	Małgorzata Ostrowska-Królikowska	4.08	16.30	5.00	3.30	4
12.	Piotr Szwedes	3.70	3.70	3.70	3.70	1
13.	Dominika Figurska	3.65	7.30	3.70	3.60	2
Evrystar		4.88	609.9	6.0	3.0	125

=== The Best Score (6.0) ===
No	Star	Song	Episode	6.0
2	Robert Moskwa	"Nie ma jak u mamy"	12	1
3	Agnieszka Włodarczyk	"Odkryjemy miłość nieznaną"	4	9
3	Agnieszka Włodarczyk	"Aleja gwiazd"	8	9
3	Agnieszka Włodarczyk	"I'm Outta Love"	9	9
3	Agnieszka Włodarczyk	"Deszcze niespokojne"	10	9
3	Agnieszka Włodarczyk	"Och życie, kocham Cię nad życie"	10	9
3	Agnieszka Włodarczyk	"Dziś prawdziwych cyganów już nie ma"	11	9
3	Agnieszka Włodarczyk	"I'm So Excited"	11	9
3	Agnieszka Włodarczyk	"Cudownych rodziców mam"	12	9
3	Agnieszka Włodarczyk	"Małe tęsknoty"	13	9
8	Natasza Urbańska	"Niech mówią, że to nie jest miłość"	4	9
8	Natasza Urbańska	"Bailamos"	7	9
8	Natasza Urbańska	"It's Raining Men"	8	9
8	Natasza Urbańska	"Jest taki samotny dom"	11	9
8	Natasza Urbańska	"Private Dancer"	11	9
8	Natasza Urbańska	"Czerwone korale"	12	9
8	Natasza Urbańska	"Who Wants to Live Forever"	12	9
8	Natasza Urbańska	"Mamo, nasza mamo"	12	9
8	Natasza Urbańska	"Diamonds Are a Girl's Best Friend"	13	9

== Episodes ==
=== Week 1 ===
Running order

Star	Score	Song
Andrzej Nejman	–	Ricky Martin – "She Bangs"
Robert Moskwa	–	Krzysztof Krawczyk & Goran Bregović – "Mój przyjacielu"
Agnieszka Włodarczyk	–	Anna Jantar – "Tyle słońca w całym mieście"
Piotr Szwedes	–	The Beatles – "Oh! Darling
Marzena Kipel-Sztuka	–	Jennifer Lopez – "Let's Get Loud"
Łukasz Płoszajski	–	Wilki – "Baśka"
Włodzimierz Matuszak	–	Budka Suflera – "Takie tango"
Natasza Urbańska	–	Bajm – "Józek nie daruję ci tej nocy"
Edyta Herbuś	–	Blue Café – "Do nieba, do piekła"
Małgorzata Ostrowska-Królikowska	–	Lombard – "Szklana pogoda"
Marek Siudym	–	Maciej Kossowski – "Wakacje z blondynką"
Dominika Figurska	–	Kayah & Goran Bregović – "Prawy do lewego"
Małgorzata Lewińska	–	Gloria Gaynor – "I Will Survive"

=== Week 2 ===
Individual judges scores in charts below (given in parentheses) are listed in this order from left to right: Edyta Górniak, Rudi Schuberth, Elżbieta Zapendowska.

Running order

Star	Score	Song
Dominika Figurska	3.3 (3,5,2)	Bonnie Tyler – "Holding Out for a Hero"
Marek Siudym	4.3 (4,5,4)	Toto Cutugno – "L'Italiano (Lasciate mi cantare)"
Edyta Herbuś	3.6 (4,6,1)	2+1 – "Chodź pomaluj mój świat"
Małgorzata Lewińska	3.6 (4,4,3)	Kayah – "Testosteron"
Agnieszka Włodarczyk	4.0 (3,5,4)	Kylie Minogue – "In Your Eyes"
Łukasz Płoszajski	3.0 (2,5,2)	Czarno Czarni – "Nogi"
Piotr Szwedes	3.6 (3,5,3)	Tom Jones – "Sex Bomb"
Małgorzata Ostrowska-Królikowska	3.3 (2,5,3)	Varius Manx – "Piosenka księżycowa"
Robert Moskwa	3.0 (1,6,2)	The Blues Brothers – "Everybody Needs Somebody to Love"
Natasza Urbańska	5.0 (4,6,5)	Wham!- "Wake Me Up Before You Go-Go"
Włodzimierz Matuszak	3.0 (2,5,2)	Krzysztof Kiljański & Kayah – "Prócz ciebie nic"
Andrzej Nejman	4.0 (5,4,3)	Lou Bega – "Mambo No. 5"
Marzena Kipel-Sztuka	4.0 (4,5,3)	Bajm – "Biała armia"

=== Week 3 ===
Individual judges scores in charts below (given in parentheses) are listed in this order from left to right: Edyta Górniak, Elżbieta Zapendowska, Rudi Schuberth, Piotr Szwedes.

Running order

Star	Score	Song
Małgorzata Lewińska	4.1 (4,2.5,5,5)	Ray Charles – "Hit the Road Jack"
Robert Moskwa	3.2 (2,2,5,4)	Joe Cocker – "You Are So Beautiful"
Małgorzata Ostrowska-Królikowska	4.2 (4,3,5,5)	Skaldowie – "Wszystko mi mówi, że mnie ktoś pokochał"
Marzena Kipel-Sztuka	4.3 (4,3.5,5,5)	Krystyna Prońko – "Jesteś lekiem na całe zło"
Włodzimierz Matuszak	3.6 (2,2.5,5,5)	Domenico Modugno – "Volare"
Natasza Urbańska	5.3 (5,4.5,6,6)	Krzysztof Krawczyk & Edyta Bartosiewicz- "Trudno tak"
Marek Siudym	4.5 (4,4.5,4.5,5)	Ryszard Rynkowski – "Wypijmy za błędy"
Agnieszka Włodarczyk	5.0 (6,5,4,5)	Madonna – "La Isla Bonita"
Andrzej Nejman	4.0 (4,2,5,5)	Michael Bolton – "When a Man Loves a Woman"
Łukasz Płoszajski	3.3 (3.5,2.5,3.5,4)	Szymon Wydra – "Życie jak poemat"
Dominika Figurska	3.7 (4,2,4,5)	Virgin – "Szansa"
Edyta Herbuś	3.7 (4,2,5,4)	Emilia Rydberg – "Big Big World"

=== Week 4 ===
Individual judges scores in charts below (given in parentheses) are listed in this order from left to right: Edyta Górniak, Elżbieta Zapendowska, Rudi Schuberth, Dominika Figurska.

Running order

Star	Score	Song
Małgorzata Ostrowska-Królikowska	5.0 (4,4,6,6)	Maanam – "Boskie Buenos"
Andrzej Nejman	5.5 (6,4,6,6)	Robbie Williams – "Feel"
Edyta Herbuś	3.6 (3,2.5,5,4)	Urszula – "Konik na biegunach"
Łukasz Płoszajski	3.1 (3,1.5,4,4)	The Police – "Every Breath You Take"
Włodzimierz Matuszak	4.1 (3.5,3,5,5)	Lady Pank – "Mniej niż zero"
Agnieszka Włodarczyk	6.0 (6,6,6,6)	Alicja Majewska – "Odkryjemy miłość nieznaną"
Małgorzata Lewińska	5.0 (5,4,5,6)	Maryla Rodowicz – "Małgośka"
Robert Moskwa	4.7 (3.5,3.5,6,6)	K.A.S.A. – "Macho"
Marzena Kipel-Sztuka	4.7 (4.5,4.5,5,5)	Anna Jantar – "Nic nie może wiecznie trwać"
Marek Siudym	5.5 (6,5,5,6)	Kombii – "Pokolenie"
Natasza Urbańska	6.0 (6,6,6,6)	Olga Szomańska & Przemysław Branny – "Niech mówią, że to nie jest miłość"
Dominika Figurska	–	Shakira – "Whenever, Wherever"

=== Week 5 ===
Individual judges scores in charts below (given in parentheses) are listed in this order from left to right: Edyta Górniak, Elżbieta Zapendowska, Rudi Schuberth, Małgorzata Lewińska.

Running order

Star	Score	Song
Andrzej Nejman	4.6 (4,4,5,5.5)	"Smooth" - Santana & Rob Thomas
Robert Moskwa	4.3 (4,3.5,5,5)	"Nie dokazuj" - Marek Grechuta
Agnieszka Włodarczyk	5.7 (6,5,6,6)	"Co Mi Panie Dasz?" - Bajm
Marzena Kipel-Sztuka	4.3 (4,3,5,5.5)	"Black Velvet" - Alannah Myles
Łukasz Płoszajski	3.6 (3,2.5,5,4)	"Love Me Tender" - Elvis Presley
Włodzimierz Matuszak	4.1 (4.5,3,5,4)	"Felicitá" - Al Bano & Romina Power
Natasza Urbańska	5.0 (4,6,5,5)	"Kiedy powiem sobie dość" - O.N.A.
Edyta Herbuś	3.7 (5,2,5,3)	"Oko za oko" - Justyna Steczkowska
Małgorzata Ostrowska-Królikowska	3.8 (3,3,5,4.5)	"Wszystko czego dziś chcę" - Izabela Trojanowska
Marek Siudym	5.6 (6,4.5,6,6)	"New York City" - Frank Sinatra

=== Week 6 ===
Individual judges scores in charts below (given in parentheses) are listed in this order from left to right: Edyta Górniak, Elżbieta Zapendowska, Rudi Schuberth, Małgorzata Ostrowska-Królikowska.

Running order

Star	Score	Song
Andrzej Nejman	4.8 (4.5,4,5,6)	Danzel – "Pump It Up!"
Robert Moskwa	5.1 (5,3.5,6,6)	La Bamba – "Los Lobos"
Agnieszka Włodarczyk	5.0 (4,4,6,6)	Czesław Niemen – "Sen o Warszawie"
Marzena Kipel-Sztuka	4.3 (4,2.5,5,6)	Las Ketchup – "The Ketchup Song (Asereje)"
Łukasz Płoszajski	4.8 (5,3.5,5,6)	The Beatles – "All My Loving"
Włodzimierz Matuszak	4.0 (3.5,2.5,4,6 )	Bogusław Mec – "Jej portret"
Natasza Urbańska	5.8 (6,5.5,6,6)	Uniting Nations – "Ai No Corrida"
Edyta Herbuś	5.2 (6,3,6,6)	Kasia Klich – "Lepszy model"
Marek Siudym	5.3 (5,4.5,6,6 )	Stachursky – "Typ niepokorny"

=== Week 7 ===
Individual judges scores in charts below (given in parentheses) are listed in this order from left to right: Edyta Górniak, Elżbieta Zapendowska, Rudi Schuberth, Marek Siudym.

Running order

Star	Score	Song
Andrzej Nejman	5.7 (6,5,6,6)	Seweryn Krajewski – "Uciekaj serce moje"
Robert Moskwa	4.5 (4,3,5,6)	Czesław Niemen – "Płonąca stodoła"
Agnieszka Włodarczyk	5.3 (5,4.5,6,6)	Maryla Rodowicz – "Niech żyje bal"
Marzena Kipel-Sztuka	5.9 (6,5.5,6,6)	Vaya Con Dios – "Nah Neh Nah"
Łukasz Płoszajski	4.8 (4,4.5,5,6)	Kombii – "Nasze Randez-Vous"
Włodzimierz Matuszak	3.8 (3,2.5,4,6)	Budka Suflera- "Jolka, Jolka, pamiętasz"
Natasza Urbańska	6.0 (6,6,6,6)	Enrique Iglesias – "Bailamos"
Edyta Herbuś	5.2 (6,3.5,5.5,6)	Reni Jusis – "Kiedyś cię znajdę"

=== Week 8 ===
Individual judges scores in charts below (given in parentheses) are listed in this order from left to right: Edyta Górniak, Elżbieta Zapendowska, Rudi Schuberth.

Running order

Star	Score	Song
Andrzej Nejman & Agnieszka Włodarczyk	5.3 (6,4,6)	Edyta Górniak & Mietek Szcześniak – "Dumka na dwa serca"
Robert Moskwa & Natasza Urbańska	5.6 (6,5,6)	Gipsy Kings – "Bamboleo"
Łukasz Płoszajski & Edyta Herbuś	4.6 (6,3,5)	Mezo Tabb & Kasia Wilk – "Sacrum"
Włodzimierz Matuszak & Marzena Kipel-Sztuka	4.6 (6,4,4)	Jan Pietrzak- "Czy te oczy mogą kłamać"

Individual judges scores in charts below (given in parentheses) are listed in this order from left to right: Edyta Górniak, Elżbieta Zapendowska, Rudi Schuberth, Andrzej Nejman.

Running order

Star	Score	Song
Robert Moskwa	5.7 (6,5,6,6)	Golec uOrkiestra – "Słodycze"
Agnieszka Włodarczyk	6.0 (6,6,6 6)	Zdzisława Sośnicka – "Aleja gwiazd"
Marzena Kipel-Sztuka	5.7 (6,5,6,6)	Ivan i Delfin – "Jej czarne oczy"
Łukasz Płoszajski	5.1 (6,4.5,5,5)	Frank Sinatra – "Strangers in the Night"
Włodzimierz Matuszak	5.5 (6,4,6,6)	Marino Marini – "Nie płacz, kiedy odjadę"
Natasza Urbańska	6.0 (6,6,6 6)	Geri Halliwell – "It's Raining Men"
Edyta Herbuś	3.0 (3,1,4,4)	Britney Spears – "Born to Make You Happy"

=== Week 9 ===
Individual judges scores in charts below (given in parentheses) are listed in this order from left to right: Edyta Górniak, Elżbieta Zapendowska, Rudi Schuberth.

Running order

Star	Score	Song
Robert Moskwa	5.1 (5,4.5,6)	Czerwone Gitary – "Tak bardzo się starałem"
Agnieszka Włodarczyk	5.8 (6,5.5,6)	ABBA – "The Winner Takes It All"
Marzena Kipel-Sztuka	4.0 (6,3,3)	ABBA – "Money, Money, Money"
Łukasz Płoszajski		Oddział Zamknięty – "Andzia i ja"
Włodzimierz Matuszak	5.3 (6,4,6 )	Czerwone Gitary – "Historia jednej znajomości"
Natasza Urbańska	5.8 (6,6,5.5)	ABBA – "Waterloo"
Edyta Herbuś	3.0 (2,2,5)	ABBA – "Mamma Mia"

Individual judges scores in charts below (given in parentheses) are listed in this order from left to right: Edyta Górniak, Elżbieta Zapendowska, Łukasz Płoszajski.

Running order

Star	Score	Song
Robert Moskwa	5.7 (6,5,6,6)	Kult – "Gdy nie ma dzieci"
Agnieszka Włodarczyk	6.0 (6,6,6,6)	Anastacia – "I'm Outta Love"
Marzena Kipel-Sztuka	4.6 (5,5,4.5,5)	Bonnie Tyler – "It's a Heartache"
Włodzimierz Matuszak	4.3 (4,3.5,5,5)	Krzysztof Krawczyk – "Parostatek"
Natasza Urbańska	5.8 (6,6,5.5,6)	Łzy – "Oczy szeroko zamknięte"
Edyta Herbuś	5.2 (6,3,6,6)	Vanessa Paradis – "Joe le taxi"

=== Week 10 ===
Individual judges scores in charts below (given in parentheses) are listed in this order from left to right: Edyta Górniak, Elżbieta Zapendowska, Rudi Schuberth.

Running order

Star	Score	Song
Robert Moskwa	5.6 (6,5,6)	Andrzej Rosiewicz – "Czterdzieści lat minęło" from "Czterdziestolatek"
Agnieszka Włodarczyk	6.0 (6,6,6)	Edmund Fetting – "Deszcze niespokojne" from "Czterej pancerni i pies"
Marzena Kipel-Sztuka	4.8 (5,4.5,5)	Stachursky – "Samo życie" from "Samo życie"
Włodzimierz Matuszak		Ryszard Rynkowski – "Życie jest nowelą" from "Klan"
Natasza Urbańska	5.3 (4,6,6)	Halina Kunicka – "Od nocy do nocy" from "Noce i dnie"
Edyta Herbuś	4.1 (3.5,4,5)	Anna Jurksztowicz – "Na dobre i na złe" from "Na dobre i na złe"

Individual judges scores in charts below (given in parentheses) are listed in this order from left to right: Edyta Górniak, Elżbieta Zapendowska, Rudi Schuberth, Włodimierz Matuszak

Running order

Star	Score	Song
Robert Moskwa	5.0 (5,5,5,5)	Elton John – "I'm Still Standing"
Agnieszka Włodarczyk	6.0 (6,6,6,6)	Edyta Geppert – "Och życie, kocham Cię nad życie"
Marzena Kipel-Sztuka	4.7 (4,5,5,5)	Bananarama – "Venus"
Natasza Urbańska	5.0 (2,6,6,6)	Michael Jackson – "Billie Jean"
Edyta Herbuś	4.2 (5,2,5,5)	Alizée – "Moi Lolita"

=== Week 11 ===
Individual judges scores in charts below (given in parentheses) are listed in this order from left to right: Edyta Górniak, Elżbieta Zapendowska, Rudi Schuberth.

Running order

Star	Score	Song
Robert Moskwa	4.3 (4,4,5)	Patrycja Markowska – "Kołysanka"
Agnieszka Włodarczyk	6.0 (6,6,6)	Maryla Rodowicz – "Dziś prawdziwych cyganów już nie ma"
Marzena Kipel-Sztuka	4.6 (5,4,5)	Szymon Wydra – "Teraz wiem"
Natasza Urbańska	6.0 (6,6,6)	Budka Suflera – "Jest taki samotny dom"
Edyta Herbuś	3.6 (4,2,5)	Ich Troje – "A wszystko to... (bo ciebie kocham)!"

Individual judges scores in charts below (given in parentheses) are listed in this order from left to right: Edyta Górniak, Elżbieta Zapendowska, Rudi Schuberth, Marzena Kipel-Sztuka

Running order

Star	Score	Song
Robert Moskwa	5.7 (6,5,6,6)	Kazik Staszewski & Yugoton – "Malcziki"
Agnieszka Włodarczyk	6.0 (6,6,6,6)	Pointer Sisters – "I'm So Excited"
Natasza Urbańska	6.0 (6,6,6,6)	Tina Turner – "Private Dancer"
Edyta Herbuś	5.0 (6,3,5,6)	Goya – "Smak słów"

=== Week 12 ===
Individual judges scores in charts below (given in parentheses) are listed in this order from left to right: Edyta Górniak, Elżbieta Zapendowska, Rudi Schuberth, Edyta Herbuś

Running order

Star	Score	Song
Robert Moskwa	5.8 (6,5.5,6,6)	Skaldowie – "Prześliczna wiolonczelistka"
Robert Moskwa	5.5 (5,5,6,6)	Smash Mouth – "I'm a Believer"
Robert Moskwa	6.0 (6,6,6,6)	Wojciech Młynarski – "Nie ma jak u mamy"
Agnieszka Włodarczyk	5.3 (4,5.5,6,6)	Madonna – "Like a Prayer"
Agnieszka Włodarczyk	5.6 (5,5.5,6,6)	Banda i Wanda – "Hi-Fi"
Agnieszka Włodarczyk	6.0 (6,6,6,6)	Urszula Sipińska – "Cudownych rodziców mam"
Natasza Urbańska	6.0 (6,6,6,6)	Brathanki – "Czerwone korale"
Natasza Urbańska	6.0 (6,6,6,6)	Queen – "Who Wants to Live Forever"
Natasza Urbańska	6.0 (6,6,6,6)	Niebiesko-Czarni – "Mamo, nasza mamo"

=== Week 13 ===
Individual judges scores in charts below (given in parentheses) are listed in this order from left to right: Edyta Górniak, Elżbieta Zapendowska, Rudi Schuberth, Robert Moskwa

Running order

Star	Score	Song
Agnieszka Włodarczyk	5.2 (6,3,6,6)	Hanka Ordonówna – "Miłość Ci wszystko wybaczy"
Agnieszka Włodarczyk	5.2 (5,4,6,6)	Bonnie Tyler – "Holding Out for a Hero"
Agnieszka Włodarczyk	5.5 (5,5,6,6)	"Canción del Mariachi" from Desperado
Agnieszka Włodarczyk	6.0 (6,6,6,6)	Krystyna Prońko – "Małe tęsknoty"
Natasza Urbańska	5.5 (6,4,6,6)	Hanka Ordonówna – "Na pierwszy znak"
Natasza Urbańska	5.7 (6,5,6,6)	Santana & Rob Thomas – "Smooth"
Natasza Urbańska	6.0 (6,6,6,6)	Marilyn Monroe – "Diamonds Are a Girl's Best Friend"
Natasza Urbańska	5.7 (5,6,6,6)	James Brown – "I Feel Good"

Other Performance

Running order

Star	Song
Robert Moskwa	Jerzy Stuhr – "Śpiewać każdy może"
Dominika Figurska & Łukasz Płoszajski	Goran Bregović & Kayah – "Prawy do lewego"
Małgorzata Lewińska & Marek Siudym	Frank Sinatra – "New York City"
Marzena Kipel-Sztuka & Andrzej Nejman	Alannah Myles – "Black Velvet"
Edyta Herbuś & Włodzimierz Matuszak	Al Bano & Romina Power – "Felicitá"
Małgorzata Ostrowska-Królikowska & Piotr Szwedes	Andrzej Dąbrowski – "Andrzej Dąbrowski"

== Rating Figures ==
Episode	Date	Official rating 4+	Share
1	March 3, 2007	5 689 616	35,39%
2	March 10, 2007	5 034 580	31,43%
3	March 17, 2007	4 824 807	30,20%
4	March 24, 2007	4 598 613	28,50%
5	March 31, 2007	4 565 689	30,58%
6	April 14, 2007	4 134 708	29,81%
7	April 21, 2007	3 798 140	25,47%
8	April 28, 2007	4 244 063	32,48%
9	May 5, 2007	4 204 654	30,15%
10	May 12, 2007	4 726 703	32,99%
11	May 19, 2007	3 949 779	32,58%
12	May 26, 2007	3 708 186	30,51%
13	June 2, 2007	4 977 556	34,98%
Average	–	4 507 262	31,19%
