= Perepeczko =

Perepeczko (Polish pronunciation: [pɛrɛˈpɛt͡ʂkɔ]) is a Polish surname. It may refer to:

- Agnieszka Perepeczko (born 1942), a Polish actress
- Andrzej Perepeczko, a Polish Naval officer, writer and publicist
- Marek Perepeczko (1942–2005), a Polish movie and theatre actor
