= Agnieszka Włodarczyk =

Polish actress and singer (born 1980)

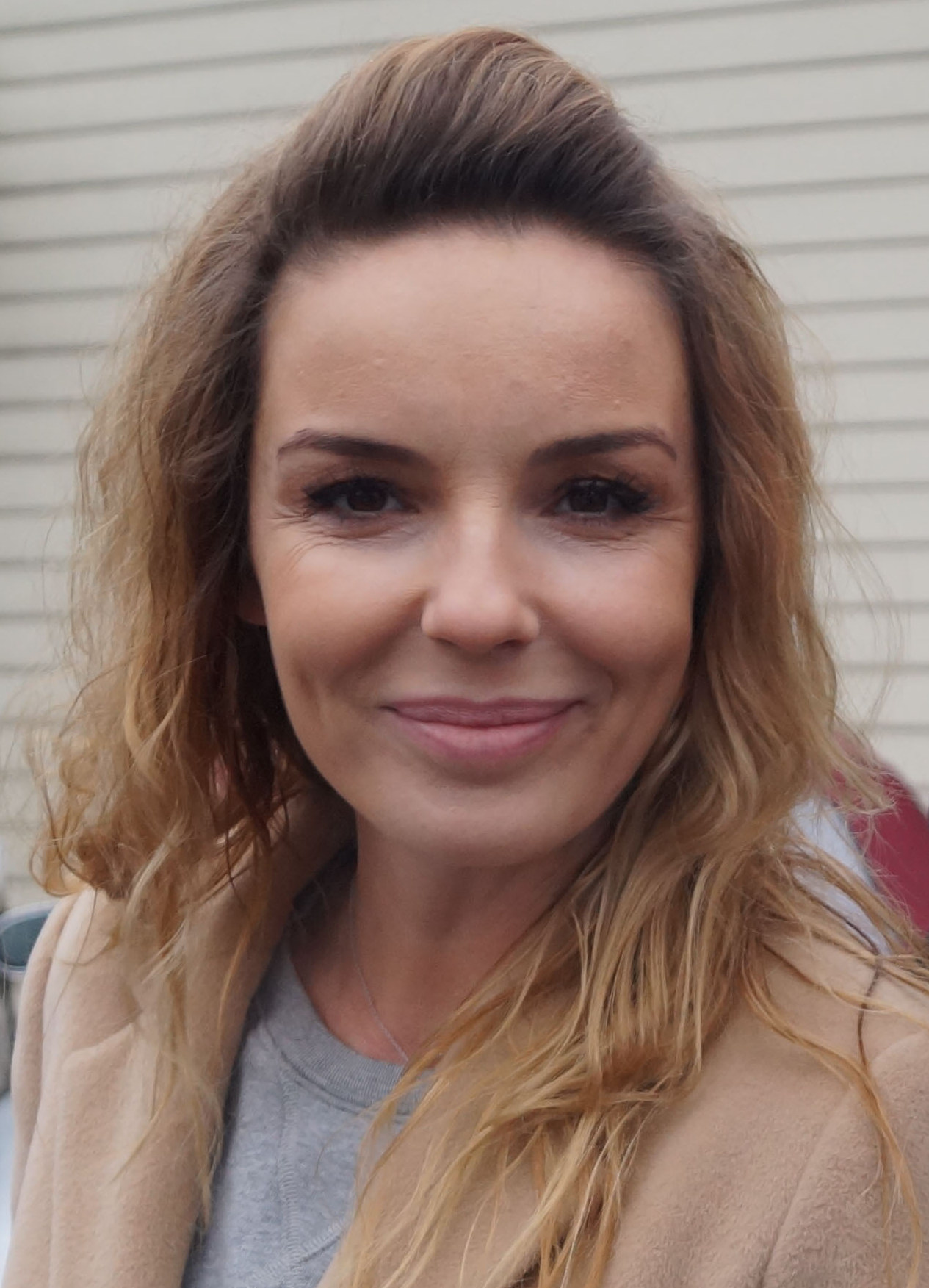
- Włodarczyk in 2017
- Born: 13 December 1980 (age 45); Sławno, Poland
- Occupations: Actress; singer
- Years active: 1995–present
- Spouse: Robert Karaś (m. 2023)
- Children: 1
- Musical career
- Genres: Pop
- Instrument: Vocals
- Label: My Music

Agnieszka Włodarczyk (Polish pronunciation: [aɡˈɲɛʂka vwɔˈdart͡ʂɨk]; born 13 December 1980) is a Polish actress and singer. As an actress, she is best known for her roles in the film Sara (1997) and the sitcom 13 posterunek (1997–2000). In 2007, she released her debut album, Nie dla oka....

== Early life ==
Włodarczyk was born on 13 December 1980 in Sławno. Her parents divorced when she was two years old, and afterwards, she stayed in the care of her mother, Anna Stasiukiewicz. They moved from town to town before settling in Warsaw. Stasiukiewicz remarried and had a son, Robert, with her second husband. Włodarczyk completed secondary education earning a maturity diploma.

== Career ==
In March 1996, Włodarczyk was cast by Janusz Józefowicz in the play Tyle miłości at Studio Buffo theatre in Warsaw. The same year, she had a part in the music video for the song "Reklama" by Polish singer K.A.S.A.. Her breakthrough came in 1997 when she starred in Maciej Ślesicki's film Sara alongside Marek Perepeczko, Bogusław Linda and Cezary Pazura. She won the 1999 Stozhary Award for Best Debut.

Włodarczyk played the role of Agnieszka in the Polish sitcom 13 posterunek. The first season ran from 1997 to 1998 and was a ratings success in Poland. Its second season was released in 2000. The same year, she had a small part in the film Pierwszy milion, and made guest appearances in the soap opera Na dobre i na złe and the comedy series Świat według Kiepskich. In 2001 and 2003, she starred in the television series Zostać miss. Also in 2001, she accepted the part of Wiki Potoczny in the Polish soap opera Plebania. She followed this with roles in a number of commercially successful Polish films, including E=mc² (2002) and Nigdy w życiu! (2004), and a leading role in the television series Dziki (2004) and its sequel Dziki 2. Pojedynek (2005).

In 2005, Włodarczyk was a contestant on the first season of Taniec z gwiazdami, the Polish version of Dancing with the Stars, where she finished in seventh place. From March to June 2007, she participated in season one of the celebrity singing competition Jak oni śpiewają, which was the Polish version of Soapstar Superstar. She won the show with over 60% of all votes, and on 30 November 2007, she released her debut studio album, entitled Nie dla oka.... Although the first single "Zawsze byłam" became a hit in Poland, the album underperformed and received mixed reviews. In 2008, she took part in the third season of the television show Gwiazdy tańczą na lodzie, the Polish version of Dancing on Ice, and finished as a runner-up.

Between 2009 and 2012, Włodarczyk appeared in the television series Pierwsza miłość. 2011 saw the release of her Christmas album Najpiękniejsze polskie kolędy, and in 2012, she appeared in the film Kac Wawa. In 2014, she competed in the Polish version of Your Face Sounds Familiar, called Twoja twarz brzmi znajomo, where she finished second. She also took part in the first season of the Polish reality show Azja Express with actress Maria Konarowska in 2016. They came in second place.

== Personal life ==
Włodarczyk was in relationships with television presenter Rafał Kosiński, entrepreneur Jakub Sićko, and actor Mikołaj Krawczyk. In 2020, she began dating Polish triathlete Robert Karaś. She gave birth to their son, Milan, on 7 July 2021. They married in 2023.

== Filmography ==
=== Film ===
- Sara (1997)
- Pierwszy million (2000)
- Poranek kojota (2001)
- Rób swoje, ryzyko jest twoje (2002)
- E=mc² (2002)
- Nigdy w życiu! (2004)
- Job, czyli ostatnia szara komórka (2006)
- Kac Wawa (2012)
- Diablo. Wyścig o wszystko (2019)

=== Television ===
- 13 posterunek (1997–1998)
- Pierwszy million (2000)
- 13 posterunek 2 (2000)
- Zostać miss (2001)
- Plebania (2001–2012)
- Zostać miss 2 (2003)
- Dziki (2004)
- Talki z resztą (2005)
- Czego się boją faceci, czyli seks w mniejszym mieście (2005)
- Dziki 2. Pojedynek (2005)
- Ja wam pokażę! (2007)
- Pierwsza miłość (2009–2012)
- My baby (2011)

== Discography ==
=== Studio albums ===
Title	Album details	Peak chart positions	Certifications
Title	Album details	POL	Certifications
Nie dla oka...	Released: 30 November 2007; Label: My Music; Formats: CD	21	ZPAV: Gold
Najpiękniejsze polskie kolędy	Released: 22 December 2011; Label: My Music; Formats: CD, digital download	—	
"—" denotes a recording that did not chart or was not released in that territory.

=== Maxi singles ===
Title	Album details	Certifications
Jak oni śpiewają	Released: 6 June 2007; Label: Agora; Formats: CD	ZPAV: Platinum
