= 13 posterunek =

- Genre: Sitcom
- Created by: Maciej Ślesicki
- Starring: Cezary Pazura; Marek Perepeczko; Aleksandra Woźniak; Marek Walczewski; Piotr Zelt; Agnieszka Włodarczyk; Dorota Chotecka
- Composer: Przemysław Gintrowski
- Country of origin: Poland
- Original language: Polish
- No. of seasons: 2
- No. of episodes: 83

Production
- Executive producers: Heritage Films; Lew Rywin; Canal+ Polska
- Production companies: Canal+ Polska; Heritage Films

Original release
- Network: Canal+ Polska
- Release: December 24, 1997 – December 31, 2000

13 posterunek (translation from Polish: 13th Precinct) is a Polish sitcom series directed and scripted by Maciej Ślesicki, starring Cezary Pazura and Marek Perepeczko. Two seasons have been produced – the first consists of 41 episodes and the second of 42 episodes.

== Plot ==
The series is focused on clumsy policemen working at a small police station on Warsaw's outskirts.

== Cast ==
- Cezary Pazura as Deputy Cezary "Czarek" Cezary - the main character of the series, a nervous, eccentric and unpleasant policeman who always gets in troubles while trying to solve problems. He was previously in a relationship with his classmate Jola who currently works as a prostitute. Czarek joins the group in the first episode and is mistaken for being the new precinct chief. Because of his attitude he's always in the Chief's bad book and is promised to never get promoted. He is an orphan and has two sisters - a twin one and a younger one named Agnieszka of whom he has custody and who is a high school student. Initially Czarek doesn't reciprocate Kasia's feelings towards him, but eventually falls in love with her in episode 29. He is the only character to appear in all episodes. According to Cezary Pazura Czarek's personality was inspired by John Cleese's character Basil Fawlty, while his portrayal is based mainly on Jim Carrey and Charlie Chaplin.
- Marek Perepeczko as Captain Władysław "Władek" Słoik - the chief of the station who is in love with his bulldog named Pershing. He is a widower and a communist and has his position due to contacts. He once saved Bolesław Bierut's life with a heavy machinegun stored in the station. He doesn't like Czarek from the beginning and tries anything to get rid of him. Has a poster of Janosik in his office, which is an allusion to Perepeczko's most famous role. The Chief appears in both seasons.
- Aleksandra Woźniak as Sr. Deputy Kasia - the main female character of the show, Kasia is a beautiful but not very smart policewoman with background in nursing. She falls in love with Czarek at first sight and does anything to get in a relationship with him. In the second season she is promoted to Senior Sergeant. She eventually becomes Czarek's girlfriend and gets pregnant with his child. Kasia appears in both seasons.
- Marek Walczewski as Sr. Aspirant Stępień - an alcoholic deputy chief and the oldest of the group. He has enormous sight problems such as daltonism and extreme myopia (-40 diopter), causing him to wear binoculars with glasses similar to those used for drink shots. Stępień also has problems with his second wife and constantly wants to split up with her. He was previously the best cop in the Homicide Bureau of the Capital Police Station, but was removed to the Station 13 to wait for the retirement. In the last episode of the Season One, Czarek and Kasia decided to give him their reward for hunting a wanted criminal to fund Stępień's eye treatment in America, which actually revealed to be a scam. Eventually Stępień retires from the job by the decision of his higher-ups (much to his dismay) and is replaced by Rysio as the new deputy chief. Despite that he sometimes visits the station. He appears in both seasons.
- Piotr Zelt as Sr. Deputy Arnold "Arnie" - a not-too-bright musclehead with a heart of gold. His name and appearance are based on Arnold Schwarzenegger action movie persona, of whom he is a big fan, while his way of speaking is based on Schwarzenegger's character T-800. It was said that Arnie is a Jehova's Witness and hails from Poznań. He appears in both series.
- Paweł Burczyk as Sr. Deputy Luksus - a womanizer and a pervert but a good colleague of Czarek. He appears only in the first season.
- Ewa Szykulska as Sergeant Zofia (1st Zofia) - she is a lover of The Chief. She was assigned to the Capital Police Headquarters in episode 8, but sometimes visits her old place as a controller. She appears only in the first season.
- Joanna Sienkiewicz as Sergeant Zofia (2nd Zofia) - she replaced the 1st Zofia and is also a lover of The Chief. She appears only in the first season.
- Arkadiusz Jakubik as Aspirant Rysio - a curly-haired former mine sweeper with a prosthetic left arm and a hearing aid who joins the squad in the episode 43 as the new deputy chief in the place of Stępień and Luksus. Rysio is a pyromaniac, who likes to give alight bombs or other explosives to every person he mets. He used to study medicine but dropped out to become a minesweeper. He doesn't get along with Czarek and Arnie. Has a relationship with Jola. He appears only in the second season.
- Joanna Jędrejek as Sr. Deputy Andżelika - an attractive policewoman from Płock who replaced Zofia in the second season, but appeared in two episodes of the first one. She was a candidate for Miss of Police, what started a mutual dislike with Kasia. She is also Chief's lover.
- Agnieszka Włodarczyk as Agnieszka Cezary - beautiful teenage sister of Czarek, under his legal guardianship. She often bunks off school and goes to the station for sick notes. Agnieszka mutually dislikes her brother, who rejects every boy she starts dating in order to make her graduate from school. She appears in both seasons.
- Zbigniew Buczkowski as Janek - a homeless man and a friend of the cops. He left his home because of his wife and sometimes sleeps in a station cell. He appears only in the first season.
- Dorota Chotecka as Jola - a ginger-haired prostitute and Czarek's girlfriend. She initially didn't get along with Kasia, but they later became friends. Jola breaks up with Czarek in episode 26, and in the second season she has a relationship with Rysio. She appears in both seasons.
- Dariusz Gnatowski as Alfons "Alf" Biernacki - Jola's pimp, he usually takes 50% of her incomes.
- Barbara Burska and Andrzej Niemirski as Inspectors Pierzchała and Kot - a pair of Capital Police Headquarters officers that want to fire Czarek and the others. They have feelings for each other, but they try to hide them.
