= Hamermesh =

Hamermesh is a surname. Notable people with the surname include:

- Daniel S. Hamermesh (born 1943), American economist
- Mira Hamermesh (1923–2012), Polish filmmaker
- Morton Hamermesh (1915–2003), American physicist
