= Joanna Brodzik =

Polish actress

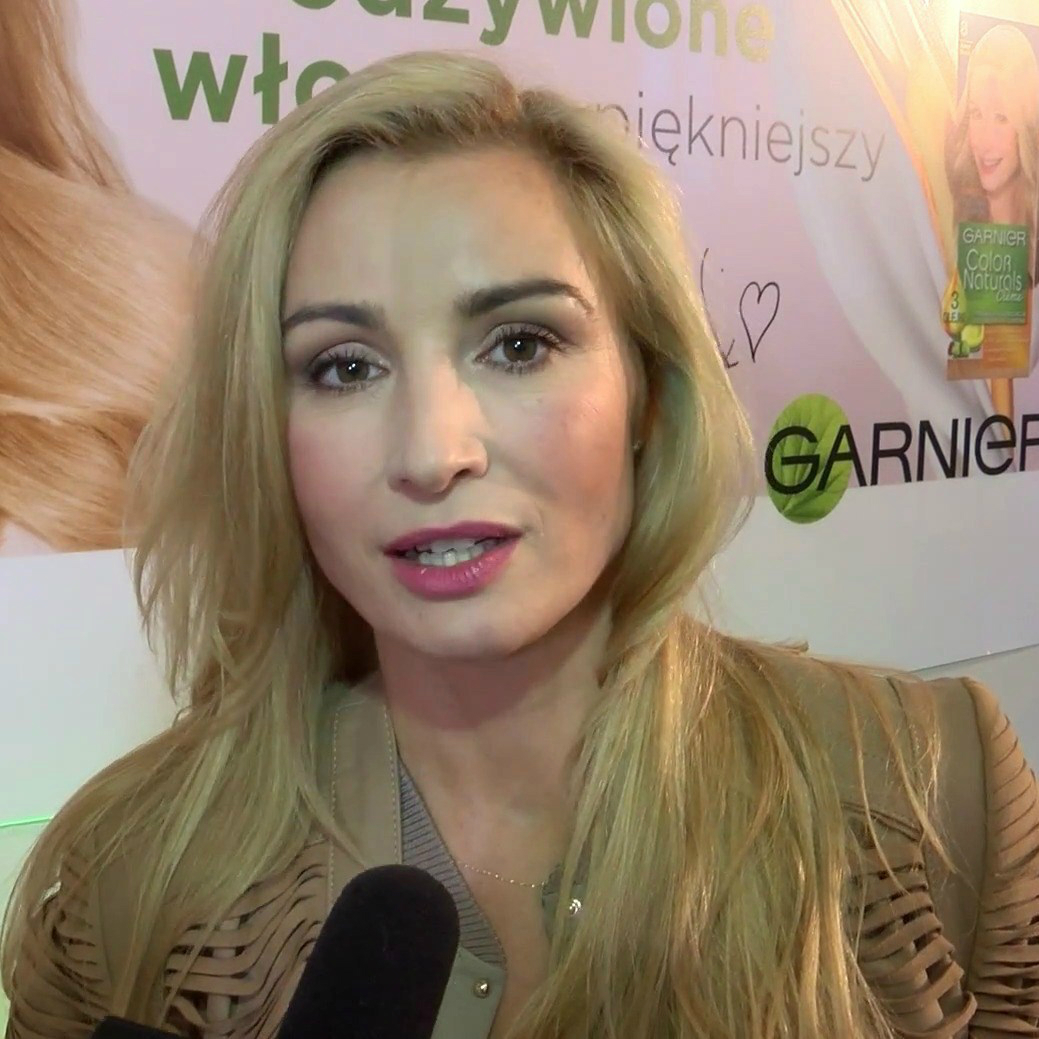
- Joanna Brodzik, 2016
- Born: Joanna Honorata Brodzik; Krosno Odrzańskie, Poland
- Occupation: Actress
- Years active: 1996–present
- Spouse: Bartłomiej Świderski (–2003)
- Partner: Paweł Wilczak (2004–present)

Joanna Honorata Brodzik (born in Krosno Odrzańskie, Poland) is a Polish actress. She is most famous for her roles in two TV shows: Magda M. and Kasia i Tomek.

Joanna Brodzik has won the Prize for Best Actress (ex aequo to Beata Kawka) at the Madrid Móstoles International Film Festival for the Polish production Jasne błękitne okna (The Skylights), by Bogusław Linda. Joanna Nalepka is her relative.

== Filmography ==
- 1996: Dzieci i ryby
- 1996: Dzień wielkiej ryby
- 1997: Klan
- 1998: Gabinet terapii ogólnej
- 1998: Złoto dezerterów
- 1999: Ogniem i mieczem
- 1999: Dobra robota
- 1999–2001: Graczykowie
- 2000: Gunblast vodka
- 2001: Pokrewieństwo
- 2002: Break Point
- 2002: Der Pianist
- 2002–2003: Kasia i Tomek
- 2004: Nigdy w życiu!
- 2004: Siedem grzechów popcooltury
- 2005–2007: Magda M.
- 2005: 1409. Afera na zamku Bartenstein
- 2007: Jasne błękitne okna
- 2009: Po prostu Majka
- 2009: Dom nad rozlewiskiem
