= Kombii =

Polish pop rock band

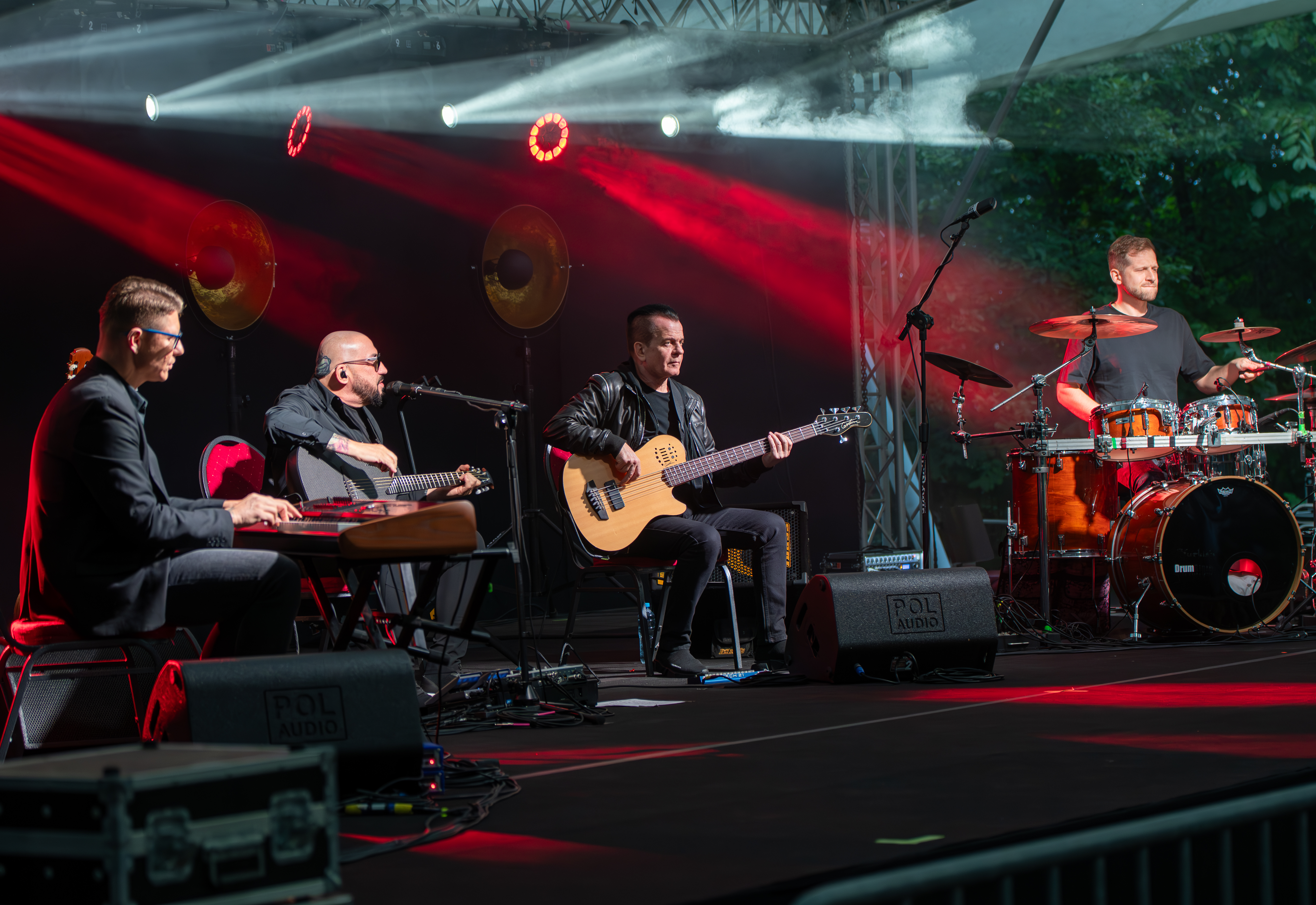
- Kombii in 2023. From left: Wojciech Horny, Grzegorz Skawiński, Waldemar Tkaczyk, and Adam Tkaczyk.

Background information
- Origin: Poland
- Genres: pop rock
- Years active: 2003-present
- Labels: Universal Music Poland
- Members: Grzegorz Skawiński; Waldemar Tkaczyk; Adam Tkaczyk; Wojciech Horny
- Past members: Jan Pluta (deceased); Bartosz Wielgosz
- Website: www.kombii.com.pl

Kombii is a Polish pop rock band created in 2003 by three former members of the group Kombi.

In 2003 Skawiński, Tkaczyk and Pluta created Kombii, without Sławomir Łosowski (who was the leader and creator of the original group Kombi) but with the addition of keyboardist Bartosz Wielgosz. The new band has achieved national commercial success, with a number of their releases (among them C.D., including the single "Pokolenie") charting in Poland.

== Discography ==
=== Studio albums ===
Title	Album details	Peak chart positions	Sales	Certifications
Title	Album details	POL	Sales	Certifications
C.D.	Released: October 25, 2004; Label: Universal Music Poland; Formats: CD, digital download	2	POL: 140,000+	POL: 2× Platinum
Ślad	Released: June 18, 2007; Label: Universal Music Poland; Formats: CD, digital download	1	POL: 30,000+	POL: Platinum
O Miłości	Released: May 24, 2010; Label: Universal Music Poland; Formats: CD, digital download	5	POL: 15,000+	POL: Gold
Wszystko jest jak pierwszy raz	Released: May 6, 2014; Label: Universal Music Poland; Formats: CD, digital download	8		
"—" denotes a recording that did not chart or was not released in that territory.

=== Remix albums ===
Title	Album details	Peak chart positions
Title	Album details	POL
D.A.N.C.E.	Released: August 18, 2008; Label: Universal Music Poland; Formats: CD, digital download	6
"—" denotes a recording that did not chart or was not released in that territory.

=== Live albums ===
Title	Album details
Electro Acoustic Live	Released: November 20, 2012; Label: Universal Music Poland; Formats: CD, digital download
