= Urszula Grabowska =

Polish actress (born 1976)

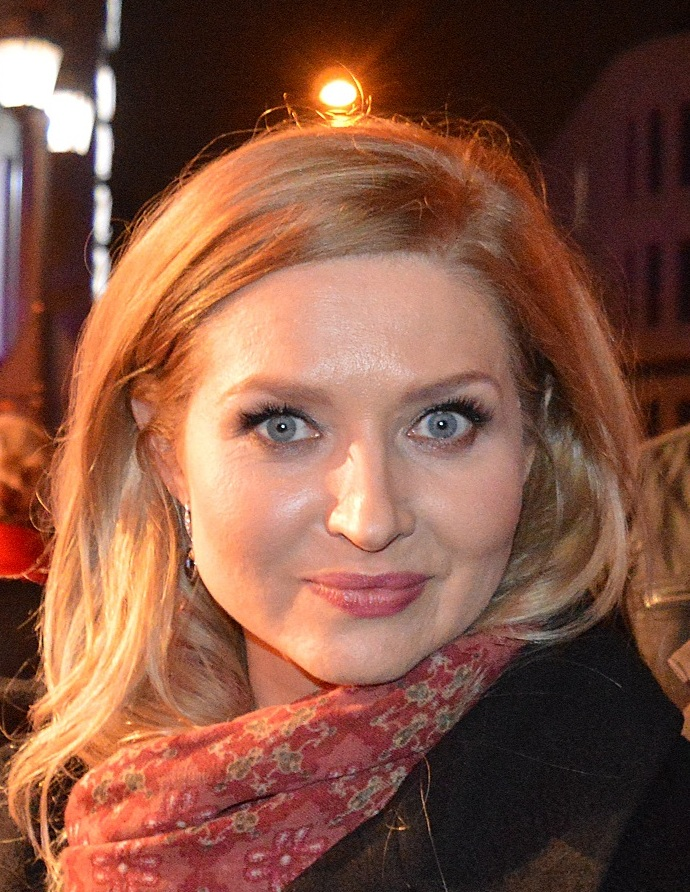
- Grabowska in 2018
- Born: 27 June 1976 (age 49); Myślenice, Poland
- Occupation: Actress
- Years active: 1997–present

Urszula Grabowska-Ochalik (born 27 June 1976) is a Polish film and television actress. A member of Polish Film Academy, Grabowska won the Polish Academy Award for Best Actress for her leading role in the 2010 drama film, Joanna.

== Life and career ==
Grabowska was born in Myślenice in a working-class family. Her father worked on Tadeusz Sendzimir Steelworks. In 2000, she graduated from the AST National Academy of Theatre Arts in Kraków and began performing on stage productions. She made her screen debut appearing in the 2001 drama film, The Spring to Come. The following years she worked mostly on Polish television series such as Magda M., Na dobre i na zle and Tylko miłość.

In 2010, Grabowska starred in the drama film, Joanna, a role earned her the Polish Academy Award for Best Actress. She later appeared in films Siberian Exile (2013), The Closed Circuit (2013), Carte Blanche (2015) and Memories of Summer (2016).
