= Uday Shankar (disambiguation) =

Uday Shankar (1900–1977) was an Indian dancer and choreographer

Uday Shankar may also refer to:

- Uday Shankar (businessman), born 1962, current head of Star India and The Walt Disney Company India
- Uday Shankar Pani, Indian filmmaker
- Chi. Udayashankar, Indian screenwriter and lyricist
