= Dariusz Gnatowski =

Polish actor (1961–2020)

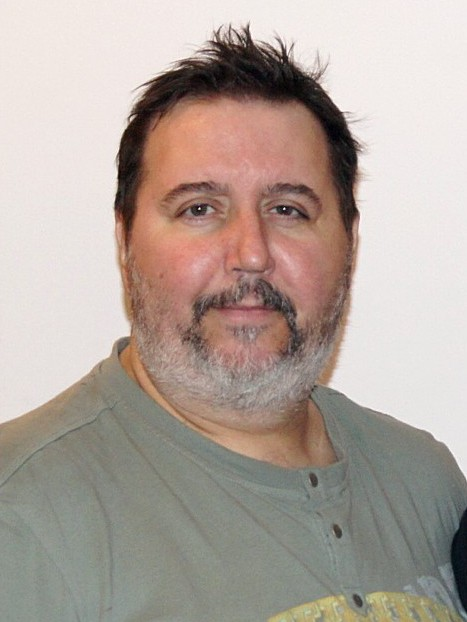
- Dariusz Gnatowski in 2011
- Born: 24 May 1961; Ruda Śląska, Poland
- Died: 20 October 2020 (aged 59); Kraków, Poland
- Occupation: Actor
- Years active: 1983–2020
- Spouse: Anna Wach

Dariusz Gnatowski (24 May 1961 – 20 October 2020) was a Polish actor. He was known for his roles in Demons of War (1998), With Fire and Sword (1999) and most importantly for his role as Arnold Boczek in the sitcom Świat według Kiepskich.

== Biography ==
Gnatowski was born in Ruda Śląska, Poland, on 24 May 1961, and grew up in Zabrze, where he attended elementary school and high school. In 1985, he graduated from the AST National Academy of Theatre Arts in Kraków.

Soon after his graduation, Gnatowski appeared as Pyzo in a play which was an adaptation of the novel Ferdydurke by Witold Gombrowicz, directed by Maciej Wojtyszko for Teatr Telewizji. On 20 December 1986, he made his debut as Mieczysław Walpurg in the drama "Madman and the Nun" by Stanisław Ignacy Witkiewicz, directed by Krzysztof Jasiński in Theater Scena STU in Kraków. Gnatowski was associated with this theater throughout his acting career. In the years 1987–1988 and 1997–2001 he also collaborated with Ludowy Theatre in Kraków.

In 1988, he first appeared on the small screen, appearing in the first episode of the series Crimen as a member of the staff sect. In 1994, he made his debut on the big screen, when he played Barnabas in the film Miasto prywatne ("Private City"). In the 1990s, he hosted programs for children in TVP1, such as Włóczykija Guide on tourism and history, or Words, words and half-words, a game show about the Polish language.

He appeared in the movies Ferdydurke (1991), Myasto priwatne (1994), Dzieje mistrza Twardowskiego (1995), Sara (1997), Młode wilki 1/2 (1997), Demons of War (1998), With Fire and Sword (1999), Anioł w Krakowie (2002) and Zakochany Anioł (2005).

In 2002, Gnatowski, who had been struggling with obesity since an early age, wrote the book "Diet without sacrifices", promoting a healthy lifestyle, together with Michał Mularczyk.

In 2009, he lent his voice to the main character of the radio soap opera Gotowy na wszystko ("Ready for Everything"), broadcast on summer vacation on RMF FM. In the same year, he was diagnosed with retinopathy and diabetic foot resulting from long-term untreated type 2 diabetes.

In 2012, he was nominated for the Jan Machulski Polish Independent Cinema Award for his role in the etude Kiedy ranne wstają zorze ("When the morning arise auroras").

In 2013, he founded "Get Up Together. Active Rehabilitation" and was active in the prevention and fight against diabetes. In the years 2015–2020 he was the director and re-enactor of the main role in the educational play "Słodki drań", presenting the issues of living with diabetes.

Gnatowski appeared in over twenty TV series between 1988 and 2020, including Tatort (1996), 13 posterunek (1996), Świat według Kiepskich (from 1999 to 2019), Na dobre i na złe (2003 and 2014), Pierwsza miłość (2006), and Pasjonaci (2019–2020).

== Death ==
On 20 October 2020, during the COVID-19 pandemic, Gnatowski was admitted to the Józef Dietl Hospital of Kraków, Poland, due to pneumonia, and despite the efforts of the doctors, developed acute respiratory failure and cardiac arrest, resulting in his death on the same day. He was tested for COVID-19, and the result came back positive. Gnatowski was 59.

== Private life ==
From 1990 he was married to Anna Wach, with whom he had a daughter, Julia. He lived in Gorzków near Wieliczka.

== Awards ==
- Cross of Merit – 2005
- Medal for Merit to Culture – Gloria Artis – 2016
- "Honoris Gratia" Badge – 2016
