= The Last Mission (2000 film) =

- Directed by: Wojciech Wójcik
- Written by: Witold Horwath
- Starring: Peter J. Lucas; Janusz Gajos; Piotr Fronczewski; Ewa Gorzelak
- Release date: March 24, 2000 (Poland)
- Running time: 102 minutes
- Country: Poland

The Last Mission (Polish: Ostatnia misja) is a Polish film directed by Wojciech Wójcik. It was filmed in 1999, from 6 January to 1 March.

The band O.N.A. created the music for the film.

== Cast ==
- Peter J. Lucas – Andrzej Kostynowicz
- Janusz Gajos - police officer Piotr Sobczak
- Ewa Gorzelak - Monika Górska
- Piotr Fronczewski - Józef Muran
- Mirosław Baka - Bruno Wiśniewski, Muran's man
- Artur Żmijewski - Krzysztof Myszkowski
- Piotr Rzymyszkiewicz - agent
- Tomasz Białkowski - Colonel Tremiere
- Paweł Wilczak - aspirant Kowal, Sobczak's man
- Joachim Lamża - David, an FBI agent resident in Poland
- Wojciech Kalarus - police officer I
- Jan Kozaczuk - police officer II
- Bartłomiej Świderski - police officer III
- Mirosław Zbrojewicz - Sztych
- Sławomir Orzechowski - Rekord
- Sebastian Nietupski - Makumba, Bruno's man
- Zbigniew Dziduch - Rekord's guard
- Krzysztof Szczerbiński - drug dealer
- Antoni Wilkoński - Mateusz, Sobczak's grandson
- Zuzanna Wojtal - Ewa, Sobczak's grandson
- Małgorzata Foremniak - Sobczak's daughter
- Maria Pakulnis - Dr Sawicka
- Sybilla Rostek - Kałużyńska's secretary
- Borys Jaźnicki - Muran's secretary
- Jacek Braciak - courier company worker
- Jerzy Kamas - Stefan Dębowski
- Lech Łotocki - police specialist I
- Igor Sawin - police specialist
- Krzysztof Kalczyński - president of Biznes Klub
- Zbigniew Geiger - Farina
- Sławomir Tomczak - man on the street
- Danuta Stenka - Kałużyńska
- Andrzej Piszczatowski - Prefekt
- Marek Barbasiewicz - Paweł Górski, Monika's stepfather
- Andrzej Żółkiewski - police officer in hotel reception I
- Wojciech Majchrzak - police officer in hotel reception II
- Grzegorz Miśtal - receptionist in hotel
- Michał Grudziński - Kostynowicz's doctor
- Maciej Kozłowski - Cortez
- Janusz Nowicki - General Winkler
