= Tylko miłość =

Polish drama television series

- Genre: Drama
- Directed by: Przemysław Angerman; Jan Macierewicz; Monika Lewicka
- Starring: Bartłomiej Świderski; Małgorzata Kożuchowska; Urszula Grabowska; Marysia Łyszkowska; Małgorzata Socha; Andrzej Andrzejewski; Edyta Herbuś; Ewa Ziętek; Marian Dziędziel
- Composer: Andrzej Smolik
- Country of origin: Poland
- Original language: Polish
- No. of seasons: 4
- No. of episodes: 69

Production
- Executive producer: Violetta Furmaniuk-Zaorska
- Running time: 44 minutes

Original release
- Network: Polsat
- Release: September 13, 2007 – September 20, 2009

Tylko miłość (Polish pronunciation: [tɨlkɔ miwɔɕtɕ], Only Love) is a Polish drama television series, broadcast on Polsat from September 13, 2007 to September 20, 2009.

== Plot ==
The series follows the fortunes of Rafał Rozner, 30-year-old architect who, after the death of his wife bringing up a daughter Lusia. He lives in the huge house on the outskirts of Warsaw, with his daughter, nanny, housekeeper and unfulfilled painter – brother Wiktor. His life is changing one evening when spending time in the bar meets rising pop star, Sylwia. After spending the night together Rafał and Sylwia become lovers, however, and is not satisfied until he Rozner on its way becoming a Lusia's teacher, Maja Kryńska.

== Cast ==
Actor	Role
Bartłomiej Świderski	Rafał Rozner
Małgorzata Kożuchowska	Maja Kryńska
Urszula Grabowska	Sylwia Sztern
Marysia Łyszkowska	Lusia Rozner
Andrzej Andrzejewski	Wiktor Rozner
Edyta Herbuś	Zuzanna Karaś
Małgorzata Socha	Dorota Sztern
Ewa Ziętek	Irena Wilkowska
Halina Golanko	Maria Rozner
Maria Pakulnis	Krystyna Bogusz
Jerzy Bończak	Zdzisław Bogusz
Marian Dziędziel	Leon Kryński
Karolina Muszalak	Alicja Rębacz
Bartosz Żukowski	Korba
Robert Moskwa	Paweł Nadolski
Piotr Grabowski (born 1968)	Tomasz Rataj
Tadeusz Huk	Aleks Tudor
Andrzej Młynarczyk	Jaro
Sambor Czarnota	Marek
Igor Stachowiak	Krzyś
Rafał Cieszyński	Roland Żurek
Joanna Liszowska	Paulina Gryn
Krzysztof Piechocki	Kuba Lemański
Aleksandra Kisio	Kama
Andrzej Grabowski	Maks Wolar
Andrzej Nejman	Adam Sawicki
Łukasz Dziemidok	Jurek
Anna Dereszowska	Karolina
Żora Koroliow	Sasza Ivanov
Magdalena Różczka	Ewa
