= Grzegorz Miśtal =

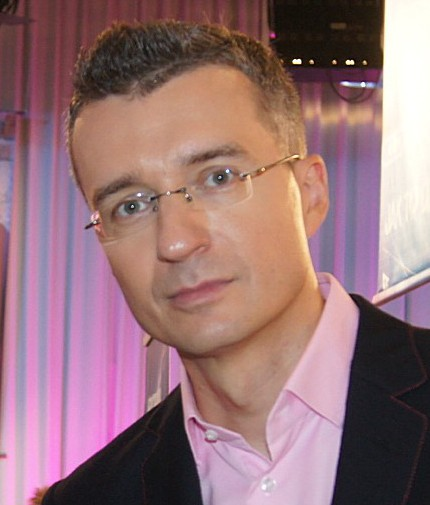
Grzegorz Miśtal, 2012

Grzegorz Miśtal (born 19 January 1973, in Kraków) - Polish movie actor and TV actor, and theater actor. Since 1999 he is reporter of Telewizja Polska. Since September 2009 he is host of Program Kawa Czy Herbata?. He guides too a program: Ktokolwiek widział, ktokolwiek wie.

== Filmography ==
- Spis cudzołożnic (1995), as man in a bar
- Boża podszewka (1997), as AK soldier
- Klan (1997-2007), as Adam Horecki
- Sara (1997), as basketballer
- Ostatnia misja (1999), as desk clerk
- Pierwszy milion (1999), as man in a disco
- Lokatorzy (2001), as Adam
- Na dobre i na złe (2004), as himself
- Rodzinka (2004), as patient
