= Sławomir Łosowski =

Polish musician

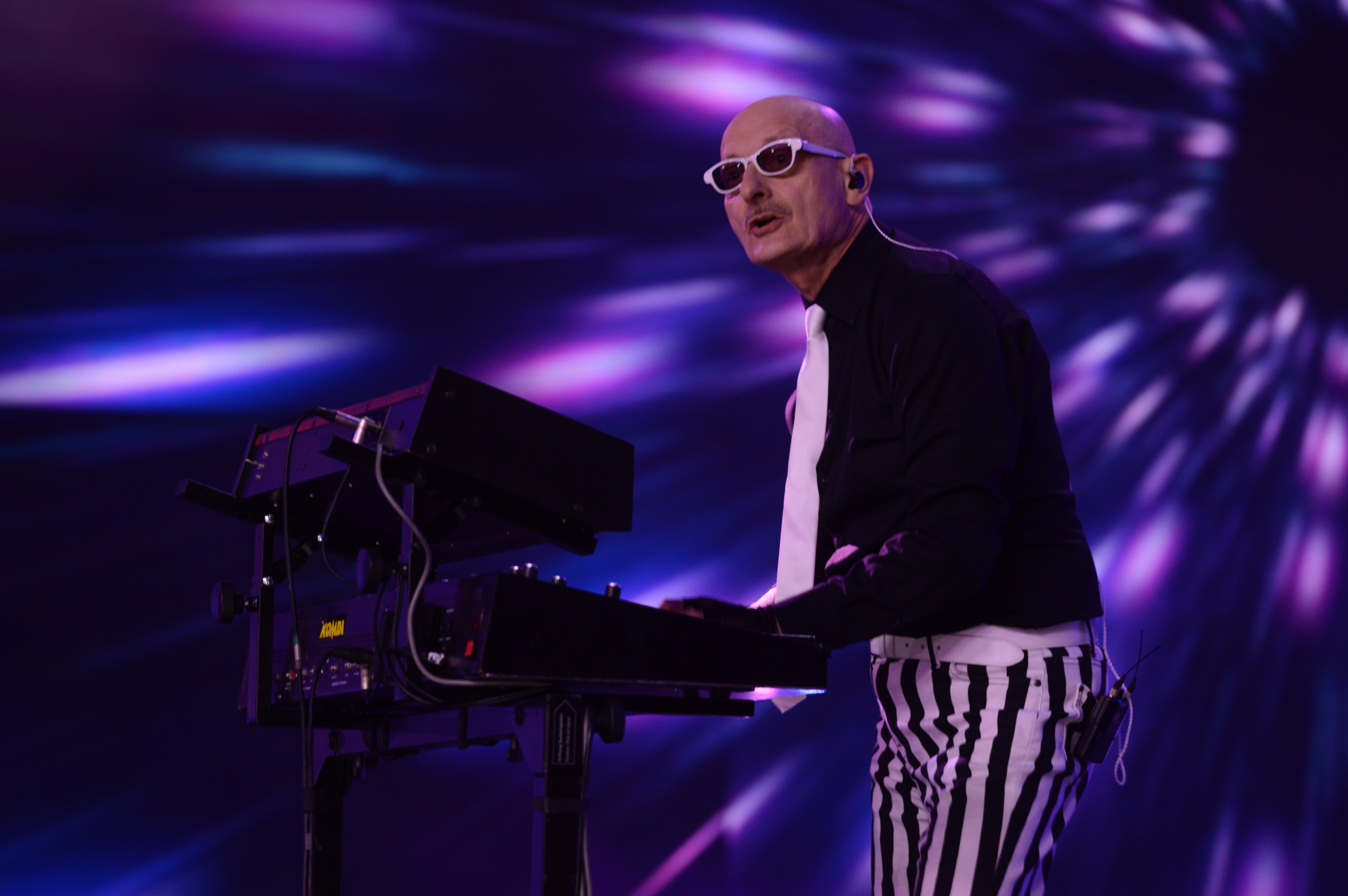
Sławomir Łosowski, 2022

Sławomir Łosowski (born 31 August 1951 in Gdańsk) is a synthesizer player from Poland. He is known as the leader and founder of the synthpop band Kombi. His son Tomasz also plays with the band.
