= Myślenice =

Town in Lesser Poland Voivodeship, Poland

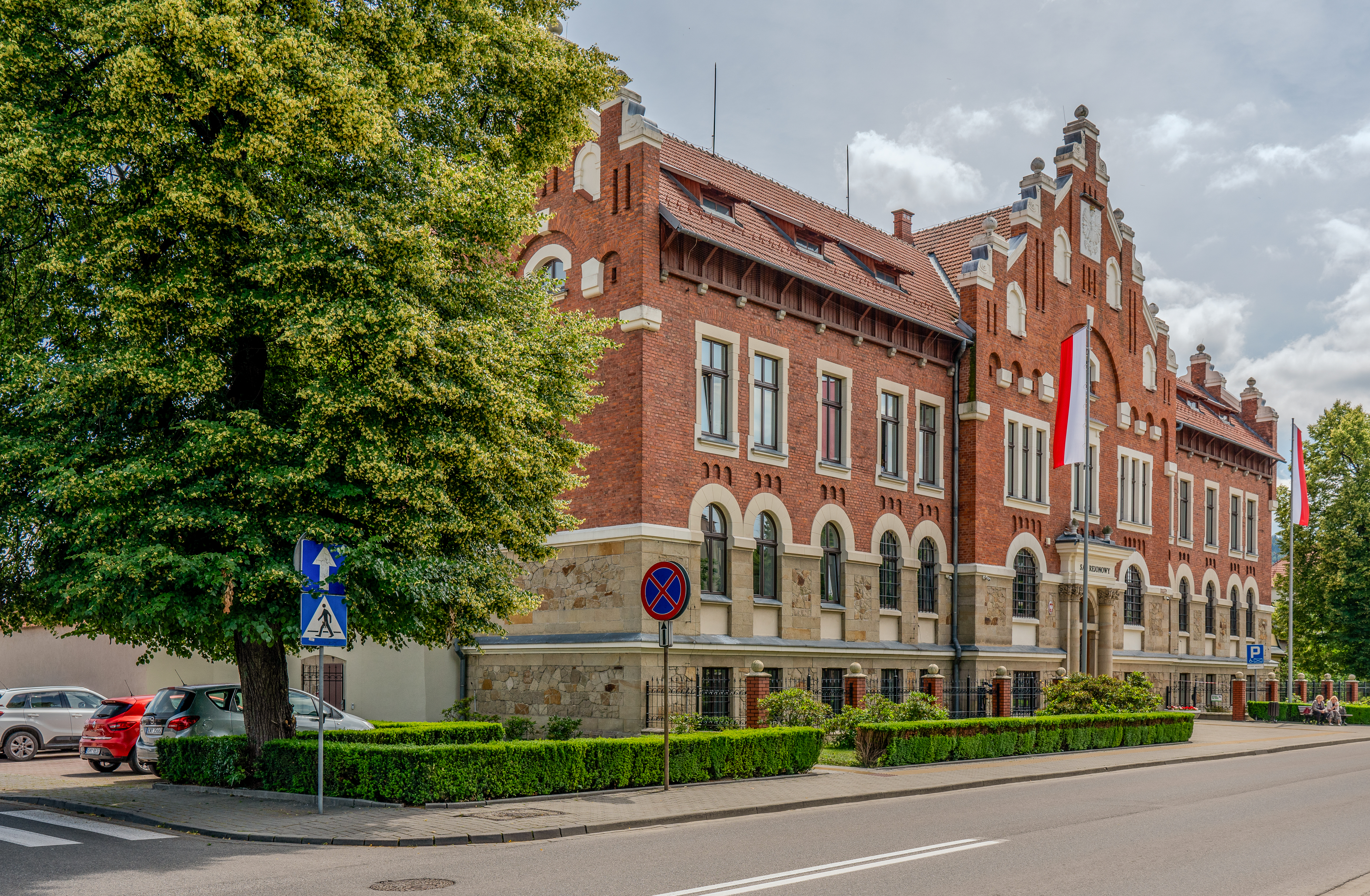
- Courthouse

- Flag Coat of arms

- Location within Poland
- Coordinates: 49°50′05″N 19°56′20″E
- Country: Poland
- Voivodeship: Lesser Poland Voivodeship
- County: Myślenice
- Gmina: Myślenice
- First mentioned: 13th century
- Town rights: 1342

Government
  - Mayor: Jarosław Szlachetka (PiS)

Area
  - Total: 30.1 km^{2} (11.6 sq mi)

Population (31.12.2024)
  - Total: 17,107
  - Density: 568/km^{2} (1,470/sq mi)
- Time zone: UTC+1 (CET)
  - Summer (DST): UTC+2 (CEST)
- Postal code: 32-400
- Car plates: KMY
- Website: http://www.myslenice.pl

Myślenice [mɨɕlɛˈɲit͡sɛ] is a town in southern Poland situated in the Lesser Poland Voivodeship, 30 km south of Kraków. The town is divided into six districts. The most popular of them, Zarabie, is a famous tourist destination. It is located behind the Raba river (Zarabie meaning "Beyond the (River) Raba"), next to Chełm district on the slope of the hill of the same name, where is a view tower and a landscape park and ski lifts.

Myślenice is a city located in the tectonic window area, between the Dalin, Chełm and Uklejna hills. The city is also located on the border of two Beskids (in the south) and the foothills (in the north). From the western bank of the Raba River these are Maków Beskids and Wieliczka Foothills while on the eastern bank of the river - Island Beskids and Wiśnicz Foothills.

Myślenice has a direct and very convenient bus connection with Kraków however there is no train station in the city.

== History ==
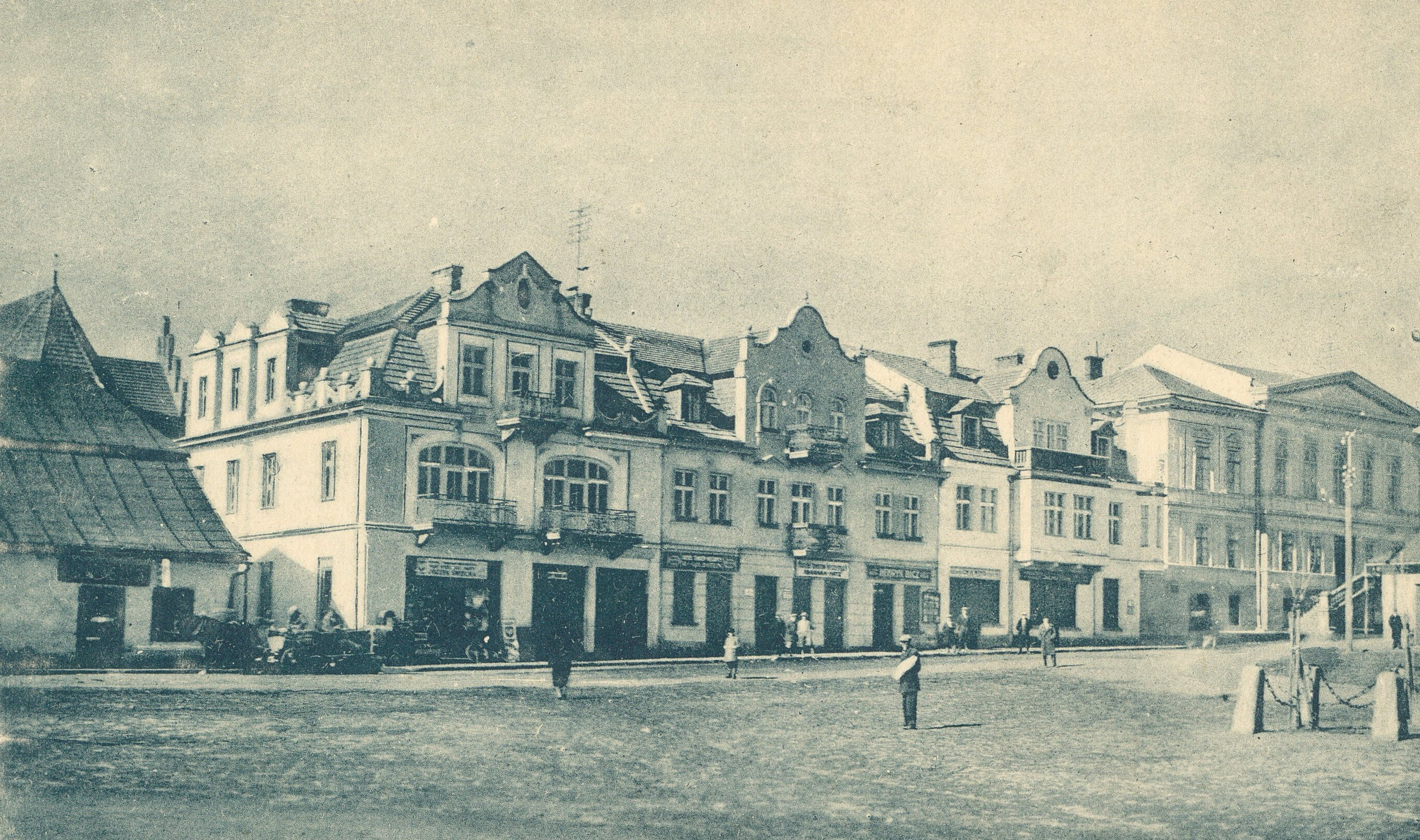
Rynek (Market Square) in 1933

First mentions of Myślenice come from the years 1253–1258. At that time, it was a defensive settlement, with a castle and fortifications, designed to protect Kraków from the south. In 1342, Myślenice received its Magdeburg rights town charter, and it started to develop into a local commercial center. Among visitors who came here, were Mikołaj Rej, who wrote part of his Life of an Honest Man during his stay there; King Władysław II Jagiełło and Queen Jadwiga; Holy Roman Emperor Sigismund; and other personalities. In 1557, Myślenice came under the jurisdiction of Kraków castellans, who were much more concerned with their city. The town began to decline, and it was destroyed in the Deluge.

In the First Partition of Poland, in 1772, Myślenice was annexed by Austria, and until 1918, it belonged to the province of Galicia. After World War I, the town became part of the Second Polish Republic. Following the German-Soviet invasion of Poland, which started World War II in September 1939, the town was occupied by Germany. On 22 January 1945, Myślenice was liberated by the troops of 38th Army of the 4th Ukrainian Front. Between 1975-1998 the city was part of the Kraków Voivodeship.

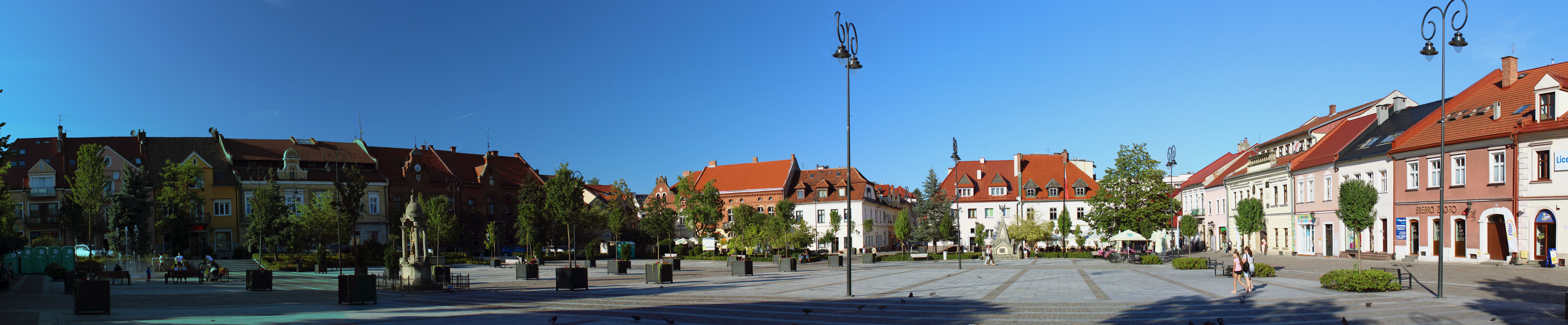
Rynek (Market Square)

== Twin towns – sister cities ==
Myślenice is twinned with:

- Bełchatów, Poland
- Csopak, Hungary
- Dahlonega, United States
- Lüdenscheid, Germany
- Tinqueux, France

== Sports ==
- Dalin Myślenice - football team playing in Jako IV liga Lesser Poland cluster and also a women's volleyball team playing in Polish Seria A Women's Volleyball League
- Orzeł Myślenice - football team playing at the seventh hierarchy level Liga Okręgowa (group: Kraków III)
- LKS Górki Myślenice - football team playing at the eighth tier of the Polish football hierarchy in Myślenice group
- TKKF Uklejna Myślenice - sports association that brings together activities such as badminton, running, gymnastics, cycling, volleyball and tennis.

== Notable people ==
- Daniel Obajtek, president of the management board of Orlen company was born in Myślenice
- CFL slotback Dave Stala was born here.
- Waldemar Fornalik who was born in Myślenice and moved to Chorzów where he played for the entire career before becoming a manager
- Myślenice is a family town for famous Polish actress Urszula Grabowska who was raised there
- Polish mountain biker Anna Szafraniec comes from Myślenice as well
