= Nie dla oka... =

Studio album by Agnieszka Włodarczyk
- Released: 30 November 2007
- Recorded: 2007
- Genre: Pop
- Length: 38:33
- Label: My Music
- Producer: Robert Janson

Agnieszka Włodarczyk chronology
Nie dla oka... (2007)	Najpiękniejsze polskie kolędy (2011)

Professional ratings
Review scores
Source	Rating
Machina	1/5 stars
Muzyczna.pl	3/10 stars
Onet.pl	3/5 stars

Nie dla oka... (English: Not for Eyes...) is a debut studio album by Polish actress and singer Agnieszka Włodarczyk. It was released in November 2007, following Włodarczyk's win in Jak oni śpiewają, the Polish edition of Soapstar Superstar.

== Background ==
Recording an album was one of the prizes in Jak oni śpiewają, the Polish edition of Soapstar Superstar. After winning the show, Agnieszka Włodarczyk teamed up with Robert Janson, the leader of a Polish pop-rock group Varius Manx, who produced the album. It was recorded in the studio S4 and released by My Music label. Many famous Polish musicians have worked with Agnieszka on this project, including Krzysztof Antkowiak. Some of the lyrics were written by Włodarczyk herself. There are also two covers: Krystyna Prońko's "Małe tęsknoty" and Grażyna Łobaszewska's "Brzydcy".

Three singles were planned to be released to promote the album. The lead single, "Zawsze byłam", was a big radio hit in Poland, but the follow-up, "Bez makijażu", passed unnoticed. Due to the lack of success of the second single and less than satisfying sales of the album, the release of the third single "Pokochać ciszę" was cancelled. The album received rather negative response from the critics, however, it eventually was certified Gold in Poland.

== Track listing ==
1. "Bez makijażu" – 3:43
2. "Zawsze byłam" – 3:45
3. "Pokochać ciszę" – 4:01
4. "Niepotrzebny" – 3:41
5. "Wróć" – 4:13
6. "Zamknij oczy" – 3:52
7. "Spokój" – 3:25
8. "Odnajdę siebie" – 3:31
9. "Brzydcy" – 3:18
10. "Powiedz jej" – 3:33
11. "Małe tęsknoty" – 2:43

== Chart performance ==
Chart (2007)	Peak position
Polish Albums Chart (OLiS)	21
