= Uday Shankar Pani =

Indian film maker

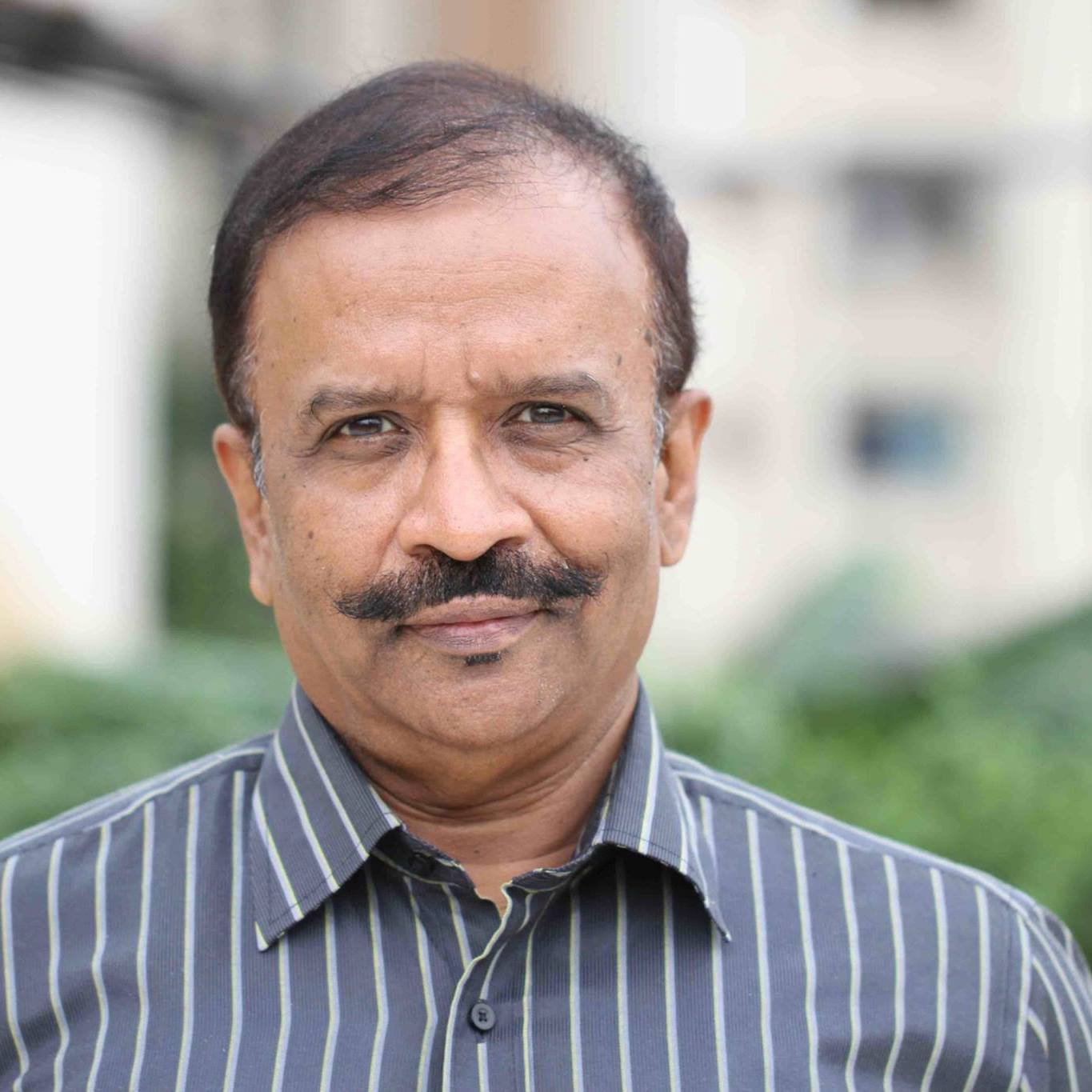
- Uday Shankar Pani in 2014
- Born: Odisha
- Education: FTII Pune
- Notable work: Assistant Director in Richard Attenborough’s Gandhi

Uday Shankar Pani is an Indian film maker. He graduated in 1974 from the Film and Television Institute of India. He was an assistant director in Richard Attenborough's Gandhi. A 1974 documentary on the National Film Archive of India made by Pani was screened on that organization's 52nd anniversary. In 2016, he was selected as one of thirteen jurors for that year's International Film Festival of India. He is on the faculty) at Flyking Film Academy.

== Earlier years ==
Uday Shankar Pani was born in Odisha, brought up in Delhi, studied in a south Indian school and is now settled in Mumbai. While growing up he was into painting cartoons, theatre, sculpturing, sports but never had any interest in cinema. He wanted to join the army but NDA rejected him and his attempts to clear dozens of competitive exams were also unsuccessful. He finally managed to get selected in Film & TV Institute of India in Pune. Joining FTII at a very young age of 18, felt like almost growing up in cinema & realised that cinema is the king of all professions. After passing out as a trained film director at the young age of 21, he assisted many film makers for a decade. He started directing his own short films from 1980s onwards.

== Career ==
Among the prominent short films, Pani had the launched was Hindustan Lever's' Fair & Lovely. Also he directed short films for New India Assurance, GIC, Air India, NFL, MCF, SCI, MTC, Deccan Florabase, Ford Foundation, and Nitco Tiles. Pani most famous Lijjat Udyog's papad ad with rabbit is a landmark in the world of advertisement films.

He was an assistant director to Krishna Shah in his foreign production Shalimar. His major career highlight happened when hired as the 1st assistant director to Sir Richard Attenborough's 'Gandhi' and BBC's ' Jim Corbett'. Apart from directing many music videos, events, tele- shopping films, TV serials & been busy teaching in major film schools. Currently Full-time Faculty at Flyking Film Academy.

In recent past, he has been an integral part various film festivals as a jury member.

== Filmography ==
Foreign Productions
First Assistant Director to Krishna Shah's SHALIMAR
Richard Attenborough's GANDHI
PM and AD to Alex Kirby in BBC (Bristol)'s 'JIM KORBETT'
Nick Gifford's 'FELLA BY THE NAME OF...'
Mira Hamermesh's 'CASTE BY BIRTH'
Pamela Salem's 'FISH IN THE SKY'
Co-produced Lisa Film's German film 'INDIA-THE HOTEL OF DREAMS'
Four Documentaries 'TEMPLES', 'TULSIDAS', 'VALMIKI', 'BHAJANS' FOR OHM CHANNEL (Netherlands)
Music Video for German Band 'SCOOTER'

Feature Films
Director 'Samjhana' (Nepali)
Sansar (Bangla)
Micha maya Sansar (Oriya)
Hiba Production's 'Khatarnak Irade', 'Jazira' & 'Janjhal'
Gulshan Kumar's 'Suryaputra Shanidev, 'Jai Jaganath' & 'Chaar Dhaam'
Line Producer for Anushka Images' 'Dhoom Dhadaka' & Lisa Film's 'India - The Hotel of Dreams' (German)

T.V. Serials
Project Co-ordinator for Basu Chatterjee's 'Rajani', 'Darpan'
Directed episodes of 'Indradhanush'
Dekh Bhai Dekh
Hitaopedesha (Sanskrit)
Yeh Bhi Hai Udyog
'Stritama' & 'Bhakti Sagar'
Balaji Telefilms' 'Mano Ya Na Mano'
Dhun Dadaka
Ketan Mehta's 'Captain Vyom'
ETVs 'Lakshyavar Lakshya, Gatti Jamali' & 'Pakht Tujas'
UTV's 'Cats'
DD's 'Kachhi Rahen' & 'Pachtava'
Sahara's 'Raat Hone Tak', Siddarth Kak's 'Surabhi' & 'Mano Ya Na Mano'
