= Agnieszka Perepeczko =

Polish actress

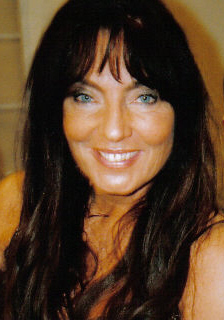
- Born: 6 May 1942 (age 84); Warsaw, Poland
- Education: Aleksander Zelwerowicz State Theatre Academy
- Occupations: Film and stage actor
- Years active: 1966-2008
- Spouse: Marek Perepeczko

Agnieszka Perepeczko (born 6 May 1942) also billed as A. Fitkau, is a Polish-born former actress, best known for her stage and screen performances after her emigration to Australia.

== Biography ==
Perepeczko was born in Warsaw, Poland, in 1966 she graduated at Aleksander Zelwerowicz State Theatre Academy in Warsaw. She is best remembered for her brief appearance in the television series Prisoner during 1984, in which she played East German concentration camp survivor Hannah Geldschmidt.

She was married to fellow Polish stage and screen actor Marek Perepeczko from 1967 until his death in 2005.

In 2024, Perepeczko gave a rare interview with Prisoner podcast series Talking Prisoner.

== Filmography ==
Title	Year	Role
Tabiliczka marzenia	1968	kochanka Stefana
Laika	1968	Young Lady (uncredited)
Przygody pana Michała (TV series)	1969	Dziewczyna zabzwiajaca się ze strażnikiem (As A. Fitkau)
Landscape After Michael	1970	kolezanka Niny (notę:billed Herę as Agnieszko Fitkau)
Nie lubię poniedziałku	1971	Stewardess (uncredited)
Za scion (TV movie)	1971	Neighbour (uncredited)
Motodrama	1971	Clerk
Wyspy szczesilwe (TV movie)	1972	Nurse
A Jungle Book of Revelations	1974	Tenent (uncredited)
Motylem jestem, ozyli romans czterdziestolatka	1976	Miss Burk
Rod Gasiencow	1981	Modrzejewską Helenę
Prisoner: Cell Block H) (TV series)	1984	Hannah Geldschimidt
Special Squad	1984	Phoebe
Fame and Misfortune	1986	Madame Zibroski
The Lancaster Miller Affair (TV mini-series)	1986	Mrs, Russell
The Flying Doctors (TV series)	1987	Eva Mirevski
Raw Silk (TV movie)	1988	Lulu
The Humpty Dumpty Man	Yelena Gaikin	
Dead to the World	1991	Alexandra
Chances (TV series)	1991	Paola
A Country Practice (TV series)	1994	Sophia Sabatini
Lucky Break	1994	Woman at Wedding
Simone de Beauvoir's Babies (TV miniseries)	1997	Swimming Instructor
The Sound of One Hand Clapping	1998	Mrs. Michouk's Friends
Prostytutki	1998	Lida (note: billed her as Agnieszka Fitkau-Perepeczko)
M jak milosc (TV series)	2003-2007	Simone Muller
29 i Poi (TV series)	2008	Maggie
