= Magda M. =

- Genre: Soap opera
- Created by: Michał Kwieciński, Dorota Chamczyk
- Written by: Radosław Figura (Head writer)
- Starring: Joanna Brodzik; Paweł Małaszyński; Ewa Kasprzyk; Bartłomiej Świderski; Daria Widawska; Krzysztof Stelmaszyk; Katarzyna Herman; Bartek Kasprzykowski; Katarzyna Bujakiewicz; Szymon Bobrowski; Jacek Braciak; Patrycja Durska
- No. of episodes: 55

Production
- Executive producer: Dariusz Gąsiorowski
- Running time: 42–47 minutes

Original release
- Network: TVN
- Release: September 6, 2005 – June 5, 2007

Magda M. (Polish pronunciation: [ˈmaɡda ˈɛm]) was a Polish soap opera which aired on TVN from 2005 to 2007.

== Plot ==
Magdalena Miłowicz is a young lawyer who seems to be a little lost in her love life, until she meets Peter, a man who also turns out to be a lawyer. After they met, they fall madly in love.

Nonetheless, Peter has chosen to fight for Magda's affection. Once he wins Magda's love, he gets very sick with an illness, requiring him to go to the United States for treatment. However, he chose not tell Magda, unwillingly hurting her in the process.

When he gets well and comes back, he tries to win her back. But for leaving her without a word, she wants him out of her life, saying that she has other men to choose from. But the question is—is Peter Magda's true love, a love that she has denied herself?

== Cast ==
Actor	Role	Status
Joanna Brodzik	Magda Miłowicz	2005–2007
Paweł Małaszyński	Piotr Korzecki	2005–2007
Ewa Kasprzyk	Teresa Miłowicz	2005–2007
Bartłomiej Świderski	Sebastian Lewicki	2005–2007
Daria Widawska	Agata Bielecka	2005–2007
Krzysztof Stelmaszyk	Wiktor Waligóra	2005–2007
Katarzyna Herman	Karolina Waligóra	2005–2007
Bartek Kasprzykowski	Wojciech Płaska	2005–2007
Katarzyna Bujakiewicz	Mariola Adamska-Płaska	2005–2007
Szymon Bobrowski	Bartek Malicki	2005–2007
Jacek Braciak	Łukasz Zaniewicz	2005–2007
Patrycja Durska	Kasia Robecka-Zaniewicz	2005–2007

== Ratings ==
Season	Timeslot	TV Season	Viewers (in millions)	Viewers (season finale)
1st	Tuesday 9:30PM	Fall 2005	2.91	2.93
2nd	Tuesday 9:30PM	Spring 2006	2.97	2.92
3rd	Tuesday 9:30PM	Fall 2006	3.50	4.58
4th	Tuesday 9:30PM	Spring 2007	3.72	4.10
