= Sara (1997 film) =

- Directed by: Maciej Ślesicki
- Written by: Maciej Ślesicki
- Produced by: Pavel Poppe; Lew Rywin
- Starring: Bogusław Linda; Agnieszka Włodarczyk
- Cinematography: Andrzej Ramlau
- Edited by: Eva Smol
- Music by: Marek Stefankiewicz
- Production company: Heritage Films
- Release date: May 23, 1997 (Poland)
- Running time: 100 minutes
- Country: Poland
- Language: Polish
- Budget: $$835 000

Sara is a 1997 Polish film directed by Maciej Ślesicki.

== Plot ==
Leon (Bogusław Linda), a former commando, returns home after a job in Yugoslavia. One of his young daughters pulls a gun out of her luggage and targets another daughter.

After his wife has left him, and Leon has lost himself in booze, he is roused for an interview with a local criminal ringleader, Jozef (Marek Perepeczko), who is looking for a bodyguard for his 16-year-old daughter, Sara (Agnieszka Włodarczyk). During the interview an attempt is made to assassinate Jozef, and Leon's quick action saves his life. Leon is awarded the job.

Sara at first appears unenthusiastic about her new bodyguard, but during an assassination attempt on her, he protects her with his body. Sara falls in love with Leon. Initially, Leon is wary of Sara's attentions, but sincere and tender feelings for the girl eventually conquer his heart. Leon and Sara become lovers. Soon Sara becomes pregnant. Another criminal bigwig comes into possession of compromising photos and passes them to Jozef. A confrontation ensues.

== Cast ==
- Bogusław Linda as Leon
- Agnieszka Włodarczyk as Sara
- Marek Perepeczko as Joseph
- Cezary Pazura as Cezary, guard
- Stanisław Brudny as Leon's father
- Krzysztof Kiersznowski as
- Jack Recknitz as Jozef's man
- Grzegorz Miśtal as Sara's classmate
- Teresa Lipowska as saleslady
- Jarosław Gruda as Gynaecologist

== Production ==
To appear nude in this film, Agnieszka Włodarczyk, who was 16-years-old during filming, needed the consent of her mother Anna Stasiukiewicz. Her mother persuaded her to play in the film and to begin her career in show business.

== Awards and nominations ==
- 1997 – Award Film Festival in Gdynia (Maciej Ślesicki)
- 1999 – Award for the best debut at the festival Stozhary (Agnieszka Wlodarczyk)
