= Marek Perepeczko =

Polish actor

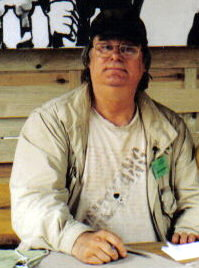
- Born: Marek Perepeczko; 3 April 1942; Warsaw, Poland
- Died: 17 November 2005 (aged 63); Częstochowa, Poland
- Occupation: Actor/Theater director
- Years active: 1960–2005
- Spouse: Agnieszka Perepeczko (1967–2005)

Marek Perepeczko (3 April 1942 – 17 November 2005) was a popular Polish movie and theatrical actor.

== Career ==
Between 1960 and 1961, he appeared in Andrzej Konic's Poetic Studio (Studio Poetyckie Andrzeja Konica) in TVP (Polish Television/Telewizja Polska). Perepeczko graduated from Aleksander Zelwerowicz State Theatre Academy in Warsaw in 1965. He debuted on the stage the same year. Between 1966 and 1969, he appeared on the stage of the Klasyczny (Classical) Theatre in Warsaw and between 1970 and 1977, he was a director of Komedia Theatre. In the 1980s, Marek Perepeczko resided outside Poland and from 1998, he was an actor and director of Teatr Adama Mickiewicza (Adam Mickiewicz Theatre) in Częstochowa. Marek Perepeczko was one of the most famous Polish actors. He is most remembered for his roles in Janosik, 13 Posterunek and Kolumbowie.

== Personal life ==
He was married to Agnieszka Fitkau-Perepeczko.

== Filmography ==
- Trzeba Gleboko Oddychac, rez. Mira Hamermesh (1964)
- Potem nastąpi cisza (1965)
- Zejście do piekła (1966)
- Wilcze echa (1968)
- Polowanie na muchy (1969)
- Gniewko, syn rybaka, TV series (1968–1970)
- Pan Wołodyjowski (1969)
- Przygody pana Michała, TV series (1969)
- Brzezina (1970)
- Kolumbowie, TV series (1970)
- Przygoda Stasia (1970), as Staś's father
- Motodrama (1971)
- Wesele (1972)
- Janosik, TV series (1973) as Janosik
- Janosik (1974), as Janosik
- Awans (1974)
- Śmierć autostopowiczek (Smrt stopařek) (1979)
- 13 posterunek, TV series (1997–1998) as Komendant nadkomisarz Władysław Słoik
- Sara (1997)
- Pan Tadeusz (1999)
- 13 posterunek 2, TV series (2000) as Komendant nadkomisarz Władysław Słoik
- Atrakcyjny pozna panią... (2004)
- Dublerzy (2005)
