= Janosik (TV series) =

Polish television series

Janosik is a Polish television series filmed in 1973 which premiered on TVP on July 26, 1974. It is about a famous Goral outlaw (named after Slovak Juraj Jánošík) who in folk legends, like Robin Hood, steals money and goods from the rich and helps out the poor. The series was directed by Jerzy Passendorfer, the screenplay was written by Tadeusz Kwiatkowski, the music was composed by Jerzy Matuszkiewicz and the cinematography was by Stefan Pindelski. The series consist of 13 episodes, each lasting approximately 45 minutes.

== Plot ==
The series takes place at the beginning of the 19th century in Podhale, in Poland under Austrian rule. Polish Góral Janosik is arrested for defending a peasant being flogged on the orders of an Austrian count. In the dungeons, he meets highwaymen and, together with them, organizes an escape, after which he joins the bandit group and soon he becomes their leader.

== List of episodes ==
- First teachings
- Robbery laws
- In a foreign skin
- Kidnapping
- The robbers were dancing
- A bag of thalers
- A barrel of spirits
- Good price
- Recruitment
- All for one
- Difficult - love!
- Two highlanders fought
- Betrayal

== Cast ==
- Janosik - Marek Perepeczko
- Kwiczoł - Bogusz Bilewski
- Maryna - Ewa Lemańska
- Pyzdra - Witold Pyrkosz
- Murgrabia - Marian Kociniak
- Count Horvath - Mieczysław Czechowicz
- Klarysa, doughter of Count - Anna Dymna
- Jakubek - Wiktor Sadecki
- Prison guard - Mieczysław Waśkowski

== See also ==
- Podhale
- Tatra Mountains
- Pieniny
- St. Michael Archangel's Church, Dębno
- Mała Armia Janosika
