= Tomasz Łosowski =

Polish drummer (born 1973)

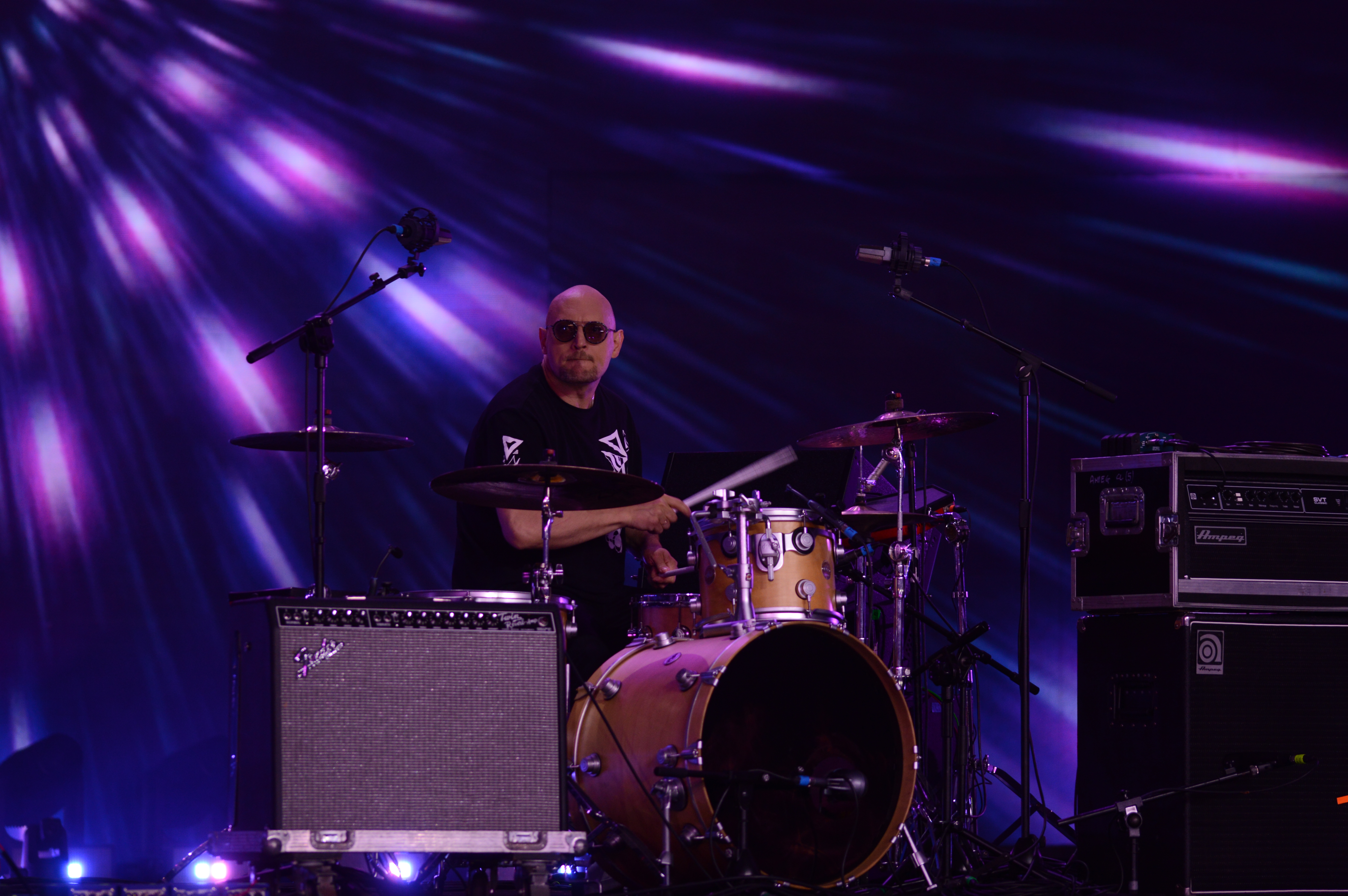
Tomasz Łosowski (2022)

Tomasz Łosowski (born September 28, 1973), is a Polish jazz and session drummer. He played with such musicians and bands like, ΠR2, Kombi, Wojtek Pilichowski, Robert Janson, Leszek Możdżer and Marek Biliński.

Over the past three decades, Tomasz has collaborated with leading figures in Polish pop, rock, and jazz scenes, contributing to over fifty albums, including four solo projects. He is also a lecturer, conducting nationwide music workshops and "drum clinic" performances.

Tomasz is also the pioneer of the first professional video drumming school in Poland and has received a Gloria Artist Award.

== Selected discography ==
- Tomasz Łosowski 30 Lecie (2021 MTJ)
- Tomasz Łosowski Fusionland (2016 Soliton)
- Tomasz Łosowski C.V. Remastered (2018 Soliton)

Kombi / Łosowski

- Koncert 15-lecia (1993, AGM Production)
- Nowe narodziny (1995, X-Serwis)
- Zaczarowane miasto (2009, MTJ)
- Live (2013, MTJ)
- Nowy album (2016, Fonografika)
- Minerał życia (2021, SL Sound)

Wojtek Pilichowski

- Granat (1996, Poly Gram Polska)
- Pi (2001, Pomaton EMI)

Leszek Możdżer

- Pub 700 (2004, Fonografika)

Orange Trane

- Obertas (1997, Polonia Records)
- My personal Friend (1998, Npt two)
- Wolność (2019, MTJ)
