= Robert Moskwa =

Polish actor (born 1965)

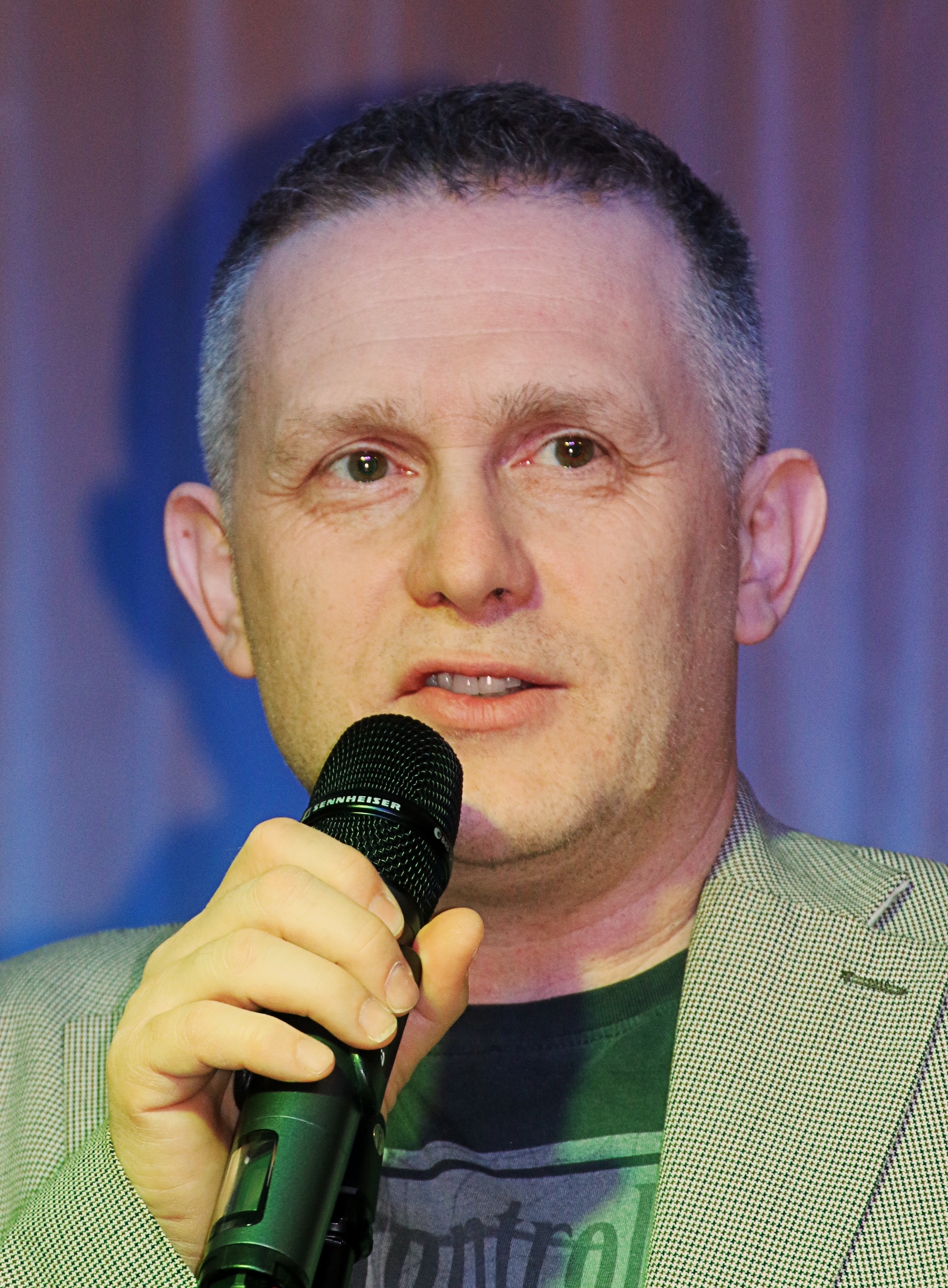
Robert Moskwa

Robert Moskwa (born 13 November 1965 in Wrocław) is a Polish actor.

== Filmography ==
- 1991: A woman at war (Not Credited)
- 1991: Kroll
- 1998-1999: Życie jak poker
- 2004–present: M jak miłość
- 2007: Manfred Tryb
- 2007: Tylko miłość
