= O.N.A. =

Polish rock band

- Origin: Poland
- Genres: Grunge; alternative rock; alternative metal; hard rock; pop rock
- Years active: 1994–2003
- Labels: MJM Music PL, Columbia Records, Sony Music Entertainment Poland
- Past members: Grzegorz Skawiński; Waldemar Tkaczyk; Zbigniew Kraszewski; Wojciech Horny; Agnieszka Chylińska

O.N.A. was a Polish rock band formed in 1994.

The band was formed by musicians who had previously played together: Skawiński and Tkaczyk were in a band named Kombi; Kraszewski previously played in Kombi and TSA.

Grzegorz Skawiński was the leader of the band and the composer. Agnieszka Chylińska was the lyric writer and the vocalist.

== Discography ==
=== Albums ===
Title	Album details	Peak chart positions	Sales	Certifications
Title	Album details	POL	Sales	Certifications
Modlishka	Released: 25 May 1995; Label: MJM Music PL; Formats: CD, CS	47	POL: 100,000+	POL: Gold
Bzzzzz	Released: 21 September 1996; Label: Columbia Records Poland; Formats: CD, CS	—	POL: 400,000+	POL: 2× Platinum
T.R.I.P.	Released: 1 May 1998; Label: Columbia Records Poland; Formats: CD, CS	—	POL: 100,000+	POL: Platinum
Pieprz	Released: 23 November 1999; Label: Columbia Records Poland; Formats: CD, CS	—	POL: 50,000+	POL: Gold
Mrok	Released: 29 October 2001; Label: Sony Music Poland; Formats: CD, CS	4	POL: 50,000+	POL: Gold
"—" denotes a recording that did not chart or was not released in that territory.

=== Compilations ===
Title	Album details	Peak chart positions
Title	Album details	POL
To naprawdę już koniec 1995–2003	Released: 24 March 2003; Label: Sony Music Poland; Formats: CD, CD+DVD	30
"—" denotes a recording that did not chart or was not released in that territory.

=== Remix albums ===
Title	Album details
re-T.R.I.P.	Released: 28 May 1998; Label: Columbia Records Poland; Formats: CD, CS

== O.N.A. in the movies ==
In 1997 two of the band's songs were featured in a movie Musisz żyć (You've Got to Live, directed by Konrad Szołajski, 2000): Białe ściany and Kiedy powiem sobie dość. The band members appeared as cameos in one of the scenes.

In 1997 also Mimo wszystko was featured on a soundtrack to the movie Młode Wilki 1/2 (Young Wolves 1/2), directed by Jarosław Zamojda.

Grzegorz Skawiński wrote music for the movie Ostatnia misja (Last Mission), directed by Wojciech Wójcik in 2000. There was also the song Moja odpowiedź on the soundtrack.
