= Kombi (band) =

Polish band

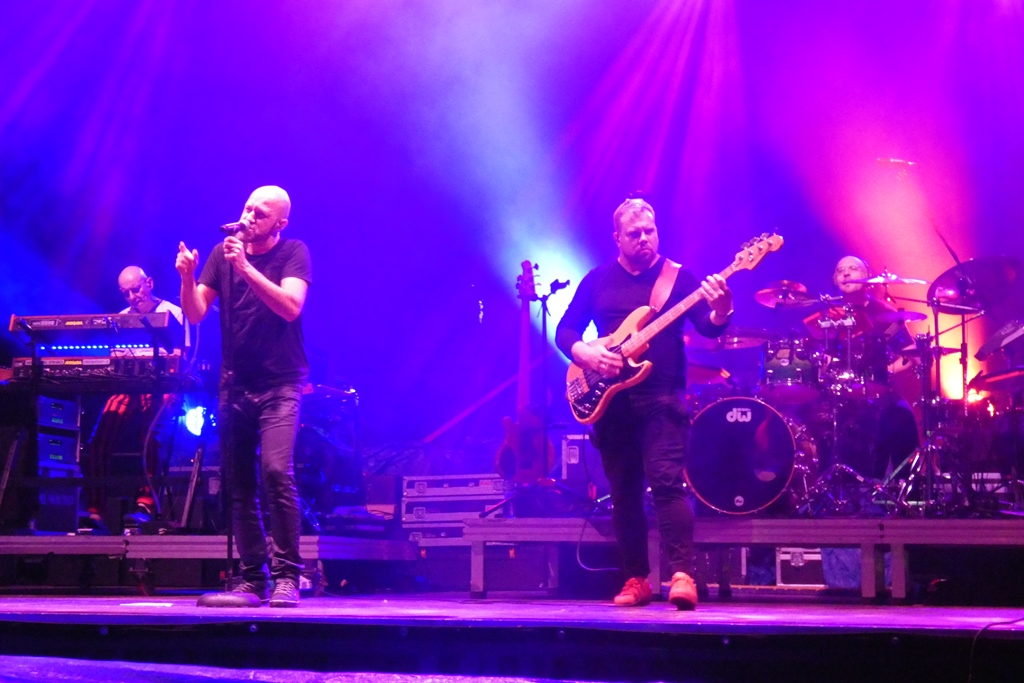
- Kombi performing in 2019

Background information
- Also known as: Akcenty, Kombi Łosowski
- Origin: Gdańsk, Poland
- Genres: Funk rock, synth-pop
- Years active: 1969–1976 (Akcenty), 1976-1992, 2013-2022 (Kombi)
- Labels: Tonpress, Pronit, Wifon, Polskie Nagrania Muza
- Past members: Grzegorz Skawiński, Waldemar Tkaczyk, Jan Pluta, Mariusz Bryl, Benedykt Musioł, Ryszard Gębura, Przemysław Pahl, Zbigniew Kraszewski, Jerzy Piotrowski, Tomasz Łosowski, Sławomir Łosowski
- Website: kombi.pl

Kombi was a Polish funk rock band, founded in 1969 in Gdańsk by Sławomir Łosowski. In the beginning, the group played mostly experimental, jazz music. In second half of the 1970s they turned into funk rock, later their style turned towards synth-pop. They used such musical equipment as Commodore 64 as a MIDI sequencer, Prophet 5, Yamaha DX-7 synthesizer, Simmons SDSV electronic drum kit and Roland TR-808 drum machine. The band was known for its characteristic sound, based on state-of-the-art electronic instruments programmed (and often modified) by Łosowski, distinctive vocals and guitar playing by Skawiński and Tkaczyk's bass slapping style. Their most popular songs include "Słodkiego miłego życia", "Nasze randez-vous", "Black and White", "Kochać cię – za późno", "Za ciosem cios", "Nie ma zysku", "Przytul mnie", "Królowie życia" and "Nietykalni – skamieniałe zło".

== History ==
The band previously performed as Akcenty, and played their first live gig as Kombi in August 1976. In 1979, they released their first single "Wspomnienia z pleneru" and published three songs on a compilation Muzyka młodej generacji. Their debut album Kombi followed in 1980. In the same year, the band started recording their second album Królowie życia, which they released in 1981.

Their 1983 single "Inwazja z Plutona" introduced the new style influenced by synthesizers. The group's third album, Nowy rozdział recorded in 1983 and released the following year, was dominated by synth-pop and included their biggest hit "Słodkiego miłego życia" as well as popular songs "Kochać cię – za późno" and "Nie ma zysku". At the 21st National Festival of Polish Song in Opole in 1984, Kombi won the audience award for "Słodkiego miłego życia". The band released their next album Kombi 4 in 1985, and the LP included hits "Nasze randez-vous" and "Black and White". The following year, to commemorate Kombi's 10th anniversary, the band embarked on a tour.

1989 saw the release of their last studio album, Tabu, recorded the year before, which spawned the politically charged hit "Nietykalni – skamieniałe zło". In 1991, the group re-recorded their hits for the new album The Best of Kombi. They split up in 1992 due to musical plans of Grzegorz Skawiński, after that Łosowski decided to suspend band, and stopped finding new musicians for Kombi due to difficult personal situation.

In 2003, Skawiński, Tkaczyk and Pluta re-formed the band as Kombii without Łosowski, inviting a new keyboardist Bartosz Wielgosz to join them. Łosowski did not acknowledge the band, so in 2004 he formed a band called Łosowski and released a new album Zaczarowane miasto in 2009. In 2013, band changed name to Kombi, adding his surname to it in order not to be confused with the group of Skawiński and Tkaczyk. At the same year, Kombi Łosowski released "Live" album, with a concert in Grudziądz, and in 2016 "Nowy Album" (eng. New Album) had its premiere. In 2022 band changed name to Kombi Łosowski, following a court case with the band Kombii, over rights to the band name.

== Discography ==
- 1980: Kombi
- 1981: Królowie życia
- 1984: Nowy rozdział
- 1985: Kombi 4
- 1986: 10 Years – The Best of Kombi – Live
- 1989: Tabu
- 1990: 15 lat
- 1991: The Best of Kombi
- 1993: Koncert 15-lecia
- 1993: The Singles
- 1998: Gold
- 2009: Zaczarowane miasto
- 2013: Live
- 2016: Nowy album
- 2017: Koncert 40-lecia
- 2019: Bez Ograniczeń Energii 5-10-50

== Band members ==
Finał line-up

- Sławomir Łosowski – synthesizer, programming, leader (1969-1992), vocal (1970-1975, 1983), drum machine (1986-1990)
- Tomasz Łosowski – drums (1991-1992)
- Grzegorz Skawiński – guitar, vocal (1975-1992)
- Waldemar Tkaczyk – bass guitar (1975-1992)

Former members

- Jan Schwartz - vocal (1969)
- Lech Badełek - guitar (1969-1970)
- Jacek Tomaszewski - bass guitar (1969)
- Henryk Sikora - bass guitar (1970)
- Piotr Gągałka - bass guitar (1971-1974)
- Zbigniew Gura - bass guitar (1975)
- Zbigniew Sentowski - bass guitar, vocal (1975)
- Andrzej Kyś - drums (1969-1971)
- Jan Rucki - drums (1972-1974)
- Jan Pluta – drums (1975-1976, 1978-1981, occasionally 1986-1989)
- Mariusz Bryl – drums (1977)
- Benedykt Musioł – drums (1977)
- Ryszard Gębura – drums (1977-1979)
- Przemysław Pahl – drums (1980)
- Zbigniew Kraszewski – drums (1982)
- Jerzy Piotrowski – drums (1981-1982, 1983-1986, touring guest 28 july 1991)
