= Dominika Chorosińska =

Polish politician (born 1978)

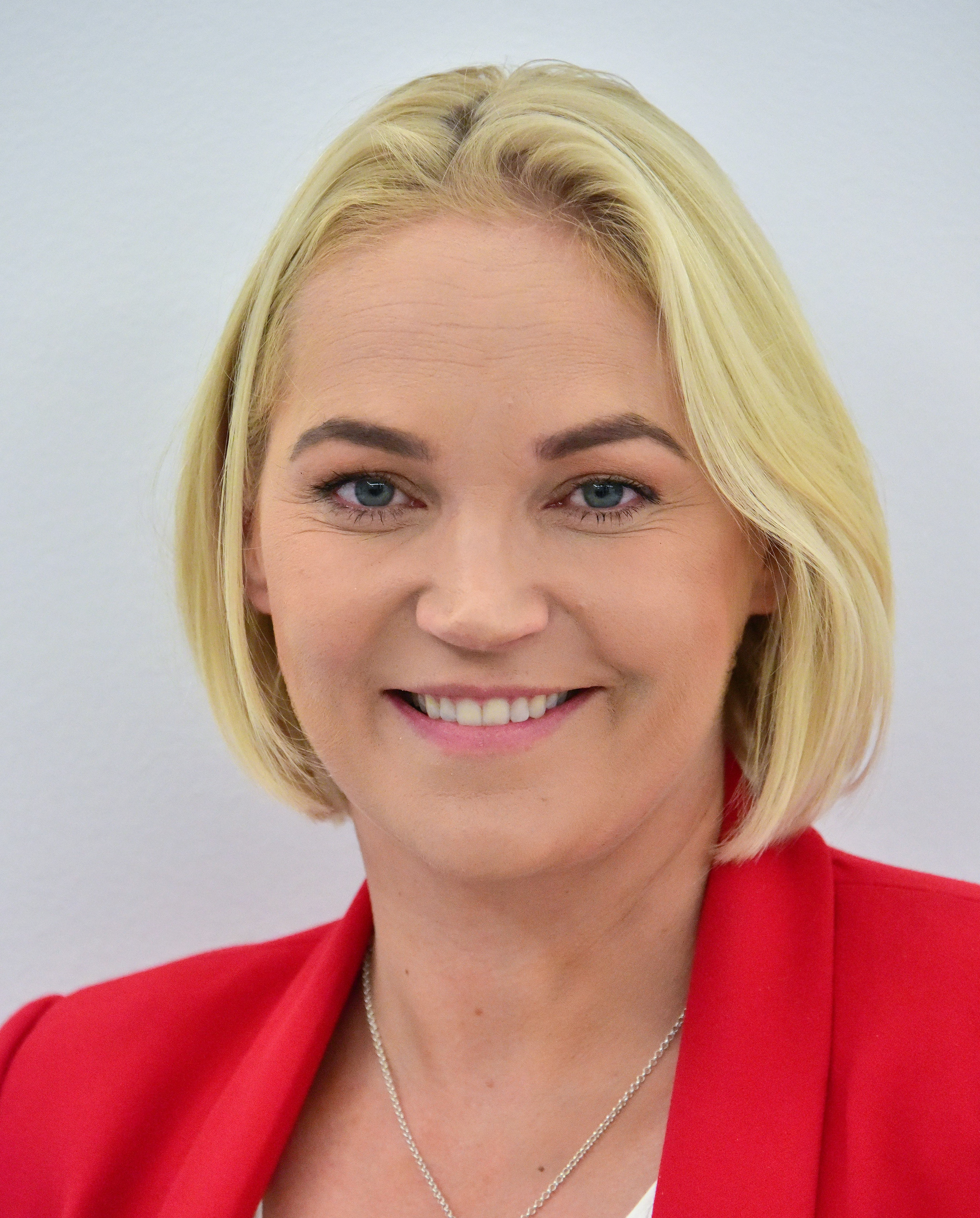
- Chorosińska in 2019

Minister of Culture, National Heritage and Sport
- In office 27 November 2023 – 13 December 2023
- President: Andrzej Duda
- Prime Minister: Mateusz Morawiecki
- Preceded by: Piotr Gliński
- Succeeded by: Bartłomiej Sienkiewicz

Member of the Sejm
- Incumbent
- Assumed office 12 November 2019
- Constituency: Warsaw II

Personal details
- Born: Dominika Figurska; 28 December 1978 (age 47) Elbląg, Poland
- Party: Law and Justice
- Spouse: Michał Chorosiński
- Children: 6
- Education: AST National Academy of Theatre Arts in Kraków
- Occupation: politician, actress

Dominika Małgorzata Chorosińska (née Figurska; born 28 December 1978 in Elbląg) is a Polish politician from Law and Justice and former actress. She has been a Member of the Sejm since 2019. She also served as Minister of Culture and National Heritage for two weeks from 27 November to 13 December 2023.

== Filmography ==
- Egzekutor (1999)
- Skok (1999)
- 6 dni strusia (2000)
- Enduro Bojz (2000)
- Nie ma zmiłuj (2000)
- Zostać miss (2001)
- M jak miłość (2002–2008)
