= Grzegorz Skawiński =

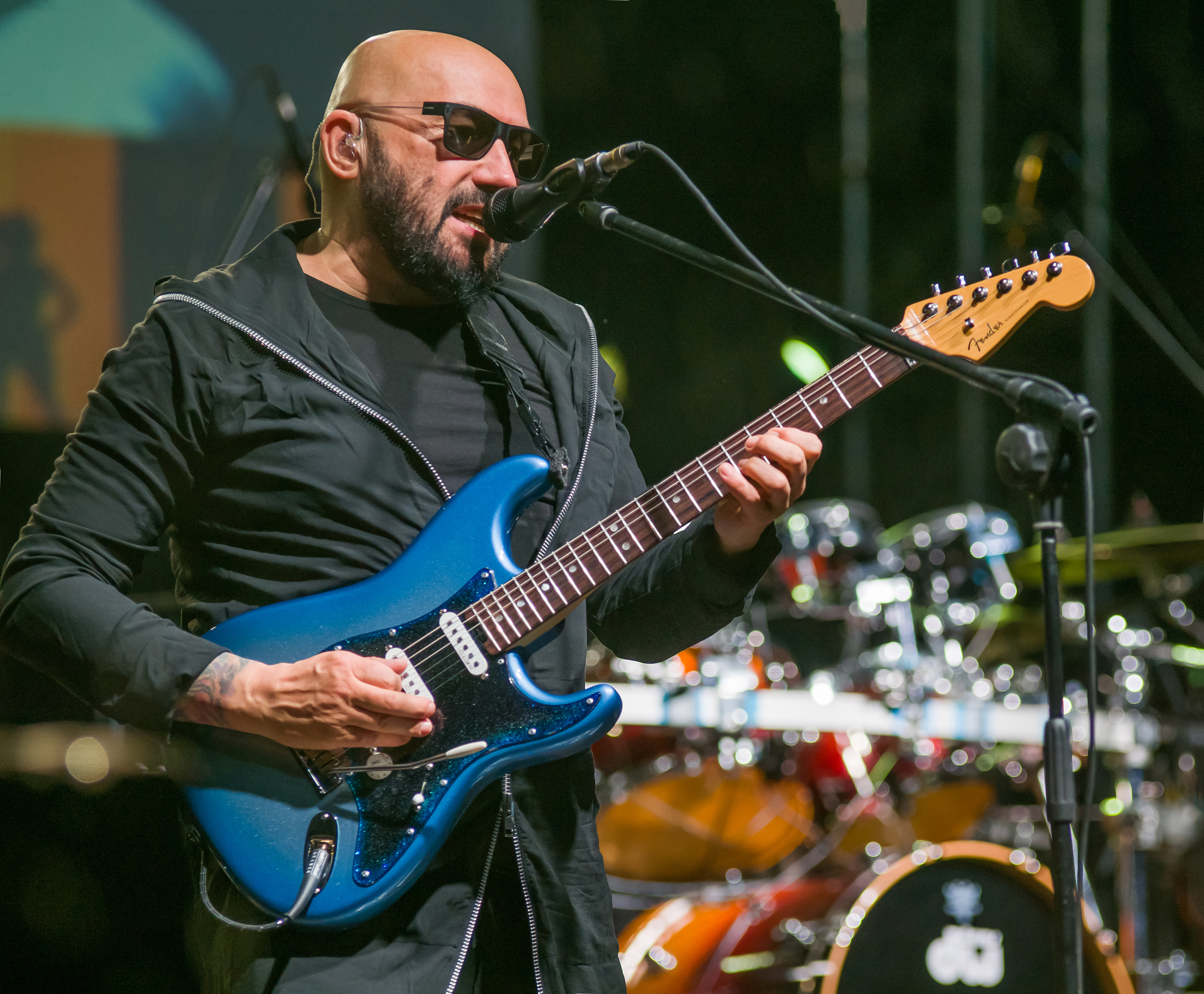
- Grzegorz Skawiński, 2017

Background information
- Also known as: Skawa
- Born: Grzegorz Bogdan Skawiński; July 6, 1954 (age 72)
- Origin: Mława, Poland
- Genres: pop, rock, heavy metal
- Occupations: Musician, singer
- Instruments: Guitar, keyboards
- Years active: 1973–present
- Labels: Polskie Nagrania Muza, Sony Music Entertainment Poland, Universal Music Poland
- Website: grzegorzskawinski.pl

Grzegorz Bogdan Skawiński (July 6, 1954, Mława) is a Polish pop-rock musician, guitarist, singer, composer and record producer. He was the leader of the band O.N.A., and is a member of the Phonographic Academy ZPAV.

Skawiński graduated from Wyspiański High School in Mława, where he met Waldemar Tkaczyk. Together they founded the band Kameleon. In 1974 both musicians were members of the band Akcenty, which became Kombi. The group disbanded in 1992. At the end of the 1980s he began a solo career as Skawiński, and in 1991 along with Waldemar Tkaczyk, Zbigniew Kraszewski and Piotr Łukaszewski founded the group Skawalker.

== Discography ==
=== Solo albums ===
Title	Album details	Peak chart positions
Title	Album details	POL
Skawiński	Released: 1989; Label: Polskie Nagrania Muza; Formats: LP	—
Ostatnia misja	Released: March 30, 2000; Label: Sony Music Entertainment Poland; Formats: CD	—
Me & My Guitar	Released: March 12, 2012; Label: Universal Music Poland; Formats: CD, digital download	7
"—" denotes a recording that did not chart or was not released in that territory.
