= Bartłomiej Świderski =

Polish actor and singer

- Born: 7 March 1973 (age 53); Bielawa, Poland
- Occupations: Actor, musician, singer
- Years active: 1996–present
- Musical career
- Genres: Indie pop
- Label: Mystic Production
- Formerly of: Grejfrut
- Website: www.bartekswiderski.pl

Bartłomiej Świderski (born 7 March 1973 in Wrocław, Poland) is a Polish actor and singer. He was the vocalist of the former group Grejfrut, and has now embarked on a solo singing career.

Świderski attended the Bolesław Chrobry High School in Bielawa, following which he graduated from Lart studiO acting school in Kraków in 1994 and the National Film School in Łódź in 1998.

== Filmography ==
- 2016–2017: Druga szansa as Marcin Kryński, Monika's partner
- 2007–2008: Tylko miłość as Rafał Rozner, a single father
- 2006: Fala zbrodni as Ernest von Stein
- 2006: Kryminalni as Dominik Czerny vel Zaleski
- 2005–2007: Magda M. as Sebastian Lewicki
- 2005: Zakochany Anioł as Paweł
- 2005: 1409. Afera na zamku Bartenstein as Eryk
- 2004: Cud w Krakowie (Csoda Krakkóban) as Aurel
- 2002: Break Point
- 2002–2003: Kasia i Tomek as Irek, Kasia's ex-boyfriend (voice only)
- 2002: Sfora as informer
- 2002–2006: Samo Życie as Leszek Retman
- 2001: Avalon as Stunner
- 2001: Marszałek Piłsudski as Bronisław Piłsudski, Józef's brother
- 1999: Ostatnia misja as a policeman
- 1999: Prawo Ojca as Commissar Orłowski
- 1999: Jak narkotyk as Marta's acquaintance
- 1995: Młode wilki as a border guard

== Discography ==
=== Studio albums ===
Title	Album details
Świderski	Released: September 21, 2009; Label: Mystic Production; Formats: CD

=== Music videos ===
Title	Year	Album	Ref
"Hotel Isabel"	2009	Świderski	
"Kameleon"	2009	Świderski	
