= Maciej Ślesicki =

Polish film producer and screenwriter

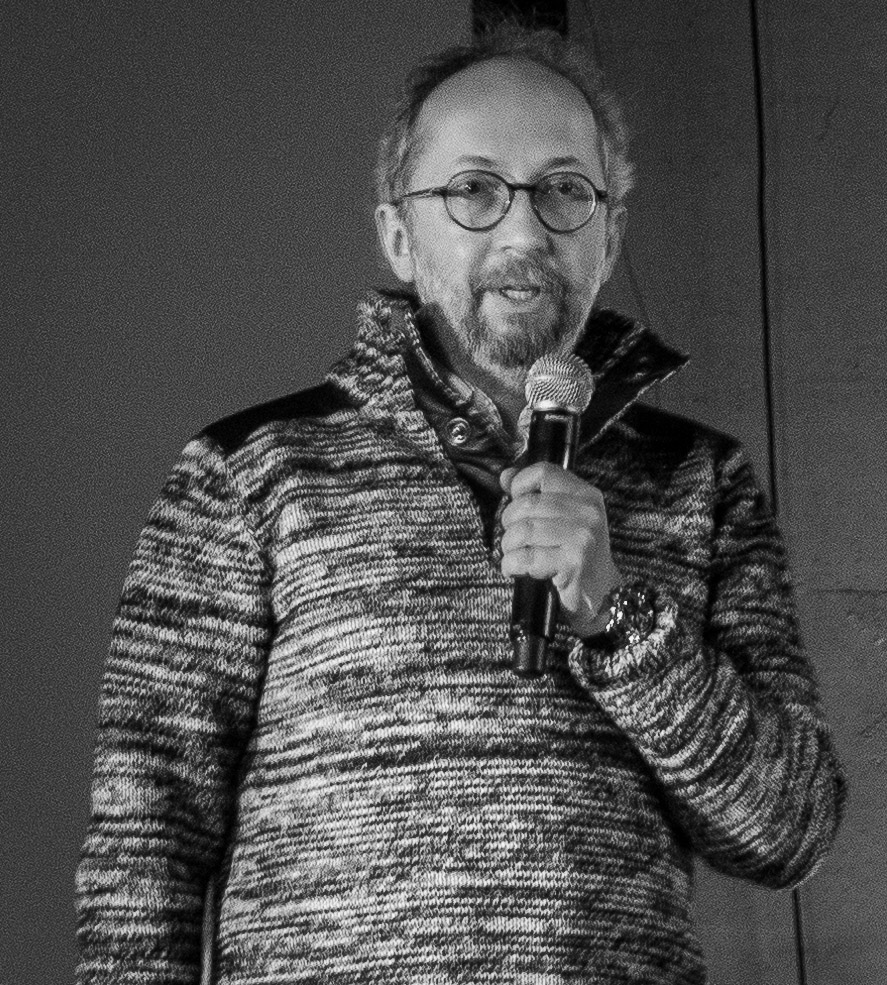
Maciej Ślesicki October 10, 2013

Maciej Wojciech Slesicki (born 1966 in Warsaw) is a Polish film director and screenwriter, co-founder and lecturer at the Warsaw Film School.

His mother was film producer Barbara Pec-Ślesicka.

== Awards and nominations ==
- 1995: The Polish Gdynia Film Festival - Award for directing (Tato)
- 1996: Golden Duck magazine Film in the category of best Polish film; for the year 1995 (Tato)
- 1996: Tarnów Film Award awarded by the jury youth for his directorial debut (Tato)
- 1996: Tarnów Film Award Maszkaron - Audience Award (Tato)
- 1997: Distributor Award at the Polish Film Festival in Gdynia (Sara)
- 2003: Grand Prize Laurel Yew MF Film-Music-Painting Summer of Muses in Nowogard (Show)
- 2015: 87th Academy Awards - Nomination Best Documentary (Short Subject) (Nasza klątwa) - Producer
- 2021: 94th Academy Awards - Nomination Best Live Action Short Film (The Dress) - Producer
