= Mira Hamermesh =

- Born: 15 July 1923; Lodz, Poland
- Died: 19 February 2012 (aged 88); London, England, UK
- Education: Slade School of Art
- Website: http://www.mira-hamermesh.co.uk/ATAKEHOME/index.html

Mira Hamermesh (15 July 1923 - 19 February 2012) was an independent Polish filmmaker and artist who made documentaries for British television. She was a student of painting at the Bezalel Art School in Jerusalem and later moved to London to study at the Slade School of Art. Mira returned to Poland in 1960 to study at the polish film school where she began documenting her personal experience of fleeing Nazi occupied Germany as a Jewish teenager.

== Early life and education ==
Mira Hamermesh was born in Lodz, Poland in 1923. She was the youngest of three children and lived with her middle class parents in Lodz, where her father ran a rubber factory.

In November 1939, Mira chose to leave Poland, with her younger brother Mietek, after the Germans invaded on 5 September 1939. Mira managed to make it to Palestine in 1941, where she was reunited with her sister Genia. Mira's mother died in the Łódź Ghetto and her father was murdered in Auschwitz.

Mira first studied painting at the Bezalel Art School in Poland before moving to London to study at the Slade School of Art and finally returned to Poland in 1960 to attend Polish Film School.

== Career ==
Mira was given an exhibition by the British Council in 1946 and was awarded a solo exhibition in 1960 from the Brook Street Gallery. She returned to her hometown of Lodz in 1960 and began making films.

She published her personal memoir, The River of Angry Dogs: a memoir in 2004.

== Personal life ==
She married Richard Coopman in 1962. She had at least one child, a son, Jeremy.

Aged 88, Mira Hamermesh died in London, Uk, on 19 February 2012.

== Awards and honours ==
- Prix Italia, for Maids and Madams, Channel 4
- Best international affairs programme, Royal Television Society, 1986
- Special jury award, Banff festival, 1986
- Golden Gate award, San Francisco international film festival, 1992

== Filmography ==
- End of Term (1964)
- Passport (1967)
- Two Women (1972)
- Maids and Madams (1985)
- Talking to the Enemy (1987)
- Caste at Birth (1990)
- Loving the Dead (1991)
