= Taniec z gwiazdami season 14 =

Taniec z gwiazdami
- Season 14
- Hosted by: Krzysztof Ibisz; Anna Głogowska
- Judges: Andrzej Grabowski; Iwona Pavlović; Beata Tyszkiewicz; Michał Malitowski
- Celebrity winner: Aneta Zając
- Professional winner: Stefano Terrazzino
- No. of episodes: 11

Release
- Original network: Polsat
- Original release: 7 March – 23 May 2014

Season chronology
- ← Previous; 13 Next → 15

The 14th season of Taniec z Gwiazdami, the Polish edition of Dancing With the Stars, started on 7 March 2014. Unlike the previous thirteen seasons, this one was aired on Polsat TV network. It was hosted by Krzysztof Ibisz and Anna Głogowska, season 13 professional champion. Beata Tyszkiewicz and Iwona Pavlović returned as judges, joined by a ballroom dancer and former World Latin Dance Champion Michał Malitowski as well as an actor Andrzej Grabowski.

On 23 May, Aneta Zając and her partner Stefano Terrazzino were crowned the champions, becoming the lowest scoring couple to ever win the show. It also marks the third time in history of the show the winning couple was outside the judges' top three. With three wins, Terrazzino is currently the most successful professional dancer in history of the show.

== Couples ==
Celebrity	Occupation	Professional partner	Status
Violetta Arlak	Ranczo actress	Krzysztof Hulboj	Eliminated 1st on 7 March 2014
Jacek Lenartowicz	M jak miłość actor	Paulina Biernat	Eliminated 2nd on 14 March 2014
Antoni Królikowski	Film and television actor	Kamila Kajak	Eliminated 3rd on 21 March 2014
Karolina Szostak	Polsat sports presenter	Andrej Mosejcuk	Eliminated 4th on 28 March 2014
Natalia Siwiec	Miss Euro 2012, model and reality television star	Jan Kliment	Eliminated 5th on 4 April 2014
Rafał Brzozowski	Singer and The Voice of Poland semi-finalist	Izabela Janachowska	Eliminated 6th on 11 April 2014
Jacek Rozenek	Film and television actor	Magdalena Soszyńska-Michno	Eliminated 7th on 25 April 2014
Piotr Gruszka	Volleyball player and European Champion 2009	Nina Tyrka	Eliminated 8th on 2 May 2014
Klaudia Halejcio	Film and television actress	Tomasz Barański	Eliminated 9th on 9 May 2014
Dawid Kwiatkowski	Singer	Janja Lesar	Third place on 16 May 2014
Joanna Moro	Anna German. Tajemnica białego anioła actress	Rafał Maserak	Runners-up on 23 May 2014
Aneta Zając	Pierwsza miłość actress	Stefano Terrazzino	Winners on 23 May 2014

== Scores ==
Couple	Place	1	2	3	4	5	6	7	8	9	10	11
Aneta & Stefano	1	26	—	28	30	40†	27	35	28+33=61‡	31+33=64‡	31+33=64‡	37+40+40=117‡
Joanna & Rafał	2	32†	—	39†	34	38	37†	40†	38+40=78†	37+37=74†	39+40=79†	39+40+40=119†
Dawid & Janja	3	—	35†	35	34	33	36	40†	38+39=77	39+32=71	37+33=70	
Klaudia & Tomasz	4	29	—	36	35	38	32	38	40+36=76	33+40=73		
Piotr & Nina	5	—	25	33	31	23‡	25	31‡	29+32=61‡			
Jacek & Magdalena	6	—	34	26	26	33	37†	32				
Rafał & Izabela	7	—	28	31	31	34	24‡					
Natalia & Jan	8	18‡	—	18‡	36†	30						
Karolina & Andrej	9	22	—	19	23‡							
Antoni & Kamila	10	—	22	28								
Jacek & Paulina	11	—	20‡									
Violetta & Krzysztof	12	27										

Red numbers indicate the lowest score for each week.
Green numbers indicate the highest score for each week.
indicates the couple eliminated that week.
indicates the returning couple that finished in the bottom two.
indicates the returning couple that was the last to be called safe.
indicates the winning couple.
indicates the runner-up.

Notes:

Week 1: Joanna Moro scored 32 out of 40 for her Waltz, making it the highest score in this episode. It was the lowest of the highest ratings in the first episode ever (the same situation was, however, in the 3rd and 4th season). Natalia Siwiec got 18 points for her Cha-cha-cha, making it the lowest score of the week. Violetta & Krzysztof were eliminated despite being 9 points from the bottom.

Week 2: Dawid Kwiatkowski scored 35 out of 40 for his Cha-cha-cha, making it the highest score in this episode. Jacek Lenartowicz got 20 points for his Waltz, making it the lowest score of the week. Jacek & Paulina were eliminated.

Week 3: Joanna Moro scored 39 out of 40 for her Rumba, making it the highest score in this episode. Natalia Siwiec got 18 points for her Tango, making it the lowest score of the week. Antoni & Kamila were eliminated despite being 10 points from the bottom.

Week 4: Natalia Siwiec scored 36 out of 40 for her Paso Doble, making it the highest score in this episode. Michał Malitowski gave his first 10 to Natalia's Paso Doble. Karolina Szostak got 23 points for her Tango, making it the lowest score of the week. Karolina & Andrej were eliminated.

Week 5: Aneta Zając received the first perfect score of the season for her Rumba. Piotr Gruszka got 23 points for his Paso Doble, making it the lowest score of the week. Natalia & Jan were eliminated despite being 7 points from the bottom.

Week 6: All couples danced to love songs. There was a two-way tie on the first place, with Joanna Moro and Jacek Rozenek all getting 37 out of 40. Rafał Brzozowski got 24 points for his Cha-cha-cha, making it the lowest score of the week. Rafał & Izabela were eliminated.

Week 7: All couples danced Fushion. Joanna Moro and Dawid Kwiatkowski got their first perfect scores. Piotr Gruszka got 31 points for his Rumba Foxtrot, making it the lowest score of the week. Jacek & Magdalena were eliminated despite being 1 point from the bottom.

Week 8: Klaudia Halejcio received the first perfect score for her American Smooth. Joanna Moro received her second perfect score for the Charleston. Aneta Zając got 28 points for her Rumba, making it the lowest score of the week. Piotr & Nina were eliminated.

Week 9: All couples danced to Diva's songs. Klaudia Halejcio received her second perfect score for the Samba. Aneta Zając got 31 points for her Quickstep, making it the lowest score of the week. Klaudia & Tomasz were eliminated despite being 9 points from the bottom.

Week 10: All couples danced to Hollywood songs from movies. Joanna Moro received her third perfect score for the Quickstep. Aneta Zając got 31 points for her Foxtrot, making it the lowest score of the week. Dawid & Janja were eliminated despite being 15 points from the bottom. In Season 10 Janja Leser danced with Michał Kwiatkowski, brother of Dawid Kwiatkowski. They were albo eliminated in semi-final.

Week 11: Both couples had to perform three dances: their favorite dance, judges's choice dance and a Freestyle. Joanna Moro received her 4th and 5th perfect scores for the Charleston and Freestyle. Aneta Zając received her 2nd and 3rd perfect scores for the Rumba and Freestyle. Aneta Zając got also 37 points for her Viennese Waltz, making it the lowest score of the week. Aneta & Stefano won the competition. This is the 8th time the winner was not on the first place according to the judges' scoreboard. In Season 11 Rafał Maserak and Stefano Terrazzino also danced in the finale. In Season 11 Rafał Maserak won the competition. Stefano Terrazzino won the competition for the third time since he won the 4th and 8th season with Kinga Rusin and Agata Kulesza. It was the fifth final for both Maserak and Terrazzino. Maserak won Season 10 with Anna Mucha and Season 11 with Julia Kamińska and took second place in the Season 2 with Małgorzata Foremniak and in Season 3 with Aleksandra Kwaśniewska. Terrazzino won Season 4 and Season 8 and took second place in the Season 6 with Justyna Steczkowska and in the Season 11 with Katarzyna Glinka.

== Average score chart ==
Rank by average	Place	Couple	Total points	Number of dances	Average
1	2	Joanna & Rafał	570	15	38.0
2	3	Dawid & Janja	431	12	35.9
3	4	Klaudia & Tomasz	357	10	35.7
4	1	Aneta & Stefano	492	15	32.8
5	6	Jacek & Magdalena	188	6	31.3
6	7	Rafał & Izabela	148	5	29.6
7	5	Piotr & Nina	229	8	28.6
8	12	Violetta & Krzysztof	27	1	27.0
9	8	Natalia & Jan	102	4	25.5
10	10	Antoni & Kamila	50	2	25.0
11	9	Karolina & Andrej	64	3	21.3
12	11	Jacek & Paulina	20	1	20.0

== Highest and lowest scoring performances ==
The best and worst performances in each dance according to the judges' 40-point scale are as follows:

Dance	Best dancer(s)	Highest score	Worst dancer(s)	Lowest score
Cha-cha-cha	Dawid Kwiatkowski	39	Natalia Siwiec	18
Waltz	Joanna Moro	37	Jacek Lenartowicz	20
Foxtrot	Dawid Kwiatkowski	39	Antoni Królikowski	28
Viennese Waltz	Aneta Zając	37	Aneta Zając	28
Jive	Dawid Kwiatkowski; Aneta Zając	33	Rafał Brzozowski	31
Tango	Joanna Moro	39	Natalia Siwiec	18
Quickstep	Joanna Moro	40	Aneta Zając	30
Samba	Klaudia Halejcio	40	Karolina Szostak	19
Rumba	Aneta Zając	40	Aneta Zając	28
Paso Doble	Joanna Moro	39	Piotr Gruszka	23
Salsa	Dawid Kwiatkowski	38	Jacek Rozenek	26
Argentine Tango	Aneta Zając	33	Dawid Kwiatkowski	32
Fusion	Joanna Moro; Dawid Kwiatkowski	40	Piotr Gruszka	31
Uncommon styles	Klaudia Halejcio (American Smooth); Joanna Moro (Charleston)	40	Piotr Gruszka (Swing)	29
Freestyle	Joanna Moro; Aneta Zając	40		

== Couples' highest and lowest scoring dances ==
According to the traditional 40-point scale:

Couples	Highest scoring dance(s)	Lowest scoring dance(s)
Aneta & Stefano	Rumba (twice), Freestyle (40)	Cha-cha-cha (26)
Joanna & Rafał	Fusion, Charleston (twice), Quickstep, Freestyle (40)	Waltz (32)
Dawid & Janja	Fusion (40)	Argentine Tango (32)
Klaudia & Tomasz	American Smooth, Samba (40)	Cha-cha-cha (29)
Piotr & Nina	Waltz (33)	Paso Doble (23)
Jacek & Magdalena	Rumba (37)	Cha-cha-cha, Salsa (26)
Rafał & Izabela	Quickstep (34)	Cha-cha-cha (24)
Natalia & Jan	Paso Doble (36)	Cha-cha-cha, Tango (18)
Karolina & Andrej	Tango (23)	Samba (19)
Antoni & Kamila	Foxtrot (28)	Cha-cha-cha (22)
Jacek & Paulina	Waltz (20)	Waltz (20)
Violetta & Krzysztof	Waltz (27)	Waltz (27)

== Weekly scores ==
Unless indicated otherwise, individual judges scores in the charts below (given in parentheses) are listed in this order from left to right: Andrzej Grabowski, Iwona Szymańska-Pavlović, Beata Tyszkiewicz and Michał Malitowski.

=== Week 1: Season Premiere ===
Running order

Couple	Score	Dance	Music	Result
Aneta & Stefano	26 (7,5,9,5)	Cha-cha-cha	"The Shoop Shoop Song (It's in His Kiss)"—Cher	Runner-up
Joanna & Rafał	32 (8,8,9,7)	Waltz	"Someday My Prince Will Come"—Adriana Caselotti	Winner
Klaudia & Tomasz	29 (8,7,9,5)	Cha-cha-cha	"Lady Marmalade"—Labelle	Safe
Karolina & Andrej	22 (6,4,8,4)	Waltz	"(You Make Me Feel Like) A Natural Woman"—Aretha Franklin	Bottom two
Violetta & Krzysztof	27 (7,5,9,6)	Waltz	"When I Need You"—Leo Sayer	Eliminated
Natalia & Jan	18 (6,3,5,4)	Cha-cha-cha	"Get Lucky"—Daft Punk featuring Pharrell Williams	Safe
Rafał & Izabela; Antoni & Kamila; Dawid & Janja; Piotr & Nina; Jacek R. & Magdalena; Jacek L. & Paulina	N/A	Group Swing	"This Will Be (An Everlasting Love)"—Natalie Cole	

=== Week 2 ===
Running order

Couple	Score	Dance	Music	Result
Piotr & Nina	25 (8,5,8,4)	Cha-cha-cha	"She Bangs"—Ricky Martin	Runner-up
Rafał & Izabela	28 (9,6,8,5)	Waltz	"Moon River"—Audrey Hepburn	Bottom two
Antoni & Kamila	22 (7,2,9,4)	Cha-cha-cha	"Moves like Jagger"—Maroon 5 featuring Christina Aguilera	Safe
Jacek & Paulina	20 (7,3,7,3)	Waltz	"Are You Lonesome Tonight?"—Elvis Presley	Eliminated
Dawid & Janja	35 (9,8,10,8)	Cha-cha-cha	"Sway"—Dean Martin	Winner
Jacek & Magdalena	34 (9,8,9,8)	Waltz	"What a Wonderful World"—Louis Armstrong	Safe
Joanna & Rafał; Aneta & Stefano; Klaudia & Tomasz; Natalia & Jan; Karolina & Andrej	N/A	Group Salsa	"Ran Kan Kan"—Tito Puente	

=== Week 3 ===
Running order

Couple	Score	Dance	Music	Result
Klaudia & Tomasz	36 (9,9,10,8)	Foxtrot	"Fever"—Peggy Lee	Safe
Jacek & Magdalena	26 (7,5,9,5)	Cha-cha-cha	"Mambo Italiano"—Rosemary Clooney	Safe
Aneta & Stefano	28 (8,6,8,6)	Viennese Waltz	"Over the Rainbow"—Judy Garland	Safe
Rafał & Izabela	31 (8,8,8,7)	Jive	"Happy"—Pharrell Williams	Safe
Natalia & Jan	18 (6,1,6,5)	Tango	"I've Seen That Face Before (Libertango)"—Grace Jones	Bottom two
Dawid & Janja	35 (10,7,10,8)	Quickstep	"Sing, Sing, Sing (With a Swing)"—Louis Prima	Runner-up
Karolina & Andrej	19 (6,2,6,5)	Samba	"Conga"—Miami Sound Machine	Safe
Piotr & Nina	33 (8,8,10,7)	Waltz	"Fascination"—Nat King Cole	Safe
Joanna & Rafał	39 (10,10,10,9)	Rumba	"You're Beautiful"—James Blunt	Winner
Antoni & Kamila	28 (8,6,8,6)	Foxtrot	"Theme from New York, New York"—Liza Minnelli	Eliminated

=== Week 4: Most Memorable Moments ===
Running order

Couple	Score	Dance	Music	Result
Karolina & Andrej	23 (8,2,8,5)	Tango	"The Phantom of the Opera"—Emmy Rossum and Gerard Butler	Eliminated
Piotr & Nina	31 (8,7,10,6)	Foxtrot	"Più bella cosa"—Eros Ramazzotti	Safe
Joanna & Rafał	34 (9,8,9,8)	Cha-cha-cha	"Blurred Lines"—Robin Thicke featuring T.I. and Pharrell Williams	Safe
Rafał & Izabela	31 (9,7,9,6)	Samba	"Tak blisko"—Rafał Brzozowski	Safe
Klaudia & Tomasz	35 (10,8,10,7)	Rumba	"Kolorowy wiatr"—Edyta Górniak	Safe
Aneta & Stefano	30 (9,5,9,7)	Quickstep	"You're the One That I Want"—John Travolta and Olivia Newton-John	Safe
Dawid & Janja	34 (8,9,10,7)	Rumba	"Price Tag"—Jessie J featuring B.o.B.	Safe
Natalia & Jan	36 (9,7,10,10)	Paso Doble	"Try"—Pink	Safe
Jacek & Magdalena	26 (8,4,8,6)	Salsa	"(I've Had) The Time of My Life"—Bill Medley and Jennifer Warnes	Last to be called safe

=== Week 5 ===
Running order

Couple	Score	Dance	Music	Result
Natalia & Jan	30 (9,5,9,7)	Waltz	"Smile"—Nat King Cole	Eliminated
Dawid & Janja	33 (8,7,10,8)	Jive	"The Boy Does Nothing"—Alesha Dixon	Safe
Klaudia & Tomasz	38 (10,9,10,9)	Tango	"Santa Maria (Del Buen Ayre)"—Gotan Project	Safe
Jacek & Magdalena	33 (9,7,9,8)	Foxtrot	"Fly Me to the Moon"—Frank Sinatra	Safe
Aneta & Stefano	40 (10,10,10,10)	Rumba	"Hello"—Lionel Richie	Safe
Piotr & Nina	23 (8,2,8,5)	Paso Doble	"Cancion del Mariachi"—Antonio Banderas	Last to be called safe
Joanna & Rafał	38 (10,9,10,9)	Foxtrot	"Dream a Little Dream of Me"—Mama Cass	Safe
Rafał & Izabela	34 (9,8,9,8)	Quickstep	"Crazy in Love"—Beyoncé featuring Jay-Z	Safe

=== Week 6: Love Week ===
Running order

Couple	Score	Dance	Music	Result
Aneta & Stefano; Piotr & Nina; Joanna & Rafał; Rafał & Izabela; Klaudia & Tomasz; Dawid & Janja; Jacek & Magdalena	N/A	Group; Viennese Waltz	"Can't Help Falling in Love"—Elvis Presley	
Dawid & Janja	36 (9,8,10,9)	Foxtrot	"Somethin' Stupid"—Frank Sinatra and Nancy Sinatra	Safe
Aneta & Stefano	27 (8,6,8,5)	Tango	"Rolling in the Deep"—Adele	Safe
Jacek & Magdalena	37 (10,8,10,9)	Rumba	"How Deep Is Your Love"—Bee Gees	Safe
Klaudia & Tomasz	32 (9,6,9,8)	Waltz	"I Will Always Love You"—Dolly Parton	Last to be called safe
Rafał & Izabela	24 (8,4,8,4)	Cha-cha-cha	"Bo jesteś Ty"—Krzysztof Krawczyk	Eliminated
Piotr & Nina	25 (7,5,9,4)	Tango	"Et si tu n'existais pas"—Joe Dassin	Safe
Joanna & Rafał	37 (10,10,10,7)	Paso Doble	"I'd Do Anything for Love (But I Won't Do That)"—Meat Loaf	Safe

=== Week 7: Dance Fusions ===
Running order

Couple	Score	Dance	Music	Result
Klaudia & Tomasz	38 (10,9,10,9)	Paso Doble; Tango	"Sweet Dreams (Are Made of This)"—Eurythmics	Last to be called safe
Piotr & Nina	31 (7,5,9,10)	Rumba; Foxtrot	"Careless Whisper"—George Michael	Safe
Joanna & Rafał	40 (10,10,10,10)	Tango; Cha-cha-cha	"Unchain My Heart"—Ray Charles	Safe
Jacek & Magdalena	32 (9,7,9,7)	Tango; Rumba	"Twist in My Sobriety"—Tanita Tikaram	Eliminated
Aneta & Stefano	35 (9,8,10,8)	Foxtrot; Cha-cha-cha	"It's Raining Men"—The Weather Girls	Safe
Dawid & Janja	40 (10,10,10,10)	Samba; Quickstep	"Stayin' Alive"—Bee Gees	Safe

=== Week 8 ===
Running order

Couple	Score	Dance	Music	Result
Aneta & Stefano	28 (8,5,8,7)	Rumba	"Out of Reach"—Gabrielle	Last to be called safe
Aneta & Stefano	33 (8,8,8,9)	Argentine Tango	"Speak Softly Love"—Andy Williams	Last to be called safe
Dawid & Janja	38 (10,9,10,9)	Salsa	"La vida es un carnaval"—Celia Cruz	Safe
Dawid & Janja	39 (10,10,10,9)	Foxtrot	"The Pink Panther Theme"—Henry Mancini	Safe
Klaudia & Tomasz	40 (10,10,10,10)	American Smooth	"Hallelujah"—Leonard Cohen	Safe
Klaudia & Tomasz	36 (10,8,9,9)	Cha-cha-cha	"September"—Earth, Wind & Fire	Safe
Piotr & Nina	29 (7,6,8,8)	Swing	"My Baby Just Cares for Me"—Nina Simone	Eliminated
Piotr & Nina	32 (8,7,9,8)	Waltz	"Imagine"—John Lennon	Eliminated
Joanna & Rafał	38 (10,9,10,9)	Rumba	"Why"—Annie Lennox	Safe
Joanna & Rafał	40 (10,10,10,10)	Charleston	"Cabaret"—Liza Minnelli	Safe

=== Week 9: Divas Week ===
Running order

Couple	Score	Dance	Music	Result
Joanna & Rafał	37 (9,9,10,9)	Waltz	"To nie ja!"—Edyta Górniak	Safe
Joanna & Rafał	37 (10,10,10,7)	Samba	"Single Ladies (Put a Ring on It)"—Beyoncé	Safe
Aneta & Stefano	31 (9,7,9,6)	Quickstep	"Milord"—Édith Piaf	Safe
Aneta & Stefano	33 (9,7,9,8)	Paso Doble	"Lucciola"—Maanam	Safe
Dawid & Janja	39 (9,10,10,10)	Cha-cha-cha	"Małgośka"—Maryla Rodowicz	Last to be called safe
Dawid & Janja	32 (9,4,10,9)	Argentine Tango	"GoldenEye"—Tina Turner	Last to be called safe
Klaudia & Tomasz	33 (9,8,9,7)	Foxtrot	"Supermenka"—Kayah	Eliminated
Klaudia & Tomasz	40 (10,10,10,10)	Samba	"La Isla Bonita"—Madonna	Eliminated

=== Week 10: Hollywood Week (Semi-final) ===
Running order

Couple	Score	Dance	Music	Movie	Result
Aneta & Stefano	31 (8,7,8,8)	Foxtrot	"Singin' in the Rain"—Gene Kelly	Singin' in the Rain	Safe
Aneta & Stefano	33 (8,8,8,9)	Jive	"Footloose"—Kenny Loggins	Footloose	Safe
Dawid & Janja	37 (10,8,10,9)	Samba	"Dancing Queen"—ABBA	Mamma Mia!	Eliminated
Dawid & Janja	33 (8,7,10,8)	Waltz	"My Heart Will Go On"—Celine Dion	Titanic	Eliminated
Joanna & Rafał	39 (10,10,10,9)	Paso Doble	"Be Italian"—Fergie	Nine	Safe
Joanna & Rafał	40 (10,10,10,10)	Quickstep	"Diamonds Are a Girl's Best Friend"—Marilyn Monroe	Gentlemen Prefer Blondes	Safe

=== Week 11: Season Finale ===
Running order

Couple	Score	Dance	Music	Result
Joanna & Rafał	39 (10,10,10,9)	Tango (Note: In the judges' pick round Joanna & Rafał repeated their Argentine Tango/Cha-cha-cha fusion from week 7, with Cha-cha-cha sections replaced with ballroom Tango sections.)	"Unchain My Heart"—Ray Charles	Runner-up
Joanna & Rafał	40 (10,10,10,10)	Charleston	"Cabaret"—Liza Minnelli	Runner-up
Joanna & Rafał	40 (10,10,10,10)	Freestyle	"Someone like You"—Adele	Runner-up
Aneta & Stefano	37 (10,8,10,9)	Viennese Waltz	"Over the Rainbow"—Judy Garland	Winner
Aneta & Stefano	40 (10,10,10,10)	Rumba	"Hello"—Lionel Richie	Winner
Aneta & Stefano	40 (10,10,10,10)	Freestyle	"Say Something"—A Great Big World ft. Christina Aguilera	Winner

== Dance chart ==
The celebrities and professional partners danced one of these routines for each corresponding week:

- Week 1 (Season Premiere): Cha-cha-cha or Waltz (women) and a group Swing (men)
- Week 2: Cha-cha-cha or Waltz (men) and a group Salsa (women)
- Week 3 (Personal Story Night): One unlearned dance (introducing Quickstep, Rumba, Jive, Tango, Foxtrot, Samba, Viennese Waltz)
- Week 4: One unlearned dance (introducing Paso Doble)
- Week 5: One unlearned dance
- Week 6 (Love Night): One unlearned dance and a group dance Viennese Waltz
- Week 7 (Dance Fusion Night): One dance consisting of two different styles
- Week 8: One unlearned uncommon dance and one repeated dance
- Week 9 (Divas Night): One repeated dance and one unlearned dance
- Week 10 (Semi-final: Hollywood Night): One unlearned dance and one repeated dance
- Week 11 (Season Finale): Judges' choice, couple's favorite dance of the season and Freestyle

Couple	1	2	3	4	5	6		7	8		9		10		11		
Aneta & Stefano	Cha-cha-cha	Salsa	Viennese Waltz	Quickstep	Rumba	Viennese Waltz	Tango	Foxtrot; Cha-cha-cha	Rumba	Argentine Tango	Quickstep	Paso Doble	Foxtrot	Jive	Viennese Waltz	Rumba	Freestyle
Joanna & Rafał	Waltz	Salsa	Rumba	Cha-cha-cha	Foxtrot	Viennese Waltz	Paso Doble	Tango; Cha-cha-cha	Rumba	Charleston	Waltz	Samba	Paso Doble	Quickstep	Tango	Charleston	Freestyle
Dawid & Janja	Swing	Cha-cha-cha	Quickstep	Rumba	Jive	Viennese Waltz	Foxtrot	Samba; Quickstep	Salsa	Foxtrot	Cha-cha-cha	Argentine Tango	Samba	Waltz			Swing
Klaudia & Tomasz	Cha-cha-cha	Salsa	Foxtrot	Rumba	Tango	Viennese Waltz	Waltz	Paso Doble; Tango	American Smooth	Cha-cha-cha	Foxtrot	Samba					Salsa
Piotr & Nina	Swing	Cha-cha-cha	Waltz	Foxtrot	Paso Doble	Viennese Waltz	Tango	Rumba; Foxtrot	Swing	Waltz							Swing
Jacek & Magdalena	Swing	Waltz	Cha-cha-cha	Salsa	Foxtrot	Viennese Waltz	Rumba	Tango; Rumba									Swing
Rafał & Izabela	Swing	Waltz	Jive	Samba	Quickstep	Viennese Waltz	Cha-cha-cha										Swing
Natalia & Jan	Cha-cha-cha	Salsa	Tango	Paso Doble	Waltz												Salsa
Karolina & Andrej	Waltz	Salsa	Samba	Tango													Salsa
Antoni & Kamila	Swing	Cha-cha-cha	Foxtrot														Swing
Jacek & Paulina	Swing	Waltz															Swing
Violetta & Krzysztof	Waltz																Salsa

Highest scoring dance
Lowest scoring dance
Performed, but not scored

== Call-out order ==
The order in the first three weeks was based on judges' scores combined with viewers' votes. The order from week 4 onwards was random.

Order	Week 1	Week 2	Week 3	Week 4	Week 5	Week 6	Week 7	Week 8	Week 9	Week 10	Week 11
1	Joanna & Rafał	Dawid & Janja	Joanna & Rafał	Klaudia & Tomasz	Aneta & Stefano	Jacek & Magdalena	Dawid & Janja	Joanna & Rafał	Joanna & Rafał	Joanna & Rafał	Aneta & Stefano
2	Aneta & Stefano	Piotr & Nina	Dawid & Janja	Piotr & Nina	Klaudia & Tomasz	Aneta & Stefano	Joanna & Rafał	Klaudia & Tomasz	Aneta & Stefano	Aneta & Stefano	Joanna & Rafał
3	Klaudia & Tomasz	Jacek & Magdalena	Piotr & Nina	Joanna & Rafał	Dawid & Janja	Dawid & Janja	Aneta & Stefano	Dawid & Janja	Dawid & Janja	Dawid & Janja	
4	Natalia & Jan	Antoni & Kamila	Aneta & Stefano	Natalia & Jan	Jacek & Magdalena	Piotr & Nina	Piotr & Nina	Aneta & Stefano	Klaudia & Tomasz		
5	Karolina & Andrej	Rafał & Izabela	Rafał & Izabela	Rafał & Izabela	Joanna & Rafał	Joanna & Rafał	Klaudia & Tomasz	Piotr & Nina			
6	Violetta & Krzysztof	Jacek & Paulina	Klaudia & Tomasz	Dawid & Janja	Rafał & Izabela	Klaudia & Tomasz	Jacek & Magdalena				
7			Karolina & Andrej	Aneta & Stefano	Piotr & Nina	Rafał & Izabela					
8			Jacek & Magdalena	Jacek & Magdalena	Natalia & Jan						
9			Natalia & Jan	Karolina & Andrej							
10			Antoni & Kamila								

This couple came in first place with the judges.
This couple came in last place with the judges.
This couple came in last place with the judges and was eliminated.
This couple was eliminated.
This couple won the competition.
This couple came in second in the competition.
This couple came in third in the competition.

== Guest performances ==
Date	Artist(s)	Song(s)	Dancers
7 March 2014	Tomasz Szymuś's Orchestra	"Don't Stop The Music"	All professional dancers, Michał Malitowski, Iwona Pavlović, Andrzej Grabowski and Beata Tyszkiewicz
7 March 2014	Tomasz Szymuś's Orchestra	"Bésame Mucho" "Guantanamera"	Michał Malitowski and Joanna Leunis
7 March 2014	Dawid Kwiatkowski	"Celebration"	All couples
14 March 2014	Kim Cesarion	"Undressed"	VOLT dance group
14 March 2014	Marcin Wyrostek	"El Tango de Roxanne"	Anna Głogowska, Tomasz Barański, Jan Kliment
14 March 2014	Rafał Brzozowski	"Za mały świat"	—
28 March 2014	Katie Melua	"Nine Million Bicycles"	VOLT dance group
4 April 2014	Bracia	"Po drugiej stronie chmur"	—
4 April 2014	Stefano Terrazzino	"Volare"	—
11 April 2014	Alicja Węgorzewska	"Perche"	balet
11 April 2014	Bilguun Ariunbaatar	"Sex Bomb"	—
25 April 2014	Margaret	"Wasted" "Thank You Very Much"	VOLT dance group
25 April 2014	Artur Chamski	"Baby"	girls with VOLT dance group
2 May 2014	Katarzyna Skrzynecka	"Private Dancer"	VOLT dance group
9 May 2014	Beata Kozidrak & Bajm	"Co mi Panie dasz?"	—
16 May 2014	Urszula & Michał Rudaś	"Baw mnie"	VOLT dance group
16 May 2014	Tomasz Szymuś's Orchestra	"You Never Can Tell"	Anna Głogowska and Krzysztof Ibisz
16 May 2014	Tomasz Szymuś's Orchestra	"Matrix"	Anna Głogowska and Jan Kliment
16 May 2014	Michał Kwiatkowski	"I Don't Want to Miss a Thing"	—
23 May 2014	Tomasz Szymuś's Orchestra	"I'm Every Woman"	All professional dancers
23 May 2014	Tomasz Szymuś's Orchestra	"Bring Me to Life"	Iwona Pavlović with Tomasz Barański, Krzysztof Hulboj, Jan Kliment and Andrej Mosejcuk
23 May 2014	Anna Wyszkoni	"Ran Kan Kan"	Violetta Arlak & Krzysztof Hulboj, Karolina Szostak & Andrej Mosejcuk, Natalia Siwiec & Jan Kliment and Klaudia Halejcio & Tomasz Barański
23 May 2014	Andrzej Piaseczny	"This Will Be (An Everlasting Love)"	All male participants with their partners
23 May 2014	Maryla Rodowicz	"Conga"	All couples except for finalists

== Rating figures ==
Date	Episode	Official rating 4+	Share 4+	Official rating 16–49	Share 16–49
7 March 2014	1	3 819 856	24.08%	1 436 086	23.15%
14 March 2014	2	3 552 522	22.74%	1 177 475	19.12%
21 March 2014	3	3 722 358	23.42%	1 263 441	19.56%
28 March 2014	4	4 090 934	26.28%	1 283 984	21.15%
4 April 2014	5	3 728 753	24.00%	1 189 231	19.04%
11 April 2014	6	3 516 767	23.38%	1 067 816	18.53%
25 April 2014	7	3 120 514	21.16%	—N/a	—N/a
2 May 2014	8	3 278 548	21.86%	—N/a	—N/a
9 May 2014	9	3 336 610	23.47%	—N/a	—N/a
16 May 2014	10	3 696 914	23.97%	1 091 720	17.93%
23 May 2014	11	3 538 174	27.40%	1 014 833	20.64%
Average	Spring 2014	3 581 995	23.79%	—N/a	18.79%
