= Jak oni śpiewają season 3 =

Jak oni śpiewają
- Season 3
- Hosted by: Katarzyna Cichopek; Krzysztof Ibisz
- Judges: Edyta Górniak; Rudi Schuberth; Elżbieta Zapendowska
- Winner: Krzysztof Respondek
- Runner-up: Joanna Jabłczyńska

Release
- Original network: Polsat
- Original release: March 8 – May 31, 2008

Season chronology
- ← Previous; Season 2 Next → Season 4

The 3rd season of Jak oni śpiewają, the Polish edition of Soapstar Superstar, started on March 8, 2008 and ended on May 31, 2008. It was broadcast by Polsat. Katarzyna Cichopek and Krzysztof Ibisz as the hosts, and the judges were: Edyta Górniak, Elżbieta Zapendowska and Rudi Schuberth.

== Stars ==
Celebrity	Character	Soap	Status
Joanna Kurowska	Jadźka Graczyk	"Graczykowie" Polsat	Eliminated 1st on March 15, 2008
Tomasz Bednarek	Jacek Borecki	"Klan" TVP1	Eliminated 2nd on March 22, 2008
Anna Janocha	Julia Porębska	"M jak miłość" TVP2	Eliminated 3rd on March 29, 2008
Wojciech Medyński	Michał	"M jak miłość" TVP2	Eliminated 4th on April 5, 2008
Michał Koterski	Słoniu	"Królowie śródmieścia" TVP1	Withdrew on April 12, 2008
Monika Dryl	Grażyna	"Faceci do wzięcia" TVP1	Eliminated 6th on April 19, 2008
Dariusz Kordek	Edward Lachnal	"Fałszerze - Powrót Sfory" TVP2	Eliminated 7th on April 26, 2008
Grażyna Szapołowska	Julia Szulc	"Magda M." TVN	Eliminated 8th on May 3, 2008
Aneta Zając	Marysia Radosz	"Pierwsza miłość Polsat	Eliminated 9th on May 10, 2008
Olga Bończyk	Edyta Kuszyńska	"Na dobre i na złe" TVP2	Eliminated 10th on May 17, 2008
Kacper Kuszewski	Marek Mostowiak	"M jak miłość" TVP2	Third Place on May 31, 2008
Joanna Jabłczyńska	Marta Konarska	"Na Wspólnej" TVN	Second Place on May 31, 2008
Krzysztof Respondek	Michał Jeleń	"Barwy szczęścia" TVP2	Winners on May 31, 2008

== Guest Performances ==
Episode	Date	Artist(s)	Song(s)
10	May 10, 2008	Garou	"Gitan"
10	May 10, 2008	Garou	"Stand Up"
13	May 31, 2008	Piotr Polk	"What a Wonderful World"

== Scores ==
Couple	Place	1	2	3	4	5	6	7	8	9	10	11	12	13
Krzysztof Respondek	1	5.2	6.0	6.0	5.0	5.9	4.8	6.0	5.6+6.0=11.6	5.3+6.0=11.3	5.8+6.0=11.8	6.0+5.5+5.9=17.4	6.0+6.0=12.0	6.0+6.0+6.0+6.0=24.0
Joanna Jabłczyńska	2	4.3	5.7	5.9	5.8	6.0	5.3	5.8	5.5+5.9=11.4	5.8+5.5=11.3	5.5+6.0=11.5	5.3+5.8+5.5=16.6	6.0+6.0=12.0	6.0+6.0+6.0+6.0=24.0
Kacper Kuszewski	3	4.3	5.6	5.8	5.4	5.8	5.3	5.9	5.5+5.8=11.3	5.5+5.8=11.3	5.8+5.6=11.4	5.9+5.4+6.0=17.3	6.0+6.0=12.0	6.0
Olga Bończyk	4	4.7	6.0	6.0	4.5	5.8	5.8	5.8	5.4+6.0=11.4	5.5+5.9=11.4	6.0+6.0=12.0			
Aneta Zając	5	3.3	5.0	5.4	4.6	4.3	4.8	5.3	5.3+4.0=9.3	4.3+4.8=9.1	4.3			
Grażyna Szapołowska	6	5.7	5.1	5.8	5.8	5.9	5.9	5.9	4.8+5.3=10.1	5.0				
Dariusz Kordek	7	3.7	5.0	5.3	5.5	5.8	6.0	5.5	4.2					
Monika Dryl	8	5.7	5.8	5.9	4.5	5.9	5.9	5.7						
Michał Koterski	9	4.3	5.4	4.8	4.0	5.5								
Wojciech Medyński	10	5.0	5.6	4.8	5.0									
Anna Janocha	11	2.7	4.6	5.0										
Tomasz Bednarek	12	3.3	5.5											
Joanna Kurowska	13	4.3												

Red numbers indicate the lowest score for each week.
Green numbers indicate the highest score for each week.
indicates the star eliminated that week.
indicates the returning stars that finished in the bottom two.
indicates the star who has got immunitet
indicates the star withdrew.

=== Average Chart ===
Place	Star	Average	Total	Best Score	Worst Score	Number of songs
1.	Krzysztof Respondek	5.77	127	6.0	4.8	22
2.	Joanna Jabłczyńska	5.70	124.6	6.0	4.3	22
3.	Kacper Kuszewski	5.66	107.5	6.0	4.3	19
4.	Olga Bończyk	5.65	73.4	6.0	4.5	13
5.	Monika Dryl	5.62	39.4	5.9	4.5	7
6.	Grażyna Szapołowska	5.52	50.2	5.9	4.8	10
7.	Dariusz Kordek	5.125	41	6.0	3.7	8
8.	Wojciech Medyński	5.10	20.4	5.6	4.8	4
9.	Michał Koterski	4.80	24	5.5	4.0	5
10.	Aneta Zając	4.63	51.3	5.4	4.3	12
11.	Tomasz Bednarek	4.40	8.8	5.5	3.3	2
12.	Joanna Kurowska	4.30	4.3	4.3	4.3	1
13.	Anna Janocha	4.10	12.3	5.0	2.7	3
Everystar		5.44	674.3	6.0	2.7	124

Judge/Episode	1	2	3	4	5	6	7	8	9	10	11	12	13	Average
Edyta Górniak	4.0	5.3	5.6	4.7	5.4	5.3	5.9	5.5	5.3	5.8	5.8	6.0	6.0	5.4
Rudi Schuberth	5.0	5.5	5.5	5.5	5.9	5.8	6.0	5.9	5.6	5.9	6.0	6.0	6.0	5.7
Elżbieta Zapendowska	4.1	4.5	5.0	3.8	5.2	5.4	5.1	4.8	5.0	5.8	5.4	6.0	6.0	5.1

==== The Best Score (6.0) ====
No	Star	Song	Episode	6.0
1	Kacper Kuszewski	Time to say goodbye	11	4
1	Kacper Kuszewski	Z tobą chcę oglądać świat	12	4
1	Kacper Kuszewski	Tajemnice mundialu	12	4
1	Kacper Kuszewski	New York, New York	13	4
2	Olga Bończyk	Orła cień	2	5
2	Olga Bończyk	To nie ja byłam Ewą	3	5
2	Olga Bończyk	All by myself	8	5
2	Olga Bończyk	Serca gwiazd	10	5
2	Olga Bończyk	Zatańczysz ze mną jeszcze raz	10	5
7	Dariusz Kordek	Mój przyjacielu	6	1
8	Joanna Jabłczyńska	It's raining man	5	8
8	Joanna Jabłczyńska	Odpływają kawiarenki	10	8
8	Joanna Jabłczyńska	Radość najpiękniejszych	12	8
8	Joanna Jabłczyńska	Football	12	8
8	Joanna Jabłczyńska	Sway	13	8
8	Joanna Jabłczyńska	Zawsze tam, gdzie ty	13	8
8	Joanna Jabłczyńska	Wyginam śmiało ciało	13	8
8	Joanna Jabłczyńska	Piechotą do lata	13	8
9	Krzysztof Respondek	Whisky	2	13
9	Krzysztof Respondek	Szczęśliwej drogi już czas	3	13
9	Krzysztof Respondek	Baila	7	13
9	Krzysztof Respondek	Mój jest ten kawałek podłogi	8	13
9	Krzysztof Respondek	Oh, Carol	9	13
9	Krzysztof Respondek	Pamiętam ciebie z tamtych lat'	10	13
9	Krzysztof Respondek	La dance des canards	11	13
9	Krzysztof Respondek	Naiwne pytania	12	13
9	Krzysztof Respondek	Do boju, Polsko	12	13
9	Krzysztof Respondek	Nie mogę ci wiele dać	13	13
9	Krzysztof Respondek	Kryzysowa narzeczona	13	13
9	Krzysztof Respondek	Hakuna matata	13	13
9	Krzysztof Respondek	Wakacje z blondynką	13	13

== Episodes ==
=== Week 1 ===
Individual judges scores in charts below (given in parentheses) are listed in this order from left to right: Edyta Górniak, Elżbieta Zapendowska, Rudi Schuberth.

Running order

Star	Score	Song
Kacper Kuszewski	4.3 (4,5,4)	Barry Manilow - "Copacabana"
Olga Bończyk	4.7 (4,5,5)	Kayah & Bregović - "Prawy do lewego"
Tomasz Bednarek	3.3 (2,5,3)	Bee Gees - "Stayin' Alive"
Aneta Zając	3.5 (3,4,3.5)	Virgin - "Dżaga"
Joanna Kurowska	4.3 (4,5,4)	Olga Szomańska & Przemysław Branny - "Niech mówią, że to nie jest miłość"
Anna Janocha	2.7 (2,4,2)	Maria Koterbska - "Serduszko puka w rytmie cha-cha"
Dariusz Kordek	3.7 (4,4,3)	Stachursky - "Typ niepokorny"
Joanna Jabłczyńska	4.3 (4,5,4)	The Pointer Sisters - "I'm So Excited"
Krzysztof Respondek	5.2 (6,5,4.5)	Kukiz i Piersi - "O Hela"
Monika Dryl	5.7 (5,6,6)	Bajm - "Płynie w nas gorąca krew"
Wojciech Medyński	5.0 (5,6,4)	Ricky Martin - "María"
Grażyna Szapołowska	5.7 (5,6,6)	Violetta Villas - "Oczy czarne"
Michał Koterski	4.3 (3.5,5,4.5)	Ivan Mladek - "Jožin z bažin"

=== Week 2 ===
Individual judges scores in charts below (given in parentheses) are listed in this order from left to right: Edyta Górniak, Elżbieta Zapendowska, Rudi Schuberth, Joanna Zając, Joanna Kurowska

Running order

Star	Score	Song
Kacper Kuszewski	5.6 (6,6,4,6,6)	Kukiz i Piersi - "Całuj mnie"
Olga Bończyk	6.0 (6,6,6,6,6)	Varius Manx - "Orła cień"
Tomasz Bednarek	5.5 (6,5,4.5,6,6)	Feel - "A gdy jest już ciemno"
Aneta Zając	5.0 (4,5,4,6,6)	Blue Café - "Do nieba, do piekła"
Anna Janocha	4.6 (3,5,3,6,6)	Happy End - "Jak się masz kochanie"
Dariusz Kordek	5.0 (4,5,4,6,6)	Perfect - "Kołysanka dla nieznajomej"
Joanna Jabłczyńska	5.7 (6,6,4.5,6,6)	Brathanki - "Czerwone korale"
Krzysztof Respondek	6.0 (6,6,6,6,6)	Dżem - "Whisky"
Monika Dryl	5.8 (6,6,5,6,6)	Maryla Rodowicz - "Małgośka"
Wojciech Medyński	5.6 (6,5,5,6,6)	Golec uOrkiestra - "Ściernisko"
Grażyna Szapołowska	5.1 (4,5,4.5,6,6)	Alicja Majewska - "Jeszcze się tam żagiel bieli"
Michał Koterski	5.4 (6,6,3,6,6)	Zbigniew Wodecki - "Chałupy welcome to"

=== Week 3 ===
Individual judges scores in charts below (given in parentheses) are listed in this order from left to right: Edyta Górniak, Elżbieta Zapendowska, Rudi Schuberth, Tomasz Bednarek

Running order

Star	Score	Song
Grażyna Szapołowska	5.8 (6,6,5,6)	Marek Grechuta - "Nie dokazuj"
Joanna Jabłczyńska	5.9 (6,6,5.5,6)	Boys Town Gang - "Can't Take My Eyes Off You"
Krzysztof Respondek	6.0 (6,6,6,6,6)	VOX - "Szczęśliwej drogi już czas"
Monika Dryl	5.9 (6,6,5.5,6)	Tina Turner - "What's Love, Got To Do With It"
Kacper Kuszewski	5.8 (6,6,5,6)	Lady Pank - "Zawsze tam gdzie ty"
Anna Janocha	5.0 (5,5,4,6)	Baccara - "Yes Sir, I Can Boogie"
Olga Bończyk	6.0 (6,6,6,6,6)	Edyta Górniak - "To nie ja!"
Wojciech Medyński	4.8 (5,5,4,5)	Maroon 5 - "This Love"
Aneta Zając	5.4 (6,5,4.5,6)	Bananarama - "Venus"
Dariusz Kordek	5.3 (5,5,5,6)	Seweryn Krajewski - "Wielka miłość"
Michał Koterski	4.8 (5,5,4,5)	Laskovyi Mai - "Belye Rozy"

=== Week 4 ===
Individual judges scores in charts below (given in parentheses) are listed in this order from left to right: Edyta Górniak, Elżbieta Zapendowska, Rudi Schuberth, Anna Janocha

Running order

Star	Score	Song
Kacper Kuszewski	5.4 (5,6,4.5,6)	A-Ha - "Take On Me"
Olga Bończyk	4.5 (3,5,4,6)	Jennifer Lopez - "Let's Get Loud"
Aneta Zając	4.6 (5,5,2.5,6)	P!nk - "Just Like A Pill"
Dariusz Kordek	5.5 (6,6,4,6)	Rod Stewart - "Sailing"
Joanna Jabłczyńska	5.8 (6,6,5,6)	Katarzyna Sobczyk - "O mnie się nie martw"
Krzysztof Respondek	5.0 (4,5,5,6)	Lady Pank - "Tańcz, głupia, tańcz"
Monika Dryl	4.5 (4,5,3,6)	Cher - "Believe"
Wojciech Medyński	5.0 (5,5,4,6)	Szymon Wydra & Carpe Diem - "Teraz wiem"
Grażyna Szapołowska	5.8 (6,6,5,6)	Bayer Full - "Hej sokoły"
Michał Koterski	4.0 (3,6,1,6)	Püdelsi - "Uważaj na niego"

=== Week 5 ===
Individual judges scores in charts below (given in parentheses) are listed in this order from left to right: Edyta Górniak, Elżbieta Zapendowska, Rudi Schuberth, Wojciech Medyński

Running order

Star	Score	Song
Kacper Kuszewski	5.8 (6,6,5,6)	Enrique Iglesias - "Bailamos"
Olga Bończyk	5.8 (5,6,6,6)	Bajm - "Ta sama chwila"
Aneta Zając	4.3 (3,5,3,6)	ABBA - "Waterloo"
Dariusz Kordek	5.8 (5,6,6,6)	Kombi - "Słodkiego, miłego życia"
Joanna Jabłczyńska	6.0 (6,6,6,6)	Geri Halliwell - "It's Raining Men"
Krzysztof Respondek	5.9 (6,6,5.5,6)	Scorpions - "Wind Of Change"
Monika Dryl	5.9 (6,6,5.5,6)	Czesław Niemen - "Dziwny jest ten świat"
Grażyna Szapołowska	5.9 (6,6,5.5,6)	Budka Suflera - "Takie tango"
Michał Koterski	5.5 (6,6,4,6)	Janusz Laskowski - "Beata z Albatrosa"

=== Week 6 ===
Individual judges scores in charts below (given in parentheses) are listed in this order from left to right: Edyta Górniak, Elżbieta Zapendowska, Rudi Schuberth, Michał Koterski

Running order

Star	Score	Song
Kacper Kuszewski	5.3 (5,5,5,6)	Shakin' Stevens - "Cry Just A Little Bit"
Olga Bończyk	5.8 (5,6,6,6)	Anna Jantar - "Tylko mnie poproś do tańca"
Aneta Zając	4.8 (4,5,4,6)	Bum - "Kanikuły"
Dariusz Kordek	6.0 (6,6,6,6)	Krzysztof Krawczyk & Bregović - "Mój przyjacielu"
Joanna Jabłczyńska	5.3 (4,6,5,6)	Urszula - "Dmuchawce, latawce, wiatr"
Krzysztof Respondek	4.8 (6,6,6,1)	Borysewicz & Kukiz - "Bo tutaj jest jak jest"
Monika Dryl	5.9 (6,6,5.5,6)	Europe - "The Final Countdown"
Grażyna Szapołowska	5.9 (6,6,5.5,6)	Hanka Ordonówna - "Miłość ci wszystko wybaczy"
Michał Koterski	-	Andrzej Dąbrowski - "Do zakochania jeden krok"

=== Week 7 ===
Individual judges scores in charts below (given in parentheses) are listed in this order from left to right: Edyta Górniak, Elżbieta Zapendowska, Rudi Schuberth

Running order

Star	Score	Song
Monika Dryl duet with Conrado Moreno	5.7 (6,6,5)	Carlos Santana - "Corazón espinado"
Aneta Zając duet with Mikołaj Krawczyk	5.3 (6,6,4)	Joan Jett - "I Love Rock 'n' Roll"

Individual judges scores in charts below (given in parentheses) are listed in this order from left to right: Edyta Górniak, Elżbieta Zapendowska, Rudi Schuberth, Monika Dryl

Running order

Star	Score	Song
Kacper Kuszewski duet with Jolanta Fraszyńska	5.9 (6,6,5.5,6)	Andrzej Rosiewicz - "Czy czuje pani cha-chę"
Olga Bończyk duet with Robert Rozmus	5.8 (6,6,5,6)	Krzysztof Kiljański & Kayah - "Prócz ciebie nic"
Dariusz Kordek duet with Agnieszka Popielewicz	5.5 (5,6,5,6)	Al Bano & Romina Power - "Felicita"
Joanna Jabłczyńska duet with Jadzia Nalepa	5.8 (6,6,5,6)	Alicja Majewska - "Być kobietą"
Krzysztof Respondek duet with Maciej Dowbor	6.0 (6,6,6,6)	Zucchero - "Baila"
Grażyna Szapołowska duet with Dżiani	5.9 (6,6,5.5,6)	Krzysztof Krawczyk - "My cyganie"

=== Week 8 ===
Individual judges scores in charts below (given in parentheses) are listed in this order from left to right: Edyta Górniak, Elżbieta Zapendowska, Rudi Schuberth

Running order

Star	Score	Song
Dariusz Kordek	4.2 (4,5,3.5)	Boys - "Jesteś szalona"
Grażyna Szapołowska	4.8 (5,6,3.5)	Bolter - "Daj mi tę noc"

Individual judges scores in charts below (given in parentheses) are listed in this order from left to right: Edyta Górniak, Elżbieta Zapendowska, Rudi Schuberth, Dariusz Kordek

Running order

Star	Score	Song
Kacper Kuszewski	5.5 (6,6,4,6)	Papa Dance - "Naj story"
Kacper Kuszewski	5.8 (6,6,6,5)	Billy Joel - "Uptown Girl"
Olga Bończyk	5.4 (5,6,4.5,6)	Ich Troje - "Powiedz"
Olga Bończyk	6.0 (6,6,6,6)	Celine Dion - "All By Myself"
Aneta Zając	5.3 (6,6,3,6)	Janusz Laskowski & Fanatic - "Czarownica"
Aneta Zając	4.0 (3,5,3,5)	Reni Jusis - "Zakręcona"
Joanna Jabłczyńska	5.5 (6,6,4,6)	Ivan & Delfin - "Jej czarne oczy"
Joanna Jabłczyńska	5.9 (6,6,5.5,6)	Rihanna - "Umbrella"
Krzysztof Respondek	5.6 (6,6,4.5,6)	"Biały miś"
Krzysztof Respondek	6.0 (6,6,6,6)	Mr. Zoob - "Mój jest ten kawałek podłogi"
Grażyna Szapołowska	5.3 (5,6,4,6)	Seweryn Krajewski - "Uciekaj moje serce"

=== Week 9 ===
Individual judges scores in charts below (given in parentheses) are listed in this order from left to right: Edyta Górniak, Elżbieta Zapendowska, Rudi Schuberth

Running order

Star	Score	Song
Aneta Zając	4.3 (5,5,3)	Anna Jantar - "Jambalaya"
Grażyna Szapołowska	5.0 (5,6,4)	Marek Grechuta - "Wiosna - ach to ty"

Individual judges scores in charts below (given in parentheses) are listed in this order from left to right: Edyta Górniak, Elżbieta Zapendowska, Rudi Schuberth, Grażyna Szapołowska

Running order

Star	Score	Song
Kacper Kuszewski	5.5 (6,5,5,6)	Marlena Drozdowska & Group "I" - "Radość o poranku"
Kacper Kuszewski	5.8 (5,6,6,6)	Myslovitz - "Scenariusz dla moich sąsiadów"
Olga Bończyk	5.5 (5,6,5,6)	Anna Jantar - "Tyle słońca w całym mieście"
Olga Bończyk	5.9 (6,6,5.5,6)	Bonnie Tyler - "Holding Out for a Hero"
Aneta Zając	4.8 (4,5,4,6)	Yugoton & Paweł Kukiz - "O nic nie pytaj (bo nie pytam ja)"
Joanna Jabłczyńska	5.8 (6,6,5,6)	Zofia Kucówna & Kabaret Starszych Panów - "Kaziu, zakochaj się"
Joanna Jabłczyńska	5.5 (5,6,5,6)	Katrina & The Waves - "I'm Walking On Sunshine"
Krzysztof Respondek	5.3 (5,5,5,6)	Skaldowie - "Wszystko mi mówi, że mnie ktoś pokochał"
Krzysztof Respondek	6.0 (6,6,6,6)	Neil Sedaka - "Oh! Carol"

=== Week 10 ===
Individual judges scores in charts below (given in parentheses) are listed in this order from left to right: Edyta Górniak, Elżbieta Zapendowska, Rudi Schuberth

Running order

Star	Score	Song
Aneta Zając	4.3 (4,5,4)	Ottawan - "Hands Up"
Kacper Kuszewski	5.5	Wham! - "Careless Whisper"

Individual judges scores in charts below (given in parentheses) are listed in this order from left to right: Edyta Górniak, Elżbieta Zapendowska, Rudi Schuberth, Aneta Zając

Running order

Star	Score	Song
Kacper Kuszewski	6.0 (6,6,6,6)	Krzysztof Krawczyk - "Parostatek"
Olga Bończyk	6.0 (6,6,6,6)	Halina Frąckowiak - "Serca gwiazd"
Olga Bończyk	6.0 (6,6,6,6)	Krzysztof Krawczyk - "Zatańczysz ze mną jeszcze raz"
Joanna Jabłczyńska	5.5 (5,6,5,6)	Krzysztof Krawczyk - "Za Tobą pójdę jak na bal"
Joanna Jabłczyńska	6.0 (6,6,6,6)	Irena Jarocka - "Odpływają kawiarenki"
Krzysztof Respondek	5.8 (5,6,6,6)	Bon Jovi - "It's My Life"
Krzysztof Respondek	6.0 (6,6,6,6)	Krzysztof Krawczyk - "Pamiętam ciebie z tamtych lat (Wróć do mnie)"

=== Week 11 ===
Individual judges scores in charts below (given in parentheses) are listed in this order from left to right: Edyta Górniak, Elżbieta Zapendowska, Rudi Schuberth, Olga Bończyk

Running order

Star	Score	Song
Kacper Kuszewski	5.9 (6,6,5.5,6)	Los Del Rio - "Macarena"
Kacper Kuszewski	5.4 (5,6,4.5,6)	Madonna - "La Isla Bonita"
Kacper Kuszewski	6.0 (6,6,6,6)	Andrea Bocelli - "Time to Say Goodbye" duet with Aleksandra Chadzińska
Joanna Jabłczyńska	5.3 (4,6,5,6)	Kaoma - "Lambada"
Joanna Jabłczyńska	5.8 (5,6,6,6)	Kalina Jędrusik - "Bo we mnie jest seks"
Joanna Jabłczyńska	5.5 (5,6,5,6)	"Memory" from "Cats" duet with Marek Torzewski
Krzysztof Respondek	6.0 (6,6,6,6)	"La dance de Canares"
Krzysztof Respondek	5.5 (5,6,5,6)	Eruption - "One Way Ticket"
Krzysztof Respondek	5.9 (6,6,5.5,6)	Grażyna Brodzińska & Bogusław Morka - "Usta milczą, dusza śpiewa" duet with Alicja Węgorzewska

=== Week 12 ===
Individual judges scores in charts below (given in parentheses) are listed in this order from left to right: Edyta Górniak, Elżbieta Zapendowska, Rudi Schuberth

Running order

Star	Score	Song
Kacper Kuszewski	6.0 (6,6,6)	Zbigniew Wodecki - "Z Tobą chcę oglądać świat"
Kacper Kuszewski	6.0 (6,6,6)	Bohdan Łazuka - "Tajemnice Mundialu"
Joanna Jabłczyńska	6.0 (6,6,6)	Anna Jantar - "Radość najpiękniejszych lat"
Joanna Jabłczyńska	6.0 (6,6,6)	Maryla Rodowicz - "Futbol, Futbol, Futbol"
Krzysztof Respondek	6.0 (6,6,6)	Dżem - "Naiwne pytania"
Krzysztof Respondek	6.0 (6,6,6)	Marek Torzewski - "Do boju Polsko!"

Another Songs

Star	Song
Aneta Zając; Anna Janocha; Monika Dryl	Majka Jeżowska - "A ja wolę moją mamę"
Joanna Kurowska; Michał Koterski	Wojciech Młynarski - "Nie ma jak u mam" Trubadurzy - "Przyjedź, mamo, na przysięgę"
Katarzyna Sowińska; Tomasz Bednarek; Dariusz Kordek; Wojciech Medyński	Niebiesko-Czarni - "Mamo, nasza mamo"
Olga Bończyk	Urszula Sipińska - "Mam cudownych rodziców"
Wojciech Medyński; Grażyna Szapołowska	Irena Santor -"Serce"
Dariusz Kordek; Monika Dryl	Maryla Rodowicz - "Co się stało z mamą?"

=== Week 13 ===
Individual judges scores in charts below (given in parentheses) are listed in this order from left to right: Edyta Górniak, Elżbieta Zapendowska, Rudi Schuberth

Running order

Star	Score	Song
Kacper Kuszewski	6.0 (6,6,6,6)	Frank Sinatra - "New York, New York"
Joanna Jabłczyńska	6.0 (6,6,6,6)	Michael Bublé - "Sway"
Krzysztof Respondek	6.0 (6,6,6,6)	Perfect - "Nie mogę Ci wiele dać"

Individual judges scores in charts below (given in parentheses) are listed in this order from left to right: Edyta Górniak, Elżbieta Zapendowska, Rudi Schuberth, Kacper Kuszewski

Running order

Star	Score	Song
Joanna Jabłczyńska	6.0 (6,6,6,6)	Lady Pank - "Zawsze tam gdzie Ty"
Joanna Jabłczyńska	6.0 (6,6,6,6)	"Wyginam śmiało ciało" from Madagascar
Joanna Jabłczyńska	6.0 (6,6,6,6)	Bajm - "Piechotą do lata"
Krzysztof Respondek	6.0 (6,6,6,6)	Lady Pank - "Kryzysowa narzeczona"
Krzysztof Respondek	6.0 (6,6,6,6)	"Hakuna Matata" from Lion King
Krzysztof Respondek	6.0 (6,6,6,6)	Maciej Kossowski - "Wakacje z blondynką"

== Song Chart ==
Star	Week 1	Week 2	Week 3	Week 4	Week 5	Week 6	Week 7	Week 8		Week 9		Week 10		Week 11			Week 12		Week 13 Final			
Krzysztof Respondek	O, Hela!	Whisky	Szczęśliwej drogi już czas	Tańcz, głupia, tańcz	Wind of change	Bo tutaj jest, jak jest	Baila	Biały miś	Mój jest ten kawałek podłogi	Wszystko mi mówi, że mnie ktoś pokochał	Oh, Carol	It's my life	Pamiętam ciebie z tamtych lat	La dance des canards	One way ticket	Usta milczą, dusza śpiewa	Naiwne pytania	Do boju, Polsko!	Nie mogę ci wiele dać	Kryzysowa narzeczona	Hakuna matata	Wakacje z blondynką
Joanna Jabłczyńska	I'm so excited	Czerwone korale	Can't take my eyes of you	O mnie się nie martw	It's raining man	Dmuchawce, latawce, wiatr	Być kobietą	Jej czarne oczy	Umbrella	Kaziu, zakochaj się	I'm walking on sunshine	Za tobą pójdę jak na bal	Odpływają kawiarenki	Lambada	Bo we mnie jet seks	Memory	Radość najpiękniejszych lat	Futbol	Sway	Zawsze tam, gdzie ty	Wyginam śmiało ciało	Piechotą do lata
Kacper Kuszewski	Copacabana	Całuj mnie	Zawsze tam, gdzie ty	Take on me	Bailamos	Cry just a little bit	Czy czuje pani cha-chę	Naj story	Uptown girl	Radość o poranku	Scenariusz dla moich sąsiadów	Careless whispers	Parostatek	Macarena	La isla Bonita	Time to say goodbye	Z tobą chcę oglądać świat	Tajemnice Mundialu	New York, New York			
Olga Bończyk	Prawy do lewego	Orła cień	To nie ja byłam Ewą	Let's get loud!	Ta sama chwila	Tylko mnie poproś do tańca	Prócz ciebie nic	Powiedz	All by myself	Tyle słońca w całym mieście	Holding out for a hero	Serca gwiazd	Zatańczysz ze mną jeszcze raz	Traviata								
Aneta Zając	Dżaga	Do nieba, do piekła	Venus	Just like a pill	Waterloo	Kanikuły	I love rock n roll	Czarownica	Zakręcona	Jambalaya	O nic nie pytaj	Hands up										
Grażyna Szapołowska	Oczy czarne	Jeszcze się tam żagiel bieli	Nie dokazuj	Hej, sokoły!	Takie tango	Miłość ci wszystko wybaczy	My Cyganie	Daj mi tę noc	Uciekaj serce	Wiosna, ach to ty												
Dariusz Kordek	Typ niepokorny	Kołysanka dla nieznajomej	Wielka miłość	Sailing	Słodkiego miłego życia	Mój przyjacielu	Felicita	Jesteś szalona														
Monika Dryl	Płynie w nas gorąca krew	Małgośka	What's love got to do with it?	Believe	Dziwny jest ten świat	The final countdown	Corazon espinad															
Michał Koterski	Jozin z Bazin	Chałupy	Biełyje rozy	Uważaj na niego	Beata z Albatrosa	Do zakochania jeden krok																
Wojciech Medyński	Maria	Ściernisko	This love	Teraz wiem																		
Anna Janocha	Serduszko puka w rytmie cha-cha	Jak się masz, kochanie?	Yes sir, I can boogie																			
Tomasz Bednarek	Stayin' alive	A gdy jest już ciemno																				
Joanna Kurowska	Niech mówią, że to nie jest miłość																					

Not scored
Highest scoring dance
Lowest scoring dance

== Song Schedule ==
- Week 1: Start
- Week 2: Karaoke Week
- Week 3: Lessons with Edyta Górniak
- Week 4: Songs from viewers
- Week 5: Challenge song
- Week 6: Lessons with Elżbieta Zapendowska
- Week 7: Duets Week
- Week 8: Disco Polo Week
- Week 9: May-day Picnic Week
- Week 10: Krzysztof Krawczyk Week
- Week 11: Dance Week & Aria Song
- Week 12: Songs for Mother & Football Song
- Week 13: Favorite Song, Lady Pank Song, Song from animation, Holiday Song

== Rating Figures ==
Episode	Date	Official rating 4+	Share 4+	Share 16–39
1	March 8, 2008	3 882 171	27,76%	23,32%
2	March 15, 2008	3 721 652	25,73%	22,42%
3	March 22, 2008	3 691 033	26,25%	23,83%
4	March 29, 2008	3 869 518	25,44%	24,36%
5	April 5, 2008	4 049 315	28,01%	25,67%
6	April 12, 2008	3 787 760	26,35%	25,26%
7	April 19, 2008	3 643 252	24,97%	22,81%
8	April 26, 2008	3 611 380	28,73%	25,59%
9	May 3, 2008	3 182 446	23,77%	19,84%
10	May 10, 2008	3 128 871	25,55%	23,60%
11	May 17, 2008	3 383 989	27,40%	23,52%
12	May 24, 2008	3 351 302	27,04%	23,79%
13	May 31, 2008	3 284 740	27,09%	24,64%
Average	–	3 583 305	26,47%	23,73%
