= Taniec z gwiazdami season 3 =

Taniec z gwiazdami
- Season 3
- Hosted by: Hubert Urbański; Katarzyna Skrzynecka
- Judges: Iwona Pavlović; Piotr Galiński; Beata Tyszkiewicz; Zbigniew Wodecki
- Celebrity winner: Rafał Mroczek
- Professional winner: Aneta Piotrowska
- No. of episodes: 10

Release
- Original network: TVN
- Original release: 5 March – 14 May 2006

Season chronology
- ← Previous; Season 2 Next → Season 4

The 3rd season of Taniec z Gwiazdami, the Polish edition of Dancing With the Stars, started on 5 March 2006 and ended on 14 May 2006. It was broadcast by TVN. Katarzyna Skrzynecka and Hubert Urbański continued as the hosts, and the judges were: Iwona Szymańska-Pavlović, Zbigniew Wodecki, Beata Tyszkiewicz and Piotr Galiński.

Rafał Mroczek and his partner Aneta Piotrowska were crowned the champions.

== Couples ==
Celebrity	Notability	Professional partner	Status
Paolo Cozza	Europa da się lubić star	Kamila Drezno	Eliminated 1st on 12 March 2006
Tomasz Stockinger	Klan actor	Blanka Winiarska	Eliminated 2nd on 19 March 2006
Rafał Cieszyński	Film and television actor	Magdalena Soszyńska	Eliminated 3rd on 26 March 2006
Aneta Kręglicka	Miss World 1989 and businesswoman	Robert Rowiński	Eliminated 4th on 9 April 2006
Renata Dancewicz	Na Wspólnej actress	Marcin Olszewski	Eliminated 5th on 16 April 2006
Robert Rozmus	Film and television actor	Anna Głogowska	Eliminated 6th on 23 April 2006
Joanna Jabłczyńska	Na Wspólnej actress	Piotr Kiszka	Eliminated 6th on 30 April 2006
Joanna Koroniewska	M jak miłość actress	Robert Kochanek	Third place on 7 May 2006
Aleksandra Kwaśniewska	Aleksander Kwaśniewski's daughter	Rafał Maserak	Runners-up on 14 May 2006
Rafał Mroczek	M jak miłość actor	Aneta Piotrowska	Winners on 14 May 2006

== Scores ==
Couple	Place	1	2	1+2	3	4	5	6	7	8	9	10
Rafał & Aneta	1	22	33†	55	34	34	36†	40†	39†	30+40=70‡	31+38=69‡	37+40+40=117‡
Aleksandra & Rafał	2	29	28	57	32	26	33	38	37	37+38=75†	37+39=76†	39+40+40=119†
Joanna & Robert	3	29	29	58	35†	32	30	33	29‡	36+39=75†	33+36=69‡	
Joanna & Piotr	4	23	25	48	31	35	36†	32	34	40+34=74		
Robert & Anna	5	32†	30	62†	28	36†	32	33	33			
Renata & Marcin	6	24	22	46	26‡	25	26‡	28‡				
Aneta & Robert	7	25	30	55	30	31	29					
Rafał & Magdalena	8	30	23	53	34	22‡						
Tomasz & Blanka	9	25	24	49	28							
Paolo & Kamila	10	18‡	19‡	37‡								

Red numbers indicate the lowest score for each week.
Green numbers indicate the highest score for each week.
indicates the couple eliminated that week.
indicates the returning couple that finished in the bottom two.
indicates the winning couple of the week.
indicates the runner-up of the week.

Notes:
Week 1: Robert Rozmus scored 32 out of 40 for his Cha-cha-cha and it was the highest score in Week 1. Paolo Cozza got the lowest score in history of the show, scoring 18 out of 40 for his Waltz. There was no elimination this week.

Week 2: Rafał Mroczek scored 33 out of 40 on his second dance (Quickstep). It was the highest score in Week 2. Paolo Cozza got 19 points for his Rumba, making it the lowest score of the week. Paolo & Kamila were eliminated.

Week 3: Joanna Koroniewska scored 35 out of 40 on her third dance (Tango). It was the highest score in Week 3. Renata Dancewicz got 26 points for her Tango, making it the lowest score of the week. Tomasz & Blanka were eliminated despite being 2 points from the bottom.

Week 4: Robert Rozmus scored 36 out of 40 on his 4th dance (Foxtrot). It was the highest score in Week 4. Rafał Cieszyński got 22 points for his Paso Doble, making it the lowest score of the week. Rafał & Magdalena were eliminated.

Week 5: Rafał Mroczek and Joanna Jabłczyńska scored 36 out of 40 on their 5th dance (Samba). It was the highest score in Week 5. Renata Dancewicz got 26 points for her Samba, making it the lowest score of the week. Aneta & Robert were eliminated.

Week 6: All couples danced to songs from famous musicals. Rafał Mroczek received the first perfect score of the season for his Waltz. Renata Dancewicz got 28 points for her Cha-cha-cha, making it the lowest score of the week. Renata & Marcin were eliminated.

Week 7: All couples danced to songs from famous TV series. Rafał Mroczek scored 39 out of 40 for his Rumba. It was the highest score in Week 7. Joanna Koroniewska got 29 points for her Foxtrot, making it the lowest score of the week. Robert & Anna were eliminated despite being 4 points from the bottom.

Week 8: All couples danced to the most famous songs of the rock band The Beatles. Rafał Mroczek received his second perfect score for the Jive and Joanna Jabłczyńska received her first perfect score for the Waltz. Rafał Mroczek also got 30 points for his Tango, making it the lowest score of the week. Joanna & Piotr were eliminated despite being 4 points from the bottom.

Week 9: Aleksandra Kwaśniewska scored 37 out of 40 for her Rumba and 39 out of 40 for her Quickstep. It was the highest score in Week 9. Joanna & Robert were eliminated.

Week 10: Rafał Mroczek received his third perfect score for the Freestyle and Aleksandra Kwaśniewska received her first and second perfect score for the Tango and Freestyle. Rafał Mroczek became the third winner in the history of the show. This is the third time the season's winner was on the first place on the judges' general scoreboard.

== Average Chart ==
Rank by average	Place	Team	Average	Total	Best Score	Worst Score
1.	1.	Rafał Mroczek & Aneta Piotrowska	35.3	494	40	22
2.	2.	Aleksandra Kwaśniewska & Rafał Maserak	35.2	493	40	26
3.	3.	Joanna Koroniewska & Robert Kochanek	32.8	361	39	29
4.	4.	Joanna Jabłczyńska & Piotr Kiszka	32.2	290	40	23
5.	5.	Robert Rozmus & Anna Głogowska	32	224	36	28
6.	7.	Aneta Kręglicka & Robert Rowiński	29	145	31	25
7.	8.	Rafał Cieszyński & Magdalena Soszyńska-Michno	27.3	109	34	22
8.	9.	Tomasz Stockinger & Blanka Winiarska	25.7	77	28	24
9.	6.	Renata Dancewicz & Marcin Olszewski	25.2	151	28	22
10.	10.	Paolo Cozza & Kamila Drezno	18.5	37	19	18
Everyteam			29.32	2380		

== Average Dance Chart ==
Couples	Averages	Best Dances	Worst Dances
Rafał & Aneta	35.3	Waltz (twice), Jive, Freestyle (40)	Cha-Cha-Cha (22)
Aleksandra & Rafał	35.2	Tango, Freestyle (40)	Foxtrot (26)
Joanna & Robert	32.8	Tango (39)	Waltz, Rumba, Foxtrot (29)
Joanna & Piotr	32.2	Waltz (40)	Cha-Cha-Cha (23)
Robert & Anna	32.0	Foxtrot (36)	Jive (28)
Aneta & Robert	29.0	Foxtrot (31)	Quickstep (25)
Rafał & Magdalena	27.5	Tango (34)	Paso Doble (22)
Tomasz & Blanka	25.6	Tango (28)	Rumba (24)
Renata & Marcin	25.1	Cha-Cha-Cha (28)	Rumba (22)
Paolo & Kamila	18.5	Rumba (19)	Waltz (18)

== Highest and lowest scoring performances ==
The best and worst performances in each dance according to the judges' marks are as follows:

Dance	Best dancer	Best score	Worst dancer	Worst score
Cha-Cha-Cha	Aleksandra Kwaśniewska	38	Rafał Mroczek	22
Waltz	Joanna Jabłczyńska; Rafał Mroczek	40	Paolo Cozza	18
Quickstep	Aleksandra Kwaśniewska	39	Joanna Jabłczyńska; Aneta Kręglicka	25
Rumba	Rafał Mroczek; Aleksandra Kwaśniewska	39	Paolo Cozza	19
Jive	Rafał Mroczek	40	Robert Rozmus	28
Tango	Aleksandra Kwaśniewska	40	Renata Dancewicz	26
Foxtrot	Rafał Mroczek	38	Aleksandra Kwaśniewska	26
Paso Doble	Aleksandra Kwaśniewska	37	Rafał Cieszyński	22
Samba	Rafał Mroczek	37	Renata Dancewicz	26
Freestyle	Rafał Mroczek; Aleksandra Kwaśniewska	40		

== Episodes ==
=== Week 1 ===
Individual judges scores in charts below (given in parentheses) are listed in this order from left to right: Iwona Pavlović, Zbigniew Wodecki, Beata Tyszkiewicz, Piotr Galiński.

Running order

Couple	Score	Style	Music
Aneta & Robert	25 (5,7,8,5)	Quickstep	"I Got Rhythm"—George Gershwin
Tomasz & Blanka	25 (6,6,7,6)	Waltz	"Around the World"—Nat King Cole
Joanna & Piotr	23 (5,6,8,4)	Cha-Cha-Cha	"Sweet Dreams (Are Made of This)"—Eurythmics
Paolo & Kamila	18 (3,5,6,4)	Waltz	"Più che puoi"—Eros Ramazzotti
Rafał & Aneta	22 (4,7,7,4)	Cha-Cha-Cha	"Get the Party Started"—Pink
Renata & Marcin	24 (5,6,8,5)	Waltz	"Jesse"—Shirley Bassey
Aleksandra & Rafał	29 (6,7,9,7)	Cha-Cha-Cha	"Ai No Corrida"—Quincy Jones
Rafał & Magdalena	30 (7,7,9,7)	Waltz	"What the World Needs Now Is Love"—Jackie DeShannon
Robert & Anna	32 (7,8,9,8)	Cha-Cha-Cha	"Sway"—Michael Bublé
Joanna & Robert	29 (7,7,9,6)	Waltz	"Moon River"—Shirley Bassey

=== Week 2 ===
Running order

Couple	Score	Style	Music	Results
Renata & Marcin	22 (4,7,8,3)	Rumba	"When You Say Nothing at All"—Ronan Keating	Safe
Aleksandra & Rafał	28 (5,8,9,6)	Quickstep	Theme of the Spider-Man	Safe
Paolo & Kamila	19 (3,6,7,3)	Rumba	"Private Dancer"—Tina Turner	Eliminated
Joanna & Piotr	25 (5,7,8,5)	Quickstep	"Straighten Up and Fly Right"—Nat King Cole	Safe
Tomasz & Blanka	24 (5,7,7,5)	Rumba	"Take a Bow"—Madonna	Bottom two
Rafał & Aneta	33 (8,8,9,8)	Quickstep	"Wonderwall"—Oasis	Safe
Rafał & Magdalena	23 (5,7,7,4)	Rumba	"Woman in Love"—Barbra Streisand	Safe
Aneta & Robert	30 (6,8,9,7)	Cha-Cha-Cha	"Can't Get You Out of My Head"—Kylie Minogue	Safe
Joanna & Robert	29 (7,7,9,6)	Rumba	"You're Beautiful"—James Blunt	Safe
Robert & Anna	30 (6,9,8,7)	Quickstep	"You Wanna Be Americano"—Lou Bega	Safe

=== Week 3 ===
Running order

Couple	Score	Style	Music	Results
Joanna & Piotr	31 (7,8,9,7)	Jive	"Just a Gigolo"—David Lee Roth	Safe
Tomasz & Blanka	28 (6,7,8,7)	Tango	"Libertango"—Astor Piazzolla	Eliminated
Aleksandra & Rafał	32 (7,9,9,7)	Jive	"Two Hearts"—Phil Collins	Safe
Renata & Marcin	26 (4,7,9,6)	Tango	"Voulez-Vous"—ABBA	Bottom two
Robert & Anna	28 (5,9,8,6)	Jive	"Crazy Little Thing Called Love"—Queen	Safe
Joanna & Robert	35 (8,9,9,9)	Tango	"Ole Guapa"—André Rieu	Safe
Aneta & Robert	30 (6,8,9,7)	Jive	"You Never Can Tell"—Chuck Berry	Safe
Rafał & Magdalena	34 (8,9,9,8)	Tango	"Hey Sexy Lady"—Shaggy	Safe
Rafał & Aneta	34 (8,8,9,9)	Jive	"Jailhouse Rock"—Elvis Presley	Safe

=== Week 4 ===
Running order

Couple	Score	Style	Music	Results
Aneta & Robert	31 (6,8,9,8)	Foxtrot	"Everybody Loves Somebody"—Frank Sinatra	Safe
Rafał & Aneta	34 (8,8,9,9)	Foxtrot	"Unforgettable"—Nat King Cole	Safe
Rafał & Magdalena	22 (4,7,7,4)	Paso Doble	"Arriba Arriba"—Claudio Novelli	Eliminated
Aleksandra & Rafał	26 (4,8,8,6)	Foxtrot	"Beyond the Sea"—Bobby Darin	Safe
Joanna & Robert	32 (7,8,9,8)	Paso Doble	"Enter Sandman"—Metallica	Bottom two
Joanna & Piotr	35 (8,9,9,9)	Foxtrot	"Hello"—Paul Anka	Safe
Renata & Marcin	25 (5,8,8,4)	Paso Doble	"Another Brick in the Wall"—Pink Floyd	Safe
Robert & Anna	36 (9,9,9,9)	Foxtrot	"Raindrops Keep Falling on My Head"—Burt Bacharach	Safe

=== Week 5 ===
Running order

Couple	Score	Style	Music	Results
Joanna & Piotr	36 (9,9,9,9)	Samba	"Copacabana"—Barry Manilow	Safe
Aneta & Robert	29 (6,8,8,7)	Samba	"Baila, Baila Conmigo"—Gipsy Kings	Eliminated
Joanna & Robert	30 (7,8,8,7)	Samba	"Asereje"—Las Ketchup	Safe
Rafał & Aneta	36 (9,9,9,9)	Samba	"Mujer Latina"—Thalía	Safe
Renata & Marcin	26 (5,8,8,5)	Samba	"Oye Mi Canto"—Gloria Estefan	Bottom two
Aleksandra & Rafał	33 (7,8,9,9)	Samba	"Bamboleo"—Gipsy Kings	Safe
Robert & Anna	32 (7,8,8,9)	Samba	"Sing It Back"—Moloko	Safe

=== Week 6: Musical Week ===
Running order

Couple	Score	Style	Music	Musical	Results
Robert & Anna	33 (8,9,8,8)	Paso Doble	"Heaven on Their Minds"—Murray Head	Jesus Christ Superstar	Safe
Aleksandra & Rafał	38 (9,10,10,9)	Tango	"The Phantom of the Opera"—Sarah Brightman and Steve Harley	The Phantom of the Opera	Safe
Renata & Marcin	28 (6,8,9,5)	Cha-Cha-Cha	"Summer Nights"—John Travolta and Olivia Newton-John	Grease	Eliminated
Rafał & Aneta	40 (10,10,10,10)	Waltz	"Sunrise, Sunset"—Anthony Newley and Linda Hibberd	Fiddler on the Roof	Safe
Joanna & Robert	33 (7,8,9,9)	Cha-Cha-Cha	"Night Fever"—Bee Gees	Saturday Night Fever	Bottom two
Joanna & Piotr	32 (7,9,9,7)	Tango	"In God We Trust"—Robert Janowski	Metro	Safe

=== Week 7: TV Series' Themes Week ===
Running order

Couple	Score	Style	Music	TV Series	Results
Joanna & Robert	29 (6,8,9,6)	Foxtrot	"Janosik"—Jerzy Matuszkiewicz	Janosik	Bottom two
Joanna & Piotr	34 (7,9,10,8)	Paso Doble	"Czarne chmury"—Waldemar Kazanecki	Black Clouds	Safe
Robert & Anna	33 (7,9,9,8)	Tango	"Uciekaj moje serce"—Seweryn Krajewski	Jan Serce	Eliminated
Aleksandra & Rafał	37 (8,10,9,10)	Paso Doble	"W stepie szerokim"—Leszek Herdegen	Przygody pana Michała	Safe
Rafał & Aneta	39 (9,10,10,10)	Rumba	"07 zgłoś się"—Włodzimierz Korcz	007 Report to	Safe
Joanna & Piotr; Rafał & Aneta; Aleksandra & Rafał; Robert & Anna; Joanna & Robert	N/A	Viennese Waltz	"With a Little Help from My Friends"—The Beatles	The Wonder Years	

=== Week 8: The Beatles Week ===
Running order

Couple	Score	Style	Music	Results
Rafał & Aneta	30 (6,9,8,7)	Tango	"Eleanor Rigby"—The Beatles	Safe
Rafał & Aneta	40 (10,10,10,10)	Jive	"Help!"—The Beatles	Safe
Aleksandra & Rafał	37 (8,10,10,9)	Waltz	"Yesterday"—The Beatles	Safe
Aleksandra & Rafał	38 (9,10,10,9)	Cha-Cha-Cha	"Obladi, oblada"—The Beatles	Safe
Joanna & Robert	36 (8,9,9,10)	Jive	"Can't Buy Me Love"—The Beatles	Bottom two
Joanna & Robert	39 (9,10,10,10)	Tango	"I Love Her"—The Beatles	Bottom two
Joanna & Piotr	40 (10,10,10,10)	Waltz	"Michelle"—The Beatles	Eliminated
Joanna & Piotr	34 (7,9,10,8)	Cha-Cha-Cha	"I Saw Her Standing There"—The Beatles	Eliminated

=== Week 9 ===
Running order

Couple	Score	Style	Music	Results
Aleksandra & Rafał	37 (8,10,10,9)	Rumba	"Nine Million Bicycles"—Katie Melua	Bottom two
Aleksandra & Rafał	39 (9,10,10,10)	Quickstep	"Puttin' on the Ritz"—Fred Astaire	Bottom two
Joanna & Robert	33 (7,9,9,8)	Quickstep	"Hello Dolly!"—Louis Armstrong	Eliminated
Joanna & Robert	36 (8,10,9,9)	Rumba	"Don't Know Why"—Norah Jones	Eliminated
Rafał & Aneta	31 (7,9,8,7)	Paso Doble	"The Show Must Go On"—Queen	Safe
Rafał & Aneta	38 (10,10,9,9)	Foxtrot	"Don't Worry Be Happy"—Bobby McFerrin	Safe

=== Week 10: Final ===
Running order

Couple	Score	Style	Music	Results
Rafał & Aneta	37 (9,10,9,9)	Samba	"Mujer Latina"—Thalía	Winners
Rafał & Aneta	40 (10,10,10,10)	Waltz	"Sunrise, Sunset" from Fiddler on the Roof	Winners
Rafał & Aneta	40 (10,10,10,10)	Freestyle	"Cry"—Michael Jackson "Black or White"—Michael Jackson	Winners
Aleksandra & Rafał	39 (9,10,10,10)	Rumba	"Nine Million Bicycles"—Katie Melua	Runners-up
Aleksandra & Rafał	40 (10,10,10,10)	Tango	"The Phantom of the Opera" from The Phantom of the Opera	Runners-up
Aleksandra & Rafał	40 (10,10,10,10)	Freestyle	"I Will Always Love You"—Whitney Houston "Queen of the Night"—Whitney Houston	Runners-up

Other Dances

Couple	Style	Music
Paolo & Kamila	Rumba	"Private Dancer"—Tina Turner
Tomasz & Blanka	Tango	"Libertango"—Astor Piazzolla
Rafał & Magdalena	Paso Doble	"Arriba Arriba"—Claudio Novelli
Aneta & Robert	Jive	"You Never Can Tell"—Chuck Berry
Renata & Marcin	Paso Doble	"Another Brick in the Wall"—Pink Floyd
Robert & Anna	Cha-Cha-Cha	"Sway"—Michael Bublé
Joanna & Piotr	Waltz	"Michelle"—The Beatles
Joanna & Robert	Foxtrot	"Janosik"—Jerzy Matuszkiewicz (Janosik Theme)
Katarzyna Cichopek & Marcin Hakiel (2nd Season Winners)	Tango	"El Tango De Roxanne"—The Police (Moulin Rouge! Theme)
Paolo & Kamila; Tomasz & Blanka; Rafał & Magdalena; Aneta & Robert; Renata & Marcin; Robert & Anna; Joanna & Piotr; Joanna & Robert; Aleksandra & Rafał; Rafał & Aneta	Group Viennese Waltz	"We Are The Champions"—Queen

== Dance Schedule ==
The celebrities and professional partners danced one of these routines for each corresponding week.

- Week 1: Cha-Cha-Cha or Waltz
- Week 2: Rumba or Quickstep
- Week 3: Jive or Tango
- Week 4: Paso Doble or Foxtrot
- Week 5: Samba
- Week 6: One unlearned dance (Musical Week)
- Week 7: One unlearned dance & Group Viennese Waltz (TV Series Song Week)
- Week 8: One unlearned dance & one repeated dance (The Beatles Week)
- Week 9: One unlearned dance & one repeated dance
- Week 10: Favorite Latin dance, favorite Ballroom dance & Freestyle

=== Dances Chart ===
Team	Week 1	Week 2	Week 3	Week 4	Week 5	Week 6	Week 7		Week 8		Week 9		Week 10 Final		
Rafał & Aneta	Cha-Cha-Cha	Quickstep	Jive	Foxtrot	Samba	Waltz	Rumba	Group Viennese Waltz	Tango	Jive	Paso Doble	Foxtrot	Waltz	Samba	Freestyle
Aleksandra & Rafał	Cha-Cha-Cha	Quickstep	Jive	Foxtrot	Samba	Tango	Paso Doble	Group Viennese Waltz	Waltz	Cha-Cha-Cha	Rumba	Quickstep	Tango	Rumba	Freestyle
Joanna & Robert	Waltz	Rumba	Tango	Paso Doble	Samba	Cha-Cha-Cha	Foxtrot	Group Viennese Waltz	Jive	Tango	Quickstep	Rumba			Foxtrot
Joanna & Piotr	Cha-Cha-Cha	Quickstep	Jive	Foxtrot	Samba	Tango	Paso Doble	Group Viennese Waltz	Waltz	Cha-Cha-Cha					Waltz
Robert & Anna	Cha-Cha-Cha	Quickstep	Jive	Foxtrot	Samba	Paso Doble	Tango	Group Viennese Waltz							Cha-Cha-Cha
Renata & Marcin	Waltz	Rumba	Tango	Paso Doble	Samba	Cha-Cha-Cha									Paso Doble
Aneta & Robert	Quickstep	Cha-Cha-Cha	Jive	Foxtrot	Samba										Jive
Rafał & Magdalena	Waltz	Rumba	Tango	Paso Doble											Tango
Tomasz & Blanka	Waltz	Rumba	Tango												Waltz
Paolo & Kamila	Waltz	Rumba													Rumba

Highest scoring dance
Lowest scoring dance
Performed, but not scored

== Episode results ==
Order	Week 2	Week 3	Week 4	Week 5	Week 6	Week 7	Week 8	Week 9	Week 10 Final
1	Rafał & Aneta	Rafał & Aneta	Robert & Anna	Rafał & Aneta	Rafał & Aneta	Rafał & Aneta	Aleksandra & Rafał	Rafał & Aneta	Rafał & Aneta
2	Aleksandra & Rafał	Aleksandra & Rafał	Rafał & Aneta	Joanna & Piotr	Aleksandra & Rafał	Aleksandra & Rafał	Rafał & Aneta	Aleksandra & Rafał	Aleksandra & Rafał
3	Robert & Anna	Joanna & Robert	Joanna & Piotr	Aleksandra & Rafał	Joanna & Piotr	Joanna & Piotr	Joanna & Robert	Joanna & Robert	
4	Joanna & Piotr	Joanna & Piotr	Aleksandra & Rafał	Robert & Anna	Robert & Anna	Joanna & Robert	Joanna & Piotr		
5	Aneta & Robert	Robert & Anna	Renata & Marcin	Joanna & Robert	Joanna & Robert	Robert & Anna			
6	Joanna & Robert	Rafał & Magdalena	Aneta & Robert	Renata & Marcin	Renata & Marcin				
7	Renata & Marcin	Aneta & Robert	Joanna & Robert	Aneta & Robert					
8	Rafał & Magdalena	Renata & Marcin	Rafał & Magdalena						
9	Tomasz & Blanka	Tomasz & Blanka							
10	Paolo & Kamila								

This couple came in first place with the judges.
This couple came in first place with the judges and gained the highest number of viewers' votes.
This couple gained the highest number of viewers' votes.
This couple came in last place with the judges and gained the highest number of viewers' votes.
This couple came in last place with the judges.
This couple came in last place with the judges and was eliminated.
This couple was eliminated.
This couple won the competition.
This couple came in second in the competition.
This couple came in third in the competition.

== Audience voting results ==
Order	Week 2	Week 3	Week 4	Week 5	Week 6	Week 7	Week 8	Week 9	Week 10 Final
1	Aleksandra & Rafał	Rafał & Aneta	Aleksandra & Rafał	Rafał & Aneta	Rafał & Aneta	Rafał & Aneta	Rafał & Aneta	Rafał & Aneta	Rafał & Aneta
2	Rafał & Aneta	Aleksandra & Rafał	Rafał & Aneta	Aleksandra & Rafał	Aleksandra & Rafał	Aleksandra & Rafał	Aleksandra & Rafał	Aleksandra & Rafał	Aleksandra & Rafał
3	Joanna & Piotr	Robert & Anna	Robert & Anna	Joanna & Piotr	Joanna & Piotr	Joanna & Piotr	Joanna & Piotr	Joanna & Robert	
4	Robert & Anna	Joanna & Piotr	Joanna & Piotr	Robert & Anna	Renata & Marcin	Joanna & Robert	Joanna & Robert		
5	Renata & Marcin	Joanna & Robert	Renata & Marcin	Renata & Marcin	Robert & Anna	Robert & Anna			
6	Joanna & Robert	Aneta & Robert	Rafał & Magdalena	Joanna & Robert	Joanna & Robert				
7	Aneta & Robert	Renata & Marcin	Aneta & Robert	Aneta & Robert					
8	Rafał & Magdalena	Rafał & Magdalena	Joanna & Robert						
9	Paolo & Kamila	Tomasz & Blanka							
10	Tomasz & Blanka								

== Guest performances ==
Date	Artist(s)	Song	Dancers
9 April 2006	Sambal	"Samba Batucada"
16 April 2006	Adam Sztaba's Orchestra	"Everybody Needs Somebody to Love"	Group VOLT
16 April 2006	Ewelina Flinta	"Aquarius"	Group VOLT
23 April 2006	Adam Sztaba's Orchestra	Wojna domowa Theme	Group VOLT
23 April 2006	Adam Sztaba's Orchestra	"Życie jest nowelą"
30 April 2006	Adam Sztaba's Orchestra	"She Loves You"	Group VOLT
7 May 2006	Adam Sztaba's Orchestra	"She Bangs"	Group VOLT
14 May 2006	Zbigniew Wodecki	"We Are The Champions"	All couples

== Rating Figures ==
Episode	Date	Official rating 4+	Share 4+	Share 16-39
1	5 March 2006	6 895 176	37,63%	39,43%
2	12 March 2006	6 997 775	39,30%	41,27%
3	19 March 2006	7 247 603	38,67%	40,59%
4	26 March 2006	7 096 456	38,49%	41,64%
5	9 April 2006	6 740 146	38,55%	38,60%
6	16 April 2006	5 397 241	32,74%	30,37%
7	23 April 2006	6 613 159	38,60%	41,70%
8	30 April 2006	6 020 520	37,73%	40,27%
9	7 May 2006	6 656 151	39,83%	43,40%
10	14 May 2006	7 401 241	43,63%	44,94%
Average	Season 3	6 743 493	38,63%	40,35%
