= Dancewicz =

Dancewicz is a Polish surname. Notable people with the name include:

- Dorota Dancewicz (1938–2016), Polish politician
- Frank Dancewicz (1924–1985), American football quarterback
- Renata Dancewicz (born 1969), Polish actress
