= Siwiec =

Siwiec is a Polish surname. It may refer to:

- Marek Siwiec (born 1955), Polish politician and journalist
- Natalia Siwiec (born 1983), Polish glamour model
- Ryszard Siwiec (1909–1968), Polish anti-communist

== See also ==
- [Grey-surname]]
