= Aneta Zając =

Polish actress (born 1982)

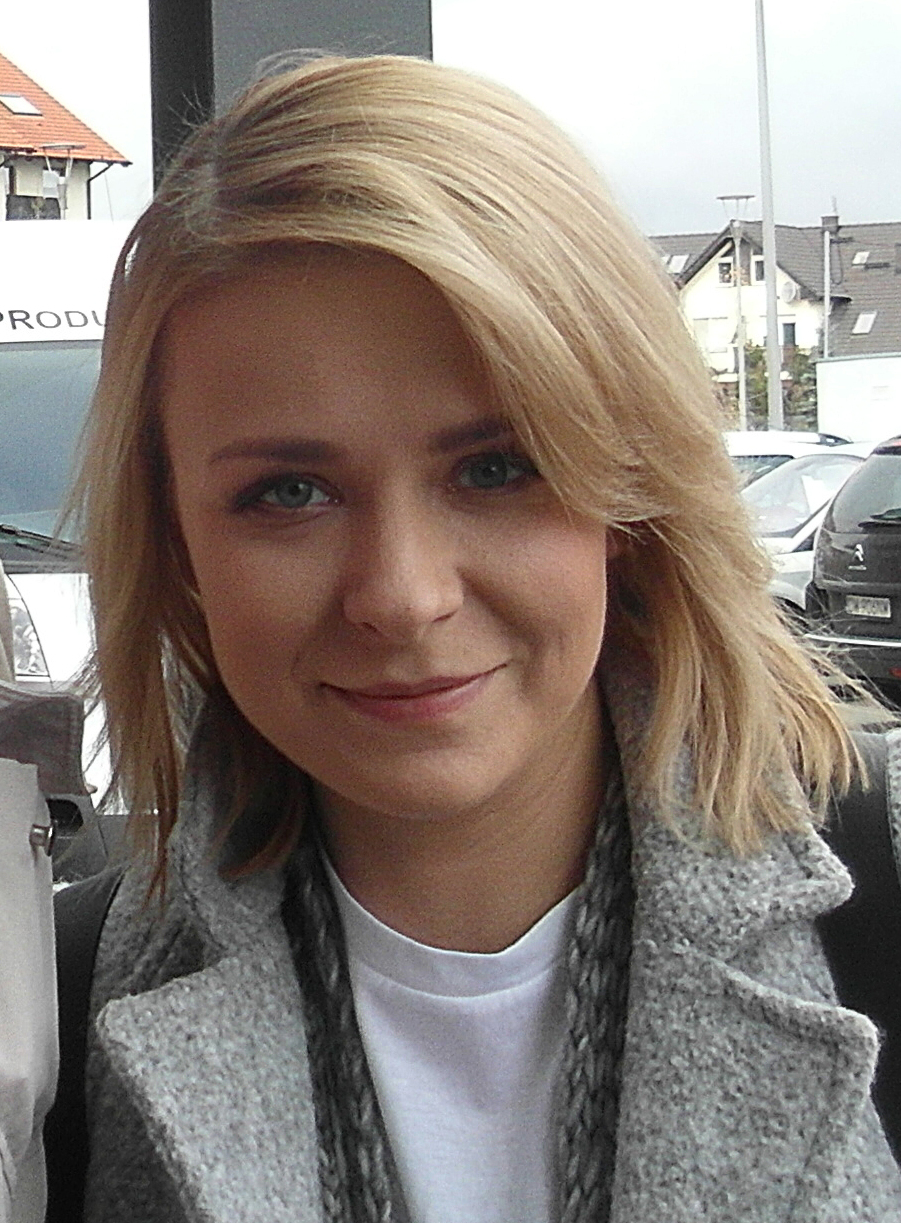
- Aneta Zając
- Born: April 19, 1982 (age 44); Warsaw, Poland
- Occupation: Actress
- Years active: 2000–present

Aneta Zając (born 19 April 1982, Warsaw) is a Polish actress.

In 2006, she graduated from The Leon Schiller National Higher School of Film, Television and Theatre in Łódź (Państwowa Wyższa Szkoła Filmowa, Telewizyjna i Teatralna im. Leona Schillera w Łodzi).

Since 2004 she has been playing main role in the Polish TV series Pierwsza miłość.

In 2008 she took part in 3rd season of Polsat show Jak oni śpiewają, which is the Polish version of Soapstar Superstar, finishing in 5th place.

In 2014 she was one of the contestants of Taniec z gwiazdami, the 14th season of the Polish edition of Dancing with the Stars. She won and got "Kryształowa Kula" and 100 000 zlotys.

== Filmography ==
=== List of television works ===
- 2000–2001: Na dobre i na złe – Jolanta Wolniak
- 2002–2004: Plebania – Aneta Kurowska
- 2003: Daleko od noszy – daughter of Półpielec
- 2003–2005: Sprawa na dziś – hospital receptionist
- 2004: Lokatorzy – Danuta Stachyra
- 2004–present: Pierwsza miłość – Marysia Radosz
- 2005: Pensjonat pod Różą – Magdalena Barcz
- 2007: Świat według Kiepskich – participant of TV show
- 2009: Doktor Dziwago – Ela
- 2012: Galeria – Mariola
- 2012: Hotel 52 – Malwina
- 2019–present: Pierwsza miłość – Dominika Porcz, Marysia's twin sister
- 2021: Pitbull – Nos' mother
- 2024–present: Policjantki i policjanci – Olga Zwolińska

=== List of film works ===
- 2013: Śliwowica – Marysia Radosz
