= Krzysztof Krawczyk =

Polish singer (1946–2021)

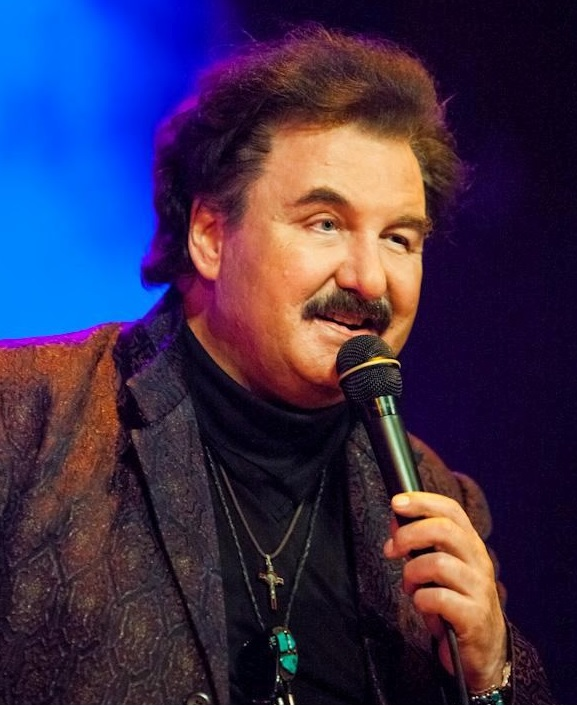
- Krzysztof Krawczyk (2018)
- Born: 8 September 1946; Katowice, Poland
- Died: 5 April 2021 (aged 74); Łódź, Poland
- Occupation: Singer
- Years active: 1963–2020
- Spouse(s): 1. Grażyna Adamus (divorced); 2. Halina Żytkowiak (divorced); 3. Ewa Trelko
- Children: 4 (1 son, 3 adopted daughters)
- Musical career
- Genres: Pop, country, tango, dance, rhythm and blues, folk, disco polo
- Labels: Pronit, Polskie Nagrania Muza, Wifon, TRC Records, PZ Tesco, Sonic, Brawo, Omega, Snake's Music, Hallmark Records, Credo Records, Intersound, Marfix, Koch International Poland, PolyPop/PolyGram Polska, Pomaton EMI, Point Music, Selles, Fan Music, Gama, GM Music, Zic Zac/BMG Poland, Accord Song, Sony BMG Music Entertainment Poland, Agencja Artystyczna MTJ, Warner Music Poland
- Website: www.krzysztofkrawczyk.eu

Krzysztof January Krawczyk ([ˈkʂɨʂtɔf ˈkraft͡ʂɨk]; 8 September 1946 – 5 April 2021) was a Polish baritone pop singer, guitarist and composer. He was the vocalist of a popular Polish band, Trubadurzy ("the Troubadours"), from 1963 to 1973 when he started his solo career. His creative activity in the area of music was characterized by a combination of various music genres such as rock and roll, country music, rhythm & blues, Polish folk music, and disco polo. His album To co w życiu ważne (lit. 'What's important in life') reached number one on the Polish Music Charts.

== Biography ==
Krawczyk learned to play the guitar on his own, whereas his vocal abilities were practised when he attended secondary school of music in Łódź. However, he had to quit his musical studies and become an errand-boy, because his father, an actor, died and his mother suffered from depression. He was the only member of the family to earn a living.

In 1963 he founded, together with Ryszard Poznakowski, Marian Lichtman, Sławomir Kowalewski and Halina Żytkowiak, one of the best known Polish beat music bands of the 1960s, Trubadurzy, which combined elements of rock with Polish folk music.

=== Solo career ===
Ten years after that band's establishment, Krawczyk started his solo career. In the 1970s he recorded several successful songs such as Parostatek (The steamship), Pokochaj moje marzenia (Love my dreams), Pamiętam Ciebie z tamtych lat (I remember you from those years) or Ostatni raz zatańczysz ze mną (You'll dance with me that last time). He had numerous performances at festivals in Opole, Sopot and Kołobrzeg. He also toured in all the countries of the Warsaw Pact as well as in Sweden, Greece, Belgium, the Netherlands and Ireland. His work of the 1970s was considered to be kitsch by some critics. Nevertheless, his songs of that time have been genuinely popular to this day.

He collaborated with a famous cabaret performer, Bohdan Smoleń. They released several humoristic songs around 1985, e.g. Mężczyzna po czterdziestce (The man in his forties) and Dziewczyny, które mam na myśli that borrowed melodies from Willie Nelson and Julio Iglesias' To all the girls I loved before (1984). All these songs were very different from what he had performed before.

In 1981 Krawczyk moved to the U.S. to perform and to record an album in Indianapolis for TRC Records. The 1982 LP, "From a Different Place", was distributed nationally; a single, "Solidarity", received heavy airplay in several cities, especially Chicago. John Cascella, later to become John Mellencamp's keyboardist, composed many of the songs on the album, which was produced by Gary Schatzlein. For U.S. audiences, Krawczyk's name was shortened and anglicized to "Krystof".

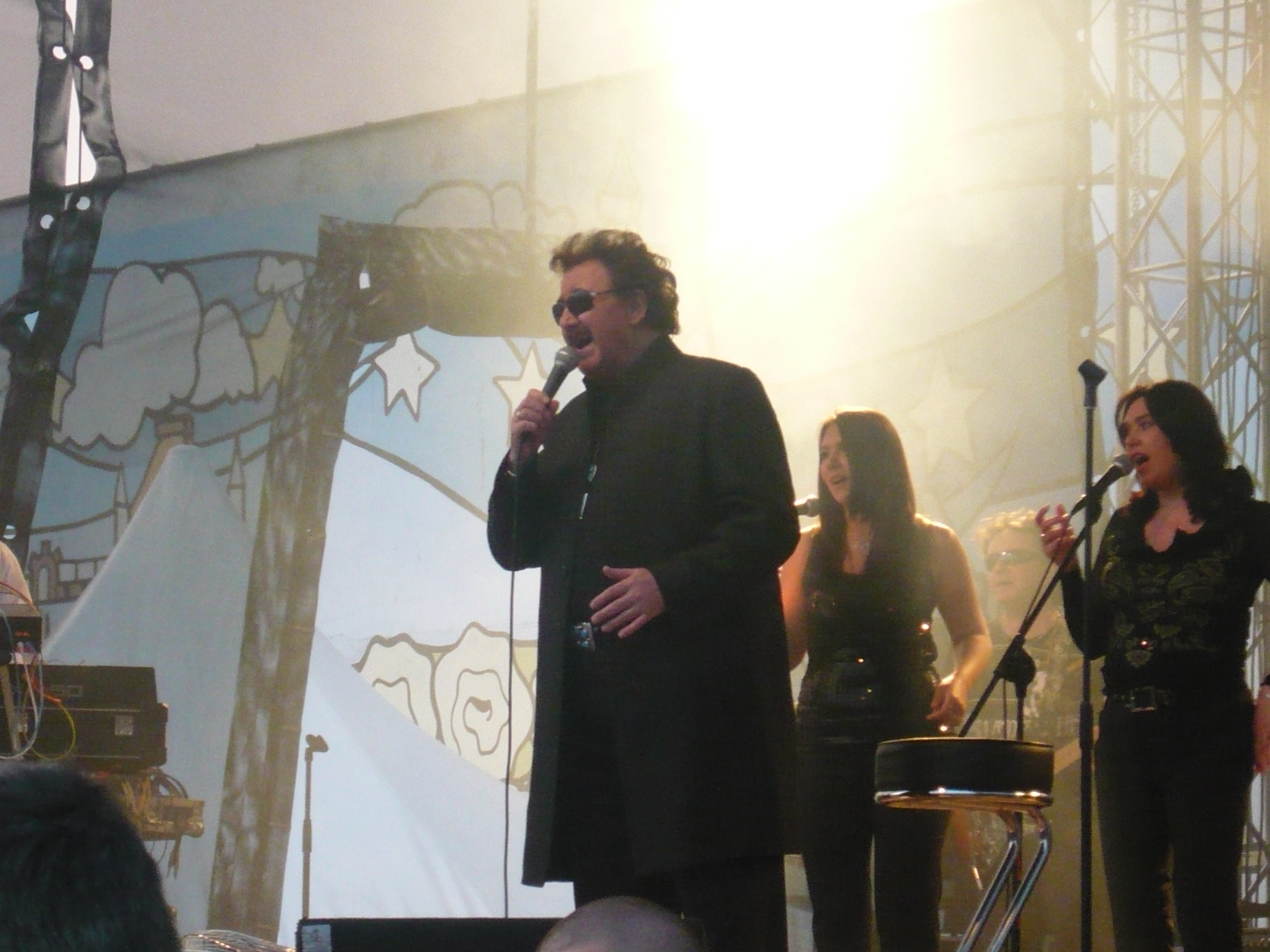
Krawczyk in Włocławek, 29 April 2009

While in the U.S., Krawczyk's wife Ewa helped him overcome addictions to alcohol and drugs. After a return to Poland in the mid 1980s, he underwent tonsil surgery and spent a year living in Kołobrzeg to recover his voice. In 1988, he was driving his family and fell asleep behind the wheel. As a result, he suffered numerous injuries that required long months of therapy. In the 1990s, he was in the US again. He returned to Poland in 1994. When he encountered lack of interest from esteemed music producers, he got involved in the disco polo business. He later admitted that this decision helped him to survive the "hard times", because the albums he made at that time were very successful. However, this did not protect him against constant criticism. In the late 1990s Krawczyk changed his image from a "discotheque playboy" to a mature middle-aged artist who propagated family values. In this way, he successfully came back on stage with such hits like Jestem sobą (I'm myself), Wiarygodny (The credible) or Bo jesteś Ty (Because you are). He sang with other artists, such as Andrzej Piaseczny, Edyta Bartosiewicz, Muniek Staszczyk, Goran Bregović and Rod Stewart.

In 2000, Krzysztof Krawczyk performed for Pope John Paul II in Saint Peter's Square in Vatican City.

=== Personal life ===
He was married three times. His first wife was Grażyna Adamus, whom he knew from school, but that marriage lasted only a short time. He had a grown-up son with his second wife, Halina Żytkowiak. Krawczyk lived in a small village of Grotniki near Łódź with his third wife, Ewa. They didn't have any children, so he informally adopted Ewa's sister's three daughters. Krawczyk said that he "lived without God" for 20 years, but was a devout believer.

== Death ==
On 25 March 2021, Krawczyk was admitted to hospital with COVID-19. He left the hospital on 3 April but died two days later from post COVID-19 complications. The artist's state funeral ceremonies took place on 10 April and began with a funeral mass in the Archcathedral Basilica of St. Stanislaus Kostka in Łódź. After the funeral mass, the singer was buried in the cemetery in Grotniki.

== Discography ==
=== With Trubadurzy ===
- Krajobrazy (1968, Gold album)
- Ej Sobótka, Sobótka (1969, Gold album)
- Kochana (1970, Gold album)
- Zaufaj sercu (1971, Gold album)
- Będziesz Ty (1973, Gold album)
- Znowu razem (1973, Gold album)

=== Solo ===
- Byłaś mi nadzieją (1974)
- Rysunek na szkle (1976, Gold album - 1978)
- Pieśni S. Jesienina (1977)
- Jak minął dzień (1977, Gold album - 1980)
- Dla mojej dziewczyny (1979)
- Don't leave me (1979)
- Good Ol' Rock N'Roll/Dobry Stary Rock (1980, Gold album - 1986)
- Niki w krainie techniki (1980)
- From a Different Place (As "Krystof", 1982)
- Kolędy Polskie (1986)
- Wstaje nowy dzień (1987)
- Country album (1987)
- My road (1989)
- Koncert jubileuszowy (1990)
- Co za cyrk (1990)
- The singles album (1991)
- Country na drogę (1991)
- Wszystko za disco (1991)
- Kolędy i pastorałki (1991)
- A kiedy będziesz moją żoną (1992)
- Collection (1992)
- Live koncert (1992)
- Gdy nam śpiewał Elvis Presley (1994, Gold album - 1996, Platinum album - 1997)
- Kolędy i piosenki świąteczne (1994)
- Gdy nam śpiewał Elvis Presley 2 (1995, Gold album - 1996)
- Świąteczne piosenki (1995)
- Ballady (1995)
- Canzone d'Amore (1995, Gold album)
- Krzysztof Krawczyk & weselni goście (1995)
- No Boundaries (1995)
- Złote przeboje (1996)
- Świąteczne piosenki (1996)
- Ave Maria (1997)
- Arrivederci moja dziewczyno (1997, Gold album)
- The Single Album (1998)
- Złote przeboje (1998)
- Jak przeżyć wszystko jeszcze raz (1998)
- Polskie Tango (1998)
- Album Jubileuszowy/Zawsze w drodze (1999)
- Gold (1999)
- Złota kolekcja - Pamiętam Ciebie z tamtych lat (1999, Gold album)
- Ojcu Świętemu śpiewajmy (1999, Gold album)
- Kolędy Polskie (1999)
- Platynowa kolekcja - Złote przeboje (1999)
- To, co dał nam los (2000)
- Zawsze w drodze (2000)
- Największe przeboje cz. 1 and Największe przeboje cz. 2 (2000)
- 2000 takich świąt (2000)
- Polskie kolędy (2000)
- Daj mi drugie życie feat. Goran Bregović (2001, Gold and then Platinum album)
- Byłaś mi nadzieją (2001, reedition of the 1974 album)
- Najpiękniejsze polskie kolędy – Polskie perły (2001)
- ... Bo marzę i śnię (2002, Platinum album)
- Cygańskie rytmy (Gwiazdy biesiadują) (2003)
- Live (2003, Gold album)
- Piosenki o miłości (2003)
- Złote przeboje (2003)
- Piosenki na Święta (2003)
- To co w życiu ważne (2004, Platinum album)
- The Best - Rysunek na szkle (2004)
- To, co w życiu ważne - Edycja specjalna (2004)
- Mona Lisa (2004)
- Jestem sobą (2004, Platinum album, 5 CDs)
- The Shadow Of Your Smile (2005)
- Amerykańskie piosenki (Edycja specjalna) (2005)
- Złota Kolekcja - Pamiętam Ciebie z tamtych lat (2005)
- Krzysztof Krawczyk - Special Edition - 3CD Box (2006)
- Tacy samotni (2006, Platinum album)
- Tacy samotni (Edycja Specjalna) (2007, Gold album)
- Gwiazdy XX Wieku - Krzysztof Krawczyk (2007)
- Leksykon Krzysztofa Krawczyka (7 CDs in 2007 plus 13 CDs in 2008)

== Filmography ==
- Szatan z siódmej klasy as scout (1960)
- Polowanie na muchy (1969)
- Zawodowcy - performance of songs (1975)
- Próba ognia i wody as himself (1978)
- The Lousy World as himself (episode "Wielki Bal", 1999)
- The Emperor's New Groove as Theme Song Guy (Polish dub, 2001)
- Nakręceni, czyli szołbiznes po polsku as himself (2003)
- Sie macie ludzie as himself (2004)
