= Grotniki, Łódź Voivodeship =

Grotniki
- Village
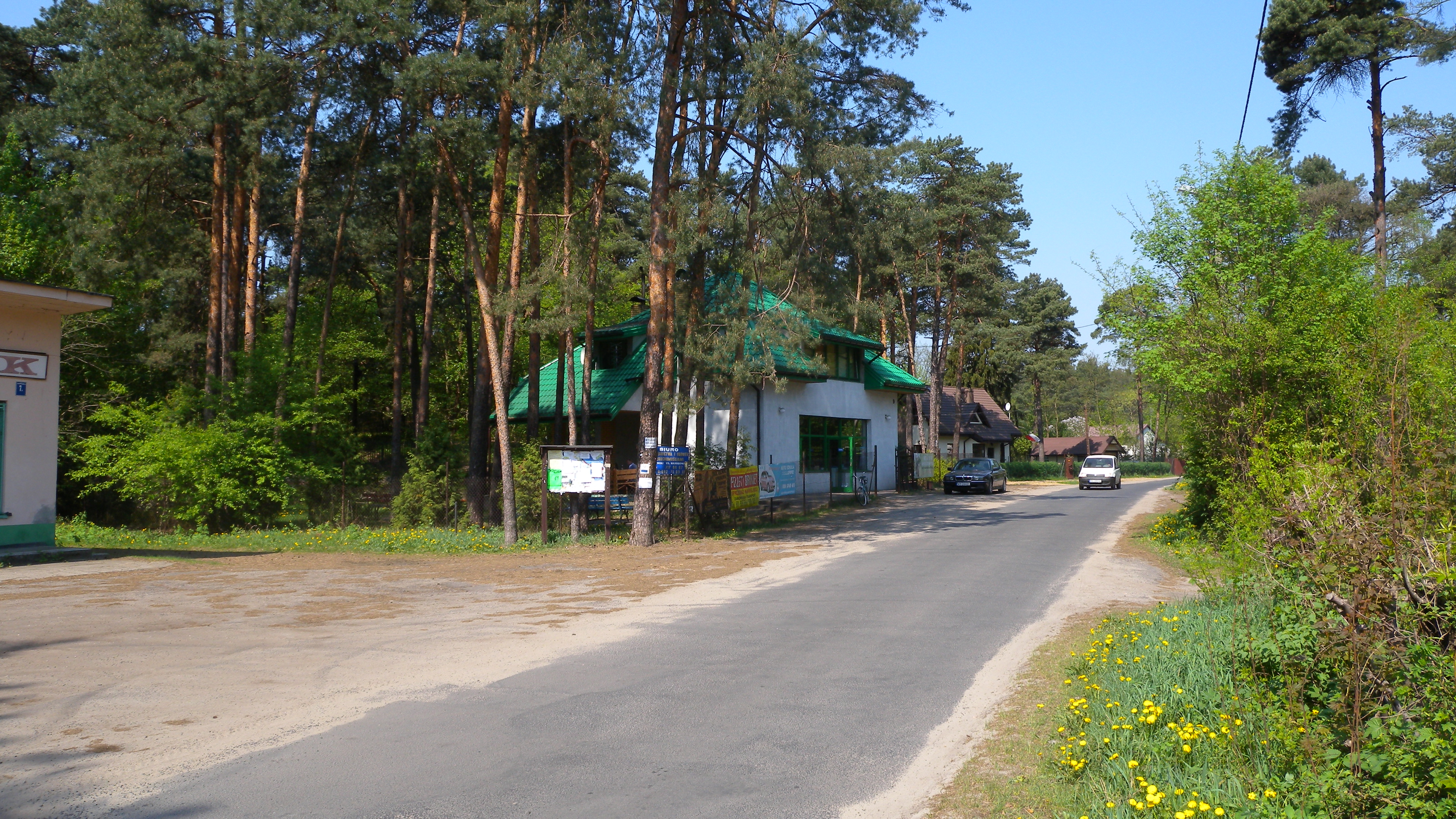

- Location within Poland
- Coordinates: 51°53′28″N 19°18′37″E
- Country: Poland
- Voivodeship: Łódź
- County: Zgierz
- Gmina: Zgierz
- Highest elevation: 188 m (617 ft)
- Lowest elevation: 150 m (490 ft)
- Website: http://www.grotniki.pl

Grotniki [ɡrɔtˈniki] (1943–1945 German Grottensee) is a village in the administrative district of Gmina Zgierz, within Zgierz County, Łódź Voivodeship, in central Poland.
