= Joanna Koroniewska =

Polish actress (born 1978)

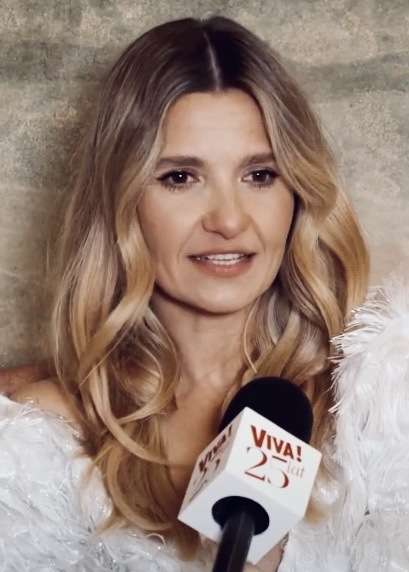
- Joanna Koroniewska in 2022
- Born: 27 May 1978 (age 48); Toruń, Poland
- Occupation: Actress
- Years active: 2000–present

Joanna Koroniewska (born 27 May 1978 in Toruń, Poland) is a Polish film, television and theater actress, best known for playing in the Polish TV series M jak miłość (L as in, Love).

== Career ==
In 2006 she took part in 3rd season popular TV show Taniec z gwiazdami (Dancing with the Stars). Her dance partner was Robert Kochanek. They took third place. From 3 March to 3 April 2010 together with Łukasz Zagrobelny who was her vocal coach, she participated in the 1st season TV show Tylko nas dwoje (Just The Two Of Us). They took 8th place.

== Filmography ==
=== Actress ===
- 2000–2013: M jak miłość (L for Love) as Małgorzata Chodakowska, Mostowiak's daughter
- 2003: Zwierzę powierzchni as Magda
- 2006: Cold Kenya as Magda
- 2008: Niania as herself
- 2010: Daleko od noszy as Attorney Alicja
- 2012: Julia as Patrycja, Janek Janicki's long love
- 2012: Hotel 52 as Diana
- 2013: Komisarz Alex as star

=== Dubbing in Polish ===
- 2005: Herbie: Fully Loaded as Maggie Peyton
- 2006: Barnyard as Daisy
- 2007: Out of Jimmy's Head as Yancy Roberts
- 2009: Janosik. Prawdziwa historia as Barbara
- 2009: Janosik. Prawdziwa historia as Barbara
- 2009: Hannah Montana: The Movie as Lorelai
- 2021: Soul as 22
