= Joanna Jabłczyńska =

Polish actress and singer (born 1985)

- Born: Joanna Natalia Jabłczyńska; 9 December 1985 (age 40); Warsaw, Poland
- Occupations: Actress, singer

Joanna Natalia Jabłczyńska (born 9 December 1985 in Warsaw, Poland) is a Polish actress, singer. lawyer, radca prawny, ambassador of many charity actions (especially for children), initially a presenter of youth programs.

== Education ==
She is a graduate of the Miguel de Cervantes Liceum in Warsaw.

== Discography ==
- Papparapa (2010)

== Filmography ==
- Trzy szalone zera – Ola Obrębska
- Wyrok na Franciszka Kłosa – Józia
- Duża przerwa – Student
- Słoneczna włócznia – Dora Parnel
- Powiedz to, Gabi – Gośka
- Na Wspólnej – Marta Konarska (née Hoffer)
- Nigdy w życiu! – Tosia
- Kto nigdy nie żył... – Marysia
- Tylko mnie kochaj – Waitress
- Nadzieja
- Dlaczego nie! – Moni
- Klan – Sylwia Marczyńska
- Niania – Nicole's manager
- Kryminalni – Ula (episode 98)
- Taniec z gwiazdami – Herself
- Jak oni śpiewają – Herself

== Polish dubbing ==
Video games

- Battlefield 4
- Disciples III: Renaissance – Various voices
- Dragon Age: Origins – Awakening – Sorcha / Additional voices
- Legend: Hand of God – Luna
- Mass Effect 2 – Gabriella Daniels
- Neverwinter Nights 2 – Neeshka
- Scooby-Doo! First Frights – Anna

Movies

- 7 Dwarves – Men Alone in the Wood – Snow White
- A Bug's Life
- A Troll in Central Park – Rosie
- Babar: The Movie – Isabelle
- Barbie Fairytopia: Magic of the Rainbow
- Camp Rock series – Tess Tyler
- Chicken Little
- Dr. Seuss' How the Grinch Stole Christmas – Cindy Lou Who
- Franklin and the Turtle Lake Treasure – Franklin
- Garfield's Fun Fest – Arlene
- Harry Potter and the Philosopher's Stone
- Impy's Island – Wutz
- Lady and the Tramp II: Scamp's Adventure
- Lissi und der wilde Kaiser – Granny
- Monster House – Jenny
- NASCAR 3D: The IMAX Experience – Kim / Additional voices
- Over the Hedge – Heather
- Peter Pan – Wendy
- Planet 51
- Planet Terror – Dakota Block
- Pokémon: The Movie 2000 – Melody
- Return to Never Land Young Wendy
- Sokoliar Tomáš/Król sokołów – Agata
- Spirited Away – Chihiro Ogino
- Spy Kids series – Carmen Cortez
- The Adventures of Sharkboy and Lavagirl in 3-D – Lava
- The Lion King II: Simba's Pride – Young Kiara
- The Little Mermaid II: Return to the Sea – Melody
- The Secret of Moonacre – Maria Merryweather
- The Wild Thornberrys Movie – Eliza Thornberry
- Zathura: A Space Adventure – Lisa

TV series

- 64 Zoo Lane – Lucy
- Avatar: The Last Airbender – Princess Yue
- Babar – Isabelle
- Foeksia de Miniheks – Foeksia
- Girlstuff/Boystuff – Talia
- Goosebumps – Various voices
- Jacob Two-Two – Emma
- ¡Mucha Lucha! – Buena Girl
- PB&J Otter
- Rolie Polie Olie – Zowie Polie (eps 1–39)
- Sabrina: The Animated Series – Sabrina Spellman
- Talespin – Molly Cunningham (2nd voice, 1st Polish dub)
- That's So Raven
- The Little Lulu Show – Lulu
- The Magic School Bus – Wanda Li
