= Renata Dancewicz =

Polish actress

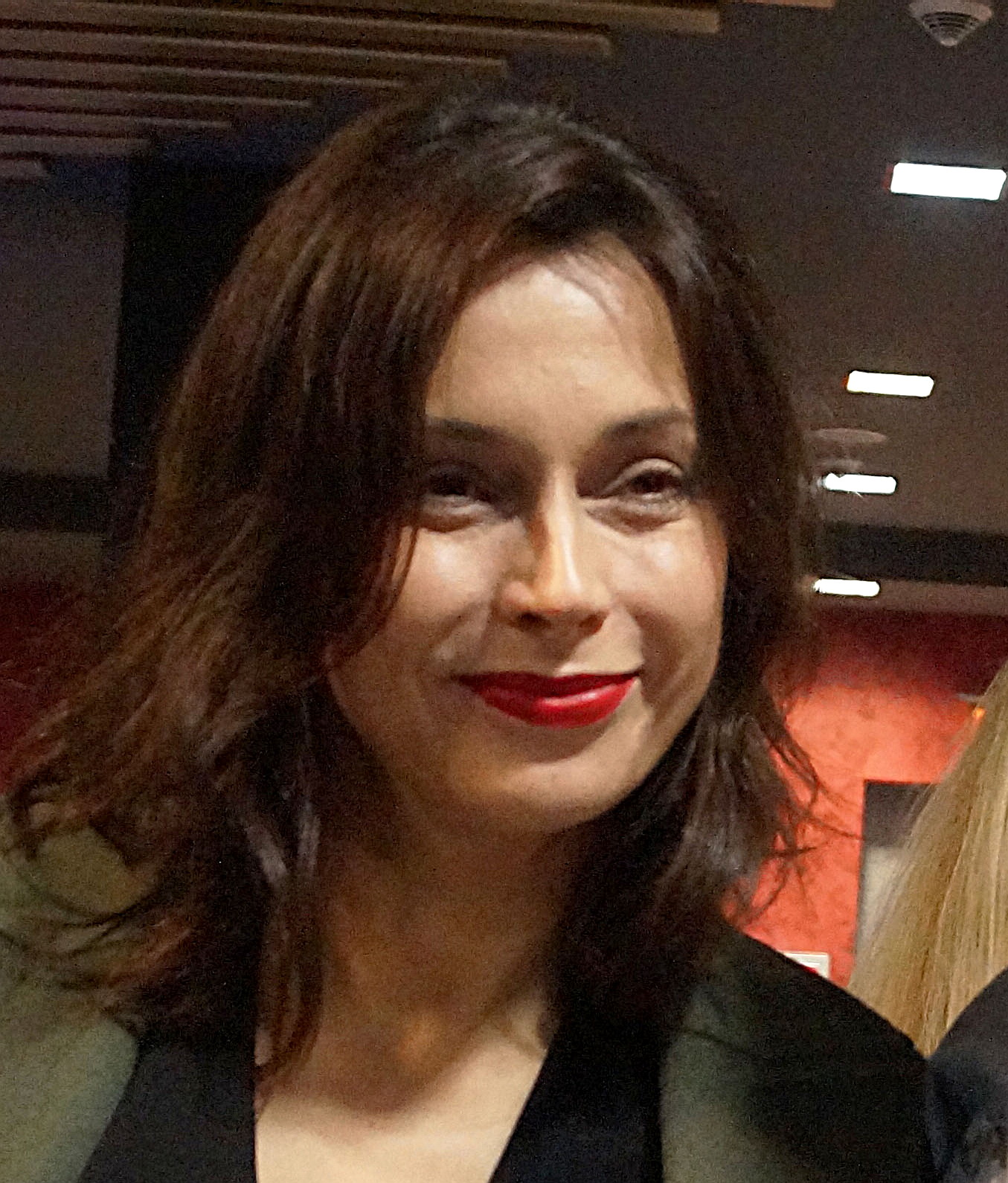
- Renata Dancewicz, 2017
- Born: 7 February 1969 (age 57); Leszno, Poland
- Occupation: Actress
- Years active: since 1991

Renata Dancewicz (born 7 February 1969) is a Polish actress and member of the Polish Bridge Union. In 1988 she graduated from the 1st Mikołaj Kopernik High School in Lubin. In 2006 Dancewicz danced in the Taniec z Gwiazdami (Polish version of the Dancing with the Stars).

She's an atheist and an advocate for women's rights.

== Filmography ==
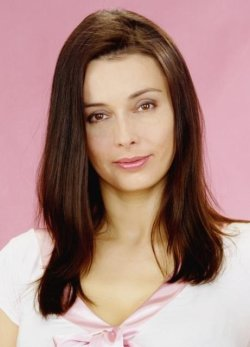
Renata Dancewicz, 2008

- 1993: Do widzenia wczoraj
- 1993: Samowolka (A.W.O.L.)
- 1994: Oczy niebieskie (Blue Eyes)
- 1994: Komedia małżeńska (Matrimonial Comedy)
- 1994-1995: Radio Romans (Radio Romance)
- 1995: Die Schönste Sache der Welt
- 1995: Ekstradycja
- 1995: Diabelska edukacja (Devilish Education)
- 1995: Deborah
- 1995: Pułkownik Kwiatkowski (Colonel Kwiatkowski)
- 1995: Tato
- 1997: Ekstradycja 2
- 1997: Svenska Hjältar (Swedish Heroes)
- 1998: Gniew (Anger)
- 1999: Ekstradycja 3
- 1999: Siedlisko
- 2000: Sukces
- 2002: Eukaliptus
- 2002: E=mc²
- 2003: Zostać miss 2
- 2003-2008: Na Wspólnej
- 2006: Kryminalni
- 2008: 33 Scenes from Life
- 2010: Blecanto
