= Natalia Siwiec =

Polish glamour model (born 1983)

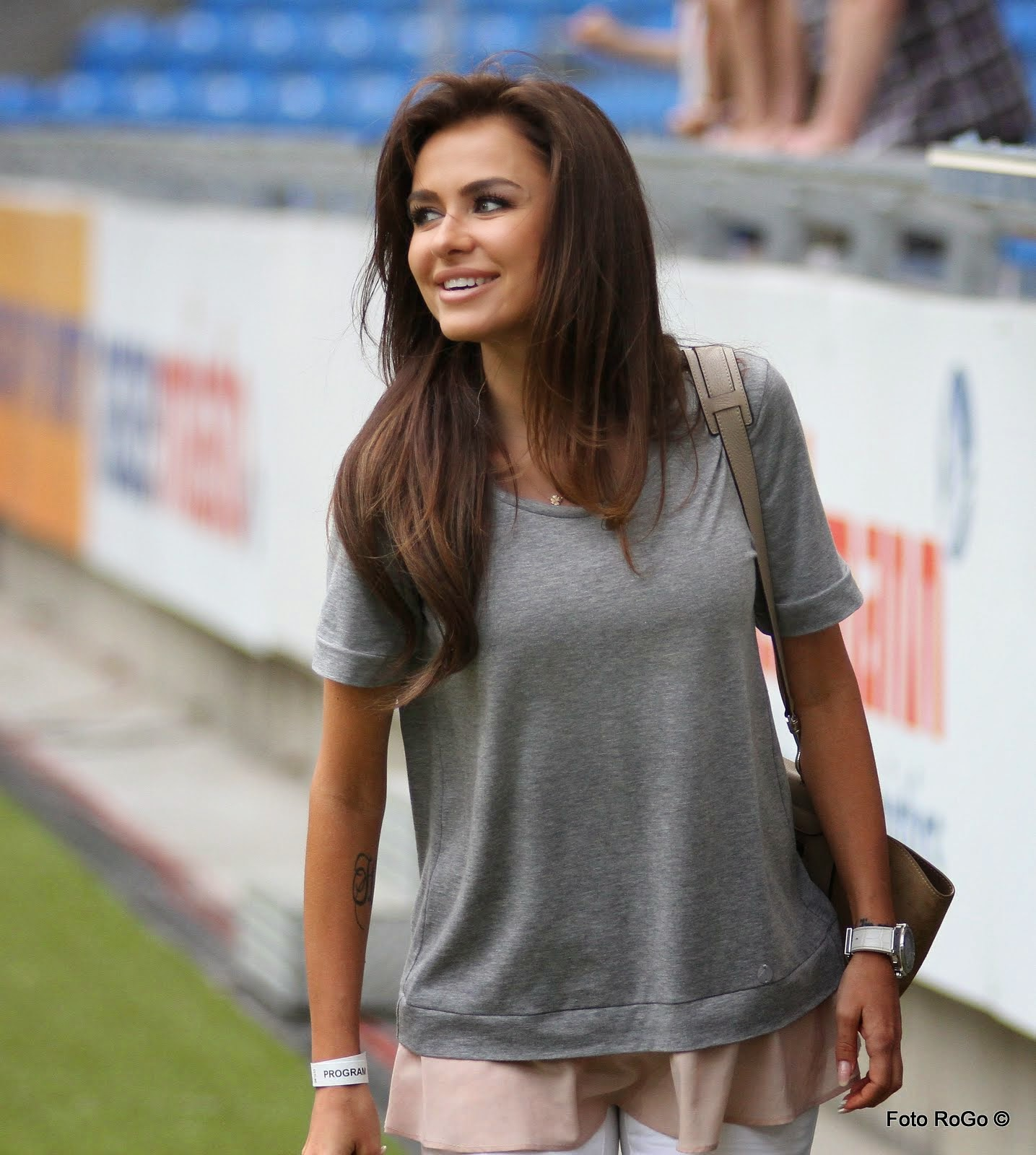
- Born: 1 August 1983 (age 42); Wałbrzych, Poland
- Occupation: Glamour model
- Years active: 2012–present
- Spouse: Mariusz Raduszewski

Natalia Siwiec (born 1 August 1983) is a Polish glamour model. She became widely known after she attended the 2012 UEFA European Football Championship in Warsaw and drew the attention of photographers there. She was subsequently labelled the ‘sexiest’ Polish football fan and ‘Miss Euro 2012’. As a result of this rise to fame she has been dubbed the ‘Polish Larissa Riquelme’. According to Google's annual Zeitgeist Report, Siwiec is one of the most sought after celebrities in Poland.

== Personal life ==
Siwiec married Mariusz Raduszewski in 2012. On 21 August 2017 she gave birth to their daughter Mia.
