= MTV Europe Music Award for Best Polish Act =

Category of MTV Europe Music Awards

The following is a list of the MTV Europe Music Award winners and nominees for Best Polish Act.

== Winners and nominees ==
Winners are listed first and highlighted in bold.

=== 1990s ===
Year	Artist	Ref
1994	**De Mono**^{[a]}	

=== 2000s ===
Year	Artist	Ref
2000
2000	**Kazik**	
2000	Brathanki	
2000	Reni Jusis	
2000	Kayah	
2000	Myslovitz	
2001
2001	**Kasia Kowalska**	
2001	Fiolka	
2001	Reni Jusis	
2001	Myslovitz	
2001	Smolik	
2002
2002	**Myslovitz**	
2002	Blue Café	
2002	Futro	
2002	T.Love	
2002	Wilki	
2003
2003	**Myslovitz**	
2003	Blue Café	
2003	Cool Kids of Death	
2003	Peja	
2003	Smolik	
2004
2004	**Sistars**	
2004	Ania Dabrowska	
2004	Reni Jusis	
2004	Sidney Polak	
2004	Trzeci Wymiar	
2005
2005	**Sistars**	
2005	Abradab	
2005	Monica Brodka	
2005	Sidney Polak	
2005	Zakopower	
2006
2006	**Blog 27**	
2006	Coma	
2006	Hey	
2006	Sistars	
2006	Virgin	
2007
2007	**Doda**	
2007	Monika Brodka	
2007	Ania Dąbrowska	
2007	Kasia Nosowska	
2007	O.S.T.R.	
2008
2008	**Feel**	
2008	Afromental	
2008	Kasia Cerekwicka	
2008	Ania Dabrowska	
2008	Hey	
2009
2009	**Doda**	
2009	Afromental	
2009	Ania Dąbrowska	
2009	Ewa Farna	
2009	Jamal	

=== 2010s ===
Year	Artist	Ref
2010
2010	**Afromental**	
2010	Agnieszka Chylińska	
2010	Hey	
2010	Mrozu	
2010	Tede	
2011
2011	**Ewa Farna**	
2011	Afromental	
2011	Doda	
2011	Monika Brodka	
2011	Myslovitz	
2012
2012	**Monika Brodka**	
2012	Iza Lach	
2012	Mrozu	
2012	Pezet	
2012	The Stubs	
2013
2013	**Bednarek**	
2013	Dawid Podsiadło	
2013	Donatan	
2013	Ewelina Lisowska	
2013	Margaret	
2014
2014	**Dawid Kwiatkowski**	
2014	Grzegorz Hyży	
2014	Artur Rojek	
2014	Mrozu	
2014	Jamal	
2014	Pre-nominations: Dawid Podsiadło; Ewelina Lisowska; Ewa Farna; Honorata Skarbek-Honey	
2015
2015	**Margaret**	
2015	Natalia Nykiel	
2015	Sarsa	
2015	Tabb & Sound'n'Grace	
2015	Tede	
2016
2016	**Margaret**	
2016	Ania Dąbrowska	
2016	Bovska	
2016	Dawid Podsiadło	
2016	Cleo	
2016	Pre-nominations: Natalia Nykiel; Hey; Monika Brodka	
2017
2017	**Dawid Kwiatkowski**	
2017	Kamil Bednarek	
2017	Monika Lewczuk	
2017	Margaret	
2017	Natalia Nykiel	
2018
2018	**Margaret**	
2018	Monika Brodka	
2018	Dawid Podsiadło	
2018	Natalia Nykiel	
2018	Taconafide	
2019
2019	**Roksana Węgiel**	
2019	Bass Astral x Igo	
2019	Daria Zawiałow	
2019	Dawid Podsiadło	
2019	Sarsa	

=== 2020s ===
Year	Artist	Ref
2020
2020	**Margaret**	
2020	Quebonafide	
2020	Krzysztof Zalewski	
2020	Daria Zawiałow	
2020	sanah	
2021
2021	**Daria Zawiałow**	
2021	Brodka	
2021	Krzysztof Zalewski	
2021	Margaret	
2021	sanah	
2022
2022	**Ralph Kaminski**	
2022	Margaret	
2022	Mata	
2022	Young Leosia	
2022	Julia Wieniawa	
2023
2023	**Doda**	
2023	Kasia Nosowska	
2023	Mrozu	
2023	Sanah	
2023	Vito Bambino	
2024
2024	**Daria Zawiałow**	
2024	Kacperczyk	
2024	Kwiat Jabłoni	
2024	PRO8L3M	
2024	Krzysztof Zalewski	

^{^[a]}Local Hero Award — Poland
