= Silver Rocket (band) =

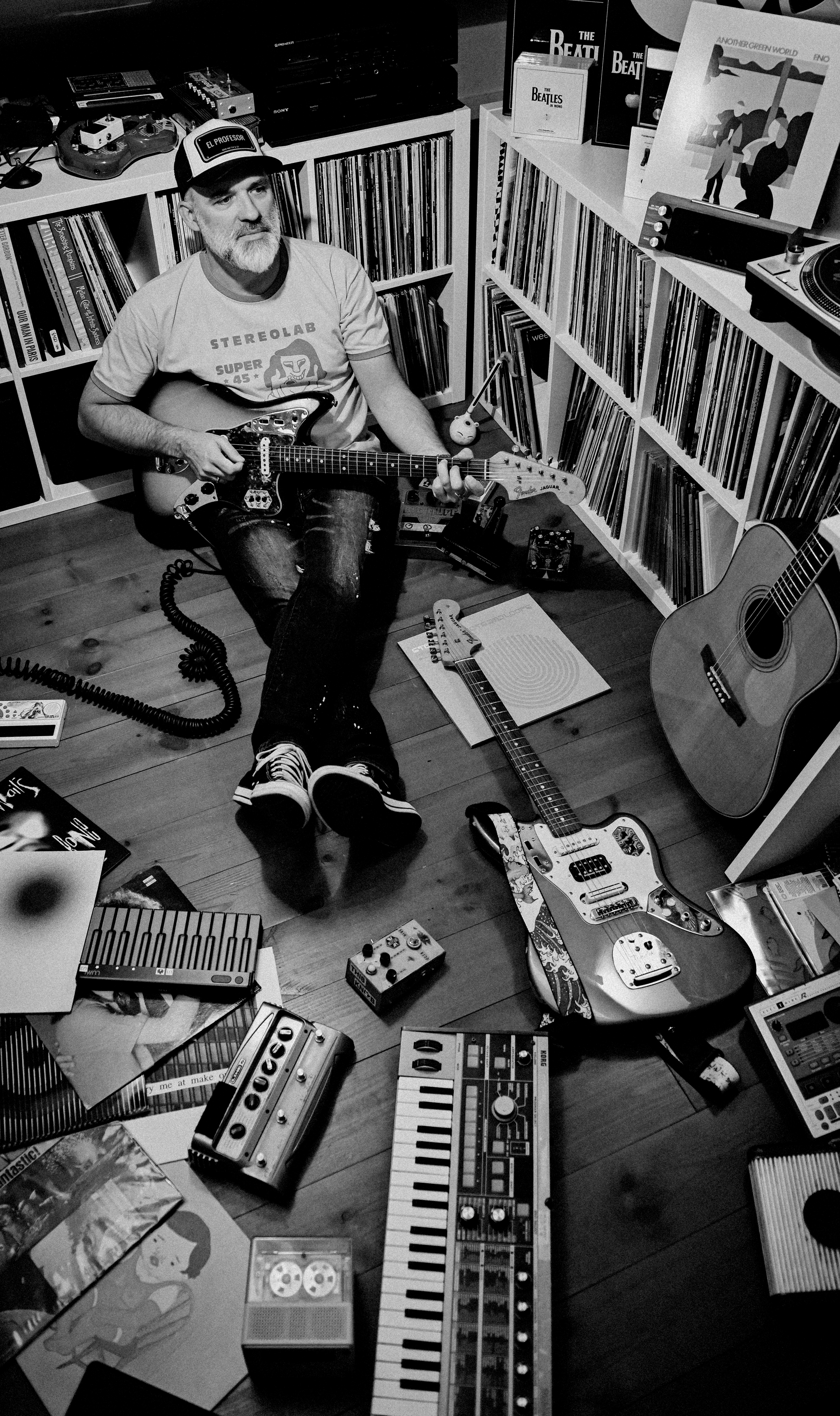

Background information
- Years active: 2001–present
- Labels: Black Element; Ampersand; Revolution 9; Jazzboy Records; Sony BMG Music Entertainment Poland; }
- Website: www.silverrocket.pl

Silver Rocket is a musical project by multi-instrumentalist and producer Mariusz Szypura, known for bands such as Blimp and Happy Pills. The project was initiated in 2001.

== History ==
In 2002, Silver Rocket released its debut album Electronics For Dogs on Ampersand Records. The song "Not Ok. 3000," sung by Aga Morawska of Happy Pills, was awarded "Song of the Year" on the radio show Trójkowy Ekspres.

In 2006, Silver Rocket released their second album, Unhappy Songs, on Jazzboy Records. "Unhappy Songs" consists of 11 tracks featuring elements of both British guitar music and modern electronics. The album featured guest appearances by Kasia Nosowska, Ania Dąbrowska, Artur Rojek, the band Old Time Radio, Tomek Makowiecki, and Karolina Kozak from the band dr.no. The album was promoted by the track "Nothing Is Forever", which involved all the artists participating in the project.

In 2008, Silver Rocket released Tesla, a concept album inspired by the life of Nikola Tesla. Szypura invited various artists to collaborate, including Tomek Makowiecki, Ania Dąbrowska, Monika Brodka, and Marsija from the band Locostar.

In 2024, Silver Rocket released the two-disc album Infinity Fidelity. Both discs can be played simultaneously.

== Discography ==
Studio albums

Title	About album
Electronics For Dogs	Released: 2002; Label: Ampersand
Astronaut's Diary (EP)	Released: 2003; Label: Ampersand
Unhappy Songs	Released: 30 January 2006; Label: Jazzboy Records/Sony BMG
Tesla	Released: 15 September 2008; Label: Revolution 9/Sony BMG
Supermarket OST	Released: 2013; Label: Revolution 9/Sony BMG; film soundtrack
Steampunker OST	Released: 2015; Label: Telehorse; game soundtrack
Steamburg OST	Released: 2017; Label: Telehorse; game soundtrack
Infinity Fidelity	Released: 2024; Label: Black Element/ Warner Music

Singles

Title	Year	On the list	Album
Title	Year	LP3	Album
"Nothing Is Forever" (with Ania Dąbrowska, Karolina Kozak, Katarzyna Nosowska, Artur Rojek and Marsija)	2006	—	Unhappy Songs
"Niagara Falls" (with Monika Brodka)	2008	37	Tesla
„—” the single was not charted.
