= Idol Poland season 1 =

Idol Poland
- Season 1
- Hosted by: Maciej Rock
- Judges: Kuba Wojewódzki; Elżbieta Zapendowska; Jacek Cygan; Robert Leszczyński
- Winner: Alicja Janosz
- Runner-up: Ewelina Flinta
- No. of episodes: 24

Release
- Original network: Polsat
- Original release: April 5 – June 30, 2002

Season chronology
- Next → Season 2

Idol Poland (season 1) was the first season of Idol Poland. It was the first international adaption of the British singing competition Pop Idol and the first show that went by the simple title Idol. It premiered on April 5, 2002, one month after the final of the original series, and lasted for six months until June 30. Alicja Janosz won over Ewelina Flinta and Szymon Wydra and therefore became the first female winner of the Idol series. It was also the first time that two females made it to the grand finale. On Christmas 2003 Janosz would compete with ten other countries Idol winners on World Idol where she eventually placed 8th.
As the show became a runaway success most finalists got signed and next to Janosz her fellow competitors Ewelina Flinta, Szymon Wydra, Tomasz Makowiecki (with Makowicki Band), Patrycja Wódz (with girlgroup Queen) and most notably Anna Dąbrowska were able to established careers on the Polish music market and enjoyed long running success.
Marcin Mroziński, who made it to the semifinals but was eliminated in the wildcard round, went on to establish a musical career before representing Poland in the Eurovision Song Contest in 2010 where he was eliminated in the semifinals.

== Finals ==
=== Finalists ===
Finalist	Age *	From	Status
Jakub Rutnicki	23	Szamotuły	Eliminated 1st in Week 1
Mike Zawitkowski	19	USA	Eliminated 2nd in Week 1
Anna Dąbrowska	21	Chełm	Withdrew in Week 2
Patrycja Wódz	23	Szczecin	Eliminated 3rd in Week 3
Paweł Nowak	16	Gdynia	Eliminated 4th in Week 4
Tomasz Makowiecki	18	Gdynia	Eliminated 5th in Week 5
Małgorzata Stępień	24	Inowrocław	Eliminated 6th in Week 6
Szymon Wydra	26	Radom	Third
Ewelina Flinta	22	Lubsko	Runner-up
Alicja Janosz	17	Pszczyna	Winner

* as of the start of the season

== Heats and live shows ==
=== Elimination Chart ===
Legend
Did Not Perform	Female	Male	Top 48	Wild Card	Top 10	Winner

Safe	Bottom 3	Bottom 2	Eliminated

Stage:		Semi								Wild; Card	Finals						
Week:		05/01	05/07	05/10	05/14	05/17	05/21	05/24	05/28	05/31	06/08	06/09	06/15	06/16	06/22	06/23	06/30
Place	Contestant	Result															
1	Alicja Janosz								Adv						Btm 2		Winner
2	Ewelina Flinta				Adv									Btm 3			Runner-Up
3	Szymon Wydra						Adv								Btm 3		Elim
4	Gosia Stępień	Adv									Btm 3	Btm 3	Btm 2	Btm 2		Elim	
5	Tomasz Makowiecki		Adv										Btm 3		Elim		
6	Paweł Nowak						Elim			Adv				Elim			
7	Patrycja Wódz							Elim		Adv		Btm 2	Elim				
8	Anna Dąbrowska							Adv				Wdrw					
9	Jakub Rutnicki			Adv							Elim						
10	Mike Zawitkowski					Adv					Elim						
Wild; Card	Aleksandra Łysiak					Elim				Elim							
Wild; Card	Anna Jankowska				Elim					Elim							
Wild; Card	Karolina Staromiejska	Elim								Elim							
Wild; Card	Katarzyna Olczyk			Elim						Elim							
Wild; Card	Marcin Mroziński		Elim							Elim							
Wild; Card	Mirosław Skonieczny								Elim	Elim							
Semi- Final 8	Agnieszka Maksyjan								Elim								
Semi- Final 8	Emilia Tarasiewicz								Elim								
Semi- Final 8	Maria Widomska								Elim								
Semi- Final 8	Paweł Niewiadomski								Elim								
Semi- Final 7	Bartłomiej Zdanowicz							Elim									
Semi- Final 7	Beata Wiater							Elim									
Semi- Final 7	Lorena Ganga Neto							Elim									
Semi- Final 7	Piotr Lachendro							Elim									
Semi- Final 6	Bogusława Burzenik						Elim										
Semi- Final 6	Karolina Parzych						Elim										
Semi- Final 6	Marcin Ziółkowski						Elim										
Semi- Final 6	Sylwia Lasok						Elim										
Semi- Final 5	Beata Brodnicka					Elim											
Semi- Final 5	Daniel Basiński					Elim											
Semi- Final 5	Iwona Buła					Elim											
Semi- Final 5	Karolina Serocka					Elim											
Semi- Final 4	Dariusz Dšbrowski				Elim												
Semi- Final 4	Marcin Piórecki				Elim												
Semi- Final 4	Sylwia Pawłowicz				Elim												
Semi- Final 4	Tomasz Łupak				Elim												
Semi- Final 3	Andrzej Zubrzycki			Elim													
Semi- Final 3	Aneta Figiel			Elim													
Semi- Final 3	Ewelina Kapelan			Elim													
Semi- Final 3	Katarzyna Baranowska			Elim													
Semi- Final 2	Agnieszka Kałuża		Elim														
Semi- Final 2	Karolina Sumowska		Elim														
Semi- Final 2	Małgorzata Godlewska		Elim														
Semi- Final 2	Paula Ignasiak		Elim														
Semi- Final 1	Justyna Szymańska	Elim															
Semi- Final 1	Sebastian Chmiel	Elim															
Semi- Final 1	Sławomir Konik	Elim															
Semi- Final 1	Sławomir Lisowski	Elim															

=== Live Show Details ===
==== Heat 1 (1 May 2002) ====
Artist	Song (original artists)	Result
Justyna Szymańska	"Endless Love" (Lionel Richie & Diana Ross)	Eliminated
Karolina Staromiejska	"The Power of Love" (Jennifer Rush)	Eliminated
Gosia Stępień	"The Greatest Love of All" (Whitney Houston)	Advanced
Sebastian Chmiel	"Pogoda ducha" (Hanna Banaszak)	Eliminated
Sławomir Konik	"Tak jak anioł" (Stachursky)	Eliminated
Sławomir Lisowski	"Aicha" ()	Eliminated

==== Heat 2 (7 May 2002) ====
Artist	Song (original artists)	Result
Agnieszka Kałuża	"Kasztany" (Edyta Górniak)	Eliminated
Karolina Sumowska	"Coś optymistycznego" (Kasia Kowalska)	Eliminated
Małgorzata Godlewska	"Ta sama chwila" (Bajm)	Eliminated
Marcin Mroziński	"When I Need You" (Leo Sayer)	Eliminated
Paula Ignasiak	"Stop!" (Sam Brown)	Eliminated
Tomasz Makowiecki	"Heaven" (Bryan Adams)	Advanced

==== Heat 3 (10 May 2002) ====
Artist	Song (original artists)	Result
Andrzej Zubrzycki	"" ()	Eliminated
Aneta Figiel	"" ()	Eliminated
Ewelina Kapelan	"" ()	Eliminated
Jakub Rutnicki	"Wehikuł czasu" (Dżem)	Advanced
Katarzyna Baranowska	"" ()	Eliminated
Katarzyna Olczyk	"" ()	Eliminated

==== Heat 4 (14 May 2002) ====
Artist	Song (original artists)	Result
Anna Jankowska	"" ()	Eliminated
Dariusz Dšbrowski	"" ()	Eliminated
Ewelina Flinta	"Show Me Heaven" (Maria McKee)	Advanced
Marcin Piórecki	"" ()	Eliminated
Sylwia Pawłowicz	"" ()	Eliminated
Tomasz Łupak	"" ()	Eliminated

==== Heat 5 (17 May 2002) ====
Artist	Song (original artists)	Result
Aleksandra Łysiak	"When I'm Down" (Chris Cornell)	Eliminated
Beata Brodnicka	"I'm Outta Love" (Anastacia)	Eliminated
Daniel Basiński	"Against All Odds (Take a Look at Me Now)" (Phil Collins)	Eliminated
Iwona Buła	"Fallin'" (Alicia Keys)	Eliminated
Karolina Serocka	"Rękawiczki" ()	Eliminated
Mike Zawitkowski	"Drops of Jupiter (Tell Me)" (Train)	Advanced

==== Heat 6 (21 May 2002) ====
Artist	Song (original artists)	Result
Bogusława Burzenik	"Dziś prawdziwych cyganów" ()	Eliminated
Karolina Parzych	"Supermanka" ()	Eliminated
Marcin Ziółkowski	"Nie chcę więcej" (Michał Bajor)	Eliminated
Paweł Nowak	"Imię deszczu" (Mafia)	Eliminated
Sylwia Lasok	"We Are Family" (Sister Sledge)	Eliminated
Szymon Wydra	"Wszystkie chwile" (Magma)	Advanced

==== Heat 7 (24 May 2002) ====
Artist	Song (original artists)	Result
Anna Dąbrowska	"I Believe in You and Me" (Whitney Houston)	Advanced
Bartłomiej Zdanowicz	"Głowa do góry" ()	Eliminated
Beata Wiater	"Too Much Love Will Kill You" (Queen)	Eliminated
Lorena Ganga Neto	"Un-Break My Heart" (Toni Braxton)	Eliminated
Patrycja Wódz	"You're the One That I Want" (John Travolta & Olivia Newton-John)	Eliminated
Piotr Lachendro	"Kissing a Fool" (George Michael)	Eliminated

==== Heat 8 (28 May 2002) ====
Artist	Song (original artists)	Result
Agnieszka Maksyjan	"Wszystko czego dziś chcę" ()	Eliminated
Alicja Janosz	"I'm Outta Love" (Anastacia)	Advanced
Emilia Tarasiewicz	"Wznieś serce nad zło" ()	Eliminated
Maria Widomska	"Brzydcy" ()	Eliminated
Mirosław Skonieczny	"Eli lama sabachtani" ()	Eliminated
Paweł Niewiadomski	"Chcę znać swój grzech" (Kasia Kowalska)	Eliminated

==== Live Show 1 (31 May 2002) ====
Theme: My Idol

Artist	Song (original artists)	Result
Alicja Janosz	"From Sarah with Love" (Sarah Connor)	Safe
Anna Dąbrowska	"Can't Run Away" (Kelly Price)	Safe
Ewelina Flinta	"The Best" (Tina Turner)	Safe
Jakub Rutnicki	"Kocham cię jak Irlandię" (Kobranocka)	Eliminated
Gosia Stępień	"Watch My Back" (Aretha Franklin)	Bottom three
Mike Zawitkowski	"Fly Away" (Lenny Kravitz)	Eliminated
Patrycja Wódz	"Man! I Feel Like a Woman!" (Shania Twain)	Safe
Paweł Nowak	"Ta sama chwila" (Bajm)	Safe
Szymon Wydra	"Kiedy wołam wiatr wołam ciebie" (Grzegorz Markowski)	Safe
Tomasz Makowiecki	"Son of the Blue Sky" (Wilki)	Safe

==== Live Show 2 (9 June 2002) ====
Theme: Disco Fever

Artist	Song (original artists)	Result
Alicja Janosz	"One Way Ticket" (Eruption)	Safe
Anna Dąbrowska	"Y.M.C.A." (Village People)	Withdrew
Ewelina Flinta	"I Will Survive" (Gloria Gaynor)	Safe
Gosia Stępień	"September" (Earth, Wind & Fire)	Bottom three
Patrycja Wódz	"Kung Fu Fighting" (Carl Douglas)	Bottom two
Paweł Nowak	"Kung Fu Fighting" (Carl Douglas)	Safe
Szymon Wydra	"Da Ya Think I'm Sexy?" (Rod Stewart)	Safe
Tomasz Makowiecki	"You Sexy Thing" (Hot Chocolate)	Safe

==== Live Show 3 (15 June 2002) ====
Theme: Rock

Artist	Song (original artists)	Result
Alicja Janosz	"Chcemy być sobą" (Perfect)	Safe
Ewelina Flinta	"Szklana pogoda" (Lombard)	Safe
Gosia Stępień	"Kryzysowa Narzeczona" (Lady Pank)	Bottom two
Patrycja Wódz	"Andzia" (Oddział Zamknięty)	Eliminated
Paweł Nowak	"Mała Lady Pank" (Lady Pank)	Safe
Szymon Wydra	"Nie płacz ewka" (Perfect)	Safe
Tomasz Makowiecki	"Party" (Oddział Zamknięty)	Bottom three

==== Live Show 4 (16 June 2002) ====
Theme: Hits

Artist	Song (original artists)	Result
Alicja Janosz	"Sweet Dreams (Are Made of This)" (Eurythmics)	Safe
Ewelina Flinta	"Walking in Memphis" (Marc Cohn)	Bottom three
Gosia Stępień	"Star People" (George Michael)	Bottom two
Paweł Nowak	"Orla Cien" (Varius Manx)	Eliminated
Szymon Wydra	"Zegar" (Edyta Bartosiewicz)	Safe
Tomasz Makowiecki	"Dla Ciebie" (Myslovitz)	Safe

==== Live Show 5 (22 June 2002) ====
Theme: Musicals

Artist	Song (original artists)	Result
Alicja Janosz	"I Don't Know How to Love Him" (Jesus Christ Superstar)	Bottom two
Ewelina Flinta	"Aquarius" (Hair)	Safe
Gosia Stępień	"Easy to Be Hard" (Hair)	Safe
Szymon Wydra	"Gdybym byl bogaczem" (Fiddler on the Roof)	Bottom three
Tomasz Makowiecki	"How Deep Is Your Love" (Saturday Night Fever)	Eliminated

==== Live Show 6: Semi-final (23 June 2002) ====
Theme: Songs with Soul

Artist	First song (original artists)	Second song	Result
Alicja Janosz	"Skłamałam" (Edyta Bartosiewicz)	"Bo we mnie jest seks" (Kalina Jędrusik)	Safe
Ewelina Flinta	"Małe tęsknoty" (Krystyna Prońko)	"Dziwny jest ten świat" (Czesław Niemen)	Safe
Gosia Stępień	"Poranne łzy" (Krystyna Prońko)	"Niech żyje bal" (Maryla Rodowicz)	Eliminated
Szymon Wydra	"Czas nas uczy pogody" (Grażyna Łobaszewska)	"Wymyśliłem ciebie" (Andrzej Zaucha)	Safe

==== Live final (30 June 2002) ====
Artist	First song	Second song	Result
Alicja Janosz	"Może się wydawać"	"One Day in Your Life"	Winner
Ewelina Flinta	"Może się wydawać"	"We Don't Need Another Hero"	Runner-up
Szymon Wydra	"Może się wydawać"	"Tak tak to ja"	Third place
