= Idol Poland season 2 =

Idol Poland
- Season 2
- Hosted by: Maciej Rock
- Judges: Kuba Wojewódzki; Elżbieta Zapendowska; Jacek Cygan; Robert Leszczyński
- Winner: Krzysztof Zalewski
- Runner-up: Mariusz Totoszko
- No. of episodes: 25

Release
- Original network: Polsat
- Original release: October 7, 2002 – February 16, 2003

Season chronology
- ← Previous; Season 1 Next → Season 3

Idol Poland (season 2) was the second season of Idol Poland. Krzysztof Zalewski won over Mariusz Totoszko and Bartek Hom.

== Finals ==
=== Finalists ===
(ages stated at time of contest)

Contestant	Age	Hometown	Voted Off	Liveshow Theme
Krzysztof Zalewski	18	Lublin	Winner	Grand Finale
Mariusz Totoszko	27	Wschowa	February 16, 2003	Grand Finale
Bartek Hom	23	Szczecin	February 16, 2003	Grand Finale
Marta Smuk	22	Głogów	January 19, 2003; February 9, 2003	Top 40 Hits
Gosia Kunc	16	Radomia	February 2, 2003	20s and 30s
Hanna Stach	21	Katowice	Withdrew	Rock 'N' Roll
Agnieszka Szewczyk	21	Belsk Duży	January 26, 2003	Movies
Damian Aleksander	26	Żagań	January 12, 2003	Disco & Soul
Bartosz Król	24	Warsaw	December 15, 2002	Rock, Reggae & Blues
Magda Rejtczak	19	Siedlce	December 8, 2002	My Idol

=== Live Show Details ===
==== Heat 1 (4 November 2002) ====
Artist	Song (original artists)	Result
Agnieszka Buła	"Róża" (Kayah)	Eliminated
Joanna Konecka	"Dream a Little Dream of Me" (Mama Cass)	Eliminated
Karol Kosior	"Zostawcie Titanica" ()	Eliminated
Krzysztof Zalewski	"Smoke on the Water" (Deep Purple)	Advanced
Marcin Jajkiewicz	"Always" ()	Eliminated
Ola Zembroń	"Turn the Beat Around" (Vicki Sue Robinson)	Eliminated

Notes

- Krzysztof Zalewski advanced to the top 10 of the competition. The other 5 contestants were eliminated.
- Agnieszka Buła returned for a second chance at the top 10 in the Wildcard Round.

==== Heat 2 (8 November 2002) ====
Artist	Song (original artists)	Result
Agnieszka Zawidzka	"When a Man Loves a Woman" (Percy Sledge)	Eliminated
Hanna Stach	"End of the Road" (Boyz II Men)	Advanced
Małgosia Stacha	"Still Got the Blues (For You)" (Gary Moore)	Eliminated
Paulina Sykut	"Jdenym szeptem" ()	Eliminated
Piotr Wachąlski	"Wznieś serce nad zło" (Ryszard Rynkowski)	Eliminated
Przemek Zubowicz	"The One" (Elton John)	Eliminated

Notes

- Hanna Stach advanced to the top 10 of the competition. The other 5 contestants were eliminated.
- Paulina Sykut returned for a second chance at the top 10 in the Wildcard Round.

==== Heat 3 (12 November 2002) ====
Artist	Song (original artists)	Result
Agnieszka Szewczyk	"Stand by Me" (Ben E. King)	Advanced
Karina Kalczyńska	"There You'll Be" (Faith Hill)	Eliminated
Krzysztof Guzowski	"I Don't Like Mondays" (The Boomtown Rats)	Eliminated
Marcin Patyk	"Ashes to Ashes" (Faith No More)	Eliminated
Marcin Wortmann	"Just Once" (James Ingram)	Eliminated
Weronika Sańczyk	"Modlitwa III - Pozwól mi" (Dżem)	Eliminated

Notes

- Agnieszka Szewczyk advanced to the top 10 of the competition. The other 5 contestants were eliminated.
- Karina Kalczyńska and Marcin Patyk returned for a second chance at the top 10 in the Wildcard Round.

==== Heat 4 (15 November 2002) ====
Artist	Song (original artists)	Result
Agnieszka Skarżyńska	"Total Eclipse of the Heart" (Bonnie Tyler)	Eliminated
Bartek Hom	"Powiedz" (Ich Troje)	Eliminated
Bartosz Król	"You Can Leave Your Hat On" (Joe Cocker)	Advanced
Katarzyna Mirowska	"We'll Be Together" (Sting)	Eliminated
Kamil Jagiełło	"Kroplą deszczu" ()	Eliminated
Marzena Korzonek	"Hot Stuff" (Donna Summer)	Eliminated

Notes

- Bartosz Król advanced to the top 10 of the competition. The other 5 contestants were eliminated.
- Bartek Hom and Katarzyna Mirowska returned for a second chance at the top 10 in the Wildcard Round.

==== Heat 5 (18 November 2002) ====
Artist	Song (original artists)	Result
Joanna Kulig	"Pogoda ducha" (Hanna Banaszak)	Eliminated
Kinga Miśkiewicz	"Kocham cię życie" ()	Eliminated
Leszek Stanek	"Hold On" ()	Eliminated
Marcin Piórecki	"Sen o Victorii" (Dżem)	Eliminated
Marcin Wrona	"When a Man Loves a Woman" (Percy Sledge)	Eliminated
Marta Smuk	"Get Here" (Oleta Adams)	Advanced

Notes

- Marta Smuk advanced to the top 10 of the competition. The other 5 contestants were eliminated.
- Joanna Kulig returned for a second chance at the top 10 in the Wildcard Round.

==== Heat 6 (22 November 2002) ====
Artist	Song (original artists)	Result
Andrzej Rakoczy	"Corazón Espinado" (Santana)	Eliminated
Jakub Kęsy	"Easy" (Commodores)	Eliminated
Joanna Kaczyńska	"I Will Always Love You" (Whitney Houston)	Eliminated
Kaja Kaźmierczyk	"(You Make Me Feel Like) A Natural Woman" (Aretha Franklin)	Eliminated
Karolina Pawlak	"Don't Speak" (No Doubt)	Eliminated
Mariusz Totoszko	"Never Tear Us Apart" (INXS)	Advanced

Notes

- Mariusz Totoszko advanced to the top 10 of the competition. The other 5 contestants were eliminated.
- Kaja Kaźmierczyk returned for a second chance at the top 10 in the Wildcard Round.

==== Heat 7 (25 November 2002) ====
Artist	Song (original artists)	Result
Beata Guzikiewicz	"You'll Never Be Alone" (Anastacia)	Eliminated
Damian Aleksander	"Wiem, że odeszłaś" (Czesław Niemen)	Eliminated
Darya Sergiyenko	"I'm Outta Love" (Anastacia)	Eliminated
Gosia Kunc	"Little Wing" (Jimi Hendrix)	Advanced
Miłosz Chodyniecki	"Iris" (Goo Goo Dolls)	Eliminated
Weronika Korthals	"Strong Enough" (Cher)	Eliminated

Notes

- Gosia Kunc advanced to the top 10 of the competition. The other 5 contestants were eliminated.
- Damian Aleksander returned for a second chance at the top 10 in the Wildcard Round.

==== Heat 8 (29 November 2002) ====
Artist	Song (original artists)	Result
Joanna Kościanska	"Lover of Mine" (Alannah Myles)	Eliminated
Łukasz Zagrobelny	"Have You Ever Really Loved a Woman?" (Bryan Adams)	Eliminated
Magda Rejtczak	"Kozmic Blues" (Janis Joplin)	Advanced
Magda Skrabalak	"Think" ()	Eliminated
Sara Mannei	"Strong Enough" ()	Eliminated
Sławek Bieniek	"Father Figure" (George Michael)	Eliminated

Notes

- Magda Rejtczak advanced to the top 10 of the competition. The other 5 contestants were eliminated.
- Łukasz Zagrobelny returned for a second chance at the top 10 in the Wildcard Round.

==== Wildcard round (2 December 2002) ====
Artist	Song (original artists)	Result
Agnieszka Buła	"Róża" (Kayah)	Eliminated
Bartek Hom	"Powiedz" (Ich Troje)	Advanced
Damian Aleksander	"Wiem, że odeszłaś" (Czesław Niemen)	Advanced
Joanna Kulig	"Pogoda ducha" (Hanna Banaszak)	Eliminated
Kaja Kaźmierczyk	"(You Make Me Feel Like) A Natural Woman" (Aretha Franklin)	Eliminated
Karina Kalczyńska	"There You'll Be" (Faith Hill)	Eliminated
Katarzyna Mirowska	"We'll Be Together" (Sting)	Eliminated
Łukasz Zagrobelny	"Have You Ever Really Loved a Woman?" (Bryan Adams)	Eliminated
Marcin Patyk	"Ashes to Ashes" (Faith No More)	Eliminated
Paulina Sykut	"Jdenym szeptem" ()	Eliminated

Notes

- Damian Aleksander and Bartek Hom received the most votes, and completed the top 10.

==== Live Show 1 (8 December 2002) ====
Theme: My Idol

Artist	Song (original artists)	Result
Agnieszka Szewczyk	"Do Something" (Macy Gray)	Safe
Bartek Hom	"Tango kat" (Kabaret Starszych Panów)	Bottom two
Bartosz Król	"Born to Be Wild" (Steppenwolf)	Safe
Damian Aleksander	"Perdono" (Tiziano Ferro)	Safe
Gosia Kunc	"As" (Stevie Wonder)	Safe
Hanna Stach	"Queen of the Night" (Whitney Houston)	Safe
Krzysztof Zalewski	"Wasting Love" (Iron Maiden)	Safe
Magda Rejtczak	"Can't Take My Eyes Off You" (Frankie Valli)	Eliminated
Mariusz Totoszko	"Run to You" (Bryan Adams)	Safe
Marta Smuk	"Lady Marmalade" (Christina Aguilera, Pink, Lil' Kim & Mýa)	Safe

==== Live Show 2 (15 December 2002) ====
Theme: Rock, Reggae & Blues

Artist	Song (original artists)	Result
Agnieszka Szewczyk	"Nim stanie się tak" (Voo Voo)	Safe
Bartek Hom	"Helikopter" (Golden Life)	Safe
Bartosz Król	"Layla" (Derek and the Dominos)	Eliminated
Damian Aleksander	"Sece jak ogień" (Daab)	Bottom two
Gosia Kunc	"Two Princes" (Spin Doctors)	Safe
Hanna Stach	"I Want to Know What Love Is" (Foreigner)	Safe
Krzysztof Zalewski	"Czerwony jak cegła" (Dżem)	Safe
Mariusz Totoszko	"Ale wkoło jest wesoło" (Perfect)	Safe
Marta Smuk	"Georgia on My Mind" (Ray Charles)	Safe

==== Live Show 3 (12 January 2003) ====
Theme: Disco & Soul

Artist	Song (original artists)	Result
Agnieszka Szewczyk	"Moving On Up" (M People)	Safe
Bartek Hom	"Jeszcze bliżej" (Piasek)	Safe
Damian Aleksander	"Na językach" (Kayah)	Eliminated
Gosia Kunc	"Nic o mnie nie wiecie" (Reni Jusis)	Safe
Hanna Stach	"You Are the Universe" (Brand New Heavies)	Safe
Krzysztof Zalewski	"Hot Stuff" (Donna Summer)	Safe
Mariusz Totoszko	"Joanna" (Kool & the Gang)	Safe
Marta Smuk	"Always There" (Incognito)	Bottom two

==== Live Show 4 (19 January 2003) ====
Theme: Movies

Artist	Song (original artists)	Result
Agnieszka Szewczyk	"GoldenEye" (Tina Turner)	Safe
Bartek Hom	"My Heart Will Go On" (Celine Dion)	Bottom two
Gosia Kunc	"Calling You" (Jevetta Steele)	Safe
Hanna Stach	"Flashdance... What a Feeling" (Irene Cara)	Safe
Krzysztof Zalewski	"A Hard Day's Night" (The Beatles)	Safe
Mariusz Totoszko	"Raindrops Keep Fallin' on My Head" (B. J. Thomas)	Safe
Marta Smuk	"It's Raining Men" (The Weather Girls)	Eliminated

==== Live Show 5 (26 January 2003) ====
Theme: Rock 'N' Roll

Artist	Song (original artists)	Result
Agnieszka Szewczyk	"Good Golly, Miss Molly" (Little Richard)	Eliminated
Bartek Hom	"Au Shalalala" (Ireneusz Dudek)	Safe
Gosia Kunc	"Hound Dog" (Elvis Presley)	Safe
Hanna Stach	"Johnny B. Goode" (Chuck Berry)	Bottom two
Krzysztof Zalewski	"Jailhouse Rock" (Elvis Presley)	Safe
Mariusz Totoszko	"Back in the U.S.S.R." (The Beatles)	Safe

==== Live Show 6 (2 February 2003) ====
Theme: 20s & 30s

Artist	Song (original artists)	Result
Hanna Stach	N/A	Withdrew
Bartek Hom	"Sex Appeal" (Eugeniusz Bodo)	Bottom two
Gosia Kunc	"Na pierwszy znak" (Hanka Ordonówna)	Eliminated
Krzysztof Zalewski	"Umówiłem się z nią na dziewiątą" (Eugeniusz Bodo)	Safe
Mariusz Totoszko	"Już taki jestem zimny drań" (Mieczysław Fogg)	Safe
Marta Smuk	"Miłość ci wszystko wybaczy" (Hanka Ordonówna)	Safe

==== Live Show 7: Semi-final (9 February 2003) ====
Theme: Top 40 Hits

Artist	First song (original artists)	Second song	Result
Bartek Hom	"Niepokonani" (Perfect)	"O nic nie pytaj" (Yugoton)	Safe
Krzysztof Zalewski	"Everyday" (Bon Jovi)	"Urke" (Wilki)	Safe
Mariusz Totoszko	"Electrical Storm" (U2)	"Feel" (Robbie Williams)	Bottom two
Marta Smuk	"A Woman's Worth" (Alicia Keys)	"Lepszy model" (Katarzyna Klich)	Eliminated

==== Live final (16 February 2003) ====
Artist	First song	Second song	Result
Bartek Hom	"Czy"	"Śpiewać każdy może"	Eliminated
Krzysztof Zalewski	"Czy"	"Jeremy"	Winner
Mariusz Totoszko	"Czy"	"The Show Must Go On"	Runner-up
