= Sony BMG Music Entertainment Poland =

- Parent company: Sony BMG Music Entertainment
- Founded: 2004
- Defunct: 2008
- Genre: various
- Country of origin: Warsaw, Poland
- Location: Poland

Sony BMG Music Entertainment Poland Sp. z o.o., was a Polish subsidiary of Sony BMG Music Entertainment. Label was founded in 2004 after BMG Poland merged with Sony Music Entertainment Poland. In 2008 after BMG was brought by Sony Music corporation Polish label returned to the previous name Sony Music Entertainment Poland.

== Selected artists ==
- Andrzej Piaseczny
- Ania
- Big Cyc
- Coma
- Cool Kids of Death
- Ewelina Flinta
- Hey
- Kasia Cerekwicka
- Kayah
- Lady Pank
- Maciej Silski
- Makowiecki Band
- Marcin Rozynek
- Maria Sadowska
- Maryla Rodowicz
- Mietall Waluś
- Monika Brodka
- Myslovitz
- Nefer
- Renata Przemyk

== See also ==
- EMI Music Poland
- PolyGram Poland
- Universal Music Poland
- Warner Music Poland
