= Kasia Cerekwicka =

Polish pop singer

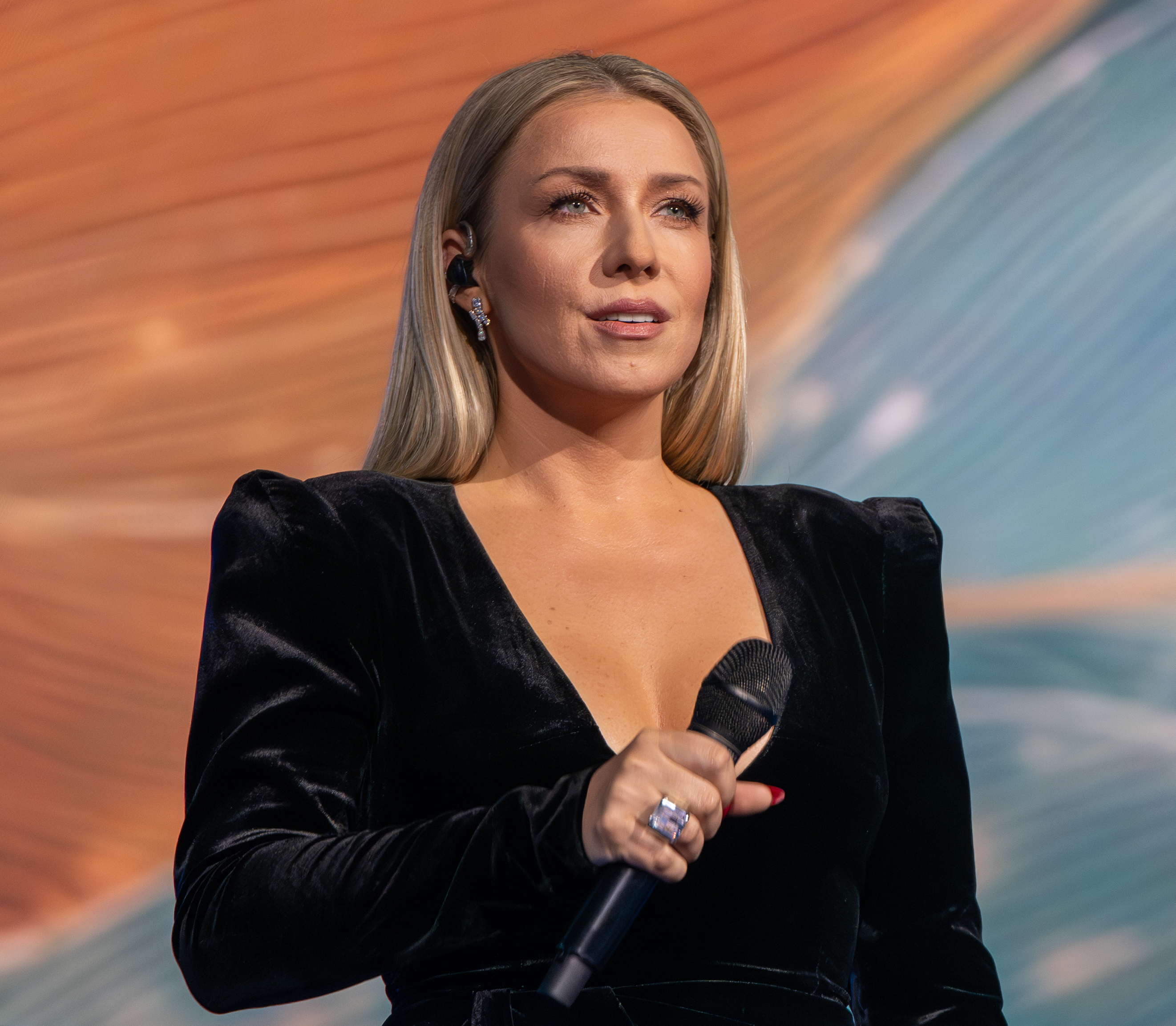
- Photo from a live performance in 2025.

Background information
- Born: Katarzyna Cerekwicka; 17 March 1980 (age 46)
- Origin: Koszalin, Poland
- Genres: Pop, R&B, Soul
- Years active: 1997–present
- Labels: BMG Poland, Sony BMG Music Entertainment Poland, Sony Music Entertainment Poland
- Website: www.kasiacerekwicka.com.pl

Katarzyna "Kasia" Cerekwicka (born 17 March 1980) is a Polish pop singer. She has been singing since she was a little girl. In 1997, at the age of 17, she won the popular Polish show Szansa na sukces ("Chance for Success").

== Career ==
She has recorded four albums. The first was Mozaika from 2000. In 2007 Kasia admitted she does not like Mozaika and is not surprised that it wasn't popular in Poland. Her next album was Feniks ("Fenix"). In 2006 participated with Her song "Na kolana" ("On your Knees") in the Piosenka dla Europy 2006 to the Eurovision Song Contest 2006 in which she ended 1st in a draw with Ich Troje but according to rules the group was sent to represent Poland due to higher televoting score and they ended 11th in the semi-final, but for Kasia, her song became a hit of the year in Poland and some other parts of Europe. "Ostatnia Szansa" ("Last Chance") was her second single from Feniks reaching No. 1 on MTV Poland. She released "Potrafię kochać" ("I can love") as her third single.

Kasia Cerekwicka's second album Feniks catapulted her career to superstar status. While her two big hits "Na Kolana" and "Potrafię kochać" were hummed throughout Poland, her studio album quickly achieved prestigious platinum status. She won the Superjedynka Award for the Record of The Year and 2006 Opole Festival and next won the Karlshamn Baltic Festival 2006 award in Sweden on 22 July with her song "Na Kolana".

She took part in Taniec z Gwiazdami (Dancing with the Stars) on TVN, placing 4th place (episode 7) out of ten stars. Her latest single "S.O.S" gained popularity on all radio stations and was a candidate to represent Poland in the Sopot International Song Festival 2007 but did not win.

On 8 October 2007 Cerekwicka released her third new album Pokój 203 ("Room 203"). The second single (after "S.O.S.") was a song called "Zostań" ("Stay").

Kasia decided to participate again in the Sopot International Song Festival 2008 with the song "Nie Ma Nic" and just obtained a 4th place in the competition.

After having various No. 1 videos on MTV Poland, she was nominated to Best Polish Act in the MTV Europe Music Awards 2008 alongside Afromental, Hey, Ania Dabrowska but they lost to Feel which proceed to the next round for choosing Best European Act.

From March to May 2015, she took part in the third season of Polish TV programme Twoja twarz brzmi znajomo, where she came sixth. There, among others, she performed as Mariah Carey, Michael Bolton, Annie Lennox from Eurythmics, Lauryn Hill from The Fugees or Adele.

Apart from being a singer, Cerekwicka works as a therapist.

== Discography ==
=== Studio albums ===
Title	Album details	Peak chart positions	Sales	Certifications
Title	Album details	POL	Sales	Certifications
Mozaika	Released: 30 October 2000; Label: BMG Poland; Formats: CD	—		
Feniks	Released: 20 February 2006; Label: Sony BMG Poland; Formats: CD, digital download	7	POL: 15,000+	POL: Gold
Pokój 203	Released: 8 October 2007; Label: Sony BMG Poland; Formats: CD, digital download	6	POL: 15,000+	POL: Gold
Fe-Male	Released: 31 May 2010; Label: Sony Music Poland; Formats: CD, digital download	11		
"—" denotes a recording that did not chart or was not released in that territory.

=== Music videos ===
Title	Year	Directed	Album	Ref.
"Ostatnia szansa"	2006	Kuba Łubniewski	Feniks	
"Potrafię kochać"	2006	Iza Poniatowska	Feniks	
"Na kolana"	2006	Mariusz Palej	Feniks	
"S.O.S."	2007	—	Pokój 203	
"Zostań"	2007	—	Pokój 203	
"Nie ma nic"	2008	—	non-album single	
"Książe"	2010	Jacek Kościuszko	Fe-Male	
"Wszystko czego chce od ciebie"	2011	Iza Poniatowska	Fe-Male	
