= Tomasz Makowiecki =

Polish musician, singer and songwriter (born 1983)

- Born: June 10, 1983 (age 43); Gdynia, Poland
- Occupations: Musician, singer
- Spouse: Reni Jusis (m. 2008, d. 2019)
- Children: 2 (1 daughter, 1 son)
- Parent(s): Lech Makowiecki; Bożena Makowiecka
- Musical career
- Genres: Pop, rock
- Instrument: Guitar
- Years active: 2002–present
- Labels: BMG Poland, Sony BMG Music Entertainment Poland, Sony Music Entertainment Poland
- Website: makowiecki.pl

Tomasz Makowiecki (born 10 June 1983, in Gdynia) is a Polish musician, singer and songwriter.

== History ==
=== Idol and Makowiecki Band (2002–2005) ===
Makowiecki became popular in 2002 as one of the finalists in the first season of Polish TV series Idol, where he finished fifth. Following that, he signed a record deal with the Polish division of BMG. Makowiecki became the frontman of a band called Makowiecki Band, and released his debut album with the group in December 2002. It was followed by the release of Piosenki na NIE in 2005.

=== Ostatnie wspólne zdjęcie and NO! NO! NO! (2007–2011) ===
In 2007, Makowiecki released his third studio album, titled Ostatnie wspólne zdjęcie. A year later, he started a band called NO! NO! NO! with Przemysław Myszor and Wojciech Powaga, musicians for the Polish alternative rock band Myslovitz. The group's debut album NO! NO! NO! was released in March 2010, and received two nominations for the Polish music award Fryderyk.

=== Return to solo career (2013–present) ===
Makowiecki's first solo album in seven years, Moizm, was released in October 2013. It is promoted by the single "Holidays in Rome".

== Personal life ==
In 2008, Makowiecki married Polish pop singer Reni Jusis. They are both vegetarians. The couple has two children, son Teofil (born on 1 January 2010) and daughter Gaja (born 2012). They divorced in April 2019.

== Discography ==
=== Studio albums ===
Title	Album details	Peak chart positions
Title	Album details	POL
Makowiecki Band	Released: December 9, 2002; Label: BMG	13
Piosenki na NIE	Released: May 2, 2005; Label: Sony BMG	27
Ostatnie wspólne zdjęcie	Released: October 22, 2007; Label: Sony BMG	30
Moizm	Released: October 8, 2013; Label: Sony Music Poland	17

=== Singles ===
Title	Year	Album
"Spełni się"	2002	Makowiecki Band
"Miasto kobiet"	2003	Makowiecki Band
"Oto jestem"	2003	Makowiecki Band
"Can't Get You Out of My Head"	2003	Makowiecki Band
"Między nocą a dniem"	2005	Piosenki na NIE
"Piosenka na nie"	2005	Piosenki na NIE
"Nie jesteś sam"	2007	Ostatnie wspólne zdjęcie
"Ostatnie wspólne zdjęcie"	2007	Ostatnie wspólne zdjęcie
"Szum wiatru i stereo"	2008	Ostatnie wspólne zdjęcie
"Holidays in Rome"	2013	Moizm
