= Szymon Wydra =

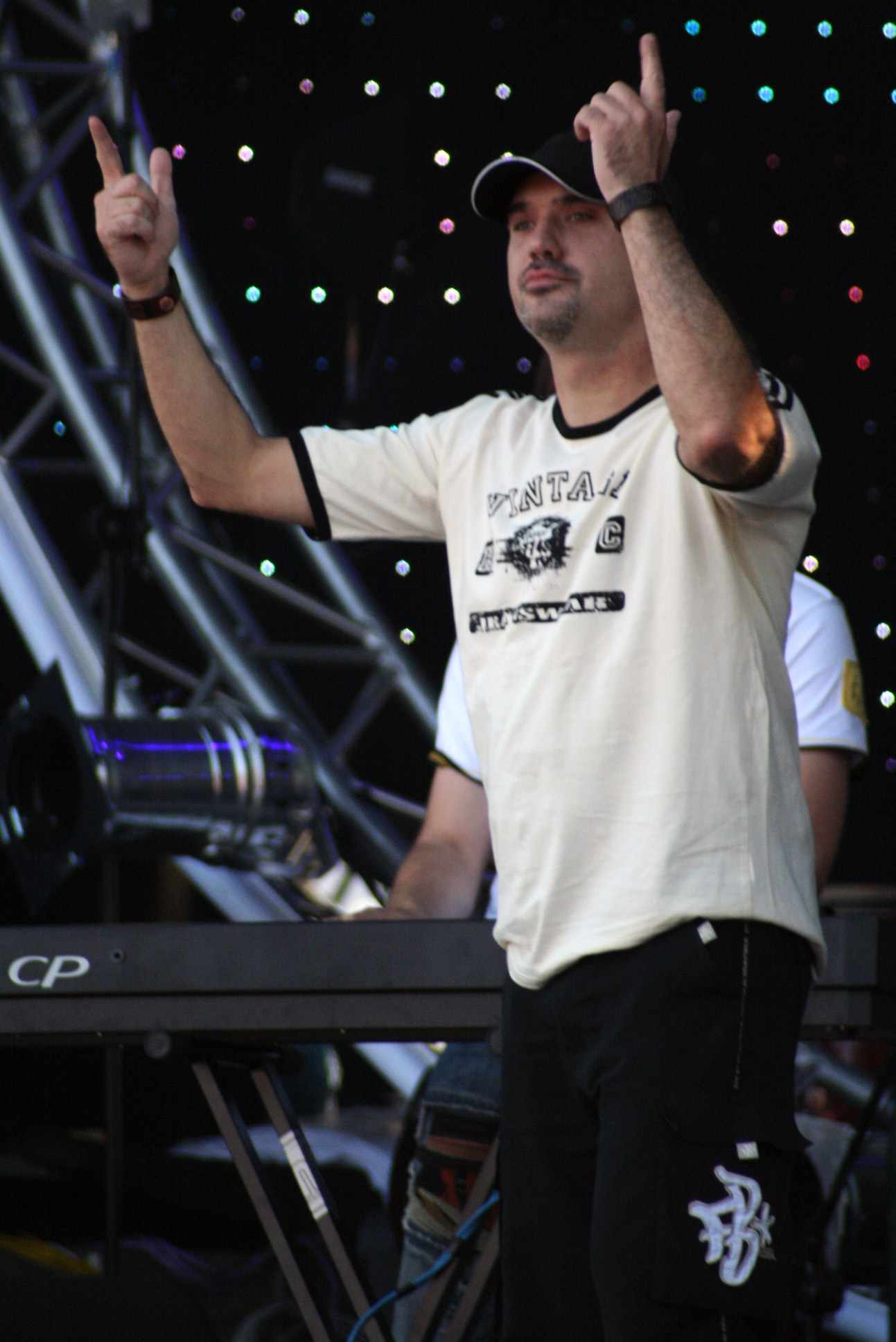

Background information
- Born: 11 March 1976 (age 50)
- Origin: Radom, Poland
- Genres: Rock music
- Occupations: Singer, Songwriter, Poet
- Years active: 1992-present
- Labels: BMG Poland, Universal Music Poland, Magic Records
- Website: http://www.wydra.pl

Szymon Wydra (Polish pronunciation: [ˈʂɨmɔn ˈvɨdra]; born 11 March 1976 in Radom) is a Polish rock vocalist, poet and finalist on the first edition of Polish Idol. He is also a vocalist of Carpe Diem.

== Career ==
Wydra's first music band, Nadzieja (Hope), existed for two years and played punk rock. He has been vocalist and leader of his own band, Szymon Wydra & Carpe Diem, since 1992. He took part in a popular Polish TV show Szansa na sukces (Chance for success) in 2001 and achieved respect but was not the winner. He performed again in the same show in February of the following year, singing a song by Ryszard Rynkowski and being chosen by him as the winning participant. On 13 December 2002 his band released their first album, entitled Teraz wiem (Now I know). Their second album, Bezczas was released in 2005.

In August 2007, Wydra was placed among five performers in the semi-final of Polish qualifications for the Sopot Festival. Then he performed with his band the song Gdzie jesteś dziś (Where are you today?) but the jury decided that Poland would be represented by another band, Feel with their song A gdy jest już ciemno.

He strongly criticized illegal downloading of his work from the Internet in one of his most recent interview, going so far as to claim once that it was worse than murder.

== Discography ==
=== Studio albums ===
Title	Album details	Peak chart positions
Title	Album details	POL
Teraz wiem	Released: 13 December 2002; Label: BMG Poland; Formats: CD	22
Bezczas	Released: 14 November 2005; Label: Universal Music Poland; Formats: CD	7
Remedium	Released: 26 November 2007; Label: Universal Music Poland; Formats: CD (+CD), digital download	25
Powołanie	Released: 6 September 2010; Label: Magic Records; Formats: CD, digital download	50
V Element	Released: 13 May 2014; Label: Universal Music Poland; Formats: CD, digital download	—
Przesłanie	Released: 11 June 2019; Label: Universal Music Poland; Formats: CD, digital download	—
"—" denotes a recording that did not chart or was not released in that territory.
