= Idol Poland season 3 =

Idol Poland
- Season 3
- Hosted by: Maciej Rock
- Judges: Marcin Prokop; Maciej Maleńczuk; Elżbieta Zapendowska; Jacek Cygan; Robert Leszczyński
- Winner: Monika Brodka
- Runner-up: Kuba Kęsy
- No. of episodes: 24

Release
- Original network: Polsat
- Original release: September 4, 2003 – January 12, 2004

Season chronology
- ← Previous; Season 2 Next → Season 4

Idol Poland (season 3) was the third season of Idol Poland. Monika Brodka won over Kuba Kęsy.

== Finals ==
=== Finalists ===
(ages stated at time of contest)

Contestant	Age	Hometown	Voted Off	Liveshow Theme
Monika Brodka	16	Żywiec	Winner	Grand Finale
Kuba Kęsy	19	Kluczbork	January 12, 2004	Grand Finale
Paweł Kowalczyk	22	Ząbkowice Śląskie	December 21, 2003	Love Songs
Michał Karpacki	19	Łódź	December 14, 2003	Multi-Languages
Adam Kozłowski	27	Augustów	December 7, 2003	Movies
Przemek Pakulak	17	Zawiercie	November 30, 2003	Latino
Gosia Karpiuk	18	Hajnówka	November 23, 2003	Clubbing
Kalina Kasprzak	20	Bełchatów	November 16, 2003	Millennium
Piotr Brodziński	21	Częstochowa	November 9, 2003	Rock
Michał Gęsikowski	24	Inowrocław	November 2, 2003	Unforgettable

=== Live Show Details ===
==== Heat 1 (9 October 2003) ====
Artist	Song (original artists)	Result
Anna Judycka-Muszyńska	"Don't Cry for Louie" (Vaya con Dios)	3rd place
Bartek Pietrzak	"Lover of Mine" (Alannah Myles)	Eliminated
Ewa Lasota	"Promise Me" (Beverley Craven)	Eliminated
Gosia Bochenek	"Skin on Skin" (Sarah Connor)	Eliminated
Michał Gęsikowski	"Wciąż bardziej obcy" (Lady Pank)	Advanced
Monika Stawicka	"Walking on Sunshine" (Katrina and the Waves)	Eliminated
Paweł Kowalczyk	"Aeroplane" (Red Hot Chili Peppers)	Advanced

==== Heat 2 (13 October 2003) ====
Artist	Song (original artists)	Result
Daniel Mateja	"Sen o Victorii" (Dżem)	Eliminated
Edson Ganga Neto	"Fly Away" (Lenny Kravitz)	Eliminated
Ilona Rojewska	"Brzydcy" (Grażyna Łobaszewska)	3rd place
Joanna Warga	"Stało się" (Izabela Trojanowska)	Eliminated
Michał Karpacki	"Wherever You Will Go" (The Calling)	Advanced
Monika Brodka	"Half Moon" (Janis Joplin)	Advanced
Tomasz Hoffman	"Lately" (Stevie Wonder)	Eliminated

==== Heat 3 (16 October 2003) ====
Artist	Song (original artists)	Result
Adam Kozłowski	"If Ever" (Stevie Wonder)	Advanced
Diana Trochim	"Rock and Roll" (Led Zeppelin)	Eliminated
Grzegorz Stępień	"Angel" (Lionel Richie)	Eliminated
Kasia Dobrzańska	"Brzydcy" (Grażyna Łobaszewska)	Eliminated
Natalia Penar	"Nadzieja" (Ira)	3rd place
Olek Różanek	"We Are the Champions" (Queen)	Eliminated
Piotr Brodziński	"Lately" (Stevie Wonder)	Advanced

==== Heat 4 (20 October 2003) ====
Artist	Song (original artists)	Result
Ela Widulińska	"I Wanna Dance with Somebody (Who Loves Me)" (Whitney Houston)	Eliminated
Gosia Karpiuk	"In God We Trust" (Robert Janowski)	Advanced
Kalina Kasprzak	"I Surrender" (Celine Dion)	Advanced
Marcin Borkowski	"All Right Now" (Free)	3rd place
Marcin Koczot	"Kiss from a Rose" (Seal)	Eliminated
Marcin Mroziński	"You" (Ten Sharp)	Eliminated
Tacjana Gacka	"Then You Look at Me" (Celine Dion)	Eliminated

==== Heat 5 (23 October 2003) ====
Artist	Song (original artists)	Result
Adria Jakubik	"Sen" (Edyta Bartosiewicz)	Eliminated
Karolina Kiczmer	"The Show Must Go On" (Queen)	Eliminated
Kasia Seta	"Windą do nieba" (2 Plus 1)	Eliminated
Kuba Kęsy	"Speed King" (Deep Purple)	Advanced
Marcin Musiał	"Unchain My Heart" (Joe Cocker)	3rd place
Maria Piasecka	"Respect" (Aretha Franklin)	Eliminated
Przemek Pakulak	"I Love You" (T.Love)	Advanced

==== Live Show 1 (2 November 2003) ====
Theme: Unforgettable

Artist	Song (original artists)	Result
Adam Kozłowski	"Hey Joe" (Jimi Hendrix)	Safe
Gosia Karpiuk	"Telefony" (Republika)	Safe
Kalina Kasprzak	"Move Over" (Janis Joplin)	Safe
Kuba Kęsy	"Come as You Are" (Nirvana)	Bottom two
Michał Gęsikowski	"Smells Like Teen Spirit" (Nirvana)	Eliminated
Michał Karpacki	"Don't Stop Me Now" (Queen)	Safe
Monika Brodka	"Light My Fire" (The Doors)	Safe
Paweł Kowalczyk	"Fever" (Peggy Lee)	Safe
Piotr Brodziński	"Imagine" (John Lennon)	Safe
Przemek Pakulak	"Here Comes the Sun" (The Beatles)	Safe

==== Live Show 2 (9 November 2003) ====
Theme: Rock

Artist	Song (original artists)	Result
Adam Kozłowski	"Kayleigh" (Marillion)	Bottom two
Gosia Karpiuk	"Szare miraże" (Maanam)	Safe
Kalina Kasprzak	"Total Eclipse of the Heart" (Bonnie Tyler)	Safe
Kuba Kęsy	"(I Can't Get No) Satisfaction" (The Rolling Stones)	Safe
Michał Karpacki	"With or Without You" (U2)	Safe
Monika Brodka	"Szał" (Edyta Bartosiewicz)	Safe
Paweł Kowalczyk	"Cryin'" (Aerosmith)	Safe
Piotr Brodziński	"Don't Lose My Number" (Phil Collins)	Eliminated
Przemek Pakulak	"Middle of the Road" (The Pretenders)	Safe

==== Live Show 3 (16 November 2003) ====
Theme: Millennium

Artist	Song (original artists)	Result
Adam Kozłowski	"Sunrise" (Simply Red)	Safe
Gosia Karpiuk	"Fallin'" (Alicia Keys)	Safe
Kalina Kasprzak	"Not That Kind" (Anastacia)	Eliminated
Kuba Kęsy	"By the Way" (Red Hot Chili Peppers)	Safe
Michał Karpacki	"How You Remind Me" (Nickelback)	Bottom two
Monika Brodka	"Just Like a Pill" (Pink)	Safe
Paweł Kowalczyk	"Hot Fudge" (Robbie Williams)	Safe
Przemek Pakulak	"Maybe" (Brainstorm)	Safe

==== Live Show 4 (23 November 2003) ====
Theme: Clubbing

Artist	Song (original artists)	Result
Adam Kozłowski	"Billie Jean" (Michael Jackson)	Safe
Gosia Karpiuk	"Rhythm Is a Dancer" (Snap!)	Eliminated
Kuba Kęsy	"Let's Groove" (Earth, Wind & Fire)	Safe
Michał Karpacki	"Lady (Hear Me Tonight)" (Modjo)	Safe
Monika Brodka	"Breathe" (Blu Cantrell)	Safe
Paweł Kowalczyk	"Sing It Back" (Moloko)	Safe
Przemek Pakulak	"Just the Two of Us" (Bill Withers)	Bottom two

==== Live Show 5 (30 November 2003) ====
Theme: Latino

Artist	Song (original artists)	Result
Adam Kozłowski	"Maria Maria" (Santana)	Safe
Kuba Kęsy	"Smooth" (Santana & Rob Thomas)	Safe
Michał Karpacki	"Canción del Mariachi" (Los Lobos & Antonio Banderas)	Safe
Monika Brodka	"Conga" (Miami Sound Machine)	Bottom two
Paweł Kowalczyk	"Czarna Inez" (Raz, Dwa, Trzy)	Safe
Przemek Pakulak	"Mambo No. 5" (Lou Bega)	Eliminated

==== Live Show 6 (7 December 2003) ====
Theme: Movies

Artist	Song (original artists)	Result
Adam Kozłowski	"Eye of the Tiger" (Survivor)	Eliminated
Kuba Kęsy	"I Got You (I Feel Good)" (James Brown)	Safe
Michał Karpacki	"Everybody Needs Somebody to Love" (The Blues Brothers)	Bottom two
Monika Brodka	"Blue Velvet" (Bobby Vinton)	Safe
Paweł Kowalczyk	"Deeper Underground" (Jamiroquai)	Safe

==== Live Show 7 (14 December 2003) ====
Theme: Multilanguages

Artist	First song (original artists)	Second song	Result
Kuba Kęsy	"99 Luftballons" (Nena)	"Dziewczyna o perłowych włosach" (Omega)	Safe
Michał Karpacki	"Baila (Sexy Thing)" (Zucchero)	"Gitan" (Garou)	Eliminated
Monika Brodka	"Garota de Ipanema" (Caetano Veloso)	"Kalashnikov" (Goran Bregović)	Safe
Paweł Kowalczyk	"Chan Chan" (Buena Vista Social Club)	"Şımarık" (Tarkan)	Bottom two

==== Live Show 8: Semi-final (21 December 2003) ====
Theme: Love Songs

Artist	First song (original artists)	Second song	Result
Kuba Kęsy	"Can't Buy Me Love" (The Beatles)	"Do Ani" (Kult)	Safe
Monika Brodka	"Kiss of Life" (Sade)	"That's the Way Love Goes" (Janet Jackson)	Bottom two
Paweł Kowalczyk	"Angie" (The Rolling Stones)	"I Belong to You" (Lenny Kravitz)	Eliminated

==== Live final (4 January 2004) ====
Artist	First song	Second song	Result
Kuba Kęsy	"Kocica"	"Love, Hate, Love"	Runner-up
Monika Brodka	"Moje ostatnie słowo"	"Appletree"	Winner
