= Trzynasta w Samo Południe =

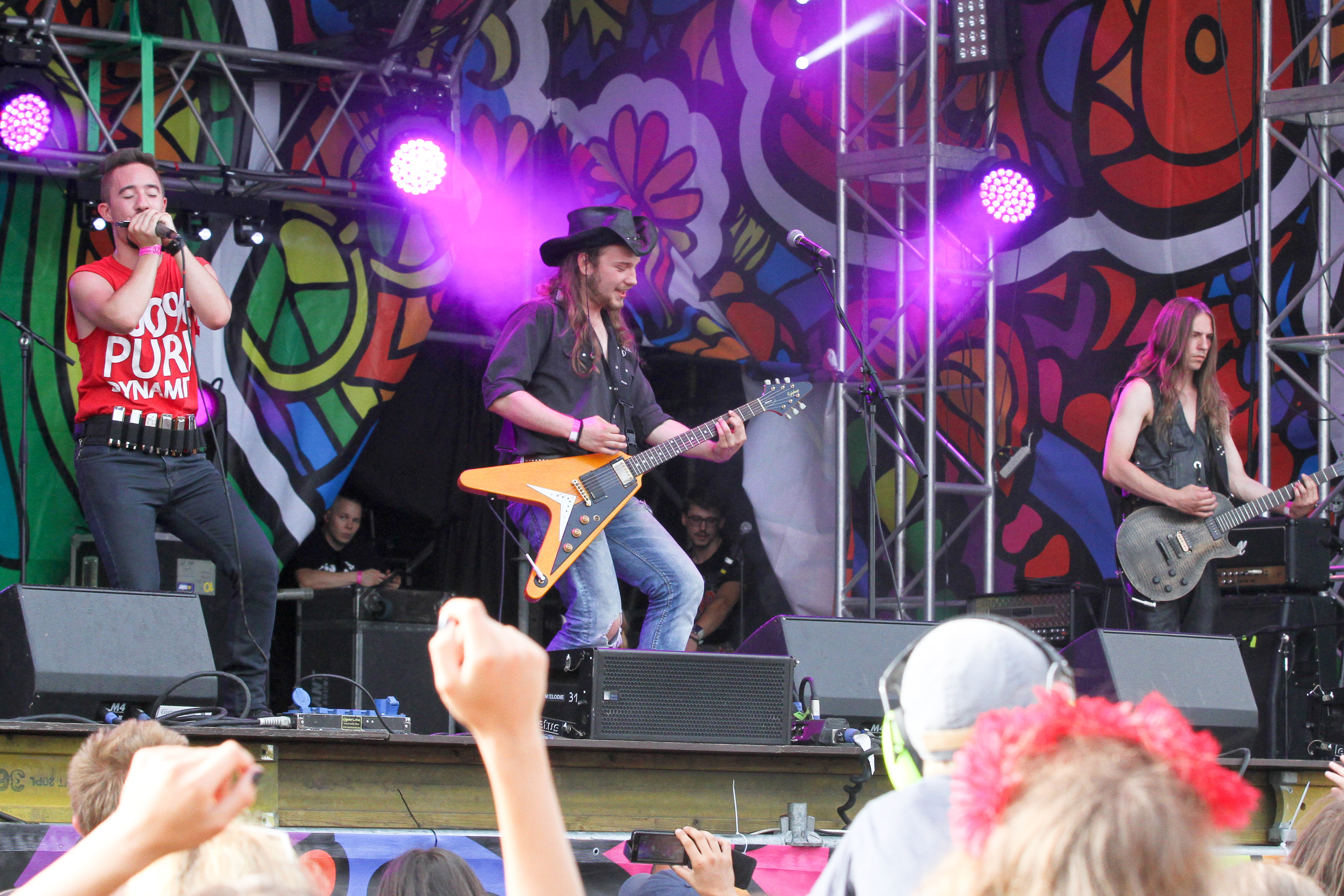

Background information
- Origin: Poland
- Genres: rock
- Years active: 2009–present
- Labels: Sony Music Entertainment Poland
- Members: Michał Pocheć; Katz; Krootky; Młody; Bandaż
- Website: www.trzynasta.com

Trzynasta w Samo Południe, is a Polish rock band formed in 2009.

In 2014 the band participated in the Polish version of the television show X Factor.

== Discography ==
Studio albums

Title	Album details	Peak chart positions
Title	Album details	POL
Hell Yeah!	Released: October 21, 2014; Label: Sony Music Entertainment Poland; Formats: CD, digital download	25
"—" denotes a recording that did not chart or was not released in that territory.

Music videos

Title	Year	Directed	Album	Ref.
"Hell Yeah!"	2014	Przemek Chojnacki	Hell Yeah!	
