= Maciej Cieślak =

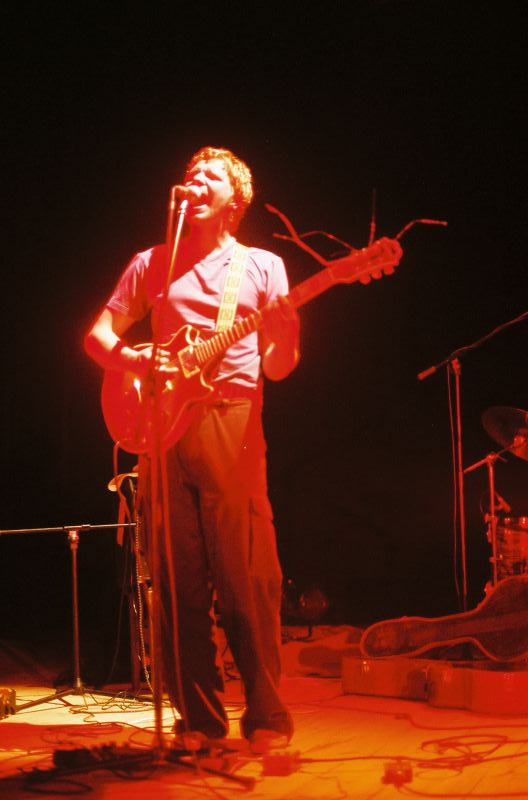

Background information
- Born: Maciej Cieślak; 9 September 1969 (age 56); Gdańsk
- Genres: alternative rock, experimental rock, psychedelic rock, indie rock
- Occupations: record producer, songwriter, musician, guitarist, vocalist
- Instruments: vocals, guitar
- Years active: 1994–present
- Label: My Shit in Your Coffee

Maciej Cieślak (born 9 September 1969 in Gdańsk) is a Polish guitarist and songwriter, best known as the vocalist and guitarist of the alternative rock band Ścianka, which he founded in November 1994 in Sopot. Cieślak is also a member of Kings of Caramel music band.
