= Andrzej Piaseczny =

Polish singer, songwriter, and actor (born 1971)

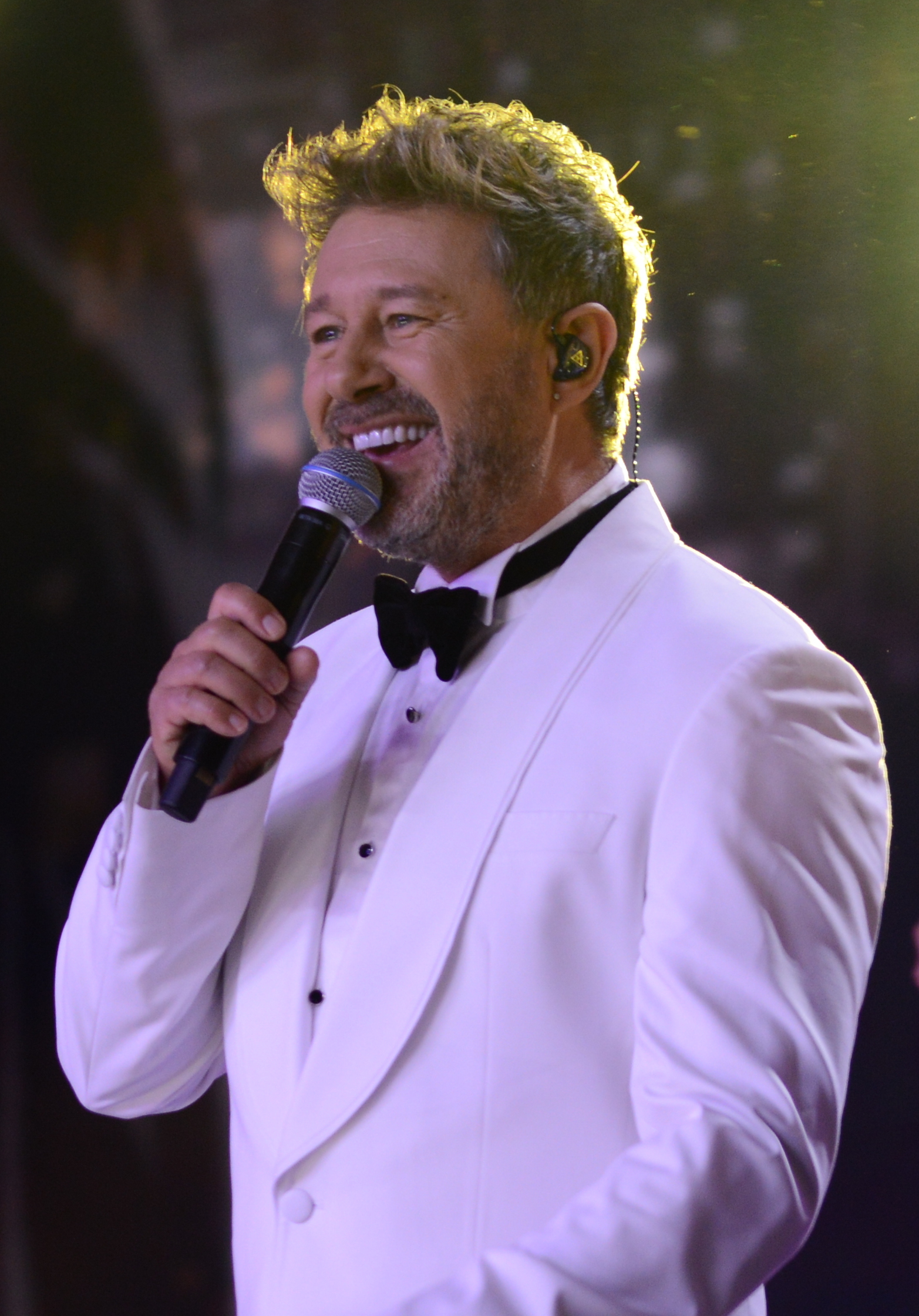
- Piaseczny in 2022
- Born: 6 January 1971 (age 55); Pionki, Poland
- Occupations: Singer, actor, songwriter
- Musical career
- Also known as: Piasek
- Genres: Pop
- Instrument: vocals
- Years active: 1992–present
- Labels: BMG Poland, Sony BMG Music Entertainment Poland, Sony Music Entertainment Poland
- Formerly of: Mafia
- Website: piasek.art.pl

Signature
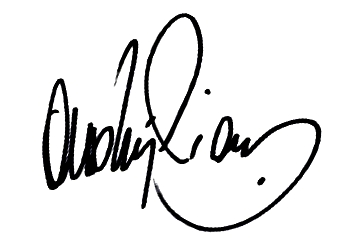

Andrzej Tomasz Piaseczny (Polish: [ˈand͡ʐɛj pjaˈsɛt͡ʂnɨ]; born 6 January 1971 in Pionki) more commonly known as Piasek, is a Polish singer-songwriter, actor, and television personality. Former Mafia singer, Member of the Phonographic Academy of ZPAV. In the years 1997–2010 he performed in the TV series Złotopolscy, where he played the singer Kacper "Górniak" Złotopolski. His solo career began in 1998. In the same year he performed in a duet with Natalia Kukulska, with whom he recorded the song "You Are Near Me", and also released a solo single "I Know My Way", used in the soundtrack to the movie The Magic Sword – Camelot Legend. Piasek represented Poland in the Eurovision Song Contest 2001 with his up-tempo dance song "2 Long". Since 2008, the artist has collaborated with Seweryn Krajewski.

== Life and career ==
=== Childhood and education ===
Andrzej Piaseczny was born on 6 January 1971 in Pionki near Radom. He became interested in music in his childhood, performing in the Cavatin school band. After graduating from high school, he enrolled at WSP in Kielce. He studied music education. He has an older brother, a judge and harpist ZHR Krzysztof Piaseczny, and a younger sister Basia.

=== Music career ===
==== 1992–97: Cooperation with the Mafia band and Robert Chojnacki ====
In 1992, Piaseczny joined the Mafia band. In the same year he took part in the contest of young talents in Wroclaw and in the concert "Debiuty" at the Festival in Opole. Mafia's debut album of the same title was released on 3 November 1993 by the Kraków-based record company TOP Music. In February 1995, Mafia's second studio album, Gabinety, was released. The recordings were promoted by ballad titled "Noce całe", but a large part of the album was rock songs. Also in 1995, album of saxophonist Robert Chojnacki, which was recorded with Piaseczny and entitled Sax & Sex was released. In 1996, the album was certified double platinum. Also in 1996 album Sax & Dance was released, which featured remixed songs from Sax & Sex. That same year, the latest Mafia album recorded with Piaseczny entitled FM. In 1997, Piaseczny together with the group recorded the single "Wolność jest w nas" promoting the film entitled "Sara". Later that year, he ended his cooperation with the band.

==== 1998–99: Piasek and Country Songs Festival of the Baltic States ====
In early 1998, the singer's debut solo album Piasek was released. Album spawned the singles "Mocniej" and "Jeszcze bliżej", as well as the song "Pogodniej (Złoty środek)", which used as the main theme of the music series Złotopolscy. Also in 1998, song "Wciąż bardziej obcy" recorded by Piaseczny with the guest participation of Jan Borysewicz from Lady Pank, as well as two songs performed in collaboration with Natalia Kukulska – "Jesteś blisko mnie" and "Znam drogę swą" were released. In 1999 the singer took part in Karlshamn's Baltic Songs Festival. During the concert he sang the composition "Jeszcze biżej", thanks to which he won the second prize and the Audience Award.

==== 2000–02: Popers and the Eurovision Song Contest ====
On 16 February 2000, his second solo album entitled Popers was released. Ewa Bem, jazz musician Wojciech Karolak, bassist Vail Johns and saxophonist Eric Marienthal participated in the recording. As part of the promotion at the Polish Theater in Warsaw, Piaseczny played a concert called Piasek and Friends, which guest stars included Jan Borysewicz, Reni Jusis and Anna Przybylska. In February 2001, the singer was chosen internally by Polish Television to represent Poland during the 46th Eurovision Song Contest, which was held in Copenhagen in May 2001. He sang the song "2 Long" and finished 20th from a field of 23 participating countries with 11 points, 2 points from which were given by Sweden, 3 points by Slovenia, 5 points by Germany and 1 point by Denmark. After the Eurovision final he was awarded the Barbara Dex Award as the worst dressed participant of the competition according to the Internet poll.

In 2002 the song "Oj Kot" was released. The song promoted the movie Revenge, directed by Andrzej Wajda.

==== 2003–05: Andrzej Piaseczny and Jednym tchem ====
On 10 November 2003, his third studio album, Andrzej Piaseczny, was released. The album was promoted by singles "Szczęście jest blisko", "Teraz płacz" and "Jedna na milion". The album reached the 13th position of Polish chart OLiS. In 2004, Piaseczny participated in an Olympic fire relay at the Athens Summer Olympics. In September of the same year, Krzysztof Krawczyk's single "Przytul me życie" was released in a duet with Piaseczny.

In 2005, Piaseczny took part in the recordings of the album entitled "Words" containing songs composed from the poems of John Paul II. On 3 September 2005 Piaseczny performed at the Festival in Sopot, where he sang the song Z głębi duszy", thanks to which he won the main award of Bursztynowy Słowik. On 19 September, his fourth solo album titled Jednym tchem was released, which at the end of 2006 was gained the platinum status in Poland.

Also in 2005, Robert Chojnacki's solo album, Saxophonic, was released, featuring Piaseczny. In December 2005, Piaseczny appeared in the program "Arie z uśmiechem" broadcast on TVP2, where he sang two opera arias: "Dziewczyno Ty moja" and "Usta milczą, dusza śpiewa" together with Katarzyna Cerekwicka. In 2007 Piaseczny performed at the TOPtrenda Festival in Sopot, and also participated in Seweryn Krajewski's recital entitled "Niebo z moich stron" ("Heaven from My Parties") which took place at the National Festival of Polish Songs in Opole.

==== 2008–09: 15 dni, Spis rzeczy ulubionych ====
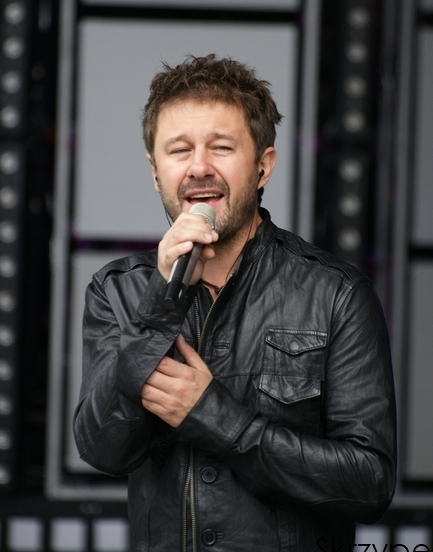
Andrzej Piaseczny, 2009

On 7 April 2008, on the occasion of the fifteen years of Piaseczny's artistic activity, album entitled "15 dni" was released. "15 dni" featured his most popular songs and two new songs: „Komu potrzebny żal” and „15 dni”. At the end of March 2009, his fourth solo album entitled "Spis rzeczy ulubionych" was released. The album was composed by Seweryn Krajewski. One of the singles from the album - "Chodź, przytul, przebacz", was honored in the music program "Hit Generator". On 30 November 2008 Piaseczny and Seweryn Krajewski's concert album titled "Na przekór nowym czasom – live" was released.

In January 2010, the singer received Telekamera award in the Music category. On 15 April 2011, Piaseczny and Stanislaw Sojka's album, "W blasku światła" was released.

==== 2011–14: To co dobre ====
In Autumn 2011, Piaseczny, along with Katarzyna "Kayah" Rooijens, Anna Dąbrowska and Adam "Nergal" Darski, became a jury member of The Voice of Poland, which premiered in September on TVP2.

On 23 January 2012, Piaseczny's solo album titled "To co dobre" was released. In order to promote the album, singles „To co dobre, to co lepsze” and „Z dwojga ciał” were released. The album reached the first place in Polish chart OLiS. Also in 2012, Piaseczny took part in the third edition of the Bitwa na głosy, which he won with his team from Kielce.

In 2014, he performed as a guest in the finals of the show Dancing with the Stars.

==== From 2015 : Kalejdoskop and The Voice of Poland ====
At the end of March 2015, Piaseczny's new album entitled Kalejdoskop was released. The album was recorded with Metropole Orkest. In order to promote th album, singles "Kalejdoskop szczęścia” and „O sobie samym” were released.

On 5 March 2016, he performed as a special guest of Polish national selection for the Eurovision Song Contest. During the show, he performed three songs: „Kalejdoskop szczęścia” and „W świetle dnia” and the "Ostatni".

In the fall of 2015, 2016 and 2017, he again sat on the jury of The Voice of Poland. In 2019-2021 he was one of the coaches in first and second season of The Voice Senior.

In the summer of 2021 it was announced that he will be one of the judges in the 25th season of Dancing with the Stars: Taniec z gwiazdami on Polsat.

=== Personal life ===
The artist came out as gay on 7 May 2021 in an interview with Radio Zet.

== Discography ==
=== Solo albums ===
Title	Album details	Peak chart positions	Sales	Certifications
Title	Album details	POL	Sales	Certifications
Piasek	Released: 14 January 1998; Label: BMG Poland; Formats: CD, digital download	—	POL: 50,000+; 100,000	POL: Gold; Platinum
Popers	Released: 21 January 2000; Label: BMG Poland; Formats: CD, digital download	—		
Andrzej Piaseczny	Released: 30 November 2003; Label: BMG Poland; Formats: CD	13		
Jednym tchem	Released: 19 September 2005; Label: Sony BMG Poland; Formats: CD, digital download	1	POL: 30,000+	POL: Platinum
15 dni	Released: 4 April 2008; Label: Sony BMG Poland; Formats: CD, digital download	7	POL: 30,000+	POL: Platinum
Spis rzeczy ulubionych	Released: 30 March 2009; Label: Sony Music Poland; Formats: CD, digital download	1	80,000+	POL: 2× Platinum
To co dobre	Released: 23 January 2012; Label: Sony Music Poland; Formats: CD, digital download	1	POL: 30,000+	POL: Platinum
Kalejdoskop	Released: 24 March 2015; Label : Sony Music Poland	2	POL: 30,000+	POL: Platinum
O mnie, o tobie, o nas	Released: 13 October 2017; Label : Sony Music Poland	2	POL: 15,000+	POL: Gold
50/50	Released: 7 May 2021; Label : Mystic Production	4		
"—" denotes a recording that did not chart or was not released in that territory.

=== Collaborative albums ===
Title	Album details	Peak chart positions	Sales	Certifications
Title	Album details	POL	Sales	Certifications
Na przekór nowym czasom – live with Seweryn Krajewski	Released: 30 November 2009; Label: Sony Music Poland; Formats: CD, digital download	2	POL: 60,000+	POL: 2× Platinum
W blasku światła with Stanisław Sojka	Released: 15 April 2011; Label: QM Music; Formats: CD, digital download	—		
Zimowe piosenki with Seweryn Krajewski	Released: 12 November 2012; Label: Sony Music Poland; Formats: CD, digital download	1	POL: 30,000+	POL: Platinum
"—" denotes a recording that did not chart or was not released in that territory.

=== Other albums ===
ALBUM	Years	Sales	certifications	Comments
Mafia – Mafia	1993			Member of the band "Mafia" singer, songwriter
Mafia – Gabinety	1995	200,000+	Gold	Member of the band "Mafia" singer, songwriter
Robert Chojnacki – Sax & Sex	1995	1,500,000	Multi platinum	Featuring singing, songwriter
Robert Chojnacki – Sax & Dance	1996			Featuring singing
Mafia – FM	1996	300,000+	Gold; Platinum	Member of the band,"Mafia" singer, songwriter
K.A.S.A. – Prezes kuli ziemskiej	1997			Guest singing in the song "Be Here and Now"
Automatik – Cosmoson5	1999			Guest singing in the song "I am"
Krzysztof Krawczyk – To, co w życiu ważne	2004			Guest singing in the song "Hold my life", The author of the worlds to the song "Hold Me A Life"
Andrzej Piaseczny – Kolędy	2005	220,000		Music disc with carols as an addition to newspapers
Robert Chojnacki – Saxophonic	2006			Guest singing in the song "When I'm ...", "You will be back ..." and "Polish faces"
Grzegorz Turnau – Do zobaczenia	2009			Guest singing in the song "What will happen when hands fall off the lines"
Śniadanie do łóżka (ścieżka dźwiękowa)	2010			singing in the song "Breakfast to bed", the author of words to the song "Breakfast to bed"
Seweryn Krajewski – Jak tam jest	2011		Platinum	songwriter, singing in the song "smoke"

== Filmography ==
Title	Year	Comments
Złotopolscy	1997–2010	as Kacper Złotopolski (Kacper Górniak), directed by: various directors (television series)
Magiczny miecz – Legenda Camelotu	1998	role playing as Garrett (singing songs), directed by: Frederik Du Chau
Gwiazdka w Złotopolicach	1999	Directed by: Radosław Piwowarski
Trzymajmy się planu	2004	as Andrzej, directed by: Marcin Sobociński, Maciej Łęgowski
Niania	2007	as himself, guest star, episode 46. pt. "Kiss Queen", directed by: Jerzy Bogajewicz
Spadkobiercy	2010	as director of the school, featuring episode 34. (128.), directed by: Dariusz Kamys

== Prizes and awards ==
year	Category	Prize	Uwagi
1996	Best singer	Mikrofony Popcornu	Prize
1996	Best singer	Fryderyk	Prize
1996	Idol of the year	Machin magazine plebiscite	Prize
1996	Best singer	Playbox '96	Prize
1996	Best singer	Srebrne Otto '96	Prize
1998	Best singer	Dance Music Award	Prize
1998	Best singer	Mikrofony Popcornu	Prize
1998	Vocalist of the year	Fantastyczność '98	Prize
1998	hit of the year	Fantastyczność '98	Prize
1998	Phonographic debut	Fryderyk	nominations
1998	Album of the Year – Pop (Piasek)	Fryderyk	nominations
1999	Best singer	Mikrofony Popcornu	Prize
1999	Vocalist of the year	Fantastyczność '99	Prize
1999	2nd prize	Baltic Songs Festival	Prize
1999	Audience Award	Baltic Songs Festival	Prize
2001	The worst dressed artist	Prize name of Barbara Dex	Prize
2005	Bursztynowy Słowik	Sopot Festival	Prize
2005	Friend of the Enchanted Bird	Anna Dymna Foundation Award for All Things	Prize
2005	Artist of the year	Złote Dzioby	Prize
2005	Vocalist of the year	Fryderyk	nominations
2006	Author of the year	Fryderyk	nominations
2009	Artist of the Year	Superjedynki	Prize
2009	hit of the year ("Chodź, przytul, przebacz")	Superjedynki	Prize
2009	Super Performance	Superjedynki	Prize
2010	Music	Telekamera	Prize
2010	Best album (Spis rzeczy ulubionych)	Złote Dzioby	Prize
2010	Best singer	Eska Music Awards	Prize
2010	Concert TOP(Spis rzeczy ulubionych)	TOPtrendy 2010	Prize
2010	Author of the year	Fryderyk	Nominations
2010	Vocalist of the year	Fryderyk	Nominations
2010	Song of the year	Fryderyk	Nominations
2011	Vocalist of the year	Fryderyk	Nominations
2011	Music	Wiktory 2011	Prize
2013	Concert TOP ("To co dobre" i "Zimowe piosenki")	TOPtrendy2013	Prize
2015	STARBANK for participation in the spot "Talk to me"		Prize
2015	Golden Microphone Made in Kielce	Microphones Made in Kielce	Prize
2016	Super album – Kalejdoskop szczęścia	Superjedynki	Prize

Awards and achievements
Preceded by Mietek Szcześniak with "Przytul mnie mocno"	Poland in the Eurovision Song Contest; 2001	Succeeded by Ich Troje with "Keine Grenzen – Żadnych granic"
