= Sony Music Entertainment Poland =

Polish record company, subsidiary of Sony Music Entertainment International Limited

- Parent company: Sony Music Entertainment (SME)
- Founded: 1995; 31 years ago
- Genre: Various
- Country of origin: Warsaw, Poland
- Location: Poland
- Official website: www.sonymusic.pl

Sony Music Entertainment Poland Sp. z o.o. (SMEP) is a Polish subsidiary of Sony Music Entertainment. It was founded in 1995 in Warsaw. The label's CEO is Kazimierz Pułaski.

The label was founded after Sony Music Entertainment took over the catalogue of MJM Music PL in late 1995. In 2003, MJM Music PL split from SME Poland and has since run as an independent label.

In 2004, the label merged with BMG Poland and formed Sony BMG Music Entertainment Poland, as of joint venture deal between Sony Music Entertainment and Bertelsmann Music Group. Polish division of Sony BMG included such artists as Big Cyc, Coma, Kayah and Maryla Rodowicz, among others.

In 2008, after BMG was bought by Sony Music, the Polish label returned to the previous name Sony Music Entertainment Poland. The label's most recently signed artists include singer Dawid Podsiadło and the bands Trzynasta w Samo Południe and Bracia.

== Artists ==
=== Current ===
- Alicja Węgorzewska
- Andrzej Piaseczny
- Ania Teliczan
- Ania Wyszkoni
- Bracia
- Curly Heads
- Cool Kids Of Death
- De Mono
- Dawid Podsiadło
- Dorota Miśkiewicz
- Gienek Loska
- Grażyna Łobaszewska
- Kasia Cerekwicka
- Lady Pank
- Lora Szafran
- Mika Urbaniak
- Monika Borzym
- Jan Bo
- Paweł Kukiz
- Seweryn Krajewski
- Szczyl
- The Pryzmats
- Trzynasta w Samo Południe
- Varius Manx
- Wilki

=== Former ===
- Acid Drinkers
- Anna Dąbrowska
- Beneficjenci Splendoru
- Bliss
- Brathanki
- Braty z Rakemna
- Budyń
- Chłopcy z Placu Broni
- Crew (disbanded)
- Dr.no
- Farba
- Fiolka
- Fliper
- Georgina Tarasiuk
- Groovebusterz
- Grzegorz Skawiński
- Ha-dwa-O!
- Hedone
- Indigo
- Irena Staniek
- Janusz Olejniczak
- Jarek Weber
- Kasia Klich
- Katarzyna Groniec
- Katarzyna Skrzynecka
- Karolina Kozak
- Klatu (disbanded)
- Maciej Maleńczuk
- Małgorzata Ostrowska
- Łukasz Zagrobelny
- Marcin Rozynek
- Maria Sadowska
- Michał Bajor
- Monika Brodka
- Monopol
- Muchy
- Myslovitz
- O.N.A. (disbanded)
- Tatiana Okupnik
- Pati Yang
- Piotr Karpienia & Witold Cisło
- Pogodno
- Ptaky
- Renata Przemyk
- Robert M
- Sasha Strunin
- Stanisław Hadyna
- Strange Days
- Tip Top
- Tomek Wachnowski
- Voo Voo
- Zdrowa Woda
- Zbigniew Preisner
- Zbigniew Wodecki
- Zygmunt Staszczyk

== See also ==
- EMI Music Poland
- PolyGram Poland
- Universal Music Poland
- Warner Music Poland
