= Krzysztof Zalewski =

Polish singer

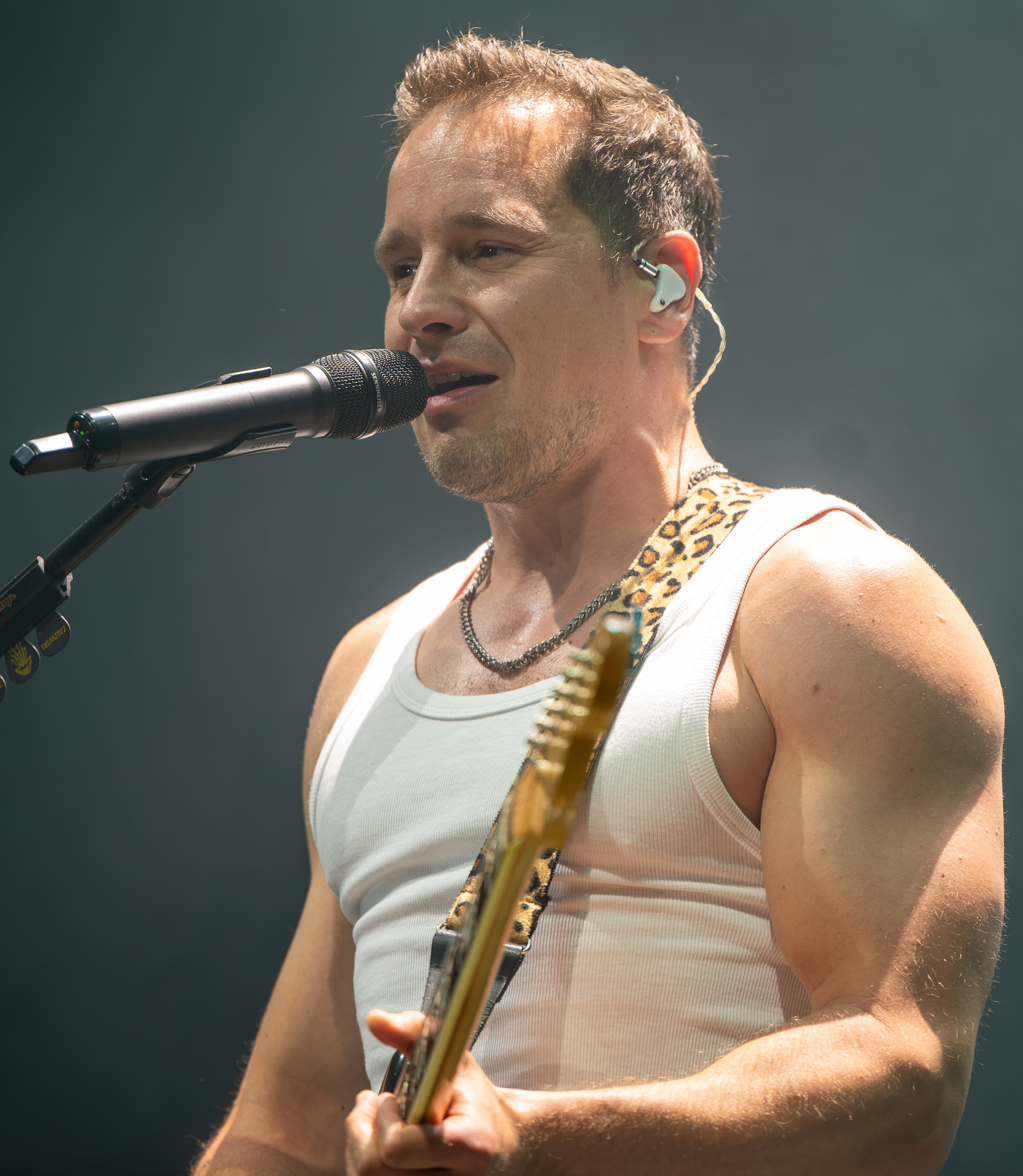
- Krzysztof Zalewski in 2026

Background information
- Born: 24 August 1984 (age 42); Lublin, Poland
- Origin: Poland
- Genres: rock, pop, alternative
- Occupations: Singer, musician
- Instruments: Guitar, keyboards, drums
- Labels: BMG Poland, Kayax

Krzysztof Zalewski (born 24 August 1984) is a Polish singer and the winner of Idol season two.

== Discography ==
=== Studio albums ===
Title	Album details	Peak chart positions
Title	Album details	POL
Pistolet (as Zalef)	Released: 1 March 2004; Label: BMG Poland; Formats: CD	7
Zelig	Released: 12 November 2013; Label: Kayax; Formats: CD, LP, digital download, streaming	3
Złoto	Released: 18 November 2016; Label: Kayax; Formats: CD, LP, digital download, streaming	1
Zalewski Śpiewa Niemena	Released: 26 January 2018; Label: Kayax; Formats: CD, LP, digital download, streaming	3
Zabawa	Released: 18 September 2020; Label: Kayax; Formats: CD, LP, digital download, streaming	2
Zgłowy	Released: 27 September 2024; Label: Kayax	

=== Music videos ===
Title	Year	Directed	Album	Ref.
"What I Am"	2004	—	Pistolet	
"Znikam"	2004	—	Pistolet	
"Jaśniej"	2013	Yulka Wilam	Zelig	
"Ósemko"	2013	Yulka Wilam	Zelig	
"Miłość Miłość"	2016	Piotr Onopa	Złoto	
"Luka"	2016	Kuba Szada-Borzyszkowski	Złoto	
"Polsko"	2017	Dzienis	Złoto	
"Jak Dobrze"	2017	Piotr Rajkowski	Złoto	
"Przyjdź w Taką Noc"	2017	Piotr Rajkowski	Zalewski Śpiewa Niemena	
"Podróżnik"	2018	Ewa Kaczmarek	Złoto	
"Status Mojego Ja"	2018	Piotr Rajkowski	Zalewski Śpiewa Niemena	
"Jednego Serca"	2018	Piotr Onopa	Zalewski Śpiewa Niemena	
"Kurier"	2019	Miroslaw Kuba Brozek	—	

Preceded by Alicja Janosz	Idol; Winner; Season 2 (2003)	Succeeded by Monika Brodka
