= Alicja Janosz =

Polish singer (born 1985)

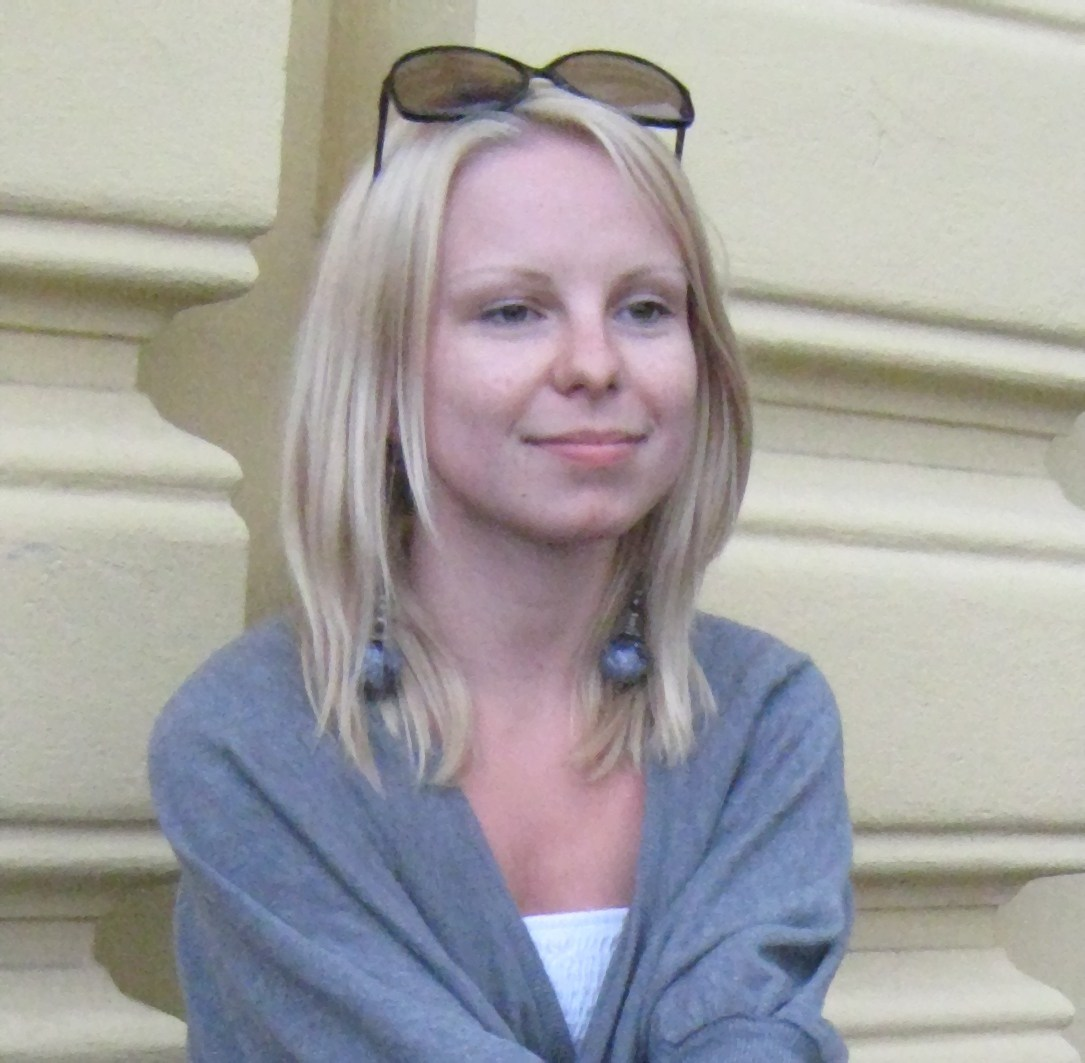
- Born: 4 June 1985 (age 41); Pszczyna, Poland
- Education: WSP in Warsaw
- Occupation: Singer
- Spouse: Bartosz Niebielecki
- Children: 1 (son)
- Musical career
- Genres: Pop, blues
- Years active: 2002–present
- Label: BMG Poland

Alicja Janosz (born 4 June 1985 in Pszczyna) is a Polish singer. She is the winner of 2002 Polish Idol. She also appeared in World Idol, where she sang "I Don't Know How to Love Him" from Jesus Christ Superstar. In November 2002, her debut album, Ala Janosz, was released.

In 2003, she recorded a song for the Polish version of Jungle Book 2, "Przyjaciel dobra rzecz" ("A friend is a good thing"). In April 2003, she recorded "To co w nas ukryte" for the Polish reality show "9 niezwykłych tygodni" ("9 amazing weeks").

In 2004, she took part in the Polish preselection to the Eurovision Song Contest and came 4th out of 15 acts. In 2005, she contributed the song "I'm still alive" to the charity album Voyces United for UNHCR.

In 2005, she recorded the song "Że z wiatrem raz" with Piotr Banach. In 2011, she released her second studio album, Vintage.

== Discography ==
=== Albums ===
- Ala Janosz POL #44
- Vintage

=== Singles ===
- Zmień siebie
- Zbudziłam się
- Przyjaciel dobra rzecz
- To co w nas ukryte
- Może się wydawać
- I'm still alive
- Dranie
- He's Just a Doggie
- I Can't Stand If (feat. HooDoo Band)
- Hush Hush
- I woke up so happy (2011)
- Jest jak jest (2011)
- Nie tak (2011)
- Zawsze za mało (2012)

=== Tracks contributed ===
- "Przyjaciel dobra rzecz" for the Polish version of Jungle Book 2
- Voyces United for UNHCR

Preceded by None	Idol (Poland); Winner; Season 1 (2002)	Succeeded by Krzysztof Zalewski
