= Maciej Silski =

Polish singer (born 1976)

Maciej Silski (also known as Maciek Silski, born 10 January 1976 in Kwidzyn, Poland) is a Polish singer who rose to fame in his country after winning Idol Poland 4, the Polish version of Pop Idol, televised by Polsat. He won with 53.58% of the vote in a three-way final on 18 June 2005.

Silski was one of 15 national finalists of the OGAE Poland competition to find a national representative for the Eurovision Song Contest 2006. He performed the song he co-wrote titled Za karę but did not win.

== Idol Poland 4 Performances ==
Szczecin Auditions: Rosemary by Lenny Kravitz
Semi Finals: Hunger Strike by Temple of the Dog
Top 10: Purple Rain by Prince
Top 9: Sen o Warszawie by Czesław Niemen
Top 8: Superstition by Stevie Wonder
Top 7: Rock Your Body by Justin Timberlake
Top 6: Ta ostatnia niedziela by Mieczysław Fogg
Top 5: Corazón Espinado by Santana
Top 5: La Bamba by Los Lobos
Top 4: Break On Through by The Doors
Top 4: Autobusy i tramwaje by T.Love
Grand Final: American Woman by The Guess Who
Grand Final: If You Don't Know Me By Now by Harold Melvin & the Blue Notes

=== Singles ===
- Za karę
- Póki jesteś
- Gdy umiera dzień

Preceded by Monika Brodka	Idol (Poland); Winner; Season 4 (2005)	Succeeded by ?
