= Hey (band) =

Polish rock band

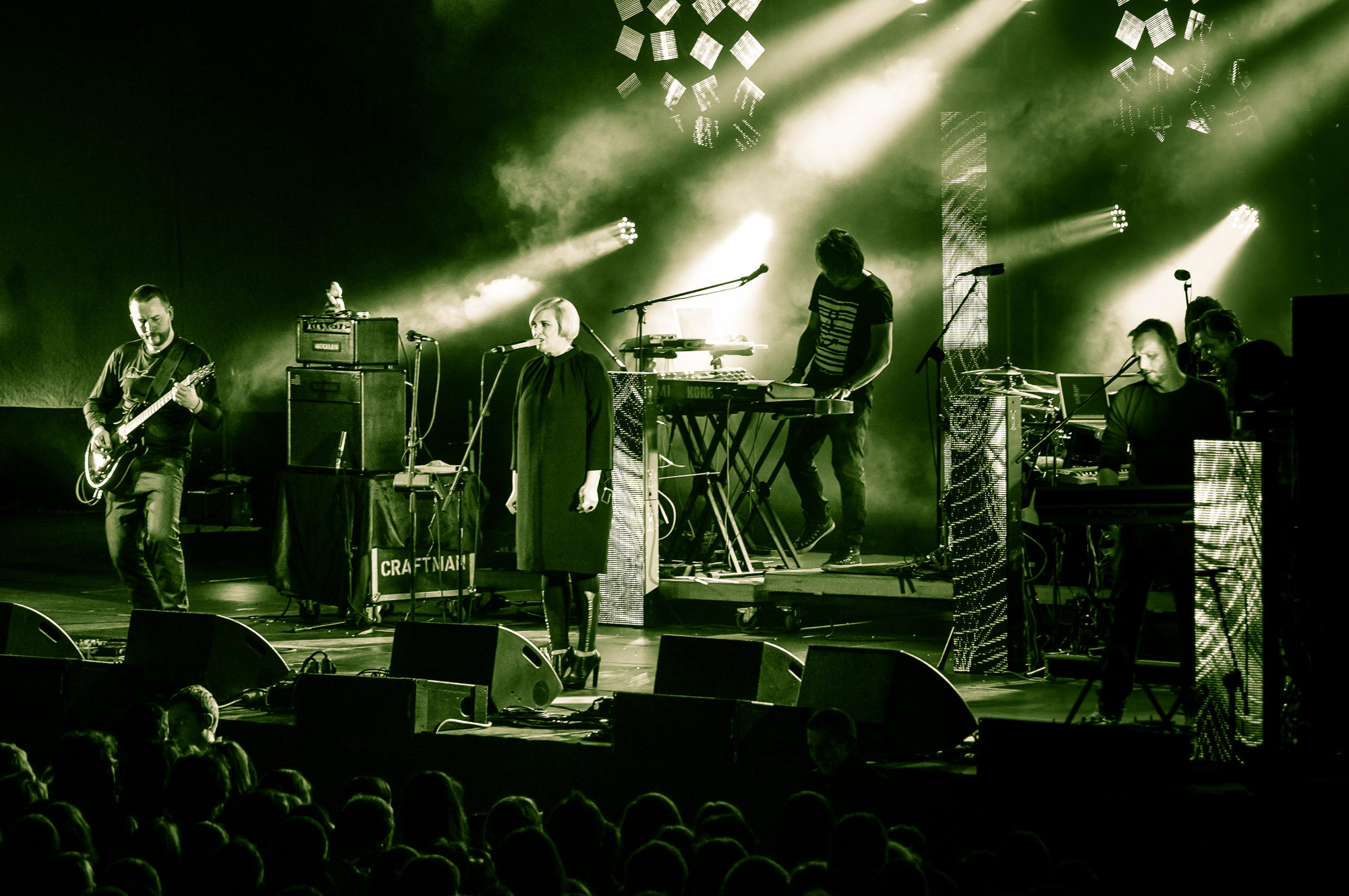
- Hey during Rocket Festiwal 2013, Warsaw, Poland.

Background information
- Origin: Szczecin, Poland
- Genres: Grunge, rock
- Years active: 1992–2017, 2021, 2023 (on hiatus since 2017)
- Labels: Izabelin Studio, PolyGram Poland, QL Music, Sony BMG Music Entertainment Poland, Warner Music Poland, Universal Music Poland, Złoty Melon, Agora SA, Supersam Music, Kayax
- Website: Official website

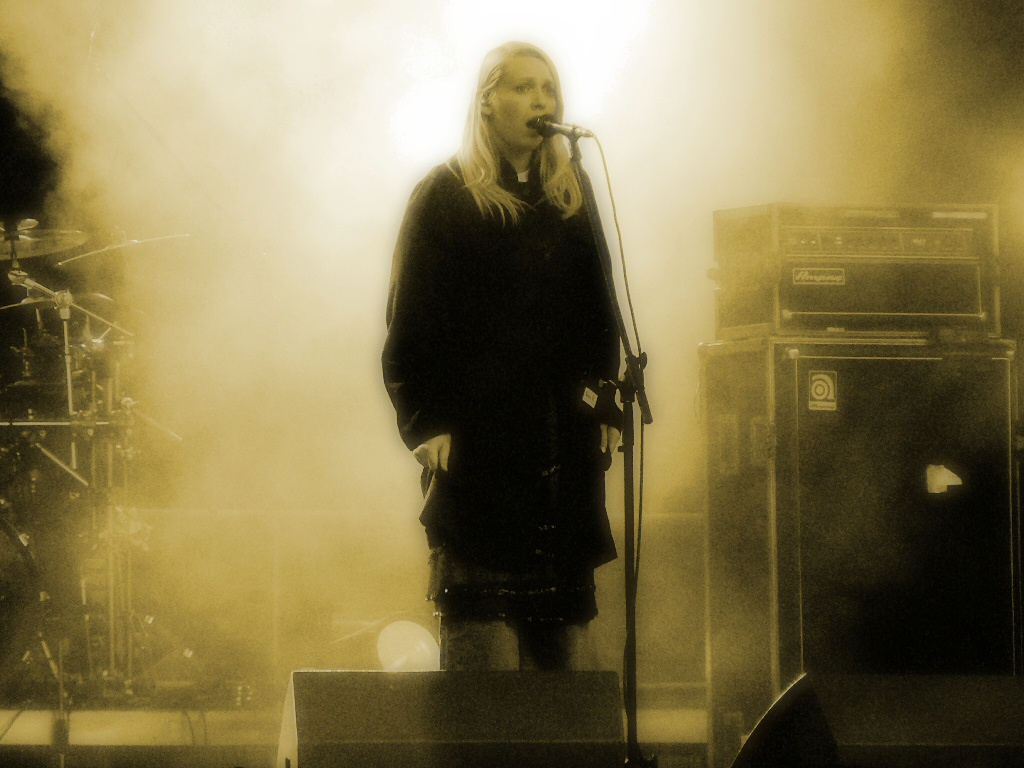
Katarzyna Nosowska (lead voc), 2006

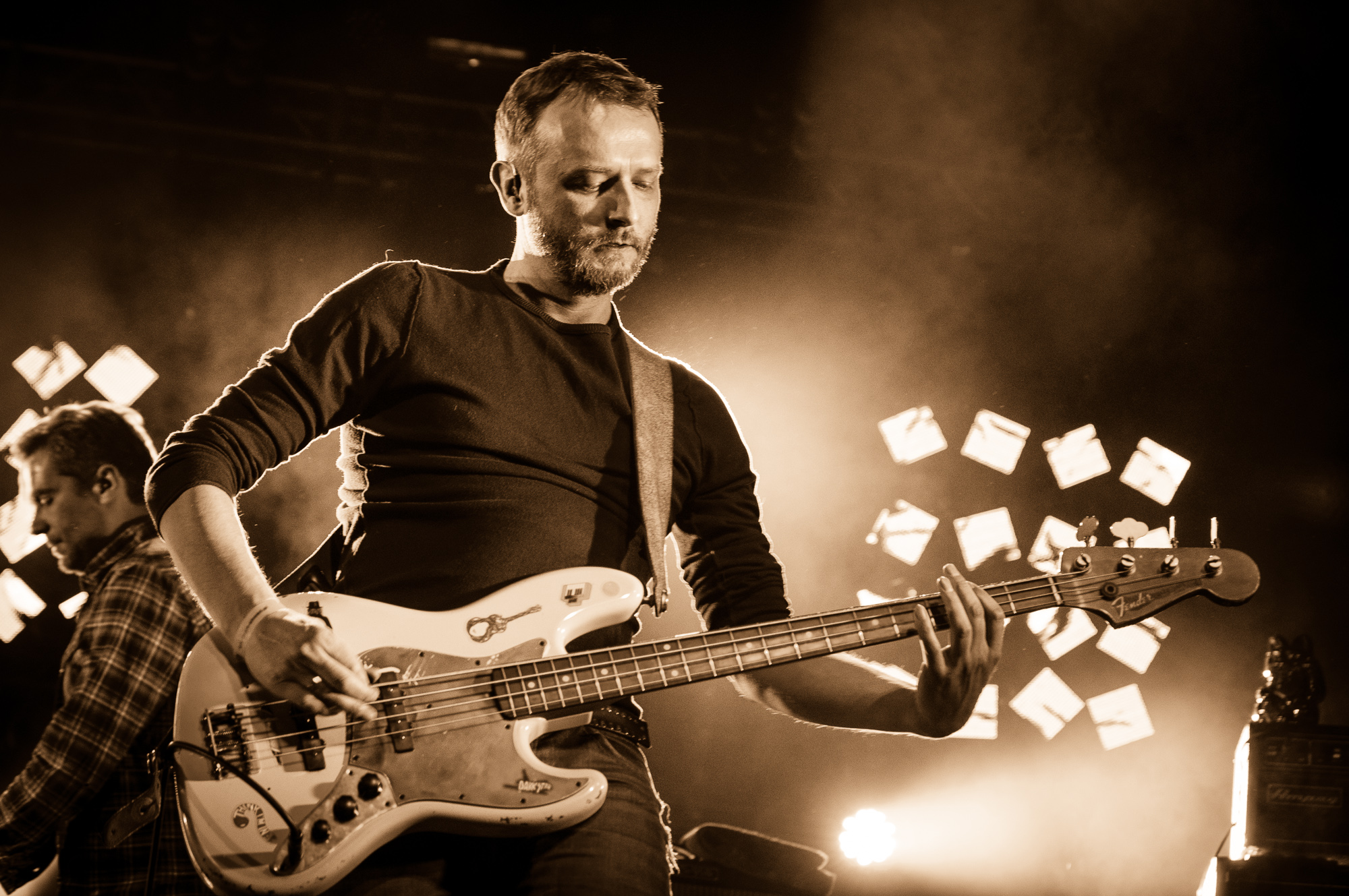
Jacek Chrzanowski during Rocket Festiwal 2013 in Warsaw, Poland.

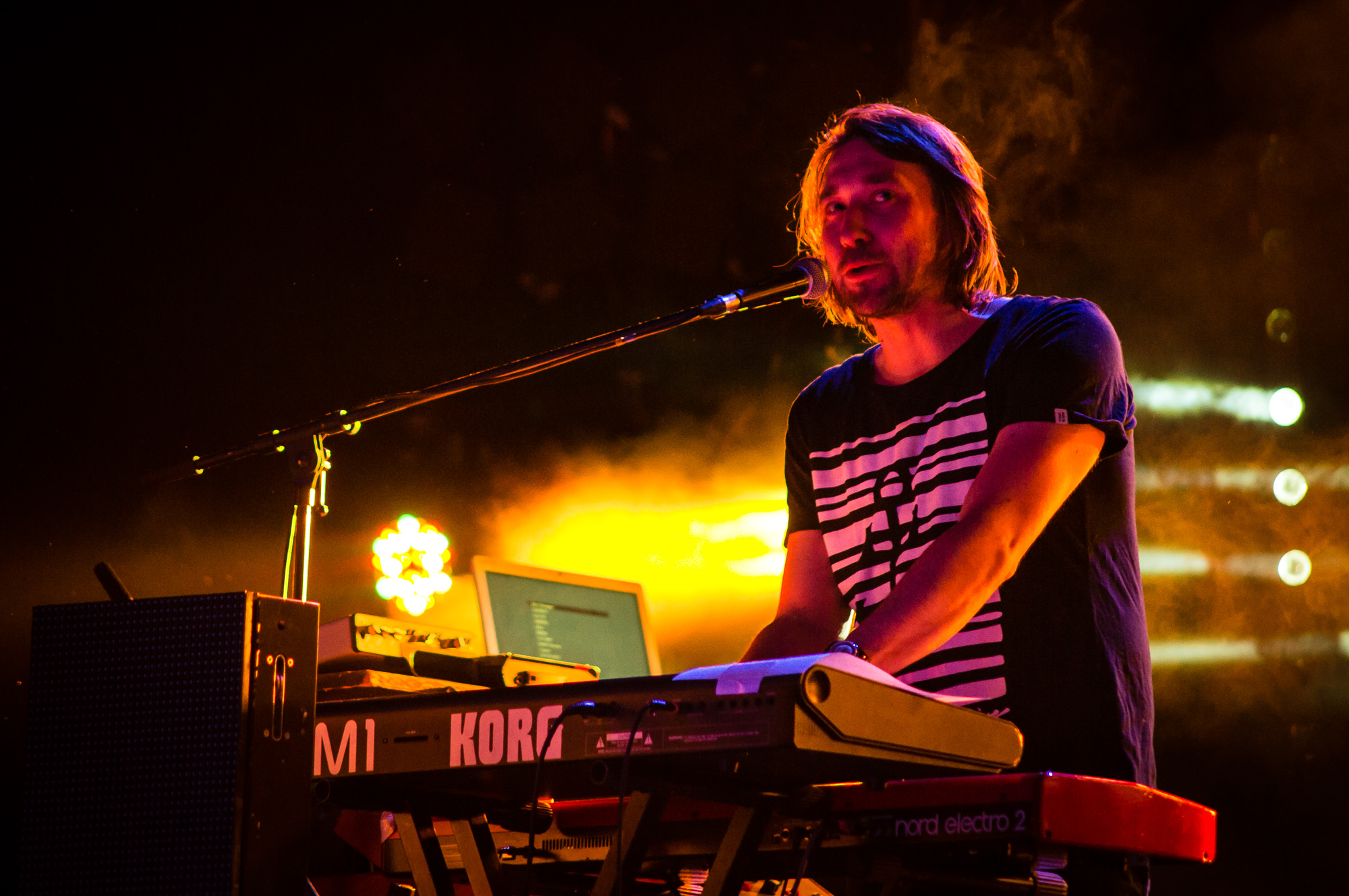
Marcin Zabrocki during Rocket Festiwal 2013 in Warsaw, Poland.

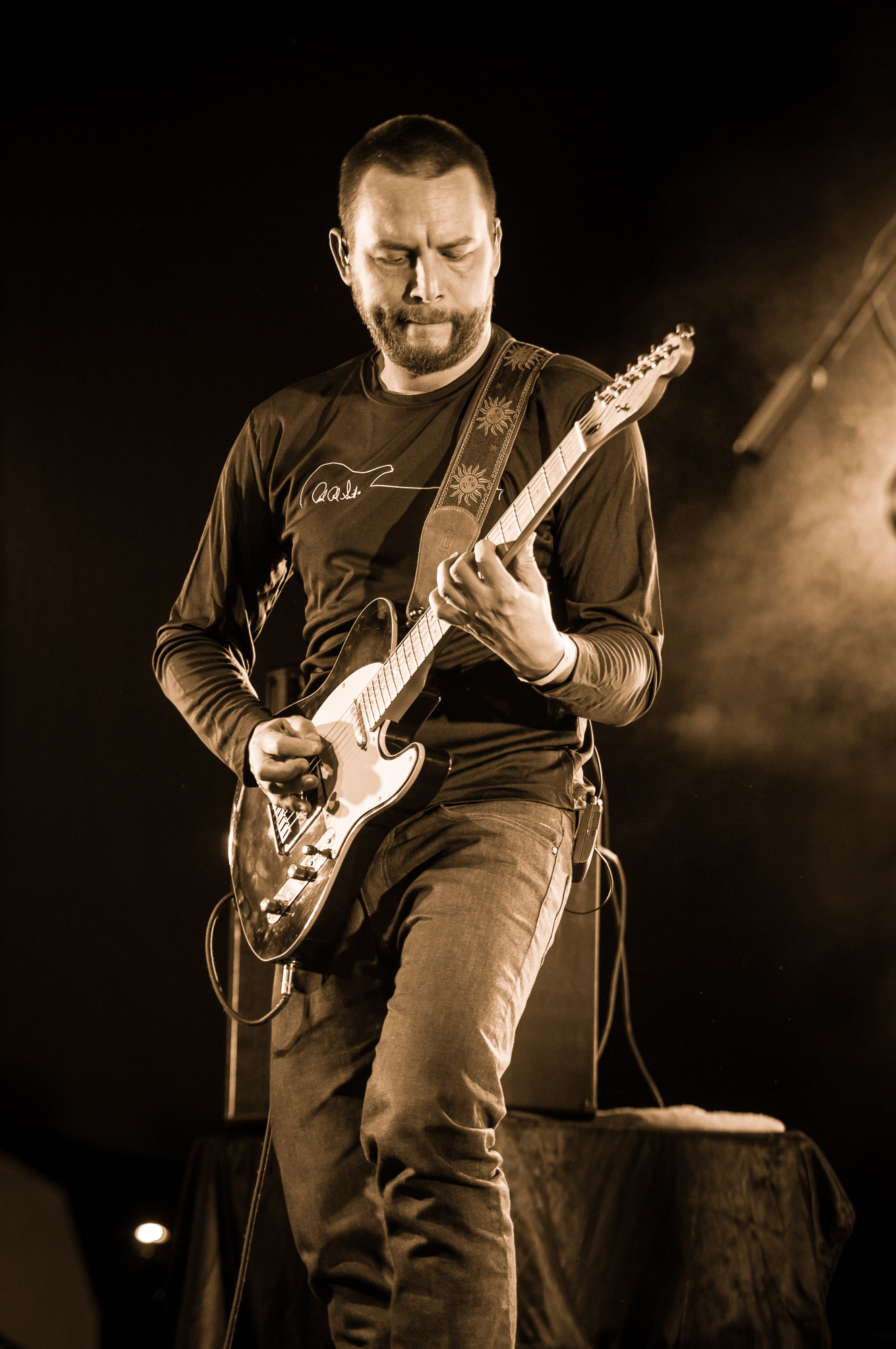
Marcin Żabiełowicz during Rocket Festiwal 2013 in Warsaw, Poland.

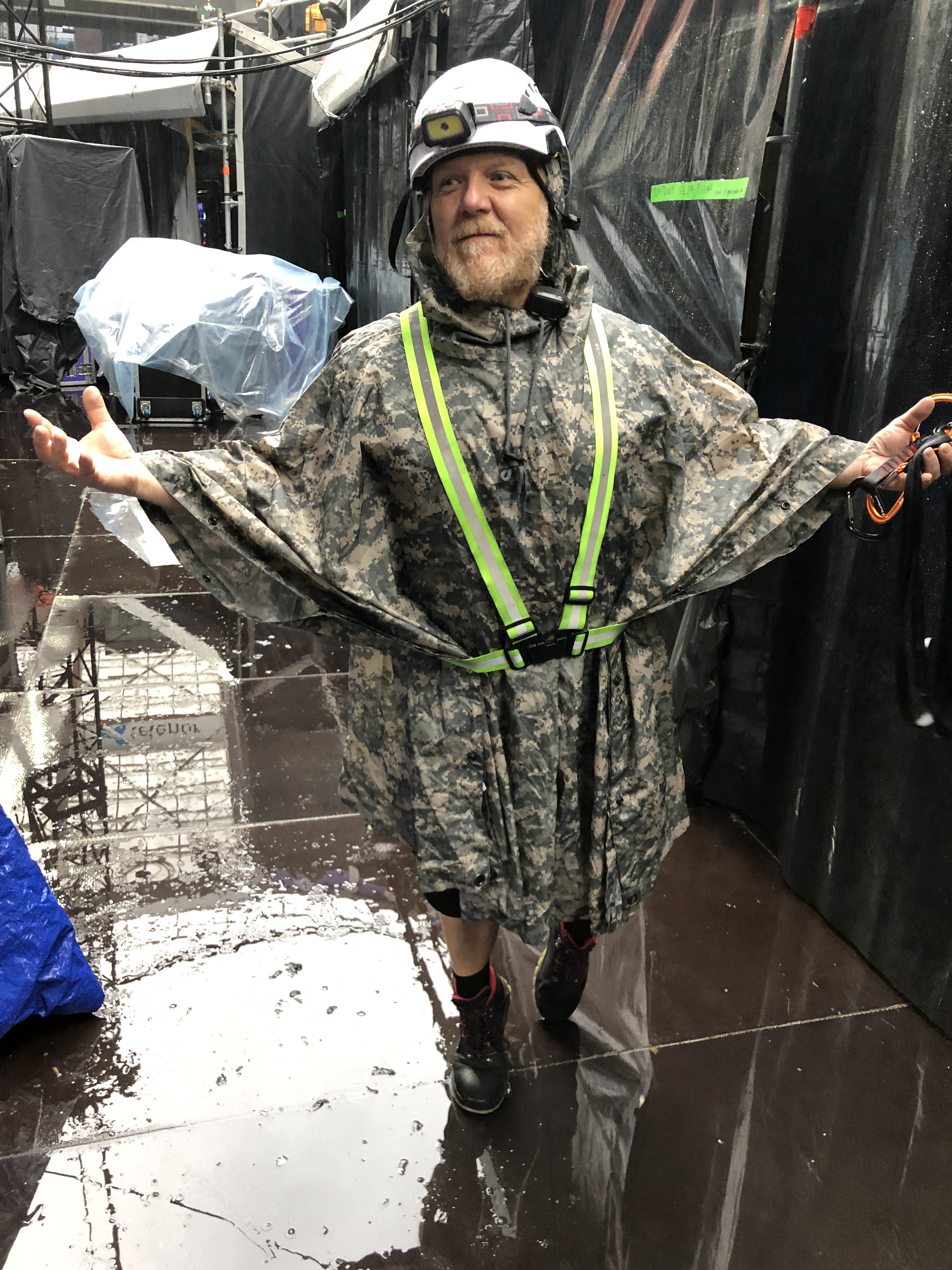
Robert Ligiewicz at the Rammstein Stadium Tour 2019 in Oslo, Norway

Hey is a Polish rock band founded in Szczecin in 1991 by guitarist Piotr Banach and singer Kasia Nosowska. They are one of the most popular Polish music acts of the 1990s.

Although Hey sometimes described themselves as the first Polish grunge band, their melodic, guitar-driven rock and eclectic appearance owed more to new wave and heavy metal influences; their first three albums contained songs in both Polish and English. During the band's mid-1990s heyday, they sold out stadiums throughout Poland, and attempted to break into the English-language market with a series of concerts overseas and an English version of their 1995 album ?. When this failed to arouse interest, the band began to write in Polish only, and gradually adopted a harder-edged, more industrial-influenced sound. Overall, the band has sold over 2.3 million album copies (as of April 2020).

In addition, Nosowska has also enjoyed a successful career as a solo artist. She has released six solo albums that derive more from an electronic style.

== Members ==
=== Current line-up ===
- Kasia Nosowska (vocals)
- Paweł Krawczyk (guitar)
- Marcin Żabiełowicz (guitar)
- Robert Ligiewicz (drums, percussion)
- Jacek Chrzanowski (bass guitar)
- Marcin Macuk (keyboards)

=== Former members ===
- Piotr Banach (guitar) (1992–1999)
- Marcin Macuk (bass guitar) (1992)

== Discography ==
=== Studio albums ===
Year	Album details	Peak chart position	Certification
Year	Album details	POL	Certification
1993	Fire: Released: 8 February 1993; Label: Izabelin Studio; Formats: LP, CD, CS, digital download	9	POL: 4× platinum
1994	Ho!: Released: 22 April 1994; Label: Izabelin Studio; Formats: CD, CS, digital download	40	POL: 3× platinum
1995	?: Released: 9 October 1995; Label: Izabelin Studio; Formats: CD, CS, digital download	—	POL: platinum
1997	Karma: Released: 5 May 1997; Label: PolyGram Poland; Formats: CD, CS	—	POL: gold
1999	Hey: Released: 4 May 1999; Label: Universal Music; Formats: CD, CS, LP	—	
2001	[sic!]: Released: 22 October 2001; Label: Warner Music Poland; Formats: CD, CS, digital download	4	
2003	Music.Music: Released: 17 November 2003; Label: Warner Music Poland; Formats: CD	1	
2005	Echosystem: Released: 21 November 2005; Label: Sony BMG; Formats: CD, CD+DVD	2	POL: platinum
2009	Miłość! Uwaga! Ratunku! Pomocy!: Released: 26 October 2009; Label: QL Music; Formats: LP, CD, CD+DVD, digital download	1	POL: 2× platinum
2012	Do rycerzy, do szlachty, doo mieszczan: Released: 6 November 2012; Label: Supersam Music; Formats: CD, LP, digital download	3	POL: platinum
2016	Błysk: Released: 22 April 2016; Label: Kayax; Formats: CD, LP, digital download	3	POL: platinum
"—" denotes a release that did not chart.

=== Remix albums ===
Year	Album details	Peak chart position
Year	Album details	POL
2010	Re-M.U.R.P.E.D.: Released: 1 June 2010; Label: QL Music; Formats: CD, digital download	11
"—" denotes a release that did not chart.

=== Extended plays ===
Year	EP details
1995	Heledore: Released: 25 May 1995; Label: Izabelin Studio; Formats: CD

=== Live albums ===
Year	Album details	Peak chart position	Certification
Year	Album details	POL	Certification
1994	Live!: Released: 6 December 1994; Label: Izabelin Studio; Formats: CD, CS	—	POL: platinum
2003	Koncertowy: Released: 17 March 2003; Label: Warner Music Poland; Formats: CD	24	
2007	MTV Unplugged: Released: 19 November 2007; Label: QL Music; Formats: CD, CD+DVD, digital download	1	POL: 3× platinum
2010	Hey – Najmniejszy Koncert Świata: Released: 19 November 2010; Label: Agora SA; Formats: Digital download	—	
2015	Hey w Filharmonii. Szczecin Unplugged: Released: 5 June 2015; Label: Kayax; Formats: CD, digital download	12	
"—" denotes a release that did not chart.

=== Video albums ===
Title	Video details	Certification
Hey – Live '93	Released: 1993; Label: Izabelin Studio; Formats: VHS	
Hey – Live '94	Released: 1994; Label: Izabelin Studio; Formats: VHS	
Hey Przystanek Woodstock 2004	Released: November 20, 2004; Label: Złoty Melon; Formats: DVD	POL: gold
Hey – Najmniejszy Koncert Świata	Released: December 3, 2010; Label: Agora SA; Formats: DVD	
