= BMG Poland =

Polish record company (1993–2004); subsidiary of Bertelsmann Music Group

- Parent company: BMG
- Founded: 1993
- Defunct: 2004
- Genre: various
- Country of origin: Warsaw, Poland
- Location: Poland

BMG Poland Sp. z o.o., was a Polish subsidiary of BMG founded in 1993 in Warsaw.

In 1996 BMG Poland purchased independent label Zic Zac owned by musician Marek Kościkiewicz of De Mono. At the time Zic Zac had 10% share on Polish music market with such artists in their roster as Kayah, Urszula Kasprzak, Andrzej Piaseczny, Formacja Nieżywych Schabuff, Elektryczne Gitary, and Varius Manx among others. Kościkiewicz became BMG Poland CEO, while Zic Zac was reformed to labels subsidiary. In 2001 label opened subsidiary Sissy Records with such artists as Andrzej Smolik, Cool Kids of Death, Futro, Jacek Lachowicz, Lenny Valentino, Novika, Old Time Radio and Ścianka in catalogue.

BMG Poland bestselling artists included Liroy and Varius Manx among others, with several albums certified Gold and Platinum in Poland.

In 2004 BMG Poland merged with Sony Music Entertainment Poland to Sony BMG Music Entertainment Poland, as of joint venture deal between Sony Music Entertainment and Bertelsmann Music Group.

== Selected artists ==
- Ania
- Alicja Janosz
- Andrzej Piaseczny
- Artur Gadowski
- De Mono
- De Su
- Dona
- Doktor Granat
- Elektryczne Gitary
- Ewelina Flinta
- Golden Life
- Jan Borysewicz & Paweł Kukiz
- Just 5
- Kasia Stankiewicz
- K.A.S.A.
- Lady Pank
- Lech Janerka
- Liroy
- Makowiecki Band
- Maciej Cieślak
- Michał Żebrowski
- Robert Janson
- Sędzia Dread
- Szymon Wydra
- Urszula Kasprzak
- Varius Manx

== See also ==
- EMI Music Poland
- PolyGram Poland
- Universal Music Poland
- Warner Music Poland
