= Monika Brodka =

Polish singer

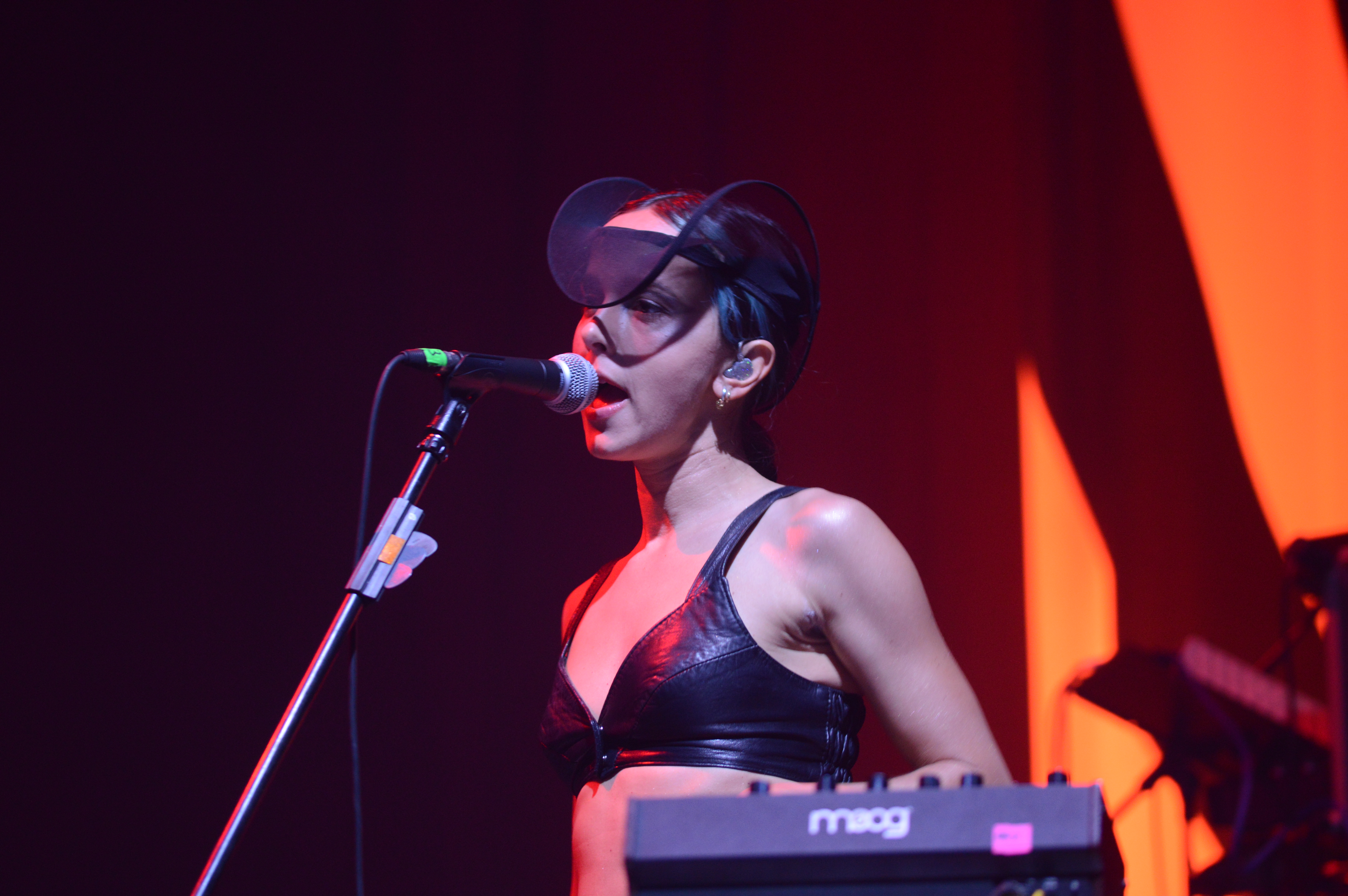
- Brodka in 2022

Background information
- Born: Monika Maria Brodka; 7 February 1988 (age 38); Żywiec, Poland
- Origin: Żywiec, Poland
- Genres: Pop; punk; rock; alternative
- Occupations: Singer; songwriter
- Instruments: Vocals; guitar; violin
- Years active: 2004–present
- Labels: BMG; Sony BMG; Sony; Kayax; PIAS
- Website: monikabrodka.com

Signature
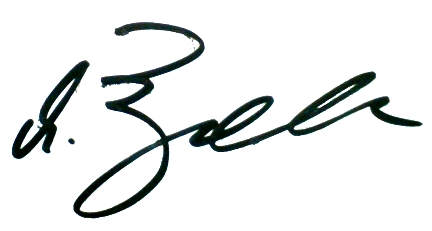

Monika Maria Brodka (born 7 February 1988) is a Polish singer, who rose to fame as the winner of the third season of Polish Pop Idol (Idol) in 2004. She has since released five albums, including the 2010 album Granda which received critical acclaim in Poland and abroad. Brodka has won ten Fryderyk awards, while her singles "Ten", "Dziewczyna Mojego Chłopaka", "Miałeś być" and "Znam Cię Na Pamięć" have all topped the official Polish Music Charts.

== History ==
=== Early career ===
After winning the 2004 edition of Polish Pop idol, Monika Brodka released her first studio record titled Album, which was certified gold. In November 2006, she released her second album, Moje piosenki (My Songs), which also turned gold.

=== Granda ===
After a four-year hiatus, Brodka's third studio album Granda was released in September 2010. The album showed a big change of musical direction, and was described in The Guardian as "drawing on electro, rock and roots music, but remaining resolutely pop in its approach and execution, the record has a vitality and adventurousness that puts most of Poland's alt-rock acts to shame". Granda was certified double platinum in Poland in November 2011.

=== LAX EP ===
In May 2012, Brodka released an extended play LAX, which was recorded at Red Bull Studios in Los Angeles together with music producer and engineer Bartosz Dziedzic. The EP contains two new songs in English, "Varsovie" and "Dancing Shoes", as well as some remixes. Brodka won the 2013 Fryderyk award for Song of the Year ("Varsovie"), and received two nominations in categories Album of the Year (LAX) and Artist of the Year.

=== Brut ===
On March 3, 2021, Brodka released the music video for her single Game Change. Brodka's fifth studio album Brut was released on May 28, 2021. In the 2021 edition of the Berlin Music Video Awards, Brodka was nominated for Best Art Director with her music video Game Change. The music video Horyzont by Piernikowski, in which Brodka features, was also selected for the official selection of the Berlin Music Video Awards for the Best Visual Effects category.

== Discography ==
=== Albums ===
Title	Album details	Peak chart positions	Certifications
Title	Album details	POL	Certifications
Album	Released: 25 October 2004; Label: BMG Poland; Formats: CD, LP, digital download, streaming	6	POL: Gold
Moje piosenki	Released: 20 November 2006; Label: Sony BMG; Formats: CD, LP, digital download, streaming	7	POL: Gold
Granda	Released: 20 September 2010; Label: Sony Music; Formats: CD, CD/DVD, LP, digital download, streaming	2	POL: 2× Platinum
Clashes	Released: 13 May 2016; Label: Kayax, Play It Again Sam; Formats: CD, LP, digital download, streaming	1	POL: Platinum
Brut	Released: 28 May 2021; Label: Kayax, Play It Again Sam; Formats: CD, LP, digital download, streaming	5	

=== Extended plays ===
Title	Album details	Peak chart positions
Title	Album details	POL
Mini Album vol. 1	Released: 27 September 2004; Label: BMG Poland; Formats: CD, digital download	2
Mini Album vol. 2	Released: 25 October 2004; Label: BMG Poland; Formats: CD, digital download	21
LAX	Released: 30 May 2012; Label: Kayax; Formats: CD/DVD, LP, digital download	—
Sadza	Released: 28 October 2022; Label: Kayax; Formats: CD, digital download	8
"—" denotes a recording that did not chart or was not released in that territory.

=== Live albums ===
Title	Album details	Peak chart positions
Title	Album details	POL
MTV Unplugged	Released: 7 December 2018; Label: Kayax, Play It Again Sam; Formats: CD, LP, digital download, streaming, box set	1

=== Singles ===
Title	Year	Peak chart positions	Certifications	Album
Title	Year	POL	Certifications	Album
"Ten"	2004	1		Album
"Dziewczyna mojego chłopaka"	2004	1		Album
"Miałeś być"	2005	1		Album (re-release)
"Znam Cię na pamięć"	2006	1		Moje piosenki
"Miał być ślub..."	2007	—		Moje piosenki
"W pięciu smakach"	2010	—		Granda
"Granda"	2010	—		Granda
"Krzyżówka dnia"	2011	—		Granda
"Varsovie"	2012	—		LAX
"Dancing Shoes (Kamp! Remix)"	2012	—		LAX
"Elektryczny" (with Dawid Podsiadło)	2014	—		Męskie Granie 2014
"Horses"	2016	—		Clashes
"Santa Muerte"	2016	—		Clashes
"Up in the Hill"	2016	—		Clashes
"My Name Is Youth"	2017	—		Clashes
"Nieboskłon" (with Tomasz Organek and Piotr Rogucki)	2017	—		Męskie Granie 2017
"Wszystko, czego dziś chcę" (with A_GIM)	2018	61	POL: 2× Platinum	Rojst (soundtrack)
"Granda" (Rework) (with The Dumplings)	2018	—		MTV Unplugged
"Varsovie" (Live)	2018	—		MTV Unplugged
"Syberia" (Live) (with Krzysztof Zalewski)	2019	—		MTV Unplugged
"Wrong Party" (with Scottibrains)	2021	—		Brut (special edition)
"Game Change"	2021	—		
"Hey Man"	2021	—		
"Ostatni" (with Tymek and Urbanski)	2021	—		Rojst ‘97 (soundtrack)
"Sadza"	2022	—		Sadza
"Monika"	2022	—		Sadza
"—" denotes a recording that did not chart or was not released in that territory.

Preceded by Krzysztof Zalewski	Idol winner Season 3 (2004)	Succeeded by Maciej Silski
