= Idol (Polish TV series) =

- Also known as: Idol Poland
- Created by: Simon Fuller
- Starring: Maciej Rock; Kuba Wojewódzki; Elżbieta Zapendowska
- Country of origin: Poland
- No. of seasons: 5

Original release
- Network: Polsat
- Release: 5 April 2002 – 18 June 2005
- Release: 15 February – 17 May 2017

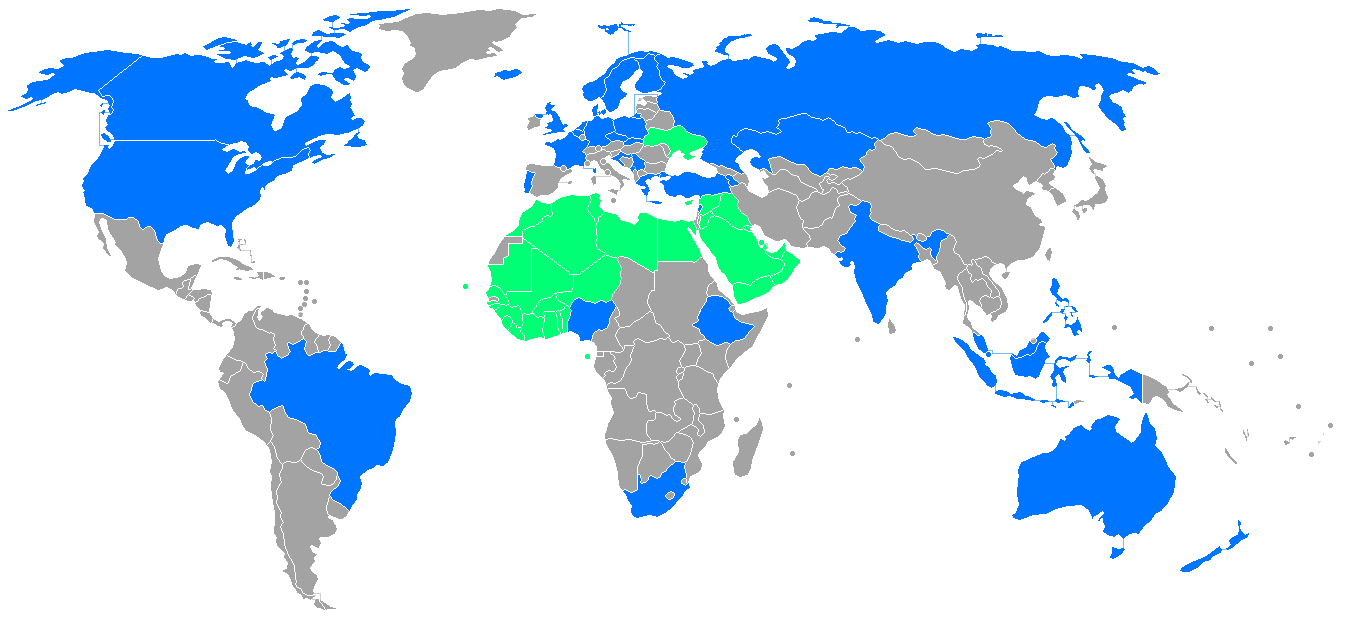

Idol is a television show on the Polish television network Polsat, based on the popular British show Pop Idol. The show is a contest to determine the best young singer in Poland. It is hosted by Maciej Rock.

In the show, people first audition but eventually the performers are narrowed down to 10 finalists, with each contestant performing live. There are four judges (or five) who provide critiques of each competitor's performance.

Viewers have two hours following the broadcast of the show to vote via telephone and SMS for their favorite contestant. On the night's results episode, the contestant with the fewest votes is sent home.

The winners of Idol were Alicja Janosz in season one, Krzysztof Zalewski in season two, Monika Brodka in season three & Maciek Silski in season four.

After a hiatus of 12 years, the show returned for its 5th season in 2017. The winner is Mariusz Dyba.

== Judges ==
Judges	Seasons				
Judges	1	2	3	4	5
Elżbieta Zapendowska	♦	♦	♦	♦	♦
Janusz Panasewicz					♦
Ewa Farna					♦
Wojciech Łuszczykiewicz					♦
Jacek Cygan	♦	♦	♦	♦	
Robert Leszczyński	♦	♦	♦	♦	
Kuba Wojewódzki	♦	♦		♦	
Marcin Prokop			♦		
Maciej Maleńczuk			♦		

== Series overview ==
Season	Episodes	Originally released	
Season	Episodes	First released	Last released
1	24	April 5, 2002	June 30, 2002
2	25	October 7, 2002	February 16, 2003
3	24	September 4, 2003	January 12, 2004
4	23	February 16, 2005	June 18, 2005
5	14	February 15, 2017	May 17, 2017
