= Kreis Gnesen =

Coordinates: 52°32′00″N 17°36′00″E

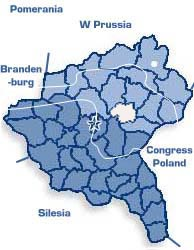

Kreis Gnesen was one of several districts of Prussia (kreise, 'counties') in the northern administrative district of Bromberg, in the Prussian province of Posen.

== Standesamter ==
Standesamt is the German name of the local civil registration offices which were established in October 1874 soon after the German Empire was formed. Births, marriages and deaths were recorded.

Standesamt	Polish spelling
Bismarcksfelde	Świniary
Falkenau	Sokolniki
Gnesen	Gniezno
Kletzko	Kłecko
Komorowo	Komorowo
Libau	Łubowo
Modliszewko	Modliszewko
Welnau	Kiszkowo
