= Polska Wieś =

Polska Wieś may refer to the following places:

- Polska Wieś, Gniezno County in Greater Poland Voivodeship (west-central Poland)
- Polska Wieś, Poznań County in Greater Poland Voivodeship (west-central Poland)
- Polska Wieś, Warmian-Masurian Voivodeship (north Poland)
