= Idol Poland season 5 =

Season of television series

Idol Poland
- Season 5
- Hosted by: Maciej Rock; Kamil Baleja
- Judges: Elżbieta Zapendowska; Janusz Panasewicz; Ewa Farna; Wojciech Łuszczykiewicz
- Winner: Mariusz Dyba
- Runner-up: Karolina Artymowicz

Release
- Original network: Polsat
- Original release: February 15 – May 17, 2017

Season chronology
- ← Previous; Season 4

Idol Poland (season 5) is the fifth season of Idol Poland.

== Finalists ==
(ages stated at time of contest)

Contestant	Age	Hometown	Voted Off	Liveshow Theme
Mariusz Dyba	28	Olsztyn	May 17, 2017	Grand Finale
Karolina Artymowicz	18	Charbowo	May 17, 2017	Grand Finale
Jakub Krystyan	23	Kraków	May 17, 2017	Grand Finale
Angelika "Żelka" Zaworka	21	Prószków	May 10, 2017	Movies / Judges' Choice
Adam Kalinowski	22	Łomża	May 3, 2017	Love Songs
Patrycja Jewsenia	21	Gdańsk	April 26, 2017	Dance
Adrian Szupke	27	Kraków	April 19, 2017	Kings & Queens of Music
Maciej Mazur	22	Szczecin	April 12, 2017	My Idol

=== Finals elimination chart ===
Stage:		Semi	Finals					
Week:		05/04	12/04	19/04	26/04	03/05	10/05	17/05
Place	Contestant	Result						
1	Mariusz Dyba	Adv						Winner
2	Karolina Artymowicz	Adv						Runner-up
3	Jakub Krystyan	Adv					Btm2	Elim
4	Angelika "Żelka" Zaworka	Adv				Btm2	Elim	
5	Adam Kalinowski	Adv		Btm2	Btm2	Elim		
6	Patrycja Jewsenia	Adv	Btm2		Elim			
7	Adrian Szupke	Adv		Elim				
8	Maciej Mazur	Adv	Elim					
9	Agata Karczewska	Elim						
10	Jowita Łasecka	Elim						
11	Szymon Borkowski	Elim						
12	Julita Trautsolt	Elim						

Legend
Female	Male	Top 12	Top 8	Winner

Female	Male	Safe	Bottom two	Eliminated

== Live Show Details ==
=== Pre Live Show (5 April 2017) ===
Artist	Song (original artists)	Result
Adam Kalinowski	"Urke" (Wilki)	Advanced
Adrian Szupke	"Miasto budzi się" (Yugopolis)	Advanced
Agata Karczewska	"Znalazłam" (O.N.A.)	Eliminated
Angelika Zaworka	"Zegar" (Edyta Bartosiewicz)	Advanced
Jakub Krystyan	"Please Forgive Me" (Bryan Adams)	Advanced
Jowita Łasecka	"Set Fire to the Rain" (Adele)	Eliminated
Julita Trautsolt	"No One" (Alicia Keys)	Eliminated
Karolina Artymowicz	"Fields of Gold" (Sting)	Advanced
Maciej Mazur	"Locked Out of Heaven" (Bruno Mars)	Advanced
Mariusz Dyba	"I Can't Stop Thinking About You" (Sting)	Advanced
Patrycja Jewsenia	"Lost on You" (LP)	Advanced
Szymon Borkowski	"Feel" (Robbie Williams)	Eliminated

=== Live Show 1 (12 April 2017) ===
Theme: My Idol

Artist	Song (original artists)	Result
Adam Kalinowski	"Sweet Child o' Mine" (Guns N' Roses)	Safe
Adrian Szupke	"Born to Be Wild" (Steppenwolf)	Safe
Angelika Zaworka	"Ain't Your Mama" (Jennifer Lopez)	Safe
Jakub Krystyan	"Dance Me to the End of Love" (Leonard Cohen)	Safe
Karolina Artymowicz	"Nieznajomy" (Dawid Podsiadło)	Safe
Maciej Mazur	"Fire in the Rain" (Måns Zelmerlöw)	Eliminated
Mariusz Dyba	"Wicked Game" (Chris Isaak)	Safe
Patrycja Jewsenia	"Takiego chłopaka" (Mikromusic)	Bottom two

=== Live Show 2 (19 April 2017) ===
Theme: Kings & Queens of Music

Artist	Song (original artists)	Result
Adam Kalinowski	"Another One Bites the Dust" (Queen)	Bottom two
Adrian Szupke	"Light My Fire" (The Doors)	Eliminated
Angelika Zaworka	"The Best" (Tina Turner)	Safe
Jakub Krystyan	"Fly Me to the Moon" (Frank Sinatra)	Safe
Karolina Artymowicz	"Your Song" (Elton John)	Safe
Mariusz Dyba	"Layla" (Derek and the Dominos)	Safe
Patrycja Jewsenia	"Nothing Compares 2 U" (Sinéad O'Connor)	Safe

=== Live Show 3 (26 April 2017) ===
Theme: Dance

Artist	Song (original artists)	Result
Adam Kalinowski	"September" (Earth, Wind & Fire)	Bottom two
Angelika Zaworka	"Toxic" (Britney Spears)	Safe
Jakub Krystyan	"You're the First, the Last, My Everything" (Barry White)	Safe
Karolina Artymowicz	"Don't Stop the Music" (Rihanna)	Safe
Mariusz Dyba	"Love Me Again" (John Newman)	Safe
Patrycja Jewsenia	"Hot Stuff" (Donna Summer)	Eliminated

=== Live Show 4 (3 May 2017) ===
Theme: Love Songs

Artist	Song (original artists)	Result
Adam Kalinowski	"This Love" (Maroon 5)	Eliminated
Angelika Zaworka	"Diamonds" (Rihanna)	Bottom two
Jakub Krystyan	"Always On My Mind" (Willie Nelson)	Safe
Karolina Artymowicz	"Give Me Love" (Ed Sheeran)	Safe
Mariusz Dyba	"One" (U2)	Safe

=== Live Show 5: Semi-final (10 May 2017) ===
Theme: Movies/Judge's Choice

Artist	First song (original artists)	Second song	Result
Angelika Zaworka	"It's Raining Men" (The Weather Girls)	"Lipstick on the Glass" (Maanam)	Eliminated
Jakub Krystyan	"Oh, Pretty Woman" (Roy Orbison)	"Human" (Rag'n'Bone Man)	Bottom two
Karolina Artymowicz	"The Shoop Shoop Song (It's in His Kiss)" (Cher)	"Pocałuj noc" (Varius Manx)	Safe
Mariusz Dyba	"Iris" (Goo Goo Dolls)	"Take Me to Church" (Hozier)	Safe

=== Live final (17 May 2017) ===
Artist	First song	Second song	Third song	Result
Jakub Krystyan	"Englishman in New York"	"Ślady"	"Listy do M."	Third place
Karolina Artymowicz	"Little Talks"	"All I Want"	"Zanim pójdę"	Runner-up
Mariusz Dyba	"Hold Back the River"	"Creep"	"Pocztówka z Kosmosu"	Winner
