= Kłecko Hillfort (Grodzisko Barbara) =

Medieval fortified settlement in Poland

Kłecko Hillfort Grodzisko Barbara
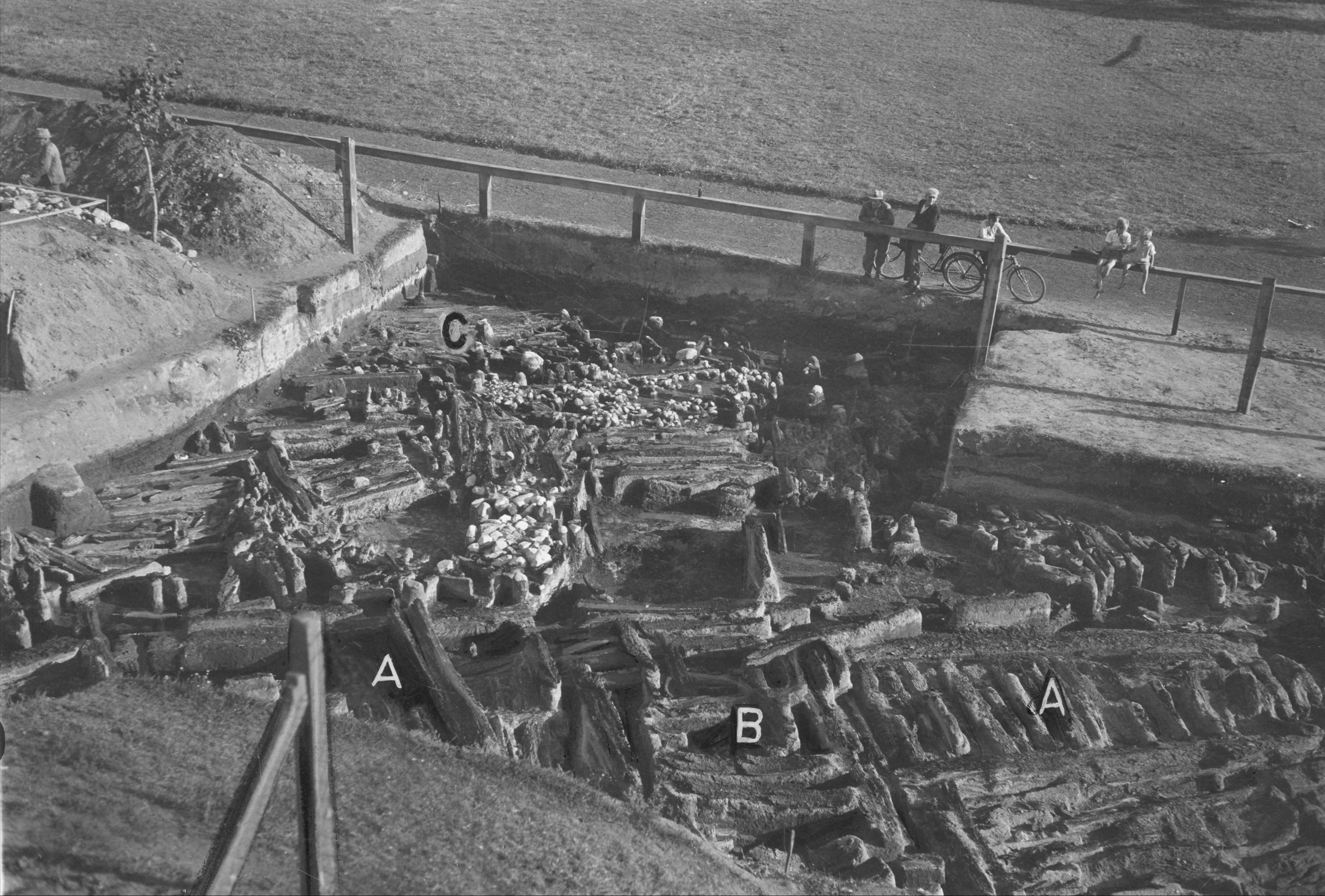
- View of the remains of the settlement, discovered during excavations in 1937

- Location within Poland Location within Greater Poland Voivodeship
- 52°38′14″N 17°26′44″E
- Location: Kłecko, Poland

History
- Built: 10th century
- Demolished: 1331

Kłecko Hillfort (Grodzisko Barbara) is an early medieval gord dating back to the formation of the Polish state in the 10th century, located between the Gorzuchowskie and Kłeckie lakes on the Gniezno-Wągrowiec road. The gord takes the form of a hillfort of an oval shape with preserved dimensions of about 40 x 35 m.

== Description ==
The hillfort was surrounded by a defensive embankment with a grate structure and gatehouse. Inside the building, a circular street ran along the embankments, and dense residential buildings were located along the transverse streets.

The hillfort was established in wetlands near the Mała Wełna River, on a trading road leading to Pomerania, and at the same time in the center of a large settlement from the early Middle Ages. Grodzisko experienced expansion in the second half of the 10th century during the rulership of Mieszko I, constituting an important point in the defence and administration of the early Piast state.

The hillfort had settlements as well as servant villages, including Wilkowyja, Świniary, and Łagiewniki. Recent research in 2012 was conducted to determine whether the hillfort played a more important role in the Piast state than previously assumed, i.e. whether it was a stronghold similar to the ranks of Grzybowo or Giecz.

In the 13th century, a small castle was built on the site and was destroyed in the 14th century during the invasion of the Teutonic Knights.

In the 17th century, the wooden church of St. Barbara was built on the site, from which today's name comes - Grodzisko Barbara.

== Archaeological research ==
The accidental discovery of wooden and stone structures took place in 1937 during the construction of a sports field. Initial archaeological research on behalf of the University of Poznań was carried out in the settlement by Witold Hensel, then a young assistant to Professor Józef Kostrzewski

In 2012, new limited-area archaeological research of the settlement was conducted under the direction of Tomasz Janiak from the Museum of the Origins of the Polish State in Gniezno. These studies found the hillfort had a distinct, older phase, tentatively dated to the turn of the 9th and 10th centuries.

== Gallery ==
Photos showing the remains of the settlement discovered during excavations in 1937.

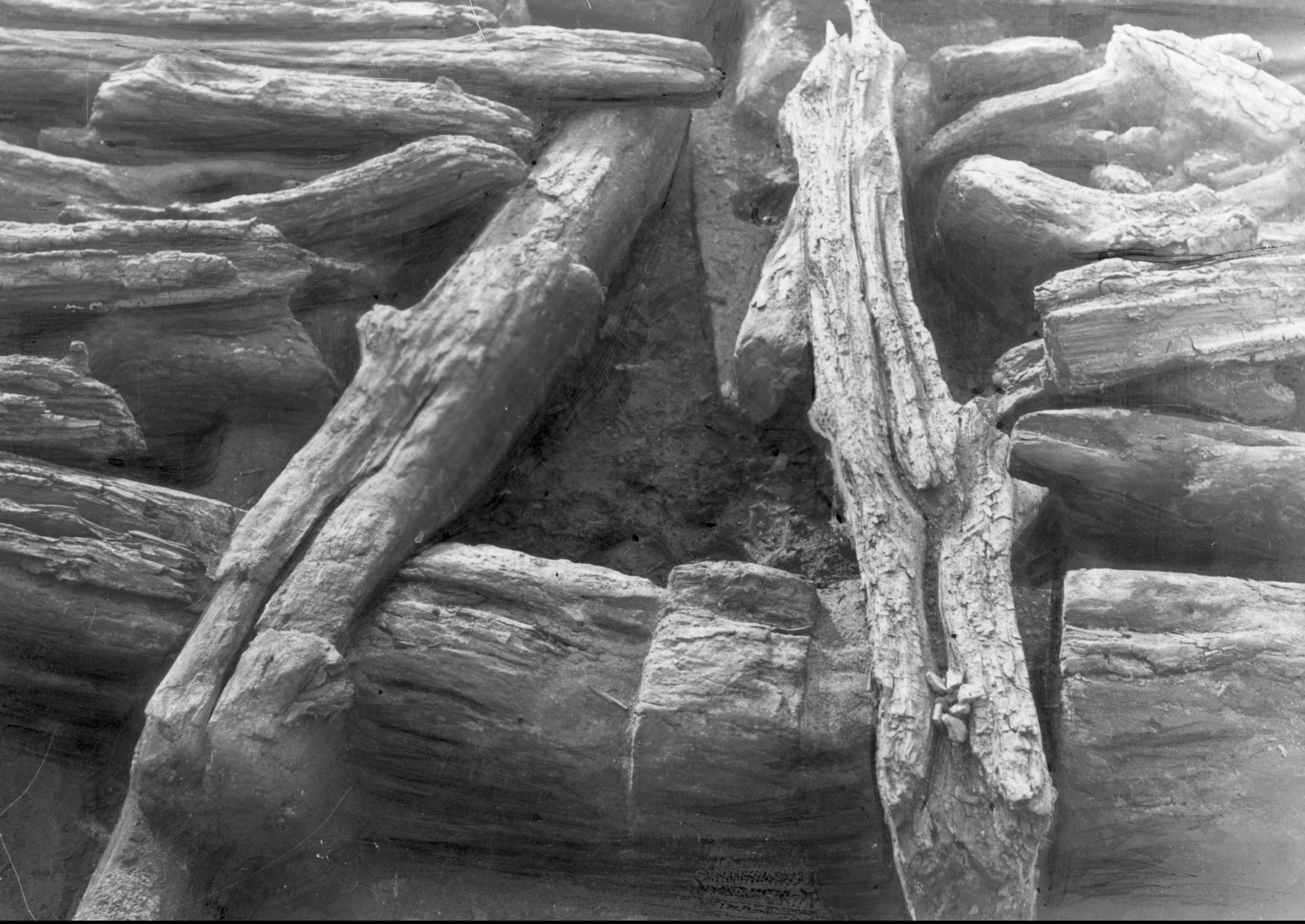

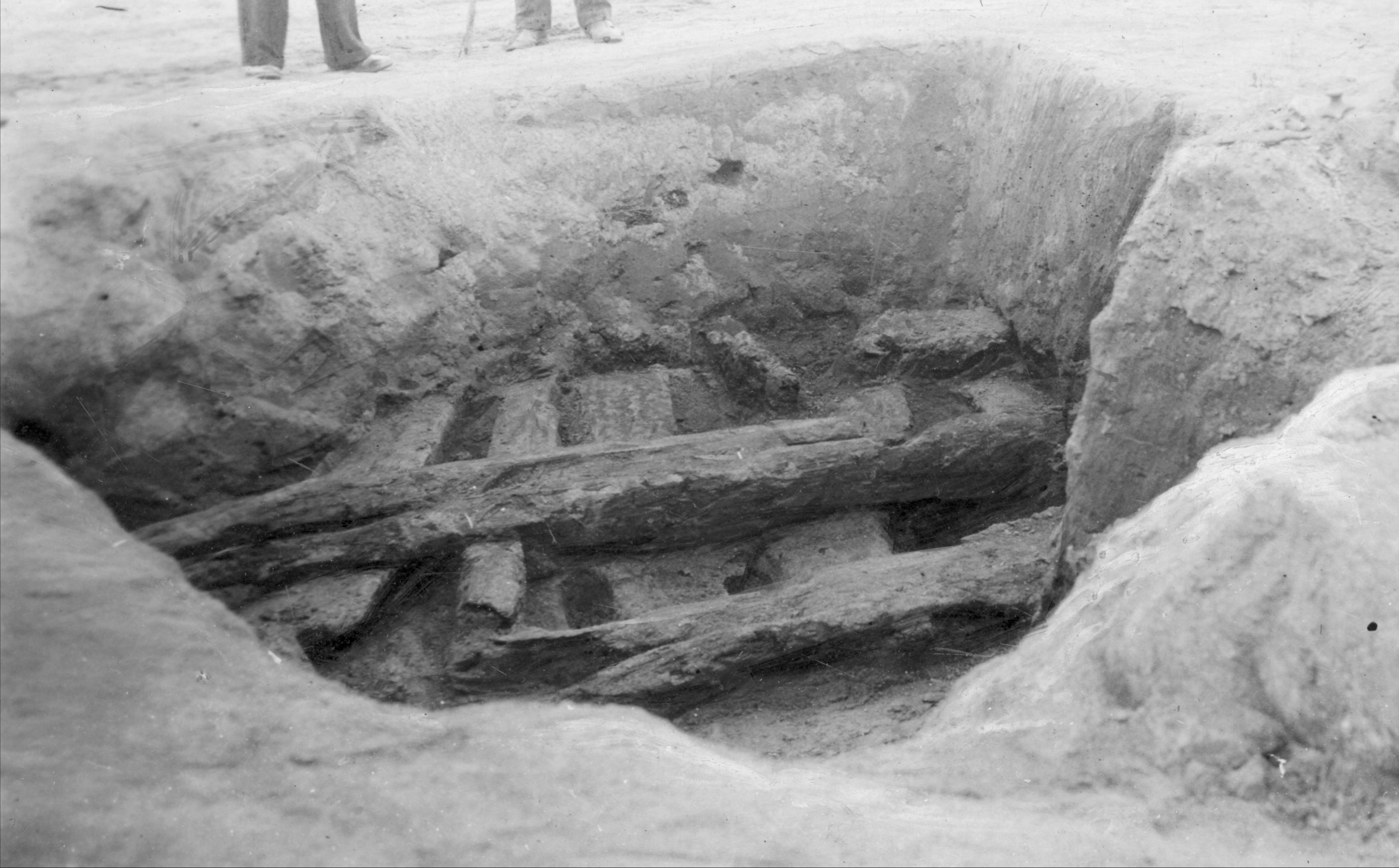

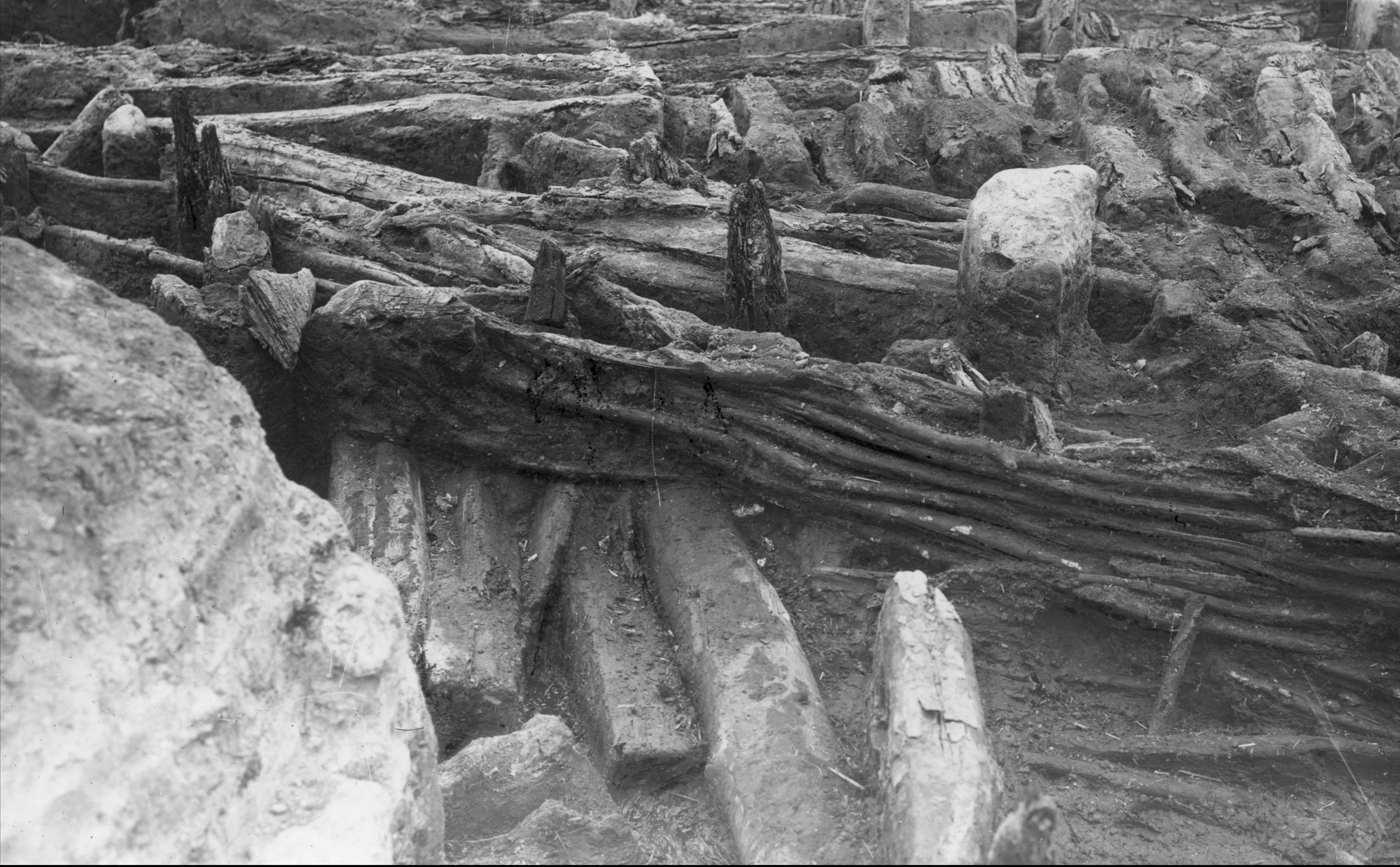

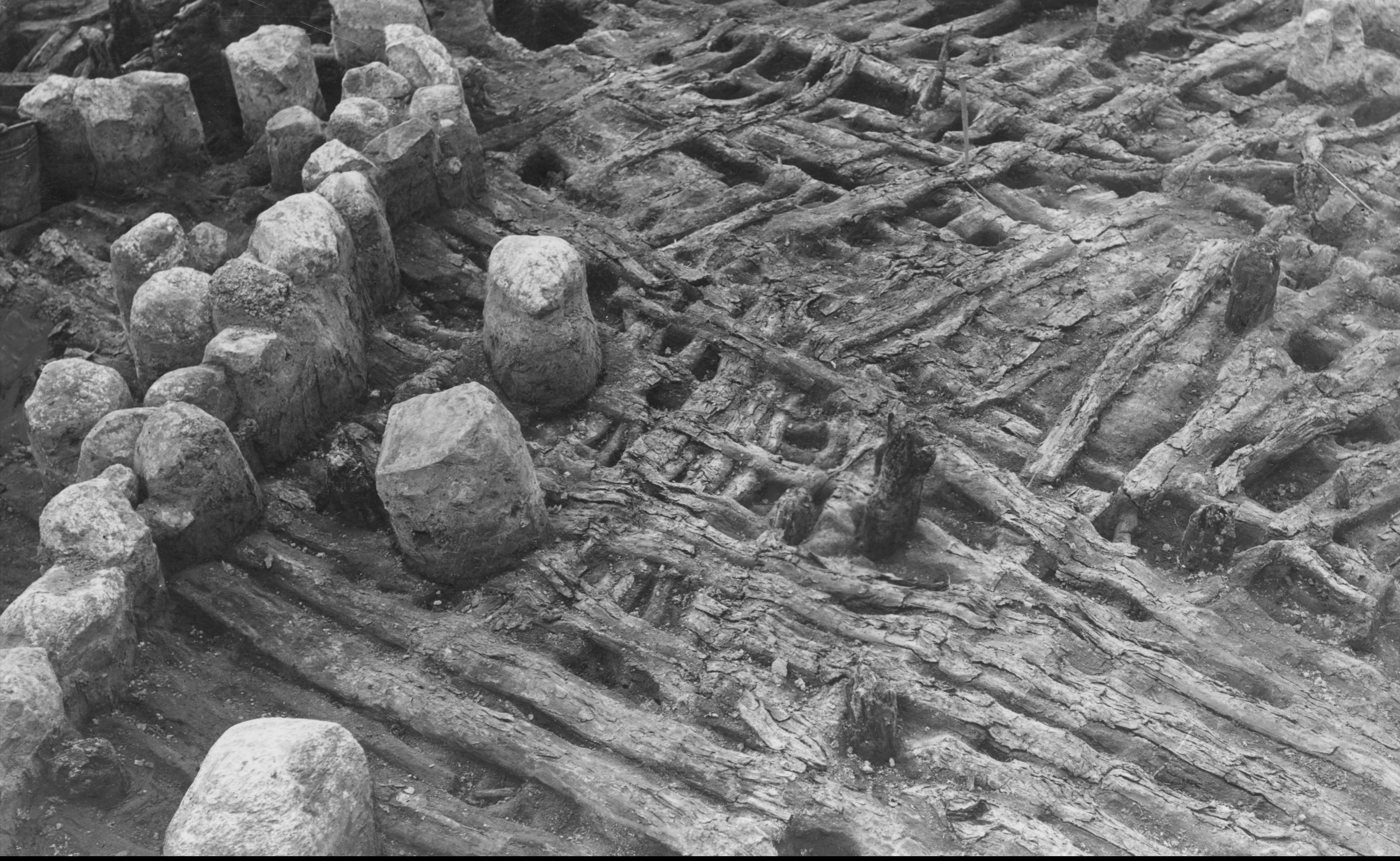

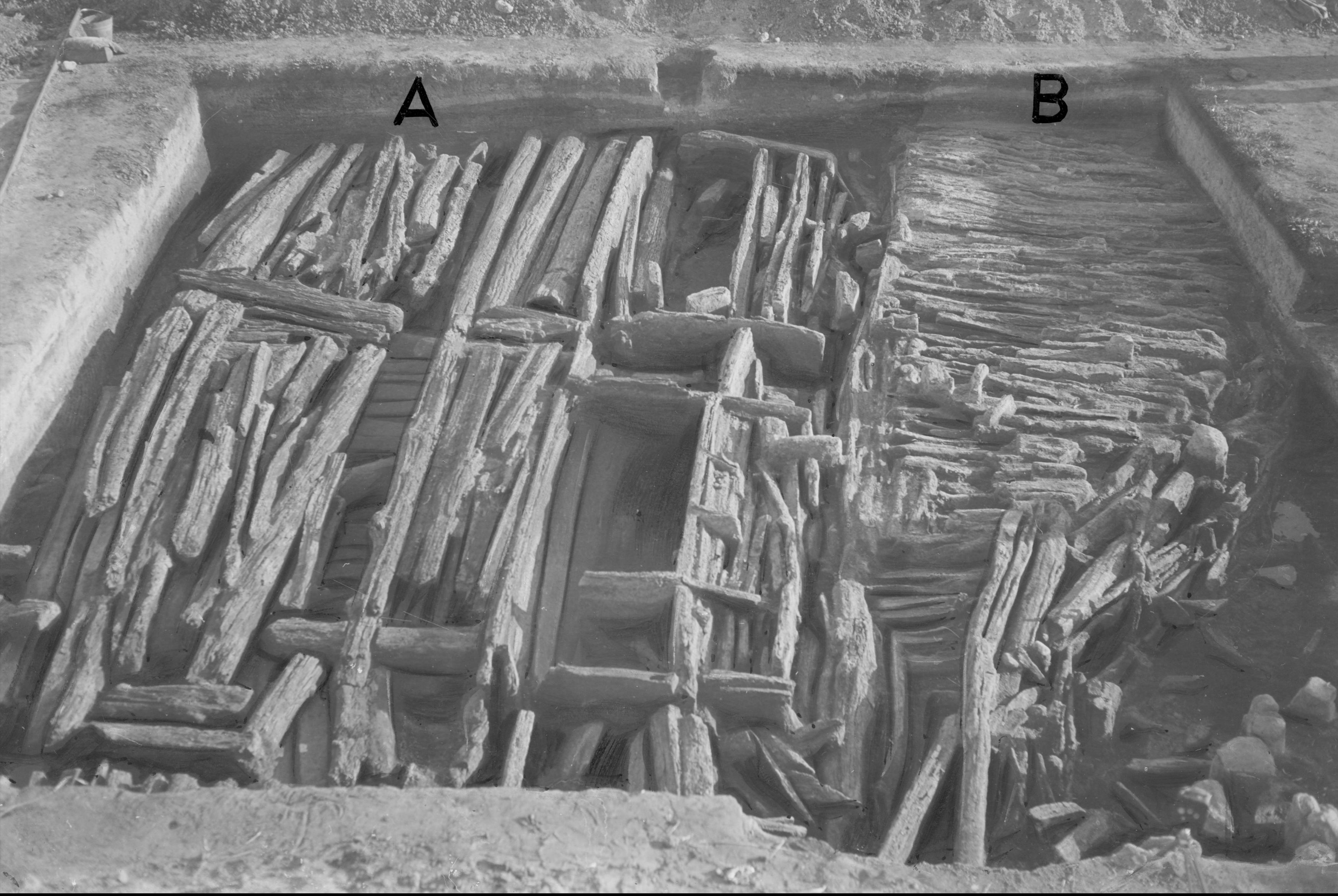

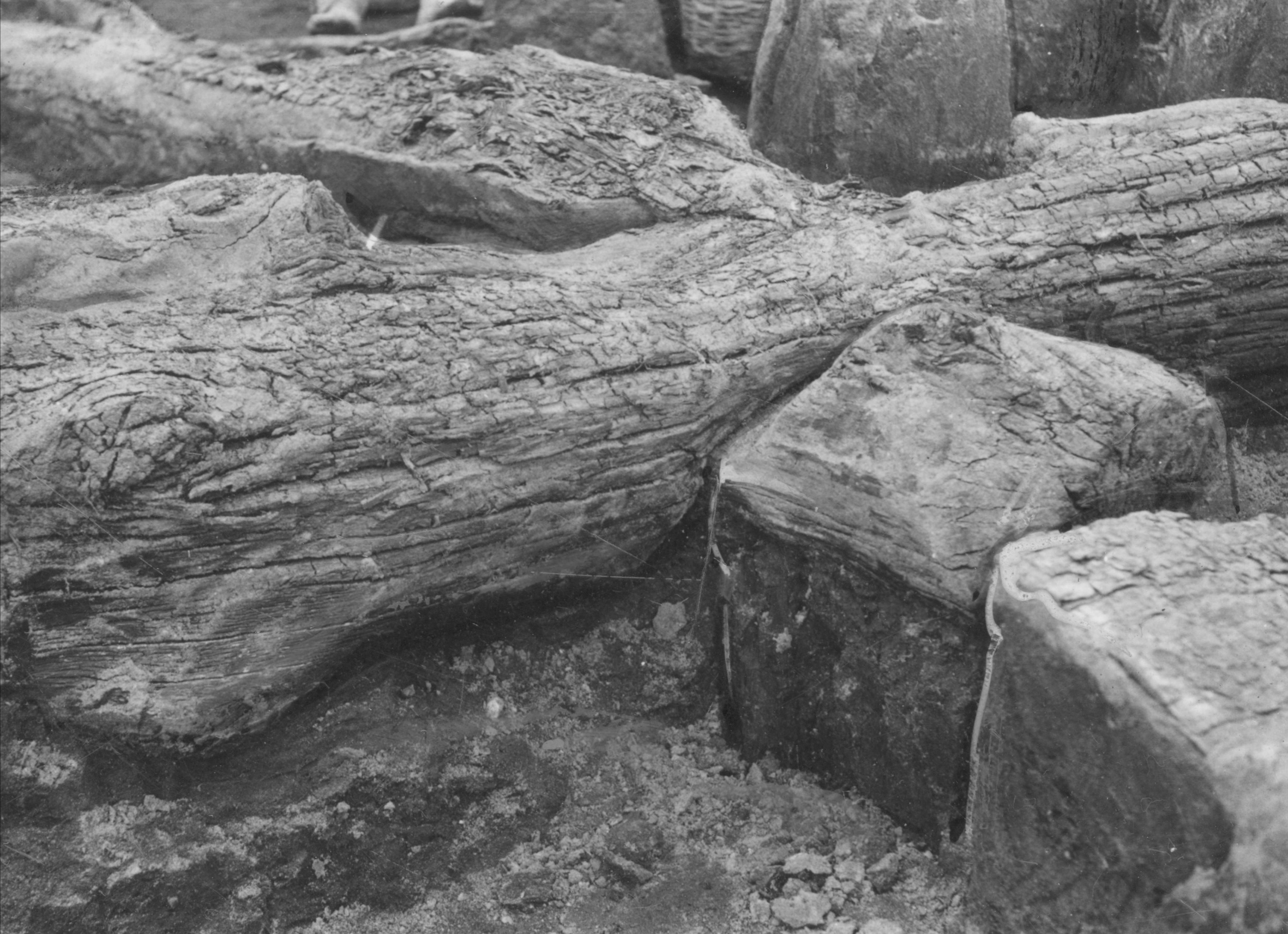

== Present state ==
The remains of the defensive embankment, up to 3 meters high, are visible to this day.

== Timeline ==
- 10th century - founding of the Kłecko hillfort
- 13th century - a small castle is built on the site of the former stronghold
- 1308 - siege of the castle by Biberstein's army
- 1331 - the stronghold in Kłecko is plundered and burned by the Teutonic army
- 1616 - on the ruins of the settlement, the small wooden church of St. Barbara is built
- 1788 - the church of St. Barbara is demolished
- until 1852 - a Catholic cemetery is established
- 19th century - a road towards Wągrowiec is built, crossing the settlement area
- 1937 - leveling works, discovery of the settlement, and first archaeological research
- 1939 - 1941 (WW2) - partial destruction of the settlement during the occupation of Poland
- 2012 - contemporary archaeological works
