= Bojanice =

Bojanice may refer to the following places in Poland:

- Bojanice, Lower Silesian Voivodeship (south-west Poland)
- Bojanice, Gniezno County in Greater Poland Voivodeship (west-central Poland)
- Bojanice, Leszno County in Greater Poland Voivodeship (west-central Poland)
