= Waliszewo =

Waliszewo may refer to the following places:

- Waliszewo, Greater Poland Voivodeship (west-central Poland)
- Waliszewo, Sławno County in West Pomeranian Voivodeship (north-west Poland)
- Waliszewo, Stargard County in West Pomeranian Voivodeship (north-west Poland)
