= Claire Dux =

German opera singer

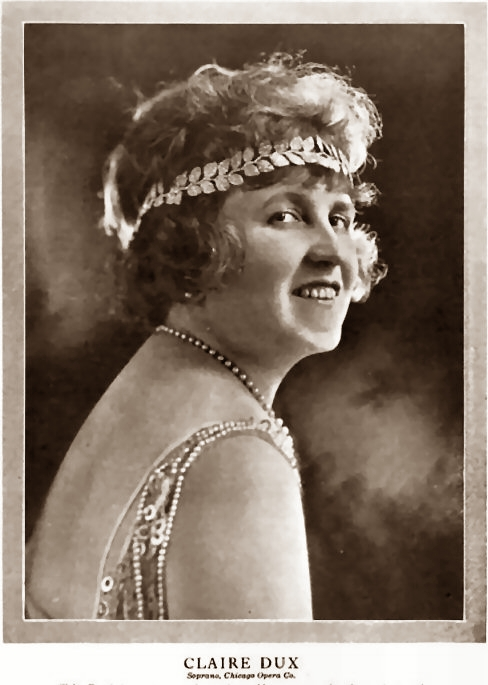
- The Theatre Magazine, February 1922
- Born: Clara Auguste Dux; 2 August 1885; Witkowo, Prussia (now Poland)
- Died: 8 October 1967 (aged 82); Chicago, Illinois, US
- Occupation(s): Soprano opera and concert singer
- Spouse(s): Wilhelm Alfred Imperatori; Hans Albers; Charles H. Swift

Claire Dux (2 August 1885 – 8 October 1967) was an operatic and concert soprano with a successful career in continental Europe, England, and the United States.

== Early life ==
Clara Auguste Dux was born in the village Witkowo in the county of Gnesen (today Gniezno); that area was part of the Kingdom of Prussia's Province of Posen from 1815 until 1920. Alan Blyth calls her Polish, other sources call her German, The New York Times called her Swiss in 1920. Both of her parents were musical, her mother was related to Clara Schumann. At the age of 12, Dux sang Gretel in a school production of Humperdinck's Hänsel und Gretel.

== Career ==
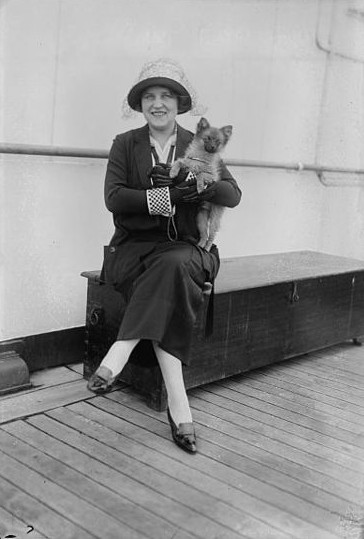
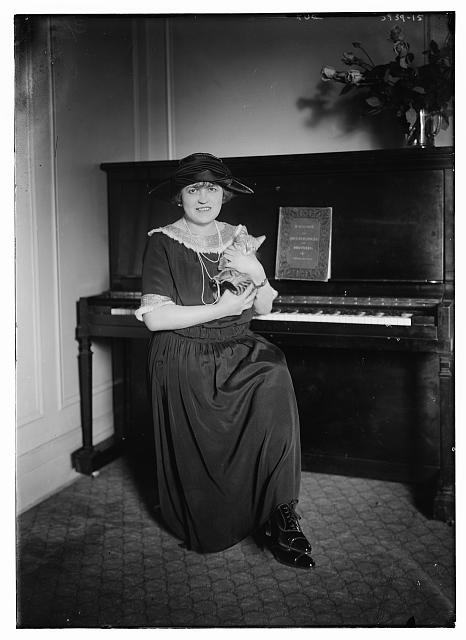
Claire Dux

She went to Bromberg (today Bydgoszcz) where she started to study singing. Later she went to Berlin where she studied singing with Adolf Deppe and Maria Schwadtke, a student of Marianne Brandt, and to Milan where she studied with Teresa Arkel. Dux made her professional debut in 1906 at the Cologne Opera as Pamina in Mozart's The Magic Flute. Other roles in Cologne included Mimì in Puccini's La bohème, and she gained international reputation through European tours.

During a guest appearance at the Berlin State Opera in 1909, she sang Mimì opposite Enrico Caruso. From 1911 until 1918, she was a member of the Berlin State Opera. There, she sang Sophie in the first Berlin performance of Richard Strauss' Der Rosenkavalier, which impressed Thomas Beecham so much that he invited her to sing that role at the opera's first performance in London at the Royal Opera House in 1913.

Dux had made her London debut in 1911 with Thomas Beecham at His Majesty's Theatre. During the years from 1918 until 1921, Dux sang mostly in concert recitals and toured the Royal Swedish Opera in Stockholm. In 1921, she became a member of the Chicago Civic Opera where she debuted as Nedda in Leoncavallo's Pagliacci; she remained there for the rest of her career, although she returned to Europe occasionally as a guest artist.

== Personal life ==
Dux was married three times: first to a writer, Wilhelm Alfred Imperatori, then briefly to the German actor Hans Albers. In August 1926 she married Charles H. Swift, son of the founder of Swift & Company, Gustavus Franklin Swift – benefactor of the University of Chicago and the Newberry Library. The Newberry Library gained through her estate the manuscript of Mozart's "Conservati fedele". The Music Department of the University of Chicago named a professorship after her: the Claire Dux Swift Distinguished Service Professor of Music and the Humanities. Finally, in 1950, she married banker and art collector Hans von der Marwitz.

== Recordings ==
In 1925, Dux was part of one of the first opera broadcasts in Germany when the station Funk-Stunde Berlin broadcast Flotow's Martha. She recorded works with Pathé, Odeon, Polydor, and Brunswick.

- Lebendige Vergangenheit, 19 arias; review at AllMusic
