= Ivan Dikov =

Russian politician born 1833

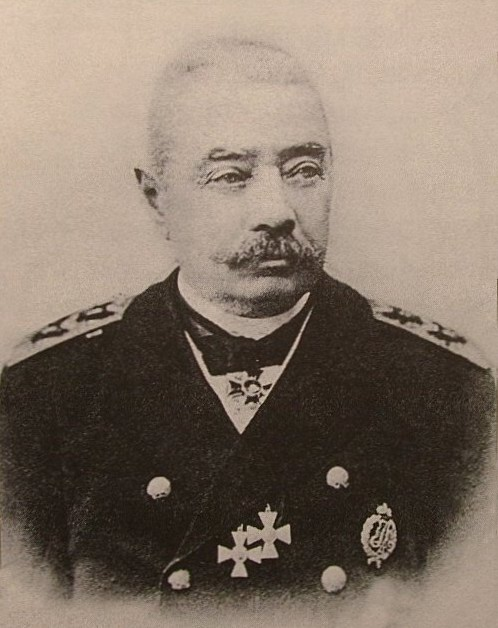
Ivan Dikov sometime between 1894–1905

Ivan Mikhailovich Dikov (Russian: Иван Михайлович Диков; Ivan Mikhaylovich Dikov) (17 July 1833 – October 1914) was a Russian Admiral and hydrographer. He served as Minister of the Navy from 1907 to 1909.

== Biography ==
Ivan Dikov was born in 1833 in Kherson province. In May 1854, Dikov and other cadets went to Sevastopol for naval practice aboard the ship 12 Apostles. In September 1854, after the Battle of Alma during the Crimean War, Dikov voluntarily remained in the besieged Sevastopol and fought in the Malakhov Kurgan and later the city's 3rd Bastion. During the siege, he was awarded the Georgievsky Cross for his bravery.

In 1856, he received his first officer rank of midshipman and joined the 30th Naval Crew. In 1859 to 1860, he conducted magnetic and hydrographic surveys of the Black Sea, measuring magnetic declination and inclination at dozens of locations and discovering a magnetic anomaly.

He published scientific works in Morskoi Sbornik in 1861, 1863 and 1876. From 1862 till 1864, he participated in the Caucasian War aboard the corvette Krechet and received several decorations, including the Orders of St. Stanislaus and St. Anna.

In 1871, he was appointed assistant director of the Black Sea and Azov lighthouses. In 1873, he was awarded the Order of St. Stanislaus for his hydrographic work.

During the Russo-Turkish War of 1877–1878 he took part in the defense of Ochakov, Sevastopol, and Kerch. He oversaw the Danube Naval Fleet's special unit that assisted with the land troop assault of Sulin. He was awarded the Order of Saint George 4th Degree for the battle at Sulin on 27 September 1877 in which they used maneuvering mine fields to destroy a Turkish gunboat.

From 1878 to 1879, he served as flag-captain to the commander-in-chief of the Russian army.

He was promoted to Rear Admiral in 1886, Vice Admiral in 1895 and in 1905, he was promoted to Admiral after the Russo-Japanese War.
