= Działyń, Greater Poland Voivodeship =

Działyń
- Village
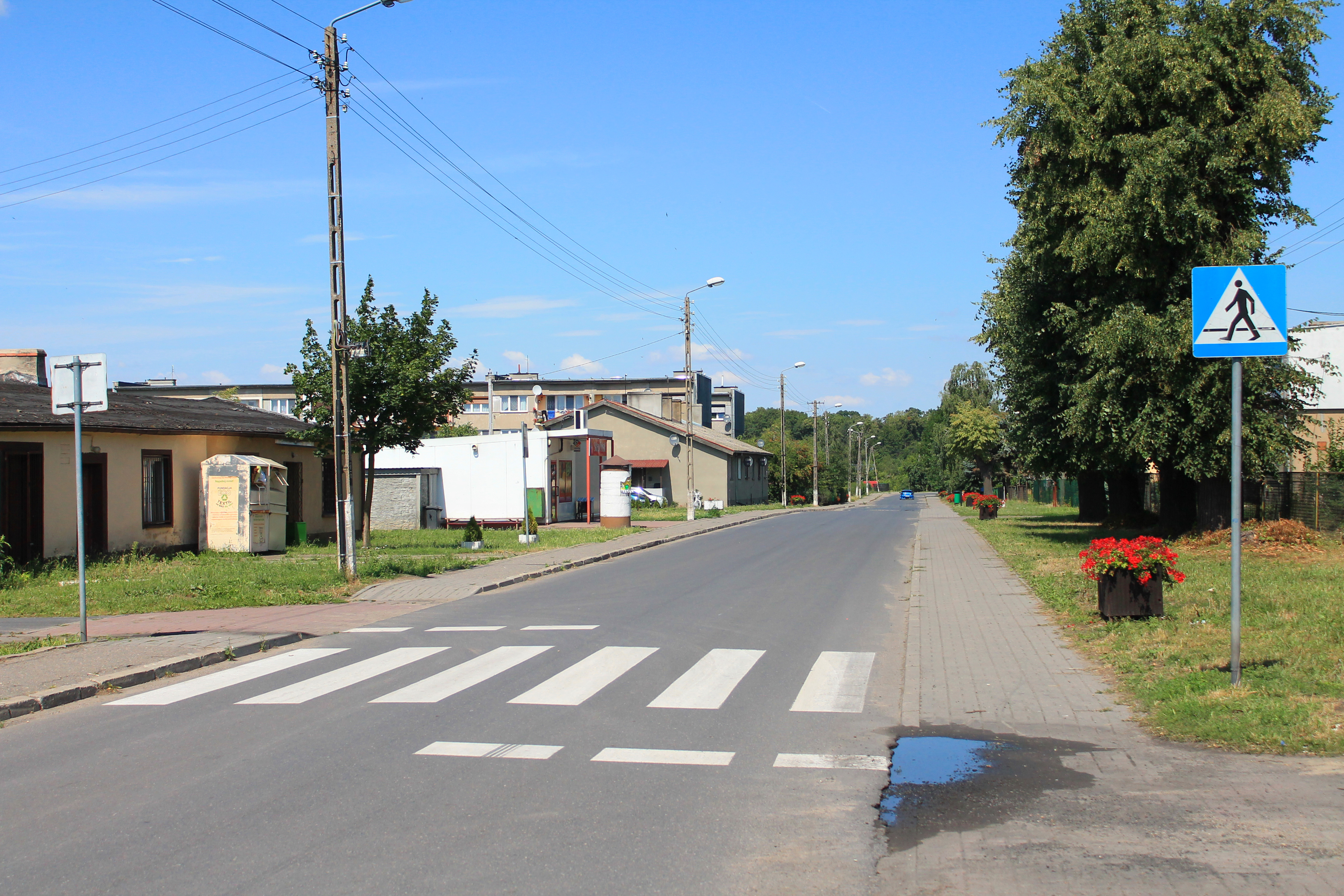
- Zebra crossing in Działyń

- Location within Poland
- Coordinates: 52°35′39″N 17°29′28″E
- Country: Poland
- Voivodeship: Greater Poland
- County: Gniezno
- Gmina: Kłecko
- Population: 840

Działyń [ˈd͡ʑawɨɲ] is a village in the administrative district of Gmina Kłecko, within Gniezno County, Greater Poland Voivodeship, in west-central Poland.

It was the death-place of Wirydianna Fiszerowa, known for her memoirs of 18th and 19th century Poland, in 1826.
