= Dębnica, Gniezno County =

Dębnica
- Village
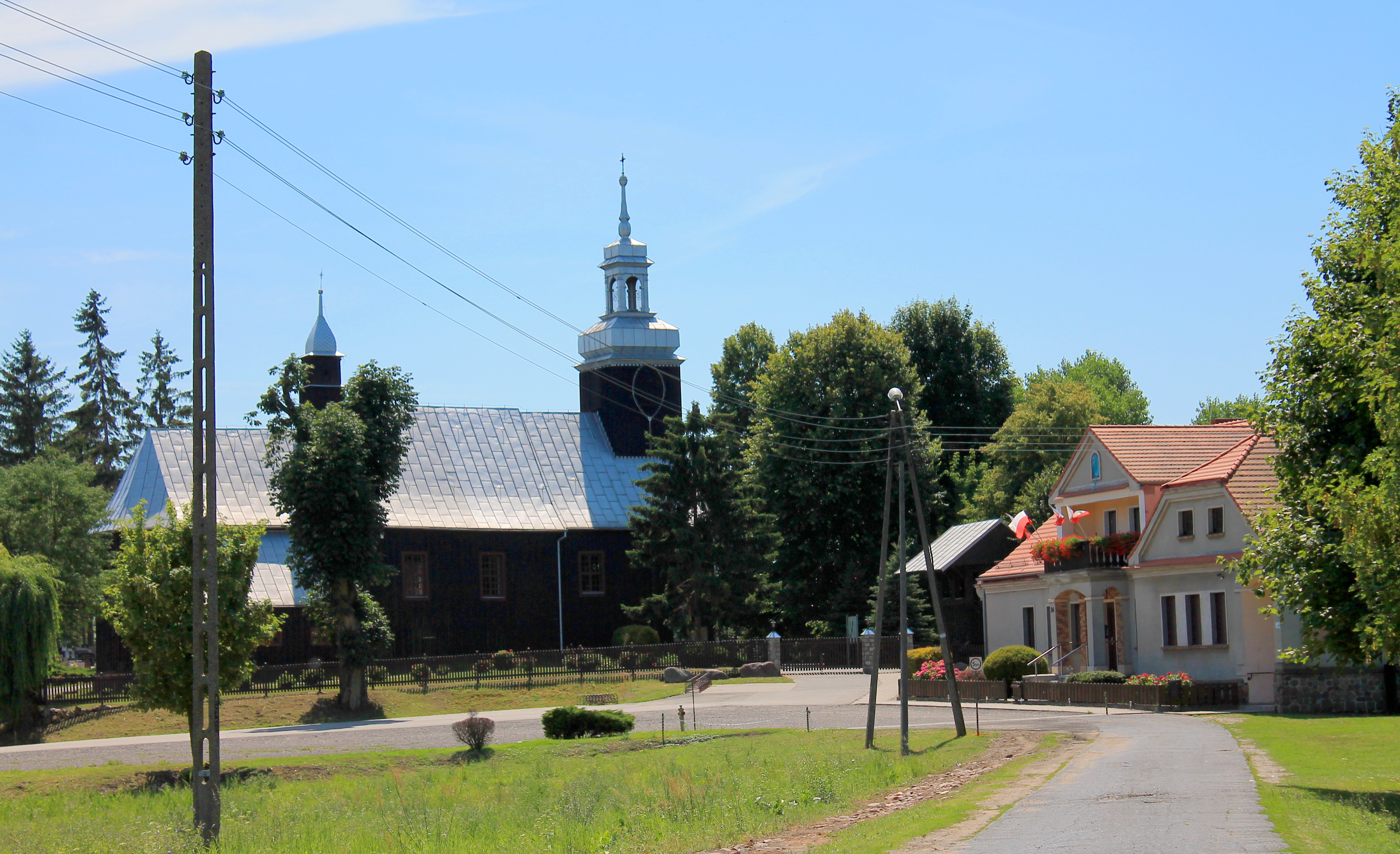
- Church of Saints Nicholas and Hedwig

- Location within Poland
- Coordinates: 52°35′N 17°29′E
- Country: Poland
- Voivodeship: Greater Poland
- County: Gniezno
- Gmina: Kłecko

Population
  - Total: 530

Dębnica [dɛmbˈnit͡sa] is a village in the administrative district of Gmina Kłecko, within Gniezno County, Greater Poland Voivodeship, in west-central Poland.
