= Pomarzany, Greater Poland Voivodeship =

Pomarzany
- Village
- Location within Poland
- Coordinates: 52°39′3″N 17°20′51″E
- Country: Poland
- Voivodeship: Greater Poland
- County: Gniezno
- Gmina: Kłecko
- Population: 110

Pomarzany [pɔmaˈʐanɨ] is a village in the administrative district of Gmina Kłecko, within Gniezno County, Greater Poland Voivodeship, in west-central Poland.
