= Wirydianna Fiszerowa =

Polish noblewoman (1761–1826)

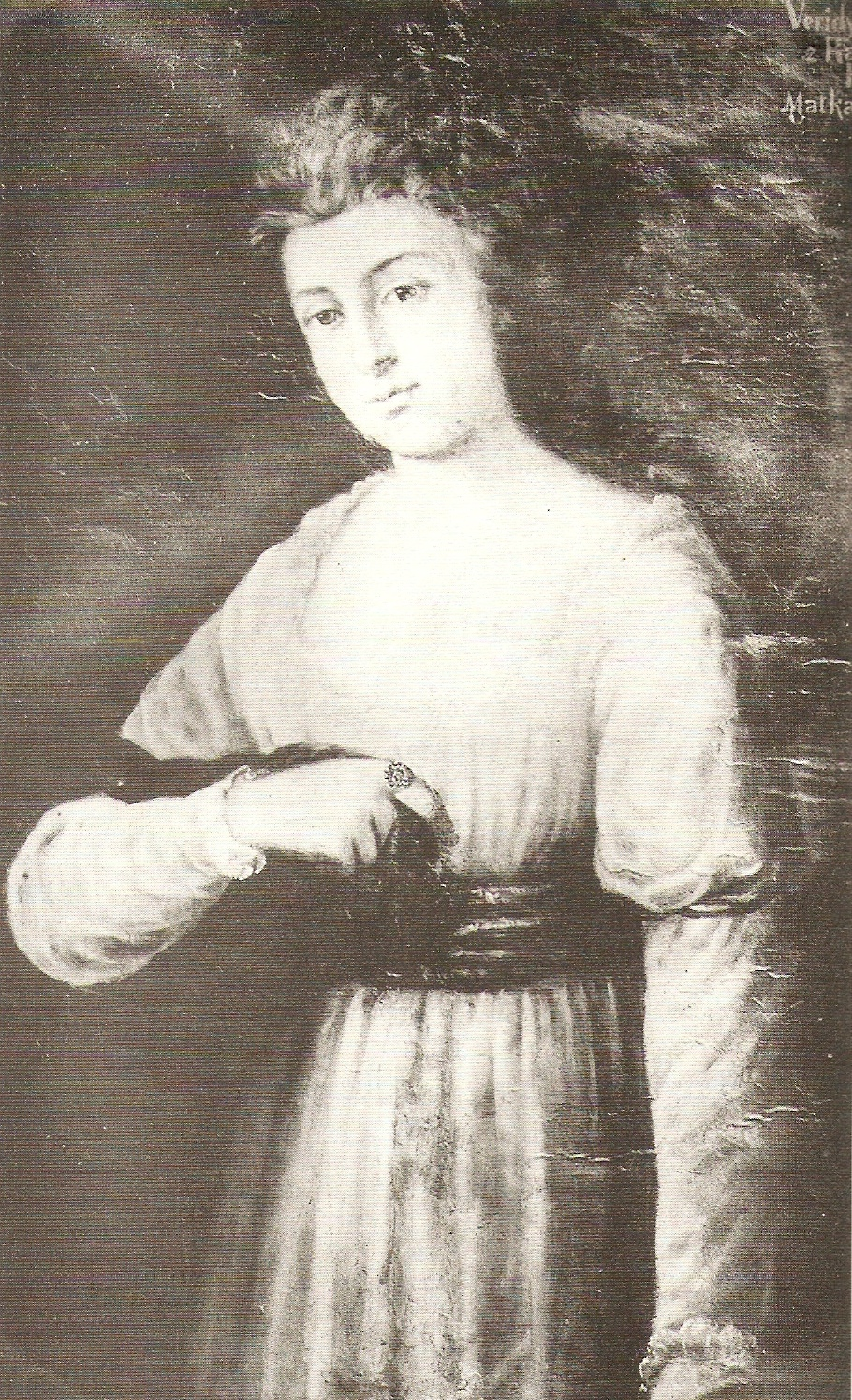
Wirydianna Fiszerowa

Wirydianna Fiszerowa (born Wirydianna Radolińska, using the Leszczyc coat of arms, later Wirydianna Kwilecka; 1761 in Wyszyny – 1826 in Działyń) was a Polish noblewoman best known for her memoirs, which mention her life in pre- and post-partition Poland and her relations with prominent people of the time, including King Frederick II of Prussia, Izabela Czartoryska, King Stanisław II Augustus, Józef Poniatowski, Jan Henryk Dąbrowski, and Tadeusz Kościuszko, whom she adored.

Events which she lived through include the Bar Confederation, which caused local upheaval, the work of the Great Sejm, Kościuszko Uprising, and the Napoleonic Wars.

== Biography ==
She was the eldest daughter of Katarzyna Raczyńska, popular in Wielkopolska and Józef Radoliński (d. 1781), with sisters: Katarzyna (b.1762) and Antonina (b.1770). She was named for her maternal grandmother Wirydianna Bnińska (1718–1797).

At the age of 25, she married Antoni Kwilecki, the son of Franciszek Antoni Kwilecki having chosen him over an older man, fearing that otherwise she would have become his nursemaid. They had two children: Anna (called Nina) (b.1789) and Józef (b. 1791). The marriage was not particularly happy, mostly because of his alcoholism which at times made him turn violent. Fiszerowa nearly miscarried her daughter Anna after he hit her), and the hostility of his parents. However, he did defend her against them, although she credited this less to the love he held for her, than to the family custom of fighting. When he fell for a fourteen-year-old peasant girl, he divorced Fiszerowa.

He was an envoy at the Four-Year Sejm, and she wrote speeches for her and her cousins.

In 1806 she married Stanisław Fiszer, a general who fought with Napoleon in his campaign against Russia, who loved her, though for Fiszerowa this was more about rewarding him for his patriotic service and to bring herself closer to Kościuszko, who cared for Fiszer.

Personally she was witty, called the "Voltaire in skirts", and spoke of her fellow citizens as "always brave and always beaten", believing that if they had banded together, they could have defended themselves from foreign aggression and prevented the partitions (this views is not shared by most modern historians. While living on a widow's pension in Warsaw after the formation of the Congress Kingdom, her mocking jokes about Grand Duke Constantine, the viceroy, reached his ears, and she received from him a threatening letter through his adjutant. She remained calm, saying only "Voilà une lettre qui passera à postérité" (This is a letter which will pass on to history), at which said adjutant left, having taken back the later which was to be the source of more amusement for her in the coming weeks.

She wrote in French; the memoirs were only published in a Polish translation in 1975 by Edward Raczyński, a kinsman who had been the Polish President in exile. In the meantime, it was widely unknown by historians, though mentioned in the pre-war Polish Biographical Dictionary with an entry by Adam Mieczysław Skałkowski, who knew only the year of her death.
