= Brzozogaj =

Village in Poland

- Village
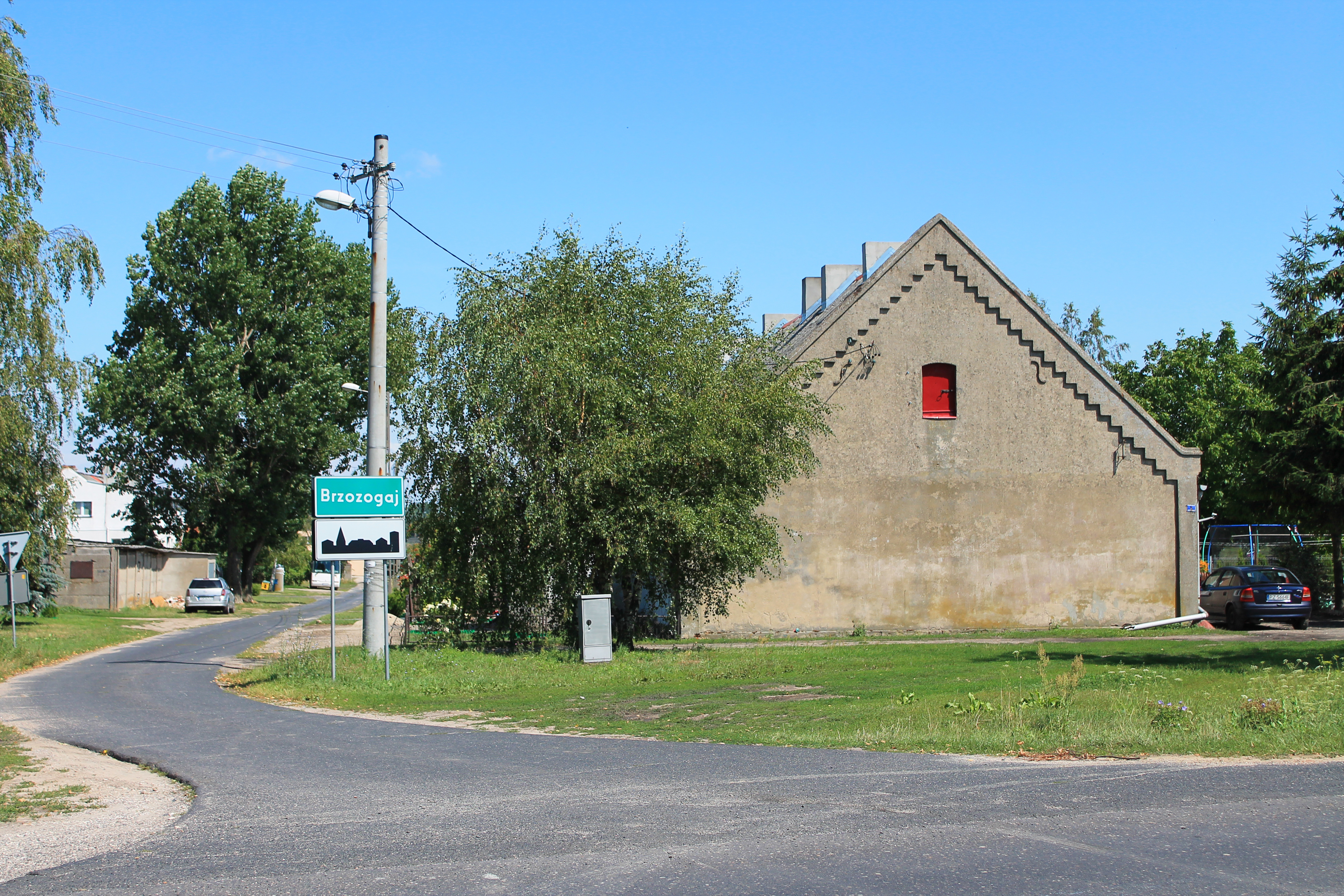

- Location within Poland
- Coordinates: 52°35′37″N 17°28′40″E
- Country: Poland
- Voivodeship: Greater Poland
- County: Gniezno
- Gmina: Kłecko
- Population: 100

Brzozogaj [bʐɔˈzɔɡai̯] is a village in the administrative district of Gmina Kłecko, within Gniezno County, Greater Poland Voivodeship, in west-central Poland.
