= Czechy, Greater Poland Voivodeship =

Czechy
- Village
- Location within Poland
- Coordinates: 52°36′N 17°25′E
- Country: Poland
- Voivodeship: Greater Poland
- County: Gniezno
- Gmina: Kłecko

Czechy [ˈt͡ʂɛxɨ] is a village in the administrative district of Gmina Kłecko, within Gniezno County, Greater Poland Voivodeship, in west-central Poland.
