= Bielawy, Gniezno County =

Bielawy
- Village
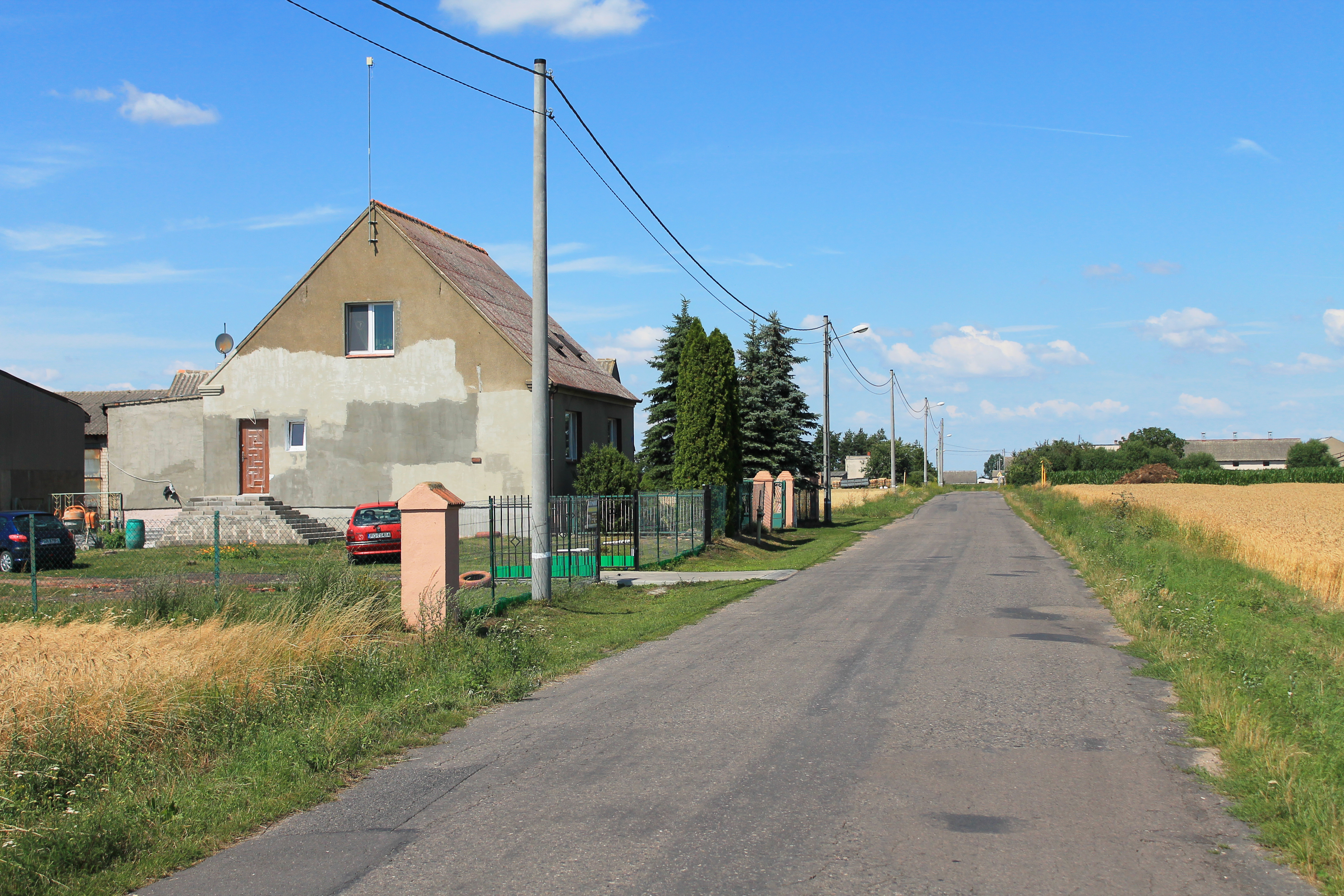

- Location within Poland
- Coordinates: 52°35′N 17°26′E
- Country: Poland
- Voivodeship: Greater Poland
- County: Gniezno
- Gmina: Kłecko

Bielawy ([bjɛˈlavɨ]; German: Bielawy, 1939–45 Bilau) is a village in the administrative district of Gmina Kłecko, within Gniezno County, Greater Poland Voivodeship, in west-central Poland.
