= Gmina Kłecko =

Gmina Kłecko Kłecko Commune
- Gmina
- Flag Coat of arms
- Interactive map of Gmina Kłecko
- Coordinates (Kłecko): 52°38′N 17°26′E
- Country: Poland
- Voivodeship: Greater Poland
- County: Gniezno
- Seat: Kłecko

Area
  - Total: 131.7 km^{2} (50.8 sq mi)

Population (2006)
  - Total: 7,569
  - Density: 57.47/km^{2} (148.9/sq mi)
  - Urban: 2,677
  - Rural: 4,892
- Website: http://www.klecko.pl/index1.html

Gmina Kłecko is an urban-rural gmina (administrative district) in Gniezno County, Greater Poland Voivodeship, in west-central Poland. Its seat is the town of Kłecko, which lies approximately 16 kilometres (10 mi) north-west of Gniezno and 44 km (27 mi) north-east of the regional capital Poznań.

The gmina covers an area of 131.7 square kilometres (50.8 sq mi), and as of 2006 its total population is 7,569 (out of which the population of Kłecko amounts to 2,677, and the population of the rural part of the gmina is 4,892).

== Massacre during Second World War ==
During the German Invasion of Poland in 1939, German soldiers mass murdered 23 Poles in the area. The victims were either shot, beaten to death with rifles or stabbed to death by bayonets by German soldiers. They were later buried in a mass grave.

== Villages ==
Apart from the town of Kłecko, Gmina Kłecko contains the villages and settlements of Bielawy, Biskupice, Bojanice, Brzozogaj, Charbowo, Czechy, Dębnica, Działyń, Dziećmiarki, Gorzuchowo, Kamieniec, Komorowo, Kopydłowo, Michalcza, Polska Wieś, Pomarzany, Pruchnowo, Sulin, Świniary, Ułanowo, Waliszewo, Wilkowyja and Zakrzewo.

== Neighbouring gminas ==
Gmina Kłecko is bordered by the gminas of Gniezno, Kiszkowo, Łubowo, Mieleszyn, Mieścisko and Skoki.
