= Stanisław Fiszer =

Polish military officer (1769–1812)

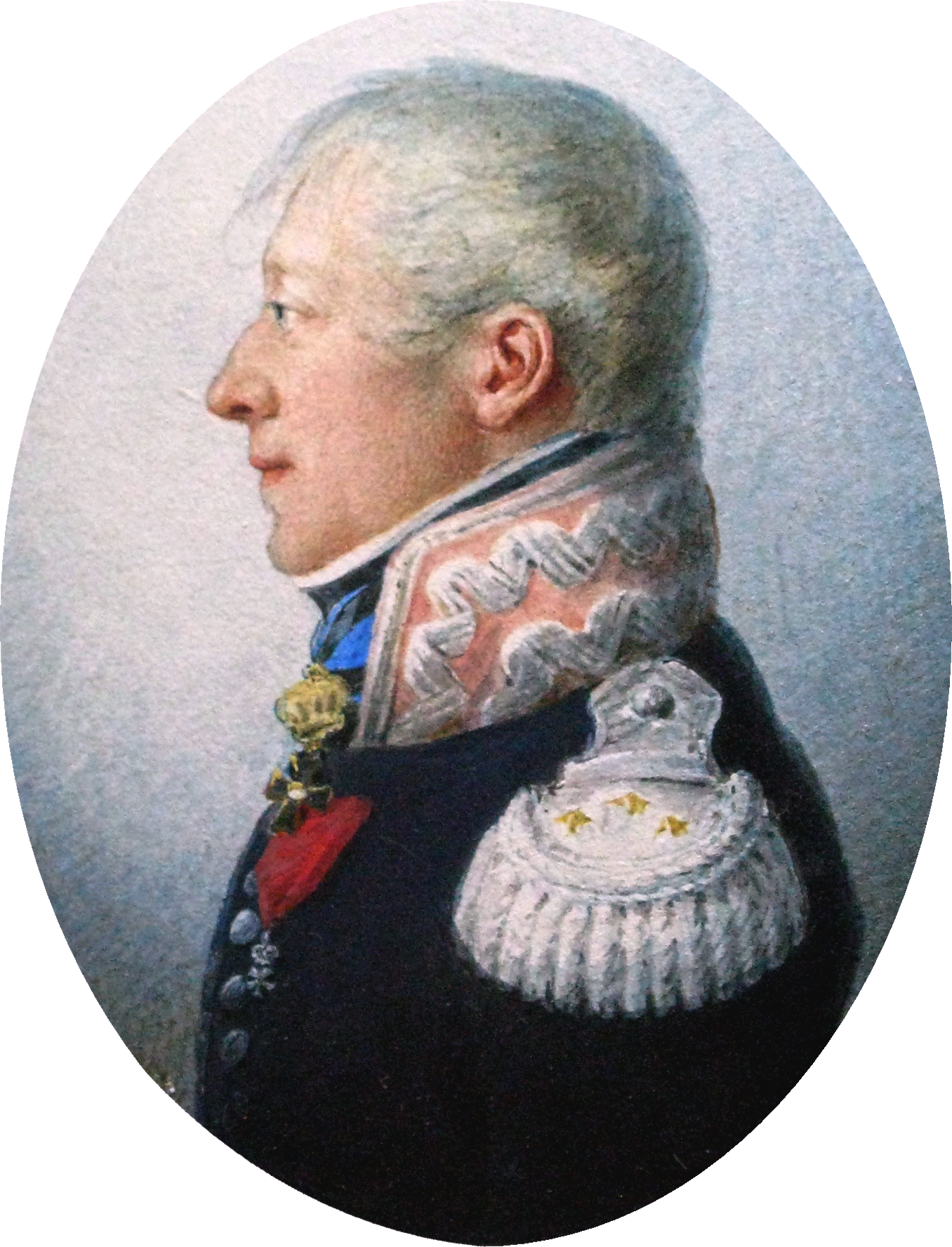
Portrait of Fiszer, housed in Polish Army Museum

Stanisław Fiszer (3 October 1769, Warsaw, Poland – 18 October 1812, Tarutino, Russian Empire) was Polish General and Chief of Staff of the Duchy of Warsaw.

He was married to Wirydianna Fiszerowa.

An inhabitant of Poland, his family was originally from Germany. Between 1783 and 1788, he attended the Corps of Cadets and joined Tadeusz Kosciuszko's brigade which was part of Poland's Division. Under Kosciuszko's command he fought in the Polish-Russian war of 1792. He took part in the battle of Polonno and the battle of Dubienka and moved up the ranks, eventually becoming a lieutenant. He was given the highest military decoration for heroism and courage in Poland—the Virtuti Militari. At the end of 1792, he arrived in Gdańsk, where according to Szymon Askenazy he was checking the state of the city's fortifications which were to be used as a part of project in which the Polish army that had been defeated by Russians was to move from Prussia to Gdańsk where they were to wait for help from France. In January 1793, after Prussia invaded Greater Poland, Fiszer, disguised as an emergency doctor, reached Frankfurt on the Oder where he surveyed the Prussian army moving towards Poland.
