= Franciszek Antoni Kwilecki =

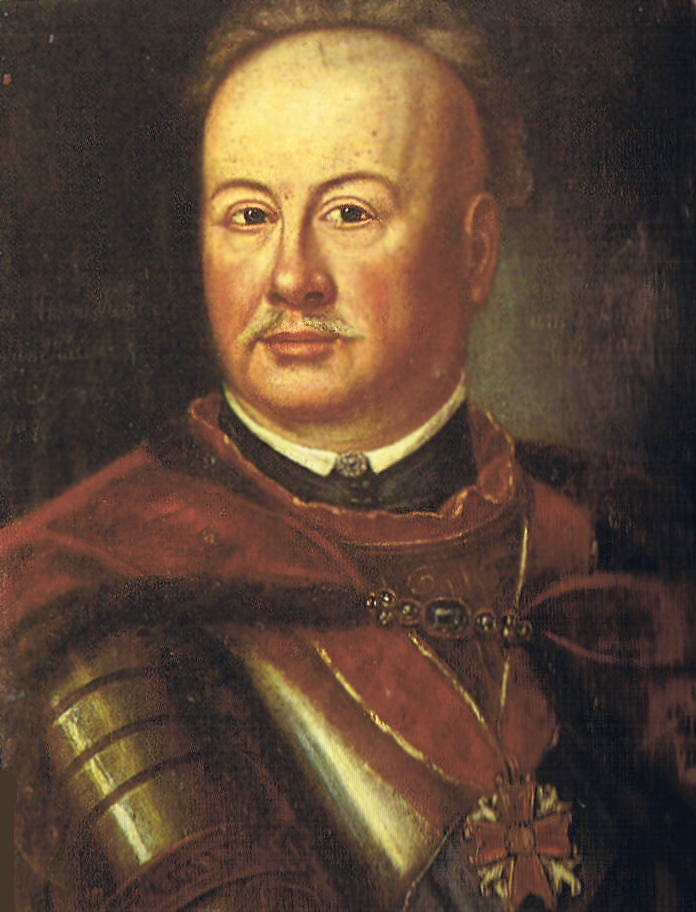
Franciszek Antoni Kwilecki

Franciszek Antoni Kwilecki (1725–1794) was a Polish nobleman, castelan of Kalisz, marshal of the Crown Tribunal (1766), member of the Bar Confederation (1768–1771), Polish envoy to Berlin (1771–1776), deputy to the Sejms of 1761, 1764 and the Great Sejm (1788–1792), which he opened on behalf of Stanisław Kostka Gadomski. Supporter of the Constitution of the 3rd May to which he was a signatory. Starost of Wschowa.

He had a daughter, Marianna, and a son, Antoni, who was also an envoy at the Great Sejm and the first husband of Wirydianna Fiszerowa, who wrote the latter's speeches.

Kwilecki received the Order of the White Eagle and the Order of Saint Stanislaus. In 1776, he also received the Order of St. Anna.
