= Biskupice, Gniezno County =

Biskupice
- Village
- Location within Poland
- Coordinates: 52°36′30″N 17°29′15″E
- Country: Poland
- Voivodeship: Greater Poland
- County: Gniezno
- Gmina: Kłecko

Biskupice [biskuˈpit͡sɛ] is a village in the administrative district of Gmina Kłecko, within Gniezno County, Greater Poland Voivodeship, in west-central Poland.
