= Wilkowyja, Gniezno County =

Wilkowyja
- Village
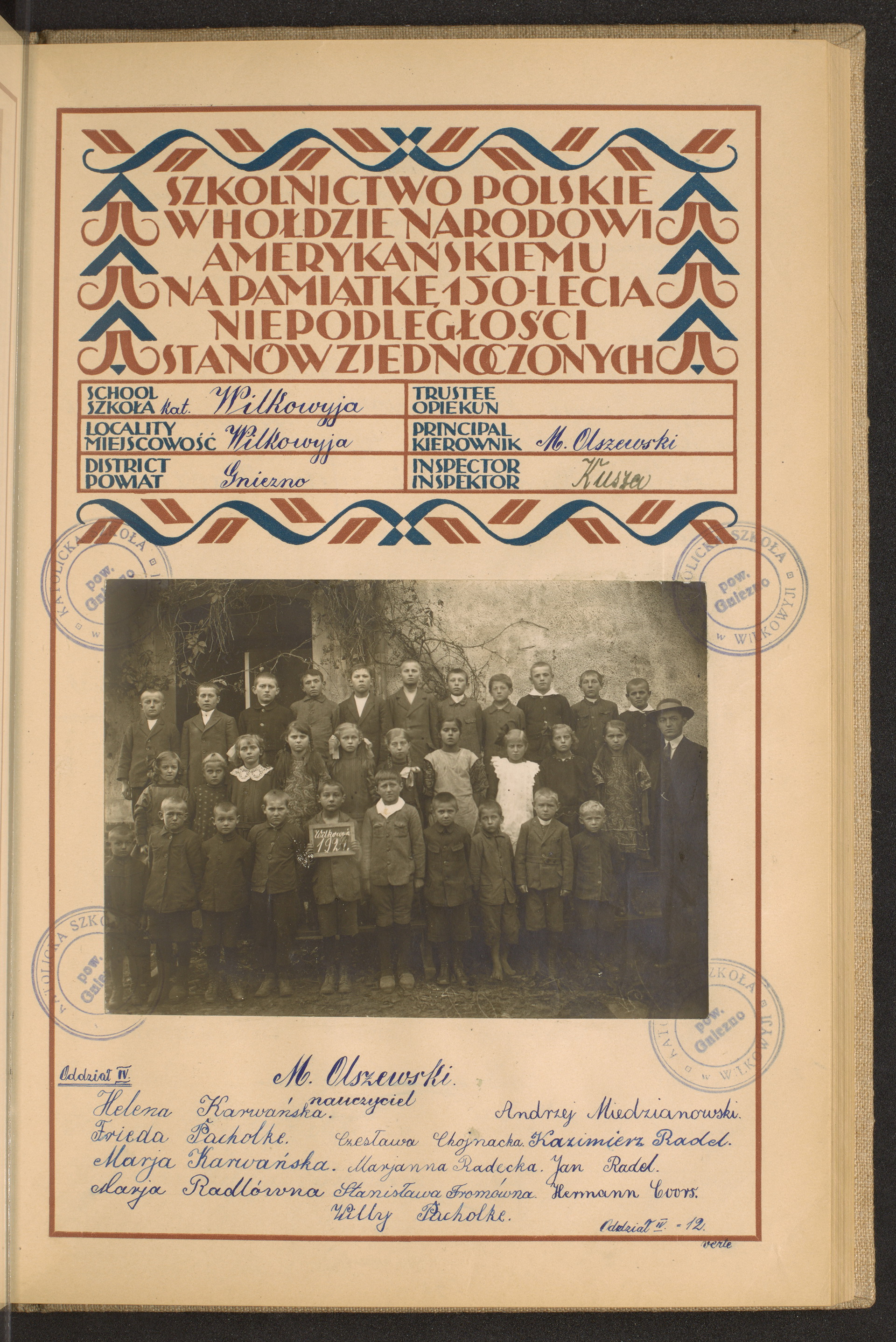
- Photo of students of the school in Wilkowyja from 1926

- Location within Poland
- Coordinates: 52°38′N 17°23′E
- Country: Poland
- Voivodeship: Greater Poland Voivodeship
- County: Gniezno
- Gmina: Kłecko
- Population: 387
- Postal Code: 62-270
- Area code: +48 61
- Car plates: PGN

Wilkowyja ([vilkɔˈvɨja]; German: Neu Paulsdorf) is a village in the administrative district of Gmina Kłecko, within Gniezno County, Greater Poland Voivodeship, in west-central Poland. In the years 1975-1998, the village administratively belonged to the Poznań Voivodeship. According to the 2021 National Census, Wilkowyja was inhabited by 387 inhabitants, of which 48.8% were women and 51.2% men. The main part of the village with single-family buildings is located by the district road 2154P connecting Wilkowyja with Polska Wieś and the provincial road No. 190. In the village, historic buildings from the turn of the 19th and 20th centuries, including a former manor house and school building, an old distillery and a historic Evangelical cemetery.

== History ==
Wilkowyja was a knightly village owned by the Junosza family. The first mention of the village dates back to 1580, when the village paid tithes to Kłecko. However, a settlement probably existed in this place much earlier, as Wilkowyja is mentioned as one of the settlements of the Kłecko stronghold. In 1793 the heir of Wilkowyja was Mikołaj Węsierski. On March 18, 1908, the village changed its name to Neu Paulsdorf as a result of the connection with the manor area of Polska Wieś (German: Gustsbezirke Paulsdorf).

== List of streets ==
- Gorzuchowska St.
- Bluszczowa St.
- Jałowcowa St.
- Jaśminowa St.
- Lawendowa St.
- Polna St.
- Rumiankowa St.
- Wrzosowa St.

== Greater Poland Insurgents ==
Two participants of the Greater Poland Uprising, decorated with the Greater Poland Uprising Cross, came from Wilkowyja.

1. Franciszek Baszczyński (b. 1.01.1898) - from 4.02.1919 to 18.02.1919, as a volunteer, he took part in the Jarocin Company (pol. Kompania Jarocińska) in the fights near Miejska Górka, Sarnów, Rawicz, from February 19, 1919 to July 1921, he served in the communication company of the 11th Greater Poland Rifle Regiment (pol. 11 Pułk Strzelców Wielkopolskich) from where he was released to the reserve
2. Andrzej Urbaniak (b. 26.10.1892) – from 27.12.1918 to 18.02.1919 he performed patrol and guard duty in Poznań in the Poznań-Jeżyce district
