= Pruchnowo, Greater Poland Voivodeship =

Pruchnowo
- Village
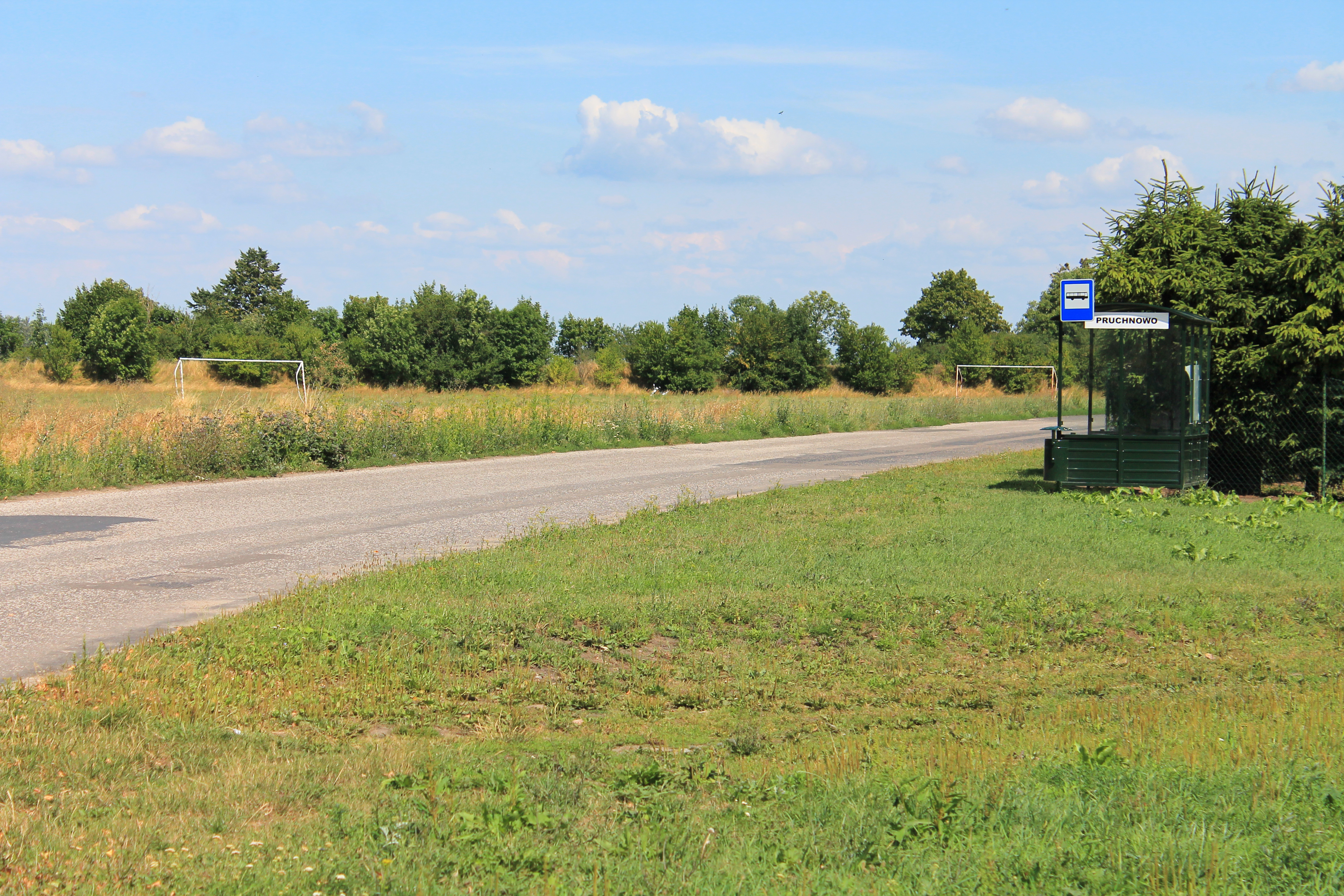
- Bus stop at the intersection in the village of Pruchnowo, Greater Poland Voivodeship

- Location within Poland
- Coordinates: 52°36′06″N 17°27′11″E
- Country: Poland
- Voivodeship: Greater Poland
- County: Gniezno
- Gmina: Kłecko

Pruchnowo [pruxˈnɔvɔ] is a village in the administrative district of Gmina Kłecko, within Gniezno County, Greater Poland Voivodeship, in west-central Poland.
