= Idol Poland season 4 =

Season of television series

Idol Poland
- Season 4
- Hosted by: Maciej Rock
- Judges: Kuba Wojewódzki; Robert Leszczyński; Elżbieta Zapendowska; Jacek Cygan
- Winner: Maciej Silski
- Runner-up: Sławomir Uniatowski
- No. of episodes: 23

Release
- Original network: Polsat
- Original release: February 16 – June 18, 2005

Season chronology
- ← Previous; Season 3 Next → Season 5

Idol Poland (season 4) was the fourth season of Idol Poland. Maciej Silski won over Sławomir Uniatowski and Bartosz Szymoniak.

== Finals ==
=== Finalists ===
(ages stated at time of contest)

| Contestant | Age | Hometown | Voted Off | Liveshow Theme |
|---|---|---|---|---|
| Maciej Silski | 28 | Kwidzyn | Winner | Grand Finale |
| Sławomir Uniatowski | 20 | Toruń | June 18, 2005 | Grand Finale |
| Bartosz Szymoniak | 20 | Tursko | June 18, 2005 | Grand Finale |
| Dominika Kasprzycka | 17 | Skarżysko-Kamienna | June 4, 2005 | Jury's Choice |
| Piotr Lato | 25 | Konstancin-Jeziorna | May 28, 2005 | Latino |
| Dominika Pawłowska | 22 | Stargard | May 21, 2005 | Idol in Grand Style |
| Nina Cieślińska | 17 | Słupsk | May 14, 2005 | New Sounds |
| Magdalena Diaków | 16 | Pyskowice | May 7, 2005 | Kings & Queens of Music |
| Sławomir Peca | 20 | Katowice | April 30, 2005 | 70s Polish Hits |
| Karolina Szarubka | 21 | Stargard | April 23, 2005 | My Idol |

=== Live Show Details ===
==== Heat 1 (26 March 2005) ====
| Artist | Song (original artists) | Result |
|---|---|---|
| Dominika Kasprzycka | "Angel" (Sarah McLachlan) | Advanced |
| Jagoda Kurpios | "Nie budźcie mnie" () | Eliminated |
| Justyna Roszak | "Małe tęsknoty" () | Eliminated |
| Michał Zerka | "Knockin' on Heaven's Door" (Bob Dylan) | Eliminated |
| Milena Rózewska | "Whole Lotta Love" (Led Zeppelin) | Eliminated |
| Piotr Lato | "Hemorrhage (In My Hands)" (Fuel) | Advanced |
| Sylwia Grzeszczak | "Lovin U" (Alicia Keys) | Eliminated |

==== Heat 2 (30 March 2005) ====
| Artist | Song (original artists) | Result |
|---|---|---|
| Arkadiusz Niezgoda | "Always" (Bon Jovi) | Eliminated |
| Dominika Pawłowska | "I Have Nothing" (Whitney Houston) | Advanced |
| Małgorzata Rychlewska | "I've Got to Sing My Song" (Oleta Adams) | Eliminated |
| Marta Woldańska | "This Will Be (An Everlasting Love)" (Natalie Cole) | Eliminated |
| Michał Jabłoński | "Niepokonani" (Perfect) | Eliminated |
| Ola Tchórzewska | "Lately" (Skunk Anansie) | Eliminated |
| Sławomir Peca | "Always on My Mind" (Willie Nelson) | Advanced |

==== Heat 3 (9 April 2005) ====
| Artist | Song (original artists) | Result |
|---|---|---|
| Aleksandra Strunin | "Była lubow" (Valeria) | Eliminated |
| Jakub Arendt | "Incomplete" (Sisqó) | Eliminated |
| Karolina Szarubka | "Holding Out for a Hero" (Bonnie Tyler) | Advanced |
| Magda Ziółkowska | "Como quieres que te quiera" (Rosario Flores) | Eliminated |
| Marika Tomczyk | "Fighter" (Christina Aguilera) | Eliminated |
| Nina Cieślińska | "What's Up" (4 Non Blondes) | Advanced |
| Tomasz Krupa | "God Give Me Strength" (Elvis Costello) | Eliminated |

==== Heat 4 (13 April 2005) ====
| Artist | Song (original artists) | Result |
|---|---|---|
| Aranka Straus | "Wielka zima" () | Eliminated |
| Bartosz Szymoniak | "Czarne słońca" (Kult) | Advanced |
| Janusz Nowicki | "Hold the Line" (Toto) | Eliminated |
| Joanna Dec | "I Will Survive" (Gloria Gaynor) | Eliminated |
| Joanna Stach | "I Will Love Again" (Lara Fabian) | Eliminated |
| Kamil Franczak | "Venus" (Shocking Blue) | Eliminated |
| Maciek Silski | "Hunger Strike" (Temple of the Dog) | Advanced |

==== Heat 5 (16 April 2005) ====
| Artist | Song (original artists) | Result |
|---|---|---|
| Artur Pluskota | "Nie ma nas" () | Eliminated |
| Daniel Piecyk | "Black Magic Woman" (Fleetwood Mac) | Eliminated |
| Magdalena Diaków | "Fire" (Mousse T. & Emma Lanford) | Advanced |
| Marta Ćwik | "Konduktorski blues" () | Eliminated |
| Monika Wiśniowska | "Just Once" (James Ingram) | Eliminated |
| Rafał Stefanowski | "Say It Isn't So" () | Eliminated |
| Sławomir Uniatowski | "Roxanne" (The Police) | Advanced |

==== Live Show 1 (23 April 2005) ====
Theme: My Idol

| Artist | Song (original artists) | Result |
|---|---|---|
| Bartosz Szymoniak | "Black or White" (Michael Jackson) | Safe |
| Dominika Kasprzycka | "You Gotta Be" (Des'ree) | Safe |
| Dominika Pawłowska | "I Try" (Macy Gray) | Safe |
| Karolina Szarubka | "Testosteron" (Kayah) | Eliminated |
| Maciej Silski | "Purple Rain" (Prince) | Safe |
| Magdalena Diaków | "Don't Speak" (No Doubt) | Bottom two |
| Nina Cieślińska | "Like a Virgin" (Madonna) | Safe |
| Piotr Lato | "Ain't No Sunshine" (Bill Withers) | Safe |
| Sławomir Peca | "Every Breath You Take" (The Police) | Safe |
| Sławomir Uniatowski | "Sledgehammer" (Peter Gabriel) | Safe |

==== Live Show 2 (30 April 2005) ====
Theme: 70s Polish Hits

| Artist | Song (original artists) | Result |
|---|---|---|
| Bartosz Szymoniak | "Do zakochania jeden krok" (Andrzej Dąbrowski) | Safe |
| Dominika Kasprzycka | "Wyszłam za mąż, zaraz wracam" (Ewa Bem) | Safe |
| Dominika Pawłowska | "Radość najpiękniejszych lat" (Anna Jantar) | Safe |
| Maciej Silski | "Sen o Warszawie" (Czesław Niemen) | Safe |
| Magdalena Diaków | "Podaruj mi trochę słońca" (Bemibek) | Safe |
| Nina Cieślińska | "Sing-Sing" (Maryla Rodowicz) | Safe |
| Piotr Lato | "Iść w stronę słońca" (2 Plus 1) | Bottom two |
| Sławomir Peca | "Pamiętam ciebie z tamtych lat" (Krzysztof Krawczyk) | Eliminated |
| Sławomir Uniatowski | "Medytacje wiejskiego listonosza" (Skaldowie) | Safe |

==== Live Show 3 (7 May 2005) ====
Theme: Kings & Queens

| Artist | Song (original artists) | Result |
|---|---|---|
| Bartosz Szymoniak | "Could You Be Loved" (Bob Marley) | Safe |
| Dominika Kasprzycka | "What's Love Got to Do with It" (Tina Turner) | Bottom two |
| Dominika Pawłowska | "Respect" (Aretha Franklin) | Safe |
| Maciej Silski | "Superstition" (Stevie Wonder) | Safe |
| Magdalena Diaków | "We Will Rock You" (Queen) | Eliminated |
| Nina Cieślińska | "(I Can't Get No) Satisfaction" (The Rolling Stones) | Safe |
| Piotr Lato | "Come Together" (The Beatles) | Safe |
| Sławomir Uniatowski | "Man in the Mirror" (Michael Jackson) | Safe |

==== Live Show 4 (14 May 2005) ====
Theme: New Sounds

| Artist | Song (original artists) | Result |
|---|---|---|
| Bartosz Szymoniak | "I Don't Wanna Know" (Mario Winans) | Safe |
| Dominika Kasprzycka | "Say My Name" (Destiny's Child) | Safe |
| Dominika Pawłowska | "Spinning Around" (Kylie Minogue) | Safe |
| Maciej Silski | "Rock Your Body" (Justin Timberlake) | Safe |
| Nina Cieślińska | "Crazy in Love" (Beyoncé Knowles) | Eliminated |
| Piotr Lato | "Rise & Fall" (Craig David & Sting) | Bottom two |
| Sławomir Uniatowski | "If I Ain't Got You" (Alicia Keys) | Safe |

==== Live Show 5 (21 May 2005) ====
Theme: Idol in Grand Style

| Artist | Song (original artists) | Result |
|---|---|---|
| Bartosz Szymoniak | "Bądź moim natchnieniem" (Andrzej Zaucha) | Safe |
| Dominika Kasprzycka | "Dream a Little Dream of Me" (Mama Cass) | Safe |
| Dominika Pawłowska | "When I Fall in Love" (Nat King Cole) | Eliminated |
| Maciej Silski | "Ta ostatnia niedziela" (Mieczysław Fogg) | Bottom two |
| Piotr Lato | "Woman in Love" (Barbra Streisand) | Safe |
| Sławomir Uniatowski | "New York, New York" (Frank Sinatra) | Safe |

==== Live Show 6 (28 May 2005) ====
Theme: Latino

| Artist | First song (original artists) | Second song | Result |
|---|---|---|---|
| Bartosz Szymoniak | "Bailamos" (Enrique Iglesias) | "Gdy nie ma dzieci" (Kult) | Bottom two |
| Dominika Kasprzycka | "No, co ty na to" (Mieczysław Szcześniak) | "The Game of Love" (Santana & Michelle Branch) | Safe |
| Maciej Silski | "Corazón Espinado" (Santana) | "La Bamba" (Ritchie Valens) | Safe |
| Piotr Lato | "Cariño" (Jennifer Lopez) | "La Isla Bonita" (Madonna) | Eliminated |
| Sławomir Uniatowski | "She Bangs" (Ricky Martin) | "The Look of Love" (Dusty Springfield) | Safe |

==== Live Show 7: Semi-final (4 June 2005) ====
Theme: Jury's Choice

| Artist | First song (original artists) | Second song | Result |
|---|---|---|---|
| Bartosz Szymoniak | "I tak warto żyć" (Raz, Dwa, Trzy) | "Spadam" (Coma) | Safe |
| Dominika Kasprzycka | "Czas nas uczy pogody" (Grażyna Łobaszewska) | "Łatwopalni" (Maryla Rodowicz) | Eliminated |
| Maciej Silski | "Autobusy i tramwaje" (T.Love) | "Break On Through (To the Other Side)" (The Doors) | Safe |
| Sławomir Uniatowski | "Sutra" (Sistars) | "Vertigo" (U2) | Safe |

==== Live final (18 June 2005) ====
| Artist | First song | Second song | Result |
|---|---|---|---|
| Bartosz Szymoniak | "Pastime Paradise" | "Ten o tobie film" | Eliminated |
| Maciej Silski | "American Woman" | "If You Don't Know Me by Now" | Winner |
| Sławomir Uniatowski | "I Believe I Can Fly" | "If You Love Somebody Set Them Free" | Runner-up |
