= Kamieniec, Gmina Kłecko =

Kamieniec
- Village
- Location within Poland
- Coordinates: 52°37′58″N 17°20′25″E
- Country: Poland
- Voivodeship: Greater Poland
- County: Gniezno
- Gmina: Kłecko

Kamieniec [kaˈmjɛɲɛt͡s] is a village in the administrative district of Gmina Kłecko, within Gniezno County, Greater Poland Voivodeship, in west-central Poland.
