= Zakrzewo, Gniezno County =

Zakrzewo
- Village
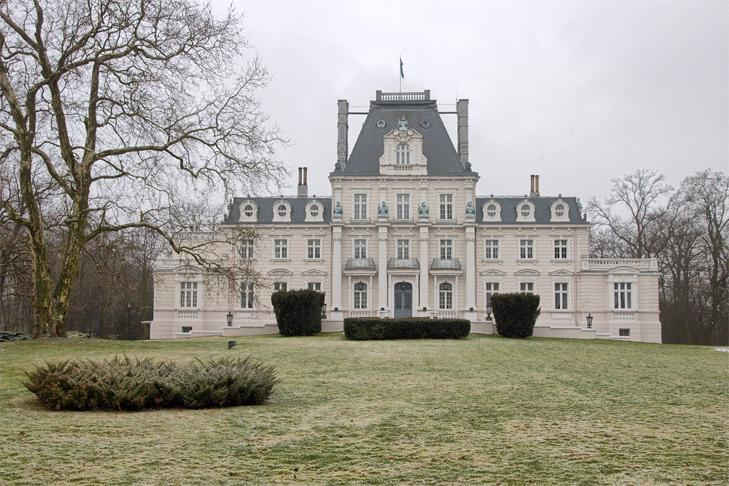
- Palace in Zakrzewo

- Location within Poland
- Coordinates: 52°36′N 17°23′E
- Country: Poland
- Voivodeship: Greater Poland
- County: Gniezno
- Gmina: Kłecko

Zakrzewo [zaˈkʂɛvɔ] is a village in the administrative district of Gmina Kłecko, within Gniezno County, Greater Poland Voivodeship, in west-central Poland.
