= Dziećmiarki =

- Village
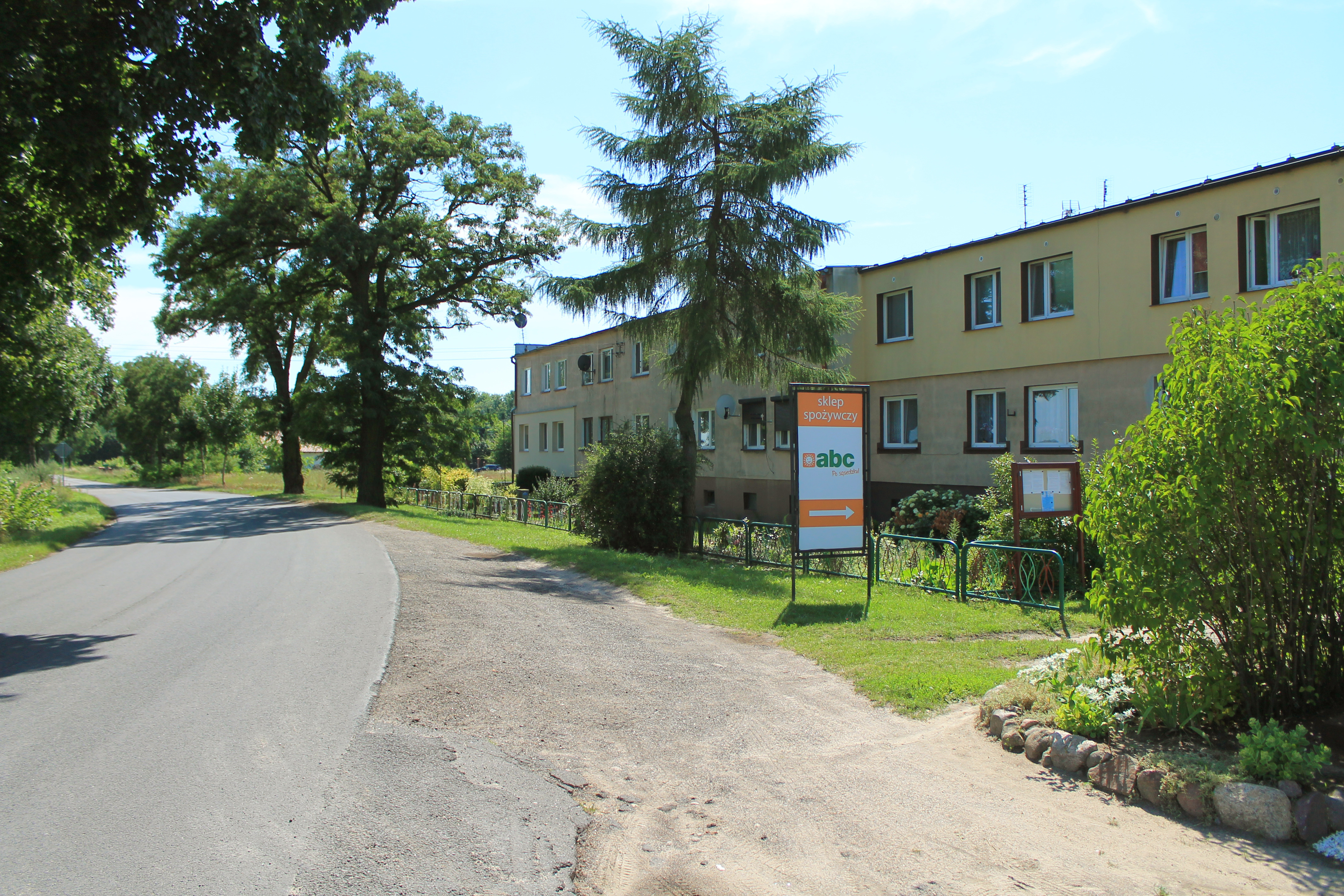
- Buildings by the road in Dziećmiarki

- Location within Poland
- Coordinates: 52°34′46″N 17°24′36″E
- Country: Poland
- Voivodeship: Greater Poland
- County: Gniezno
- Gmina: Kłecko

Dziećmiarki [d͡ʑɛt͡ɕˈmjarki] is a village in the administrative district of Gmina Kłecko, within Gniezno County, Greater Poland Voivodeship, in west-central Poland.
