= Gorzuchowo, Greater Poland Voivodeship =

Gorzuchowo
- Village
- Location within Poland
- Coordinates: 52°36′42″N 17°24′24″E
- Country: Poland
- Voivodeship: Greater Poland
- County: Gniezno
- Gmina: Kłecko

Gorzuchowo [ɡɔʐuˈxɔvɔ] is a village in the administrative district of Gmina Kłecko, within Gniezno County, Greater Poland Voivodeship, in west-central Poland.
