= Kopydłowo, Gniezno County =

Kopydłowo
- Village
- Location within Poland
- Coordinates: 52°35′7″N 17°31′5″E
- Country: Poland
- Voivodeship: Greater Poland
- County: Gniezno
- Gmina: Kłecko

Kopydłowo [kɔpɨˈdwɔvɔ] is a village in the administrative district of Gmina Kłecko, within Gniezno County, Greater Poland Voivodeship, in west-central Poland.
