= Waliszewo, Greater Poland Voivodeship =

Waliszewo
- Village
- Location within Poland
- Coordinates: 52°34′N 17°23′E
- Country: Poland
- Voivodeship: Greater Poland
- County: Gniezno
- Gmina: Kłecko

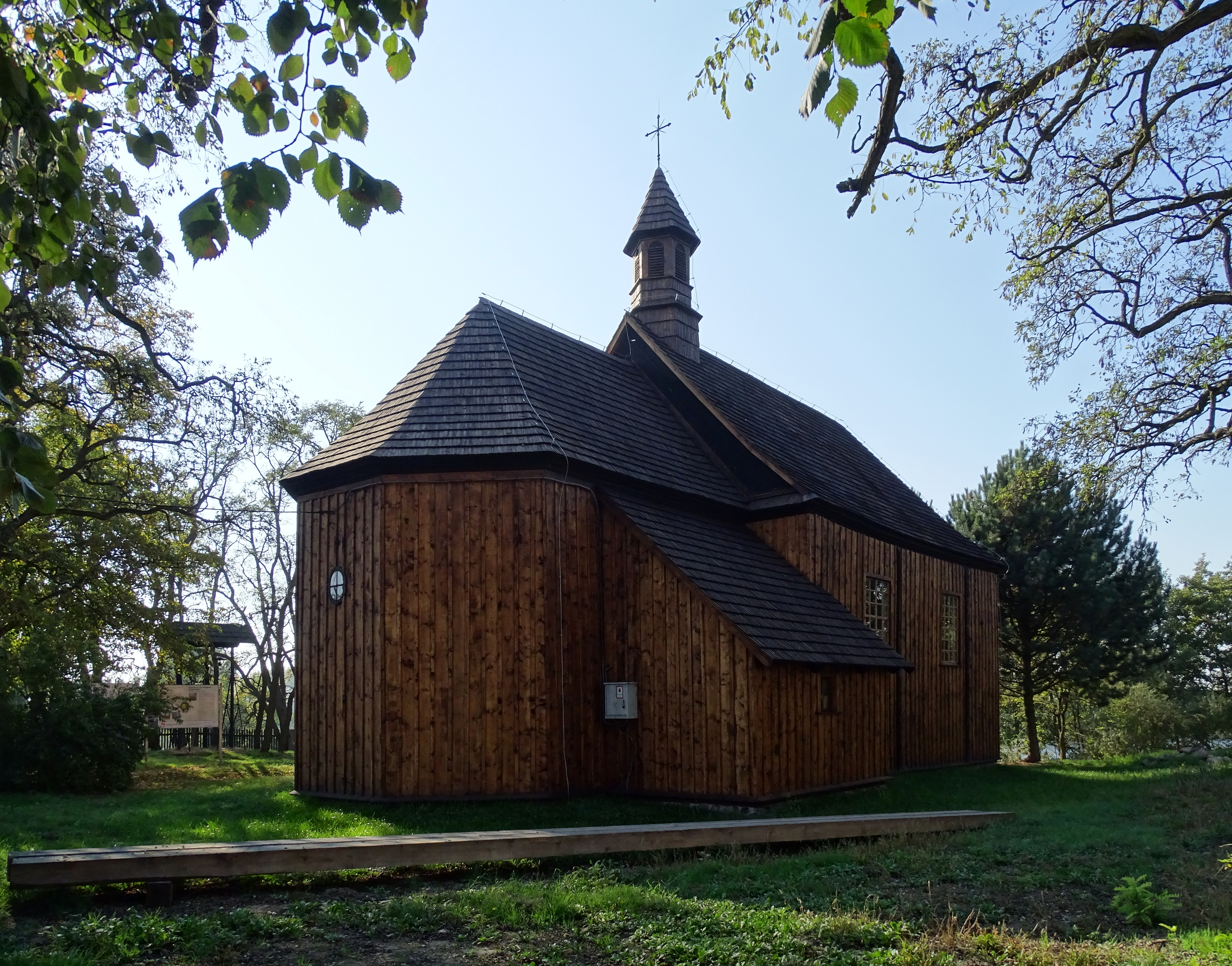
Church of St Catherine from 1759.

Waliszewo [valiˈʂɛvɔ] is a village in the administrative district of Gmina Kłecko, within Gniezno County, Greater Poland Voivodeship, in west-central Poland.
