= Kłecko =

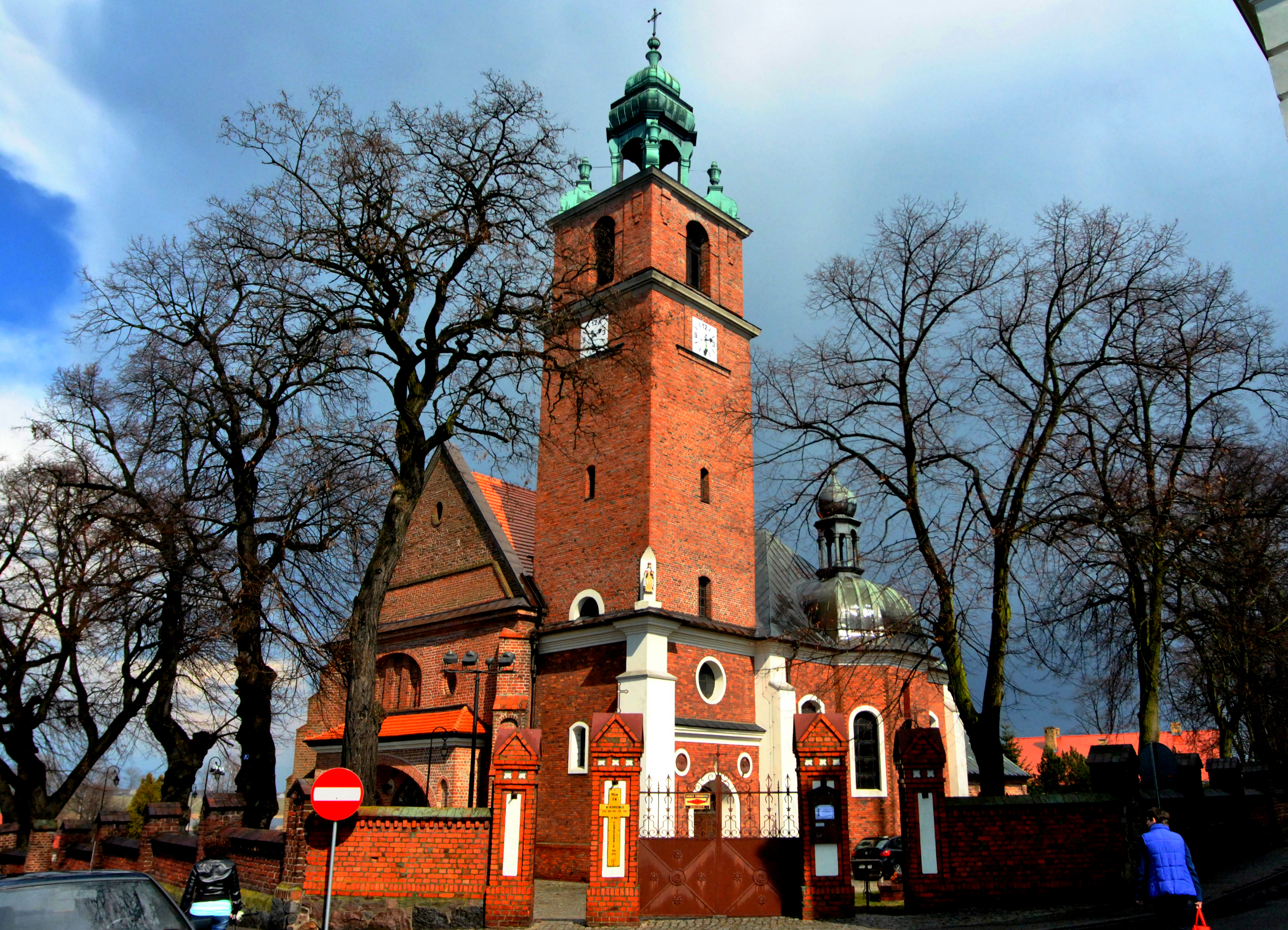
- Saint George church in Kłecko

- Flag Coat of arms

- Location within Poland
- Coordinates: 52°38′N 17°26′E
- Country: Poland
- Voivodeship: Greater Poland
- County: Gniezno
- Gmina: Kłecko
- Established: 9th century

Area
  - Total: 9.61 km^{2} (3.71 sq mi)

Population (31.XII.2024)
  - Total: 2,496
  - Density: 260/km^{2} (673/sq mi)
- Time zone: UTC+1 (CET)
  - Summer (DST): UTC+2 (CEST)
- Postal code: 62-270
- Vehicle registration: PGN
- Climate: Dfb
- Website: http://www.klecko.pl

Kłecko ([ˈkwɛt͡skɔ]) is a town in Gniezno County, Greater Poland Voivodeship, in west-central Poland, with 2,496 inhabitants (2024).

== History ==
A Lechitic stronghold was founded in the 9th century, located in the Greater Poland region, which in the 10th century would become the cradle of the emerging Polish state. Kłecko was granted town rights probably by Duke Bolesław the Pious in 1265. It was a royal town of Poland, administratively located in the Gniezno County in the Kalisz Voivodeship in the Greater Poland Province. In 1331, during the Polish–Teutonic War, the Teutonic Knights plundered and destroyed the town, and murdered its defenders. A battle between the Swedish Army and Polish forces stood here on 7 May 1656 during the Deluge (Swedish invasion of Poland). The battle was an important victory for Sweden. A painting picturing the battle can be seen in the museum at the current Home of the Swedish royal family Drottningholm Palace near Stockholm, Sweden.

=== Second World War ===
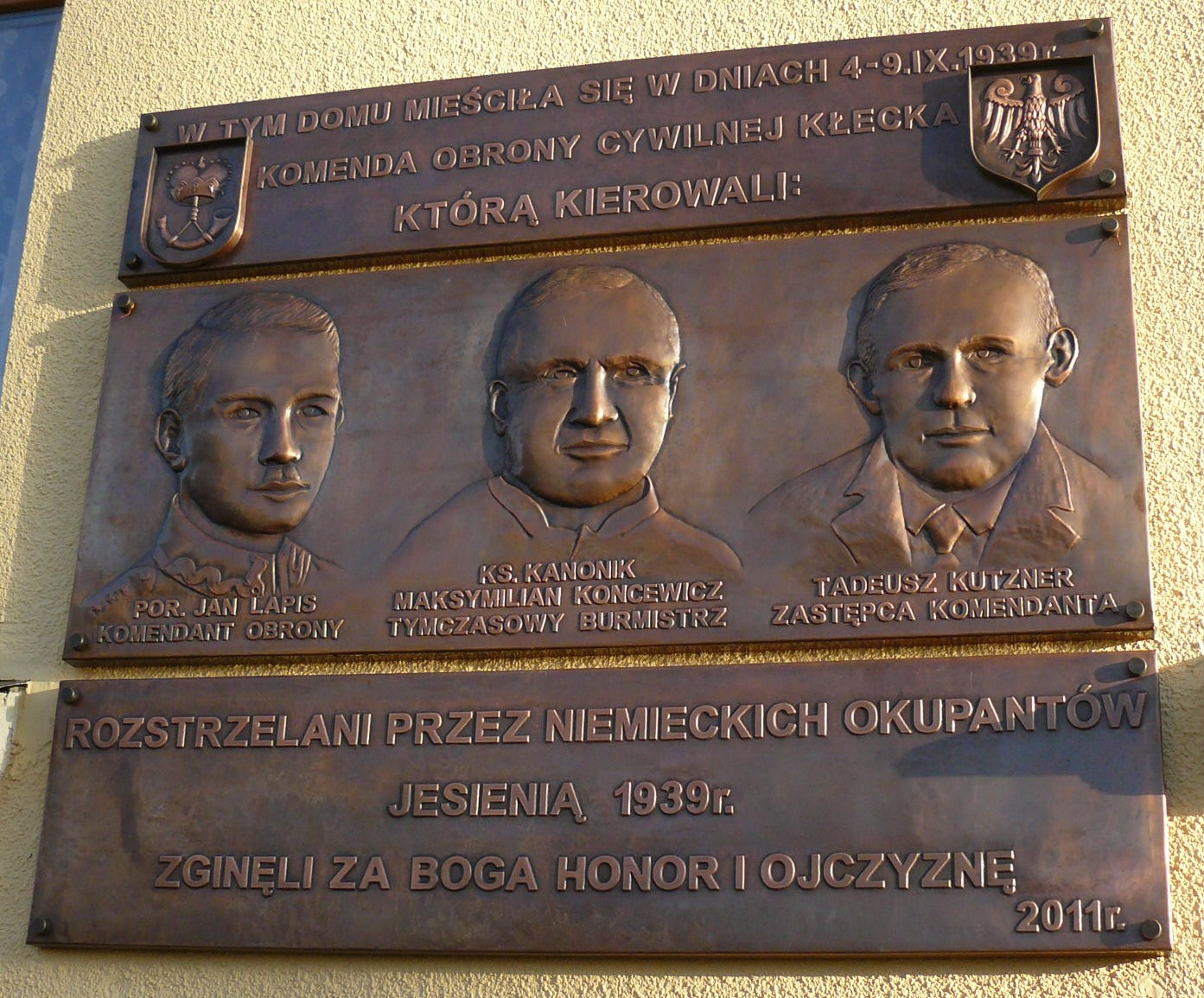
Memorial plaque to the commanders of the 1939 Polish defense of Kłecko

During the German Invasion of Poland, which started World War II, the Wehrmacht reached Kłecko on 8 September 1939 and a battle was fought in which the town was fiercely defended by Poles. The first killed defender was 17-year-old boy scout Sylwester Śliwiński. After capturing the town, Wehrmacht soldiers and SS mass murdered 300 Polish civilians from the town on 9 and 10 September. The victims were chosen at random, from all males gathered in the town square and then randomly selected for execution as alleged attackers against the German Army. 41% of murdered were teenagers (11 years to 16 years old), but people as old as 78 were also killed. The victims were later buried in mass graves. The commanders of the Polish defense were captured by the Germans in October 1939, and then murdered in November 1939. Families of the victims, 139 people, were expelled from the town in 1939. In 1940, the town was renamed by the occupiers to Klötzen. The Polish resistance movement was present in Kłecko. Edward Paulus, founder of the local unit of the Union of Armed Struggle, was arrested by the Gestapo in 1942, and eventually sentenced to death and executed the following year. The German occupation ended in 1945.

After World War II, the governor of Greater Poland called Kłecko "Wielkopolskie Westerplatte", saying that Kłecko was the Greater Poland equivalent of Westerplatte.

== Demographics ==
Historical population

Year	Pop.	±%
1871	1,843	—
1880	1,951	+5.9%
1890	1,751	−10.3%
1900	1,724	−1.5%
1910	1,838	+6.6%
1921	1,685	−8.3%

Year	Pop.	±%
1931	1,698	+0.8%
1939	1,800	+6.0%
1950	1,476	−18.0%
1960	1,771	+20.0%
2010	2,632	+48.6%

== Sports ==
The local football club is GKS Lechita Kłecko. It competes in the lower leagues.
