= Sulin =

- Village
- Location within Poland
- Coordinates: 52°34′19″N 17°26′18″E
- Country: Poland
- Voivodeship: Greater Poland
- County: Gniezno
- Gmina: Kłecko

Sulin [ˈsulin] is a village in the administrative district of Gmina Kłecko, within Gniezno County, Greater Poland Voivodeship, in west-central Poland.
