= Świniary, Greater Poland Voivodeship =

Świniary
- Village
- Location within Poland
- Coordinates: 52°41′N 17°26′E
- Country: Poland
- Voivodeship: Greater Poland
- County: Gniezno
- Gmina: Kłecko

Świniary [ɕfiˈɲarɨ] (German: Bismarcksfelde) is a village in the administrative district of Gmina Kłecko, within Gniezno County, Greater Poland Voivodeship, in west-central Poland.
