= Bojanice, Gniezno County =

Bojanice
- Village
- Location within Poland
- Coordinates: 52°36′N 17°31′E
- Country: Poland
- Voivodeship: Greater Poland
- County: Gniezno
- Gmina: Kłecko
- Time zone: UTC+1 (CET)
  - Summer (DST): UTC+2 (CEST)
- Vehicle registration: PGN

Bojanice [bɔjaˈnit͡sɛ] is a village in the administrative district of Gmina Kłecko, within Gniezno County, Greater Poland Voivodeship, in west-central Poland.

== History ==
As part of the region of Greater Poland, i.e. the cradle of the Polish state, the area formed part of Poland since its establishment in the 10th century. Bojanice was a private village of Polish nobility, administratively located in the Gniezno County in the Kalisz Voivodeship in the Greater Poland Province of the Kingdom of Poland. It was annexed by Prussia in the Second Partition of Poland in 1793. It was regained by Poles in 1807 and included within the short-lived Duchy of Warsaw, and after the duchy's dissolution in 1815, it was reannexed by Prussia, and was also part of Germany from 1871. Following World War I, Poland regained independence and control of the village.

Poles from Bojanice were among the victims of a massacre perpetrated by German troops in nearby Zdziechowa on 10 September 1939, during the invasion of Poland which started World War II (see Nazi crimes against the Polish nation).
