= Polska Wieś, Gniezno County =

Polska Wieś
- Village
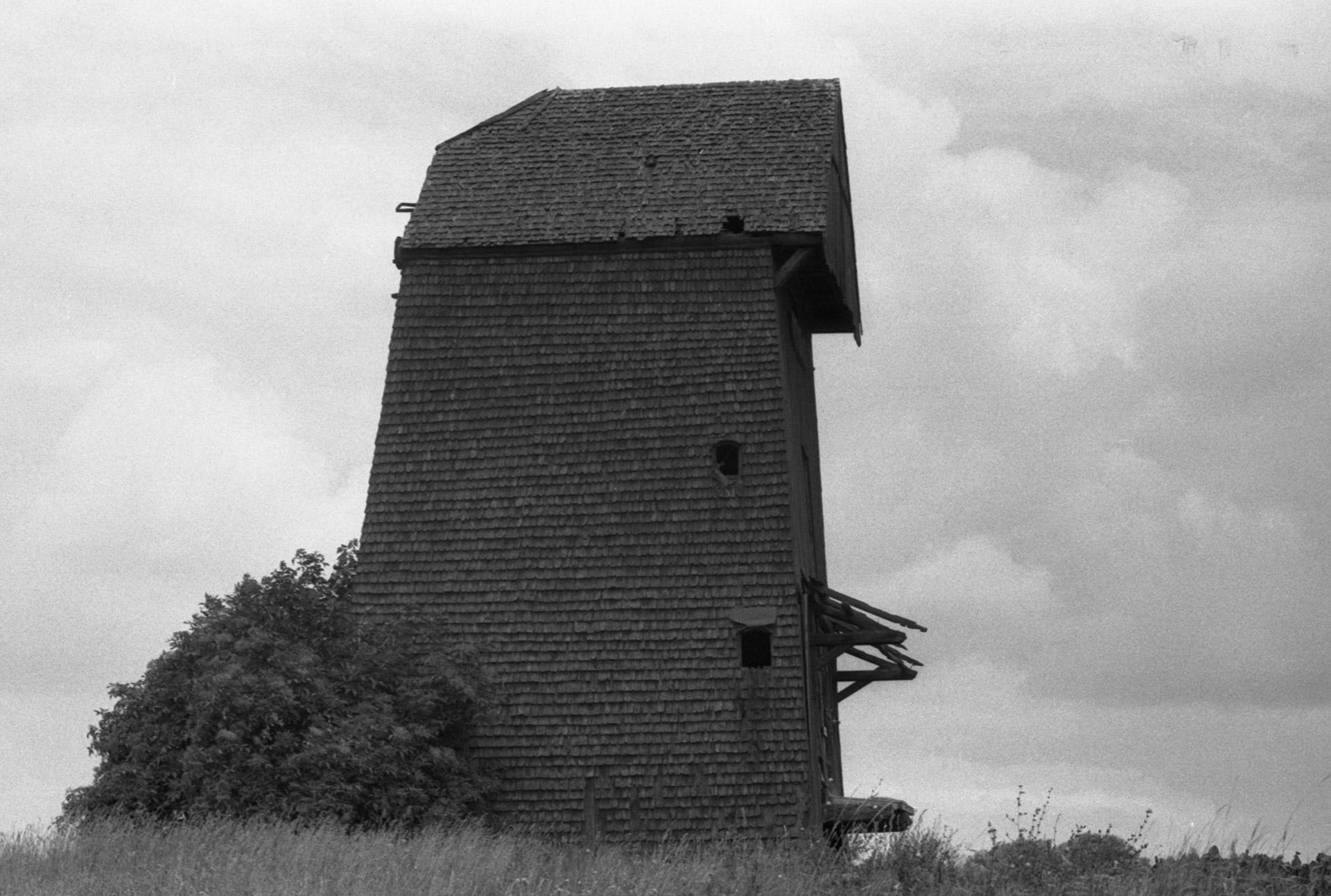
- A shingled windmill (koźlak) in Polska Wieś (photo from the late 1980s)

- Location within Poland
- Coordinates: 52°38′N 17°25′E
- Country: Poland
- Voivodeship: Greater Poland Voivodeship
- County: Gniezno
- Gmina: Kłecko
- Population: 242
- Postal Code: 62-270
- Area code: +48 61
- Car plates: PGN

Polska Wieś ([ˈpɔlska ˈvjɛɕ]; German: Paulsdorf) is a village in the administrative district of Gmina Kłecko, within Gniezno County, Greater Poland Voivodeship, in west-central Poland. In the years 1975-1998, the village administratively belonged to the Poznań Voivodeship. According to the 2021 National Census, Polska Wieś was inhabited by 242 inhabitants, of which 49.6% were women and 50.4% men.

== History ==
Polska Wieś was one of the few villages located in the Middle Ages under the so-called Polish law (at that time, a location based on Magdeburg law was much more popular). The village probably existed before 1523 and was part of the Kłecko starosty, created as a result of the division of the Środa starosty. In the years 1580 - 1620 the village belonged to the Czarnkowski family. In 1771 the village paid a sheaf tithe to the parish priests of St. George in Gniezno, and its owner was Antoni Mirosławski. From April 9, 1901 to the incorporation of Greater Poland into the Polish state (1919) and during the German occupation, the village was called Paulsdorf.
