= Happiness Is Easy =

Studio album by Myslovitz
- Released: 19 May 2006
- Genre: Rock
- Length: 53:59
- Label: Capitol / Pomaton EMI
- Producer: M. Cieślak, R. Paczkowski

Myslovitz chronology
Skalary, mieczyki, neonki (2004)	Happiness Is Easy (2006)	Nieważne, jak wysoko jesteśmy… (2011)

Happiness Is Easy (released on 19 May 2006) is the eighth studio album by Polish alternative rock band Myslovitz. The album overlooks Skalary, mieczyki, neonki's psychedelic soundscapes and returns to sounds of 1999's Miłość w czasach popkultury and 2002's Korova Milky Bar in the first and second half of the album respectively.

The title of the album is taken from the name of the first track on Talk Talk's album The Colour of Spring. Further reference to new wave music is found in the title of track seven, which references Talking Heads (but, also or even more probably, to Krzysztof Kieślowski's documentary movie from 1980 - "Gadające głowy"(Talking Heads).

The songs make multiple references to recent news stories at the time of recording, and so, "Książę życia umiera" is about George Best's "Don't die like me" message. "W deszczu maleńkich żółtych kwiatów" is notable as the first Myslovitz song to feature a female vocal, with Maria Peszek singing in duet with Artur Rojek. "Ściąć wysokie drzewa" refers to the Hotel Rwanda movie - the title translates as "cut down tall trees" - a coded message broadcast by Hutu-friendly TV stations, starting the Tutsi massacre.

== Track listing ==
1. "Fikcja jest modna" (Fiction Is Trendy) - 2:37
2. "Ściąć wysokie drzewa" (Cut Down The Tall Trees) - 4:23
3. "Mieć czy być" (To Have or To Be) - 3:12
4. "Spacer w bokserskich rękawicach" (A Walk in Boxing Gloves) - 3:34
5. "Kilka uścisków, kilka snów" (A Couple of Hugs, a Couple of Dreams) - 4:07
6. "W deszczu maleńkich żółtych kwiatów" (In A Rain of Tiny Yellow Flowers) - 4:52
7. "Gadające głowy 80-06" (Talking Heads 80-06) - 4:30
8. "Ty i ja i wszystko co mamy" (You and I and Everything We Have) - 3:40
9. "Nocnym pociągiem aż do końca świata" (On A Night Train To The End of The World) - 4:26
10. "Książę życia umiera" (The Prince of Life Dies) - 3:41
11. "Złe mi się śni" (I've Got Bad Dreams) - 3:34
12. "Znów wszystko poszło nie tak" (Everything Went Wrong Again) - 4:25
13. "Czytanka dla niegrzecznych" (A Reading Book for Naughty Children) - 6:50

=== Singles ===
- "Mieć czy być" (won a popular vote for being the first single from the album) (2006)
- "Nocnym pociągiem aż do końca świata" (2006)
- "W deszczu maleńkich żółtych kwiatów" (2007)
- "Znów wszystko poszło nie tak" (2007)

== Personnel ==
Myslovitz:

- Artur Rojek - lead vocal, guitars
- Przemysław Myszor - guitars, keyboards
- Wojciech Powaga - guitars
- Jacek Kuderski - bass guitar, backing vocals
- Wojciech Kuderski - drums

and also:

- Andrzej Smolik - steel guitar (track 2)
- Maria Peszek - co-lead vocal on "W deszczu maleńkich żółtych kwiatów"
- Maciej Cieślak - keyboards (track 3), guitar (track 5), producer
- Rafał Paczkowski - piano (tracks 5, 7), Rhodes organ (track 6), producer
- Wojciech Wołyniak - programming (track 8)
