= Statek kosmiczny Ścianka =

Studio album by Ścianka
- Released: June 1998
- Recorded: February–March 1998; Studio im. Adama Mickiewicza, Sopot
- Genre: Rock
- Label: Biodro Records; BRCD 002
- Producer: Ścianka & Piotr Pawlak

Ścianka chronology
Robaki (demo tape) (1998)	Statek kosmiczny Ścianka (1998)	Dni wiatru (2001)

Statek kosmiczny Ścianka (Ścianka the Spaceship; often abbreviated to Statek kosmiczny) released in 1998 was the debut album of Polish rock group Ścianka. The album was recorded in Maciek Cieślak's home studio in Sopot. It received a Fryderyk Award nomination in "Debut of the year" category and was awarded best debut album of the year by Tylko Rock magazine. There were no singles promoting the album, but "Skuter" received the status of Ścianka's biggest hit among their fans. "Skuter" was also chosen by Artur Rojek to be official song for the 2nd Off Festival in 2007.

== Recording and production ==
Statek kosmiczny Ścianka was Ścianka's first studio album. Maciej Cieślak decided to sign Ścianka on newly founded record label, Tymon Tymański's Biodro Records. The entire album was recorded in guitarist's home studio in the basement of old house in Mickiewicza Street in Sopot. Four songs ("Insect power", "Ścianka", "Skuter" and "Sopot") were previously unofficially released in their raw versions on a demo tape entitled Robaki.

According to Cieślak, at first Tymański wished to issue a debut album of another Tricity alternative band, Grzegorz Nawrocki's Ego. Because Ego's Światowid was released by Antena Krzyku label, Tymański's decided to release Statek kosmiczny instead, after attending one of Ścianka live performances.

Shortly after the release, Ścianka underwent a major change in personnel, when Vietnamese bassist Tran Chi was replaced with Andrzej Koczan. Tran Chi left Poland and went France, reportedly because of private or political issues.

== Promotion ==
Both band and Biodro Records agree, that promotion of the album was inadequate. A music video to "Piosenka No 3" was created; it was directed by Dawid Marcinkowski.

== Critical response ==
Professional ratings
Review scores
Source	Rating
Porcys	7.1/10 link
Machina	link
XL	positive link
Brum	positive link
Tylko Rock	5/5 stars

Statek kosmiczny received almost strictly positive reviews from Polish music critics. Problems with classification of Ścianka's music led to creation of jocose descriptive term "post-fuckin'avant-hendrix'grunge-noise-rock". Their style was compared to The Jon Spencer Blues Explosion, The Residents, Hawkwind, The Stooges, Captain Beefheart, Velvet Underground, MC5, Pink Floyd, and modern noise-rock artists signed to Amphetamine Reptile and SKiN GRAFT Records, as well.

== Chart performance and sales ==
The album was a relatively big commercial success, and was sold in more than 5,000 copies. It is currently out of print and unavailable in Biodro Records' catalogue.

== Track listing ==
1. [untitled] – 0:10
2. "Skuter" – 2:32 (Scooter)
3. [untitled] – 0:29
4. "Ścianka" – 7:18 (Backing)
5. "Piosenka nr 3" – 3:45 (Song number 3)
6. "Insect power" – 2:34
7. [untitled] – 0:05
8. "Czerwone kozaki" – 7:51 (Red high boots)
9. "Sopot" – 2:56
10. "Trans-Atlantyk" – 8:57 (Trans-atlantic)
11. [untitled] – 0:41
12. "Sprawa 5-ciu pracowników Instytutu Badań Kosmicznych, zbiegłych w kwietniu 1973 z terenu zakładu w Beskid Wschodni i tam doszczętnie zdziczałych" - 0:30 (The case of five workers of Space Research Institute, who in April 1973 escaped from the Institute area into the mountains of Eastern Beskid, where they became completely wild)
13. "Chudy" – 3:12 (Thin)
14. "Down there low" – 7:54
15. "Sopot II" – 3:53
16. [untitled] – 0:05
17. "Piórko" – 6:39 (Little feather)
18. "Ja nie" – 5:07 (I don't)

== Personnel ==
- Maciej Cieślak – guitar, voice
- Jacek Lachowicz – keyboards, voice
- Tran Chi – bass
- Arkady Kowalczyk – drums.
