= Myslovitz (album) =

Studio album by Myslovitz
- Released: October 10, 1995
- Genre: Rock
- Length: 53:49
- Label: MJM Music Poland
- Producer: Ian Harris / Myslovitz

Myslovitz chronology
Myslovitz (1995)	Sun Machine (1996)

Myslovitz is a debut studio album by Polish alternative rock band Myslovitz, released in 1995. The album is divided into two parts and contains 11 tracks. The first 6 tracks are melodious pop-rock compositions, while the remaining are mostly psychedelic ballads. Many of their songs were characterized by a two-part vocal. The release of this album also began Myslovitz's career in the Polish field of music.

== Track listing ==
All music and lyrics by Myslovitz, except track 5 (lyrics Marek Jałowiecki) and track 10 (lyrics Marcin Porczek)

1. "Kobieta" (Woman)
2. "Papierowe Skrzydła" (Paper Wings)
3. "Myslovitz"
4. "Zgon" (Death)
5. "Przedtem" (Before)
6. "Krótka Piosenka o Miłości" (A Short Song About Love)
7. "Maj" (May)
8. "Wyznanie" (Confession)
9. "Deszcz" (Rain)
10. "Good Day My Angel"
11. "Moving Revolution"

== Singles ==
- 1995 Myslovitz
- 1995 Zgon (Death)
- 1995 Krótka Piosenka o Miłości (A Short Song About Love)
- 1996 Maj (May)

== Re-editions ==
2002 "Best Of The Best Gold"
2005 "Myslovitz" (remaster) with additional tracks:

- 12. Myslovitz - remix '95 (4:16)
- 13. Drive Blind (Ride cover) (4:15)
- 14. Blue Velvet - live '96 (3:00)

== Personnel ==
Myslovitz:

- Artur Rojek - lead vocal, guitars
- Wojciech Powaga - guitars
- Jacek Kuderski - bass guitar, backing vocals
- Wojciech Kuderski - drums

and also:

- Andrzej Smolik - keyboards
- Andrzej Zachary - trumpet
- Ian Harris - producer, recording
- Michał Targowski - recording
- Sławomir Jurek - artwork
