= Impressions (instrumental composition) =

Jazz standard composed by John Coltrane

"Impressions" is a jazz standard composed by John Coltrane. Coltrane only recorded the composition during two studio dates—on June 20, 1962 and March 6, 1963. The 1962 recordings were released on the 2002 deluxe edition of the 1962 album Coltrane and elsewhere. The 1963 recordings were released on the 2018 posthumous album Both Directions at Once: The Lost Album.

Coltrane recorded "Impressions" many times live, beginning with his 1961 engagement at the Village Vanguard. These performances produced the third track on the 1963 album of the same name, as well as two further renditions available on The Complete 1961 Village Vanguard Recordings. At least a dozen further live performances exist on various live albums up to 1965.

Its chord sequence is identical to that of Miles Davis' "So What" (16 bars of D Dorian, 8 bars of E♭ Dorian, and 8 bars of D Dorian). Both pieces originate in Ahmad Jamal's 1955 cover of Morton Gould's "Pavanne"

Michael Brecker won the 1996 Grammy for Best Jazz Instrumental Solo for his performance on this piece, as recorded for the Grammy-winning jazz album by McCoy Tyner, Infinity.

== Performances ==
- Gerald Albright – Live at Birdland West (1991)
- Miłość – Talkin' About Life and Death (1999)
- Esbjörn Svensson
- Wes Montgomery – A live performance of "Impressions" with the Wynton Kelly Trio first appeared on the posthumous release Willow Weep for Me; it was recorded at the same gigs that produced the earlier Smokin' at the Half Note, and was subsequently included in CD reissues of the latter album. It was also captured for Belgian TV VRT's show "Jazz Prisma" in 1965, making it one of the rare filmed appearances of Wes Montgomery.
- Stanley Turrentine – Sugar (1970); T Time (1995)
- Pat Martino – Consciousness (1975)
- McCoy Tyner – Trident (1975); Infinity (1995)
- Larry Coryell – Air Dancing (1988)
- Anthony Braxton – London Solo (1988); Quartet (Standards) 2020 (2020)
- Steve Grossman – In New York (1991)
- Frank Morgan – City Nights: Live at the Jazz Standard (2004)
- Hiromi - Blue Giant (2023)

== See also ==
- List of jazz contrafacts
