= Lenny Valentino =

Polish dream pop band

- Origin: Mysłowice, Poland
- Genres: Dream pop
- Years active: 1998–2001; 2006; 2010–2011
- Label: Sissy Records
- Members: Artur Rojek; Maciej Cieślak; Mietall Waluś; Jacek Lachowicz; Arkady Kowalczyk
- Past members: Michał Koterba; Bartosz Królikowski; Wojciech Kuderski

Lenny Valentino was a Polish dream pop band from Mysłowice that formed in 1998. Its primary songwriter is vocalist and guitarist Artur Rojek of the band Myslovitz. The rest of the band's founding lineup consists of Mietall Waluś (bass), Michał Koterba (guitar), and Wojciech Kuderski (drums). They disbanded in 2001.

The band is named after the 1994 song "Lenny Valentino" by British band The Auteurs. Kuderski was replaced on drums by Bartosz Królikowski in 1999. In 2000, Lenny Valentino underwent further personnel changes and added all three members of Ścianka—Maciej Cieślak (guitar), Arkady Kowalczyk (drums), and Jacek Lachowicz (keyboard).

Their first and only album, Uwaga! Jedzie tramwaj (roughly: Watch out! The tram is coming), was recorded in April 2001 and produced by Cieślak. The album was released on 12 November 2001 on Sissy Records, a branch of BMG. Uwaga! Jedzie tramwaj received mostly positive reviews, including an MTV Poland award.

After touring Poland in support of their album, Lenny Valentino disbanded in December 2001 and the members focused on other projects. Rojek continued to work with Myslovitz, Waluś focused on Negatyw's debut album Paczatarez, and the other three returned to Ścianka.

In 2006, they performed at Off Festival, of which Rojek is creative director, in their hometown Mysłowice.

== Members ==
- Artur Rojek (1998–2001) — vocals, guitar; member of Myslovitz
- Mietall Waluś (1998–2001) — bass; member of Penny Lane, Negatyw, Kurtyna
- Michał Koterba (1998–2000) — guitar; member of Korbowód
- Wojciech "Lala" Kuderski (1998–1999) — drums; member of Myslovitz, Penny Lane
- Bartosz Królikowski (1999–2000) — drums
- Maciej Cieślak (2000–2001) — guitar; member of Ścianka
- Arkady Kowalczyk (2000–2001) — drums; member of Ścianka
- Jacek Lachowicz (2000–2001) — keyboard; member of Ścianka, Kobiety

== Discography ==
Title	Album details	Peak chart positions
Title	Album details	POL
Uwaga! Jedzie tramwaj	Released: 12 November 2001; Label: Sissy Records/BMG Poland; Formats: CD	11
"—" denotes a recording that did not chart or was not released in that territory.
