= Sun Machine =

Studio album by Myslovitz
- Released: 1996
- Genre: Rock
- Length: 45:41
- Label: Sony Music Polska
- Producer: Andrzej Wojciechowski

Myslovitz chronology
Myslovitz (1995)	Sun Machine (1996)	Z rozmyślań przy śniadaniu (1997)

Sun Machine is the second album by Polish alternative rock band Myslovitz.

== Track listing ==
All music and lyrics by Myslovitz, except track 1 (music by Marek Jałowiecki, lyrics by Turlough O'Carolan), track 7 (music and lyrics by Marek Jałowiecki), track 9 (music by Jerzy Kossela, lyrics by Krzysztof Klenczon), track 10 (lyrics by Marcin Porczek) and track 11 (music and lyrics by David Bowie).

1. "Peggy Brown"
2. "Blue Velvet"
3. "Z twarzą Marilyn Monroe" (With a Face Like Marilyn Monroe)
4. "Jim Best"
5. "Amfetaminowa siostra" (Amphetamine sister)
6. "Pierwszy raz (z Michelle J.)" (My first time with Michelle J.)
7. "Bunt szesnastolatki" (A rebellion of sixteen years old girl)
8. "Funny Hill"
9. "Historia jednej znajomości" (The history of a certain acquaintance)
10. "Good Day My Angel"
11. "Memory of a Free Festival"

== Personnel ==
Myslovitz:

- Artur Rojek - lead vocal, guitars
- Przemysław Myszor - guitars, keyboards
- Wojciech Powaga - guitars
- Jacek Kuderski - bass guitar, backing vocals, lead vocal on "Bunt szesnastolatki"
- Wojciech Kuderski - drums

and also:

- Andrzej Smolik - keyboards
- Ian Harris - lead vocals on track 10
- Andrzej Paweł Wojciechowski - producer
