= Z rozmyślań przy śniadaniu =

Album by Myslovitz

Studio album by Myslovitz
- Released: 1997
- Genre: Rock
- Length: 60:26
- Label: Sony Music Polska
- Producer: Tomasz Bonarowski

Myslovitz chronology
Sun Machine (1996)	Z rozmyślań przy śniadaniu (1997)	Miłość w czasach popkultury (1999)

Z rozmyślań przy śniadaniu (From Meditations over Breakfast) is the third album by Polish alternative rock band Myslovitz. The album displays a tendency towards a more "polished" sound and more introspective lyrics.

Myslovitz's now typical fascination with cinema also begins to take centre stage with numerous allusions and hints in the lyrics and track titles, and a certain "cinematic" atmosphere in the music itself.

== Track listing ==
All tracks written by Myslovitz:

1. "Zwykły dzień" (Ordinary Day);
2. "Scenariusz dla moich sąsiadów" (Script for My Neighbours);
3. "Przebudzenie" (Awakening);
4. "Uciekinier" (The Fugitive);
5. "Anioł" (Angel);
6. "Margaret";
7. "Filmowa Miłość" (Film Love);
8. "Z rozmyślań przy śniadaniu" (From Meditations over Breakfast);
9. "Przemijania" (The Passings);
10. "Dwie myśli" (Two Thoughts);
11. "Zawód fotograf" (Profession: Photographer);
12. "Głosy" (Voices);
13. "Do utraty tchu" (Breathless);
14. "Myszy i ludzie" (Of Mice and Men);
15. "Fabryczna" (Factory Road);
16. "Wielki błękit" (The Great Blue);
17. "James, radiogłowi i żuk z rewolwerem jadą donikąd" (James, the Radioheads and the Beetle with Revolver Ride to Nowhere).

=== Singles ===
- 1997 Scenariusz dla moich sąsiadów (Script for My Neighbours)
- 1997 Margaret
- 1998 To nie był film (That Was Not a Film)
- 1998 Zwykły dzień (Ordinary Day)

== Personnel ==
Myslovitz:

- Artur Rojek - lead vocal, guitars
- Przemysław Myszor - guitars, keyboards
- Wojciech Powaga - guitars
- Jacek Kuderski - bass guitar, acoustic guitar, tambourine, backing vocals
- Wojciech Kuderski - drums

and also:

- Andrzej Smolik - keyboards (tracks 2, 8, 9, 12, 16)
- Tomasz Bonarowski - backing vocals (track 10), Wah-Wah guitar (track 8), producer
- Roman Dmowski - recording
- Grzegorz Piwkowski - mastering
