= Planeta =

Planeta or El Planeta means (the) planet in multiple languages. It may refer to:

== Film, TV and publications ==
- El Planeta, a Boston-based Spanish language newspaper
- El Planeta (Ecuador), an Ecuadorian newspaper, see List of newspapers in Ecuador
- El Planeta (film), a 2021 film directed by Amalia Ulman
- Planeta Group, a Spanish media group based in Madrid
  - Planeta DeAgostini, a subsidiary of Grupo Planeta specializing in collectable books
- Planeta.ru, a Russian crowdfunding site
- Planeta TV, a Bulgarian music television channel
- Premio Planeta de Novela, a Spanish literary prize
- RTR-Planeta, the international service of the Russian broadcaster VGTRK

== Other uses ==
- Planeta (surname)
- "El Planeta" (Antonio Fernández, c. 1770 – 1850), notable flamenco singer
- El Planeta, an album by London-based theatre music band Von Magnet

== See also ==
- Casseta & Planeta, a Brazilian group of comedians
- Deuterocopus planeta, a moth of the family Pterophoridae
- Ensemble Planeta, a Japanese all-female a cappella group
- Lingwa de planeta, a constructed international auxiliary language
- Moya Planeta, a Russian television channel
- Los Planetas, a Spanish indie group
- Pan Planeta, an album by Polish rock band Ścianka
- Planeta Bur, a 1962 Soviet science fiction film
- Planeta Rica, a town and municipality in Colombia
- Planeta U, an American children's program
