= P.O.L.O.V.I.R.U.S. =

Studio album by Kury
- Released: January 26, 1998
- Recorded: March–June 1997, Biodro Studios, Gdańsk
- Genre: Rock, comedy rock
- Length: 50:09
- Label: Biodro Records BRCD 001; BRCD 023 (re-edition)
- Producer: Piotr Pawlak, Tymon Tymański

Kury chronology
Kablox-Niesłyna Histaria (1995)	P.O.L.O.V.I.R.U.S. (1998)	Na żywo w Pstrągu (1999)

Professional ratings
Review scores
Source	Rating
pl:Porcys	6.8/10
Tylko Rock	4.5/5 stars

P.O.L.O.V.I.R.U.S. is the second album by the Polish group Kury, released in 1998.

The album won a Fryderyk for Album of the Year - Alternative. "Jesienna deprecha" was nominated for song of the year. The band also got nominations for group of the year and video of the year.

== Track listing ==
1. "Śmierdzi mi z ust" (Tymański) – 3:11
2. "Jesienna deprecha" (Tymański) – 3:40
3. "Nie martw się, Janusz" (Tymański-Deriglasoff-Pawlak) – 5:35
4. "Dlaczego" (Tymański-Deriglasoff-Pawlak) – 2:35
5. "gadka I" – 0:25
6. "Kibolski" (Tymański-Deriglasoff-Pawlak) – 4:24
7. "gadka II" – 1:15
8. "Sztany, glany" (Deriglasoff-mel.trad.) – 4:22
9. "Ideały Sierpnia" (Tymański-Handschke) – 1:51
10. "Trygław cz. I" (Tymański-Pawlak-Olter) – 0:19
11. "Nie mam jaj" (Tymański) – 3:23
12. "Trygław cz. II" (Tymański-Pawlak-Olter) – 1:27
13. "Szatan" (Tymański) – 1:24
14. "gadka III" – 2:28
15. "Mój dżez" (Tymański) – 2:55
16. "Adam ma dobry Humer" (Tymański-mel.trad.) – 1:25
17. "O psie" (Tymański) – 2:08
18. "Lemur/ noktowidzenije Kryszak-Roshiego" (Tymański-Gwinciński) – 7:07

== Personnel ==
- Ryszard Tymon Tymański – voice, guitar, bass guitar
- Piotr Pawlak – guitar, voice
- Jacek Olter – drums
- Olaf Deriglasoff – samples, voice
- Leszek Możdżer – piano, keyboards, voice
- Jerzy Mazzoll – clarinet, voice
- Tomasz Gwinciński – guitar
- Jacek Siciarek – voice
- Radowan Jacuniak – voice
- Larry "Okey" Ugwu – voice
- Grzegorz Nawrocki – voice
- Mirosław Rymarz – voice
- Tofil – voice
