= List of cultural references to A Clockwork Orange =

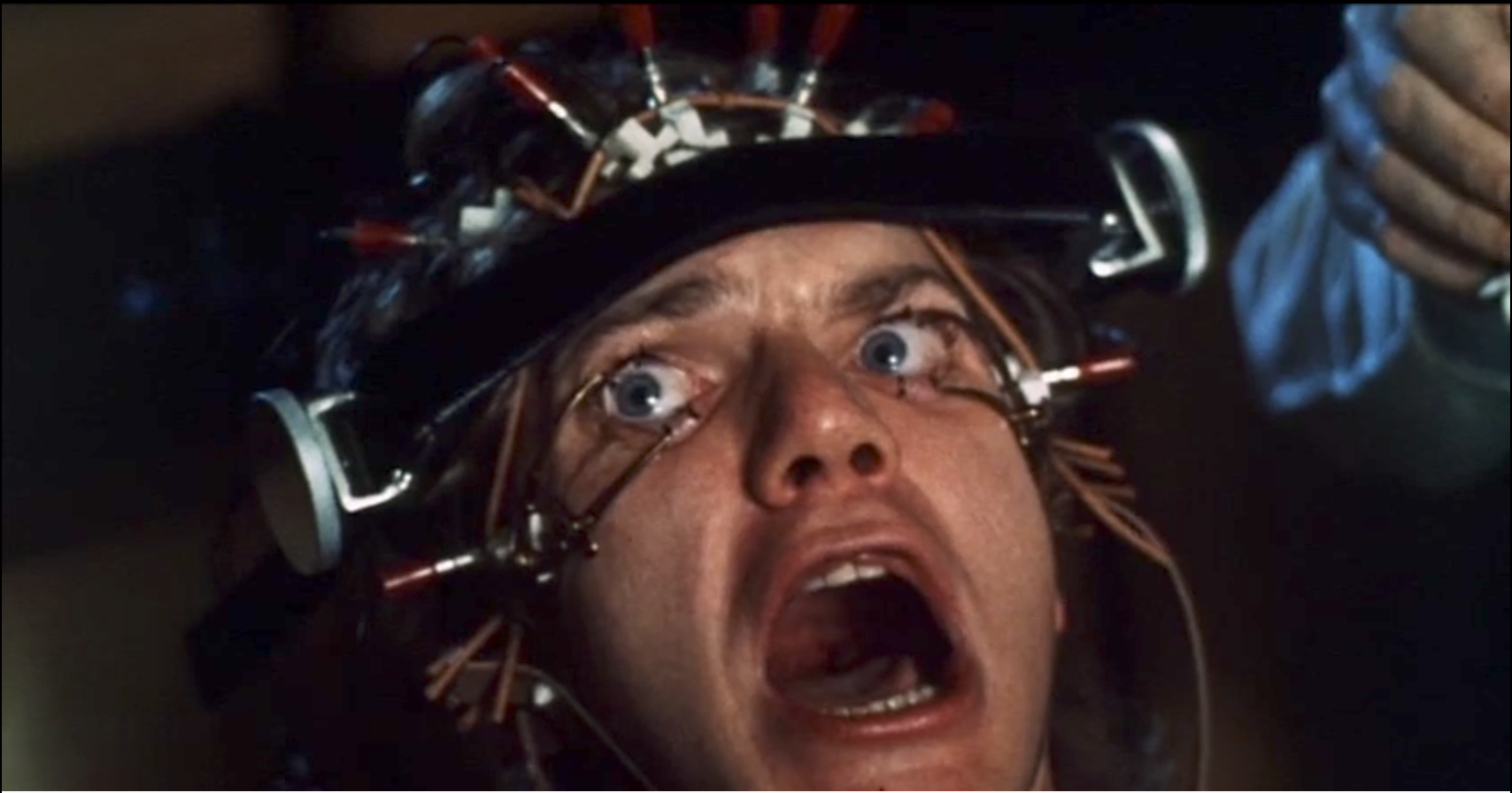
Still from "A Clockwork Orange"

Popular culture references to Anthony Burgess' novel A Clockwork Orange (1962) and Stanley Kubrick's 1971 film adaptation have been wide-ranging, from popular music and television to movies and other media. Some references are based on themes central to the story, such as the use of Nadsat words or phrases, whilst others have incorporated visual elements from the film. The film made Kubrick one of the most influential artists of the 20th century, and the film has become a cult classic.

== Fashion ==
- The film version influenced bands' fashion styles.

== Films ==
- The film version of A Clockwork Orange immediately revolutionized the science fiction film genre, opening the way for other films to portray elaborate dystopian narratives and to intelligently analyze social dilemmas. Many film directors have borrowed themes and cinematic techniques from the film. The film is an essential part of modern cinema and films often reference it, with examples of films using similar cinematic techniques to A Clockwork Orange including THX 1138 (1971), Westworld (1973) and A Boy and His Dog (1975). The June 2006 issue of Entertainment Weekly named A Clockwork Orange the second most controversial film of all time, after The Passion of the Christ.
- The film Bronson (2008), which depicts the life of Britain's longest-serving prisoner Michael Peterson, is often cited as having many stylistic and thematic similarities to A Clockwork Orange, including homages to many specific scenes in Kubrick's film. While not a direct remake or sequel, Bronson borrows visual and narrative elements from A Clockwork Orange, particularly in its presentation of violence and its exploration of a protagonist grappling with societal control and individual expression.
- The Filipino film Batch '81 (1982) contains several visual references to A Clockwork Orange while also echoing similar themes. During pre-production of Batch '81, director Mike de Leon had the creative team watch several foreign films, including A Clockwork Orange.
- The torture scene in Reservoir Dogs (1992), set to "Stuck in the Middle With You", was described by Quentin Tarantino in an interview as a direct reference to the scene in A Clockwork Orange where Alex kicks the writer and rapes his wife to the tune of "Singin' in the Rain". A Clockwork Orange is also referenced at the beginning of the film when all the men are walking in slow motion, as Alex and his droogs did.
- In Trainspotting (1996), director Danny Boyle references the bar Alex and his droogs sit in during the opening scene, where a club has similar text-based wall art, and set to "Temptation" by Heaven 17 who took their name from a fictional group in A Clockwork Orange.
- In Gangster No. 1, a 2000 British crime film, Malcolm McDowell, who played Alex in the film, plays the protagonist gangster as a sort of older version of Alex.
- The protagonist in Good Bye, Lenin! (2003) is named Alex, and the film features a furniture-shifting scene set to a sped-up synthesized version of the "William Tell Overture".
- In Richard E. Grant's film Wah-Wah (2005), the main character, a young version of Grant, takes comfort in watching a late-night screening of the film.
- In the film Tenacious D in the Pick of Destiny (2006), Jack Black, while trying to sleep on a park bench, is assaulted by a gang dressed as the droogs.
- Heath Ledger said he was inspired by Alex DeLarge to play the Joker in The Dark Knight (2008). While preparing for the film, he kept a journal containing many images, notes, and dialogue excerpts on A Clockwork Orange.
- The 2021 film Space Jam: A New Legacy features multiple background extras dressed as the Droogs among a crowd with many other unrelated characters. The revelation of this cameo caused some controversy due to the earlier-announced exclusion of Pepe Le Pew from the film for his sexual misconduct within his cartoons, despite Alex and company being guilty of far worse.
- The Spanish-French film Murder in a Blue World (1973) takes some cuts.
- The Mexican film Un Mundo Maravilloso (2006) has a scene that mimics the one where Alex is fed by the politician.
- In the 2022 film Avatar: The Way of Water, in a video of Colonel Miles Quaritch (Stephen Lang), he refers to himself as, "your humble narrator," a phrase used by Alex when addressing the reader.

== Literature ==
The original Chinese title of A Perfect Crime (下面我该干些什么?) by Chinese author A Yi (translated by Anna Holmwood) was based on the opening line of A Clockwork Orange: "What's it going to be then, eh?"

== Music ==
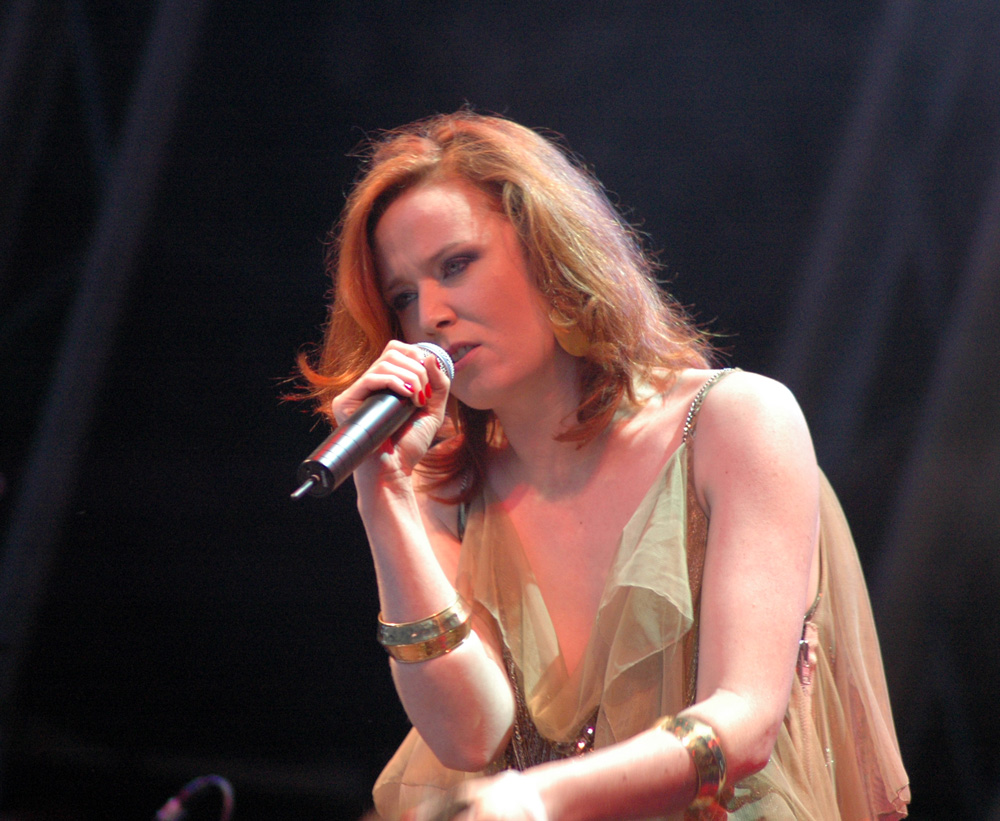
Róisín Murphy, the singer from dance act Moloko who are named after the nadsat word for milk

- David Bowie started most of his concerts during his Ziggy Stardust period with Beethoven's Ninth Symphony from the film's soundtrack, and used the film as inspiration for stage costumes during that time. Bowie's lyric "say droogie don’t crash here!" in the song "Suffragette City" referenced Alex's word for his friends, and many of the lyrics in the song "Girl Loves Me" from his last album, Blackstar, are in Nadsat.
- John Bonham of Led Zeppelin wore an outfit similar to Alex's while touring in 1975.
- A Clockwork Orange, like other dystopian science fiction novels, had an important influence on industrial and cyberpunk music.
- The WEA subsidiary record label Korova, named for the film's Korova Milk Bar, was founded in 1979 for post-punk band Echo & the Bunnymen and later issued recordings by artists such as The Sound and Strawberry Switchblade.
- Yugoslav heavy metal band Pomaranča (Orange), formed in 1979, chose their name inspired by the novel and Stanley Kubircks's film. Their debut album was entitled Peklenska Pomaranča (Hell Orange)—which was the Yugoslav translation of the film's title—and their 1981 single "Mleko s noži" ("Milk with Knives") referred to the drink served in the film's Korova Milk Bar.
- Heaven 17, a synthpop band from Sheffield, England who formed in 1980, named themselves after a fictional pop group in the book and film.
- Rosemary's Babies, a hardcore punk band from Lodi, New Jersey recorded the song "Ultraviolence, Sex and Death", for their Blood Lust EP later released on their compilation CD Talking to the Dead. Members of the band often dressed as Droogs on stage.
- The group New Order who, like Anthony Burgess were from Manchester, titled one of their songs "Ultra-Violence" on their album Power, Corruption and Lies (1983).
- The 1987 music video for "Welcome to the Jungle" by Guns N' Roses featured scenes of lead singer Axl Rose strapped in a chair with a brace on his forehead while watching stacked televisions with various images of violence and sex, much like the Ludovico technique.
- In 1988, German punk rock band Die Toten Hosen released a concept album Ein kleines bisschen Horrorschau (a reference to Alex's Nadsat phrase, "a bit of [the old] horrorshow [ultraviolence])", including the single "Hier Kommt Alex" ("Here Comes Alex"). The members were also involved as musicians in a German stage production of A Clockwork Orange in 1988, and in 1994 they released an English version called "The Return of Alex".
- The Beastie Boys make two references to A Clockwork Orange in their song "Looking Down the Barrel of a Gun" from their 1989 album Paul's Boutique; the first being the verse "ultra-violence be running through my head" and "(I am) like Clockwork Orange, goin' off on the town; got home-boys bonanza, to beat your ass down."
- The 1991 single release of U2's "The Fly" featured the B-side "Alex Descends Into Hell for a Bottle of Milk/Korova 1", from the score of the Royal Shakespeare Company's production of A Clockwork Orange. The performance was scored by Bono and The Edge.
- British indie group Campag Velocet took the word "Velocet" in their name from a word written on the wall in the opening scene of the film.
- Anglo-Irish band Moloko, who debuted in 1995, took their name from the slang term for milk (itself from the Russian word for milk, молоко)
- Blur borrowed imagery from A Clockwork Orange for the music video to their song "The Universal" (1995).
- The music video for "Pacifier" by Shihad, from their 1999 album The General Electric featured the band dressed as droogs in the Korova Milk Bar and also reenacting the film's joyride scene.
- American rapper Cage originally used the stage name "Alex", after the novel's protagonist. Cage's 2002 debut, Movies for the Blind, featured a song titled "Agent Orange", in which he sampled Wendy Carlos' "Title Music from A Clockwork Orange" and paraphrased the opening scene of the film, in which Alex and his friends are drinking spiked milk and deciding what to do for the night.
- The title and music video of Rob Zombie's "Never Gonna Stop (The Red Red Kroovy)" were inspired by the film.
- Kylie Minogue wore a white jumper and fake eyelashes, similar to Alex's, while performing on her 2001 Fever tour.
- Polish band Myslovitz's album Korova Milky Bar (2002) referred to the film, comparing it to the present situation in Poland.
- Gnarls Barkley dressed as characters in the film for a 2006 publicity shoot.
- Cavalera Conspiracy's 2008 song "Ultra-Violent" was based on A Clockwork Orange.
- The Sepultura album A-Lex (2009) was based on A Clockwork Orange.
- In her unreleased 2009 song "Hundred Dollar Bill", Lana Del Rey referenced the book: "Cause I love your ultra-violent swing, I like it when you treat me mean". The title of her album Ultraviolence (2014) was also a reference to A Clockwork Orange.

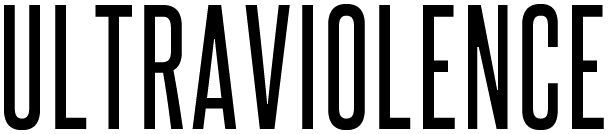
Lana Del Ray Ultraviolence logo

- The title of Arjen Anthony Lucassen's Star One second album, Victims of the Modern Age (2010), was a direct quote from the film. The title track was based on A Clockwork Orange, with Russell Allen from Symphony X singing as the character Alex.
- My Chemical Romance frontman Gerard Way occasionally dressed as Alex, and the band's 2010 album Danger Days: The True Lives of the Fabulous Killjoys was inspired by the film.
- Lady Gaga used music from the film as entrance music during concerts in 2010.
- Rihanna's outfit for her "You Da One" music video (2011) was inspired by the film.
- Arctic Monkeys's album Suck It and See (2011) is named after the graffiti outside of the broken elevator inside of Alex's decrepit apartment building. Coincidentally, also the band's frontman's first name is Alex.
- Marilyn Manson dresses up as Alex DeLarge in his video "Tattooed in Reverse" (2018).

== Periodicals ==
- "A Crockwork Lemon", a Mad satire by writer Stan Hart and artist George Woodbridge, appeared in the June 1973 issue. Norman Mingo's illustration for the cover showed Alfred E. Neuman as Alex.

== Television ==
- In the Get a Life episode "Houseboy 2000" (10 March 1991), Chris is restrained in a chair with his eyes bound open by his friend Larry who then forces Chris to watch a video during which "March from A Clockwork Orange (Ninth Symphony, Fourth Movement, Abridged)" plays, in an attempt to break Chris of his conditioning.
- The Simpsons contains frequent references to the film. In the episode "Dog of Death" (12 March 1992), Mr. Burns brainwashes the Simpsons' dog Santa's Little Helper into being one of his attack dogs by using the Ludovico technique. In the episode "A Streetcar Named Marge", Bart speaks in a British accent and says "Can I slog off school tomorrow? Got a pain in me gulliver", similarly to how Alex says "Bit of a pain in the gulliver, mum" as an excuse to miss school. In the episode "Treehouse of Horror III" (29 October 1992), Bart dresses up as Alex DeLarge from the film. Also, in the episode "Duffless" (18 February 1993), as a result of Lisa's electroshock therapy, Bart experiences difficulty in reaching for the cupcakes after dinner, in a manner similar to the effects of Alex's therapy; in particular, one shot parodies the film, with Bart looking up at the cupcakes on the table, in the same way Alex looks up to a naked woman's breasts after therapy. In the episode "Treehouse of Horror XXI", at the end of a segment titled "Master and Cadaver", Maggie is seen wearing Alex's hat and eyelash. She drinks milk from her bottle with the film's theme song playing. On 19 October 2014, the show parodied the film with a segment titled "A Clockwork Yellow" in the episode "Treehouse of Horror XXV".
- There have been many references to the film on South Park; when asked to name something he considered a mind-altering work of art, series co-creator Trey Parker said, "It's super cliché, but A Clockwork Orange really did fuck me up". In the show's controversial 201st episode, "201" (2010), Mitch Connor (Cartman's hand-puppet) pretends to be a black man and asks to use the telephone at someone's house, alluding to the similar scene in A Clockwork Orange. In "Coon 2: Hindsight" (2010), the scene where the Coon attacks the rest of his gang is reminiscent of the scene in which Georgie of Alexʼ Clockwork Orange droogs insists things be run in a "new way" that entails less power for Alex, who responds by attacking them while walking in order to re-establish his leadership.
- In the Phineas and Ferb episode "Phineas and Ferb Get Busted!" (2009), the militaristic reform school the boys are sent to after getting busted uses the Ludovico technique in order to stop Phineas and Ferb from using their imagination.
- In the Archer episode "A Going Concern" (3 February 2011), Archer takes measures to stop the sale of ISIS, including using a modified version of the Ludovico technique.
- In "Contorno", the fifth episode of season 3 of Hannibal (2015), the same section of Gioachino Rossini's The Thieving Magpie (as used in A Clockwork Orange) was played on a record player during a fight between Jack Crawford and Hannibal Lecter in Florence, Italy. Executive producer Bryan Fuller described the scene as "a full-on homage to Kubrick's A Clockwork Orange" on Twitter.
- In Zoku Owarimonogatari (an installment of the Monogatari Series), episode 5 (2019) contained a scene in which the character of Yotsugi was asked to look for a location that was etched onto the back of the main character, Koyomi Araragi. When she lifted his shirt, she discovered that there were no markings and the two characters had a skit together which featured the aforementioned Koyomi with the same machine on his head that was used by Alex DeLarge in the infamous Aversion Therapy scene. The following scene then switched between shots of Koyomi with the machine on his head as well as Yotsugi in the well known "droog costume" as she whips the air around her.
- In the second-season premiere of Clone High, the main characters undergo an "A Clockwork Orange style montage" in which they are forced to watch a presentation explaining everything that had happened in the time they were frozen. This scene is inspired by the Ludovico technique.

== Sports ==
- The Netherlands national football team was nicknamed Clockwork Orange in the 1974 FIFA World Cup for its playing organization, which became known as Total Football, combined with the orange color of its uniform.
- While appearing for Total Nonstop Action Wrestling, Raven created the eponymous Clockwork Orange House of Fun match.
- Professional wrestler Patrick Martin takes the first part of his ring name Alex Shelley from Alex DeLarge.
- The Princeton University men's ultimate frisbee team is named "Clockwork Orange" while their women's team is "Lady Clockwork".

== Video games ==
- The opening cutscene to the Rare Nintendo 64 video game Conker's Bad Fur Day (2001) is a homage to the film.
- An item in The Binding of Isaac: Rebirth is called "The Ludovico Technique" in reference to A Clockwork Orange.
- In Alternativa, opposite the apartment of Professor Oleg Ramidovič Petrenko is a poster reminiscent of the cover to the 1972 edition of the novel but featuring alternative colors.
