= Mikołaj Janusz =

Polish musician

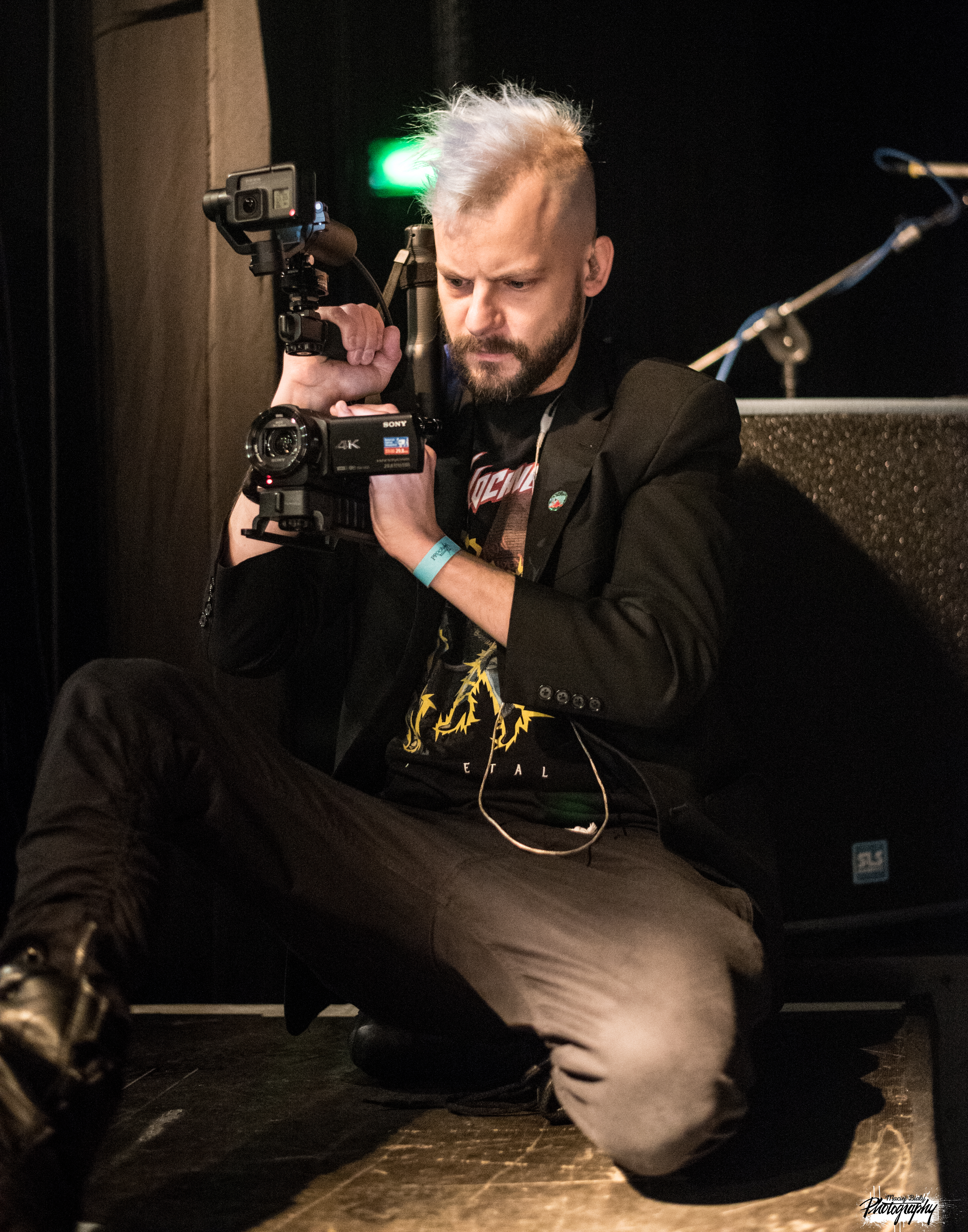
- Mikołaj Janusz (2017)
- Born: Mikołaj Andrzej Janusz; July 20, 1982 (age 42); Warsaw, Poland
- Other names: Jaok
- Occupation(s): journalist, columnist, performer, Internet personality

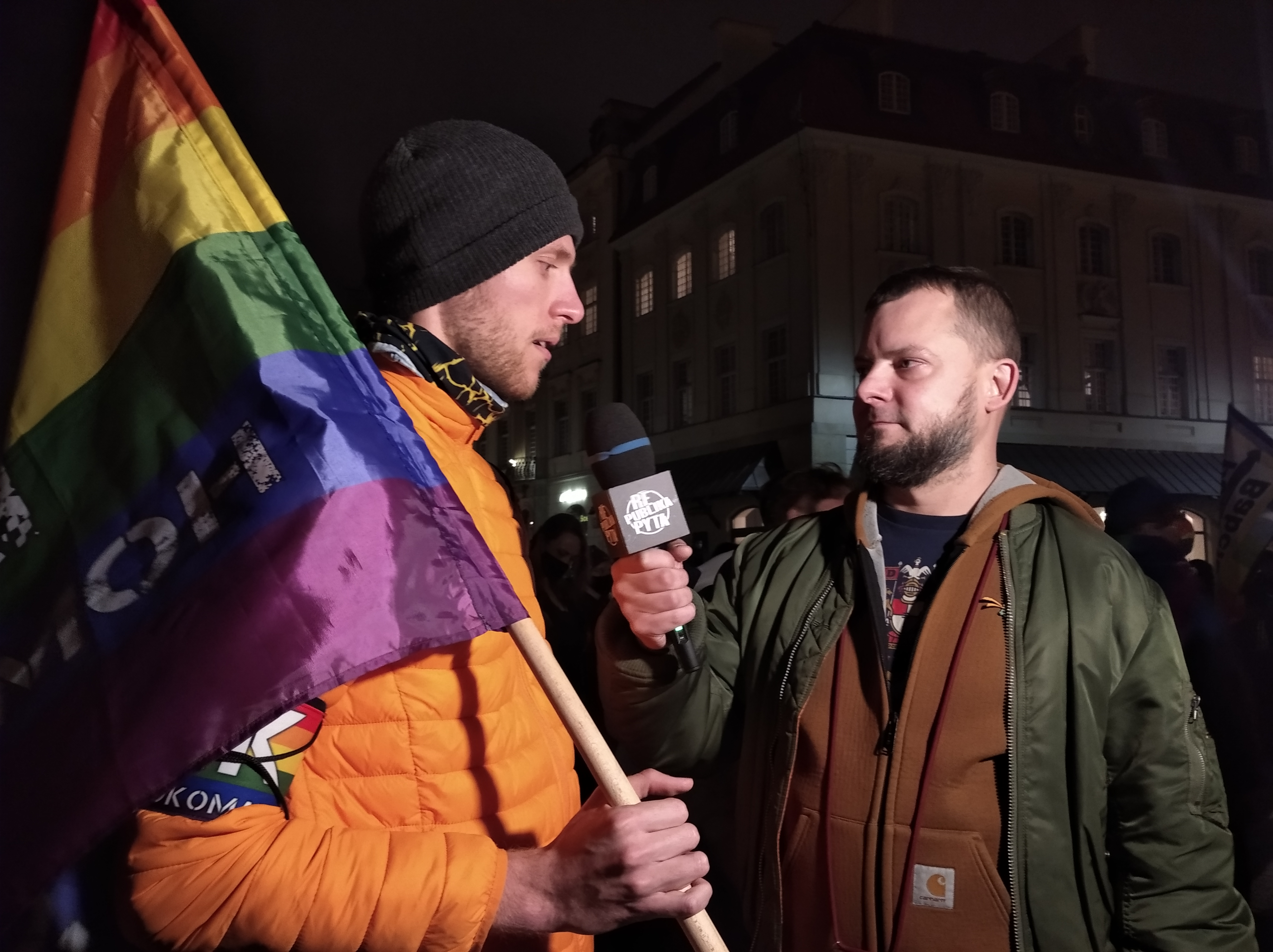
Mikołaj Janusz in 2021.

Mikołaj Andrzej Janusz, also known as Jaok (born July 20, 1982 in Warsaw) – is a Polish journalist, columnist, performer, Internet personality. Co-founder and reporter of Pyta.pl group created in 2005.

== Biography ==
Together with other Pyta.pl members initially he prepared some street surveys for Tele5, conducted weekly program "PTOK" on Radio TOK FM and then they worked with RBL.TV. In 2014-2015 he was weekly leader of the program Pyta Not For Breakfast (Polish: Pyta nie na śniadanie). In addition, with Pyta.pl he recorded videos commenting on the current events under the program Dzięki Bogu już weekend on TVP2.

In the years 2014-2015, Janusz prepared some provocations by phone for the daily program Książę i żebrak (lit. The Prince and the Pauper) on Rock Radio. Then, for several months, he co-hosted the morning show Dobry, zły i brzydki (lit. The Good, the Bad and the Ugly) on Antyradio.

Since 2016 until 2018 he was hosting the talk show Pytowy Janusz on Superstacja.

Since 2018, he was a reporter for the publicist-satirical program W tyle wizji on TVP Info, making satirical coverage from events and conferences. In February 2019, he has been recognized as a provocateur on protests near TVP Info headquarters. TVP initially attributed him as a TVP journalist when reporting on the protesters, but then stated that he was making material for his own internet program, and not representing them. He left TVP in May 2019, after a video of him pulling a protestor's rainbow flag got published.

== Reception ==
In 2007, the weekly Wprost mentioned Janusz with Pyta.pl authors among the five potential stars of the Polish Internet. Radio Medium Publiczne characterized his program as a piece of Polish Internet history and journalism. In 2012, the portal gazeta.pl described Janusz, Kozerski and Grad as the best provocate in Poland, who "likes to bring shame to both those who defend TV Trwam and those who fight for gay's right to adopt a child". In turn, the magazine CKM described them as the authors of "the cult video website".

== Awards ==
- "Niegrzeczni 2015" award for the program "Książę i żebrak"
