= Kury (band) =

Polish musical group

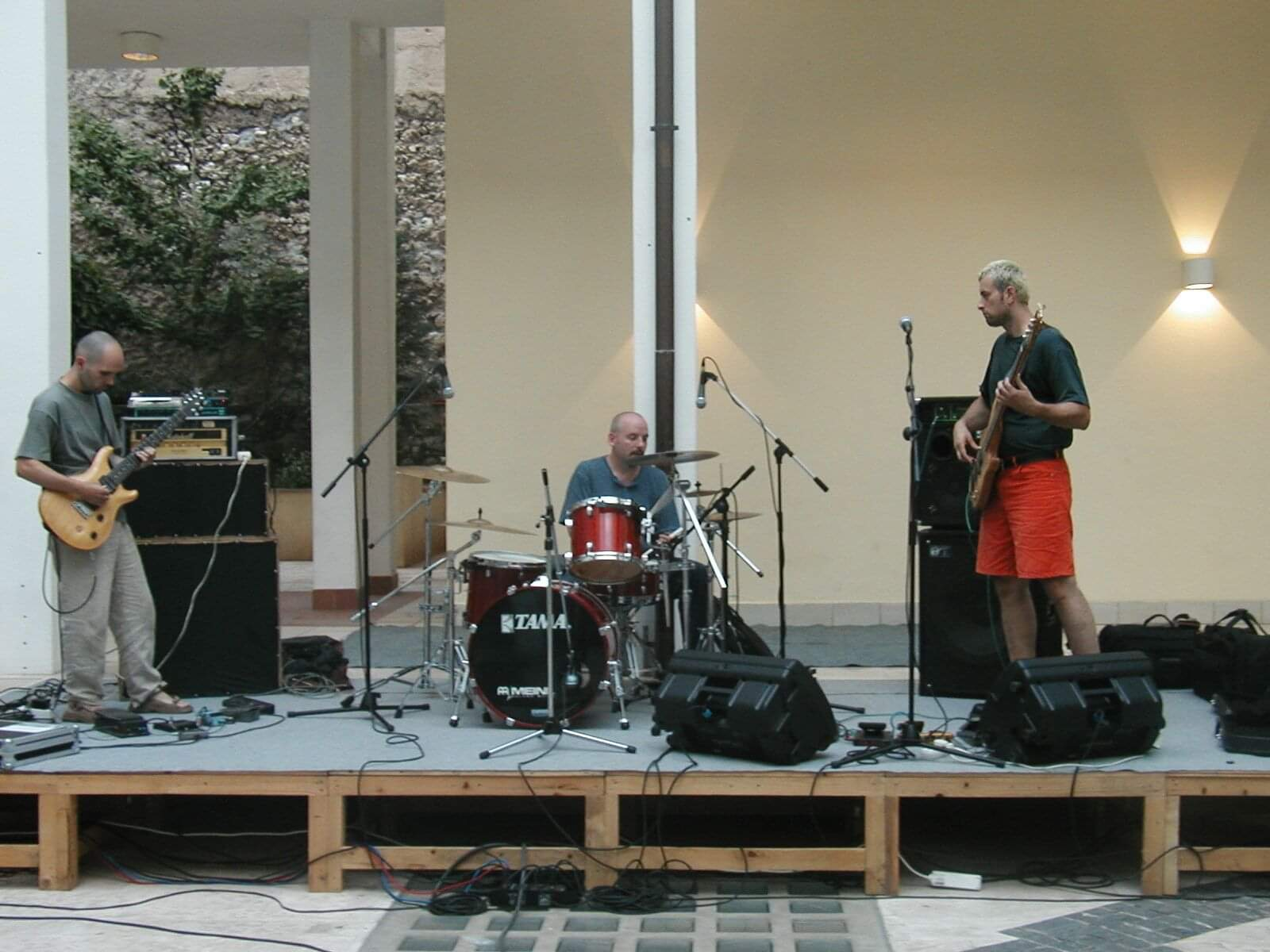
- Kury performing in Mostar in 2002. (from left) Piotr Pawlak, Rory Walsh, Tymon Tymański

Background information
- Origin: Poland
- Genres: Yass
- Years active: 1992–present
- Labels: Biodro Records, Music Corner, S7
- Members: Tymon Tymanski; Olaf Deriglasoff; Szymon Burnos; Alan Kapołka
- Past members: Jacek Olter; Piotr Pawlak; Anna Lasocka; Jerzy Mazzoll; Jacek Stromski; Rory Walsh; Kuba Staruszkiewicz; Jacek Proscinski; Michał Gos

Kury (Polish for "Hens") is a Polish experimental rock and yass group formed in 1992 in Sopot by Ryszard Tymon Tymański, a former member of the experimental art community Totart (1986-1989) and a core member of the Polish yass scene. Kury originally played experimental rock music before their style evolved towards a more electronic direction.

== History ==
Kury's first album "Kablox - nieslyna histaria" was recorded between September and November 1994 in the studio of Polish Radio Szczecin. It contained jazz rock and post rock songs inspired by Frank Zappa, King Crimson, Skeleton Crew and Art Bears. In the following years the band toured Poland, sometimes performing as a quintet with the addition of clarinet player Jerzy Mazzoll, who officially joined after original bassist and vocalist Anna Lasocka left the band in 1995. In the summer of 1996, Tymański got together with his long time friend Olaf Deriglasoff, a Tricity-based singer and songwriter, to cooperate on the production of a new Kury album. The illustrious P.O.L.O.V.I.R.U.S., released in 1998, was a strong compilation of pastiche songs deriding the condition of Polish popular music. The recording sessions lasted throughout the springtime of 1997, with a lot of renowned yass and alternative Tricity luminaries participating. The record was very well reviewed and marked a considerable breakthrough for the band.

After drummer Jacek Olter's suicide in January 2001, the band continued to record and tour, putting out their third record entitled "100 lat undergroundu" (100 Years of the Underground). The album, more oriented towards rap and electronics, contained previously recorded Olter tracks and featured a guest performance from a Sunderland based DJ and musician DJ Scissorkicks aka Anthony Chapman. Without Jacek Olter, Kury strived to survive as a live act, cycling through various drummers including Jacek Stromski (of Apteka), Rory Walsh (of Medicine Jar) and Kuba Staruszkiewicz (of Pink Freud).

The last tour took place in December 2003, after which Tymański disbanded the group. In 2011 and 2012 the band played a couple of concerts and went back into limbo. In autumn of 2023 the Gdynia-based S7 record label reissued remastered P.O.L.O.V.I.R.U.S. on vinyl, CD and cassette which was received with a wave of wide acclaim. Kury once again returned as a touring act, this time announcing its fourth official album to be issued by the end of September 2025. Modern Kury perform as a quintet with Tymon Tymański and Olaf Deriglasoff handling bass, guitars and vocals altogether, Szymon Burnos singing and playing keyboards and Alan Kapolka playing drums.

== Legacy ==
The widely acclaimed P.O.L.O.V.I.R.U.S. won a 1998 Fryderyk in the Alternative Album of the Year category and a Machiner '98. As of now, many critics and fans still regard it as one of the most outstanding Polish music achievements of the colorful 90's era.

== Members ==
- Tymon Tymański - bass guitar, vocals
- Olaf Deriglasoff - bass guitar, guitar, vocals
- Szymon Burnos - keyboards, vocals
- Alan Kapolka - drums

=== Past members ===
- Jacek Olter – drums
- Piotr Pawlak – guitar
- Anna Lasocka - bass, vocals
- Jerzy Mazzoll - clarinets, vocals
- Jacek Stromski - drums
- Rory Walsh - drums
- Kuba Staruszkiewicz - drums
- Jacek Prościński - drums.

== Discography ==
- Kablox-niesłyna histaria (1995)
- P.O.L.O.V.I.R.U.S. (1998)
- Na żywo w Pstrągu (1999) - an unofficial live album
- Napijmy się oleju (EP, 2000)
- 100 lat undergroundu (2001)
- Uno Lovis Party (2025)
