= Białe wakacje =

Studio album by Ścianka
- Released: September 23, 2002
- Genre: Rock
- Length: 59:06
- Label: Sissy Records
- Producer: Ścianka

Ścianka chronology
Dni wiatru (2001)	Białe wakacje (2002)	Pan Planeta (2006)

Białe wakacje is the third studio album of Polish rock group Ścianka released in 2002.

== Track listing ==
1. "Got my shoes and my tattoo part 1" – 2:38
2. "Białe wakacje" – 7:33 (White holiday)
3. "The hill" – 2:14
4. "Harfa traw" – 4:39 (The harp of the grass)
5. "Piosenka nr.2" – 7:02 (Song number 2)
6. "A-6" – 1:33
7. "Miasta i nieba" – 7:37 (Cities and skies)
8. "Peron 4" – 7:15 (Platform 4)
9. "September" – 5:20
10. "Got my shoes and my tattoo part 2" – 12:50

== Personnel ==
- Maciej Cieślak – guitar, vocals
- Arkadiusz Kowalczyk – drums
- Jacek Lachowicz – synthesizers
- Andrzej Koczan – bass guitar
