= 1983–1986 =

1983-1986

Compilation album by Sni Sredstvom Za Uklanianie
- Released: April 2008
- Recorded: 1995
- Genre: New wave
- Label: Biodro Records BRCD 029

1983–1986 is an album of Polish new wave group Sni Sredstvom Za Uklanianie, released in 2008 by Biodro Records. It contains sixteen songs recorded in 1995. Sni Sredstvom Za Uklanianie was split up in 1988 but Tymon Tymański decided to reunite his band for two weeks only to record songs played live between 1983 and 1986. Songs were previously recorded in Gdańsk music studio SAR in 1986, but tapes with this material were irretrievably lost.

== Track listing ==
No.	Title	Length
1.	"Moja lewa ręka"	2:12
2.	"Film"	2:31
3.	"Jutro"
4.	"Labirynt"
5.	"To nie moje sumienie"	2:37
6.	"Inne słońca"	2:39
7.	"Błąd"
8.	"Manekin"	2:36
9.	"Granica"	0:27
10.	"Wrona*"
11.	"Pryzmat"
12.	"Trup w wannie"
13.	"Ostatnie Drzwi"
14.	"Mapa skóry"
15.	"Pierwszy maja"

== Personnel ==
- Tymon Tymański – voice, guitar
- Piotr Merta – guitar
- Bartek Szmit – drums
