= Dni wiatru =

Album by Ścianka

Studio album by Ścianka
- Released: 22 February 2000
- Recorded: November–December 1999
- Genre: Rock/ambient
- Label: Sissy Records
- Producer: Ścianka, Wojtek Wesołowski

Ścianka chronology
Statek kosmiczny Ścianka	Dni wiatru	Białe wakacje

Dni wiatru (Days of Wind) was the second album of Polish group Ścianka, released in 2000. Dni wiatru has received great critical acclaim, being considered one of the best Polish alternative music albums ever. The album was preceded by the EP ...only your bus doesn't stop here.

== Track listing ==
1. "Dni wiatru" – 9:08 (Days of wind)
2. "Latający pies" – 3:07 (Flying dog)
3. "Piotrek" – 11:04 (Peter)
4. "19 XI" – 7:28
5. "Spychacz" – 7:19 (Bulldozer)
6. "The iris sleep under the snow" – 3:44
7. "Czarny autobus" – 11:49 (Black bus)
8. "***" – 11:42
9. "Oceans fall down" – 4:04
  - "Czarne anioły" (multimedia track) – video directed by Wojciech Hoffmann. (Black angels)

== Personnel ==
- Maciej Cieślak – guitar, voice
- Jacek Lachowicz – keyboards
- Andrzej Koczan – bass
- Arkady Kowalczyk – drums
- Wojciech Michałowski – bass (8.)
