= Antyradio =

Radio station in Poland

- Type: Music radio
- Country: Poland
- Headquarters: Żurawia 8, Warszawa, Poland

Programming
- Language(s): Polish

Ownership
- Owner: Eurozet; Agora SA

History
- Founded: June 1, 2005; 20 years ago

Antyradio is a Polish radio network broadcasting all genres of rock music, although mostly broadcasting contemporary rock hits. The current owner of the network is Eurozet.

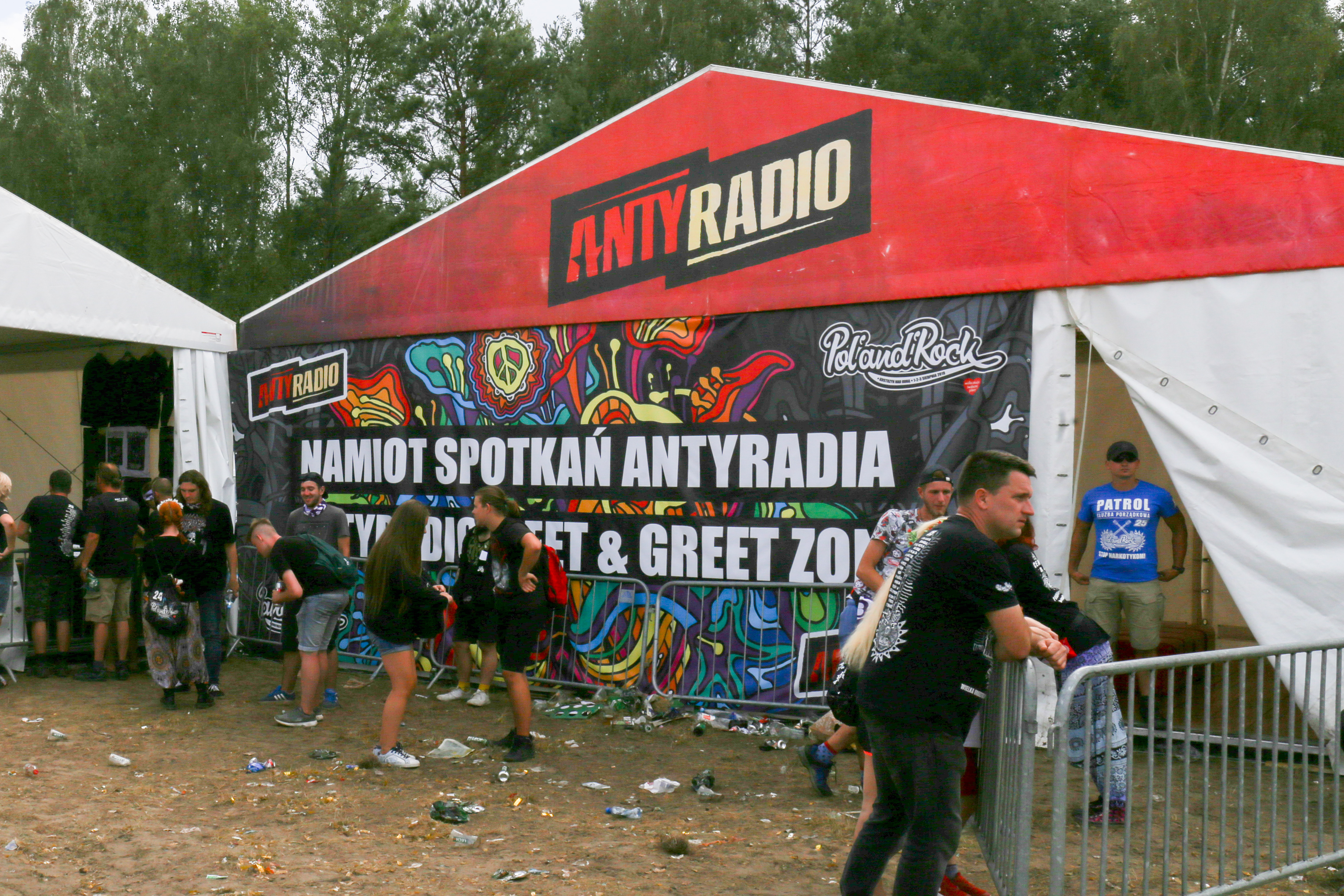
AntyRadio booth at the 2019 Pol’and’Rock festival

Antyradio started broadcasting on 1 June 2005.

Managers:

- Marcin Bąkiewicz - Editor-in-chief, Programme Director, Music Director
- Cezary Skoczeń - Marketing Manager

DJs:

- Tomasz Kasprzyk - „Kasprologia”, "Blok z Wielkiej Płyty"
- Aleksander Ostrowski - „Ostry Dyżur”
- Jerzy Owsiak - „Zaraz Będzie Ciemno”
- Bartek Synowiec - „Rockomotywa”
- Joanna Zientarska - „Odjechani”
- Włodzimierz Zientarski - „Odjechani”
- Piotr "Makak" Szarłacki - „MakakArt”, „Makakofonia”
- Jarosław "Anzelmo" Giers - "Rzeźnia"
- Michał Figurski - „Najgorsze Państwo Świata”
- Karolina Korwin-Piotrowska - „Najgorsze Państwo Świata”
- Małgorzata Wierzejewska - „Najgorsze Państwo Świata”
- Krzysztof Dowgird - "Wieczorne Rozmowy"
- Wiesław Weiss - "Teraz Rock w Antyradiu"
- Jarek Szubrycht - "Wszystko w Sam Raz"
- Leszek Gnoiński - "Rockolekcje"
- Piotr "Frank" Marciniak - "Turbo Top" and sport news
- Grzegorz Kornacki, Joanna Obuchowska, Mieszko Dreszer, Magdalena Poddańczyk, Magdalena Mleczko - „Prawda” (news), „Cała Prawda” (reporters' magazine)
- Pawel Loroch - "Gastrofaza"
- information for drivers - "AntyRadar"
- news about cultural events - „Pełna kultura”

== Frequencies (FM) ==
Town	Frequency (MHz)
Warsaw	106,8
Katowice	106,4
Sosnowiec	89,8
Bielsko-Biała	105,0
Kraków	101,0
Gdańsk	92,0
Gorzów Wielkopolski	98,4
Olsztyn	91,9
Wrocław	106,9
Szczecin	104,9
Gdynia	101,1
Koszalin	106,9
Łódź	89,6
Poznań	101,6
Rzeszów	96,4
Zielona Góra	92,9
