= Pan Planeta =

Studio album by Ścianka
- Released: June 2006
- Recorded: 2005
- Genre: Rock
- Label: Ampersand/Isound
- Producer: Ścianka

Ścianka chronology
| Boję się zasnąć, boję się wrócić do domu | Pan Planeta | Secret Sister |

Pan Planeta, released in 2001, is the fourth album by Polish rock band Ścianka, the last one recorded with Jacek Lachowicz and Andrzej Koczan.

== Recording and production ==
Pan Planeta was recorded in 2005 and 2006, before Andrzej Koczan and Jacek Lachowicz left the band.

== Critical response ==
The album has been met with generally positive reviews from Polish critics. Screenagers.pl included the album in reviewers' list of the top twenty albums of 2006, ranking it at position 5.

== Track listing ==
1. "Boję się zasnąć, boję się wrócić do domu" – 4:44 (I'm afraid of falling asleep, I'm afraid of returning home)
2. "Pęknięcie 1" – 1:53 (Crack 1)
3. "Wielki Defekator" – 5:53 (The Great Defecator)
4. "Zepsuta piosenka" – 2:02 (Broken song)
5. "Ryba-kość" – 1:13 (Fish-bone)
6. "Armia palców u nóg" – 0:51 (Army of toes)
7. "Wichura (Głowa czerwonego byka)" – 9:38 (Gale – red bull's head)
8. "Gotowanie dla każdego: gwiazdy" – 6:48 (Cooking for everyone: stars)
9. "Pan Planeta" – 7:20 (Mr. Planet)

== Personnel ==
- Maciej Cieślak – guitar, voice
- Arkadiusz Kowalczyk – drums
- Jacek Lachowicz – keyboard
- Andrzej Koczan – bass guitar
