= Korova Milky Bar =

2002 album by Myslovitz

Studio album by Myslovitz
- Released: May 27, 2002
- Genre: Alternative Rock
- Length: 59:58
- Label: Sony Music Polska
- Producer: Tomasz Baranowski

Myslovitz chronology
Miłość w czasach popkultury (1999)	Korova Milky Bar (2002)	The Best Of (2003)

Korova Milky Bar (English version)

Studio album by Myslovitz
- Released: July 7, 2003 (EU); December 9, 2003 (PL)
- Genre: Rock
- Length: 63:34
- Label: Capitol / Pomaton EMI
- Producer: Tomasz Baranowski

Myslovitz chronology
The Best Of (2003)	Korova Milky Bar (English version) (2003)	Skalary, mieczyki, neonki (2004)

Korova Milky Bar is the fifth studio album by Polish alternative rock band Myslovitz. It was released in 2002, and followed in 2003 by a release of the English version, which in fact included four songs from the band's previous album, Miłość w czasach popkultury. The title of the album is a reference to the Korova Milk Bar in Stanley Kubrick's classic screen version of A Clockwork Orange.

Strikingly, the melancholic elements took over almost completely, with both music and lyrics creating an almost depressive overall mood. Nonetheless, the album sold even more copies than its predecessor had over the same length of time, with the singles Acidland and Sprzedawcy marzeń repeating the success of Długość dźwięku samotności, Myslovitz's previous best-seller.

The reason for the new material's popularity, as some critics surmised, was that its atmosphere closely conformed to a presumed resignative-recessive mood within Polish society at large – which guitarist Przemek Myszor seemed to confirm in an interview for the Montreal Mirror: "For us, the Korova Milky Bar [from Kubrick's "A Clockwork Orange"] is a place where something different may happen to your mind. It's a place like today’s Poland. You know, Poland is a place where very strange things happen to your mind. It's a country full of crisis and everything around you is very sad, very dark, very fucked. There is an economic crisis here. People don't have money, politics are fucked. The lyrics on our record are sad because of this. We sing a lot about being in a strange state of mind."

In November 2002, Myslovitz signed a new contract with EMI's Polish outlet Pomaton EMI, and released an English-language re-recording of Korova Milky Bar. The album was released in 27 countries, including Germany, the Netherlands, Belgium, Switzerland, France, Spain, Russia, Turkey, and South Africa.

Even before the album's release, The Sound of Solitude was released as a single. A music video for this song was directed by Janusz Kamiński, and received frequent plays on MTV Europe. The English album as a whole received positive reviews in the European music press, particularly in Germany, although radio airplay was sporadic and largely limited to Alternative programmes, such as John Peel in the UK.

On both albums, the last track contains two songs separated by a period of silence.

== Track listing ==
1. "Sprzedawcy Marzeń" (Dream sellers) – 3:55
2. "Acidland" – 4:14
3. "Bar mleczny Korova" (Korova Milk Bar) – 3:04
4. "Wieża melancholii" (The melancholy tower) – 5:13
5. "Za zamkniętymi oczami" (Behind closed eyes) – 3:28
6. "Kilka błędów popełnionych przez dobrych rodziców" (A few mistakes made by good parents) – 3:55
7. "Siódmy koktajl" (Seventh cocktail) – 4:19
8. "Nigdy nie znajdziesz sobie przyjaciół jeśli nie będziesz taki jak wszyscy" (You'll never find friends if you're not like everyone else) – 3:12
9. "W 10 sekund przez całe życie" (Throughout life in 10 seconds) – 5:19
10. "Chciałbym umrzeć z miłości" (I'd like to die of love) – 6:55
11. "Szklany człowiek / Pocztówka z lotniska" (Man of glass / Postcard from an airport) – 4:52 / 5:42

=== Singles ===
- "Acidland" (April 2002)
- "Sprzedawcy marzeń" (September 2002)
- "Chciałbym umrzeć z miłości" (January 2003)

== English version track listing ==
1. "Man of Glass" – 4:52
2. "Dreamsellers" – 3:46
3. "Sound of Solitude" – 4:05 †
4. "Acidland" – 4:07
5. "Townboys" – 3:57 †
6. "Korova Milky Bar" – 3:04
7. "The Melancholy Tower" – 5:13
8. "A Few Mistakes Made By Good Parents" – 3:55
9. "Behind Closed Eyes" – 3:28
10. "For You" – 3:45 †
11. "Throughout Life in 10 Seconds" – 5:19
12. "Us" – 3:26 †
13. "I'd Like to Die of Love / Postcard from an Airport" – 4:58 / 5:42

† indicates English versions of songs originally found on the 1999's Miłość w czasach popkultury.

=== Singles ===
- "Sound of Solitude" (April 2003)
- "Acidland" (January 2004)
- "Behind Closed Eyes" (February 2004)

== Personnel ==
Myslovitz:

- Artur Rojek - lead vocal, guitars
- Przemysław Myszor - guitars, keyboards, lead vocal on "Pocztówka z lotniska"
- Wojciech Powaga - guitars
- Jacek Kuderski - bass guitar, backing vocals
- Wojciech Kuderski - drums

and also:

- Tomasz Bonarowski - producer
