= The Best Of (Myslovitz album) =

Studio album by Myslovitz
- Released: June 9, 2003
- Genre: Rock
- Label: Sony Music Polska

Myslovitz chronology
Korova Milky Bar (2002)	The Best Of (2003)	Korova Milky Bar (English Version) (2003)

Myslovitz - The Best Of is a greatest hits album by Polish alternative rock group Myslovitz released in 2003.

== Track listing ==
Side 1

1. "Scenariusz dla moich sąsiadów" - 3:12
2. "Sprzedawcy marzeń" - 3:47
3. "Kraków - Grechuta" - 3:28
4. "Krótka piosenka o miłości" - 3:35
5. "Z twarzą Marilyn Monroe" - 2:46
6. "Książka z drogą w tytule" - 4:31
7. "Maj" - 6:27
8. "Blue Velvet" - 2:50
9. "Margaret" - 4:05
10. "Acidland" - 4:08
11. "To nie był film" - 3:34
12. "Chłopcy" - 3:58
13. "Good Day My Angel" - 6:58
14. "Myslovitz (A Capella)" - 0:47

Side 2

1. "Myslovitz" - 3:57
2. "Długość dźwięku samotności" - 4:10
3. "Zwykły dzień" - 3:12
4. "Kraków (Original)" - 04:09
5. "Historia jednej znajomości" - 6:48
6. "Polowanie na wielbłąda" - 5:12
7. "Dla Ciebie" - 3:46
8. "Sekrety i kłamstwa" - 4:19
9. "Peggy Brown" - 3:32
10. "Zgon" - 2:32
11. "My" - 3:26
12. "The Iris Sleeps Under the Snow" - 6:52
13. "Sei Taing Kya" - 5:41
