= Skalary, mieczyki, neonki =

Studio album by Myslovitz
- Released: December 4, 2004
- Recorded: 2002
- Genre: Progressive rock, post-rock
- Length: 69:30
- Label: Capitol / Pomaton EMI

Myslovitz chronology
Korova Milky Bar (English version) (2003)	Skalary, mieczyki, neonki (2004)	Happiness Is Easy (2006)

Skalary, mieczyki, neonki (English: Angelfish, swordtails, neon tetras) is the seventh studio album by Polish alternative rock band Myslovitz. It was released out-of-schedule on December 4, 2004. The album is startlingly different from Myslovitz's other albums, abandoning the usual alt-rock sound in favour of psychedelic soundscapes and improvisations.

The album contains outtakes from the Korova Milky Bar recording sessions. The songs are longish, psychedelic-experimental and mostly instrumental soundscapes with an utterly melancholic mood to them. Although this is the only studio album with this sound, Myslovitz have been known to improvise in this style between songs on their live concerts.

The first and only single from the album, Życie to surfing, was released in November 2004.

== Track listing ==
1. "Skalary, mieczyki, neonki cz.1 " (Angelfish, swordtails, neon tetras - part 1) – 1:03
2. "Theme from Road Movie" – 6:06
3. "Man on the Machine" – 7:38
4. "Życie to surfing" (Life is a surfing) – 7:13
5. "Isn't Anything" – 0:35
6. "Beastie Fish" – 4:38
7. "W sieci" (In the web) – 9:36
8. "Skalary, mieczyki, neonki cz.2" – (Angelfish, swordtails, neon tetras - part 2) 1:02
9. "Nr 9" (Number 9) – 6:04
10. "Czerwony notes błękitny prochowiec" (Red notebook, blue dust-coat) – 5:54
11. "Death of the Cocaine Dancer" – 7:37
12. "Sean Penn Song" – 6:35
13. "Skalary, mieczyki, neonki cz.3" (Angelfish, swordtails, neon tetras - part 3) – 2:08
14. "Marie Minn Restaurant" – 3:11

=== Singles ===
- "Życie to surfing" (2004)
