= Talkin' About Life and Death =

Studio album by Miłość
- Released: 1999
- Genre: Yass
- Label: Biodro Records

Miłość chronology
Muzyka do filmu Sztos	Talkin' About Life and Death	Nobody's White

Talkin' About Life and Death is an album by Polish jazz band, Miłość, and American jazz musician, Lester Bowie. The songs were recorded in two days in July 1997 in Gdańsk.

The album includes a variety of songs such as "Venus in Furs" by Lou Reed and a song by Charles Ives.

== Track listing ==
1. "Venus in Furs" (Reed)
2. "A Tribute To Drukpa Kunley" (Tymański)
3. "Maple Leaves" (Ives)
4. "Duet" (Tymański)
5. "What If" (Bowie)
6. "Fukan Zazen-gi" (Tymański)
7. "Facing the Wall" (Tymański)
8. "Let's Get Serious" (Tymański)
9. "The Bardo of Life" (Tymański)
10. "Impressions" (Coltrane)

== Personnel ==
- Lester Bowie – trumpet
- Mikołaj Trzaska – alto & soprano saxophones
- Leszek Możdżer – grand piano
- Tymon Tymański – double bass, voice, leader
- Jacek Olter – drums
