= Miłość w czasach popkultury =

Studio album by Myslovitz
- Released: 25 October 1999
- Genre: Alternative rock, post-Britpop
- Length: 51:38
- Label: Columbia, Polska
- Producer: Andrzej Wojciechowski

Myslovitz chronology
Z rozmyślań przy śniadaniu (1997)	Miłość w czasach popkultury (1999)	Korova Milky Bar (Polish Version) (2002)

Miłość w czasach popkultury (Love in the Time of Pop Culture) is the fourth album by Polish alternative rock band Myslovitz. The album helped to establish the band's position as the most popular rock band in Poland.

== Track listing ==
All songs written by Artur Rojek, Wojtek Kuderski, Jacek Kuderski, Wojtek Powaga and Przemek Myszor

1. "Chłopcy" (Boys) – 3:58
2. "Nienawiść" (Hatred)– 3:50
3. "Długość dźwięku samotności" (The Length of the Sound of Solitude) – 4:12
4. "Dla Ciebie" (For You) – 3:47
5. "Peggy Sue nie wyszła za mąż" (Peggy Sue didn't get married) – 4:27
6. "Gdzieś" (Somewhere) – 4:33
7. "Kraków" (Cracow) – 4:10
8. "Miłość w czasach popkultury" (Love in Times of Popular Culture) – 3:16
9. "Noc" (Night) – 5:51
10. "Alexander" – 4:01
11. "My" (Us)– 3:28
12. "Zamiana" (Exchange) – 6:26

== Personnel ==
- Artur Rojek – vocals, guitar
- Wojtek Kuderski – drums
- Jacek Kuderski - bass guitar
- Wojtek Powaga - guitar
- Przemek Myszor - guitar, keyboard
