= Biodro Records =

Record label

- Founded: 1999
- Founder: Tymon Tymański, Andrzej Maroszek, Dariusz Dikti
- Genre: Various
- Country of origin: Poland
- Location: Tricity
- Official website: https://web.archive.org/web/20080224034107/http://www.biodro.pl:80/

Biodro Records is a Polish record label founded in 1998 by Tymon Tymański, Andrzej Maroszek and Dariusz Dikti.

Its first releases, P.O.L.O.V.I.R.U.S. by Tymon Tymański's Kury and Statek kosmiczny Ścianka by Ścianka were big artistic and commercial success on polish alternative music market, winning together seven nominations for Fryderyk Award (six for Kury and one for Ścianka) and one award. However, in 2001 Biodro's publishing activity was suspended due to financial problems and recession in the Polish phonographic industry. Five years later Biodro was reactivated, and issued some new records. Re-editions of classic, long unavailable albums were announced.
