= Secret Sister =

Type of social media scam

Secret Sister is a chain letter-type gift exchange pyramid scheme that has been primarily spread through Facebook. It was first noticed in late 2015, and returned in the Christmas season each year after that.

In a typical post, participants are given a list of six names and are asked to send one gift (or book, or bottle of wine) valued at about $10–15 USD to the person at the top of the list. They are then asked to remove the person in the top spot, move the person in the number two spot to the top, add themselves to the number two spot, and invite six friends. If those six friends all send gifts to the person at the top of the list and recruit six additional people, the original participant will receive a total of 36 gifts.

Unlike a typical Secret Santa exchange, where participants only give and receive one gift, Secret Sister participants are unlikely to receive the promised gifts. This is because an exponentially growing pyramid of gift givers and recipients cannot be sustained indefinitely. As it gets harder to recruit new participants, the scheme will fall apart. According to Snopes.com, while a handful of people claim to have received a single gift when participating in a Secret Sister exchange, there is no evidence that anyone has received a substantial number of gifts via this scheme.

== See also ==
- List of internet phenomena
- Pyramid scheme
- Make Money Fast
