= Planeta (surname) =

Planeta is a surname. Notable people with the surname include:

- Emil Planeta (1909–1963), American baseball pitcher
- Szimonetta Planéta (born 1993), Hungarian handball player
