= Miłość =

- Miłość, from left: Mikołaj Trzaska, Jacek Olter, Leszek Możdżer, Maciej Sikała, Tymon Tymański

Background information
- Origin: Poland
- Genres: Yass
- Years active: 1988–2002
- Labels: Gowi Records, Biodro Records

Miłość (English: "Love") was a Polish Yass music band. The band was founded in 1988 by Ryszard Tymon Tymański, double bassist and guitarist, former leader of new wave group Sni Sredstvom Za Uklanianie. Miłość played free jazz with avantgarde influences and gave birth to, among others, the Tricity and Bydgoszcz jazz bands, and to a style called yass. Miłość recorded two albums with the legendary jazzman Lester Bowie: "Not Two" (1995) and "Talkin' About Life and Death" (1999). The band split up after Olter's death in 2002.

== Members ==
- Ryszard "Tymon" Tymański – double bass, voice
- Jerzy "Mazzoll" Mazolewski – clarinet (until 1991)
- Mikołaj Trzaska – saxophones
- Leszek Możdżer – piano (since 1991)
- Jacek Olter – drums
- Maciej Sikała – saxophones

== Discography ==
- Miłość (1992)
- Taniec smoka (1994)
- Not Two (with Lester Bowie, 1995)
- Asthmatic (1996)
- Muzyka do filmu Sztos (with Tymon i Trupy, 1997)
- Talkin' About Life And Death (with Lester Bowie, 1999)
- 1983–1986 (2008)
- Nobody's White (planned)
