= Wiesław Weiss =

Polish journalist and writer (born 1956)

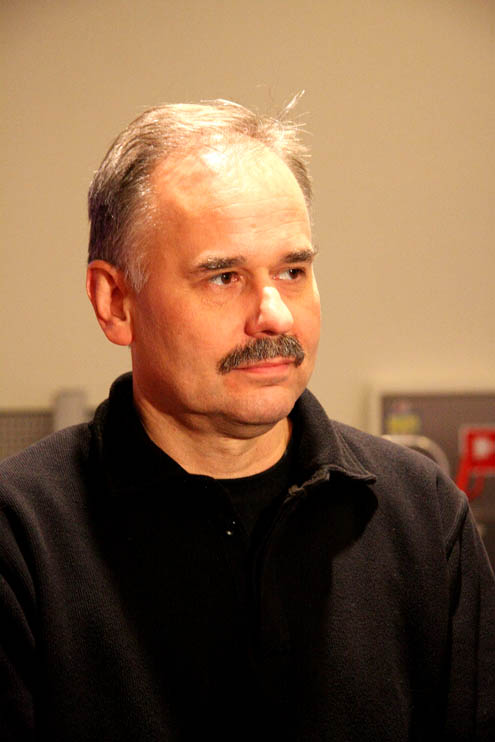
- Weiss in 2009
- Born: 1956 (age 69–70); Poland
- Occupations: Journalist; writer

Wiesław Weiss (born 1956) is a Polish journalist and writer interested in rock music and film.

== Career ==
Weiss' first rock music article was for Jazz magazine (the magazine subsequently changed its name to Magazyn Muzyczny) and he has written for many other magazines over the years, including Film magazine and Playboy. He has also worked in radio, concentrating on rock music. In 1991, he and his friends created a monthly magazine called Tylko Rock (Just Rock), which changed its name to Teraz Rock (Now Rock) in 2003; Weiss has been editor-in-chief throughout this time.

In 1991 Weiss completed his first Rock Encyclopaedia, which was published by Iskry and sold more than 100,000 copies. He has published a book about Pink Floyd: About Cows, Pigs, Bugs and all the Music by Pink Floyd. He has also published a book about Roger Waters: War Games–About all the Music of Roger Waters.

He has conducted innumerable interviews with rock stars, and the material from some of these was collected in the book The Art of Rebellion: Conversations with the Saints and Sinners of Rock Music.

The Great Rock Encyclopaedia, the first two parts of which have been published (part 2 in 2007), is the single largest and most comprehensive encyclopaedia of rock music ever published.

In 2009, his book Kult. Biała księga was released.
