= Ścianka =

Polish rock band

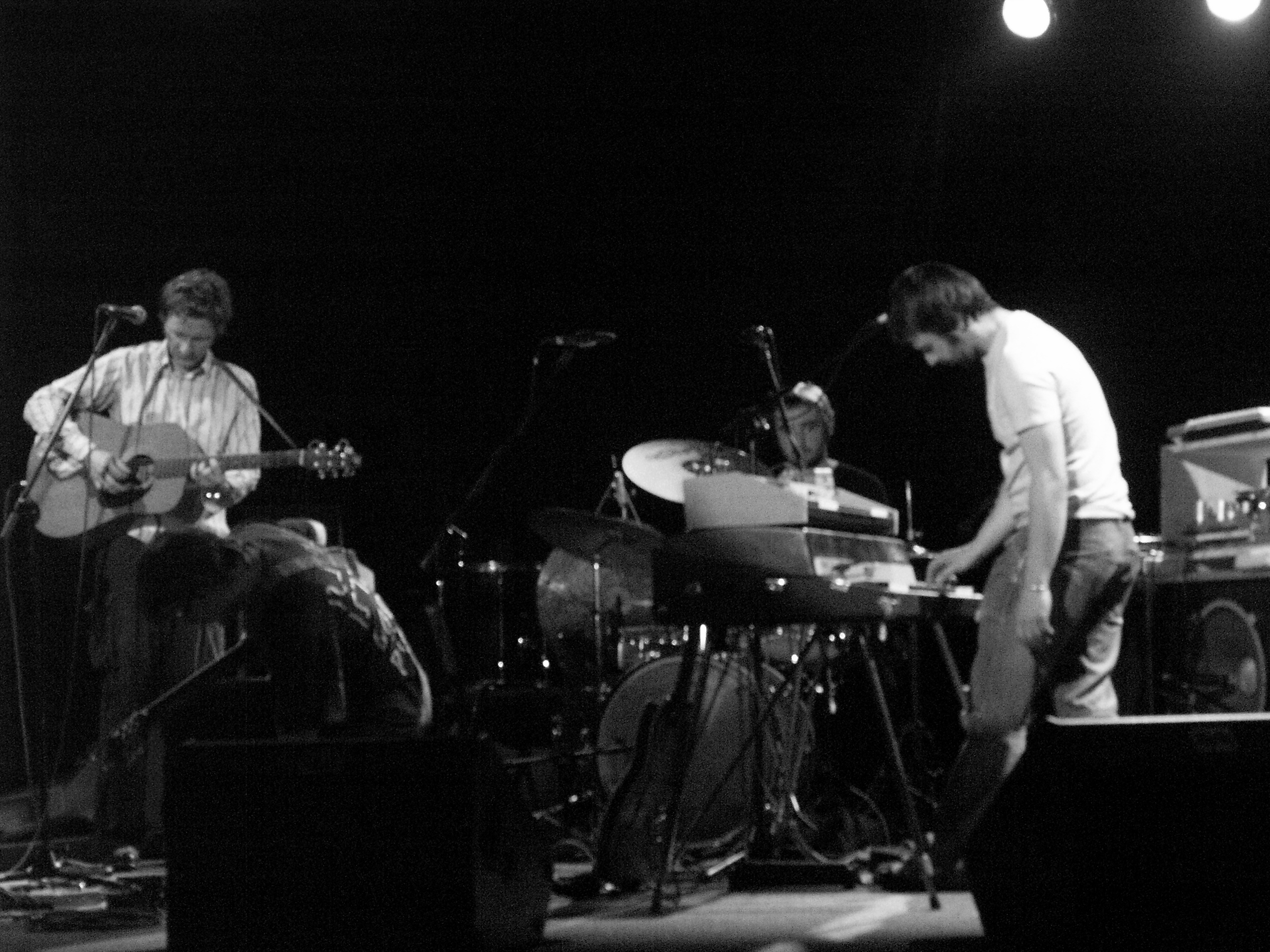

Background information
- Origin: Sopot
- Genres: Experimental rock, psychedelic rock, alternative rock, noise rock, indie rock, post-rock
- Years active: 1994–present
- Labels: Biodro Records, Sissy Records, Isound
- Members: Maciej Cieślak, Michał Biela, Arkady Kowalczyk
- Website: www.scianka.com/

Ścianka is a Polish rock band formed in 1994 in Sopot by guitarist Maciej Cieślak. In 1998 Ścianka were signed by independent label Biodro Records and recorded their debut album entitled Statek kosmiczny Ścianka (Ścianka the Spaceship). After its release, the group received critical and audience acclaim. Their next full-length album, Dni wiatru, moved away from the garage-rock sound of their debut album.

== Members ==
- Maciej Cieślak (guitar, voice)
- Arkadiusz Kowalczyk (drums)
- Wojciech Michałowski (1994 to 1997, bass guitar)
- Jacek Lachowicz (1996 to 2005, synthesizers)
- Tran Chi (1997 to 1998, bass guitar)
- Andrzej Koczan (1998 to 2005, bass guitar)
- Michał Biela (since 2005, bass guitar, glockenspiel, tambourine)

== Discography ==
- 1995-1997 Robaki (demo tape)
- 1998 Statek kosmiczny Ścianka Biodro Records BRCD 002
- 1999 …only your bus doesn't stop here EP Sissy Records
- 2001 Dni wiatru Sissy Records
- 2001 Sława EP Sissy Records
- 2002 Białe wakacje EP Sissy Records/BMG SI029CDS/74321954622
- 2002 Białe wakacje Sissy Records/BMG SI030/74321954612
- 2003 Harfa traw EP Sissy Records/BMG SI037 CDS/82876520362
- 2006 Boję się zasnąć, boję się wrócić do domu EP Ampersand/Isound
- 2006 Pan Planeta Ampersand/Isound
- 2007 Secret Sister EP My Shit In Your Coffee
