= Yass (music) =

Polish style of avant-garde jazz

Yass (jass) is a Polish music style of avant-garde jazz which originated in the late 1980s, that mixes jazz, improvised music, punk rock, and folk. The style began with avant-garde jazz musicians from the Tricity and Bydgoszcz, where the jazz club Mózg became the unofficial 'home venue' for Yass performers, with its own label releasing a number of Yass productions.

The term Yass was coined by bassist and guitarist Tymon Tymański, clarinetist Mazzoll and guitarist Tomasz Gwinciński, who wanted to stress the novelty of the new style. The first Yass album is generally regarded to be Tańce bydgoskie by Trytony.

Though it frequently crosses genres, Yass music can be broadly described as a frequently arrhythmic and highly improvised style of jazz. The most seminal period for Yass was in the 1990s, with many active groups performing and releasing albums, including Miłość, Łoskot, Trytony, and Mazzoll & Arhythmic Perfection. A good overview of the Yass scene exists on the compilation album Cały ten Yass! released by Jazz Forum magazine shortly after the genre's heyday.
