= Tylko Rock =

Tylko Rock (Polish pronunciation: [ˈtɘl.kɔ ˈrɔk], Only Rock) was a monthly hobby magazine published in Poland from 1991 until 2003. Focusing exclusively on rock music, Tylko Rock was founded in September 1991, by Wiesław Królikowski and Wiesław Weiss. A total of 134 issues were published over the next dozen years. Some of Poland's leading musicians and music journalists contributed articles during the publication's run. In 2003, Tylko Rock was relaunched as Teraz Rock (Now Rock), with the magazine expanding its coverage to other genres of music when appropriate.
