= Myslovitz =

Polish rock band

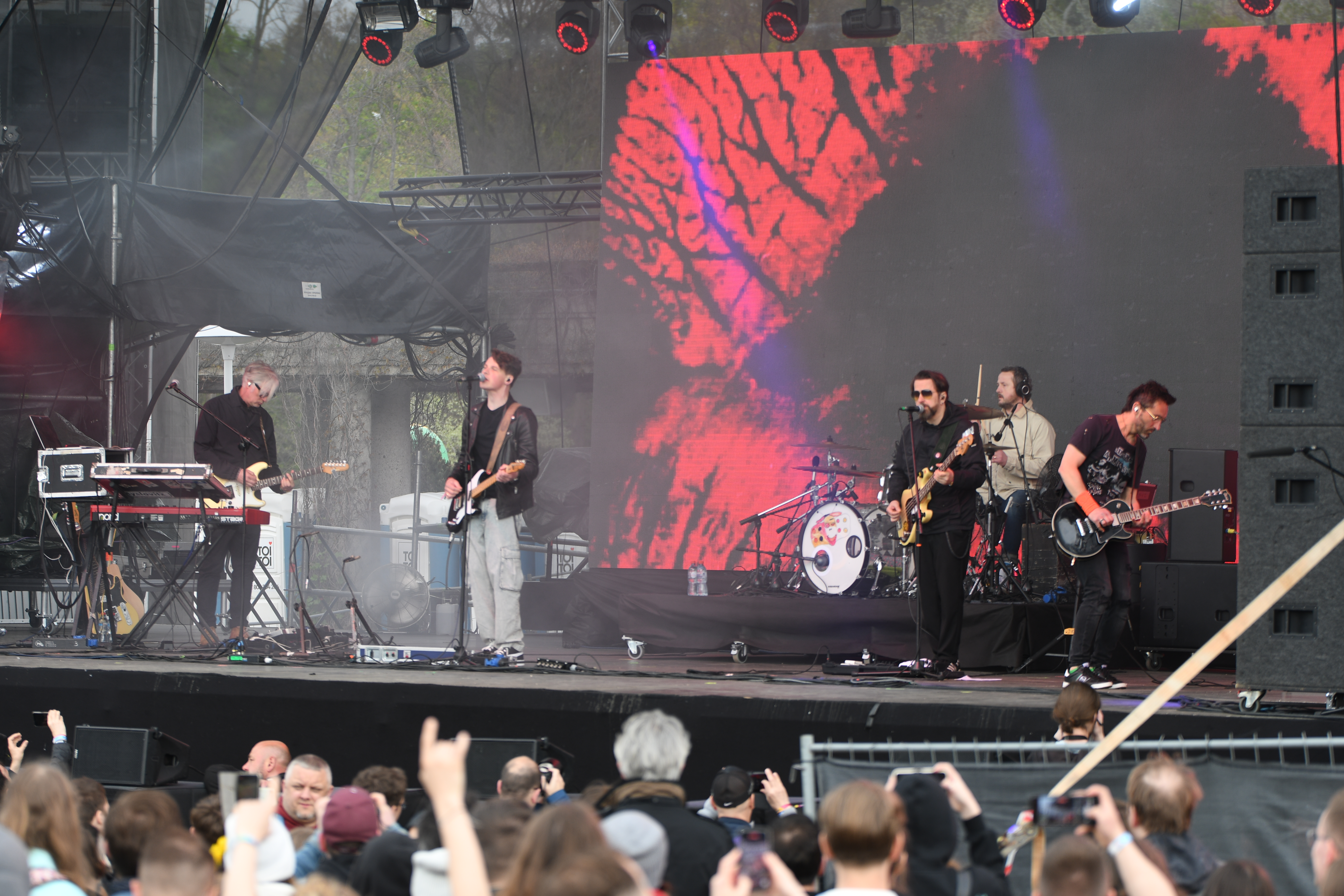
- Myslovitz in Wrocław, 2023

Background information
- Origin: Mysłowice, Poland
- Genres: Alternative rock
- Years active: 1992–present
- Labels: MJM Music PL, Columbia Records, Sony Music Entertainment Poland, Sony BMG Music Entertainment Poland, Pomaton EMI, EMI Music Poland
- Members: Mateusz Parzymięso; Wojciech Powaga; Przemysław Myszor; Jacek Kuderski; Wojciech Kuderski
- Past members: Marcin "Bango" Porczek; Rafał Cieślik; Artur Rojek; Michał Kowalonek

Myslovitz is a Polish rock band. The band take their name from their industrial hometown of Mysłowice in the Upper Silesia region of southern Poland.

== Band history ==
Guitarist and vocalist Artur Rojek started the band in 1992 as "The Freshmen", taking the initial name from the 1990 film The Freshman, starring Marlon Brando and Matthew Broderick, indicating a fascination with cinema that would become a characteristic feature throughout the band's career. In 1994 they changed their name to Myslovitz. The band's early phase was characterised by a somewhat debonair punk attitude, as Rojek admits:

"I started Myslovitz in 1992. I was twenty then and I had no idea how to make good music. Surely, I was a big fan of a few British groups (Ride, Stone Roses, My Bloody Valentine, Housemartins) but I couldn't play the guitar at all. After several months of rehearsals [...] I decided that I should cover the holes in my musical education by [...] chaos (the bigger the better)."

Even so, they soon caught the media's attention, winning several important competitions for young musicians. This enabled them to make their first professional recordings in the studio of Radio Lodz. In 1994, Myslovitz were signed by MJM Music Pl and recorded their self-titled debut album with British producer Ian Harris, who had previously worked for, amongst others, Joy Division, New Order, and The Exploited. Upon its release in 1995, the album received euphoric reviews and was declared "Debut of the Year" by several music magazines. Some critics compared it to Oasis, who were at the peak of their popularity at that time.

In 1996, Myslovitz were joined by a third guitarist and keyboarder, Przemek Myszor, and released the second album Sun Machine on Sony Music Polska. The album spawned two somewhat beatlesque airplay hits - Z twarzą Marilyn Monroe ("With a Face Like...") and Peggy Brown, the latter being a cover version of a fellow Mysłowice rock band, with lyrics originally by the Irish "national bard" Turlough O'Carolan (in a translation by the Polish lyricist and translator Ernest Bryll).

The following year, the third album Z rozmyślań przy śniadaniu ("From meditations over breakfast") was released, displaying a tendency towards a more "polished" sound and more introspective lyrics. Also, Myslovitz's now typical fascination with cinema began to take centre stage with numerous allusions and hints in the lyrics and track titles, and a certain "cinematic" atmosphere in the music itself.

The band's interest in cinema also showed in their contributions to soundtracks. In 1998, they recorded the unconventional track To nie był film ("That was no film") for the Polish movie Młode wilki ½ ("Young Wolves ½"). The lyrics referred to a wave of violent crimes committed by juvenile delinquents, which was controversially discussed in Polish mass media in the mid-1990s. The explicit depiction of violence in the lyrics and the accompanying video clip (which later won a Fryderyk award as "Video of the Year") caused further controversy and led Polish broadcasting networks to boycott both the song and the clip.

Also in 1998, Myslovitz had their first appearances abroad with shows in Sweden, Germany, and the United States.

The final breakthrough for the band came in 1999 with their fourth album entitled Miłość w czasach popkultury ("Love in The Time of Pop Culture"), which went platinum (i.e. 150,000 copies sold) soon and has by now achieved "double platinum" status in Poland. The single Długość dzwięku samotności ("[The Length of the] Sound of Solitude") became the biggest hit for the band so far.

In 2000 Myslovitz again contributed to soundtracks, writing and recording the song Polowanie na wielbłąda ("Camel Hunting") for the movie The Big Animal (Duże zwierzę) by the legendary Polish actor and director Jerzy Stuhr, and the single plus another two (previously unreleased) tracks to director Waldemar Szarek's movie "That's Us" (To my). In 2003 Myslovitz continued their cooperation with Stuhr, creating not only the title song for his movie "Tomorrow's Weather", but also appearing in walk-on roles - as neophyte monks.

In 2002, the follow-up to Miłość..., entitled Korova Milky Bar appeared; the title being an allusion to Stanley Kubrick's classic screen version of Anthony Burgess's A Clockwork Orange. Strikingly, the melancholic elements took over almost completely, with both music and (sometimes sarcastic) lyrics creating an overall downcast mood. Nonetheless, the album sold even more copies than its predecessor had in the same amount of time, with the singles Acidland and Sprzedawcy marzeń ("Dreamsellers") repeating the success of Długość... three years earlier.

The reason for the new material's popularity, as some critics surmised, was that its atmosphere closely conformed to a presumed resignative-recessive mood within Polish society at large - which guitarist Przemek Myszor seemed to confirm in an interview for the Montreal Mirror: "For us, the Korova Milky Bar [from Kubrick's 'A Clockwork Orange'] is a place where something different may happen to your mind. It's a place like today's Poland. You know, Poland is a place where very strange things happen to your mind. It's a country full of crisis and everything around you is very sad, very dark, very fucked. There is an economic crisis here. People don't have money, politics are fucked. The lyrics on our record are sad because of this. We sing a lot about being in a strange state of mind" .

With Korova Milky Bar, Myslovitz appeared at several festivals throughout Europe, including the big, traditional German festival for Alternative acts (Bizarre) and the Montreux Jazz Festival. Also, they supported Iggy Pop and the Simple Minds on their European tours that year. Also, they received an MTV Europe Music Awards in Barcelona for Best Polish Act, having been nominated twice in previous years.

In November 2002 Myslovitz signed a new contract with EMI's Polish outlet Pomaton. The first album to be released on the new label was an English-language re-recording of Korova Milky Bar, which was released in 27 countries (including Germany, the Netherlands, Belgium, Switzerland, France, Spain, Russia, Turkey and South Africa). In addition to the Korova... material, this version also included English versions of older tracks. "Długość dzwięku samotności" now became a single as "The Sound of Solitude"' (an earlier English version, somewhat awkwardly but more correctly entitled "The Length of The Solitude Sound", had been a Polish b-side). A video clip for this song was directed Janusz Kamiński, the Polish Hollywood cinematographer who had won Academy Awards for Best Cinematography with Schindler's List and Saving Private Ryan, and had declined an offer from Martin Scorsese in order to work with Myslovitz. Kaminski declares himself a "fan" of Myslovitz, saying "I only work for Spielberg and Myslovitz [...] Money is not a factor in this. What one doesn't do for one's idols!" The clip got frequent plays on MTV Europe and the album received positive reviews in the European music press, particularly in Germany. However, radio airplay was sporadic and largely limited to Alternative programmes (such as John Peel in the UK), as a consequence, Myslovitz so far failed to enter the upper reaches of the charts outside Poland.

Also in 2003, Myslovitz performed with Travis and Skin (of Skunk Anansie fame) on The Road to Edinburgh, where they received another MTV Europe Music Award for Best Polish Act.

The same year, Sony Music domestically released an obligatory end-of-contract compilation album, entitled The Best of. The lead single Kraków was an older song re-recorded with 1970s Polish folk rock stars Marek Grechuta and Anawa.

In the summer of 2004 Myslovitz were touring Europe again, starting with a concert for the German public radio and television broadcaster WDR on the eve of EU enlargement. Apart from headlining smaller venues and playing festival slots (including the largest Swiss open-air event in St. Gallen, they again opened for Iggy Pop & The Stooges on their European dates, as well as for The Corrs in the UK and mainland Europe.

In December 2004, EMI released Myslovitz's most recent album entitled Skalary, mieczyki, neonki ("Angelfish, swordtails, neon tetras") - an out-of-schedule release with outtakes from the Korova Milky Bar recording sessions; longform, psychedelic-experimental and downbeat instrumental soundscapes took center stage. Skalary... earned Myslovitz comparisons to Radiohead and Pink Floyd.

At the time, the band had finished recording of their new album Happiness Is Easy; it was released in May 2006.

Myslovitz's success arguably contributed to a revitalisation of the Polish alternative rock scene in the late 1990s and early 2000s, which spawned bands such as eM, Kombajn do zbierania kur po wioskach, and Lili Marlene.

In April 2012, frontman and co-founder Artur Rojek left the band after twenty years to pursue a solo career and continue work as creative director for the annual OFF Festival. Rojek was replaced by singer Michał Kowalonek, who left the band in 2018 (exactly six years to the day of Rojek's departure).

== Band members ==
Current members

- Mateusz Parzymięso – lead vocals, guitar (2019–present)
- Wojciech (Wojtek) Powaga – guitar (1992–present)
- Przemysław (Przemek) Myszor – guitar, keyboards (1996–present)
- Jacek Kuderski – bass guitar, backing vocals (1992–present)
- Wojciech (Wojtek, "Lala") Kuderski – drums, percussion (1992–present)

Former members

- Marcin "Bongo" Porczek – drums (1992)
- Rafał Cieślik – bass guitar (1992)
- Artur Rojek – lead vocals, guitar (1992–2012)
- Tomasz Majorek - keyboards (1992)
- Michał Kowalonek – lead vocals, guitar (2012–2018)

Former touring members

- Łukasz Lańczyk – lead vocals, guitar (2018–2019)

== Myslovitz and Mysłowice ==
Myslovitz follow the tradition of 1970s American rock acts who took their names from their places of origin, such as Chicago or Boston. When choosing their name, the band seemed to be inspired by an ambiguous relationship towards their hometown which they felt to be rather provincial. In a review of The Best of..., the liberal Catholic weekly Tygodnik Powszechny stated that "coming from Mysłowice, the band entered the new, wonderful world of show business with a small-town complex". In an interview with the Montreal Mirror (see above), Guitarist Przemek Myszor called Mysłowice "depressing" [...] like all small towns are. In Poland there are few big towns. And by big town I mean where there is culture. You know, towns that have big clubs. We still live in Mysłowice, but this is a city to die in, not to live. Our region of Poland, in the south, is very industrial, coal mining, hard industry" . For statements like these, Myslovitz were sometimes chided for fouling their own nest; paradoxically, however, they even helped to sanitize the city's image. Says the music journalist Leszek Gnoiński (author of the "standard work" Encyklopedia Polskiego Rocka): "Mysłowice is a city of some 100,000 people. Until the early 90s, it was known, at best, for its coalmines - until these five guys with guitars turned the mining town into a place that could be located on any map of Poland." Myslovitz's impact was one factor which stimulated the development of a local music scene. By now, with bands such as Negatyw and Supermusic, a lively Alternative rock and hip hop culture is flourishing in Mysłowice. Far away from Warsaw as the centre of the commercial Polish entertainment industry, it even benefits from its image as being peripheral, obscure, and non-commercial - not totally unlike the British Madchester phenomenon in the 1980s and early 1990s.

== Awards ==
- Apart from numerous accolades awarded by Polish music magazines and radio stations, Myslovitz received the weekly Polityka's Paszport in the category "Pop/Rock/Entertainment" in 1999; in 2000 the Polish Playboy declared Długość Dzwięku Samotności and Myslovitz "Song of The Year" and "Band of The Year" respectively, whereas the Polish issue of Elle declared them the "most stylish stars in music".
- Myslovitz were frequently nominated for Fryderyks (the Polish equivalent of the BRIT Award or the Grammy) in various categories. In total, they received seven Fryderyk awards - in 1998 for "Music Video of The Year" (for To nie był film/"It wasn't a movie" - see above), in 1999 for "Band of The Year" and "Rock Album of The Year" (for Długość Dzwięku Samotności/"Length of the sound of solitude"), in 2000 for "Song of The Year" (for Chłopcy/"(Town) Boys") and "Video of The Year" (for Dla Ciebie/"For You"), and in 2003 for "Album of The Year (for Korova Milky Bar).
- After two nominations in previous years, Myslovitz were declared Best Polish Act at the MTV Europe Music Awards in 2002 and again in 2003.
- On January 23, 2005, as part of the European Commission's Border Breakers award ceremony held at MIDEM 2005 in Cannes, Myslovitz received the European Breakthrough award for Korova Milky Bar as the best-selling album out of the ten new EU member states.

== Discography ==
=== Studio albums ===
- The official album charts of Poland did not begin until late 2000, meaning chart positions for albums released before then, may not reflect their true popularity. Their debut album charted in 2010, 15 years after its release.

Title	Album details	Peak chart positions	Sales	Certifications
Title	Album details	POL	Sales	Certifications
Myslovitz	Released: March 13, 1995; Label: MJM Music PL; Formats: CD, digital download	49		
Sun Machine	Released: September 17, 1996; Label: Sony Music; Formats: CD	—		
Z rozmyślań przy śniadaniu	Released: October 6, 1997; Label: Sony Music; Formats: CD	—		
Miłość w czasach popkultury	Released: October 22, 1999; Label: Sony Music; Formats: CD	12	POL: 200,000+	POL: 2× Platinum
Korova Milky Bar	Released: May 27, 2002; Label: Sony Music; Formats: CD	2		POL: Platinum
Korova Milky Bar (English version)	Released: December 1, 2003; Label: Pomaton EMI; Formats: CD, digital download	—		
Skalary, mieczyki, neonki	Released: December 6, 2004; Label: Pomaton EMI; Formats: CD, digital download	3		
Happiness Is Easy	Released: May 22, 2006; Label: EMI Music Poland; Formats: CD, digital download	1	POL: 30,000+	POL: Platinum
Nieważne jak wysoko jesteśmy...	Released: May 30, 2011; Label: EMI Music Poland; Formats: CD, digital download	1	POL: 15,000+	POL: Gold
1.577	Released: May 28, 2013; Label: EMI Music Poland; Formats: CD, digital download	8		
Wszystkie narkotyki świata	Released: March 3, 2023			
"—" denotes a recording that did not chart or was not released in that territory.

=== Compilation albums ===
Title	Album details	Peak chart positions	Sales	Certifications
Title	Album details	POL	Sales	Certifications
The Best Of	Released: June 9, 2003; Label: Sony Music; Formats: CD	3	POL: 100,000+	POL: Platinum
Single 1995-2005	Released: April 25, 2005; Label: Sony BMG; Formats: CD (Box set)	—		
"—" denotes a recording that did not chart or was not released in that territory.

=== Video albums ===
Title	Album details	Sales	Certifications
O sobie 1995-2001	Released: March 11, 2002; Label: Sony Music; Formats: DVD		
Życie to surfing	Released: December 4, 2004; Label: EMI Music Poland; Formats: DVD		
Happiness Is Easy live	Released: December 12, 2006; Label: EMI Music Poland; Formats: DVD	POL: 10,000+	POL: Platinum
