= Jacek Lachowicz =

Polish musician, author and producer (born 1972)

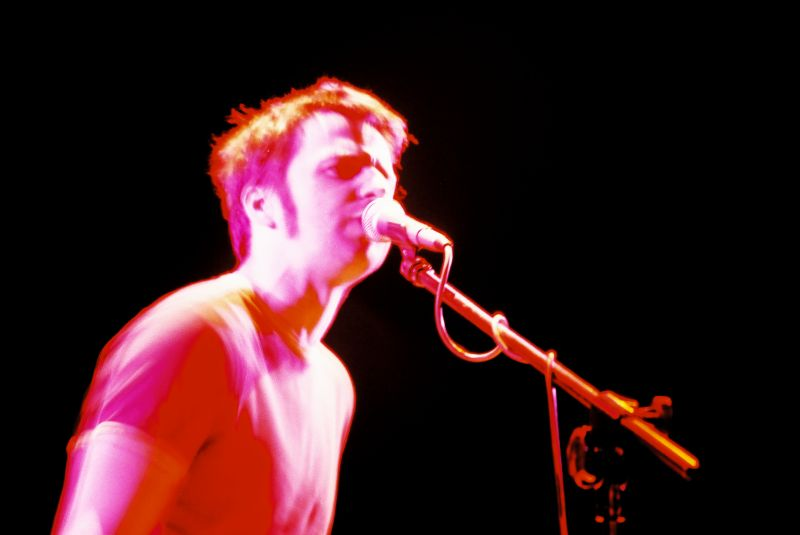
Jacek Lachowicz

Jacek Lachowicz (born 15 November 1972 in Gostynin) is a Polish musician, author and producer. He began his musical career playing synthesizer in the alternative rock group Ścianka from 1996 to 2005. He played synthesizer in 2000 in the group Lenny Valentino (along with other members of Ścianka) before the group split in 2001. Currently, he has a solo career as a singer-songwriter under the name "Lachowicz". His songs are associated with alternative music and he made the top of the major Polish music channels with Płyń. In early 2008, Lachowicz and Ania Dabrowska joined to perform Płyń, which then became for many weeks the most-heard song on Polish radio stations.

== Solo discography ==
- Split EP (2004)
- Jacek Lachowicz (album) (2004)
- Za morzami (2007)
- Runo (Mystic, 2008)
- Pigs, Joys and Organs (Mystic, 2009)
