= Artur Rojek =

Polish guitarist and singer

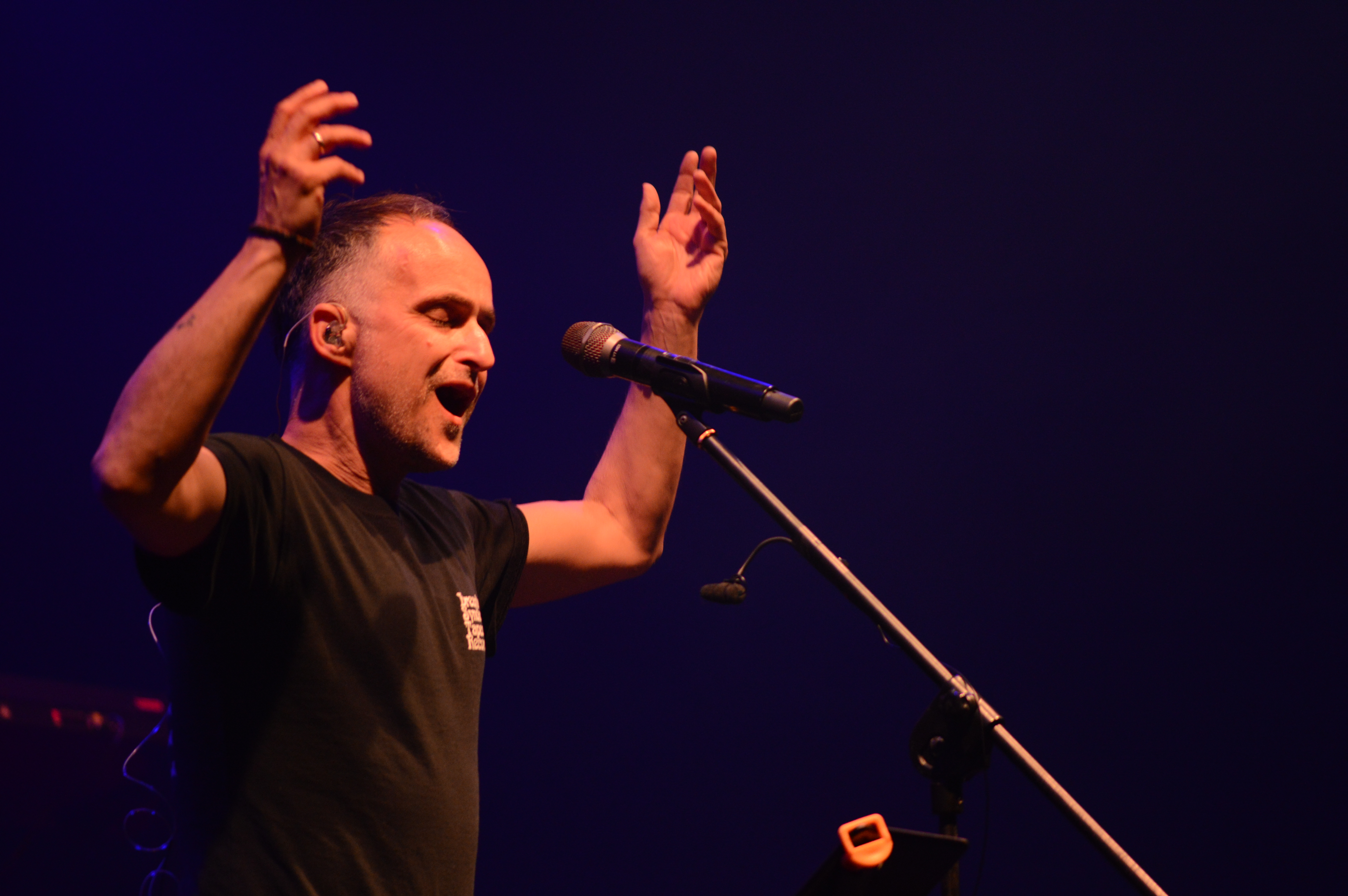
- Rojek in 2022
- Born: 6 May 1972 (age 54); Mysłowice, Poland
- Education: Jerzy Kukuczka University of Physical Education in Katowice
- Occupations: Musician, singer
- Spouse: Anna (Dominik) Rojek
- Children: Two (sons)
- Musical career
- Genres: Rock
- Instrument: Guitar
- Years active: 1992–present
- Label: Kayax
- Website: www.arturrojek.pl

Artur Marcin Rojek (born 6 May 1972) is the former guitarist and lead singer of the Polish alternative rock group Myslovitz. He and the lead guitarist Wojciech Powaga founded the Mysłowice-based group in 1992. He was also the guitarist, vocalist, and main songwriter for the dream pop band Lenny Valentino, which formed in 1998 and disbanded in 2001.

He is the artistic director of Off Festival, an annual music festival established in 2006, which was held in his hometown Mysłowice until 2009. Now the festival takes place in Katowice.

On 20 April 2012, Myslovitz informed about Rojek's departure in an official message signed by all members of the group.

In April 2014, Rojek released his debut solo album, Składam się z ciągłych powtórzeń.

Of his early trajectory, Rojek states, "I started my musical adventure with OMD. Then there were early U2 records and first guitar UK bands, like [the] Housemartins." He has also namechecked the House of Love, the Stone Roses, Ride, the High, the Boo Radleys and Galaxie 500.

== Discography ==
Studio albums

Title	Album details	Peak chart position	Sales	Certifications
Title	Album details	POL	Sales	Certifications
Składam się z ciągłych powtórzeń	Released: 4 kwietnia 2014; Label: Kayax/Agora; Formats: CD, digital download	2	POL: 60,000+	POL: 2× Platinum
Kundel	Released: 13 marca 2020; Label: Kayax/Agora	4		

=== Music videos ===
Title	Year	Directed	Album	Ref.
"Beksa"	2014	Michał Braum	Składam się z ciągłych powtórzeń	
"Syreny"	2014	Tomasz Gliński	Składam się z ciągłych powtórzeń	
