= Casimir the Great 1st Secondary School in Zduńska Wola =

Casimir the Great High School in Zduńska Wola
- I Liceum Ogólnokształcące im. Kazimierza Wielkiego w Zduńskiej Woli
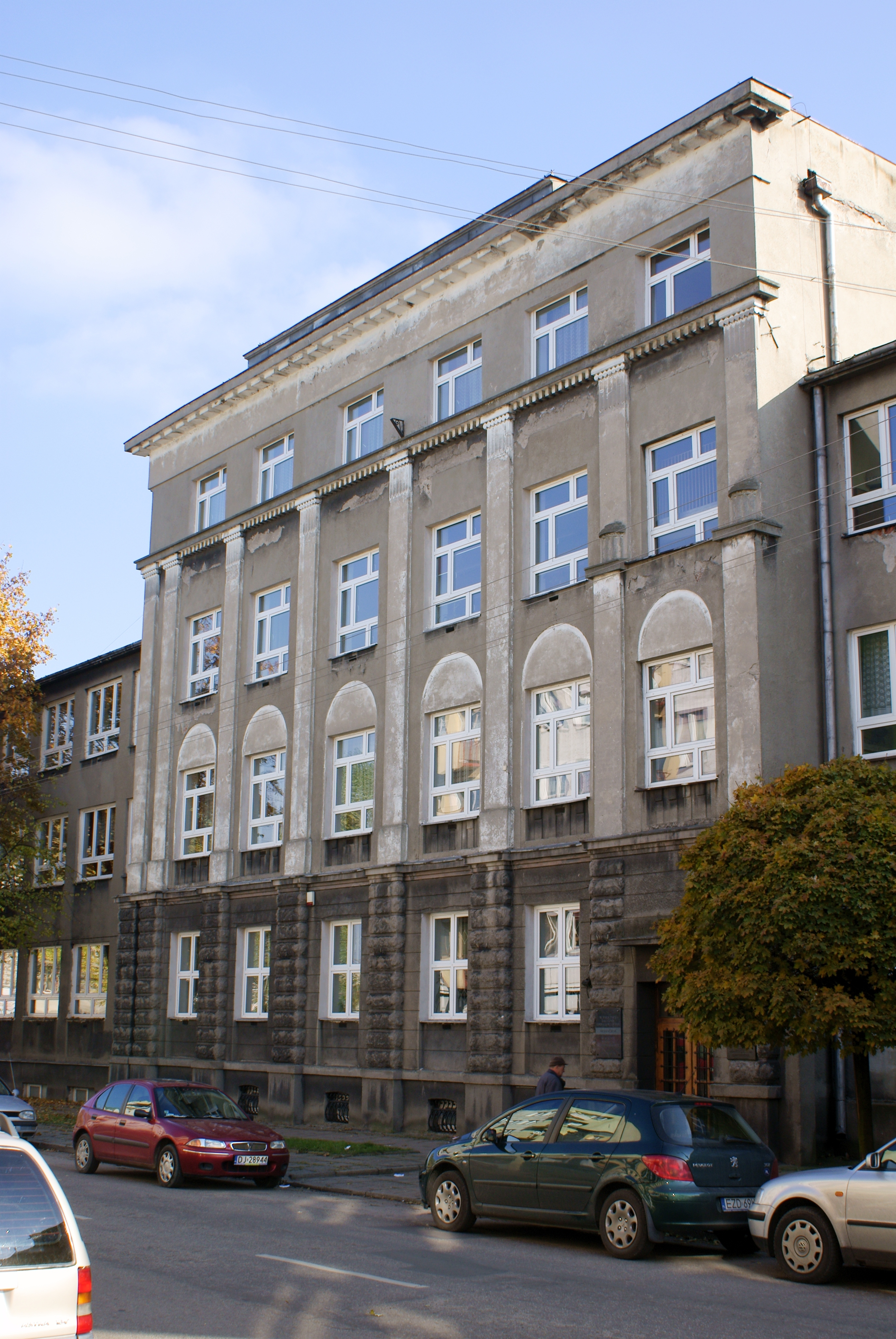

Location
- Dąbrowskiego 6 Zduńska Wola, Łódź Voivodeship; Poland
- Coordinates: 51.602192°N 18.938319°E

Information
- School type: Public, High School
- Patron saint: Casimir the Great
- Founded: 1905
- Principal: Tomasz Siemienkowicz
- Age: 16 to 19

Casimir the Great High School in Zduńska Wola (Polish: I Liceum Ogólnokształcące im. Kazimierza Wielkiego w Zduńskiej Woli) is a public secondary school founded in 1905, and located at 6 Dąbrowskiego Street in Zduńska Wola, Poland.

== Notable alumni ==
- Justyna Majkowska
- Danuta Dudzińska-Wieczorek
- Magda Femme
