= Michał Wiśniewski =

Polish pop vocalist (born 1972)

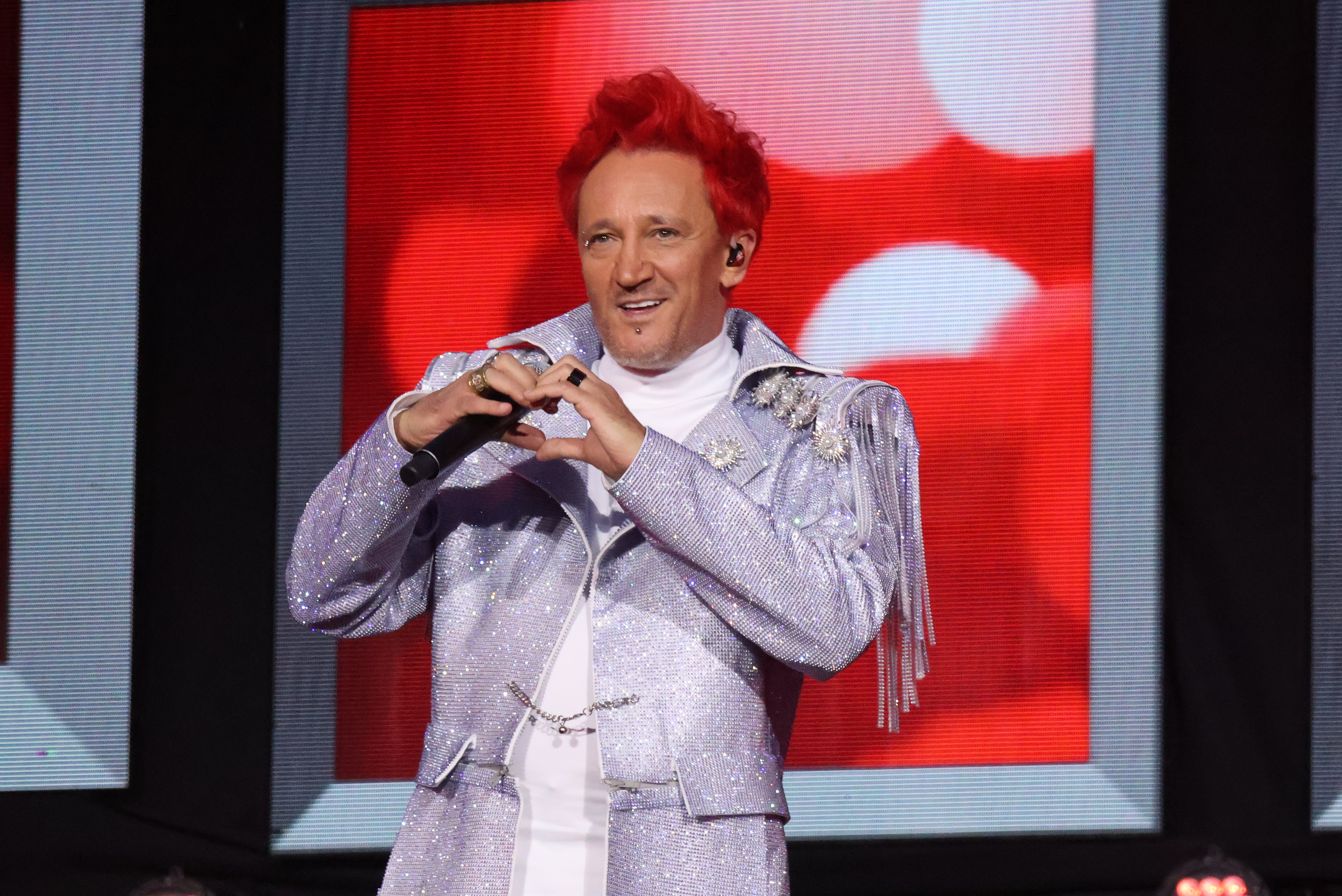
- Wiśniewski in 2025
- Born: Michał Krystian Wiśniewski; 9 September 1972 (age 54); Łódź, Poland
- Occupations: Singer, entrepreneur, poker player
- Spouses: Magda Femme (m. 1996; div. 2001) Mandaryna (m. 2002; div. 2006) Anna Świątczak (m. 2006; div. 2011) Dominika Tajner-Idzik (m. 2012; div. 2019) Pola Lubas (m. 2020; sep. 2026)
- Partner: Mandaryna (since 2026)
- Children: 6 (3 daughters, 3 sons)
- Musical career
- Genre: Pop
- Years active: 1994-present
- Labels: EMI Music Poland, My Music
- Member of: Ich Troje

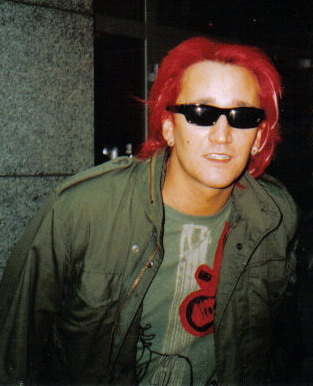
frontman Ich Troje

Michał Krystian Wiśniewski (born 9 September 1972 in Łódź) is a Polish pop vocalist, leader of the pop group Ich Troje, who sang for Poland at the 2003 and 2006 Eurovision Song Contests. He is known for his characteristic red hair, but his hair has also been green, pink, orange, black and white in the past.

== Biography ==
Michał was raised in Poland by his grandmother and after her death he lived in Germany with his aunt's family. He holds both Polish and German citizenship. He has two brothers, Jakub and Jarosław. Wiśniewski had no contact with his mother Grażyna during his childhood. They renewed their contact in the 2000s. Mrs. Wiśniewska lives in Michał's flat in Warsaw.

In Poland he is known for being the leader of the pop group Ich Troje. Wiśniewski created this group in 1995 with Jacek Łągwa and Magda Femme (Wiśniewski married Femme one year later). Femme was Ich Troje's first vocalist from 1995 to 2001, when she and Michał divorced. Their next vocalist was Justyna Majkowska from 2001 to 2003 and in this time Ich Troje was the most popular pop group in Poland. They represented Poland at the 2003 Eurovision with the song Keine Grenzen. They placed seventh, the second best result for Poland at Eurovision (after Edyta Górniak's second place in 1994). Then Majkowska left the group. In 2003 Wiśniewski chose a new vocalist, Anna Świątczak who won the special eliminations in the TVP show Szansa na sukces. Michał married Anna in 2006. That same year Ich Troje won the Polish eliminations in the 2006 Eurovision Song Contest with the song Follow my heart. Former Ich Troje vocalists, Justyna Majkowska and Magda Femme and Real McCoy were invited to perform with Michał Wiśniewski, Jacek Łągwa and Anna Wiśniewska. Ich Troje failed to reach the finals in Athens. Anna Wiśniewska left the group in 2010 to start her solo career. She divorced Michał in June 2011.

The fourth Ich Troje vocalist was Norwegian Jeanette Vik. In 2011 Michał took part in the TVP show Bitwa na głosy. He represented Łódź, Poland and found sixteen talented vocalists from that city to perform different songs. They were eliminated in the fourth episode and placed seventh. One of the girls who sang on this team, Justyna Panfilewicz became the fifth Ich Troje vocalist in 2011.

Ich Troje released eight albums from 1996 to 2008. The most popular are Ad. 4 (2001) and Po piąte... a niech gadają (2002). Their sixth album, 6-ty ostatni przystanek (2004) was thought to be the last album of that group but after a few years they reunited and released their seventh album 7 grzechów głównych in 2006.

Wiśniewski has played in two films: Star (Polish: Gwiazdor) (2002) and Lawstorant (2005). He took part in a TVN reality show I Am What I Am (Polish: Jestem jaki jestem) and the reality show Show Your Face (Polish: Twoja Twarz Brzmi Znajomo) for VIVA! Poland television. He also founded the band Red Head.

=== Personal life ===
Michał Wiśniewski has been married five times and has six children. He is known for giving his children non-typical names for Polish language, especially of French origin. He is fluent in German language.

In 1996 he married Magda Femme, a singer and Ich Troje's first vocalist, in a civil ceremony. They divorced in 2001. In November 2013 Wiśniewski stated in an interview that he proposed to Femme after taking LSD. Their marriage was kept secret in order to save the popularity of the band. Before their divorce, Michał accused Magda of being a lesbian and having an affair with her manager.

In 2000 he started dating Ich Troje's new dancer, Marta Katarzyna Mandrykiewicz. They married in a civil ceremony in 2002 and in a religious ceremony on 10 December 2003 in Kiruna, Sweden. Their wedding was transmitted by Polish television. Michał and Marta have a son, Xavier Michał Wiśniewski (born 24 June 2002 in Warsaw) and a daughter, Fabienne Marta Wiśniewska (born 21 August 2003 in Warsaw). They separated in 2005 and divorced on 18 April 2006.

In 2003, he met Anna Katarzyna Świątczak, whom he selected as Ich Troje's next vocalist after her performance at the Polish music show Szansa na sukces. They married in Las Vegas in February 2006. Michał and Anna have two daughters: Etienette Anna Wiśniewska (born 17 September 2006 in Warsaw) and Vivienne Vienna Wiśniewska (born 2 February 2008 in Warsaw). In July 2010, Anna announced her separation from Michał and they divorced on 26 June 2011.

On 11 July 2011 Wiśniewski announced his engagement to Dominika Tajner-Idzik, daughter of Apoloniusz Tajner. They married on 30 June 2012 near Pisz and divorced on 30 September 2019 in Warsaw. In April 2026 Dominika revealed that she divorced Michał because she didn't want to have more children.

In December 2019, Michał got engaged to 36-year-old Paulina (Pola) Ewa Lubas, born Bydlarz, a divorced mother of four children, whom he met via the internet months earlier. Their civil wedding took place in Magdalenka in April 2020. They have two sons: Falco Amadeus Wiśniewski (born 30 January 2021) and Noël Cloé Wiśniewski (born May 2023). In March 2026 Michał and Pola announced their separation and are now divorcing. In July 2026 Paulina accused Michał that their marriage ended because he betrayed her with his second wife.

In December 2025 Wiśniewski informed that he underwent a vasectomy.

In July 2026 he confirmed that he was in a romantic relationship with his second wife, Marta Wiśniewska.

=== Marriages and descendants ===
- married Magdalna Pokora in a civil ceremony in 1996, they divorced in 2001;
- married Marta Mandrykiewicz in a civil ceremony in 2002 and in religious ceremony in 2003, they divorced in 2006;
  - son Xavier Michał Wiśniewski born in June 2002;
  - daughter Fabienne Marta Wiśniewska born in August 2003;
- married Anna Katarzyna Świątczak in a civil ceremony in 2006, they divorced in 2011;
  - daughter Etienette Anna Wiśniewska born in September 2006;
  - son Falco Christian Wiśniewski miscarried in May 2007;
  - daughter Vivienne Vienna Wiśniewska born in February 2008;
- married Dominika Tajner-Idzik, born Tajner in a civil ceremony in 2012, they divorced in 2019;
- married Paulina Ewa Lubas, born Bydlarz in a civil ceremony in 2020; they separated in 2026;
  - son Falco Amadeus Wiśniewski born in January 2021;
  - son Noël Cloë Wiśniewski, born in May 2023.

== Discography ==
Title	Album details	Peak chart positions
Title	Album details	POL
Sweterek cześć 1, czyli 13 postulatów w sprawie rzeczywistości with Andrzej Wawrzyniak	Released: 21 February 2012; Label: EMI Music Poland; Formats: CD	43
La Revolucion	Released: 26 November 2013; Label: My Music; Formats: CD	36
"—" denotes a recording that did not chart or was not released in that territory.
