= Strunin =

Strunin is a surname. Notable people with the surname include:

- Leo Strunin (fl. 1997–2000), president of the Royal College of Anaesthetists
- Sasha Strunin (born 1989), Polish singer, actress, and model
  - Sasha Strunin discography
