= Sasha Strunin discography =

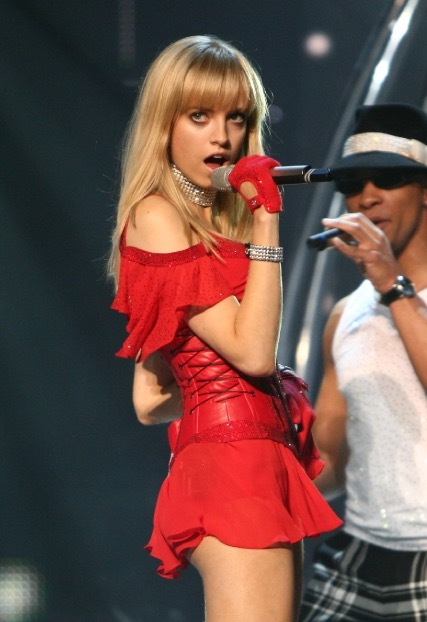
- Strunin with The Jet Set during their semi-final performance at the Eurovision Song Contest 2007
- Studio albums: 2
- EPs: 1
- Singles: 10
- Music videos: 9

Polish singer Sasha Strunin has released two studio albums, one extended play, ten singles, and nine music videos.

== Albums ==
=== Studio albums ===
| Title | Details |
|---|---|
| Sasha | Released: 21 September 2009; Label: Sony Music Entertainment Poland; Formats: CD, digital download |
| Woman in Black | Released: 14 October 2016; Label: Agencja Muzyczna Polskiego Radia; Formats: CD, digital download |

=== EPs ===
| Title | Details |
|---|---|
| Stranger | Released: 29 October 2013; Label: Believe Digital; Formats: CD, digital download |

== Singles ==
=== As lead artist ===
| Title | Year | Album |
|---|---|---|
| "To nic kiedy płyną łzy" | 2009 | Sasha |
| "Zaczaruj mnie ostatni raz" | 2009 | Sasha |
| "Ucisz moje serce" | 2010 | Sasha |
| "Chcę zatrzymać czas" | 2010 | Sasha |
| "Game Over" | 2011 | Non-album single |
| "Stranger" | 2013 | Stranger |
| "Woman in Black" | 2016 | Woman in Black |

=== As featured artist ===
| Title | Year | Peak chart positions | Album |
| Title | Year | POL TV | Album |
|---|---|---|---|
| "Emely" (Danny featuring Sasha Strunin) | 2009 | — | Set Your Body Free (Polish release) |
| "Muzyki moc" (as part of VIVA and Friends) | 2010 | 2 | VIVA 10 lat |
| "Magia Świąt" (as part of reALICJA) | 2013 | — | Non-album single |
"—" denotes releases that did not chart.

== Music videos ==
| Title | Year | Director(s) |
|---|---|---|
| "Emely" | 2009 | Radek Wikiera, Maciej Pawełczyk |
| "To nic kiedy płyną łzy" | 2009 | Unknown |
| "Zaczaruj mnie ostatni raz" | 2009 | Roman Przylipiak |
| "Muzyki moc" | 2010 | Jacek Szymczak, Marek Kremer |
| "Game Over" | 2012 | Łukasz Bieniecki |
| "Overrated Men" | 2012 | Sasha Strunin (Note: The video was created by Strunin in a found footage technique.) |
| "Stranger" | 2013 | Sasha Strunin (credited as Alexandra Strunin) |
| "Magia Świąt" | 2013 | Roman "Lalicz" Lalicki |
| "Woman in Black" | 2016 | Artur Szatałowicz, Elwira Nowicka |
