= Wojciech Cezary Jagielski =

Polish journalist and drummer (born 1963)

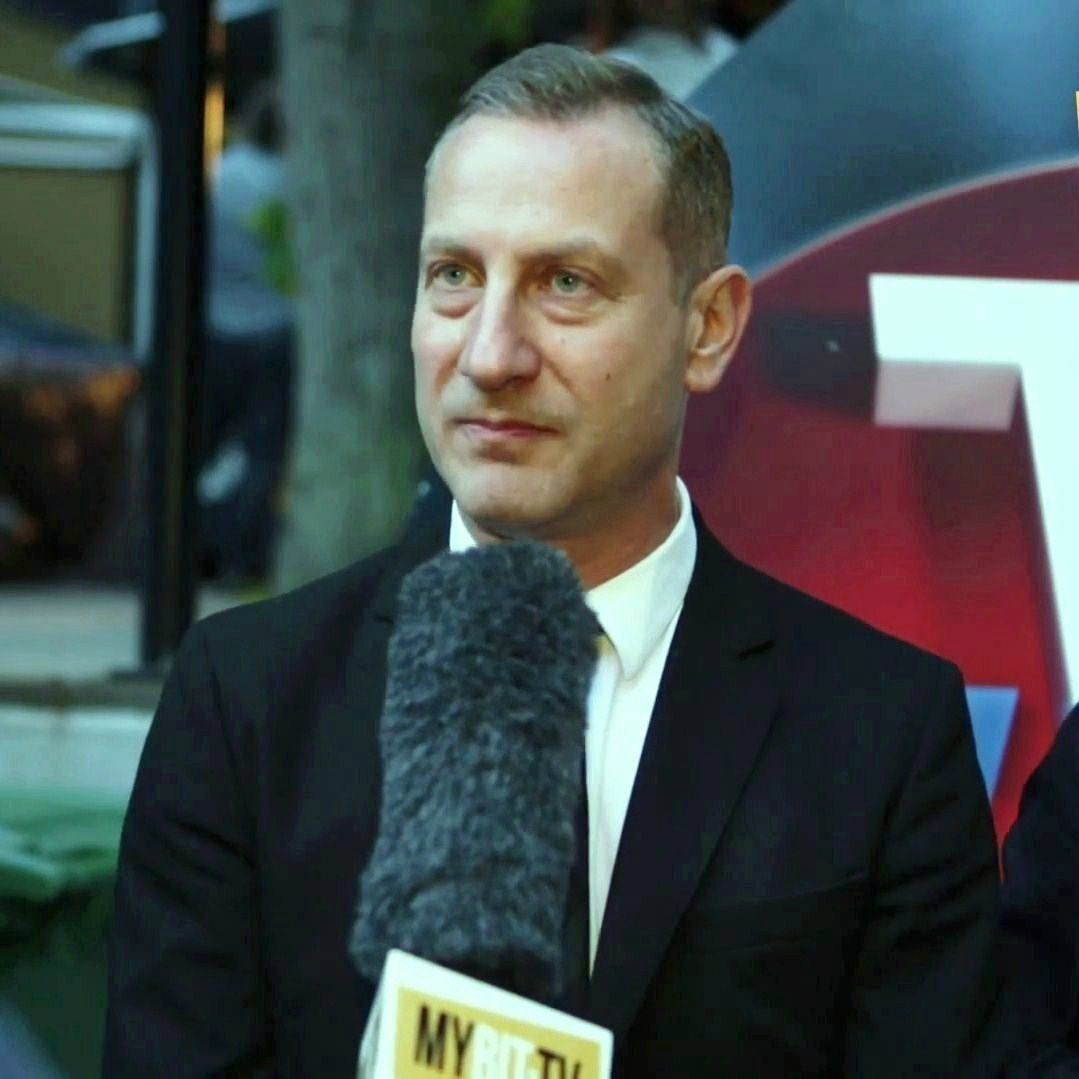
- Jagielski in 2014
- Born: 15 September 1963 (age 63); Zduńska Wola, Łódź Voivodeship, Poland
- Education: Medical University of Warsaw
- Occupations: Journalist; DJ; drummer
- Years active: 1995–present

Wojciech Cezary Jagielski (born 15 September 1963, in Zduńska Wola) is a Polish journalist, working for radio and television, drummer, and doctor of medicine by training.

== Summary ==
In 1992, Jagielski earned a degree in the Faculty of Medicine at the Medical University of Warsaw.

=== Radio ===
He worked for the Polish commercial station Radio ZET, beginning as a DJ, then as a music supervisor (from 1995 to July 2007 and again during 2010 to 2015). He hosted auditions including Słodka szesnastka Radia Zet ('Radio Zet's Sweet Sixteen') and Raz-dwa-trzy, śpiewasz ty ('One, two, three now you sing'); along with Karolina Korwin Piotrowska, he hosted Mniej więcej serio ('Kind of Seriously') and Mniej więcej poniedziałek ('Kind of Monday'). He interviewed over 350 prominent people from all over the world, including pop musicians and celebrities from cinematography and media. From April 2012 to May 2015, he hosted an audition on Radio ZET called Doktor Zet.

=== Television ===
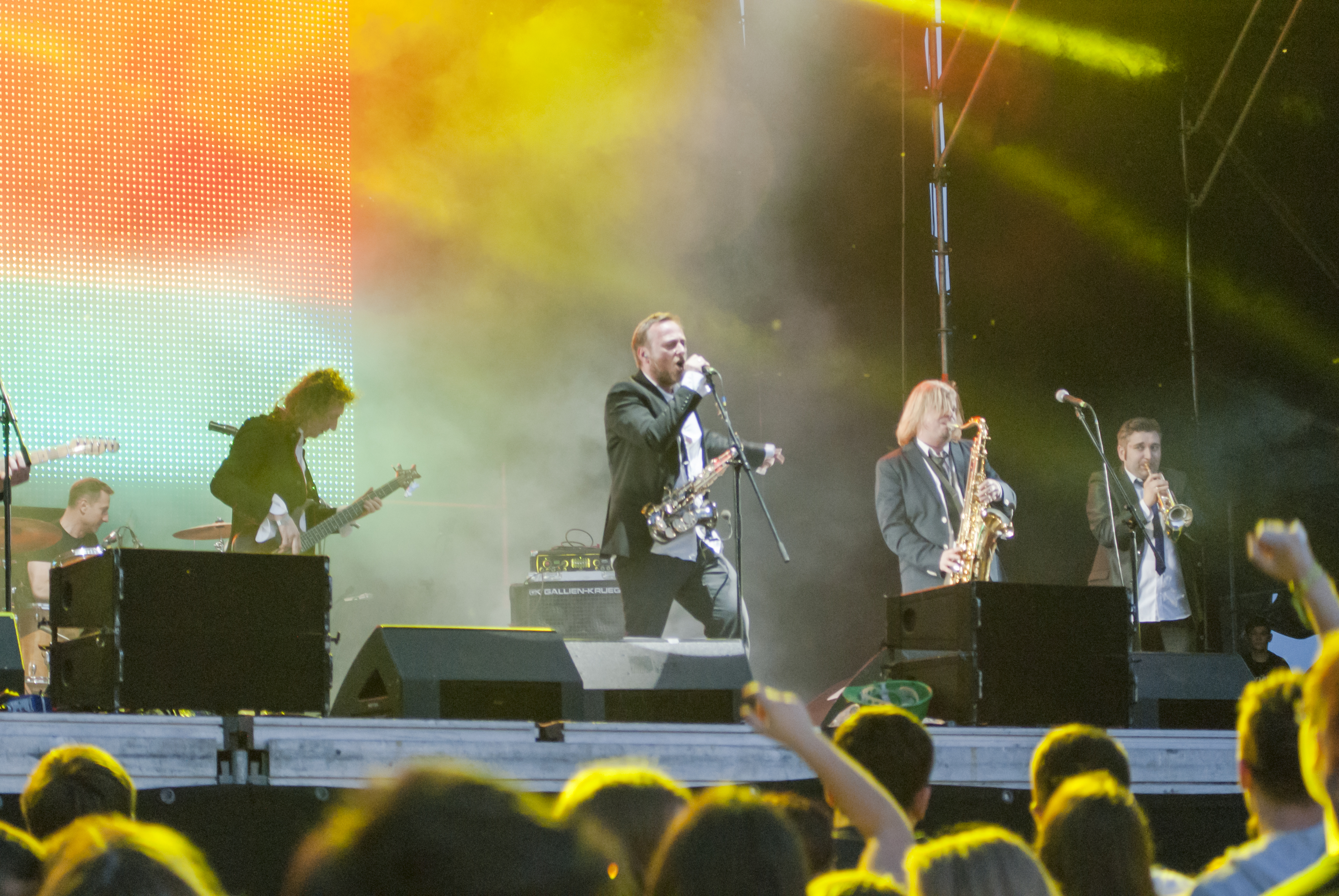
Jagielski (far left) with bandmates Roman Osica, Marian Hilla, Mariusz Gierszewski, and Krzysztof Tomaszewski at the Ursynalia festival, 2013

He began his work for the Dutch television channel RTL 7, where he hosted Wieczór z Wampirem, then after a change of programming, he hosted Wieczór z Jagielskim, which was broadcast in 1999 on TVP2. In 2006, along with Kazimiera Szczuka, he co-hosted Dwururka, a talk show for TVN. With Ewelina Kopic, he hosted a game show, Zakręcony tydzień ('A Crazy Week' ), which was the first satire show based on the news in Poland. From September 2007 to June 2010, along with Jolanta Pieńkowska, he co-hosted the morning show Dzień Dobry TVN ('Good Morning TVN' ). From 3 September 2010 to August 2012, along with Beata Sadowska, he co-hosted another morning broadcast, Pytanie na Śniadanie, on TVP2. He also sat in as jury for the first and third editions of the Polish version of talent show Clash of the Choirs (Bitwa na głosy). Since January 2014, he has hosted the programme Wojtek Jagielski na żywo ('Wojtek Jagielski live' ) on Superstation TV.

=== Music career ===
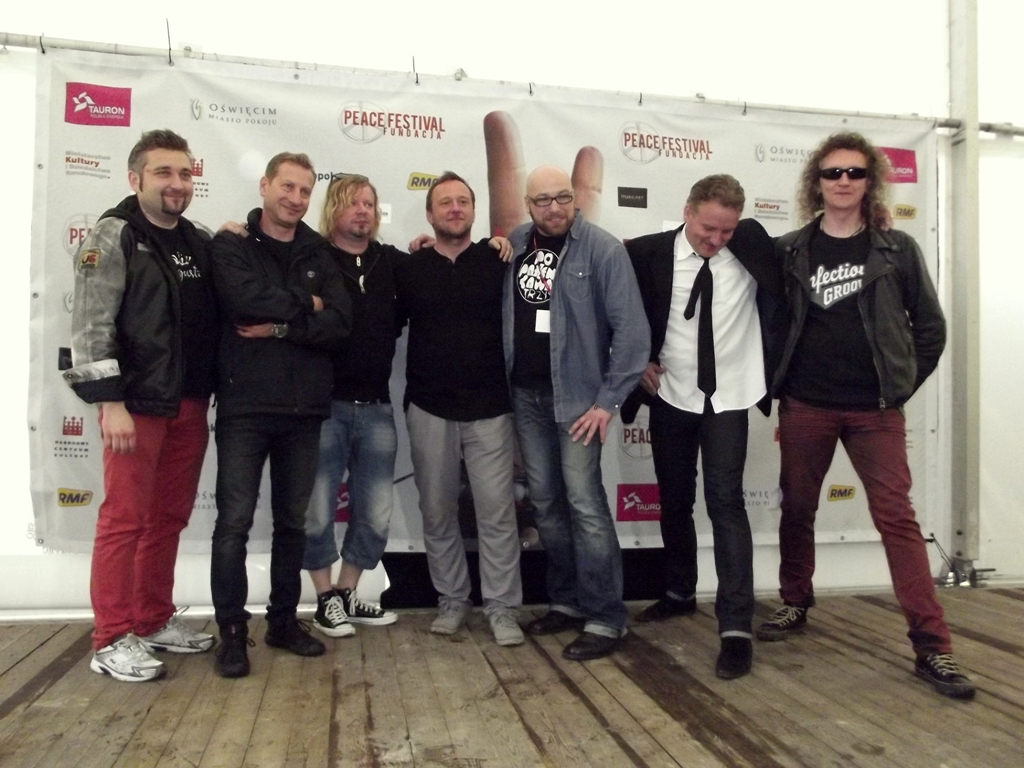
Jagielski (second from left) at the 4th Life Festival Oświęcim, in 2013, an annual music event in Oświęcim, Poland

In the 1980s, Jagielski co-founded and performed as drummer for the Polish bands Kontrola W. and Kosmetyki Mrs. Pinki, as well writing lyrics, such as the song "Miłość na polu minowym". With both of these bands, he took part in numerous editions of the Jarocin Festival (in 1982/3 and 1985/6). Sporadically, he plays drums for a band called Poparzeni Kawą trzy.

== Filmography ==
- 1999: The Lousy World (Świat według Kiepskich) – as priest Krtęć
- 2006: Na Wspólnej (On Wspólna Street ) – as a journalist
- 2008: Karolcia – as a truck driver
- 2008: Niania – as a TV presenter
- 2009: 39 and a Half (39 i pół) – as himself
