= Sasha Strunin =

Polish singer, actress and model (born 1989)

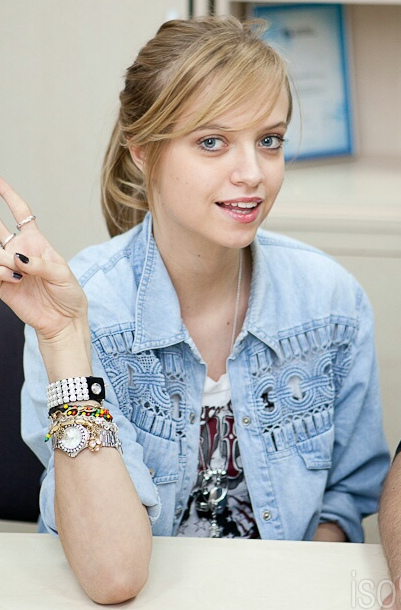
- Strunin, 2010

Background information
- Also known as: Alexandra Strunin
- Born: Aleksandra Igoriewna Strunina; 27 October 1989 (age 37); Leningrad, Russian SFSR, USSR
- Origin: Poznań, Poland
- Genres: Pop; electronic; jazz
- Occupations: Singer; actress; model
- Years active: 2003–2016
- Labels: Sony Music Entertainment Poland; Believe Digital; Agencja Muzyczna Polskiego Radia
- Formerly of: The Jet Set
- Website: iamsasha.eu

Aleksandra Igoriewna Strunina (Russian: Александра Игоревна Струнина; born 27 October 1989), known professionally as Sasha Strunin, is a Polish singer, actress and model. From 2005 to 2008, she was a member of the Jet Set, with whom she represented Poland in the Eurovision Song Contest 2007.

== Early life and education ==
Strunin was born on 27 October 1989 in Saint Petersburg, Russia (then Leningrad, Soviet Union) to a Russian father and Ukrainian mother. Her parents, Igor and Vita, were both opera singers. In addition to her Russian and Ukrainian heritage, she also has Polish and Belarusian roots, with her great-grandmother coming from the Polish Stankiewicz noble family. Strunin spent the first two years of her life living in Ukraine, and then moved to Poznań in Poland with her parents in 1992, after they got jobs performing at the Grand Theatre, Poznań. Although she was born in Russia, Strunin states that her primary language is Polish and that she identifies herself as a Pole. She is an Orthodox Christian.

Strunin finished primary school in 2002, and then began her studies at Poznań Gimnazjum No. 22. In 2008, she graduated from the IV Private High School in Poznań. While in school, Strunin began playing piano, and learned English and German. In 2009, she began studying photography at the University of Fine Arts in Poznań, and graduated in 2013.

As of 2025, Strunin is a second-year film directing student at the Warsaw Film School. In 2025 she made her directorial debut with the school short I Gaze at the Sky (Polish: Patrzę w niebo), which won the Student Narrative Short Film Grand Prize at the March On! Festival in Washington, D.C., and the Let’s Start The Revolution international short film competition in Lublin.

== 2003–2008: Career beginnings and the Jet Set ==
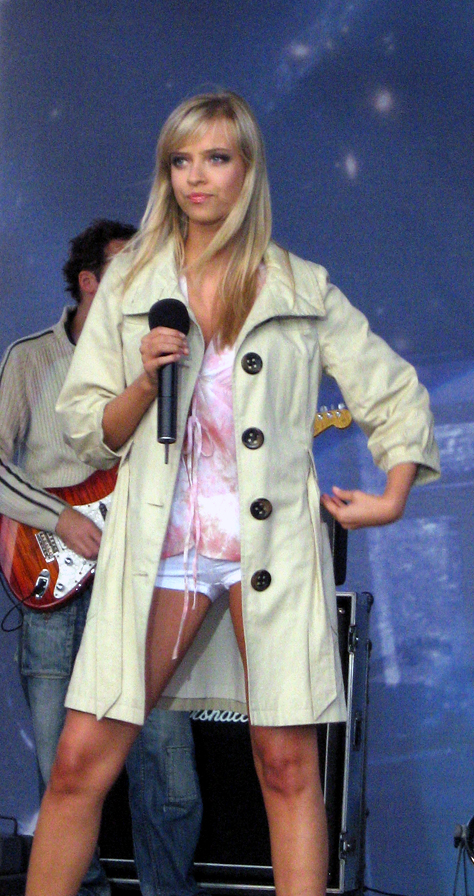
Strunin performing with The Jet Set in 2007.

Strunin began her music career in 2003, performing at the 10th Festival of English Song in Brzeg, where she performed "When You Told Me You Loved Me" by Jessica Simpson, and won the children's category. In 2005, she reached the semi-finals of season four of Idol Poland.

In December 2005, Strunin became the lead vocalist of the Jet Set. The following month, they performed in the Polish national final for the Eurovision Song Contest 2006 with the song "How Many People". The song came third in the competition. That spring, along with Belgian singer Danzel, the band began the Simplus Tour, which had sixteen concerts in Poland. The band released their debut studio album, Just Call Me, in July 2006. The album was certified gold by the Polish Society of the Phonographic Industry, and reached number-35 on the Polish albums chart. They performed the album's title single at the 2006 Sopot International Song Festival, placing second.

In 2007, the Jet Set competed in the Polish national final once again, with the song "Time to Party". This time, they won the competition and gained the right to represent Poland in the Eurovision Song Contest 2007, held in Helsinki. In preparation for the competition, they toured Europe, visiting Spain, Ireland, Russia, Ukraine, Cyprus, Latvia, and Lithuania. At the Eurovision Song Contest, they placed fourteenth in the semi-final, and did not qualify for the final. In February 2007, they rereleased their debut studio album, Just Call Me, and at the 44th National Festival of Polish Song in Opole, they received the Song of the Year Award for "Time to Party". In 2008, they released their final single, "The Beat of Your Heart".

On 1 January 2009, the group announced that they had disbanded, as they had previously only been formed to release one studio album.

== 2009–2010: Solo career beginnings ==
After the disbandment of the Jet Set, Strunin signed a solo contract with Sony Music Entertainment Poland. That year, she released the single "Emely", in a collaboration with Swedish singer Danny Saucedo. She later released her debut solo single, "To nic kiedy płyną łzy", which was submitted to represent Poland in the 2009 Sopot International Song Festival. In September 2009, she released her debut solo studio album, titled Sasha. It was the 25th best-selling album in Poland in September 2009. The album's second single, "Zaczaruj mnie ostatni raz", was released in November. In 2010, she recorded the song, "Muzyki moc", along with Polish musicians Doda, Ewa Farna, Gosia Andrzejewicz, Kasia Cerekwicka, Kasia Wilk, Piotr Kupicha, Sylwia Grzeszczak, and others, to celebrate the tenth anniversary of VIVA Poland.

== 2011–2016: Independent career and Woman in Black ==
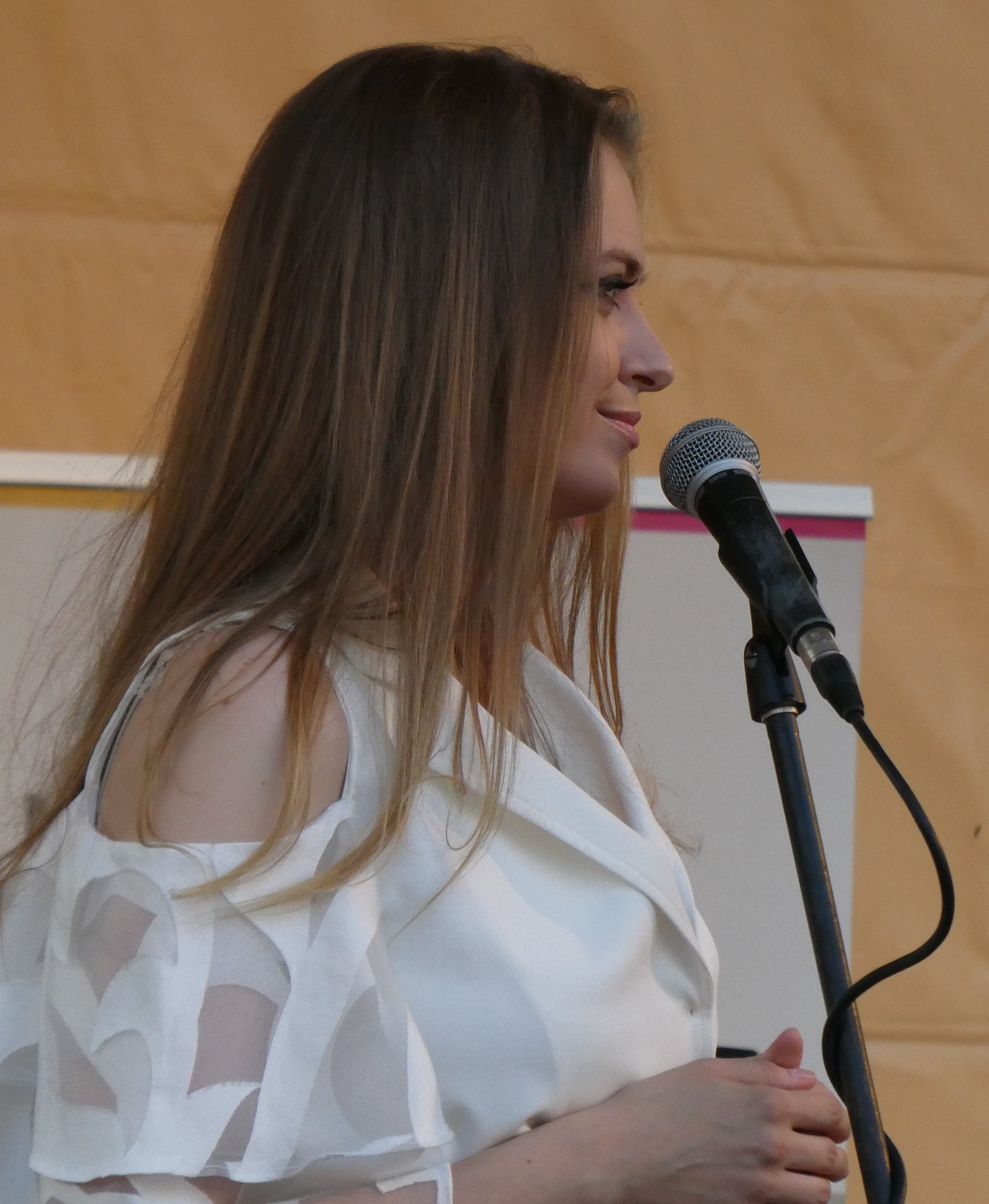
Strunin performing in Warsaw in 2019.

In May 2011, Strunin left Sony in order to perform as an independent artist. She founded the production company AS Music Production, along with music producer Andrzej Prymuszewski, but the project was soon ended. In September, she released the single, "Game Over". In 2013, Strunin performed as the opening act for French singer Zaz at a Warsaw show. Strunin premiered her debut EP, Stranger, on 29 October 2013. Its title track promoted the release.

In December 2013, Strunin recorded a Christmas single, "Magia Świąt", as a part of the reALICJA project. All proceeds from the sale of the song were donated to Alicja Borkowska, a Polish actress who had suffered a stroke the previous month. In 2014, Strunin was to take part in SuperDebiuty at the 51st National Festival of Polish Song in Opole, but was disqualified and replaced with another artist. The reason for her disqualification was because all participants must not have released more than one album previously, whether as a solo artist or as a member of a group. In November 2014, Strunin performed at a concert to celebrate the 25th anniversary of Employers of Poland. The concert was attended by then Polish President Bronisław Komorowski and former Polish President Lech Wałęsa.

In 2015, Strunin began recording music for her second solo studio album. All songs on the album were composed by American jazz musician Gary Guthman. The album, titled Woman in Black, was released on 14 October 2016. The album's self-titled lead single was released on 30 September 2016.

== Film ==
In 2025, Strunin made her directorial and screenwriting debut with the student short film I Gaze at the Sky (Polish: Patrzę w niebo), produced by the Warsaw Film School. The 24-minute drama is set during the early days of the Russian invasion of Ukraine and follows a music teacher of Ukrainian descent working at a Russian primary school, where Ukrainian children displaced by the war are subjected to ideological indoctrination.

The film was selected for the Short Film Competition at the 50th Gdynia Film Festival in 2025. It subsequently screened at film festivals in Europe and the United States and received several awards, including the Student Narrative Short Film Grand Prize at the March On! Festival in Washington, D.C., Best International Short Film at the Evolution Mallorca International Film Festival, and the Silver Grape Award at the 55th Lubuskie Film Summer in Łagów.

In 2026, I Gaze at the Sky received both the jury award for Best Short Film and the Audience Award for Best Short Film at the Kosciuszko Foundation Washington, D.C. Polish Film Festival. It also won the Audience Award for Best International Short at the 2026 Florida Film Festival.

=== Awards and selected festival appearances ===
Year	Film	Festival or organisation	Award or selection	Result
2025	I Gaze at the Sky	March On! Festival	Student Narrative Short Film Grand Prize	Won
2025	I Gaze at the Sky	Let's Start the Revolution International Short Film Competition	Best Short Film	Won
2025	I Gaze at the Sky	Gdynia Film Festival	Short Film Competition	Nominated
2025	I Gaze at the Sky	Evolution Mallorca International Film Festival	Best International Short Film	Won
2026	I Gaze at the Sky	Kosciuszko Foundation Washington, D.C. Polish Film Festival	Best Short Film	Won
2026	I Gaze at the Sky	Kosciuszko Foundation Washington, D.C. Polish Film Festival	Audience Award for Best Short Film	Won
2026	I Gaze at the Sky	Florida Film Festival	Audience Award for Best International Short	Won
2026	I Gaze at the Sky	Lubuskie Film Summer	Silver Grape Award	Won

== Modeling and acting ==
Before beginning her music career, Strunin was a model. She was signed to Elite Model Management and had modeled in cities such as Paris and Tokyo.

In 2008, Strunin was a contestant on the celebrity edition of Big Brother Poland 5. She voluntarily left the house on day 30 due to her obligations as a singer which prevented her from remaining in the house, placing fifth overall.

In 2010, Strunin had a recurring role on the Polish soap opera Pierwsza miłość, as Kalina Świętochowska. She also acted in the film Koniec świata, as Oliwia, and voiced a character in the Polish-language version of the PlayStation 3 video game TV Superstars. In 2011/12, she was the face of clothing brand GAVEL's autumn-winter line.

== Personal life ==
On 18 April 2015, Strunin became engaged to music producer Marek Piotr Szumski while in Rome.

== Discography ==
- Sasha (2009)
- Woman in Black (2016)

== Filmography ==
Year	Title	Role	Notes
2010	Koniec świata	Oliwia	
2010	Pierwsza miłość	Kalina Świętochowska	TV series
2010	TV Superstars	Bella	Video game; Polish-language version
