= ITI CD =

Studio album by Ich Troje
- Released: 1997
- Studio: Izabelin Studios
- Genre: Rock
- Label: Koch International

ITI CD is the second album to be released by the Polish band Ich Troje, in 1997.

The track "Mandy" is a Polish-language cover of the Barry Manilow song of the same name.

== Track listing ==
No.	Title	Length
1.	"Drzwi"	4:40
2.	"Loop"	3:58
3.	"Lustro"	3:58
4.	"Spowiedź"	2:50
5.	"Les"	3:30
6.	"S.O.S."	3:42
7.	"Gwiezdna noc"	5:36
8.	"Miłość i zdrada"	3:40
9.	"Sam"	3:40
10.	"Koniec"	3:32
11.	"Mnie to wali"	3:40
12.	"Jastrzębia profil"	3:52
13.	"Wznieś mnie"	4:28
14.	"Dąbrowa"	3:48
15.	"Mandy"	3:02
Total length:		58:37
