= Charizma (band) =

Swedish rock band

- Origin: Oskarshamn, Sweden
- Genres: Rock, pop, CCM, hard rock
- Years active: 1981–present (hiatus)
- Labels: Pama Records (SE), Talking Music (SE), Asaph Musik (D)
- Members: Bo Nikolausson; Jan Nikolausson; Göran Nikolausson; Johan Mauritzson; Thomas (TK) Karlsson
- Past members: Mats Tärnfors; Peter Koski
- Website: Charizma.com

Charizma is a Swedish rock band formed in Oskarshamn. It was founded in 1981 by the three brothers Bo, Jan and Göran Nikolausson. In 1996 the band added two members, Johan Mauritzson and Thomas Karlsson. In November 2008 the band went on an indefinite hiatus.

Starting out as a hard rock trio in the early 1980s, at the end of the 1990s Charizma turned into a radio-friendly rock band focusing on melodies and strong vocal elements.

Following the release of their debut album Rock the World (1985), Charizma was selected as OKEJ magazine's "Band of the Month" in its February 1986 issue. The feature described the band's origins in Oskarshamn, where brothers Bo, Jan and Göran Nikolausson rehearsed in their parents' basement before borrowing 100,000 Swedish kronor to finance the recording of their debut album. It also noted that Rock the World was recorded at KSL Studio in Sollentuna with producer Hasse Engström and reported growing interest in the band from the United Kingdom and the United States.

The band is primarily known for its songs "Waiting (Here for you)" and "Run to God". The song "Join hands" (1990) was a major hit in Estonia and became part of the Singing Revolution.

Charizma performed in the pre-selections for Eurovision Song Contest in 2004 in Estonia (Eurolaul) and in 2007 in Poland (Piosenka dla Europy 2007).

Charizma has toured all over the world including USA, UK, Germany, Australia, Switzerland, Austria, Liechtenstein, Estonia, Poland, Sweden, Finland, Norway, Denmark, The Netherlands and Faroe Islands.. In 2025 the band reunited for a concert in Oskarshamn, Sweden.

== Members ==
- Bo Nikolausson - bass guitar, backing vocals (1981–present)
- Jan Nikolausson - drums, percussion (1981–present)
- Göran Nikolausson - guitars, backing vocals (1981–present)
- Johan Mauritzson - lead vocals, Keyboards (1996–present)
- Thomas (TK) Karlsson - rhythm guitar, backing vocals (1996–present)

Until 1994, lead vocals were performed by Bo Nikolausson. Between 1991 and 1994, Johan Mauritzson played keyboards with the band, but was not an official member.

== Discography ==
=== Albums ===
Title	Year	Label	Producer
Rock the world	1985	United Rock Records, Sweden	Hasse Engström & Charizma
Rock The World (Polish release)	1987	Tonpress, Poland	Hasse Engström
Rockin' The World Together (Soviet release)	1991	Melodiya, Soviet Union	Hasse Engström & Charizma
The Ultimate Call	1993	United Rock Records, Sweden	Hasse Engström & Charizma
To Be Continued…	1997	Asaph Musik, Germany	Stig Lindell
The Basics Of Life	1999	Asaph Musik, Germany	Mick Nordström & Charizma
Life in 3D	2003	Asaph Musik/PAMA Records/Talking Music	Johan Glössner
Common Creed (Track on Life is precious)	2006	Permanent Recordings, Nashville, USA	Johan Glössner

=== Singles ===
Title	Year	Label	Producer
"Turn Me On" (EP)	1986	United Rock Records	Hasse Engström & Charizma
"Join Hands" (Maxi single)	1990	United Rock Records	Hasse Engström & Charizma
"Higher Than The Heavens" (CD single)	1997	Asaph Music	Stig Lindell & Charizma
"Round and Round" (CD single)	1998	Asaph Musik	Mick Nordström & Charizma
"Run to God" (CD-single)	1999	Megaphone Records/Asaph Musik	Rico and Bear
"Waiting (Here for you)" Club mix(CD single)	2003	Asaph Musik/PAMA Records/Talking Music	Johan Glössner. Club mix by S G Petersson
"Where do you go?" [Radio remix] (CD single)	2004	Talking Music/PAMA Records	Johan Glössner.
"I give you a mountain" (CD single)	2004	Talking Music	Stig Lindell & Henrik Sethsson
"Emily" (Digital EP)	2007	Pama Records	Johan Glössner

== Chart positions ==
- "Waiting (Here for you)" reached no. 3 on the Swedish Top40 best selling chart on September 13, 2003. It spent 8 weeks on the list. The song also peaked at no. 62 on the Europe Official Top 100 on September 27, 2003
- "Where do you go?" reached no. 13 on the Swedish Top40 best selling chart on January 17, 2004.
- "I give you a mountain" reached no. 41 on the Swedish best selling chart on May 21, 2004.

== Videography ==
- "Emily"- shot January 2007, Oskarshamn Sweden. Directed and edited by Morgan Karlsson. Song entered in the Polish qualifications for Eurovision Song Contest.
- "Turn me on" - shot in 1989, Los Angeles. Directorial debut for Jay Torres, who later worked with Madonna and Aerosmith and directed the TV shows Alias and Desperate Housewives.
