= 3 (Ich Troje album) =

Studio album by Ich Troje
- Released: May 1999
- Genres: Pop, rock
- Label: Universal

Ich Troje chronology
The Best Of... (1999)	3 (1999)	Ad.4 (2001)

3 is the third studio album and by Polish pop band Ich Troje, released in 1999.

== Track listing ==
No.	Title	Length
1.	"Hit Mix'99 Czyli Co To Jest Za Jazda"	3:57
2.	"A Wszystko To...(Bo Ciebie Kocham)!"	3:59
3.	"Die Freien"	3:51
4.	"Woalka"	4:50
5.	"Koks"	3:41
6.	"Do M."	3:42
7.	"Nienawiść"	4:10
8.	"Gwiazdor"	3:55
9.	"Ptaki Bez Skrzydeł"	3:31
10.	"Kołysanka Dla Ani"	3:24
11.	"Nie Ma Czadu"	3:42
12.	"Jugosławia"	5:07
13.	"Przyroda"	3:56
14.	"Jutro"	5:29
15.	"Jeanny - End Of The Story"	6:44
16.	"End - Epitafium Dla Romka"	1:36
17.	"Jeanny - End Of The Story (Acoustic)"	3:57
18.	"A Wszystko To...(Bo Ciebie Kocham)! (Remix)"	4:12

== Certifications ==
Region	Certification	Certified units/sales
Poland (ZPAV)	Platinum	100,000^{*}
^{*} Sales figures based on certification alone.
