= Zduńska Wola =

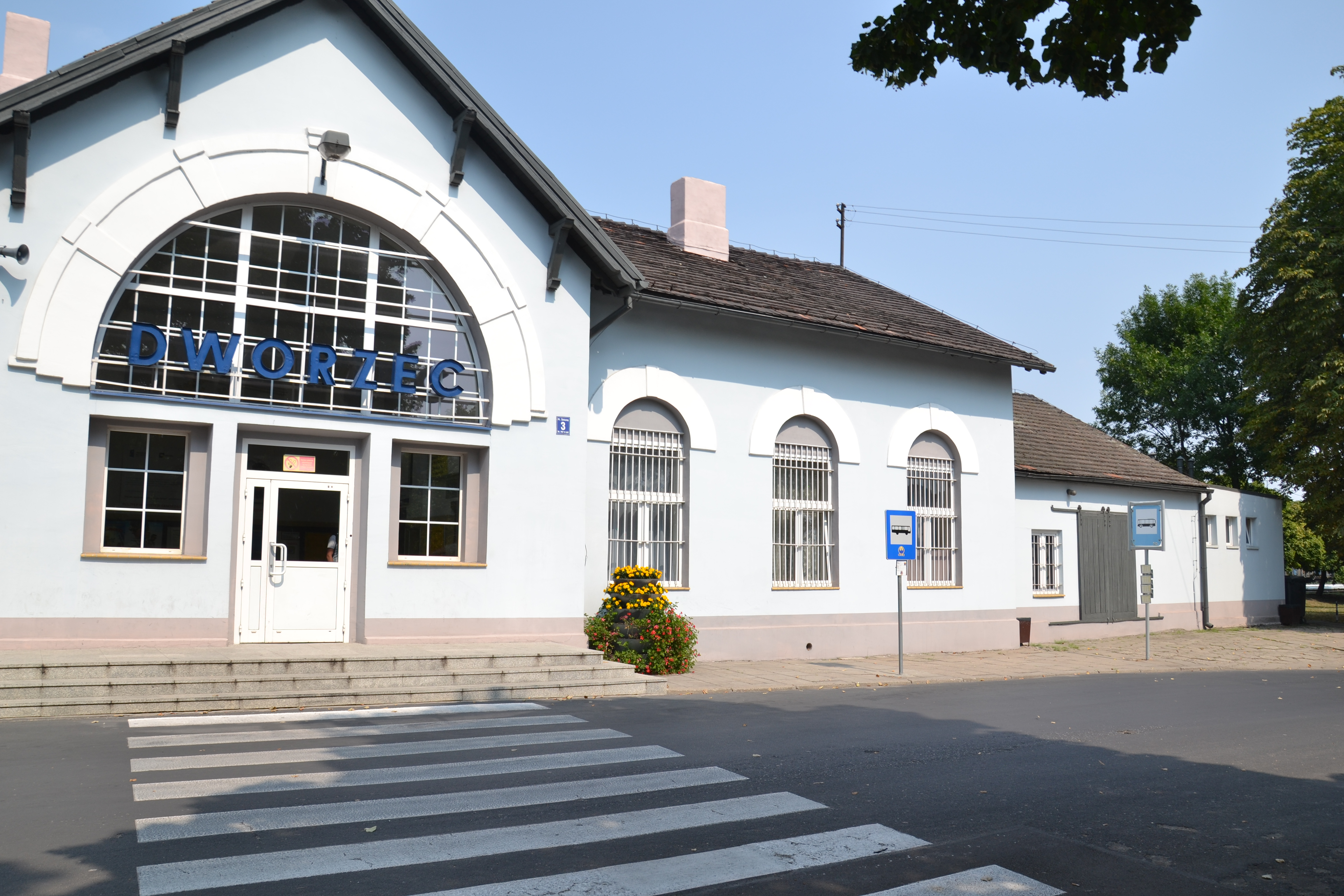
- Train station in Zduńska Wola

- Flag Coat of arms

- Location within Poland
- Coordinates: 51°36′N 18°58′E
- Country: Poland
- Voivodeship: Łódź
- County: Zduńska Wola
- Gmina: Zduńska Wola (urban gmina)
- First mentioned: 1394
- City rights: 1825

Government
  - City mayor: Konrad Pokora (KO)

Area
  - Total: 24.58 km^{2} (9.49 sq mi)

Population (31 December 2021)
  - Total: 40,730 ▼
  - Density: 1,657/km^{2} (4,292/sq mi)
- Time zone: UTC+1 (CET)
  - Summer (DST): UTC+2 (CEST)
- Postal code: 98-220
- Car plates: EZD
- Website: http://www.zdunskawola.pl

Zduńska Wola [ˈzduɲska ˈvɔla] is a city in central Poland with 40,730 inhabitants (2021) that is the seat of Zduńska Wola County in the Łódź Voivodeship. It was birthplace of the Catholic saint Maximilian Kolbe and of Maksymilian Faktorowicz (Max Factor Sr.), the founder of the Max Factor cosmetics company.

== History ==
=== Early history ===
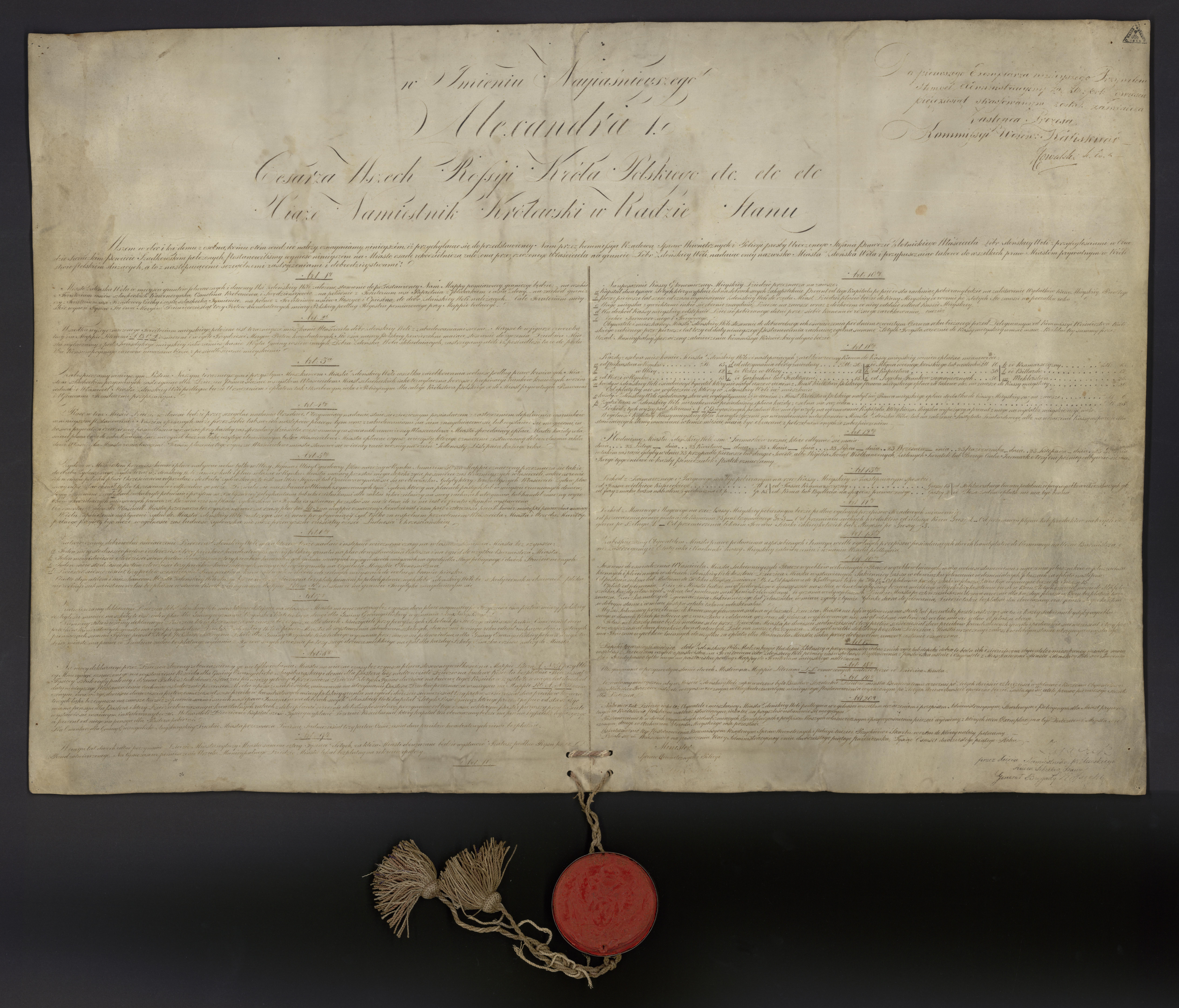
Document of granting city rights to Zduńska Wola

The city was first mentioned and documented in 1394. Zduńska Wola was then part of an important trade route which crossed through Poland and connected Eastern and Western Europe. Administratively, it was located in the Sieradz Voivodeship in the Greater Poland Province of the Kingdom of Poland. Over the course of its history, the town was owned by nobles or industrialists. At the beginning of the 18th century, Zduńska Wola was purchased by the aristocratic Złotnicki family.

The development of the village is closely linked with the rapid influx of the[weavers from the region of Śląsk. In 1817, with the contribution and effort of Stefan Złotnicki, the village flourished and became populated with people Śląsk, Saxony, and Bohemia. In 1824 the town's population reached 1,400 people, including 150 professional textile laborers in 125 private workshops.

In 1827 the population was 2,758 and the town had 320 buildings, of which 30 were made of brick or stone.

=== Industrial development ===
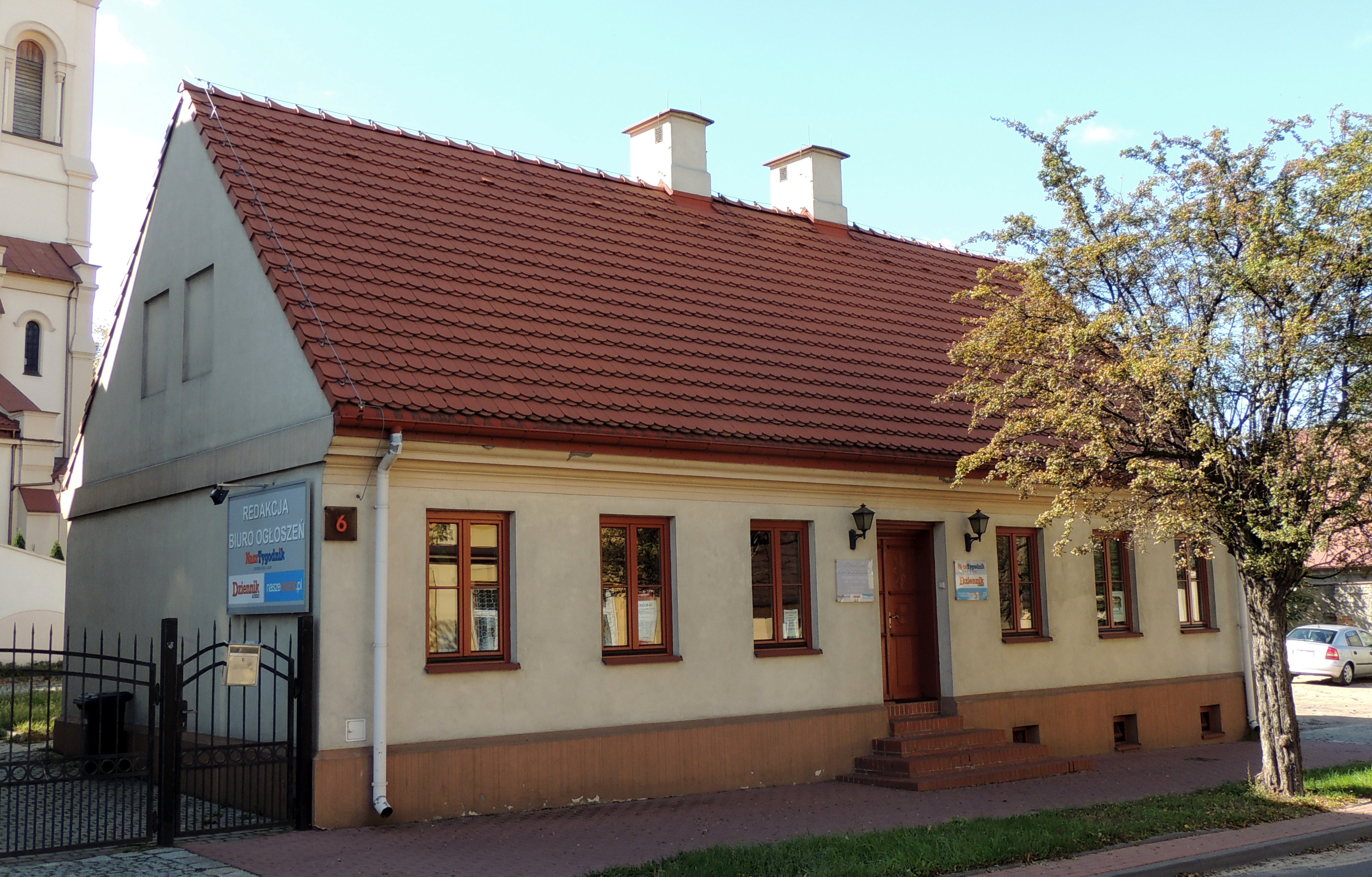
An example of a 19th-century brick plastered weaver's house

The end of the 19th century was a period of dynamic development, which eventually transformed the rural town into a small industrial centre. In 1909 the population was already 22,504 people. Over 50 new industrial enterprises or textile corporations were set up, which employed 5,200 workers. Zduńska Wola gained the nickname "City of Weavers" and out of the 1,360 buildings now standing, approximately 600 were made of brick. In 1892 the first steam brewery was constructed, which contributed to the town's importance in the region. Under the patronage of the Złotnicki family and local business owners, Zduńska Wola was completely remodelled and urbanized; new housing estates were built for the workers and the first city park was opened during this period.

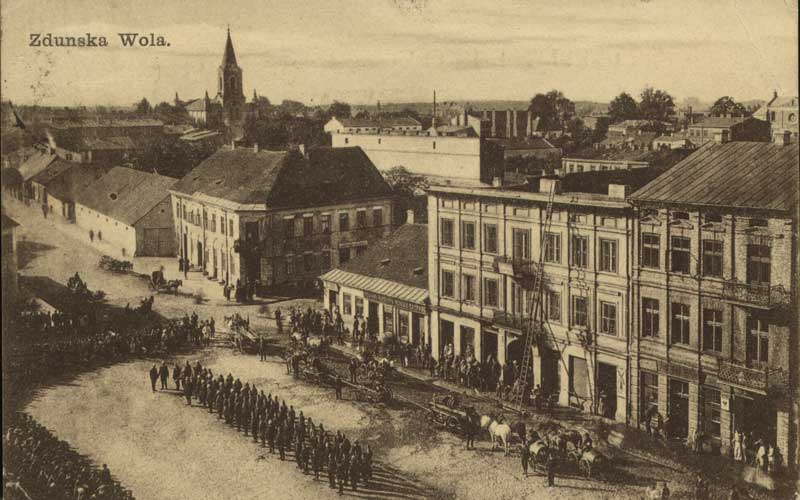
Early 20th-century postcard with the downtown of Zduńska Wola

In 1903 the region was connected with Kalisz and Łódź by rail. In 1902 Zenon Anstadt, a member of a wealthy family of brewers from Łódź, was responsible for the continuous development of the town's infrastructure. Shortly before the outbreak of World War I in 1914, the population of the city was 28,437 people. Under the Imperial German occupation during World War I, the town's population fell to just 12,000 in 1918.

After Poland regained independence in 1918, the city with its industries was rebuilt from the devastation of war. Alongside the former textile industry, new metallurgical enterprises, power plants, public schools, gymnasiums, city hospital and a fire station were established. In 1930 Zduńska Wola became an important transport hub, when it was connected by rail with the Polish port of Gdynia on the Baltic Sea. By 1939 Zduńska Wola was the largest city in the western part of Łódź Voivodeship (province).

=== World War II ===
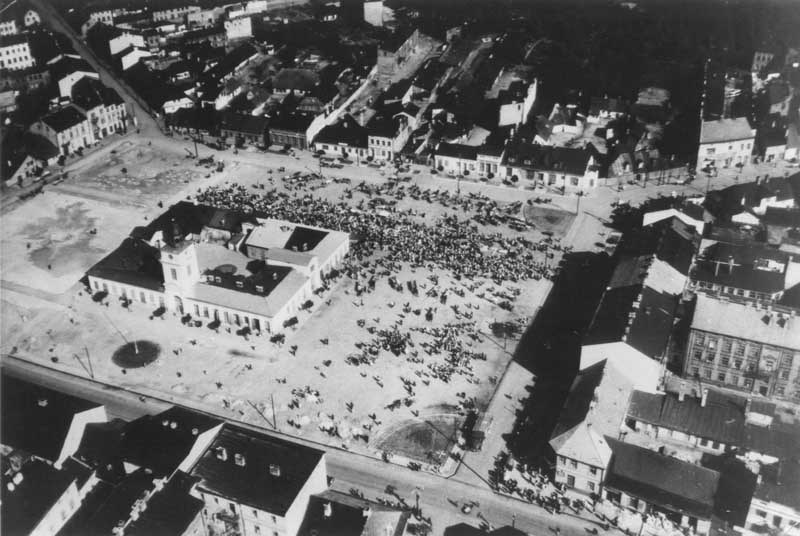
Aerial view of Zduńska Wola in September 1939

During the German invasion of Poland, which started World War II, Germany invaded the town on 6 September 1939, and then the Einsatzgruppe III entered the town to commit various crimes against the populace. The German occupiers incorporated the town directly into the newly formed Wartheland province of Nazi Germany, and changed the town's name to Freihaus to erase traces of Polish origin.

In November 1939, the Germans carried out a public execution of six Polish hostages from nearby Sieradz, and in December 1939 they carried out the first expulsions of 420 Poles. During the Intelligenzaktion, the Germans arrested 169 members of the local Polish intelligentsia already in 1939, and further 187 in 1940–1941. Among the victims were local officials, activists, members of the Polish underground resistance movement and Catholic priests. In total several thousand Poles were deported to forced labour, expelled or arrested. As local Nazi German governor Arthur Greiser expressed during a meeting with the townspeople, Poles were supposed to be servants for the Germans. Germany operated a transit camp for German settlers, who were resettled in occupied Poland as part of the Lebensraum policy. Nevertheless, several Polish resistance organizations operated in the town and among their activities were secret trainings, intelligence, distribution of underground Polish press, sabotage actions and secret schooling.

Nearly all members of the prominent and large Jewish population of Zduńska Wola of around 8,000 at the beginning of the war were murdered as part of the Holocaust On arrival of the German troops in September 1939, local ethnic Germans and Poles looted Jewish property. The Germans shot several Jews at that time and burned the synagogue. Over the next several months, the Jewish community was robbed, brutalized, and confined to a ghetto area. In 1940 and 1941, Jews from other locations were moved into the ghetto which population increased to around 11,000, crowded together and may without means of support. In August 1942, the Jewish population were gathered together. Several hundred were sent to the Łódź Ghetto. Hundreds were shot in the Zduńska Wola cemetery. More than 6,000 and perhaps as many as 9,000 were sent to the Chełmno extermination camp where they were immediately gassed.

About 60 of Zduńska Wola's Jewish population are thought to have survived the war. The German administrator who oversaw the final selection, Hans Biebow, was tried, convicted, and executed after the war for his crimes in Lodz and Zduńska Wola. In contrast, the head of the Jewish council in the town was lauded for his uprightness. Murdered by Biebow after the selection in August, he had refused to collaborate with the Germans or betray his fellow Jews.

The town was freed by the Soviets in January 1945, and then restored to Poland, however with a Soviet-installed communist regime, which then stayed in power until the Fall of Communism in the 1980s. The town also suffered heavy destruction in the war, that was rebuilt with Soviet Union's aide.

=== Modern times ===
Under socialism, between 1945 and 1989, Zduńska Wola and Łódź regained their pre-war importance as the textile industrial centres of central Poland. Since 2014, the town has seen many opportunities and investments, and continues to flourish in the service sector.

It was administratively located in the Sieradz Voivodeship from 1975 to 1998.

== Education ==
Local schools include Tadeusz Kościuszko Primary School and Casimir the Great High School

== Sports ==
The local football team is Pogoń Zduńska Wola. It competes in the lower leagues.

== Twin towns - Sister cities ==
Zduńska Wola is twinned with:

- Zarasai, Lithuania
- Pietrasanta, Italy
- Valmiera, Latvia

== Notable people ==
- Rafał Augustyniak (born 1993), professional footballer
- Danuta Dudzińska-Wieczorek (born 1966), opera singer
- Max Factor Sr. (1877–1938), Polish-American businessman, beautician, entrepreneur and inventor; founder of the Max Factor & Company
- Magda Femme (born 1971), pop singer and songwriter
- Riwka Herszberg, victim of Nazism
- Wojciech Cezary Jagielski (born 1963), journalist
- Maximilian Kolbe (1894–1941), Catholic priest and saint, Conventual Franciscan friar who volunteered to die in place of a stranger in the death camp of Auschwitz
- Lazar Lyusternik (1899–1981), mathematician
- Justyna Majkowska (born 1977), singer
