= Ania Wiśniewska =

Polish singer

Anna Żeńca
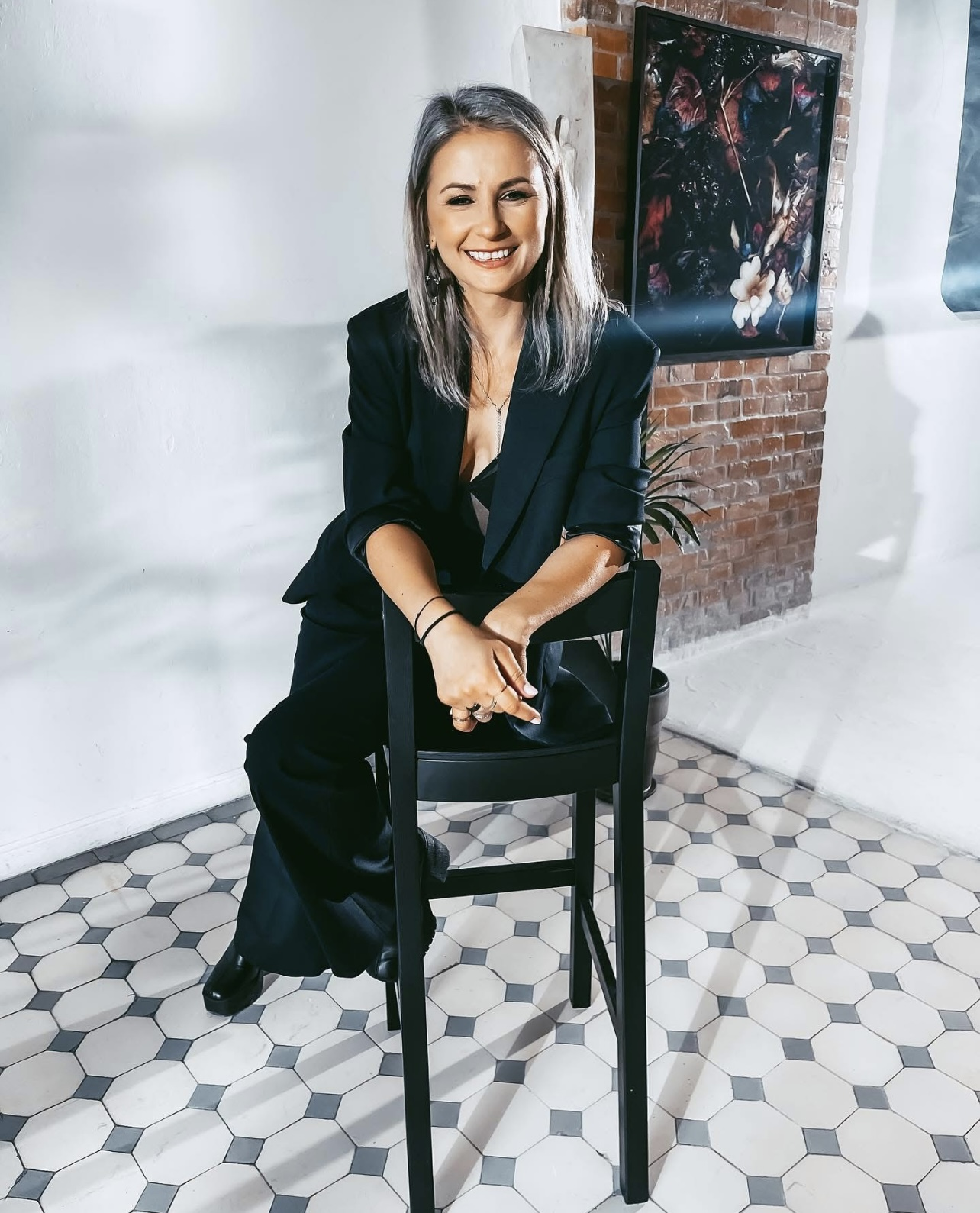
- Born: Anna Katarzyna Magdalena Świątczak; 30 March 1977 (age 49); Katowice or Lubliniec, Poland
- Occupation: Singer
- Spouse(s): 1. Michał Wiśniewski (divorced); 2. Michał Żeńca
- Children: 2 (daughters)
- Musical career
- Also known as: Aniqa
- Genres: Pop
- Label: Songood House
- Formerly of: Ich Troje
- Website: youtube channel

Anna Katarzyna Magdalena Żeńca (born Anna Świątczak 30 March 1977) also known as Aniqa, is a pop singer and ex-wife of Michał Wiśniewski, the leader singer of Ich Troje band, in which she sang between 2003 and 2009. In July 2010 it was officially announced that she was leaving the band to pursue her solo career.

Their first child, Etiennette Anna, was born before they married, on 17 September 2006. Anna miscarried their second child Falco Christian on 15 May 2007. Their third child Vivienne Vienna was born on 2 February 2008.

== 1992-2003: Beginnings ==
She made her debut in 1992 in Zielona Góra, on the continuation of the Soviet Song Festival - "Slavic Bazaar", where she sang with the band Wiolinki, and a year later, together with her friends, founded a punk rock band Kurki Z Jednej Dziórka. In 1995, she took part in the program Szansa for success with the song "Pamiętasz było jesień" by Sława Przybylska. Świątczak won the episode as well as the entire edition of the program at the final concert in the Sala Kongresowa in Warsaw. She also won the audience award in the Debuts competition at the Polish National Song Festival in Opole. She sang in backing vocals in the program Jaka to melodia ?. In the meantime, she recorded backing vocals to pieces released on the albums of Andrzej Piaseczny, Natalia Kukulska, Kaja Paschalska and Sylwia Wiśniewska.

== 2003-2010: Ich Troje and a solo album ==
In 2003, she became the vocalist of the band Ich Troje, replacing Justyna Majkowska. On June 21, 2004, the band's sixth album was released (the first recorded with Anna Świątczak), titled the 6th last stop, which gained the status of a gold record, selling in a circulation of about 35,000 copies. At the end of January 2006, the group took part in Polish eliminations to the 51st Eurovision Song Contest, during which they took the first place with the song "Follow My Heart". In May, the band performed during the concert of the semi-final spectacle and took 11th place in it, not qualifying for the final. On December 18 of the same year, they released their seventh record, entitled Deadly Sins, the album promoted the singles God is Love (2006) and Perfect Love (2007). On December 13, 2008, they released their eighth record entitled The Eighth Foreign Passenger, which was promoted by one single Play In Team (2008).

== From 2016: Mińska LIFE and Punkt zwrotny #Pierwszy ==
On June 24, 2016, she took part in a concert held in Katowice on the occasion of the twentieth anniversary of Ich Troje. In the same year, she released a studio album entitled Minska LIFE, which she recorded along with the Christian Southern Community.

From June 1, 2017, he conducts a religious talk show. Turning point in the Christian television of TBN Polska. In the same year, she announced the release of a studio album, entitled #Pierwszy. The material for the record was recorded in GarażStudio in Sulejówek, the producer of the publishing house will be Andrzej Żarnecki.

== Discography ==
Albums

Title	Details
Aniqa	October 9, 2009
Mińska LIFE	2016
