= Ich Troje =

Polish pop band

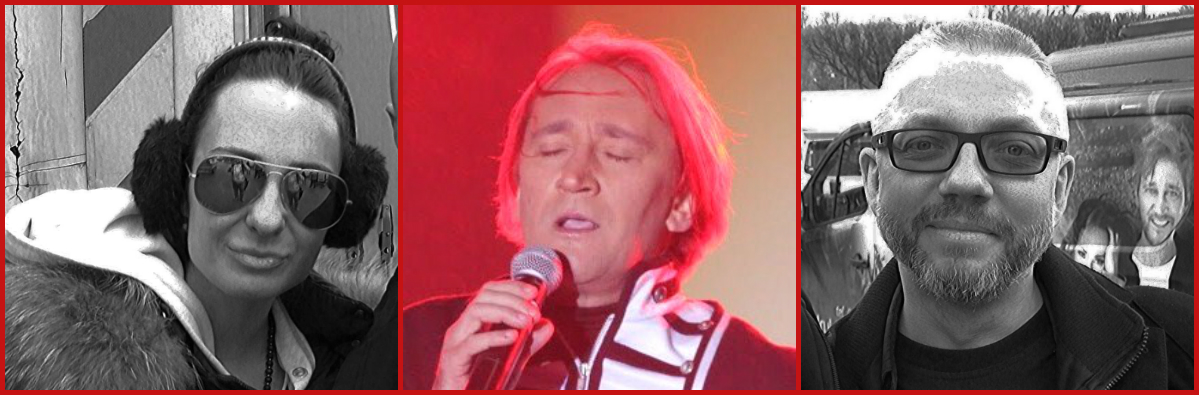

Background information
- Origin: Łódź, Poland
- Genres: pop
- Years active: 1995–present
- Labels: Koch International Poland, Universal Music Poland, Sony Music Entertainment Poland, Etiennette Media, EMI Music Poland
- Members: Michał Wiśniewski; Jacek Łągwa; Martyna Majchrzak
- Past members: Magda Femme; Justyna Majkowska; Anna Wiśniewska; Jeanette Vik; Justyna Panfilewicz; Marta Milan; Agata Buczkowska
- Website: www.ichtroje.pl

Ich Troje ("The Three of Them") is a Polish pop band. Ich Troje was founded in 1996 by songwriter Michał Wiśniewski and composer Jacek Łągwa. Since 2000, Ich Troje has been one of the most successful Polish groups. They have sold more than 1.5 million records since June 2001. Their songs are typically about love, betrayal and break-ups. They represented Poland in the Eurovision Song Contest twice: with "Keine Grenzen – Żadnych granic" in 2003 and "Follow My Heart" in 2006.

== Members ==
Former members are Magdalena Pokora (a.k.a. Magda Femme, 1996–2000), Justyna Majkowska (2000–2003), Elli Mücke (2003) and Ania Wisniewska (2003–2010). After a series of auditions including fan votes, Norwegian singer Jeanette Vik was in December 2010 chosen as the band's next lead singer.

== Eurovision 2003 ==
On 25 January 2003, Polish TV viewers chose Ich Troje to represent them in Eurovision Song Contest 2003 by televoting. The band took part in the contest with the song "Keine Grenzen – Żadnych granic" (English translation: "No Borders"), a trilingual song performed in German, Polish and Russian. The song is a dramatic ballad, in which the singers express their desire to be astronauts, gazing down from space at the earth. As well as the beauty of the spectacle, they sing that from that distance it is impossible to see borders, flags and warfare. The theme of the need for peace is underscored by the multilingual lyrics, in which Polish is performed alongside the languages of two neighbouring states which have historically fought with Poland. The song received the maximum 12 points from Germany but none from Russia. The song finished 7th in a field of 26 entries.

A fully German version of the song was recorded as well. Another trilingual version (French, English, Esperanto) was recorded in 2016.

== Eurovision 2006 ==
The group setup was arranged to add a fifth member when taking part in the Eurovision Song Contest 2006, by adding the German rapper O-Jay (Olaf Jeglitza) of the German Eurodance act, Real McCoy. For Eurovision, credit was Ich Troje featuring Real McCoy and the song was "Follow My Heart". Their music was castigated by critics. The song finished 11th in the semi-final failing to qualify to the final.

== Discography ==
=== Studio albums ===
Title	Album details	Peak chart positions	Sales	Certifications
Title	Album details	POL	Sales	Certifications
Intro	Released: 9 September 1996; Label: Koch International Poland; Formats: CD, digital download	—		
ITI CD	Released: 18 September 1997; Label: Koch International Poland; Formats: CD	44		
3	Released: 24 May 1999; Label: Universal Music Poland; Formats: CD	—	POL: 100,000+	POL: Platinum
Ad.4	Released: 31 May 2001; Label: Universal Music Poland; Formats: CD, digital download	1	POL: 500,000+	POL: Diamond
Po piąte... a niech gadają	Released: 16 May 2002; Label: Universal Music Poland; Formats: CD, digital download	1	POL: 500,000+	POL: Diamond
6-ty ostatni przystanek	Released: 21 June 2004; Label: Universal Music Poland; Formats: CD, digital download	2	POL: 35,000+	POL: Gold
7 grzechów głównych	Released: 18 December 2006; Label: Sony Music Poland; Formats: CD	—		
Ósmy obcy pasażer	Released: 15 December 2008; Label: EMI Music Poland; Formats: CD	42		
Pierwiastek z dziewięciu	Released: 8 December 2017; Label: Warner Music Poland; Formats: CD	37		
Projekt X	Released: 2022; Label: Warner Music Poland; Formats: CD			
Wybiła jedenasta	Released: 2025; Label: Universal Music Polska; Formats: CD			
"—" denotes a recording that did not chart or was not released in that territory.

=== Compilation albums ===
Title	Album details	Peak chart positions	Sales	Certifications
Title	Album details	POL	Sales	Certifications
The Best Of...	Released: 28 September 1999; Label: Koch International Poland; Formats: CD	—		
The Best Of...	Released: 28 April 2003; Label: Universal Music Poland; Formats: CD	1	POL: 70,000+	POL: Platinum
"—" denotes a recording that did not chart or was not released in that territory.

Awards and achievements
Preceded by Piasek with "2 Long"	Poland in the Eurovision Song Contest; 2003	Succeeded by Blue Café with "Love Song"
Preceded by Ivan & Delfin with "Czarna dziewczyna"	Poland in the Eurovision Song Contest; 2006 (with Real McCoy)	Succeeded by The Jet Set with "Time To Party"
