= Ad.4 =

Studio album by Ich Troje
- Released: May 31, 2001
- Genre: Pop
- Length: 49:58
- Label: Universal Music
- Producer: Reim Music Factory

Ich Troje chronology
| 3 (1999) | Ad.4 (2001) | Po piąte... a niech gadają (1999) |

Ad.4 is the fourth studio album by Polish pop band Ich Troje, released in 2001.

== Track listing ==
1. "Intro 4" – 0:56
2. "Powiedz" – 4:06
3. "Zawsze pójdę w twoją stronę" – 3:51
4. "Razem a jednak osobno" – 4:10
5. "Lecz to nie to" – 3:21
6. "Dla ciebie" – 3:45
7. "To tylko chwila" – 3:53
8. "Błędne wojenne rozkazy" – 3:32
9. "Po prostu" – 4:04
10. "Geranium" – 3:50
11. "Pierwsza ostatnia miłość" – 3:53
12. "Zawsze z tobą chciałbym być... (przez miesiąc)!" – 3:42
13. "I stało się..." – 3:11
14. "Wypijmy za to!" – 3:43

== Charts and certifications ==
=== Charts ===
| Chart (2001) | Peak position |
|---|---|
| Polish Albums (ZPAV) | 1 |

=== Certifications ===
| Region | Certification | Certified units/sales |
|---|---|---|
| Poland (ZPAV) | Diamond | 700,000 |
