= 6-ty ostatni przystanek =

Studio album by Ich Troje
- Released: 2004
- Genre: Pop
- Language: Polish
- Label: Decca

6-ty ostatni przystanek is the name of the 2004 album by Polish band Ich Troje, released on Decca Records. The album is known as 6. ostatni przystanek in the native Polish. All tracks are in the Polish language.

== Track listing ==
1. "Szósty przystanek"
2. "Spojrzenia mówią wszystko"
3. "Jak mogłeś"
4. "Czerwona smycz"
5. "Homo homini lupus"
6. "Pytania i odpowiedzi"
7. "Don't go west"
8. "Spadaj"
9. "Rossie z Łodzi"
10. "Sexappeal"
11. "Taniec"
12. "Letnia piosenka o niczym ważnym"
13. "Skłamałem"
14. "Chciałabym"
15. "Requiem"
16. "Ostatni przystanek"

== Charts and certifications ==
=== Charts ===
Chart (2004)	Peak position
Polish Albums (ZPAV)	2

=== Certifications ===
Region	Certification	Certified units/sales
Poland (ZPAV)	Gold	35,000^{*}
^{*} Sales figures based on certification alone.
