= TV Superstars =

2010 video game

- PAL cover art
- Developer: Cambridge Studio
- Publisher: Sony Computer Entertainment
- Platform: PlayStation 3
- Release: NA: 13 October 2010; AU: 28 October 2010; EU: 29 October 2010
- Genres: Party
- Modes: Single-player, multiplayer

TV Superstars is a 2010 party video game developed by Cambridge Studio and published by Sony Computer Entertainment for the PlayStation 3. It utilizes the PlayStation Move controller.

== Gameplay ==
Gameplay of "Let's Get Physical"

In the game players take the role of a reality television show contestant who is on the hunt for fame and glory by winning a series of completely unrelated challenges on a Reality TV Show. The game utilises the PlayStation Eye to take a picture of the player which is then used to create an avatar which players use in the game. The game contains a series of party-style games which are part of a fake Reality TV Show.

Games include "Frock Star", a fashion show where players have to walk down a runway with as much style to win through trying out outlandish outfits and applying makeup to their avatars. Another game, "Let's Get Physical" is a combination of American Gladiators and Japanese Game Shows, where players complete a series of mini-games such as running along a giant spinning wheel while dodging dangerous obstacles on the wheel or firing the avatar through the air to fit into a chalk outline printed on a wall. Other games include "Big Beat Kitchen" where players have to cook and rap in a Hip hop cooking show, "DIY Raw", a home make-over show which involves players attempting to prevent the house from collapsing and "STAA" (Superstars Television Acting Agency) where players have to film their own television commercials.

Game progress is measured by the popularity of the player's avatar which is increased mainly through media coverage where players are reported in tabloids after winning or losing a game, being involved in lucrative product endorsements which places the avatar's name and likeliness on game billboards and TV commercials.

== Development ==
The game was unveiled at the 2010 Game Developers Conference in San Francisco. It was originally seen in a trademark filing by SCEA on September 16, 2009. It is the last game to be developed by Cambridge Studio before it was integrated as a sister company of Guerrilla Games.

== Reception ==
Reception

Aggregate score
Aggregator	Score
Metacritic	56/100

Review scores
Publication	Score
Eurogamer	3/10
Famitsu	31/40
GamesMaster	58%
GameSpot	6.5/10
GamesTM	4/10
IGN	6/10
PlayStation Official Magazine – UK	7/10
Play	53%
PSM3	66%
Push Square	3/10
VideoGamer.com	6/10

The game received "mixed" reviews according to the review aggregation website Metacritic. In Japan, where the game was ported for release under the name TV Superstar (TVスーパースター, TV Sūpāsutā) on December 9, 2010, Famitsu gave it a score of 31 out of 40.

== See also ==
- Start the Party
- Wii Party
