= The Jet Set =

Polish musical R&B duo

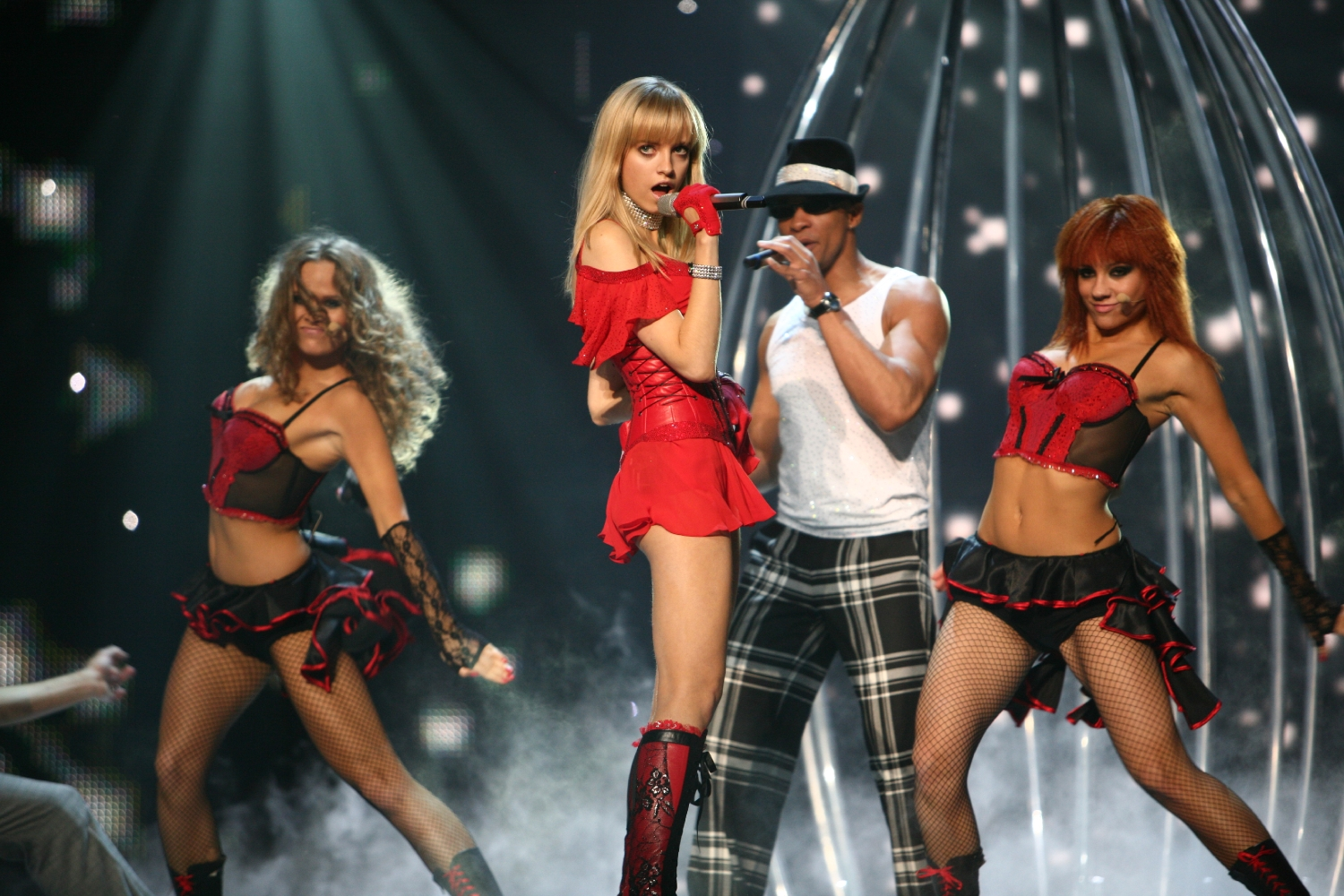
- The Jet Set at the Eurovision Song Contest 2007

Background information
- Origin: Poland
- Genres: R&B, pop, dance
- Years active: 2005—2009
- Label: Universal
- Past members: Tray (2005–2006); Sasha (2005–2009); David J (2006–2009)
- Website: jetset.pl

The Jet Set was a Polish R&B duo which consists of David Junior Serame and Sasha Strunin. They represented Poland in the semi-final of the Eurovision Song Contest 2007 in Helsinki.

== Eurovision Song Contest 2007 ==
The Jet Set represented Poland in the Eurovision Song Contest 2007 after winning the national selection on February 3. They performed the song "Time to Party" in the semi-final of the competition on May 10 in Helsinki, Finland, finishing 14th of 28 entrants and failing to qualify for the final.

Promo tour "Time to Party":

- 17.02.2007 Spain (Misión Eurovisión 2007)
- 23.02.2007 Cyprus (Cyprus 12 point)
- 24.02.2007 Latvia
- 03.03.2007 Lithuania
- 09.03.2007 Ukraine
- 30.03.2007 Ireland (The Late Late Show)

== Discography ==
=== Albums ===
Year	Title	Info
2006	Just Call Me	Poland, Rank: #35; Poland, Sales: 15 000; Poland, Certification: Gold

=== Singles ===
- "How Many People" (2006)
- "Just Call Me" (2006) - POL #9
- "Time to Party" (2007) - TUR #85
- "The Time of Our Life" (2008)

Awards and achievements
Preceded by Ich Troje with "Follow My Heart"	Poland in the Eurovision Song Contest; 2007	Succeeded by Isis Gee with "For Life"
