= Magda Femme =

Polish pop singer and songwriter (born 1971)

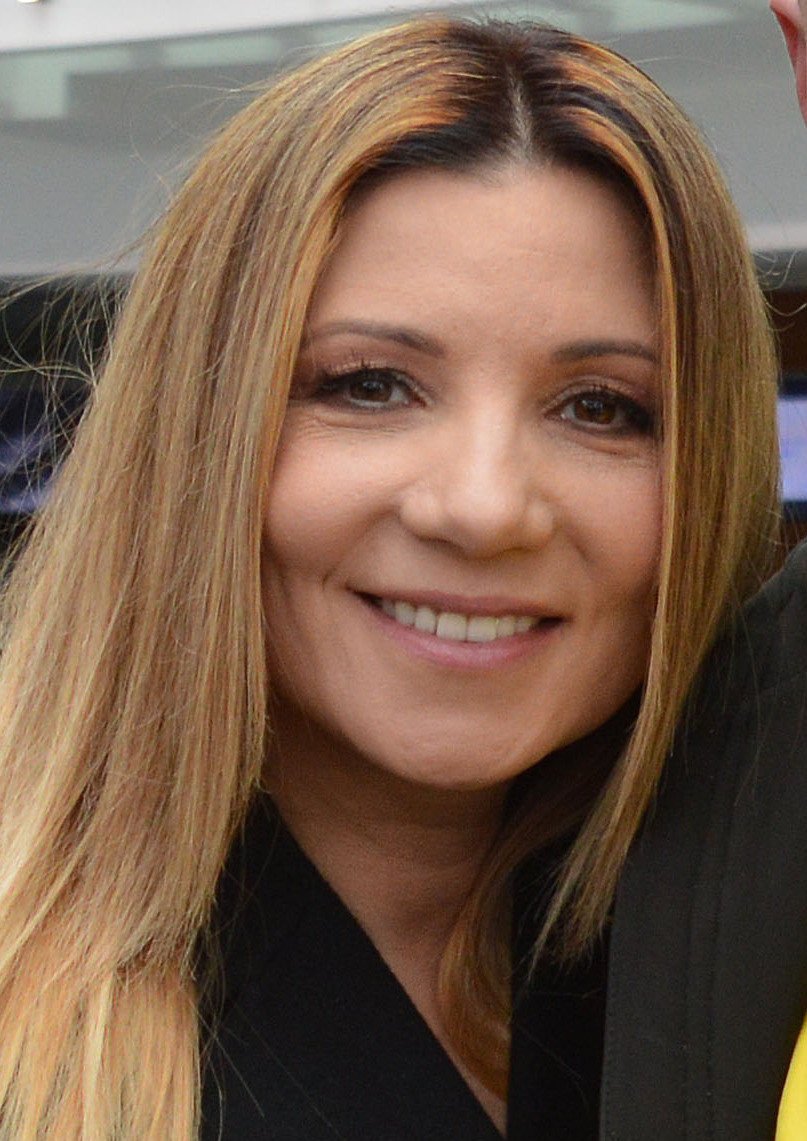
- Femme in 2018
- Born: Magdalena Pokora; 22 May 1971 (age 55); Zduńska Wola, Poland
- Occupation: Singer
- Spouse: Michał Wiśniewski (1996-2001 divorced)
- Children: 1 (daughter)
- Musical career
- Also known as: Magda Femme
- Genre: Pop
- Labels: Pomaton EMI, Universal Music Poland, Fonografika, Agencja Artystyczna MTJ
- Website: www.magda-femme.eu

Magda Femme (born Magdalena Pokora on 22 May 1971) is a Polish pop singer and songwriter.

Magda Femme was born in Łask in 1971. She was a singer in the pop group, Ich Troje, between 1996 and 2000. Magda was married to the leader of the band Michał Wiśniewski. They divorced in 2001 and she started a solo career.

== Discography ==
Title	Album details	Peak chart positions
Title	Album details	POL
Empiryzm	Released: September 18, 2000; Label: Universal Music Poland; Formats: CD	—
5000 myśli	Released: November 26, 2001; Label: Pomaton EMI; Formats: CD	5
Extremalnie	Released: April 19, 2004; Label: Universal Music Poland; Formats: CD, digital download	29
Magiczne nutki	Released: June 1, 2009; Label: Fonografika; Formats: CD	—
Retro Love	Released: July 14, 2014; Label: Agencja Artystyczna MTJ; Formats: CD, digital download	—
"—" denotes a recording that did not chart or was not released in that territory.
