= Poland in the Eurovision Song Contest 2007 =

- Eurovision Song Contest 2007
- Participating broadcaster: Telewizja Polska (TVP)
- Country: Poland
- Selection process: Piosenka dla Europy 2007
- Selection date: 3 February 2007

Competing entry
- Song: "Time to Party"
- Artist: The Jet Set
- Songwriters: Kamil Varen; David Junior Serame; Mateusz Krezan

Placement
- Semi-final result: Failed to qualify (14th)

Participation chronology

Poland was represented at the Eurovision Song Contest 2007 with the song "Time to Party" written by Kamil Varen, David Junior Serame, and Mateusz Krezan, and performed by the duo The Jet Set. The Polish participating broadcaster, Telewizja Polska (TVP), organised the national final Piosenka dla Europy 2007 in order to select its entry for the contest. The national final took place on 3 February 2007 and featured ten entries. "Time to Party" performed by The Jet Set was selected as the winner after gaining the most public votes.

Poland competed in the semi-final of the Eurovision Song Contest which took place on 10 May 2007. Performing in position 14, "Time to Party" was not announced among the top 10 entries of the semi-final and therefore did not qualify to compete in the final. It was later revealed that Poland placed fourteenth out of the 28 participating countries in the semi-final with 75 points.

== Background ==
Prior to the 2007 contest, Telewizja Polska (TVP) had participated in the Eurovision Song Contest representing Poland eleven times since its first entry in 1994. Its highest placement in the contest, to this point, has been second place, achieved with its debut entry in 1994 with the song "To nie ja!" performed by Edyta Górniak. It has only, thus far, reached the top ten on one other occasion, when "Keine Grenzen – Żadnych granic" performed by Ich Troje finished seventh in 2003. In 2005, Poland failed to qualify from the semi-final round, once again failing to qualify to the final in 2006 with their entry "Follow My Heart" performed by Ich Troje.

As part of its duties as participating broadcaster, TVP organises the selection of its entry in the Eurovision Song Contest and broadcasts the event in the country. The broadcaster confirmed its participation in the 2007 contest on 13 September 2006. In 2006, TVP organised a televised national final that featured a competition among several artists and songs in order to select its entry for the Eurovision Song Contest, a selection procedure that continued for its 2007 entry.

== Before Eurovision ==
=== Piosenka dla Europy 2007 ===
Piosenka dla Europy 2007 was the national final organised by TVP in order to select its entry for the Eurovision Song Contest 2007. The show took place on 3 February 2007 at the Studio 5 of TVP in Warsaw, hosted by Artur Orzech and Paulina Chylewska. Public televoting exclusively selected the winner. The show was broadcast on TVP1 and TVP Polonia as well as streamed online at the broadcaster's website tvp.pl. The national final was watched by 3 million viewers in Poland with a market share of 23%.

==== Competing entries ====
TVP opened a submission period for interested artists and songwriters to submit their entries between 13 September 2007 and 15 November 2007. The broadcaster received 90 submissions at the closing of the deadline. A three-member selection committee selected ten entries from the received submissions to compete in the national final. The selection committee consisted of Gina Komasa (Head of Entertainment of TVP), Piotr Klatt (musician, songwriter, journalist and music producer at TVP and artistic director of the Opole Festival) and Zygmunt Kulka (conductor, composer). The selected entries were announced on 23 November 2006.

==== Final ====
The televised final took place on 3 February 2007. Ten entries competed and the winner, "Time to Party" performed by the Jet Set, was determined entirely by a public vote. Only the winner was announced, but the top 3 are known. A four-member expert panel also provided feedback regarding the songs during the show. The experts consisted of Jacek Cygan (songwriter), Grzegorz Skawiński (composer), Agustin Egurrola (dancer and choreographer) and Maciej Zień (fashion designer). In addition to the performances of the competing entries, the band Wilki performed as the interval act.

Final – 3 February 2007
R/O	Artist	Song	Songwriter(s)	Place
1	Anna Szarmach	"Open Your Mind"	Marek Boretti, Grzegorz Jabłoński	—
2	Charizma	"Emily"	Charizma	—
3	Button Hackers	"On My Mind"	Sylwia Skoczylas, Paweł Steczek	—
4	Vino	"Come in My Heart"	Maciek Winogrodzki, Maciej Gładysz, Michał Burzymowski, Krzysztof Poliński	—
5	Mollęda	"No Second Chance"	Michał Wojnarowski, Jakub Molęda, Maciej Molęda	—
6	The Jet Set	"Time to Party"	Kamil Varen, David Junior Serame, Mateusz Krezan	1
7	Natasza Urbańska	"I Like It Loud"	Natasza Urbańska	3
8	Hania Stach	"Regroup"	Sola Akingbola, Janice Robinson	2
9	Mikael Erlandsson	"Love in the Air"	Claes Andreasson, Torbjörn Wassenius, Mikael Erlandsson	—
10	Bikini	"Don't Judge Me"	Ewa Broczek, Magdalena Dzwojda	—

== At Eurovision ==
According to Eurovision rules, all nations with the exceptions of the host country, the "Big Four" (France, Germany, Spain and the United Kingdom) and the ten highest placed finishers in the 2006 contest are required to qualify from the semi-final on 10 May 2007 in order to compete for the final on 12 May 2007; the top ten countries from the semi-final progress to the final. On 12 March 2007, an allocation draw was held which determined the running order for the semi-final and Poland was set to perform in position 14, following the entry from Croatia and before the entry from Serbia.

The semi-final and the final were broadcast in Poland on TVP1 and TVP Polonia with commentary by Artur Orzech. TVP appointed Maciej Orłoś as its spokesperson to announce the Polish votes during the final.

=== Semi-final ===
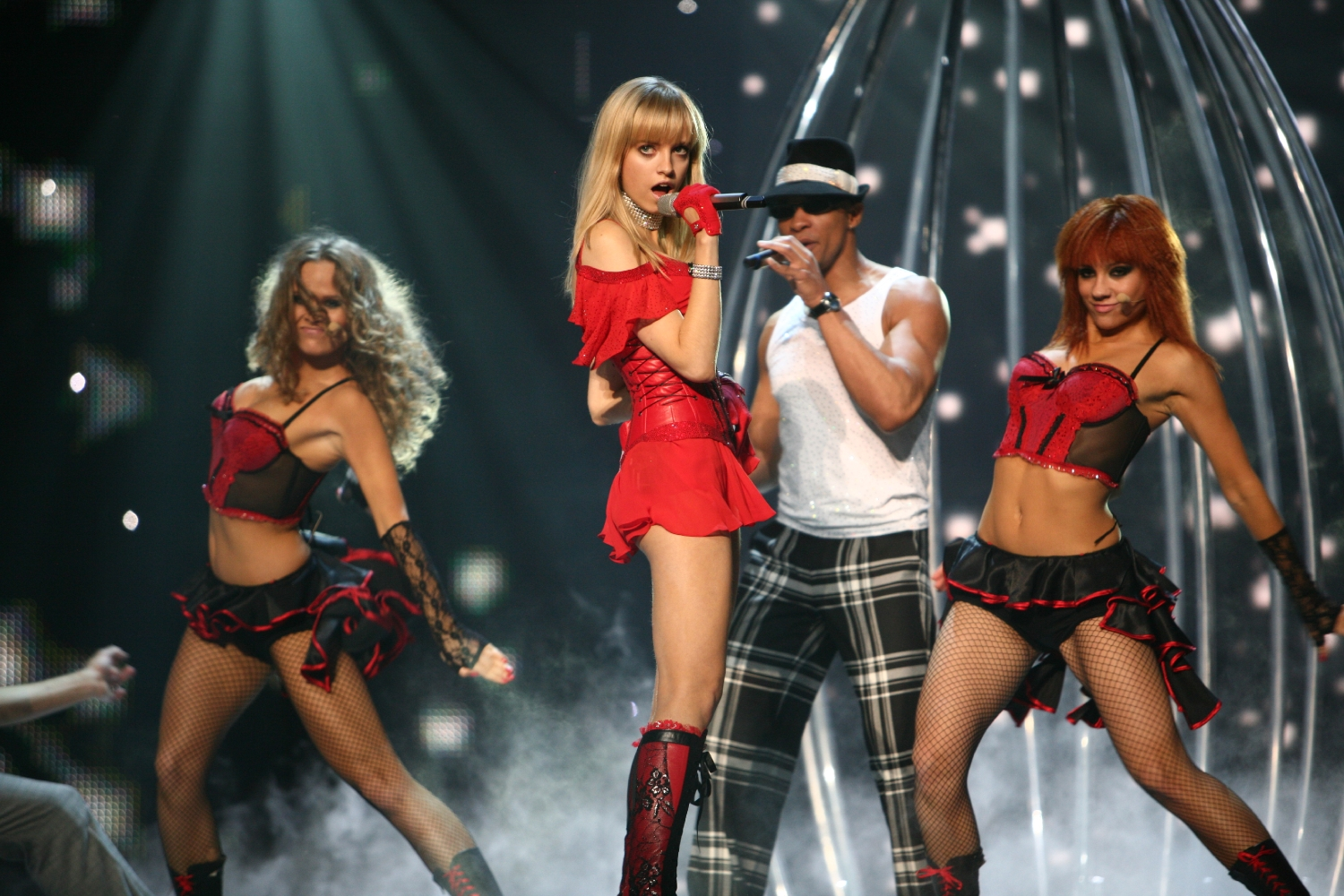
The Jet Set performing in the first semi-final

The Jet Set took part in technical rehearsals on 5 and 7 May, followed by dress rehearsals on 9 and 10 May. The Polish performance featured the members of the Jet Set joined by four dancers on stage. Sasha Strunin performed in a red dress with black and red-laced boots, while David Junior Serame performed in a vest and striped trousers. The performance began with Strunin and the female dancers in a silver cage with built-in pyrotechnic firework effects, covered with a red cloth which was later removed to reveal the female performers. After escaping the cage to join the male performers, Strunin concluded the performance by ending up back in the cage. The stage was predominantly red with the LED screens displaying star-studded bling, red chains and golden wireframe cityscapes. The performance also featured smoke effects. The choreographers for the Polish performance were Agustin Egurrola and Maja Korzeniowska.

At the end of the show, Poland was not announced among the top 10 entries in the semi-final and therefore failed to qualify to compete in the final. It was later revealed that Poland placed fourteenth in the semi-final, receiving a total of 75 points.

=== Voting ===
Below is a breakdown of points awarded to Poland and awarded by Poland in the semi-final and grand final of the contest. The nation awarded its 12 points to Latvia in the semi-final and to Ukraine in the final of the contest.

==== Points awarded to Poland ====
Points awarded to Poland (Semi-final)
Score	Country
12 points	
10 points	Andorra; Ireland
8 points	
7 points	
6 points	Georgia
5 points	Armenia; Belarus; Germany; Ukraine
4 points	Austria
3 points	Cyprus; France; Hungary; Lithuania; United Kingdom
2 points	Denmark; Iceland; Macedonia; Serbia
1 point	Latvia; Montenegro

==== Points awarded by Poland ====
Points awarded by Poland (Semi-final)
Score	Country
12 points	Latvia
10 points	Portugal
8 points	Hungary
7 points	Slovenia
6 points	Andorra
5 points	Serbia
4 points	Belarus
3 points	Georgia
2 points	Norway
1 point	Turkey

Points awarded by Poland (Final)
Score	Country
12 points	Ukraine
10 points	Armenia
8 points	Serbia
7 points	Belarus
6 points	Moldova
5 points	Georgia
4 points	Slovenia
3 points	Russia
2 points	Hungary
1 point	Latvia
