= Danuta Dudzińska-Wieczorek =

Polish opera singer (born 1966)

- Born: Danuta Barbara Dudzińska; 14 October 1966; Zduńska Wola, Poland
- Education: Academy of Music in Łódź
- Occupation: Opera singer
- Years active: 1992–present
- Children: Justyna Jakubowska
- Parent(s): Antoni Dudziński; Barbara Dudzińska (née Wróblewska)

Danuta Barbara Dudzińska-Wieczorek (born 14 October 1966 in Zduńska Wola) is a Polish opera singer.

== Early life and career ==
She grew up in Zduńska Wola, where she had been educated in the musical direction since childhood. In 1992 she graduated with distinction from the Academy of Music in Łódź at the Vocal-Acting Faculty. At the same time, she received the first prize and a special prize for the performance in Duszniki Zdrój. A year later, she won the distinction at the 5th Vocal Competition of Ada Sari in Nowy Sącz.

Together with the pianist Bogna Dulińska she recorded the album "Arie i pieśni", which was released in 2005 by the Polish Music Institute on the occasion of the 60th anniversary of its founding.

Since 2006, she is a teacher of singing in Łódź, and since 2007 lecturer at the Academy of Music in Łódź. In January 2013, she defended her PhD in Music Art.

In 2016 she was awarded by the President of Poland, Andrzej Duda, the Medal for Long-term Service.
