= Justyna Majkowska =

Polish singer (born 1977)

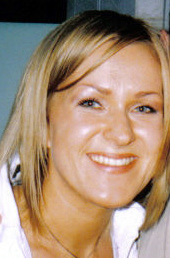
- Born: 17 July 1977 (age 49); Zduńska Wola, Poland
- Education: Opole University
- Occupation: Singer
- Spouse: Jarosław Miśkiewicz
- Children: 1 (son)
- Musical career
- Genres: Pop
- Instrument: Vocals
- Labels: Fonografika; Anaconda Productions

Justyna Majkowska (born 17 July 1977) is a Polish singer. She began her musical career as a member of the band Erato. In 2000, she joined the band Ich Troje as their lead female vocalist. With Ich Troje, she represented Poland in the Eurovision Song Contest 2003, and finished in seventh place with the song "Keine Grenzen – Żadnych granic". After recording two diamond-certified albums with the band, she left in 2003, briefly rejoining them in 2006 to represent Poland in the Eurovision Song Contest again with the song "Follow My Heart".

As a solo artist, Majkowska released two studio albums: Nie czekam na cud (2004) and Zakochana od jutra (2011). The latter was nominated for the European Independent Album of the Year Award.

== Discography ==
- Nie czekam na cud (2004, Fonografika)
- Zakochana od jutra (2011, Anaconda Productions)
